= 2023 Palarong Pambansa =

Multi-sport competition

63rd Palarong Pambansa
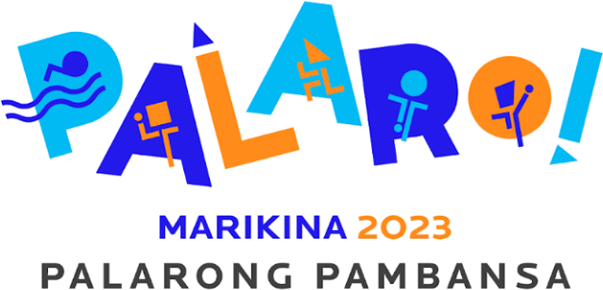
- Logo of the 63rd Palarong Pambansa 2023
- Host city: Marikina, Metro Manila
- Country: Philippines
- Motto: "Batang Malakas, Bansang Matatag." (lit. 'A Strong Youth, A Stable Nation')
- Teams: 17 regional athletic associations
- Athletes: 9,172
- Sport: 34
- Events: 1,573
- Opening: July 29, 2023
- Closing: August 5, 2023
- Opened by: President Bongbong Marcos
- Closed by: Vice President Sara Duterte
- Athlete's Oath: Alyssa Valdez
- Torch lighter: Bea de Leon and Mark Barroca
- Main venue: Marikina Sports Center
- Broadcast partners: Net 25
- Website: Palaro 2023

The 2023 Palarong Pambansa, officially known as the 63rd Palarong Pambansa, also known as Palaro 2023 and Marikina 2023, was a multi-sport event held in Marikina, Metro Manila, from July 29 to August 5, 2023. Student-athletes from 17 athletic associations representing the 17 regions of the Philippines competed in different sporting events and disciplines.

Prior to that, the Games were originally scheduled in the city for 2020 but were canceled due to the COVID-19 pandemic.

== Hosting ==
=== Preparations ===
Nearly three years since the onset of the COVID-19 pandemic forced its cancellation, the local government of Marikina, DepEd-NCR, and the Schools Division Office of Marikina hosted the 63rd edition of Palarong Pambansa.

An additional tier called the Pre-National Qualifying Meet was introduced to lessen the number of delegations, shorten the duration of the event, and lower the expenses. Under the new tier, delegations were clustered into four groups based on their geographical location. The top two regional delegations per cluster then advanced to the actual Palarong Pambansa event.

As such, the said new level only featured team sports. Measurable sports adopted the qualifying distance, time, and points set by the Palarong Pambansa. Other sports that do not apply qualifying standards in the selection of athletes and are not identified as team sports advanced directly to the Palarong Pambansa culminating competitions.

The modified competition format aimeed to prevent the disruption of classes and to observe minimum public health and safety protocols and other relevant policies and guidelines issued. Aside from student-athletes from the 17 regional athletic associations, Filipino athletes enrolled in recognized schools overseas were also allowed to compete in individual sports under the banner of Philippine Schools Overseas.

On February 6 and April 24, Palarong Pambansa conducted a 5-day division and regional meets according to DepEd Memorandum No. 5, s. 2023, as recommended by the Palarong Pambansa Secretariat.

On July 22, Vice President and Department of Education (DepEd) secretary Sara Duterte led the inspection of playing venues at the Marikina Sports Center prior to the press launch. She was joined in the technical inspection by Marikina Mayor Marcelino Teodoro, Interior and Local Government secretary Benhur Abalos, Philippine Sports Commission (PSC) chairman Richard Bachmann and Marikina Sports Center administrator Angelito Llabres. Duterte and Teodoro also signed the memorandum of agreement between DepEd and the Marikina government for the hosting of Palaro 2023.

=== Host city ===
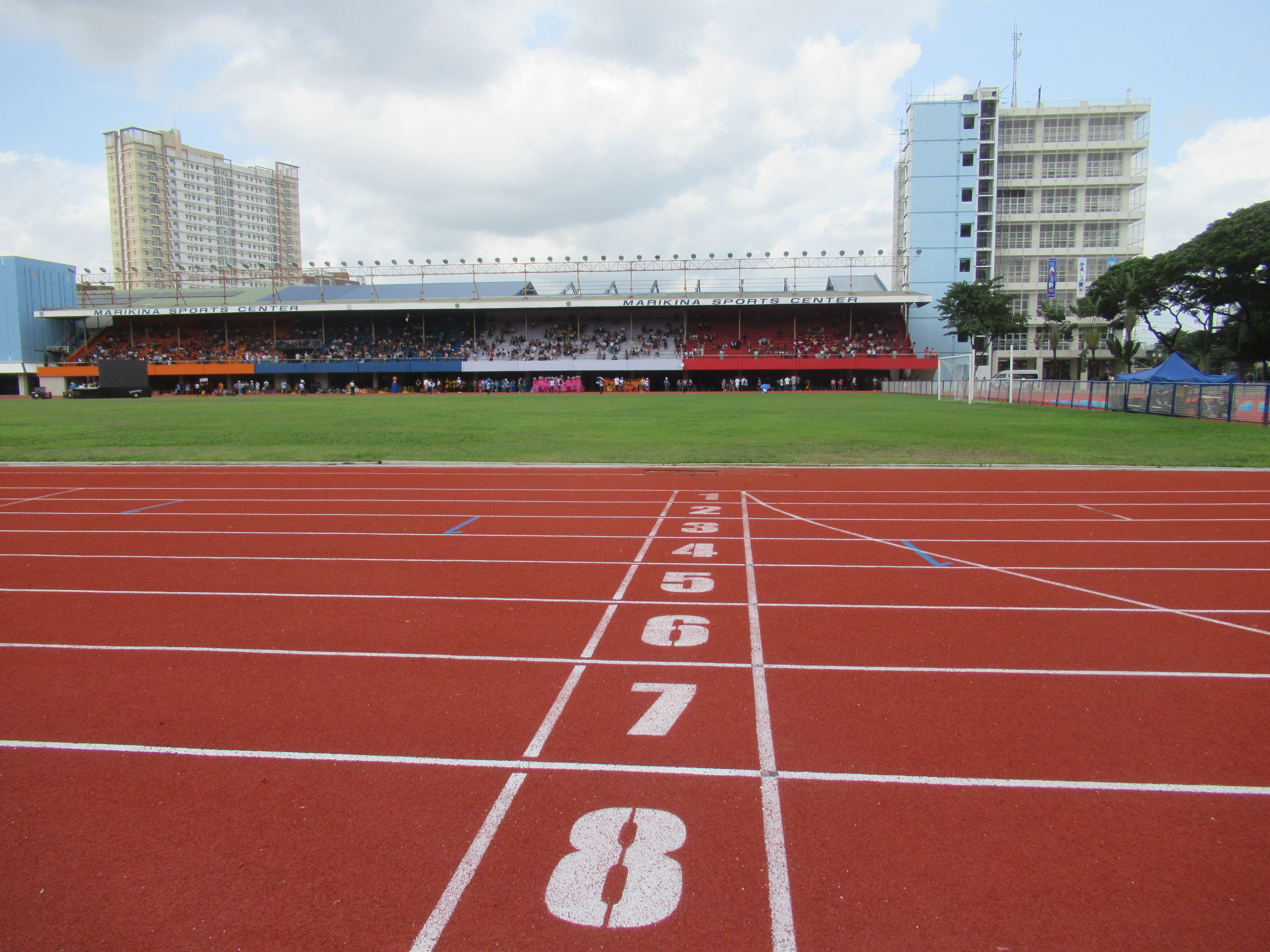
Marikina Sports Center, the main venue of the Games

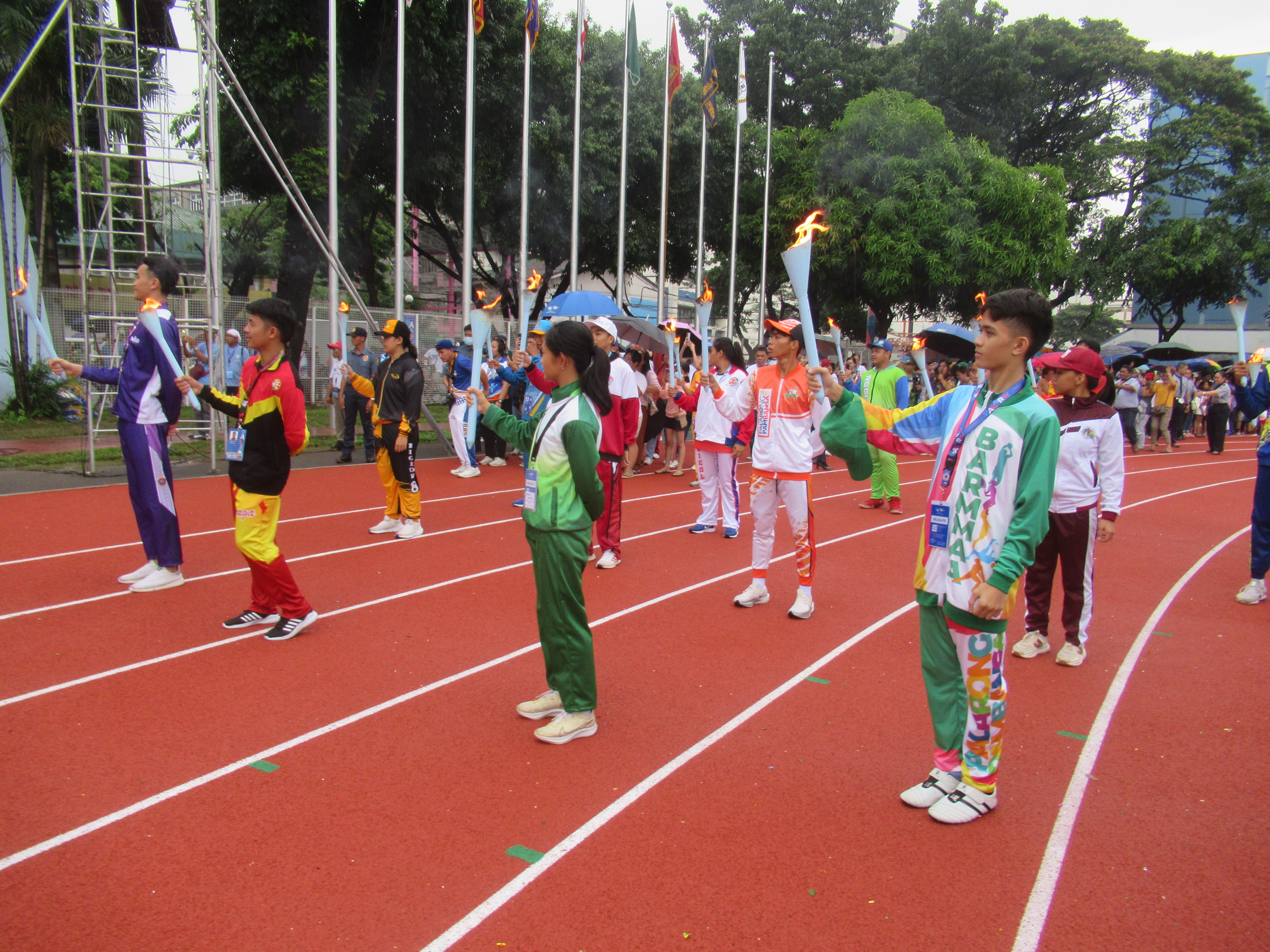
Torch bearers

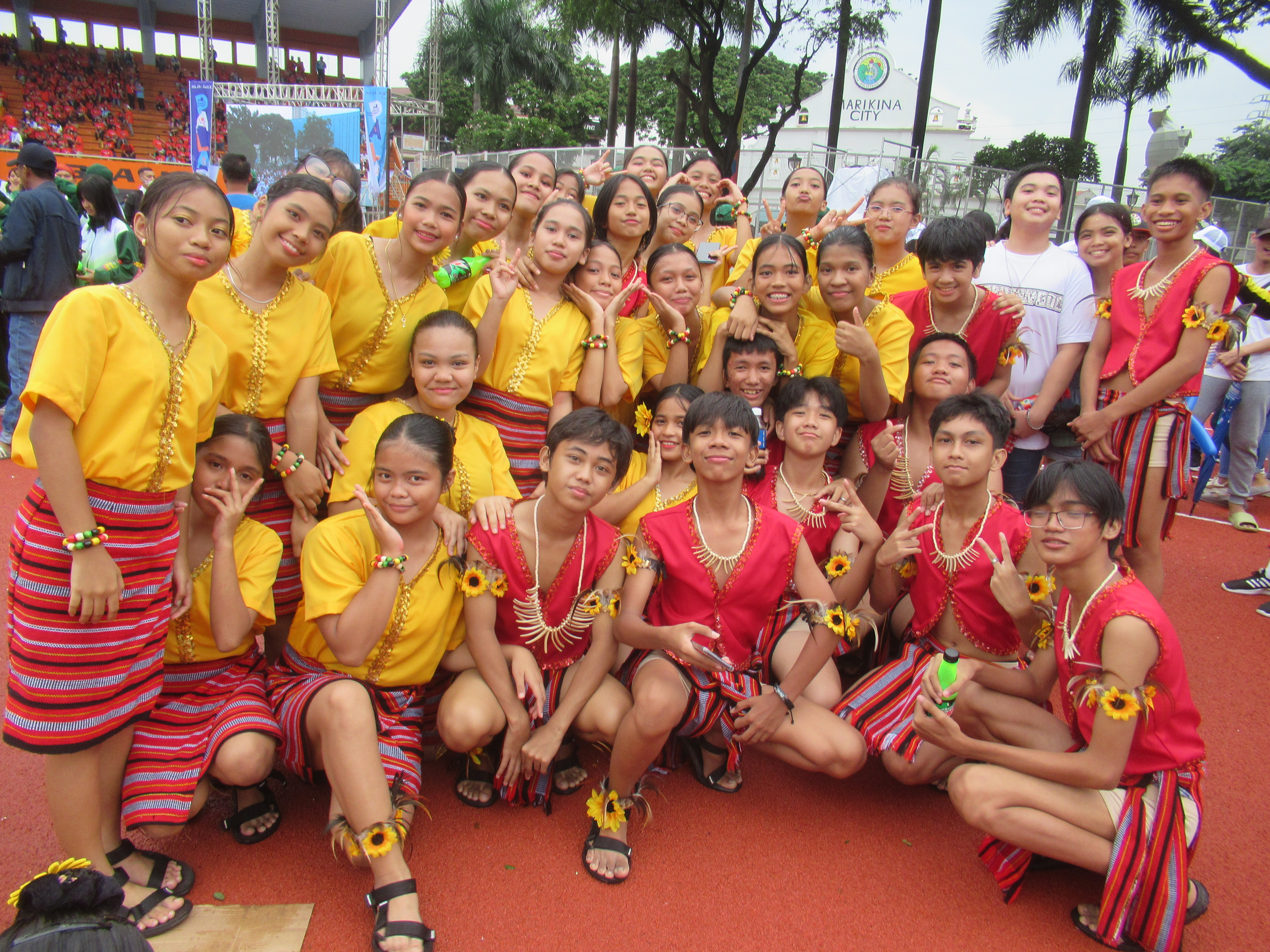
Student athletes

This was Marikina's first time hosting the Palarong Pambansa and the first time since the halt of the event due to the COVID 19 pandemic. It was also NCR's fifth hosting since the 1966 Palarong Pambansa held in Quezon City, after 54 years. Marikina was the fourth city in NCR to stage the Palarong Pambansa after Manila, Pasig, and Quezon City (1948 and 1960, 1964, and 1966 respectively). Marikina also bid for recent editions of Palarong Pambansa: 2014 (runner-up to Sta. Cruz, Laguna) and 2012 (runner-up to Lingayen, Pangasinan).

Marikina is part of the NCR contingent and Marikina Sports Center served as the main playing venue as well as the venue of the grand opening ceremony on July 31, two days after the Games' pre-event activities (such as meetings, refreshers, and training) started, and the closing ceremony.

In history, Marikina was supposed to host the "31st" Palarong Pambansa in 1980 but was canceled. Marikina hosted the 1980 Palarong Bagong Lipunan as a substitute for the 1980 Palarong Pambansa.

Marikina also previously hosted some major multi-sporting events: NCR Palaro, 2014 ASEAN School Games, 2011 UAAP Season 74, 2005 Southeast Asian Games, 1980 Palarong Bagong Lipunan, the first edition of 1973 Asian Athletics Championships and 1972 ISF Men's World Championship.

== The Games ==
=== Participating regions ===
Host Region

Regions
Code	Official name	Region colors
BARMAA	Bangsamoro Autonomous Region in Muslim Mindanao	
CARAA	Cordillera Administrative Region	
NCRAA	National Capital Region	
I-R1AA	Region I / Ilocos Region	
II-CAVRAA	Region II / Cagayan Valley	
III-CLRAA	Region III / Central Luzon	
IV-A STCAA	Region IV-A / Southern Tagalog - Calabarzon	
IV-B MRAA	Region IV-B / Southern Tagalog - Mimaropa	
V-BRAA	Region V / Bicol Region	
VI-WVRAA	Region VI / Western Visayas	
VII-CVIRAA	Region VII / Central Visayas	
VIII-EVRAA	Region VIII / Eastern Visayas	
IX-ZPRAA	Region IX / Zamboanga Peninsula	
X-NMRAA	Region X / Northern Mindanao	
XI-DAVRAA	Region XI / Davao Region	
XII-SRAA	Region XII / Soccsksargen	
CARAGA	Region XIII / Caraga	

=== Tiers ===
A Pre-National Qualifying Meet was introduced to lessen the number of delegations, shorten the duration of the event, and lower the expenses. As such, the said new level only featured team sports such as baseball, basketball, football, futsal, sepak takraw, football, and volleyball. Under the new tier, delegations were clustered into four groups based on their geographical location.

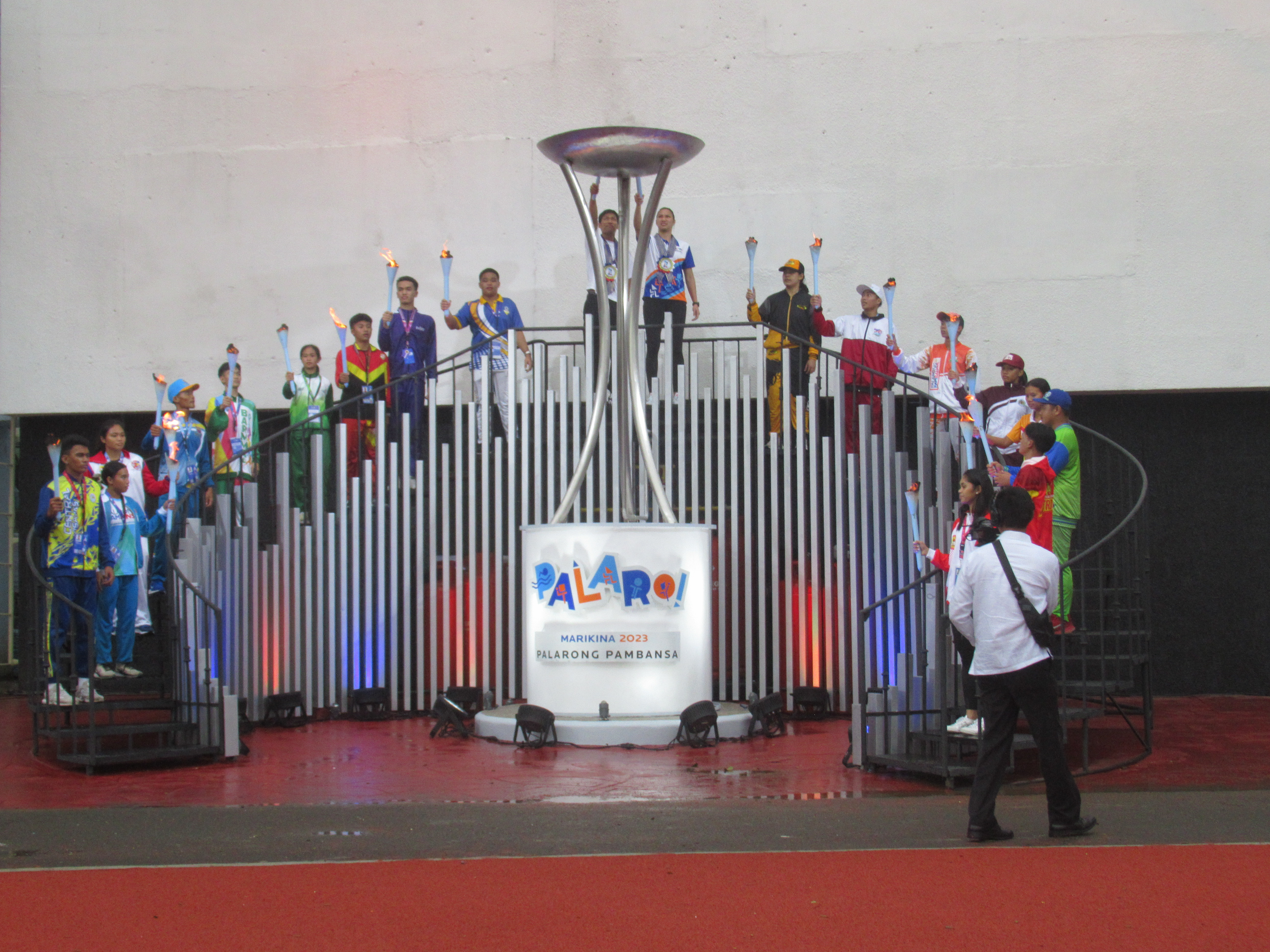
Cauldron lighters Bea de Leon (volleyball) and Mark Barroca (basketball)

Cluster 1

- Ilocos Region
- Cagayan Valley
- Central Luzon
- Cordillera Administrative Region

Cluster 2

- Calabarzon
- Mimaropa
- National Capital Region
- Bicol Region

Cluster 3

- Western Visayas
- Central Visayas
- Eastern Visayas
- Zamboanga Peninsula

Cluster 4

- Northern Mindanao
- Davao Region
- SOCCSKSARGEN
- CARAGA
- BARMM

=== Billeting areas ===
Schools used as billeting quarters for the 2023 Palarong Pambansa.

Host Region

Billeting quarters for student-athletes
Region	Billeting Area	Location
Bangsamoro Autonomous Region in Muslim Mindanao	Industrial Valley ES; Industrial Valley NHS	Industrial Valley Complex
Cordillera Administrative Region	Barangka ES; Barangka NHS	Barangka
Cordillera Administrative Region	Tañong HS	Tañong
National Capital Region	Sto. Niño ES; Sto. Niño NHS	Santo Niño
Region I - Ilocos Region	San Roque ES; San Roque NHS	San Roque
Region II - Cagayan Valley	SSS Village ES; SSS Village NHS	Concepcion Dos
Region III - Central Luzon	Parang ES	Parang
Region IV-A - Southern Tagalog - Calabarzon	Parang NHS	Parang
Region IV-B - Southern Tagalog - Mimaropa	Concepcion ES	Concepcion Uno
Region V - Bicol Region	Marikina HS	Concepcion Uno
Region VI - Western Visayas	Calumpang ES; Calumpang NHS	Calumpang
Region VII - Central Visayas	Malanday ES	Malanday
Region VIII - Eastern Visayas	Marikina ES	Santa Elena
Region IX - Zamboanga Peninsula	H. Bautista ES	Concepcion Uno
Region X - Northern Mindanao	Nangka ES	Nangka
Region XI - Davao Region	Concepcion Integrated School	Concepcion Uno
Region XII - Soccsksargen	Fortune ES; Fortune HS	Fortune
Region XIII - Caraga	Jesus Dela Peña NHS; L. Victorino ES	Jesus Dela Peña

Billeting quarters for officials and committees
Officials	Billeting Area	Location
National Screening and Accreditation Committee (NSAC) / National Technical Working Group (NTWG)	Regional Educational Learning Center (RELC) / National Educators Academy of the Philippines (NEAP)	Concepcion Uno
Philippine School Overseas (PSOs) Technical & Officials	Jehoshua Academy	Marikina Heights
Philippine Youth Convergence	Infant Jesus Academy	Concepcion Dos
Philippine Youth Convergence	Marist School	Marikina Heights
Philippine Youth Convergence	Our Lady of Perpetual Succor College	Marikina Heights
Philippine Youth Convergence	St. Scholastica's Academy	Marikina Heights
Technical Officiating Officials	Kapitan Moy ES	Santa Elena
Technical Officiating Officials	Marikina Heights HS	Marikina Heights
Technical Officiating Officials	Santa Elena HS	Santa Elena

Notes: ES – Elementary School, HS – High School, NHS – National High School

=== Sports ===
A total of 34 sports disciplines, including the para-games, demonstrations, and exhibition sports, were featured.

Included as an exhibition sport were Indigenous Filipino (Traditional) Games, also known as "Laro ng Lahi", such as Kadang-kadang, Tumbang Preso, and Patintero.

Demonstration Sports

- Dancesport
- Pencak Silat

Exhibition Sports

- Cheerdancing
- Esports
- Obstacle course
- Traditional games
- Weightlifting

Parasports

- Athletics
- Bocce
- Goalball
- Swimming

Regular Sports

- Archery
- Arnis
- Athletics
- Badminton
- Baseball
- Basketball
- Billiards
- Boxing
- Chess
- Football
- Futsal
- Gymnastics
  - Aerobics
  - Artistic
  - Rhythmic
- Sepak takraw
- Softball
- Swimming
- Table tennis
- Taekwondo
- Tennis
- Volleyball
- Wrestling
- Wushu

=== Venues ===
Majority of the sports took place in venues within Marikina. Locations in italics denote venues outside the city of Marikina (Antipolo and Cainta, Rizal;, Quezon City, Pasig, Manila).

Regular Sports
Event	Venue	Location
Opening and closing ceremonies	Marikina Sports Center	Santa Elena
Archery	STI Goldtoe Archery Center	Barangka
Arnis	Marist HS Gymnasium	Marikina Heights
Athletics	Marikina Sports Center - Athletics Track & Field	Santa Elena
Athletics	Philsports Stadium	PhilSports Complex
Badminton	Trevi Sports Gymnasium	Concepcion Uno
Baseball	Marquinton Baseball Field	Santo Niño
Baseball	Santo Niño Baseball Field	Santo Niño
Basketball	Marikina Sports Center Gymnasium [Finals]	Santa Elena
Basketball	Marist HS Gymnasium	Marikina Heights
Basketball	Marist ES Gymnasium	Marikina Heights
Basketball	PBL/Lambak Gymnasium	Santa Elena
Billiards	Sta. Lucia Bowling & Billiards Center	Sta. Lucia East Center
Boxing	Plaza De Los Alcades (Marikina City Hall Grounds)	Santa Elena
Chess	Marikina Convention Center	Concepcion Dos
Football	Ateneo Football Field	Ateneo de Manila University
Football	Marikina Sports Center - Football Field [Finals]	Santa Elena
Football	Marist Football Field	Marikina Heights
Futsal	Hacieda Heights Gymnasium	Concepcion Dos
Gymnastics	San Andres Gymnasium (Aerobic)	San Andres Sports Complex
Gymnastics	Rizal Memorial Coliseum (Artistic)	Rizal Mem. Sports Complex
Gymnastics	Ninoy Aquino Stadium (Rhythmic)	Rizal Mem. Sports Complex
Sepak takraw	Marikina HS Gymnasium	Concepcion Uno
Softball	Patio Rosario Open Field	Sumulong Highway
Swimming	Marikina Sports Center - Indoor Pool	Santa Elena
Table tennis	Jem Civic Center	Parang
Taekwondo	St. Scholasticas Academy Gymnasium	Marikina Heights
Tennis	Fin Asia Tennis Court	Sumulong Highway
Tennis	Rancho Estate 1 & 2 Multipurpose Hall	Concepcion Dos
Tennis	Suburbia East Tennis Center	Parang
Volleyball	Marikina Sports Center - Volleyball Area	Santa Elena
Volleyball	Marikit Multipurpose Gymnasium	Santo Niño
Volleyball	OLOPSC Gymnasium	Marikina Heights
Wrestling	Simeona Gymnasium	Concepcion Uno
Wushu	Vista Valley Gymnasium	Santo Niño

Demonstration Sports
Event	Venue	Location
Dancesport	National Christian Life College Auditorium	Santo Niño
Pencak Silat	Parkland Estate Gymnasium	Malanday

Special Para Events
Event	Venue	Location
Athletics	Marikina Sports Center - Athletics Track & Field	Santa Elena
Athletics	Philsports Stadium	PhilSports Complex
Bocce	Loyola Grand Villas Gymnasium	Loyola Grand Villas
Goalball	Loyola Grand Villas Gymnasium	Loyola Grand Villas
Swimming	Marikina Sports Center - Indoor Pool	Santa Elena

Exhibition Sports
Event	Venue	Location
Cheerdancing	Marikina Sports Center Gymnasium	Santa Elena
Esports	Teatro Marikina	San Roque
Obstacle course	Marikina Sports Center Gymnasium	Santa Elena
Weightlifting	Marikina Sports Center Gymnasium	Santa Elena
Kadang-kadang (Indigenous game)	Marikina Sports Center Gymnasium	Santa Elena
Patintero (Indigenous game)	Marikina Sports Center Gymnasium	Santa Elena
Tumbang Preso (Indigenous game)	Marikina Sports Center Gymnasium	Santa Elena

Source: 2023 Palarong Pambansa Playing Venues

=== Calendar ===
OC	Opening ceremony	●	Event competitions	F/M	Finals/Medal events	CC	Closing ceremony

	July				August					Events
	28 Sat	29 Sat	30 Sun	31 Mon	1 Tue	2 Wed	3 Thu	4 Fri	5 Sat	Events
Ceremonies				OC					CC	—N/a
Regular and Demonstration^{1} Sports
Archery					●	●	●	●	M	
Arnis					●	●	●	●	M	
Athletics				M	M	M	M	M	M	
Badminton					●	●	●	●	M	
Baseball					●	●	●	●	M	
Basketball					●	●	●	●	M	
Billiards					●	●	●	●	M	
Boxing					●	●	●	●	M	
Chess					●	●	●	M		
Dancesport^{1}						●	M			
Football					●	●	●	●	M	
Futsal					●	●	●	●	M	
Gymnastics: Aerobics					●	●	●	M		
Gymnastics: Artistic					●	●	M	M		
Gymnastics: Rhythmic					●	●	●	M		
Pencak Silat^{1}					●	M				
Sepak takraw					●	●	●	M		
Softball					●	●	●	●	M	
Swimming					M	M	M	M		
Table tennis					●	M	M	●	M	
Taekwondo					●	●	●	M		
Tennis					●	●	M	●	M	
Volleyball					●	●	M	M		
Wrestling						●	●	M		
Wushu					●	●	●	M		
Parasports
Athletics				M	M	M	M			
Bocce					●	●	●	M		
Goalball					●	●	●	M		
Swimming					M	M	M			
Exhibition Sports
Cheerdancing	F									
Esports		●	F							
Obstacle course	F									
Weightlifting	F									
Indigenous Sports	●									

Source: 2023 Palarong Pambansa Schedule of Games

== Medal tally ==
=== Regular games ===
As of 5 August 2023, 11:59:59PM (UTC+8); Overall ranking

Host Region

Rank	Region	Gold	Silver	Bronze	Total
1	National Capital Region (NCRAA)*	85	74	55	214
2	Western Visayas (VI-WVRAA)	60	45	44	149
3	Calabarzon (IV-A STCAA)	52	52	57	161
4	Central Luzon (III-CLRAA)	28	33	46	107
5	Central Visayas (VII-CVIRAA)	26	18	35	79
6	Davao Region (XI-DavRAA)	21	18	27	66
7	Northern Mindanao (X-NMRAA)	19	20	33	72
8	Soccsksargen (XII-SRAA)	17	19	34	70
9	Cordillera Administrative Region (CARAA)	17	17	14	48
10	Bicol Region (V-BRAA)	13	15	22	50
11	Ilocos Region (I-R1AA)	9	11	23	43
12	Cagayan Valley (II-CAVRAA)	8	13	17	38
13	Mimaropa (IV-B MRAA)	6	8	13	27
14	Eastern Visayas (VIII-EVRAA)	5	17	15	37
15	Caraga (CARAGA)	4	11	20	35
16	Zamboanga Peninsula (IX-ZPRAA)	3	5	13	21
17	Bangsamoro Autonomous Region (BARMAA)	2	0	4	6
Totals (17 entries)		375	376	472	1,223

Source: 2023 Palarong Pambansa Medal Tally

=== Demonstration games ===
As of 5 August 2023, 11:59:59PM (UTC+8); Overall ranking

Host Region

Rank	Region	Gold	Silver	Bronze	Total
1	Western Visayas (VI-WVRAA)	13	8	2	23
2	Central Visayas (VII-CVIRAA)	6	3	3	12
3	Soccsksargen (XII-SRAA)	4	2	6	12
4	Davao Region (XI-DavRAA)	4	0	9	13
5	Eastern Visayas (VIII-EVRAA)	2	4	0	6
6	Northern Mindanao (X-NMRAA)	1	2	0	3
7	National Capital Region (NCRAA)*	0	7	0	7
8	Zamboanga Peninsula (IX-ZPRAA)	0	2	5	7
9	Bicol Region (V-BRAA)	0	1	2	3
9	Calabarzon (IV-A STCAA)	0	1	2	3
11	Caraga (CARAGA)	0	0	2	2
12	Bangsamoro Autonomous Region (BARMAA)	0	0	0	0
12	Cagayan Valley (II-CAVRAA)	0	0	0	0
12	Central Luzon (III-CLRAA)	0	0	0	0
12	Cordillera Administrative Region (CARAA)	0	0	0	0
12	Ilocos Region (I-R1AA)	0	0	0	0
12	Mimaropa (IV-B MRAA)	0	0	0	0
Totals (17 entries)		30	30	31	91

Source: 2023 Palarong Pambansa Medal Tally

=== Para games ===
As of 5 August 2023, 11:59:59PM (UTC+8)

Host Region

Rank	Region	Gold	Silver	Bronze	Total
1	Western Visayas (VI-WVRAA)	27	13	6	46
2	Davao Region (XI-DavRAA)	12	9	10	31
3	Calabarzon (IV-A STCAA)	9	4	9	22
4	Bicol Region (V-BRAA)	7	5	6	18
5	Central Luzon (III-CLRAA)	7	4	2	13
6	Zamboanga Peninsula (IX-ZPRAA)	7	1	1	9
7	Soccsksargen (XII-SRAA)	4	8	2	14
8	Central Visayas (VII-CVIRAA)	4	2	5	11
9	Ilocos Region (I-R1AA)	4	2	4	10
10	National Capital Region (NCRAA)*	2	9	8	19
11	Cordillera Administrative Region (CARAA)	2	0	0	2
12	Caraga (CARAGA)	1	4	0	5
13	Bangsamoro Autonomous Region (BARMAA)	0	2	1	3
14	Cagayan Valley (II-CAVRAA)	0	1	1	2
15	Eastern Visayas (VIII-EVRAA)	0	0	0	0
15	Mimaropa (IV-B MRAA)	0	0	0	0
15	Northern Mindanao (X-NMRAA)	0	0	0	0
Totals (17 entries)		86	64	55	205

Source: 2023 Palarong Pambansa Medal Tally

== Controversy ==
During the closing ceremony at the Marikina Sports Center, a portion of the drone show erroneously depicted the Philippine flag with its blue and red strips interchanged, a variation used in a state of war. Following the ceremony, the supplier of the drones, DroneTechPH, issued a public apology, admitting that it was unable to test the drone sequence ahead of the ceremony, citing inclement weather.

On August 6, 2023, the Marikina City Government issued a statement condemning the error and announcing their intention to pursue legal action against the company.

== Gallery ==
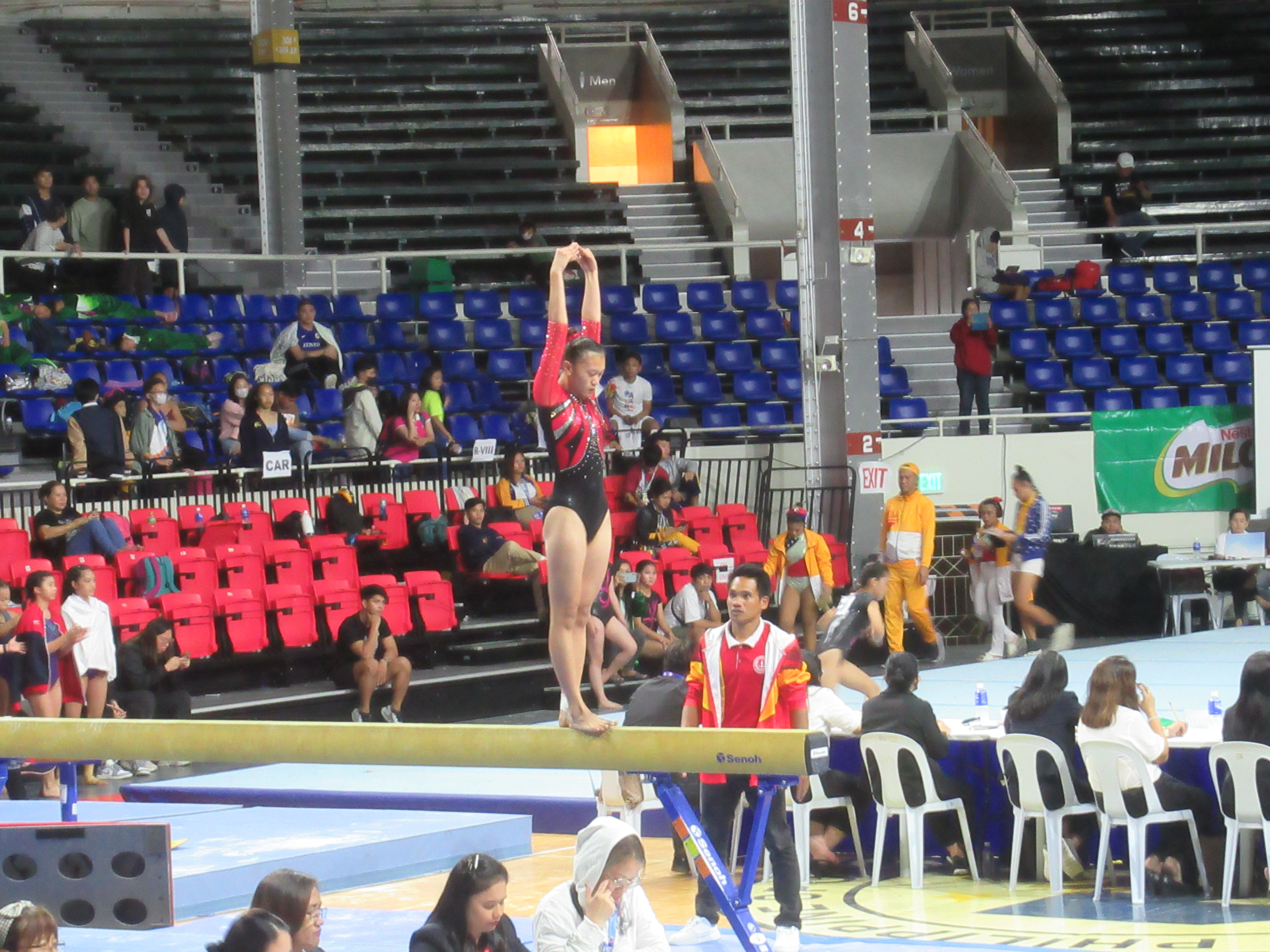
Rhythmic and artistic gymnastics at Rizal Memorial Coliseum

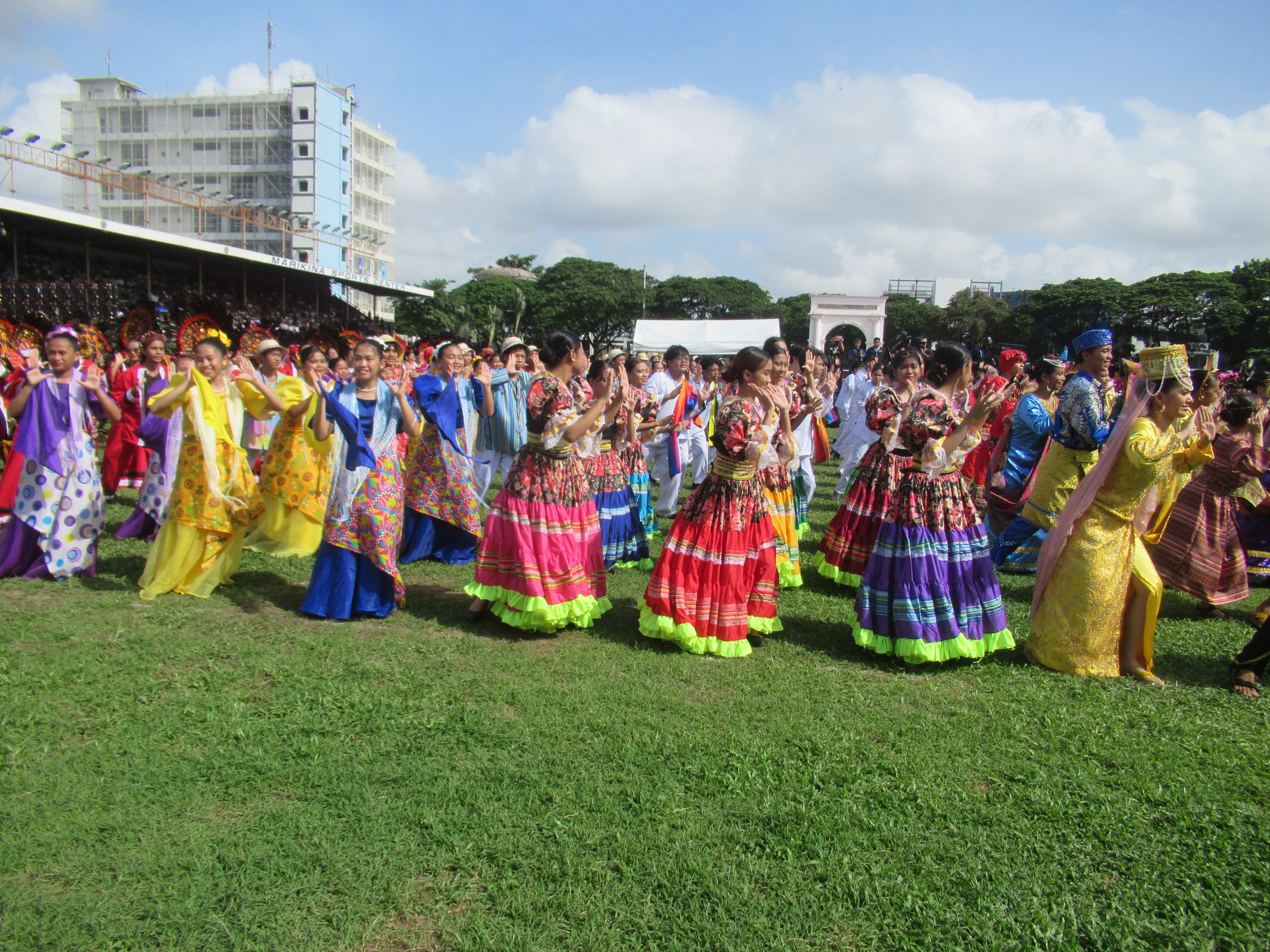
Farewell dance

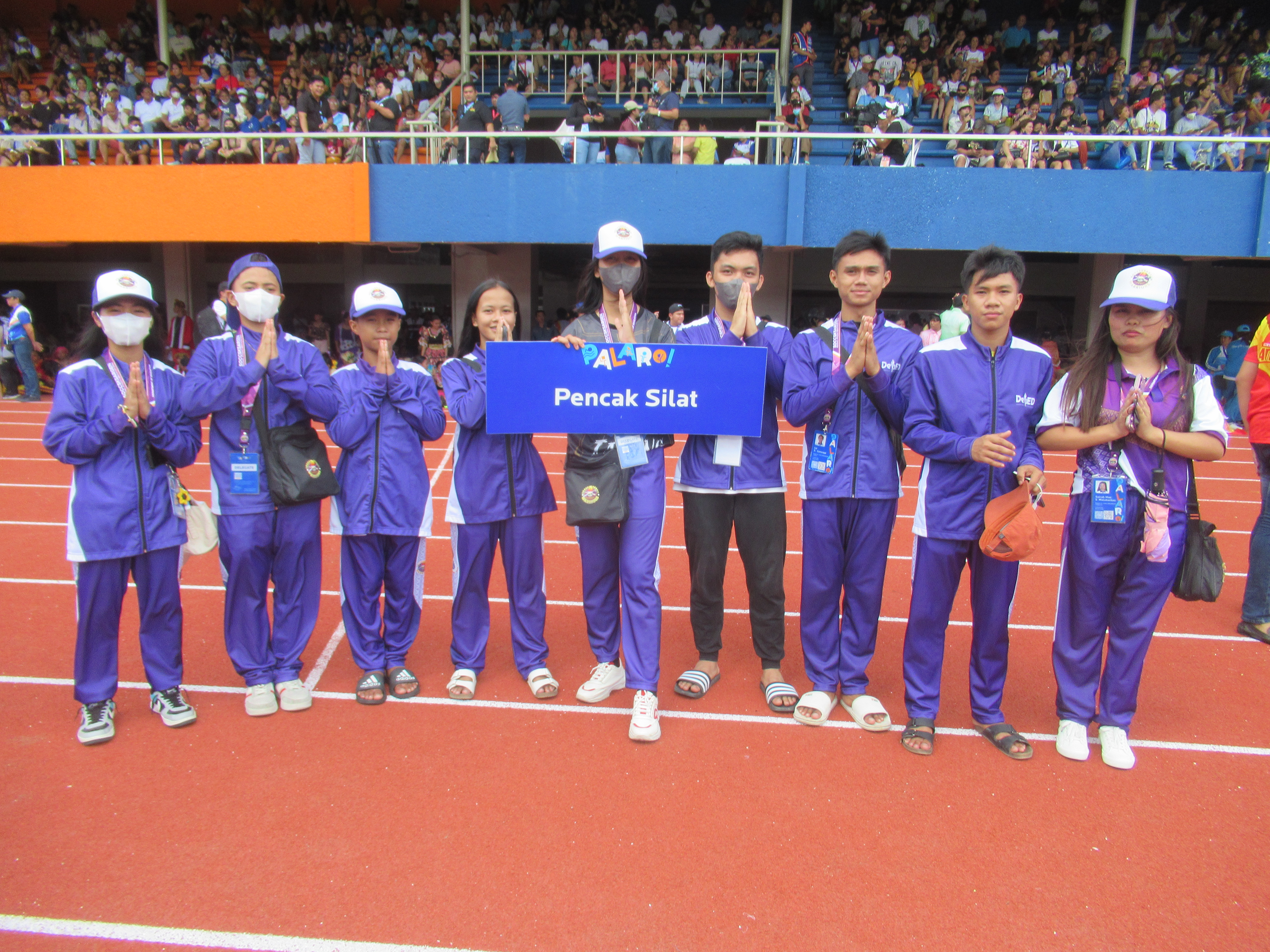
Clusters - delegations of 34 sports disciplines

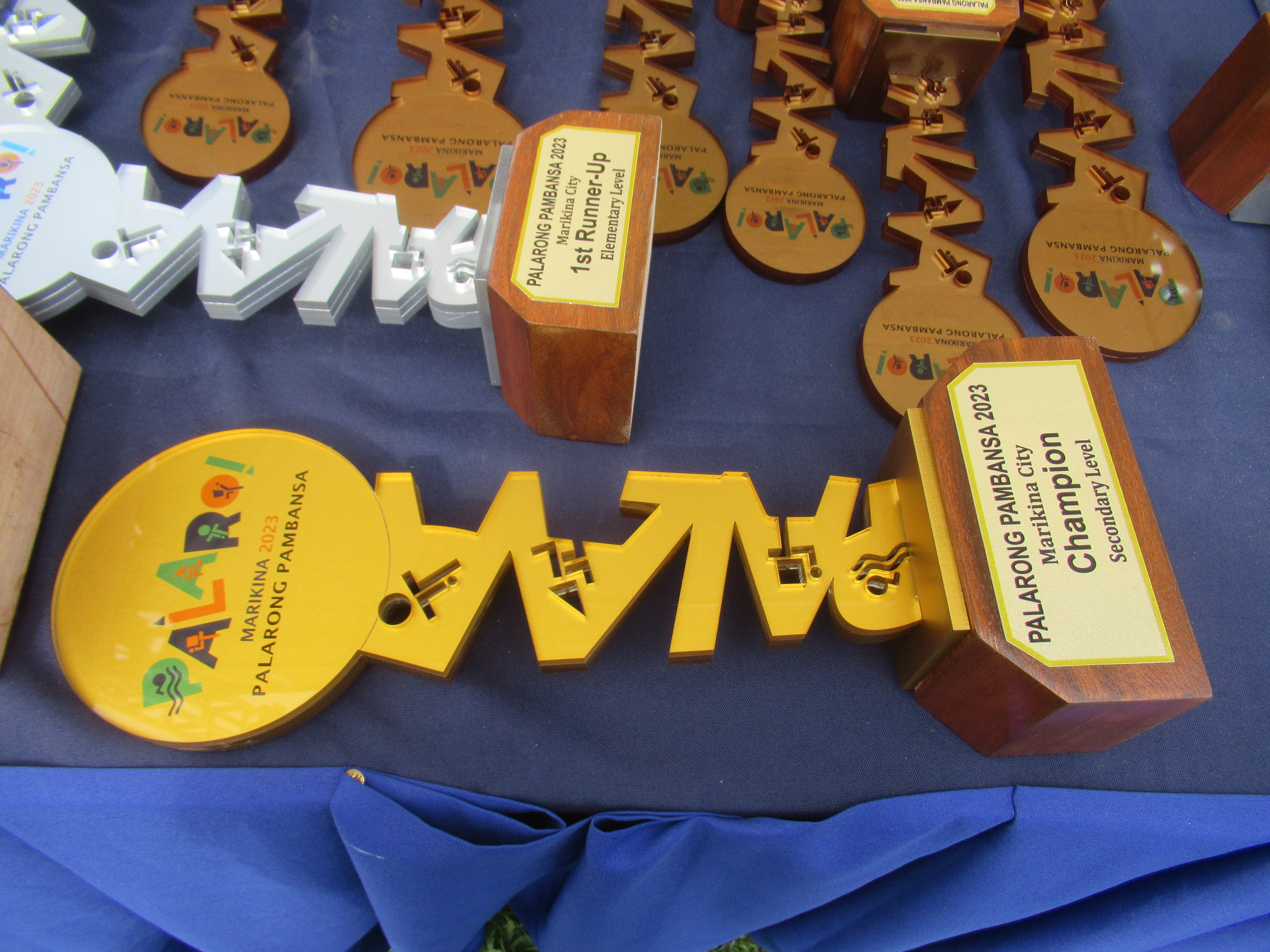
Trophies

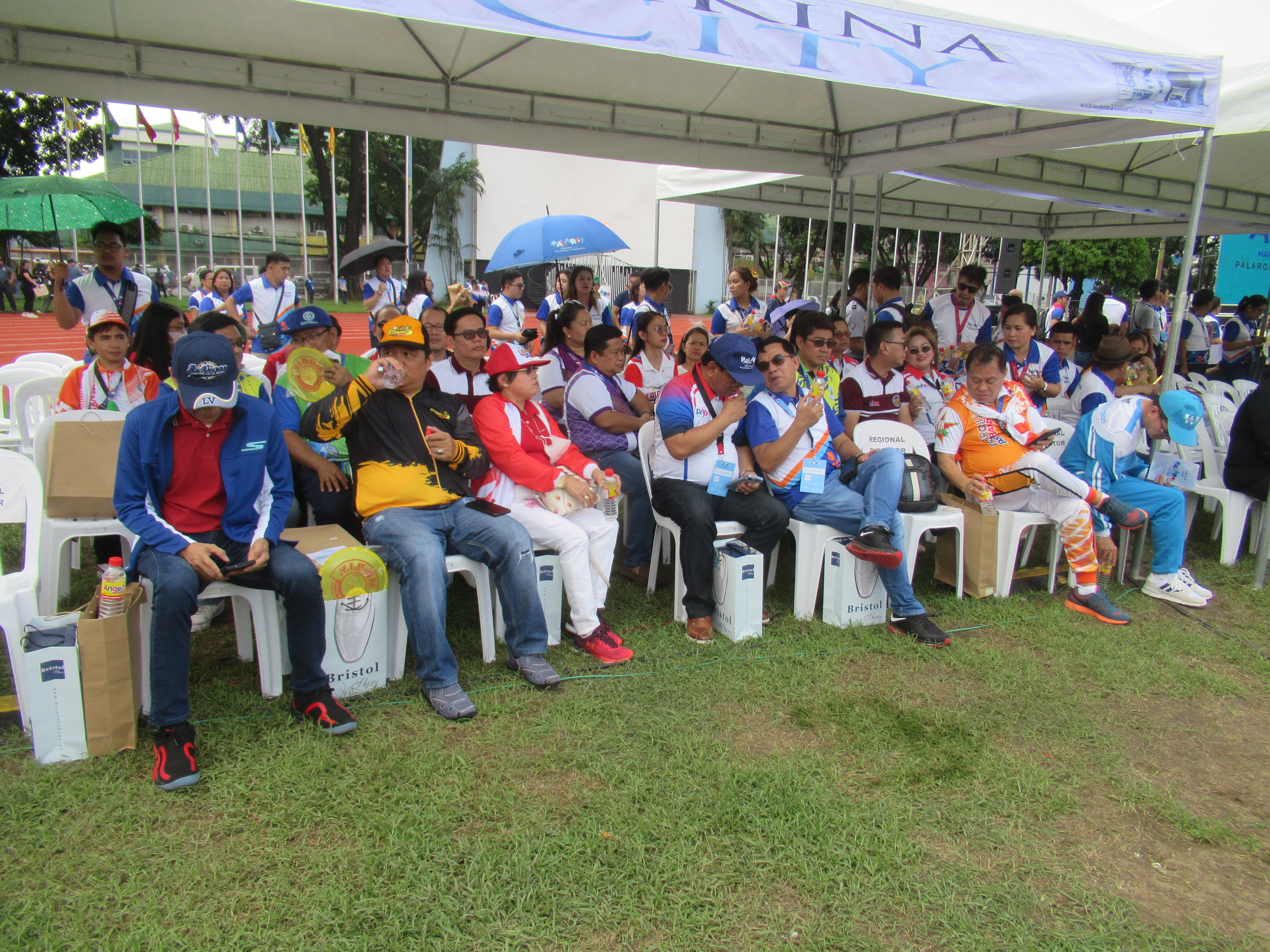
DepEd Regional Directors

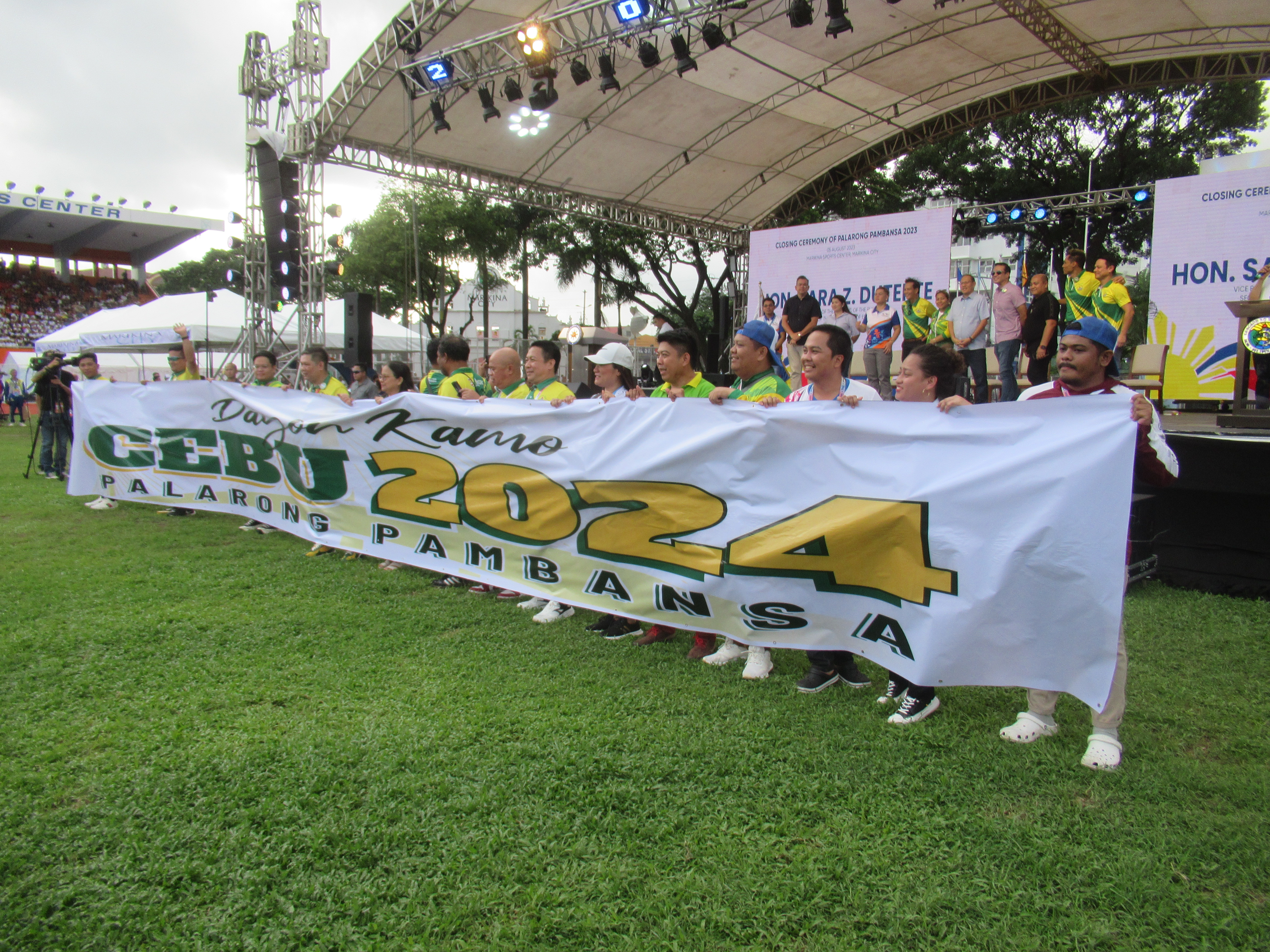
2024 Palarong Pambansa host Cebu City

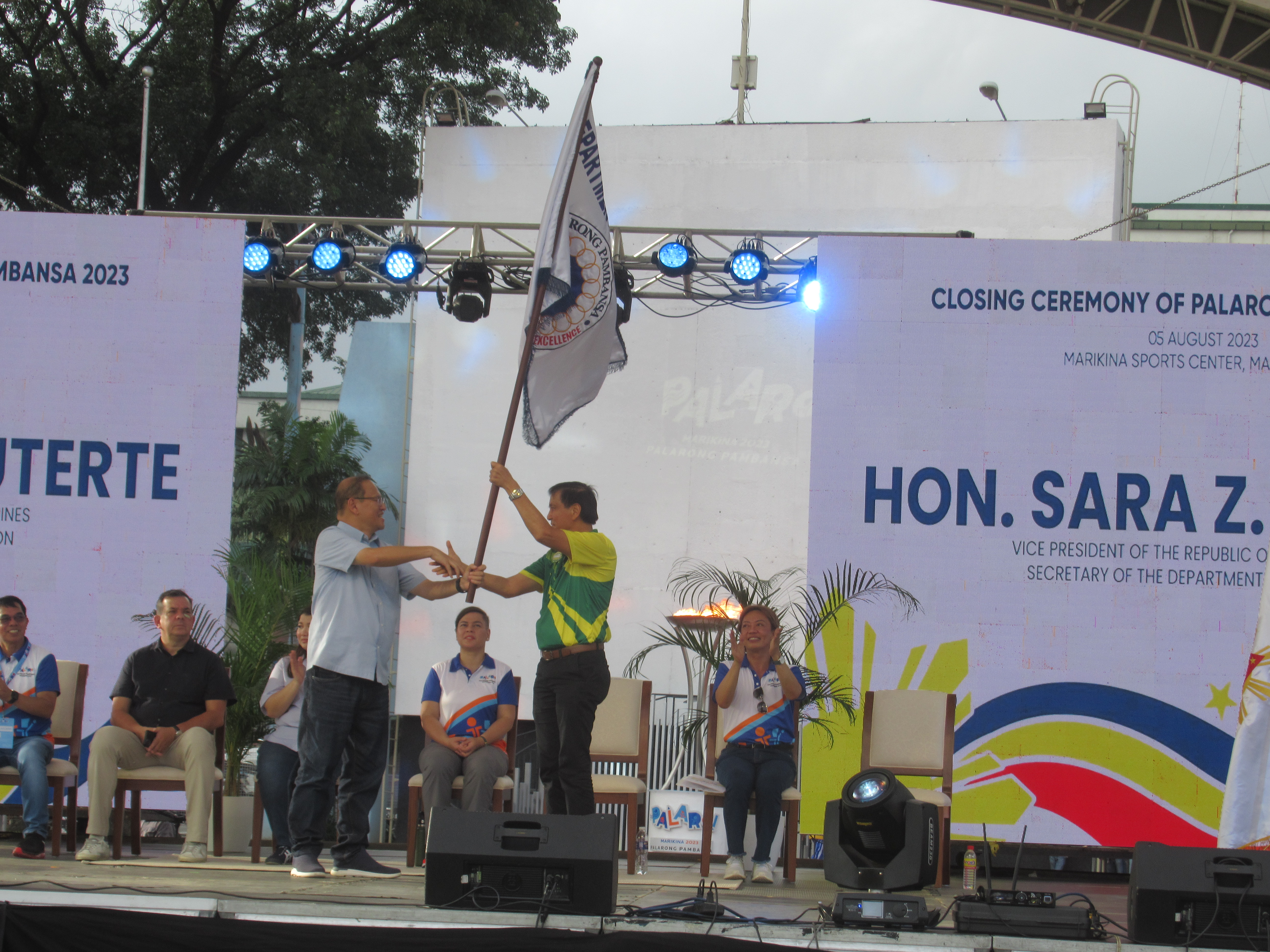
Handover of Palarong Pambansa Flag

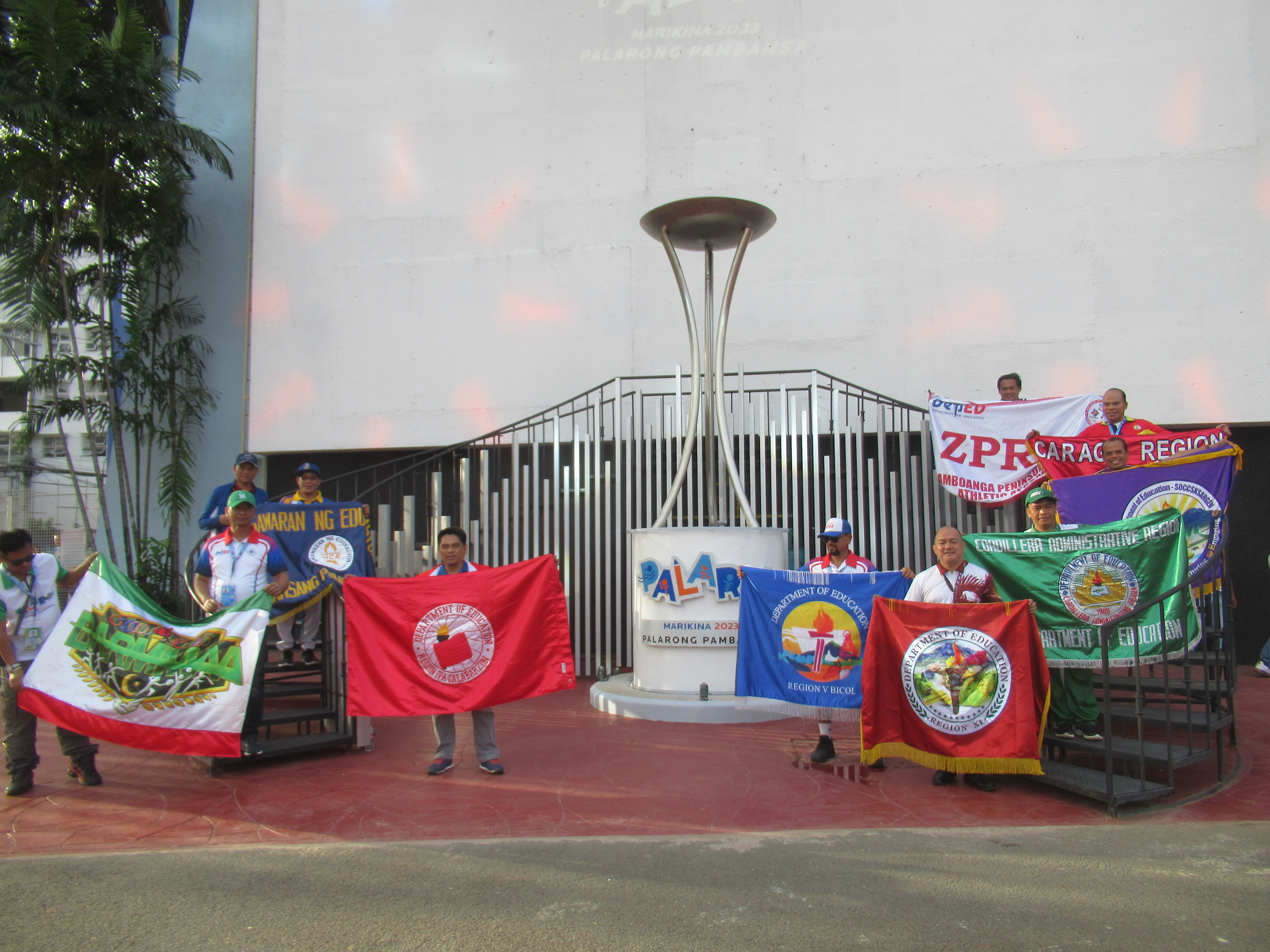
Flag bearers after extinction of the Palarong Pambansa flame
