= Marikina Town Center =

Mixed-use development in Marikina

Project
- Developer: Federal Land
- Website: Marikina Town Center

Physical features
- Transport: 3 Sumulong Highway

Location
- Location in Metro Manila, Philippines
- Coordinates: 14.6347°N 121.1030°E
- Country: Philippines
- Location: Santo Niño, Marikina City, Metro Manila, Philippines

Marikina Town Center is a mixed-use development in Marikina City, Metro Manila, Philippines. Located along Sumulong Highway and Gil Fernando Avenue, the development is a project of Federal Land, Inc.

Marikina Town Center includes residential condominiums, malls, offices, sports facilities, and open spaces. One of Marikina Town Center's features is a 100x68 meter FIFA-certified football field.

== Features ==
=== Residential ===
- Marquinton Residences
- Siena Towers Residences
- Tropicana Garden City Residences

=== Shopping and retail ===
- Blue Wave Mall Marikina
- Siena Lifestyle Mall (under construction)
- S&R Membership Shopping Marikina
- Uniqlo Sumulong Highway

=== Sports ===
- Blue Wave Sports Deck
- Marikina Town Center Football Field

=== Other facilities ===
- Blue Wave Standalone Drive-thru Corner
- Ford Marikina
- Toyota Cars
- Toyota Tamaraw Food Park

== Gallery ==
Toyota Marikina

Blue Wave Mall Marikina

== See also ==
- Riverbanks Center
