= Araneta City Cyberpark =

Office complex in Quezon City, Philippines

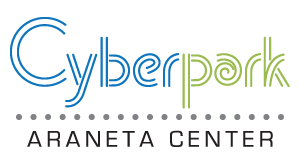

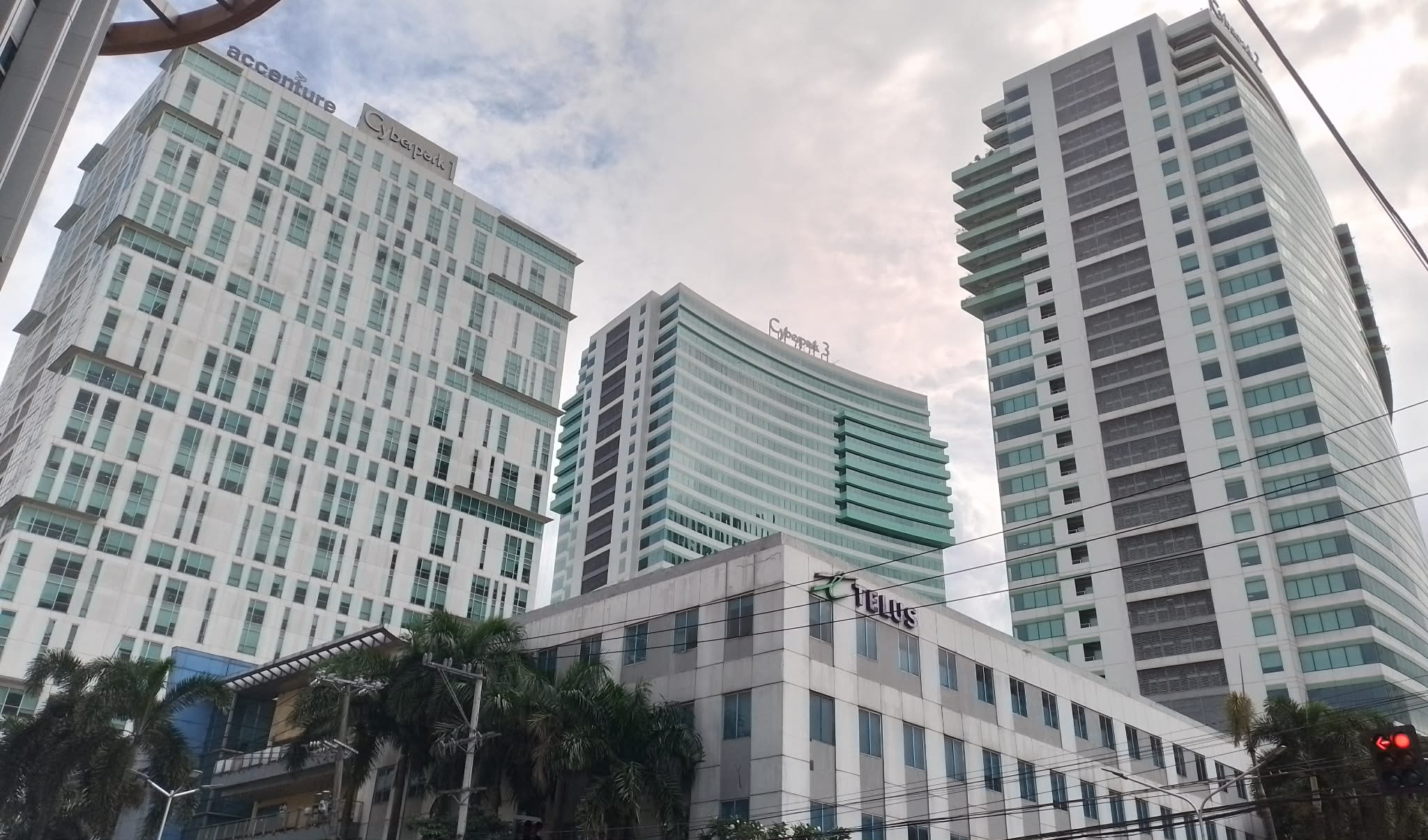
- Araneta City Cyberpark in 2025

General information
- Status: Under Development
- Type: Office
- Location: Gen. Aguinaldo Ave. cor. Gen. McArthur Ave., Araneta City, Quezon City, Metro Manila, Philippines
- Coordinates: 14°37′07″N 121°03′16″E
- Construction started: 2007 (Telus, APAC, EGS House); 2014 (Cyberpark Tower 1); 2016 (Cyberpark Tower 2); 2019 (Cyberpark Tower 3)
- Completed: 2008 (Telus, APAC, EGS House); 2016 (Cyberpark Tower 1); 2018 (Cyberpark Tower 2); 2025(Cyberpark Tower 3)
- Opening: 2008 (Telus, APAC, EGS House); 2016 (Cyberpark Tower 1); 2018 (Cyberpark Tower 2); 2025 (Cyberpark Tower 3)
- Cost: ₱20 billion ($394.88 million) ₱4 billion per tower (estimate)
- Owner: ACI Inc.
- Operator: ACI Inc.

Height
- Roof: 122 m (400 ft) (Cyberpark Tower 1 including helipad); 126 m (413 ft) (Cyberpark Tower 2 and Tower 3 including helipad)

Technical details
- Floor count: 30 (Cyberpark Tower 1); 31 (Cyberpark Tower 2 & Tower 3); 3 Basement Parking Levels
- Floor area: 288,000 m^{2} (3,100,006.20 sq ft) (completed); 550,000 m^{2} (5,920,150.73 sq ft) (upon completion)
- Lifts/elevators: 12 Smart High-Speed Elevators (All Towers)

Design and construction
- Architect: ASYA Design
- Developer: ACI Inc.
- Main contractor: Metro Stonerich (Telus & Alorica House); Megawide Construction Corporation (Tower 1 & Tower 2); Datem Incorporated (Tower 3)

Website
- www.aranetacenter.net/cyberpark/index.php www.aranetagroup.com/cyberpark/cyberpark-masterplan.php www.aranetacitycyberpark.com

The Araneta City Cyberpark is an 8-hectare (20-acre) PEZA certified office development located within the Araneta City in Cubao, Quezon City. Located along the southern area of the mixed-use commercial development, the office complex is part of the Araneta City Master Plan and is currently undergoing a ₱20 billion redevelopment project under a new master plan which began in 2012. The present master plan consists of five green office towers, commercial spaces, and an outdoor park situated in between the complex. The office complex is designed by ASYA Design while ACI Inc. serves as the owner and developer of the project, which already has 3 towers completed and a total floor area of 288,000 m^{2} (3,100,006.20 sq ft) of office space as of September 2025.

== History ==
=== First Master Plan (2007-2008) ===
The Araneta City Cyberpark forms as part of the Araneta Center master plan that was unveiled in 2000 to accommodate business process outsourcing and information technology (BPO-IT) companies. The 8 hectares (20 acres) property sits along Gen. Aguinaldo, Gen. Araneta, and Gen. McArthur Avenues, and is also situated along the Araneta jeepney terminal servicing areas around Quezon City and the Province of Rizal, and the private Araneta White House (Bahay na Puti) complex. The development also sits on the former lot occupied by Fiesta Carnival, a 2 hectares (4.9 acres) amusement park formerly occupying the Shopwise Hypermarket complex. As the carnival declined in the 1990s due to rising competition from other amusement parks, mall-based entertainment, political unrest, and other technological shifts, the Araneta Group decided to move the carnival into an open lot located in the south west corner lot of the complex, across SM Cubao. The outdoor complex experienced a decline in patronages due to rising competition between amusement parks and mall-based entertainment, and was completely closed down years later.

The present site of the Telus House once served as a home to several various establishments, such as the former Josephine Restaurant, a Filipino restaurant that once opened its doors in 1972 before becoming the former site of the Automatic Centre before relocating beside the former Rustan's Superstore in 2008, and later became the Value Station store in 2002, which eventually closed its operations in 2007 to give way for the redevelopment project.

The Cyberpark project emerged in the late 1990s to 2001, as the growth of the business process outsourcing firms being founded in the country attracted foreign and local investments, which also contributed to the creation of jobs in various sectors, and enabling the country to take a spot in the global outsourcing market in 2005 by attributing a total average of 3% of the total global output, making the BPO industry one of the fastest growing industries in the country. Developments for BPO related industries flourished further during the Arroyo administration as part of their economic programs.

In response to the successful launches of various BPO companies, the Araneta Group launched the Cyberpark Master Plan in 2000, which also began to develop similar properties to cater the rapid rise of the industry, starting with the completion of the Gateway Office Building in 2005, which is primarily occupied by Accenture. The Cyberpark also became part of the broader Araneta Center Redevelopment Plan in 2006 and the first master plan was laid out in 2007, and began construction in the same year, before being completed in 2008. The complex is composed of 2 4-storey low-rise buildings, with 5 additional low rise buildings considered during the early planning phases. The two buildings were occupied by companies, such as Telus, APAC Customer Services Inc., Advanced Contact Solutions, Agentworx Contact Solutions, and Expert Global Solutions.

=== Updated Master Plan (2012-present) ===
Following the initial development, the Araneta Group pursued a newer master plan to increase office spaces in the area. Planning for the revised development began in 2012 and was completed in 2014. ACI Inc. also tapped ASYA Design to serve as the main architectural firm for the development plan.

The updated plans laid out consists of 5 PEZA certified and LEED-approved towers, with 3 levels of retail podium spaces, surrounding the future Gateway Mall 3 set to rise in the middle of the complex. The master plan will also have an open-air outdoor park with an intersecting road in between the towers, 5 levels for retail, and foot bridges to surrounding malls and nearby buildings. The redevelopment master plan was set to cost ₱20 billion and commenced with the construction of Cyberpark Tower 1 in April 2014, followed by the Cyberpark Tower 2 in February 2016, and the Cyberpark Tower 3 in 2023. The development is also outlined to interconnect all office towers within the Cyberpark through the complex's basement parking and retail levels, and will also include a planned road extension of Gen. Araneta Avenue, linking the road to the P. Tuazon Boulevard. The targeted completion of the entire office complex is set within 2030.

== Location and features ==
Located within the southern corridor of the Araneta City complex, and is flanked by buildings within the Gateway Square superblock development from the north, primarily by buildings such as the Gateway Mall 2, the Parking Garage South, and the Novotel Manila Araneta City; the Farmers Garden and the Araneta White House on the west, and SM Araneta City in the east.

The development is also connected to major transport hubs such as the MRT-3 Araneta Center-Cubao Station, the LRT-2 Araneta Center-Cubao Station and transport terminals, primarily attracting business process outsourcing and corporate services companies. The complex also features a variety of green initiatives and an ultra-high-speed fiber optic network infrastructure, enhancing the city's network connectivity, capable of reaching 5G networks, in collaboration with Smart Communications and PLDT.

== Structures ==
The Araneta City Cyberpark consists of five LEED-approved towers, interconnected with direct connections with the proposed Gateway Mall 3 and other properties within the Araneta City. The following table lies the current updates of the towers as of January 2026:

Name	Image	Construction started	Completion	Height	Current status
Telus House		2007; 19 years ago	2008; 18 years ago		Completed
Cyberpark Tower 1		April 2014; 12 years ago	May 2016; 10 years ago	122 m (400 ft)	Completed
Cyberpark Tower 2		February 2016; 10 years ago	December 2018; 7 years ago	126 m (413 ft)	Completed
Cyberpark Tower 3		June 2019; 7 years ago	August 2025; 1 year ago	126 m (413 ft)	Completed
Cyberpark Tower 4					Under conceptual stage
Cyberpark Tower 5					Under conceptual stage

=== Buildings ===
The Cyberpark Tower 1 and the Telus House, taken from the Farmers Market (2021)

Araneta City Cyberpark at night (2022)

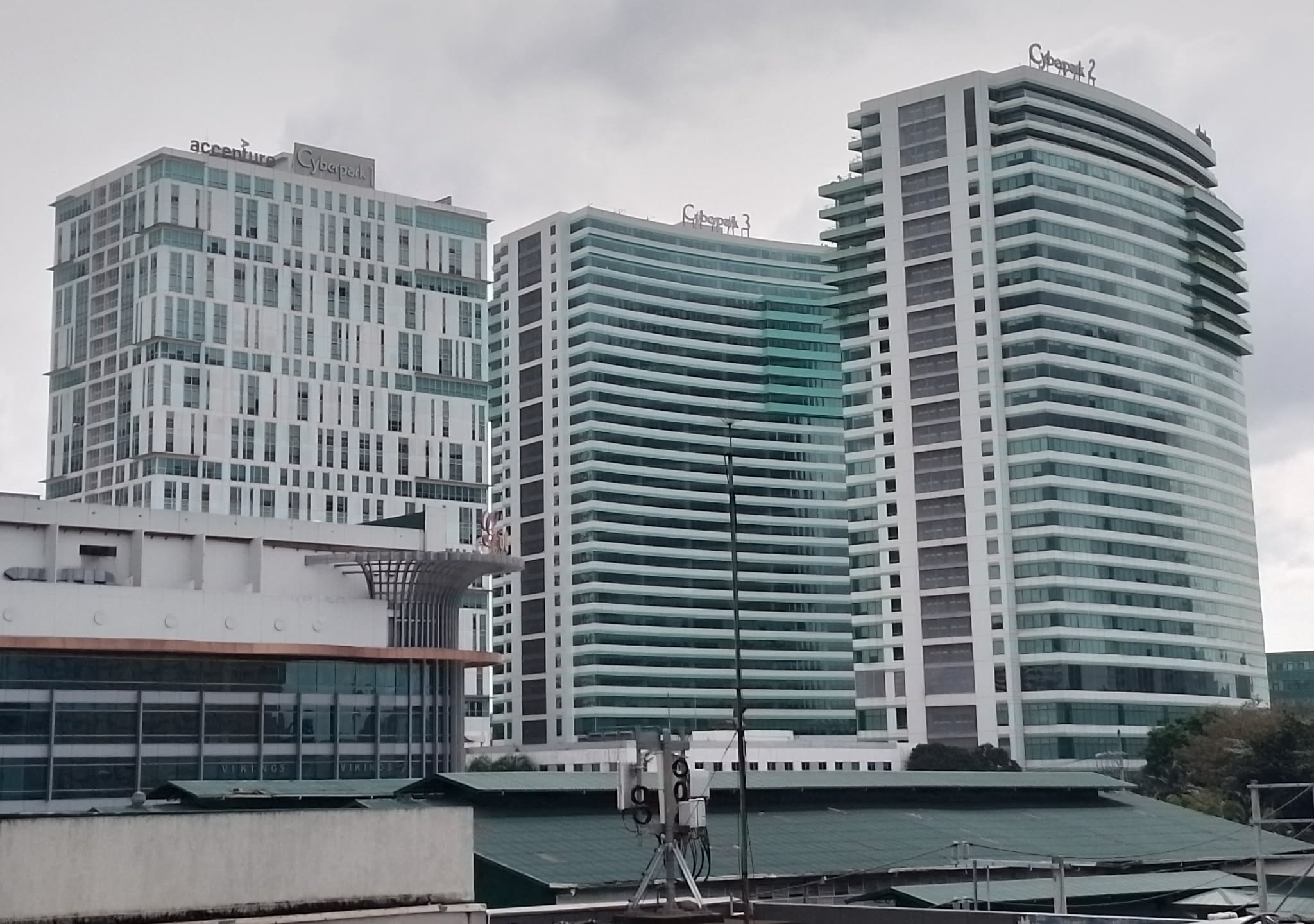
The Cyberpark as seen from the MRT-3 Araneta Center-Cubao station (2026)

==== Telus House ====
The Telus House is one of the first low-rise, 4-storey buildings in the original Cyberpark plan completed in 2008, and formerly housed Telus as its main tenant. The building has 15,000 m^{2} (160,000 sq ft) of total office space, and features retail stores and restaurants located at the ground floor.

The building will soon be demolished in order to give way for the construction of the Gateway Mall 3, a 5-storey 100,000 m^{2} (1,100,000 sq ft) expansion project of the Gateway Mall, and the Cyberpark Tower 4. The future development will feature eco-friendly initiatives, additional retail spaces and an elevated, green, outdoor park, and is currently on the planning stage.

==== Cyberpark Tower 1 ====
The Cyberpark Tower 1 is the first tower of the project, and standing 30 storeys high on the former EGS parking lot. Formerly known as the "Gateway Tower 2" project, after the Gateway Tower located two blocks away from the tower, the construction of the tower started in February 2014, and was completed in May 2016. The Cyberpark Tower 1 has a total floor area of 94,000 m^{2} (1,011,807.58 sq ft) of office space, with 3 basement parking levels and 3 retail levels. The tower also features an asymmetrical window facade with floor-to-ceiling double glazed windows for energy efficiency, a rainwater collection system, and solar panels located at the tower's roof deck, in partnership with Meralco's subsidiary Spectrum.

The tower currently houses a variety of business process outsourcing companies such as Intouch CX, ProbeCX, The Vibal Group, and Accenture, which serves as the tower's main tenant, aside from its current operations within the Gateway Tower. In 2019, Accenture began relocating their business activities from the Gateway Office Building to the Cyberpark Tower 1 in order to cater the company's expansion, which was completed in 2022, while ProbeCX occupies the fifth floor and Intouch CX occupies the tenth floor of the tower.

Other key tenants include The Association of Foundations Phils., Inc. at the third floor; the Philippine Pizza Inc. (PPI), a subsidiary of the Araneta Group hosts their headquarters at the sixth floor of the tower after relocating their operations from the Aurora Tower, the company's former headquarters in 2019. The 7th floor accommodates The Malayan Insurance Company Inc. Cubao Branch; Cibo main office; and PartnerHero, which opened their first private office in the country in November 2022. On 31 August 2023, Everise became the tower's latest tenant, and serves as the company's first branch in Quezon City, and occupies office spaces on the tower's fourth floor.

One of the planned original tenants of the tower was Expert Global Solutions (EGS), after the company announced its plans to relocate their operation to the tower in early 2016. However, after lengthy negotiations with the Araneta Group and Alorica's acquisition of EGS, the plan was cancelled and the company decided to temporarily maintain their operations to the Alorica Building until March 2019, as the company moved its operations to the nearby Cyberpark Tower 2. The tower is also planned be directly connected to the upcoming Gateway Mall 3, and the Cyberpark Tower 4.

The tower's commercial level area is also occupied by gyms, beauty services stalls, banks, a 7-Eleven convenience store; restaurants, food stalls and coffee stores such as Taco Bell, CoCo Fresh Tea & Juice and Starbucks; and The Medical City Clinic Cubao Branch. The tower is also connected to nearby SM Cubao via Elevated Bridge.

==== Cyberpark Tower 2 ====
The Cyberpark Tower 2 is the second tower of the project, standing 31 storeys high on the former Jeepney Terminal servicing areas within Quezon City and the Province of Rizal, the Cyberpark Tower 2 has 97,000 m^{2} (1,044,099.31 sq ft) of office space, featuring a curved building design, floor-to-ceiling double-glazed energy-efficient windows, smart elevators, side balconies with planters, solar panels on the tower's rooftop, and a rainwater recovery system. The final design of the tower was initially planned to include vertical trellises and erect a spire from the tower's side balconies, which was scrapped during the tower's construction phase. Groundbreaking for the construction of the tower started in February 2016, while construction works began on the 3rd quarter of 2016, and was topped off in March 2018, before being fully completed in December 2018, as tenants and stores began occupying the tower.

The tower has 3 basement parking levels with 2 levels of retail spaces and its main tenants include Ibex, which also occupies multiple floors of the tower, and Alorica, occupying 7 floors aboveground and a recruitment hub located at the ground floor of the tower. The tower is also housed by the ACI Inc.'s Cyberpark office. Other BPO tenants include Acquire BPO; RingCentral Philippines, which occupies the 26th floor of the tower; and Offshore Business Processing, which occupies the 27th floor of the tower. In February 2023, R1 RCM, an American healthcare BPO company also occupies office spaces in the building. Blue Horizons Travel & Tours and RF3 World Philippines hosts their headquarters and share office spaces on the upper ground floor of the tower. On the third quarter of 2024, Genesys has relocated its operations to the Cyberpark Tower 2 from the nearby Cyberpark Tower 1, and occupies the tower's 22nd floor. The tower is also occupied by banks, convenience stores, food stalls, and restaurants within the tower's commercial levels.

==== Cyberpark Tower 3 ====
The Cyberpark Tower 3 is third tower of the project and is the latest tower to be completed within the complex, and currently rises on the former Alorica (EGS) Building site. The tower will be similarly designed to the Cyberpark Tower 2, standing 31 storeys high, and having 97,000 m^{2} (1,044,099.31 sq ft) of office spaces, while having 91,000 m^{2} (979,515.85 sq ft) of gross floor area. The tower also features a curved building design with floor-to-ceiling double-glazed energy-efficient windows, smart elevators, side balconies with planters, solar panels, and a rainwater recovery system. The demolition of the Alorica Building began in June 2019, while the groundbreaking for the construction of the tower started afterwards, in September 2019. The tower is originally slated to be completed in 2022, however, due to the effects of the COVID-19 pandemic in the Philippines, as well as market driven factors, financial problems and a case settlement with Megawide Construction Corporation regarding the construction issues of the Cyberpark Tower 2, the Gateway Mall 2 and the Ibis Styles Araneta City, the construction of the tower was temporarily delayed. In August 2022, the general contractor for the project was awarded to Datem Incorporated, while the tower's groundbreaking phase continued in December 2022. On 6 February 2023, the first concrete pouring of the tower began in a ceremony attended by various Araneta Group officials, along with Binibining Pilipinas contestants. The tower is expected to be completed within the first quarter of 2025.

On June 27, 2024, the tower was officially topped off and was attended by officials of the Araneta Group; JLL Philippines, which serves as the Araneta City's real estate advisor, and Telus, which serves as the tower's main tenant, as the company relocated its overall operations to the tower from the Telus House, and will occupy 6 floors of the tower. Telus formally began relocating its operations to the tower in January 2026 as the company opened its offices and its recruitment hub located at the ground floor, while also hosting various amenities such as a pantry area, locker rooms, a clinic, a lactation room, a sleeping room, meeting rooms, a gym, and a digital library. The tower was originally aimed to be completed in the second quarter of 2025, but was later completed in August 2025 as future tenants begin their fit-out interior works within the tower, and on 3 October 2025, a mass was held on the tower's main lobby.

==== Cyberpark Tower 4 ====
The Cyberpark Tower 4 is the fourth tower of the project, which will rise as a 30-storey office building, and is planned to be built on the current site of the Telus House and across Cyberpark Tower 2, with a direct connection to the Gateway Mall 3. The upcoming tower will feature an all-glass facade and will also have the same green features with its predecessors. The tower is currently on the planning stages and is aimed to be completed within the next five years.

==== Cyberpark Tower 5 ====
The fifth and final office building planned in the Cyberpark complex, which is currently in the planning stages. The Cyberpark Tower 5 is a planned 40-storey office building planned to be built on the Araneta City Jeepney Terminal and the private Araneta White House complex, which includes the Colombian Honorary Consulate. The tower will be located alongside the Cyberpark Tower 2, the Cyberpark Tower 3, and P. Tuazon Boulevard. The planned tower will feature an oval-shaped building design patterned with an all-glass facade, and is currently in the planning stages of development, which is targeted to be completed within the next five years.
