= VASS (digital) =

VASS is a digital solutions company present in 26 countries in Europe, America and Asia. It was founded in 1999 in Madrid. It has been under the majority ownership of the US company One Equity Partners (ONE) since 2020.

== Founding ==
VASS stands for "Value Added Solutions and Services". The company was founded in 1999 by Spanish economist Franciso Javier Latasa. Both the initials of the name and the design of the logo were inspired by the firm and the name of the founder's grandfather, the Cádiz sculptor Juan Luis Vassallo.

The company began by installing systems that enabled companies to manage their human resources, financial accounting, production and logistics. In 2006, the company opened an office in Barcelona, and in 2007 another in London.

From 2010, the company expanded internationally to the United States, Mexico, Colombia, Chile, Peru and Amsterdam. In late 2020, the company was acquired by venture capital firm One Equity Partners (OEP), which continues to expand by acquiring technology companies and creating new ones.

== Expansion ==
Its ecosystem includes customer experience, cloud computing, artificial intelligence, cybersecurity, software engineering and banking. From 2006, the Spanish company expanded with the creation of Serbatic, an ICT services company. In 2008, Nateevo, a digital marketing company (formerly Montejava and Vass Digital) was created. In 2011, new business lines were created: enterprise mobility and global digital strategy, and ISO/IEC 20000 and ISO/IEC 270015 certifications were obtained. The company opened its headquarters in Parque Empresarial La Moraleja (Alcobendas, Madrid) in 2016; and in 2018 the group created vdSHOP, a fullcommerce company.

Following the majority investment by One Equity Partners (OEP), the expansion continued with the acquisition of the cybersecurity group CRI Group (Luxembourg), Ecenta AG (German SAP technology and customer strategy company), and Comunytek (systems and products for wholesale banking and capital markets). New companies were also established, such as T4S Advanced Solutions (SAP consultancy).

In 2022, the group acquired One Inside (the Swiss technology company Adobe), Movetia (a Spanish digital services company for the automotive and financial industries), Hexagon Data (a Mexican digital marketing automation company), Zington (a Swedish digital technology consultancy), and Intelygenz (a Spanish artificial intelligence company).

In 2023, VASS bought Copilot (a US software consultancy), PSKinetic (a UK company that brings AI to the financial sector), and Pia Relations (a Swedish CRM and cloud services consultancy).
