= Expert Global Solutions =

American call center company

Expert Global Solutions, Inc. (EGS)
- Company type: Private
- Industry: Business Process Outsourcing; Accounts Receivable Management; Customer Relationship Management; Back Office Services
- Founded: 2012
- Headquarters: United States
- Number of locations: Over 100 Globally
- Revenue: Approximately 2 billion USD
- Owner: One Equity Partners
- Number of employees: ~43,000 (2012)
- Parent: Alorica
- Website: www.egscorp.com

Founded in 2012, Expert Global Solutions, Inc. (EGS, formerly NCO Group), based in Plano, Texas, was a privately owned business process outsourcing company. It is a holding company for NCO Group and APAC Customer Services, Inc. (APAC), providers of business process outsourcing services. NCO provides accounts receivable management (ARM) services, and APAC provides customer relationship management (CRM) services. EGS has over 100 locations with more than 42,000 employees. EGS was previously owned by One Equity Partners (OEP), the private investment arm of JP Morgan Chase & Co.

In 2016, the company was acquired by Alorica Inc, a California-based customer service company.

== History ==
Previously known as NCO Group, the company was purchased by APAC Customer Services in April 2012 and rebranded as Expert Global Solutions. One Equity Partners acquired APAC Customer Services in July 2011.

Alorica, the parent company of Expert Global Solutions, after its acquisition in June 2016

A portfolio company of One Equity Partners, Expert Global Solutions was acquired by Alorica in 2016.
