= Marikina Heights =

Barangay in Marikina, Metro Manila, Philippines

- Barangay
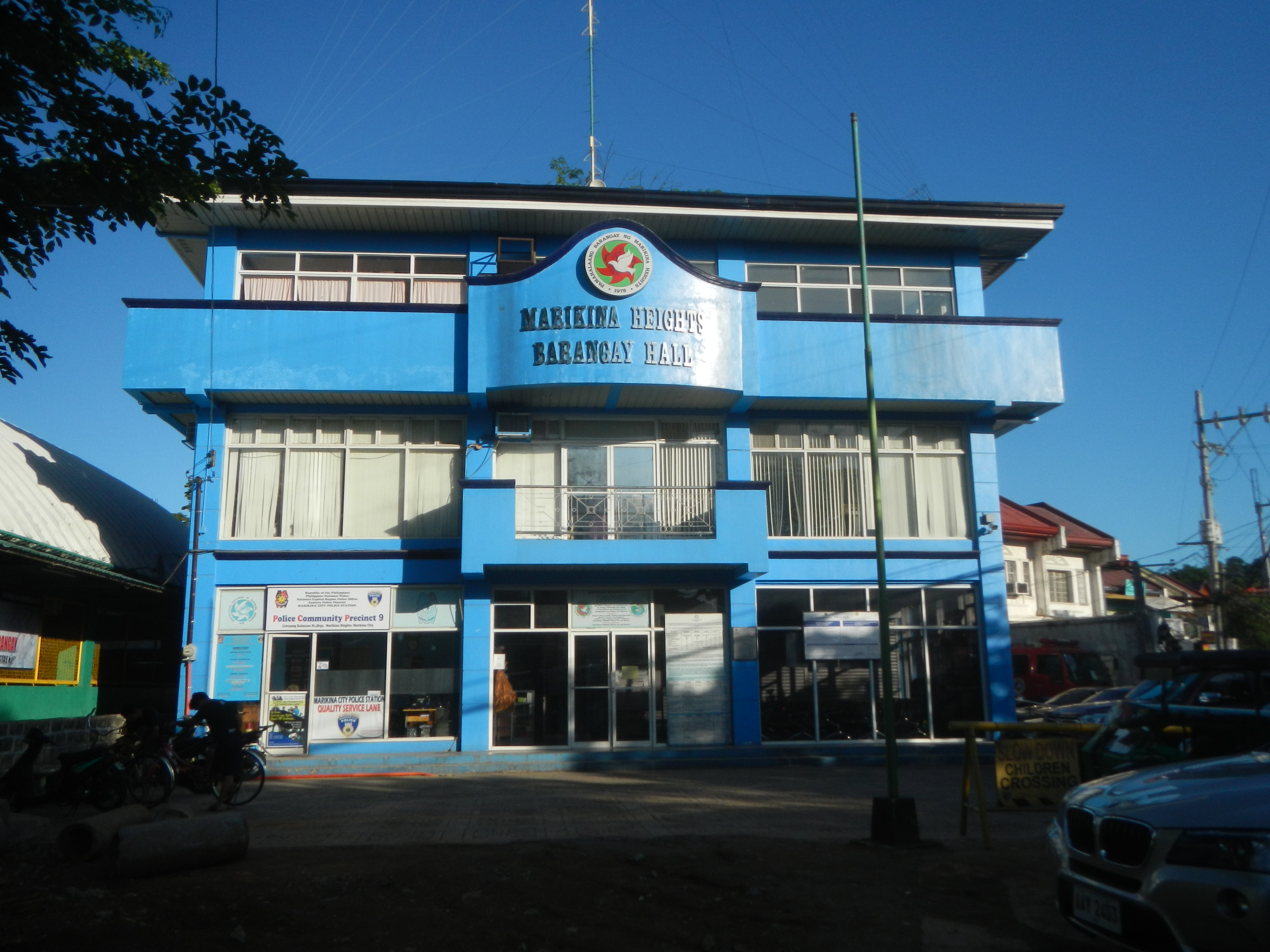
- Marikina Heights Barangay Hall
- Interactive map of Marikina Heights
- Location within Metro Manila
- Coordinates: 14°39′12.2″N 121°7′7.49″E
- Country: Philippines
- Region: National Capital Region
- City: Marikina
- District: 2nd Legislative district of Marikina

Government
  - Type: Barangay
  - Barangay Captain: Miguel Punzalan Jr.

Area
  - Total: 2.06 km^{2} (0.80 sq mi)

Population (2010)
  - Total: 38,795
  - Density: 18,800/km^{2} (48,800/sq mi)
- Time zone: UTC+8 (PST)
- Postal Code: 1810
- Area code: 02

Marikina Heights is one of the largest barangays of Marikina measuring some 206 hectares (510 acres). Once a privately owned hacienda, it is now populated by 38,795 people according to the 2010 National Census.

== History ==
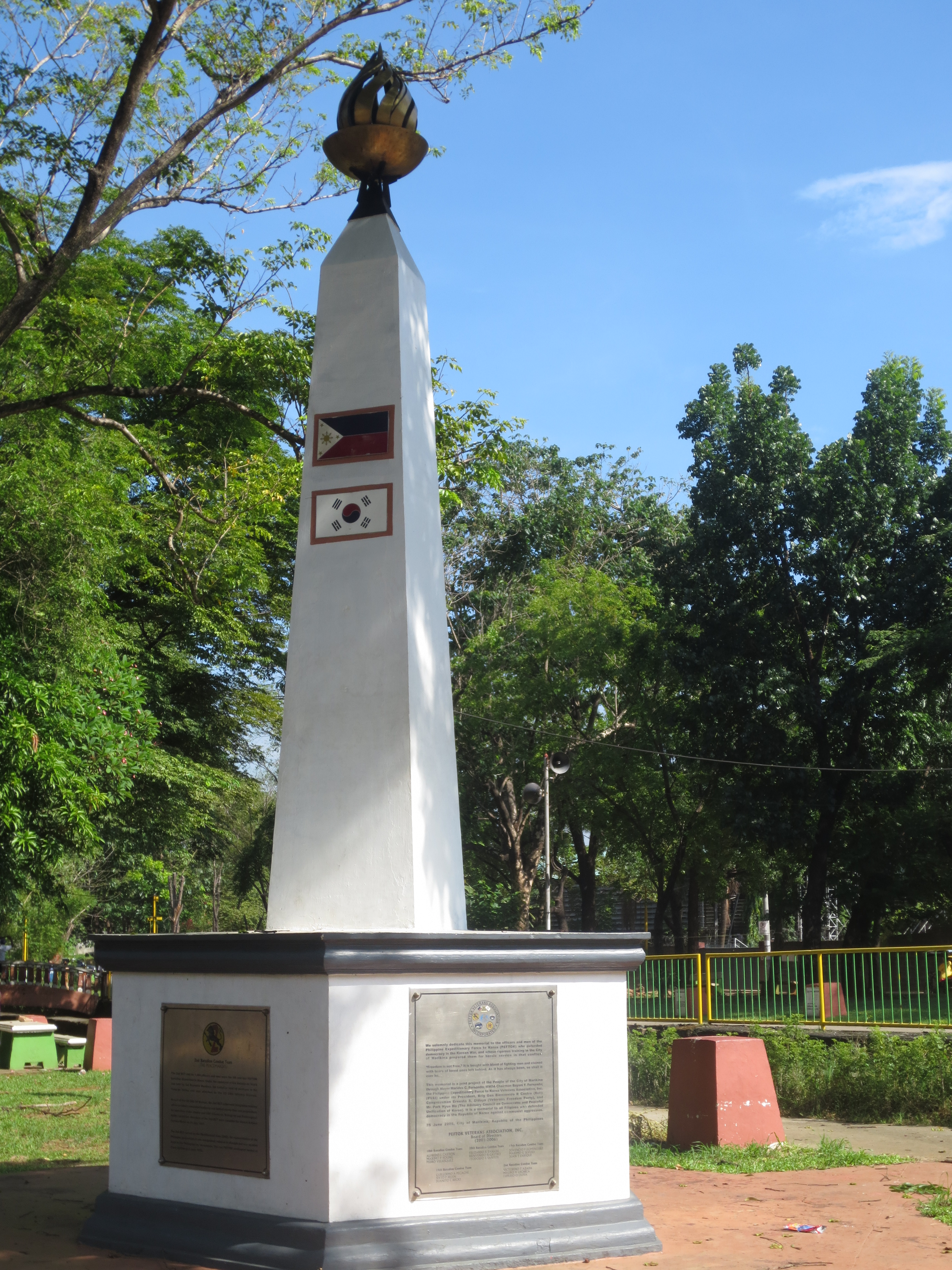
A monument is placed at the Evolution Park in Marikina Heights commemorating Filipino soldiers in the Korean War.

Before becoming a barangay in 1978, the area was once known as Sitio Mapunso and Sitio Kasuyan of barrios Bayan-Bayanan (now Concepcion) and Parang, with Champagnat Street serving as the boundary of its two mother barrios. Marikina Heights also started out as a grazing and pastureland for carabaos, cows, goats and horses. Because it was owned by the Tuason family, the Marikina Dairy Farm was established in what was now known as C&P Mall, Palmera Homes and the Tanseco Residence.

During the Japanese occupation, Marikina Heights became a vital military location as the Imperial soldiers dug through parts of the area leading to Paliparan, Sto. Nino and Concepcion where the airfields are situated. One of the said tunnels lies underneath a police sub-station along Bayan-Bayanan Avenue. When the combined Filipino and American troops retaken in Marikina Heights was defeat by the Japanese during the Allied liberation and ended in World War II.

Due to the land's terrain which resembles the highlands of South Korea, the area also became a training ground for Filipino soldiers prior to their deployment in the Korean War, thus earning the nickname "Mari-Korea".

The late 1950s witnessed the growth of the area as the Tuasons decided to develop their landholdings into the Marikina Heights subdivision. Finally, on April 2, 1978, President Ferdinand Marcos signed the Presidential Decree No. 1489, declaring Marikina Heights as another barangay in Marikina's growing populace.

== Present day ==
Marikina Heights is now a lush barangay with abundant trees and well-maintained pocket parks such as Marikina-Yeongdo Friendship Park, Marikina-Brampton Friendship Park, Liwasang Kalayaan, Marikina Hardin ng Bayan and Marikina Heights Creekside Park.

Marikina Heights also became a runner up in the cleanest waterways in the Metro Manila for its effort on maintaining the cleanliness of the barangay's creek. The barangay also won the cleanest and greenest barangay in the Philippines during the term of President Joseph Estrada from 1998 to 2001.

One of the largest vacant lots in Marikina can also be seen within Marikina Heights which serves as its memory on its hilly terrain, the foothill along Champaca Street and Tanguile and in Empress 1 Subdivision and La Milagrosa Village. Marikina's best exclusive schools are in this barangay; St. Scholastica's Academy Marikina (previously exclusively for women. Now accepts both men and women) and Marist School (previously exclusively for men. Now accepts both men and women). Ayala Malls Marikina, opened in 2017, is located here, alongside the C&B Circle Mall Marikina.

Marikina Heights is also now a developing community. Numerous commercial and modern residential developments have been popping up like Michelia Residences along General Ordoñez Street. Executive villages are also found within the barangay like the Empress 1 Subdivision, La Milagrosa Village, Marist Village, and Mansion Hills.

== Gallery ==
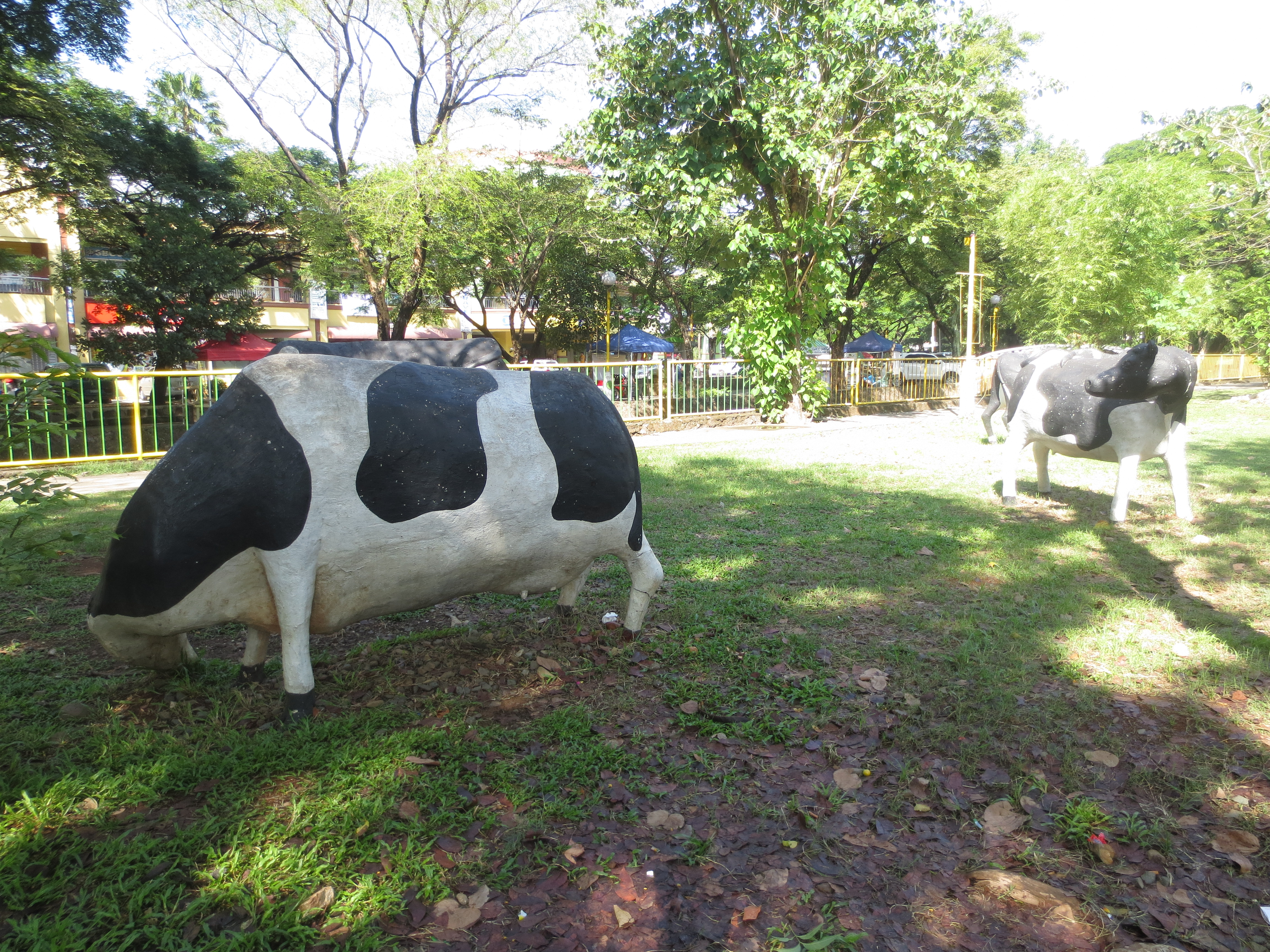
Sculpted cows are placed at the park to remind the people of the place's history as a thriving hacienda decades ago

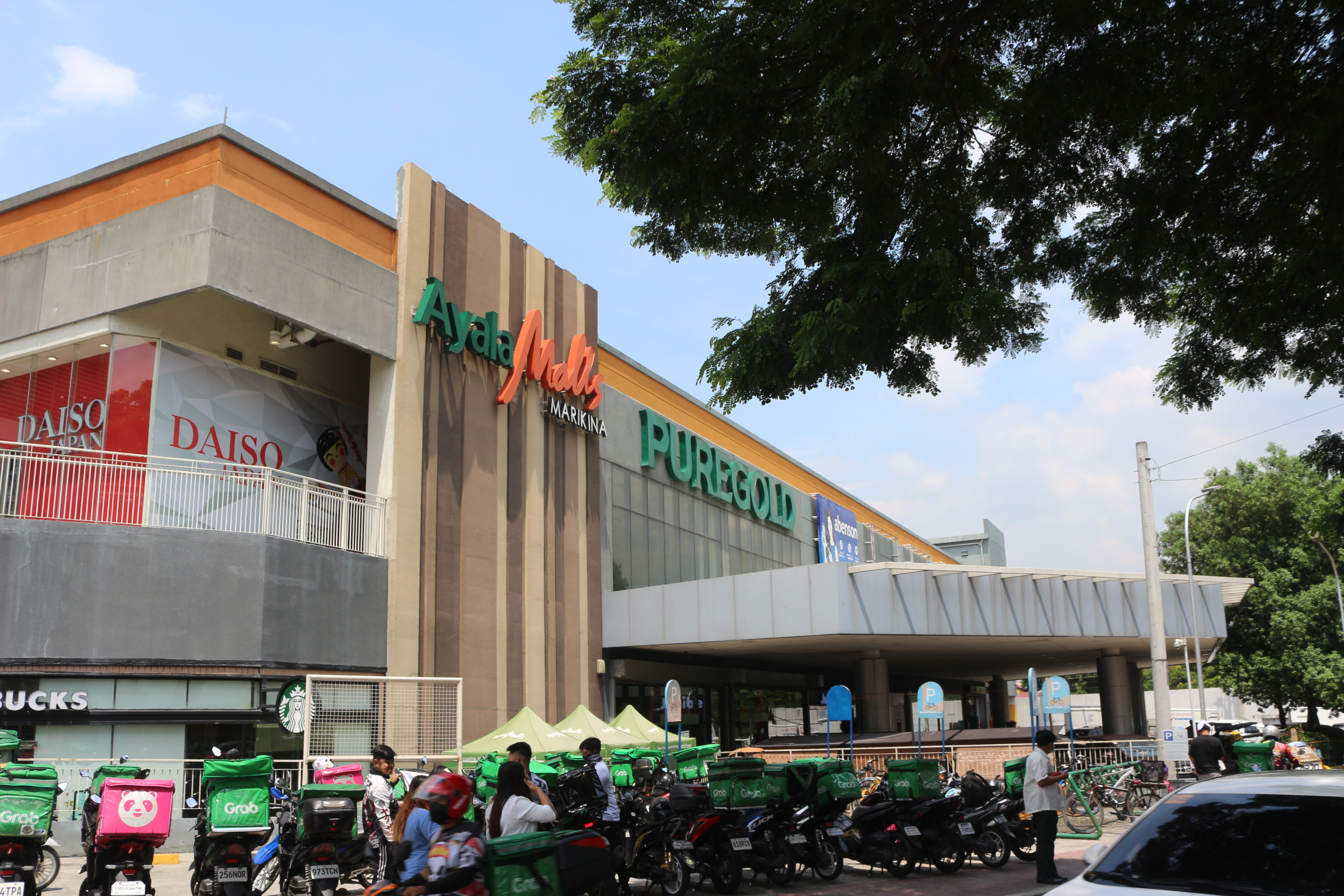
Ayala Malls Marikina

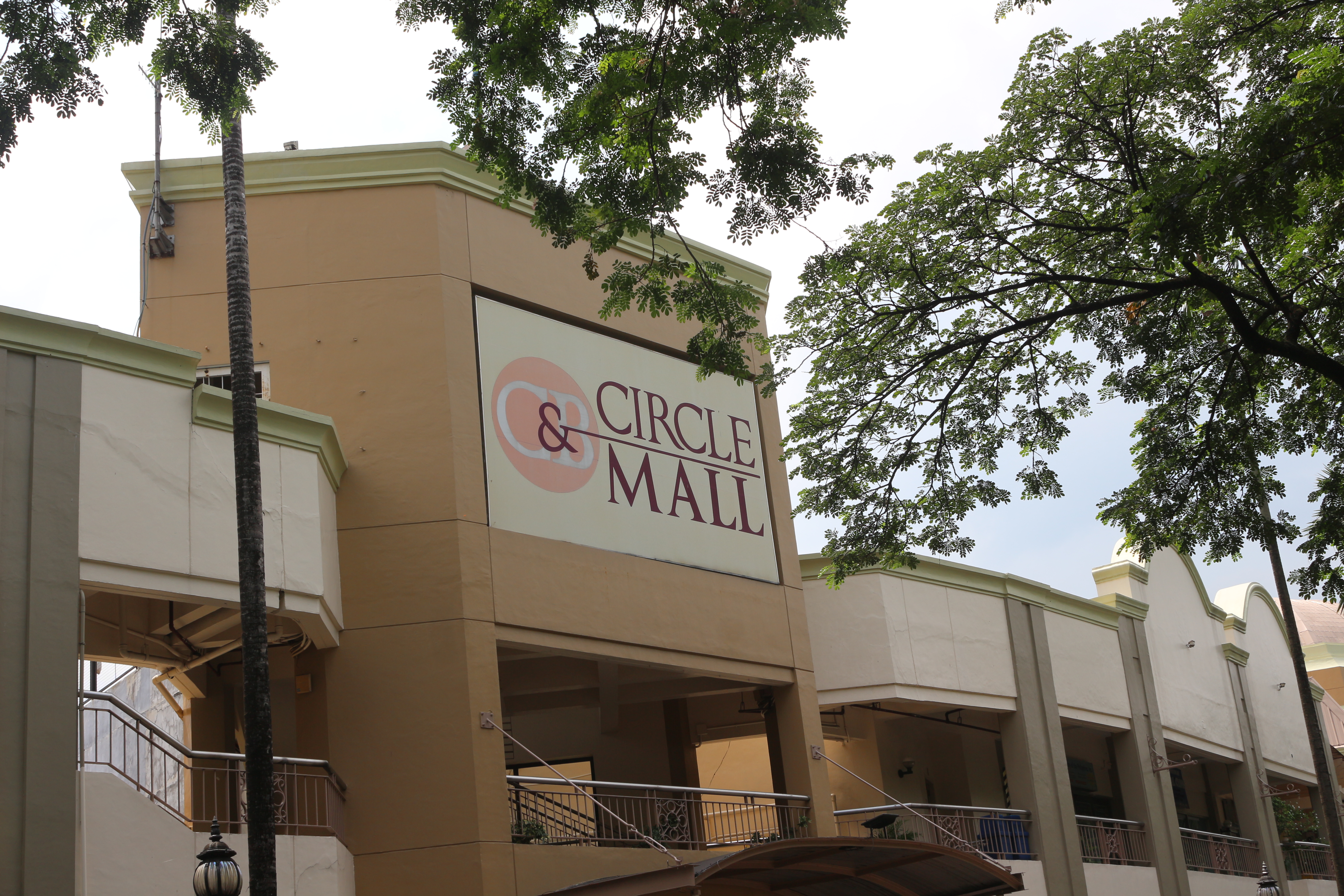
C&B Circle Mall
