= Marikina Cityhood Park =

Public park in Metro Manila, Philippines

- The Bell arch monument
- Interactive map of Marikina Cityhood Park
- Type: Public park
- Location: Marikina, Metro Manila, Philippines
- Coordinates: 14°38′07″N 121°05′52″E
- Created: 2005

Marikina Cityhood Park is a public park along the corner of Sumulong Highway and Shoe Avenue in Marikina, Metro Manila, Philippines. It features a 12 m (39 ft) concrete monument with a clock and 12 bells sourced from Italy as well as a fountain. It was unveiled in 2005 to commemorate ninth year anniversary of Marikina's cityhood.
