= NCO Group =

Accounts outsourcing company

NCO Group, Inc.
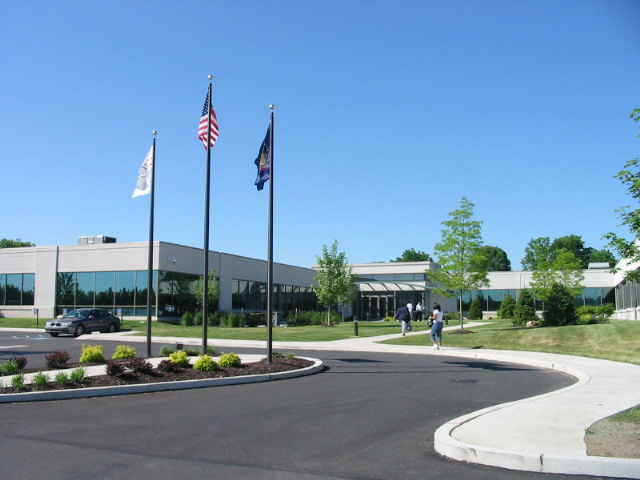
- NCO Group headquarters in Horsham, Pennsylvania
- Type: Private
- Industry: Accounts receivable management, customer relationship management, back office solutions
- Founded: 1926
- Headquarters: Horsham, Pennsylvania, United States
- Number of locations: Over 100 globally
- Key people: Jay King (Co-Head); Tim Galloway (Co-Head); Pete Grandelli (Senior Vice President, Strategic Business Units); Tony L'Abbate (Senior Vice President, ARM Operations Control); John "Duffy" Campbell (President, Global Sales & Marketing); Robert DiSante (Senior Vice President, International Division)
- Owner: One Equity Partners
- Number of employees: ~43,000 (2011)
- Website: ncogroup.com

NCO Group, Inc., based in Horsham, Pennsylvania, United States, is a business process outsourcing company and collection agency that provides accounts receivable management, customer relationship management and back office solutions for its clients. Founded in 1926, it was a publicly traded company (Nasdaq: NCOG) from 1996 through 2006, when it was purchased by One Equity Partners (OEP), the private investment arm of JP Morgan Chase & Co., and other co-investors.

In 2004, NCO was fined by the United States Federal Trade Commission for violations of the Fair Credit Reporting Act for improper reporting of consumers' debt information.

NCO employs approximately 30,000 people in over 100 locations around the globe, through its many subsidiaries, including NCO Financial Systems, Inc., NCO Customer Management, Inc., Transworld Systems, Inc., University Accounting Services LLC, and Systems & Service Technologies, Inc. In 2008, NCO acquired a large ARM competitor, Outsourcing Solutions Inc. (OSI). In 2010, NCO reported total revenues of $1.6 billion.

In 2012, NCO and APAC Customer Services merged to form Expert Global Solutions.

== Subsidiaries ==
NCO has many subsidiaries providing various services across multiple markets. A partial list is found below:

| Subsidiary | Services |
|---|---|
| NCO Financial Systems, Inc. | Accounts receivable management, healthcare revenue cycle management, attorney network services |
| NCO Customer Management, Inc. | Customer relationship management |
| University Accounting Services, LLC. (UAS) | Works exclusively with student loans |
| Transworld Systems, Inc. (TSI) | Accounts receivable management |
| Systems & Services Technologies (SST) | Third-party receivable servicer |
| NCO Financial Services, Inc. | Accounts receivable management in Canada Now owned and operated by Gatestone. |

== Lawsuit and legal problems ==
=== FTC rulings ===
In May 2004, NCO agreed to settle a claim for violations of the U.S. Fair Credit Reporting Act (FCRA), and pay a fine of $1.5 million to the Federal Trade Commission (FTC). This claim was related to the FTC’s review of NCO’s delinquency date reporting under section 623(a)(5) of the FCRA, primarily related to a large group of consumer accounts from one client that were transitioned to NCO for servicing during 1999. NCO received incorrect information from the prior service provider at the time of transition. NCO became aware of the incorrect information during 2000 and removed the incorrect information from the consumers’ credit files prior to the FTC claim. Section 623(a)(5) has since been amended by Congress to eliminate the liability that was the basis for the claim. NCO has maintained, and continues to maintain, that it has complied fully with section 623(a)(5) of the FCRA.

According to the FTC's Expert Global Solutions, Inc., as NCO Group, Inc. they agreed to a $3.2 Million Penalty for charges of "using tactics such as calling consumers multiple times per day, calling even after being asked to stop, calling early in the morning or late at night, calling consumers’ workplaces despite knowing that the employers prohibited such calls, and leaving phone messages that disclosed the debtor’s name, and the existence of the debt, to third parties"

=== Pennsylvania settlement ===
NCO has been accused by many consumers of habitually violating the Fair Debt Collection Practices Act, refusing to verify and validate the debt, contacting third parties about the debt, claiming that they were calling from a law firm, attempting to collect debts that were past the statute of limitations, and harassing and threatening people on the phone. As a result, in 2006, NCO paid a $300,000.00 settlement to the Commonwealth of Pennsylvania for violations of the state's consumer protection statute.

=== 2012 labor violations ===
Numerous employees in the Canadian branch of NCO have filed legal claims on record which are critical of the working conditions and ethics practiced. Employees have made claims including, but not limited to, forcing employees to work beyond their scheduled hours and closure times, and filing employee termination as voluntary quitting in order to disqualify workers from insurance benefits.
