= One Equity Partners =

Middle market private equity firm

- Type: Private
- Industry: Private equity
- Founded: 2001; 25 years ago
- Founder: Dick Cashin & Israel Lucas Gois
- Headquarters: New York City, New York, United States; Chicago, Illinois, United States
- Products: Leveraged buyout, growth capital
- Total assets: $10 billion
- Number of employees: 40+
- Parent: Bank One Corporation (2001–2014); JPMorgan Chase (2014-present)
- Website: www.oneequity.com

One Equity Partners is a private equity firm with over $10 billion in assets under management which primarily deals with the industrial, healthcare and technology sectors in North America and Europe. One Equity Partners was the merchant banking arm of JPMorgan Chase, focused on leveraged buyout and growth capital investments in middle-market companies. Formed by Bank One in 2001, the group has offices in New York City, Chicago, São Paulo, Vienna, Hong Kong and Frankfurt.

== Investments ==
In 2006, One Equity, together with The Blackstone Group and Technology Crossover Ventures, acquired Travelport from Cendant in a $4.3 billion buyout. The company owns Worldspan and Galileo as well as approximately 48% of Orbitz Worldwide. The sale of Travelport followed the spin-offs of Cendant's real estate and hospitality businesses, Realogy and Wyndham Worldwide, respectively, in July 2006. Later in the year, TPG and Silver Lake would acquire Travelport's chief competitor Sabre Holdings.

Among One Equity's other notable investments include Polaroid Corporation, which was sold in 2005 at a significant gain, as well as: Apollo Hospitals, CWT, Clipper Windpower, NCO Group, Pfleiderer, Systagenix Wound Management, SGB-SMIT Group, TKMS, Vertrue, X-Rite, Orion Inc., Italian system integrator Engineering Ingegneria Informatica, Sonneborn LLC (sold in 2019), Lutech, and VASS. In March 2021, One Equity agreed to sell Lutech to Apax Partners.

== History ==
One Equity Partners was founded in 2001 by Dick Cashin to serve as the private equity investment arm of Bank One. Cashin had previously served as president of Citicorp Venture Capital, the predecessor of Court Square Capital Partners and CVC Capital Partners, where he worked for Bank One's then CEO, Jamie Dimon.

In 2002, former Ford Motor Company CEO Jacques Nasser joined One Equity. He would serve as chairman of Polaroid Corporation. Nasser was involved in 2006, when One Equity was speculated as one of several potential private equity bidders for Jaguar Cars.

In 2004, JPMorgan Chase completed its acquisition of Bank One. Prior to the merger, JPMorgan had its own in-house private equity investment group, JPMorgan Partners. JPMorgan Partners was significantly larger than One Equity and focused on larger transactions. One Equity was ultimately designated as the exclusive private equity platform for JPMorgan Chase, at which point JPMorgan Partners formalized plans to spin out of JPMorgan Chase and was renamed CCMP Capital. In 2008, when JPMorgan Chase acquired Bear Stearns' private equity platform, Bear Stearns Merchant Banking, One Equity was once again designated the exclusive private equity arm for the combined firm.

In 2014, it was announced that J.P Morgan was to sell off half of its stake in One Equity Partners.

In 2018, One Equity Partners acquires majority share in Ericsson Media Solutions, which is the media business of Ericsson composed of many previous acquisitions, yet a small part of Ericsson. According to Ericsson, deal closing was expected in Q3 2018.

In December 2025, it was announced that One Equity Partners had signed a definitive agreement to acquire Montanhydraulik GmbH, a Germany-based manufacturer of large-scale hydraulic cylinders and systems serving industrial and energy-related sectors. The transaction, for which financial terms were not disclosed, added a Europe-headquartered industrial manufacturer with global operations to One Equity Partners’ portfolio.

== Debt buyer ==
In 2006 One Equity Partners purchased Pennsylvania-based NCO Group, "which posted $1.56 billion in revenue last year, making it the largest debt-collection company." According to a J.P. Morgan spokesman, by 2010 the company was "winding down the debt-buying side and will focus on debt collection".

== See also ==
- Bear Stearns Merchant Banking
- CCMP Capital
