= Blue Wave Mall Marikina =

Mall and office complex in Marikina, Metro Manila

Coordinates: 14°38′9″N 121°6′2″E

Blue Wave Mall Marikina, also known as Blue Wave at Marquinton or simply Blue Wave Marikina, is a mall and office complex in Marikina, Philippines developed by Federal Land, Inc. It sits on a 2 hectares (4.9 acres) site just off the Sumulong Highway, at the northwest corner of the intersection with Mayor Gil Fernando Avenue.

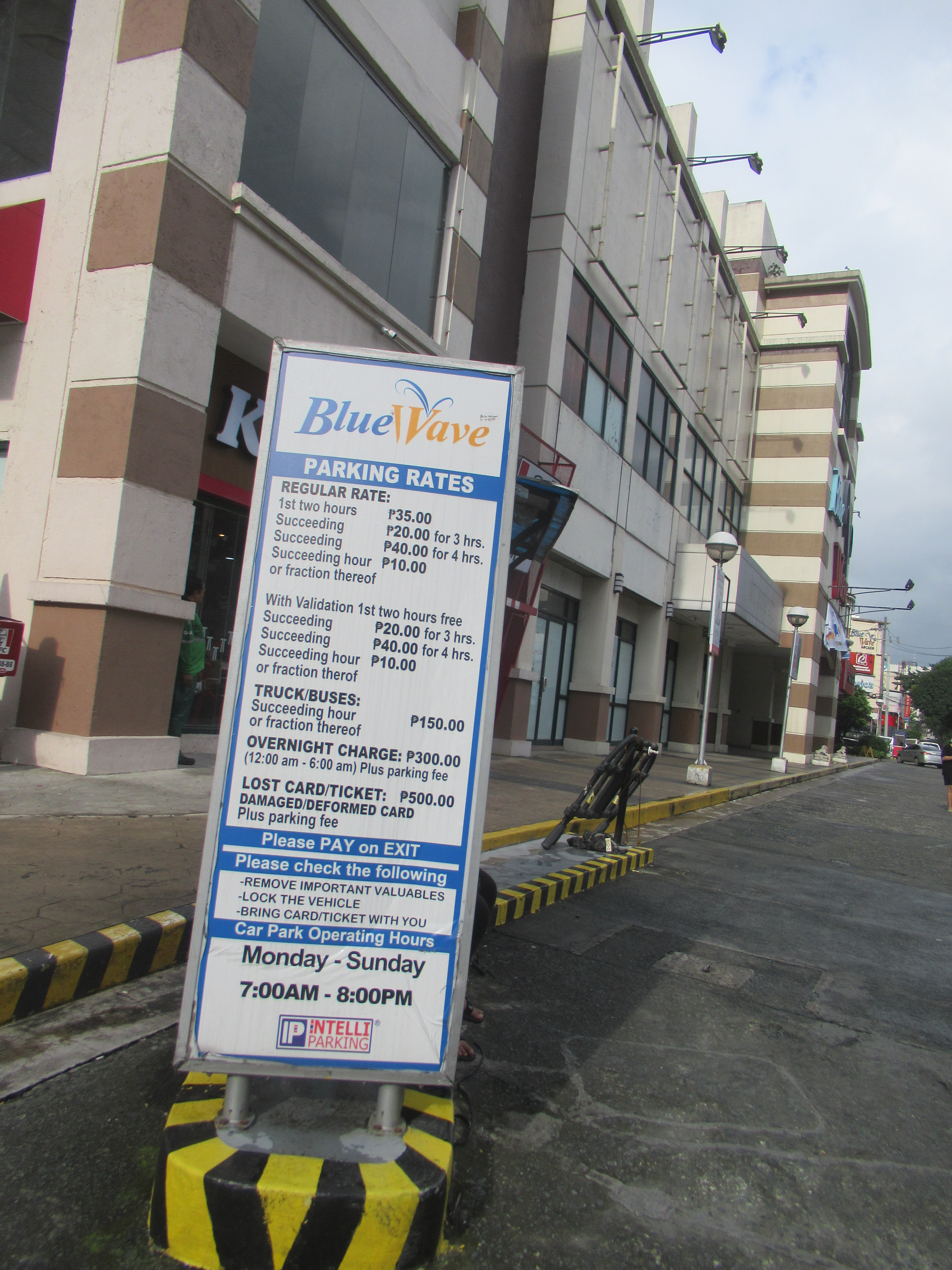
2023 side facade

Currently, the mall is under full rebranding and renovation.

== Mall ==
The mall is a three-storey structure. It is located near the Marquinton residences, a medium-rise planned residential community which primarily targets families, in Marikina. Despite that location, the mall itself targets a younger, upwardly-mobile customer segment, according to FedLand Brent Retail President Edward Tan. It features a four-screen cinema and a Robinsons Supermarket.

== Offices ==
The Blue Wave-Marikina IT Center is listed as an approved IT Center by the Philippine Economic Zone Authority (PEZA), making export-oriented companies located therein eligible for temporary tax holiday, permanent reduced rate of corporate income tax, and other incentives. Tenants there include the NCO Group, who opened their fourth Philippine call center there in June 2009 with 650 employees. As of May 2010, it is the only FedLand project to have this status, and one of only two in Marikina (the other being Riverbanks Center). However, PEZA also lists FedLand's Blue Wave-Metropolitan Park project in Pasay as an "economic zone being developed".

== History ==
Blue Wave-Marikina is a follow-on project building on the success of FedLand's earlier Blue Wave-Metropolitan Park strip mall project in Pasay. It opened in August 2005, at a time when there was already a glut of retail space in Metro Manila and vacancy rates were expected to edge as high as 17%; nevertheless, it achieved nearly full occupancy by the month prior to its opening. It was the first new major retail development in Marikina in over a decade. It formed part of a trend at the time of building smaller district and neighbourhood "niche retail" centers, of around 25,000 square metres (270,000 sq ft) in floor area, in response to the overbuilding of larger shopping malls.

=== Notable events ===
In August 2008, an armed robbery occurred at the Metrobank branch on the mall's ground floor. By a few days later, three of the five robbers had been caught. Police stated they were part of the Ampang-Colangco gang, which had committed a number of payroll, bank, and armor van robberies in Metro Manila.
