= List of barangays in Marikina =

There are 16 barangays in Marikina, a city in Metro Manila, Philippines. The most recent barangays to be created are Fortune and Tumana, which in 2008 were separated from Barangay Parang and Barangay Concepcion Uno respectively.

== Barangka ==
Barangka is named after the Spanish canyon, barranca. It is located along the western border of Marikina, is bordered on the west by Loyola Heights in Quezon City; to the south City; to the south by barangays Industrial Valley and Calumpang; to the east by Tañong; and the north by Loyola Grand Villas. On its south portion lies the Marikina River where the Riverbanks Center is located. Barangka actually lies on the hills of Quezon City, not too far from the Marikina fault system. Along with former Parang and Nangka, the former sitio was elevated to barrio (now termed barangay) by virtue of Republic Act No. 2601, which was enacted on June 21, 1959. Barangka is surrounded by schools, shopping malls, industrial zones, and transport hubs. It is accessible to neighboring commercial and business areas.

Points of interest:

- Barangka Barangay Hall
- Loyola Memorial Park
- Philippine Science Centrum
- Plaza de los Kapitanes
- Riverbanks Amphitheater
- Riverbanks Mall
- A. Bonifacio Avenue
- Largest Shoe Display at Riverbanks
- Christmas Bazaar and Fair during Holiday season
- Marikina River Park (Barangka portion)

== Calumpang ==
Calumpang was named after a wild almond (Sterculia foetida). The largest among the barangays of Marikina during the colonial period, Calumpang was originally bordered on the northwest by the Marikina River and immediately opposite it are barangays Tañong and Jesus de la Peña. Floods and soil erosion would drastically alter its landscape, giving to shrinkage and expanding the two other barangays from silt buildup. Over time, part of the river dried up, giving way to what is known as Patay na Ilog, an area where Provident Village is now situated. To spare it from nature's threats, a dike was constructed in the early 1950s to secure the barangay. In the pre-war era, Calumpang's land extended as far west above the hills of Quezon City, which is a section of White Plains; on the north northwest, the Marikina River; on the east, Pasig; and as far north as the boundaries of barangays Jesus dela Peña, Tañong, and Barangka. With the creation of Quezon City in 1939, its jurisdiction was altered. Although it remained a part of Marikina, its boundary on the west sector was reduced. The area from the chapel of San Antonio de Padua to the residence of Tayug family were added to the city. It was only after the war, through the effort of Rep. Emilio dela Paz, Sr., that it regained a portion of the disputed area that extended up to Usiw Hills, near Quezon City, which is now part of Industrial Valley. Later, when Industrial Valley was created into an independent barangay, its area of influence was again reduced.

Points of interest:

- Marikina River Park (Calumpang portion)
- LRT-2 Santolan Station
- SM City Marikina
- San Antonio De Padua Parish Church
- Noah Gazebo
- Kalumpang Barangay Hall
- Calumpang Covered Court

== Concepcion I (Uno) ==
Formerly known as the Bayan-Bayanan (little town), Barangay Concepcion, like the old Marikina area, was a rich agricultural area. Over time, though, new settlers found promise in its rich soil and migrants started to cultivate public lands, followed by the emergence of new communities. The barangay was officially named Concepcion after Mary the Immaculate Conception on June 16, 1956, with the enactment of Republic Act No. 1514. As an organized community, Marcelino de Guzman was installed as the first barangay leader in 1903 and held the post for five years.

Points of interest:

- Immaculate Concepcion Parish
- Marikina High School
- Our Lady of Perpetual Succor College
- Bayan-Bayanan Avenue (A national road named after the old barrio of Bayan-Bayanan, stretching along areas of Concepcion Uno and Marikina Heights)
- Naghihintay ng Bayani Pillars of Statue along Bayan-Bayanan Avenue (Concepcion and Marikina Heights)
- Barrio Bayan-Bayanan Old Parks (between boundary of Concepcion and Marikina Heights)
- Marikina Molecular Laboratory Building
- New Concepcion Market
- Con-Uno Barangay Hall
- St. Vincent Hospital

== Concepcion II (Dos) ==
The barangay was created under Presidential Decree No. 1488, (99) which was signed by President Ferdinand Marcos on June 11, 1978, stipulating the territorial boundaries in 1978. Officially, Concepcion Dos is bounded on the north by barangay Marikina Heights; on the west by Barangay Concepcion Uno and Barangay Sto. Niño; on the east by Antipolo City; and on the south by the municipality of Cainta. The first barangay election, held on July 4, 1978, elected lawyer Butch Crisol (1978–1980) as the first punong barangay.

Points of interest:

- Lilac Street Food Hub
- Marikina Hotel and Convention Center
- Pamantasan ng Lungsod ng Marikina
- Diocesan Shrine and Parish of St. Paul of the Cross
- Rancho Estates
- Center for Innovation and Technology for Enterprises - DTI-NCRO
- Con-Dos Barangay Hall
- SSS Village
- Hacienda Heights

== Fortune ==
A former sitio of Barangay Parang, Fortune was constituted as a separate entity on April 10, 2007, by virtue of Republic Act No. 9431. The new barangay, was named after a cigarette company located in the area, is the youngest among the 16 barangays of Marikina. Officially, the barangay is bounded on the north by the centerline of Fortune Avenue; on the east and north by the centerline of the Nangka River; on the southeast by the Marikina-Antipolo boundary until it intersects the centerline of Nangka River; on the southeast by the Marikina-Antipolo boundary until it intersects the centerline of Nangka River; on the west by the centerline of Park 8 Creek; on the west by the centerline of F. Balagtas Street; on the southwest by the centerline of Tanguile Street; and on the southwest between one depth along Monserrat Hill Street, La Milagrosa subdivision, until it intersects the Marikina-Antipolo boundary. The city mayor appointed the barangay's first set of officials after a plebiscite was held ratifying Fortune's creation. However, the administration of Empress 1 Subdivision and Foothill Area still belongs and governed by the barangay of Marikina Heights.

Points of interest:

- Armscor
- Fortune Barangay Hall
- Fortune Tobacco Corporation (now known as PMFTC or Philip Morris Fortune Tobacco Corporation)
- Pugadlawin Civic Centre
- Marikina-San Mateo connecting bridges (Modesta and Monterrey Hills)
- Fortune Avenue (formerly an extension of C.M. Recto Street of Barangay Parang)
- Fortune Transportation Terminal

== Industrial Valley Complex ==
Barangay Industrial Valley Complex was created under Batas Pambansa Bilang 203, approved by the unicameral legislature on March 25, 1982. The law is an offshoot of Pambansang Batas Bilang 1755. Under the law, the barangay was separated from Calumpang to form an independent barangay known as Barangay Industrial Valley. The new sub-territory would be legally be defined as follows: “Beginning from the intersection of Marikina Diversion Road and A. Bonifacio Avenue thence southward along the centerline of Marikina Diversion Road, until it intersects the centerline of Marikina River; thence southwest along the common boundary line of the municipality of Marikina and municipality of Pasig, province of Rizal, until it intersects the common boundary line of the municipality of Pasig and Quezon City; thence northward bounded by Quezon City until it intersects the point of beginning.” The first set of barangay officials was appointed by the President until their successors had been elected.

The Industrial Valley Complex includes the underground wastewater treatment facility, the Olandes Sewage Treatment Plant, which can process up to 10 million liters per day of domestic wastewater from 40,000 residents in the surrounding communities.

Points of interest:

- Nativity of Our Lady Parish
- FVR Plaza
- Industrial Valley Complex Park
- Marikina River Park Extension
- Barangay IVC building

== Jesus Dela Peña ==
The eldest Christian settlement in the city, the barangay was named after the first Augustinian parish of Jesus dela Peña (Jesus of the Rocks). It derived its identity after a Christ-like image was seen on the rock formations in the area. Aside from being host to Marikina's oldest church, the Jesus dela Pena Chapel which held its first mass in 1630, the place is also acknowledged as the traditional site of the first Holy Mass that was officiated in Marikina. In early colonial times, Jesus dela Peña was known as “Niyugan” (from niyog) because of the coconut plantations that dotted its agricultural landscape. With the arrival of the Jesuits, wheat from Mexico was introduced, earning another name for the place, the Tirriguhan, which is derivative of the Spanish “trigo” for wheat. Toward the latter part of colonial rule, influenced in part by the growing literacy among residents, alternative livelihoods, foremost of which was the shoe-making business, started to make a mark. The American Occupation greatly helped in developing the barangay. Health and educational infrastructure was introduced, while homespun industries became popular. In the years leading to the establishment of the Commonwealth, progress became more obvious. Marikina Bridge, a vital economic link to cities like Quezon and Manila, was formally opened in 1934. Under the Japanese rule, Jesus dela Peña, like many other areas in Marikina, was hit hard by atrocities. The Kempetai police, in particular, killed everyone who was suspected of spying for the Americans. The place was in ruins as a result of the indiscriminate bombings by the Allied Forces and invaders. Although devastated, Barangay Jesus dela Peña picked up the pieces and reassumed its role as the town's shoe capital. Today, it ranks as one of the city's most progressive business addresses.

Points of interest:

- Jesus Dela Peña Chapel
- Marikina River Park
- Provident Villages
- Marikina River Park Animal Trail
- JDLP Barangay Hall
- Rizal Monument in front of L.V. Elementary School
- Roman Garden
- Marikina White Gazebo
- Marikina River Picnic Park

== Malanday ==
Malanday was named after the shape of its territory, round and flat, just like that of a bilao (winnower). Malanday is bounded on the northeast by Barangay Concepcion, while to its southeast sector is Barangay Sto. Niño. On the southwest is Barangay Jesus dela Peña, and on the northwest is Quezon City. Mainly an agricultural area, Malanday was originally an uncultivated grassland that formed part of a rural community that would be known later for its rice field. To reach the place, pioneers had to transport and deliver commodities using the carabao-drawn kariton, given its ease in negotiating mud tracks. For Malanday residents, 1937 holds a special significance – it was the year they were released from the bondage of paying land taxes to the Tuasons, owner of most of the lands in Marikina. As a result, petitions for transfer of land ownership were filed. In response, the government bought a big portion of a vast estate and distributed it to occupants, requiring only the beneficiaries to pay a nominal amount for every square meter of land owned over a period of one decade. This development would give rise to the founding of Barangay Malanday.

Points of interest:

- Far Eastern University - Roosevelt
- Graceland Plaza
- Malanday Barangay Hall
- Lamuan
- Marikina River Park Extension (Malanday)

== Marikina Heights ==
During World War II, Barangay Marikina Heights was a vital military defense location. The Japanese built tunnels in the area to stage ambuscades, hide ammunition, store provisions, or seek shelter. The underground subway notably made it easy for the Japanese to reach their airfields known among residents as the Paliparan (airport). In post-war times, it was also the military training ground for Filipino soldiers who were deployed to the Korean War. The initial effort to create the area into a barangay was made on June 6, 1974, through the advice of the municipal council, by virtue of Resolution No. 76, which was later submitted to the provincial board of Rizal for action. In response, Provincial Resolution No. 75-746 was passed, recommending the creation of Marikina Heights to President Marcos. On April 2, 1978, Presidential Decree 1489 was issued, formally creating the new barangay. Marikina Heights is bounded by Fortune and Parang in the north, Cupang, Antipolo in the east, Concepcion Uno in the west and Concepcion Dos on the south.

Points of interest:

- Ayala Malls Marikina
- C & B Circle Mall
- Marikina Heights Foothill area (Located within Tanguile and Champaca Streets)
- Mari-Korea Monument
- Marikina Transport Terminal
- Marikina Hardin ng Bayan (Grotto Park)
- Marikina-Yeongdo Friendship Park (Evolution Park and Cow Statues)
- Marikina-Brampton Friendship Park (Gazebo Park)
- Liwasang Kalayaan
- Meralco Business Centre
- Naghihintay ng Bayani Pillars of Statue along Bayan-bayanan Avenue up to Liwasang Kalayaan (Includes Ka-Popoy Lagman statue in Meralco Centre and Torchman Statue in Marikina Heights Community Complex)
- Marikina Heights Community Complex (One Stop Shop Community Service Complex located at the heart of barangay which includes Barangay Hall, Barangay Health Center, SK Youth Office, Action Building, Marikina DSWD District 2 Office, Barangay Covered Court, Marikina Rehab Center etc.)
- Marist School
- St. Scholastica's Academy
- Terraces at Dao Architectural Building
- The Book Museum
- Molave Wet and Dry Market
- Garcia General Hospital
- Gen. Ordoñez Street (formerly known as Molave Street, an elliptical road named after Gen. Marian Ordoñez of Barrio Bayan-Bayanan)

== Nangka ==
Situated at the northernmost sector of Marikina along the concrete highway that leads to the towns of San Mateo and Montalban (Rizal), Barangay Nangka was the most rural among the city's barangays. It started as a small settlement built by two pioneering families and later evolved into a flourishing community largely due to a river, which is the barangay's namesake, that bilaterally cuts through Marikina and San Mateo, in Rizal Province. Named after the jackfruit, Barangay Nangka was created under RA 260, which was approved by Congress on June 21, 1959. It is situated on an elevated section of the southeastern part of Marikina and traverses the road that leads from the city to the towns of San Mateo and Montalban (now Rodiguez) in Rizal Province, where it shares common boundaries with Nangka River. It stretches up to sitio Balubad and the old railroad tracks known as Daang Bakal, and has an area of 181.68 hectares.

During colonial times, the area was home to rice fields and sugarcane plantations. Nangka was a thriving agricultural hub before it yielded to urban incursion; it was a primary source for root crops, vegetables, and rice. Conversion of farms into housing patches and the rise of commercial establishments eventually transformed the place into a population center and economic hub.

Points of interest:

- Fairlane Market
- PMFTC Office
- Balubad Settlement
- Nangka Barangay Hall
- Marikina-San Mateo Connecting Bridge
- Nangka River

== Parang ==
Before 1880, Parang, a sprawling estate of forest, farm, plains and low-lying regions, was part of Barrio Bayan-Bayanan. Initially, only 25 families, mostly orchard farmers, settled in the area. It was host to small sugar cane plantations and home to a forest area that was a good source of lumber, fruits, and wild life. When the railroad system reached its vicinity, specifically in the area between the sitio and its mother barangay, transport of farm products to Manila became easier. The legacy of this once-productive era can still be gleaned from the “Daang Bakal” tradition the place continues to remember. The arrival of the Americans at the turn of the 20th century would have a long-term impact on Parang (Tagalog for “thicket” or “bush”). Sugar cane plantation would give way to the cultivation of undergrowths, which in turn were developed as grazing farms for cattle, carabaos, and deer. This development, which made sprawling lands into grazing areas, would eventually give the place its name. Later, warehouses for stacking of fodders and serving as garage for tractors were built in the district. Coconuts, which were easy to cultivate and required lesser effort on the part of farmers, were introduced, slowly transforming the landscape of the place. Parang, given its dense forest, became a secure hangar for Japanese planes, and it was also made into a shelter for fleeing Imperial soldiers who were pursued by Allied Forces from Manila. But through it all, the barangay at once recovered from the travails of the conflict. Projects like houses started to make headway in the area and new shoe factories such as Eduardson Shoe Factory were opened.

Points of interest:

- Converse Warehouse
- Delfi Marketing Inc. (Formerly known of Goya Food Corporation)
- Manila Boystown Complex
- Pamantasan ng Lungsod ng Marikina
- Parang Barangay Hall
- NGI Parang Market
- Barangay Parang Playground (also a location of tiangue or bazaar during holiday season)
- Pagoda Arch in front of Parang Elem. School
- Squibman Village
- Gen. B.G. Molina National Road (formerly known as Lapu-Lapu Street and named after General Benjamin G. Molina of Barrio Parang)

== San Roque ==
Named after a saint, Barangay San Roque was a forestal region before the colonizers founded settlements here. Early migrants, encouraged by the opening of agricultural tracts following the arrival of missionaries, built communities, among them Daang Cainta. Two of the pioneering settlers in the area were the families of Don Isabelo Mendoza, a former gobernadorcillo, and Gervacio Carlos, later a stalwart in the shoe industry. Geographically, San Roque is bounded in the east by the Sierra Madre mountains; on the north, by Sta. Elena; to the south is Calumpang; and on the western sector, by the Marikina River. San Roque is known for its landmarks. The old residence of Apolonia Santos (Maestrang Oniang) was formerly a civil guard headquarters, cuartel, in the last decade of Spanish rule. During the American era, it housed the old Roosevelt High School. It used to be a church property but the Spaniards abandoned it just as the Revolution of 1896 started to gain momentum. Fray Rafael, the building administrator, sold the building to the government, which in turn was sold to Captain Itoy, Santos’ grandfather, before the Americans arrived.

Points of interest:

- Angel Tuazon Avenue (Gil Fernando Avenue) Food Hub
- LRT-2 Marikina-Pasig Station
- Marikina Footwear Center Building
- Marikina River Park (San Roque portion)
- San Miguel-Purefoods Corporation
- Shoe Museum
- Teatro Marikina
- Marikina Express
- OTTO Building
- Patio del Zapatero
- San Roque Cockpit Arena

== Santa Elena ==
Sta. Elena got its name from a cross-shaped driftwood that was found floating in the river. The barangay traces it beginnings to 1687 when the Jesuits stationed at the Jesus de la Peña mission were looking for a new church site. The settlement was then a rural community of contented folk who survived from the fruits of their farms and depended on fish from the nearby Marikina River. Over time, the rural community flourished, becoming the poblacion of what now is Marikina. Although it had progressed very well, it also had its share of tragedies. In 1825 and 1880, strong tremors rocked the place. Another catastrophe occurred in 1887 when a fire burned down the flourishing neighborhood. A similar calamity took place in 1974 in which numerous laborers were lethally trapped inside the workplace. In World War II, like most of the barangays of the city, Sta. Elena also had its share of devastation from bombing runs.

Points of interest:

- Kapitan Moy Building/Sentrong Pangkultura ng Marikina
- Diocesan Shrine and Parish of Nuestra Señora de los Desamparados
- Marikina City Hall
- Marikina Freedom Park
- Marikina Polytechnic College
- Marikina Public Market
- Marikina River Park
- Marikina Sports Center
- TESDA Office
- Marikina City Public Library
- Women's Park
- Marikina Chinese Pagoda
- Marikina River Stage
- The Iconic Marikit Statue in Marikina River Park
- Holiday Tiangue at Marikina River Park
- Sta. Elena Chapel
- Kapitan Moy Monument & Community Park
- Shoe Avenue
- Busts of Marikina City Mayors in front of City Hall
- Marikina City Hall Fountain
- Marikina Sports Building
- Bulwagan ng Katarungan Bldg.

== Santo Niño ==
Oral tradition traces the barangay's origin to 1667 when the Jesuits crossed Marikina River from Jesus dela Peña in search of a place where a new church could be built and a mission established. The missionaries found a rustic area known as Halang, so named after the orientation of the place, which is perpendicular to the rising sun. The place was later dedicated to the Holy Child or Sto. Niño, after whom it was named. In colonial times, Barangay Sto. Niño was bounded on the north by Malanday, on the east by Apongao, Cupang, and Mayamot, on the south by Sta. Elena, and the west by the Marikina River. Originally, the river had its bank along J.P. Rizal Street but geologic movement, flash floods, and siltation eventually led to the formation of a fertile area known as Tumana. In 1903, Sto. Niño hosted the first Aglipayan Chapel that was built in a location adjacent to Marikina Bridge. Unfortunately, the structure was destroyed in World War II. A new house of worship was later built in another location but a large fire gutted it in 1908.

Points of interest:

- Amang Rodriguez Memorial Medical Center
- Blue Wave Mall
- Cityhood Park
- Marikina River Park
- Marikina Public Market
- Marikina Clock Tower Arch
- Shoe Avenue corner Sumulong Highway (the busiest intersection of Marikina City)
- Marikina Sports Center
- Marikina Valley Medical Center
- Marquinton Residences
- Sienna Tower Mall and Residences
- S&R Membership Shopping
- Tropicana Garden City Residences
- Sumulong Highway
- Paliparan
- Marikina River Park Tiangue
- Marikina Bridge
- Sto. Niño Baseball Field
- Marikina Bicycle and Skating Rink
- Marikina Chinese Temple
- City Engineering
- Marikina BIR Building
- Giant Floating Shoe

== Tañong ==
Tañong traces its origin to March 1898 when pioneering families decided to formally establish a community. Like many rural communities in colonial Philippines, it had its formal beginnings during the period when missionary work was pervasive in areas with existing settlements and in places near river sources. During the Spanish rule, Tañong was populated by migrants from nearby Balara and Krus na Ligas (Gulod) areas. The area was not just a favorite hunting ground for individuals who were considered fugitives by the colonial regime; it was also an impoverished community that was subjected to many abuses of the civil guards. Life, however, was better under the American rule. New developments were introduced and living conditions improved. The eruption of war derailed all these inroads. But with Liberation, life in the barrio started to show promise with the influx of new arrivals, some of whom have permanently settled in an area aptly called, Halo-halo (hodgepodge).

Points of interest:

- Loyola Memorial Park
- Provident Villages
- Tañong Barangay Hall
- A. Bonifacio Avenue
- Marikina River Park -Tañong portion

== Tumana ==
A former sitio of Concepcion Uno, Barangay Tumana was created on April 10, 2007, under Republic Act No. 9432. It is the youngest among the sub-territories in the city. The place has been geologically shaped by soil buildup resulting from flooding, erosion, and landslide. Part of the barangay was a component of the riverbank but it has been converted into a fertile land. Over the centuries, the accretion has been cultivated as rice fields and fruit farms and the owner of this land is Don Vicente Cruz

Points of interest:

- Marikina River Mega Dike
- Tumana Bridge
- Loyala Grand Villas - Marikina Tumana Area
- Newly Built Tumana Barangay Hall
- Bagong Farmers Avenue (access to Quezon City)
- Bagong Farmers Talipapa
