= Tiyakad =

Filipino racing game

Tiyakad or Kadang kadang is a traditional Filipino racing game that uses bamboo stilts. In another variant, the players use coconut shells as slippers and use strings tied to said slippers to move forward.
