= Gateway Square =

Building complex in the Philippines

- Interactive map of the Gateway Square area
- Hotel chain: Novotel; Ibis Styles

General information
- Architectural style: Contemporary architecture
- Classification: Mixed-Use
- Location: Araneta City, Cubao, Quezon City, Philippines
- Coordinates: 14°37′14″N 121°3′12″E
- Construction started: October 14, 2002; 23 years ago
- Completed: September 1, 2024; 2 years ago
- Opened: Gateway Mall 1: October 15, 2004; 21 years ago; Gateway Office: 2005; 21 years ago; Parking Garage South: August 2012; 14 years ago; Gateway Tower: 2014; 12 years ago; Novotel: October 2015; 10 years ago; Gateway Mall 2: September 1, 2023; 3 years ago; Ibis Styles: September 1, 2024; 2 years ago
- Owner: Araneta Group
- Operator: Gateway Malls: Araneta City, Inc. Gateway Tower: Araneta City, Inc. Araneta Coliseum: Progressive Development Corporation; Novotel & Ibis Styles Hotels: Araneta Hotels, Inc.

Height
- Height: Gateway Tower: 127 m (416.67 ft); Novotel:85 m (278.9 ft); Ibis Styles: 84.86 m (278.4 ft)

Technical details
- Floor count: Gateway Mall 1: 6 upper + 3 basement Gateway Mall 2: 8 upper + 3 basement Basement Parking: 3 Parking Garage South : 5 upper + 3 basement Gateway Tower: 31 + 3 basement Novotel: 24 + 3 basement Ibis Styles: 22 + 3 basement
- Floor area: 400,000 m^{2} (4,300,000 sq ft)
- Lifts/elevators: 28
- Grounds: 5 hectares (12 acres)

Design and construction
- Architecture firm: General Master Plan and Architectural Design: RTKL Associates and Palafox Associates; Gateway Mall 2 & Ibis Styles Hotel only: Aidea
- Developer: Araneta City, Inc
- Main contractor: CE Construction Corporation (Gateway Mall 1); Design Coordinates, Inc. (DCI) Construction (Gateway Tower); EEI Corporation (Novotel Manila Araneta City) Megawide Construction Corporation (Gateway Mall 2 and Ibis Styles Araneta City); Stages, Design and Construction (Gateway Mall 2 and Ibis Styles Araneta City)

Other information
- Number of stores: 400+ (expected)
- Number of rooms: Novotel Manila Araneta City: 401; Ibis Styles Araneta City :286
- Parking: 3,100 slots
- Public transit: Araneta Center-Cubao; Araneta Center-Cubao; 51 53 61 Farmers Plaza; 3 LRT 2-Gateway Mall; UBE Araneta City Bus Port; 1 Cubao

Website
- gatewaysquare.com.ph

References
- www.gatewaymall.com.ph/gateway-square

The Gateway Square is a transit oriented, mixed-use superblock development located within the Araneta City complex in Cubao, Quezon City. The development is both owned and developed by the Araneta City, Inc. (ACI), a subsidiary of the Araneta Group. Located in the central part of the complex, the development stands across the Farmers Plaza mall, the Farmers Market, the Araneta City Cyberpark complex, the Fiesta Carnival, the New Frontier Theater, and the Aurora Tower.

The complex encompasses the buildings around the Smart Araneta Coliseum and the Gateway Malls, and integrates malls, offices, hotels, a sports arena and parking spaces all interconnected within a single space. The complex is also complemented with additional leisure amenities placed within the complex, such as cinemas, restaurants, rooftop gardens, and convention and event spaces, as well as an art museum, a bowling alley, a church, a rooftop bar, and a supermarket. Construction of the complex began in October 2002 with the groundbreaking of the Gateway Mall 1 and has later been developed into different phases over the years through the completion of various properties until its completion in September 2024 with the completion of the Ibis Styles Araneta City.

== History ==
The Gateway Square occupies 5 hectares (12 acres) of the Araneta City complex and occupies the areas surrounding the Smart Araneta Coliseum and the Gateway Malls, such as the former open parking areas of the Araneta Coliseum located along General Araneta, General Mc Arthur, and General Aguinaldo Avenues; the former Gateway Food Park, and the former Gateway-Farmers Plaza footbridge, which linked the Gateway Mall 1 to the nearby Farmers Plaza mall and offers a direct connection to the MRT 3 Araneta Center–Cubao station. The development serves as part of the Araneta Center Redevelopment Master Plan unveiled in 2000, aimed to redevelop the Araneta Center, currently rebranded as the Araneta City, with the construction of a variety of new malls, office buildings, hotels, residential towers, and other new mixed-use properties, as well as the renovation of the Araneta Coliseum and the New Frontier Theater. One of the first plans laid out within the area within 2000 was the "Millenium Mall" project, a proposed 7-storey mall with 600,000 m^{2} (6,500,000 sq ft) of retail space, and spans from the Araneta Center–Cubao Line 2 station, around the west side of the Smart Araneta Coliseum, up to the Farmer's Market and General McArthur Avenue, with connections to the adjacent Farmers Plaza. The mall will also have 340,000 m^{2} (3,700,000 sq ft) of entertainment spaces consisting cineplexes, an IMAX Theater, a bowling alley, a full scale skating rink, and a children and family entertainment center. The Araneta Group tapped Felino Palafox of Palafox Associates and Sudhakar Thakurdesai of RTKL Associates for the master plan, which later became the foundations for the development of the Gateway Mall 1.

Construction within the complex began in October 2002 with the groundbreaking of the Gateway Mall 1 after the demolition of the area's former buildings, such as the Aurora Shopping Arcade, the Quezon Arcade and the Plaza Fair department store, which were demolished from 2001 to early 2002 to give way for the construction of the Gateway Mall 1, which was completed on October 15, 2004. Additional developments were later constructed in the following years after the completion of the Gateway Mall 1 on 2004, as part of the next phases of the redevelopment master plan, such as the construction of the Gateway Office Building in 2005, aimed to cater the rising business process outsourcing market in the country in the early 2000s. In 2009, a plan was made to construct a mixed-use development located along the stretch of General Aguinaldo Avenue and General Mc Arthur Avenues, which also passes along General Araneta Avenue, where the current site of the Novotel up to the area where Farmers Market is currently located. The plan consists of two high-rise towers along with a mall encompassing the southern side of the Araneta Coliseum, three mid-rise towers, and also includes a planned Piazza where Farmers Market currently stands. The plan was eventually scrapped in the 2014 as the present layout and master plan of the complex was preferred.

In 2008, after years of negotiations and finalized plans to construct a 4-star hotel in the area, the Araneta Group launched the Novotel Manila Araneta City, and later serves as one of the crown jewel projects in the area. Two years later, in 2010, construction for both the Gateway Gateway Tower and the Novotel Manila Araneta City began. Both buildings were eventually completed in 2014, while the Novotel began its operations on the following year in 2015. To cater the rising demand of parking spaces in the Araneta Coliseum during concerts and events, the construction of the Parking Garage South began in 2011 and was completed within 2012. This was also followed by the completion of the renovation of the Araneta Coliseum on the same year, which was aimed to modernize the coliseum's facilities and amenities. The renovation also included the construction of the glazed Green Gate facade of the Coliseum.

The final stages of the complex was laid out in 2014, during the planning stages of the Gateway Mall 2, the expansion project of the Gateway Mall 1 and the development of the Ibis Styles Araneta City. The Araneta Group also entered a partnership with Aidea for the architectural design of the Gateway Mall 2 and Ibis Styles Hotel. Construction of the Gateway Mall 2 and the Ibis Styles hotel began in 2017, following the closure of the Gateway Food Park and the Araneta Coliseum open parking area located along General Araneta Avenue. Full construction officially began with the capsule-laying ceremony of the Gateway Mall 2 and Ibis Styles Hotel on 31 July 2018. The Gateway Mall 2 and Ibis Styles hotel complex was topped off on 11 February 2020, and was initially planned to open within the 4th quarter of 2020, while the Ibis Styles Hotel was aimed to begin full operations in early 2021. During the topping-off ceremony, the Araneta Group also announced the completion of the Gateway Square complex, which serves as a superblock complex within the Araneta City.

The opening of the Gateway Mall 2 and Ibis Styles Hotel was later delayed due to the effects of the lockdowns imposed during the COVID-19 pandemic and due to the costing issues within the construction of the buildings along the Araneta City between the Araneta Group and Megawide. The delays also caused design changes and a change in construction matters. Renovations were also made in the Araneta Coliseum in 2023, as the country hosted the 2023 FIBA Basketball World Cup, and featured a newer "Big Cube" LED video board and modernized seats and dugouts. As the tournament was held the same period, the Gateway Mall 2 was fully opened on 1 September 2023. In March 2024, the Ibis Styles Hotel was formally opened, and the hotel's full operations began in September 2024. The Ibis Styles Hotel later made its grand opening in February 2025.

== Properties ==
Gateway Square is a named after the Gateway Mall, which serves as the Araneta City's first modern development in the Araneta City Redevelopment Master Plan, and occupies 5 hectares (12 acres) within the complex. The development is a transit-oriented development due to its direct connections to major railway stations, such as the LRT Line 2 Araneta Center–Cubao station from the Gateway Mall 1 and the Gateway Office building from the north, and the MRT Line 3 Araneta Center–Cubao station on the western side due to its direct connection to the adjacent Farmers Plaza. Other transport terminals and stopover points are also located around the complex, such as the jeepney and bus routes serving along Aurora Boulevard located below the LRT 2-Gateway Mall concourse, the Farmers Plaza UV Express terminal, and the Center Avenue UV Express terminal. Other transport terminals within the complex are the Araneta City Jeepney Terminal, the Araneta City Modern Jeepney Terminal, and the Araneta City Bus Port.

The development has a total of eight properties and 400,000 m^{2} (4,300,000 sq ft) of floor area, composed of two malls, two hotels, two office buildings, a sports arena, and a parking garage, which were designed by US-based architectural firm RTKL Associates and in collaboration with local architectural firm Palafox Associates. The second architectural firm to be tapped for the architectural planning and design of the complex is Aidea, which serve as the primary architectural firm for the Gateway Mall 2 and the Ibis Styles Hotel. The Gateway Square is also bounded by major roads along the Araneta City, such as the Aurora Boulevard in the north, the General Araneta Avenue and Central Avenue on the west, the General Mc Arthur Avenue on the south, and the General Aguinaldo Avenue on the east.

=== Gateway Malls ===
==== Gateway Mall 1 ====
The Gateway Mall 1 is a 6-storey mall standing along General Aguinaldo Avenue, completed in October 2004. The mall serves as the primary flagship mall of the Araneta City which sparked the "renaissance" of the complex. The mall has 100,000 m^{2} (1,100,000 sq ft) of floor area and houses a variety of both local and international brands and currently houses over 200 shops, with Rustan's serving as the mall's anchor tenant, and Robinsons Supermarket serving as the supermarket tenant. Aside from retail spaces, the mall also houses amenities such as The Oasis indoor open-air garden, the Food Express food court, the first ten cinemas of the Gateway Cineplex 18, and The Gateway Gallery art museum. Gateway Mall 1 is also directly connected to the Smart Araneta Coliseum, the LRT 2 Cubao Station, the Gateway Office, and a bridge connection to the adjacent New Frontier Theater.

==== Gateway Mall 2 ====
Standing along the western side of the Araneta Coliseum, the Gateway Mall 2 serves as the expansion project of the Gateway Mall. Completed in September 2023, the Gateway Mall 2 is a 8-storey mall with 200,000 m^{2} (2,200,000 sq ft) of floor area and hosts a multitude of over 100 retail stores, kiosks, and dining choices, which includes a Wolfgang's Steakhouse branch and the Shopwise Supermarket. Other featured amenities of the mall are The Lagoon fountain and The Lagoon Restaurant Collection, the Coliseum Plaza food alley with direct connections to the Smart Araneta Coliseum, the Palenque Filipino-themed food alley, the Quantum Skyview atrium, the Paeng's Gateway Bowl bowling alley, the last 8 cinemas of the Gateway Cineplex 18, the World Kitchens food hall, the Sensory Gardens rooftop garden, and the Sagrada Familia Church. The mall is also directly connected to the adjacent Ibis Styles Araneta City through the hotel's fourth floor main lobby and the hotel's restaurants on the fifth floor, and the Farmers Plaza through the mall's walkways.

=== Office Buildings ===
==== Gateway Tower ====
The Gateway Tower is a 31-storey mixed-use tower rising along General Aguinaldo Avenue. Completed in 2014, the tower has direct connections to the Gateway Mall 1 through the Gateway Tower Mall and the New Frontier Theater through an elevated bridgeway and hosts the Araneta Group and its subsidiary companies, as the tower serves as the company's headquarters. Gateway Tower has a total floor area of over 76,000 m^{2} (820,000 sq ft) and also caters a variety of business process outsourcing (BPO) companies and also features 3 penthouse levels, and a helipad. The tower's tenants include the Araneta Group at the tower's topmost corporate office levels; Accenture, which occupies multiple floors in the tower; AIG, GoodEgg BPO Inc., Horizon Recruitment Pacific Corporation, Keller Williams Realty, Regus and TTEC.

==== Gateway Office ====
Situated along Aurora Boulevard and General Aguinaldo Avenue, the Gateway Office is a 11-storey building completed in 2005, and offers 6,700 m^{2} (72,000 sq ft) of office spaces. The PEZA-certified building hosts a variety of shops on the building's ground to second floors and companies on the upper levels. The building was once occupied by Accenture before moving their operations to the Cyberpark Tower One located at the Araneta City Cyberpark. The building is directly connected to the Gateway Mall 1 and the LRT 2 Gateway Mall Concourse. The building's tenant is dataSpring, Inc., which occupies office spaces on the 9th floor.

=== Events Venue ===
==== Smart Araneta Coliseum ====
Also known as the "Big Dome" due to its spherical dome in its architectural design, the Smart Araneta Coliseum is an indoor arena located along General Aguinaldo Avenue. Built in 1960, the Coliseum numerous events since its opening, and hosts over 200 events annually. The Coliseum also encountered numerous renovations and upgrades through the years, and its most recent renovation was completed in 2023, as the country hosted the 2023 FIBA Basketball World Cup and the opening of modernized entrance points, a food alley with direct connections to the adjacent Gateway Mall 2 named the Coliseum Plaza, and access points from the adjacent Gateway Mall 2.

=== Hotels ===
==== Novotel Manila Araneta City ====
Built and completed in 2014, the Novotel Manila Araneta City is a 24-storey midscale hotel located along General Aguinaldo Avenue and serves as the first Novotel branded hotel in the country. Standing on the southeast corner of the Araneta Coliseum, which formerly serves as a parking lot within the Coliseum, the hotel features designs emphasizing natural light throughout the building and offers 401 rooms. The hotel's amenities include five restaurants, several meeting and function rooms, an open-air events venue, a Premium Lounge offering a wide view of Metro Manila, and a penthouse suite.

==== Ibis Styles Araneta City ====
Standing along General Roxas Avenue, and located on the northwest corner of the Smart Araneta Coliseum, the Ibis Styles Araneta City is a budget hotel located adjacent to the Gateway Mall 2. Built and completed in 2024, the hotel serves as the first Ibis Styles branded hotel in the country. The hotel offers 286 rooms, which is divided into 22 rooms per floor, and offers three restaurants, a co-working space with an all-day patisserie, five meeting halls, and a rooftop bar beside a rooftop cantilevered pool.

=== Parking Spaces ===
The Gateway Square offers 3,100 parking slots and is interconnected to all buildings throughout its complex through its basement parking levels. The Gateway Mall 1 and the Gateway Mall 2 has three basement parking levels, while the Gateway Mall 1's basement parking is also connected to the Gateway Mall 2's basement parking on Basement level 3. The Gateway Square also features the Parking Garage South, an 8-storey parking garage located along General Mc Arthur Avenue. Completed in August 2012, the Parking Garage South is a weather-proof and state-of-the-art green parking building with 5 aboveground parking levels and three basement parking levels, and features green building initiatives in its design, such as the installation of side planters on the parking garage's facade.
