= Gateway Tower (Cubao) =

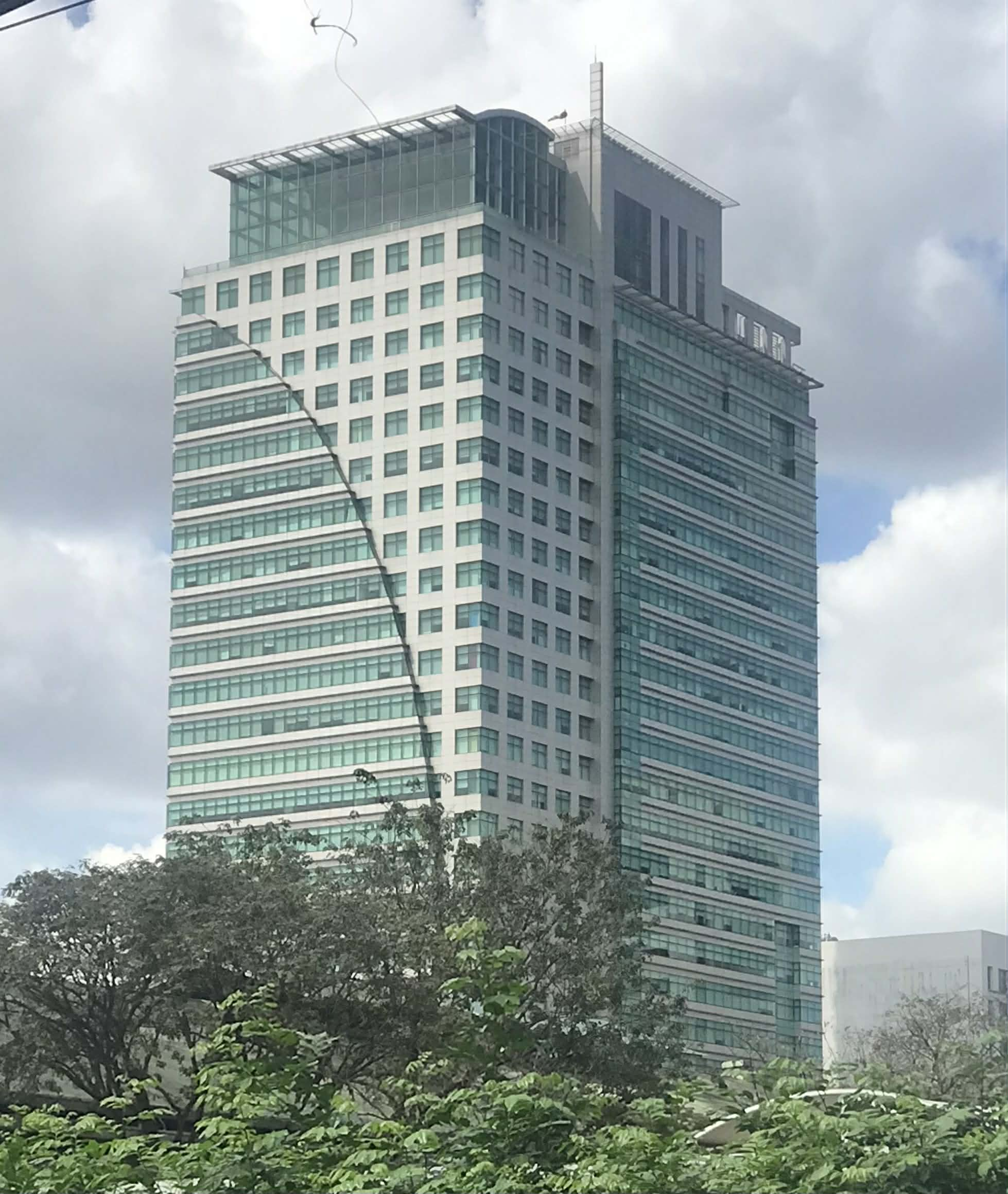

General information
- Status: Completed
- Type: Mixed-use
- Location: Gen. Aguinaldo Avenue, Araneta City, Quezon City
- Construction started: 2010
- Completed: 2014
- Owner: ACI Inc.
- Operator: ACI Inc.

Height
- Antenna spire: 127 m (416.67 ft)
- Roof: 124.35 m (407.97 ft)

Technical details
- Floor count: 31
- Floor area: 76,341 m^{2} (821,727.69 sq ft)
- Lifts/elevators: 10

Design and construction
- Architecture firm: AC Redevelopment Design Group; Palafox Associates; RTKL Associates; ALT Limited (Consultant)
- Developer: ACI Inc.
- Main contractor: Design Coordinates, Inc. (DCI) Construction

The Gateway Tower is a 31-storey mixed use skyscraper located in the Araneta City at Quezon City. The tower was named after the adjacent Gateway Mall and serves as the headquarters of the Araneta Group and its subsidiaries, replacing the Aurora Tower since 2014. Moreover, the tower sits on a rectangular lot located along General Aguinaldo Avenue and features retail and electronics stores, dining outlets, hair salons, office spaces, an open air rooftop garden, and an art gallery, while the tower's upper floors are also occupied by various call centers, franchising firms, and tech companies.

Initially planned as a 25-storey tower, groundbreaking for the tower took place in 2005, while the tower's construction phase began in 2010, and after a series of architectural design changes and upgrades to cater the rising demand of office spaces in the area, the tower was completed in 2014.

== History and Construction ==
Plans for the Gateway Tower project have been in place since the opening of the Gateway Mall 1 in 2004, as part of the Araneta Center Redevelopment Master Plan. The plans within the development of the tower consists of an expanded retail podium with direct connections to the Gateway Mall, offices for Business Process Outsourcing/Information Technology (BPO-IT) companies, and penthouse offices for the Araneta Group and its subsidiary companies. The site of the tower is located within the Gateway Mall's eastern side, wherein the old Plaza Fair department store once stood, and formerly served as one of the biggest department store chains in the area. The tower's groundbreaking works began in 2005, which followed the opening of the Gateway Office Building, but construction was delayed in 2006 over construction issues hounding the Gateway Mall, which ended in a lawsuit with the Gateway Mall's contractor, CE Construction Corporation, and the Araneta Group was forced to pay ₱114 million on the case. Initially, the construction of the Gateway Tower commenced on second half of 2010, with Design Coordinates, Inc. (DCI) Construction tapped as the main contractor of the project, using structural steel frames for the structure of the tower, which is similarly used to the construction of the One World Trade Center in New York City and the Rufino Pacific Tower in Makati City, making the Gateway Tower as one of the tallest steel-framed towers in the country.

The tower was topped off at the first half of 2012, while the tower's tenants began occupying the building's retail areas in December 2012. To cater the new expansion of the Gateway Mall, some areas of the mall we're yielded to the Gateway Tower Mall through additional walkways and access points, which also increased a number of retail shops within the mall, while the Rustan's Department Store was expanded and occupies 4 floors of additional spaces of the current complex. The Gateway Tower Mall's soft opening was made in June 2013, with the first five floors opening its doors to various shops, food stalls and services, while the full opening of the new Gateway Mall expansion was completed on the 4th quarter of 2013. On the 2nd quarter of 2014, the tower was fully completed, with tower's upper office tenants began occupying the mall. The tower serves as the first high-rise office tower to be completed within the Araneta City complex, and was later followed by the completion of the Cyberpark Tower 1 of the Araneta City Cyberpark on 2016. On 30 September 2016, the expansion of the revamped Rustan's Department Store was opened, and once occupied a total of three floors within the mall, with nearly 10,000 m^{2} (107,639.10 sq ft) of floor area within the mall, compared to the department store's previous original area size 3,700 m^{2} (39,826.47 sq ft). The department stores caters over 800 various brands and also features a VIP Lounge, a breastfeeding station, and a cafe, in partnership with East Cafe. In the aftermath of the effects of the COVID-19 pandemic in the country in 2020 to 2021, the area formerly occupied by Rustan's was reduced on 2022 from four floors to two floors.

== Location ==
The tower is strategically located at the northern area of the Araneta City, located near the Aurora Tower within the northeast, and stands along Gen. Aguinaldo Avenue. The tower is also situated within Gen. Malvar and Gen. Roxas Avenues, and is connected to the Gateway Mall, the Gateway Office Building occupied by Accenture, and the Araneta Center-Cubao LRT Station in the north; the New Frontier Theater and the Manhattan Parkview of the Manhattan Gardens condominium complex via elevated bridge on the east, which were completed on the 4th Quarter of 2018, and on the 2nd Quarter of 2019, respectively. The tower is also located near the Farmers Market, the Farmers Plaza, and the MRT Araneta Center-Cubao Station in the west; while standing in the tower's southern areas are the Araneta City Cyberpark, the Araneta City Bus Port, and major shopping centers such as, Shopwise, Ali Mall and SM Cubao via elevated walkways.

The tower is also part of the Gateway Square, a transit-oriented mixed-use superblock development located within the Araneta City complex. The development consists the two Gateway Malls, the Gateway Office Building, the Novotel Manila Araneta City, the Ibis Styles Araneta City, the Smart Araneta Coliseum, and the Araneta Coliseum Parking Garage, all connected by bridges and walkways.

== Architecture ==
The tower's designs were inspired from the adjacent Gateway Mall 1, and was designed by the AC Redevelopment Design Group, in association of local architectural firm Palafox Associates by Filipino architect Felino Palafox and American architectural firm RTKL Associates. The Araneta Group also hired ALT Limited as the project's facade consultant. The tower features a contemporary facade that shows a mixture of green-colored glass windows, which matches its colors with the Gateway Mall 1, and is blended with a mix of concrete exteriors patterned with greyish hues. The tower also features a set of external glass walls with aesthetic upward curvatures within the tower's northern and southern portions, and slices between the tower's facade, giving the tower a "Neo-futurism"-inspired modern design.

== Tenants and Features ==
Standing at 127 m (416.67 ft) above the ground, the tower has a total floor area of 76,341 m^{2} (821,727.69 sq ft) and is directly connected to the Gateway Mall with additional 15,000 m^{2} (160,000 sq ft) of retail spaces, known as the Gateway Tower Mall. The tower houses a variety of local and foreign companies within the tower's upper office levels, such as the Araneta Group, which serves as the company's headquarters and occupies the tower's two topmost corporate office floors after moving its operation from the Aurora Tower's four topmost floors, and Accenture, which serves as the tower's second main tenant and occupies multiple floors in the tower. Other business process outsourcing (BPO) companies that occupies the tower's office spaces are Regus, AIG, TTEC, Horizon Recruitment Pacific Corporation, and Keller Williams Realty. On early 2022, GoodEgg BPO Inc. became the latest tenant to occupy the building, which is located at the 24th floor. The Gateway Tower is also a PEZA-certified building, making the tower business-friendly due to various fiscal incentives offered to businesses. On April 7, 2025, VFS Global opened its Japan Visa Application Center located at the 3rd floor of the Gateway Tower Mall.

The tower is fitted with a centralized air-conditioning system that caters all floors of the tower, and also features a sculpture crafted by Filipino National Artist Benedicto Cabrera (BenCab), known as the Monumental Triptych, located at the tower's main lobby at the ground floor. The tower also features the Topiary Garden, an open-air area rooftop garden, and houses the Gateway Gallery, an Art museum that showcases history, arts and culture, which exhibits the Siningsaysay: Philippine History in Art, in a partnership with the University of the Philippines Diliman and the UP Alumni Association, located on the tower's fifth floor. The tower also features a 2-storey multi-purpose penthouse for various activities, located at the building's two topmost floors, and a helipad on the tower's roofdeck.

== Gallery ==
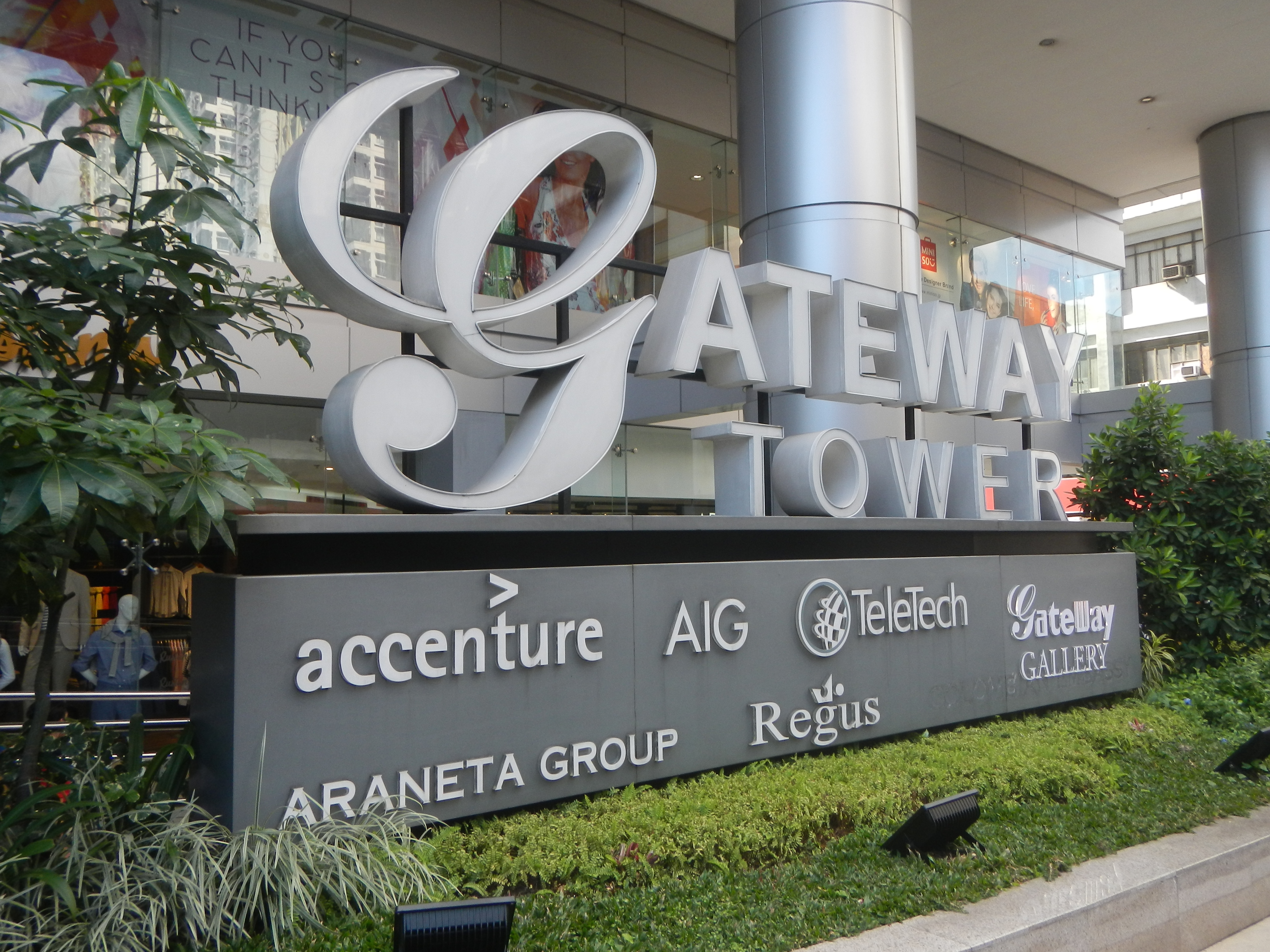
Tenants of the Gateway Tower

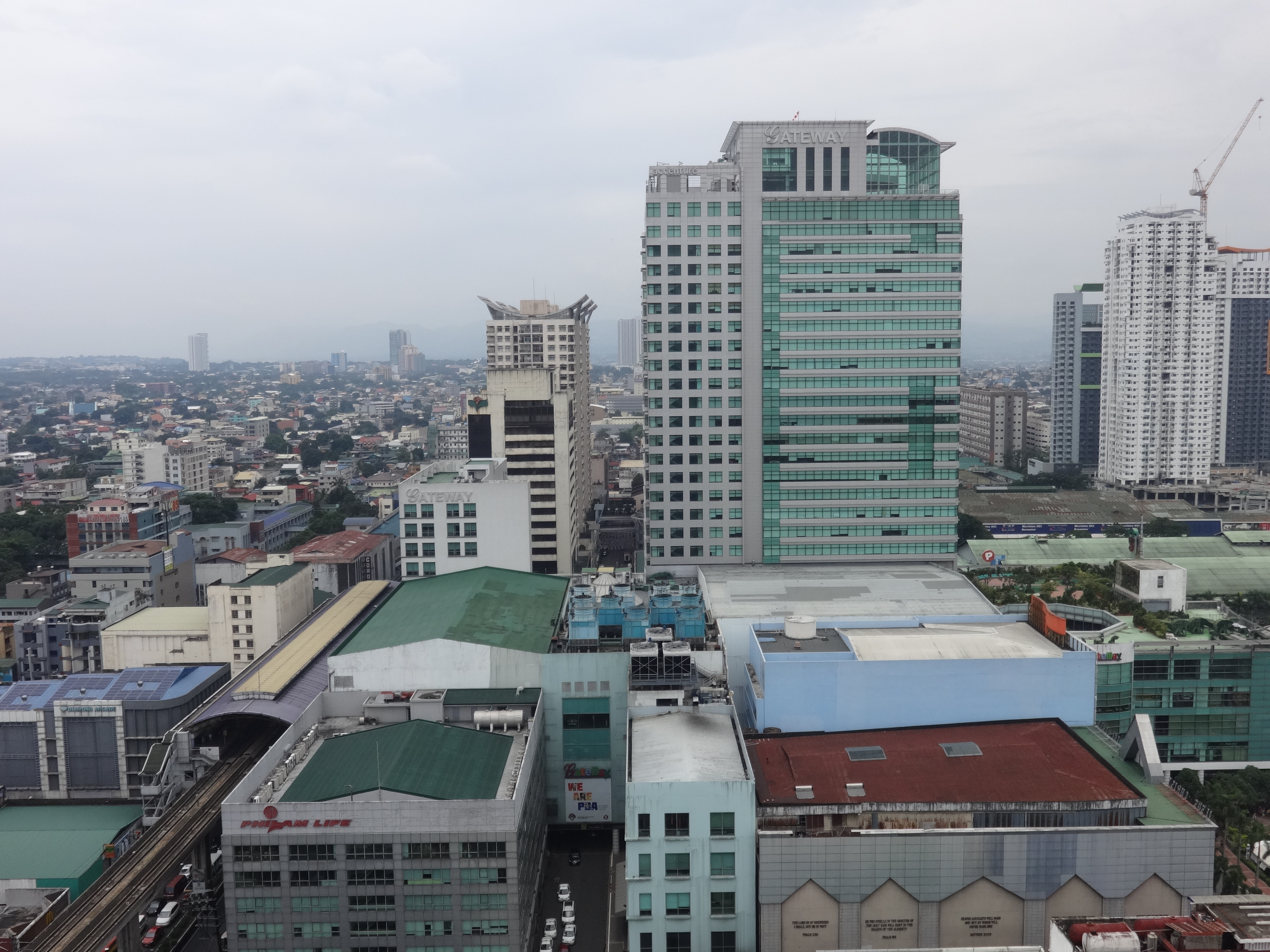
The Gateway Tower and buildings along Aurora Boulevard and Araneta City in the background.

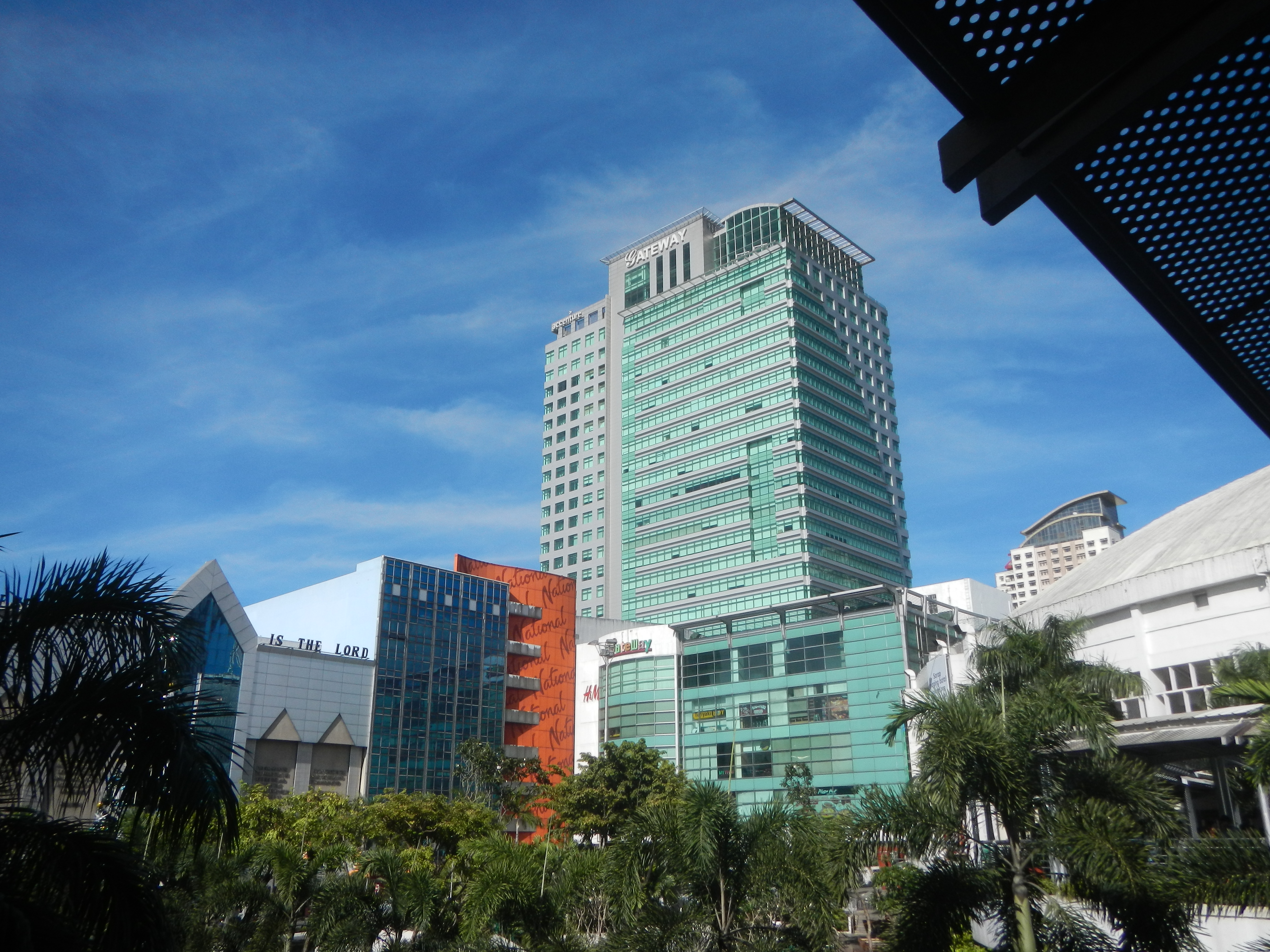
The Gateway Tower in 2016

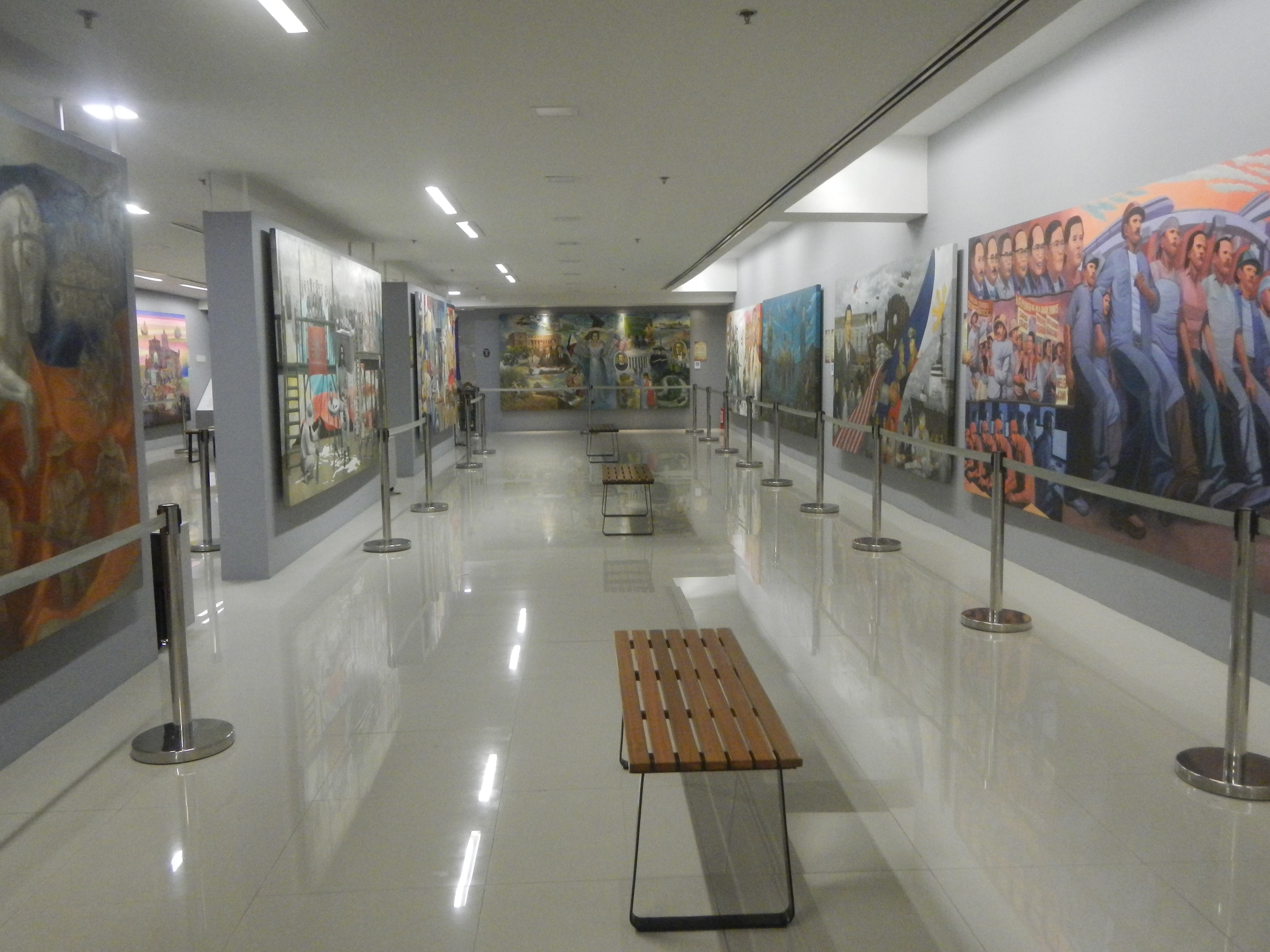
The Gateway Gallery

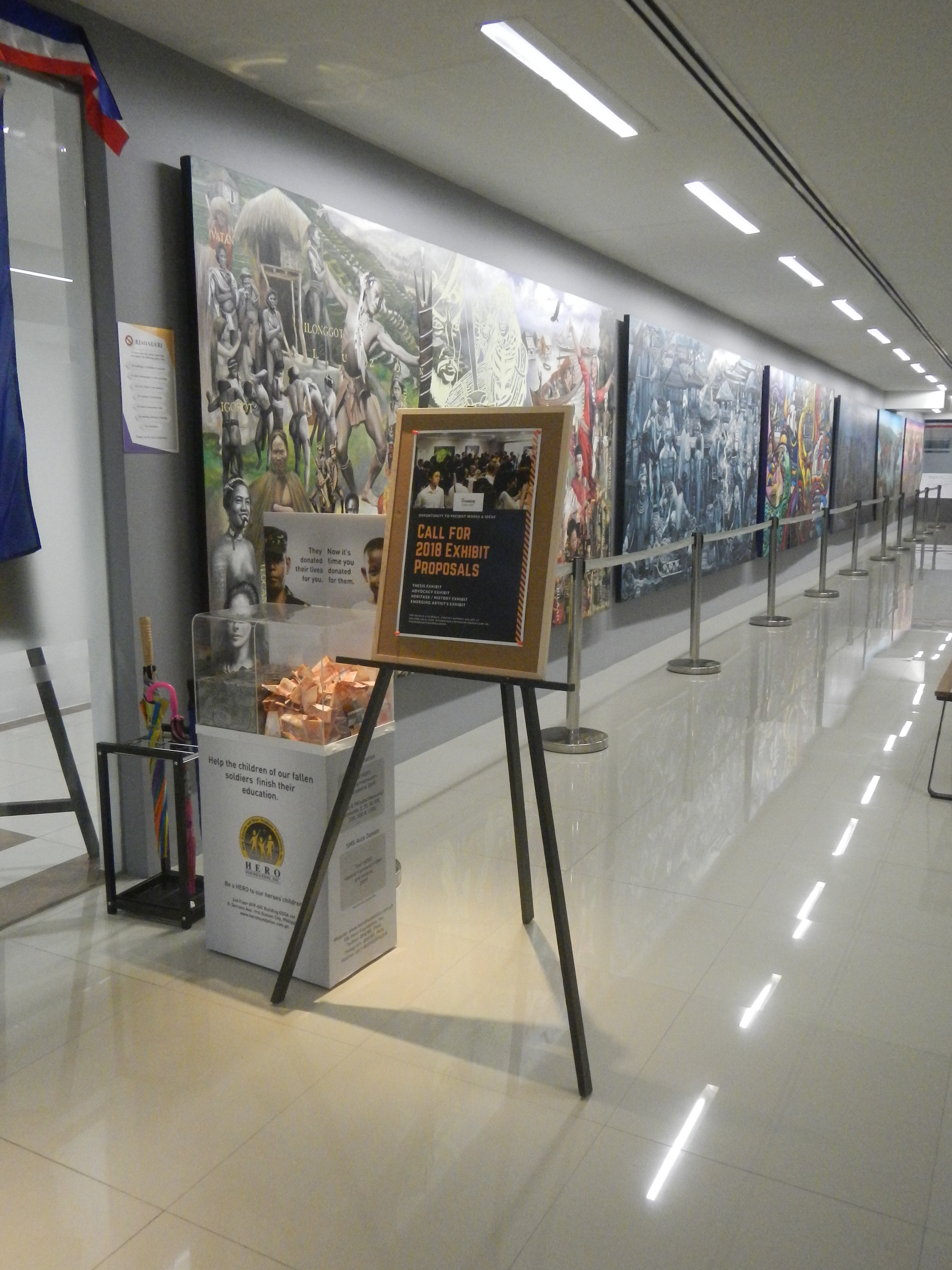
Paintings within the entrance of the Gallery

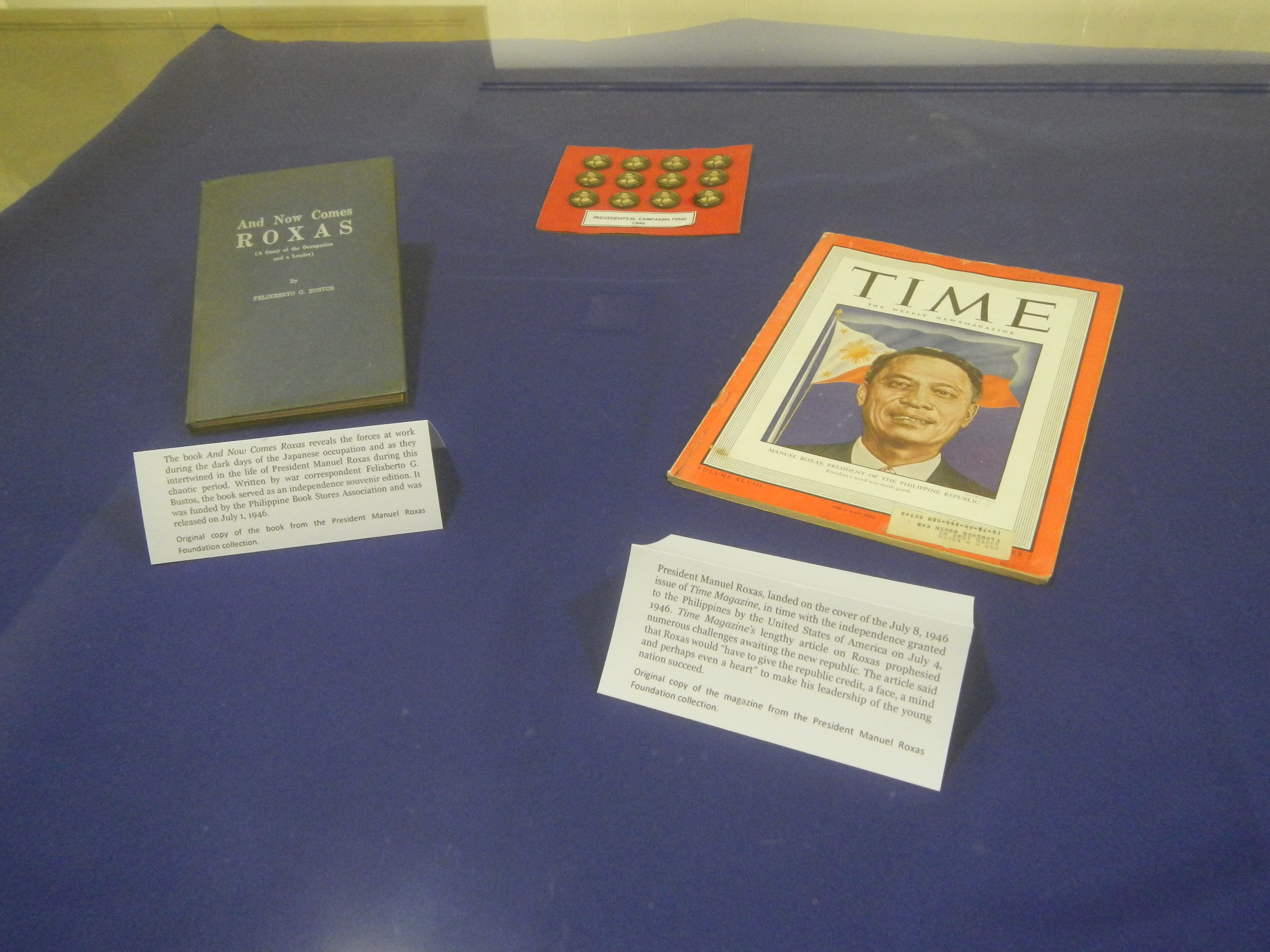
Displayed books and pins about Former President Manuel Roxas

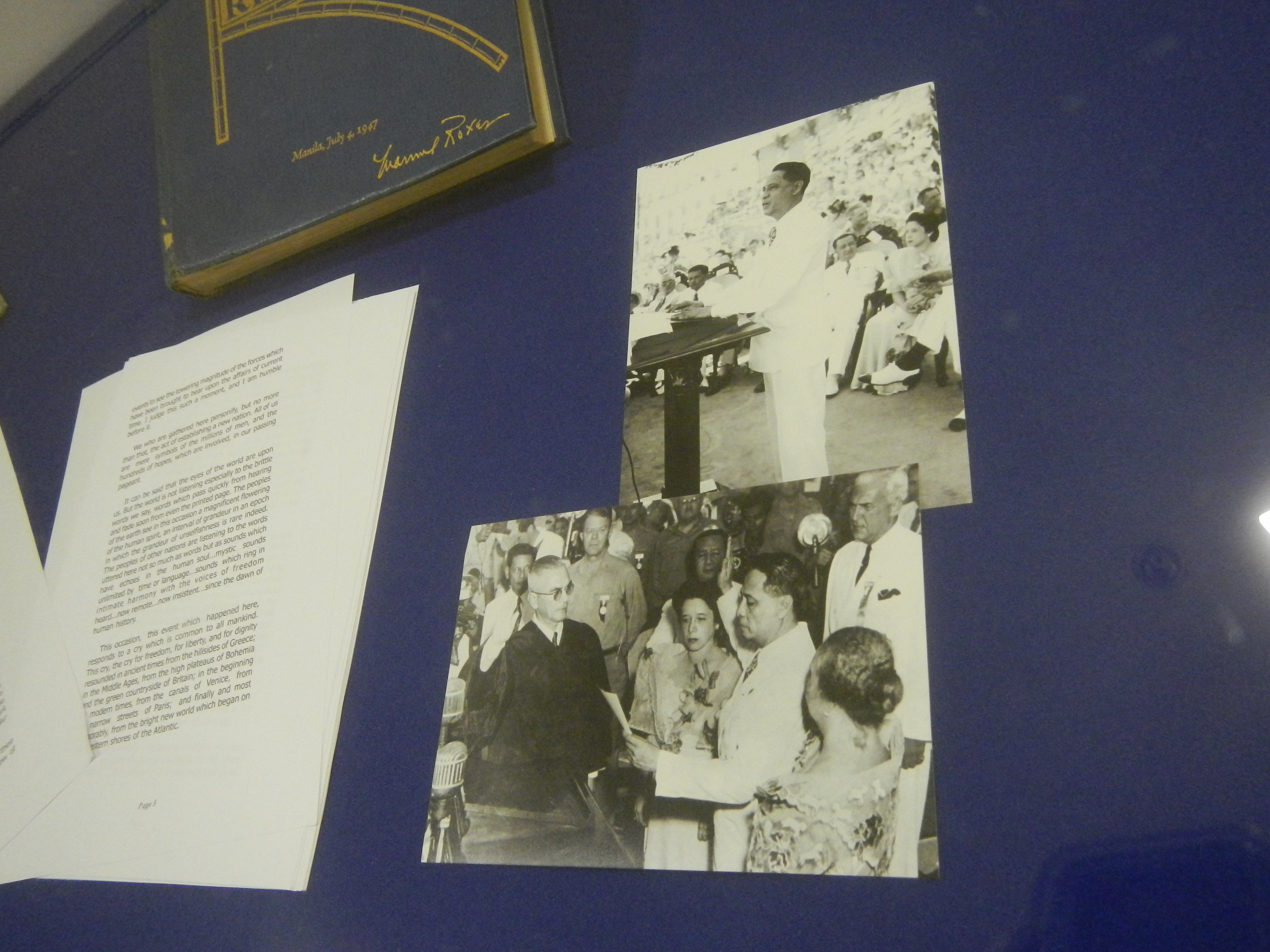
Displayed memoirs of Former President Roxas
