= Gateway Mall (Quezon City) =

Shopping mall in Cubao, Quezon City, Philippines

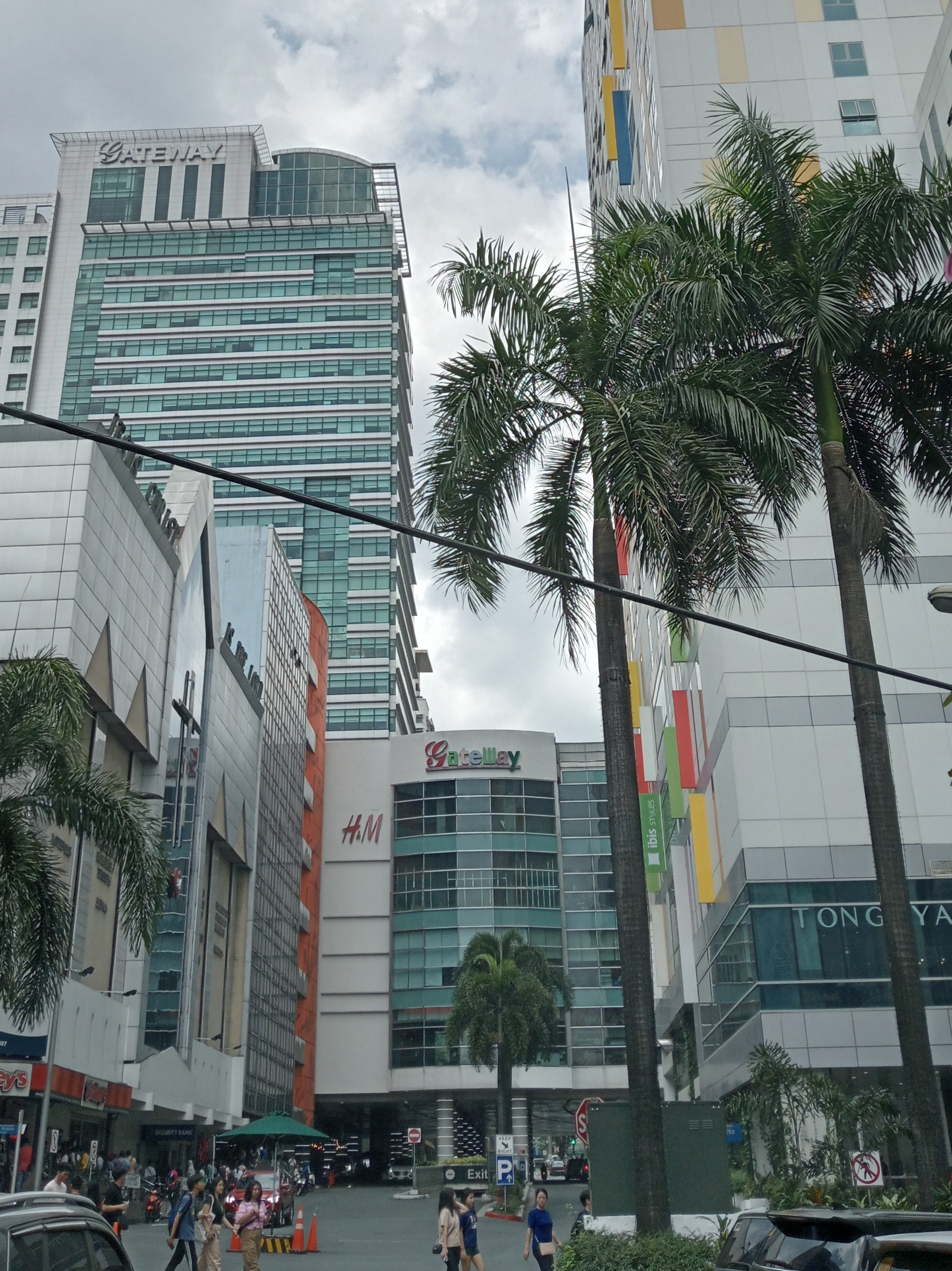
- The mall in 2024
- Location: Araneta City, Barangay Socorro, Cubao, Quezon City, Philippines
- Coordinates: 14°37′19″N 121°03′11″E
- Opened: Gateway Mall 1: October 15, 2004; 22 years ago; Gateway Mall 2: September 1, 2023; 3 years ago
- Developer: Araneta City, Inc.
- Manager: Araneta City, Inc.
- Owner: Araneta City
- Architect: RTKL Associates & Palafox Associates (Gateway 1); Aidea (Gateway Mall 2)
- Num. of stores: 342 (including kiosks, restaurants and dining outlets)
- Num. of anchor tenants: 1
- Floor area: 300,000 m^{2} (3,200,000 sq ft)
- Floors: Gateway 1: 6 + 3 basement parking levels; Gateway 2: 8 + 3 basement parking levels
- Parking: 1,435 slots
- Public transit: Araneta Center-Cubao; Araneta Center-Cubao; 51 53 61 Farmers Plaza; UBE Araneta City Bus Port; 1 Cubao; Future: E Cubao
- Website: Gateway Mall

Gateway Mall is a shopping mall located at the Araneta City in Cubao, Quezon City, Philippines. Owned and operated by the Araneta City, Inc. (ACI, Inc.), a subsidiary of the Araneta Group, the mall was completed in 2004 and currently has 300,000 m^{2} (3,200,000 sq ft) of total floor area, making the mall one of largest in the Philippines. The Gateway Mall also currently sits on the northern area of the Araneta City, located at the northern end of the Araneta Coliseum and attracts over 220,000 shoppers daily, due to its close proximity and direct connections to transport terminals and train stations.

The Gateway Mall underwent an expansion project which was completed in 2023 named the Gateway Mall 2, located along the western side of the Araneta Coliseum. The expansion featured a variety of additional shops and restaurants, as well as new leisure amenities and also includes the Ibis Styles Araneta City within the development.

== History and planning ==
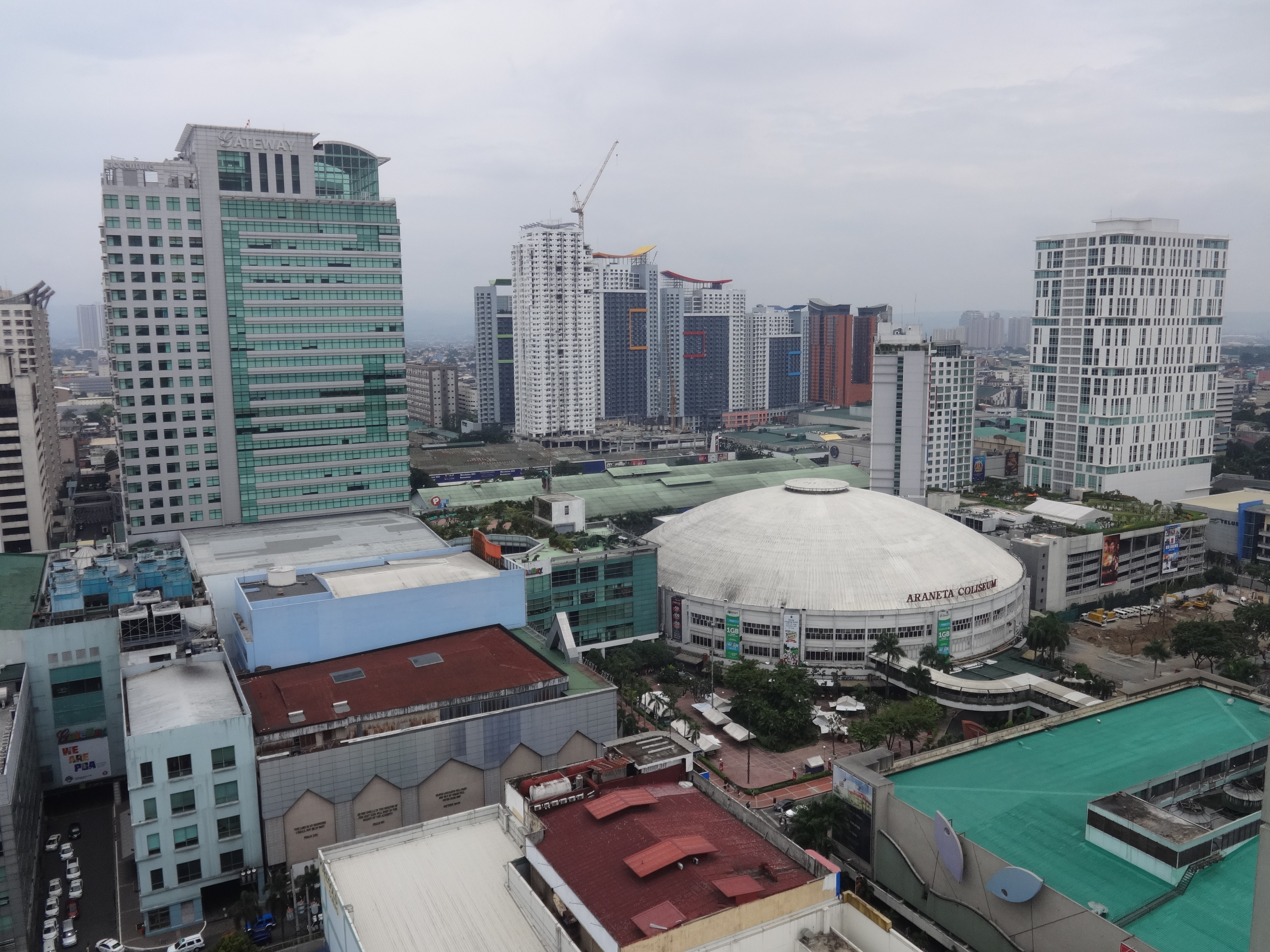
The Gateway Mall and The Gateway Tower (Gateway Complex), located at the left side of the Smart Araneta Coliseum, with the upcoming construction of the Gateway Mall 2, as of 2017.

The Gateway Mall was once known as the "Millenium Mall" project, a planned 7-storey mall adjacent to the Araneta Coliseum in the early stages of planning of the Araneta Center Redevelopment Master Plan. The redevelopment plan also included the "Manhattan Mall", a 200,000 m^{2} (2,200,000 sq ft) mixed-use development with retail and residential components, which became the present Manhattan Gardens complex, a 400-room business hotel now known as the Novotel Manila Araneta City, and the "Manila Tower", a 300 m (984.3 ft) planned mixed-use tower with communication facilities, as part of the Araneta Center Master Plan in the year 2000, and was established in 2002, under a ₱66.25 billion (US$1.25 billion) budget.

For the full commencement of the project, the Araneta Group tapped Felino Palafox of Palafox Associates and Sudhakar Thakurdesai of RTKL Associates as the main architects and urban planners of the project, along with the Deshazo Starek and Tang (now Deshazo Group), Jones Lang LaSalle Incorporated and Colliers International as main consultants of the master plan. The plans for the mall contains a large part of the Araneta City, spanning from the Araneta Center–Cubao Line 2 station, around the west side of the Smart Araneta Coliseum, up to the Farmer's Market and General McArthur Avenue, with connections to the adjacent Farmers Plaza. The planned mall is included within the master plan of various developments covering malls and commercial buildings with retail spaces, which aims to have a total floor area of 600,000 m^{2} (6,500,000 sq ft) for retail spaces, with plans including an additional 340,000 m^{2} (3,700,000 sq ft) of entertainment spaces, which consisted of a full scale skating rink, a cineplex, an IMAX Theater, a bowling alley, and a children and family entertainment center, which is aimed to have a total of 972,000 m^{2} (10,460,000 sq ft) of overall retail space in the Araneta City. The master plan commenced with the construction of the Gateway Mall on September 30, 2002, and the Gateway Mall 2 in 2017. Within the next few years, an additional expansion plan was being laid out for the upcoming Gateway Mall 3, planned to be built along the Cyberpark Tower 3 site.

== Development ==
The Gateway Mall 1, along with the Gateway Mall 2 (New Gateway), and other nearby properties such as the Gateway Tower, the Gateway Office Building, the Araneta Coliseum, the Araneta Coliseum Parking Garage, the Novotel Manila Araneta City, and the Ibis Styles Hotel are situated within the Gateway Square complex. The Gateway Square is a 5-hectare (12-acre) mixed-use development within the Araneta City, offering retail, dining, leisure, lodging, and entertainment facilities. The complex was completed in 2023 and is also set to have 400,000 m^{2} (4,300,000 sq ft) of floor area, including a total of 3,100 parking spaces. The complex is also connected to other buildings and developments within the Araneta City through sky bridges and walk paths.

=== Gateway Mall 1 ===
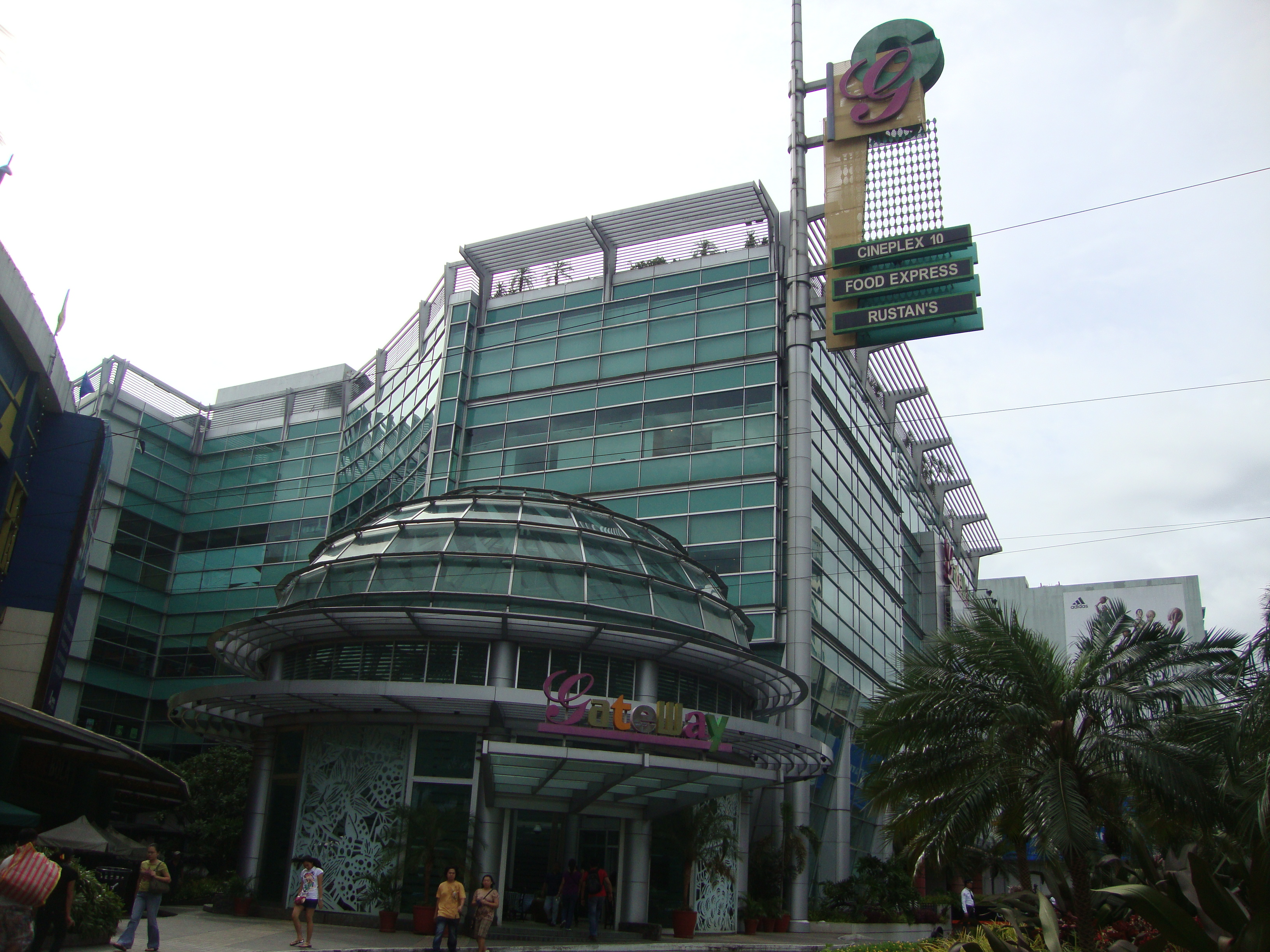
The Gateway Mall's fabergé egg-designed entrance pavilion from Gen. Aguinaldo Avenue and the Araneta Coliseum in 2010

==== Planning, construction, and development ====
The ₱2.5 billion, 85,000 m^{2} (910,000 sq ft) shopping complex was originally occupied by the Aurora Shopping Arcade, which became the Gateway-LRT 2 concourse, the Quezon Arcade and Plaza Fair, one of the main department stores in the area, until the building was demolished within 2001. The mall became the first property to break ground under the Araneta Center Redevelopment Plan, in which the project broke ground and commenced construction on October 14, 2002 before the mall opened on October 15, 2004, tapping CE Construction Corporation as the project's general contractor. However, the mall encountered construction and funding issues with its contractor, and the Araneta Group was forced to pay ₱114 million for the issues caused by the mall's construction. The mall was also a part of the Metro Centro Project of Quezon City Mayor Feliciano Belmonte Jr.. The mall's owner, Jorge L. Araneta, hired Sudhakar Thakurdesai of RTKL Associates as the main architect of the project, and Ralph Peter Jentes of Hyatt International Hotels for the services offered in the mall.

==== Features ====
Gateway Cineplex

The Gateway Mall 1 has five levels above ground primarily for retail use and three levels of basement parking space, for a total floor area of 100,000 m^{2} (1,100,000 sq ft) before expansion. The mall has a total of 213 shops, which includes Rustan's as the primary anchor tenant and 78 restaurants and food stalls, and hosts primarily upscale, electronics, and fashion shops, such as Automatic Centre Digital Plaza, H&M, Uniqlo, Miniso, Samsung, Apple Store, Lacoste, Xiaomi, Robinsons Supermarket and other retail shops, restaurants, and dining outlets.

Gateway 1 also highlights a Fabergé egg-designed glass pavilion located along General Aguinaldo Avenue, which took its inspiration to the Araneta Coliseum and features a high-ceiling glass dome that blends both steel and glass. The pavilion is also surrounded by alleyway of restaurants with al-fresco dining spaces known as the Coliseum Circle and the Courtyard, and connects the adjacent Araneta Coliseum through the mall's sidewalks and alleyways. The exterior designs of the pavilion and the interior designs of the mall were inspired from Filipino festivals and motifs of various patterns. The mall features an activity atrium; The Oasis, an indoor, air-conditioned open-roof garden; The Gateway Gallery; and The Topiary Garden, an open-air rooftop garden, both located at the 5th level. The 3rd level of the mall houses The Food Express food court, and the 4th level of the mall contains the first 10-cinema cineplex of the Gateway Cineplex 18, which features an indoor skylight in its main lobby and includes the 500-seater Cinema 5 and the Platinum Cinema.

Gateway 1 is directly connected to the lower six retail levels of the adjacent Gateway Tower, known as the Gateway Tower Mall. The expansion increased the mall's space with additional 15,000 m^{2} (160,000 sq ft) of retail space, and was completed in 2013. The mall is also directly connected to the Farmers Plaza, and the Smart Araneta Coliseum through the Gateway Mall 2, which was previously accessed via footbridge, giving direct access to the MRT 3 Cubao Station. The mall is also directly connected to the LRT 2 Cubao Station, the 11-storey Gateway Office Building located adjacent to the LRT 2 Cubao Station Concourse and the Ibis Styles Araneta City. Other direct connections include an elevated link bridge connecting the mall to the New Frontier Theater. In 2018, the Araneta Group announced renovation plans for the Gateway Mall 1, and eventually began in August 2025, with renovation works being constructed along the Gateway Cineplex area. The Cineplex's newly renovated hallway was opened in October 2025 and features similar designs to the Gateway Mall 2's cineplex hallway. In November 2025, plans were laid out for the renovation of the Coliseum Circle area, which will soon feature a glass-covered rooftop covering the Courtyard area of the mall while adding more al-fresco dining spaces for restaurants.

=== Gateway Mall 2 (New Gateway) ===
The construction of the New Gateway Mall, taken in April 2022

==== Planning, construction and development ====
The New Gateway (Gateway Mall 2) is an 8-storey expansion project of the Gateway Mall. Plans for the Gateway Mall 2 complex were laid out in 2014, yet the development's proposals were laid out as early as 2000 during the early stages of the Araneta Center Master Plan. Construction commenced in 2017 at a cost of ₱6.5 billion, wherein ₱5 billion were spent for the New Gateway Mall and ₱1.5 billion for the Ibis Styles Hotel. The new expansion of the mall stands at the former Gateway Food Park, the former Gateway-Farmers Plaza elevated walkway and an open lot parking space, located at the west side of the Smart Araneta Coliseum (Red Gate), giving easy and direct access to the Farmers Plaza, the Smart Araneta Coliseum, the Araneta Center–Cubao MRT Station and the Ibis Styles Araneta City, a 286-room economy hotel.

Gateway Mall 2 is a part of the Araneta Center Redevelopment Plan. The mall's construction began in the second quarter of 2017, where the foundations linking to the Farmers Plaza was constructed, and in August 2017, the former Gateway Food Park, as well as the former parking space located on the Coliseum's western Red Gate facade, were excavated to give way for the construction of the main building of the mall, while the official groundbreaking ceremony followed on July 31, 2018. Megawide Construction Corporation served as the general contractor of the project, while the Araneta Group tapped Aidea as the main architectural firm. The Araneta Group also hired Stages, Design and Construction (SDC) for the ending phases of construction and finishing works, J.B Pascual Construction Services for supply and installation works, and AMCOM & Company Inc. as the general consultant of the project. The new mall will comply with basic LEED development standards.

The New Gateway Mall officially topped off on February 11, 2020, and is originally scheduled for completion in the 4th quarter of 2020, to commemorate the 60th anniversary opening of the Araneta Coliseum. However, due to the effects of the COVID-19 Pandemic in the country, the construction and opening of the mall, along with the adjacent Ibis Styles Hotel was delayed, and the construction cost of the entire complex grew from ₱6.5 billion to ₱7 billion, wherein ₱2 billion were allocated for the Ibis Styles Hotel. Major design changes were also made in the mall's architectural designs and exteriors. The new complex was expected to embark its grand opening within 2024, after being partially opened on April 9, 2023 (Easter Sunday), before being fully opened in September 2023. The opening of the mall was eventually moved thrice from its original opening date within December 2022, and was initially moved on the first quarter of 2023 and to November 2023.

==== Features ====
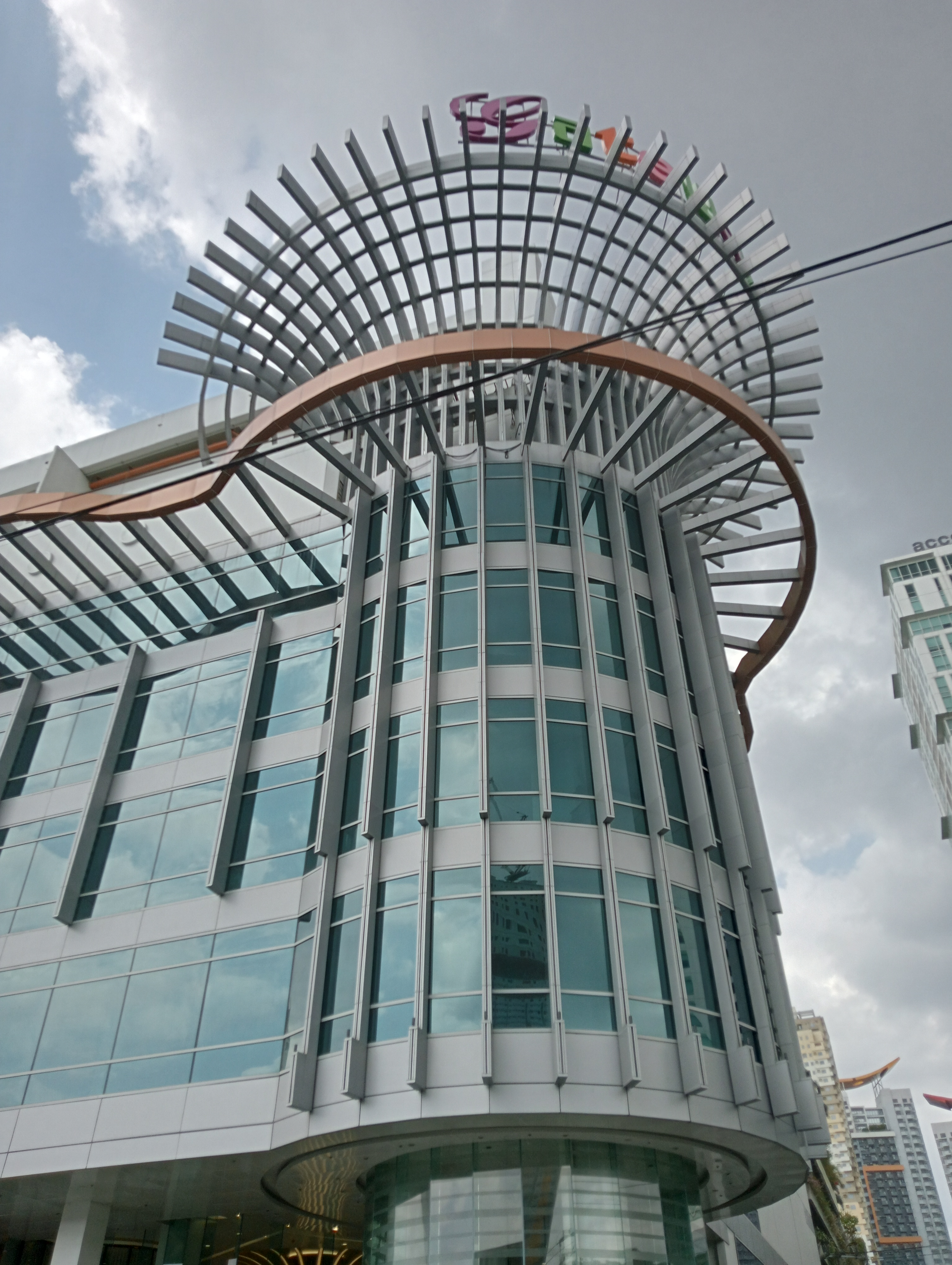
The Gateway Mall 2's tree-inspired crown located on the mall's grand entrance within the corners of General Araneta & General McArthur Avenues

The Lagoon at Gateway 2

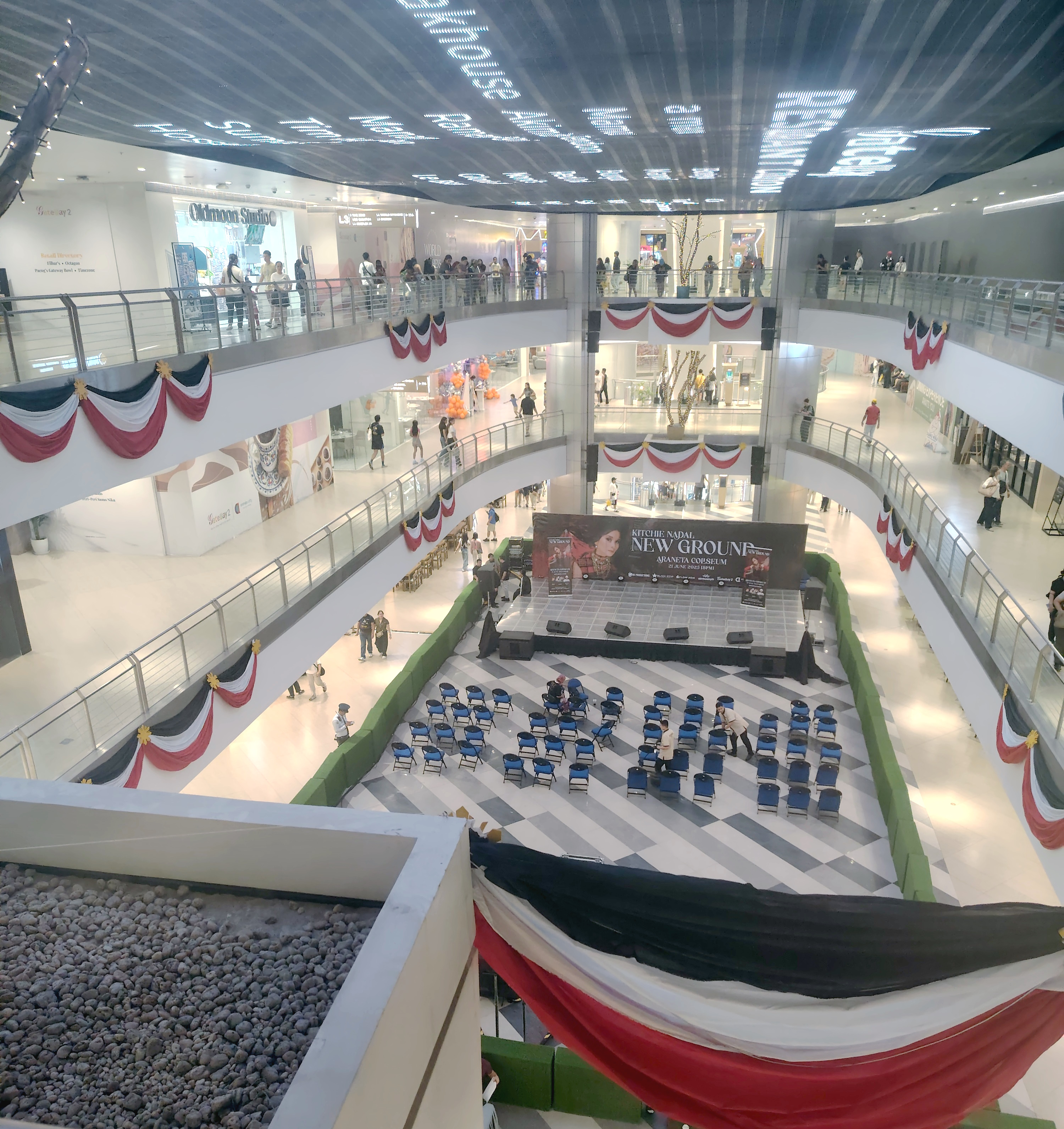
The Gateway Mall 2's Quantum Skyview activity atrium area

The Gateway Mall 2 features a nature-inspired contemporary architectural designs within the mall's interiors and exteriors, which can be seen in various areas around the mall such as The Lagoon fountain, an indoor water feature surrounded by the Lagoon Restaurant Collection, a restaurant row located at the Ground floor; a Coliseum Plaza filled with restaurants at the Ground Level located adjacent to the Smart Araneta Coliseum Red Gate entrance; and a 700 m^{2} (7,500 sq ft) activity area atrium with ceiling-installed LED screens, known as the Quantum Skyview located within Upper Ground-B Level. The Quantum Skyview is also the first wave-shaped, ceiling-installed LED screen in the country.

The mall also includes an Asian Village food hub for restaurants based within the Asia-Pacific region, occupying the 2nd floor; while the third floor houses a Pop Culture Center housing a K-Pop and P-Pop themed Cafe, and a Bowling Center named Paeng's Gateway Bowl. The 4th floor houses the expansion of the 18-cinema Gateway cineplex and the World Kitchens food hall, while the 5th floor houses the Sensory Gardens and the Sagrada Familia Church. The Ibis Styles Hotel's restaurants, StrEats and Le Bistro, are also accessible within the mall's walkways.

The new mall has 200,000 m^{2} (2,200,000 sq ft) of total retail space and is set to house over 500 shops, including over 100 food and beverage shops and restaurants, and will also include retail, dining, nightlife, and leisure spaces. A Shopwise supermarket relocated from Fiesta Carnival to its new lower ground floor location in the new mall on July 28, 2023, occupying at least 3,760 m^{2} (40,500 sq ft) of retail space. Sunnies Studios, Daiso, and Foot Locker later opened.

On April 9, 2023, the mall became partially opened with Botejyu as its first restaurant tenant, followed with the opening of Dairy Queen, Manam, BLK 513, Pizza Hut, and Anta Sports. The Quantum Skyview Atrium was opened in a soft opening on May 20, 2023, during the Exo-SC Fancon Tour, while the first two restaurants within the Skyview Atrium, Classic Savory and Burgoo opened their new branch in the mall on May 26, 2023.

On May 23, 2023, the Araneta Group and Wolfgang's Steakhouse Philippines signed a contract to launch a its fifth branch, located in the mall's upper ground level. It will feature a grill concept, which serves as the second branch to have the concept following the opening of the steakhouse's branch in City of Dreams Manila. On 25 August 2023, Wolfgang's unveiled their preview display to the upcoming branch in the mall up to 3 September 2023, while Shake Shack simultaneously opened their latest branch located at the Coliseum Plaza, and serves as the first "stadium shack" to open in the country and the Asia-Pacific Region, due to the branch's direct access to the Araneta Coliseum. On October 3, 2023, Wolfgang's began their partial operations and on October 10, 2023, Wolfgang's made their grand opening in the mall, which was graced by Wolfgang's Steakhouse owner Wolfgang Zwiener and Quezon City Mayor Joy Belmonte, along with other officials. At present, the mall also houses the largest Mary Grace Café in the country, which is located at the Upper Ground Floor A level and occupies 500 m^{2} (5,400 sq ft) of dining and kitchen space, which was opened on November 6, 2023, as well as the largest KKV store in the country at the time, which made its full opening on April 5, 2023. On March 19, 2025, the first Cong Caphe coffee shop, a Vietnamese coffee chain, opened its doors and began its full operations in the mall, which is located at the mall's second floor.

On February 5, 2026, the Rosario, Pamanang Panlasa, a Filipino-themed restaurant, opened its second restaurant branch after the success of its main branch in Tagaytay City, marking the restaurant's first branch in Metro Manila. Located on the mall's upper ground floor, the restaurant also offers daily live folk dance performances and Filipino artistry courses.

===== Palenque =====
The Palenque is a 4,200 m^{2} (45,000 sq ft) food alley, formerly located along the mall's Upper Ground B floor, after being relocated from the 4th floor. The Filipino-themed food hall will various local dishes in the country, in association with Claude Tayag, which also has an establishment in the alley named Bale Dutung. Other tenants include Tindeli by Chef Tatung, B.E.L ILOCO by Al Puruganan, Palm Grill by Chef Miguel Cabel Moreno, Sa Salt by Davao Grill, and Chicken Fundian. The Palenque alsos feature Filipino culture, cuisine varieties, seasonal festivities, flower and fruit stalls, and handicrafts. The area was formally closed on March 2026 and was later redeveloped to become Tatung's, which opened on May 30, 2026, while its remaining portions were utilized for the expansion of the Viking's Luxury Buffet. Its other former restaurants were later separated and relocated into various parts of the mall.

===== World Kitchens =====
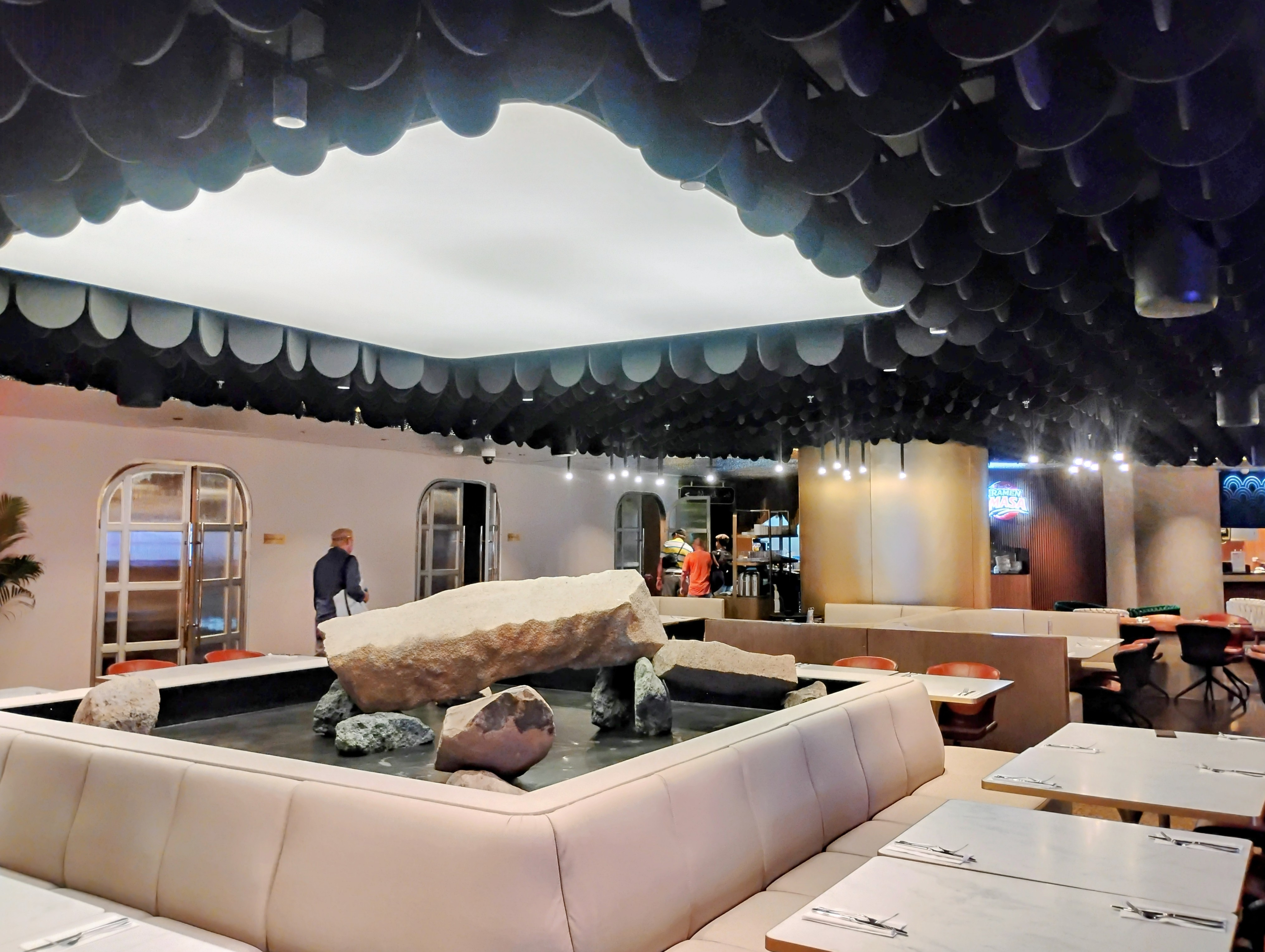
Interior of World Kitchens

Located across the Gateway Immersive Cinema at the fourth floor of the mall, the World Kitchens is an food hall created and designed by Singaporean food and beverage businessman Andrew Tan Hock Lai and features 15 show kitchens which serves a variety of international cuisines, such as Filipino, Singaporean, Hong Kong, Japanese, Indian, Italian, and Spanish cuisines. The restaurant took inspiration of worldwide comfort food concepts within a total floor area of 2,500 m^{2} (27,000 sq ft) and is capable of housing 700 guests. The World Kitchens restaurant also serves as the replacement of the planned organic culinary garden restaurant which was one of the mall's original plans, and also features an AI QR code ordering system and three private rooms. The food hall was opened and began its operations on January 20, 2025.

On February 12, 2025, the grand opening of the World Kitchens was held.

===== Sagrada Familia Church =====
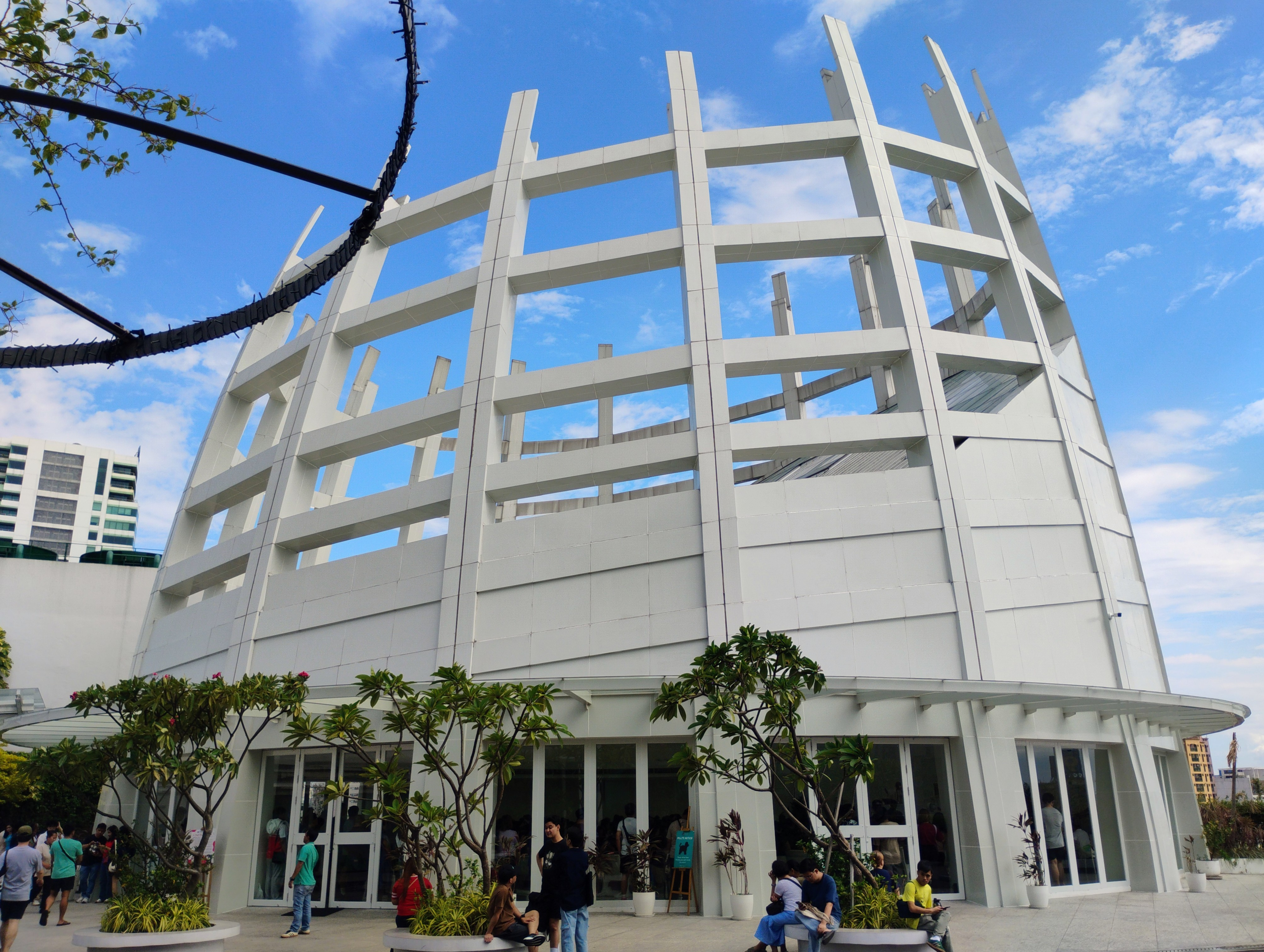
Sagrada Familia Church

The Sagrada Familia Church is a rooftop Roman Catholic church located along the 5th floor of the mall, situated to the adjacent Sensory Gardens. The church was inspired from the Mitre headgears worn by Catholic Priests and features an all-white architectural design, with its curved interiors stretching upwards to the sky taking inspiration from the Oculus building in New York City, and features high ceilings and modern church glass windows emphasizing natural light, while the church's hanging cross was sculpted and designed by Wilfredo Layug. The church is also air-conditioned and has a total capacity of 1,000 people.

On September 16, 2023, the chapel was baptized by Luis Antonio Cardinal Tagle. One day later, the first Sunday Mass was held at the chapel, with Roman Catholic Diocese of Cubao Bishop Honesto Ongtioco presiding the Mass.

===== Cineplex 18 =====
On December 25, 2023 (Christmas Day), an expansion of the Gateway Cineplex at the 4th Level was opened. The opening of the additional 8 cinemas has made the Gateway Cineplex the largest cineplex in the Philippines with 18 cinemas, including the first 10 cinemas at Gateway Mall 1, surpassing SM Megamall, which has 14 cinemas. Similar to the Gateway Mall 1's Cineplex area, the Gateway Mall 2's Cineplex features a skylight with an upward wave ceiling design within the main lobby, while the cinemas are also equipped with Dolby Atmos technology with La-Z-Boy seats. The opening of the cinema was made in time for the 2023 Metro Manila Film Festival, where 6 out of the 8 cinemas were opened. The cineplex will also include two additional Platinum Cinemas set to be completed within 2024.

On May 3, 2025, the mall opened the first and only Wolfgang's Premier Lounge in the world, which is located within the Cineplex 18 at the mall's fifth floor. The lounge features two upscale cinemas with a restaurant sandwiched in-between and blends the cinema experience with a "hotel club-like" ambiance with La-Z-Boy seats, Dolby Digital 7.1 sound systems, and high-end services, such as Wolfgang's signature dishes and cocktail mixes. The lounge has a total of 120 seats, where Cinema 1 has a total of 56 seats and Cinema 2 having 64 seats. The lounge is aimed to "elevate" the cinema experience with a luxurious, intimate and a memorable experience in one place. An additional cinema opened on September 24, 2025, alongside an expanded lounge, which features 78 seats and Dolby Atmos. Aside from cineplex spaces, the Gateway Cineplex also features the Gateway Immersive Cinema, a virtual reality (VR) auditorium that is utilized for VR concerts and VR exhibits.

==== Case settlement with Megawide ====
On April 18, 2023, a case was filed between the Araneta City Inc. (ACI) of the Araneta Group and Megawide Construction Corporation regarding costing issues in various projects within the complex, which included the Gateway Mall 2 and Ibis Styles Araneta City, and the Cyberpark Tower 2. The ACI filed a permissive counterclaim for the complaint filed by Megawide and has asked the Construction Industry Arbitration Commission (CIAC) to intervene and hasted the ongoing case, as Megawide was said to have violated the construction contract amounting to ₱1.53 billion, while ACI was also said to have violations worth ₱339.65 million, and the overall worth of the contract is worth ₱4.25 billion. The case was also the reason that the mall and hotel's construction was delayed and caused ACI to switch their general contractor to Stages, Design and Construction (SDC).

In a disclosure to the Philippine Stock Exchange, the ruling regarding the case was released on January 11, 2024, which favored Megawide's case and has resulted to the Araneta Group being responsible to pay Megawide ₱180.2 million with 6% interest per annum. Based on the verdict of the CIAC, Megawide was also awarded ₱596.9 million for the damages under the deal while the Araneta Group was awarded ₱416.7 million. In the aftermath of the case, Megawide commented that the case "will not have a significant impact" on the company's operations.

== Planned expansion ==
=== Gateway Mall 3 ===
The Gateway Mall 3 is a planned multi-level retail podium expansion project of the Gateway Mall, covering a total floor area of 100,000 m^{2} (1,100,000 sq ft) of retail space upon completion. The mall is currently on the conceptual stage, set to rise within the Telus House and will also occupy an open lot located behind the building, located in between the Cyberpark Tower 3 and the Cyberpark Tower 2. The planned mall is also planned to rise in the middle of the entire Araneta City Cyberpark complex, which surrounds the mall and will also connect all 5 office towers from each of the tower's retail spaces and underground parking levels. The planned features of the mall will consist of an outdoor park, underground parking spaces, and additional eco-friendly initiatives. Once completed, Gateway Malls 1, 2 and 3 will have an overall floor area of 390,000 m^{2} (4,200,000 sq ft) and will have approximately more than 800-1000 shops upon completion.

== Reception ==
Gateway Mall received critical acclaim from the retail and developer industries. The Philippine Retailers Association named the shopping mall as the Shopping Center of the Year twice, in 2006 and 2007. At the 30th Innovative Design and Development Awards of the International Council of Shopping Centers, the mall is a recipient of a Merit Award. It was also a finalist for the 2008 Urban Land Institute Awards for Excellence.

During the 2024 Retail Asia Awards held at Singapore, the Gateway Mall 2 was awarded as the country's New Mall of the Year Award. The Gateway Mall 2 was also awarded the Mall Innovation Award by the Philippine Retailers Association during the 2024 Outstanding Filipino Retailers (OFR) Awards held at the Solaire Resort North. The mall's World Kitchens food hall was named as the country's Food & Beverage Retailer of the Year during the 2025 Retail Asia Awards held in Singapore.

== Incidents ==
- November 9–10, 2012: A fire broke out at the basement of Gateway Mall at 22:05 PHT, reaching at third alarm until it was put out at 00:16 PHT. A report regarding the fire was made and showed that a malfunctioning generator have been the cause of the fire.

== Gallery ==
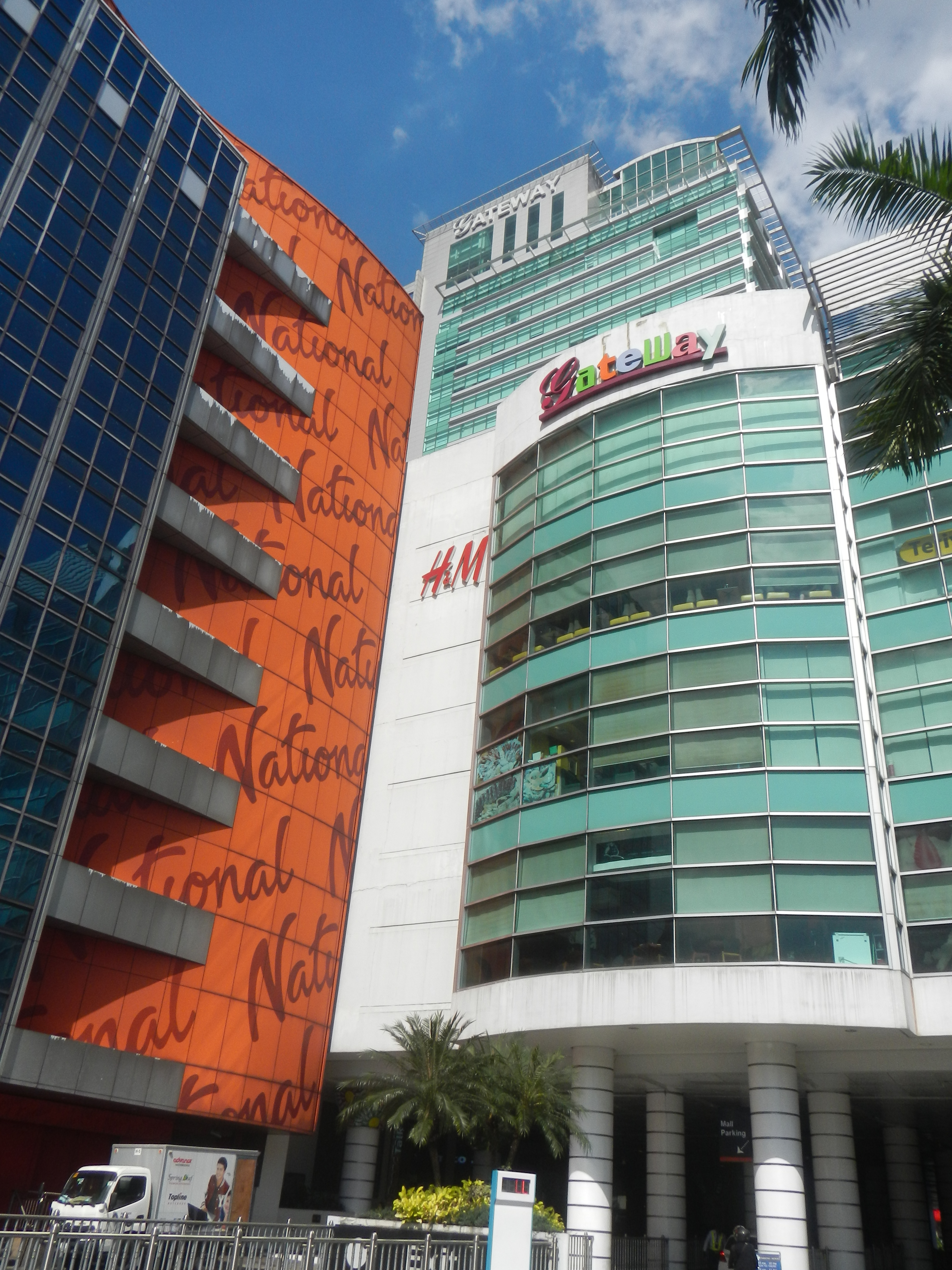
The Gateway Mall, with the National Book Store Superstore and the Gateway Tower

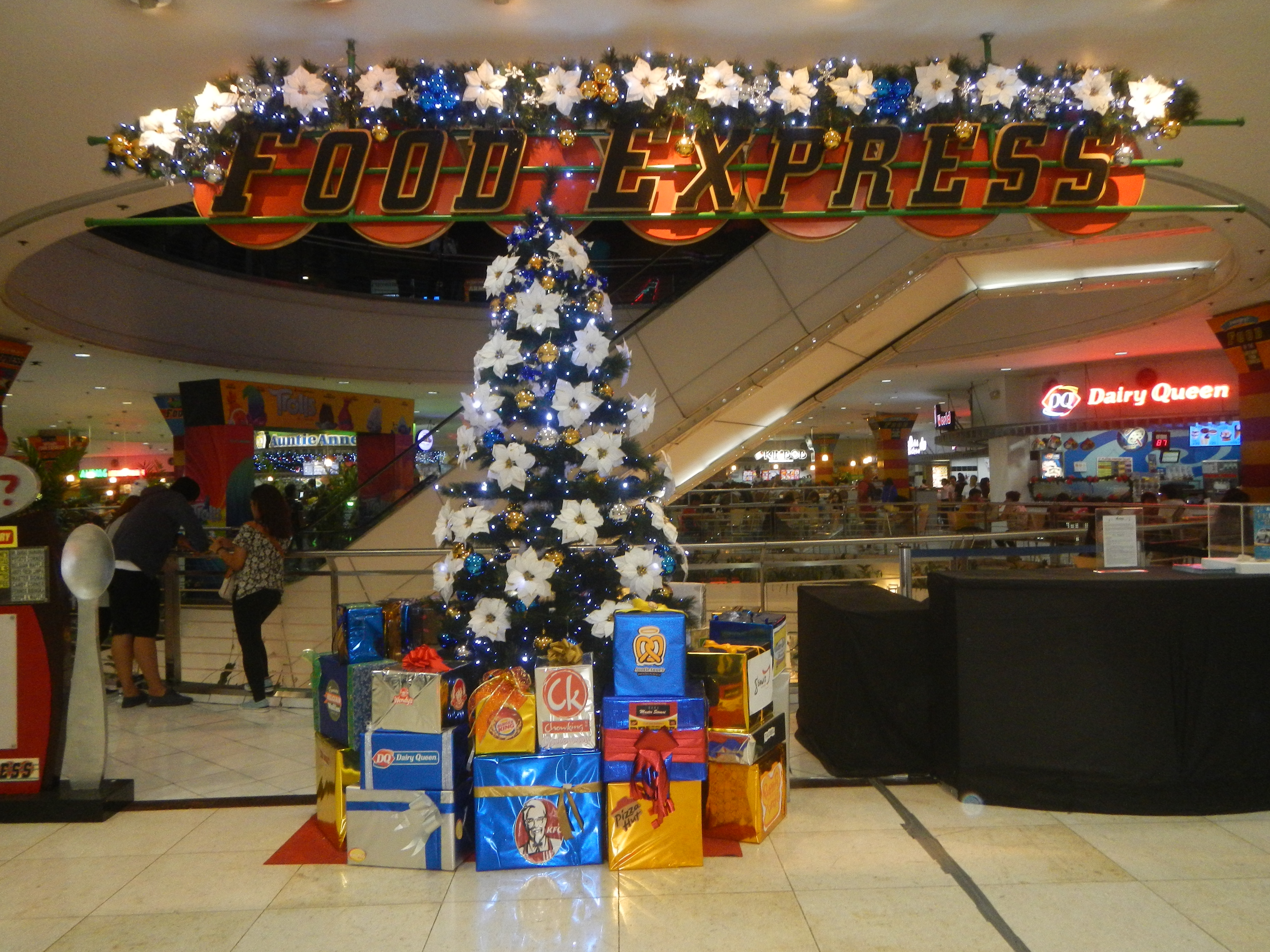
The Food Express food court

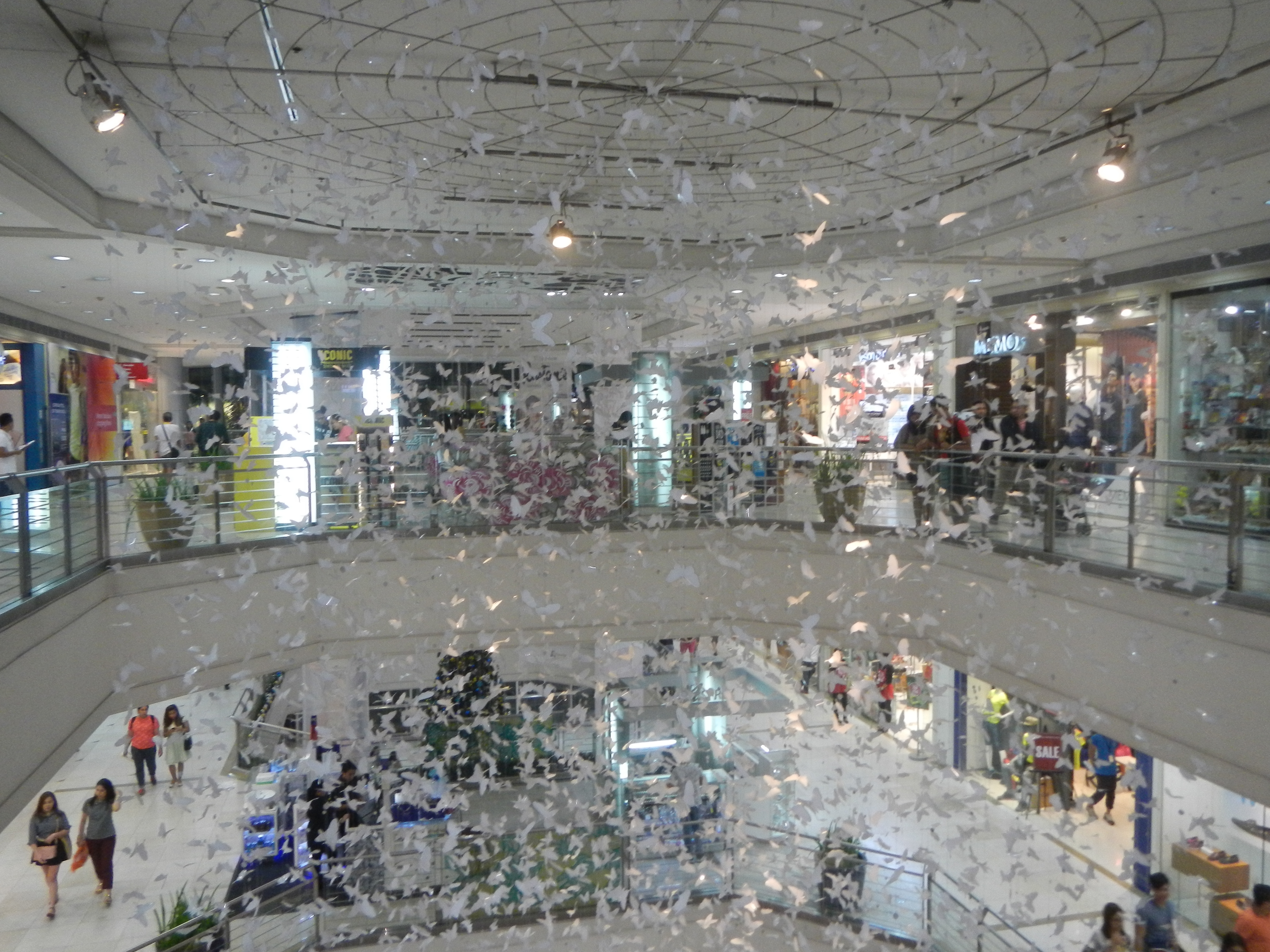
A set of Butterfly Hanging Decorations from the 4th level of the mall

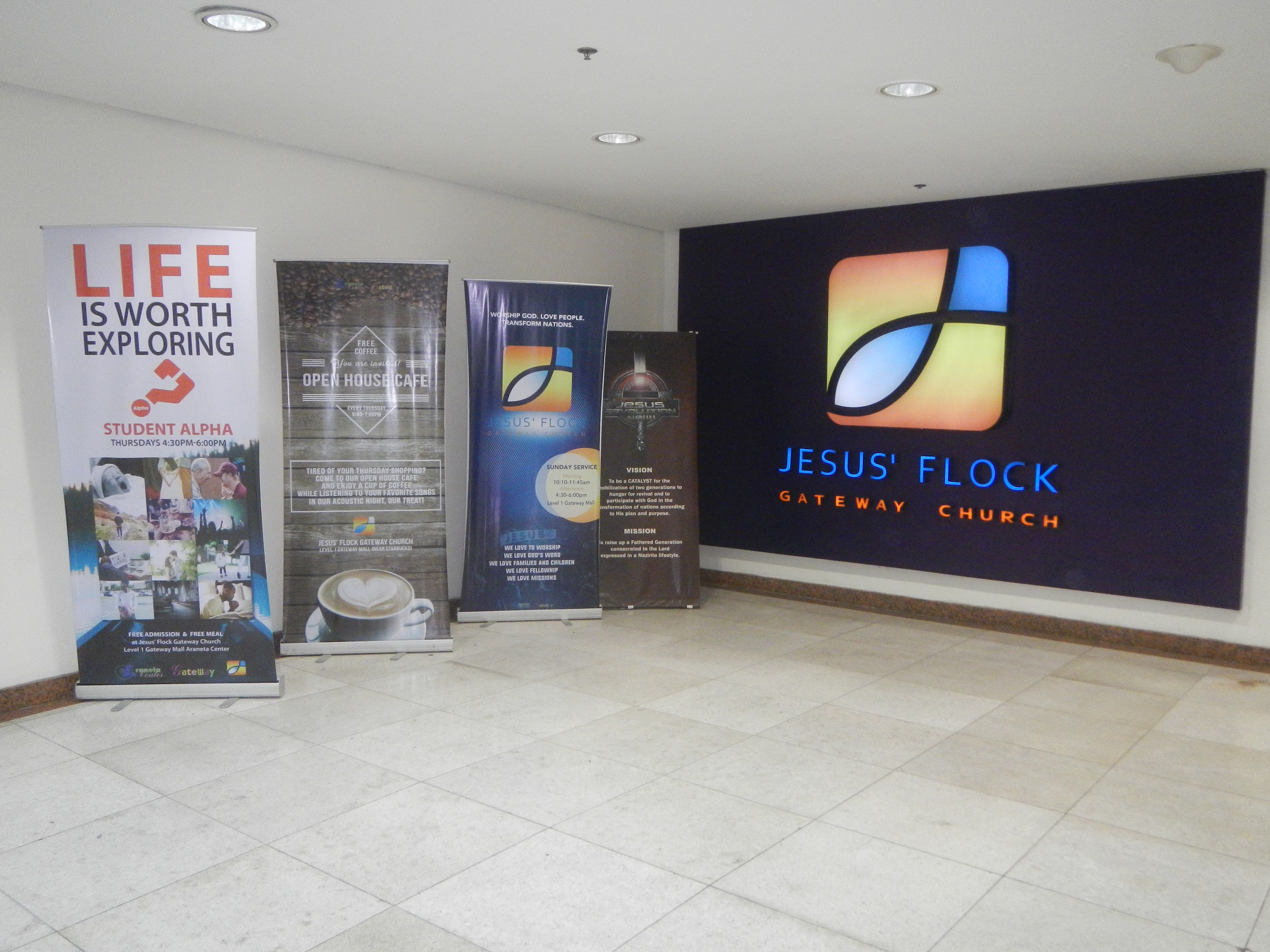
The Jesus' Flock Gateway Church

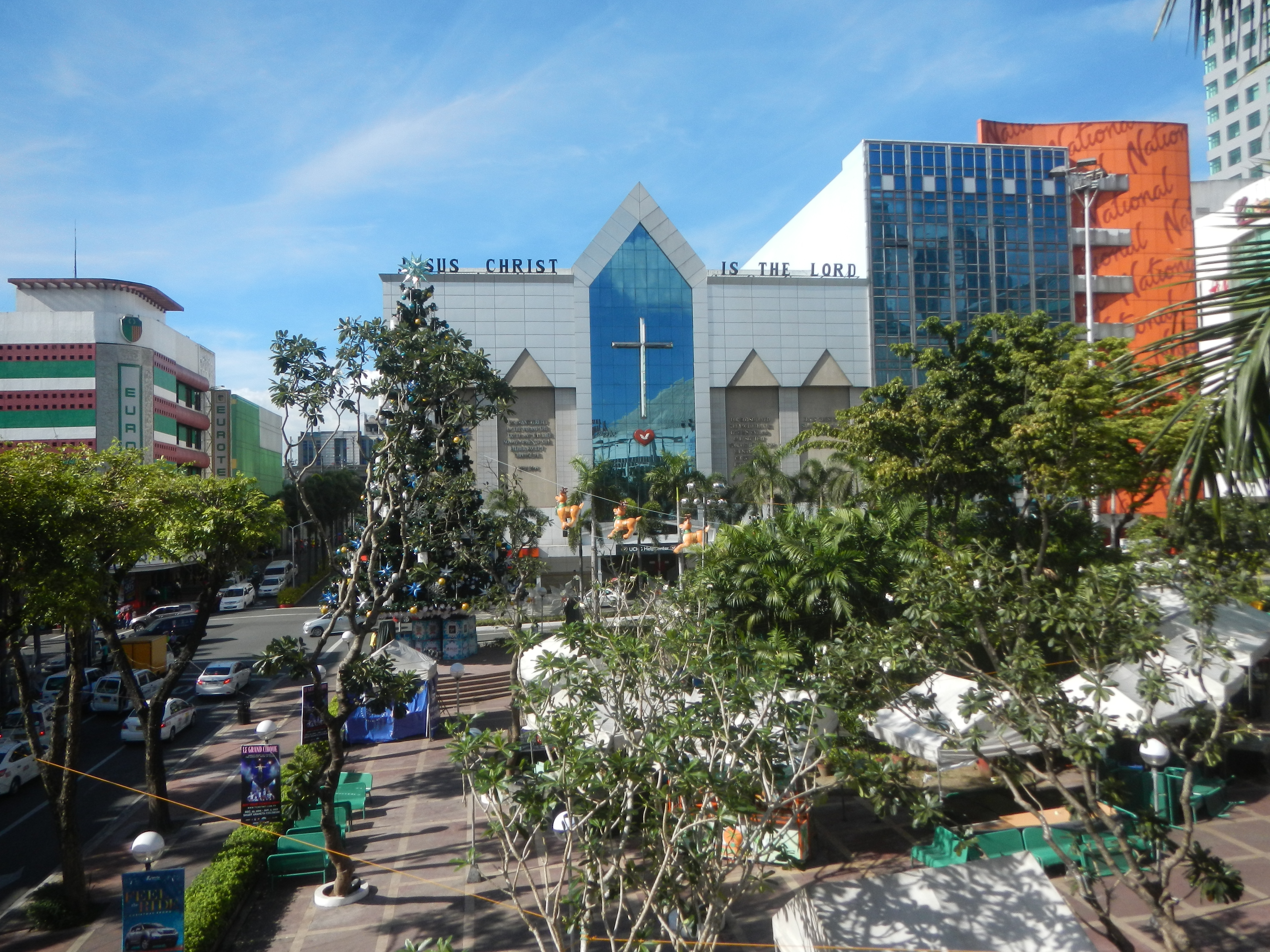
The former Gateway Food Park, where outdoor events are held. now part of Gateway Mall 2

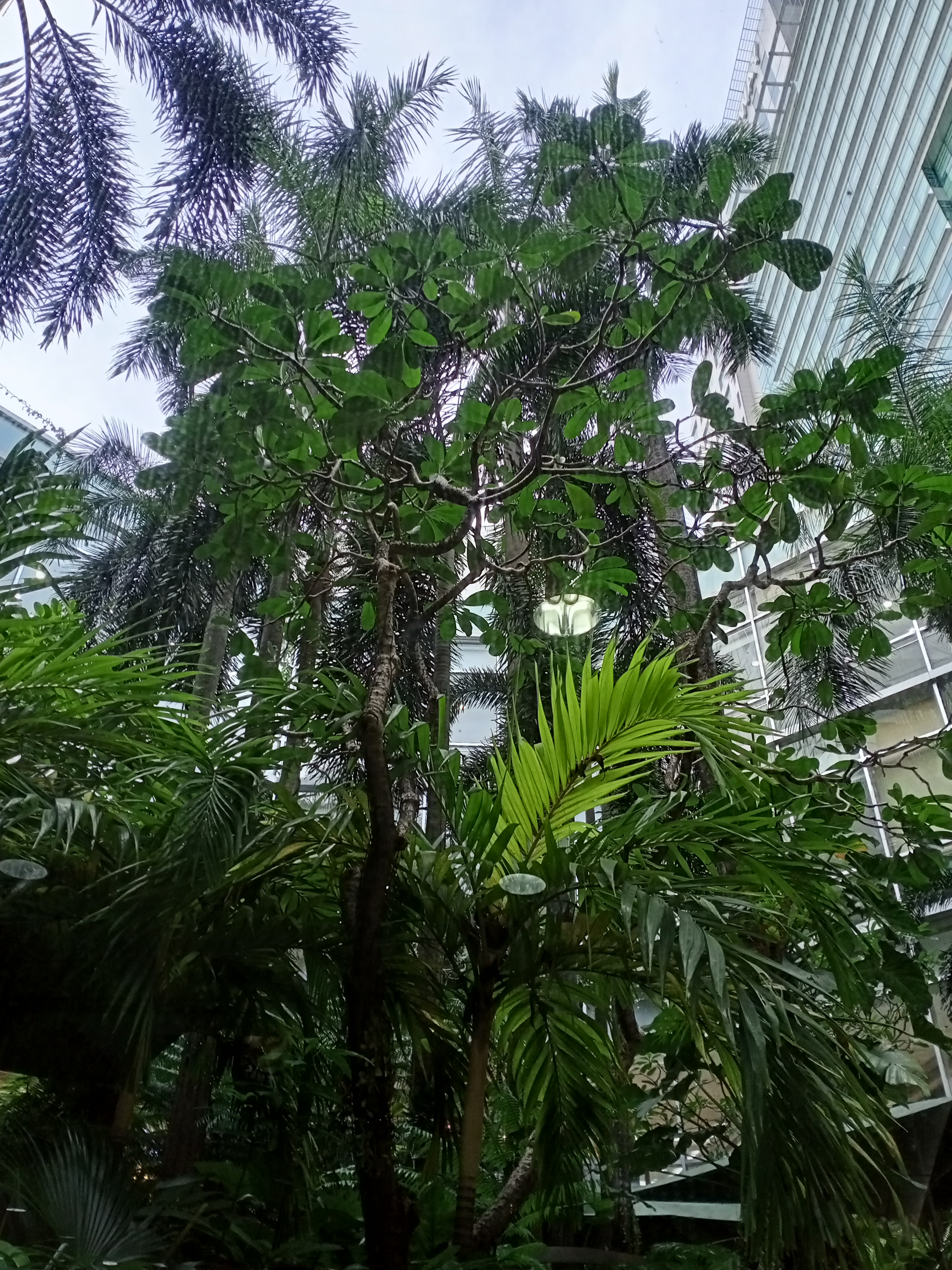
A view of The Oasis

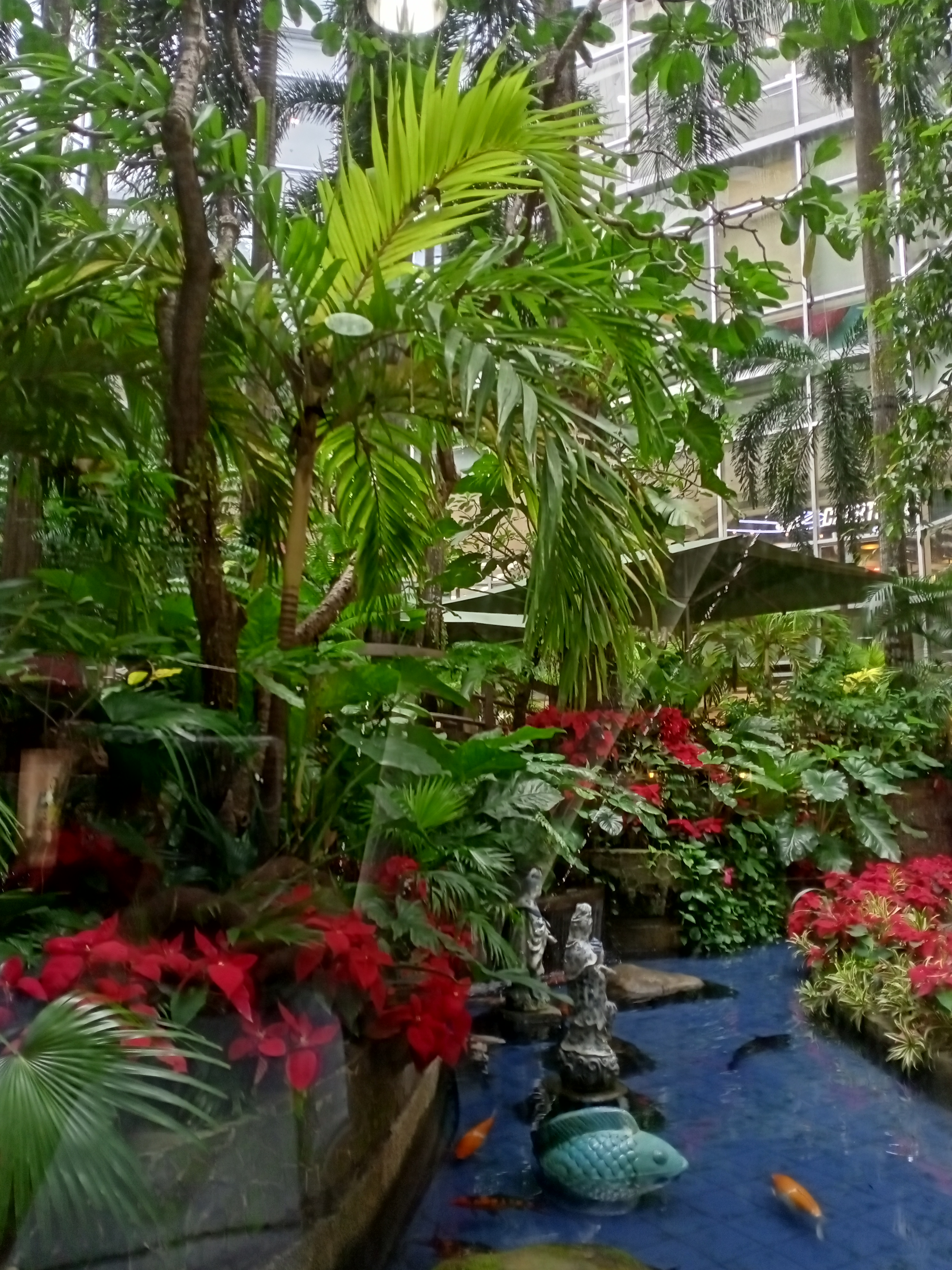
A view of the plants, flowers, water fountains, and al fresco dining at The Oasis
