= Ibis Styles Araneta City =

Hotel in Quezon City, Philippines

Ibis Styles Manila Araneta City
- The Ibis Styles hotel, taken from the rooftop Sensory Garden area of the Gateway Mall 2

- Location within Philippines

General information
- Status: Completed
- Location: General Roxas Avenue, Araneta City, Cubao, Quezon City, Philippines
- Coordinates: 14°37′15.5″N 121°3′08.8″E
- Construction started: August 2018
- Topped-out: January 20, 2020
- Completed: May 2023
- Opened: March 7, 2024 (soft opening); September 1, 2024 (full opening); February 19, 2025 (grand opening)
- Cost: ₱2 billion
- Owner: Araneta Hotels Inc. (AHI)
- Operator: AccorHotels

Height
- Height: 84.86 m (278.4 ft)

Technical details
- Floor count: 22
- Floor area: 20,149 m^{2} (216,880 sq ft)

Design and construction
- Architecture firm: RTKL Associates, Palafox Associates and Aidea
- Developer: ACI, Inc.

Other information
- Number of rooms: 286
- Number of restaurants: 4
- Parking: 3 (underground)

Website
- www.ibisstyles-manilaaranetacity.com

The Ibis Styles Manila Araneta City (stylized as ibis Styles Manila Araneta City) is a 286-room 3-star hotel located in the Araneta City, Quezon City, Philippines. The economy hotel is part of AccorHotels, and is the first hotel under the Ibis Styles brand in the Philippines. Built and completed in May 2023, the hotel faced delays prior to its completion, which was initially planned to fully open in 2021. The hotel opened its doors to the public on 7 March 2024 and began its full operations in September 2024, before holding its official grand opening on 19 February 2025.

== History ==
The hotel during construction (November 2021)

The plans for the Ibis Styles hotel were laid out as early as 2014, as part of the Gateway Mall 2 complex, an expansion development of Gateway Mall, rising on the site of the former Gateway Food Park, where public outdoor events were once held. Following the successful opening of the Novotel Manila Araneta City in March 2016, Araneta Center Inc. (ACI, Inc.) announced in March 2018, that a second hotel would be built at the Araneta Center (now Araneta City). The second hotel was touted to be "a lifestyle budget hotel" run by "a popular international brand". Groundbreaking on the former Gateway Food Park started in August 2017, while the ceremonial groundbreaking for the Gateway Mall 2 including the adjacent Ibis Styles hotel took place in the same month on the following year, in August 2018. The Ibis Styles hotel, like Novotel Manila Araneta City, is also a hotel brand under AccorHotels under the Ibis Styles brand , and costed ₱1.5 billion to build, with Megawide Construction Corporation serving as the general contractor. The Araneta Group also appointed AMCOM & Company Inc. serving as the general consultant for the projects, along with the New Gateway Mall.

On January 20, 2020, the hotel was officially topped off, and is scheduled to begin partial operations in late 2020 with full operations projected by early 2021. However, due to the effects of the COVID-19 Pandemic in the country, the opening of the hotel, along with the adjacent New Gateway Mall was delayed, and the total price of the construction has inflated to ₱2 billion. Another factor in the reasons that the hotel's construction was delayed was due to a case filed between the Araneta City Inc. (ACI) of the Araneta Group and Megawide Construction Corporation, regarding costing issues in various projects, such as the Gateway Mall 2. Due to these developments, the Araneta Group hired Stages, Design and Construction (SDC) as the new general contractor for the finishing works of the complex. Design changes were also made within the hotel's original architectural design and interior facilities, such as the hotel's "wave-inspired" facade similar to the Gateway Mall 2 was later changed to a simpler facade and the hotel's convention spaces, which was initially planned to cater 6 function rooms, was later reduced to 5 function rooms.

The hotel began its soft opening on March 7, 2024, after being moved from November 2023, while the full grand opening of the hotel, alongside the Gateway Mall 2, was initially to take place within the second half of 2024. The hotel began its full operations on September 1, 2024, upon the completion and the opening of the Family Rooms in the hotel, before making its grand opening on February 19, 2024. The grand opening was attended by various guests and officials, such as Araneta Group Chairman, President, and CEO Jorge Araneta and other high officials from the Araneta Group, Accor Asia Pacific, and the Department of Tourism.

== Development and Location ==
The hotel is part of the Gateway Square complex, a 5-hectare (12-acre), 400,000 m^{2} (4,300,000 sq ft) prime mixed-use, transit-oriented superblock development within the Araneta City. The development features retail shops, offices, restaurants, leisure amenities, lodging spaces, and entertainment facilities, while having over 3,000 parking spaces, and is directly connected to other buildings via sky bridges and walk paths.

The hotel is located adjacent to the Gateway Mall and the Gateway Mall 2 along General Roxas Avenue, and stands at the north-western corner of the Araneta Coliseum. The hotel is also accessible to nearby malls such SM Cubao, the Farmers Plaza, and Ali Mall; the New Frontier Theater through the Gateway Link Bridge, the Manhattan Gardens condominiums, and the Araneta City Cyberpark towers. Transportation services also cater direct connections to the hotel's surrounding area via railway stations such as the MRT 3 Cubao Station on the west, the LRT 2 Cubao Station on the north, and other transport terminals, such as the Araneta City Bus Terminal and the Araneta City Busport, the Farmers Plaza UV Express terminal, and the Araneta City Jeepney Terminal.

== Architecture ==
The hotel was designed by RTKL Associates in collaboration with Sudhakar Thakurdesai, along with the help of local architectural firms Palafox Associates and Aidea. The building features a contemporary architecture, and is similarly designed to the Cyberpark Tower 1, located at the Araneta City Cyberpark, which features an asymmetrical facade with line strips. The hotel's exterior also included touches of brown hue varieties, as well as blue, green, red, yellow and white line strips matched within vertical fins that were installed within the white colored exteriors, which enhances the facade's aesthetic design.

The hotel's rooms and interior designs were based from the historical events in the Araneta Coliseum throughout its 60-year (1960–2020) history, such as a "stage-inspired" reception lobby utilizing stage equipment boxes for the reception desks and ceiling-installed stage lights. The hotel also features "boxing glove sofas" located within the hotel's ground floor lobby and main lobby, located at the 4th floor, which is inspired from the Thrilla in Manila, a historic boxing match held at the Araneta Coliseum between Muhammad Ali and Joe Frazier. The hotel also includes basic LEED green building initiatives, which is similar to the initiatives taken in the Gateway Mall 2.

== Features ==
The Ibis Styles Hotel Araneta City stands at 84.86 m (278.4 ft) tall, and is directly connected to the Gateway Mall 2 shopping mall through the hotel's fourth floor and three underground parking levels. The hotel has a total floor area of 38,000 m^{2} (410,000 sq ft), which includes a total of 286 rooms, and is divided with 22 guestrooms on each floor. The rooms of the hotel range into three different room layouts: namely the Standard Room with 2 Single Beds, Standard Room with Queen-size Bed, and a Family Room. Ibis Styles also houses a total of five different function rooms for various meetings and conferences, namely the Gassion, the Cardin, Bardot, Napoli, and the Guillem, which combines the Bardot, Napoli and Gassion meeting rooms.

The hotel also feature a lobby lounge at the ground floor; a main lobby at the fourth floor with direct connections to the Gateway Mall 2 and a co-working space with an all-day patisserie named the StrEats Coworking Cafe; a gym, and a roof deck swimming pool located along the topmost floor. The hotel also hosts three restaurants, namely the StrEats Buffet Restaurant, which features a blended variety of Asian and Italian Cuisines; the Le Bistro, a bistro cafe featuring French and Italian Cuisines; and The Edge Skyview Bar, a rooftop bar.
