= Farmers Plaza =

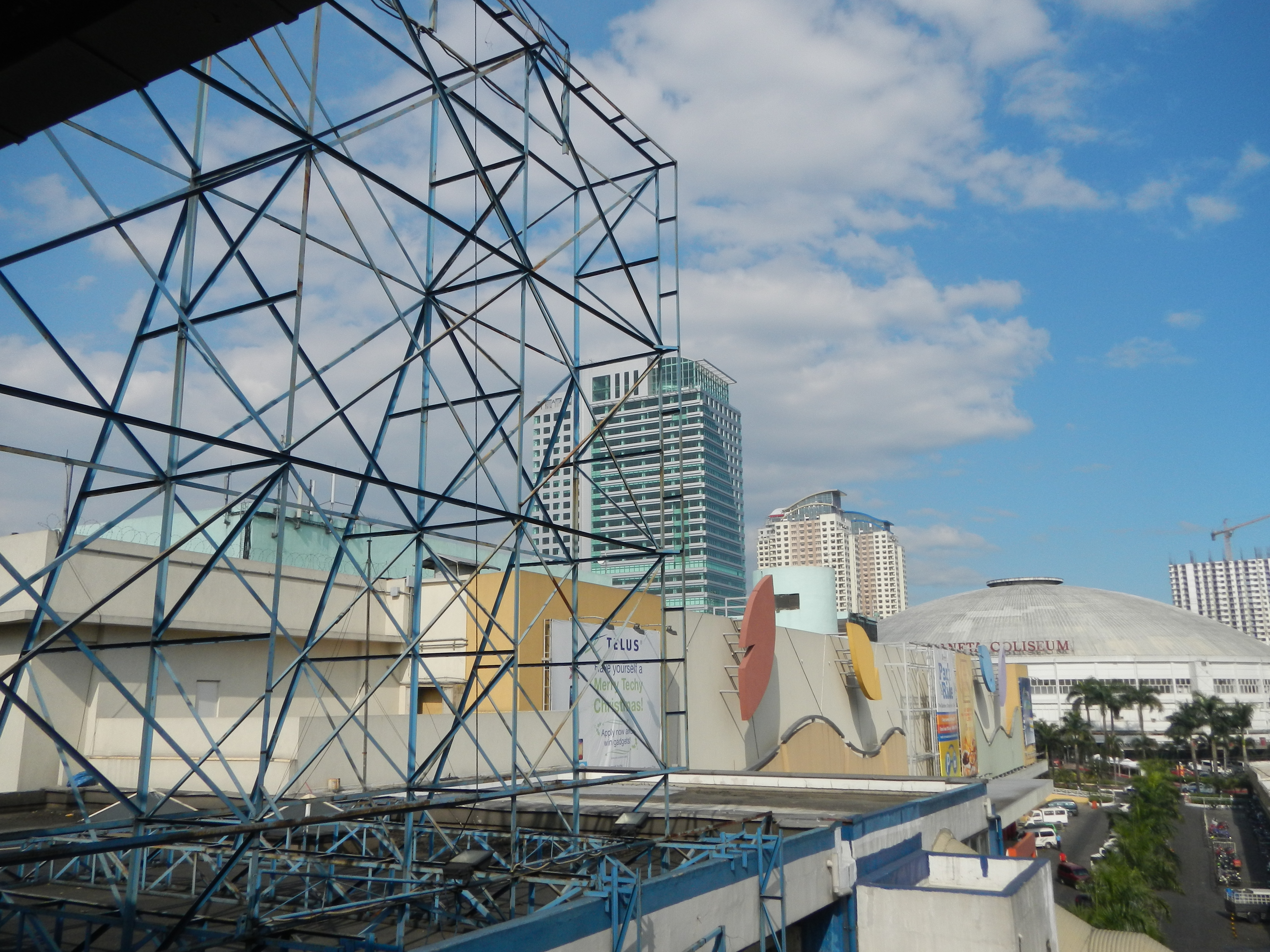
- A view of the Farmers Plaza at the foreground, with the Araneta Coliseum, the Gateway Tower and the Manhattan Gardens complex at the background, from the Araneta Center–Cubao MRT station (2014)
- Location: Araneta City, Cubao, Quezon City, Philippines
- Coordinates: 14°37′13″N 121°03′06″E
- Opened: 1969; 1986 (renovation after fire); 1991, 2001, 2014 (renovation)
- Previous names: Coliseum Farmers Market and Shopping Center (1969–1985); New Farmers Plaza Shopping Center (1985–1999)
- Developer: ACI, Inc.
- Manager: ACI, Inc.
- Owner: ACI, Inc.
- Architect: Antonio Sevilla Sindiong
- Num. of stores: 193 shops and restaurants (excluding shops at the Farmers Plaza Bazaar)
- Floor area: 60,400 m^{2} (650,000 sq ft)
- Floors: 5
- Parking: 100 slots (located along Central Avenue)
- Public transit: Araneta Center-Cubao; Araneta Center-Cubao; 51 53 Farmers Plaza; 61 Araneta City Bus Port; UBE Araneta City Bus Port; 1 Cubao; Future: E Cubao
- Website: Farmers Plaza

Farmers Plaza is a shopping mall located at the Araneta City in Cubao, Quezon City. Renovated and expanded in 1999 and in 2014, the five-level complex is the first ever fully first enclosed, air-conditioned mall in the Philippines, making it one of the oldest commercial buildings in the country. The mall is owned by the ACI, Inc. and offers 60,400 m^{2} (650,000 sq ft) of retail space, occupied mostly by various merchandise and lifestyle outlets.

== History ==
Originally named the "Coliseum Farmers Market and Shopping Center", the mall was constructed in 1968, and opened its doors in 1969, nine years after the opening of the Araneta Coliseum. The mall has four floors and was designed by Filipino architect Antonio Sevilla Sindiong. Sindiong, along with Fernando Hizon Ocampo (Sindiong/Ocampo), were also responsible for the architectural designs of Ali Mall, located along P. Tuazon Boulevard. The mall is known as the first air-conditioned mall in the country and hosted numerous commercial establishments, including the Farmers Market, as one of the original tenants of the building. The market occupied the building's lower ground floor since its opening, until in 1975, when the market was moved to its new site, located across the mall. Due to the mall's location to various entertainment facilities and department stores, the mall also complemented with various buildings such as Ali Mall, located two blocks away, and made Cubao a bustling shopping and entertainment hub throughout its time, and entered stiff competition to malls such as Harrison Plaza, the first mall in the country to include a department store within the building; Greenhills Shopping Center, and other shopping districts such as the Makati Central Business District and the areas of Binondo and Quiapo in Manila. The mall also once featured a 2-cinema cineplex in the 1980s as part of the expansion projects of the mall. The theater was later closed in the 1990s and was later repurposed for new retail shops and tenants.

In 1985, the mall encountered a fire that destroyed many parts of the building. Three years later, the mall was rebranded and renamed as the "New Farmers Plaza Shopping Center", also known as "New Farmers Plaza", after being delayed within the construction phase following the political uncertainties within the 1986 People Power Revolution and the coups made by Reform the Armed Forces Movement and Marcos Loyalists in the following months after the revolution. Due to this renovation, the mall's floor count was increased from four floors to five floors and later increased the mall's overall floor area. The mall also faced its second renovation project in 1990 and was completed in 1991. In early 1991, a stampede in Cinema 2 was caused by a 31-year-old shouting "fire" during a screening of My Pretty Baby, injuring 20 people.

Following the construction of the Araneta Center-Cubao MRT station located adjacent to the mall, the mall entered its third renovation in 1999 and was completed in 2001, where the western portions of the mall were renovated, and connect the mall to the adjacent MRT Station. The mall became the first property within the Araneta Center to be renovated as part of the Araneta Center Master Plan. The mall entered its fourth renovation project in 2012, and was completed in 2014, featuring a new and modernized facade and interiors, upgraded facilities and amenities, and enhanced security systems.

== Location and transportation ==
The mall is directly linked to the Line 3 Araneta Center-Cubao station, and is located along one of Metro Manila's busiest thoroughfare, EDSA. The mall is also directly connected to the Smart Araneta Coliseum, the Gateway Mall, the Gateway Tower, and the upcoming New Gateway Mall and the Ibis Styles Araneta City. The mall is also located close to the Araneta Center–Cubao LRT station, the New Frontier Theater, the Manhattan Gardens complex, the Araneta City Cyberpark, the Aurora Tower, the SM Cubao, and Ali Mall. The mall is also used as a terminal for UV Express vehicles. Buses bound for Antipolo are located along the Farmers Plaza Bus Stop, located below the MRT 3 Araneta Center-Cubao station concourse.

== Features ==
The mall consists of 5-levels and has 60,400 m^{2} (650,000 sq ft) of retail spaces, and is occupied by a mix of international and local shops; lifestyle, electronic, and merchandising shops; dining outlets and entertainment facilities. The mall also has 100 outdoor parking slots, and features 193 stores anchored by Robinsons Easymart (formerly Wellcome), Handyman, Mercury Drug, Bench, National Book Store, Penshoppe and other shops. The mall also features a Food Court (Food Plaza) and an activity area atrium, where public events, sales and concerts were held, both located at the Lower Ground Floor; and the Farmers Plaza Bazaar, an indoor bazaar, featuring fashion, electronics, and food stores, located at the 4th floor.

== Gallery ==
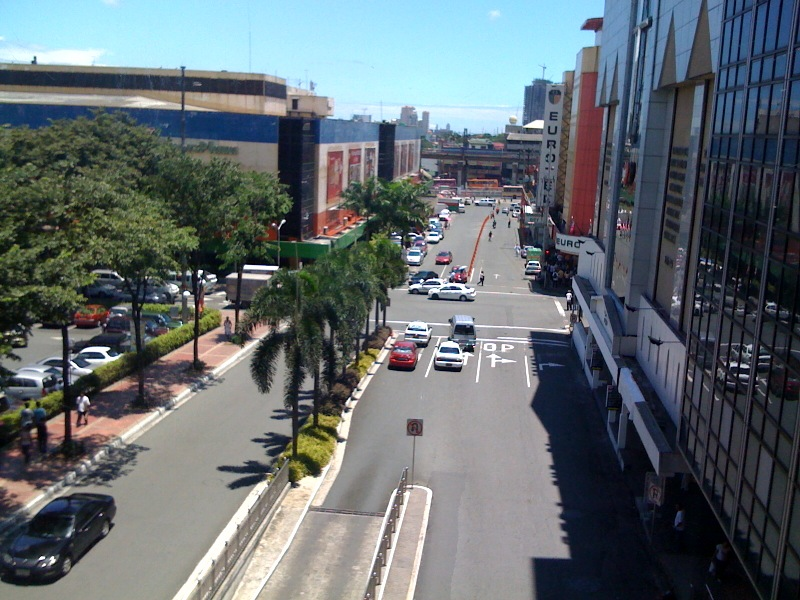
A view of the Farmers Plaza at the Gateway Mall (2009)

An overlooking view of the Farmers Plaza atrium (2021)
