= Megawide =

Philippine construction conglomerate

- Type: Public
- Traded as: PSE: MWIDE
- Industry: Construction
- Founded: 1997; 29 years ago
- Founders: Edgar Saavedra; Michael Cosiquien
- Headquarters: Quezon City, Philippines
- Key people: Edgar Saavedra (Chairman, President & CEO); Manuel Luis Ferrer (CBO, CAO & CIO); Denise Allysa Toroba (COO); Ramon Diaz (CFO)
- Products: Commercial and infrastructure developments
- Website: megawide.com.ph

Megawide Construction Corporation (PSE: MWIDE) is a Philippine conglomerate, founded in 1997 as a mid-size construction firm by civil engineers Edgar Saavedra and Michael Cosiquien in Quezon City, Philippines. In 2004, the company grew to incorporate assets in engineering, procurement, and construction (EPC), Airport Infrastructure, and Transport-oriented Development. It was listed in the Philippine Stock Exchange in 2011. It is a partner of the Philippine government in flagship infrastructure projects such as Mactan–Cebu International Airport (MCIA) (through a joint venture with Indian company GMR), the Parañaque Integrated Terminal Exchange (PITX), the PPP for School Infrastructure Project, and the Clark International Airport Passenger Terminal Building.

As of September 25, 2020, Megawide has a total market capitalization of P15 B and share price of P7.43.

== History ==
Megawide was established in 1997 as a mid-sized construction firm by engineers Edgar Saavedra and Michael Cosiquien a year after their graduation from De La Salle University. The company incorporated in 2004 to engage in general construction which involves site development, earthworks, structural and civil works, masonry works, architectural finishes, electrical works, plumbing and sanitary works, fire protection works and mechanical works.

In 2007, Megawide received its Triple A License from Philippine Contractors Accreditation Board (PCAB). It also won two of that year’s largest construction contracts, The Berkeley Residences and Grass Tower 1 of SM Development Corporation.

Megawide Construction Corporation went public on February 18, 2011 with an initial public offering price of P7.84 per share. It was the first company to go public in 2011 and is traded under the stock symbol MWIDE. The IPO ran from February 7 to 11 and was able to raise nearly P2.3 billion in fresh funds for the company. The IPO was part of Megawide’s strategy to diversify its client base and undertake public-private partnership projects with the Philippine Government, using the funds for the construction of its precast concrete plant in Taytay, Rizal.

On March 1, 2018, Megawide Construction Corporation and its India-based consortium partner GMR Infrastructure, the consortium which revamped Mactan–Cebu International Airport, have submitted a ₱150 billion, or US$3 billion, proposal to decongest and redevelop Ninoy Aquino International Airport.

== Subsidiaries ==
Engineering Procurement and Construction

- Megawide Construction Equipment, Logistics and Services (CELS)
- Megawide Construction
- Megawide International Ltd.

Power

- Citicore Holdings Investments, Inc.
  - Citicore Power Inc.
- Megawatt Clean Energy, Inc. (MCEI)
- Silay Solar Power, Inc

Transport

- GMR-Megawide Cebu Airport Corporation
  - Mactan–Cebu International Airport
- MWM Terminals, Inc.
  - Parañaque Integrated Terminal Exchange
- Megawide Terminals, Inc

Real Estate

- Altria East Land, Inc.
- Megawide Land, Inc

Retail

- Globemerchants, Inc

== Projects ==
=== Finished ===
- Azotea de Bel-Air by Alfonso-Saquitan Realty Corporation
- Residencia de Regina by Banff Realty and Development Corporation
- Hampton Gardens Tower E by Dynamic Realty and Resources Corporation
- Chateau Valenzuela by Globe Asiatique Realty Holdings Corporation
- Millenia Tower by Goldland Properties and Development Corporation
- Sure Shot Sports Complex by Hyco Laboratories Company, Inc.
- City Square Residences by Kepelland Realty, Inc.
- Malate Crown Plaza by Malate Royale Development Corporation
- University Tower by Prince Jun Development Corporation
- Bellevue Executive Tower by RPJ Development Corporation

=== On-Going ===
- Antel Spa Residences Tower 1 by Antel Land Holdings, Inc.
- Belle Casino by Belle Resources Corporation
- Malate Bayview Mansion by Malate Bayview Mansion Dev't Corp.
- Megawide Tower by Megawide Construction Corp.
- University Tower Malate (University Tower 3) by Prince Jun Property Holdings, Inc.
- Sea Residences by SM Development Corporation.
- B-Hotel by Stalwart Realty
- Bench Office by Suyen Corporation
- North–South Commuter Railway (NSCR) Malolos–San Simon segment
- Metro Manila Subway (MMS) Ortigas and Shaw stations
