= Farmers Market (Cubao) =

Wet market in Quezon City, Philippines

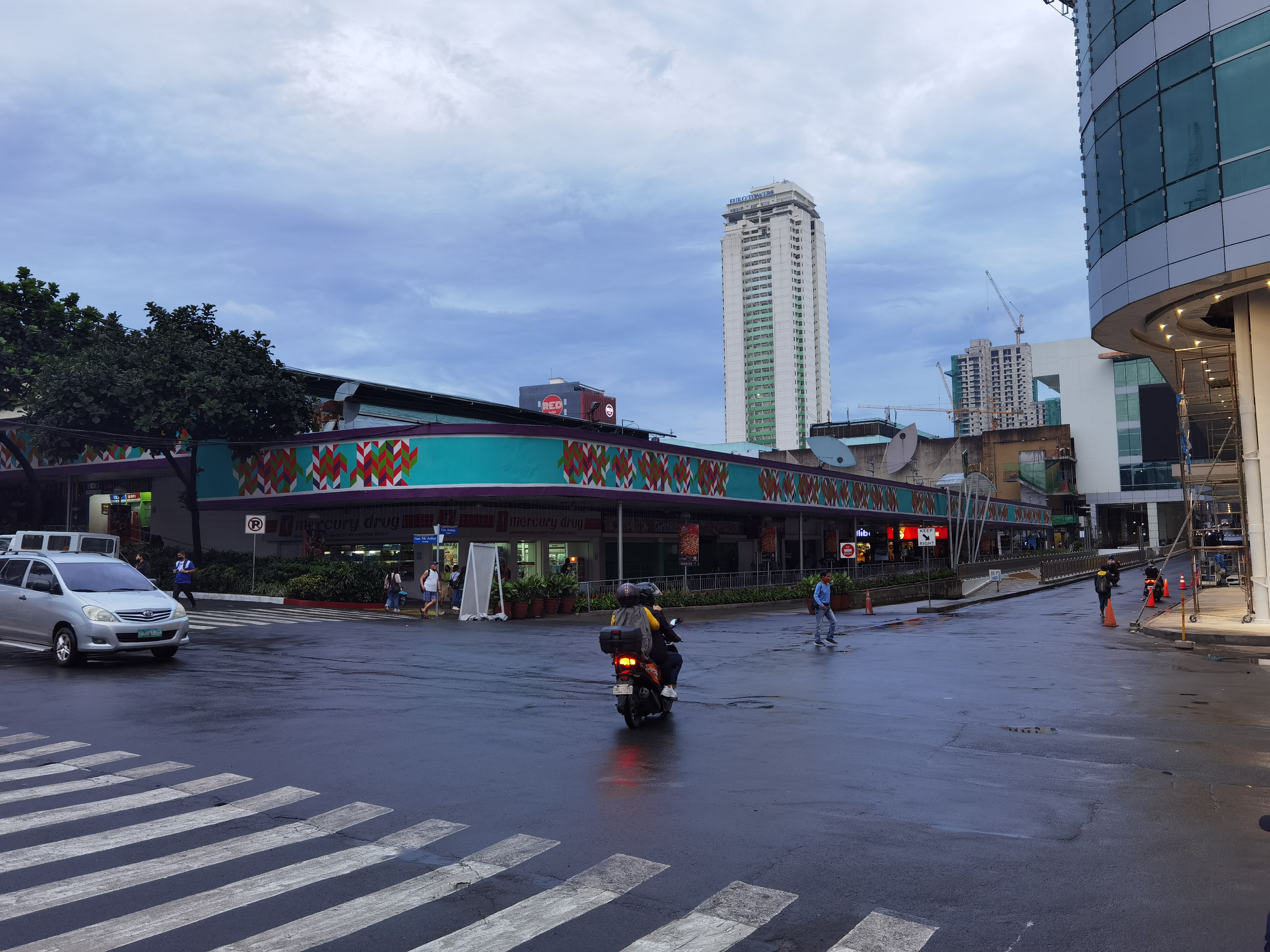
- The Farmers Market at dawn, with portions of Gateway Mall 2 in the foreground and Farmers Plaza in the background, January 2023.
- Interactive map of the Farmers Market area

General information
- Location: Araneta City, Quezon City, Philippines
- Coordinates: 14°37′09″N 121°03′09″E
- Current tenants: over 50 tenants
- Construction started: 1974; 52 years ago
- Estimated completion: Early 1975; 51 years ago
- Opened: 1975; 51 years ago
- Owner: ACI, Inc.

Technical details
- Floor count: 1
- Floor area: 12,000 m^{2} (130,000 sq ft)

Other information
- Parking: 100 slots (located along Central Avenue)

The Farmers Market is a wet market located at the Araneta City in Cubao, Quezon City. Standing along General Araneta Avenue, the market was opened in 1975 and serves as one of the best, oldest, and largest fresh produce markets both in Metro Manila and in the country. The market is owned by the ACI, Inc., and is monitored by the Quezon City Government.

== History ==
In 1969, the Coliseum Farmers Market and Shopping Center was opened to the public, and was the first mall to open within the Araneta Center complex, now named as the Araneta City. During its opening, the market serves as one of the first tenants to occupy the mall, and once occupied the entire lower ground floor of the mall until 1975, before moving into its present location located across the mall. Plans were laid out for a separate market building across the Farmers Plaza in the early 1970s, until the construction of the market began in 1974. The present Farmers Market building was completed in 1975. Through the years, the market was also featured by numerous chefs, food critics, TV personalities, and local government officials, such as Anthony Bourdain, Rick Bayless, Margarita Forés, and Gordon Ramsay.

== Location ==
The market is located within Epifanio de los Santos Avenue (EDSA), and across the Farmers Plaza and the MRT-3 station in the north. The market is also located near commercial buildings, malls, shopping areas, entertainment venues, hotels, office towers, residential condominiums and transport hubs such as the Vivaldi Residences Cubao in the north; the Gateway Mall, the Gateway Tower, the New Frontier Theater, the Aurora Tower, the LRT-2 station and the Manhattan Parkway and Parkview towers of the Manhattan Gardens complex in the northeast; the Smart Araneta Coliseum, Novotel Manila Araneta City, Shopwise Hypermarket and the Manhattan Plaza in the east; the Araneta City Cyberpark, SM Cubao, Ali Mall and the Manhattan Heights in the southeast; and the Farmers Garden in the south.

== Features ==
The market has a total floor area of 12,000 m^{2} (130,000 sq ft) and is occupied by over 50 tenants. The market features a variety of local shops that primarily sells fresh products, ranging from fishes, meat, and fruits and vegetables, and also features the Fishmoko section, a fish market highlighting live fish stored in freshwater tanks, and the Dampa sa Farmers Market (Dampa at the Farmers Market), a food court offering fresh foods and freshly cooked meals from the market stalls. The market is also occupied by various merchandise shops, a barbershop, a hair salon, bakeries, fast-food chains, and a Mercury Drug drugstore.

Due to the effects of the COVID-19 pandemic in the country, the market also accepts online transactions and payments in order to promote cashless payments, while enforcing strict safety protocols and standards.

== Awards ==
The market was awarded numerous times by various organizations, including the Quezon City Government, where the market is included in the city's Cleanest Market Hall of Fame. On 2023, the Dampa sa Farmers Market was placed as one of the most recommended restaurants by Restaurant Guru, an online restaurant review and guide website.

== Gallery ==
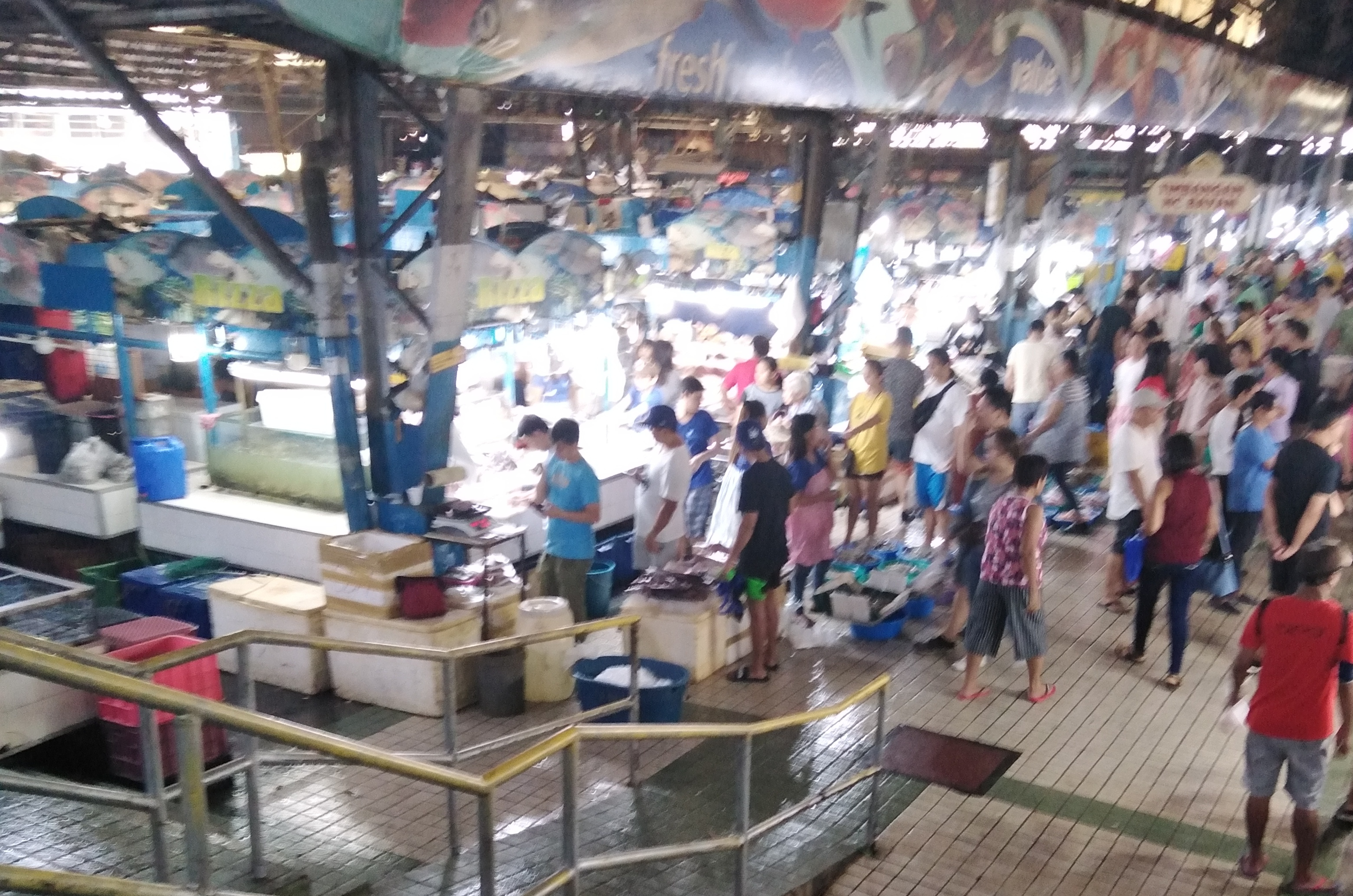
Stalls inside the Farmer's Market

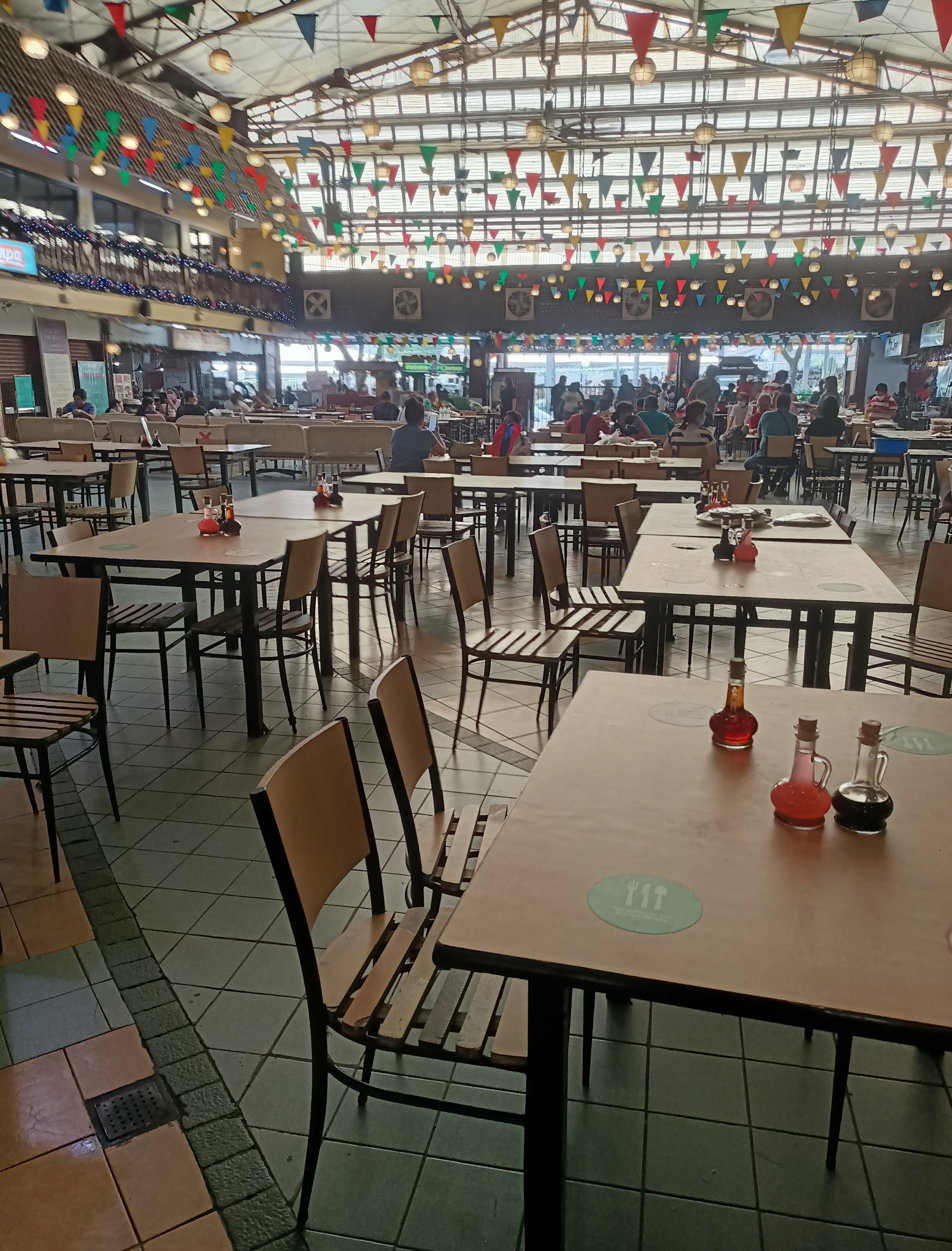
The Dampa Food court

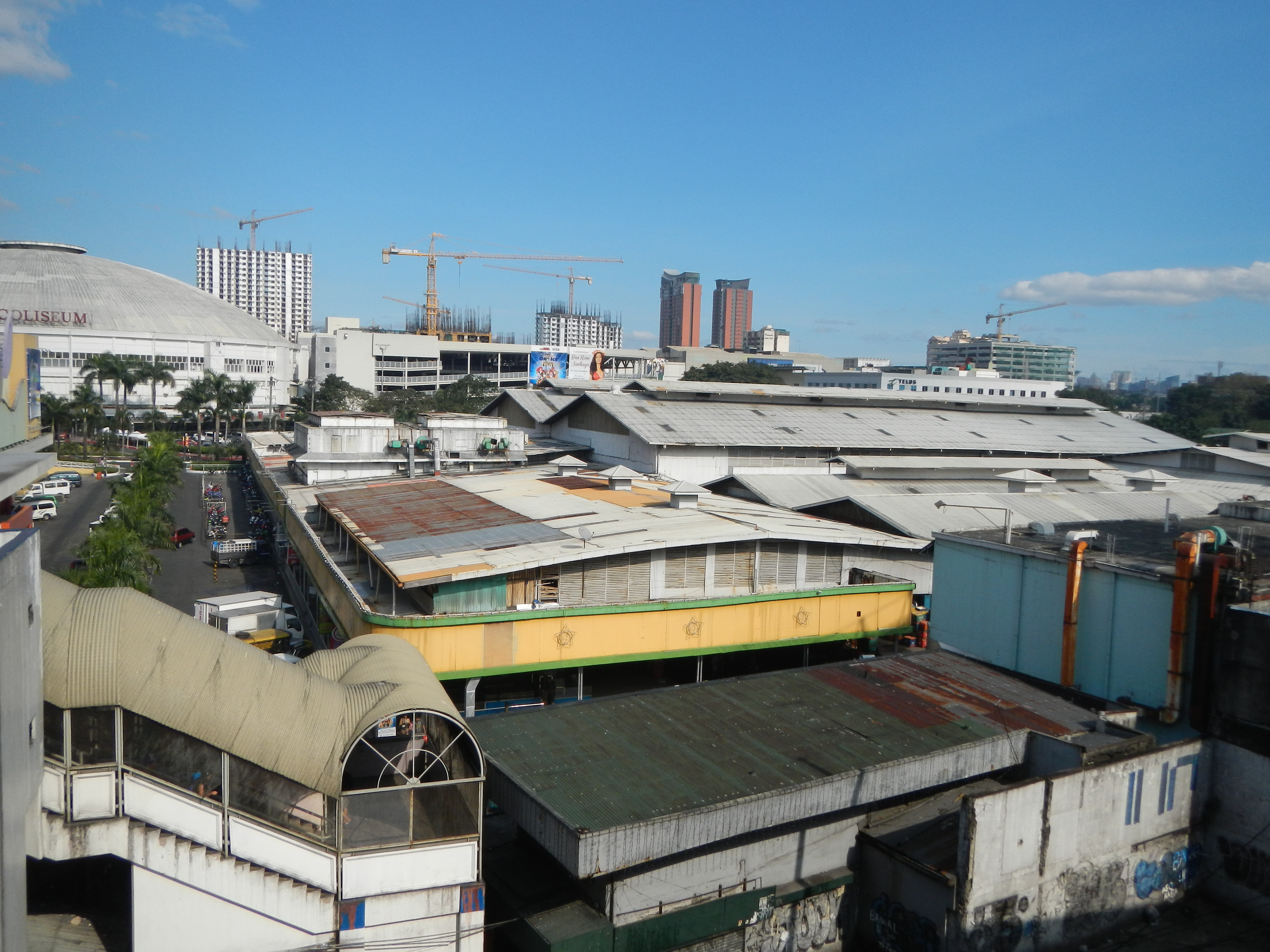
A view of the Farmers Market at the foreground from the Araneta Center–Cubao MRT station (2014)
