= Araneta City =

Central business district in Quezon City, Metro Manila, Philippines

- Logo since September 2019.

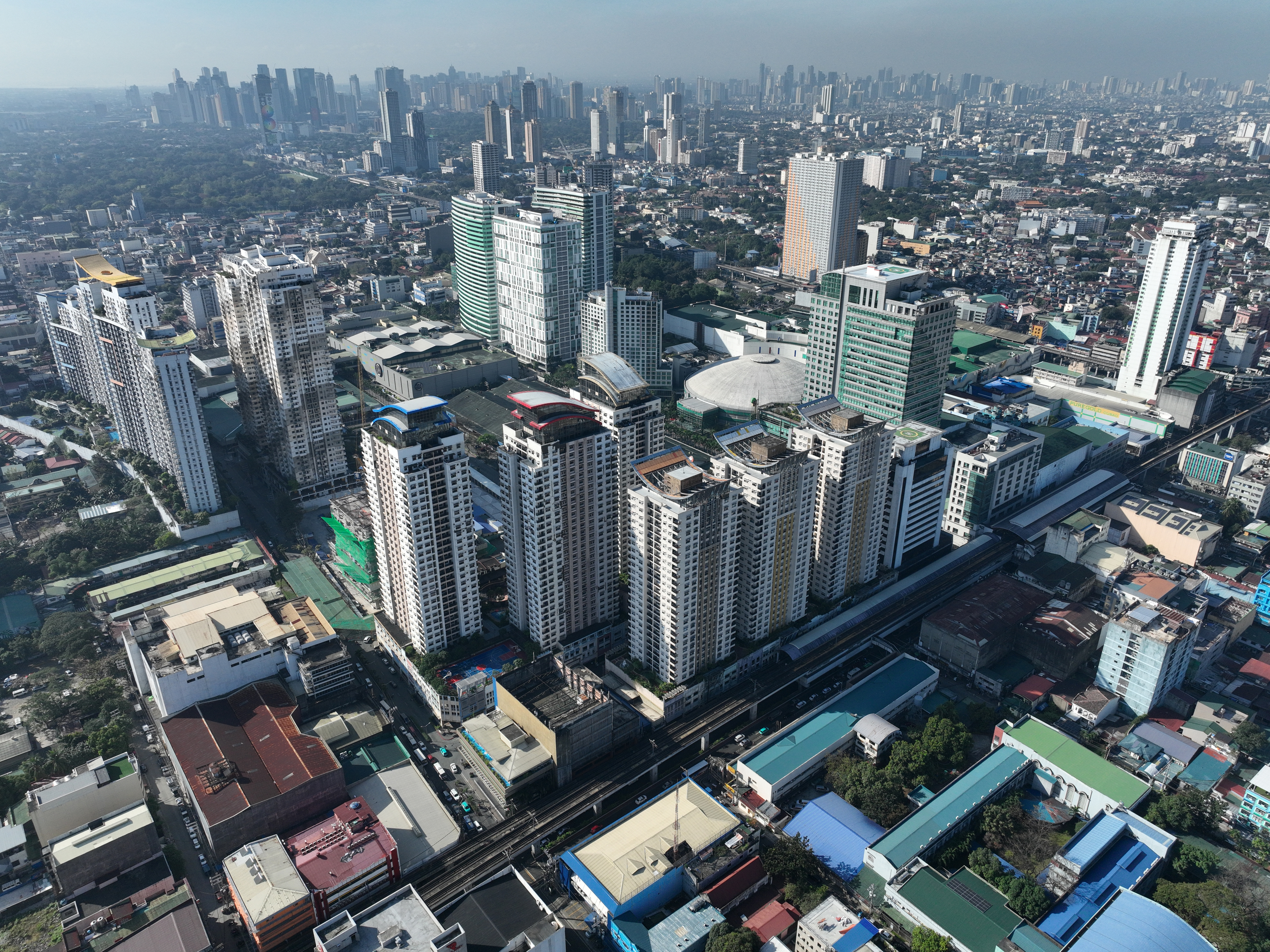
- Drone shot of Araneta City in 2026

Project
- Completed: 2030; 4 years' time
- Opening date: 1960; 66 years ago
- Developer: ACI, Inc.
- Architect: General Site Master Plan, Gateway Mall 1, Novotel Manila Araneta City, Gateway Tower, Manhattan Gardens: RTKL Associates and Palafox Associates; Araneta City Cyberpark only: ASYA Design; Gateway Mall 2 and Ibis Styles Araneta City only: Aidea
- Operator: ACI, Inc.
- Owner: ACI, Inc.
- Website: aranetacity.com

Physical features
- Transport: Araneta Center-Cubao; Araneta Center-Cubao; E Main Avenue; 51 53 61 Farmers Plaza; UBE Araneta City Bus Port; 1 Cubao; Future: E Cubao

Location
- Location in Metro Manila, Philippines
- Coordinates: 14.6207°N 121.0532°E
- Country: Philippines
- Location: Socorro, Cubao, Quezon City, Metro Manila, Philippines

Area
  - Total: 35 ha (86 acres)

Araneta City (stylized in all lowercase), formerly and still commonly known as Araneta Center, is a 35-hectare (86-acre) transit oriented, commercial mixed-use urban development in Quezon City, Philippines. Situated in Barangay Socorro in Cubao, and at the intersection of two major roads, Epifanio de los Santos Avenue (EDSA) and Aurora Boulevard, the area offers a mixture of retail, dining, entertainment, residential, office, lodging and parking facilities throughout the complex and hosts over 1 million people daily, due to its close proximity residential areas and transport terminals, including the railway stations of the MRT Line 3 and the LRT Line 2 stations.

Located within the complex are key structures such as the Gateway Malls, the Araneta Coliseum, the New Frontier Theater, Ali Mall, Farmers Market, and Farmers Plaza. The entire complex is owned by ACI, Inc., a subsidiary of the Araneta Group, who also serves as the developer and manager of the commercial area. ACI, Inc. is also currently in charge of spearheading the complex's redevelopment master plan after years of delays and issues, which aims to transform the area into a "garden city", and will consist of additional office, residential and mixed-use buildings, shopping malls, and other high-rise facilities within the complex. RTKL Associates and Palafox Associates designed the redevelopment master plan of the complex and was launched in 2002 for the construction of the Gateway Mall 1 and led rise to renovation projects of the complex's entertainment venues and malls, and the construction of other newer properties throughout the area under the first phase, such as the residential towers, office towers, hotels, and the expansion project of the Gateway Mall named the Gateway Mall 2.

Newer developments are also set to rise and begin construction within the next few years as part of the second phase of the redevelopment master plan. The redevelopment plan for the complex is set to be completed within 2030.

== History ==
Logo of the Araneta City as Araneta Center.

=== Early history ===
The 35 hectares (86 acres) property where the Araneta City, formerly named Araneta Center, is located in Quezon City, and was purchased by J. Amado Araneta in 1952, after the family's mansion in Taft Avenue, Manila was destroyed during the Battle of Manila in 1945. The land stood on bedrock, and has an elevation level of 43 meters, which is the highest point of the Metro Manila, located between Highway 54 (now Epifanio de los Santos Avenue), Aurora Boulevard, and P. Tuazon Boulevard; and along Gen. Romulo Avenue. As of 1959, the area was remote and located in an area designated for suburban mass housing and frequented by Hukbalahap rebels. The original owner of the property was the Radio Corporation of America (RCA).

=== Development ===
In 1953, Araneta initially only purchased 4 hectares (9.9 acres) of land from RCA, where he built his residence, which would become known as the "Bahay na Puti" (White House). It was in 1955 that Araneta purchased the remaining 31 hectares (77 acres) from the RCA. After purchasing the land, Araneta envisioned the area as a potential mixed-use area.

In 1956, Araneta sold a portion of the property to the Philippine National Bank which proceeded to set up a branch in the area. On the same year, the first Aguinaldo Department Store, a well-known retailer established its first branch beyond Manila. Araneta's Progressive Development Corporation (PDC) relocated its offices from Plaza Cervantes in Binondo, Manila to the Araneta Enterprise Building along Aurora Avenue. PDC would be later tasked to develop the Araneta Coliseum.

In the following years after the opening of the Araneta Coliseum in 1960, rapid development took place in the area. From the 1960s until the 1980s, there was a construction boom around the complex, and the area became a bustling entertainment and leisure hub, with the creation of the first strip mall in the country composed of 147 stores, located along Aurora Boulevard, and the creation of Ali Mall, SM Cubao, Fiesta Carnival (later the site of a Shopwise hypermarket), Plaza Fair, New Frontier Theater, Rustan's Superstore, National Book Store Superbranch, COD Department Store, Matsuzakaya Department Store and Matsuzakaya House, Uniwide Cubao, Farmers Plaza, Farmer's Market, and the Aurora Tower. The developments around the complex caused the area to prosper over the years and competed with other business districts in the Metro, such as Manila, the Makati Central Business District, the Greenhills Center, and the Ortigas Center.

The Araneta City and the surrounding areas also served as the home of many movie theaters such as the Nation Cinerama, Quezon Theater, Cinema 21, Sampaguita Theater, ACT Theater, Ocean Theater, Diamond Theater, Remar Theater, Alta Cinema, and Coronet Theater, all of which were constructed and completed between the years 1969–1974. Many of these establishments however have been closed by the end of the 1990s, with the buildings either repurposed for commercial purposes or demolished to give way to future developments due to the introduction of the home entertainment systems, supported with the rising usage of compact discs from the 1990s to the 2000s, and the creation of in-house movie theaters inside the shopping malls in the Metro that led to lesser patronage to these movie theaters.

The complex began losing steam during the late 1980s and encountered numerous problems within its properties, from the Farmers Plaza fire to the coups against the Presidency of Corazon Aquino, the Araneta Group also faced numerous uncertainties and rising competition from newer mixed-use developments with more advantageous locations within Manila and Ninoy Aquino International Airport. The following problems created an urban decay within the area, a capital slump within the Araneta Group's finances, and neglect on their buildings, causing rising crime rates and low business opportunities, prompting the Araneta group to temporarily use their capital to maintain the properties within the area, and halt their future plans and proposals to upgrade the area's potential and other big-scale redevelopment plans within the area. One noted planned development is the "Manhattan Tower" project, a mixed-use, high-rise development with retail and residential facilities. The problem also caused the Araneta Group to strengthen its key subsidiaries to finance the company's future projects.

=== Redevelopment ===
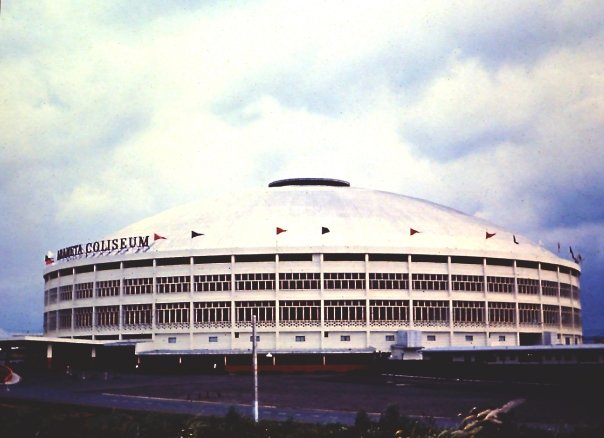
The Araneta Coliseum in the 1960s.

During the construction of the MRT Line 3 along Epifanio de los Santos Avenue (EDSA) in 1996, the Araneta Group saw the potential opportunity to revamp the complex and proposed plans to once again begin its redevelopment plans and push the company's plans for long-term development. The redevelopment dream was further titillated in the aftermath of the construction of the LRT Line 2 a year later, and prompted J. Amado's son, Jorge L. Araneta to launch a multi-phase master plan to reinvigorate their long-waited vision. In January 1997, plans were also laid out to create a joint venture partnership with Ayala Land and Atok-Big Wedge Co. to push for the area's revival and redevelopment, which is expected to be worth ₱140 billion ($5.32 billion). After a series of negotiations, and along the uncertainties caused by the 1997 Asian financial crisis, the Araneta Group decided to drop the proposal in order to push their own redevelopment plan using the company's own finances assisted by various bank loans.

With the ambition of regaining its former glory, a 20-year redevelopment project, known as the Araneta Center Master Plan, was formulated in 1999 and was unveiled in 2000, with an estimated budget of over ₱80 billion ($1.62 billion), and began its implementation in 1999 with the renovation of the Araneta Coliseum and the Farmers Plaza, which was completed in 2001. The redevelopment master plan is envisioned to turn the complex into an inter-connected, transit oriented "Garden City" concept, promoting connectivity, green architecture and open spaces within its buildings. Araneta also hired the international architectural firm RTKL Associates, along with local architectural firm Palafox Associates, owned by Felino Palafox for designing the redevelopment master plan and the first properties set to rise within the complex. Araneta also tapped Deshazo Starek and Tang (now Deshazo Group), Jones Lang LaSalle Incorporated and Colliers International to serve as the main consultants of the master plan. The plans for the master plan include additional malls, towers and renovated facilities within the complex, including the "Millennium Mall" project, a planned 7-storey mall which is interconnected to the Araneta Coliseum, the "Manila Tower", a 300 m (984.3 ft) planned mixed-use tower with communications facilities, and the modernization of the complex's entertainment venues, the Araneta Coliseum and the New Frontier Theater. The redevelopment is also envisioned to have a 972,000 m^{2} (10,460,000 sq ft) of total retail floor area.

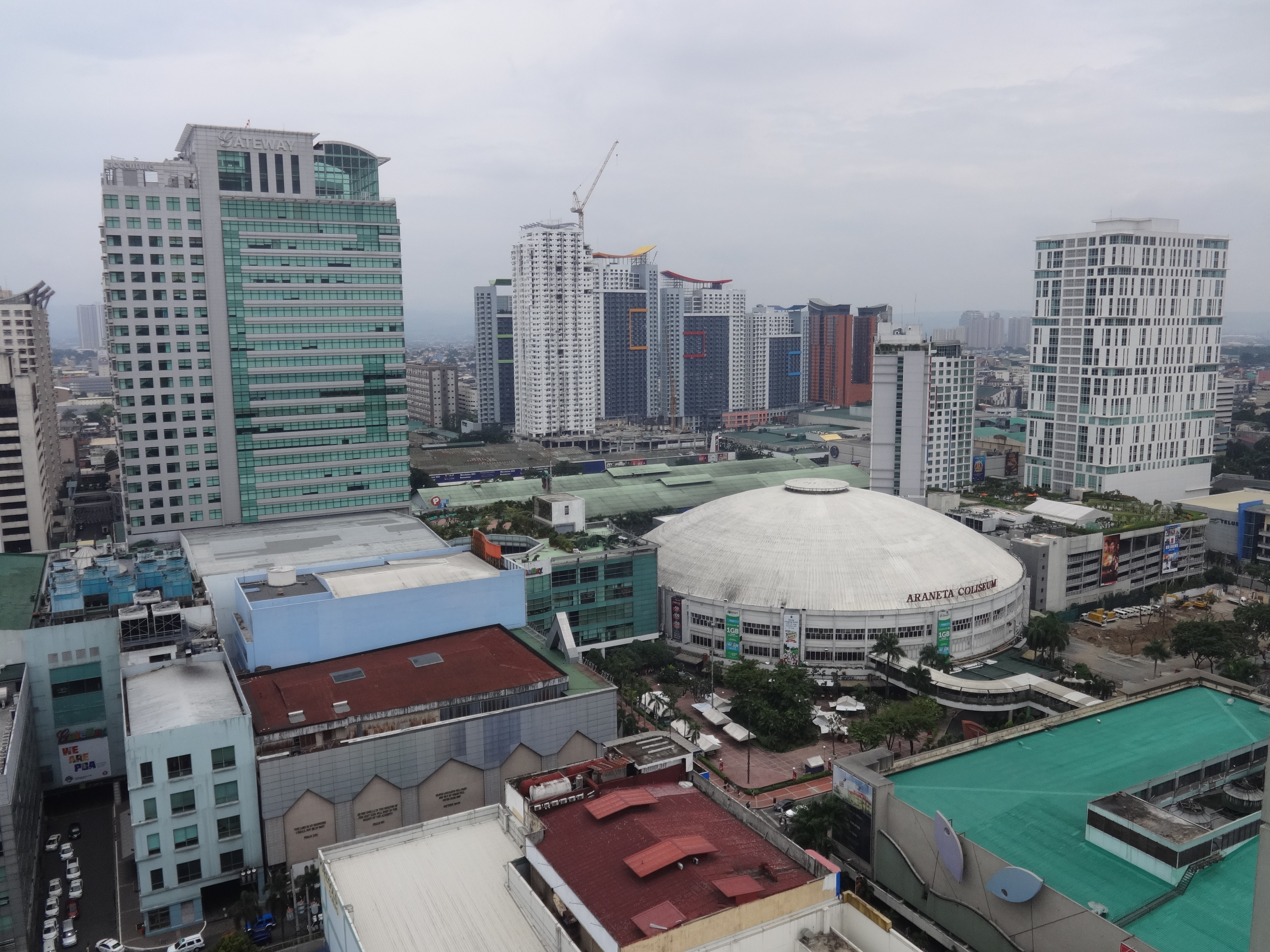
The Araneta City Skyline, taken from the Vivaldi Residences Cubao (2018)

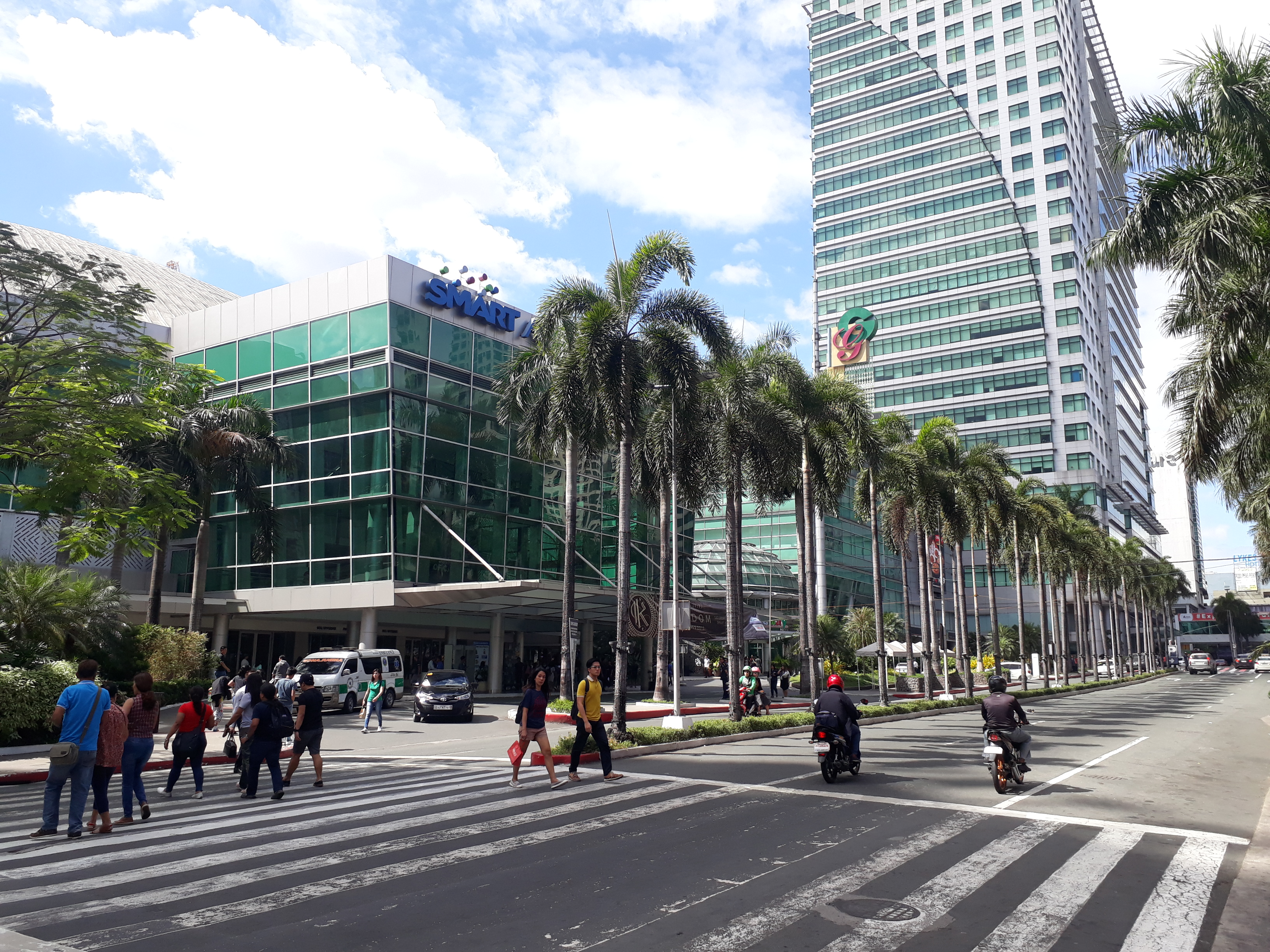
The Araneta Coliseum (foreground) and Gateway Complex (background) in Araneta City

The first phase of the redevelopment plan was expected to cost over ₱30 billion ($608 million) and began its implementation in 2002 with the construction of the Gateway Mall, completed in 2004, which was followed by the construction of the Gateway Office in 2005, a major renovation of the Araneta Coliseum, as well as the rehabilitation of the New Frontier Theater, which were completed in 2014 and 2015, respectively. Also included in the redevelopment project is the renovations of Ali Mall and SM Cubao in 2010, Shopwise in 2012, and the Farmers Plaza in 2014, as well as the construction of the first 12 towers of the Manhattan Gardens complex, the Gateway Tower, and the Novotel Manila Araneta City. The Araneta Group also tapped ASYA Design for designing the master plan and the architectural design the Araneta City Cyberpark Towers 1 and 2 and the entire Cyberpark complex, with both towers being completed in 2016 and 2018, respectively. The first phase of the redevelopment master plan was completed on 2024, with the completion of the Manhattan Plaza Tower 2 and opening of the Gateway Mall 2, which serves as the Gateway Mall's expansion project, and the Ibis Styles Araneta City, wherein both properties were designed by local architectural firm Aidea.

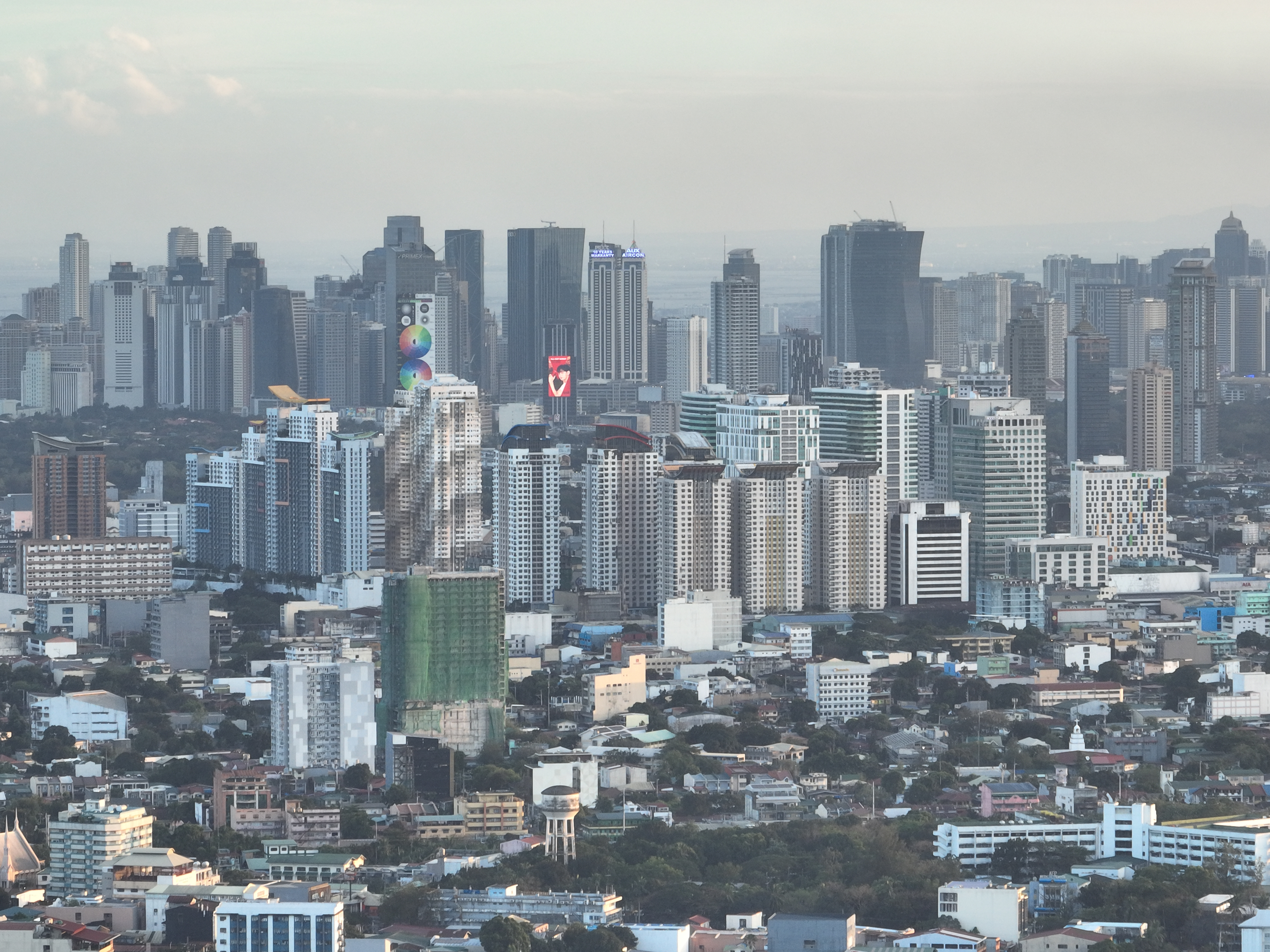
A drone shot of the Araneta City and the surrounding buildings within the Cubao District, with building of the Ortigas Center, the Greenfield District, and the Bonifacio Global City at the background

The second phase, which is set to cost over ₱50 billion ($1.01 billion) is set to begin in the next few years, and will include the development of 3 additional Cyberpark Towers; 6 additional Manhattan Gardens Towers, which included the Laurent Park; and the Gateway Mall 3. The phase will also include the construction of the City Plaza, a 2 hectares (4.9 acres) mixed-use development, and the Icon Tower, a planned 40+ storey tower, connected from the Manhattan Plaza. The master plan will also include a multi-billion dollar, 8 hectares (20 acres) Integrated resort complex consisting hotels, dining, entertainment, gaming, conventions and conferences, luxurious retail shops, and a modernised Farmer's Market, spanning from the Farmer's Market and its surrounding buildings, up to the Farmer's Garden area. Additional plans were also laid out within the complex, such as the planned construction of a heritage area located at the Araneta White House complex and a planned expansion of Ali Mall, which includes a 4-tower mixed-use development located along the northern area of the mall. The overall redevelopment master-plan covers 3,000,000 m^{2} (32,000,000 sq ft) square meters of gross floor area and are set within the target completion date of 2030, as part of the company's Vision 2030 plan within the area. On September 24, 2019, the Araneta Center was renamed as Araneta City after a brand relaunch, which is primarily connected to the complex's continuous developments through the years while reflecting its historic "firsts" and cultural heritage within the country.

== Facilities and tenants ==
=== Shopping and leisure ===
The Araneta City hosts over 2,100 shopping, dining and leisure establishments throughout the complex, which has a total floor area of 1,100,000 m^{2} (12,000,000 sq ft) of shops and dining choices, notably included are the tenants that are located in key malls such as Ali Mall, Farmers Plaza, and the Gateway Malls, as well as in SM Araneta City and Farmer's Market, which has a combined retail space of 438,900 m^{2} (4,724,000 sq ft). Other tenants are apparently located on the retail levels of the Aurora Tower, the Manhattan Gardens condominium complex, the Cyberpark Towers, and on other commercial buildings.

==== Gateway Mall ====
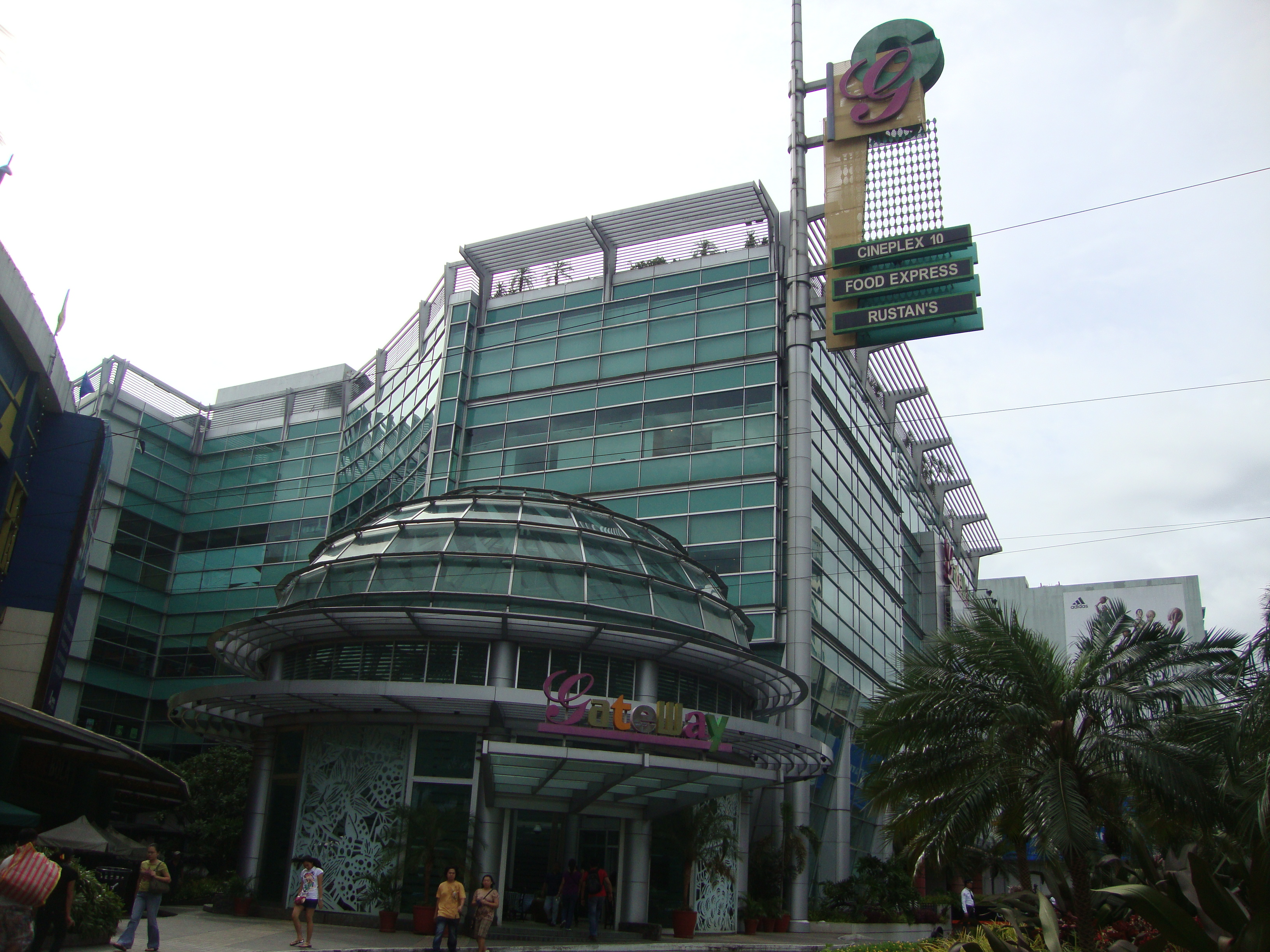
Gateway Mall

The Gateway Mall is a 6-storey mall located within General Aguinaldo Avenue and serves as the complex's flagship mall. The mall has 300,000 m^{2} (3,200,000 sq ft) of floor area and houses local and international brands such as Rustan's, H&M, Uniqlo, Automatic Centre Digital Plaza, and various lifestyle shops, tech shops, food kiosks, and restaurants. The mall was designed by RTKL Associates in partnership with Felino Palafox of Palafox Associates and received various acclaims of different organizations, as the mall was named the shopping mall as the Shopping Center of the Year for two consecutive years in 2006 and 2007 by the Philippine Retailers Association, a Merit Awardee at the International Council of Shopping Centers (ICSC) 30th Innovative Design and Development Awards, and a finalist at the 2008 Urban Land Institute Awards for Excellence.

In September 2023, the Gateway Mall completed and unveiled its 8-storey expansion project known as the Gateway Mall 2, and has 200,000 m^{2} (2,200,000 sq ft) of total floor area. The expansion also features roughly 400 retail shops, 100 restaurants, a modernized Shopwise Supermarket, an activity area atrium with the Quantum Skyview LED installation, a "Tropical themed" Lagoon Restaurant Collection, a 18-cinema cineplex, the World Kitchens food hall, a bowling center, a sensory garden, and a "Mitre" inspired 1,000-seater Sagrada Familia Church.

==== Ali Mall ====
Ali Mall

The Ali Mall is a four-storey mall located within the corner lot of P. Tuazon Boulevard, and General Romulo Avenue, Ali Mall served as the first integrated mall in the country, following its opening in 1976. Named after Muhammad Ali in the aftermath of his fight against Joe Frazier in the Thrilla in Manila, held at the Araneta Coliseum. The mall has 64,500 square meters (694,000 sq ft) of floor area and is occupied by local shops, restaurants, and government facilities.

==== Farmers Plaza ====
The Farmers Plaza is a 5-storey mall located along EDSA. Completed in 1969, the mall served as the first mall in the country and formerly house the Farmers Market until 1976. The mall has a total floor area of 60,400 m^{2} (650,000 sq ft) and is occupied by various merchandise, electronics, clothing and lifestyle stores, and a Bazaar, known as the Farmers Plaza Bazaar at the topmost floor.

==== Farmers Market ====
The Farmers Market is a wet market located adjacent to the Farmers Plaza. Opened in 1976 after occupying the basement area of the Farmers Plaza, the market has 12,000 m^{2} (130,000 sq ft) of market space and offers fresh produces in the country.

==== National Bookstore Superbranch ====
The National Book Store Superbranch in Cubao, which is also known as the National Book Store Outlet Store, serves as one of the largest branches of the office-supplies store chain in the Philippines. The bookstore first became a single-floor building in 1972, before being upgraded into a 9-storey building in 1982, designed by Rogelio Garcia Villarosa. The bookstore branch also serves as one of the primary warehouses of books within Metro Manila, and for the company's online shopping operations.

==== SM Araneta City ====
The SM Araneta City, formerly named SM Cubao, is a mall located along P. Tuazon Boulevard and serves as one of the first shopping centers by SM Retail. Groundbreaking for the construction of the mall began in October 1978, and was completed in 1980. The mall has 102,000 m^{2} (1,100,000 sq ft) of space and it is the largest department store building of SM Store in the country, occupying the mall's first 3 floors and has a floor area of 85,000 m^{2} (910,000 sq ft), which also presents the SM Supermarket and the Cyberzone. The building also entered renovation in June 2009 and was completed in January 2010, which featured a modernized facade design pattered with stripes within the grey and white colored exteriors, upgraded interiors such as the upgraded atriums with a "shower-like" LED lights display and a striped interior design, expanded floor space, and a skybridge along Times Square Avenue, linking the building to Ali Mall. Another skybridge was unveiled in February 2019, which is directly connected to the Cyberpark Tower One, located along General Aguinaldo Avenue. On 3 October 2022, the building was renamed as SM Araneta City, after an agreement was made between the Araneta Group and SM Retail to rename the building. In December 2024, solar panels were installed in the mall's rooftop area, while additional solar panel units are set to be installed within early 2025.

==== Fiesta Carnival ====
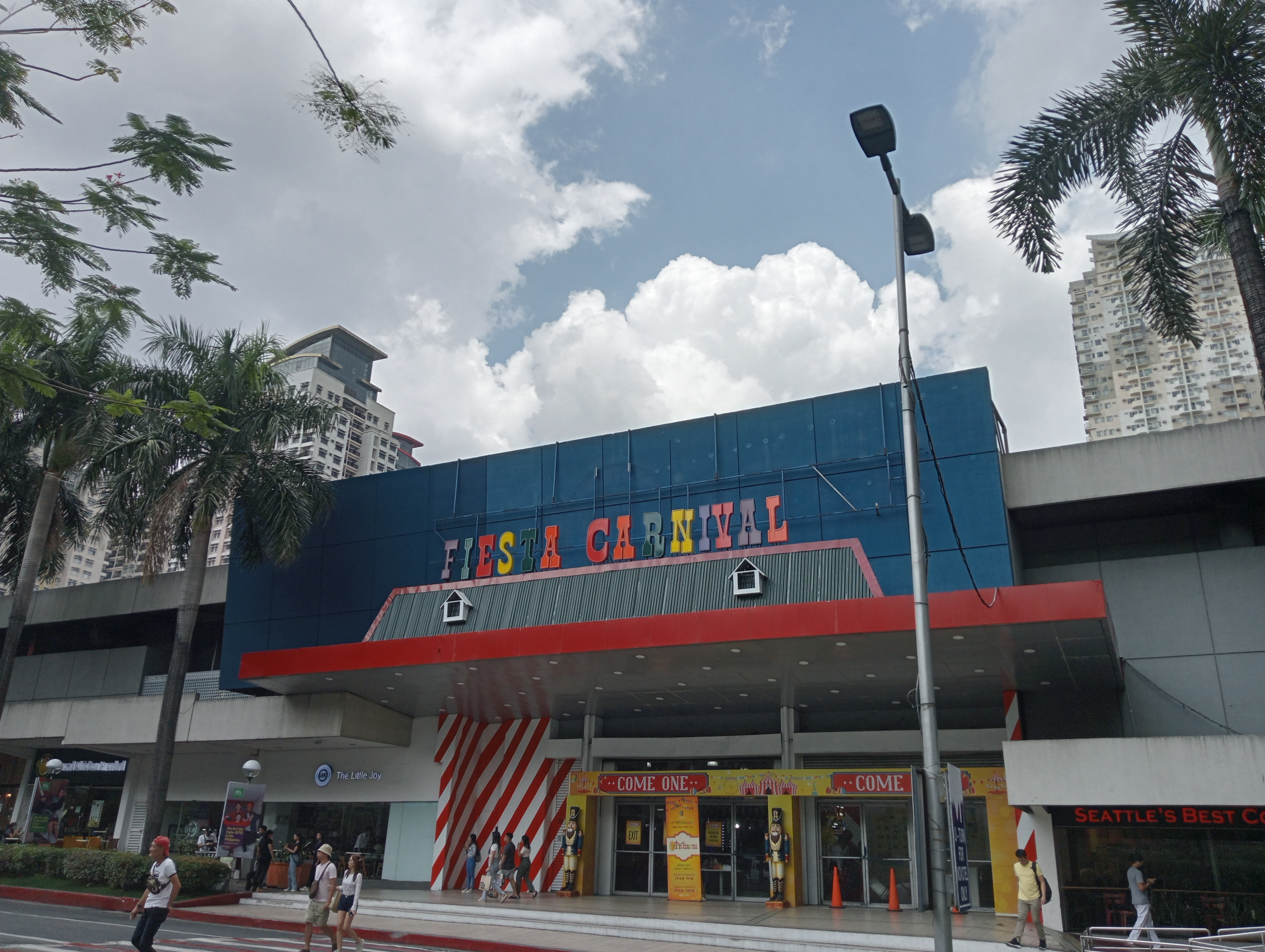
Fiesta Carnival

The Fiesta Carnival is an indoor amusement park located along General Aguinaldo and General McArthur Avenues. Following the closure of the original Fiesta Carnival, an indoor amusement park which occupied the building from its opening in 1971 to the late 1990s, Shopwise opened its doors in 2004 and serves as one of the biggest branches of the supermarket brand, which has a 18,000 m^{2} (190,000 sq ft) of retail space. On July 28, 2023, Shopwise moved to the lower ground section of the new Gateway Mall 2, while efforts were made to revive the complex. The original target date of the opening of the amusement park was set within November 2023, yet was eventually moved to December 2023.

On December 9, 2023, the Araneta Group and REKS Amusement launched the soft opening of the revived Fiesta Carnival, which offers a variety of indoor activities, arcade video games, food kiosks, and a carnival themed activity area. Full operations of the amusement park began on December 16, 2023, a week after the soft opening of the complex. On February 1, 2026, the amusement park was temporarily closed for renovation works while demolishing small portions of the complex in order to give way for the upcoming Coliseum Plaza and Fiesta Trade Hall developments.

==== Cubao Expo ====
The Cubao Expo, formerly known as the Marikina Shoe Expo, is a commercial and cultural complex along General Romulo Avenue. Established in the 1970s as a center for locally made footwear, it later declined as the local shoe industry and retail landscape changed. The complex subsequently developed into a destination for independent businesses, including antique and vintage shops, restaurants, cafés, specialty stores, and creative spaces. It became associated with an independent creative and cultural scene, attracting artists, musicians, collectors, and other communities alongside its retail and dining establishments.

==== Other shops and leisure spaces ====
The complex also contains numerous al fresco dining areas, vintage shops, and plant and gardening shops catering its clientele, such as the Araneta City Expo, the Farmers Garden, and the Manhattan Row, wherein the area also serves as an alternative outdoor concert venue. On 3 June 2022, the Araneta City Foodpark, which is also known as the Times Square Food Park, was repurposed in partnership with S&T Leisure Worldwide and became the Araneta Fiesta Park, offering outdoor rides, attractions and outdoor dining spaces. On November 11 of the same year, Araneta City revives the iconic Christmas On Display (COD), mounted inside the Carnival, while on November 18, the Araneta Fiesta Park rebrands as Mini Fiesta Carnival.

The Fiesta Carnival Park was initially restored as the Times Square Food Park on November 10, 2023, following the lighting of the 100-foot giant Christmas Tree situated in the area.

=== Hotels ===
The complex currently houses five hotels, wherein two of the hotels are owned by Araneta Hotels Inc., in partnership with Accor Hotels. The two hotels are the Novotel Manila Araneta City, which opened its doors in 2015, and the Ibis Styles Araneta City, which opened in 2025. Meanwhile, three hotels in the area are owned by different companies, such as Cheers Hotel, located along EDSA, Hotel Dreamworld, which is formerly occupied by Eurotel, and Eurotel, which occupies the first seven floors of the Vivaldi Residences Cubao, serve as the budget hotel component within the complex.

==== Novotel Manila Araneta City ====
Novotel Manila Araneta City

The Novotel Manila Araneta City is a 24-storey, 4-star hotel located at the southeast corner to the Araneta Coliseum, and serves as the first Novotel hotel in the country. The hotel has a total of 401 rooms and features five restaurants, seven meeting and function rooms, a spa room, a play area, an open-air events space, a Premium Lounge and a penthouse at the topmost floor.

==== Ibis Styles Araneta City ====
The Ibis Styles Araneta City is a 3-star hotel located adjacent to the Gateway Mall 2, along General Roxas Avenue. The budget hotel opened its doors in a soft opening in March 2024, and features 286 rooms and features five function rooms, three restaurants, a lobby lounge, a co-working space with an all-day patisserie, and a rooftop pool bar with a cantilevered pool.

=== Office towers and commercial buildings ===
==== Aurora Tower ====
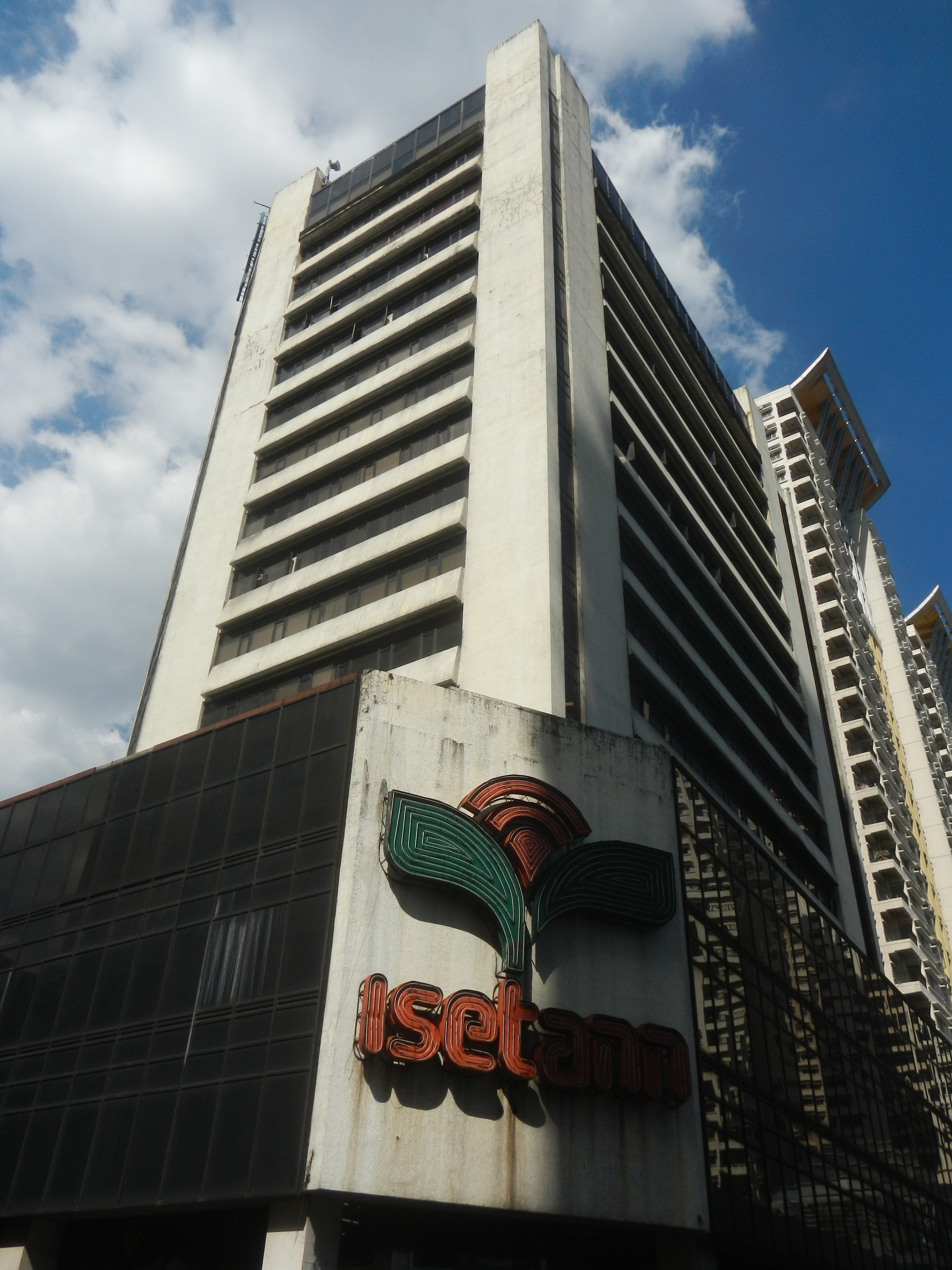
Aurora Tower

The Aurora Tower is a 22-storey, mixed-use tower comprising retail, office, penthouse spaces and a rooftop helipad, with Isetann Department Store and Supermarket occupying its first seven floors. The tower has 26,342 m^{2} (283,540 sq ft) of total space and was completed in 1984. The tower also serves as the former headquarters of the Araneta Group and currently houses local companies, which includes the offices of the Honorary Consulate of Colombia as tenants occupy the upper levels of the building.

==== Gateway Office ====
The Gateway Office is a PEZA-certified 11-storey office building situated along Aurora Boulevard and General Aguinaldo Avenue. The building was completed in 2005 and has a total floor area of 6,700 m^{2} (72,000 sq ft) of office space, which is also directly connected to the Gateway Mall 1 and the LRT 2 Gateway Mall Concourse on its ground level and on the building's second floor.

==== Gateway Tower ====
The Gateway Tower is a 31-storey mixed-use tower directly connected to the Gateway Mall. Completed in 2014, the tower serves as the headquarters of the Araneta Group and other Business Process Outsourcing (BPO) companies. The tower also comprises retail spaces, more commonly known as the Gateway Tower Mall, corporate office spaces, which are currently occupied by the Araneta Group, 3 penthouse levels, and a helipad.

==== Araneta City Cyberpark ====
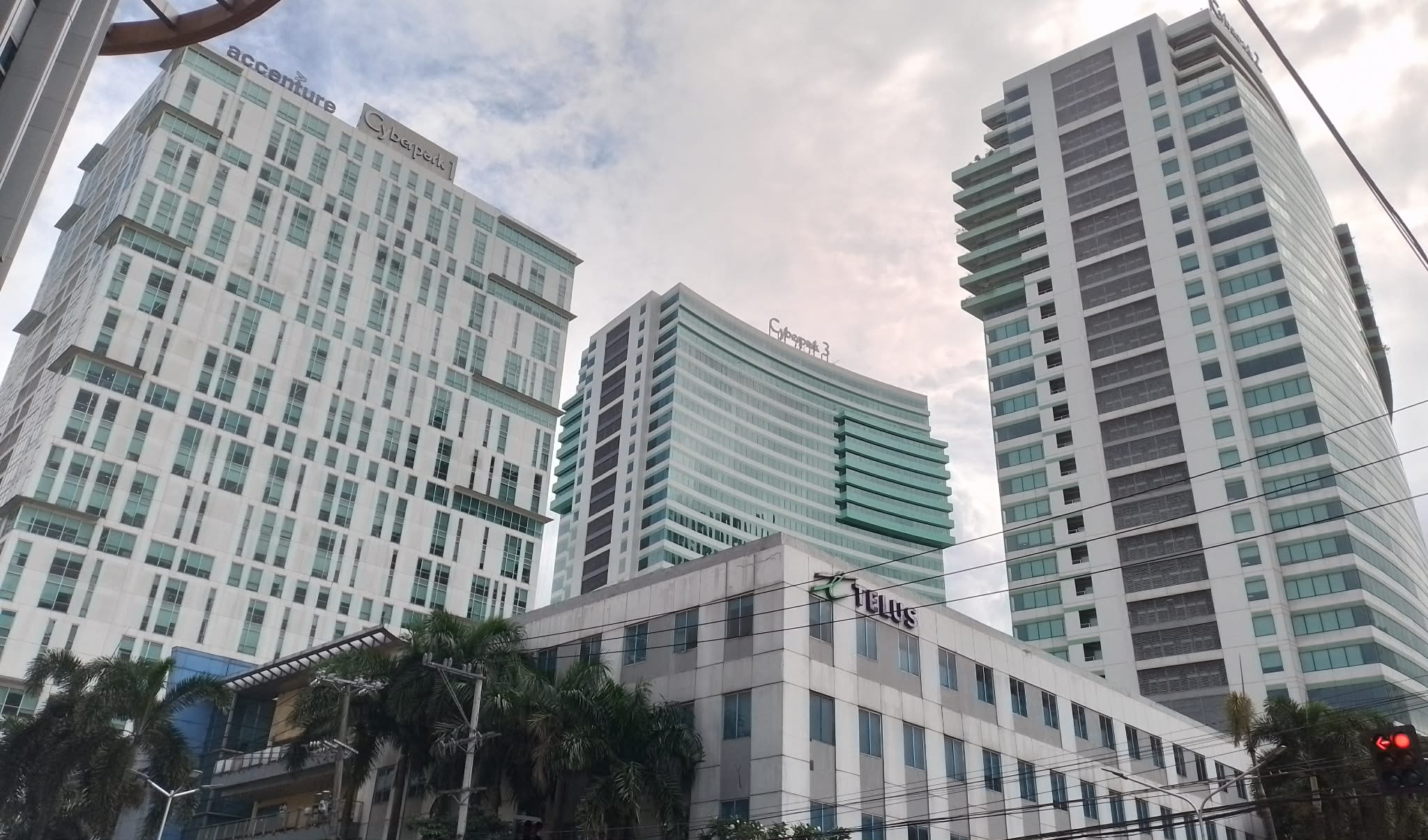
Araneta City Cyberpark

The Araneta City Cyberpark is a 8-hectare (20-acre) office development complex located within the city's southern cluster and serves as the office and information technology (IT) Hub components of the area, and houses both international and local companies, primarily Business Process Outsourcing (BPO) companies. The complex currently comprises three towers, namely Cyberpark Tower 1, Tower 2, and Tower 3 which were completed in 2016, 2019 and 2025, respectively, with two more towers, Cyberpark Tower 4 and Tower 5, on the way.

==== Other commercial buildings ====
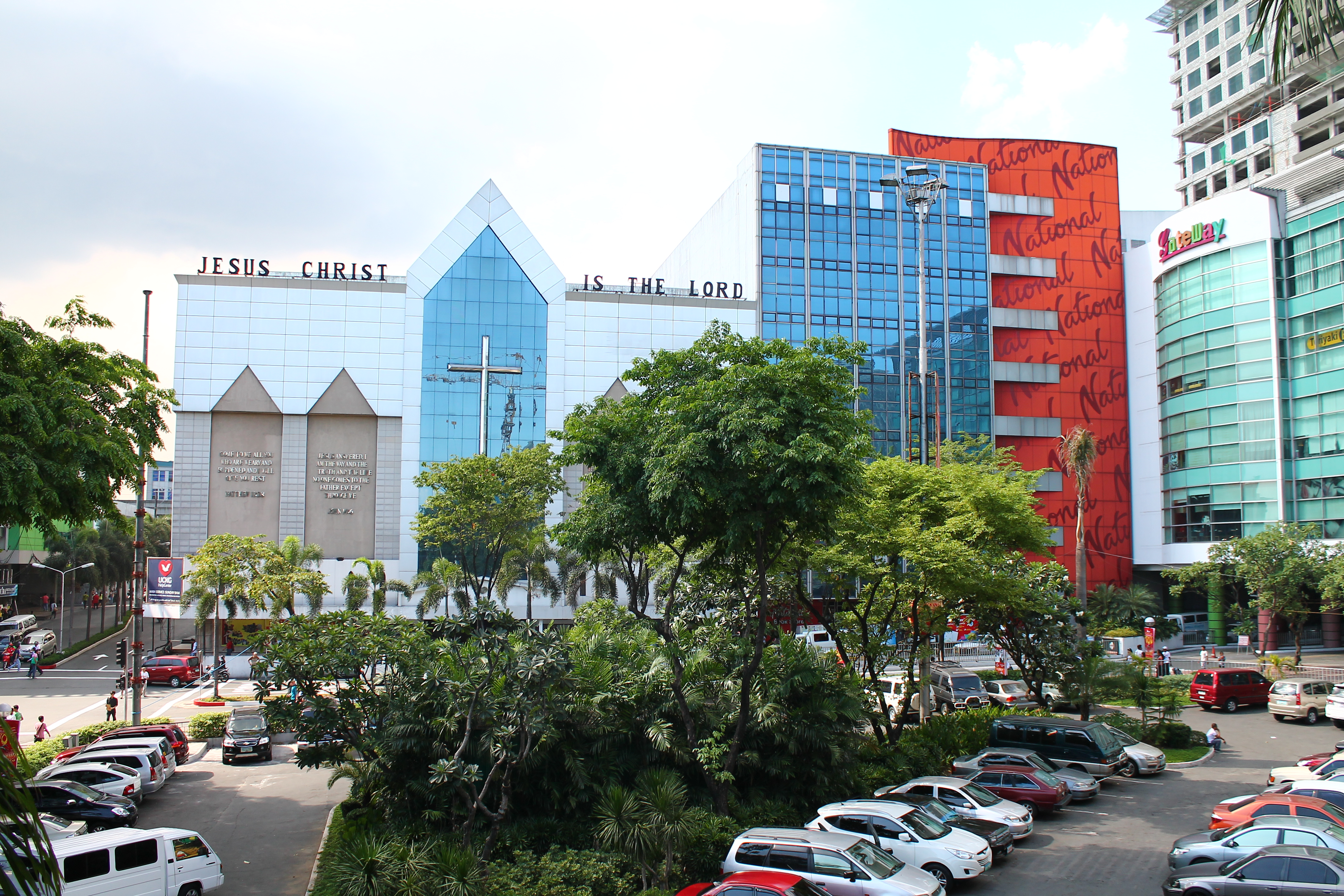
The National Book Store Superbranch, along with the former Quezon Theater (2012)

The Araneta City is also home to other commercial buildings within the area, wherein some of the buildings served as movie theaters repurposed into various purposes, or newly built buildings within the 2000s. These buildings are presently occupied by Puregold, Rex Bookstore, Savemore Market, the Philippine American Life and General Insurance Company, and other local firms.

=== Residential ===
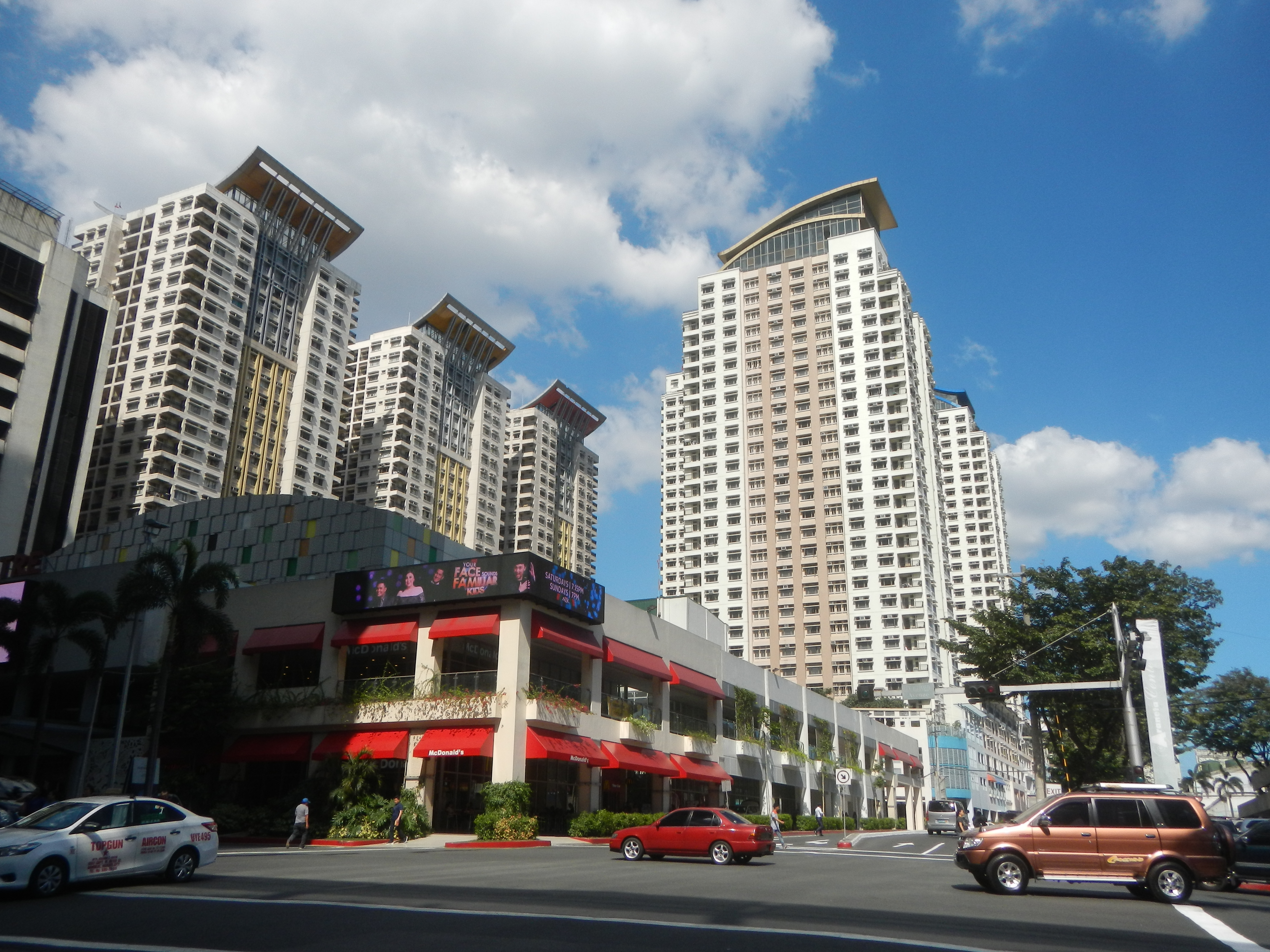
The New Frontier Theater, along with the Manhattan Parkway and the Manhattan Parkview.

==== Manhattan Gardens ====
The Manhattan Gardens is a four-phase (Parkway, Parkview, Heights, Plaza) condominium complex, serving as the first transit-oriented residential development in the country, and occupies 5.7-hectare (14-acre) hectares of the Araneta City. The development project will have a total condominium units of 9,000 units spread out through 18 residential towers upon completion. At present, the Manhattan Gardens currently has twelve towers in completion, and is now set to construct several additional condominium towers on the pipeline within the former Araneta City Bus Station.

==== Vivaldi Residences Cubao ====
Another residential project located within the complex is the Vivaldi Residences Cubao, a 40-storey mixed-use tower, located along the northwestern side of the complex, and along the corners of EDSA and Aurora Boulevard. Owned and managed by Euro Towers International Inc., the tower began construction in 2011, before being completed in 2016, and houses Eurotel on its first seven floors.

=== Mixed-use development ===
==== Gateway Square ====
The Gateway Square is a 5-hectare (12-acre) mixed-use superblock development located in the central part of the Araneta City. Gateway Square occupies the buildings around the Smart Araneta Coliseum and the Gateway Malls 1 and 2 and consists of the eight properties, namely the Gateway Mall 1, the Gateway Mall 2, the Gateway Tower, the Gateway Office, the Smart Araneta Coliseum, the Novotel Manila Araneta City, the Ibis Styles Araneta City and the Parking Garage South.

The mixed-use complex has a total floor area of 400,000 m^{2} (4,300,000 sq ft) and is the first of its kind in the country as the complex offers a combination of malls, offices, hotels, a sports arena and over 3,100 parking spaces all within a single area. Direct connections to other buildings and developments within the Araneta City are allows seamless transfers through sky bridges, direct access paths, and pedestrian walk paths. The complex also has direct connections to various transport systems, as the Gateway Square hosts two railway stations and other feeder transport systems. The development first began construction in October 2002 with the groundbreaking of the Gateway Mall 1 and the entire complex was completed on 2024, with the completion of the Gateway Mall 2 and the Ibis Styles Hotel.

==== City Plaza ====
Set to be built within the Shopwise Supermarket, which is currently revived as Fiesta Carnival, the City Plaza is a 2 hectares (4.9 acres) mixed-use development consisting of five towers with approximately 60 storeys skyward or higher for each tower. The City Plaza will also feature a four-star hotel, two premium grade office towers, two luxury residential towers, leisure and retail spaces, and green amenities such as an outdoor concourse, an amphitheater; the "Spanish Steps", which were inspired from the Spanish Steps in Rome, Italy, and the civic center, located in the middle of the complex. The upcoming complex will also be influenced from the Rockefeller Center in New York City and is presently in the under development stages.

=== Araneta Mansion ===
The Araneta Mansion, which is commonly known as the White House, and is often translated as the Bahay Na Puti, is also located within the Araneta City, occupying the southwest corner of the complex located along the corner of P. Tuazon Boulevard and Epifanio de los Santos Avenue, and serves as the official residence and ancestral home of the Araneta family. Spanning at 4 hectares (9.9 acres) of land, the private property also features approximately 300 chicken dens on the mansion's western side for cockfighting and fowl breeding purposes.

== Transportation ==
The Araneta City Bus Port

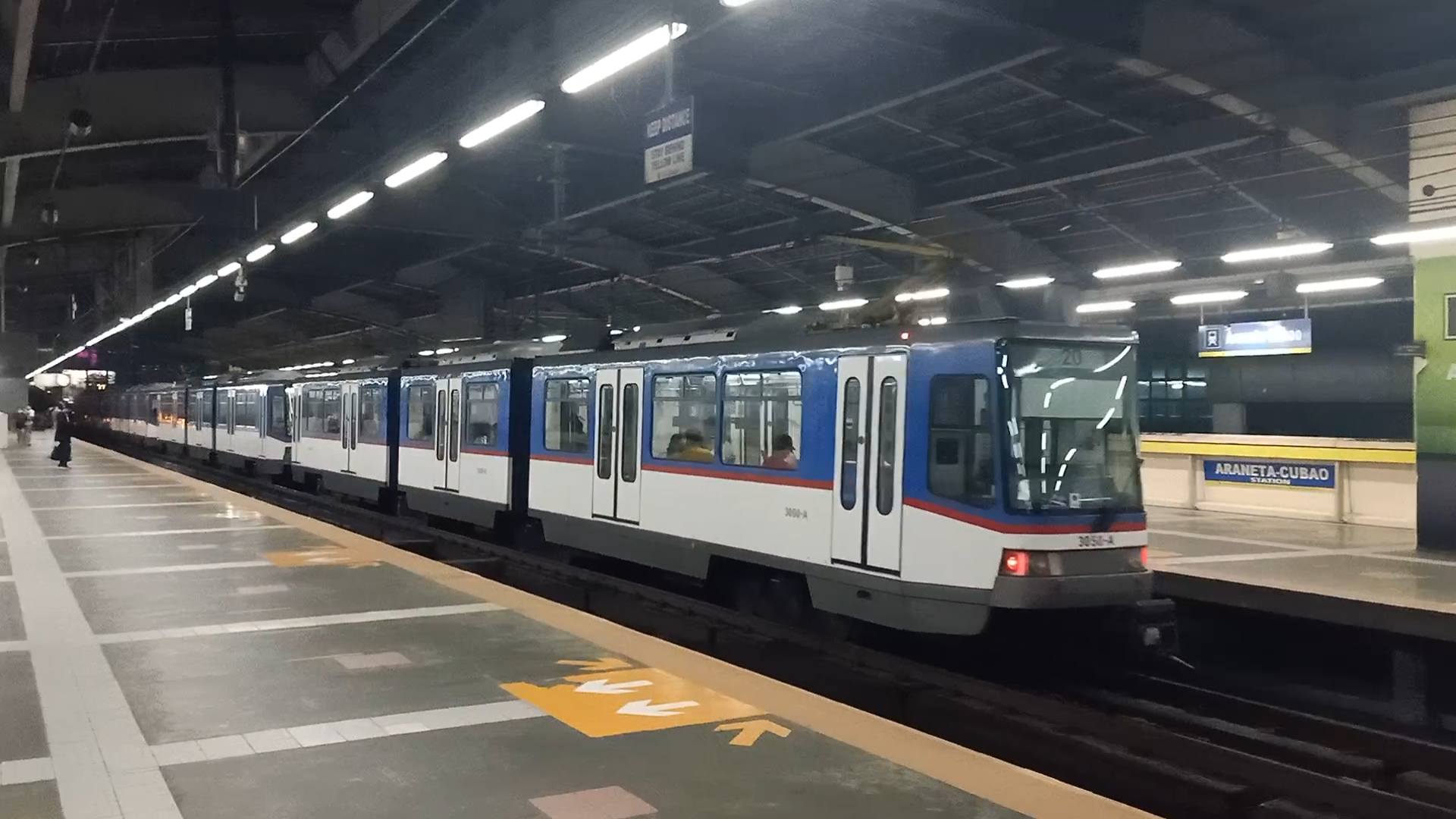
MRT Line 3 Araneta Center–Cubao station

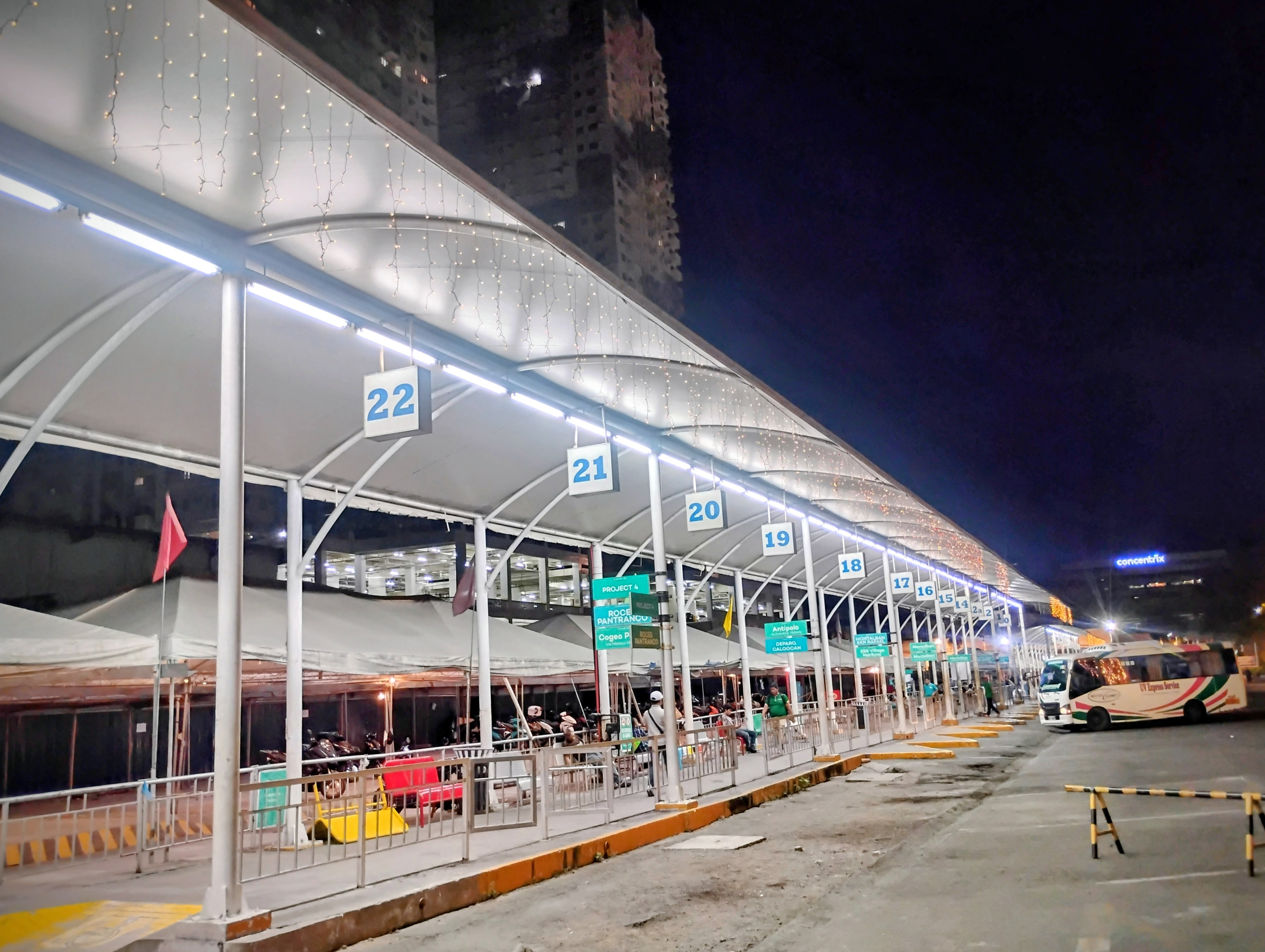
An e-jeep terminal along Times Square Avenue

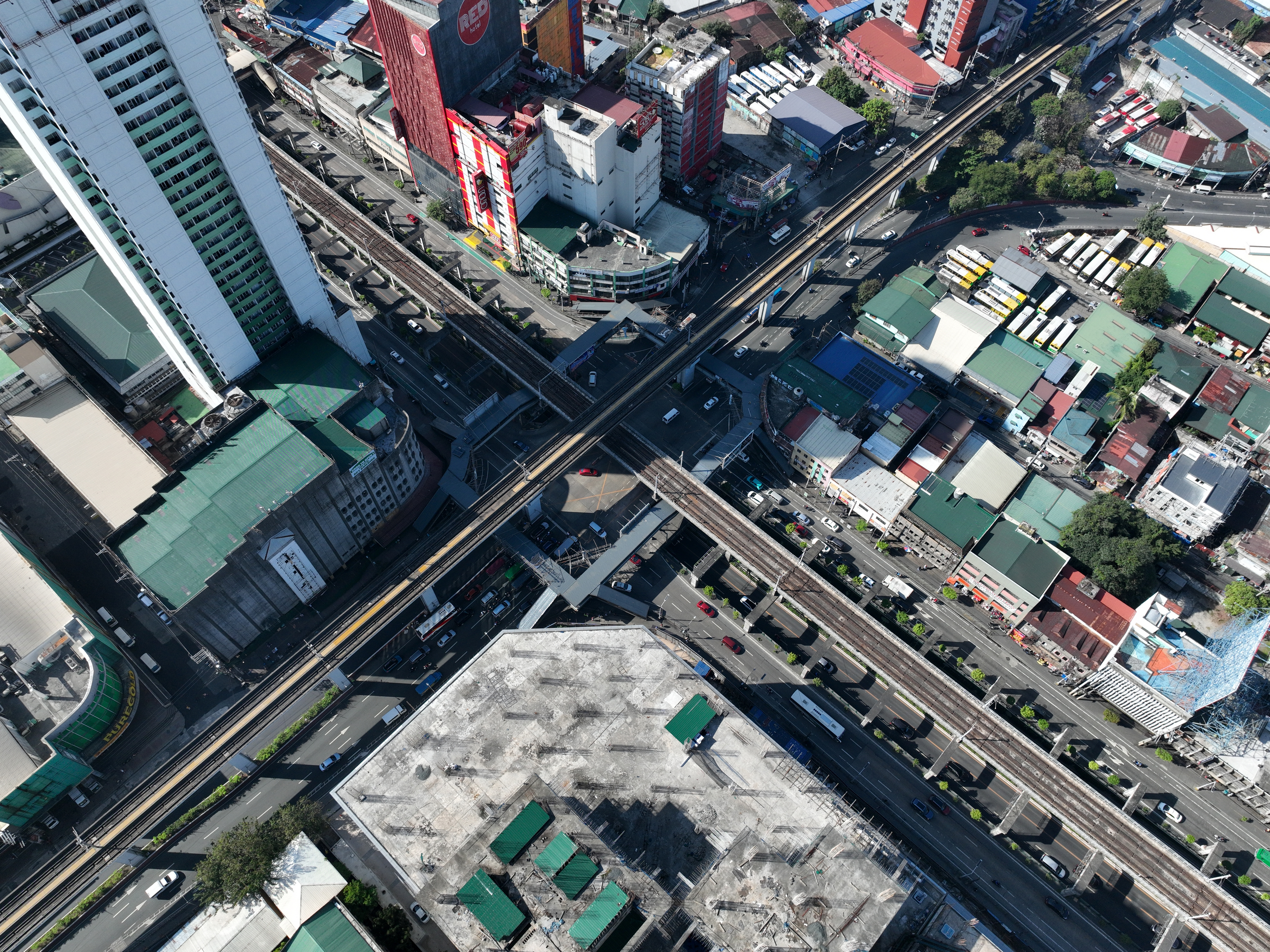
A drone shot of the EDSA - Aurora Boulevard intersection, with the intersecting tracks of the MRT 3 and LRT 2 on the foreground

There are two elevated rail stations serving the area; the MRT Line 3 and the LRT Line 2 Araneta Center-Cubao stations. The area also serves as a terminal for jeepneys, BEEP Jeepneys, and UV Express vehicles serving the nearby areas within Metro Manila and the province of Rizal, such as the former Araneta City Bus Station, which is currently occupied by BEEP Jeepneys, Modern Jeeps and UV Express operators. UV Express vehicles bound for selected destinations in Laguna, such as San Pedro, Balibago, Santa Rosa, and Santa Rosa are also available located at the Gateway Mall-LRT 2 concourse.

The city also caters a bus terminal, the Araneta City Busport, servicing local and long-distance passengers going to provinces in both Central Luzon and Southern Luzon. The area around the complex also serves as a transport terminal for other jeepneys and provincial buses serving nearby cities and provincial areas around the country. Buses also connect the area to selected rationalized bus routes under bus route numbers 51 (bound for Valenzuela Gateway Complex), and 55 (bound for San Pedro Pacita Complex). Buses bound to Antipolo, and under bus route 61 bound for Dasmariñas-Robinsons Dasmariñas are also located along the Puregold Bus Stop, located along Aurora Boulevard, while buses to and from Bulakan, Bulacan make stops within Ali Mall and SM Cubao. The Main Avenue Bus Station of the EDSA Busway is also located a few hundred meters south of the complex, while the Cubao Bus Station of the EDSA Busway, located at the northern part of the area, is currently under construction.

Aside from provincial destinations, the Araneta City Busport also offers local routes within Metro Manila and Bulacan, as well as the UBE Express Premium Point-to-Point Airport Bus Service, which connects Araneta City to Manila International Airport. The complex also offers a free E-shuttle services from Ali Mall, up to the LRT 2-Gateway Mall Concourse, as well as to Gateway Mall 2 and vice versa. The free E-shuttle services began operations on June 20, 2009, and were temporarily suspended in March 2020 in the aftermath of the COVID-19 pandemic in the Philippines. The E-shuttle service were returned to service in November 2022.

== See also ==
- Eastwood City
- Ortigas Center
- Greenhills
- Eton Centris
- Vertis North
- Triangle Park
