= Vivaldi (disambiguation) =

Antonio Vivaldi (1678–1741) was an Italian composer.

Vivaldi may also refer to:

== Science and technology ==
- Vivaldi (crater), a crater on the planet Mercury
- Vivaldi antenna, a type of broadband antenna
- Vivaldi coordinates, a virtual networking positioning system
- Vivaldi Technologies, a software development company
  - Vivaldi (web browser), a web browser developed by Vivaldi Technologies
- 4330 Vivaldi, a minor planet

== Arts, media, and entertainment ==
- Vivaldi, the Red Priest, 2009 Italian film based upon the life of Antonio Vivaldi
- "Vivaldi", a song by Pete Townshend on Lifehouse Chronicles
- Vivaldi, Dutch drag queen who competed on the second season of Drag Race Holland

== Other uses ==
- Caffe Vivaldi, a former coffeehouse and restaurant in New York City
- Vivaldi Atlantic 4, a 2005 British team who broke the eastbound record for rowing the Atlantic
- Vivaldi Coalition, the De Croo Government is a so-called Vivaldi coalition
- Vivaldi Glacier, a glacier in Antarctica named after the composer
- Vivaldi potato, a potato cultivar
- Vivaldi (surname), including a list of people with the surname

== See also ==
- Vivaldi Residences (disambiguation)
- List of compositions by Antonio Vivaldi
- List of operas by Antonio Vivaldi
