= Vivaldi Residences =

Vivaldi Residences may refer to

- Vivaldi Residences Cubao, a residential building in Quezon City
- Vivaldi Residences Davao, a residential building in Davao City
