= Vivaldi (surname) =

Vivaldi is a surname. Notable people with the surname include:

- Angel Vivaldi (born 1985), American musician
- Antonio Vivaldi (1678–1741), Italian composer
- Juan Manuel Vivaldi (born 1979), Argentine field hockey player
- María Teresa Martín-Vivaldi (born 1955), Spanish painter
- Ugolino Vivaldi (fl. 1291), Genovese explorer
- Ugolino Vivaldi Pasqua (1885–1910), Italian aviator
- Vandino Vivaldi (fl. 1291), Genovese explorer

== See also ==
- Vivaldi (disambiguation)
