= Manhattan Gardens =

Residential development in Quezon City, Philippines

- A view of the Manhattan Heights and the Manhattan Plaza towers viewed from SM Cubao
- Interactive map of Manhattan Gardens
- Location: Araneta City, Cubao, Quezon City, Metro Manila, Philippines
- Coordinates: 14°37′15″N 121°03′12″E
- Status: Under Development; 12 out of 18 towers completed
- Groundbreaking: 2007
- Constructed: 2011–present
- Estimated completion: within 2030 (targeted)
- Use: Residential
- Website: www.themanhattangardencity.com

Companies
- Architect: RTKL Associates and Palafox Associates
- Contractor: BF Corporation (Parkway and Parkview); Millennium Erectors Corporation (Heights and Plaza Towers 1 & 2); EEI Corporation (Laurent Park)
- Developer: Araneta Group; Megaworld Corporation
- Owner: Araneta Group; Megaworld Corporation
- Planner: RTKL Associates and Palafox Associates

Technical details
- Cost: ₱15 billion (US$296.16 million) (2005 estimate)
- Buildings: Manhattan Parkway (28-storeys); Manhattan Parkview (31-storeys); Manhattan Heights (Tower A & C- 30 storeys, Tower B- 35 storeys, Tower D-25 storeys); Manhattan Plaza (Tower 1- 41 storeys, Tower 2- 39 storeys, Laurent Park- 39 storeys)
- Size: 5.7 hectares (14 acres)
- No. of residents: over 8,000 (2023) over 36,000 (upon completion)
- Proposed: 1987 (1st plan); 2000 (2nd and present plan)

The Manhattan Gardens, also known as the Manhattan Gardens at Araneta City, is a 5.7-hectare (14-acre) transit-oriented residential development located at the Araneta City in Cubao, Quezon City. The project is a joint-venture project between the Araneta Group and the Megaworld Corporation, and marketed under Empire East Land Holdings Inc., a subsidiary of the Megaworld Corporation. The development is currently under development with 12 out of the 18 buildings completed, with 1 tower being under construction and 5 more towers set to be constructed in the pipeline.

== History and planning ==
The origins of the Manhattan Gardens, formerly named as the "Manhattan Garden City" before the Araneta City brand relaunch, were first traced in the following months after the People Power Revolution. As business optimism grew during the Presidency of Corazon Aquino, Araneta Group CEO Jorge L. Araneta launched a mixed-use residential and retail development, named the "Manhattan Tower" project. The project became a hit to local and foreign investors, and groundbreaking began in 1988, located along the present location of the Manhattan Parkview complex. However, the project hit a snag and was scrapped in 1989 in the aftermath of the 1989 coup attempt that rocked Metro Manila, and was followed by the financial problems of the Araneta Group during the 1990s due to stiff competition between other central business districts and bigger malls, as well as rising expenses and maintenance costs in maintaining its buildings and facilities.

As the Araneta Center began deteriorating in the 1990s, the shops within the area began to shut its doors due to financial issues, political uncertainties, and rising competition from newer malls within Metro Manila. A few years later, as the Araneta Group managed to stabilize its financial foundations, the planned development was revived and was part of the Araneta City master plan unveiled in 2000. The plans for the redevelopment project are composed of the initial mixed-use residential and retail component, known then as the "Manhattan Mall", consisting a two-storey mall with 19,000 m^{2} (200,000 sq ft) of retail space, and a residential development with direct connections to the MRT 3 Cubao and LRT 2 Cubao stations; the Millennium Mall, which currently serves as the foundation of today's Gateway Mall; the Manila Tower, a planned 300 m (984.3 ft) mixed-use tower; the Novotel Manila Araneta City and the Araneta City Cyberpark, with direct connections to other properties at the Araneta City via elevated walkways and pedestrian sidewalks. In 2005, an agreement was signed between Jorge Araneta and Andrew Tan for the construction of the project. The demolition for the old buildings to give way for the new project began in 2006, and was completed in 2007, while the overall construction of the complex began within 2007, with the erection of the Manhattan Parkway, and in 2011, as the Manhattan Parkview and the Manhattan Heights followed suit. The project consists of 18 residential towers, which will have 9,000 estimated units upon completion and will soon house an estimated 36,000 residents. Deshazo Group, Jones Lang LaSalle Inc., and Colliers International were tapped as the primary consultants of the development of the Manhattan Garden's master plan.

During the early stages of planning in 2006-2011, a total of 17 towers were planned to be built. Nonetheless, additional proposals were laid out to build Manhattan Heights as a 6-tower residential complex, while the Manhattan Plaza features designs inspired from the Empire State Building, and the number of towers within the development were expanded from 5 towers to 8 towers, wherein the 8th tower will include a spire within the tower's roof, and totaling the development to 20 towers. The plans were finalized in 2012, as the number of towers were reduced to 18 towers, and the structural designs for the proposed Manhattan Heights and Manhattan Plaza were changed. In 2014, the design for the Manhattan Plaza was changed and was inspired from the Rockefeller Center, but was initially changed in 2017 and includes a curved rooftop and private gardens in the topmost floors. The Rockefeller Center-inspired development was moved to the planned City Plaza located across the development, located within the former Shopwise Building, currently being repurposed into the revival of the Fiesta Carnival.

The site of the Manhattan Parkway was originally the site of the Matsuzakaya Department Store, which became the first Japanese Department Store to open in the country during the 1960s, located alongside the Rempson Department Store, currently occupied by ABE International Business College, while the site of the Manhattan Parkview was the former Nation Cinerama, one of the first original movie theatres to open in the area. The Nation Cinerama was initially demolished in 1986 to give way for the planned Manhattan Tower plan, and was left intact for 22 years, before the area serves as the present foundations of the Manhattan Parkview complex. Meanwhile, the location of the Manhattan Heights sits on the site formerly occupied by car accessory shops, and the former site of the Araneta Center Bus Station, the first integrated bus terminal in the country completed in 1993, before being relocated beside the old Rustan's Superstore building at Times Square Avenue in 2011, while the Manhattan Plaza is located adjoined to the old Rustan's Superstore, currently occupied by the Araneta Center Bus Station, located on Times Square Avenue, completed in 1974. Rustan's later relocated its operations to the Gateway Mall following the mall's opening in 2005.

Presently, the construction of the fourth and final phase of the project, the Manhattan Plaza, began in 2014. The latest development consists of eight towers, including the planned "Icon Tower" and the Laurent Park, which serves as the latest tower set to be constructed within the development. The development sits on the former Rustan's Superstore building, the former Automatic Super Centre building and the Araneta Bus Station, which was repurposed to cater Beep Jeepneys and Modernized Jeepneys. The targeted completion of the entire residential development is set within 2030, as part of the Araneta Group's Vision 2030 plan.

== Development ==
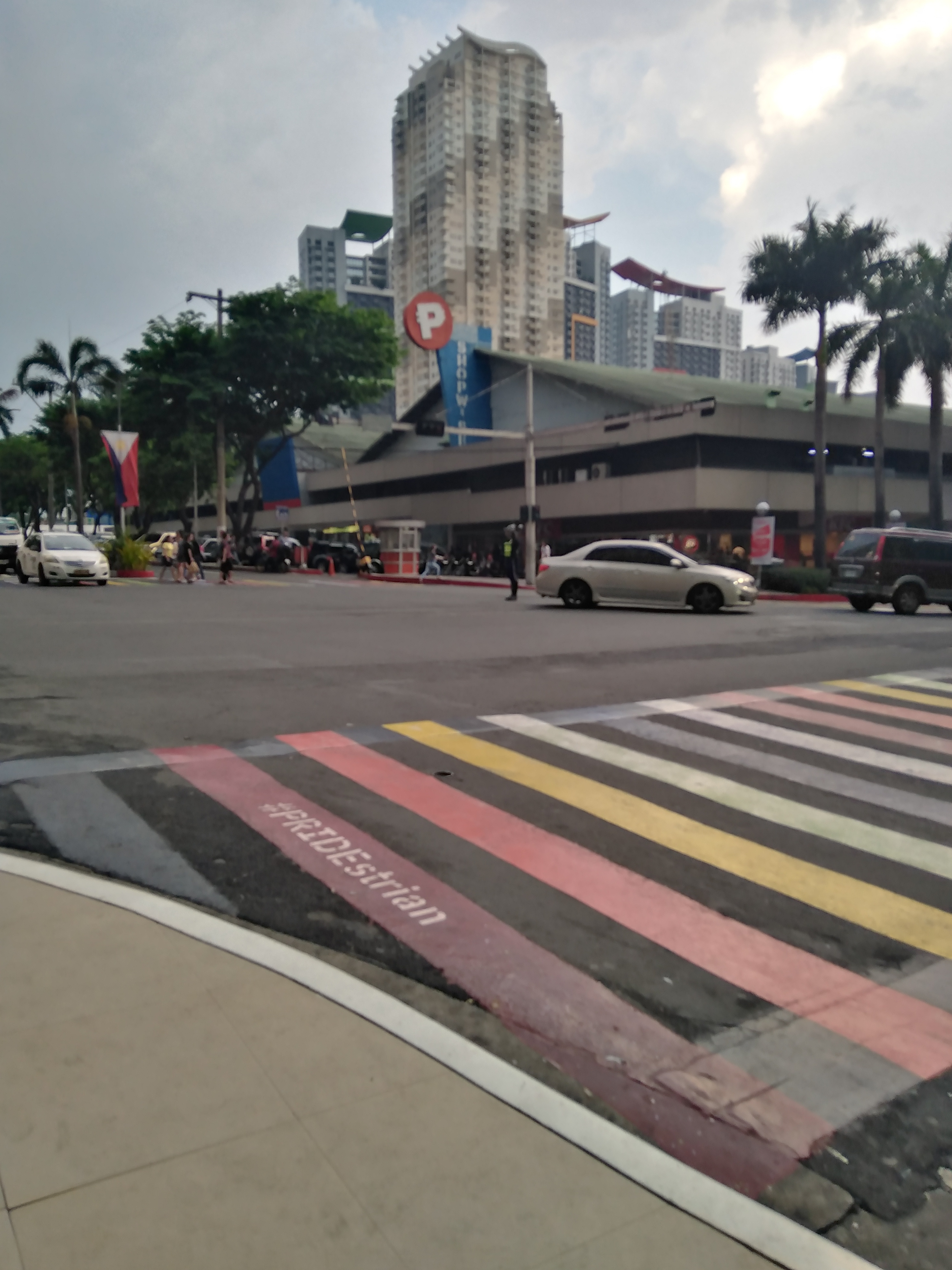
A rainbow colored pedestrian lane, with Shopwise Hypermarket, the Manhattan Heights and the Manhattan Plaza on the background (2019)

The Manhattan Gardens consists of 4 residential developments (Manhattan Parkway, Manhattan Parkview, Manhattan Heights, Manhattan Plaza), which gives direct access to the MRT 3 Cubao and LRT 2 Cubao stations, as well as other buildings in the Araneta City, such as Ali Mall, SM Cubao, Araneta City Cyberpark, the Gateway Mall, the Farmers Plaza, the New Frontier Theater, the Gateway Tower and the Ibis Styles Araneta City, with elevated bridge-ways connecting each building for accessibility and comfort of its residents. The development comprises a total of 8,500 condominium units and 30,000 m^{2} (320,000 sq ft) of retail spaces located at the ground floor of each towers once completed.

The project became the first transit-oriented residential development in the country, and has four phases, with the first of the four developments, the 28-storey, Manhattan Parkway, began groundbreaking in 2007, and was completed in 2011. The second development, the 31-storey, Manhattan Parkview, began construction in 2011 and was finished by 2013, featuring clustered Garden Villas on the building's 4th floor. The first two developments consists of three towers each and are located at the northeastern area of the Araneta City, and stands along Aurora Boulevard and Gen. Malvar Avenue.

The third development, the Manhattan Heights, is located at the southeastern area of the city, along Gen. Romulo Avenue, and consists of 4 towers. The four towers features matching outlines with curved structural shapes, while subsequently possessing differentiations in the location of the buildings' sky gardens and the height of each building. Construction began in 2011, and was initially planned to be completed in 2017. However, the project faced many issues, before being fully completed in 2019, housing the Araneta City Bus Port in the ground floor, beneath the Manhattan Heights Tower D.

The fourth and final development of the project, the Manhattan Plaza, also located along Gen. Romulo Avenue, consists of 8 towers, and will feature the Icon Tower, a 60-storey tower; and the Spanish Steps. The upcoming development will soon have direct access to the City Plaza, a 2 hectare mixed-use development comprising retail and leisure spaces, premium graded offices and residential units, a multi-storey 4-star hotel, and green civic spaces. Groundbreaking for the project began in 2014, while the construction phase started in late 2015. The first tower, the Manhattan Plaza Tower 1, was topped off in 2016, before being completed on the 3rd quarter of 2018, and having a total of 41 floors. The second building within the complex, the Manhattan Plaza Tower 2, began being erected subsequently within 2018, before being topped off in October 2021, and was completed within October 2023. ESCA Engineers were also tapped to serve as the structural engineer of the project.

On July 4, 2023, Megaworld Corporation launched its latest condominium development within the complex named Laurent Park. The Laurent Park is a ₱6.5 billion upcoming 39-storey tower and is the first Megaworld-branded premium development and serves as the third tower of the Manhattan Plaza complex, while also serving as the first "Premier Tower" in the complex. The tower is set to rise at the corner lot within General Romulo and General Roxas Avenues with an L-shaped structural design with nature-inspired hues and will host 796 smart home units, wherein selected units will feature a lanai balconies within a loft-based design. The tower will feature a loft-style working spaces, a daycare playground, a function hall capable of housing 50 people, a lap pool, 2 play areas, 6 sky lounges with a variety of amenities such as a separate play area and a mini golf course, and a variety of outdoor recreational areas including a fitness area with energy-generating fitness equipment. The tower began its groundbreaking stage in July 2024, while EEI Corporation was named as the general contractor of the construction of the project. The tower is aimed to be completed within 2029.

=== Phases ===
Name	Image	Construction started	Completion	Height	Current status
Manhattan Parkway		2007; 19 years ago	2011; 15 years ago	108 m (354.3 ft)	Completed
Manhattan Parkview		2011; 15 years ago	2013; 13 years ago	118 m (387.1 ft)	Completed
Manhattan Heights		2011; 15 years ago	2019; 7 years ago	116 m (380.6 ft) (Tower 1); 126 m (413.4 ft) (Tower 2); 115 m (377.3 ft) (Tower 3); 96 m (315.0 ft) (Tower 4)	Completed
Manhattan Plaza		2014; 12 years ago	2018; 8 years ago (Tower 1) 2023; 3 years ago (Tower 2)	130 m (426.5 ft) (Tower 1); 124 m (406.8 ft) (Tower 2)	Under Construction, Towers 1 & 2 completed, 1 tower in groundbreaking stage, 5 more towers set to be built.

== Architecture ==
The architecture of the buildings features a variety of inspired designs from Manhattan, in New York City, which includes Art Deco inspired architectural designs, which also features a mixture of modern architecture and contemporary architecture styles, and was patterned with lush green spaces and garden-inspired landscaping in all its buildings. Similar designs can be found in the clustered Garden Villas featured within the Manhattan Parkview, and sky gardens within the complex. The towers also adopted identical architectural designs in the exteriors of the towers. Each of the towers feature a variety of curvilinear rooftops patterned with various colors within each development, seen in towers such as the Manhattan Parkview, which features a curved and innovative green glass rooftop design. The Manhattan Heights and the Manhattan Parkway characterizes an outward-facing curved rooftop arch, while the rooftop arches within the Manhattan Heights hallmarks a skylight within each of the tower's sky garden areas, which is similar to Ali Mall's General Romulo Avenue entrance, while the Manhattan Plaza features a wavy rooftop arch with minor setbacks that is also connected with a spire within the tower's topmost floors, connecting its design with a wrapped upward-looking facade with two brownish hues and earth-toned colors on the two towers.

The development also includes a variety of walk paths and elevated walkways connecting each towers to adjacent properties along the complex, which includes direct connections to the New Frontier Theater's second level, and the Gateway Mall through the Manhattan Parkview's transfer pavilion. The Manhattan Gardens also additional parking spaces for both guests, shoppers and residents, as well as dining, retail, and leisure establishments on the ground level, such as the famed Manhattan Row, located along Gen. Malvar Avenue, between the Manhattan Parkway and the Manhattan Parkview towers. The Manhattan Row also offers al fresco dining and entertainment events.

== Gallery ==
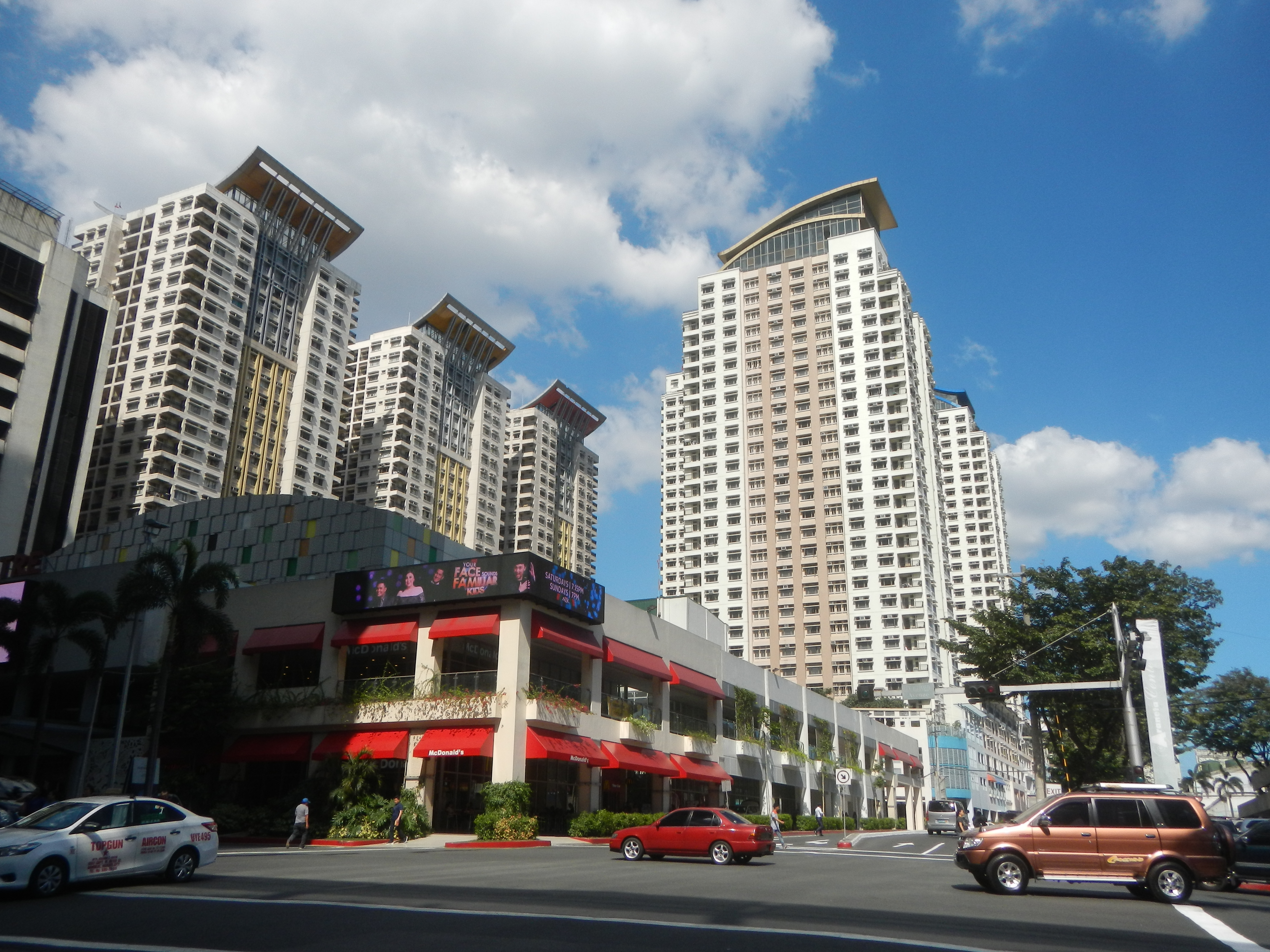
The New Frontier Theater, along with the Manhattan Parkway and the Manhattan Parkview in the background.

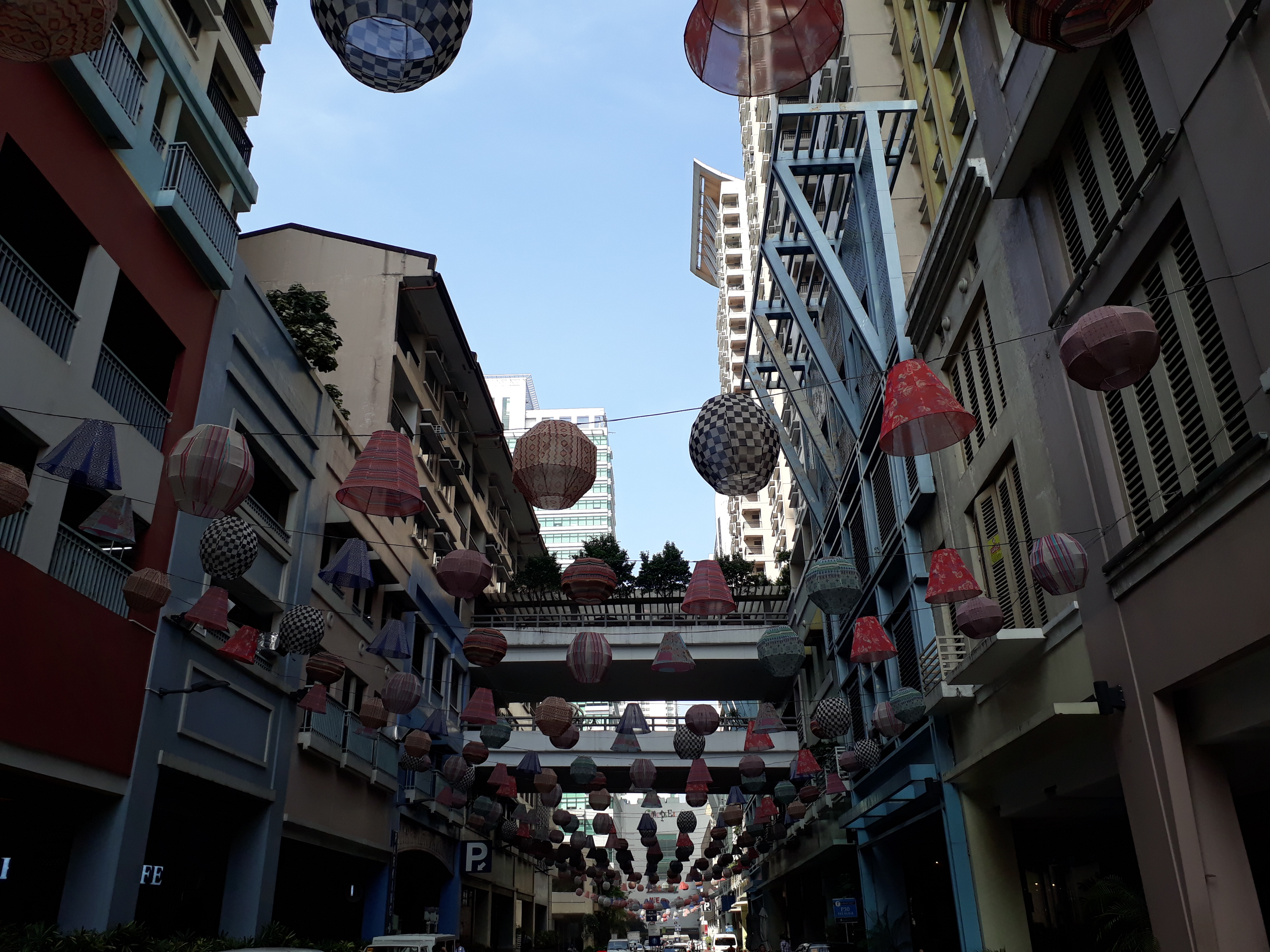
The Manhattan Row along Gen. Roxas Avenue

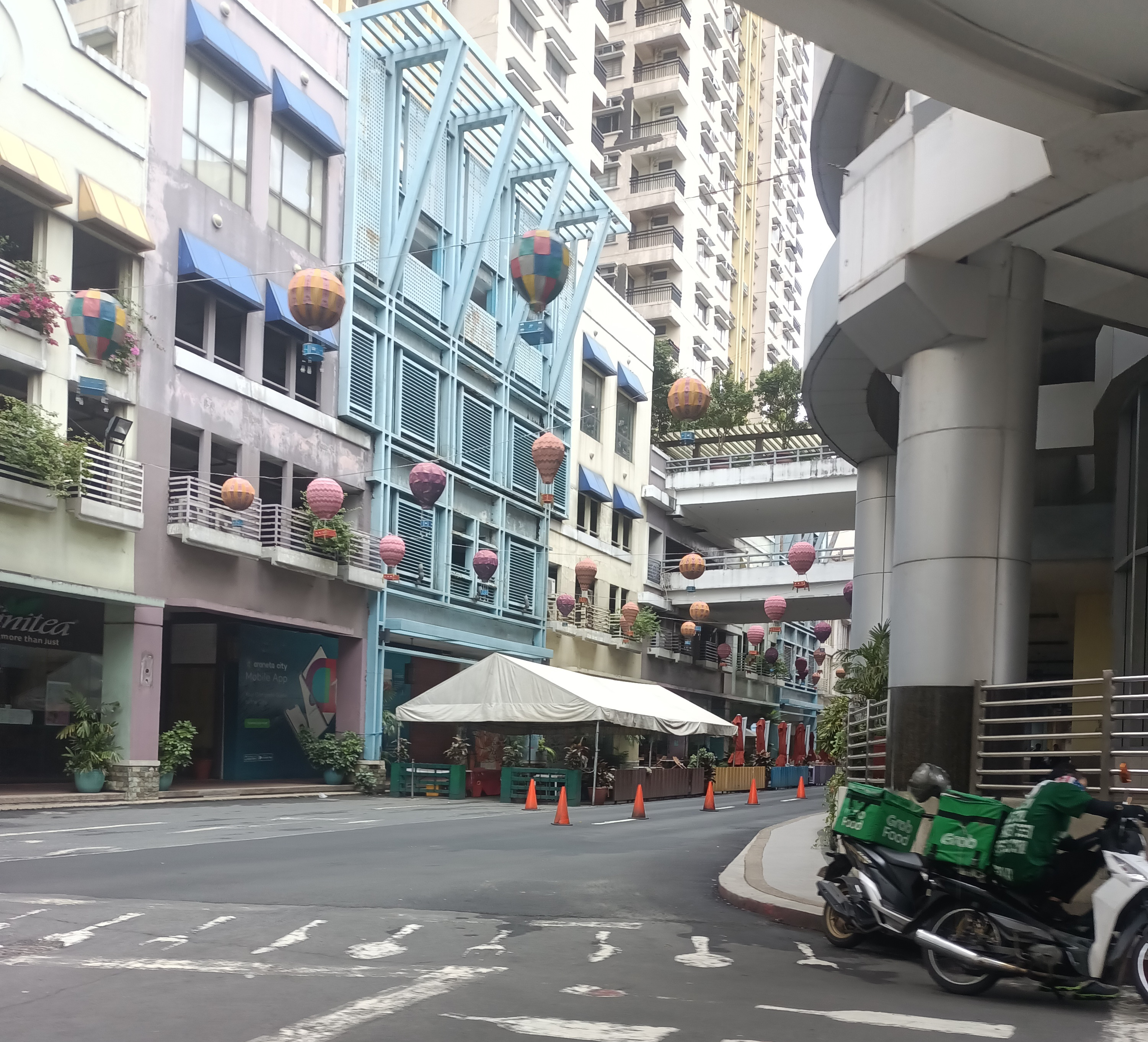
The Manhattan Row viewed from Times Square Avenue

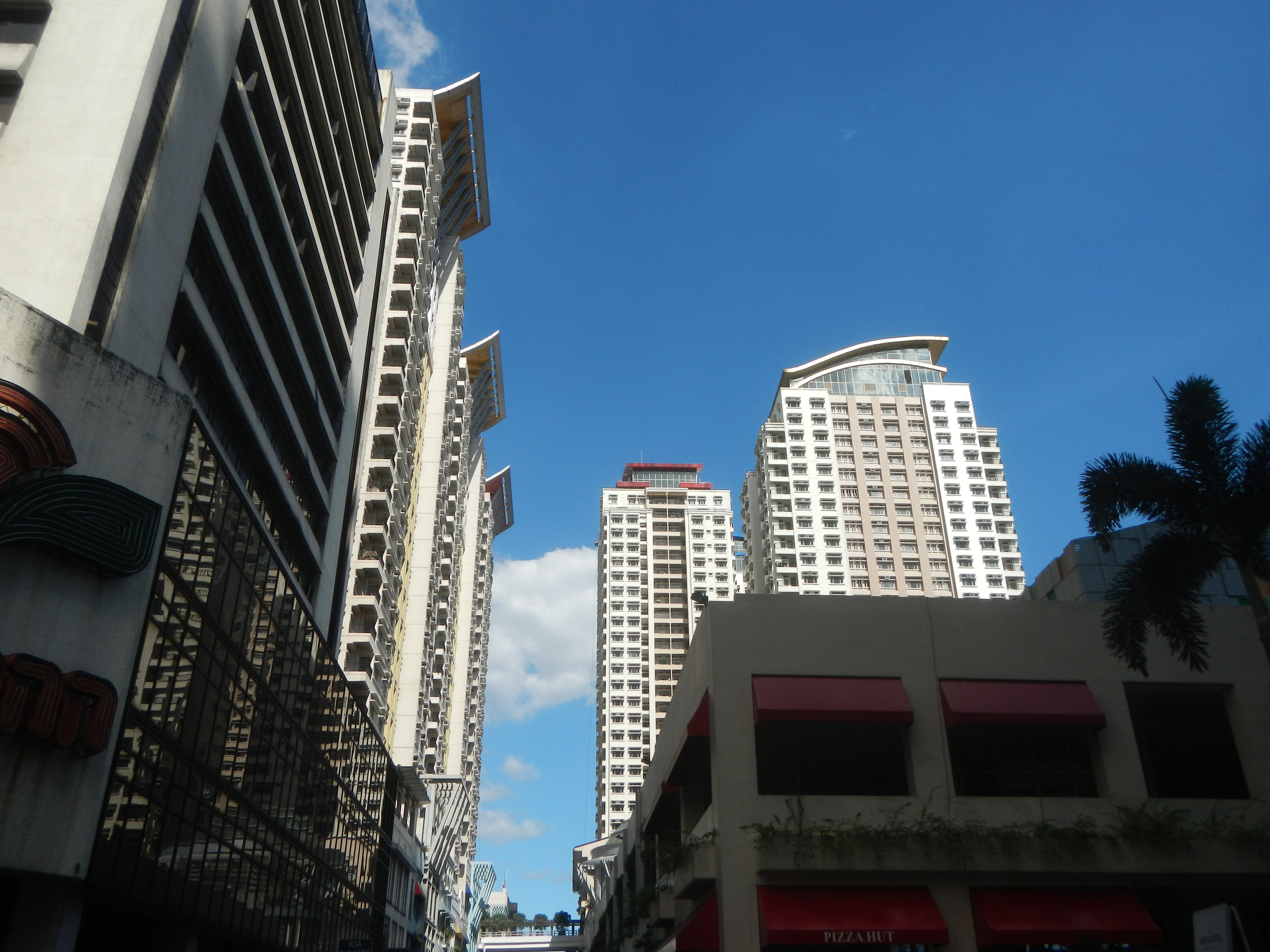
The Aurora Tower and the New Frontier Theater in the foreground, with the Manhattan Parkway and the Manhattan Parkview along Gen. Malvar Avenue

The Araneta City Bus Port, located at the Manhattan Heights complex

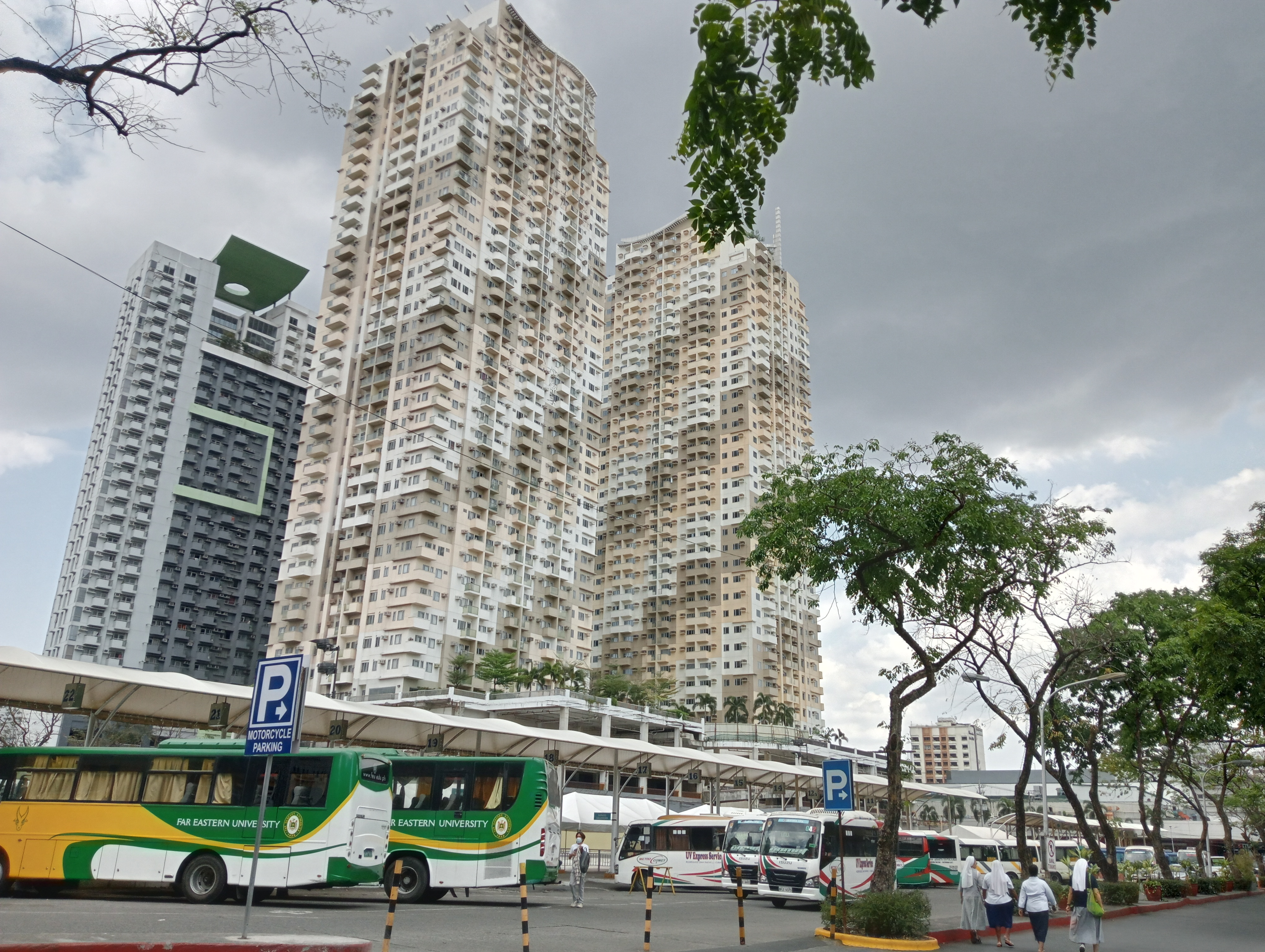
The Manhattan Plaza towers, with the Manhattan Heights Tower A in the background
