= Vivaldi Residences Davao =

Tower and the tallest building in Davao City, Philippines

- Davao

General information
- Status: Completed
- Type: Residential
- Location: C.M. Recto Street Cor. R. Magsaysay Avenue, Davao City, Philippines
- Groundbreaking: 2015
- Completed: 2024
- Opened: 2024
- Owner: Euro Towers International
- Landlord: Euro Towers International

Height
- Height: 121 m (396.98 ft)
- Top floor: 36

Technical details
- Floor count: 36

The Vivaldi Residences Davao is a 36-storey residential tower located at the corner of C.M. Recto Street and R. Magsaysay Avenue in Davao City, Philippines. Upon completion, this building will be the tallest in Davao City as well as in Mindanao.

== Construction ==
The building's foundation works was commenced in June 2015. The bored piles were laid by Advanced Foundation Construction Systems. The foundation of the building measures 60 metres (200 ft) below and the land of the building covers 1,004 square metres (10,810 sq ft). By March 2016, the foundation works is 95 percent complete with 67 out of 70 bored piles already laid. The foundation work alone costs around ₱120 million. The whole Vivaldi Residenes Davao project is projected to cost around ₱1 billion. The building is scheduled to be completed in April 2018.

== Architecture and design ==
Vivaldi Residences Davao will have 36 floors and will rise 120 metres (390 ft) above ground making it among the highest buildings in Davao City.

== 2025 Davao Oriental earthquakes ==
Vivaldi Residences Davao received a yellow tag by OCBO, which means that its use would be restricted until the moderate structural or non-structural damage discovered during inspection underwent repairs, and the building would be declared fit for full re-occupancy.

== See also ==
- Vivaldi Residences Cubao
