= Vivaldi Residences Cubao =

Tower in Quezon City, Philippines

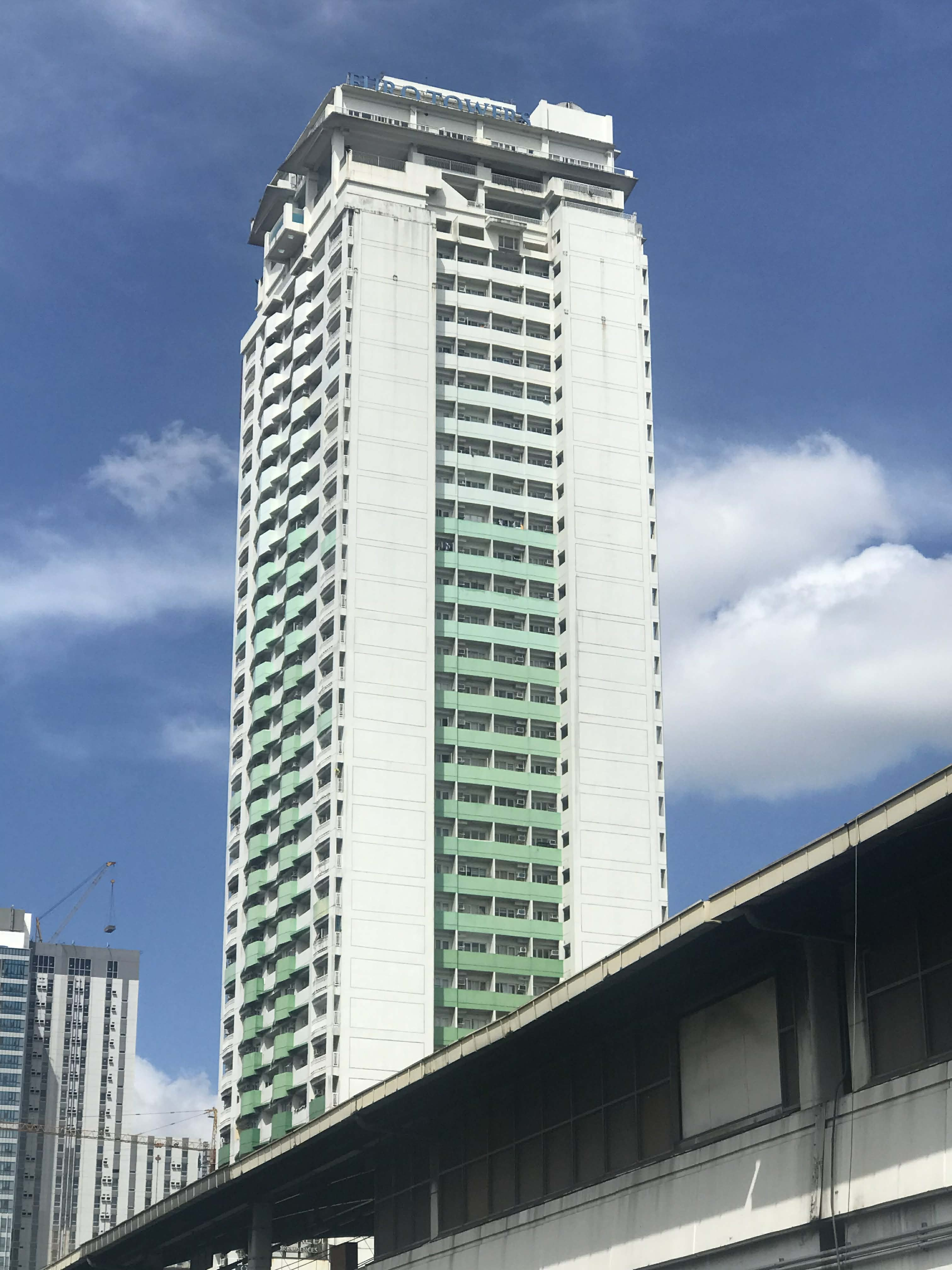

General information
- Status: Completed
- Classification: Mixed-use
- Location: 628 EDSA cor. Aurora Blvd., Cubao, Quezon City, Philippines
- Groundbreaking: October 2011
- Topped-out: October 2014
- Completed: July 2016
- Owner: Euro Towers International Inc.
- Landlord: Araneta Group

Height
- Height: 129 metres (423 ft)

Technical details
- Floor count: 40

Design and construction
- Architect: Arturo R. Matubang
- Developer: Euro Towers International Inc.
- Structural engineer: JDMenguito Builders.

Website
- vivaldiresidences.com

The Vivaldi Residences Cubao is a 40-storey mixed use residential, condotel tower located at the corner of EDSA and Aurora Blvd. in Quezon City, Philippines. The tower was named after Antonio Vivaldi, and is both owned and developed by Euro Towers International Inc. serving as the company's first high-rise residential project in Metro Manila.

== History ==
The tower as seen from the EDSA-Aurora Boulevard Overpass

Before the construction of the project was established, the tower formerly sits on the former Ocean Theater, an old movie theater which opened in the area in the 1970s, and was closed in the 1990s, due to rising competition from malls, equipped with movie theaters and additional retail stores within Metro Manila. The theater was eventually auctioned for ownership in 2008, at a price tag of ₱58 million, with many companies bidding for the ownership of the property. The companies involved in the bidding for the property were SM Prime, First View Corp., and Eurotel. On November 18, 2008, Eurotel won the sale for the property, offering ₱91.8 million, after then-Mayor Feliciano Belmonte Jr. and other Quezon City officials voted on the company's bet, beating SM Prime's ₱80 million and First View's ₱110 million bets, while the Araneta Group remains as the project's landlord, as the project sits within the vicinity of the Araneta City.

The Ocean Theater was demolished in 2009 to give way for the high-rise project, while the project broke ground in October 2011, before topping off in October 2014. On May 29, 2015, the tower's crane hook snagged off, and hit the tower's rooftop, while four construction workers secured the crane hook, to avoid it from falling to the ground and cause casualties. Due to the incident, the tower's construction was delayed to its planned original opening in December 2015, but was subsequently completed in July 2016, as tenants and residents began occupying the building.

== Architecture and design ==
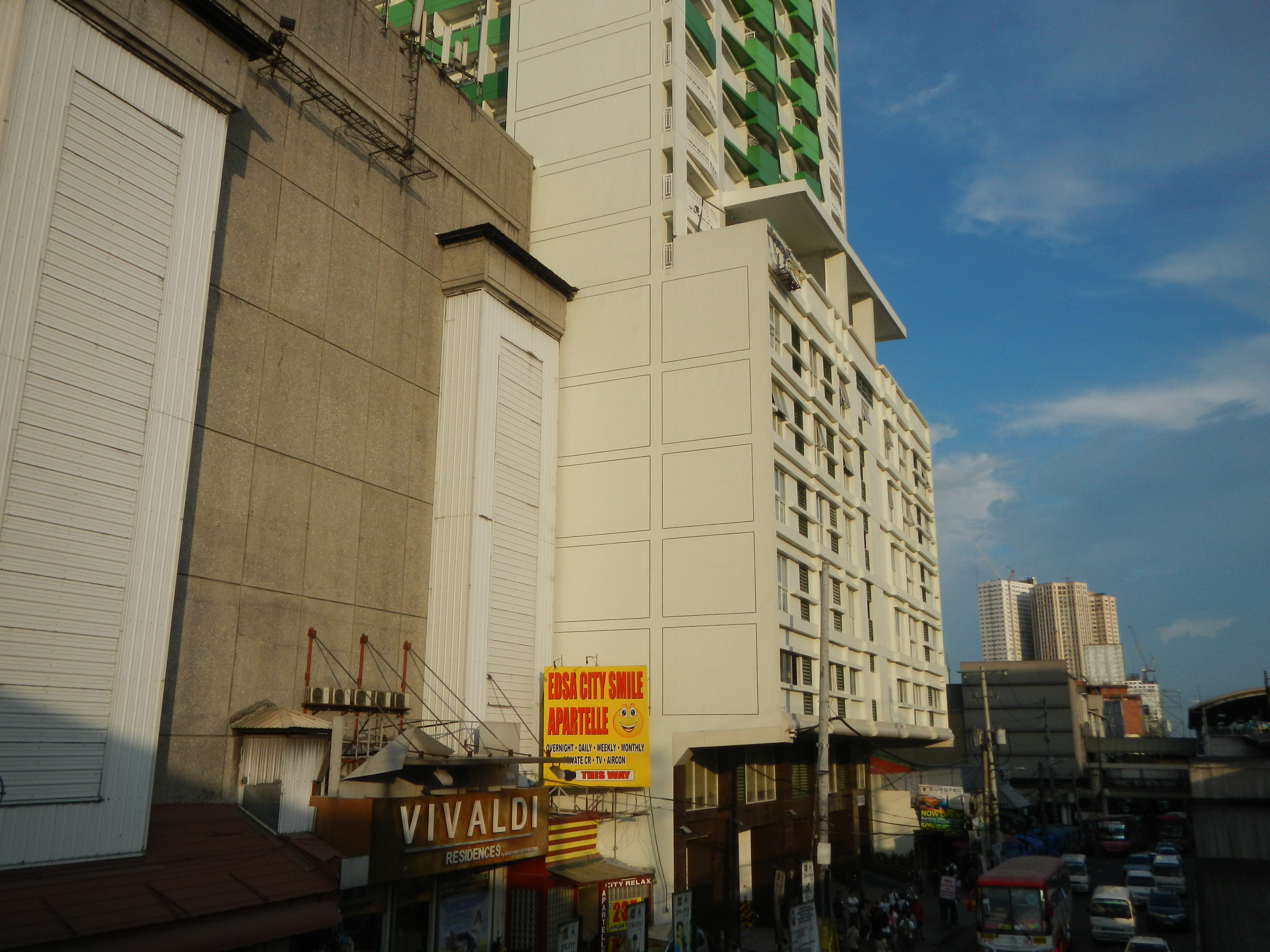
The tower's facade of its first sixteen floors, taken from the EDSA-Aurora Boulevard Overpass

The building was inspired by European architecture with urban cosmopolitan tastes in a transit-oriented development due to the tower's close proximity to key transport networks. The tower was designed by a team led by Arturo R. Matubang, along with R.I.M.A. Partners and Co., while Rogelio I. Menguito of JDMenguito Builders is the project's Structural Designer. The company also tapped IIIDEAS Furniture & Furnishing Trading of Jean Paul De La Rosa was involved in the interior design of the building. Oscar S, Roque & Associates serves as the tower's mechanical and fire safety engineering firm, while Covelite Construction & Design Services is the project's electrical design engineering firm, and TJP Design Konsult was in charge of the project's plumbing and sanitary design.

The structure was first to be issued a Green Building Certificate by the Quezon City local government, as the tower features energy-efficient and water-saving systems. The tower is also the only condominium in the Philippines as of September 2014 with a cantilevered pool situated in its topmost floor. The building also houses Eurotel on its first floors, which opened in October 2016.

== Features ==
The tower features a wide range of amenities located along the tower's topmost floors, such as a fitness gym, a multi-purpose function hall, a jogging path, a sky garden, and a cantilevered swimming pool. The tower also has commercial and office spaces on the tower's first two floors.

Eurotel, a local 3-star budget hotel chain, serves as the tower's hotel component and occupies the tower's first seven floors. The hotel opened its doors in 2016 after formerly occupying the former Eurotel building located along the corner of General Roxas and General Araneta Avenues, which is currently occupied by Hotel DreamWorld. The hotel has a total of 99 rooms and ranges from the Euro Suite, Standard Room, Standard Twin Room, Studio Room, Family Room, and the Euro Suite 2 Rooms. The hotel also features amenities such as a spa and parking spaces for the hotel's guests.

== Location ==
Situated within the Araneta City in Cubao, it is also accessible to major areas of Metro Manila via the Manila Metro Rail Transit System Line 3 (Line 3) and the Manila Light Rail Transit System Line 2 (Line 2) train stations. The tower is also accessible to nearby transport terminals of buses, jeepney and UV Express vehicles.

== See also ==
- Vivaldi Residences Davao
