= Automatic Centre =

Defunct appliance and electronics store in the Philippines

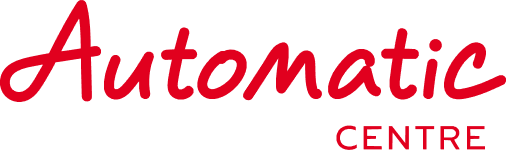

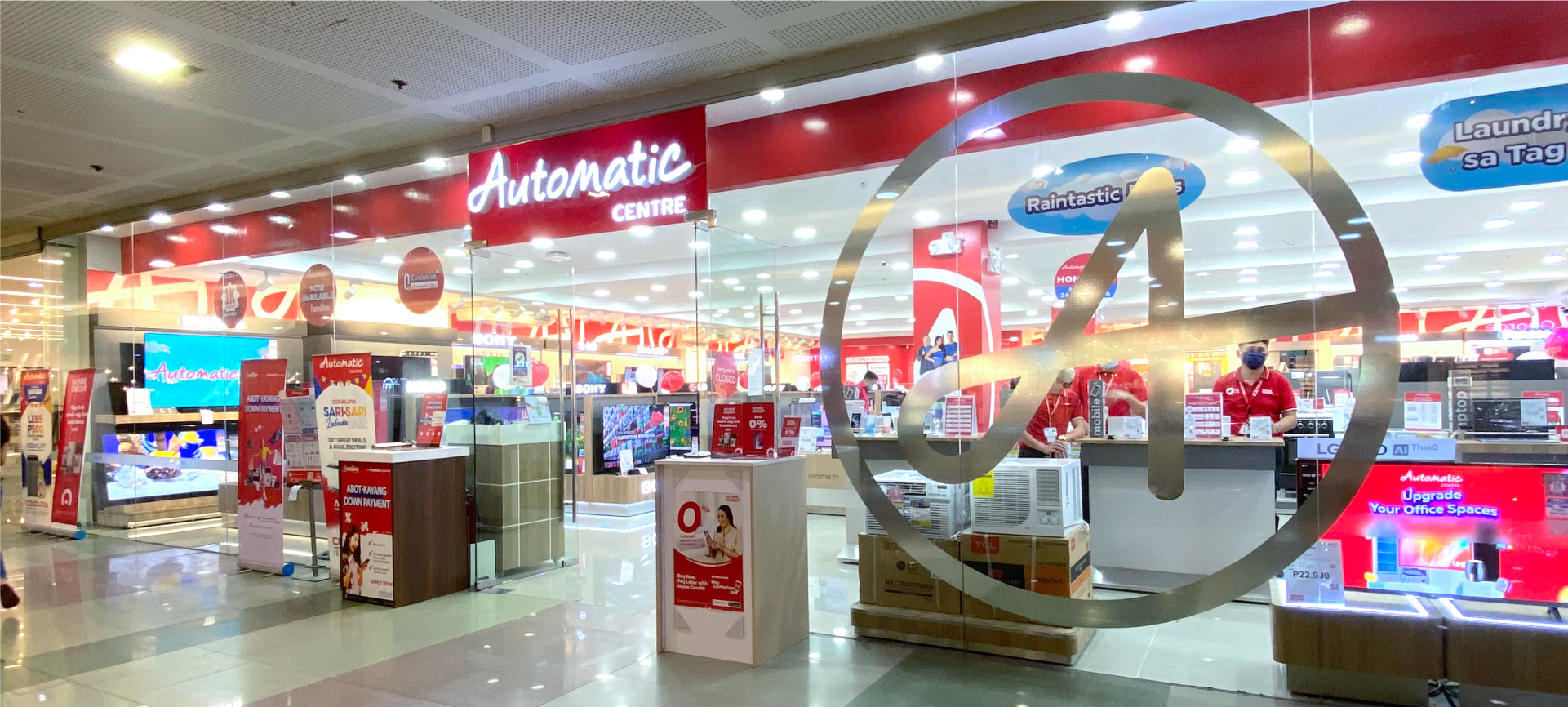
- Store façade in SM North EDSA, Quezon City
- Product type: Appliance and electronics retail store chain
- Introduced: 1948; 78 years ago by Benito Lim
- Markets: Philippines

Automatic Centre is a appliance and electronics retail store chain in the Philippines. Started in 1948 by Benito Lim, the store chain has grown to maintaining multiple outlets in Metro Manila.

== History ==
Automatic Centre was established by Benito Lim in 1948. It was a family business by the Lims, with sons Wilson and Samie founding Abenson and Blims Fine Furniture. Automatic Centre was managed under Automatic Appliances Inc. (AAI).

The chain shutdown all of its stores on October 10, 2021 due to losses caused by the COVID-19 pandemic. The Lim family has sought third parties interested to take over the Automatic Centre brand which had about 20 stores in Metro Manila at the time of its closure.

However by October 2022, Automatic Centre has reopened 19 of its stores with an updated brand logo.
