= 2025 Marikina local elections =

10th City elections in Marikina

- May 12, 2025
- Registered: 315,980 ▲21.18 pp
- Turnout: 81.79% ▼6.13 pp
- Mayoral election
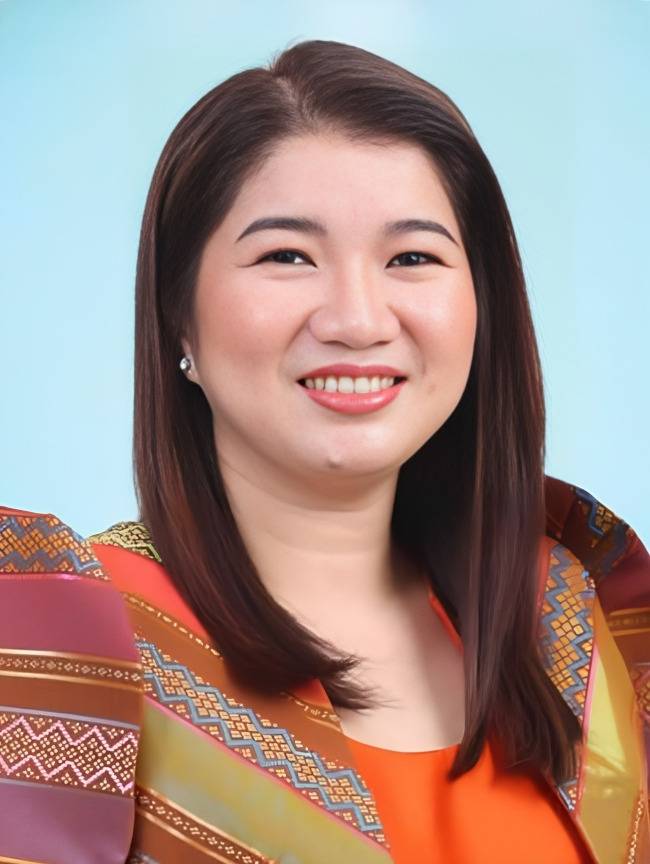

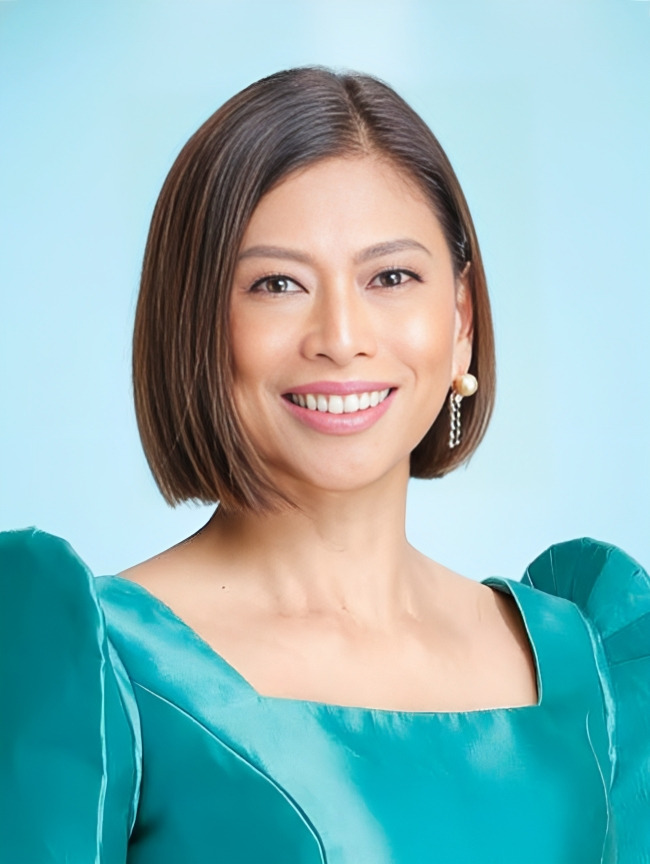
Candidate	Maan Teodoro	Stella Quimbo
Party	NUP	Lakas
Alliance	Marikina City	Bagong Marikina
Popular vote	142,814	111,420
Percentage	56.17%	43.83%
Mayor before election
Marcelino Teodoro (Note: Suspended since March 25, 2025. Rommel Acuña serves as acting mayor.)
NUP
Elected mayor
Maan Teodoro
NUP
- Vice mayoral election
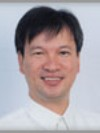

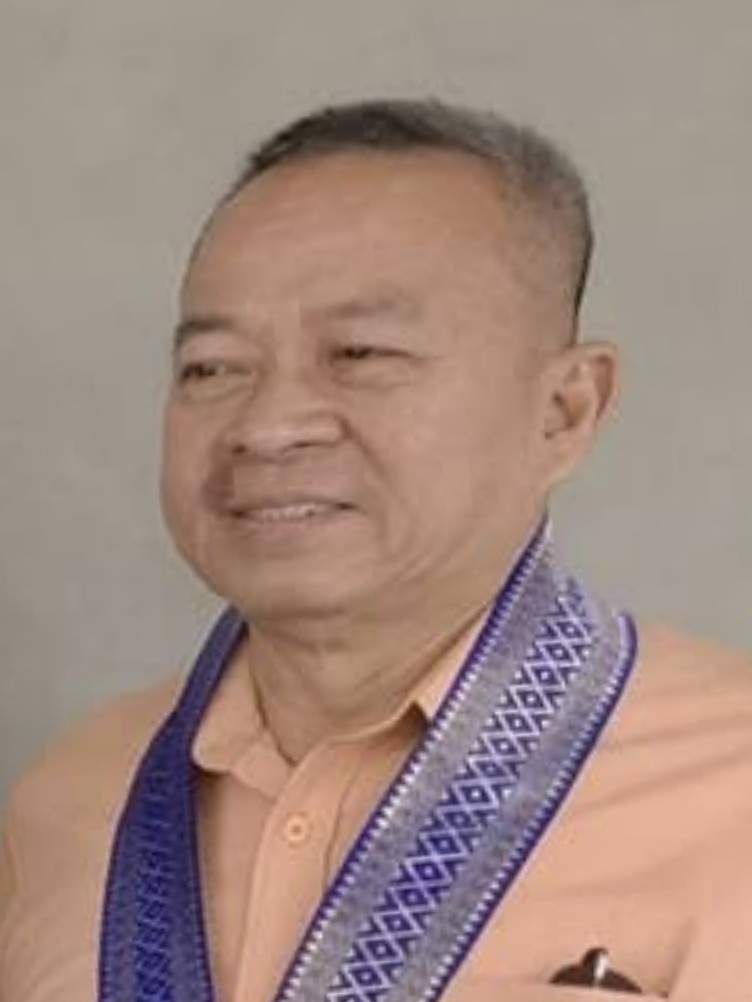
Candidate	Del de Guzman	Marion Andres
Party	Lakas	NUP
Alliance	Bagong Marikina	Marikina City
Popular vote	125,573	118,038
Percentage	50.86%	47.81%
Vice Mayor before election
Marion Andres (Note: Suspended since March 25, 2025. Ronnie Acuña serves as acting vice mayor.)
NUP
Elected Vice Mayor
Del de Guzman
Lakas
- City Council election

16 of 18 seats in the Marikina City Council 10 seats needed for a majority
	Majority party	Minority party
Party	NUP	Lakas
Alliance	Marikina City	Bagong Marikina
Last election	Did not participate	Did not participate
Seats before	11 (Note: All members suspended since March 25, 2025.)	2
Seats won	10	5
Seat change	▼1	▲3
Popular vote	854,356	735,452
Percentage	49.98%	43.02%

Local elections were held in Marikina on May 12, 2025, as part of the 2025 Philippine general election. The electorate elected a mayor, a vice mayor, sixteen members of the Marikina City Council, and two district representatives to the House of Representatives of the Philippines. The officials elected assumed their respective offices on June 30, 2025, for a three-year term.

Representative Maan Teodoro and former mayor Del de Guzman were elected mayor and vice mayor respectively, defeating their opponents Representative Stella Quimbo and incumbent vice mayor Marion Andres. Teodoro's Team Marikina City under the National Unity Party retained a majority in the city council, but saw their seat share decline. Quimbo's Team Bagong Marikina under Lakas–CMD remained in the minority while gaining three seats. Outgoing mayor Marcelino Teodoro and former Representative Miro Quimbo were elected as the representatives for the first and second districts respectively, both being elected to a fourth nonconsecutive term.

The election was held during the suspension of the outgoing Teodoro administration. The campaign period was defined by fierce competition between the two coalitions. Major local issues throughout the contest included the local debt and support for the local shoe industry. Allegations of vote buying through the misuse of welfare programs were rife throughout the campaign, as well as the proliferation of disinformation.

== Background ==
In the 2022 elections, Marcelino Teodoro and Marion Andres were elected to the mayoralty and vice mayoralty respectively, both winning with wide margins against their closest opponents. Their coalition, Team MarCy, attained outright control of the city council, winning 14 of the 16 elective seats in the legislature. Nationally, a majority of the Marikina electorate voted for the UniTeam ticket of Bongbong Marcos and Sara Duterte for president and vice president, respectively. In 2025, there were 315,980 voters registered in the city.

=== Suspension of the administration ===
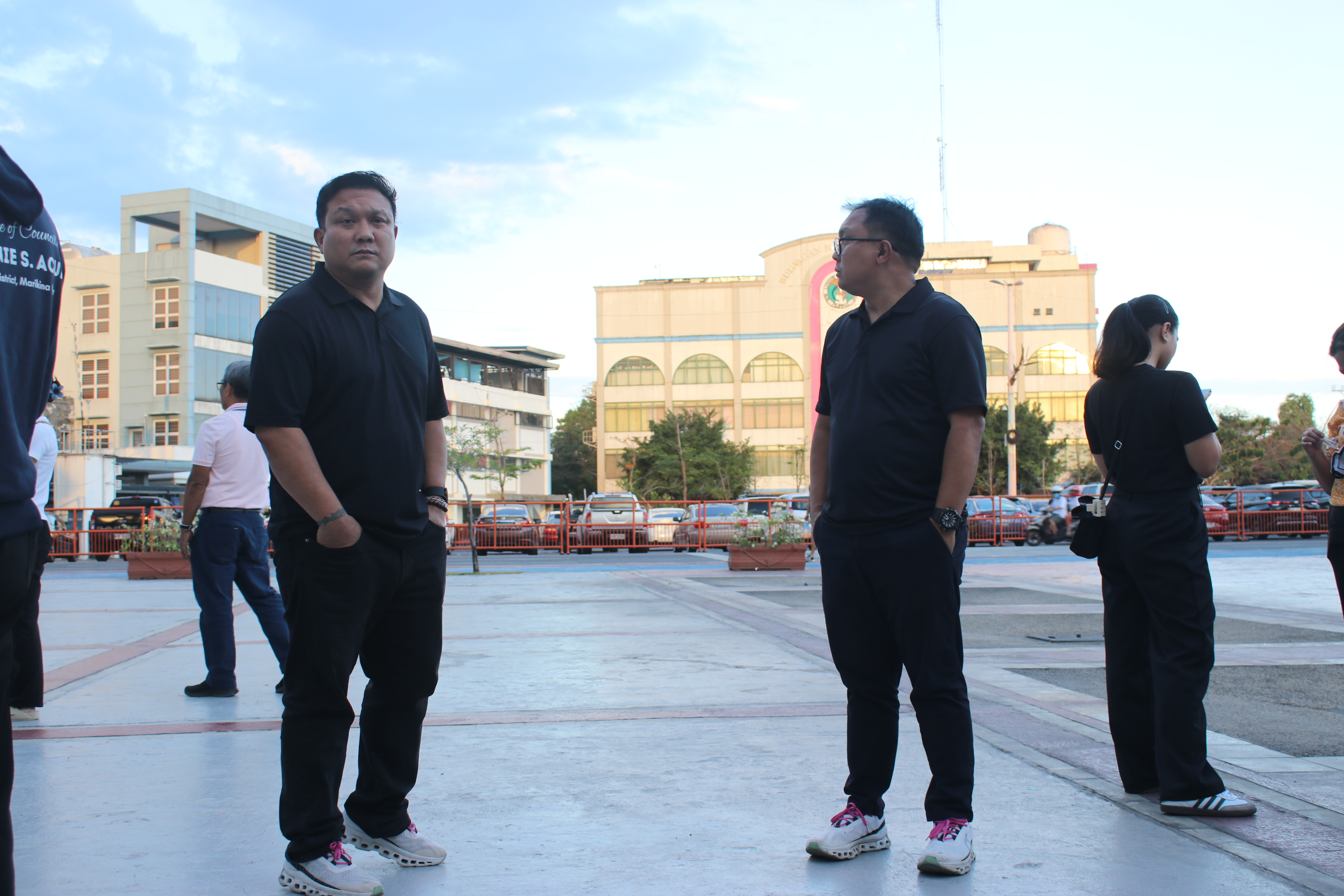
Councilors Rommel (right) and Ronnie Acuña (left) have served as acting mayor and vice mayor respectively, following Teodoro's suspension.

On May 15, 2024, a technical malversation complaint was filed against Teodoro and three other city officials before the Office of the Ombudsman. The complaint claimed that a 2024 budgetary ordinance passed by the Marikina City Council allocated ₱130 million in PhilHealth reimbursements to "IT equipment, repair and maintenance of infrastructure and/or donations," rather than the improvement the city's healthcare system, violating a provision of the Universal Health Care Act. Teodoro's camp derided the complaint as a "mere product of misapprehension and misunderstanding of the facts." Mayors for Good Governance, a group of local executives, deemed the complaints politically motivated and described Teodoro as transparent and accountable.

On March 25, 2025, three days before the start of the campaign period, the Office of the Ombudsman issued a preventive suspension order against Teodoro, Andres, and their allies in the city council, in effect for six months, as a response to the complaint. The constitutional body deemed that there was "strong evidence showing their guilt" which warranted the removal of the suspended officials from office, hence their granting of the suspension order. In response, the Department of the Interior and Local Government appointed twin councilors Rommel and Ronnie Acuña as acting mayor and vice mayor, respectively, to ensure the continuity of government operations during the suspension.

Teodoro's camp condemned the suspension as "a broader effort to derail" his coalition's campaign. The Mayors for Good Governance urged the office to conduct a "just and transparent investigation" on the complaint against Teodoro.

== Coalitions ==
The filing of certificates of candidacy were conducted from October 1 to 8, 2024, from which local slates were formalized and announced.

=== Team Bagong Marikina ===
Representative Stella Quimbo and her husband Miro, a former representative, ran for mayor and representative respectively under Team Bagong Marikina (lit. 'Team New Marikina'; also stylized as Team Bagong Marik1na) which was affiliated with Lakas–CMD and was hence nominally part of the Alyansa para sa Bagong Pilipinas. During the campaign, Quimbo's coalition endorsed Senator Koko Pimentel as their candidate for representative in the first district.

=== Team Marikina City ===
Incumbent Mayor Marcelino Teodoro and his allies have been affiliated with the United Nationalist Alliance since 2022, following his ouster from the Nationalist People's Coalition after a verbal row with former mayor and former Representative Bayani Fernando over the aftermath of Typhoon Ulysses two years prior. With Teodoro term-limited, his wife Representative Maan led the administration ticket. The administration contested the election as Team Marikina City, being affiliated with the National Unity Party, and being nominally part of the wider Alyansa para sa Bagong Pilipinas.

=== Coalitions dissolved before the election ===
==== Teodoro–Pimentel ====
Following the landslide victory of his Team MarCy coalition in 2022, Teodoro's administration has partnered with Senator Koko Pimentel and his wife, diplomat Kathryna, in implementing projects in the city, including a health caravan in April 2024. After Teodoro filed to run in the first district for the elections to the House of Representatives, Pimentel followed suit, pitting the two together and rendering the partnership moot.

In an October 2024 interview, amid the filing of the certificates of candidacies, the former Pimentel revealed that he and Teodoro had agreed that he would run for representative in the first district while Teodoro would run in the second after forming informal arrangements from December 2023 to February 2024. In response, Teodoro clarified that Pimentel's camp left the alliance on July 28, leaving the administration without a candidate in the first district, hence his decision to contest the congressional seat there.

== Tickets ==
Candidates italicized indicate incumbents seeking re-election.

=== Administration coalition ===
Team Marikina City
Position	#	Candidate	Party
Mayor	2.	Maan Teodoro	NUP
Vice mayor	1.	Marion Andres	NUP
Representative (1st district)	2.	Marcelino Teodoro	NUP
Representative (2nd district)	3.	Donn Favis	NUP
Councilor (1st district)	5.	Jojo Banzon	NUP
Councilor (1st district)	6.	Adams Bernadino	NUP
Councilor (1st district)	7.	Cloyd Casimiro	NUP
Councilor (1st district)	8.	Kate de Guzman	NUP
Councilor (1st district)	13.	Hazel Golangco	NUP
Councilor (1st district)	16.	Ginny Santos Pioquinto	NUP
Councilor (1st district)	19.	Rossette Sarmiento	NUP
Councilor (1st district)	20.	Pat Sicat	NUP
Councilor (2nd district)	4.	Marife Dayao	NUP
Councilor (2nd district)	7.	Jaren Feliciano	NUP
Councilor (2nd district)	14.	Estelita Makiramdam	NUP
Councilor (2nd district)	16.	Michael Mojica	NUP
Councilor (2nd district)	17.	Angel Nuñez	NUP
Councilor (2nd district)	19.	Larry Punzalan	NUP
Councilor (2nd district)	21.	Ruben Reyes	NUP
Councilor (2nd district)	29.	Elvis Tolentino	NUP

=== Opposition coalition ===
Team Bagong Marikina
Position	#	Candidate	Party
Mayor	1.	Stella Quimbo	Lakas
Vice mayor	2.	Del de Guzman	Lakas
Representative (1st district)	1.	Koko Pimentel (Note: Guest candidate)	Nacionalista
Representative (2nd district)	4.	Miro Quimbo	Lakas
Councilor (1st district)	1.	Rommel Acuña	Lakas
Councilor (1st district)	2.	Carl Africa	Lakas
Councilor (1st district)	10.	Medick Ferrer	Lakas
Councilor (1st district)	11.	Sam Ferriol	Independent
Councilor (1st district)	12.	Bruce Fortuno	Lakas
Councilor (1st district)	17.	Ces Reyes	Lakas
Councilor (1st district)	18.	Vic "Tambuli" Sabiniano	Lakas
Councilor (1st district)	21.	Jasper So	Lakas
Councilor (2nd district)	1.	Ronnie Acuña	Lakas
Councilor (2nd district)	2.	Ziffred Ancheta	Lakas
Councilor (2nd district)	3.	Vincent Calanoga	Lakas
Councilor (2nd district)	5.	Miguel De Guzman	Lakas
Councilor (2nd district)	6.	Yuri Edullan	Lakas
Councilor (2nd district)	13.	Bong Magtubo	Lakas
Councilor (2nd district)	27.	Rizza Teope	Lakas
Councilor (2nd district)	30.	Indigo Valentin	Lakas

=== Other candidates ===
Kilos Pagbabago
Position	#	Candidate	Party
Representative (1st district)	1.	Koko Pimentel	Nacionalista
Councilor (1st district)	15.	Imee Mascariña	Independent

Candidates not in tickets
Position	#	Candidate	Party
Vice mayor	3.	Annie Retes	Independent
Representative (2nd district)	1.	Mauro Arce	Independent
Representative (2nd district)	2.	Jose Jaime Enage	Independent
Councilor (1st district)
Councilor (1st district)	3.	Jahn Alejaga	Independent
Councilor (1st district)	4.	Rosie Aquino	Independent
Councilor (1st district)	9.	Benedicto dela Cruz	Independent
Councilor (1st district)	14.	Tope Ilagan	Independent
Councilor (2nd district)	8.	Ed Gillera	Independent
Councilor (2nd district)	9.	Ram Haveria Jr.	Independent
Councilor (2nd district)	10.	Jimsen Jison	Independent
Councilor (2nd district)	11.	Beny Madrigal	Independent
Councilor (2nd district)	12.	Marvie Madrigal	Independent
Councilor (2nd district)	15.	Rene Mira	Makabayan
Councilor (2nd district)	18.	Jep Ordoñez	Independent
Councilor (2nd district)	20.	Jenilyn Retes	Independent
Councilor (2nd district)	22.	Susan Romero	Independent
Councilor (2nd district)	24.	Dindo Rosales	Independent
Councilor (2nd district)	24.	Josephine Sandiego	Independent
Councilor (2nd district)	25.	Patricia Senerata	Independent
Councilor (2nd district)	26.	Nico Shahin Moghaddam	Independent
Councilor (2nd district)	28.	Greg Teves	Independent
Councilor (2nd district)	31.	George Villanueva	Independent
Councilor (2nd district)	32.	Cris Vitangcol	Independent

== Campaign ==
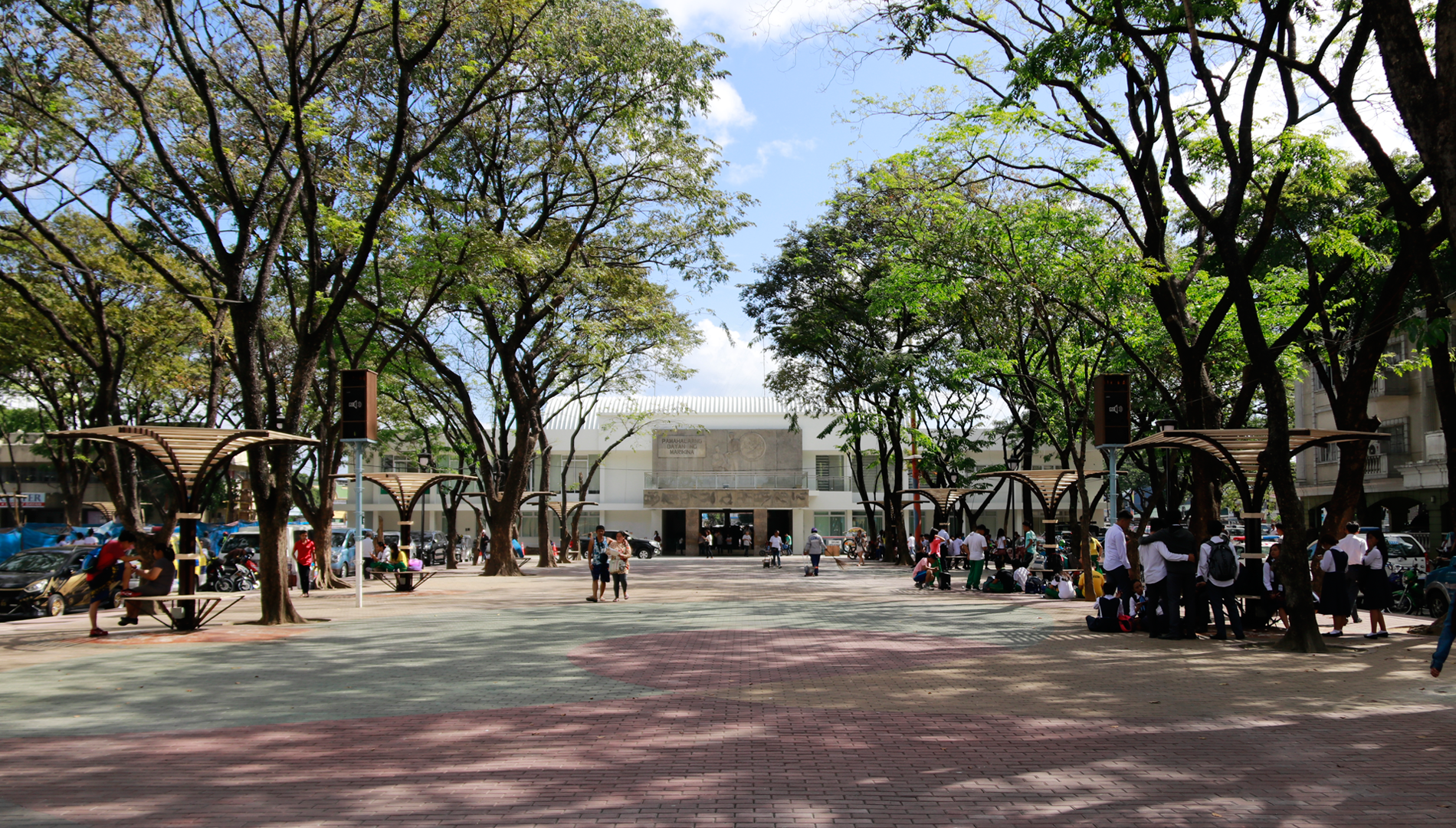
The Marikina Freedom Park in Santa Elena, a perennial site of political events.

The campaign period for local elections began on March 28, 2025, and ended on May 10. The contest was highly competitive between the two major political factions in local politics—the National Unity Party-affiliated Teodoro camp and the Lakas–CMD-affiliated Quimbo camp. With each faction led by couples, James Patrick Cruz of Rappler has described Marikina as being under a "conjugal leadership," regardless of the election's outcome. During the campaign, the candidates and coalitions held motorcades in support of their candidacies.

The election period has been defined as being more fiercely contested than past elections, owing to the legal battles that characterized its run.

=== Campaign issues ===
==== Support for the local shoe industry ====
Organizations and unions including the Philippine Chamber of Commerce and Industry have expressed disappointment for the "inaction" of past administrations in addressing the concerns stemming from the stagnant Marikina Shoe Industry, which, while ubiquitous, has been declining since trade liberalization in the late 20th century. In contrast, the Marikina-based Philippine Footwear Federation Incorporated criticized media outlets for not reaching out to them in their articles discussing the shoe industry's contemporary performance. The organization deemed their reports unbalanced against the incumbent local government, whose programs and assistance they deemed were central to an increase in their income and market reach.

=== Messaging and themes ===
==== Team Bagong Marikina ====
Team Bagong Marikina's platform revolved around managing the city's debt, carrying out their vision of transforming Marikina into a "business-friendly" start-up city, and attending to the needs of the city's health centers. The coalition aims to cut business taxes and secure adequate funding from the national government to alleviate the city's ₱3.6 billion outstanding debt and to fund local projects. Moreover, the coalition expressed support for the Wawa Dam project as a means of flood control and attracting businesses and investments into the city.

In an interview with the Philippine Daily Inquirer, Stella criticized the incumbent administration for "blocking" the programs she pushed in her capacity as a representative and cited "political survival" as a motivation for seeking the mayoralty at the same time as her husband Miro's congressional bid, accusing the Teodoros of attempting to erase the couple from local politics.

The Quimbo campaign was characterized by its media appearances in contrast to the Teodoros' preference for alliance-sanctioned events. Stella cited misinformation as a top concern in the campaign, having been the subject of fake graphics that circulated on social media. The Pimentel campaign in the first district has centered itself around the revival of the shoe industry, financing local initiatives that aim to boost the industry and opening public exhibitions of local products.

==== Team Marikina City ====
Team Marikina City's platform sought to make the city "climate-resilient" and more business-friendly with "digitalization" and "ease of doing business" policies. Supporters of the administration, including the Association of Clans in Marikina, have defended the Teodoros amid their legal battles, condemning their suspension as "dirty politics," regarding it as being politically motivated and slanderous. Before the campaign period began, supporters of Marcelino Teodoro gathered at the Marikina Freedom Park for a protest and prayer vigil over the mayor's suspension.

== Election-related concerns ==
=== Allegations of corruption ===
Former Presidential Spokesperson Salvador Panelo has urged Ombudsman Samuel Martires to investigate the wealth of the Quimbos, citing "unexplained wealth" reflected by luxury goods often worn by Stella. Former Governor of the Bangko Sentral ng Pilipinas Felipe Medalla, who subsequently endorsed Quimbo in the mayoral race, defended her, attributing her wealth to her consulting income from her academic career and deemed such allegations as sexist.

=== Disinformation ===
On May 12, the day of the election, a Manila resident was arrested for distributing falsified printout tabloids in Santo Niño that suggested that Marcelino Teodoro was disqualified by the Commission on Elections (COMELEC) with finality. The man arrested claimed that he was promised a cash sum for distributing the material. In response, COMELEC Chairman George Garcia warned of more misinformation surfacing on election day and cited the incident as such a case. Stella Quimbo denied any involvement with the incident and asserted that she had no reason to oppose Teodoro in the first district.

=== Politicization of welfare programs ===
==== Quimbo camp ====
"We find this alarming because we, public school teachers, are not poor or in crisis and do not fall under the usual DSWD guidelines for this kind of help."

— an anonymous teacher quoted by GMA News

"There is no adequate basis for the report, nor confirmed groups or truth. This is defamation, not legitimate journalism."

— Marikina Federation of Public School Teachers, in a subsequent statement

On April 25, alleged incidents of vote buying and abuse of state resources from the camp of Team Bagong Marikina prompted the COMELEC to issue a show-cause order against Stella and Miro Quimbo to clarify their actions on the matter. In response, the Quimbos released a joint statement denying the claims and ensuring their compliance with the order.

On April 30, a 20-year-old delivery rider died of cardiac arrest at a payout for a financial assistance program led by Stella at the Marikina Sports Center in partnership with the Department of Social Welfare and Development (DSWD). The event coordinators received criticism online for the event's conduct, alleging that the organizers prioritized damage control over proper emergency response.

On May 3, GMA Integrated News reported that a group of public school teachers in the city urged the COMELEC and the Department of Education to investigate Stella's handling of the Assistance to Individuals in Crisis Situation (AICS) program of the DSWD in her district. The teachers who requested anonymity from the site, fearing reprisal, stated that the distribution of aid under the program targeted teachers who do not satisfy the program's requirements and thus may be tantamount to vote buying. The following day, the Marikina Federation of Public School Teachers distanced itself from the reported complaint and criticized the article for its use of anonymous sources, condemning the report as "irresponsible reporting". The article itself was subsequently removed from the news site. On May 7, a principal and a faculty president confirmed that the payout took place from April 21 to 23, both of which stated that they had verified the project after being persuaded that the project was "for their fellow teachers."

Koko Pimentel has been criticized online for appearing at an orientation for the TUPAD program of the Department of Labor and Employment in Parang on the first day of the campaign period.

==== Teodoro camp ====
On May 5, a member of a local media community, supported by eight signed affidavits, filed a complaint at the COMELEC alleging that Maan Teodoro engaged in vote buying during her campaign sorties. The COMELEC subsequently issued a show cause order against Maan and Marcelino Teodoro on May 5 to clarify their actions on the matter. Maan subsequently denied the allegations, deeming it politically motivated. She expressed skepticism over the complaint's intentions, owing to how the claimant was a propagator of pro-Quimbo content on social media.

== Debates and forums ==
On January 15, 2025, Rappler announced that they will organize a public forum for candidates for the mayoralty, vice mayoralty, and Congress on February 9.

Legend
P Participated A Absent I Invited NI Not invited

Date	Organizers	Media partners	Location	Moderators	Candidates												Ref.
Date	Organizers	Media partners	Location	Moderators	For mayor			For vice mayor			For Congress						Ref.
Date	Organizers	Media partners	Location	Moderators	For mayor			For vice mayor			First district		Second district				Ref.
Date	Organizers	Media partners	Location	Moderators	Fajardo	Quimbo	Teodoro	Andres	de Guzman	Retes	Pimentel	Teodoro	Arce	Enage	Favis	Quimbo	Ref.
February 9, 2025	Rappler	N/A	Rustic Mornings, San Roque	Pia Ranada	NI	P	A	NI	P	NI	P	NI	NI	NI	NI	P	

== Mayoral election ==
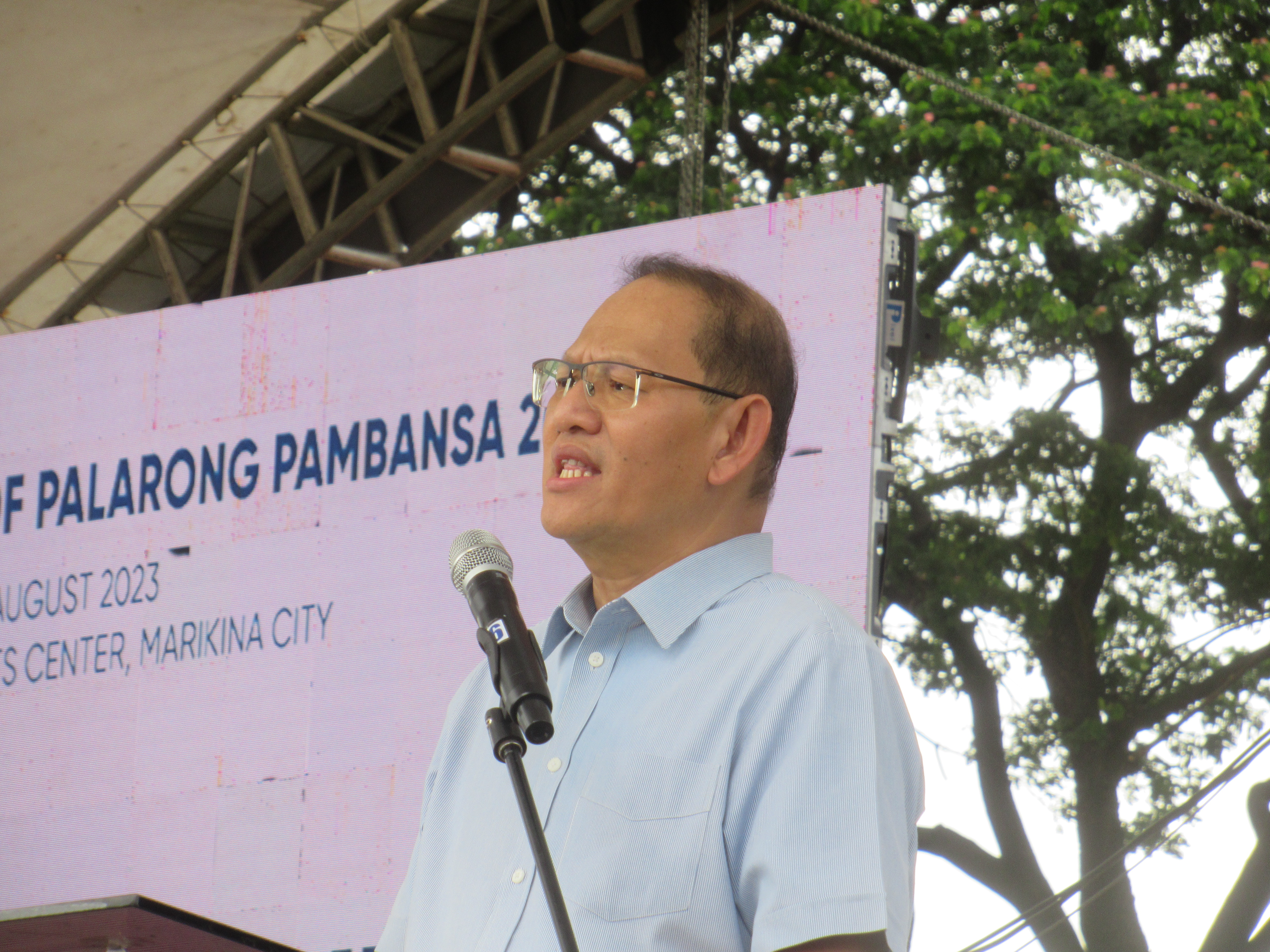
Incumbent mayor Marcelino Teodoro is term-limited.

The incumbent mayor was Marcelino Teodoro, who had served since 2016 and was reelected in 2022 with 82.08% of the vote. Teodoro was term-limited and barred from seeking re-election. Teodoro is also preventively suspended from the position, with Rommel Acuña being appointed by the Department of the Interior and Local Government as acting mayor. Acuña sought re-election to the city council. This was the first election since 2010 in which an incumbent mayor is ineligible for re-election. Cristina Chi of the Philippine Star has assessed the mayoral race as a "high-stakes" battle.

Media outlets, including the Philippine Daily Inquirer and the Manila Bulletin, have speculated that Representative Maan Teodoro will run for mayor and head the administration ticket in 2025. Teodoro formally filed her certificate of candidacy for the office on October 7, 2024.

Representative Stella Quimbo expressed her interest in running for mayor early in the race. Despite facing scrutiny with her support of the Maharlika Wealth Fund and defense of Vice President Sara Duterte's use of confidential funds during the 19th Congress, Quimbo stated that she will remain with the Liberal Party for the 2025 election. Her retention in the party was affirmed by party officials amid calls to sanction Quimbo as a party member, citing its recognition of the "freedom of expression and dissent". Quimbo's husband, Miro, confirmed her bid for the mayoralty on July 22, 2024, prior to the 2024 State of the Nation Address. She would file her candidacy on October 9 as a member of Lakas–CMD.

Former mayor Marides Fernando was in talks for a mayoral run; she ultimately declined to launch a bid for the mayoralty and subsequently endorsed Quimbo. Independent candidate Luisa Fajardo, a lawyer specializing in tribal customary who advocated for federalism, sought the office, but was not included in the ballot.

=== Candidates ===
==== Declared ====
- Stella Quimbo (Lakas), incumbent representative for the second district
- Maan Teodoro (NUP), incumbent representative for the first district

==== Withdrew ====
- Luisa Fajardo (Independent), lawyer

==== Declined ====
- Marides Fernando (Lakas), former mayor (endorsed Quimbo)

=== Endorsements ===
Stella Quimbo (Lakas)

Public officials

- Kit Belmonte, former representative from Quezon City's 6th district
- Conchita Carpio-Morales, former ombudsman of the Philippines
- Marides Fernando, former mayor of Marikina
- Felipe Medalla, former governor of the Bangko Sentral ng Pilipinas
Maan Teodoro (NUP)

Public officials

- Teresita Quintos Deles, former presidential adviser on the peace process

=== Results ===
Margin of victory of each candidate by barangay.

Teodoro narrowly defeated Quimbo. She won all barangays except for Tumana. Quimbo failed to carry her home barangay of Concepcion Dos by a slim margin.

GMA News called the mayoral race for Teodoro at 10:45 p.m. (PhST) on the night of the election, followed by ABS-CBN soon thereafter.

2025 Marikina mayoral election
Candidate	Party	Votes	%
Maan Teodoro	National Unity Party	142,814	56.17
Stella Quimbo	Lakas–CMD	111,420	43.83
Total		254,234	100.00
Valid votes		254,234	98.36
Invalid/blank votes		4,232	1.64
Total votes		258,466	100.00
Registered voters/turnout		315,980	81.80
NUP hold			

Popular vote percentage
Teodoro	56.17%
Quimbo	43.83%

==== Per barangay ====
Barangay	Quimbo		Teodoro		Total	Ref.
Barangay	Votes	%	Votes	%	Total	Ref.
Barangka	4,400	41.08	6,310	58.92	10,710	
Calumpang	4,013	40.87	5,806	59.13	9,819	
Concepcion Uno	10,104	43.35	13,206	56.65	23,310	
Concepcion Dos	7,147	49.52	7,287	50.48	14,434	
Fortune	11,047	49.88	11,101	50.12	22,148	
Industrial Valley Complex	3,592	40.20	5,344	59.80	8,936	
Jesus de la Peña	2,354	36.82	4,040	63.18	6,394	
Malanday	10,331	34.68	19,453	65.32	29,784	
Marikina Heights	8,556	46.13	9,991	53.87	18,547	
Nangka	12,247	49.80	12,343	50.20	24,590	
Parang	8,363	41.97	11,561	58.03	19,924	
San Roque	4,441	38.35	7,138	61.65	11,579	
Santa Elena	1,523	31.01	3,388	68.99	4,911	
Santo Niño	6,238	38.14	10,118	61.86	16,356	
Tañong	2,895	42.05	3,989	57.95	6,884	
Tumana	14,169	54.69	11,739	45.31	25,908	
Total	111,420	43.83	142,814	56.17	254,234	

== Vice mayoral election ==
The incumbent vice mayor was Marion Andres, who had served since 2019 and was reelected in 2022 with 69.94% of the vote. Andres previously held the office from 2001 to 2010 under the administration of Marides Fernando. As the running mate of Maan Teodoro, Andres ran for re-election to a third consecutive (sixth nonconsecutive) term. Andres is preventively suspended from the position, with Ronnie Acuña being appointed by the Department of the Interior and Local Government as acting vice mayor. Acuña sought re-election to the city council.

Del de Guzman, a former mayor and the running mate of Stella Quimbo, challenged Andres for the office. De Guzman previously held the office from 1992 to 2001 under Bayani Fernando. Independent Annie Retes, a lawyer specializing in tribal customary law, also launched a bid for the office as the running mate of Luisa Fajardo.

=== Candidates ===
==== Declared ====
- Marion Andres (NUP), incumbent vice mayor
- Del de Guzman (Lakas), former mayor
- Annie Retes (Independent), lawyer

=== Results ===
Margin of victory of each candidate by barangay.

De Guzman narrowly defeated Andres, unseating him and marking his return to the office. He won all barangays in the second district whereas Andres won all barangays in the first.

2025 Marikina vice mayoral election
Candidate	Party	Votes	%
Del de Guzman	Lakas–CMD	125,573	50.86
Marion Andres	National Unity Party	118,038	47.81
Annie Retes	Independent	3,297	1.34
Total		246,908	100.00
Valid votes		246,908	95.53
Invalid/blank votes		11,558	4.47
Total votes		258,466	100.00
Registered voters/turnout		315,980	81.80
Lakas gain			

Popular vote percentage
de Guzman	51.20%
Andres	47.47%
Retes	1.33%

==== Per barangay ====
Barangay	Andres		de Guzman		Retes		Total	Ref.
Barangay	Votes	%	Votes	%	Votes	%	Total	Ref.
Barangka	5,532	53.80	4,620	44.93	131	1.27	10,283	
Calumpang	5,555	57.68	3,978	41.31	97	1.01	9,630	
Concepcion Uno	10,366	45.37	12,191	53.36	291	1.27	22,848	
Concepcion Dos	6,069	43.06	7,805	55.38	220	1.56	14,094	
Fortune	9,049	42.10	12,206	56.78	241	1.12	21,496	
Industrial Valley Complex	4,628	54.00	3,811	44.46	132	1.54	8,571	
Jesus de la Peña	3,459	56.35	2,604	42.42	75	1.22	6,138	
Malanday	15,428	53.64	12,907	44.87	427	1.48	28,762	
Marikina Heights	8,154	45.12	9,647	53.38	272	1.51	18,073	
Nangka	9,541	39.79	14,146	59.00	291	1.21	23,978	
Parang	9,380	48.29	9,783	50.37	260	1.34	19,423	
San Roque	6,114	54.43	4,967	44.22	152	1.35	11,233	
Santa Elena	2,847	59.55	1,887	39.47	47	0.98	4,781	
Santo Niño	7,989	50.09	7,714	48.37	245	1.54	15,948	
Tañong	3,441	51.65	3,110	46.68	111	1.67	6,662	
Tumana	10,486	41.96	14,197	56.82	305	1.22	24,988	
Total	118,038	47.81	125,573	50.86	3,297	1.34	246,908	

== City Council election ==
The city council is composed of 18 members, 16 of whom are elected through plurality block voting to serve three-year terms. The councilors represent the city's two councilor districts, which are coextensive with the congressional district. Eight members being elected per district. Team MarCy, elected under the United Nationalist Alliance banner in 2022, held overall control of the council until March 26, 2025, when all councilors under the alliance were suspended, allowing the Lakas–CMD-affiliated opposition to take control of the legislature with two seats.

=== Overall results ===
Map of the districts and their corresponding seats.

Team Marikina City retained overall control of the council, winning 10 seats with 49.74% of the vote. Team Bagong Marikina, while remaining in the minority with five seats, gained three seats with 43.23% of the vote. All incumbent councilors defended their seats.

2025 Marikina City Council election
Party or alliance		Votes	%	Seats
Marikina City	National Unity Party	854,356	49.98	10
Bagong Marikina	Lakas–CMD	685,641	40.11	5
Bagong Marikina	Independent	49,811	2.91	1
Bagong Marikina	Total	735,452	43.02	6
Kilos Pagbabago	Independent	16,342	0.96	0
Makabayan		6,729	0.39	0
Independent		96,598	5.65	0
Ex officio seats				2
Total		1,709,477	100.00	18
Registered voters/turnout		315,980	–	

Vote share
Marikina City	49.98%
Bagong Marikina	43.02%
Kilos Pagbabago	0.96%
Makabayan	0.39%
Independent	5.65%

Seat share
Marikina City	55.56%
Bagong Marikina	44.44%

=== First district ===
The first district is coextensive with the first congressional district. The incumbents were Rommel Acuña, Carl Africa, Jojo Banzon, Bodjie Bernardino, Cloyd Casimiro, Kate De Guzman, Samuel Ferriol, Manny Sarmiento, all of whom were elected in 2022 under Team MarCy. Among them, Bernadino and Sarmiento were term-limited and barred from seeking re-election. Acuña left the council intraterm on March 26, 2025, to serve as acting mayor.

Banzon, Casimiro, and de Guzman sought re-election under Team Marikina City. They were joined by newcomers Adams Bernardino, Hazel Golangco, Ginny Santos Pioquinto, Rosette Sarmiento, and Pat Sicat; Pioquinto, a businesswoman, is the granddaughter of alleged gambling operator Antonio "Tony Bolok" Santos. Africa and Ferriol sought re-election under Team Bagong Marikina, together with Acuña, who sought a return to the council after his interim mayoralty, and neophytes Medick Ferrer, Bruce Fortuno, Ces Reyes, Vic "Tambuli" Sabiniano, and Jasper So.

==== Term-limited incumbents ====
- Bodjie Bernardino
- Manny Sarmiento

==== Candidates ====
===== Declared =====
- Team Bagong Marikina
  - Rommel Acuña (Lakas), acting mayor and former councilor
  - Carl Africa (Lakas), incumbent councilor
  - Medick Ferrer (Lakas)
  - Sam Ferriol (Independent)
  - Bruce Fortuno (Lakas)
  - Ces Reyes (Lakas)
  - Vic "Tambuli" Sabiniano (Lakas)
  - Jasper So (Lakas)
- Team Marikina City
  - Jojo Banzon (NUP), incumbent councilor
  - Adams Bernardino (NUP)
  - Cloyd Casimiro (NUP), incumbent councilor
  - Kate de Guzman (NUP), incumbent councilor
  - Hazel Golangco (NUP)
  - Ginny Santos Pioquinto (NUP)
  - Rossette Sarmiento (NUP)
  - Pat Sicat (NUP)
- Kilos Pagbabago
  - Imee Mascariña (Independent)
- Others
  - Jahn Alejaga (Independent)
  - Rosie Aquino (Independent)
  - Benedicto dela Cruz (Independent)
  - Tope Ilagan (Independent)

==== Results ====
Team Marikina City won five of the eight seats whereas Team Bagong Marikina won three. All re-electionist councilors defended their seats, though Acuña, who served in the previous council, failed to win a seat, placing twelfth.

2025 Marikina City Council election in the 1st district
Candidate	Party or alliance		Votes	%
Kate de Guzman (incumbent)	Marikina City	National Unity Party	62,268	59.79
Ces Reyes	Bagong Marikina	Lakas–CMD	56,990	54.72
Pat Sicat	Marikina City	National Unity Party	55,341	53.13
Sam Ferriol	Bagong Marikina	Independent	49,811	47.82
Cloyd Casimiro (incumbent)	Marikina City	National Unity Party	48,115	46.20
Jojo Banzon (incumbent)	Marikina City	National Unity Party	46,673	44.81
Ginny Santos Pioquinto	Marikina City	National Unity Party	43,113	41.39
Carl Africa (incumbent)	Bagong Marikina	Lakas–CMD	40,745	39.12
Jasper So	Bagong Marikina	Lakas-CMD	35,951	34.52
Hazel Golangco	Marikina City	National Unity Party	35,795	34.37
Rommel Acuña	Bagong Marikina	Lakas-CMD	35,138	33.74
Roset-Tarangka Sarmiento	Marikina City	National Unity Party	34,985	33.59
Adams Bernardino	Marikina City	National Unity Party	34,725	33.34
Medick Ferrer	Bagong Marikina	Lakas–CMD	31,571	30.31
Bruce Fortuno	Bagong Marikina	Lakas–CMD	30,970	29.74
VJ Tambuli Sabinano	Bagong Marikina	Lakas–CMD	22,428	21.53
Tope Ilagan	Independent		16,504	15.85
Imee Mascariña	Kilos Pagbabago	Independent	16,342	15.69
Rosie Aquino	Independent		5,194	4.99
Benedicto dela Cruz	Independent		3,711	3.56
Jahn Alejaga	Independent		3,585	3.44
Total			709,955	100.00

===== Per coalition =====
2025 Marikina City Council election in the 1st district
Party or alliance		Votes	%	Seats
National Unity Party		361,015	50.85	5
Bagong Marikina	Lakas–CMD	253,793	35.75	2
Bagong Marikina	Independent	49,811	7.02	1
Bagong Marikina	Total	303,604	42.76	3
Kilos Pagbabago	Independent	16,342	2.30	0
Independent		28,994	4.08	0
Total		709,955	100.00	8

Vote share
Marikina City	50.85%
Bagong Marikina	42.76%
Kilos Pagbabago	2.30%
Independent	4.08%

Seat share
Marikina City	62.50%
Bagong Marikina	37.50%

=== Second district ===
The second district is coextensive with the second congressional district. The incumbents were Ronnie Acuña, Marife Dayao, Levy De Guzman, Donn Favis, Bong Magtubo, Angelito Nuñez, Larry Punzalan, and Elvis Tolentino, all of whom were elected in 2022, with a majority of members affiliated with Team MarCy, and a minority—composed of Acuña and Magtubo—being affiliated with Team Performance. Among them, De Guzman and Favis were term-limited. Acuña left the council intraterm on March 26, 2025, to serve as acting vice mayor.

Dayao, Nuñez, Punzalan, and Tolentino ran for re-election under Team Marikina City, being joined by newcomers Jaren Feliciano, Estelita Makiramdam, Michael Mojica and Bogs Reyes. Magtubo sought re-election under Team Bagong Marikina together with Acuña, who sought a return to the council after his interim vice mayoralty, and neophytes Ziffred Ancheta, Vincent Calanoga, Miguel De Guzman, Yuri Edullan, Rizza Teope, and Indigo Valentin.

==== Term-limited incumbents ====
- Levy De Guzman
- Donn Favis, running for representative in the second district

==== Candidates ====
===== Declared =====
- Team Bagong Marikina
  - Ronnie Acuña (Lakas), acting vice mayor and former councilor
  - Ziffred Ancheta (Lakas), former barangay captain of Tumana and candidate for vice mayor in 2022
  - Vincent Calanoga (Lakas)
  - Miguel De Guzman (Lakas)
  - Yuri Edullan (Lakas)
  - Bong Magtubo (Lakas), incumbent councilor
  - Rizza Teope (Lakas)
  - Indigo Valentin (Lakas)
- Team Marikina City
  - Marife Dayao (NUP), incumbent councilor
  - Jaren Feliciano (NUP)
  - Estelita Makiramdam (NUP)
  - Michael Mojica (NUP)
  - Angel Nuñez (NUP), incumbent councilor
  - Larry Punzalan (NUP), incumbent councilor
  - Bogs Reyes (NUP), incumbent councilor
  - Elvis Tolentino (NUP), incumbent councilor
- Others
  - Ed Gillera (Independent)
  - Ram Haveria Jr. (Independent)
  - Jimsen Jison (Independent), television personality
  - Beny Madrigal (Independent)
  - Marvie Madrigal (Independent)
  - Rene Mira (Makabayan)
  - Jep Ordoñez (Independent)
  - Jenilyn Retes (Independent)
  - Susan Romero (Independent)
  - Dindo Rosales (Independent)
  - Josephine Sandiego (Independent)
  - Patricia Senerata (Independent)
  - Nico Shahin Moghaddam (Independent)
  - Greg Teves (Independent)
  - George Villanueva (Independent)
  - Cris Vitangcol (Independent)

==== Results ====
Team Marikina City won five of the eight seats whereas Team Bagong Marikina won three. All re-electionist councilors defended their seats.

2025 Marikina City Council election in the 2nd district
Candidate	Party or alliance		Votes	%
Jaren Feliciano	Marikina City	National Unity Party	83,382	58.42
Angel Nuñez (incumbent)	Marikina City	National Unity Party	74,334	52.08
Ziffred Ancheta	Bagong Marikina	Lakas–CMD	67,753	47.47
Ronnie Acuña	Bagong Marikina	Lakas–CMD	64,328	45.07
Marife Dayao (incumbent)	Marikina City	National Unity Party	64,101	44.91
Elvis Tolentino (incumbent)	Marikina City	National Unity Party	63,440	44.45
Bong Magtubo (incumbent)	Bagong Marikina	Lakas–CMD	59,854	41.94
Larry Punzalan (incumbent)	Marikina City	National Unity Party	59,768	41.88
Miguel De Guzman	Bagong Marikina	Lakas–CMD	58,975	41.32
Michael Mojica	Marikina City	National Unity Party	54,463	38.16
Rizza Teope	Bagong Marikina	Lakas–CMD	54,157	37.95
Ruben Reyes	Marikina City	National Unity Party	48,582	34.04
Indigo Valentin	Bagong Marikina	Lakas–CMD	47,393	33.21
Estelita Makiramdam	Marikina City	National Unity Party	45,271	31.72
Vincent Calanoga	Bagong Marikina	Lakas–CMD	42,775	29.97
Yuri Edullan	Bagong Marikina	Lakas–CMD	36,613	25.65
Susan Romero	Independent		7,587	5.32
Jimsen Jison	Independent		7,345	5.15
Rene Mira	Makabayan		6,729	4.71
Jep Ordoñez	Independent		5,470	3.83
Greg Teves	Independent		5,201	3.64
Cris Vitangcol	Independent		5,043	3.53
Ram Haveria Jr.	Independent		4,120	2.89
Ed Gillera	Independent		4,026	2.82
Nico Shahin Moghaddam	Independent		3,927	2.75
Marvis Madrigal	Independent		3,829	2.68
Beny Madrigal	Independent		3,825	2.68
Patricia Senerata	Independent		3,698	2.59
George Villanueva	Independent		3,682	2.58
Josephine Sandiego	Independent		3,313	2.32
Dindo Rosales	Independent		3,284	2.30
Jenilyn Retes	Independent		3,252	2.28
Total			999,520	100.00

===== Per coalition =====
2025 Marikina City Council election in the 2nd district
Party	Votes	%	Seats
National Unity Party	493,341	49.36	5
Lakas–CMD	431,848	43.21	3
Makabayan	6,729	0.67	0
Independent	67,604	6.76	0
Total	999,522	100.00	8

Vote share
Marikina City	49.36%
Bagong Marikina	43.21%
Makabayan	0.67%
Independent	6.76%

Seat share
Marikina City	62.50%
Bagong Marikina	37.50%

== House of Representatives elections ==
Coinciding with the local elections, two representatives from the city's two congressional districts were elected to represent their respective districts in the House of Representatives in the 20th Congress. In the 2022 elections, Maan Teodoro and Stella Quimbo were elected to represent the first and second districts respectively. Both representatives are in the majority bloc in the 19th Congress.

Summary of the 2025 Philippine House of Representatives elections in Marikina
Party	Coalitions		Candidates	Seats Before	Seats Won	Seat Change	Votes	Percentage
Party	National	Local	Candidates	Seats Before	Seats Won	Seat Change	Votes	Percentage
National Unity Party	ABP	Marikina City	2	1	1	Steady	128,518	52.06%
Lakas–CMD	ABP	Bagong Marikina	1	1	1	Steady	86,984	35.23%
Nacionalista Party	ABP	Bagong Marikina	1		0	Steady	29,091	11.78%
Independent	—N/a		2	0	0	Steady	2,282	0.92%
Total							246,875	100.00%

=== First district ===
2025 Marikina's 1st congressional district election
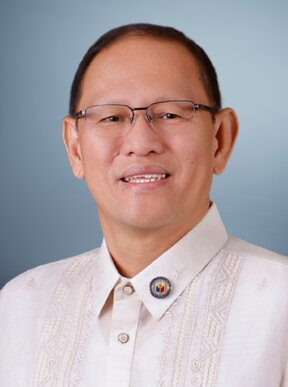

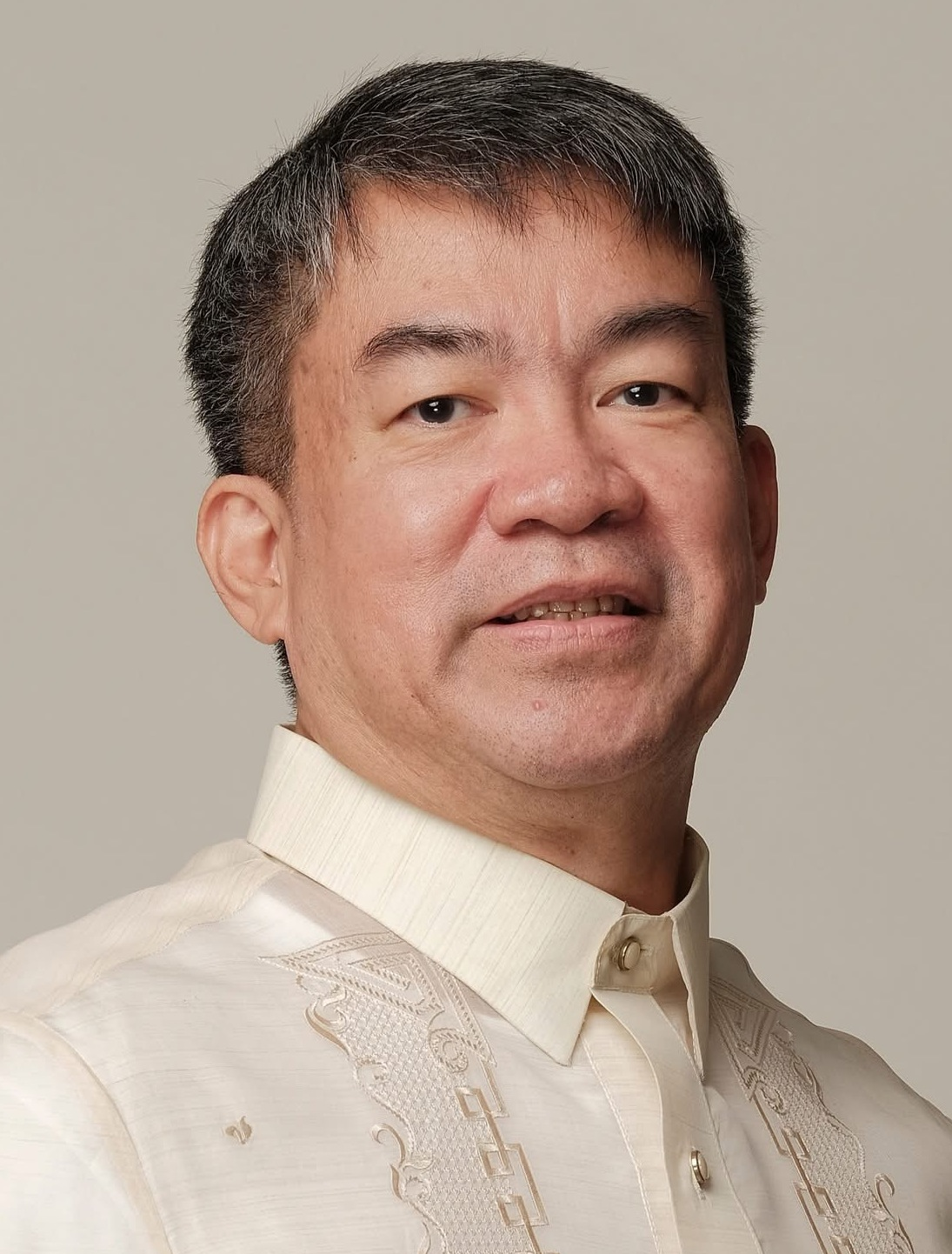
Candidate	Marcelino Teodoro	Koko Pimentel
Party	NUP	Nacionalista
Alliance	Alliances: Bagong Pilipinas (national); Marikina City (local)	Alliances: Bagong Pilipinas (national); Kilos Pagbabago (local); Bagong Marikina (local; guest)
Popular vote	75,062	29,091
Percentage	72.07%	27.93%
- Results per barangay Teodoro: 30–40% >40%
Philippine Representative before election
Maan Teodoro
NUP
Elected Philippine Representative
Marcelino Teodoro
NUP

The first district covers the barangays of Barangka, Calumpang, Industrial Valley Complex, Jesus de la Peña, Malanday, San Roque, Santa Elena, Santo Niño, and Tañong. The incumbent representative was Maan Teodoro, who had served since 2022 and was elected that year with 73.61% of the vote. Teodoro was eligible for re-election to a second term but did not re-election to run for mayor. Marcelino Teodoro, the outgoing mayor and husband of the incumbent representative, was slated to run for the seat under the National Unity Party, an affiliate of the national Alyansa para sa Bagong Pilipinas.

Senator Koko Pimentel, whom briefly entered in an alliance with the local administration, challenged Teodoro for the seat. Pimentel filed his certificate of candidacy for representative on October 6, 2024. He has panned Teodoro for having "no word of honor" and attributed the city's per capita debt to his administration. Pimentel has made the revitalization of the local shoe industry and solving the city's flood issues as core messages of his campaign.

Pimentel and three of his aides filed a petition before the first division of the Commission on Elections (COMELEC) to disqualify Teodoro from the contest, citing Section 78 of the Omnibus Election Code, which establishes material misrepresentation as a ground for disqualification. On December 11, 2024, the COMELEC granted the petition, thereby cancelling Teodoro's candidacy. Teodoro's camp criticized the ruling as an act of "political maneuvering" and filed a motion of reconsideration. Teodoro's name remained on the ballot as the COMELEC en banc failed to rule on the case before the election. Following Teodoro's suspension as mayor along with his allies, Pimentel urged the COMELEC to expedite the processing of his case.

==== Candidates ====
===== Declared =====
- Koko Pimentel (Nacionalista), incumbent senator of the Philippines
- Marcelino Teodoro (NUP), incumbent mayor

==== Results ====
Teodoro defeated Pimentel in a landslide, winning in all nine barangays within the district.

2025 Philippine House of Representatives election in Marikina's 1st district
Candidate	Party	Votes	%
Marcelino Teodoro	National Unity Party	75,062	72.07
Koko Pimentel	Nacionalista	29,091	27.93
Total		104,153	100.00
Valid votes		104,153	97.29
Invalid/blank votes		2,901	2.71
Total votes		107,054	100.00
Registered voters/turnout		127,290	84.10
NUP hold			

Popular vote percentage
Teodoro	72.29%
Pimentel	27.71%

===== Per barangay =====
Barangay	Pimentel		Teodoro		Total	Ref.
Barangay	Votes	%	Votes	%	Total	Ref.
Barangka	3,009	28.43	7,576	71.57	10,585	
Calumpang	2,811	28.96	6,895	71.04	9,706	
Industrial Valley Complex	2,799	31.60	6,058	68.40	8,857	
Jesus de la Peña	1,669	26.48	4,635	73.52	6,304	
Malanday	7,973	27.00	21,482	73.00	29,455	
San Roque	2,969	25.89	8,497	74.11	11,466	
Santa Elena	1,133	23.29	3,732	76.71	4,865	
Santo Niño	4,348	26.95	11,787	73.05	16,135	
Tañong	2,380	35.10	4,400	64.90	6,780	
Total	29,091	27.93	75,062	72.07	104,153	

=== Second district ===
2025 Marikina's 2nd congressional district election
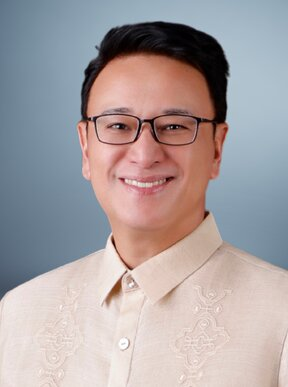

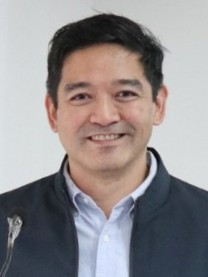
Candidate	Miro Quimbo	Donn Favis
Party	Lakas	NUP
Alliance	Alliances: Bagong Pilipinas (national); Bagong Marikina (local)	Alliances: Bagong Pilipinas (national); Marikina City (local)
Popular vote	86,984	53,456
Percentage	60.95%	37.45%
- Results per barangay Quimbo: 10–20% 20–30% 30–40%
Philippine Representative before election
Stella Quimbo
Lakas
Elected Philippine Representative
Miro Quimbo
Lakas

The second district covers the barangays of Concepcion Uno, Concepcion Dos, Fortune, Marikina Heights, Parang, Nangka, and Tumana. The incumbent representative was Stella Quimbo, who had served since 2019 and was reelected in 2022 with 82.70% of the vote. Quimbo was eligible for a third term but did not seek re-election to run for mayor.

Miro Quimbo, the husband of the incumbent and a former representative who held the seat from 2010 to 2019, ran for the seat under Lakas–CMD, being affiliated with the wider Alyansa para sa Bagong Pilipinas. Councilor Donn Favis, who previously ran for the seat in 2010, contested the seat as a member of the National Unity Party. Perennial candidate Mauro Arce, who ran in 2019 and 2022, and Jose Jaime Enage, the chairman of advocate group Baybayin Buhayin, also sought the seat.

==== Candidates ====
===== Declared =====
- Mauro Arce (Independent), candidate for representative in 2019 and 2022
- Jose Jaime Enage (Independent), chairman of Baybayin Buhayin
- Donn Favis (NUP), incumbent councilor
- Miro Quimbo (Lakas), former representative for the second district

==== Results ====
Quimbo defeated Favis in a landslide, winning in all seven barangays within the district.

2025 Philippine House of Representatives election in Marikina's 2nd district
Candidate	Party	Votes	%
Miro Quimbo	Lakas–CMD	86,984	60.95
Donn Favis	National Unity Party	53,456	37.45
Mauro Arce	Independent	1,375	0.96
Jose Jaime Enage	Independent	907	0.64
Total		142,722	100.00
Valid votes		142,722	94.26
Invalid/blank votes		8,690	5.74
Total votes		151,412	100.00
Registered voters/turnout		175,747	86.15
Lakas–CMD hold			

Popular vote percentage
Quimbo	60.95%
Favis	37.45%
Arce	0.96%
Enage	0.64%

===== Per barangay =====
Barangay	Arce		Enage		Favis		Quimbo		Total	Ref.
Barangay	Votes	%	Votes	%	Votes	%	Votes	%	Total	Ref.
Concepcion Uno	236	1.06	189	0.85	9,008	40.41	12,860	57.69	22,293	
Concepcion Dos	181	1.30	127	0.92	5,242	37.77	8,328	60.01	13,878	
Fortune	147	0.69	100	0.47	7,791	36.58	13,261	62.26	21,299	
Marikina Heights	201	1.13	138	0.78	7,018	39.58	10,372	58.50	17,729	
Nangka	205	0.87	114	0.48	8,345	35.25	15,013	63.41	23,677	
Parang	168	0.88	109	0.57	8,302	43.33	10,580	55.22	19,159	
Tumana	237	0.96	130	0.53	7,750	31.39	16,570	67.12	24,687	
Total	1,375	0.96	907	0.64	53,456	37.45	86,984	60.95	142,722	

== Aftermath ==
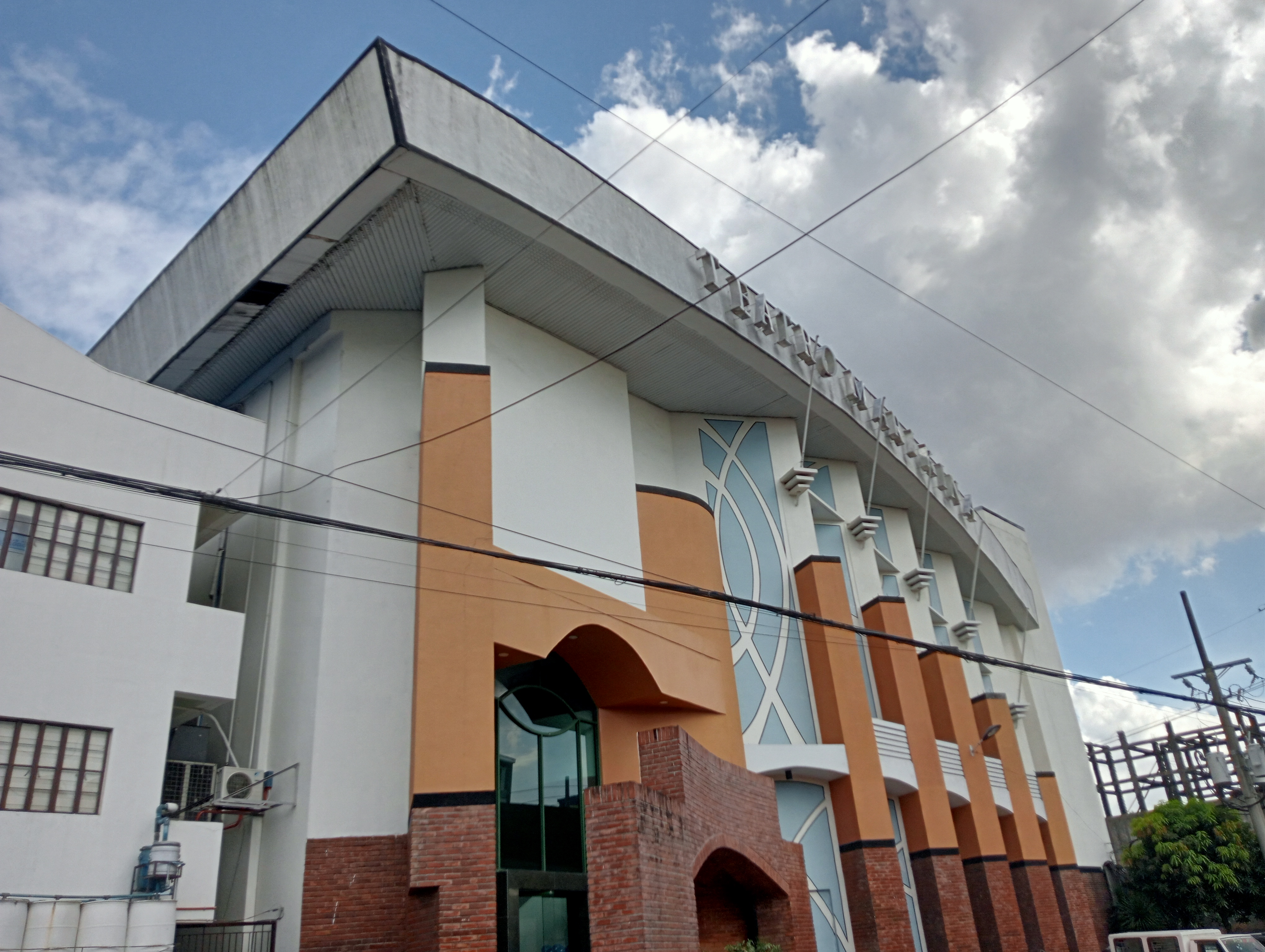
The Teatro Marikina, (pictured in 2023) where the winners were proclaimed by the City Board of Canvassers.

A total of 258,446 voters participated in the election, marking a voter turnout of 81.80%. The City Board of Canvassers proclaimed the winners of the election on May 13 at the Teatro Marikina.

=== Reactions ===
Upon being formally proclaimed mayor-elect, Maan Teodoro called for unity among her constituents and declared the "continuous growth of Marikina" as the priority of her incoming administration. Iya Gozum of Rappler described her victory as a continuation of the outgoing Teodoro administration.

Stella Quimbo conceded to Teodoro on May 13 and expressed her acceptance of the result.

=== Media analysis ===
The results were among the closest in Metro Manila. Dominique Nicole Flores of The Philippine Star contrasted the local vote margins with the lopsided victories elsewhere in the region. Media outlets attributed the results to Quimbo's alleged involvement in the suspension of the administration, which led to a collapse in support from her traditional electoral strongholds of Parang, Fortune, and Marikina Heights. Reports of vote buying were also instrumental in the result, which was accompanied by a widespread phenomenon where voters receive "ayuda" (lit. 'financial assistance') from one candidate and subsequently vote for their opponent.

=== Legal action ===
On May 12, 2025, the COMELEC suspended Representative-elect Marcelino Teodoro's proclamation as the winner of the congressional race in the first district, owing to his pending disqualification case. The poll body's decision on the case will determine whether or not Teodoro will be seated as a member of the 20th Congress on June 30, 2025.

Upon the suspension of his opponent's proclamation, Koko Pimentel urged the COMELEC to further expedite Teodoro's case, deeming his successful congressional run as being "constitutionally defective" and asserting that election results do not override constitutional requirements.

The COMELEC en banc reversed the first division's decision on June 25 and lifted the suspension order on Teodoro, deeming the petitioners' evidence insufficient in proving material misrepresentation.
