= Rommel Acuña =

Filipino politician (born 1973)

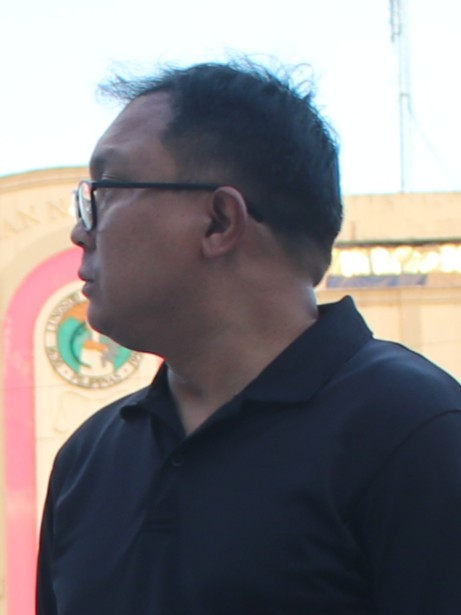
- Acuña in 2025

Mayor of Marikina
- Acting; March 26, 2025 – June 30, 2025
- Vice Mayor: Marion Andres; Ronnie Acuña (acting)
- Preceded by: Marcelino Teodoro
- Succeeded by: Maan Teodoro

Member of the Marikina City Council from the 1st district
- In office June 30, 2019 – March 26, 2025

Member of the Tañong Barangay Council
- In office November 30, 2013 – June 30, 2019

Personal details
- Born: March 7, 1973 (age 53) Quezon City, Philippines
- Party: Lakas (2024–present)
- Other political affiliations: UNA (2021–2024); Liberal (2018–2021)
- Spouse: Teresita de Leon
- Relations: Ronnie Acuña (brother)
- Occupation: Businessman; politician

Rommel "Kambal" Santos Acuña (born March 7, 1973) is a Filipino politician who served as the acting mayor of Marikina from March to June 2025, after the Office of the Ombudsman suspended Marcelino Teodoro from office. Acuña previously served as a member of the Marikina City Council from 2019 to 2025, as well as a member of the Tañong Barangay Council from 2013 to 2019.

During his tenure in the city council, he identified as an ally of Mayor Teodoro. However, leading up to and during his interim mayoralty, he began strengthening his ties to Representative Stella Quimbo and ran in the 2025 Marikina City Council election under her slate. He was defeated, placing twelfth.

== Life and career ==
Acuña was born on March 7, 1973, in Quezon City. He entered politics in 2013, when he was elected as a barangay councilor in Tañong. He was later reelected in 2018, taking his oath in June before Representative Miro Quimbo.

== Marikina City Council (2019–2025) ==
=== Elections ===
Acuña ran for councilor of Marikina's first district as "Kambal Acuña" (lit. 'twin Acuña') in 2019 under the Liberal Party, intending to switch with his twin brother Ronnie Acuña, who at that point had served three terms as Liberal councilor in the district. Rommel won a seat in the city council after placing fifth in the election.

During his 2022 reelection campaign, Acuña was included in the slate of Mayor Marcelino Teodoro, with him actively participating in house-to-house campaigns alongside the latter. He also warned the public about the spread of fake news during the campaign period. Acuña was reelected as councilor under the United Nationalist Alliance (UNA).

Acuña sought reelection to the council in 2025, running under the slate of Representative Stella Quimbo. He was defeated, placing 12th out of 21 candidates.

=== Tenure ===
During a flood response operation in 2024, Acuña highlighted the city's disaster preparedness.

In 2024, Acuña switched his party affiliation to Lakas–CMD and allied himself with Stella Quimbo. The following year, he endorsed the Trabaho Partylist, which ran on a platform supporting labor rights and job opportunities.

== Acting Mayor of Marikina (2025) ==
The Department of Interior and Local Government (DILG) designated Acuña as acting mayor of Marikina on March 26, 2025, a day after Mayor Teodoro's suspension by the Office of the Ombudsman. Simultaneously, his twin brother, Ronnie Acuña, was appointed as acting vice mayor, with both of them sworn into their respective offices before Barangay San Roque chairman Tadeo Amaril in front of city hall.

== Personal life ==
Acuña is married to Teresita de Leon.

== Electoral history ==
Electoral history of Rommel Acuña
Year	Office	Party	Votes received				Result
Year	Office	Party	Total	%	P.	Swing	Result
2019	Councilor (1st district)	Liberal	35,546	44.86%	5th	—N/a	Won
2022	Councilor (1st district)	UNA	55,854	56.15%	4th	▲11.29	Won
2025	Councilor (1st district)	Lakas	35,138	33.74%	12th	▼22.41	Lost

Political offices
Preceded by Marcelino Teodoro	Mayor of Marikina; 2025; Acting	Succeeded by Maan Teodoro
