= Michael M. Coroza =

Filipino writer (born 1969)

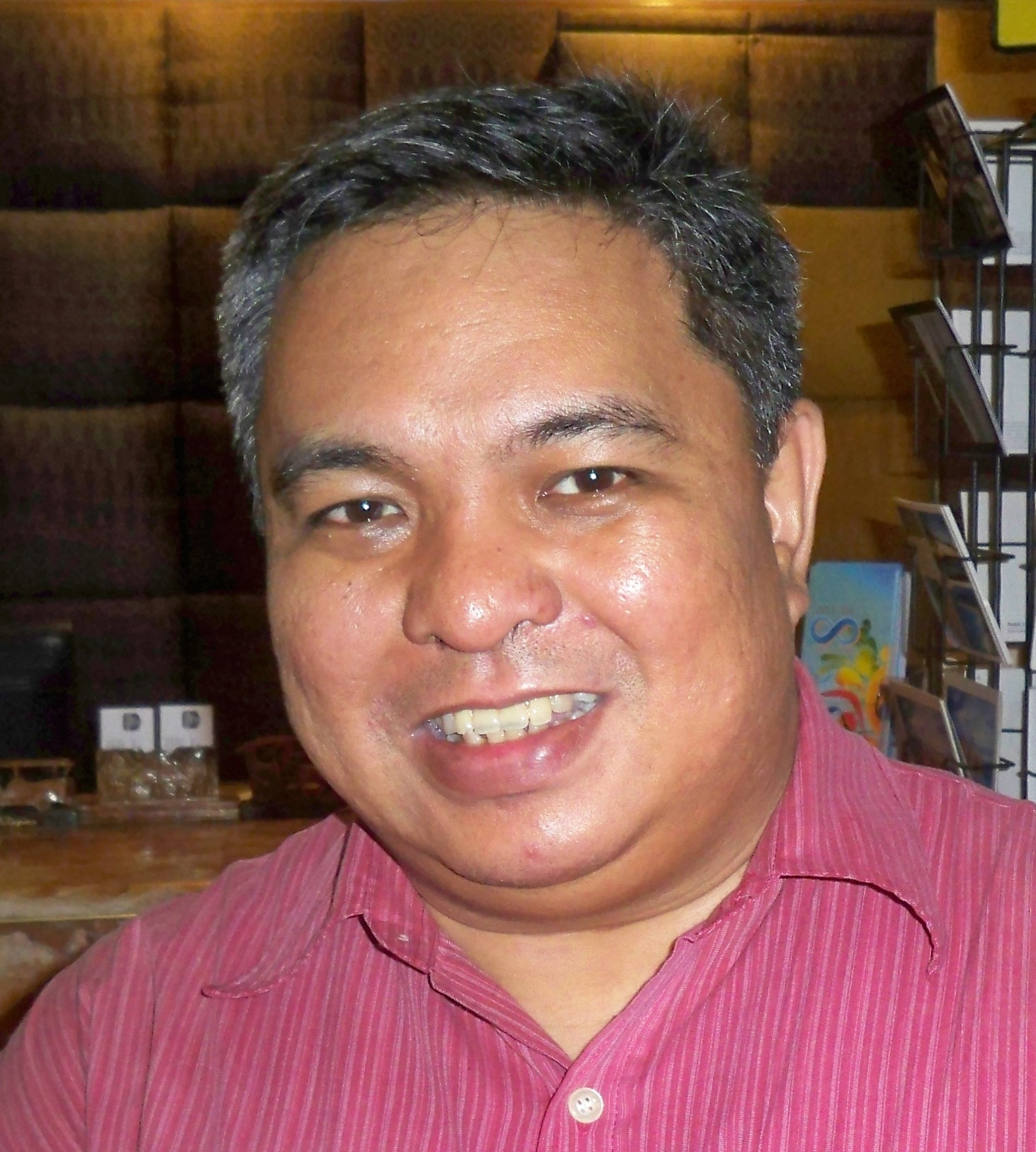
- Born: August 26, 1969 (age 57); Manila
- Occupations: Poet and Professor of Filipino Language and Literature at the Ateneo de Manila University
- Spouse: Jeanette Job Coroza
- Writing career
- Language: Filipino
- Notable works: Dili't Dilim (1997); Mga Lagot Na Liwanag (2002); May Di-mawaglit Na Awit (2021); Imbisibol Man ang Tatay (2009); Ang Mga Kahon ni Kalon (2010); Mga Lambing ni Lolo Ding (2012); Nawawala si Muningning (2015)
- Notable awards: S.E.A. Write Award; Palanca Awards

Michael M. Coroza (born August 26, 1969) is a Filipino poet, educator, and S.E.A. Write Award laureate.

== Education ==
He obtained his Bachelor of Arts degree in philosophy from the University of Santo Tomas in 1990. He later obtained a Master of Arts in literature (Filipino) from the Ateneo de Manila University in 2001, and his Doctor of Philosophy in Filipino (Language and Translation) from the University of the Philippines Diliman in 2010.

== Career ==
Michael M. Coroza is a full professor and former chair (2020 - 2023) of the Department of Filipino, School of Humanities, Ateneo de Manila University. He teaches Filipino literature, creative writing (poetry), and literary translation at the graduate and undergraduate levels. For his work as a poet, essayist, literary translator, and editor, he received the S.E.A. Write Award (Southeast Asian Writers Award) from the Royalty of Thailand in 2007 and the Ani ng Dangal (Harvest of Honor) Award from the National Commission for Culture and the Arts (NCCA) of the Republic of the Philippines in 2009. He has won eight major awards for his poems, essays, and stories for children in the Don Carlos Palanca Awards for Literature. In two successive years, 2015 and 2016, he received the National Book Award for Best Book in Language Studies from the Manila Critics Circle (MCC) and the National Book Development Board (NBDB). In 2019, the Komisyon sa Wikang Filipino (Commission on the Filipino Language) distinguished him as Kampeon ng Wika (Language Champion) in Literature and Translation. He received in 2016 the Rev. Fr. Henry Lee Irwin, SJ, Memorial Teacher Award for the Humanities from the Ateneo de Manila University. Since 2012, he has held at the same university the Rev. Fr. Horacio de la Costa, SJ, Endowed Professorial Chair in History and Humanities. For two terms, 2017 - 2019 and 2020 - 2022, he served as head of the National Committee on Language and Translation (NCLT) of the Sub-commission on Cultural Dissemination of the NCCA. He is now on his third term as chair of the Unyon ng mga Manunulat sa Pilipinas (UMPIL, or Writers' Union of the Philippines).

In 2000, Coroza and Marikina councilor Marcelino Teodoro established the short-lived publishing company Talingdao Publishing House.

== Creative works ==
He writes poetry and short stories for children and is engaged in literary translation. His critical essays on language and literature have been published in national and international journals such as Kritika Kultura, Philippine Studies, Unitas, Tomas Literary Journal, Bulawan Journal of Arts and Culture, Daluyan, Loyola Schools Review, Katipunan Journal, Hasaan, and the Malay Indonesian Studies. Together with premier poets Teo T. Antonio and Victor Emmanuel D. Nadera Jr., he has performed the Balagtasan, traditional poetic joust, in significant cultural events in the Philippines and in cities abroad like Singapore, Honolulu, Hawaii, San Francisco, California, and New York City. From 2009 to 2020, he wrote a weekly column on language and literature called Haraya (Imagination) for the Liwayway (Dawn) Magazine, the Philippines’ longest-running popular literary magazine in the National Language since 1922. He has represented the Philippines in international literary events such as the 10th Kuala Lumpur World Poetry Reading (Malaysia, 2004), the 2nd Korea-ASEAN Poets Literature Festival (Pekanbaru, Indonesia, 2011), Sharjah Children's Reading Festival (United Arab Emirates, 2018), Neilson Hays Bangkok Literature Festival (Thailand, 2019), and Payakumbuh Poetry Festival (Indonesia, 2022).

He staunchly advocates the preservation of the kundiman and other traditional and classic Philippine song forms such as the balitaw and dansa. He has produced and hosted "Harana ng Puso with the Mabuhay Singers," which aired over DWBR 104.3 FM from 2006 to 2017, Radyo Pilipinas Dos kHz from 2017 to 2020, and now on YouTube since 2021. He has also produced and hosted PLAKA (Pamana ng Lahi, Arte, Kultura, Atbp), featuring vintage Filipino songs from the 1940s to the 1960s on 78 rpm and vinyl records on Radyo Pilipinas Dos 918 kHz from 2016 to 2020. It has been on YouTube since August 2020, and Prof. Felipe M. de Leon Jr., Sonia Roco, and Jeanette Job Coroza have joined him as the show's co-hosts.

In 2024, he collaborated with ballet masters and choreographers Gerardo Francisco and Martin Samuel Lawrance to create the libretto for Ballet Manila's Florante at Laura. With world-renowned Lisa Macuja Elizalde as artistic director, the much-acclaimed production premiered at the Aliw Theater in Pasay City in October 2024.

== Major works ==
- Dili't Dilim (Thought and Darkness). Manila: University of Santo Tomas Publishing House, 1997. (Book of Poems)
- Mga Lagot na Liwanag (Severed Lights). Manila: University of Santo Tomas Publishing House, 2002. (Book of Poems)
- Imbisibol Man ang Tatay (My Father is an Invisible Man). Quezon City: Lampara Books, 2009. (Story Book for Children)
- Ang mga Kahon ni Kalon (Kalon's Boxes). Quezon City: Lampara Books, 2010. (Story Book for Children)
- Ang mga Lambing ni Lolo Ding (Grandfather Ding's Tender Wishes). Quezon City: Adarna House, Inc., 2012. (Story Book for Children)
- Napapanahong Panlipunang Pilosopiya. Manila: Aklat ng Bayan ng Komisyon sa Wikang Filipino, 2014. (Translation in Filipino of Manuel B. Dy Jr.'s Contemporary Social Philosophy)
- Nawawala si Muningning (Muningning is Missing). Quezon City: Adarna House, Inc., 2015. (Story Book for Children)
- Ambagan 2013: Mga Salita Mula sa Iba't Ibang Wika ng Filipinas. Quezon City: University of the Philippines Press and Filipinas Institute of Translation, 2015. (Language Studies Book)
- Ang Rebolusyong Filipino. Manila: Aklat ng Bayan ng Komisyon sa Wikang Filipino, 2015. (Translation in Filipino of Apolinario Mabini's original work in Spanish, La Revolucion Filipina)
- Pampanitikang Gawain ang Pagsasalin (Translation is a Literary Act). Manila: Aklat ng Bayan ng Komisyon sa Wikang Filipino, 2018. (Monograph)
- Sa Ibang Salita: Mga Piling Panayam sa Salinan Pandaigdigang Kumperensiya 2017. Manila: Aklat ng Bayan ng Komisyon sa Wikang Filipino, 2018. (Edited collection of selected papers read by invited speakers at the Salinan International Translation Conference 2017)
- Dionisio San Agustin: Ilang Sulyap sa Daigdig, Mga Tala at Aral sa Pagbisita sa America. Manila: University of Santo Tomas Publishing House, 2018. (Edited travelogue essays by Dionisio San Agustin, editor-in-chief of Bagong Buhay, popular Tagalog broadsheet in the 50's)
- May Di-Mawaglit Na Awit (There's a Song that Can't be Forgotten). Naga City: Ateneo de Naga University Press, 2021. (Book of Poems)
- Dili't Dilim & Mga Lagot Na Liwanag (Thought and Darkness & Severed Lights). Manila: University of Santo Tomas Publishing House, 2023.

== Awards ==
- S.E.A. Write Award (2007)
- Don Carlos Palanca Memorial Awards for Literature: Honorable Mention, Filipino Poetry (1991); Second Prize, Filipino Poetry (1998); First Prize, Filipino Poetry (2001); Third Prize, Essay in Filipino (2002); Third Prize, Short Story for Children in Filipino (2007); Second Prize, Essay in Filipino (2008); Second Prize, Short Story for Children in Filipino (2009); Third Prize, Poems written for Children in Filipino (2009).
- Ani ng Dangal (Harvest of Honor) Award from the National Commission for Culture and Arts (2009)
- National Book Award for Best Book in Language Studies from the National Book Development Board (NBDB) and the Manila Critics Circle (MCC) (2015 and 2016)
- Rev. Fr. Henry Lee Irwin Memorial Teacher Award for the Humanities from the Ateneo de Manila University (2016)
- TOTAL (The Outstanding Thomasian Alumni) Award for the Humanities from the University of Santo Tomas (2016)
- Kampeon ng Wika sa Panitikan at Salin (Language Champion in Literature and Translation) from the Komisyon sa Wikang Filipino (Commission on the Filipino Language) (2019)
- Espesyal na Gawad Jacinto (Special Jacinto Award) from the Linangan sa Imahen, Retorika at Anyo (LIRA) (2023)
- Parangal Hagbong 2025 from The Varsitarian of the University of Santo Tomas

== Personal life ==
He has been married since 1994 to Jeanette Job Coroza, a public schools district supervisor at the Department of Education Division of Marikina City, with whom he has three children.
