= Alma Fernandez-Mallonga =

Filipino lawyer

- Born: Alma Dumlao Fernandez; September 30, 1960 (age 66); Quezon City, Philippines
- Education: University of the Philippines Diliman (BS; LLB)
- Occupation: Lawyer
- Spouse: Eric Mallonga
- Children: 3

Alma Dumlao Fernandez-Mallonga (born September 30, 1960) is a Filipino lawyer who is a senior partner at the Siguion Reyna, Montecillo & Ongsiako Law Office. She has served as legal counsel for various corporations, families, and rape victims, and has been an advocate for women and children's rights.

== Early life and education ==
Alma Fernandez was born on September 30, 1960 to Alejandro Fernandez and Feliza Dumlao Fernandez.

Fernandez-Mallonga graduated summa cum laude at the University of the Philippines Diliman in 1981, receiving a bachelor's degree in sociology. She later attended the UP Law School, where she graduated cum laude as valedictorian. By 1986, she passed the Philippine Bar Examination.

== Career ==
Fernandez-Mallonga began her legal career at the Castillo Law Office, where she was a member from 1986 to 1987. From 1987 to 1991, Fernandez-Mallonga served as the chief technical assistant of Senator Santanina Rasul. Since 1991, she has served as a lawyer at the Siguion Reyna, Montecillo & Ongsiako Law Office, the oldest active law firm in the Philippines; she is now a senior partner at the firm. She is also a founding member of the Women's Legal Bureau, Inc., a non-governmental organization established in February 1991.

Mallonga's legal expertise is in criminal, civil and corporate litigation. Her clients have included corporations such as San Miguel, Philippine Airlines, Nestlé Philippines, and Dole Philippines, while her pro bono work has involved clients who were minors in rape cases and families with marital issues. In 2006, she served as the legal counsel of businessman Tonyboy Cojuangco of PLDT, who was then accused by Roy Señeres of participating in an alleged coup attempt in February 2006 that had resulted in a standoff at Fort Bonifacio.

In 2007, Fernandez-Mallonga was noted to be a co-owner of the Tropezz Bar and Restaurant alongside Jiji Fernandez and two others at Greenbelt 3 in Makati.

In 2008, she and her husband Eric established the Meritxell Children's World in Barangay Concepcion Dos, Marikina, which operates both an orphanage for babies and for girls. In the early 2010s, the two served as radio hosts for the program Magkabiyak sa Batas (transl. Spouses in law) at Radio Veritas.

In recent years, Fernandez-Mallonga has served as the legal counsel of actor Vhong Navarro, actress Gretchen Barretto, and Marikina congressman Marcelino Teodoro.

== Personal life ==
Fernandez and Eric Mallonga met each other as students at the UP Law School, with the two becoming married by 1986. They have three children: Marky, Erica and Alexis. Eric Mallonga served as senior state prosecutor at the Department of Justice in the 1996 rape case against television producer Romeo Jalosjos Sr. involving a minor, and later became a member of the Movie and Television Review and Classification Board in the 2000s, leading the review group that revised the X-rating given to the 2007 short anthology film Rights to a lower R-13 rating.
