= Stella Quimbo =

Filipino economist, academic, and politician (born 1969)

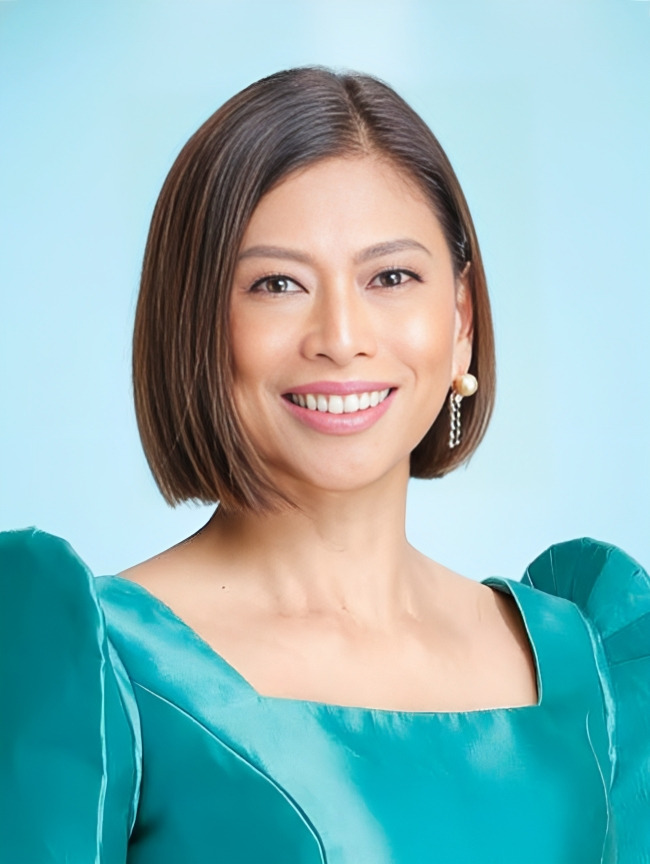
- Official portrait, 2023

Member of the Philippine House of Representatives from Marikina's 2nd congressional district
- In office June 30, 2019 – June 30, 2025
- Preceded by: Miro Quimbo
- Succeeded by: Miro Quimbo
Committee positions
Chairperson of the Philippine House Committee on Appropriations
Officer in Charge; June 15, 2025 – June 30, 2025
Preceded by	Zaldy Co
Succeeded by	Mika Suansing

Commissioner of the Philippine Competition Commission
- In office 2016–2019
- Appointed by: Benigno Aquino III

Personal details
- Born: Stella Luz Fagela Alabastro; November 23, 1969 (age 56) Ermita, Manila, Philippines
- Party: Lakas (2024–present)
- Other political affiliations: Liberal (2018–2024)
- Spouse: Miro Quimbo (m. 1998)
- Children: 4
- Education: University of the Philippines (BS, MA, PhD); King's College London (MA)
- Occupation: Politician; economist; professor

Stella Luz Alabastro Quimbo (born Stella Luz Fagela Alabastro; November 23, 1969) is a Filipino politician and academic who served as the representative for Marikina's second district from 2019 to 2025. She was a mayoral candidate in the 2025 Marikina local elections.

Quimbo studied economics at the University of the Philippines Diliman and began her academic career as a professor at her alma mater, building a research portfolio focused on health economics. She later earned her master's degree and doctorate in economics at the same institution. In 2016, she entered government after President Benigno Aquino III appointed her to serve as a commissioner of the Philippine Competition Commission.

Quimbo was elected to Congress in the 2019 elections as a member of the Liberal Party, succeeding her husband Miro. During her first term, she aligned with the House minority, opposing the policies of President Rodrigo Duterte and supporting the presidential campaign of Vice President Leni Robredo in the 2022 elections. She would be repudiated by her allies in the following term after expressing her support for the Maharlika Wealth Fund and defending the confidential funds of Vice President Sara Duterte.

Quimbo ran for mayor in 2025 as a member of Lakas–CMD, with former mayor Del de Guzman as her running mate. She positioned her local coalition as the opposition to the incumbent Mayor Marcelino Teodoro. During the campaign, her camp was accused of vote buying and abuse of state resources. She was ultimately defeated by Maan Teodoro after a contentious campaign.

== Early life and education ==
Quimbo was born on November 23, 1969, to food scientist Estrella Alabastro, who would serve as dean of the College of Home Economics at the University of the Philippines Diliman and as a secretary of science and technology under the Arroyo administration. She studied at the UP Diliman and obtained her Bachelor of Science in Business Economics summa cum laude and University Valedictorian in 1991, Master of Arts in economics in 1993, and Doctor of Philosophy in Economics in 2000. The following year, she would do her postdoctoral work at Brown University. In 2018, she obtained a master's degree in Competition Law from the King's College London.

== Academic career ==
Quimbo worked as a professor and a department chairperson at the University of the Philippines School of Economics. From 2011 to 2013, Quimbo served as the Prince Clause Professorial Chair, an untenured visiting professorship position at the Erasmus University Rotterdam in the Netherlands. She was the first Southeast Asian to hold the position. Quimbo's research portfolio focuses on the field of health economics, industrial organization, microeconomics, education, poverty, and public policy. For her research studies into health economics, a then-new field of research in the country, the National Academy of Science and Technology awarded her the Outstanding Young Scientist award in 2009.

== Philippine Competition Commission (2016–2019) ==
In 2016, President Benigno Aquino III appointed Quimbo as a commissioner of the Philippine Competition Commission (PCC). She would serve in that role from 2016 until her resignation in 2019 to run for a seat in the House of Representatives.

== House of Representatives (2019–2025) ==
=== Elections ===
On November 30, 2018, Quimbo filed to run for representative in Marikina's second district under the Liberal Party to succeed her husband, Miro Quimbo, who had held the seat since 2010. In the May 9, 2019, election, Quimbo easily won the seat, defeating former representative Eugene de Vera and independent Mauro Arce.

Following the election, de Vera contested Quimbo's eligibility for the position in a quo warranto petition before the House of Representatives Electoral Tribunal, citing the Philippine Competition Act, which prohibited former commissioners of the PCC to run for public office during their tenure and the two-year period following the end of their tenure. Beng Sardillo, Quimbo's legal counsel, derided the petition as self-serving and erroneous.

In 2022, Quimbo was reelected to a second term, defeating her closest opponent, former mayor Del de Guzman.

=== Tenure ===
As a representative, Quimbo was described as having a strict mentality and a volatile office environment. In the 18th Congress, Quimbo was a member of a technical working group tasked to study the franchise renewal of ABS-CBN, the largest broadcaster in the Philippines. She was the lone dissenter against the decision of two other members, representatives Pablo John Garcia and Xavier Jesus Romuald, to disapprove the application of ABS-CBN for another franchise. In the 19th Congress, Quimbo served as a vice chairperson of the House Committee on Appropriations.

In September 2023, Quimbo's support of the Maharlika Wealth Fund and defense of Vice President Sara Duterte's use of confidential and intelligence funds for her office and the Department of Education resulted in calls to sanction Quimbo as a member of the Liberal Party. In response, party president Edcel Lagman confirmed that Quimbo will not receive sanctions for her positions, emphasizing the party's tradition of recognizing the "freedom of expression and dissent" of its members.

In August 2024, Quimbo was embroiled in a dispute with Duterte over the passage of funds for the Office of the Vice President. The same month, Quimbo left the Liberal Party and took oath as a member of Lakas–CMD. In October 2024, Quimbo and Representative Nica Co jointly filed an ethics complaint against Representative Wilbert T. Lee, anchored on alleged threats and acts of aggression during the 2025 budget hearing with the House Committee on Ethics and Privileges. Following the resignation of Duterte as secretary of education, Quimbo was considered as a possible successor.

Following the ouster of Zaldy Co as chair of the House Committee on Appropriations in January 2025, Quimbo assumed the role as an officer in charge in her capacity as the committee's senior vice chairperson. On February 6, Quimbo signed the impeachment complaint against Vice President Sara Duterte.

== 2025 Marikina mayoral campaign ==
=== Background ===
Shortly before the 2024 State of the Nation Address on July 22, 2024, Miro confirmed that Quimbo will run for mayor of Marikina in the 2025 local elections and thus will not seek another term as representative. She filed her candidacy for mayor in October 2022, with Del de Guzman as her vice mayoral running mate. Her camp contested the election as Team Bagong Marikina (lit. 'Team New Marikina'; also stylized as Team Bagong Marik1na) and positioned themselves as the opposition to the incumbent administration led by Mayor Marcelino Teodoro, which she had criticized as being adversarial to her projects and policies as representative.

=== Campaign ===
Quimbo's mayoral platform revolved around managing the city's debt, carrying out their vision of transforming Marikina into a "business-friendly" start-up city, and attending to the needs of the city's health centers. Her campaign emphasized the city's ₱3.6 billion outstanding debt as a key issue and proposed cutting business taxes and securing adequate funding from the national government as a response. She also expressed support for the Wawa Dam project as a means of flood control and attracting businesses and investments into the city.

The Quimbo campaign was characterized by its media appearances in contrast to the Teodoros' preference for alliance-sanctioned events. Her opponents accused her campaign style of being a smear campaign. She criticized the proliferation of disinformation during the campaign, having been the subject of fake graphics that circulated on social media.

During the campaign, she faced criticism for her appearances with luxury goods, which led to allegations of ill-gotten wealth. Her supporters, including Former Governor of the Bangko Sentral ng Pilipinas Felipe Medalla, have deemed the allegations misogynistic and credited Quimbo's wealth to her consulting income from academia.

On April 26, 2025, the Commission on Elections (COMELEC) Kontra Bigay committee issued show-cause orders to Quimbo and her husband, Miro, to explain their conduct over alleged incidents of vote buying and abuse of state resources during their respective campaigns. In response, they released a joint statement denying the claims and ensuring their compliance with the order.

=== Results and aftermath ===
Quimbo went on to be narrowly defeated by fellow representative Maan Teodoro in the race with the closest vote margin since 2016. Despite her loss, de Guzman, her running mate, went on to defeat the incumbent vice mayor Marion Andres, by narrower margin, marking his return to elected office. Quimbo promptly conceded to Teodoro on May 13 and expressed her acceptance of the result. She would reverse later reverse her position months later, filing an electoral protest before the COMELEC, citing alleged irregularities and anomalies in the election's conduct.

== Public profile ==
From the 18th Congress through the 2022 Philippine general election, Quimbo was regarded as a rising star in the House minority, owing to her opposition to the policies of President Rodrigo Duterte and support for the presidential campaign of Vice President Leni Robredo, who ran as the opposition candidate to the Duterte administration, which endorsed eventual President Bongbong Marcos. In the 19th Congress, Quimbo began aligning herself with the Marcos administration upon becoming the senior vice chairperson of the House Committee on Appropriations.

Quimbo identifies herself as an "accidental politician" and has expressed her preference for working in the field of economics rather than politics. In a 2023 interview with Rappler during her tenure as representative, she denied any aspirations for higher office. Quimbo's projects as a representative, including government buildings, covered courts, health centers, fire stations, and vehicles, have been scrutinized by media outlets as an example of epal politics, citing the prominent placements of the letter "Q" and use of the color pink in such projects. She has defended these branding practices, regarding them as a means of holding themselves accountable to their constituents.

== Personal life ==
Quimbo married lawyer and former representative Miro Quimbo in August 1998; they have four children. Since her marriage, Quimbo has resided in Concepcion Dos.

== Electoral history ==
Electoral history of Stella Quimbo
Year	Office	Party	Votes received				Result
Year	Office	Party	Total	%	P.	Swing	Result
2019	Representative (Marikina–2nd)	Liberal	79,598	83.74%	1st	—N/a	Won
2022	Representative (Marikina–2nd)	Liberal	103,108	82.70%	1st	-1.04	Won
2025	Mayor of Marikina	Lakas–CMD	117,795	44.16%	2nd	—N/a	Lost

== Bibliography ==
- Stella Alabastro, Douglas H. Brooks and Myo Thant (1998), "Cambodia, Lao PDR, and Myanmar", in Douglas H. Brooks and Myo Thant (eds.), Social Sector Issues in Transitional Economies of Asia, pp. 367–416, New York: Asian Development Bank, Oxford University Press. (ISBN 0-19-591154-7)

House of Representatives of the Philippines
Preceded by Miro Quimbo	Member of the House of Representatives from Marikina's 2nd district 2019–2025	Succeeded by Miro Quimbo
