= Marcelino Teodoro =

Filipino politician (born 1970)

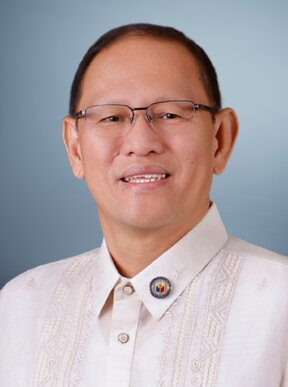
- Official portrait, 2025

Member of the Philippine House of Representatives from Marikina's 1st district
- Incumbent
- Assumed office July 1, 2025
- Preceded by: Maan Teodoro
- In office June 30, 2007 – June 30, 2016
- Preceded by: District created
- Succeeded by: Bayani Fernando

Mayor of Marikina
- In office June 30, 2016 – June 30, 2025 (Note: Suspended from March 25, 2025 to June 30, 2025; Rommel Acuña acted as mayor during suspension)
- Vice Mayor: Jose Fabian Cadiz (2016–2019); Marion Andres (2019–2025)
- Preceded by: Del de Guzman
- Succeeded by: Maan Teodoro

Member of the Marikina City Council Marikina Municipal Council (1992–96)
- In office June 30, 1992 – June 30, 2001

Personal details
- Born: Marcelino Reyes Teodoro; August 2, 1970 (age 56) Marikina, Rizal, Philippines
- Party: NUP (since 2024)
- Other political affiliations: UNA (2021–24); PDP–Laban (2017–21); NPC (2015–17); Liberal (2010–15); Independent (2007–10); Lakas (1992–98)
- Spouse: Maan Ang
- Children: 2
- Education: University of the Philippines Diliman (BA); Ateneo de Manila University (MAT)
- Profession: Politician; publisher

Marcelino "Marcy" Reyes Teodoro (born August 2, 1970) is a Filipino politician who has served as the representative for Marikina's first district since 2025. A member of the National Unity Party, he previously held the seat from 2007 to 2016 and served as the mayor of Marikina from 2016 to 2025.

Educated in philosophy at the University of the Philippines Diliman, Teodoro entered politics in 1992 after being elected to the Marikina Municipal Council (later the Marikina City Council) at the age of 21. In 2000, he established a publishing house with writer Michael M. Coroza. He first became a member of the House of Representatives of the Philippines in 2007 and served until 2016, when he ran for mayor of Marikina and defeated incumbent mayor Del de Guzman. During his mayoralty, he oversaw the local government's response to the COVID-19 pandemic and the aftermath of Typhoon Ulysses, both of which were received favorably in the media.

In March 2025, during his final term, the Office of the Ombudsman suspended Teodoro and members of his administration for six months in response to allegations of misusing PhilHealth funds. Although he later won a decisive victory in that year's congressional election, his proclamation remained suspended until July 1, 2025, when the Commission on Elections reversed a division's earlier decision to cancel his candidacy over a residency dispute.

== Early life and education ==
Teodoro was born on August 2, 1970, in Santa Elena, Marikina, to Amado Teodoro, a government official, and Lydia Reyes, a teacher. Owing to the occupations of his parents, he spent most his childhood with his maternal grandparents. He attended San Roque Elementary School and graduated as valedictorian in 1982. He later completed his secondary education at the Marikina Institute of Science and Technology (now Marikina Science High School) as salutatorian in 1986.

In 1990, Teodoro graduated with a degree in philosophy at the University of the Philippines Diliman (UP). The following semester after his graduation, he decided to delay law school to teach logic and social philosophy at UP Diliman. He pursued a Master of Arts in teaching philosophy at the Ateneo de Manila University, where he completed a certificate course in 1997. In 2000, Teodoro and writer Michael M. Coroza, his UP batchmate, established the short-lived publishing company Talingdao Publishing House.

== Early political career ==
Teodoro was elected as a member of the Marikina Municipal Council in 1992 at the age of 21 as an independent. That year, the Marikina Valley Heritage Foundation awarded Teodoro the "Katibayan ng Tanging Pagkilala" (lit. 'Testimonial of distinguished recognition').

In 1993, Teodoro sought to halt the logging reportedly being done for a realty firm in the mountains of neighboring San Mateo, Rizal, as he expressed fears that it could lead to flash floods in Marikina. In the same year, Teodoro defended Mayor Bayani Fernando from comments made by Representative Romeo Candazo and other opposition councilors alleging that the newly established municipal radio station (DWPM) was operated illegally, arguing that President Fidel V. Ramos had personally approved of its creation.

In 1998, the Roosevelt College System awarded him the "Testimonial of Distinguished Service".

Teodoro was reelected to two more terms as a councilor, with his third term ending in 2001.

With the endorsement of Bayani and Marides Fernando, Teodoro ran for representative in the newly created Marikina's first district in 2007 as an independent; he won the election and served until 2016.

== Marikina mayoral campaigns ==
=== 2016 ===
Being termed out as a representative in 2016, Teodoro filed his candidacy for mayor, challenging incumbent mayor Del de Guzman. He campaigned on a platform that sought to alleviate traffic concerns in the city and reinforce public safety in every barangay. While Teodoro and de Guzman were both protégés and key figures in the administrations of Bayani and Marides Fernando, the couple opted to endorse Teodoro, having described de Guzman as a "non-performer".

During the campaign, the Philippine Daily Inquirer published a video depicting San Roque residents receiving cash from Teodoro's staffers under a cash-for-work program of the Department of Social Welfare and Development (DSWD), which promoted de Guzman to urge the DSWD to investigate the matter. Teodoro deemed the charges "black propaganda", and considered the incident a continuation of DSWD's programs.

=== 2019 ===
In 2019, Teodoro sought reelection unopposed, with Andres as his running mate. His coalition, Team MarCy, went on to win overall control of the local government, with Andres being elected vice mayor and winning ten seats in the City Council.

=== 2022 ===
In 2019, Teodoro sought reelection for a third and final term. He faced Bayani Fernando in the mayoral race, which The Manila Times described as a "bitter rivalry", owing to their former alliance. He went on to defeat Fernando with 82.07% of the vote, with his Team MarCy coalition winning all but two seats in the City Council, leaving Fernando's camp largely out of the local legislature.

== Mayor of Marikina (2016–2025) ==
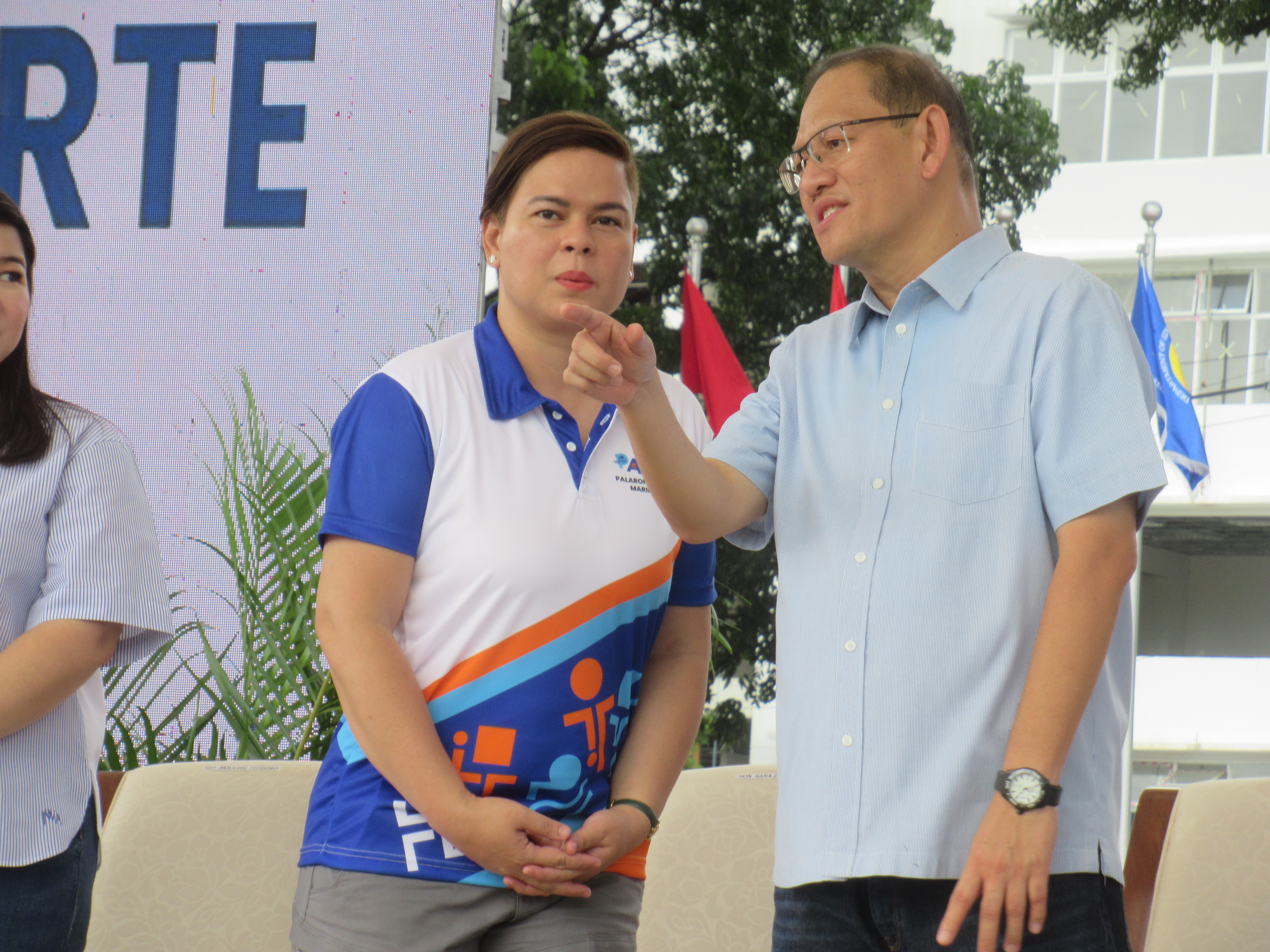
Teodoro with Vice President Sara Duterte at the closing ceremony of the 2023 Palarong Pambansa.

Teodoro was sworn in as mayor on June 30, 2016. Upon taking office, he retained the city hall personnel who worked under de Guzman. While he was elected as a member of the Nationalist People's Coalition, he later joined PDP–Laban in May 2017, migrated to the United Nationalist Alliance in 2022, and then joined the National Unity Party in 2024. In a 2023 interview, he cited education and health as the priorities of his administration.

During his tenure, Teodoro sought to resume the policies and practices instituted by his mentor Bayani Fernando, including the "Munting Basura, Ibulsa Muna" (lit. 'Small trash, pocket it first') initiative and the maintenance of a dedicated streetwalk clearing team. Despite his deference to Fernando's style of governance, he sought to differentiate himself from his mentor by seeking dialogue on his policies before they are implemented.

In 2018, Teodoro spearheaded efforts to make Davao City a sister city of Marikina, achieving the goal in June.

In April 2023, the Department of the Interior and Local Government (DILG) named Marikina as the most improved local government unit, citing compliance with financial transparency and fiscal accountability. In the same year, his administration oversaw the organization of the 2023 Palarong Pambansa, which ended in a drone show erroneously depicting the Philippine flag with its blue and red stripes interchanged, leading to litigation.

=== Relations with the Philippine National Police ===
In April 2019, Oscar Albayalde, chief of the Philippine National Police (PNP), criticized Teodoro for committing "childish acts", citing the alleged withdrawal of local support for the PNP following the promotion of city chief Roger Quesada to the Police Regional Office. Teodoro denied Albayalde's accusations and deemed his comments unfair and possibly detrimental to his government's relations with the PNP. The DILG opened subsequently a probe on the issue on April 25, a move Teodoro welcomed.

=== COVID-19 response ===
In response to the COVID-19 pandemic, Teodoro instructed his government to install misting and decontamination tents across numerous public spaces in the city and provide households with free disinfectant solutions. On March 9, 2020, he postponed the 63rd Palarong Pambansa in compliance with an order from the Department of Education to postpone national and regional events. With the shoe industry largely ceasing operations during the pandemic, Teodoro pushed for the digitalization of business for continuity.

On March 16, Teodoro announced plans to set up a testing center, partnering with Manila Health Tek and the Philippine National Institutes of Health for the effort. For the facility, the city government procured a polymerase chain reaction machine specifically for testing, along with 3,000 test kits worth ₱4 million ($78,824.72). Teodoro's government set up the facility in a vacant building in Concepcion Uno and opened it on April 15, bypassing the approval of the Department of Health (DOH), regarding their mass testing efforts as urgent and expressing their openness to face charges for the move. His government's mass testing initiative was among the first in the country, which Mara Cepeda of Rappler praised as a "common sense" move. In June 2020, The Philippine Star named Teodoro as a top-performing mayor during the pandemic.

On April 6, the Marikina City Health Office launched a telehealth medical consultation program via VSee for residents with concerns related to COVID-19.

=== Typhoon Ulysses ===
In November 2020, Typhoon Ulysses impacted Marikina, causing widespread destruction and casualties. The city was among the hardest hit by the typhoon, with the ongoing COVID-19 pandemic further complicating evacuation and relief efforts. During landfall, the river's water level rose to a peak of 22 meters, which Teodoro noted led to a year and a half's worth of garbage cluttering the city, which subsequently made travel difficult. His government sought assistance from the Philippine Coast Guard, National Disaster Risk Reduction and Management Council, and the Philippine Air Force in their rescue operations and appealed for donations for the ensuing rebuilding efforts.

The city government estimated that the cyclone caused ₱30 billion in damages in the city, including lost economic opportunities and merchandise loss. In response, Teodoro declared a state of calamity in the city on November 13 and suspended classes for a month. By November 24, most of the evacuees have returned to their homes. Interior and Local Government Secretary Eduardo Año spoke favorably of the city government's response to the typhoon, which he credited with avoiding the scale of casualties experienced during Tropical Storm Ondoy in 2009.

Later that year, Teodoro submitted a complaint to the Department of Environment and Natural Resources against BFCT, a construction firm owned by the family of Bayani Fernando. Teodoro attributed the extensive flooding to the construction firm's land reclamation project along the Marikina River. Fernando denied Teodoro's claims, commenting that the flooding was the result of the narrowing of the river and the construction of the Manalo Bridge. The department would ultimately approve Teodoro's request to remove the reclaimed land, which resulted in his ouster from the Nationalist People's Coalition. Teodoro and his allies would later migrate to the United Nationalist Alliance.

=== Suspension ===
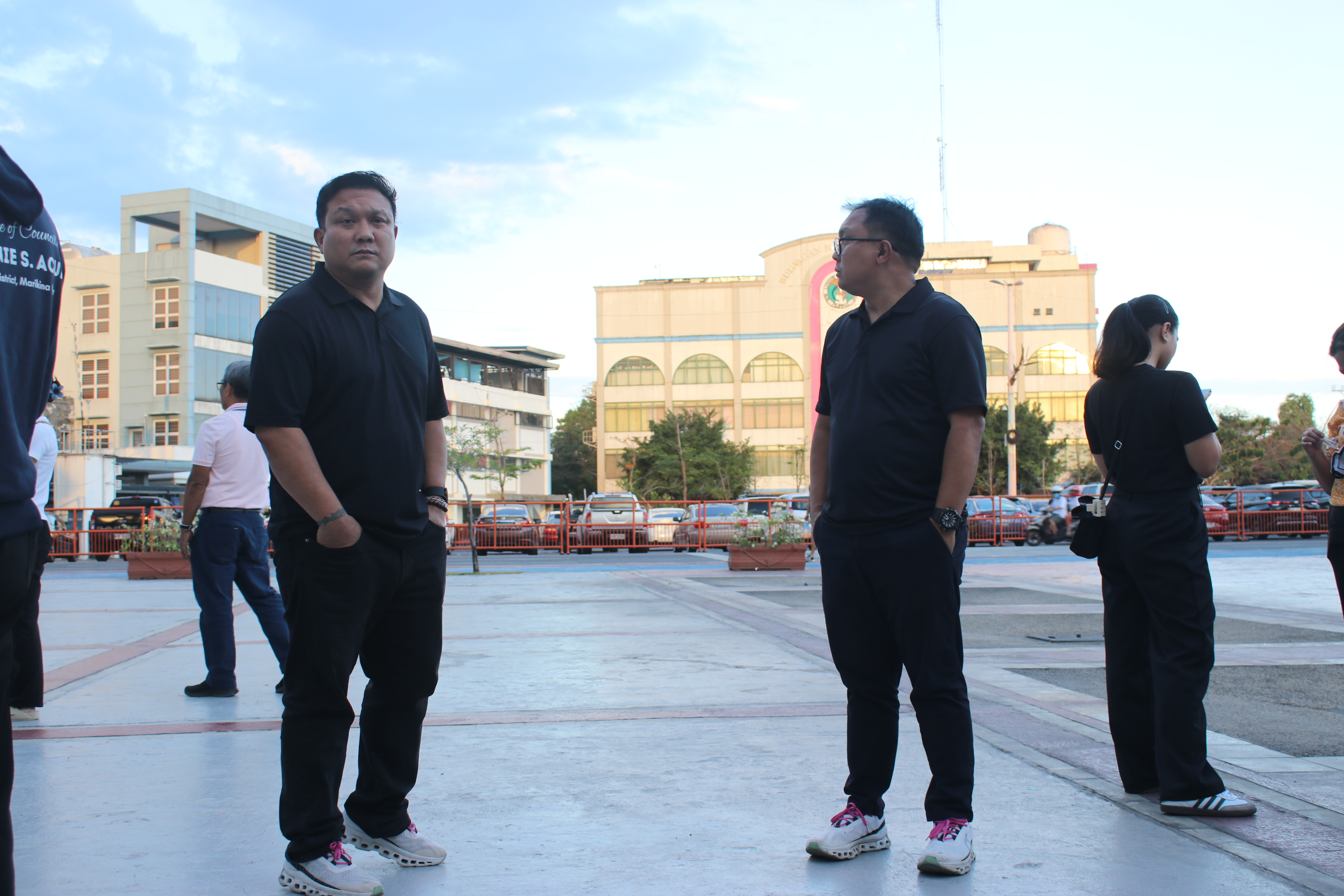
Ronnie (left) and Rommel Acuña (right) in 2025, shortly before being sworn in as acting vice mayor and acting mayor respectively.

On April 26, 2024, Sofronio Dulay, a college professor and former mayoral candidate, filed a technical malversation complaint against Teodoro and three other Marikina officials for allegedly misusing ₱130 million in PhilHealth funds allocated for health system enhancements under the Universal Health Care Act; his complaint was accepted by the Office of the Ombudsman in August 2024.

On March 25, 2025, the Office of the Ombudsman suspended Teodoro, along with several members of his administration, for six months as part of an investigation into the complaint. Teodoro's camp condemned the suspension as "a broader effort to derail" his coalition's campaign. Teodoro himself condemned the suspension as being "politically motivated", saying that it was meant to block his candidacy in the House of Representatives for the 2025 election.

The mayoral organization Mayors for Good Governance, which Teodoro is a member of, urged the office to conduct a "just and transparent investigation" on the complaint against Teodoro. In response to the suspension order, the DILG appointed twin councilors Rommel and Ronnie Acuña as acting mayor and vice mayor respectively to ensure the continuity of government operations during the suspension.

== House of Representatives (since 2025) ==
=== Election ===
Leading up to the 2025 elections, Teodoro's administration partnered with Senator Koko Pimentel and his wife, diplomat Kathryna, in implementing projects in the city. During this time, they forged an informal agreement in which Teodoro would run for representative in the second district while Pimentel would run in the first. On October 5, 2024, Teodoro filed his candidacy for representative in Marikina's first district, contradicting their agreement and prompting Pimentel to challenge him in the contest. While Teodoro stated that the Pimentels ended their alliance on July 28, Pimentel maintained that he was "surprised" by Teodoro's decision to run in the first district, criticizing him for having "no word of honor".

The first division of the Commission on Elections (COMELEC) went on to cancel Teodoro's candidacy on December 11, citing failure to meet residency requirements. He condemned the decision as being "politically motivated" and described the move as an effort to discredit his administration. Two notarized documents submitted by Teodoro in July and September 2024 indicated that his legal residence was in Tumana, a barangay in the second district. Although Teodoro submitted documents to prove residency in San Roque in the first district, the commission deemed those inconclusive. While his case continued to be unresolved, Teodoro's name remained on the ballot, and he was allowed to continue his congressional campaign, which Pimental condemned as "constitutionally defective".

During the campaign, he maintained support from organizations and individuals aligned with his administration. His supporters included the Association of Clans in Marikina, which defended Teodoro and regarded his mayoral suspension and subsequent cancellation of candidacy as being politically motivated and slanderous. Before the campaign period began, his supporters gathered at the Marikina Freedom Park for a protest and prayer vigil over the mayor's suspension.

==== Results and aftermath ====
Teodoro's margin of victory by barangay Legend: 30–40% >40%

In the May 12 election, Teodoro defeated Pimentel in a landslide, winning in all nine barangays within the district. In response, the COMELEC suspended his proclamation as the winning candidate, owing to his pending disqualification case.

On June 25, the COMELEC en banc reversed the first division's decision and lifted the suspension order on Teodoro, deeming the petitioners' evidence insufficient in proving material misrepresentation. The commission also ruled that Teodoro was able to prove his residency claim through official documents, identity documents, and affidavits from local residents and barangay officials proving that he had legally returned to his San Roque residence and had legitimate historical ties to the district. COMELEC Chairman George Garcia inhibited himself from the case, as Teodoro and Pimentel were both his former clients.

Teodoro welcomed the decision, describing the ruling as "a victory for the people of Marikina". Pimentel criticized the time it took for the COMELEC to reach a decision, placing doubt on the integrity of the case and announcing plans to contest the verdict in the Supreme Court.

=== Early tenure ===
The COMELEC declared their decision final on July 1, after which Teodoro was sworn into office later that day at the Marikina Justice Hall. In response to his delayed proclamation, he filed administrative charges against the local COMELEC officer overseeing his candidacy, citing contempt of the commission's directive. In an interview with the Daily Tribune shortly after taking office, he cited flood control projects, education, and health as his legislative priorities. On February 25, 2026, Teodoro was sworn in as a member of the Commission on Appointments.

== Personal life ==
Teodoro is married to high school teacher Maan Ang, who has served as the representative for Marikina's first district since 2022. Together, they have two children.

=== Legal issues ===
On September 25, 2025, two female police officers who previously served as Teodoro's security aides filed charges of acts of lasciviousness and rape against him. In response, Teodoro filed charges of perjury against them on October 13. On August 18, 2026, the National Prosecution Service recommended the filing of four counts of rape by sexual assault and one count of acts of lasciviousness against Teodoro, transmitting the information records of the former cases to a regional trial court in Marikina and the latter to a metropolitan trial court. Serving as Teodoro's legal counsel is Alma Fernandez-Mallonga.

== Electoral history ==
Electoral history of Marcelino Teodoro
Year	Office	Party	Votes received				Result
Year	Office	Party	Total	%	P.	Swing	Result
1992	Councilor (at-large)	Independent	16,978	—N/a	2nd	—N/a	Won
1995	Councilor (at-large)	Lakas–Laban	27,566	—N/a	2nd	—N/a	Won
1998	Councilor (at-large)	Independent	39,202	—N/a	1st	—N/a	Won
2007	Representative (Marikina–1st)	Lakas–CMD	32,574	54.65%	1st	—N/a	Won
2010	Representative (Marikina–1st)	Liberal	47,425	67.48%	1st	+12.83%	Won
2013	Representative (Marikina–1st)	Liberal	58,123	100.00%	1st	+32.52%	Won
2016	Mayor of Marikina	NPC	90,810	50.17%	1st	—N/a	Won
2019	Mayor of Marikina	PDP–Laban	158,024	100.00%	1st	+49.83%	Won
2022	Mayor of Marikina	UNA	183,878	82.07%	1st	-17.93%	Won
2025	Representative (Marikina–1st)	NUP	75,062	72.07%	1st	—N/a	Won

== Notes ==
Political offices
Preceded by Del de Guzman	Mayor of Marikina; 2016–2025	Succeeded by Maan Teodoro
House of Representatives of the Philippines
Preceded by Maan Teodoro	Member of the House of Representatives of the Philippines from Marikina's 1st district 2025–present	Incumbent
New district	Member of the House of Representatives of the Philippines from Marikina's 1st district 2007–2016	Succeeded by Bayani Fernando
