= 2019 Marikina local elections =

8th City elections in Marikina

- May 13, 2019
- Turnout: 74.02% ▼9.13 pp
- Mayoral election
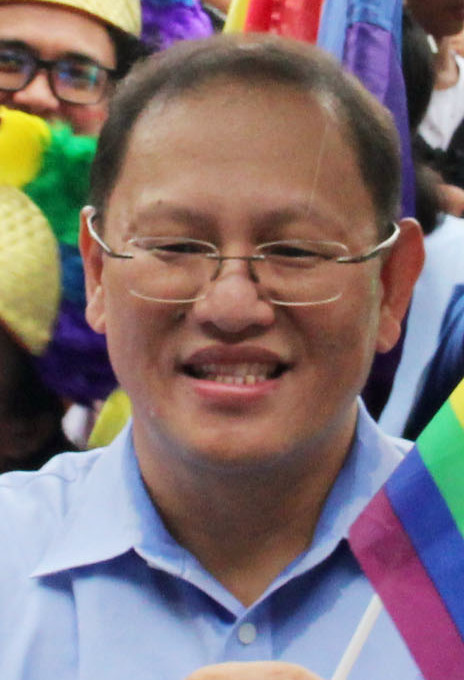

Candidate	Marcelino Teodoro
Party	PDP–Laban
Running mate	Marion Andres
Popular vote	158,024
Percentage	86.75%
Mayor before election
Marcelino Teodoro
NPC
Elected mayor
Marcelino Teodoro
NPC
- Vice mayoral election
Candidate	Marion Andres	Eva Aguirre-Paz	Vic "Tambuli" Sambinano
Party	NPC	Independent	PDDS
Popular vote	104,165	51,585	12,300
Percentage	61.98%	30.70%	7.32%
Vice Mayor before election
Jose Fabian Cadiz
Liberal
Elected Vice Mayor
Marion Andres
NPC

Local elections were held at Marikina on May 13, 2019, as part of the Philippine general election. Held concurrently with the national elections, the electorate voted to elect a mayor, a vice mayor, sixteen city council members and two district representatives to congress. Those elected took their respective offices on June 30, 2019, for a three-year-long term.

Marcelino Teodoro and Marion Andres were elected to the mayoralty and vice mayoralty respectively, with the Teodoro being re-elected to his second term and Andres being elected back to the office for a fourth nonconsecutive term. Team MarCy, a coalition between the Nationalist People's Coalition and PDP–Laban won an outright majority in the city council, winning ten seats in the council.

Bayani Fernando and Stella Quimbo were elected to represent the first and second districts respectively in the 18th Congress, with the former being re-elected for his second term and the latter being elected for her first. Both representatives joined the minority bloc.

== Background ==
In the 2016 elections, Marcelino Teodoro was elected to the mayoralty, defeating then-incumbent mayor Del de Guzman who was first elected in 2010. On the other hand, Jose Fabian Cadiz, De Guzman's vice mayor was re-elected to a third term, defeating former mayor Marion Andres.

Teodoro is running for re-election for a second term with Marion Andres once again being his running mate. Incumbent councilor Eva Aguirre-Paz and Vic Tambuli Sambinano are also running for the vice mayoralty, with the latter substituting for Arnolfo Almocera who later opted to run for a seat in the City Council instead.

Lorderito Nebres and Richard Estanislao of PDP–Laban ran for the mayoralty and vice mayoralty respectively, but both withdrew their respective candidacies in February.

=== Electoral system ===
Local elections are held every three years following 1992, on the second Monday of May coinciding with the elections for the national positions. An individual may only be elected to an office for a maximum of three consecutive terms.

== Mayoral election ==
The incumbent mayor is Marcelino Teodoro, who was elected in 2016 with 50.17% of the vote.

Teodoro was left unopposed when Lorderito Nebres of PDP–Laban withdrew his candidacy in February 2019.

=== Candidates ===
- Marcelino Teodoro (PDP–Laban), incumbent mayor of Marikina, former representative from the 1st district.

==== Withdrew ====
- Lorderito Nebres (PDP–Laban)

=== Results ===
Marikina mayoral election
Party	Candidate	Votes	%
PDP–Laban	Marcelino Teodoro (incumbent)	158,024	86.75%
Valid ballots		158,024	86.75%
Invalid or blank votes		24,140	13.25%
Total votes		182,164	100.00%
PDP–Laban hold			

== Vice mayoral election ==
The incumbent vice mayor is Jose Fabian Cadiz, who was re-elected in 2016 with 54.76% of the vote. Cadiz is term-limited; he briefly sought congressional seat for the first district before withdrawing from the race.

Former Vice Mayor Marion Andres ran as Teodoro's running mate. Andres had previously ran for the post in the last election, being defeated by Cadiz. Incumbent Councilor Eva Aguirre-Paz ran a standalone campaign; while Team ViCe slated Vic Tambuli as their vice mayoral candidate following the withdrawal of Arnolfo Almocera, who would later run for councilor. Richard Estanislao of PDP–Laban withdrew his candidacy in February.

=== Candidates ===
- Marion Andres (NPC), former vice mayor of Marikina, and former councilor from the 1st District.
- Eva Aguirre-Paz (Independent), incumbent councilor from the 1st District.
- Vic Tambuli Sambinano (PDDS), former councilor from the 1st District.

==== Withdrew ====
- Richard Estanislao (PDP–Laban)

=== Results ===
Marikina vice mayoral election
Party	Candidate	Votes	%
NPC	Marion Andres	104,165	61.98
Independent	Eva Aguirre-Paz	51,585	30.70
PDDS	Vic Tambuli Sabiniano	12,300	7.32
Total votes		168,050	100.00

== House of Representatives elections ==
Held concurrently with the local elections, two representatives from the city's congressional districts were elected to represent their respective districts in the House of Representatives. In the 2016 elections, Bayani Fernando and Miro Quimbo were elected to represent the first and second districts respectively. Fernando is in the majority bloc of the chamber while Quimbo is in the independent minority.

2019 Philippine House of Representatives Elections in Marikina
Party	Candidates	Seats Before	Seats Won	Seat Change	Votes	Percentage
Liberal Party	2	1	1	Steady	93,330	56.45%
Nationalist People's Coalition	1	1	1	Steady	56,553	34.20%
Independents	2	0	0	Steady	15,456	9.35%
Total	5	2	2		165,339	100.00%

=== First district ===
The incumbent representative is Bayani Fernando, who was elected in 2016 with 54.21% of the vote.

Outgoing vice mayor Jose Fabian Cadiz ran a brief campaign for the seat but later opted to withdraw from the race. His name ultimately remained in the ballot come election day.

==== Candidates ====
- Bayani Fernando (NPC) incumbent representative and former mayor of Marikina.

===== Withdrew =====
- Jose Fabian Cadiz (Liberal), incumbent vice mayor of Marikina.

==== Results ====
2019 Philippine House of Representatives election in Marikina's 1st district
Party	Candidate	Votes	%
NPC	Bayani Fernando (incumbent)	56,553	71.37
Liberal	Jose Fabian Cadiz	13,732	17.33
Valid ballots		70,285	88.69%
Invalid or blank votes		8,964	11.31%
Total votes		79,239	100.00%
NPC hold			

=== Second district ===
The incumbent representative is Miro Quimbo, who was re-elected in 2016 with 84.68% of the vote. Quimbo is term-limited and is ineligible to run for re-election.

The Liberal Party slated Miro's wife, Stella, to run in his place. Stella faced a challenge from Eugene de Vera, a former representative for ABS Partylist running as an independent, and independent Mauro Arce.

==== Candidates ====
- Mauro Arce (Independent)
- Eugene de Vera (Independent), former representative for ABS Partylist
- Stella Quimbo (Liberal), former commissioner of the Philippine Competition Commission and wife of Miro Quimbo

==== Results ====
2019 Philippine House of Representatives election in Marikina's 2nd district
Party	Candidate	Votes	%
Liberal	Stella Quimbo	79,598	83.74
Independent	Eugene de Vera	13,995	14.72
Independent	Mauro Arce	1,461	1.54
Valid ballots		95,054	92.35%
Invalid or blank votes		7,871	7.65
Total votes		102,925	100.00
Liberal hold			

== City Council elections ==
=== Tickets ===
As the mayor, vice mayor and the members of the city council are elected on the same ballot, mayoral candidates may present or endorse a slate of city council candidates. These slates usually run with their respective mayoral and vice mayoral candidates along with the other members of their slate. A group of candidates independent of any mayoral or vice mayoral candidate may also form a slate consisting of themselves.

==== Team MarCy ====
NPC/PDP-Laban/Team MarCy (1st District)
Name	Party
Serafin "Bodjie" Bernardino	PDP–Laban
Bernard Bernardo	NPC
Leanor Carlos	PDP–Laban
Cloyd Casimiro	NPC
Kate de Guzman	NPC
Herbert "Boyet" Mascarina	NPC
Thaddeus Antonio "Boy Bolok" Santos Jr.	PDP–Laban
Manny Sarmiento	NPC

NPC/PDP-Laban/Team MarCy (2nd District)
Name	Party
Rosanna Montoya-Cruz	NPC
Paul Dayao	PDP–Laban
Donn Carlo Favis	PDP–Laban
Jaren Feliciano	NPC
Angelito Nunez	NPC
Hilario "Larry" Punzalan	NPC
Ruben "Bogs" Reyes	PDP–Laban
Loreto "Coach Elvis" Tolentino	NPC

==== Apat na Tapat ====
LP/Apat na Tapat (1st District)
Name	Party
Rommel "Kambal" Acuña	Liberal
Frankie Ayuson	Liberal
Willie "Manager" Chavez	Liberal
Samuel Ferriol	Independent

LP/Apat na Tapat (2nd District)
Name	Party
Ariel Cuaresma	Liberal
Levy de Guzman	Liberal
Renato "Bong" Magtubo	Liberal
Joel Relleve	Liberal

==== Team VICe ====
PDDS/PFP/Team VICe (1st District)
Name	Party
Arnolfo "Ama" Almocera	PDDS
Siegfredo "Direk Willy" Andrade	PFP
Crisologo Aquino	PDDS
Romeo "Hugo" Cruz, Jr.	PFP
Ramon Liangko	PFP
Roland Vitalico	PDDS

PDDS/PFP/Team VICe (2nd District)
Name	Party
Marky Castaner	PDDS
Jesus "Pastor Jess" Llantada	PDDS
Rommel Ortiz	PDDS
Salvador "Buddy" Sabinorio	PDDS
Rodolfo "Balong" Sanchez	PFP
Romeo Silva	PDDS

=== Results ===
==== First district ====
Marikina Council Election – 1st District
Party	Candidate	Votes	%
Independent	Samuel Ferriol	47,396	59.81
PDP–Laban	Thaddeus Antonio "Boy Bolok" Santos Jr.	42,210	53.27
NPC	Kate de Guzman	40,499	51.11
PDP–Laban	Serafin "Bodjie" Bernardino	35,103	44.3
Liberal	Rommel "Kambal" Acuña	35,546	44.86
PMP	Carl Africa	34,361	43.36
NPC	Manny Sarmiento	29,483	37.21
NPC	Cloyd Casimiro	26,370	33.28
NPC	Bernard Bernardo	25,143	31.73
Liberal	Frankie Ayuson	24,859	31.37
NPC	Herbert "Boyet" Mascarina	23,479	29.63
PDP–Laban	Leanor Carlos	22,803	28.78
Independent	Igmidio "Medick" Ferrer	22,080	27.87
Independent	Roland "Randy" Banzon	21,886	27.62
Independent	Edward Limsico	20,551	25.94
Liberal	Willie "Manager" Chavez	19,046	24.04
Independent	Ferdinand Marco	17,395	21.95
PDDS	Arnolfo "Ama" Almocera	7,216	9.11
PFP	Siegfredo "Direk Willy" Andrade	3,408	4.3
Independent	Luzviminda Samson	3,282	4.14
PFP	Romeo "Hugo" Cruz, Jr.	2,735	3.45
PDDS	Crisologo Aquino	2,657	3.35
PFP	Ramon Liangko	2,115	2.67
PDDS	Roland Vitalico	1,028	1.3
Total votes		509,651	100.00

==== Second district ====
Marikina Council Election – 2nd District
Party	Candidate	Votes	%
PDP–Laban	Donn Carlo Favis	57,940	56.29
Liberal	Levy de Guzman	55,338	53.77
PDP–Laban	Paul Dayao	48,642	47.26
Liberal	Renato "Bong" Magtubo	46,162	44.85
NPC	Loreto "Coach Elvis" Tolentino	44,137	42.88
NPC	Angelito Nunez	43,366	42.13
PDP–Laban	Ruben "Bogs" Reyes	42,321	41.12
Liberal	Joel Relleve	41,274	40.1
Liberal	Ariel Cuaresma	41,010	39.84
NPC	Jaren Feliciano	40,802	39.64
NPC	Hilario "Larry" Punzalan	36,262	35.23
NPC	Rosanna Montoya-Cruz	28,858	28.04
PMP	Rhyme Enriquez	18,731	18.2
PDDS	Rommel Ortiz	18,340	17.82
Independent	Edwin Adigue	14,125	13.72
Independent	Robert Herrera	11,160	10.84
Independent	Romero Marcelo	10,728	10.42
PDDS	Romeo Silva	9,411	9.14
PDDS	Jesus "Pastor Jess" Llantada	7,717	7.5
Independent	Alexander Villoso	5,696	5.53
Independent	Christopher Bausa	5,034	4.89
PDDS	Marky Castaner	4,917	4.78
Independent	Isagani Tablan	3,733	3.63
PFP	Rodolfo "Balong" Sanchez	2,852	2.77
PDDS	Salvador "Buddy" Sabinorio	1,777	1.73
Total votes		640,333	100.00

== Aftermath ==
Eugene de Vera filed a quo warranto petition against Stella Quimbo, who was elected as the representative for the second district. De Vera claimed that Quimbo was ineligible for the position, citing Section 8 of Republic Act No. 10667 or the Philippine Competition Act, which prohibited former commissioners of the Philippine Competition Commission to run for public office during their tenure and the two-year period following their exit from the office. De Vera also claimed that Quimbo did not disclose her former commissionership by stating that she was a teacher in her certificate of candidacy. Beng Sardillo, Quimbo's legal counsel, had derided as de Vera's interpretation of the act as "patently self-serving, erroneous, and has no legal basis".
