= Pia Ranada =

Filipino journalist

- Pia Ranada in 2025
- Occupation: Journalist
- Awards: John S. Knight Journalism Fellowships at Stanford

Pia Ranada is a Filipino journalist who currently works as the news website Rappler's Head of Community. She rose to prominence after working as a political correspondent at the Malacañang Palace covering the Durterte administration. In 2018, she was banned by President Rodrigo Duterte from entering the Malacañang Palace.

== Career ==
Ranada journalistic career began as a writer-producer on the program Saksi on the GMA Network. After leaving the program, she was recruited by Chay Hofileña, one of the founders of the Rappler news website. Under Hofileña's guidance, she published her first byline for the website in 2011, covering disabled clientele in the Dutch sex industry, which she had originally written while she was still a college student. Ranada mainly wrote lifestyle articles during her first six months of working for Rappler, before she was asked by executive editor Glenda Gloria if she would consider moving to the Nation section of the website. She later stated that after six months she had "decided to try something new" and transferred to cover the environment for the National beat of the website.

While deciding how to cover the upcoming 2016 Philippine presidential election, Rappler editors emailed staff asking if any of them would like to volunteer to report on the candidates. After seeing the Mayor of Davao City, Rodrigo Duterte's name on the list, Ranada volunteered to cover him, in the hope of the website covering her travel to the city. In a later interview she said "my thought was, "Oh, I’ve never been to Davao City. He’s the mayor of Davao City. Maybe if I volunteer, they’ll fly me to Davao City." That was all I was thinking about, as some young, carefree reporter. And yeah, so they gave it to me because nobody else wanted to cover him." She also stated that Duterte's use of death threats and alleged death squads in the city made her to want to cover him.

On 20 February 2018, Rappler reported that Ranada had been barred from entering the presidential palace on the direct order of Duterte after his Christopher Go was questioned about a military contract. The state television news show confirmed the story later that day. Duterte's spokesman Harry Roque accused Ranada of "editorialising" in her reports and stated that she was still permitted to continue reporting the presidential daily brief until a decision was made in court whether to close Rappler. Ranada's palace ban drew condemnation from the National Union of Journalists of the Philippines, who accused Duterte of behaving "much like [a] petulant child throwing a fit". The International Federation of Journalists and the Committee to Protect Journalists also condemned Duterte's actions. She was thought to have been the first journalist to be banned from the palace since President Ferdinand Marcos's dictator regime. Ranada would later say the day of her barring was one of her most difficult days as a journalist.

In 2021, Ranada was one of two Filipino journalists chosen to cover COP26 conference in Glasgow as part of the Climate Change Media Partnership Reporting Fellowship, which selected twenty journalists from developing countries to travel to report on the conference.

== Honors ==
Ranada was one of eight people nominated for the Jaime V. Ongpin Journalism Seminar award. The following year she was one of five journalists chosen to be a International Fellow as part of the John S. Knight Journalism Fellowships at Stanford University.

The Canadian Embassy in the Philippines designated her as a Marshall McLuhan Fellow in 2024 as part of its annual effort to recognize Filipino journalists who show courage, integrity and responsibility. As part of the fellowship, she was invited to complete a study tour in Canada. In February of that year, Ranada spoke at the Marshall McLuhan Forum Series on Responsible Media about the rise of artificially generated content and how to improve public trust in journalism.
