= Venancio Concepción =

Filipino general

The Honorable Venancio Concepción
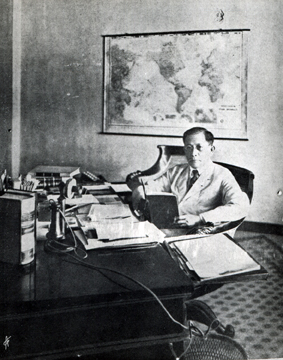
- Unknown photo of Concepcion at Philippine National Bank

President of the Philippine National Bank
- In office 1918–1920
- Governor-General: Francis Burton Harrison
- Preceded by: Samuel Ferguson
- Succeeded by: Samuel Ferguson

Member of the Philippine Assembly from Cagayan's 1st district
- In office October 16, 1909 – October 16, 1912
- Preceded by: Pablo Guzmán
- Succeeded by: Crescencio V. Masigan
- In office May 16, 1914 – October 16, 1916
- Preceded by: Crescencio V. Masigan
- Succeeded by: Vicente T. Fernández

Chief of General Staff of the Philippine Republican Army
- In office January 21, 1899 – June 6, 1899
- President: Emilio Aguinaldo
- Preceded by: Ambrosio Flores
- Succeeded by: Philippine Republican Army defeated

Member of the Malolos Congress from Iloilo
- In office September 18, 1898 – November 13, 1899 Serving with Esteban de la Rama, Melecio Figueroa, and Tiburcio Hilario

Personal details
- Born: Venancio Concepción y Ochoa; May 18, 1861 Alaminos, Pangasinan, Captaincy General of the Philippines
- Died: December 13, 1950 (aged 89) Manila, Philippines
- Party: Nacionalista
- Occupation: Banker; Public servant Soldier; Lawmaker
- Profession: Accountant

Military service
- Allegiance: Philippines
- Branch/service: Philippine Republican Army
- Years of service: 1896 – 1899
- Rank: Heneral de Division

Venancio Concepción y Ochoa (May 18, 1861 – December 13, 1950) was a Filipino general under the leadership of President Emilio Aguinaldo. He fought battles in Iloilo. He represented Iloilo in Malolos Congress.

== Early life and revolutionary career ==
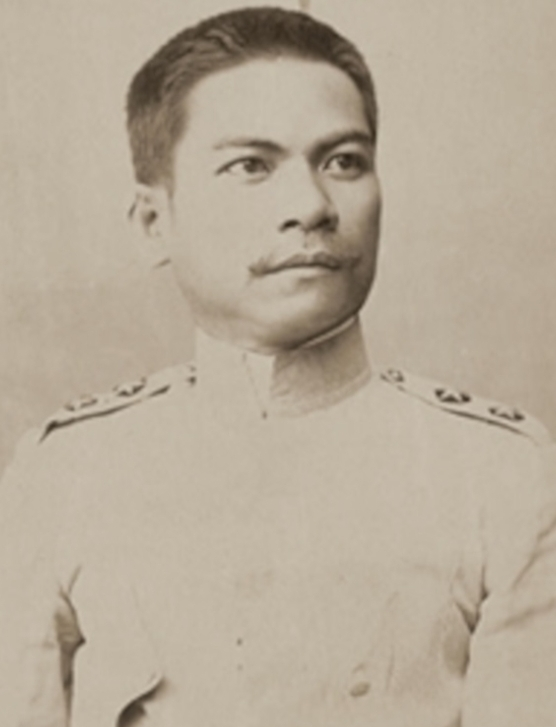
Concepcion in 1898

Concepcion was born on May 18, 1861, in Alaminos, Zambales (now part of Pangasinan). Under the Spanish regime, he worked as an employee in the Treasury and Customs Administration in Iloilo (Administración de Hacienda y Aduana de Iloilo) and served as a counselor for the City Council from 1893 to 1898. Concepcion was also an Iloilo sugar broker. As a member of the Spanish militia, he played a key role in peacekeeping in Panay over which he received several crosses and later joined the Filipino revolutionary forces. He served in Malolos in January 1899 on a special commission by Don Raymundo Melliza and became a general during the war against the Americans.

He was appointed as Chief of General Staff of the Republican Army and he saw action in Central Luzon. However, President Aguinaldo, just hours after Antonio Luna's death on June 5, 1899, immobilized the remaining of Luna's officers and men from the field, including General Concepción, whose headquarters in Angeles, Pampanga. Aguinaldo launched an inspection of firearms the same day Luna was murdered.

== American civil government ==
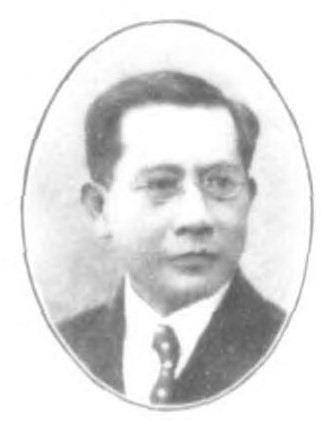
Concepcion as member of the Philippine Assembly, c. 1912

He was taken as a prisoner by the Americans until June 1900 and then moved to Hong Kong in 1901 to discuss peace or the continuation of the Philippine-American War with the Philippine Commission. In Cagayan, he ended chief-ruling or caciquismo, organized Philippine interest committees and nationalist committees, and was elected to the Philippine Assembly representing Cagayan with a majority of 2,101 votes against two opponents: Progresista Party candidate Crescencio Alemeda and independent politician Mariano Canilla.

== As a bank president ==
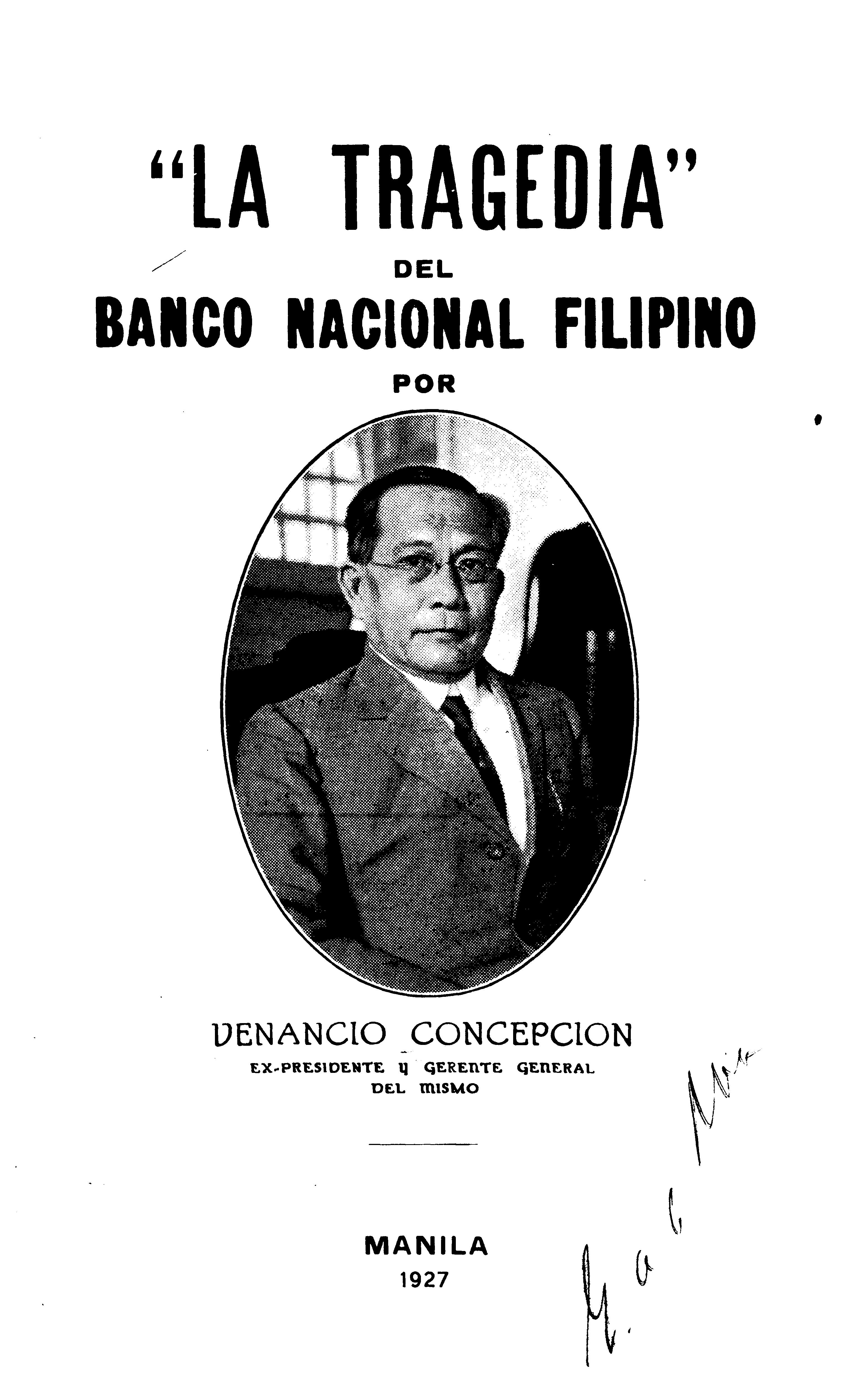
Title page of Venancio Concepcion's La Tragedia del Banco Nacional Filipino, published 1927

During the American period, in 1918, he was appointed as the first Filipino president of the Philippine National Bank, the first universal bank in the Philippines, by the American Governor-General of the Philippines Francis Burton Harrison. He succeeded Henry Parker Willis, who was then appointed director of research of the Federal Reserve Board of Governors, and Samuel Ferguson, who briefly served as the second president until March 1918. Ferguson also served as the bank's vice-president under Willis.

Under Concepcion, the bank made loans to real estate speculators and businesses in the sugar, hemp, and coconut oil industries, often based on connections rather than sound financial assessments. This led to concerns about the bank's lending practices. When Archibald Harrison, an American director of the bank, investigated these concerns and discovered irregularities, Concepcion intervened by influencing the Philippine Legislature to cut off funding for the investigation, ultimately leading to Harrison's resignation. By the time of Concepcion's forced resignation in 1920, the PNB had invested P44.1 million on Filipino-owned sugar mills, mostly given to dominant planter families in Negros. Such planter families include the Yulos in Binalbagan, the Montillas in Isabela, the Lizareses in Talisay, and the Aranetas in Bago. In 1922, Francis Coates Jr., a special auditor for the PNB, stated that the bank had given a capitalization of "40 percent greater than normal" for these mills making it impossible for these borrowers to pay back their loans.

Concepcion also facilitated a capital transfer by using planters' haciendas as security for loans to undercapitalized Filipino milling firms, including a P2.2 million loan to Bacolod-Murcia Milling Company.

However, in 1920, he was tried and convicted of fraud. In July 1921, he was again arrested for corruption by American authorities. The Wood-Forbes report in 1921 went into detail about his past crimes and his incompetence as bank president. Due to the Wood-Forbes report, his reputation further decline. Shortly after his arrest, Senator Manuel L. Quezon, in a conversation with Army Chief of Staff Frank R. McCoy, said that the Philippine National Bank's disaster was "brought about by Osmeña's belief that Concepcion could manage the bank." House Speaker Sergio Osmeña supported Concepcion's candidacy as bank president. Quezon then emphasized that Osmeña was also responsible for the PNB.

On November 29, 1922, Concepcion was tried before the Philippine Supreme Court for his grave misconduct against the Filipino people, specifically for violating banking laws. He pleaded to the court that he acted in good faith but was deemed to be irrelevant due to public policy.

He was succeeded by Samuel Ferguson as bank president in 1920.

== Legacy ==
Despite being known as a revolutionary during the Philippine-American War, Concepcion's bank policies had a long-lasting impact in the Philippines up until the presidency of Ferdinand Marcos in the 1970s. By 1921-22, Concepcion's policies allocated 26% of the PNB's P167 million assets for low-interest, 20-year loans to Negros sugar mills. This created a lasting claim on PNB's resources, leading to significant funding for sugar over the years. In 1970, the PNB loaned P447.5 million for sugar, far more than its loans for rice (P130.4 million) and coconuts (P44.2 million), with Negros farms receiving much higher average crop loans than other regions such as Central Luzon and Pampanga since the 1930s. Acting secretary of finance, Vicente Singson Encarnacion, stated in the Tribune (1934) that "excessive attention was given to the development of the sugar industry while practically abandoning the other industries."
