= Bago, Negros Occidental =

Component city in Negros Occidental, Philippines

Bago
- Component city
- City of Bago
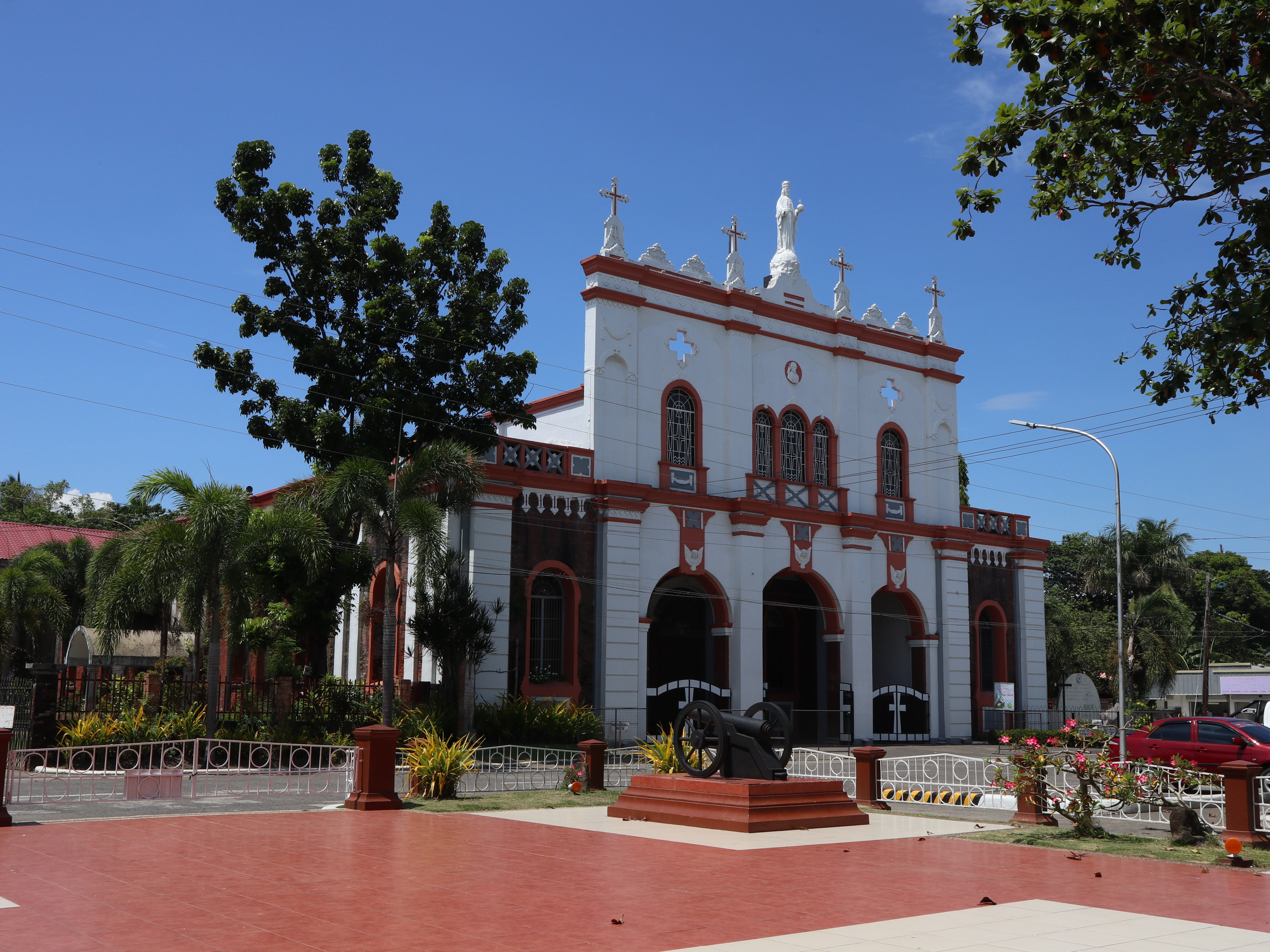
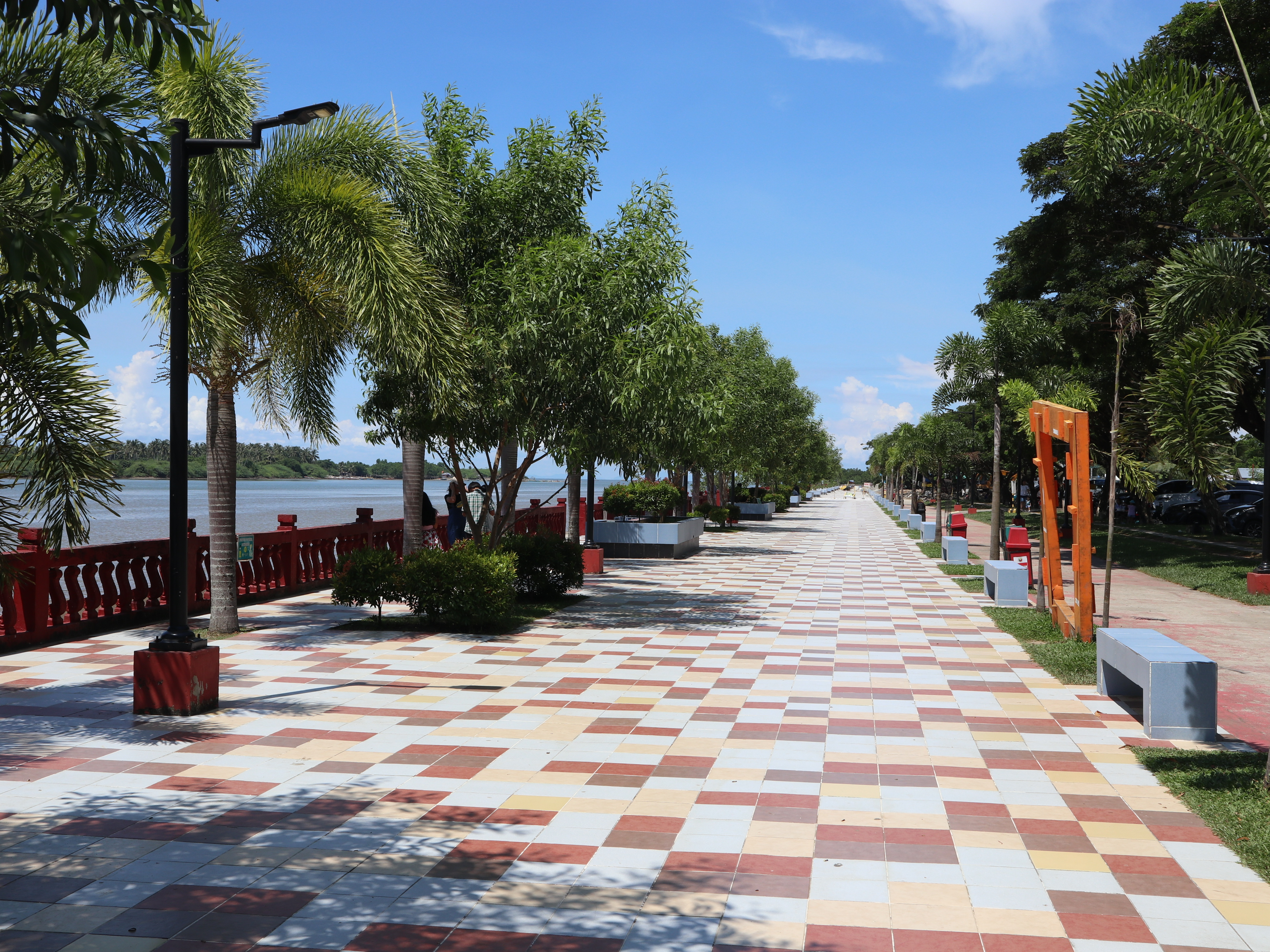
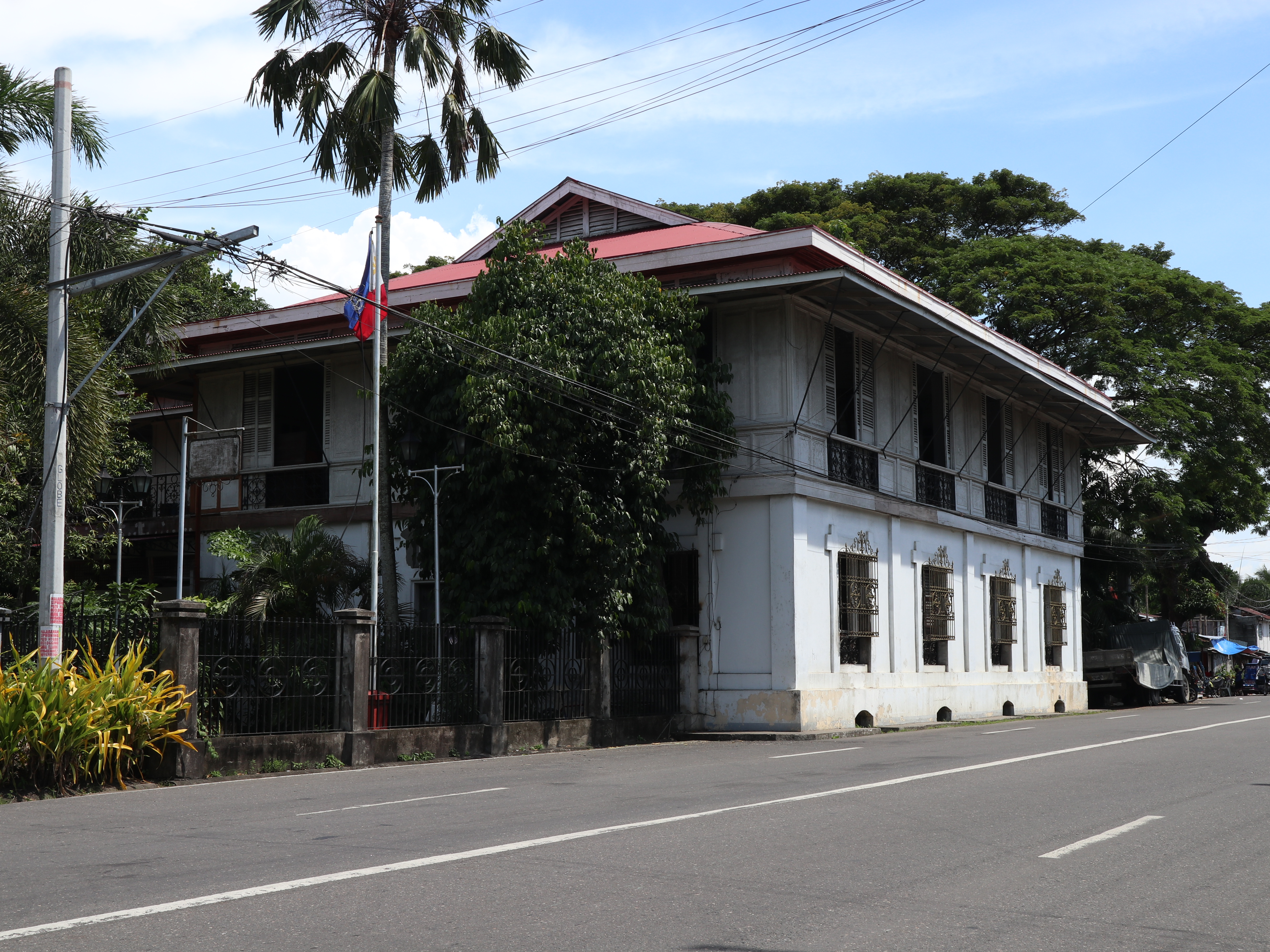
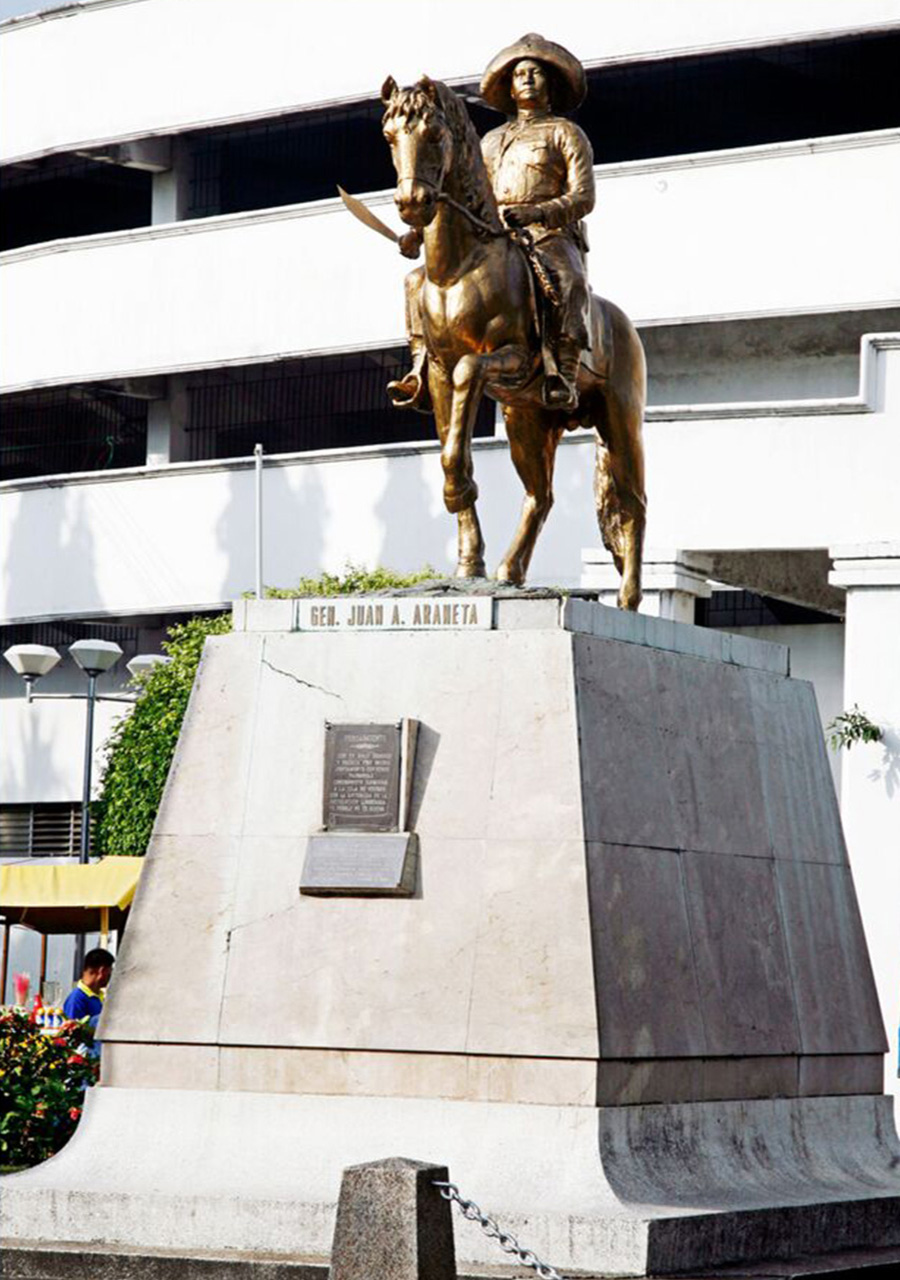
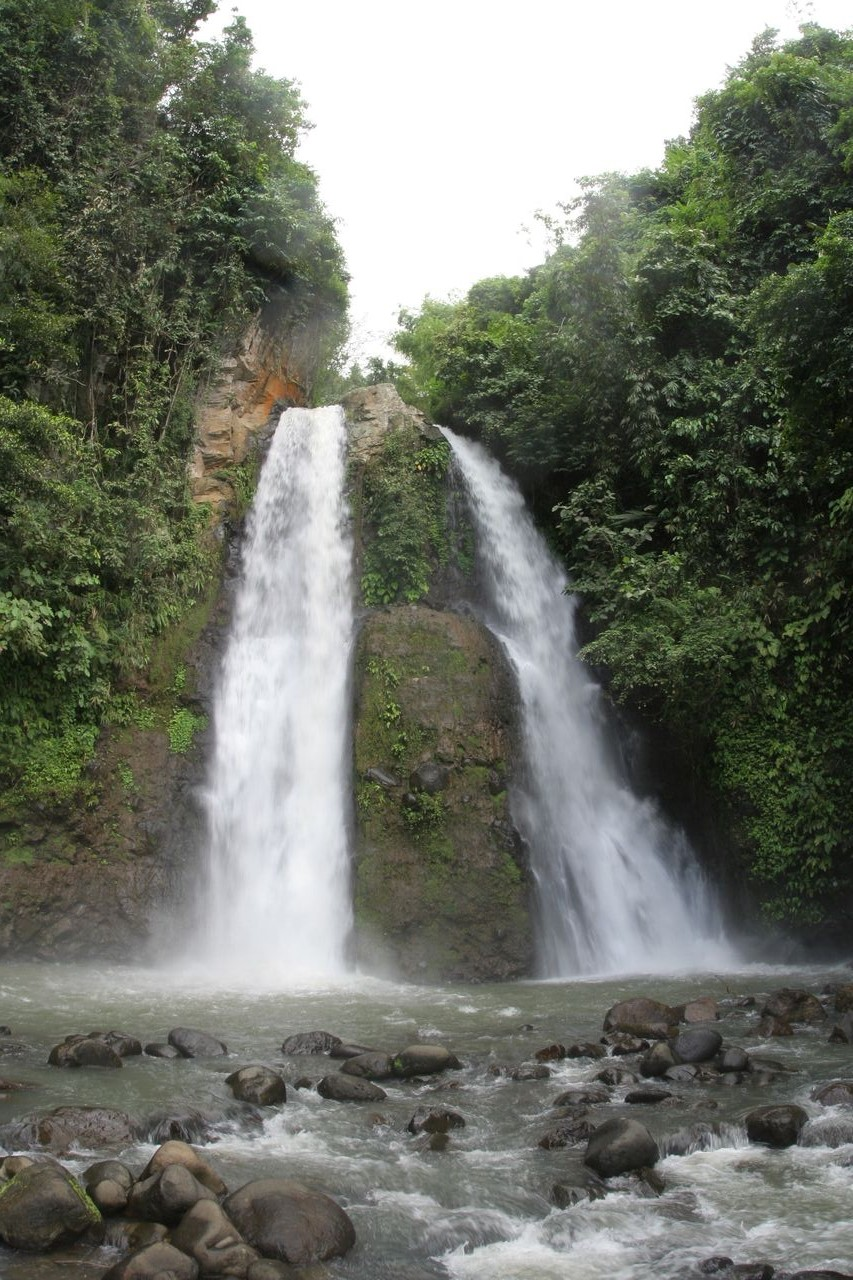
- From top, left to right: Saint John the Baptist Parish, Bantayan Park, Balay ni Tan Juan, Tan Juan Monument, Kipot Twin Falls.

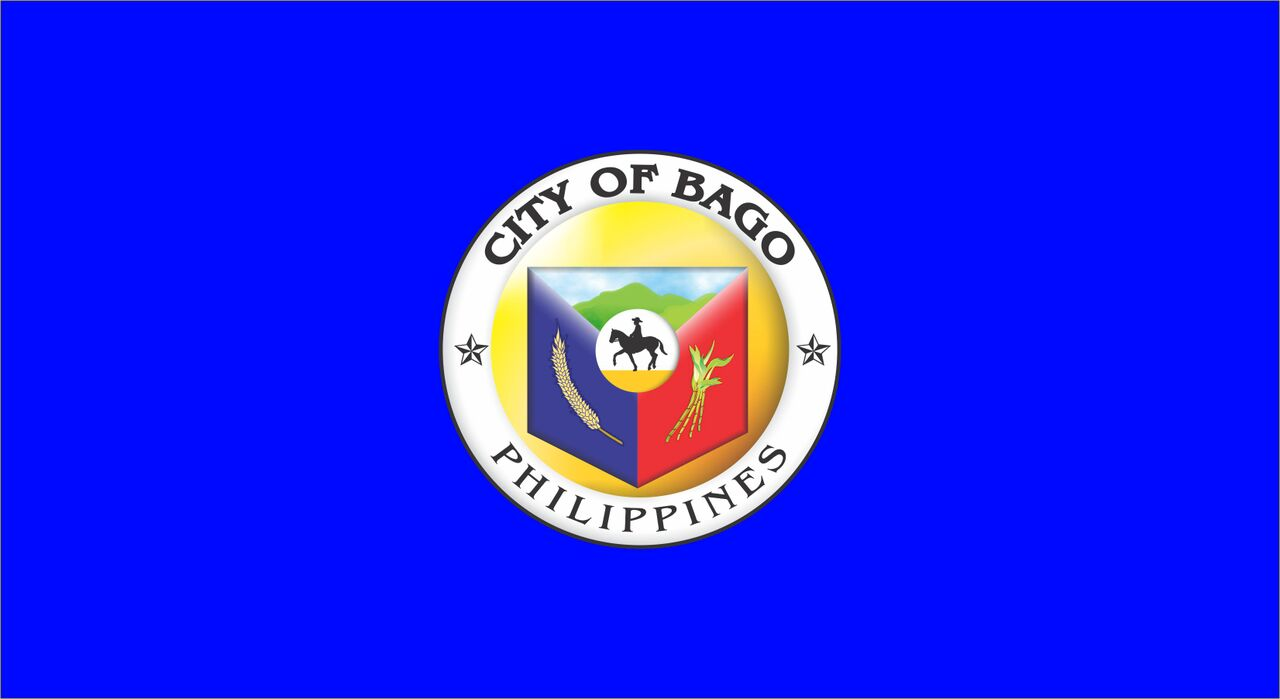
- Flag Seal
- Nicknames: "Home of Historical and Natural Treasures"; "Boxing Capital of the Philippines"
- Motto(s): "Asenso Bago" (2025–present) "Go, Bago!" (Former)
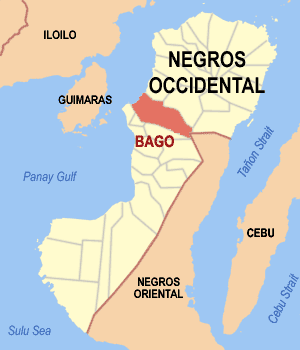
- Map of Negros Occidental with Bago highlighted
- Interactive map of Bago
- Location within the Philippines
- Coordinates: 10°32′20″N 122°50′18″E
- Country: Philippines
- Region: Negros Island Region
- Province: Negros Occidental
- District: 4th district
- Launched: June 24, 1575
- Cityhood: February 19, 1966
- Boroughs: 24 (see Barangays)

Government
  - Type: Sangguniang Panlungsod
  - Mayor: Marina Javellana-Yao
  - Vice Mayor: Andrew Martin Y. Torres (UNegA)
  - Representative: Jeffrey P. Ferrer (NUP)
  - City Council: Members: Victor Michael A. Javellana; Ma. Josefa Y. Matti; Robert J. Javellana; Jake Patrick Y. Torres; Ma. Femmy Alvarez-Martir; Joseph J. Colmenares; Jorge Agustin A. Araneta; Imelda M. Precion; Leonilo N. Del Carmen; Jozsef Mark Dexter M. Somcio; Jovito M. Gahaton ^{‡}; Julianae V. Lavadia ^{◌}; ‡ ex officio ABC president; ◌ ex officio SK chairman
  - Electorate: 103,138 voters (2025)

Area
  - Total: 401.20 km^{2} (154.90 sq mi)
- Elevation: 187 m (614 ft)
- Highest elevation: 2,436 m (7,992 ft)
- Lowest elevation: 0 m (0 ft)

Population (2024 census)
  - Total: 192,993
  - Density: 481.04/km^{2} (1,245.9/sq mi)
  - Households: 47,427
- Demonym: Bagonhon

Economy
  - Income class: 1st city income class
  - Poverty incidence: 21.82% (2023)
  - Revenue: ₱ 1,537 million (2024)
  - Assets: ₱ 3,341 million (2024)
  - Expenditure: ₱ 1,426 million (2024)
  - Liabilities: ₱ 774.5 million (2024)

Service provider
  - Electricity: Negros Electric and Power Corporation (NEPC)
- Time zone: UTC+8 (PST)
- ZIP code: 6101
- PSGC: 064502000
- IDD : area code: +63 (0)34
- Native languages: Hiligaynon; Tagalog
- Website: www.bagocity.gov.ph

Bago, officially the City of Bago (Hiligaynon: Dakbanwa/Syudad sang Bago; Filipino: Lungsod ng Bago), is a component city in the province of Negros Occidental, Philippines. According to the 2024 census, it has a population of 192,993 people.

It is also known as the “Home of Historical and Natural Treasures”, in recognition of its contributions to the history of Negros Occidental and the Philippines, as well as its rich landscapes, flora, and fauna that support its reputation as an ecotourism destination. The city is likewise referred to as the “Boxing Capital of the Philippines” due to the prominence of notable boxers it has produced. It is also home to one of only three known populations of the endangered Irrawaddy dolphin in the entire Philippines, with the other populations found in Guimaras and Palawan. All three are classified as critically endangered.

== Etymology ==
The community was named after a large tree called “bágo” (Gnetum gnemon) under which a native prince Mapagic died according to the writings of a Spanish historian, Diego de Povedano. Another version, however, noted that the name came from the shrub, bago-bago that grew abundantly in the riverbanks.

== History ==
=== Precolonial Times ===
Bago was already a barangay mentioned in the epic of Maragtas as a Constituent Barangay of the Kedatuan of Madja-as and it was settled during and after the victory against Chola-occupied Srivijaya, after the sack of Odtojan; where the compromised Rajahs and Sultans who accepted higher positions by corrupt means were carted off to become slaves, Maharlika, and Alipin to serve the Datus of the Philippines along with the native Ati recruits and Malays who accompanied the siege and reconquest as well as evacuation of Odtojan, where the victorious army and navy returned to the Kedatuan with their war booty.

=== Spanish Era ===
Its history has its beginning on September 6, 1571, when the Spanish Adelantado, Miguel Lopez de Legaspi, allotted the community to a Spaniard named Juan Gutiérrez de Cortés as his "encomienda". At that time, the community was still composed of small clusters of settlements along the banks of a big river which later became known as the Bago River. The "encomendero", since then, administered to the spiritual and socio-economic needs of the natives in the settlements until June 1578; however, a year before that, this community was placed under the evangelical visitations of Fr. Gerónimo Marín, OSA, an Augustinian priest who had taken charge of the Christianization of the natives of Binalbagan since the year 1572. Father Marín, upon his arrival in the community, celebrated the feast of St. John the Baptist, who would later be accepted as the patron saint of the place. Following the traditions and practices of the Spanish missionaries and historians in recording the founding of a "pueblo" or town that usually coincides with the feast day of a saint and since the feast day of St. John the Baptist, falls on June 24 of each year, it follows thereof that Bago was founded on June 24, 1575. History only records 1575 as the year when Bago was founded so that the exact month and day can only be deduced from such traditional practices of the Spaniards. Manila, Cebu and Binalbagan also predicted the dates of their founding on the same historical situations; hence, the logical conclusion is that Bago was officially founded on the month, day and year heretofore mentioned.

As regards on how the town acquired its name, according to the manuscript of a Spanish historian, Diego López Povedano, which is available in the library of the University of San Carlos, Cebu City, the town was named after a large tree called "Bago" under which, a prince by the name of Mapagic died.

Another historical version is that the place got its name from a shrub called "bago-bago" which was then growing luxuriantly along the river banks.

=== 17th century ===
From the year 1575 up to the close of the 16th century, no historical account was written about the community. Bago came into the historical scene again when, at early part of the 17th century, a group of settlers settled along the banks of Bago River. The arrival of these settlers merged into a sizable village capable of self- governance. In later years, the descendants of these settlers petitioned the Spanish authorities to declare their village a "pueblo" or town and to name it "Bago". Among the petitioners were Manuel Sitchon, Gregorio Varela, Paulino Torres, Jacinto Araneta, Clemente Celis, Mariano Gonzaga and Fernando Villanueva. The said petition was finally granted by the Spanish authorities in the year 1800; thus, Bago officially attained the status of a "pueblo" or town in that same year.

=== 19th century ===
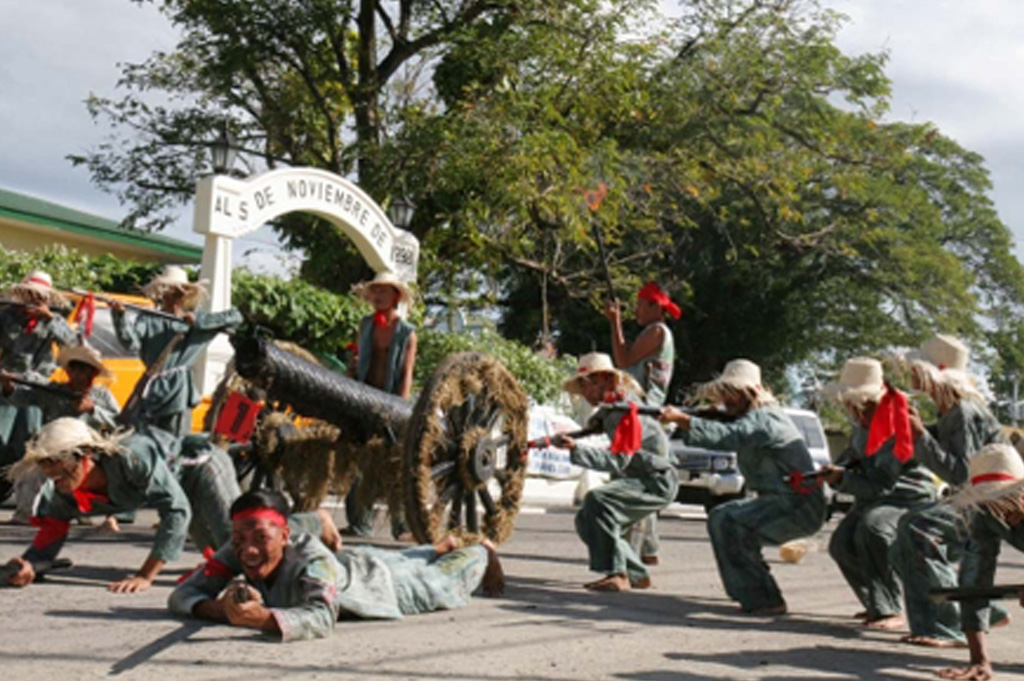
Reenactment of Cinco de Noviembre held annually in Bago

Between the years 1800 and 1898, the inhabitants of Bago are among those who suffered tremendously under the Spanish tyranny, injustice and oppression. This social condition finally led to a great revolt on November 5, 1898, when on this day, General Juan Anacleto Araneta rallied his people in the struggle for freedom. This historic event was chronicled in a historical marker found in the city public plaza of Bago which bears the following inscriptions:

Republica de Negros

In this plaza of Bago was proclaimed the

Republica de Negros by the Revolutionary

Forces led by General Juan Anacleto Araneta,

5 of November, 1898. Witnessed by Ananias

Diokno, representative of the Central

Revolutionary Government. This Republic

acknowledged the authority of the First

Philippine Republic under Emilio Aguinaldo.

Together with General Aniceto Lacson who led the forces in Talisay, he was able to force the capitulation of the Spanish garrison at Bacolod thus putting an end to the Spanish sovereignty in the province. Forthwith, a revolutionary government was established with General Juan A. Araneta as the acting governor. The Municipality of Bago, an election was held and Ramon del Castillo became the first elected municipal president who served in such capacity from the year 1898 up to the year 1900.

=== 20th century ===
In April 1901, the Americans came and established a civil government in the province of Negros Occidental which completely abolished the revolutionary government of General Araneta. Bago as one of the towns that were placed under the control of the Americans; however, they allowed the municipality to be governed by Filipino officials.

When the Japanese forces invaded the Philippines, and Manila fell. President Manuel Quezon together with his family and some companions escaped and stayed in Bago City from February 27 to March 18, 1942, making Bago the temporary capital of the Commonwealth of the Philippines.

Later after Quezon left, the Japanese occupation forces arrived and the civil government of Bago was dissolved. They would try to establish a provisional government but the local people refused to cooperate. When the joint American and Filipino forces including recognized guerrillas liberated the town on March 29, 1945, it was completely destroyed but rehabilitation work was immediately started.

Bago was finally granted its cityhood on February 19, 1966, by virtue of Republic Act. No. 4382 with Manuel Y. Torres as the hold-over City Mayor until 1998.

Legal limitations on the number of successive terms disqualified Mayor Manuel Y. Torres in running again as city mayor and in the 1998 local elections, his wife, Janet E. Torres run as candidate for mayor and won. Mayor Janet served Bago as city mayor for three consecutive terms.

=== 21st century ===
On July 27, 2018, the city of Bago was awarded at Gawad Kalasag 2018 City Disaster Risk Reduction and Management as 1st Placer under Component City Category.

== Geography ==
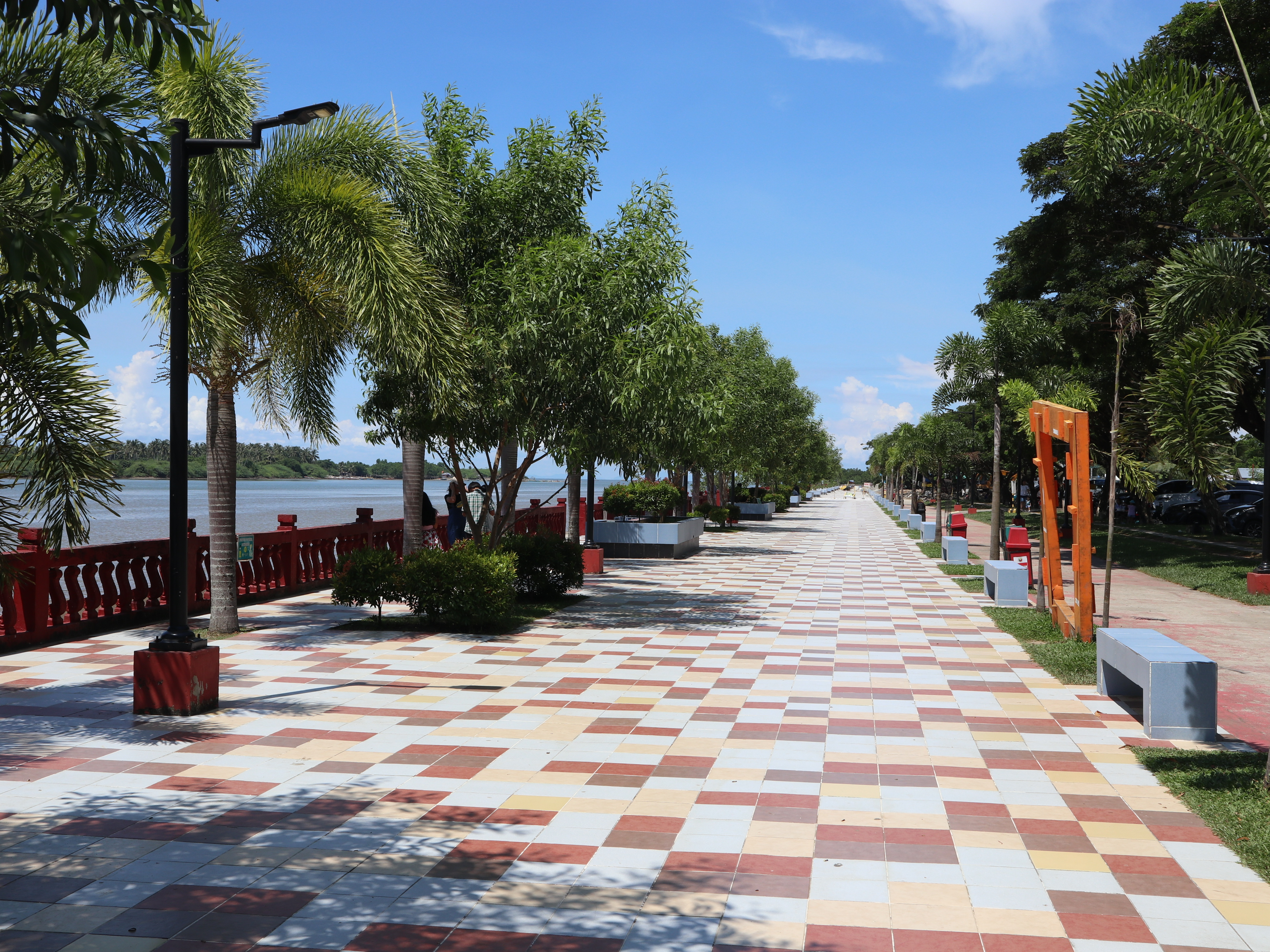
Bantayan Park in 2023

Located 22 kilometres (14 mi) south of the provincial capital Bacolod and 193 kilometres (120 mi) from Dumaguete, Bago comprises 6.63% of the population of the entire Negros Occidental, making it the third most populous city in the province. It sets a land area of 389 square kilometres, which is 5% of the entire Negros Occidental and 10% of the total land area of component cities.

Bago has a total land area of 38,941 hectares, 3,651 ha. of which belongs to Mt. Kanla-on Natural Park. It is composed of 24 barangays, 16 of which are rural and 8 are urban. Based on NSO 2000 census, urban barangays include Abuanan, Atipuluan, Caridad, Balingasag, Don Jorge Araneta, Ma-ao, Poblacion and Taloc. Barangay Ilijan, however, with a distance of 30.50 km from the city proper is the farthest barangay. Barangay Bacong has the biggest land area with 4,827.0350 hectares while Brgy Poblacion, as the smallest, has 311.5044 hectares. The city has 1,100 has-water area and 15 km coastline. Bago is traversed by the widest river in the province, the Bago River, which starts from the northeast slope of Kanlaon Volcano and drains into Guimaras Strait.

It has moderately sloping to rolling lands. Slopes are raging from 0 to 3% comprises 22.911.42 has. 3 to 8% comprises 5,783.92 has. 8 to 18% comprises 4, 682.22 has, 18.1 to 30% comprises 1,514.84 has, 30 to 50% steep hills and rolling comprises 1,735.18 has. and a very steep and mountainous 50% above comprises 2,313.57 has.

=== Barangays ===
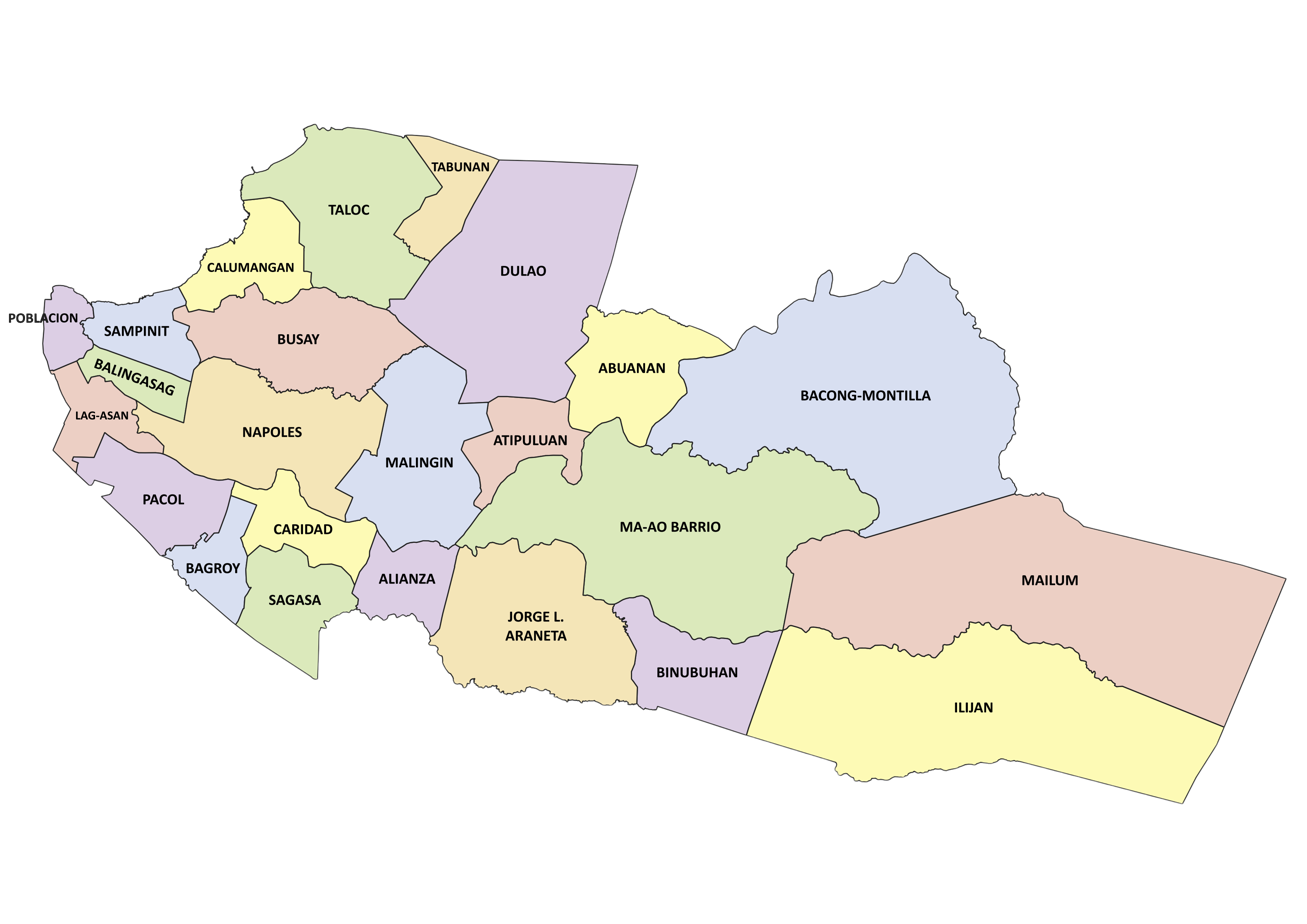
Political map of Bago

Bago is politically subdivided into 24 barangays. Each barangay consists of puroks and some have sitios.

- Abuanan
- Alianza
- Atipuluan
- Bacong-Montilla
- Bagroy
- Balingasag
- Binubuhan
- Busay
- Calumangan
- Caridad
- Don Jorge L. Araneta (Ma-ao Central)
- Dulao
- Ilijan
- Lag-asan
- Ma-ao
- Mailum
- Malingin
- Napoles
- Pacol
- Poblacion
- Sagasa
- Tabunan
- Taloc
- Sampinit

=== Climate ===
Normally, the city is wet from May to December and dry from January to April with a temperature level of 24.40 degrees Celsius. Average rainfall recorded is 5.68 mm for 89 rainy days within a year while average humidity level is at 76.17%.

Climate data for Bago, Negros Occidental
Month	Jan	Feb	Mar	Apr	May	Jun	Jul	Aug	Sep	Oct	Nov	Dec	Year
Mean daily maximum °C (°F)	28 (82)	29 (84)	30 (86)	32 (90)	32 (90)	31 (88)	30 (86)	29 (84)	29 (84)	29 (84)	29 (84)	28 (82)	30 (85)
Mean daily minimum °C (°F)	23 (73)	23 (73)	23 (73)	24 (75)	25 (77)	25 (77)	25 (77)	24 (75)	24 (75)	24 (75)	24 (75)	23 (73)	24 (75)
Average precipitation mm (inches)	57 (2.2)	37 (1.5)	41 (1.6)	42 (1.7)	98 (3.9)	155 (6.1)	187 (7.4)	162 (6.4)	179 (7.0)	188 (7.4)	114 (4.5)	78 (3.1)	1,338 (52.8)
Average rainy days	12.0	7.7	9.2	10.2	19.5	24.6	26.9	25.1	25.5	25.2	18.0	13.0	216.9
Source: Meteoblue

== Demographics ==
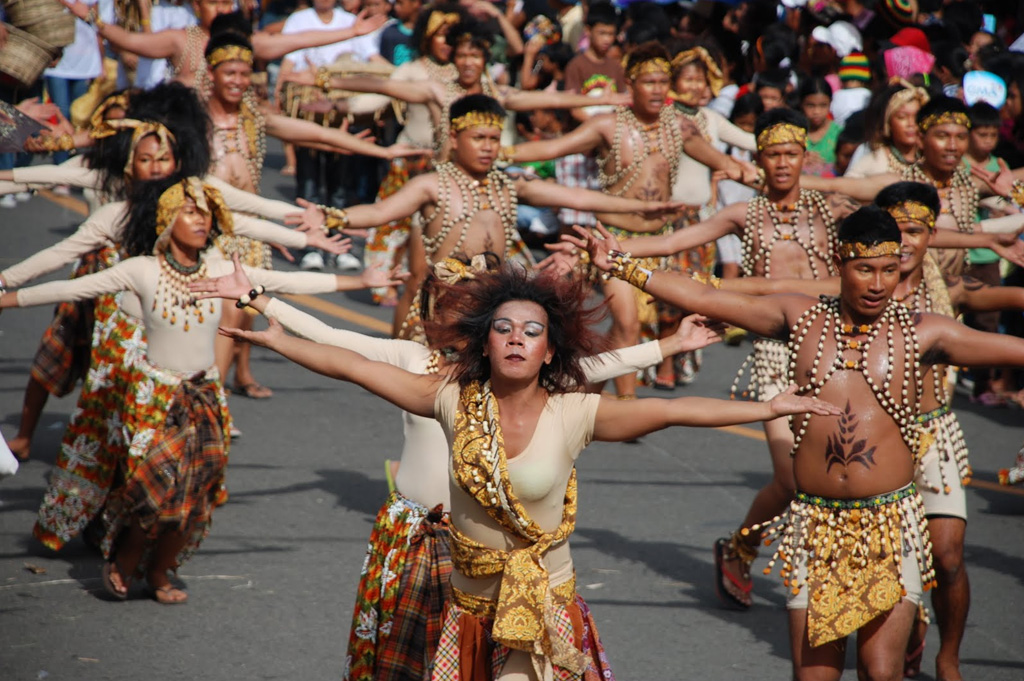
Babaylan Festival

Population census of Bago
Year	Pop.	±% p.a.
1903	23,630	—
1918	26,262	+0.71%
1939	53,874	+3.48%
1948	56,693	+0.57%
1960	58,834	+0.31%
1970	71,653	+1.99%
1975	89,213	+4.49%
1980	99,631	+2.23%
1990	122,863	+2.12%
1995	132,338	+1.40%
2000	141,721	+1.48%
2007	159,933	+1.68%
2010	163,045	+0.70%
2015	170,981	+0.91%
2020	191,210	+2.38%
2024	192,993	+0.22%
Source: Philippine Statistics Authority

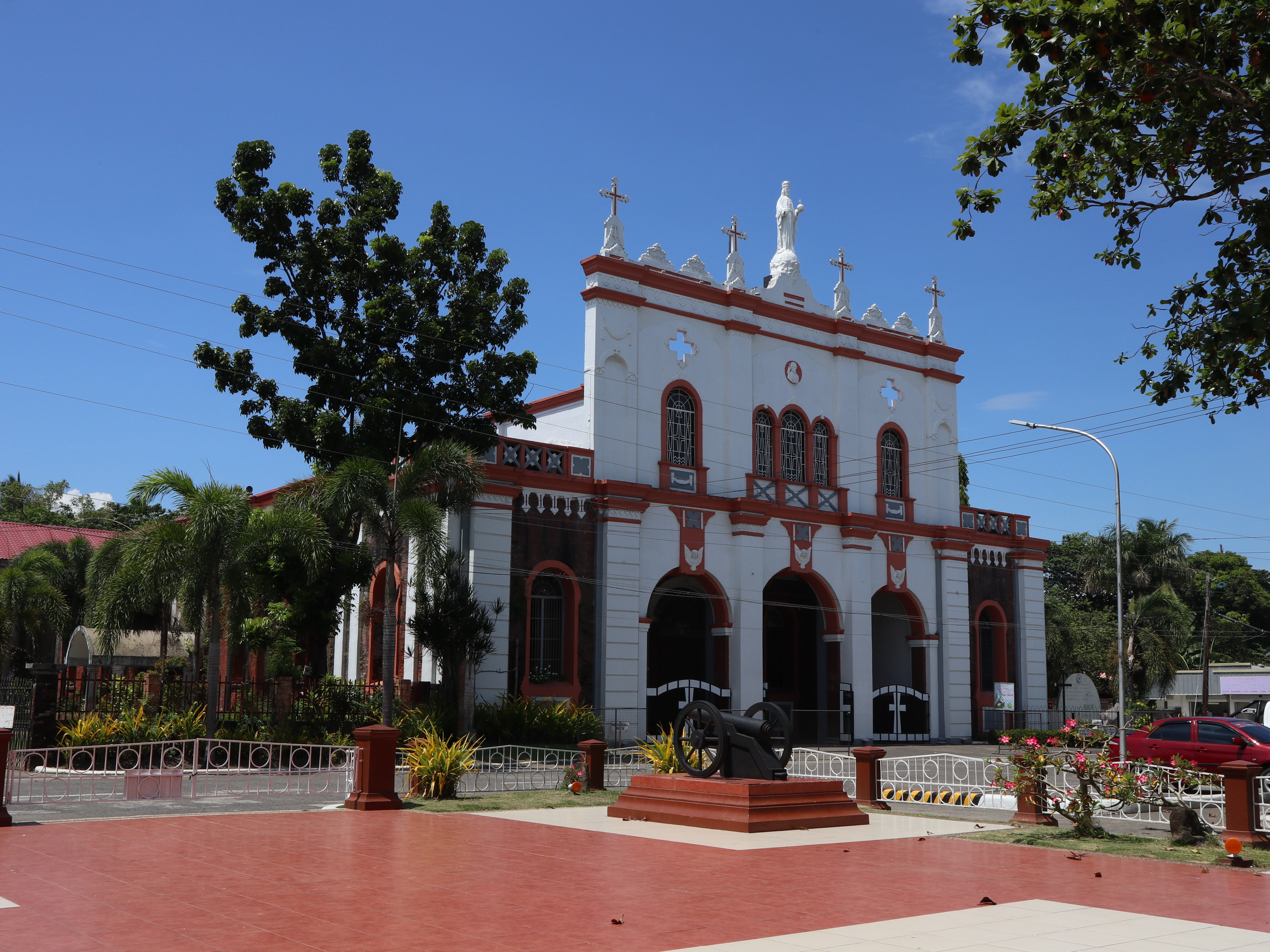
Saint John the Baptist Parish of the Roman Catholic Church

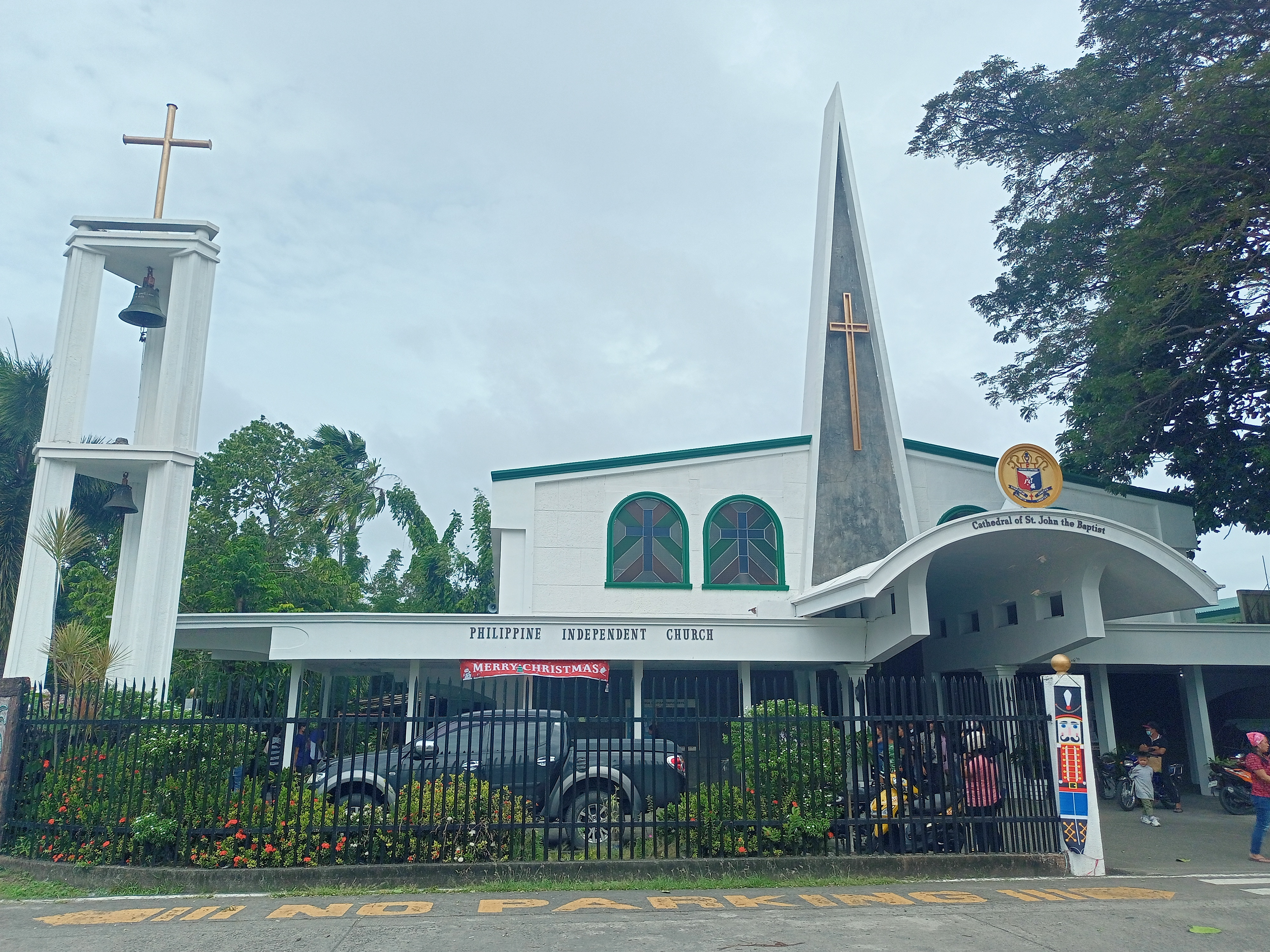
The Cathedral of St. John the Baptist of the Philippine Independent Church (Aglipayans)

=== Languages ===
99.6% of the residents speak Hiligaynon while 0.4% speak other dialects such as Kinaray-a and Cebuano.

=== Religion ===
82% are Roman Catholic, 6% are Aglipayan, 3% are Iglesia ni Cristo, 2% are Convention of Philippine Baptist Churches, and the remaining are either Jehovah's Witnesses, Church of Jesus Christ of Latter-day Saints, Seventh-day Adventists, Evangelicals, etc.

Here are some notes regarding the city's demographic information:

- Male Population is 72,777 (NSO 2000 census)
- Female Population is 86,944
- Urban Population is 60,557 (NSO census)
- Rural Population is 81,164 (NSO census)
- Barangay Ma-ao has the biggest population of 14,916
- Barangay Bagroy has the lowest population of 1,305

== Economy ==
Poverty incidence of Bago (%)

Source: Philippine Statistics Authority

== Government ==
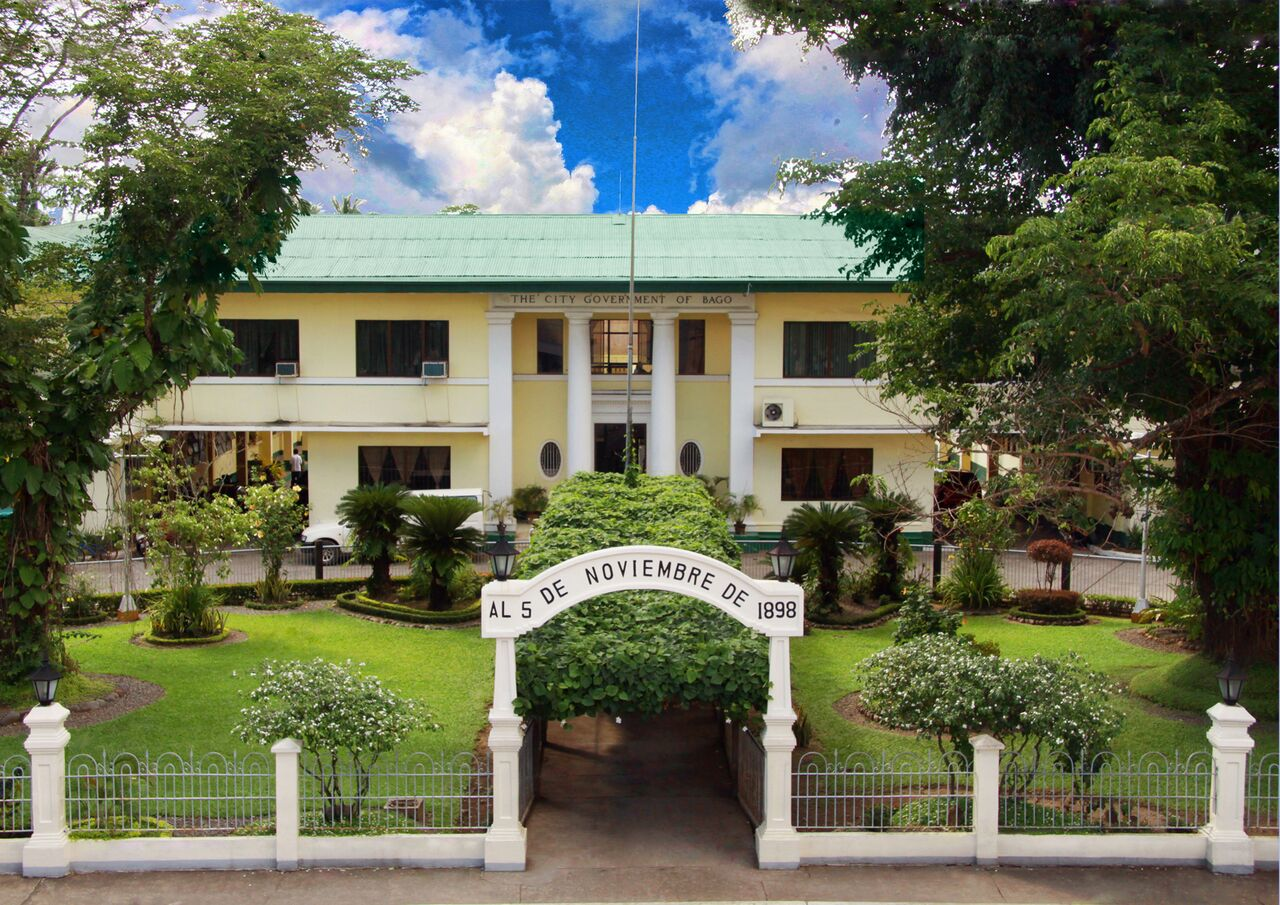
City Hall of Bago

The current Mayor is Marina Javellana-Yao with Andrew Torres serving as Vice Mayor

=== List of former chief executives ===
The following were the succeeding municipal presidents and mayors of Bago until the outbreak of the Second World War on December 7, 1941:

- Eustracio Torres
1901-1903
(elected)
- Sofronio Yulo
1904-1906
(elected)
- Mariano Villanueva
1906-1907
(appointed)
- Rufino Advincula
1907-1908
(elected)
- Mariano Villanueva
1908-1909
(appointed)
- Carlos Dreyfus
1910-1912
(elected)
- Mariano Araneta
1912-1918
(elected)
- Angel Salas
1919-1921
(elected)
- Aguedo Gonzaga, Sr.
1922-1929
(elected)
- Hilario D. Yulo
1930-1932
(elected)
- Aguedo Gonzaga, Sr.
1933-1935
(elected)
- Luis Matti
1936-1941
(elected)

The leadership since World War II:

- Basilio Lopez
1945-1946
(appointed)
- Humberto V. Javellana
1946
(appointed)
- Carlos Dreyfus
1947
(appointed)
- Jose T. Yulo
1947
(appointed)
- Luis Matti
1948-1951
(elected)
- Carlos Dreyfus
1951-1955
(elected)
- Teodoro A. Araneta
1956-1959
(elected)
- Manuel Y. Torres
1959-1986
(elected)
- Enrique J. Araneta
1986-1987
(appointed OIC Mayor)
- Roberto Matti
December 1, 1987-January 31, 1988
(appointed OIC Mayor)
- Rosemary Caunca
February 1, 1988
(appointed OIC Mayor)
- Manuel Y. Torres
February 2, 1988-1998
(elected)
- Janet E. Torres
1998-2007
(elected)
- Ramon D. Torres
2007-2016
(elected)
- Nicholas Yulo
2016-2025
(elected)
- Marina Javellana-Yao
2025-present
(elected)

== Notable personalities ==
=== Athletes ===
- Manuel Araneta Jr. - Member Philippines men’s national basketball team for the 1948 Summer Olympics
- Leopoldo Cantancio - Competitor in Boxing for the Philippines for the 1984 Summer Olympics and 1988 Summer Olympics, Silver Medalist for Boxing 1986 Asian Games
- Rogen Ladon – Boxer, Asian Games Silver Medalist, Two Time Sea Games Gold Medalist
- Aston Palicte - Professional boxer
- Eduard Sacapaño - Football Player, Goalkeeper Philippine national football team
- Larry Semillano - Competitor in Boxing for the Philippines at the 2000 Summer Olympics
- Raul Soyud - Professional basketball player
- Mansueto Velasco, Jr. - Silver Medalist for Boxing at the 1996 Summer Olympics. He and his brother Roel are the 1st and only set of siblings to win Olympic medals for the Philippines
- Roel Velasco - Bronze Medalist for Boxing at the 1992 Summer Olympics ,1st Olympic Medalist from the Visayas
- Isidro Vicera - Competed at the 1992 Summer Olympics for the men’s boxing flyweight event
- Arthur Villanueva - World Boxing Council Super Flyweight champion, International Boxing Federation Super Flyweight champion, World Boxing Organization Super Flyweight champion

=== Business Tycoons ===
- J. Amado Araneta - Business tycoon, owner and developer of Araneta Coliseum and present day Araneta City.
- Jorge L. Araneta - Chairman and CEO of The Araneta Group, ranked as the 47th richest person in the Philippines by Forbes Magazine on 2021 with a net worth of $215 million
- Roberto Benedicto -Philippine Ambassador to Japan, Chairman of the Philippine National Bank, Business Tycoon. In 1983 it was estimated that he had a net worth of $800 million or $2.5 billion equivalent amount in 2025

=== Entertainers ===
- Migo Adecer - Actor in television
- Chuckie Dreyfuss - Actor in film and television
- Vangie Labalan - Film and television actress
- Bamboo Mañalac - Musician, singer, songwriter

=== Government and Political Figures ===
- Liza Araneta Marcos - First Lady of the Philippines as the wife of Bongbong Marcos the 17th President of the Philippines
- Esteban de la Rama - Senator of the Philippines, Founder Panay Electric Company, Owner De La Rama Steamship Company, Inc.
- Sandro Marcos - Congressman, 35th Majority Floor Leader of the House of Representatives of the Philippines
- Ruperto Montinola - 4th and 8th Governor of Iloilo, Senator of the Philippines
- Sergio Osmeña III - Senator of the Philippines
- Tomas Osmeña - 24th Mayor of Cebu City, Member of the Philippine House of Representatives
- Mar Roxas - 30th Secretary of Trade and Industry (Philippines), Senator of the Philippines, 38th Secretary of Transportation and Communication, 37th Secretary of the Interior and Local Government
- Ramon Torres - 1st Secretary of Labor of the Philippines, Senator of the Philippines ,16th Governor of Negros Occidental
- Jorge B. Vargas - de facto Head of the Philippine Government (Unofficial President of the Philippines) as the Chairman of the Philippine Executive Commission ,1st Executive Secretary of the Philippines, 1st Mayor of the City of Greater Manila, Member World Scout Committee
- José Yulo -2nd Speaker of the National Assembly of the Philippines (Senate was abolished from 1935-1941, thus the Speaker is the third highest ranking official in the Philippines after the President and Vice President at this period of time),6th Chief Justice of the Philippines, 13th and 34th Secretary of Justice of the Philippines, Senator of the Philippines

=== Heroes and Historical Figures ===
- Juan Araneta - Revolutionary, National Hero, 1st Secretary of War of the Republic of Negros
- Vicente Araneta y Sta. Ana - Patriarch of the Negros Occidental branch of the Araneta family

=== International Organization Officials ===
- Rafael M. Salas - United Nations Under-Secretary General, 1st and longest serving Executive Director of the United Nations Population Fund, 16th Executive Secretary of the Philippines
- Joel Sarsiban Garcia - Chairperson of the Regional Cooperation Agreement on Combating Piracy and Armed Robbery against Ships in Asia (ReCAAP), Admiral, 28th Commandant of the Philippine Coast Guard

=== Religious ===
- Louie Galbines - 3rd Roman Catholic Bishop of the Diocese of Kabankalan, 7th Roman Catholic Bishop of the Diocese of Bacolod
- Jesus Varela - 1st Roman Catholic Bishop of Ozamis, longest serving Roman Catholic Bishop of Sorsogon, 1st Chairman of the CBCP Commission on Youth, President of the Philippine Federation of Catholic Broadcasters

=== Restaurateurs ===
- Amado Fores - Owner and founder of Steak and Frice which was selected in the Philippines’ inaugural edition of the Michelin Guide
- Margarita Fores - Celebrity Chef, restaurant chain owner, Asia's Best Female Chef 2016, her restaurant Lusso was selected in the Philippines’ inaugural edition of the Michelin Guide
