= Enrique K. Razon =

Filipino billionaire and business magnate

Enrique K. Razon Jr.
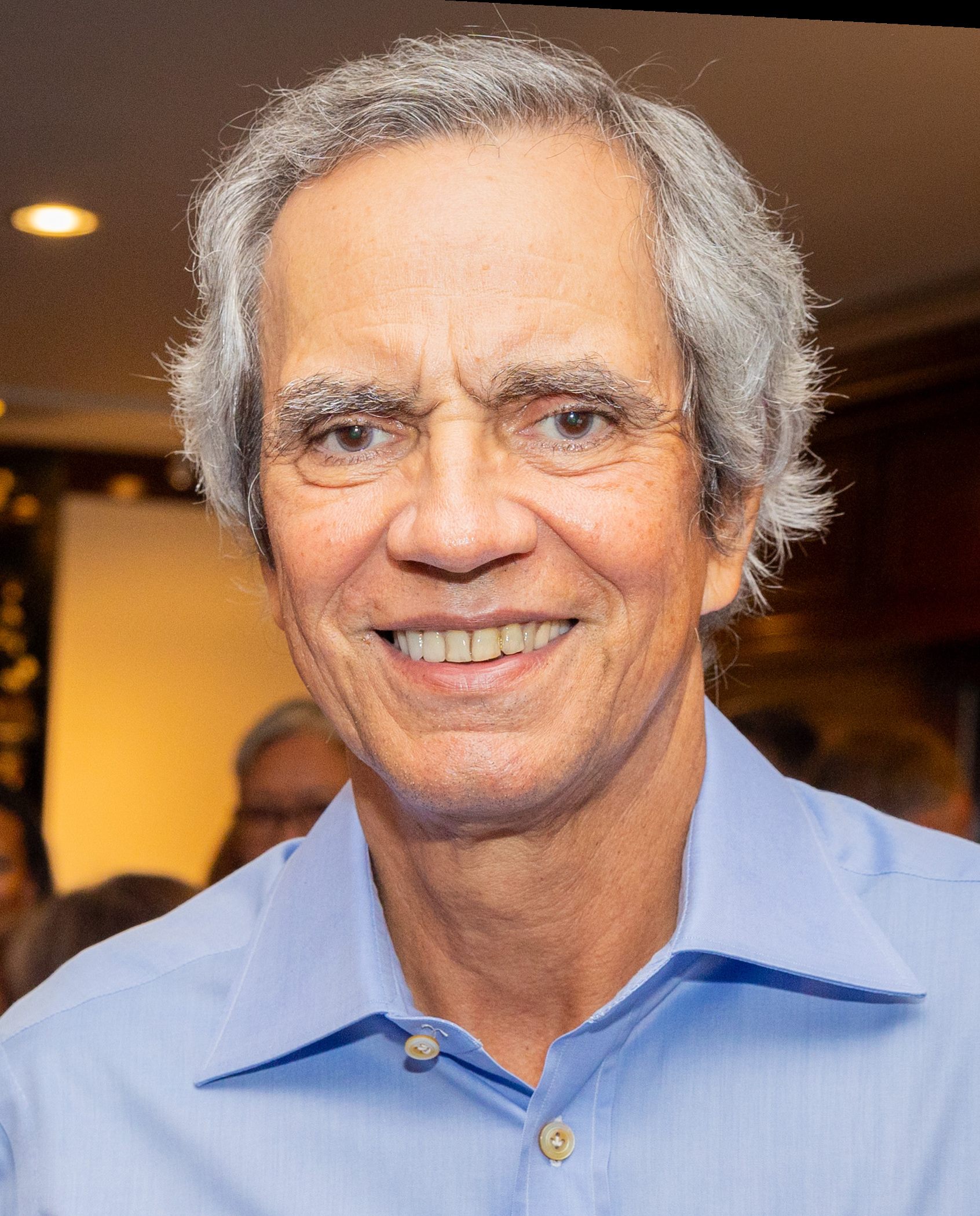
- Razon in 2023
- Born: Enrique Anselmo Klar Razon, Jr. March 3, 1960 (age 66); Manila, Philippines
- Other names: Ricky Razon; EKR; RR
- Education: De La Salle University
- Known for: International Container Terminal Services (chairman and president); Bloomberry Resorts Corporation (chairman)
- Parent: Enrique M. Razon Sr.

Enrique Anselmo Klar Razon Jr. (born March 3, 1960) is a Filipino businessman. He is chairman and CEO of the Manila-listed company International Container Terminal Services (ICTSI), a Philippine port-handling company. He is also the Chairman of Bloomberry Resorts Corporation, developer of Solaire Resort and Casino, an integrated resort complex in Metro Manila's Entertainment City, and Manila Water, the private concessionaire of Metropolitan Waterworks and Sewerage System that serves more than seven million residents of the East Zone of Metro Manila and Rizal Province. ICT, BLOOM, MWC, and APX are listed on the Philippine Stock Exchange. Razon also owns MORE Power, Iloilo City's sole power distributor since 2020.

Razon tops the list of Philippine billionaires and is ranked 175th worldwide, with a net worth of US$16.5 billion, according to Forbes.

== Biography ==
Razon was born on March 3, 1960 in Manila, Philippines. He comes from a third-generation Spanish-Filipino family involved in the marine cargo handling industry. Razon studied at La Salle Greenhills for grade school, and completed his secondary education at the La Salle Greenhills High School. He then attended Bowdoin College in the United States of America, but dropped out at the age of 17.

Razon is married to Felicia “Lizzy” Santos, a Child Protection Network board member. She is an alumna of Saint Louis University Madrid Campus and the University of the Philippines. Razon's two children are Enrique "Enzo” Razon IV, an artist and Tarzeer Pictures co-founder, and Katrina Razon, a disc jockey, music mixer, composer and KSR Ventures owner. He has a nephew named Engr. Dondon Lugnasin, an electrical engineer.

=== Private aircraft ===
In an interview with Winnie Monsod, Razon said that he acquired his first private jet two to three years ago. Razon reportedly owns three Gulfstream Aircraft: a Gulfstream G200, a Gulfstream G450, a Gulfstream G650ER, and four helicopters. He is also reportedly the first owner of an Airbus Helicopter H160 in the Philippines.

== Investments ==
Razon is most well-known as the Chairman of International Container Terminal Services. His other investments include power, mining, oil and gas exploration, and leisure facilities.

=== Bloomberry ===
Razon is chairman of Bloomberry Resorts, which runs the Solaire Resort & Casino chain in Metro Manila.

=== ICTSI ===
In 1987, the Razon Group and the Soriano Group incorporated ICTSI, initially to bid for the Manila International Container Terminal (MICT) in the Philippines. After winning the MICT contract in 1988, Razon spearheaded the MICT's development program. ICTSI operates a total of eight terminals in the Philippines.

After consolidating and strengthening its base and flagship operation at the MICT, ICTSI launched an international and domestic expansion program.

=== Prime Infra ===
Prime Infrastructure Capital, Inc. (Prime Infra; formerly Prime Strategic Holdings, Inc.) is Razon's privately-held holding company for power and water units.

==== Manila Water ====
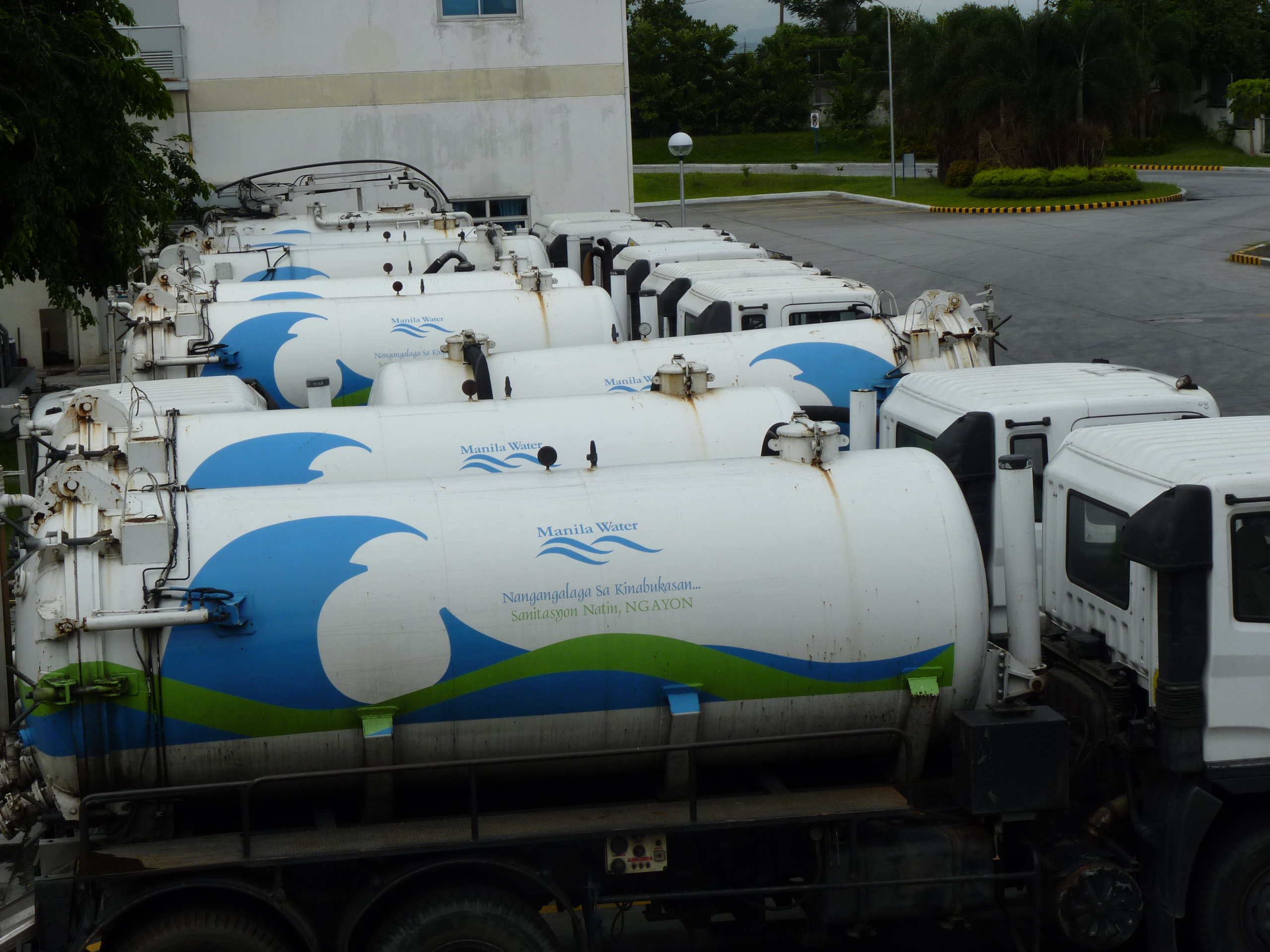
Desludging trucks of Manila Water in 2012

On December 3, 2019, leading figures Jaime Augusto Zobel de Ayala along with Manny Pangilinan of Maynilad, were threatened of arrest by then President Rodrigo Duterte due to accusations of syndicated estafa, economic sabotage, among others. This was after MWC won a tariff-related international arbitration against the government. The company's share price reached a nadir by mid-December, ending up lower than its IPO price 14 years prior. The sequence of events resulted to the eventual re-negotiation of MWC's concession contract, and within two months Ayala selling the controlling stake to Trident Water Holdings Company, Inc., a subsidiary of Prime Infrastructure Holdings Inc. of the Razon Group. Four years later in 2024, Ayala Corporation completely divested its voting stakes to said group. It however retains economic interests until 2029 through preferred shares. Some quarters say that Ayala's divestment was a fallout of Duterte's actions in 2019.

==== MORE Power ====
Enrique Razon owns MORE Power (MORE Electric and Power Corporation or Monte Oro Resources) in Iloilo that replaced Panay Electric Company (PECO) as Iloilo City's sole power distributor in 2020 through a legislative franchise.

==== SierraCol ====
In 2026, Razon, through Prime Infra, agreed to acquire SierraCol Energy Limited (SierraCol), the largest independent oil and gas company in Colombia, from the global investment firm The Carlyle Group.

=== Former investments ===
==== Manila Standard ====
The logo used from 2005 to 2015 as Manila Standard Today

In 1997, businessman Enrique K. Razon Jr., chairman and president of the International Container Terminal Services Inc., acquired the shares of the Yuchengcos and bought out the Soriano group to become the sole owner of Kamahalan Publishing Corporation and Kagitingan Printing Press Inc.

In 2010, just as the Aquino administration took the reins of power, ownership of the Manila Standard Today changed hands again. This time, the Razon group sold its interest to the Romualdez group as Razon established Bloomberry Resorts & Hotels Corporation, owner of the Solaire Resort & Casino.

== Philanthropy ==
Razon tables the ICTSI Foundation, Inc., which oversees and implements the ICTSI Group's corporate social responsibility advocacies. He has been a long-time patron of Philippine golf in the country through the Philippine Golf Tour, backed by sports management company, Pilipinas Golf Tournaments Inc. (PGTI), where he is chairman. Razon likewise extends help to the country's amateur golf development through the ICTSI-The Country Club program, supported by the ICTSI Foundation.

In 2003, Razon donated P50 million for DLSU's sports development. The P50 million pesos were broken down into P25 million for equipment and facilities of the Enrique M. Razon Sports Complex, named after his father; P20 million for athletic scholarships; and P5 million for a sports solidarity fund.
