= USAT Don Esteban =

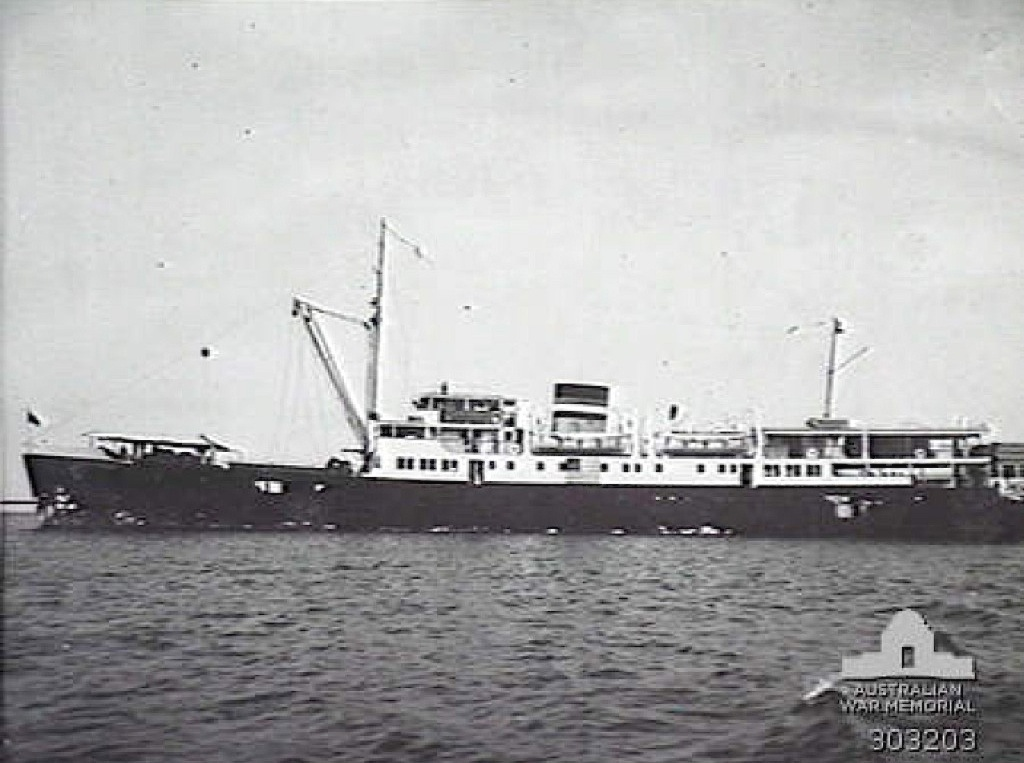
- Port side view of the American passenger motor vessel Don Esteban. Note the prominent national flag painted on her hull to indicate her neutrality.

History

Philippines
- Name: Don Esteban; USAT Don Esteban (30 October 1941)
- Owner: De La Rama Steamship Company
- Operator: De La Rama Steamship Company
- Builder: Friedrich Krupp Germaniawerft A. G., Kiel, Germany
- Launched: 1936
- Fate: Sunk off Mindoro, 2 March 1942
- Notes: Under U.S. Army bareboat charter (thus meeting criteria for U.S. Army Transport (USAT)), on 25 October 1941 and delivered for service 30 October 1941. She was lost off Mindoro 2 March 1942.

General characteristics
- Tonnage: 1,616 GRT
- Length: 267 ft (81.4 m)
- Beam: 37 ft (11.3 m)
- Height: 120 ft (36.6 m) upper bridge
- Draught: 18 ft (5.5 m)
- Propulsion: Two 8 cyl diesel
- Speed: 16 kts

Don Esteban, delivered in 1936, was the first and smaller of two Krupp built motor ships of the De La Rama Steamship Company, Iloilo, Philippines in inter-island service. The ship was under a bareboat charter by the United States Army as a transport on 30 October 1941 for use in pre positioning U.S. Army Air Corps (USAAC) fuel and munitions in the southern Philippines, Netherlands East Indies, Singapore and Australia. After the Japanese invasion of the Philippines she evacuated personnel from the Army headquarters, including General MacArthur, from Manila to Corregidor on Christmas Eve, 1941. The ship was lost off Mindoro on 2 March 1942 while continuing its supply missions.

== Construction and civilian service ==
Don Esteban was constructed 1936 at Friedrich Krupp Germaniawerft A. G., Kiel, Germany for the inter-island passenger service of the De La Rama Steamship Company in Philippine waters. She was a diesel motor ship with two eight cylinder diesel engines driving two screws for a speed of sixteen knots. Along with the newer and larger Don Isidro the ship was noted as being among the more luxurious serving inter-island passengers.

== U.S. Army transport ==
On 25 October 1941, with delivery for service 30 October 1941, the ship was bareboat chartered by the U.S. Army (Note: Ships owned by or bareboat chartered by the Army meet the generally accepted criteria for full Army control and designation as a U.S. Army Transport (USAT).) for its local Philippine fleet (Note: Major Army commands had authority to charter vessels locally, outside the global Army fleet system. The largest of these was the Southwest Pacific Area (SWPA) fleet covered in Masterson's work. On page 319 Masterson notes: "The procurement and operations of this [the Philippine] fleet make a self-contained story, unrelated to the future course of the war." No vessels of that fleet were known to have survived the occupation.) in support of a plan to establish pre-deployed fuel and munitions for use of a force of B-17 bombers being sent to reinforce the Philippines in the event of war with Japan. Dumps were planned for two mission's worth of fuel and bombs at Singapore and Darwin, Australia and one mission's supply at Rabaul and Port Moresby, both Australian controlled territories, with a depot at Rockhampton, Australia. The ship, with a capacity less than anticipated, only made initial deliveries to Rabaul and Port Moresby. The ship was returning to Manila, after orders to break from the mission due to the worsening situation in the Pacific, when news of the Attack on Pearl Harbor arrived. If already north of the Equator the ship was directed to continue to Manila, if still south of that line the ship was directed to return to Darwin. The ship was north and returned to Manila 9 December.

By 11 December the Japanese invasion was developing with commercial ships evacuating Manila Bay. By 14 December most of the U.S. Asiatic Fleet had withdrawn and all heavy bombers of the USAAC had withdrawn to Mindanao and on the 17th to Darwin. On 13 December Don Esteban departed Manila after loading bombs from USS Canopus destined for the Del Monte airfield on Mindanao. The ship returned to Manila, already under air attack, on 21 December after a stop at Iloilo to deliver small arms and ammunition. On the 22nd the ship had to evade air attack by getting under way into open waters. After successful evasion the ship was assigned to begin transporting supplies to Corregidor.

By 23 December MacArthur had decided to evacuate Manila and on Christmas Eve he, his family, and his headquarters evacuated the city aboard Don Esteban in early evening with the flames of over a million gallons of Navy fuel oil lighting the sky. The ship landed the headquarters on Corregidor at 9:30 that night. During the further evacuation of Manila the ship transported medical personnel and those patients not able to board the improvised hospital ship Mactan to field hospitals in Bataan. Don Esteban continued evacuating personnel and supplies from the now open city of Manila to Bataan and Corregidor with a final departure assisting in removing Philippine government officials and the country's reserve gold and currency. On 19 February 1942 the ship departed with a party composed of Philippine officials, including vice president, Sergio Osmeña, to safety. After making contact with a submarine, the ship went to Iloilo where the President briefly boarded until daylight when the ship departed for Cebu City to load supplies for Corrigedor. Shortly after departure the ship was attacked by Japanese aircraft and the ship was ordered abandoned by Captain Afable as the damage was severe and a cargo of gasoline was leaking. Survivors saw the ship erupt in flames after bombers returned along with Japanese surface vessels. The ship is shown in official records as being lost on 2 March 1942.

Don Esteban, along with some 25 other vessels chartered by Army to form a local Philippine support fleet supporting defense efforts shortly before the war's outbreak and to support forces on Bataan and later Corregidor, did not survive to escape to Australia. (Note: A footnote for page 319 in Masterson's U. S. Army Transportation In The Southwest Pacific Area 1941-1947 lists vessels: "The last-mentioned letter lists the following vessels of the Philippine fleet as chartered interisland transports: Bohol II, Legaspsi, Elcano, Hai Kwang, Kolambugan, Yusang, M/S Condensa, Talisay, M/V Governor Taft, S/S Lepus, M/S La Estrella Caltex, M/V Katipuman, M/V Dumaguete, USAT Regulus, M/S Princess of Cebu, M/S Kanlaon, Bacolod, M/V Princesa, M/V Emilia, S/S Cia de Filipino, S/S Luzon, M/V Surigao, M/V Governor Smith, M/V Agustina, and S/S Mayon. Crew lists and names and addresses of beneficiaries were transmitted with this letter and were filed under 231.8 for each of the named vessels.")

== References cited ==
- Astor, Gerald (1999). The Greatest War - Volume I: From Pearl Harbor to the Kasserine Pass. New York, N.Y.: Warner Books, Inc. ISBN 978-0-759-52650-1.
- Edwards, Paul M. (2010). Between the Lines of World War II: Twenty-One Remarkable People and Events. Jefferson, N.C.: McFarland & Company. ISBN 978-0-7864-4667-4.
- Funtecha, Henry, Prof. (2005). "The final trip of M.V. Don Isidro". The News Today (28 January 2005).
- Grover, David (1987). U.S. Army Ships and Watercraft of World War II. Naval Institute Press. ISBN 0-87021-766-6.)
- Heisinger, Duane (2003). Father Found. Xulon Press. ISBN 1-591604-97-4. LCCN 2003091645.
- Lloyd's Register (PDF). Lloyd's Register. 1942–1943.
- Masterson, James R. (1949). U. S. Army Transportation In The Southwest Pacific Area 1941-1947. Washington, DC: Transportation Unit, Historical Division, Special Staff, U. S. Army.
- Matloff, Maurice; Snell, Edwin M. (1999). The War Department: Strategic Planning For Coalition Warfare 1941-1942. United States Army In World War II. Washington, DC: Center Of Military History, United States Army. LCCN 53-61477.
- Morton, Lewis (1993). The War in the Pacific: The Fall Of The Philippines. United States Army In World War II. Washington, D.C.: Center Of Military History, United States Army. LCCN 53-63678.
- "The execution of Jose Abad Santos". Official Gazette of the Republic of the Philippines.
- Weiss, Edward W. "Edward W. Weiss". Brooke County Public Library Foundation-ADBC Museum, Wellsburg WV 26070. Archived from the original on 17 March 2015.
- Williford, Glen (2010). Racing the Sunrise—Reinforcing America's Pacific Outposts 1941–1942. Annapolis, Maryland: Naval Institute Press. ISBN 978-1-59114-956-9. LCCN 2010030455.
- Williams, Mary H. (1960). Chronology 1941–1945. United States Army In World War II. Washington, DC: Center Of Military History, United States Army. LCCN 59-60002.
