= MORE Electric and Power Corporation =

Electric power distribution company

- Type: Privately held wholly-owned subsidiary
- Industry: Power distributor
- Founded: 2018; 8 years ago
- Headquarters: MORE Power Corporate Center, Quezon Street, City Proper, Iloilo City, Philippines
- Key people: Roel Z. Castro, President and CEO; Stephen George Paradies, Chairman
- Owner: Enrique K. Razon
- Parent: Prime Strategic Holdings, Inc.
- Subsidiaries: Primelectric Holdings, Inc.
- Website: www.morepower.com.ph

MORE Electric and Power Corporation, also known as MORE Power, is an electric power distribution company in the Philippines. It has served Iloilo City since 2020, following its takeover of the private firm Panay Electric Company (PECO) as the city’s sole power distributor. It also serves parts of the municipality of Pavia, Iloilo.

The name "MORE" is an acronym for Monte Oro Resources & Energy, Inc., a subsidiary of Prime Strategic Holdings, Inc. (formerly known as Prime Metroline Holdings, Inc.) of the Spanish-Filipino billionaire Enrique Razon.

== History ==
MORE Power was founded in 2018 under the parent company of Prime Strategic Holdings, Inc. of Enrique K. Razon. On February 14, 2019, it was granted a 25-year power distribution franchise in Iloilo City signed by President Rodrigo Duterte, after Panay Electric Company (PECO)'s 97-year-long service franchise in the city expired earlier on January 18, 2019. On February 28, 2020, MORE Power began the takeover of PECO’s assets and officially commenced operations as the city’s new electric power distributor.

On July 30, 2022, MORE Power's proposed expanding its power distribution service in Iloilo province lapsed into law under Republic Act 11918, or the modified MORE Power franchise. The expansion of MORE Power’s service areas covered Alimodian, Leganes, Leon, New Lucena, Pavia, San Miguel, Santa Barbara, Zarraga, Anilao, Banate, Barotac Nuevo, Dingle, Dueñas, Dumangas, San Enrique, and Passi City. The service areas were previously served by Iloilo Electric Cooperatives (ILECO) I and III.

In July 2024, MORE Power invested ₱115 million to modernize its power services, including the implementation of a SCADA (supervisory control and data acquisition) system, which enables remote monitoring and control of substations, as well as data collection for analysis. It was completed and became operational in May 2026, making MORE Power the first utility company in Western Visayas to implement such a system.

In October 2024, the underground distribution system (UDS) along Calle Real, a historic street in downtown Iloilo City, became operational. The project, financed by MORE Power in collaboration with the Iloilo City government, began in 2023 and was completed in December 2024. The UDS project will also be expanded to other parts of the city, including district plazas, main roads, and other heritage sites.

In January 2026, MORE Power began expanding its service to parts of Pavia.

== Controversies ==
=== Franchise dispute with PECO ===
In February 2019 when President Duterte signed Republic Act 11212, MORE Power was granted a 25-year franchise to take over from PECO, whose own franchise had expired just weeks earlier in January 2019 after failing to secure an extension from Congress. Following this legislative move, MORE Power swiftly initiated an expropriation case against PECO in March 2019 to legally acquire its distribution assets necessary for operating in Iloilo City. Despite PECO's objections, the Iloilo City Regional Trial Court, under Judge Emerald Requina-Contreras, issued a crucial writ of possession, allowing MORE Power to take over specified PECO assets. This court order paved the way for MORE Power to assume operational control over key infrastructure like substations, reassuring residents and businesses of uninterrupted service through proactive consumer support measures. However, PECO has continued to challenge the legality of Republic Act 11212 and the court's decisions, maintaining a legal and regulatory standoff that underscores the complexities and stakes involved in the transition of electricity distribution services in Iloilo City.

In 2020, the Supreme Court issued a final ruling that PECO could no longer operate Iloilo City’s distribution system, affirming that its franchise had lapsed. MORE Power was thereby established as the new distributor of power in Iloilo City.

=== Franchise expansion conflict ===
In 2024, the Supreme Court upheld MORE Power's expansion franchise covering 15 municipalities and one city previously within ILECOs' jurisdiction. The landmark decision entitled "Iloilo Electric Cooperative, Inc. [ILECO I], et al. v. Executive Secretary Lucas P. Bersamin, et al.", G.R. No. 264260, dated July 30, penned by Justice Rodil Zalameda, dismissed the certiorari filed by Iloilo Electric Cooperative, Inc. I, II, and III which contested the validity of Section 1, R.A. 11918. It ruled that Section 11, Article XII of the 1987 Constitution prohibits exclusive franchises. In January 2025, the petition was dismissed by the Supreme Court and upholds MORE Power's franchise expansion in the 15 municipalities in Iloilo province.

== Service area ==
MORE Power serves Iloilo City as the sole electricity distributor and also supplies parts of Pavia. The expansion will also extend further into the province of Iloilo, covering Alimodian, Leganes, Leon, New Lucena, San Miguel, Santa Barbara, Zarraga, Anilao, Banate, Barotac Nuevo, Dingle, Dueñas, Dumangas, San Enrique, and Passi City. These areas were previously served by Iloilo Electric Cooperatives (ILECO) I and III. According to MORE Power, the expansion is expected to take four to five years to complete and will account for 50% of the total population of Iloilo City and the province combined.

Municipalities in the southwestern part of Iloilo, including Tigbauan, San Joaquin, Guimbal, Miag-ao, Oton, Igbaras, and Tubungan, also show strong public support for the potential expansion of MORE Power’s services in their areas.
