= Don Isidro =

Motor ship of the Philippines used by US Army, bombed and wrecked in 1942 (WW2)

Coordinates: 11°42.3′S 130°02′E

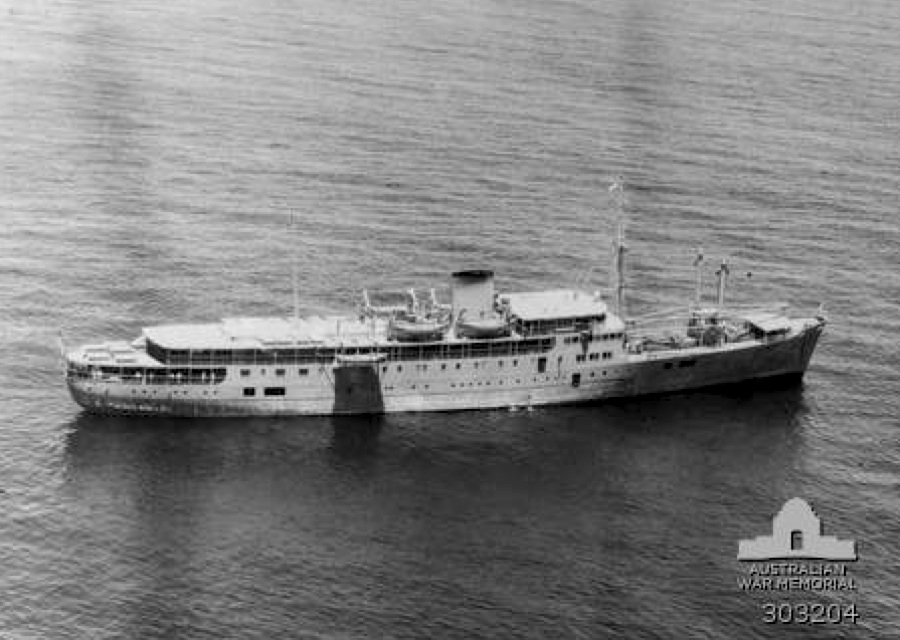
- Don Isidro 24 December 1941 (Australian War Memorial, Naval Historical Collection)

History

Philippines
- Name: Don Isidro
- Owner: De La Rama Steamship Company
- Operator: De La Rama Steamship Company
- Builder: Friedrich Krupp Germaniawerft A. G., Kiel, Germany
- Launched: 1939
- Fate: Attacked by Japanese aircraft en route to bomb Darwin on 19 February 1942, beached burning, lost.
- Notes: Under U.S. Army time/voyage charter December 1941 until loss 19 February 1942.

General characteristics
- Tonnage: 3,261 GRT
- Length: 320.9 ft (97.8 m)
- Beam: 46 ft (14 m)
- Height: 177 ft (54 m) upper bridge
- Draught: 20 ft (6.1 m)
- Propulsion: Two 9 cyl turbocharged diesel
- Speed: 20 kts
- Capacity: 408 passengers

Don Isidro, delivered in 1939, was the second and larger of two Krupp built motor ships of De La Rama Steamship Company, Iloilo, Philippines in inter-island service. The ship was under charter by the United States Army as a transport during the Japanese invasion of the Philippines. As defending forces became cut off from supply by the Japanese blockade Don Isidro was one of eight ships, only three of which were successful, known to make an attempt to run the blockade. In that attempt, under her captain Rafael J. Cisneros, Don Isidro became involved in the 19 February Japanese attack on Darwin, Australia where, though not in the port, she was strafed, bombed and left off Bathurst Island burning with all lifeboats destroyed. Of the 67 crew and 16 soldiers aboard, 11 of the crew and one soldier were killed or missing. Survivors were rescued by HMAS Warrnambool, taken to Darwin, treated at the hospital and then awaited orders at the 147th Field Artillery camp. The wreck still lies in shallow water off the western coast of Bathurst Island, Tiwi Islands.

== Before the war ==
Don Isidro was constructed 1939 at Friedrich Krupp Germaniawerft A. G., Kiel, Germany for the inter-island passenger service of the De La Rama Steamship Company in Philippine waters. She was a diesel motor ship with two nine cylinder turbocharged engines driving two screws for a speed of twenty knots. She was the second and larger of two motor ships built by Krupp for the De La Rama Steamship Company based in Iloilo in the Philippines, both used for inter-island service.

The day after Great Britain and France declared war on Germany, Don Isidro was the subject of an incident at Port Said on 5 September 1939, as she cleared the Suez Canal on her maiden voyage from Kiel to Manila. British authorities removed two German engineers sailing with the vessel to provide training and technical support from the ship, provoking a diplomatic protest from the United States "as illegal and a violation of the neutral rights of the United States" on the day after President Roosevelt proclaimed that neutrality. The British explanation was unsatisfactory to the Department of State but was considered closed "on the assumption that similar instances will not be permitted to occur in the future".

Over the next 26 months Don Isidro, along with the smaller and slightly older Don Esteban were noted as the luxury vessels of inter-island passenger service. Then that war caught up again with the 7 December 1941 (Hawaii time) Japanese attack on Pearl Harbor and the Philippines only hours later on 8 December (Philippine time). (Note: The time correlations can be seen in this quote from Morton's Fall of the Philippines on page 79: "The duty officer at Asiatic Fleet headquarters in the Marsman Building in Manila on the night of 7–8 December (Philippine time) was Lt. Col. William T. Clement, USMC. At 0230 of the 8th (0800, 7 December, Pearl Harbor time), the operator at the Navy station intercepted the startling message, 'Air Raid on Pearl Harbor. This is no drill.'".)

== Wartime operations ==
The ship was under charter by the United States Army as a transport during the Japanese invasion of the Philippines. As defending forces became cut off from supply by the Japanese blockade, Don Isidro was one of eight ships, only three of which were successful, known to make an attempt to run the blockade.

Whatever the movements of Don Isidro between Manila being evacuated and being declared an open city on 23 and 26 December 1941 respectively, the ship had come under the War Shipping Administration, allocated to U.S. Army charter on 11 January 1942 at Fremantle, and was in Brisbane, Australia being loaded with rations and ammunition on 22 January 1942 when defenders were ordered to withdraw from the Abucay-Mauban line to final defense lines in Bataan. She left Brisbane on a "special mission" at 1.45 p.m., 27 January 1942 "bound for Corregidor" seeking to supply forces still on Bataan.

The ship's location in Brisbane was no coincidence. Supplies and ships were being sent to the Netherlands East Indies from Brisbane as the Malay Barrier concept was still alive and the port had been the first stop for a number of ships diverted to Australia with the invasion of the Philippines. Significant supplies, particularly munitions, were already there or on the way from there to Java which was closest to the besieged forces in the Philippines and small, fast blockade running vessels were presumed to be readily available there. Even the prototype seaplane, the Navy's XPBS-1, had been sent to Australia and onward to Java with critical aircraft parts and a rush order of torpedo exploders from San Diego—and on departure from Pearl 30 January General Patrick Hurley with a bag of cash to add to that dispatched already for procurement locally of vital supplies. Ships of the Pensacola convoy and SS President Polk had been diverted first to Brisbane and then with supplies and munitions intended for the forces in the Philippines to Java. Polk had arrived there 12 January 1942 with 55 P-40E and 4 C-53 aircraft including 55 pilots, 20 million .30 caliber, 447,000 .50 caliber, 30,000 three inch AA and 5,000 75 mm rounds of ammunition along with five carloads of torpedoes, over 615,000 pounds of rations and 178 officers and men in addition to the pilots and herself was heading to Java when Don Isidro was loading and departing for the same destination.

At Brisbane Don Isidro was provided defence in the form of a detachment from the 453d Ordnance (Aviation) Bombardment Company of fifteen men under Second Lieutenant Joseph F. Kane, winner of the command by a coin toss. That unit had been embarked aboard the naval transport USS Republic (AP-33) in the Pensacola convoy. The soldiers armed the ship with five .50-caliber heavy machine guns on improvised mounts.

Captain Cisneros, even as Coast Farmer was readying to leave Brisbane on the same mission, took the ship south around Australia to Fremantle on the west coast for engine repairs, fuel and water before setting out for Batavia for instructions on the run to Corregidor. Science fiction author L. Ron Hubbard, then Lieutenant in the US Navy, was disciplined for his role in routing the Don Isidro around the south of Australia, "three thousand miles out of her way". Arriving there on 9 February 1942 the entire plan was unraveling as Japanese forces took Tengah airfield and made an additional landing on the island of Singapore as well as beginning movements toward Sumatra. Meeting U.S. Navy representatives 10 February, as the situation in Singapore worsened and Japanese were conquering Borneo and the Celebes, the plan was changed, with Don Isidro joining a British escorted convoy later that day in passage through Sunda Strait to the Indian Ocean. There the ship separated from the convoy on the 13th and attempted a run south of Java, through the Timor Sea then through the Torres Straits and finally through the Dampier Strait east of New Guinea for the run through the Bismarck Sea and Pacific to the Philippines.

As the ship was making that attempt the Japanese began landing on Sumatra 14 February, Singapore surrendered on the 15th, evacuation of forces from Sumatra to Java was completed, Bali was taken and Java was isolated on the 17th. Of note for Don Isidro's fate, the Allied convoy headed to Timor escorted by the USS Houston (CA-30) is recalled to Darwin on the 18th.

The run for the Torres Strait was going without incident until an unknown destroyer and freighter were spotted on the 17th headed in the opposite direction and then on 18 February Don Isidro was attacked twice by a Japanese bomber, though without damage. That attack was decisive in the captain's decision to turn toward the friendly port of Darwin. On the morning of the 19th seven Japanese fighters strafed the ship while she was about 25 mi (40 km) miles north of Bathurst Island, one of the Tiwi Islands. This attack holed the ship, destroyed all lifeboats and rafts and wounded a number of crew and the army defense detachment. In the early afternoon, at about 1:30 (1330) the ship was again attacked by a single bomber and again escaped bomb damage.

=== Loss ===
Japanese planes returning to their carriers from the Darwin strike, where ships of the Timor convoy were then located, spotted Don Isidro, with nine dive bombers, refueled and rearmed from Sōryū and Hiryū, returning with 250 kg (550 lb) for the final attack on the ship.

The result was that shortly after the ineffective single bomber's attack the ship, with no lifeboats or rafts as a result of the earlier fighter attack, was hit, heavily damaged and set in flames. The captain attempted to beach her but was unsuccessful in reaching Bathurst Island as the engines failed with the ship about three miles offshore. The attacks continued and survivors jumped overboard in an attempt to swim to the island, a process that took about ten hours. Those that reached the island arrived in scattered groups, assembled and began searching for others. They found four dead and established that many were missing. In the mid-morning of 20 February H.M.A.S. Warrnambool, having rescued some of the missing crew, picked up the main body of survivors. Warrnambool, with survivors aboard, approached the still burning Don Isidro searching for the missing Chief Engineer and Chief Electrician who were reported to be still aboard and badly burnt and wounded. The ship's deck was already under water and no survivors were found. The survivors aboard Warrnambool reached Darwin about midnight where they were treated overnight at a hospital. Then they were billeted at the camp of the 147th Field Artillery awaiting orders.

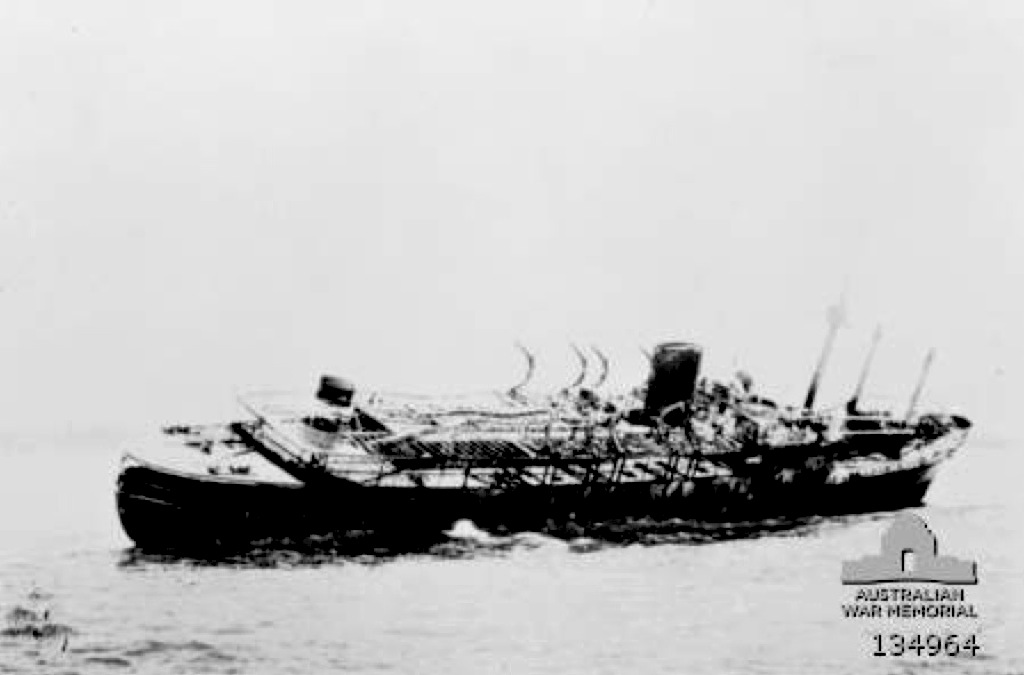
Don Isidro beached and abandoned aground near Bathurst Island

Eleven of the 67 crew had been killed and many wounded.

The killed or missing crew members were:

- Marino (Maximo?) Mangan – chief Engineer
- Loreto Jaime (Jayne?) – 2nd Engineer
- Mechor Jaruvilla (Melchor Jarobilla?) – 3rd Engineer
- Antonio Reynes – Extra engineer
- Federico Montralegra – Chief Electrician
- Raul Delagado – Machinist
- Antonio Cordova – Oiler
- Quirino Sabando – Oiler
- Alberto Jimena (Jamenen?)- Oiler
- Agapito Masangkay (Acapito Masankay?) – Pantryman
- Amado Logno (Longo?)

Eight of the men of the defense detachment were wounded, some severely, and the detachment's commander, Second Lieutenant Kane, died of gangrene in hospital at Darwin. He, posthumously, and the fifteen enlisted men of the detachment received Purple Hearts. A footnote in the Ordinance history pertaining to the detachment reads:

(1) History of Ord Sec, USASOS, 23 Dec 41- 2 Sep 42. (2) Rad, Melbourne to AGWAR, No. 311, 22 Feb 42, AG 381 (11-27-41) Sec 2C.. (3) Rpt of Ord Activities, USAFIA, Feb–May 42, OHF. (4) Official History of Headquarters USASOS, December 1941 – June 1945 (hereafter cited as History USASOS), pp. 92–93, and chs. Viii-xi. (5) Lieutenant Kane received the Purple Heart posthumously. All of the enlisted men of the 453d Ordnance (Aviation) Bombardment Company aboard the Don Isidro also received the Purple Heart for manning their guns until they were put out of action, for extinguishing fires caused by the bomb explosions, and for helping the wounded (some despite their own wounds). GO 28, USASOS SWPA, 11 Oct 42, 98-GHQ 1-1.13. These men were among the last to receive the Purple Heart “for a singularly meritorious act of essential service,” according to AR 600-45 of 8 August 1932. Change 4 to AR 600-45, 4 September 1942, restricted the award to those wounded in action against the enemy or as a direct result of enemy action.

=== Context in attempts to relieve the Philippines ===
Don Isidro was one of eight Army ships known to make the attempt to run the Japanese blockade of the Philippines from Australia or the Netherlands East Indies during the largely failed attempt to supply forces on Bataan and Corrigedor. There were small blockade runners internal to the islands, a few that made the run into those besieged locations with success. Only three of the attempts from outside the islands were successful, one being Don Isidro's De La Rama sister Dona Nati. The others were Coast Farmer, making Anakan in northern Mindanao 17 February, and the Chinese ship Anhui that made Cebu City in march. The Navy managed to make some deliveries and evacuations by submarine.

== Wreck ==
The wreck of Don Isidro lies in shallow water off Rinamatta Beach, on the west coast of Bathurst Island, half way between Cape Fourcroy and Cape Helvetius.

The remains of the Don Isidro are protected under the Commonwealth Historic Shipwrecks Act 1976. Two relics are in the Museum and Art Gallery of the Northern Territory. One is presumed to be a silver salt dish and the other a platter.
