= Melecio Figueroa =

Filipino sculptor and engraver

Member of the Malolos Congress from Iloilo
- In office September 18, 1898 – November 13, 1899 Serving with Esteban de la Rama, Venancio Concepción, and Tiburcio Hilario

Personal details
- Born: May 24, 1842 Arevalo, Iloilo, Captaincy General of the Philippines
- Died: July 30, 1903 (aged 61) Manila, Insular Government of the Philippine Islands
- Resting place: Paco, Manila, Philippines
- Spouse: Enriqueta Romero (m. 1888)
- Children: 4
- Education: Escuela de Artes y Officios; Real Academia de Bellas Artes de San Fernando

Melecio Figueroa (Tagalog pronunciation: [fɪɡɛˈɾoʊa]) (1842-1903) was a Filipino sculptor and engraver whose design of the Great Seal of the Philippines was featured in a previous coin series of the Philippine peso.

== Early life and education ==
Melecio Figueroa Magbanua was born on May 24, 1842, in Arevalo, Iloilo, to Gabriela Magbanua and Rufo Figueroa. At an early age, his mother Gabriela died, and both he and his sister were sent to relatives in Sorsogon, who were cake vendors. As a child, he carved wooden boats and dolls which he gave away to his friends.

At the age of 16, he was selected by the Ayuntamiento de Manila as one of two Filipino artists to be sent to Spain on a scholarship sponsored by Francisco Ahujas, a consul based in the Philippines.

He arrived to Madrid in 1866, where he enrolled at the Escuela de Artes y Officios, later transferring to the Real Academia de Bellas Artes de San Fernando. When his benefactor Ahujas died, Figueroa repaired watches as his source of income. While studying in Spain, he won various prizes and recognitions for his engravings.

== Career ==
In 1892, he returned to the Philippines with his family to teach engraving as a professor at the Escuela de Dibujo, Pintura y Grabado (later the University of the Philippines College of Fine Arts) in Manila. He was appointed in 1893 as engraver to the Casa Moneda or colonial mint. Figueroa also continued to repair watches as a side business and opened a silversmith shop in Manila. He also attended the Malolos Congress as a delegate, and taught at the Liceo de Manila until his death in 1903.

=== Works ===
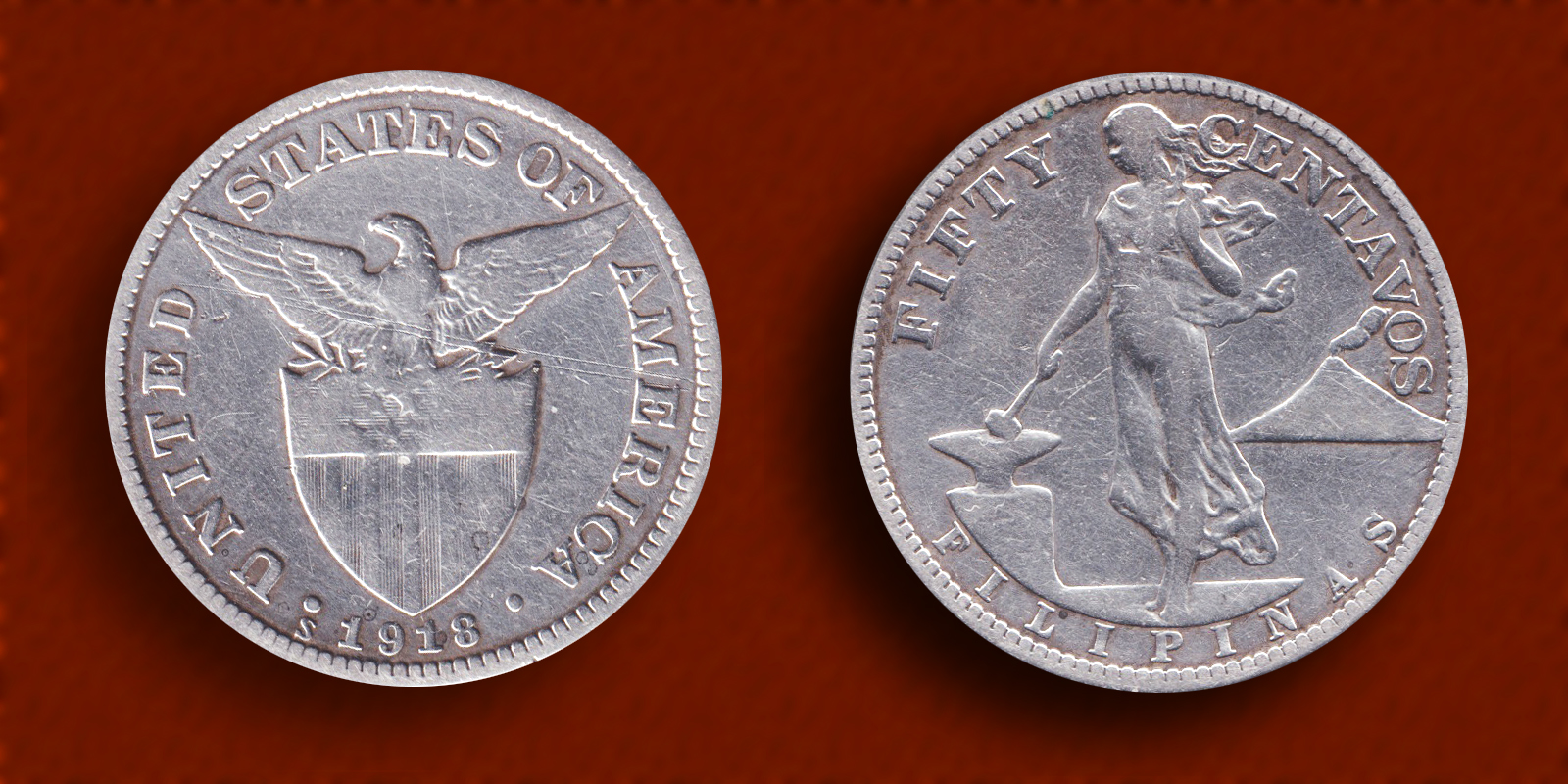
50 centavo coin (1918) which features Figueroa's design (right). The figure of Filipinas is modelled after his daughter, Blanca.

At the 1875 Exposición de Bellas Artes, Figueroa sculpted a bust of King Alfonso XII. His work was recognized and he was given a pension. While in Rome, he created a bust of the then-Prince Odescalchi. At the Exposición de Filipinas in 1887 held in Madrid, he served as a judge and also designed the medals awarded at the event. In 1903, he joined a competition for the Philippine peso coinage system, and his design was selected as the winner. The coinage system was known as the Conant Series, after financial expert Charles Arthur Conant. Figueroa's designs featured in Philippine peso coins until the 1960s.

Figueroa's design was later adopted as the Great Seal of the United States-administered Insular Government of the Philippine Islands, and saw use after his death from 1903 to 1935.

== Personal life and death ==
While in Madrid, Figueroa married Enriqueta Romero in 1888. They had four children, three of whom were born in Spain but died early. His surviving child, Blanca, was born in 1892 while they were en route by ship to the Philippines. She served as a model for some of her father's coinage designs, and (imagined as an adult) the personification of “Filipinas” on the Great Seal.

Figueroa died of tuberculosis on July 30, 1903, and was buried in Paco, Manila.
