= Esteban de la Rama =

Filipino politician and businessman

Esteban dela Rama
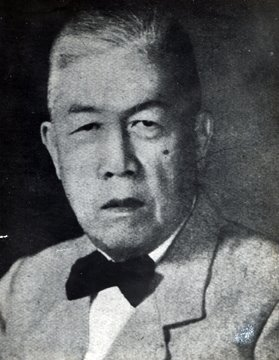

Senator of the Philippines
- In office July 5, 1945 – May 25, 1946

Member of the Malolos Congress from Iloilo
- In office September 18, 1898 – November 13, 1899 Serving with Venancio Concepción, Melecio Figueroa, and Tiburcio Hilario

Personal details
- Born: December 26, 1866 Molo, Iloilo, Captaincy General of the Philippines
- Died: November 30, 1947 (aged 80) Bago, Negros Occidental, Philippines
- Party: Nacionalista (1941–1947)

Esteban Militante de la Rama (December 26, 1866 – November 30, 1947) (alternative spelling: Esteban dela Rama) was a Filipino general during the Philippine Revolution, entrepreneur and a politician, who became a member of the Philippine Senate from 1941 to 1947 as a Nacionalista.

He founded Panay Electric Company (PECO), one of the oldest electric power distribution companies in the Philippines and the former sole power distributor of Iloilo City.

== Early life ==
De la Rama was born in Molo, Iloilo. He was the son of Isidro de la Rama, a large landowner of sugar cane plantations, who served as one of the vice mayors of Iloilo in 1890, which was granted city rights on January 31, 1890, by the then Minister of Colonies of Spain, Manuel Becerra. He himself completed his schooling in the Philippines and abroad. After his father died on June 10, 1897, he took over his shipping company.

== Revolutionary career ==
During the Philippine Revolution of 1896-1898 he served as a general in the revolutionary army. He was temporarily vice president of the veterans' organization Los Veteranos de la Revolución and held the rank of Major General and Commander of the 6th Division of the Philippine Islands National Volunteers.

On September 15, 1898, de la Rama became one of the delegates for Iloilo at the Malolos Congress, at which the Malolos Constitution of the First Philippine Republic was adopted. Along with Apolinario Mabini and Pedro Paterno, he was one of the co-signers of the Malolos Constitution in Barasoain Church on January 20, 1899.

In 1904, de la Rama ran for governor of the province of Negros Occidental, but was defeated by Antonio Ledesma Jayme.

== Entrepreneur ==
He later became CEO of the family business Hijos de I. de la Rama and, among other things, represented the demand of the Negros sugar producers for a reduction in tariffs during a visit by the US Secretary of War and former Governor-General William Howard Taft to the Philippines in August 1905. He explained that because of the high costs of labor and the outdated equipment of the sugar mills, even if the tariffs were reduced, the US market would not be flooded with Philippine sugar. In fact, the sugar cane plantation owners of Negros and Central Luzon, led by de la Rama and Jorge Araneta, managed to reach an agreement with the then US Governor General James Francis Smith for a reduction in import duties in 1909 and finally in 1913 during the tenure of Taft as US president unrestricted access to the US market. Over the next few years, the share of native Filipino sugar producers such as de la Rama, Miguel Ossorio, and Julio Javellana grew, although their share of exported sugar, at 6.8 percent in 1919, lagged far behind the shares of foreign plantation owners.

Later, de la Rama expanded his entrepreneurial activities and became one of the most influential businessmen in the Visayas. During the 5th Philippine Legislature from 1919 to 1922, he was granted permission on February 22, 1921, by Laws 2983 and 3035 for a period of 50 years to construct electricity and power plants and the associated infrastructure in what is now Iloilo City to install, expand and operate municipalities of Jaro, La Paz and Arevalo. In 1923 he founded the Panay Electric Company (PECO). In addition, in 1924 he was the founder of the first Chamber of Commerce of the Philippines in Iloilo City.

His De la Rama Central group of companies also included the De La Rama Steamship Company, Inc. in Iloilo, which had the ferry rights between Iloilo and Negros since its founding in 1931. The De la Rama Steamship Company had the two ships Don Esteban and Don Isidro built by the Friedrich Krupp Germania shipyard in Kiel in 1939, which were used during the Second World War in the Pacific Theater as a troop transport for the US armed forces.

== Senator of the Philippines ==
After the reintroduction of a bicameral legislature was implemented in 1941, de la Rama, who was dubbed the "Grand Old Man of the South" by then President Manuel Quezon, as elected in the Senate elections on November 11, 1941 as a candidate of the Nacionalista Party. However, he and other Senators were not able to take office due to the invasion and occupation of the Philippines by the Japanese the following month.

The first Senate session took place after the liberation of the Philippines on July 5, 1945. Only 14 more of the 24 members of the Senate took part in this first meeting, since the other members were either deceased or accused of collaborating with the Japanese occupying power. An election period of two, four and six years for the first senators after the end of the war, originally planned for September 1945, was abandoned. Rather, the tenure of eight senators Alauya Alonto, Pedro Hernaez, Domingo Imperial, Vicente Madrigal, Vicente Rama, Eulogio A. Rodriguez Sr., Proceso Sebastián and Emiliano Tria Tirona were extended by drawing lots until November 1947, while the remaining 16 senators were elected in the elections of April 23, 1946 for six and three-year terms respectively. He was a formal member of the Senate from January 1, 1942, to May 22, 1947.

== Personal life ==
De la Rama was married twice, his first marriage was to Agueda Benedicto in July 1891. This ended in a case on December 9, 1913, before the Supreme Court of the Philippines and before the Supreme Court of the United States for divorce, adultery and spousal maintenance claims.

His second marriage to Natividad "Doña Nati" Aguilar produced Lourdes de la Rama (1913-2011), who later married Sergio "Serging" Osmeña, Jr., who later became a Senator and governor of Cebu, and was a son of the President Sergio Osmeña. Serging Osmeña also became President of the De La Rama Steamship Company in 1948. Two of the five children of Lourdes de la Rama and Sergio Osmeña, Jr. are also politically active, namely Sergio Osmeña III, who was a senator from 1995 to 2007 and from 2010 to 2016, as well as Tomas Osmeña, who served as Mayor of Cebu City from 1988 to 1995, 2001 to 2010 and 2016 to 2019, and then served as a member of the House of Representatives from 2010 to 2013. Another daughter of Esteban de la Rama, Estefania de la Rama, was married to Enrico Pirovano, who also ran the De la Rama Steamship Company as president. Another daughter, Amparo de la Rama, was the first wife of the politician Fausto Felix S. Gonzalez, who was a member of the Commonwealth National Assembly between 1938 and 1941 and represented the province of Pampanga's 2nd district.
