= Dona Nati (1939) =

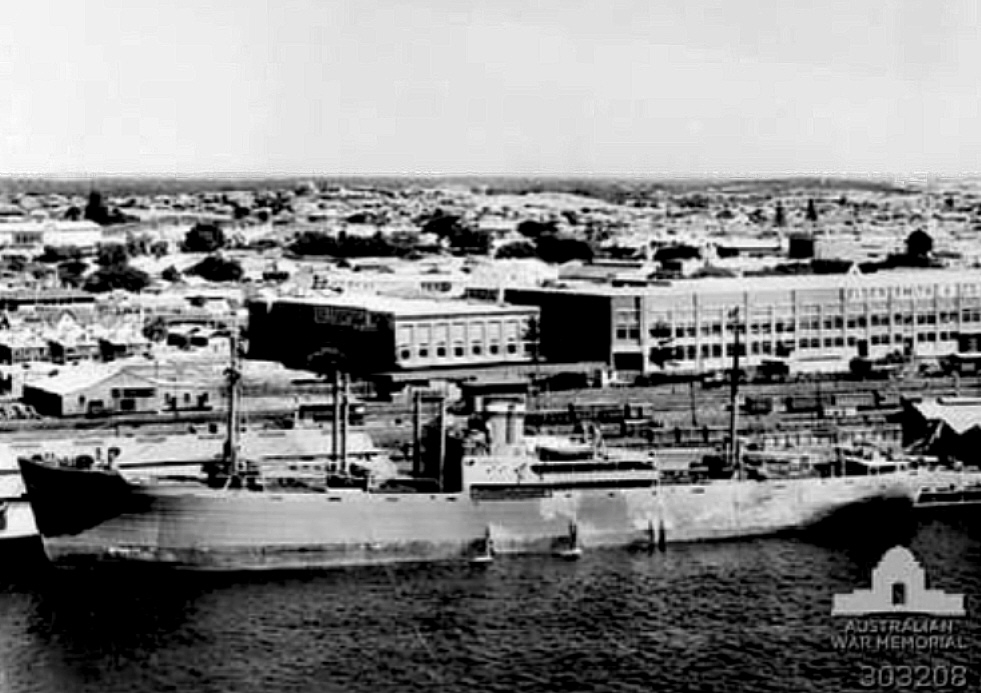
- Dona Nati photographed in Fremantle, Australia, December 22, 1941. Australian War Memorial photograph. (NAVAL Historical Collection)

History

Philippines
- Name: Dona Nati
- Builder: Cantieri Riuniti Adriatico, San Marco, Italy
- Launched: 1939
- Fate: Scrapped at Kaohsiung, Taiwan 1971

General characteristics
- Tonnage: 5,011 GRT; 8,560 DWT
- Length: 413 ft 3 in (126.0 m), 439 ft 4 in (133.9 m) LOA
- Beam: 55 ft 7 in (16.9 m)
- Draught: 25 ft 4 in (7.7 m)
- Speed: 14 knots (26 km/h; 16 mph)

Dona Nati was one of three (Note: Others are Dona Aurora and Dona Aniceta) identical cargo ships built in 1939 by Cantieri Riuniti dell'Adriatico, San Marco, Trieste, Italy, for the De La Rama Steamship Company, Inc., Iloilo, Philippines, intended for service between the Philippines West Coast and North America. The ship was engaged in normal commerce until it became a key player in events in the Philippines after December 7, 1941, and the Japanese invasion of the islands. Dona Nati had arrived in Manila along with the ships President Grant, (Note: This is apparently the SS President Grant (1920) originally named Centennial State then President Adams in 1923 and President Grant in 1940. A former President Grant was at the time also in transit to become part of the Pensacola Convoy.) John Lykes, Cape Fairweather, and American Leader in a convoy escorted by the USS Boise (CL-47) on December 4, 1941. She had escaped to Australia where she became particularly notable as being one of only three ships to successfully run the Japanese blockade in attempts to supply the forces cut off in the Philippines. The ship was retained under Army control and on April 28, 1943, was one of twenty-eight vessels forming the fleet available to the Southwest Pacific command under General MacArthur.

== Pre war ==
On July 29, Japanese military officials prevented Japanese cargo for the United States to be loaded aboard Dona Nati in Shanghai, China, in the first Japanese retaliation for the United States' freezing trade with Japan on July 25, 1941. On November 17, 1941, the ship left Hawaii in convoy with other vessels bound for Guam and the Philippines escorted by the cruiser USS Boise (CL-47), arriving in Manila on December 4, 1941.

== Wartime operations ==
Dona Nati arrived in Manila and began discharging cargo consigned to that port, and on or about December 10, 1941, got orders from the owners to discharge cargo consigned to Hong Kong and Shanghai as well. On December 12, with Japanese landings on Luzon, the Navy ordered the ship to sail to avoid loss, with the ship sailing for Fremantle, Australia, December 13, 1941, to discharge cargo that was still aboard. In January the Dona Nati was acquired for use of the United States Army Forces in Australia (USAFIA). (Note: United States Forces in Australia (USFIA), the original name, was used until re-designation as United States Army Forces in Australia (USAFIA) on 5 January 1942, previous to Dona Nati's blockade running voyage.) Details of the exact terms of the acquisition were not entirely clear during the early days of the war, but by April Dona Nati was noted as being under War Shipping Administration time charter.

The mission of USAFIA initially was "to dispatch airplanes and ammunition to the Philippines, and, in cooperation with U. S. naval authorities, to retain vessels long enough to unload at any port of his selection, to be reached by any route that he chose" and under that mission Dona Nati sailed under Captain Ramon Pons from Brisbane, Australia on February 18, arriving March 10 at Cebu City with supplies that included an estimated 5,000 tons of rations for the Philippines. Thus Dona Nati became one of only three ships, the others being Coast Farmer and the Chinese ship Anhui, to break the Japanese blockade and return. One of the other De La Rama ships, Don Isidro was sunk 19–20 February making an attempt. Together the three ships brought into the Philippines "more than 10,000 tons of rations, 4,000 rounds of small arms ammunition, 8,000 rounds of 81-mm. ammunition, and miscellaneous medical, signal, and engineer supplies" but all had to be transshipped on smaller, fast interisland vessels, few of which made the trip north successfully.

Dona Nati left Cebu City just hours before the arrival of a Japanese cruiser that shelled the port, taking with her civilian passengers fleeing the Philippines (one escaping from as far as China), and arrived on 30 March in Brisbane after taking a circuitous route lasting twenty-two days.

In July 1942, the ship was noted as transporting elements of the 91st Engineer Regiment to the Cape York Peninsula to construct advance airfields. By March 6, 1943 Dona Nati had been withdrawn from the South West Pacific Area (SWPA) fleet. The ship next appears arriving at Guadalcanal on April 2, 1943, where she came under heavy air attack and claimed one plane shot down and one damaged; she departed April 7.

== Postwar ==
The ship was sold in 1951, replaced by a larger and faster Dona Nati cargo liner built early that year by Nishi Nippon of Nagasaki, Japan, to Japanese interests and renamed Asahisan Maru then Akakurasan Maru (1956) until sold to Wah Kwong & Co. in 1964 and renamed Union Venture then sold again in 1968 and named Gelora of the Asia-Africa Shipping Co. until scrapped at Kaohsiung.

== References cited ==
- Attempts to Supply The Philippines by Sea: 1942; Charles Dana Gibson and E. Kay Gibson
