= De La Rama Steamship Company, Inc. =

Former sugar and US shipping company

- Type: Private
- Industry: sugar, transportation and shipping
- Founded: 1930 in New York City
- Key people: Isidro de la Rama; Esteban de la Rama; Antonio Maria Bayot; Hijos de la Rama; Luiz Francisco Meirelles; Sergio Osmeña Jr.

De La Rama Steamship Company, Inc. was a shipping company founded in New York City by the Isidro de la Rama family in 1930, which was founded to export sugar from their large sugar plantations in the Philippines. Isidro de la Rama was also commissioned by the United States Army to be a blockade runner to bring supplies, such as food and ammunition, to the United States Army and Philippine Army after the invasion of the Empire of Japan into the Philippines.

== History ==
Isidro de la Rama's first company was Hijos de la Rama, founded in Talisay, in the port at Iloilo City. His ships and tugboats operated out of Panay in the 1800s. Isidro de la Rama had four sons, who were all part-time employees of the company. Isidro de la Rama's son, Esteban de la Rama, managed the firm after his father's death. The De La Rama Steamship Company was very active in supporting the US during World War I, shipping needed abaca, copra and coal. Esteban was also a General in the Philippine army. Another son of Hijos de la Rama worked in the firm until 1930, when it was incorporated at Iloilo. The De la Rama Steamship Company manager was Benito H. Lopez and Esteban was the shipping agent. Isidro de la Rama died on June 10, 1897. Before World War II, the United States purchased about 80% of Philippine exports; the main product was sugar. The De La Rama Steamship Company's Los Angeles representative was Antonio Maria Bayot. The nephew of the Portuguese prime minister in New York City, Luiz Francisco Meirelles, was manager of the New York City office. Esteban de la Rama won the election to the Philippine senate in 1941. After the war, Sergio Osmeña Jr. became president of the De La Rama Steamship Company. De la Rama Steamship was able to charter three large new ships from the National Development Corporation (NDC). Two ships taken for the war effort were returned, and they also purchased two war surplus Type C1-B cargo ships. Three war surplus coastal ships, called "FS" ships, were acquired with three "F" cargo ships. To start passenger service, four ship liners were acquired. Airlines ended passenger service in the 1960s, but cargo shipping continued.

== Sugar train ==
One of the trains used at the Hijos de la Rama plant is on display Hacienda Hijos de La Rama, San Isidro, Negros, is on display at Star City Amusement Park, Manila.

== World War II ==
With the start of World War II, shipping to and from the Philippines became rare. The De La Rama Steamship Company's fleet of ships was used to help the war effort. During World War II, the De La Rama Steamship Company operated Merchant navy ships for the United States Shipping Board. During World War II, the De La Rama Steamship Company was active with charter shipping with the Maritime Commission and War Shipping Administration. The De La Rama Steamship Company operated Liberty ships and Victory Ships for the merchant navy. The ship was run by its De La Rama Steamship Company crew and the US Navy supplied United States Navy Armed Guards to man the deck guns and radio. The company successfully got the Don Isidro past Japanese blockades to supply Corregidor in the Philippines, however, only 10% of the goods made it intact to their destination.

== Ships ==
This is a list of ships the De La Rama Steamship Company owned:

- Cabanbanan
- Moleilo
- Taculin
- Iloilo 560-ton steam cargo
- Escalante 1Z 95-ton motor cargo
  - Four new ships for New York to the Philippines, Hong Kong, and Shanghai routes.
- Don Esteban, a German passenger ship built by Krupp at Kiel in 1934, 425-foot, 5,011-ton, became bareboat charter by to US Army
- Don Isidro, a passenger ship built in 1939, attacked by Japan on February 19, 1942, burned and lost under U.S. Army charter.
- Dona Aurora, built at Cantieri Riuniti dell'Adriatico at Trieste, Italy in 1938, torpedoed by Italian submarine on December 25, 1942.
- Dona Nati, built in 1939 at Cantieri Riuniti dell'Adriatico
- Dona Aniceta, passenger ship built in 1940 at Cantieri Riuniti dell'Adriatico, became Polish General Bem and then Greek Maco Prosperity, scrapped in 1972.
- Madbukaru, weighed 191 tons, used by US Army for war.
- Wind Rush, an 8,600-ton cargo ship from the Shepard Steamship Company. It was built in 1918 by Columbia River SB with the name SS Westbrook, caught fire in the Caribbean on December 21, 1939, became Kavkaz in 1945, and was scrapped in 1977
- Moleno, the SS Waialeale and was converted to a 3,092 ton luxury passenger liner service started in 1947, built in 1928 by Bethlehem Steel Co., sold off in 1951 and broken up in Yokohama, Japan in 1956.
- Dona Aurora (2), became Sarangani Bay, General Cargo Ship built in 1969
- Dona Alicia (2), built in Japan, 153.7m x 19.7m, top speed of 17 knots and became Lingayen Gulf (sister of Dona Aurora (2). .

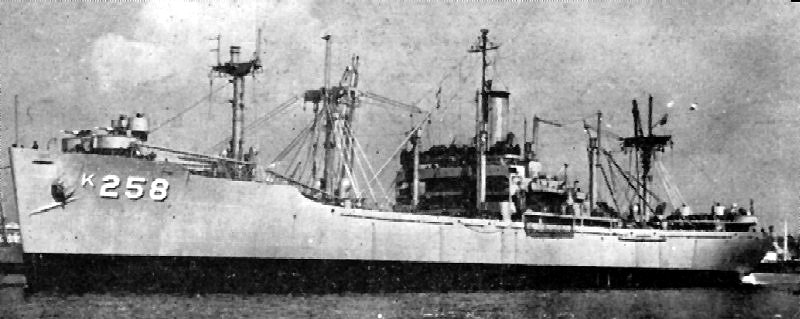
A Victory ship of World War II

Liberty ship of World War II

In World War II, the company operated:

- Liberty Ships:
  - J. Frank Cooper
  - William Sproule
  - Richard B. Moore
  - George Rogers Clark
  - Andreas Honcharenko
  - Henry White
- Victory Ships:
  - Southwestern Victory
  - Norwich Victory
  - Bartlesville Victory
  - Hillsdale Victory

The De La Rama Steamship Company also chartered three Swedish-flag and three Norwegian-flag ships for trans-Pacific trade.

== See also ==
- World War II United States Merchant Navy
