= Panay Electric Company =

Electric power distribution company

Panay Electric Company, Inc.
- Type: Public
- Industry: Power distributor
- Predecessor: Iloilo Light Company
- Founded: May 14, 1921; 105 years ago
- Founder: Esteban de la Rama
- Defunct: February 28, 2020; 6 years ago
- Fate: Superseded by MORE Power
- Headquarters: 12 General Luna St., City Proper, Iloilo City, Philippines
- Key people: Mariano Cacho Jr., Chairman; Luis Miguel A. Cacho, President and CEO
- Owners: Cacho family First Philippine Holdings Corporation
- Website: www.panayelectric.com

Panay Electric Company, Inc., also known as Panay Electric or simply PECO, is an electric power distribution company in the Philippines. It served the City of Iloilo from 1923 until 2020, when its franchise service expired and MORE Electric and Power Corporation (MORE Power) took over.

Although PECO is no longer the main power distributor for Iloilo City, the company continue to provide a variety of services, including meter management, electrical infrastructure maintenance, and safety-related services.

== History ==
=== Iloilo Light Company ===
Electricity in Iloilo was introduced as early as 1895 when the Escuela de Artes y Oficios de Iloilo (now reestablished as Iloilo Science and Technology University) developed its own power generator.

In 1902, during the American Colonial Period, Iloilo Light Company was founded by American mining engineer Joseph Clayton Nichols. This marked the first time electricity in the province was made available for public subscription and established the first light company outside Luzon. In 1908, Nichols sold the Iloilo Light Company to fellow Americans and electrical engineers Albert Bryan and Robert Landon.

=== Founding of Panay Electric Company ===
On February 22, 1921, Philippine Revolution general and senator Esteban de la Rama was granted a franchise "to install, operate, and maintain an electric light, heat, and power system in the municipalities of Iloilo, La Paz, Jaro and Arevalo" by virtue of Act 2983. He then organized Panay Electric Company (PECO) on May 14, 1921.

In April 1922, PECO became the majority owner of the Iloilo Light Company by purchasing three-fourths of the firm, thereby operating the power distribution system. PECO took full control of the Iloilo Light Company in February 1923 after the Philippine Legislature passed Act No. 3035, authorizing de la Rama to transfer his franchise to the company. On June 12, 1923, PECO began serving as Iloilo City's electric power distributor.

=== Cacho takeover and martial law ===
On January 27, 1927, Candelaria Soriano Cacho acquired the whole company, making it the first 100-percent Filipino-owned private company in the Philippines. Cacho died later that year, and her son, Mariano Cacho, inherited the company and continued its operations.

In 1929, the 8th Legislature passed Act 3665, granting PECO a new 50-year franchise and expanding its service area to include Santa Barbara, Pavia, and Oton. In 1974, under martial law, the company faced technical and financial problems, resulting in the towns being taken over and serviced by the electric cooperative ILECO 1, leaving the City of Iloilo as the only area serviced by PECO.

=== Acquisition by the López group ===
In 1996, First Philippine Holdings Corporation of the influential López family of Iloilo, acquired 30% of the capital stock of PECO, leaving 70% for the Cacho family.

=== Franchise expiration controversy ===
On January 18, 2019, PECO's franchise expired and was not renewed by Congress. Billionaire Enrique Razon-owned MORE Electric and Power Corporation (MORE Power) filed an expropriation case to acquire the assets of PECO. MORE Power was granted a 25-year contract to serve and operate the city's electricity distribution system by virtue of Republic Act 11212, signed by President Rodrigo Duterte on February 14, 2019. On February 28, 2020, MORE Power began the takeover of PECO’s assets and officially commenced operations as the city’s new electric power distributor, ending PECO's 97-year-long operation in Iloilo City.

== Controversies ==
=== 1990 labor dispute and union strike ===
A significant labor issue arose in 1990 when PECO attempted to transfer union vice-president Enrique Huyan to a new position, which he declined, citing potential demotion and interference with his union duties. His refusal led to his dismissal, which sparked a union strike later declared illegal by the National Labor Relations Commission (NLRC). The NLRC awarded Huyan and another union officer separation benefits and damages, though these were later modified by a higher court.

=== Assets and franchise dispute against MORE Power ===
PECO faced escalating controversy as tycoon Enrique Razon Jr.'s MORE Power vied for control of Iloilo City's electricity franchise. Accusations flew as MORE Power accused PECO's owners, the Cacho family, of blackmailing customers with threats of operational disruptions upon the expiration of their franchise. MORE Power criticized PECO for neglecting technological investments, resulting in poor service for the city. In response, PECO defended its operations, claiming to have resolved past issues and pledging not to shut down facilities amid the transition. The Department of Energy and Energy Regulatory Commission assured the public of a smooth transition, preparing measures to prevent citywide blackouts upon PECO's franchise expiry on January 18, 2019.
