= Jorge L. Araneta =

Filipino businessman (born 1936)

Jorge León Araneta
- Born: February 16, 1936 (age 90); Manila, Commonwealth of the Philippines
- Education: University of the Philippines Diliman (BSBA)
- Occupations: Businessman; Philanthropist; Consul
- Office: CEO, Chairman, and President of The Araneta Group
- Spouse: María Stella Márquez Zawadski (m. 1962)
- Parent(s): J. Amado Araneta (father); Ester B. Araneta-Araneta (mother)

Jorge León "Nene" Araneta Araneta (born March 8, 1936) is a prominent Filipino businessman. Araneta chairs the Araneta Group of Companies which is engaged in property development, lodging and hospitality (Araneta City, Novotel Manila Araneta City, Ibis Styles Araneta City), food and dining (Pizza Hut, Taco Bell, and Dairy Queen Philippine franchise holder), entertainment and leisure (Araneta Coliseum, New Frontier Theater), and beauty and philanthropy (Binibining Pilipinas Charities, Inc., J. Amado Araneta Foundation). Araneta also served as a director of the Philippine Seven Corporation (PSC), and as one of the co-founders of Medical Doctors Inc. (owner and operator of Makati Medical Center).

He also serves as a Consul at the Colombian Embassy.

== Early life and education ==
Araneta was born in Manila, Philippines and is the second child and only son of J. Amado Araneta and Ester Bustamante Araneta. He finished high school at the De La Salle University in Manila and later received his Bachelor of Science in Business Administration (BSBA) degree from the University of the Philippines Diliman in 1958, where he became a member of the Upsilon Sigma Phi fraternity in 1953.

== Business career ==
During his teenage years, he worked closely with his father until graduating college and steadily rose through the ranks of the family business. In 1970, he took the helm of the Araneta Group and his father's related businesses after the latter's retirement. Under his leadership, he further expanded the family business ranging from real estate to agriculture, investments and food and dining services. Some selected businesses gave rise to some of the country's many firsts within the retail, leisure, and entertainment industries, which included the Fiesta Carnival in 1971, the country's first indoor amusement park; the Farmers Market in 1975, one of best and the largest wet markets in the country; the Ali Mall in 1976, which became the first indoor enclosed mall in the country; and other commercial establishments throughout the 1980s. Due to the area's attractive location and its close proximity to entertainment venues, this enticed businesses that were primarily based in Manila to expand their business to the Araneta Center, such as the SM Cubao, one of the first and the largest SM Department Store in the country, and opened in October 1978; the Rustan's Superstore, designed by Carlos A. Santos-Viola; and the National Book Store Superbranch, designed by Rogelio Garcia Villarosa, which opened in 1972, before being upgraded into a 9-storey building in 1982; Other real estate developments that Araneta developed include the New Farmers Plaza Shopping Center, which serves as the rebranded version of Coliseum Farmers Market and Shopping Center following its 1985 renovation; the Marikina Shoe Expo; the Aurora Tower, which was completed in 1984; and the Araneta Center Bus Terminal, which opened in 1993 and became the country's first and oldest integrated bus terminal. The development also included the renovation of the Araneta Coliseum in 1999.

Aside from his interests at the Araneta Center, Araneta also expanded his interests into other businesses ranging from real estate, hospitals, mining, convenience stores, and restaurants. Under his subsidiary company, the Progressive Development Corporation (PDC), Araneta owned various land banks in San Mateo, Rizal, Rodriguez, Rizal and Bacolod, which later became known as The Upper East complex, and also owns shares on major properties in the Makati Central Business District, which are The Peninsula Manila hotel and the Makati Medical Center. Araneta and PDC also own shares of Atok-Big Wedge Company, Inc., a listed mining company. On August 1983, following the assassination of Ninoy Aquino, Araneta also began venturing in the convenience store business, as he served as a director of the Philippine Seven Corporation (PSC), the Philippine franchisee of 7-Eleven. He ended his term on July 17, 2025 and he remained as a member of the Advisory Board of PSC. In the same year, Araneta also bought shares in Wenphil Corporation, the Philippine franchisee of Wendy's. In 1984, Araneta also bought franchise rights of Pizza Hut, and eventually expanded his franchised restaurants, which included Taco Bell in 2005 and Dairy Queen in 2006.

In the late 1980s to the early 1990s, Araneta faced a multitude of challenges that impacted the company's future prospects as the Araneta Center's glory began to fade in the face of many challenges, from the massive fire that hit the Farmers Plaza to the company's financial problems, the numerous coups against the Presidency of Corazon Aquino and the 1997 Asian financial crisis. Due to the company's financial struggles, the Araneta Group also temporarily halted property development projects in Cubao and in property investment projects in Makati City until in 1997, as he saw the development of major rail lines, the LRT Line 2 and the MRT Line 3, located adjacent to the complex. After seeing the potential to revive the complex from its distress, due to the area's location and connectivity to vital areas around Metro Manila, Araneta vowed to finish his father's vision and saw the opportunity of transforming the Araneta Center into a transit-oriented development with a garden city concept and spearheaded the planning of the Araneta Center Redevelopment Plan in 1999–2000, and the program's implementation in 2002, with the construction of the Gateway Mall and its completion in 2004. Since then, Araneta planned to expand the complex's retail shopping area from 372,000 m^{2} (4,000,000 sq ft) to 972,000 m^{2} (10,460,000 sq ft) of shopping area by adding 600,000 m^{2} (6,500,000 sq ft) of floor area, and also expanded his interests in real estate from malls and entertainment venues, to offices, condominiums and hotels.

The redevelopment master plan also led the construction of the Manhattan Garden City in 2006, which became the first transit-oriented residential development; the Araneta Center Cyberpark in 2007, including the present-day Cyberpark Master Plan in 2014; the Gateway Tower in 2010, the Novotel Manila Araneta City in 2012, and the New Gateway Mall and Ibis Styles Araneta City in 2018. The master plan also included the second renovation of the Araneta Coliseum and the Farmers Plaza in 2012, the revival project of the New Frontier Theater in 2014, and the renovation of Ali Mall, SM Cubao, and Shopwise Supermarket, which were all completed in 2010. In 2019, Araneta rebranded the complex, from the Araneta Center to the Araneta City as "the city of firsts".

As the redevelopment plan continues in full swing, Araneta has also planned to build more properties to the Araneta City, such as the Gateway Mall 3, the Civic Plaza, the Icon tower, an integrated resort with a heritage area, and a 4-tower mixed-use development within Ali Mall. Araneta aims to complete the Araneta City master plan within 2030, under his company's Vision 2030 plan, which aims to develop 3,000,000 m^{2} (32,000,000 sq ft) square meters of gross floor area within the mixed use development.

== Personal life ==
Araneta is married to Stella Márquez-Araneta from Colombia who won as Miss International in 1960. She is of Spanish and Polish heritage. They were married in 1962 at the Metropolitan Cathedral of Saint Peter in Cali, Colombia. His siblings were Judy A. Roxas (1934–2025) and Maria Lourdes A. Fores (1938–2023). Among his nephews and nieces are former senator Mar Roxas and the late chef Margarita Fores.

He is also an avid traveller, a cockfighter, a wine collector, and also owns a wine shop in Novotel Manila Araneta Center, named Sabor Bar de Vinos. He also loves eating Italian food.

== Awards ==
- 2017 DLSAA (De La Salle Alumni Association) Distinguished Lasallian
- Top Five Best Employers in Asia (Philippines) by the Hewitt Association and the Wall Street Journal, 2003
- Pioneer of Retail Entertainment and PRA President's Award by the Philippine Retailers Association.
- Most Distinguished Alumnus Award from the UP College of Business Administration (2005)
- Upsilon Noble and Outstanding (UNO) Award (2020)
- 2026 Lifetime Achievement Award by the PropertyGuru Philippines
- 2026 Most Distinguished Alumnus Award by the University of the Philippines Alumni Association (UPAA)
