= Jesus Varela =

His Excellency Jesus Y. Varela
- Bishop Emeritus of Sorsogon
- See: Sorsogon
- In office: 2003 - retired
- Successor: Most Rev. Arturo Mandin Bastes
- Previous post: March 28, 1967

Orders
- Ordination: March 17, 1956

Personal details
- Born: December 18, 1927 Bacolod, Negros Occidental, Philippine Islands
- Died: February 23, 2018 (aged 90) Pasay, Philippines
- Denomination: Roman Catholic

Jesus Ybiernas Varela (December 18, 1927 – February 23, 2018) was a Filipino prelate of the Catholic Church. He became the Bishop Emeritus of the Diocese of Sorsogon on his retirement on April 16, 2003. He was appointed bishop of Sorsogon on November 27, 1980. Prior to that he served as the first ever sitting Bishop of the Diocese of Ozamis. He also served as the Auxiliary Bishop of the Archdiocese of Zamboanga and titular Bishop of Tatilti.

Styles of Jesus Y. Varela
- Reference style: Most Reverend
- Spoken style: Your Excellency
- Religious style: Bishop

== Life ==
He was born on December 18, 1927, in Bacolod, the son of Vicente Varela, a judge from Bago within the same province of Negros Occidental. He is a direct descendant of Gregorio Varela a Spaniard who was one of Bago's founding fathers, and through Gregorio's wife Josefa Araneta he is a member of the Araneta family.

Varela attended the Colegio Del Sagrado Corazon in Iloilo City for kindergarten, and the Iloilo Normal School for half of his elementary years. When his father was appointed a provincial judge in Surigao, he transferred to the Surigao Elementary School. The family later moved to Sorsogon when his father was reassigned. He studied at the Sorsogon National High School between 1946 and 1949, after which he studied for three years at the Our Lady of Peñafrancia Minor Seminary. Later, he also studied in the University of Santo Tomas in Manila, earning a Ph.L. degree in 1952. Between 1958 and 1961 he completed coursework at the University of the Angelicum in Rome.

Varela was ordained on March 17, 1956 in Cebu City, where his father last served as a Provincial Judge. He joined the Society of Jesus, following in the footsteps of his older brother Fr. Mariano Varela, who was a Jesuit priest. Later on his two younger sisters and one of his cousins became nuns. The latest in the family to join the religious service is his nephew Fr. Richard Varela of the Salesian Order.

His family is also involved in government, his nephew the late Francis Varela served as Undersecretary for Finance of the Department of Education (Philippines), and his cousin the late Jose Varela, served as Deputy Minister of Energy of Philippines and later was elected an Assemblyman for Negros Occidental.

In addition to his service as a bishop, Varela was involved in broadcasting. In 1972, he served as the Vice President of UNDA, a Catholic radio and television organization, and in 1974 he became its president. He was also President of the Philippine Federation of Catholic Broadcasters, and used this position to criticize President Ferdinand Marcos, at a time when all media were censored or under the direct control of the government.

He also served as Chairman of the Episcopal Commission on Family and Life, of the Catholic Bishops' Conference of the Philippines, and was a member of its permanent council (to which all Filipino Catholic bishops belong).

== Ministry ==
- 1956–1958 - Chaplain, Agriculture College, Pili, Camarines Sur
- 1956–1957 - Curate, Pili, Camarines Sur
- 1957–1958 - Archdiocesan Vice Chancellor, Caceres
- 1961–1963 - CATWELO/CBCP Asst. Secretary General, Manila
- 1963–1965 - Archdiocesan Chancellor, Caceres
- 1967–1975 - Cursillos de Cristiandad/Archdiocesan Director, Caceres
- 1967–1971 - Auxiliary Bishop, Zamboanga
- 1968–1972 - Member, CBCP Administrative Council
- 1971–1981 - Diocesan Bishop, Ozamis
- 1972
- Vice President, UNDA Philippines
- President, Philippine Federation of Catholic Broadcasters
- 1974– President, UNDA Philippines
- 1980–1994 - Diocesan Bishop, Sorsogon
- 1982– ?
- Chairman, Episcopal Commission on Family and Life
- Member, CBCP Permanent Council

== Sources ==
- http://www.cbcponline.org/bishops/bishops/varela.html
- http://www.catholic-hierarchy.org/bishop/bvarela.html ^{[self-published]}
- http://www.cbcponline.net/jurisdictions/sorsogon.html
- http://www.igreens.org.uk/catholic_bishops_support_gmos.htm
- Aquino appoints new Pag-Ibig execs
