= Irene Marcos =

Filipino exile (born 1960)

Irene Marcos-Araneta
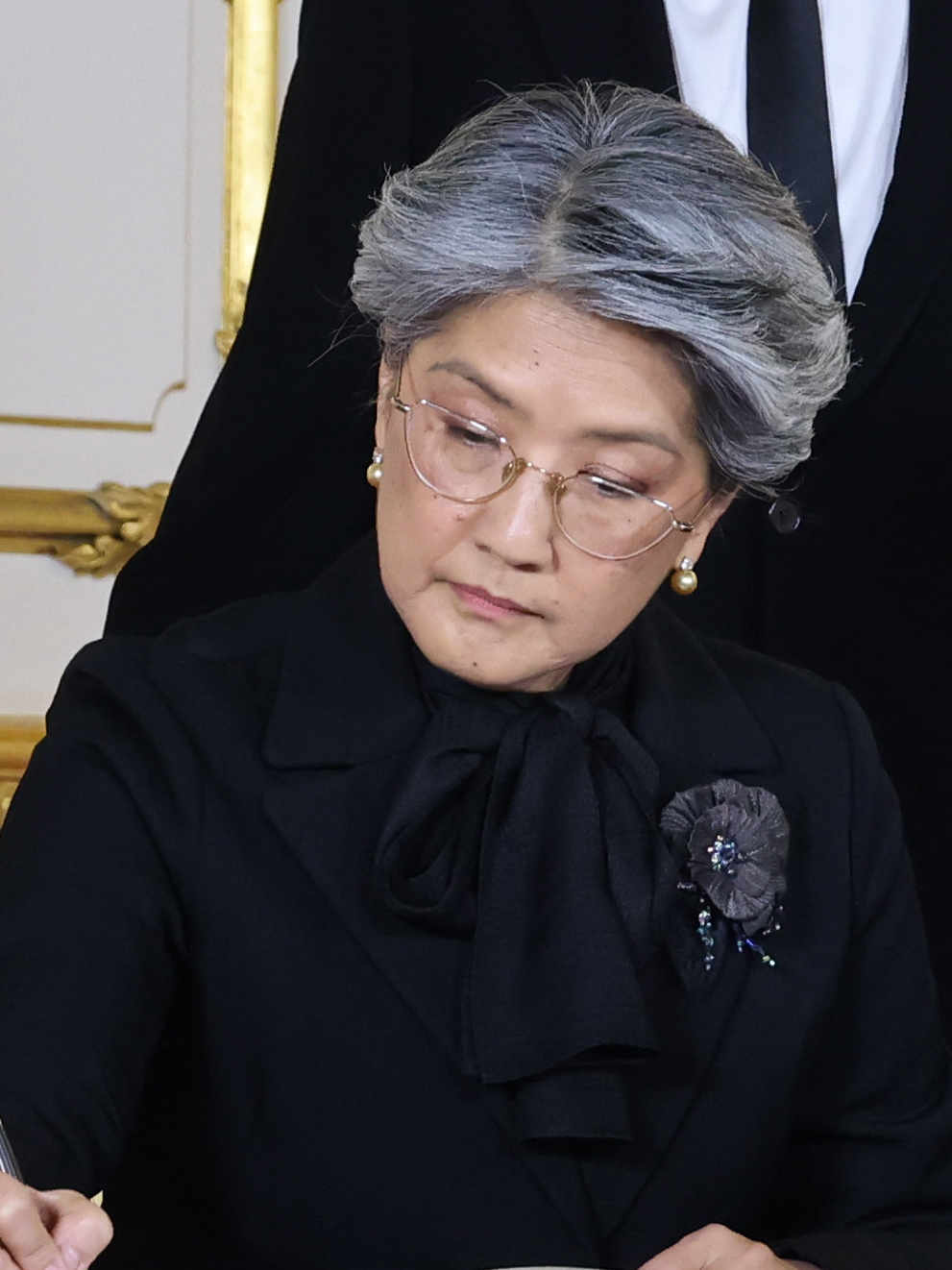
- Marcos in 2022
- Born: Maria Victoria Irene Romualdez Marcos; September 16, 1960 (age 65)
- Spouse: Gregorio Maria Araneta III (m. 1983)
- Children: Alfonso Fernando Luis Araneta, Luis Mariano Constantino Araneta
- Parents: Ferdinand Marcos (father); Imelda Marcos (mother)
- Relatives: Araneta family (by marriage); Marcos family; Romualdez family

Irene Romualdez Marcos-Araneta (Tagalog: [aɪˈɾin ˈmaɾkɔs]; born Maria Victoria Irene Romualdez Marcos; September 16, 1960) is the third child of the late former president Ferdinand Marcos and former first lady Imelda Marcos. Her brother Bongbong Marcos is the current president of the Philippines.

Marcos's presence is known as being "the quiet one" because among the Marcos siblings, she is the only one not holding public office. Her best-remembered role in her father's 21-year rule involved expensive events, such as her 1983 wedding to Gregorio "Greggy" Maria Araneta III which was said to cost US$10.3 million, and for her September 1985 party on the presidential yacht BRP Ang Pangulo, whose lavishness caused a scandal when video coverage of it came out in the wake of the 1986 EDSA Revolution.

She gained media attention after being tagged in the Panama Papers leak, and for triggering student protests after her attendance in various campus events.

== Controversies ==
She, her mother and brother have moved for the reversal of the Sandiganbayan's decision to forfeit in favor of the government all assets, investments, securities, properties, shares, interests, and funds of Arelma Inc. being managed by Merrill Lynch Asset Management in New York.

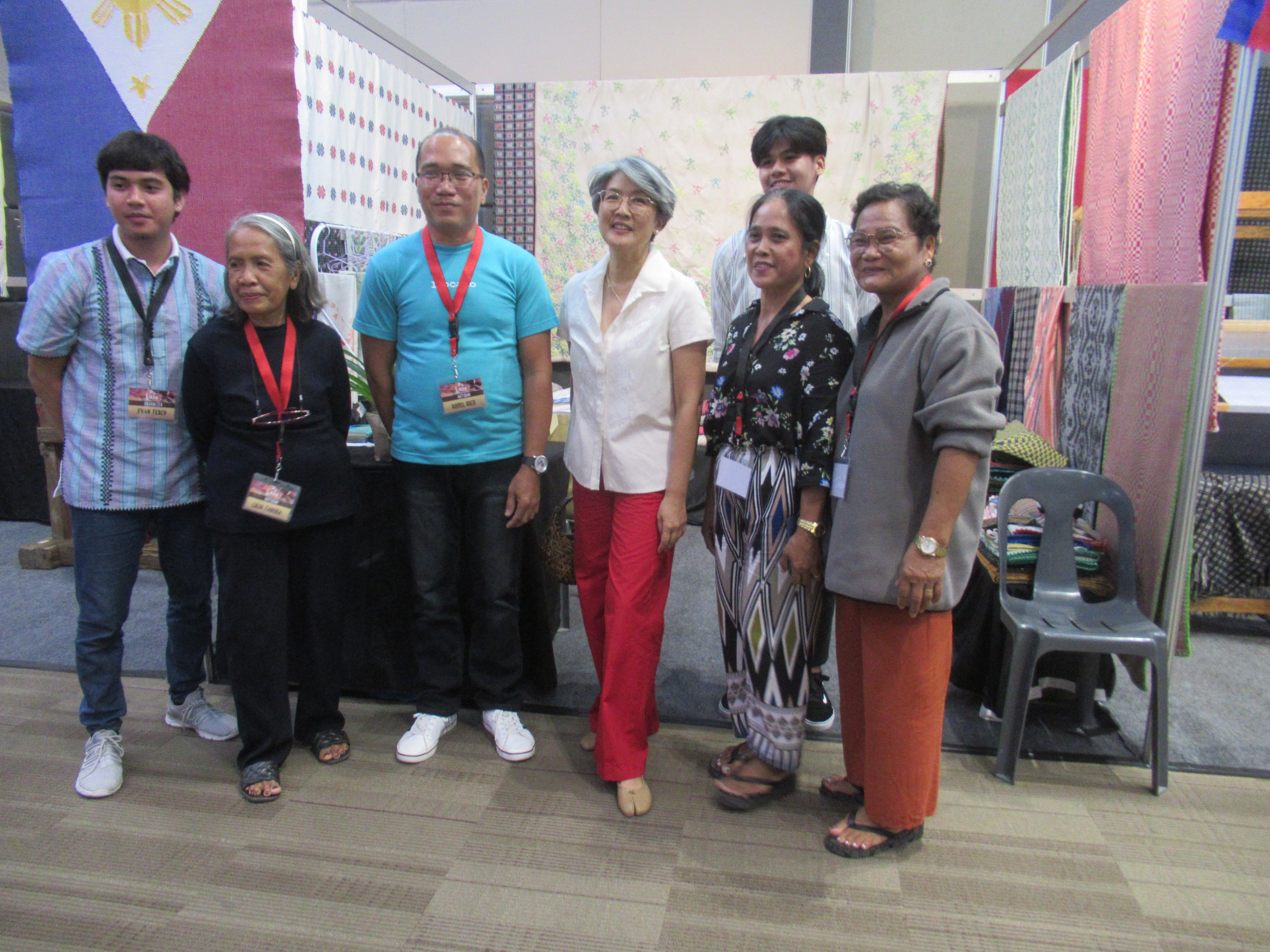
Irene Marcos with Filipino artisans

== Personal life ==
Marcos is married to businessman Gregorio Maria Araneta III, with whom she has two children. On February 21, 2024, Luis Marcos Araneta, husband of Alexandra Rocha is the new president of Araneta Properties and Gregorio Araneta III group of companies after resignation of Crisanto Roy Alcid.

She was named in the internationally controversial Panama Papers, along with her husband, Gregorio Maria Araneta III, her sister Imee Marcos and her nephews Borgy Manotoc, Matthew Joseph Manotoc, and Ferdinand Richard Michael Manotoc.

== See also ==
- Imee Marcos
- Bongbong Marcos
- Aimee Marcos
