= Novotel Manila Araneta City =

Hotel in Quezon City, Philippines

- The hotel in 2016
- Interactive map of the Novotel Manila Araneta City area
- Former names: Novotel Manila Araneta Center

General information
- Status: Completed
- Location: Gen. Aguinaldo Avenue, Araneta City, Cubao, Quezon City, Philippines
- Coordinates: 14°37′11.96″N 121°3′15.3″E
- Construction started: February 2012
- Completed: July 29, 2014
- Opening: October 2015 (soft opening); March 8, 2016 (grand opening)
- Cost: ₱3 billion
- Owner: Araneta Hotels Inc.
- Management: AccorHotels

Height
- Height: 85 m (278.9 ft)

Technical details
- Floor count: 24
- Floor area: 40,000 m^{2} (430,000 sq ft)

Other information
- Number of rooms: 401
- Number of restaurants: 5
- Parking: 250 slots

Website
- www.novotelmanilaaranetacenter.com

Novotel Manila Araneta City, formerly named Novotel Manila Araneta Center, is a 4-star hotel located at the Araneta City complex in Quezon City, Philippines. The mid-scale, full-service hotel is part of AccorHotels, and the first hotel under the Novotel brand in the Philippines. Completed in 2014, the hotel was fully opened in 2016 and features a total of 401 contemporary suites. The hotel currently serves as the flagship mid-scale hotel within the development.

== History ==
The plans for the development of a 400-room business hotel within the Araneta City was laid out as early as 2000, as part the Araneta Center Master Plan. The plans were finalized within early 2008, before announcing the launch of the hotel in July 2008. In December 2008, the Araneta Group, through Araneta Center Hotel, Inc., announced their joint venture partnership project with AccorHotels in a press conference held within Aurora Tower. After 4 years of negotiations and design changes, the hotel was officially launched in February 2012 with a ceremonial lowering of a time capsule, and presented a presentation of the hotel's features, interiors and amenities, which is touted by the Araneta Group as the “crown jewel” for the complex's redevelopment project.

The cost for the construction of the hotel was around ₱3 billion and was topped off on July 29, 2014. It was initially planned to open partially by the end of 2014, and was later moved on early 2015 that the hotel will start accepting guests. However, the hotel had its soft opening later in October 2015. On March 8, 2016, then-President Benigno Aquino III, along with other executives and officials, led the grand opening launch of the hotel.

== Location ==
The hotel is located adjacent to the Araneta Coliseum, standing at the coliseum's south-eastern corner and is accessible to nearby transport hubs and railway stations, such as the MRT 3 Cubao Station, the LRT 2 Cubao Station and other transport terminals.

The hotel is also accessible to nearby malls and buildings within the Araneta City, such as SM Cubao, the Farmers Plaza, the Ali Mall, the Manhattan Gardens condominiums, the Araneta City Cyberpark towers, and the New Frontier Theater. The hotel also serves as a part of the Gateway Square, a 5-hectare (12-acre) mixed-use complex within the Araneta City, which also consists of the Novotel, the Gateway Mall, the Gateway Mall 2, the Gateway Tower, the Gateway Office Building, the Ibis Styles Hotel, the Araneta Coliseum, and the Araneta Coliseum Parking Garage South. The development possesses a total floor area of 400,000 m^{2} (4,300,000 sq ft) and was completed in 2023, with the opening of the Gateway Mall 2 and the Ibis Styles Hotel.

== Construction and architecture ==
The building of Novotel Manila Araneta Center has a total of 24 floors. The Araneta Group, under Jorge L. Araneta tapped EEI Corporation as the main contractor in the construction of the hotel building. Araneta also tapped London-based architect Sudhakar Thakurdesai as the design consultant of the project, while tapping Kang Tang of Taiwan and lighting firm Lumino Design for the lighting works of the hotel. Araneta tapped Thai-firm IA49 as the interior designers of the project, while local firm PGAA Creative Design was tapped for the landscaping works of the hotel.

The architectural design of the hotel features an urban contemporary architecture, emphasizing natural light throughout the building, with patches of vertical fins installed on the facade, patterned in blue and red colors, while the hotel's white exterior also features vertical trellises. The hotel also hallmarks a high ceiling, semi circle-shaped main lobby installed with vertical wooden fins and vertical striped LED lights display, emphasizing the Araneta City's historic milestones.

== Features ==
The hotel has 40,000 m^{2} (430,000 sq ft) of total floor area. The hotel also offers a variety of rooms, ranging from the Superior Rooms, Deluxe Rooms, Executive Rooms, Executive Suites, and a Presidential Suite measuring 694 m^{2} (7,470 sq ft) of total floor area located at the 24th floor. The hotel's management operations are also assisted by McLaren Technologies.

Novotel also houses a variety of amenities located within the amenity area, which includes a gym, a play area (Novotel Kids Club), a spa room (In Balance Spa). The hotel also offers a variety of events venues for MICE (Meetings, Incentives, Conventions and Exhibitions) Amenities, and an outdoor events venue, the Versailles Event Garden, which has a total floor area of 2,500 m^{2} (27,000 sq ft) of grass and open spaces. The Versailles Event Garden utilizes the rooftop of the adjacent Araneta Coliseum Parking Garage South and also includes an events tent, and archways. The hotel also features 7 meeting & function rooms named the Pissarro, the Matisse, the Degas, the Van Gogh, the Cezanne, the Renoir and the Gauguin. The hotel also houses the Wintz, Chavannes and Delacroix outdoor gardens; the pillarless Monet Grand Ballroom, capable of housing a total of 1,500 people; and the Premier Lounge, a dome-shaped, high-ceiling lounge offering complete views of the Metro Manila skyline and the Province of Rizal.

The hotel offers 5 different restaurants, namely the Food Exchange Manila, the Gourmet Bar, the sixth Pool Bar and Lounge, the Indulge Gelato, and the Prana Indian Cuisine, the hotel's latest restaurant, which opened its doors on March 15, 2023, and is attached to the Food Exchange Manila. Prior to the opening of Prana, the Indian cuisine menus were part of the cuisines offered by Food Exchange Manila since 2021. Due to the opening of Prana, The Sabor Bar de Vinos, a wine bar owned by Araneta Group CEO Jorge L. Araneta, was eventually integrated to the Food Exchange Manila in 2023.

== Reception ==
The hotel's In Balance Spa was recognized as one of the five recipients in the Philippines to be awarded the ASEAN Spa Services Standard Award 2019 – 2021. The hotel's culinary team won the silver award in the Filipino Cuisine category, while Chef Mikee Villanueva won the bronze award in Fantasy Plated Dessert category at the World Food Expo, held at the SMX Convention Center Manila in Pasay.

The hotel also received recognition from Agoda and Tripadvisor, as the hotel was awarded the Agoda's 2020 Customer Review Award, and the 2020 Tripadvisor Travellers’ Choice Award, for the hotel's services based on the customer's ratings, overall quality experience and high customer reviews. In June 2023, the parent company of the hotel, Araneta Hotels Inc. was garnered the "Dream Employer of the Year" Award at the 18th Employer Branding Awards, which was held in Singapore. During the Philippine Culinary Cup 2023, the hotel's culinary team received a total of 17 medals, consisting of 3 gold medals, 2 silver medals and 13 bronze medals in a wide variety of dishes. During the Accor Asia Awards 2023, which was held in Jakarta, Indonesia, the hotel was awarded the region's "Best F&B Performer" Award and received nominations in three key nominations, which included the Best Loyalty Performance award and Hotel of the Year award.

The hotel was also awarded twice for the LISTeN Program Award by Accor for the year 2019 and 2024 in the midscale market for both the country and in the Asia Pacific region. At the 2024 Accor Choir Games, the Novotel and Ibis Styles Manila team won as the games' grand winners, while the Novotel Manila Araneta City was named as the Midscale Hotel of the Year at the 2024 Travel Daily Media (TDM) Travel Trade Excellence Awards.

== Gallery ==
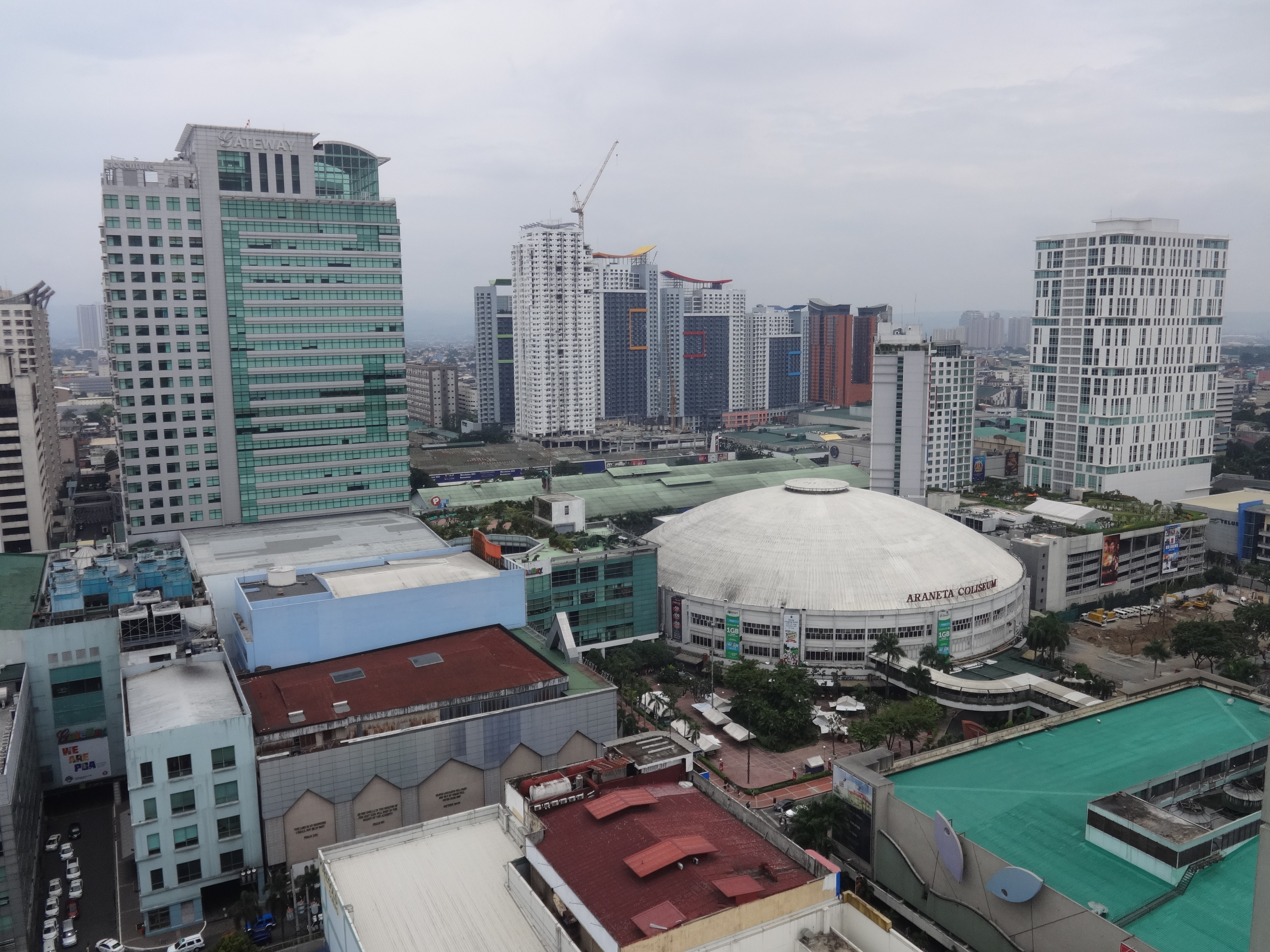
The Novotel Manila Araneta City (2nd building from the right), taken from the Vivaldi Residences Cubao

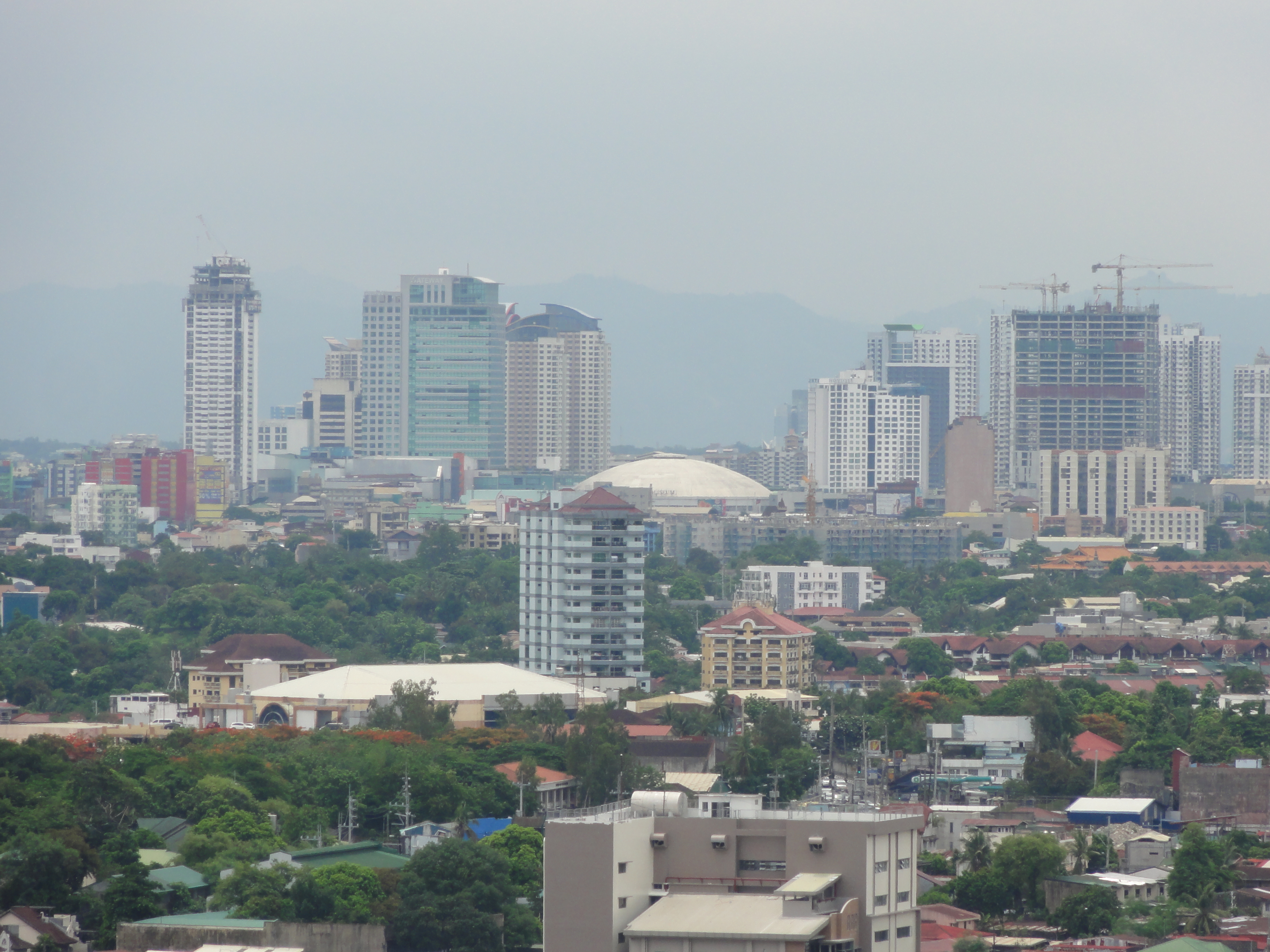
The hotel (2nd building from the right), with surrounding buildings (2015)

Ground view of hotel in April 2022
