= Forés =

Forés is a Spanish surname. Notable people with the surname include:

- Álex Forés (born 2001), Spanish footballer
- Margarita Forés (1959–2025), Filipino chef
- Xavi Forés (born 1985), Spanish motorcycle racer
