= Ali Mall =

Shopping mall in Cubao, Quezon City, Philippines

- Ali Mall in 2024
- Location: Araneta City, Barangay Socorro, Cubao, Quezon City, Philippines
- Coordinates: 14°37′11″N 121°03′10″E
- Opened: June 30, 1976; 50 years ago
- Developer: Araneta City Inc.
- Manager: Araneta City Inc.
- Architect: Sindiong/Ocampo
- Num. of stores: 182 shops and restaurants
- Floor area: 64,500 square meters (694,000 sq ft)
- Floors: 4 (including 5 for parking spaces)
- Parking: 300 cars
- Public transit: Araneta Center-Cubao; Araneta Center-Cubao; 51 53 61 Araneta City Bus Port; UBE Araneta City Bus Port; 1 Cubao; Future: E Cubao

Ali Mall is a shopping mall at the Araneta City in Cubao, Quezon City. Standing along P. Tuazon Boulevard and bounded by major roads along the Araneta City complex, the mall is located across SM Araneta City, and is owned by The Araneta City Inc. (ACI, Inc.), a subsidiary of the Araneta Group. The mall was named in honor of American boxer Muhammad Ali, who won the Thrilla in Manila at the nearby Araneta Coliseum in 1975. Known as the first major shopping mall with integrated shopping in the Philippines, it was built in 1976, making it one of the oldest malls in the country.

== History ==
Ali Mall at night

Ali Mall in 2020

Construction for the mall began in 1975 in the aftermath of Muhammad Ali's boxing victory against Joe Frazier at the Araneta Coliseum, dubbed as the "Thrilla in Manila". As the country had limited malls and department stores during the 1970s, wherein most malls were once only scattered throughout the newly established Metro Manila and selected provinces, primarily in Binondo, which served as the country's main business district before the arrival of bigger business districts such as Makati Central Business District and the Ortigas Center. Due to the success of the malls in Binondo and amidst the rising competition to cater potential customers, this influenced J. Amado Araneta's son, Jorge Araneta, a member of the Araneta family, to lay plans to build a mall and name it after Ali in honor of his victory. As an announcement came in regarding the plans to a mall under his name, Ali was overjoyed with the proposal and did not charge any royalty fees for the project. The mall was completed within the year and was inaugurated on June 30, 1976, and with Ali himself attending the ceremony. During the mall's opening, the mall has a floor area of 62,000 square meters (670,000 sq ft).

The mall was designed by local architectural firm Sindiong-Ocampo, where Antonio S. Sindiong serves as the main architect and Lamberto Un Ocampo as the main engineer of the project, whom was also hired by Jorge L. Araneta for the architectural design of the Farmers Plaza. During its opening in 1976, Ali Mall featured many firsts for a mall in the country, such as the first fully-enclosed integrated mall with multi-level covered parking garage, featuring a spiral driveway accessing all floors; the Alimall Cineplex 2, the first cineplex with two cinemas, which was later upgraded to four theatres; the largest indoor skating rink, known as Skate Town; and the first food court, presently known as the Food Plaza, with its first tenants being Papemelroti, Blue Magic, and Rusty Lopez. During its opening, the mall also hosted a ringside lobby bar, a first class ballroom, and snack bars, while the mall's interiors presents a mixture of greenery with indoor plants and landscape installations.

During the 1980s, the mall underwent numerous expansions and renovations to cater more retail shops and increase the mall's overall floor area. However, due to the political uncertainties due to the coup attempts against Corazon Aquino from the late 1980s, as well as market driven factors due to the fierce competition from constant rise of other large shopping malls within Metro Manila within the 1990s to the early 2000s, the mall faced hurdles within the competitive mall industry. In October 2009, a new expansion of Ali Mall was opened and the renovation was completed in 2010. The ₱200 million renovation project consisted of a fully enclosed footbridge named the Ali Mall Skywalk that connected Ali Mall to nearby SM Cubao (now SM Araneta City), to commemorate the friendship and history between the two malls, which also featured additional dining restaurants. The renovation also featured new modernized interiors, expanded sidewalks, a modernization of the mall's air conditioning systems, and the Ali Mall Cineplex 4. The mall also featured new revamped sections to cater market demands, such as the former Shoe Center, which opened its doors within the late 2000s, before closing its doors in 2017 to be converted into the Food Lane, completed in early 2018.

In March 2019, a portion of the mall's upper ground floor was renovated to cater novelty items, antiques, art, music, and memorabilia. This section was inaugurated as ALI X (Arts, Lifestyle, and Interests Experience), and "aims to be a haven for casual goers and hobbyists alike". Inaugural tenants included Happy Music, Remnant's Thrift Shop, and Erin's Artist's Lounge and Cafe, among others.

== Features ==
An overlooking view of the Ali Mall atrium (2021)

The mall currently has 64,500 square meters (694,000 sq ft) of retail space, and features environment-friendly air-conditioning and government services facilities. Among its tenants were Automatic Centre, Jollibee, McDonald's, Philippine Airlines, Penshoppe, National Book Store, and more than 100 other shops, including dining, retail, and tech services shops.

The mall also features an events hall atrium at the lower ground floor, and a glass painting of Muhammad Ali named "Alive" by Monica Jane Valerio, which commemorates Ali's victory in Thrilla in Manila, located within the atrium at the mall's ground floor.

The mall also features the Ali Mall Cinemas and the Ali Mall Government Center at the third level, where various government offices occupy the area, such as the Department of Foreign Affairs (DFA) has a passport office located on the second level of the mall and opened its doors in February 2014. Following the opening of the DFA office, more government agencies began occupying the Government Center area, located at the mall's second floor and is occupied by Pag-IBIG Fund, the National Bureau of Investigation, the Land Transportation Office, Philippine Postal Corporation, the Food and Drug Administration, the Department of Trade and Industry, the QC Business Center, and the Barangay Socorro Satellite Office.

== Redevelopment plans ==
Plans for the redevelopment of the Ali Mall were laid out as early as 2019, which aims to gentrify the mall and serves as a part of the Araneta City Master Plan, for the complex's Vision 2030 plan. The planned redevelopment project includes the demolition of the northern section of Ali Mall to give way for the expansion and modernization of the mall and for the construction of a 4-tower mixed-use development on the mall's northern area, located along General McArthur Avenue. At present, the proposal is still on the planning stages, as the company prioritizes the development of other properties along the area.

== Popular culture ==
The mall is referenced in Gina Apostol's novel, Insurrecto.

== See also ==
- Araneta City
- Smart Araneta Coliseum
- Gateway Mall
- Muhammad Ali
