= LBC Express =

Philippine courier company

- Type: Public
- Traded as: PSE: LBC
- Industry: Courier
- Founded: 1945; 81 years ago (Luzon Brokerage Corporation)
- Headquarters: Pasay, Philippines
- Area served: Worldwide
- Key people: Enrique V. Rey, Jr. (President and CEO); Rene E. Fuentes (chairman)
- Services: Post delivery, express mail, freight forwarding, third-party logistics, wire transfers, cargo airline, remittance services
- Subsidiaries: LBC Remit Express; LBC Foundation; LBC Sports Development Corporation; LBC Mundial Corporation; LBC Express International Aviation
- Website: lbcexpress.com

LBC Express, Inc. (previously known as Luzon Brokerage Corporation) (PSE: LBC) is a courier company based in the Philippines.

It operates scheduled commercial vehicle cargo services in currently and planned cargo airline services begin on May 31, 2014. As of 2016, LBC has over 1,252 branches in the Philippines, and over 60 branches in the United States and Canada. It also has branches in Hong Kong, Macau, Bahrain, Guam, Australia, Qatar, Israel, Saipan, Brunei, Malaysia, Saudi Arabia, United Kingdom, Austria, Singapore, Malta, Switzerland, Japan, Italy, France, Germany, the United Arab Emirates, Spain, Kuwait, South Korea, the Netherlands and Taiwan.

== History ==
Luzon Brokerage Corporation was founded by Carlos Araneta of the Araneta family in the 1945 as a brokerage and air cargo agent. With the help of his sons Juan Carlos, Santiago, and Fernando, Carlos Araneta expanded their family-owned business into an air cargo agency and later as a forwarding service provider to clients. As a third-party shipping provider, the company is responsible for dispatching shipments via asset-based carriers, and arranges shipment space for their customers. The company continued to expand their logistic services in 1973 and introduced the 24-hour overnight delivery services in the country later on.

In 1985, the first branch of LBC outside the country was established in San Francisco, California, in the United States. Along with the opening of its US-based branch, the company introduced the famous “Balikbayan Box” and their money remittance service to cater to Overseas Filipino Workers (OFW).

The moniker "Hari ng padala" (lit. transl. "King of Delivery") was created by the company in 1990. Products such as Branch Pick-up and Bills Payment were added in 2005, while the more secure mail service for personal documents, loose cargo, and container loads were introduced in 2010. The company also began to target business owners.

=== Advertising controversy ===
The company gained controversy in 2009 for an advertisement depicting a spelling bee where a child spells out the initials "L-B-C" for "remittance", "affordable", and "instant". Then-Education Secretary Jesli Lapus expressed disappointment over the advertisement, and urged the company to pull the commercial which has earned a "negative reaction from public for conveying a wrong message." Expressing concern over television's effects on children, Lapus further stressed that there are alternatives to further develop brand recognition, stating "The method used in this particular LBC advertisement may have unintended adverse consequences on the education of young televiewers" and "would certainly not contribute" to the education of young students.

== Branding ==
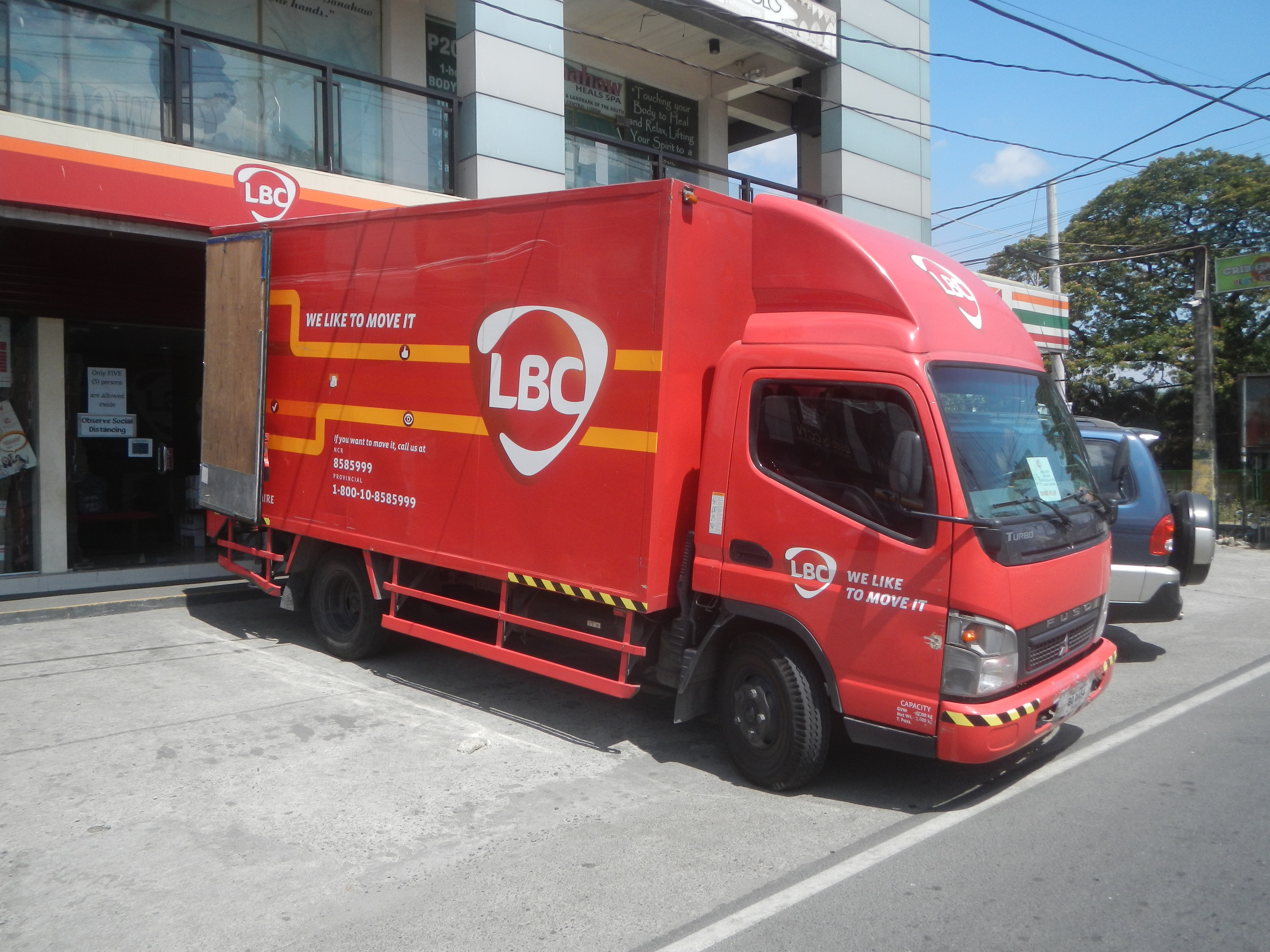
LBC Express truck parked in front of an LBC Express branch in Baliwag, Bulacan

The company silently re-branded in 2013 through the brand consultancy firm, Tangible.

The company has also introduced a new slogan, ‘We like to move it’ – which is inspired by the song "I Like to Move It" by American dance music band Reel 2 Real.

== Sponsorships ==
The company has sponsored various sports events, personalities and teams in the Philippines.

- (Philippines) Kaya F.C.–Iloilo
- (Philippines) J. De Vega Sports Las Piñas
- (Philippines) West Sports Manila
- (Philippines) Talon Dos Lang Malakas Sports
