= Araneta family =

Filipino family

Araneta
- Current region: Negros Island Region and Metro Manila, Philippines
- Etymology: "abundance of valleys"
- Origin: Spain
- Members: Gregorio S. Araneta; J. Amado Araneta; Juan Araneta; Jorge L. Araneta; Salvador Araneta; Jose Miguel Arroyo; Margarita Fores; Liza Araneta Marcos; Mar Roxas; Rafael M. Salas; Jesús Y. Varela

The Araneta family is a Filipino family that originated from Gipuzkoa, the Basque region of northern Spain. The name is derived from the Basque word aran meaning "valley", with the suffix -eta meaning "abundance of", but also a locative term denoting place. In this case, the Araneta name means "the family that comes from the valley".

== History ==
=== Origins ===
In 1723, during the Galleon trade, two brothers named Baltazar de Araneta and Don Jose de Araneta arrived in Manila aboard the Spanish fleet La Sacra Familia. They came from the Basque region of Spain by way of Acapulco, Mexico. However, this was not conclusive as some members of the family disputed that the two are not brothers. Don Jose de Araneta must have been born in Gipuzkoa, but not Baltazar de Araneta; he was born in Mexico.

Baltazar served as a regidor of the cabildo and secretary of the Charitable Fraternity of the Misericordia in Manila. He was married to Manuela de Aguirre and he died in Manila in 1750. One line of the Araneta family is descended from him.

In 1725, Don Jose joined the first Spanish expedition forces to Mindanao. A passage quoted from the book Islas Filipinas: Mindanao (Vol. 11), by Benito Francia and Julian Gonzales Parrado, which was translated into the Chabacano dialect by Datu Michael Mastura, establishes two facts: First, Don Jose de Araneta served the Spanish Politico-Military Government of Mindanao based at Zamboanga City. Second, he served as an interpreter between the Spanish colonial government and the sultan of Maguindanao, together with Placido Alberto de Saavedra. Another passage in the document revealed that in 1746, Don Jose Araneta was executed in Sulugan, Mindanao, nowadays known as Anuling in Cotabato, Philippines. However, there is conflicting information drawn from translations of various documents pertaining to him.

Don Jose Araneta had several sons, two of those, Mathias and Vicente both surnamed Araneta Y Sta. Ana would leave Zamboanga while the others stayed behind. Mathias would settle in Iloilo, while his brother, Vicente would settle in Bago, Negros Occidental starting the prominent Negros branch of the family. He is buried in the old Catholic cemetery of Bago

=== 19th century and the Philippine Revolution ===
In 1823, Buenaventura Araneta, son of Mathias Araneta, became the gobernadorcillo (alcalde naturales) in Molo, Iloilo. He became the first member of the family to enter politics.

In the latter part of the century, a kinsman of his on the Negros side; Juan Araneta was the architect of the Negros Revolution that defeated the Imperial Spanish forces in that island. This would lead to the establishment of the Cantonal Republic of Negros. He would serve as the secretary of war of the short-lived government, which was later absorbed into the American-controlled military government of the Philippines. A statue of him stands in the Bago public plaza. Marciano Soriano Araneta (1866–1940) and Anastacio Soriano Araneta (1870–1898) also participated in combat against the Imperial Spanish forces in Negros and captured the Spanish garrison in Mangkas (now La Carlota City, Negros Occidental).

Other members of the family were involved in the revolution elsewhere. Pablo Soriano Araneta (1864–1943) was the commanding general of the Panay Revolutionary Forces and chief of the expeditionary forces of the Federal Republic of the Visayas (centered on Iloilo City). The eminent Gregorio Soriano Araneta (1869–1930), legal luminary, businessman, nationalist, and patriot, served his country and people under three regimes. He was elected a member of the National Assembly representing Iloilo. In 1898, he was appointed by General Emilio Aguinaldo as secretary-general and delegate to the Malolos Republic. Gregorio Araneta became the secretary of justice of the Philippine Republic on September 26, 1898.

Gregorio also became a successful and prosperous lawyer in Manila and married Dona Carmen Zaragoza y Roxas, of the prominent Spanish mestizo Zaragoza and Roxas clans of Manila, and established the Araneta name in Manila society for the first time.

=== 20th Century to Present Era ===
After the end of the revolution and the creation of the Philippine Commonwealth, members of the clan expanded their business and political interests. Juan Araneta went on to establish the Ma-ao Sugar (refinery) Central in his hometown of Bago, Negros Occidental. Industrialist Jorge Araneta would later expand it, and later the barangay where the Central stood was named after him. Jorge was also a close friend of the Philippine Commonwealth president Manuel Quezon.

It was Jorge's son-in-law and distant relation J. Amado Araneta who made the family into a household name. He established the real estate empire of commercial Cubao. His most prominent achievement is building the Araneta City. Its landmark structure, the Smart Araneta Coliseum, was the world's largest indoor stadium. It still remains one of the largest in Asia. Meanwhile, Amado's son, Jorge L. Araneta, replaced him as the head of the Araneta Group.

== The Araneta Group ==
Araneta Group

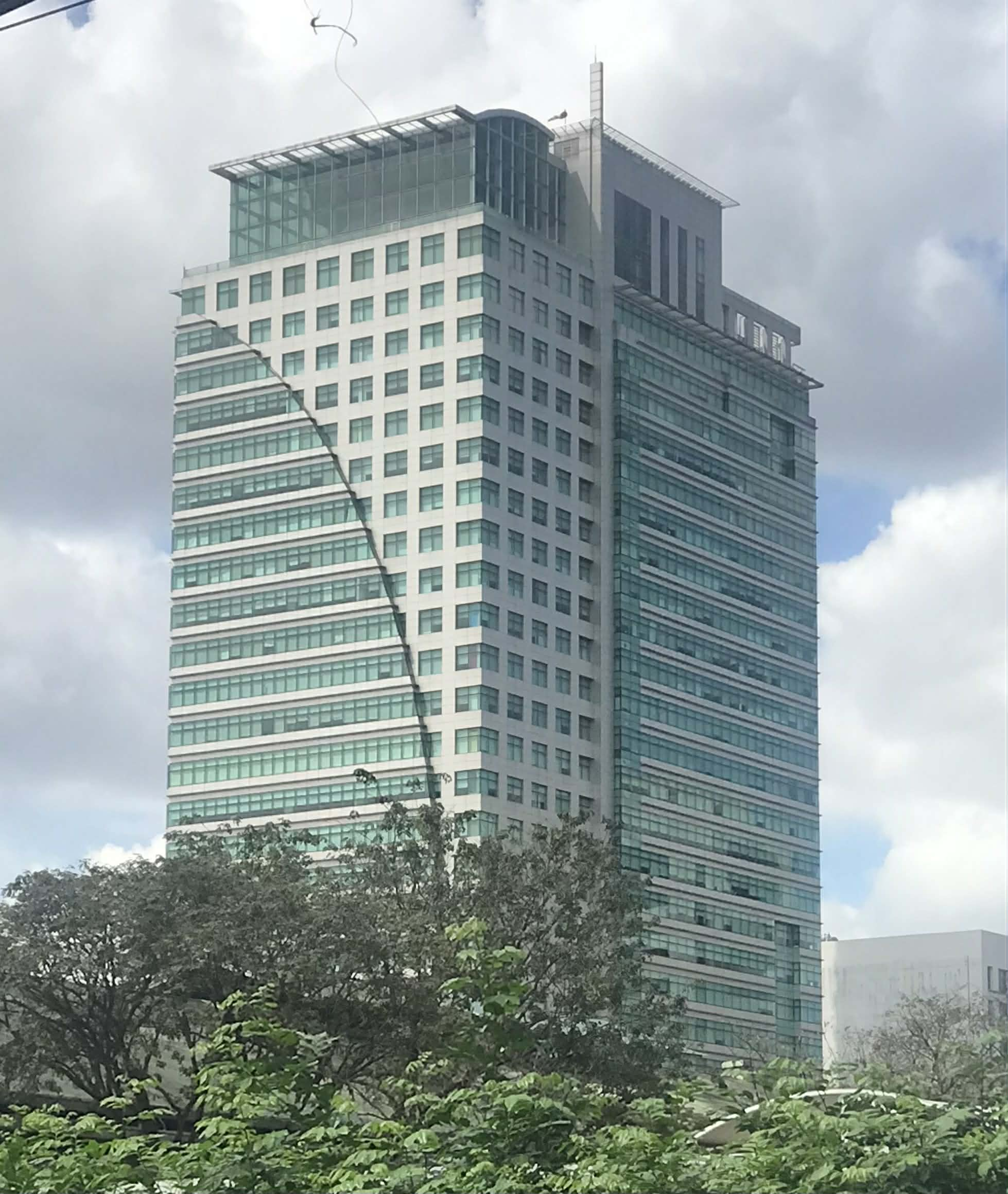
- Gateway Tower, site of the headquarters of the Araneta Group
- Type: Private & Diversified
- Industry: Real estate Investment; Leisure & Entertainment; Restaurants; Hospitality
- Founded: Binondo, Manila; 1954; 72 years ago
- Founder: J. Amado Araneta
- Headquarters: Gateway Tower, Araneta City, Quezon City, Philippines
- Area served: Philippines
- Key people: Jorge L. Araneta (President, Chairman & CEO); Manuel A. Roxas (President, Progressive Development Corporation); Rinfredo B. Dela Cruz (COO, Araneta City, Inc.; EVP, Progressive Development Corporation); Liza Leah Calma-Juinio (COO, Philippine Pizza Inc.); Irene L. José (COO, United Promotions Inc.); Maria A. Manlulu-Garcia (General Manager, Araneta Hotels, Inc.); Christine Diane Romero (Executive Director, J. Amado Araneta Foundation)
- Owner: Araneta Family
- Number of employees: 12,000
- Subsidiaries: 5
- Website: www.aranetagroup.com/index.php

The Araneta Group is a private and diversified company established owned by the Araneta Family since 1954 that holds the key businesses established by J. Amado Araneta. During Amado's leadership, he expanded the family's real estate businesses, farmlands, and sugar plantations. The company is currently owned by Amado's son, Jorge L. Araneta since 1970, and presently owns, operates and invests in real estate development, investments, leisure & entertainment, fast food restaurant franchises, and Hospitality businesses.

=== History ===
The Araneta Group began its operations in 1908 as a diversified company, until the company's ownership was transferred to J. Amado Araneta, with interests in real estate and agriculture sectors, particularly in the sugar plantations industry. As the family's sugar plantations in Negros Island continue to grow during the country's recovery from World War 2, Amado purchased 4 hectares (9.9 acres) of land, located within Highway 54 (now EDSA), Aurora Boulevard, and P. Tuazon Boulevard, from the Radio Corporation of America (RCA) in 1954, and purchased the remaining 31 hectares (77 acres) a year later. Amado merged his companies in 1954 and began his real estate developments in the area in 1956, as he sold a portion of the property to the Philippine National Bank, for the company to set up a branch within while maintaining ownership on the property's land, and later erected the first Aguinaldo Department Store beyond Manila, while relocating his company's offices to the area. In 1957, Amado launched one of his largest projects, the Araneta Coliseum and was completed in 1960. Since then, Amado inaugurated many buildings in the complex, such as the Araneta Enterprise Building in 1956, the New Frontier Theater in 1967, and the Coliseum Farmers Market and Shopping Center in 1969.

As time grew by, Amado expanded his business until his retirement in 1970, when his son, Jorge L. Araneta took helm of his company and his businesses. Since then, the company expanded its interests and investments from real estate, agriculture, investments and entertainment to fast food restaurant franchises in the 1970s, after the purchase of franchising rights of Pizza Hut, and lodging sectors, after the grand opening of the Novotel Manila Araneta City in 2015. Correspondingly, the company is regarded as one of the pioneers of the country's entertainment and leisure development sectors, and serves as one of the biggest private conglomerates in the country.

=== Subsidiaries ===
==== Araneta City, Inc. ====
Araneta City, Inc. (ACI) is the owner, developer, and manager of Araneta City complex in Cubao, Quezon City. It was founded in 1960 after the opening of the Araneta Coliseum. The area serves over 1 million people daily.

ACI's developments also include Manhattan Gardens, a ₱15 billion, 9,000 unit, 18-tower joint venture residential project with Megaworld Corporation occupying 5.7 hectares (14 acres) of the Araneta City, consisting of 4 phases, known as the Manhattan Parkway, Manhattan Parkview, Manhattan Heights, and the Manhattan Plaza. The project is also the first transit-oriented residential development in the country.

==== Araneta Hotels, Inc. ====
Araneta Hotels, Inc. (AHI) is the Group's hotel development arm and serves as the owner and developer of Novotel Manila Araneta City, the first Novotel brand of AccorHotels in the Philippines, and the Ibis Styles Araneta City, the first Ibis Styles brand in the Philippines.

==== PPI Holdings, Inc. ====
PPI Holdings, Inc. (formerly Philippine Pizza, Inc.) is the sole franchise owner of Pizza Hut, Taco Bell, and Dairy Queen in the Philippines, operating over 300 restaurants nationwide.

==== Progressive Development Corporation ====
Progressive Development Corporation (PDC) manages investments and property assets of the Araneta Group outside of the three strategic business units (Araneta Center, Philippine Pizza Inc., and Uniprom).

The subsidiary holds a total of 2,150 hectares (5,300 acres) in its land bank and its major properties are located in San Mateo, Rizal, Rodriguez, Rizal and Bacolod, where the company is involved in the development of The Upper East, a 34-hectare (84-acre) joint development project between the Araneta Group and the Megaworld Corporation. The San Mateo, Rizal property has a total area of 510 hectares (1,300 acres) and is ideal for mixed-use community developments, while its Rodriguez, Rizal property has an area of 1,640 hectares (4,100 acres), and is suited for both housing and light industrial purposes.

Other assets include holdings in Atok Big-Wedge, a listed mining holding company; investments in Wenphil and Philippine Seven, local franchisees of world-renowned brands Wendy's and 7-Eleven respectively; The Peninsula Manila luxury hotel, and tertiary hospital Makati Medical Center, both located within the Makati Central Business District. The PDC is also a business incubator for new ventures.

==== United Promotions, Inc. ====
United Promotions, Inc. (Uniprom) manages the ticketing company TicketNet Online and the leisure and entertainment ventures of the Araneta City (Smart Araneta Coliseum, Kia Theatre, Gateway Mall Cineplex 10 and Ali Mall Cinemas). Aside from providing venues to notable sports events and local and international shows, Uniprom also produces and promotes internationally acclaimed sports and entertainment shows like the World Slasher Cup, and the annual Binibining Pilipinas beauty pageant. Uniprom has also been involved in a 26-year partnership with the producers of Disney on Ice, which has been held annually at the Smart Araneta Coliseum.

==== Non-profit initiatives ====
- J. Amado Araneta Foundation (JAAF) – a non-profit, social development arm of the Araneta Group.

== Araneta Properties Inc. ==
Araneta Properties Inc. (PSE: ARA) is a publicly listed real estate development company owned by Gregorio María "Greggy" Araneta III, husband of Irene Marcos, and is a separate developer to the Araneta Group. The company has developed the mixed-use developments Colinas Verdes and Altaraza. With land assets primarily in Bulacan and Laoag, Ilocos Norte. it accumulated its San Jose del Monte land bank through the years from various entities, including Rodolfo Cuenca, the Insular Life Assurance Company and BDO Strategic Holdings Incorporated.

== Other Businesses ==
Salvador Z. Araneta founded RFM Corporation (PSE: RFM), which began as a flour miller.

LBC Express, founded as the Luzon Brokerage Corporation, was founded by Carlos "Linggoy" Araneta. The company's current CEO is Miguel Angel A. Camahort.

Ramon Araneta ventured into advertising through Ace Advertising Agency (AAA) (now known as Ace Saatchi & Saatchi, wholly owned by the France-based Publicis group through its Saatchi & Saatchi network of agencies).

Joachim Araneta Durante, standing as the CEO of his own beach resort in Siargao Island and Hotel in Cebu City.

== Politics ==
Salvador Araneta, son of Gregorio Araneta become Secretary of Agriculture of the Philippines in 1954. He was the founder of Araneta University (now De La Salle Araneta University) and FEATI University. Later, his nephew Greggy Araneta married Irene Marcos, the daughter of Philippine President Ferdinand Marcos.

Other members of the clan involved with Marcos was Rafael M. Salas, the son of Ernesto Araneta Salas of Bago, Negros Occidental. He served as Marcos' Executive Secretary from 1966 to 1968. But due to political differences he left this position and later become Under-Secretary-General of the United Nations, and the 1st and longest serving Executive Director of the United Nations Population Fund from 1969 to 1987.

Many other members of the clan also serve in various political positions, including Senator and Cabinet Secretary Mar Roxas, a grandson of J. Amado Araneta.

The Negros Occidental branch of the family is also notable for marrying the holders of the highest positions in the Philippine government which includes, two Presidents, a Vice President, two Speakers of the National Assembly or House of Representatives and even a Chief Justice of the Philippines, namely; former First Gentleman Jose Miguel Arroyo, husband of the 14th President of the Philippines, Gloria Macapagal Arroyo who also served as the Vice President and Speaker of the House of Representatives of the Philippines He is a descendant of Jesusa Araneta Lacson-Arroyo. Then there is current First Lady of the Philippines Liza Araneta Marcos wife of the 17th President of the Philippines, Bongbong Marcos, and Cecilia Araneta sister of J. Amado Araneta who married Jose Yulo, the 2nd Speaker of the National Assembly of the Philippines and the 6th Chief Justice of the Philippines.

In local government in the hometown of the Negros branch of Bago, Negros Occidental it is also worth noting that majority of the Mayors up to the present era are of Araneta descent.

== Religion ==
The Araneta family is also influential in religion, particularly the descendants of Josefa Araneta, also of the Negros branch, which produced the largest numbers of the Catholic clergy within the family. Coincidentally her father Luis Araneta, the son of Vicente Araneta y Sta. Ana was a Catholic priest and the Vicar Forane of Bago. She married Gregorio Varela a co-founder of their hometown Bago, Negros Occidental, and the line of their son Antonio Araneta-Varela has produced three nuns, two priests, and a Catholic Prelate Jesus Varela who became the first sitting Bishop of the Diocese of Ozamis and was the longest serving Bishop of the Diocese of Sorsogon. Meanwhile, their daughter, Dolores Araneta Varela, who married Agaton Ramos, had a grandson named Rolando Ramos Dizon, who became a La Sallian Catholic brother before becoming Chairman of the Commission on Higher Education.

As a further sign of their ties to the Catholic church, descendants of Antonio Araneta Varela also maintain a 100 year old Catholic tradition in their hometown of Bago, where they prepare the family's century old image of the Risen Christ or Jesus' Resurrection for procession on Easter Sunday, called Sugata in their native Hiligaynon, or other wise known as Salubong in Tagalog. After Easter the antique image of the Risen Christ is permanently displayed at the family ancestral home named after Antonio Araneta Varela at Bago, Negros Occidental.

== Entertainment ==
A few Araneta descendants have also made a mark in the world of popular entertainment, there are actors in film and television; Chuckie Dreyfus and his cousin, Migo Dreyfus Adecer. They are descended from Frenchman Carlo Dreyfus, a former Mayor of Bago, Negros Occidental who married Elisa Araneta, a daughter of General Juan Araneta. Another famous celebrity in the clan is former TV host and commercial model, Bianca Araneta-Elizalde. From the Zamboanga branch there is actress Camille Canlas and singer Chris Cayzer.

=== Depictions in Film ===
A few members of the Araneta clan have been portrayed in mainstream Philippine cinema. In the 2022 historical period filipino film, Maid in Malacañang actor Kyle Velino played Greggy Araneta, husband of Irene Marcos. His uncle Fr. Fritz Araneta was also briefly portrayed in the film in one scene. Kyle Velino would also play Greggy Araneta in the 2023 film Martyr or Murderer, which is the second installment of a planned trilogy about the Marcos family starting with Maid in Malacañang.

In another movie released in 2022 Mamasapano: Now It Can Be Told, a historical action film, actor Juan Rodrigo played former Secretary of the Interior and local government of the Philippines, Manuel “Mar” Araneta Roxas II.

== Notable Members ==
=== Business ===
- Dino Araneta – former president and chief strategy officer of LBC Express Holdings, Inc. and founder of Quad X.
- Gregorio María "Greggy" Araneta III – current chairman of Philweb (PSE: WEB); chairman, president, and CEO of Araneta Properties Inc. (ARA) (PSE: ARA); president of Araza Resources Corporation, Envirotest Corporation, Enviroclean Corporation and Carmel Farms Inc.; chairman of Autobus Transport Systems Inc. (Autobus), Gregorio Araneta Management Corporation, Gregorio Araneta Inc. (GAI), Gamma Holdings Corporation, Carmel Development Corporation and Gamma Properties Inc.; he held various executive positions to the following companies: ISM Communications Corporation (ISM), Atok-Big Wedge Company Inc. (Atok) (PSE: AB), Alphaland Corporation (ALPHA), LBC Development Bank (LBC Bank) (PSE: LBC), and Asia International Travel Corporation; married to Irene Marcos, daughter of Ferdinand Marcos and Imelda Marcos.
- J. Amado Araneta – founder of the Araneta Group of Companies, which developed the Araneta City in Cubao, Quezon City. He was the original owner of Bacolod-Murcia Milling Company located in Bacolod.
- Jorge Araneta – industrialist; owned and expanded some local sugar mills in Bago, Negros Occidental.
- Jorge L. Araneta - Chairman and CEO of The Araneta Group, ranked as the 47th richest person in the Philippines by Forbes Magazine on 2021 with a net worth of $215 million USD.
- Santiago "Santi" G. Araneta – former chairman and CEO of LBC Express Holdings, Inc. (PSE: LBC).
- José María "Joey" A. Concepcion III – incumbent president and CEO of RFM Corporation (PSE: RFM), director of Concepcion Industrial and founder of Go Negosyo, a non-profit organization that aims to reduce poverty in the country by encouraging entrepreneurship and related support systems; Presidential Adviser for Entrepreneurship of the Duterte Administration, son of José S. Concepcion Jr. and Victoria L. Araneta; Padma Shri recipient (2018). Ranked as the 49th richest person in the Philippines for 2026 by Forbes Magazine with a networth of $200 million USD
- Margarita A. Forés – celebrity chef and businesswoman in Manila; owner of 10 Italian-inspired restaurants including Cibo, Pepato, Café Bola, and Pepato; other businesses include Fiori di M and Casa di M, high-end floral and housewares design, respectively, and the Cibo d M catering arm; daughter of María Lourdes "Baby" Araneta-Forés and a granddaughter of J. Amado Araneta. . .
- Judy Araneta-Roxas (Note: Date of birth: July 31, 1934 Date of death: August 26, 2025) – daughter of J. Amado Araneta; chairperson of the Gerry Roxas Foundation; vice-chair of the Araneta Group.

=== Culture, Entertainment and Media ===
- Migo Dreyfus Adecer - Television actor, descendant of Elisa Araneta-Dreyfus
- Bianca Araneta-Elizalde – Television host, commercial model
- Maria Lina Araneta-Santiago – daughter of Salvador Araneta, granddaughter of Gregorio S. Araneta and Carmen Zaragoza y Roxas; author of Araneta: A Love Affair With God and Country, columnist in Manila Standard (1993–1997), composer, poet, environmentalist, and co-founder of Holy Eucharistic Mass Action (H.E.M.A.) for EJK victims and their families; family historian for the Lopez, Araneta, and Roxas families.
- Camille Canlas - Actress
- Chris Araneta Cayzer - Singer, Actor, The X Factor Australia Top 6 Finalist in the over 25 category
- Chuckie Dreyfus - Film and television actor, descendant of Elisa Araneta-Dreyfus
- Eduardo Varela Sicangco - Scenic and costume designer for Broadway theatre, Opera, film and television. Great grandson of Antonio Araneta-Varela

=== Government ===
==== United Nations ====
- Rafael M. Salas – United Nations Under-Secretary-General, 1st and Longest serving Executive Director of the United Nations Population Fund, Executive Secretary to Ferdinand Marcos son of Ernesto Araneta Salas.

==== Spouses of Presidents ====
- Rosario Araneta Lacson - First Lady of the Republic of Negros, wife of Aniceto Lacson, the only President of the Republic of Negros, first cousin of Juan Araneta
- Jose Miguel Arroyo – 1st First Gentleman of the Philippines, husband of the 14th President of the Philippines, Gloria Macapagal Arroyo, grandson of Jesusa Araneta Lacson de Arroyo.
- Louise "Liza" Araneta Marcos – lawyer, professor, First Lady of the Philippines, and wife of President Bongbong Marcos.

==== Members of the Cabinet of the Philippines ====
- Gregorio S. Araneta – Secretary of the Malolos Congress, Secretary of Justice under Emilio Aguinaldo
- Salvador Araneta – Secretary of Economic Coordination under president Elpidio Quirino, secretary of agriculture under president Ramon Magsaysay.
- Manuel "Mar" Araneta Roxas II – grandson of J. Amado Araneta and former president Manuel Roxas, son of former senator Gerry Roxas and Judy Araneta; 30th Secretary of the DTI, 38th Secretary of the DOTC, 37th Secretary of the DILG; Senator of the Philippines, 2010 vice-presidential candidate and 2016 presidential candidate.
- Ramon Araneta Torres - 1st Secretary of Labor, 16th Governor of Negros Occidental, Senator of the Philippines
- Toni Yulo-Loyzaga - 33rd Secretary of Environment and Natural Resources, granddaughter of Cecilia Araneta Yulo

==== Undersecretaries, Deputy Ministers, and other Non-Cabinet national officials ====
- Francis Varela - Undersecretary of the Department of Education, great-grandson of Antonio Araneta-Varela
- Jose Y. Varela Jr. - Deputy Minister for Energy, Assemblyman of the Regular Batasang Pambansa for Negros Occidental, grandson of Antonio Araneta-Varela
- Arsenio Yulo Jr.- First Chairman Administrator of the Sugar Regulatory Administration, son of Carmen Araneta Matti-Yulo

==== Members of the House of Representatives of the Philippines ====
- Dato Arroyo - Former member of the House of Representatives of the Philippines for the 2nd district of Camarines Sur, great grandson of Jesusa Araneta Lacson-Arroyo
- Iggy Arroyo - Former member of the House of Representatives of the Philippines for the 5th district of Negros Occidental, great grandson of Jesusa Araneta Lacson-Arroyo
- Gerry "Dinggoy" Araneta Roxas Jr. – Former member of the House of Representatives of the Philippines for the 1st district of Capiz
- Ferdinand Alexander "Sandro" Araneta Marcos III – Senior Deputy Majority Leader of the House of Representatives, eldest son of President Bongbong Marcos and First Lady Liza Araneta Marcos, grandson of Ferdinand Marcos and Imelda Marcos

==== Governors and Vice Governors ====
- Juan Araneta – revolutionary, Gobernador Militar of Negros Occidental, 1st Secretary of War of the Republic of Negros
- Mikey Arroyo - Former member of the House of Representatives of the Philippines 10th Vice Governor of Pampanga
- Gloria Araneta-Esteban - first woman to serve as Vice-Mayor of Bacolod, first woman to serve as Vice-Governor of Negros Occidental
- Isaac Araneta Lacson – 12th governor of Negros Occidental, son of Rosario Araneta Lacson and Gen. Aniceto Lacson, brother of Jesusa Araneta Lacson de Arroyo.
- Cecilia "Cecile" Araneta-Marcos – 28th governor of Ilocos Norte.

==== Municipal Presidents and Mayors ====
- Enrique J. Araneta - 2nd City Mayor of Bago, Negros Occidental
- Mariano Araneta - 7th Municipal President of Bago, Negros Occidental
- Teodoro A Araneta - 8th Municipal Mayor of Bago, Negros Occidental
- Janet Araneta-Espinosa Torres - 6th City Mayor of Bago, Negros Occidental
- Marina Javellana-Yao - 9th City Mayor of Bago, Negros Occidental, granddaughter of Trinidad Palacios Villanueva-Javellana the daughter of Bernardina Araneta Palacios-Villanueva
- Luis Araneta Matti - 1st and 6th Municipal Mayor of Bago, Negros Occidental
- Mariano Varela Ramos - One of the first appointed Municipal President of Bacolod, son of Dolores Araneta Varela
- Manuel Yulo Torres Jr. - Longest serving and 1st and 5th City Mayor of Bago, Negros Occidental, also one of the longest serving Mayors of the Philippines with a tenure of 37 years in office. Son of Manuel Araneta Torres
- Ramon D. Torres - 7th City Mayor of Bago, Negros Occidental, grandson of Manuel Araneta Torres
- Eduardo Varela - 6th City Mayor of Cadiz, Negros Occidental, great grandson of Antonio Araneta-Varela
- Nicholas Yulo - 8th City Mayor of Bago, Negros Occidental, grandson of Carmen Araneta Matti-Yulo
- Jesus Miguel Araneta Yulo - 20th Mayor of Calamba, Laguna, son of Cecilia Sitchon Araneta-Yulo

=== Religion and Academia ===
- Armando "Mando" Araneta Arquiza – former acting president of Western Mindanao State University.
- Fr. Francisco "Fritz" Araneta, SJ – Jesuit priest, former president of Ateneo de Manila University.
- Rolando Ramos Dizon – religious, 18th President of De La Salle University, and 4th Chairperson of the Commission on Higher Education, grandson of Dolores Araneta-Varela.
- Sr. Catalina Varela ICM - Catholic Nun, former directress of Saint Theresa's College of Quezon City, granddaughter of Antonio Araneta Varela
- Sr. Consuelo Varela ICM - Catholic Nun, Anti Martial law activist, smuggled letters out of prison for Senator Ninoy Aquino during the Martial law era, former directress Saint Theresa's College of Quezon City, granddaughter of Antonio Araneta Varela
- Jesús Y. Varela – Catholic Prelate, 1st Bishop of the Diocese of Ozamis, Longest serving and 3rd Bishop of the Diocese of Sorsogon, Chair of the Catholic Bishops Conference of the Philippines’ Commission on Family and Life, grandson of Antonio Araneta Varela.
- Fr. Mariano Varela SJ - Catholic Priest, Jesuit, former Vice President of Xavier University - Ateneo de Cagayan, grandson of Antonio Araneta Varela
- Sr. Natividad Varela OSA - Catholic nun, Augustinian, co-founder of La Consolacion College in Murcia, Negros Occidental, granddaughter of Antonio Araneta Varela
- Fr. Richard Varela SDB - Catholic Priest, Salesian, Former Principal-Administrator Don Bosco Technical Institute of Makati, Vice President of the Philippine Educational Publishers Association, great-grandson of Antonio Araneta Varela

=== Sports ===
- Ian Araneta - former football player for the Philippine national football team
- Manuel L. Araneta Jr. – Basketball player who competed in the 1948 Summer Olympics, father of the First Lady of the Philippines Liza Araneta Marcos
- Mariano V. Araneta – former president of the Philippine Football Federation

=== Notable Spouses ===
- Stella Araneta - the first Miss International, Chair of Binibining Pilipinas, wife of Jorge L. Araneta
- Gemma Cruz-Araneta - writer, director, 10th Secretary of Tourism of the Philippines, wife of Antonio "Tonypet" Araneta
- Aniceto Lacson - President of the Republic of Negros, husband of Rosario Araneta
- Chito Loyzaga - former professional basketball player for the Philippine Basketball Association, husband of Toni Yulo-Loyzaga, the granddaughter of Cecilia Araneta-Yulo
- Gloria Macapagal Arroyo - 14th President of the Philippines, 10th Vice President of the Philippines, 25th Speaker of the House of Representatives of the Philippines, wife of Jose Miguel Arroyo, the grandson of Jesusa Araneta Lacson-Arroyo
- Bongbong Marcos - 17th President of the Philippines, husband of Liza Araneta Marcos
- Irene Marcos - daughter of Ferdinand Marcos the 10th President of the Philippines, wife of Gregorio Maria Araneta III
- Gerry Roxas - former Senator of the Philippines and the son of Manuel Roxas 5th President of the Philippines, husband of Judith 'Judy' Araneta
- Korina Sanchez - Broadcast journalist, television news anchor, field reporter, magazine show host, radio anchor, newspaper columnist, wife of Manuel 'Mar' Araneta-Roxas II
- Jose Yulo - 2nd Speaker of the National Assembly of the Philippines, 6th Chief Justice of the Philippines, 13th and 34th Secretary of Justice of the Philippines, Senator of the Philippines, husband of Cecilia Araneta
- Carmen Zaragoza y Rojas - Early filipina artist, wife of Gregorio S. Araneta

== Places ==
- Angel Araneta Ledesma Ancestral House, Silay, Negros Occidental
- Araneta Center-Cubao station (MRT)
- Araneta Center-Cubao station (LRT)
- Araneta City
- Araneta City Cyberpark
- Araneta City Bus Port
- Araneta Street, Bacolod City
- Barangay Don Jorge L. Araneta, Bago, Negros Occidental
- De La Salle Araneta University
- Gregorio Araneta Avenue, Quezon City
- General Araneta street, Cubao, Quezon City
- General Juan Araneta ancestral house, Bago, Negros Occidental
- General Juan Araneta elementary school, Bago, Negros Occidental
- General Juan Araneta monument, Bago, Negros Occidental
- Smart Araneta Coliseum

== Sources ==
- Alfredo Saulo. (1991). "IV Bago: Birthplace of the Negros Republic". Jorge Vargas Autobiography. University of the Philippine Press.
- Violeta Lopez-Gonzaga. (1994). Land of Hope, Land of Want: A socio-economic history of Negros. Philippine National Historical Society.
- Roland Oscar Araneta. (2009). Familia Araneta.
- Salvador Araneta. https://salvadoraraneta.com/
