= Rafael M. Salas =

Executive Secretary of the Philippines from 1966 to 1969

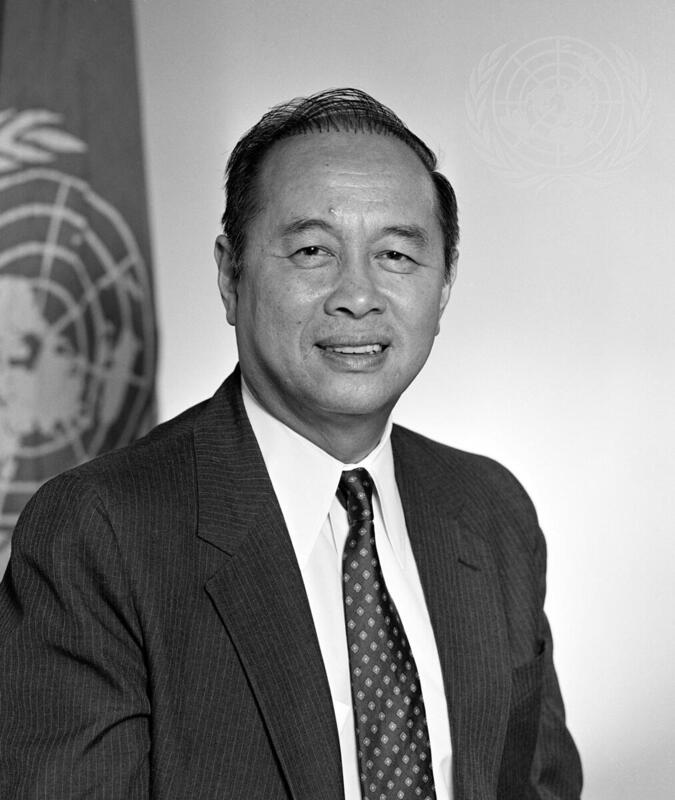
- Official portrait, 1983

16th Executive Secretary of the Philippines
- In office January 1, 1966 – July 24, 1969
- President: Ferdinand Marcos
- Preceded by: Natalio Castillo
- Succeeded by: Ernesto Maceda

Personal details
- Born: Rafael Montinola Salas; August 7, 1928 Bago, Negros Occidental, Philippine Islands
- Died: March 3, 1987 (aged 58) Washington D.C., United States
- Education: University of the Philippines Diliman; Harvard University
- Occupation: Businessman
- Known for: Founding executive director of United Nations Fund for Population

Rafael Montinola Salas (August 7, 1928 – March 3, 1987) was a Filipino, the first head of the United Nations Population Fund. His tenure started at the agency's inception in 1969 and ended with his unexpected death in 1987. Prior to accepting the UN post, Salas served as 16th Executive Secretary to Philippine President Ferdinand Marcos until a falling-out on policy differences prompted his resignation from the Marcos government in 1969.

== Early life ==
Salas was born in Bago, Negros Occidental, Philippines on August 7, 1928, one of three children of Ernesto Araneta Salas and Isabel Neri Montinola. After World War II, Salas went to Manila to continue his education and obtained his B.A. (magna cum laude) from the University of the Philippines Diliman in 1950. Three years later, he completed his law degree (cum laude) from the U.P. College of Law. He then attended Harvard University, where he finished his master's degree in public administration in 1955. He returned to his country and joined the academe at his alma mater, the University of the Philippines as a lecturer in Economics until 1959 when he transferred to the Far Eastern University as a professorial lecturer until 1961. He was rehired by the University of the Philippines as assistant vice president from 1962 to 1963 and then as professorial lecturer of Law and member of the Board of Regents from 1963 to 1966. He is a member of the Pan Xenia Fraternity and one of the Outstanding Pan Xenians recognized in 1973.

== Career ==
By 1966, Salas, also known affectionately as "Paeng," was recruited to a Cabinet position as executive secretary of President Ferdinand E. Marcos. While executive secretary, Salas was named by Marcos as chief action officer of the National Rice Sufficiency Program and was credited for the dramatic increase in rice production whose shortfall perennially plagued the country.

But due to irreconcilable differences with President Ferdinand E. Marcos, he resigned and accepted a position to become the first executive director of the United Nations Fund for Population Activities in 1969 (The agency is now known as the United Nations Population Fund and is led by an undersecretary general). Salas served in this position with efficiency and distinction. (3)

As a UN official, he was well respected as a morally upright leader (3) and for his dedication to the advancement of the UN population programs. An article entitled "Knowing the Man and the Award" and published by the Commission on Population of the Philippines (POPCOM) cited Salas as "widely known as 'Mr. Population' in the international population community. He brought together more developed and less developed countries, helping them to become aware of the extent to which they share an interest in population and development." (1) For his contributions to the global understanding of population, Salas received 30 honorary degrees, honorary professorships, and academic awards from higher academic institutions in 25 countries.(3)

Besides his role as an international public servant, Salas was also a poet and author. He contributed articles to international magazines and newspapers drawing on his writing skills as past editor of the Philippine Law Journal. He died on March 3, 1987, in Washington, DC from an apparent heart attack as he prepared to return to the Philippines shortly after the restoration of democracy in the People Power Revolution of 1986 that swept Marcos out of power. It was speculated at the time of his death that Salas would make a run for the presidency of the Philippines.

== Special citations ==
In his honor, POPCOM created in 1990 what has evolved into a yearly prestigious award: The Rafael M. Salas Population and Development Award (RMSPDA). It aims to perpetuate his legacy by recognizing local government units, individuals and institutions for their outstanding achievements and contributions to population management programs. (1) It also seeks to recognize individuals and institutions who continuously pursue the ideals and visions of Salas to "achieve a better world for the present and future generations." (1)

Also instituted in his honor is the annual Rafael M. Salas Memorial Lecture at the UN headquarters in New York. The lecture series began as a memorial and tribute to Salas under whose "leadership, the UNFPA grew from a small trust fund to the world's largest multilateral provider of population assistance." (4) Past speakers include former World Bank president Robert McNamara, former Norwegian Prime Minister Gro Harlem Brundtland, former Philippine President Fidel Ramos, Baroness Chalker of Wallasey, Prince Philip the Duke of Edinburgh, and famed marine biologist Jacques-Yves Cousteau.

=== Citations, titles, positions of Rafael M. Salas: (2) ===
- Professorial Lecturer of Economics & Law, 1955–66
- Asst. Vice President of the University of Phil. 1962–63
- Member of the Board of Regents, 1966–69
- Executive Secretary of the Republic of the Phils. 1966–69
- Executive Director of the United Nations Fund for Population Activities, 1969–87
- Honorary professor at Universidad Nacional Experimental Simon Rodriguez, 1979
- People's University of China, 1980
- Universidad Autonoma de Santo Domingo, 1981
- Universidad Central del Ecuador, 1982
- Pontificia Universidad Catolica del Ecuador, 1982
- Moscow State University, 1982
- United Nations, delegate to the General Assembly, 1968
- Vice-president of International Conference on Human Rights, 1968
- Senior Consultant to Administrator of Development Programme, 1969
- Assistant Secretary General, 1971–72
- Under Secretary General of the United Nations Fund, beginning in 1973
- Coordinator of World Population Year, 1974
- Secretary General of International Conference on Population, 1984.
- Presidential Consultative Council of Students, 1954
- Member of National Economic Council, 1955–61
- Special Assist. to the Secretary of Agriculture and Natural Resources and to the President of the Republic, 1961
- Acting Chair of National Economic Council, 1966 and 1968
- National Coordinator and Action Officer in National Rice and Corn Sufficiency Programme (the "Green Revolution"), 1967–69.
- Special assignments with the government included delegate to UNESCO Conference on media and youth, 1952
- Executive Secretary of UNESCO National Commission of the Philippines, 1957
- Assistant Secretary General of Second Asian Productivity Conference, 1960
- Chair of Board of Trustees of Government Service Insurance System, 1966
- Chair of Administrative Code Revision Committee, 1966
- Member of Official Philippine state visit to Japan and Philippine delegation to Manila Summit Conference, both 1966
- "Ambassador Extraordinary" to Indonesia, 1967
- Chair of Presidential School Building Committee, 1967
- Chair of International Tourist Year for the Philippines, 1967
- Member of the Board of Governors of the Philippine National Red Cross, 1967–69
- Chair of National Committee on Disaster Operations, 1966–69
- Chair of Reorganization Commission, 1968–69
- General manager of Manila Chronicle and assistant to the President of Meralco Securities Corp., both 1963–66.

=== Honorary degrees include: (2) ===
- D.Humanities from Central Mindanao University, 1969
- PhD from Far Eastern University, 1969
- University of Sarajevo, 1981
- LL.D. from Sri Venkateswara University, 1975
- University of North Carolina at Chapel Hill, 1978
- University of Malaya and University of Colombo, 1979
- University of Wales, 1981
- Islamabad Quaid-i-Azam University, 1982
- University of the Philippines, 1983
- D.Soc.Sc. from University of Cairo, 1978
- University of Indonesia, 1981
- D.P.A. from Yonsei University, 1978
- D.Econ. from Nihon University, 1979
- D.H.C. from Universidad Mayor de San Simon and Universidad Nacional Federico Villareal, both 1979
- D.Pol.Sc. from Chulalongkorn University, 1980
- D.Public Service from University of Maryland at College Park, 1980
- George Washington University, 1981
- L.H.D. from American College of Switzerland, 1981

=== Other honours ===
- Management Man of the Year Award from Management Association of the Philippines, 1966
- named Outstanding Management Practitioner of the Year by the Management Practitioners Association of the Philippines, 1967
- named Man of the Year by Asia Weekly Examiner, 1967
- Indonesian Order of Mahaputra, 1968
- Knight Grand Cross (First Class) of the Order of the White Elephant (Thailand), 1968
- Panglima Mangku Negara of Malaysia, 1968
- nominated for the Nobel Peace Prize by José Figueres Ferrer, President of Costa Rica, 1974.
- named Diplomat of the Year by the editorial board of Diplomatic World Bulletin, 1976
- Order of Scientific Merit, first class, from Romania's Academy of Social and Political Sciences, 1980

=== Books written by Rafael M. Salas ===
- People: An International Choice; The Multilateral Approach to Population, Pergamon, 1976.
- International Population Assistance: The First Decade; A Look at the Concepts and Policies Which
- Have Guided the UNFPA in Its First Ten Years, Pergamon, 1979.
- More Than the Grains: Participatory Management in the Philippines Rice Management Program, 1967–1969, Simul Press (Tokyo Press, Japan), 1985.
- Population: Conflict to Census, United Nations Population Fund (New York, NY), 2000.
- Reflections on Population, Pergamon, 1984, 2nd edition, 1985.
- The Far East and Australasia: A Survey and Directory of Asia and the Pacific, Europa, 1981
- The International Who' Who, 50th edition, Europa, 1986.

=== Poems ===
- Fifty-Six Stones, Weatherhill, 1985.
- Footprints, Weatherhill (New York, NY), 1986.

== See also ==
- Philippine Center
