= Araneta Properties =

Philippine real estate company

Araneta Properties Inc.
- Company type: Public
- Traded as: PSE: ARA
- Founders: Gregorio Maria Araneta III
- Headquarters: 21/F Citibank Tower, Paseo de Roxas cor. Valero St., Salcedo Village, Makati, Philippines
- Area served: Philippines
- Website: www.aranetaproperties.com

Araneta Properties Inc. is a publicly listed real estate company involved in real estate development headed by Gregorio Maria Araneta III, a member of the Araneta family.

== History ==
The Araneta Properties Inc. was originally incorporated as Integrated Chrome Corporation (INCHROME) on June 15, 1988, with operations involving in Ferrochrome and Chromite smelting. The company stopped its operations in January 1966, and changed its name to Araneta Properties Inc., with the business focusing more on real estate while maintaining its smelting operations.

The Araneta Properties Inc., along with Sta. Lucia Land Inc. signed a joint venture project in developing the Colinas Verdes Estates, a 230 hectares (570 acres) estates in 2003, involving housing developments and a golf course. In November 2019, Araneta and Sta. Lucia announced an additional 58 hectares (140 acres) expansion project. The company is also involved in the development of Altaraza, a 120 hectares (300 acres) residential and commercial venture with Ayala Land, both located at San Jose del Monte, Bulacan. The company now aims to develop a 140 hectares (350 acres) new financial district in Caloocan, near the MRT 7 project.

On February 21, 2024, Luis Marcos Araneta, husband of Alexandra Rocha is the new president of Araneta Properties Incorporated and Gregorio Araneta III group of companies after resignation of Crisanto Roy Alcid.
