= J. Amado Araneta =

Filipino businessman

- Born: Jesús Amado Sitchon Araneta; February 26, 1907; Bago, Negros Occidental, Insular Government of the Philippine Islands
- Died: November 17, 1985 (aged 78); New York City, US
- Education: University of the Philippines Manila (BSBA)
- Occupations: Businessman; Philanthropist
- Known for: Araneta Center; Bacolod Murcia Milling Company
- Spouse: Ester Bustamante Araneta-Araneta
- Children: 3, including Jorge
- Parent(s): Marciano Yulo Araneta (father); Natividad Sitchon (mother)

Jesús Amado "Amading" Sitchon Araneta (February 26, 1907 – November 17, 1985) was a Filipino businessman. He was initially involved in sugar plantations, but invested in commercial real estate following the Second World War. He is best known for the development of the Araneta Center in Quezon City and for his influence in the Philippines both before and after the Second World War.

== Career ==
Araneta was born on February 26, 1907, at Bago, Negros Occidental, as the fourth of ten siblings. He finished primary and high school at the De La Salle University in Manila and graduated from the University of the Philippines Manila in 1930 with a Bachelor of Science in Business Administration (BSBA). He also helped fund the yearbook "Philippinesian" and "The Literary Apprentice" magazine. After graduating, he entered many business ventures, ranging from sugar planting, mining, retail and real estate development, newspaper and magazine publishing, logging, investments, stocks, and sports promotions. He was also involved in other ventures such as in oil processing, perfumery, film production, and jute sack processing companies.

With his business initially involvement in sugar plantations, Araneta changed Filipino cultural awareness in the 1930s, when he purchased two American television stations and begun broadcasting local content for the first time.

During the Second World War, he secretly supported the independence movement from the Empire of Japan and became involved in funding the war efforts. After the war, and the independence of the Philippines, Araneta began to diversify his holdings and contributed to the recovery of the country. He purchased three mills on the island of Negros and began to heavily invest in commercial real estate. He was influential in the Philippine government, acting as an informal adviser to President Manuel Roxas. He encouraged Roxas to fund the construction of the Negros mills and restore them to the same order they were in prior to the war, and in the two year leadership prior to Roxas' death, the president favoured the sugar barons such as Araneta. At the time, Araneta was acting as the main funding source for Roxas' Liberal Party. He also served as a major adviser to Presidents Sergio Osmeña, Elpidio Quirino, Ramón Magsaysay and Carlos P. García. His elder daughter Judith "Judy" Araneta would later marry the President's son Gerry Roxas.

One of Araneta's most well known projects is the development of the area known as the Araneta Center in Quezon City, east of Manila, with the Araneta Coliseum at its heart. He purchased the land in 1952, which at the time contained a series of radio towers, with the idea that there would be a series of landmark buildings in the area. He had identified the area as being at the crossroads of Cubao, where city people would pass daily but was underdeveloped. He began the construction of the Coliseum in 1957, and was completed in 1959 as then the largest indoor stadium in the world. It opened on 16 March 1960, hosting the boxing card featuring the main event bout between Gabriel Elorde and Harold Gomes.

He also served as a mentor to many well-known people in the country, ranging from writers, diplomats and politicians, including Carlos P. Rómulo, Mauro Méndez, Salvador P. López, Emmanuel Peláez, Vicente Albano Pacis, Arturo Tolentino, Modesto Farolan, and Hermenegildo Atienza, among others.

== Exile ==
Following the 1973 Constitution of the Philippines and the paramilitary style rule of the new government under Ferdinand Marcos, Araneta took himself and his family out of the country. He resided in New York City until his death. While in exile, his businesses in the Philippines were controlled remotely.

== Death ==
Araneta died on November 17, 1985, three months prior to the fall of the regime which had led to his political exile.

His family brought his remains back to Manila and are buried in the family mausoleum at the Loyola Memorial Park, in Marikina, alongside his wife Ester A. Araneta, and his relatives Jorge Araneta, Amparo V. Araneta, daughter of Atanacio Bustamante and Anacleta Montilla Bustamante, Luisito A. Roxas, Anacleta Bustamante. His daughters Judy A. Roxas and Maria Lourdes A. Fores, granddaughter Margarita Fores and Judy's son-in-law Augusto I. Ojeda are also buried there. Remains of Gerardo Roxas and Gerardo Roxas Jr., who are buried at the Manila North Cemetery, are also reinterred therein.

== Awards ==
- Industrialist of the Year (1947), Businessman of the Year (1948), and Sugarman of the Year (1948), by the Business Writers' Association of the Philippines.

== Legacy ==
He married Ester Bustamante Araneta, a distant relation, and they had three children: Judy Araneta-Roxas, Jorge L. Araneta, and María Lourdes "Baby" Araneta-Forés. His son Jorge succeeded him as the head of the Araneta Group of Companies.

His descendants have gone on to be successful in a variety of professions. His granddaughter Margarita Forés was named the best female chef in Asia in 2016. His grandson Mar Roxas ran for president as the Liberal Party candidate at the 2016 Philippine presidential election, which he lost to Rodrigo Duterte.

Araneta's lasting legacy, "The cause of democracy and freedom" is inscribed in Gregorio del Pilar's tomb marker dedicated to Alejo Santos at Malolos City Provincial Capitol.

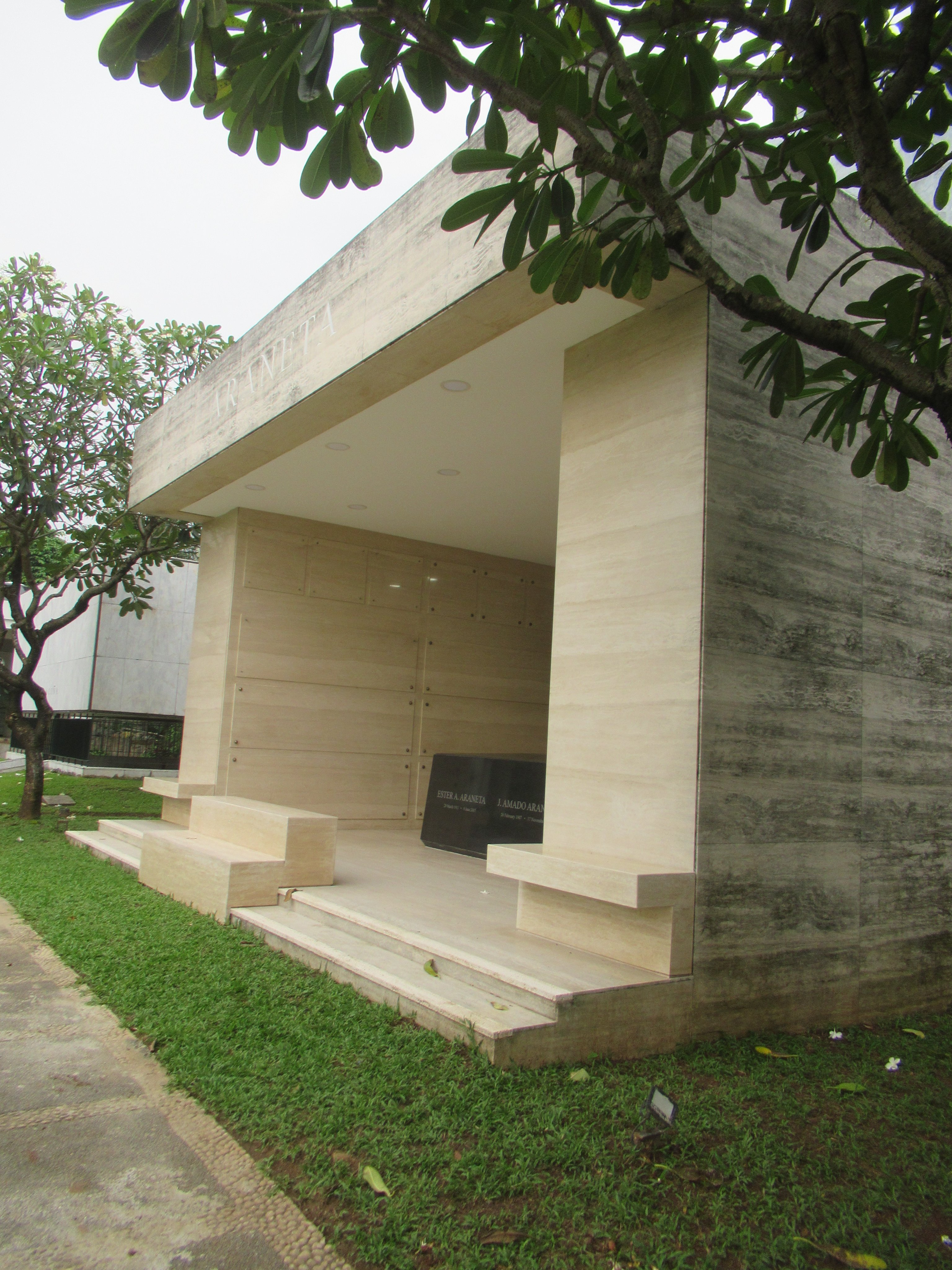
Loyola Memorial Park Araneta mausoleum

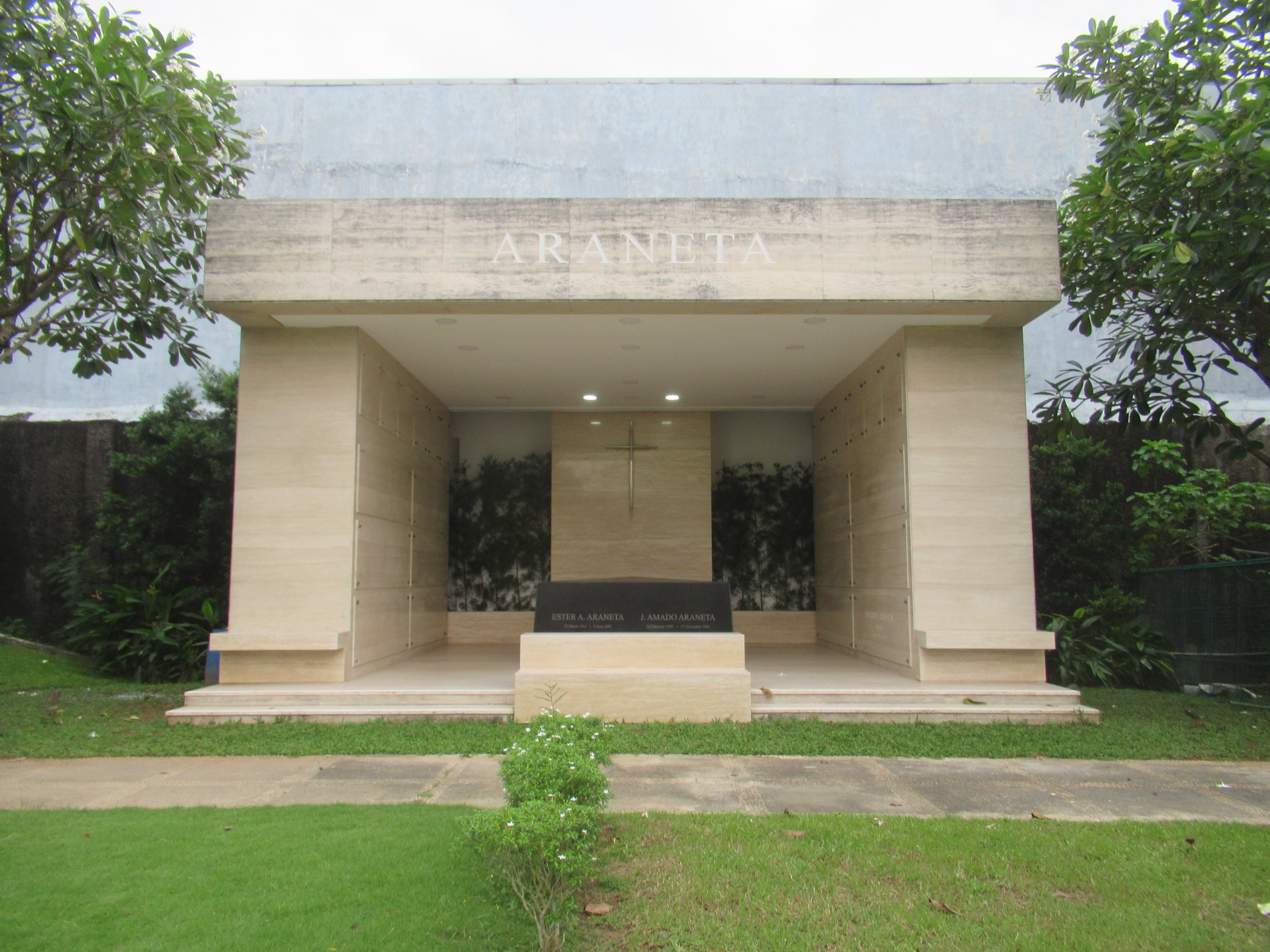
Family graves

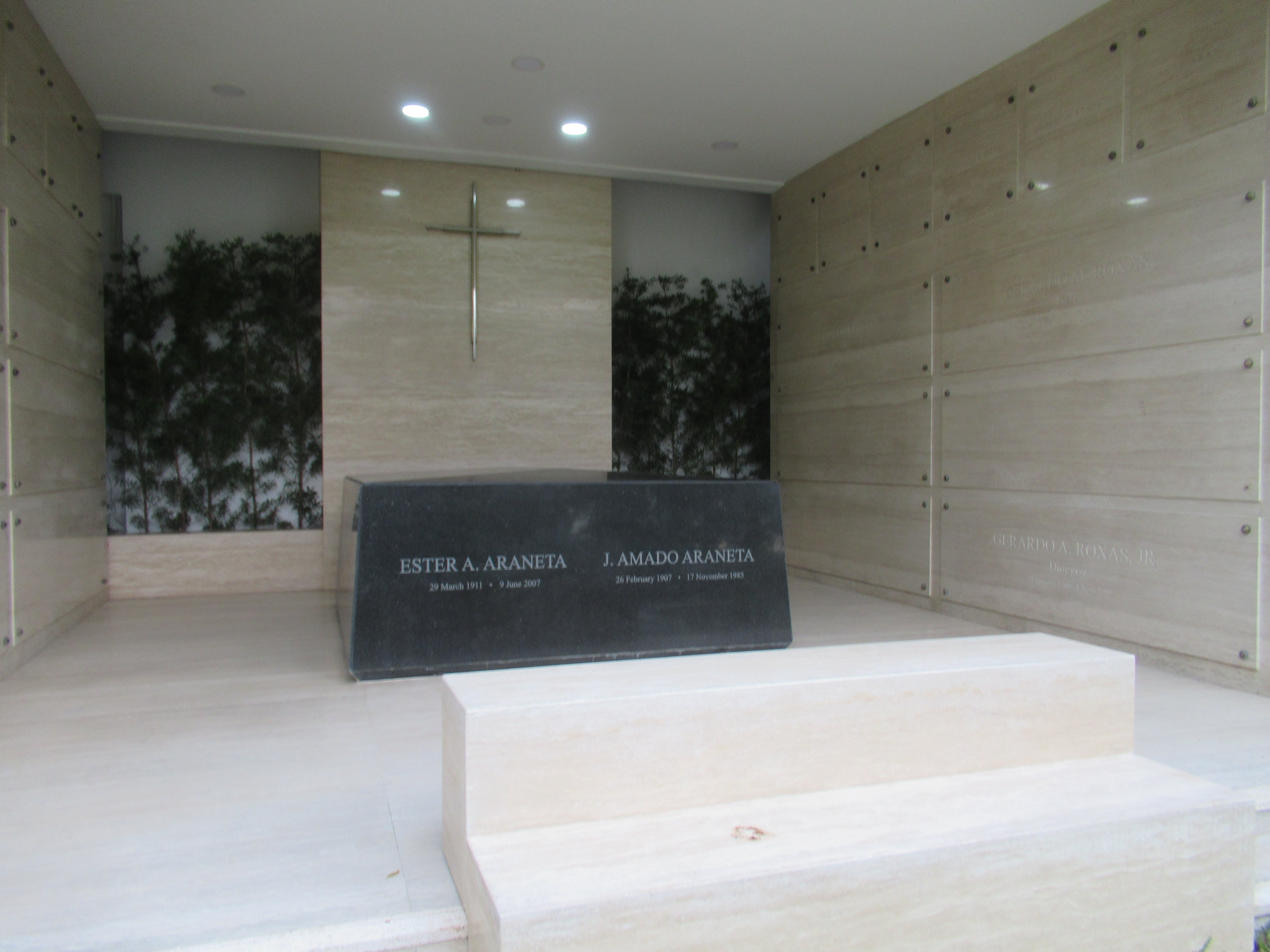
J. Amado-Ester A. Araneta tombs

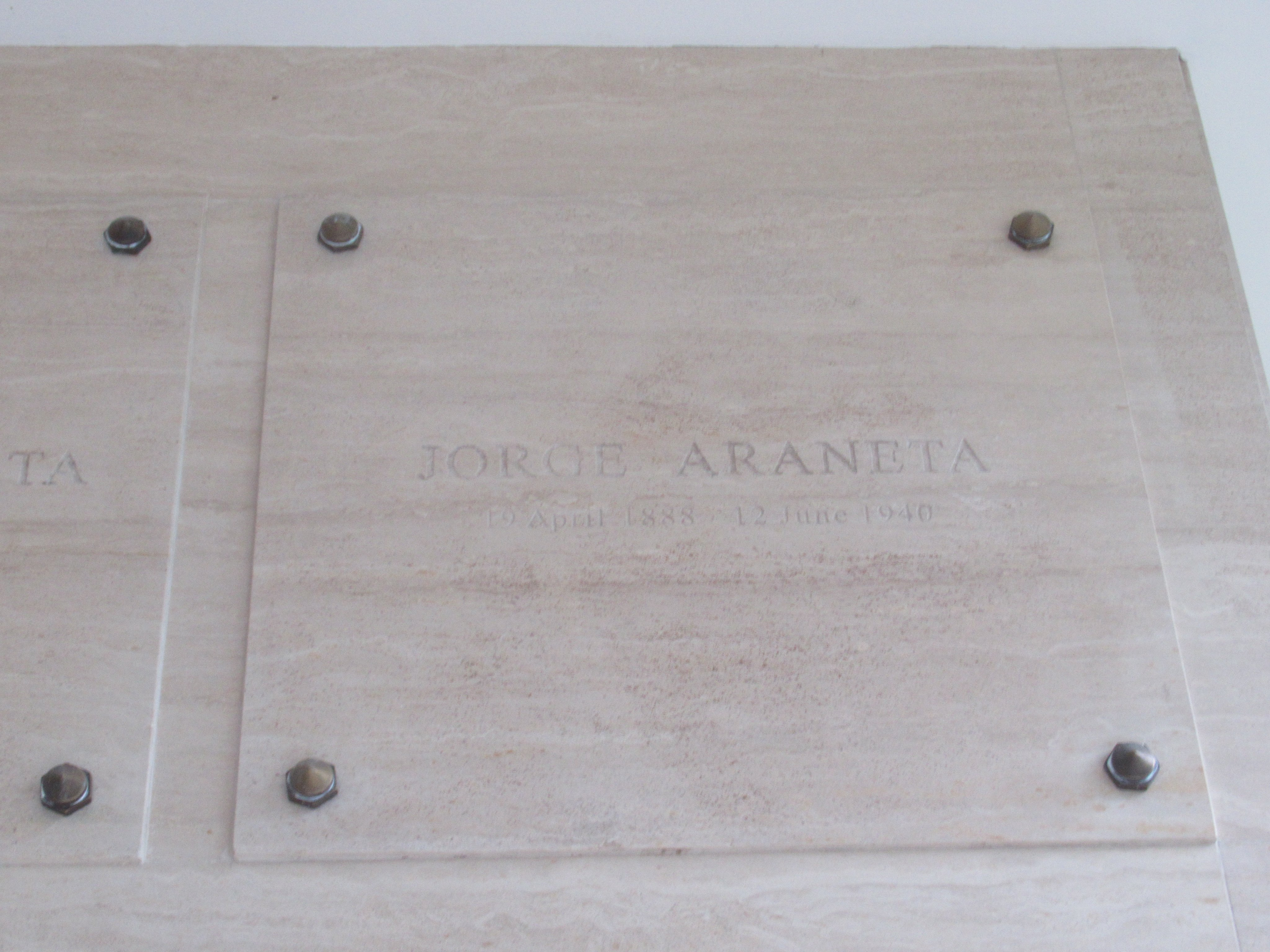
Jorge Araneta (19 April 1888 – 12 June 1940) Cenotaph

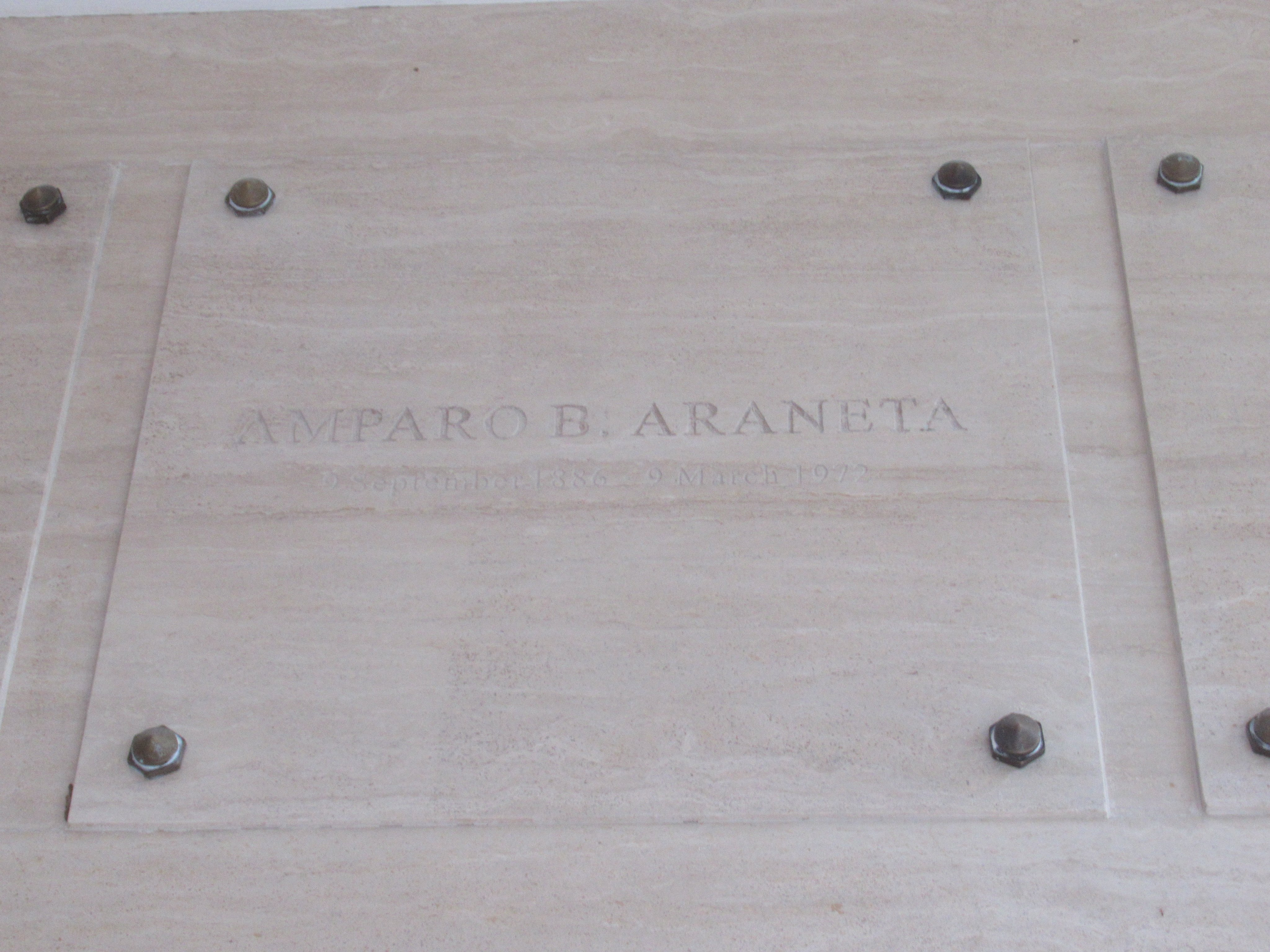
Amparo V. Araneta Cenotaph

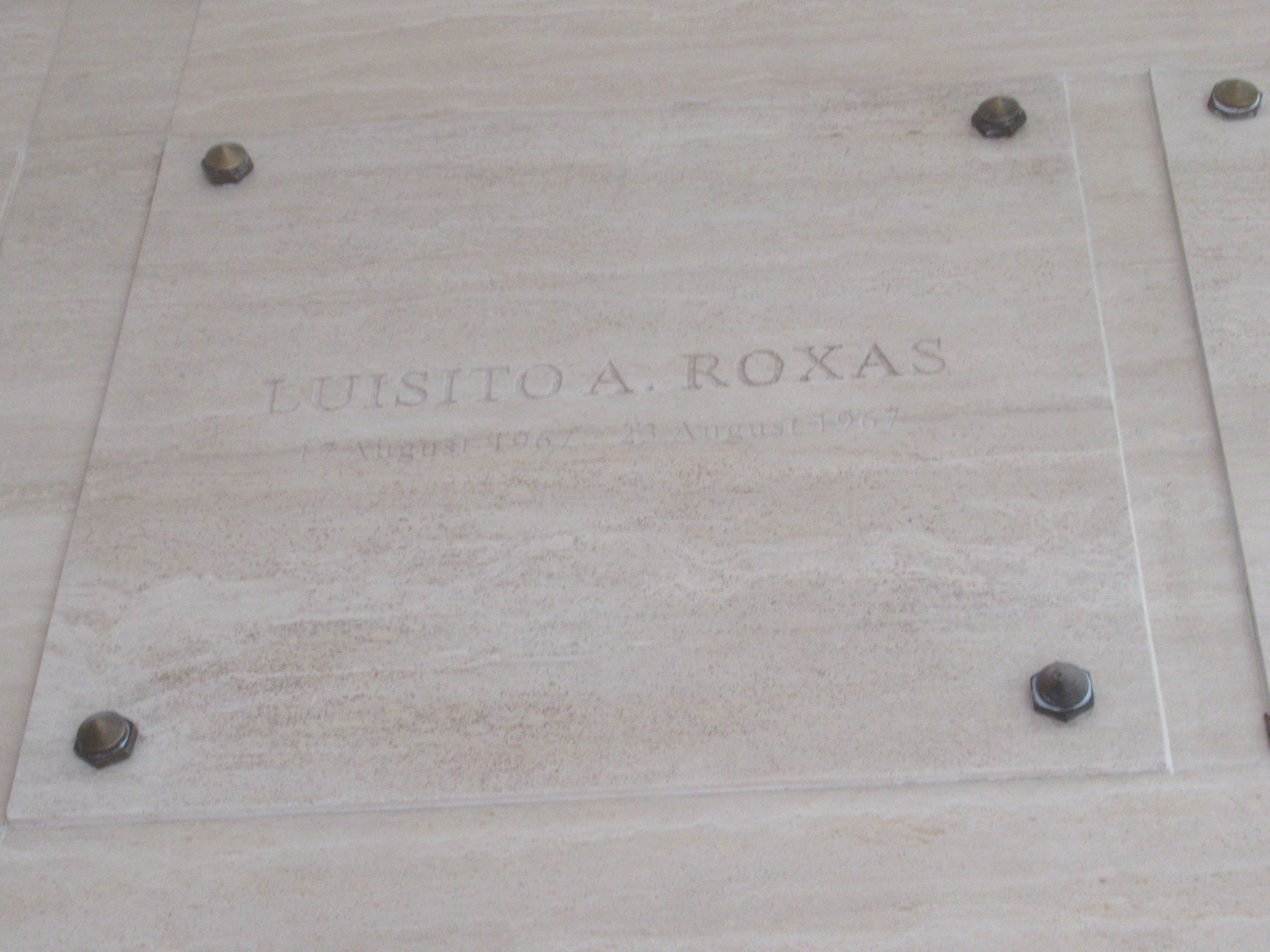
Luisito A. Roxas Cenotaph

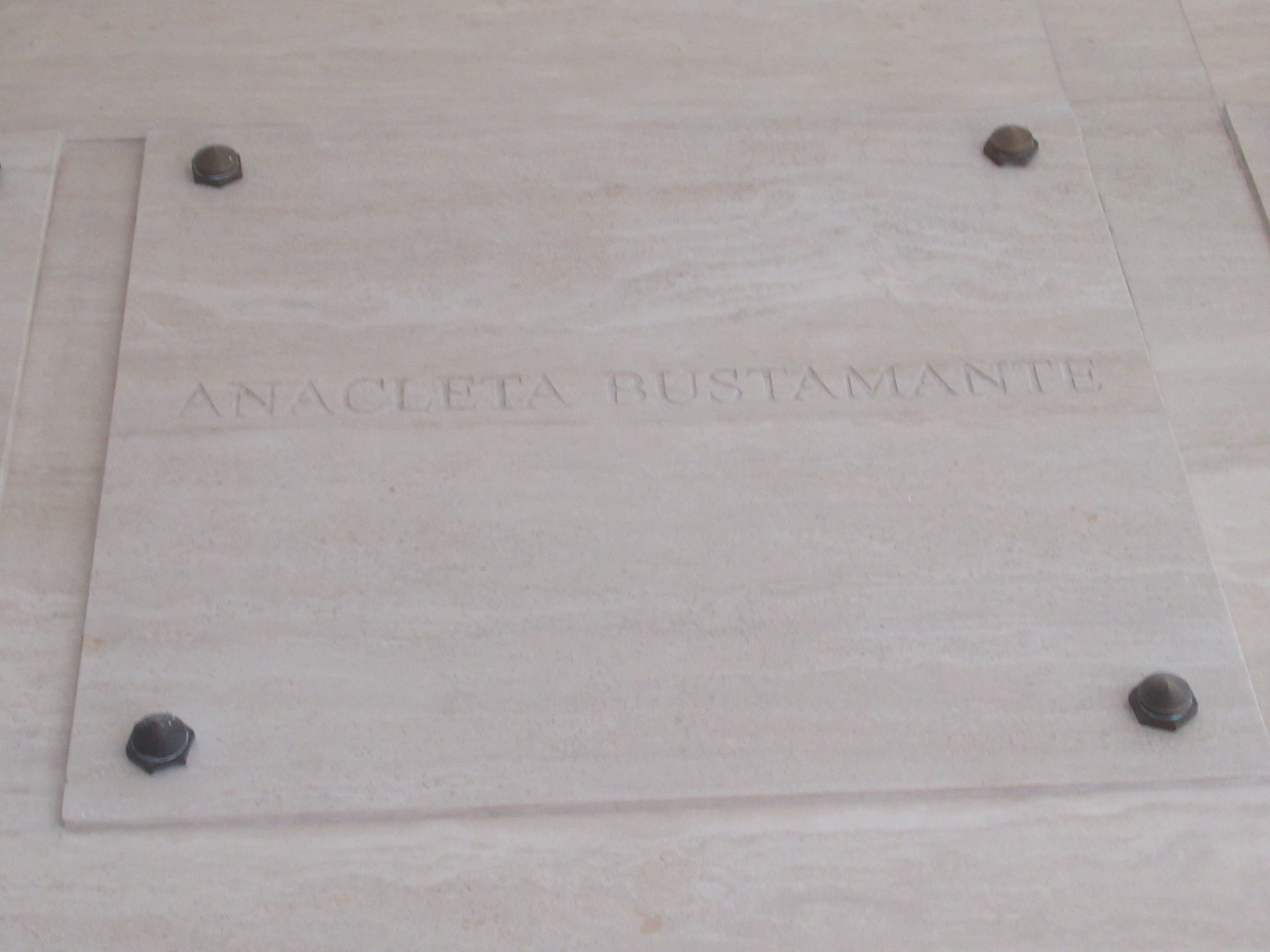
Anacleta Bustamante Cenotaph

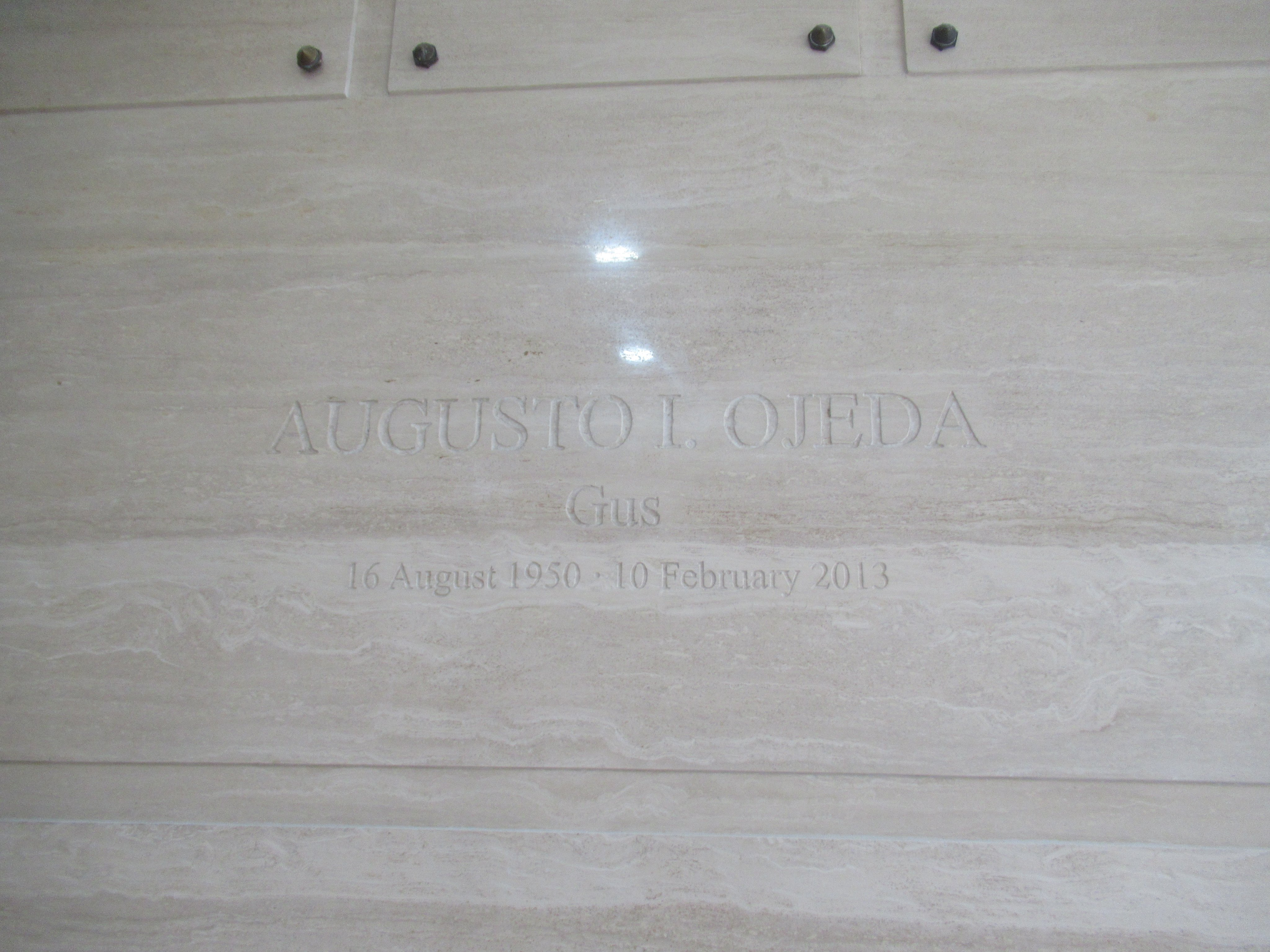
Augusto I. Ojeda Cenotaph

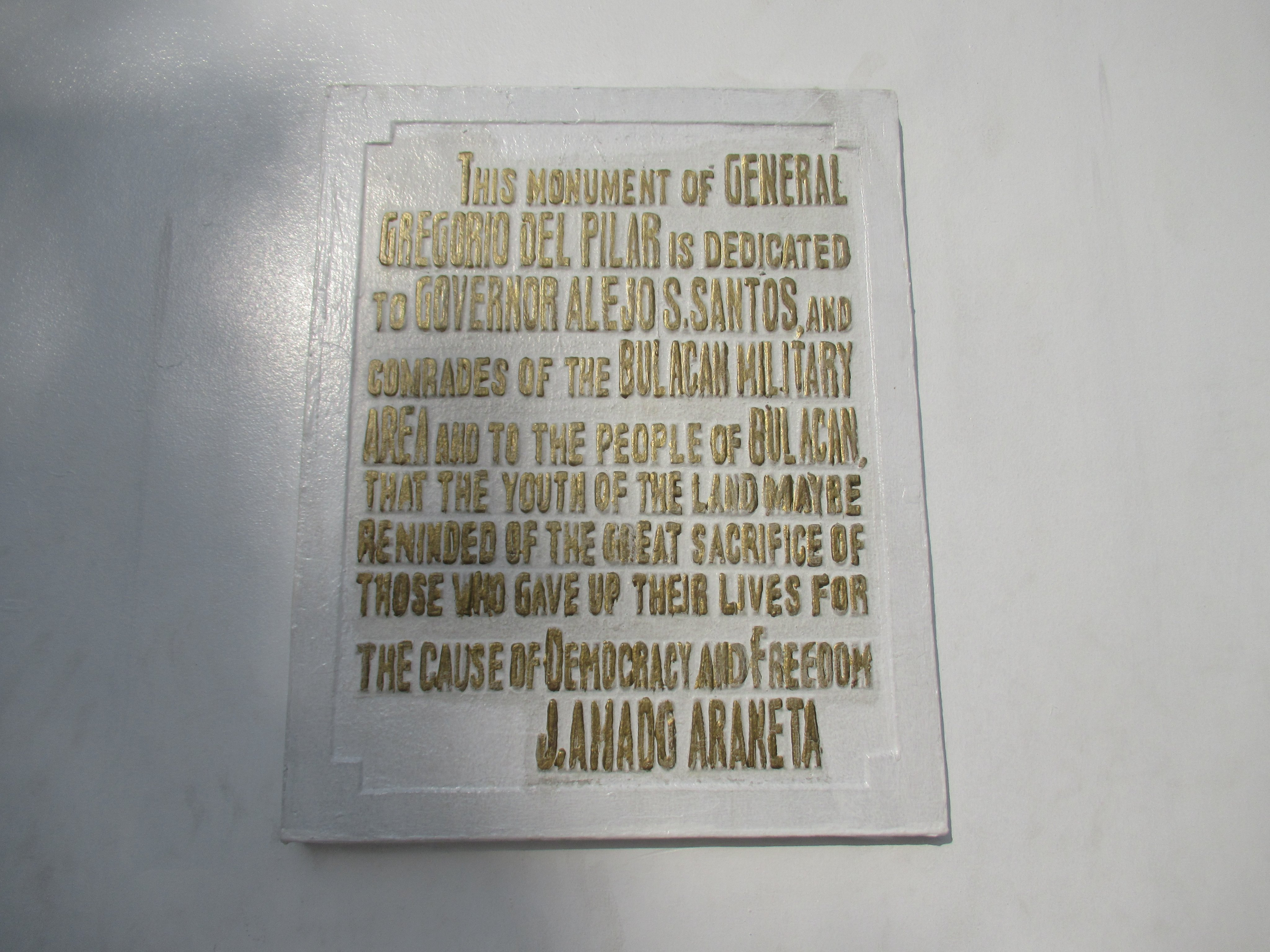
Araneta's legacy (Gregorio del Pilar marker)

== See also ==
- Araneta family
