= Sorsogon National High School =

Public high school in Sorsogon, Philippines

Coordinates: 12°58′30″N 124°00′32″E

Information
- Established: 1903; 123 years ago
- Enrollment: 5312 (2014)

Sorsogon National High School, in Sorsogon City, Philippines, was established in 1903. It was formerly known as Sorsogon Provincial High School. The cornerstone was laid by Alice Roosevelt on 1905 during her visit with Howard Taft.

There was a time that students on the said school would come from different parts of the provinces.

The school's historical main building was burned down twice: once during Japanese occupation, in 1941, and again in a devastating fire in February 2014. The main building has been rebuilt while maintaining its original and historic facade. Mr. Michael M. Uy, Education Program Supervisor (EPS), currently sits as the Officer - In - Charge of the Office of the School Principal since February, 2021. As of 2014, 5,312 students are enrolled. A 2015 proposal to rename the school in honor of Filipino politician Salvador Escudero III met with strong opposition from alumni and other stakeholders.

Notable Alumni:

- Jesus Lim Arranza – A former corps commander of Preparatory Military Training (PMT) at Sorsogon Provincial High School; became executive of different corporations including United Coconut Planters Bank.
