= The Upper East =

Project
- Opening date: 2015
- Developer: Megaworld Premier
- Operator: Megaworld Corporation
- Owner: Araneta Group

Location
- Interactive map of The Upper East
- Coordinates: 10°40′35.7″N 122°57′1.2″E
- Location: Brgy. Villamonte, Bacolod, Negros Occidental, Philippines

The Upper East, formerly the Bacolod-Murcia Milling Company Complex, is Megaworld's township and industrial estate development in Bacolod city, situated in the 34-hectare land owned by the Araneta Group. While the Araneta Group planned it to be the "Araneta Center of the South", they inked a joint partnership with Megaworld Corporation to develop the inactive property.

== As BMAC ==
The site was previously occupied by the milling infrastructure of the Bacolod-Murcia Milling Company, which includes railways, hauling facilities and a main sugar-processing plant. Railway coverage includes the nearby haciendas owned by the Gatuslao, Gonzaga, Lizares and Montelibano families. BMAC closed its doors in the early 1990s, after several complaints and exit by milling partners and the health hazard it poses on nearby residents. However, the Araneta Group maintained its Visayas office in the property.

== Megaworld development ==
On March 19, 2015, Megaworld bared their plans in the developing the property as an urban township with a mall, residential condominiums, corporate facilities, as part of their expansion in the Visayas, with construction and development is currently ongoing.

Along with the sister project Northhill, along the boundary of Bacolod and Talisay, Megaworld will invest P35 million for the next 10 years. Upper East is expected to generate up to 250,000 direct and indirect jobs in BPO, construction, transportation, commercial and retail businesses, and envisioned to be the next premier business district of the city.

The development includes the Upper East Mall, a 24,200 m^{2} (260,000 sq ft) 3-level mall, aimed to be Bacolod's first green mall, featuring 4 cinemas, an open-air food hall with an indoor garden, solar panel roofing, energy efficiency features, and a 48-meter clock tower. With One Regis and Two Regis Condominium Projects.
