= Margarita Forés =

Filipino chef and restaurateur (1959–2025)

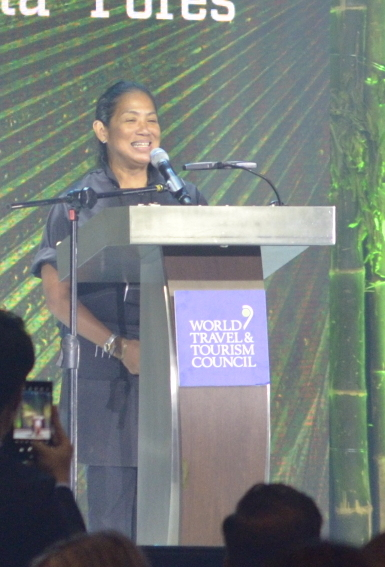
- Forés at the World Travel and Tourism Council Global Summit 2022
- Born: Margarita Araneta Forés; March 23, 1959
- Died: February 11, 2025 (aged 65); Hong Kong
- Resting place: Loyola Memorial Park Marikina, Philippines
- Other name: Gaita Forés
- Education: Assumption College San Lorenzo
- Children: 1
- Family: Araneta
- Culinary career
- Current restaurants
- Cibo (chain); Lusso; Grace Park; Alta
- Awards
- Asia's Best Female Chef 2016

Margarita "Gaita" Araneta Forés (March 23, 1959 – February 11, 2025) was a Filipino chef and restaurateur. In 2016, she was named Asia's Best Female Chef on the World's 50 Best Restaurants. Forés initially worked in catering before launching the chain Cibo, as well as several individual restaurants.

== Early life ==
Born on March 23, 1959, to Raul Forés and María Lourdes Araneta, Margarita Forés was a granddaughter of the tycoon J. Amado Araneta, owner and developer of the Araneta Center in Cubao, Quezon City, and eminent surgeon Dr. Jose Y. Fores, one of the founders of the Makati Medical Center. She grew up in Manila until she was a freshman attending Assumption College San Lorenzo, when the family moved to New York City. The culture in her new city would eventually serve as inspiration for her culinary career, with Sunday visits to the same midtown American-Italian restaurant led to her interest in learning about the Italian food that was not so well known outside of the local areas in the country.

Once in America, she attended the Marymount School of New York on the Upper East Side of the city. She attended Mount Holyoke College for two years, by which time she had a Filipino boyfriend and asked her mother to return to her home country. Upon her return, she resumed her education until graduation in 1981 at Assumption College San Lorenzo. By this time, the romantic relationship ended. With a degree in accountancy, she moved to Hong Kong and worked as a trainee for Axona Holdings. While there, she began to experiment with cooking. When the company downsized during the 1980s as the market shrank while preparations were underway for the British colony to be transferred to China, she moved back to New York.

Reunited with her family, her mother got her a job working for fur licensee Valentino's, and eventually moved onto their head office. While she was away, her mother had become heavily involved in the New York party scene, with Forés later recalling the time she was introduced to people such as Salvador Dalí, John F. Kennedy Jr., Franco Rossellini and Margaux Hemingway. She once again began to cook for herself, family and friends, describing it as a Martha Stewart influenced approach. Following the death of her grandfather J. Amado Araneta in November 1985, the family returned to Manila. She began to crave a change, describing it as "They say when there are major changes in a family, when something happens to key members, it's an opportunity for other members of the family to also make changes in their lives, it was a pivotal point. I was beginning to see that I was becoming more passionate about food than the fashion. It didn’t really get me in the gut as much as the food."

== Culinary career ==
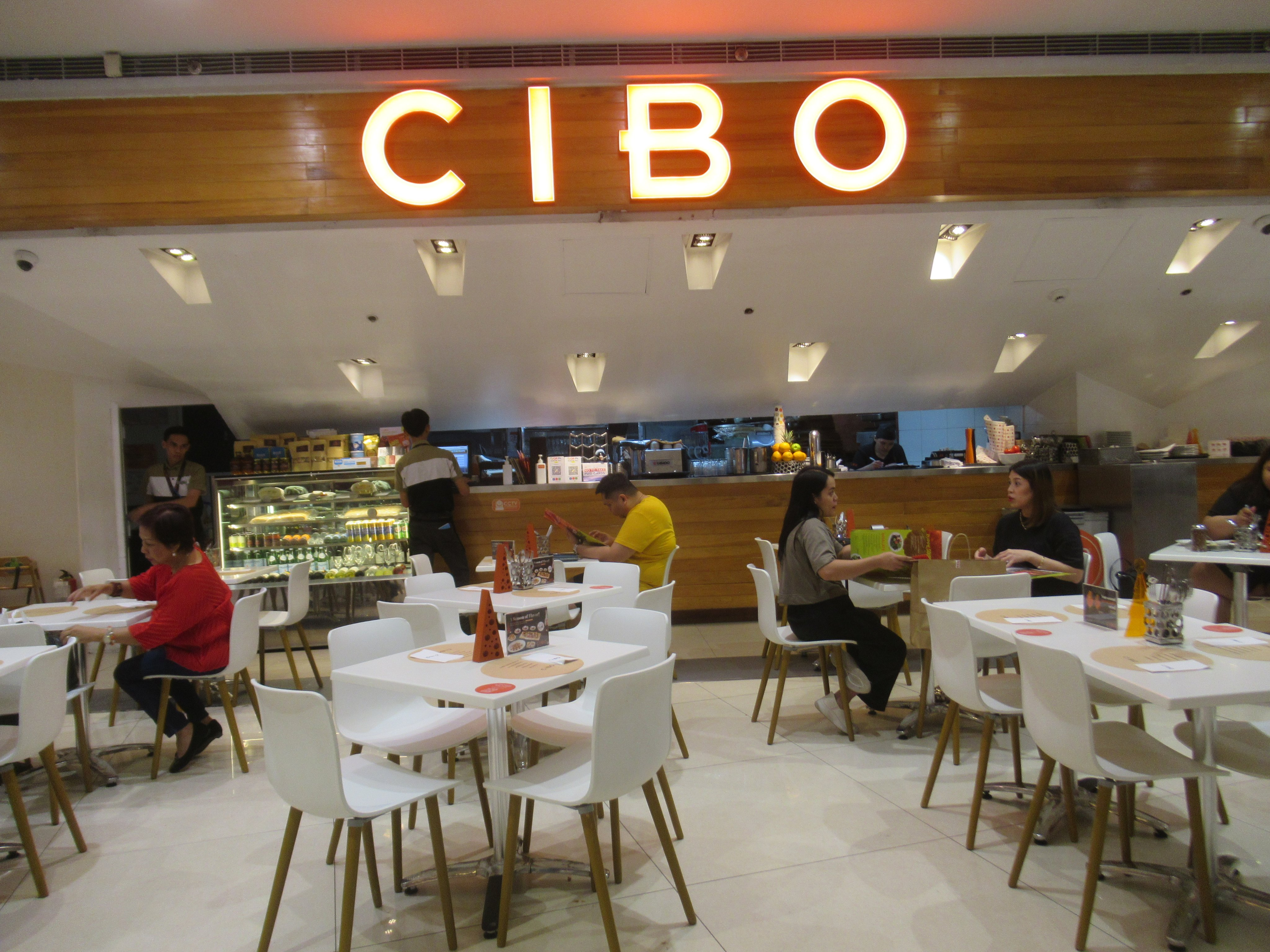
A Cibo restaurant at SM Megamall, Mandaluyong

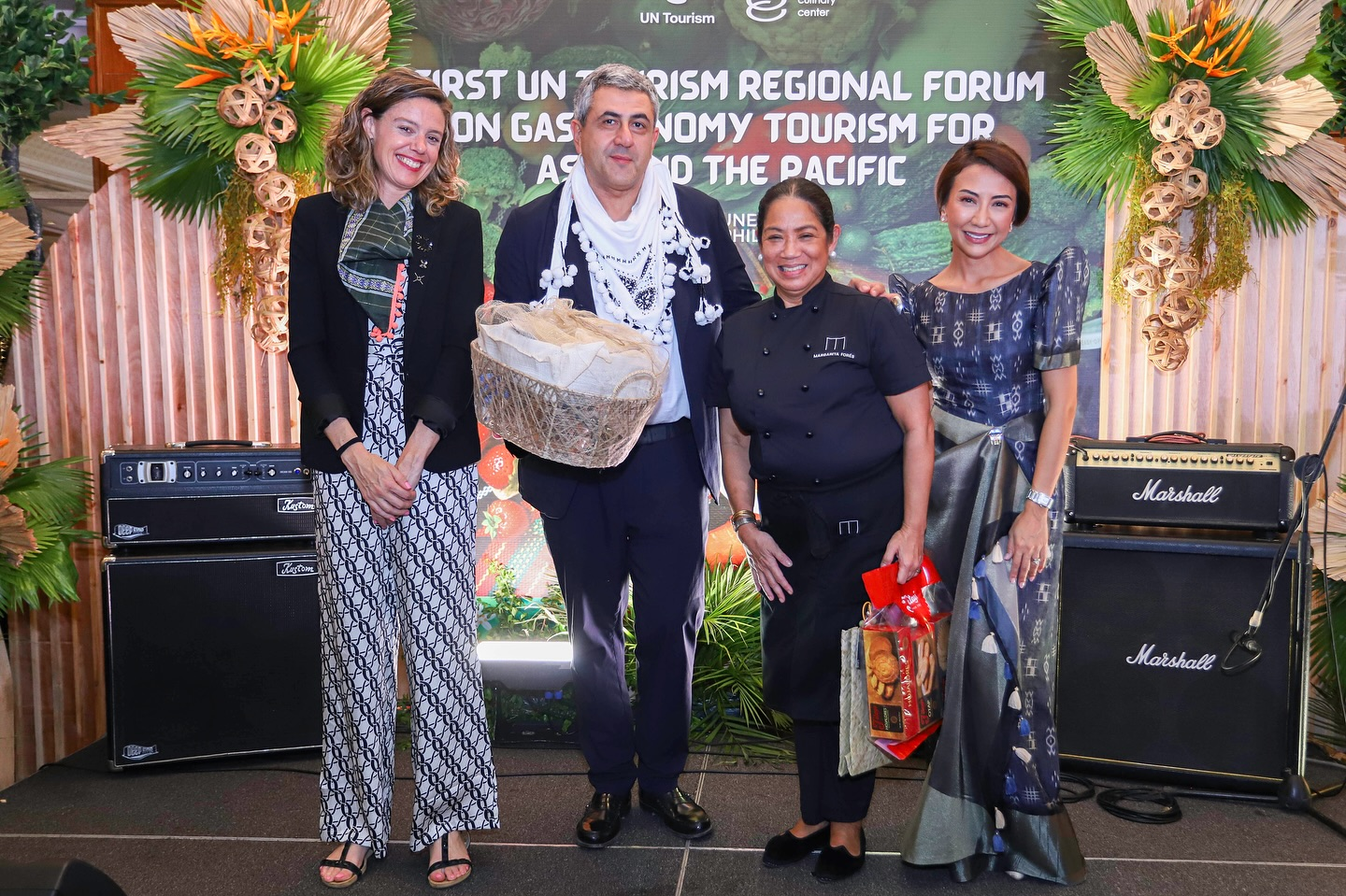
Forés (second from the right) at a UN Tourism forum on culinary tourism in Cebu in June 2024

In 1986, Forés went to Italy for four months to undertake intensive training both in Italian cuisine as well as the language. She has had no formal training in culinary skills. Forés studied under three chefs in Italy, Masha Innoscenti in Florence, Jo Bettoja in Rome, and Ada Parasiliti in Milan. Having made friends in Italy, she learned additional techniques from watching people in their homes create food such as pesto, saying, "It was really like an immersion, learning it from an Italian family and an Italian mother. How much better can your education in Italian food and culture get?" The trip to Italy also helped her to overcome bulimia, something she had been affected by since returning to New York.

She initially began as a caterer, having created the company Cibo Di M, cooking directly in people's homes with two sous chefs to help her. She ran a food festival in the restaurant at the Hyatt Regency Manila which was a success, although she was stigmatised because of her privileged upbringing.

In 1997, she opened her first Cibo restaurant in Glorietta, Makati, which she specifically targeted at serving traditional Italian food but with good value for money. Her mother provided the seed money for the venture. She saw her main competitors at the time as being the American cuisine chains TGI Friday's and Hard Rock Cafe, but criticized that these were not Filipino-owned operations.

In addition to the Cibo chain, she controlled the restaurants Lusso, Grace Park and Alta. They each serve Italian cuisine but in different ways, with Lusso refining Italian comfort food, while Grace Park includes some of her twists on childhood favourites, including a savoury Eton mess with pancetta, bacon, and truffle oil served alongside the meringue components. This restaurant was opened after she recovered from cancer, and so it inspired her to work predominantly with organic ingredients, which was not common in the Philippines at the time. The menu also includes some elements of Filipino cuisine. Alta is her most recent restaurant, located within the Ascott Hotel at Bonifacio Global City in Taguig. In May 2024, Forés's Grace Park Dining landed 12th place on Opinionated About Dining's "Top Casual Restaurants in Asia" list. That same month, Forés and her son Amado were joined by Japanese celebrity chef Hiroyuki Tamura in creating "Batchoy Ramen", a fusion cuisine of Ilonggo batchoy and ramen.

In 2016, she appeared on an episode of Inspired With Anna Olson, with Canadian chef Anna Olson. That same year, she also appeared on CNN's television series Culinary Journeys. In June 2025, she appeared posthumously in an episode of the Netflix food travel series Somebody Feed Phil.

In October 2025, nearly nine months after her death, Forés's Lusso was selected in the Philippines's inaugural edition of the Michelin Guide.

== Personal life and death ==
Forés survived cancer twice, including thyroid cancer around 2006. She had a son, Jorge Amado (the namesake of her grandfather), who owns the Italian restaurant a mano and the Japanese restaurant Ramen Ron.

Forés was found dead on February 11, 2025, inside her room at the Upper House hotel in Admiralty, Hong Kong. She had been returning to Manila from a trip to Morocco and Madrid, with a stopover in Hong Kong. Forés's family stated that her cause of death was cardiac arrest.

== Awards ==
Forés was named Asia's Best Female Chef as part of the 2016 Asia's 50 Best Restaurants list, part of The World's 50 Best Restaurants. Forés admitted surprise at winning the award, comparing it to Miss Universe, and credited the victory to her work in promoting Filipino products both within the Philippines and abroad. She promoted Job's tears, a gluten-free grain grown in areas of the Philippines where rice does not grow successfully.

In 2018, Forés was awarded the Order of the Star of Italy with the rank of Knight. On May 4, 2025, Forés was posthumously conferred with the Presidential Medal of Merit from President Bongbong Marcos for her services to the culinary field.
