= Anona =

Anona may refer to:

- Anona, Ecuador
- Anona, Florida
- "Anona" (song), a popular song written by Vivian Grey
- Anona Pak (born 1993), New Zealand badminton player
- Anona Winn (1904–1994), Australian actress and broadcaster
- Degree of Anona, a youth group attached to the Degree of Pocahontas

== See also ==
- Annona (disambiguation)
- Aenona (disambiguation)
- Antona (disambiguation)
