= LRTA 2000 class =

LRTA Rolling Stock operating at Manila Line 2

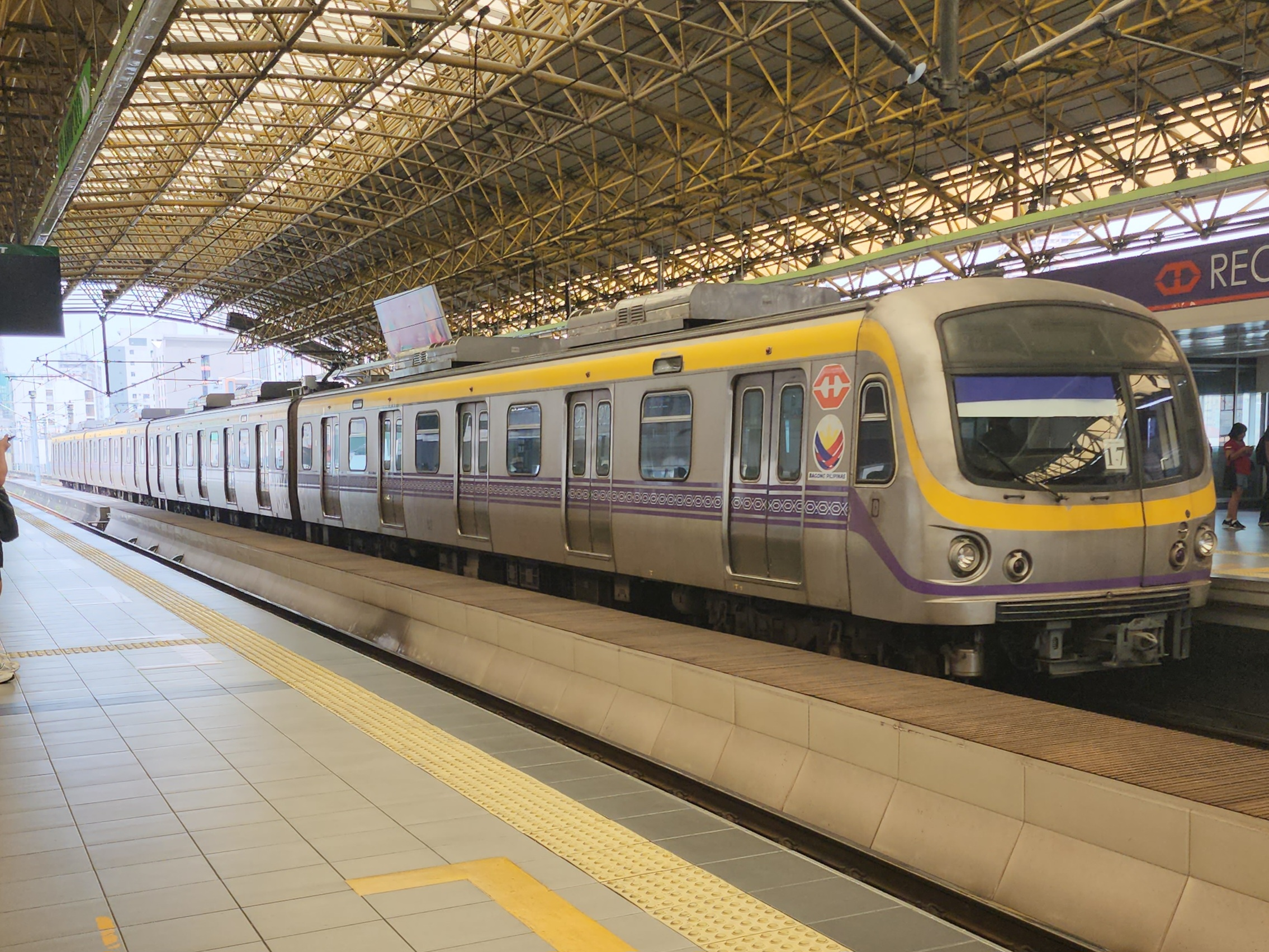
- A 2000 class EMU at Recto station in October 2024

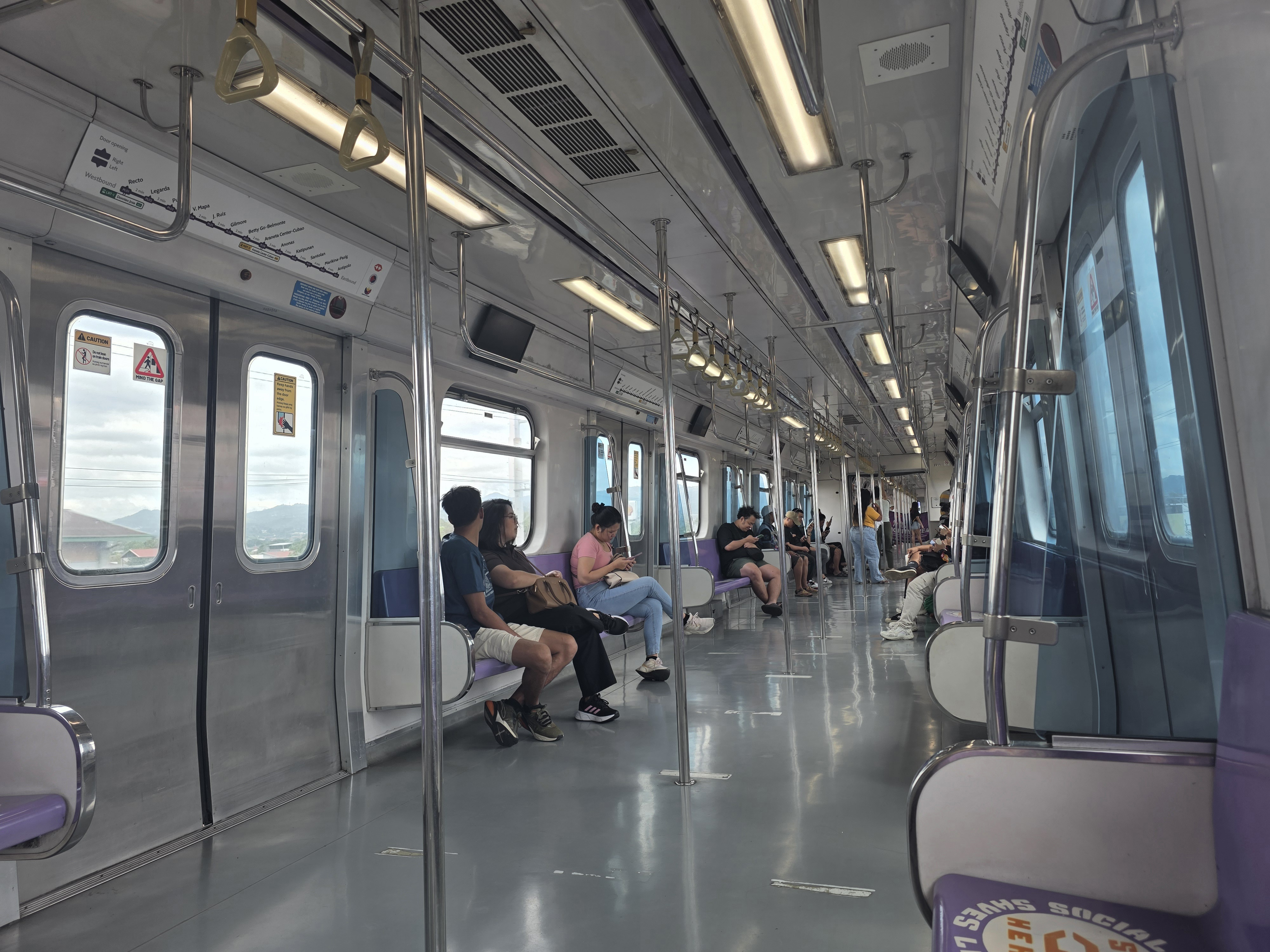
- Train interior in March 2026
- Stock type: Electric multiple unit
- In service: 2003–present
- Manufacturers: Rotem and Toshiba
- Built at: Uiwang, South Korea
- Constructed: 2002–2003
- Entered service: April 5, 2003; 23 years ago
- Refurbished: 2021–2025
- Number built: 72 vehicles (18 sets)
- Number in service: 40 vehicles (10 sets)
- Formation: 4 cars per trainset Mc–M–M–Mc
- Fleet numbers: 2001–2072
- Capacity: 1,628 per train (232 seats)
- Operator: Light Rail Transit Authority
- Depot: Santolan
- Line served: Line 2

Specifications
- Car body construction: Stainless steel
- Train length: 93.2 m (305 ft 9 1/4 in)
- Car length: 23.3 m (76 ft 5 3/8 in)
- Width: 3.2 m (10 ft 6 in)
- Height: 4.1 m (13 ft 5 3/8 in)
- Floor height: 1.1 m (3 ft 7 1/4 in)
- Platform height: 1.1 m (3 ft 7 1/4 in)
- Doors: Double-leaf pocket-type; 5 per side 1.4 m × 1.9 m (55 in × 75 in)
- Wheel diameter: 850–790 mm (33–31 in) (new–worn)
- Wheelbase: 2.3 m (7 ft 7 in)
- Maximum speed: 80 km/h (50 mph) (design); 45 to 80 km/h (28 to 50 mph) (service)
- Weight: 160.1 t (353,000 lb) (tare); 332.4 t (733,000 lb) (laden)
- Axle load: 16.85 t (37,100 lb)
- Steep gradient: 5%
- Traction system: Toshiba IGBT–VVVF (as built); Woojin IGBT–VVVF (upgraded)
- Traction motors: 16 × 120 kW (160 hp) 3-phase AC induction
- Power output: 1.92 MW (2,570 hp)
- Transmission: Westinghouse-Natal (WN) drive
- Gear ratio: 7.93:1
- Acceleration: 1.3 m/s^{2} (4.3 ft/s^{2})
- Deceleration: 1.3 m/s^{2} (4.3 ft/s^{2}) (service); 1.5 m/s^{2} (4.9 ft/s^{2}) (emergency)
- Auxiliaries: 3,300-volt IGBT PWM static inverter (160 kVA); 110 V DC batteries
- HVAC: Carrier 72FB-400X roof-mounted air-conditioning
- Electric systems: 1,500 V DC overhead catenary
- Current collection: Single-arm pantograph
- UIC classification: Bo′Bo′+Bo′Bo′+Bo′Bo′+Bo′Bo′
- Bogies: Bolsterless type
- Braking systems: Nabtesco electro-pneumatic, Regenerative, and rheostatic
- Safety systems: Siemens (Note: Invensys Rail Dimetronic/Westinghouse Signals were the original suppliers of the signaling system of the LRT Line 2; Siemens AG acquired the companies in 2013 and was amalgamated into Siemens Mobility.) TBS100 fixed block ATC under ATO GoA 2 (STO), with subsystems of ATP, Rail9000 ATS, and Westrace MK1 CBI
- Coupling system: Shibata close-contact (cab ends); Semi-permanent (non-cab ends)
- Seating: Longitudinal
- Track gauge: 1,435 mm (4 ft 8 1/2 in) standard gauge

Notes/references
- Sourced from unless otherwise noted.

The LRTA 2000 class is a class of electric multiple units in operation on Manila's LRT Line 2, manufactured by Rotem and Toshiba.

A total of seventy-two cars configurable to eighteen train sets were manufactured from 2002 to 2003 under the fourth package contract of the initial construction of Line 2.

== History ==
=== Purchase and production ===
The project's fourth package, which involved communications and fare systems, vehicles, and trackwork, had eight consortia submit bids in July 1997. The selected firms included: Sumitomo in partnership with GEC Alsthom (now Alstom), Alcatel, Barclays, and Meidensha Corporation; MMC Consortium made up of Mitsubishi Heavy Industries, Mitsubishi Corporation, and Hyundai Presicion (which later merged to become Rotem and was renamed Hyundai Rotem), with John Holland, Mitsubishi Electric, and Union Switch & Signal as subcontractors; CCDET Consortium consisting of Spanish companies Construcciones y Auxiliar de Ferrocarriles, Elecnor, Curbertas y MZOV (now Acciona), Dimetronic, and Tomen as subcontractors; USJP Consortium consisting of Nissho Iwai (now Sojitz Corporation), Raytheon Ebasco Overseas, General Railway Signal, and Nippon Sharyo; Kanemastu Corporation and Ansaldo SPA (now Hitachi Rail Italy) consortium with subcontractors Breda Construzioni, Hanjin Heavy Industries (later merged to become Rotem and renamed Hyundai Rotem) and Spie Entrans SA; Siemens/Mitsui consortium with Marta Transport as subcontractors; Asia-Europe MRT Consortium (AEMC) comprising Marubeni, Balfour Beatty, Toshiba, and Daewoo Heavy Industries (which later merged to form Rotem and was renamed Hyundai Rotem), with subcontractors GPT International and GEC Alsthom; and Adtranz, ABB Power, and Itochu Corporation consortium.

According to Senator Juan Ponce Enrile, the bidding was hounded with alleged anomalies. Although it was promptly corrected by the Estrada administration after it assumed power in the middle of that year, it also encountered similar anomalies in May 2000, such as the disqualification of two bidders in the final evaluation. Only Ansaldo and Siemens/Mitsui passed the technical evaluation process. Finally, AEMC secured the contract in September 2000, winning over MMC Consortium's bid.

Seventy-two train cars (18 sets) were produced by Rotem (now Hyundai Rotem) between 2002 and 2003. These were built in Uiwang, Gyeonggi-do, South Korea. Hyundai Rotem constructed the main car body while Toshiba provided the electric components. The first four train sets arrived in November 2002, while the remaining fourteen were delivered in the succeeding months.

=== Mainline operations ===
By 2014, twelve out of the eighteen sets remained in service. By May 2019, it was reduced to eight following a collision involving two train sets, and by October, further reduced to five following a power supply incident. By July 2021, running trains were increased to six after the opening of the east extension, subsequently increased to eight. Currently, eight trains are operational, while the other trains are being cannibalized for spare parts.

=== Upgrades ===
On April 16, 2018, the Light Rail Transit Authority signed a contract with Multi-Scan Corporation and MRail, Inc. for the replacement of 80 air-conditioning units in ten train sets. It used parts from the original equipment manufacturer of the air-conditioning units, Carrier Corporation. The replacement of air-conditioning units started on March 7, 2019, and was completed the following May 24.

Rehabilitation of three trains started on March 3, 2021. AMSCO JV, (Note: Joint venture of Autre Porte Technique Global Inc., Multi-Scan Corporation, and Opus Land Inc.) the then-maintenance provider of Line 2, started the installation of new train propulsion systems and train monitoring systems from Woojin Industrial Systems in three trains in order for those to return to service ahead of the original scheduled opening of the east extension the following April. The refurbishment was completed in the same year.

== Design ==
=== Car body ===
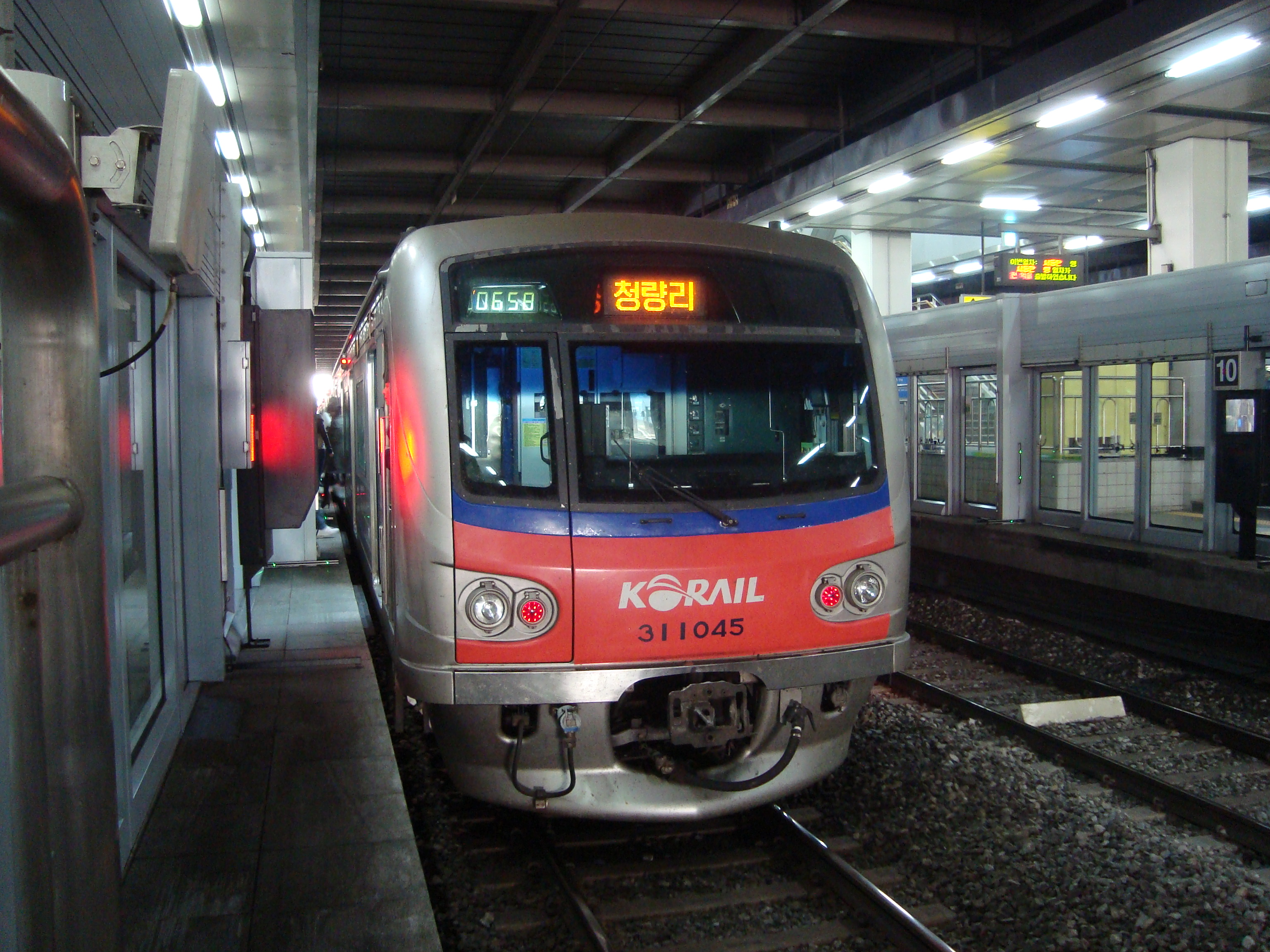
The front cab of the 2000 class trains resembles that of the front cab of the second-generation Korail Class 311000 trains (pictured above).

The car body is made of stainless steel, and the under frame shares the similar material with LAHT steel. The trains sport a livery of yellow and purple cheatlines. The upper yellow lines represent mango, the unofficial national fruit, while the thicker purple lines are based from the ube, sporting a geometric ethnic design.

The trains have round front ends, which bears resemblance to the second-generation Korail Class 311000 (Seoul Subway Line 1), 341000 (Seoul Subway Line 4), and 351000 (Suin–Bundang Line); these EMUs are also manufactured by Rotem (or then KOROS).

Each car has two roof-mounted air-conditioning units manufactured by Carrier with a cooling capacity of 40,400 kilocalories (169,000 kJ) per hour. In total, there are eight air-conditioning units in a single train set.

Trains prominently use wrap advertising. All the currently active train sets feature upgraded front destination signs, now in LED, instead of sign scrolls, of which the latter only its sides remained intact, albelt no longer used.

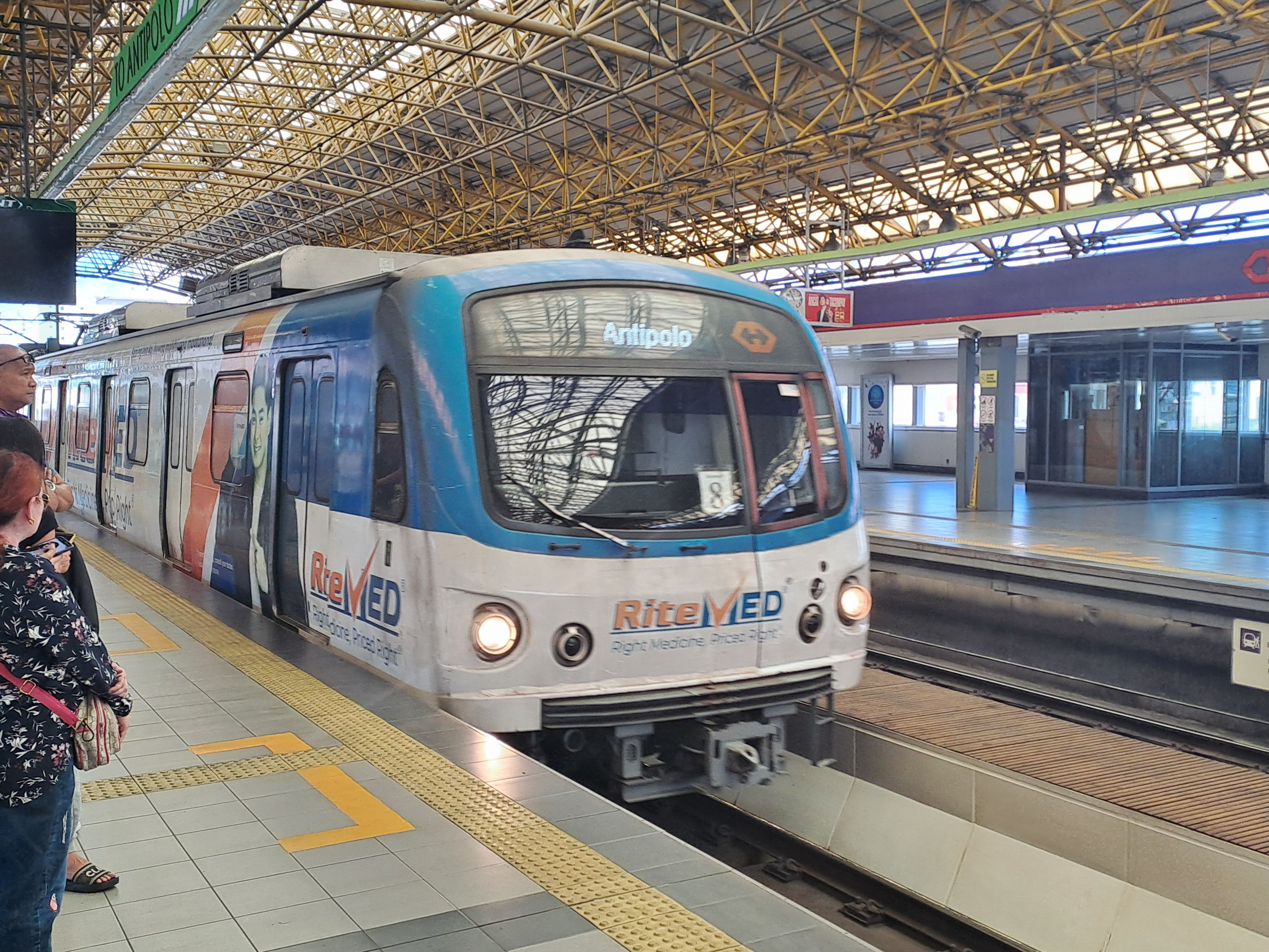
2000 class with newer LED signage at Recto station

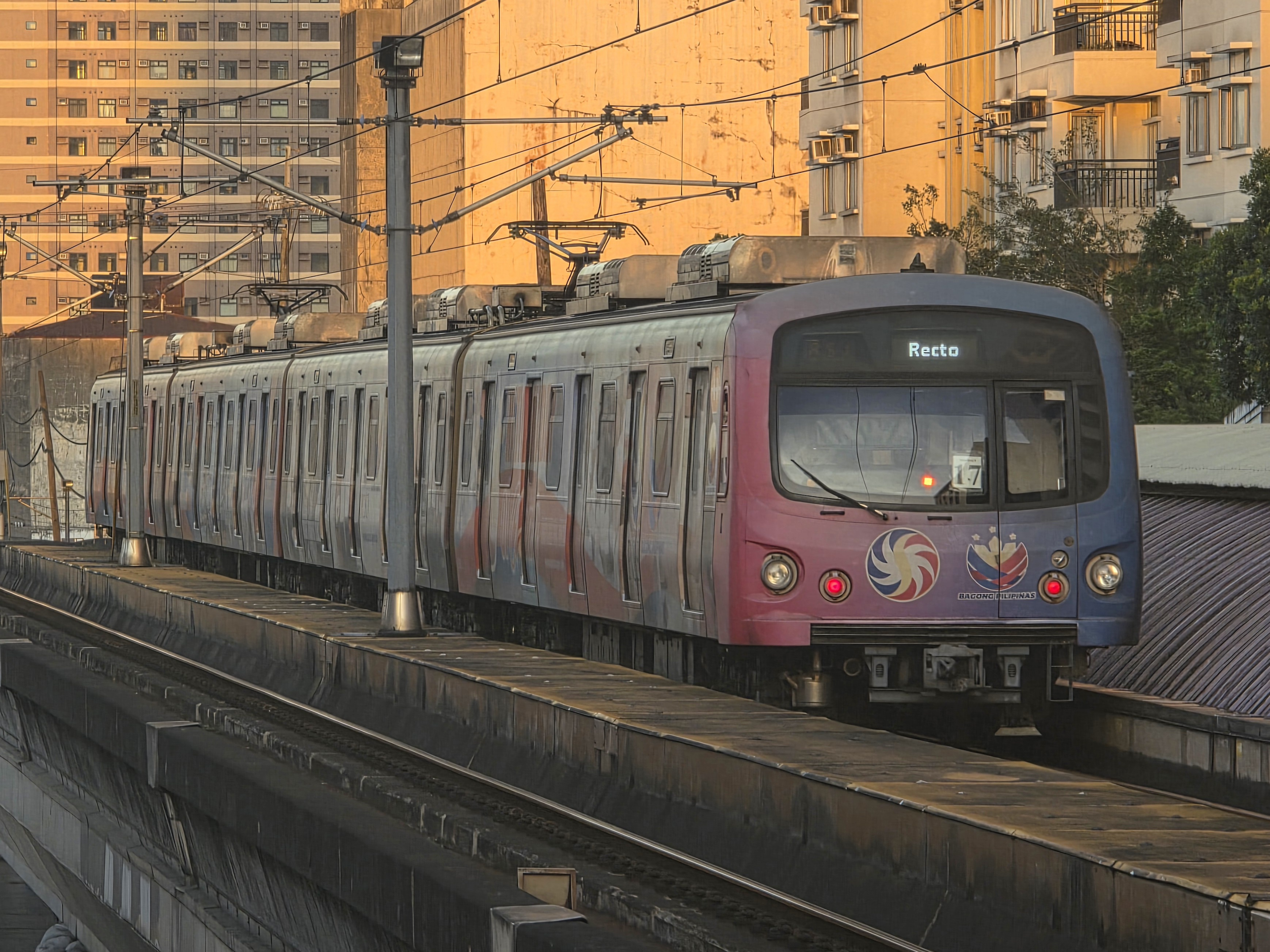
2000 class with PCSO wrap advertising at Araneta Center–Cubao station.

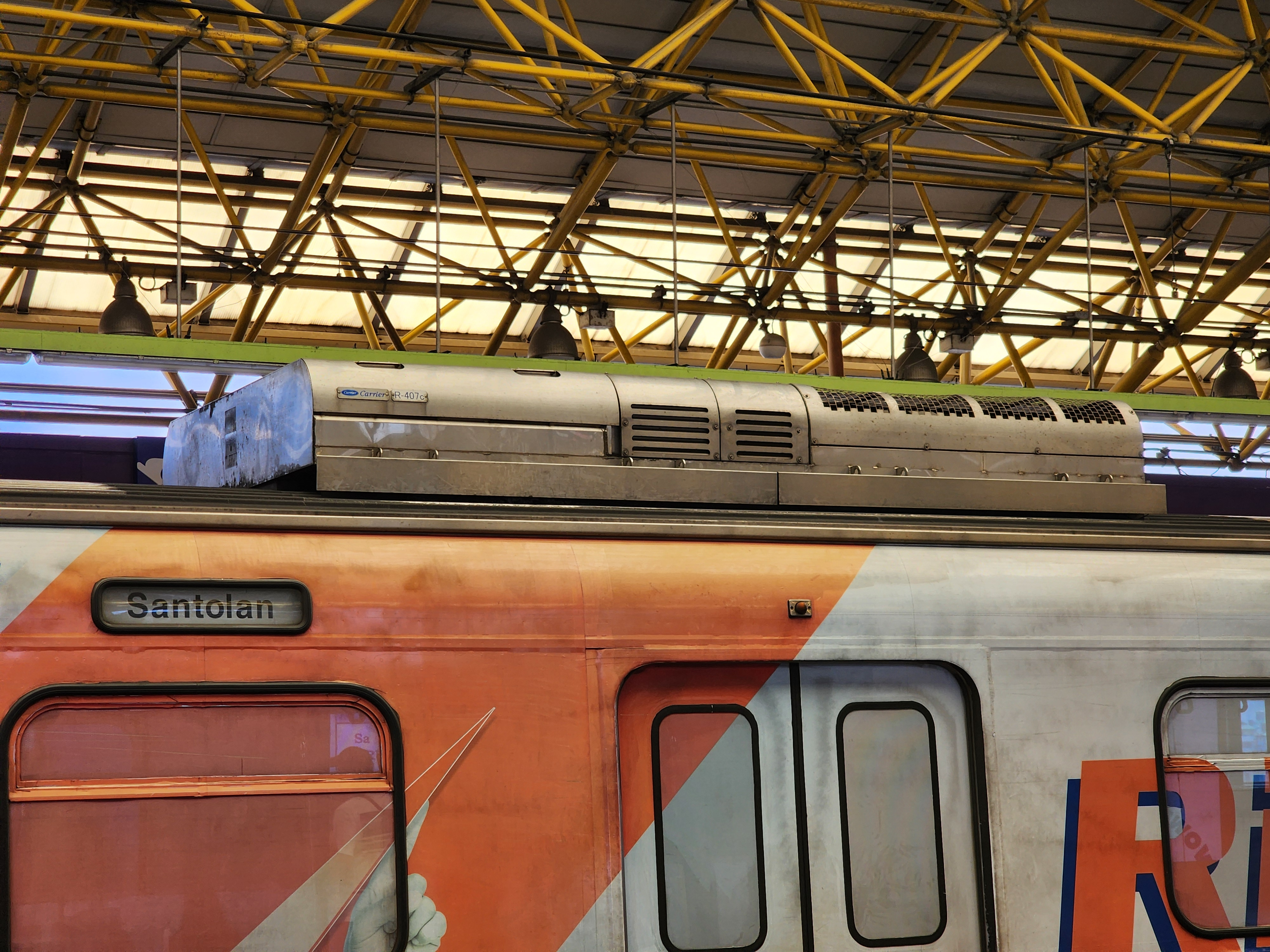
Carrier roof-mounted air conditioning units

=== Interior ===
The inner train space is lined with melamine and/or polyester faced ply metal. The windows are tinted safety glass, and the longitudinal seats are made of fiberglass reinforced plastics. The seats have a length of 1.6 to 2.4 meters (5 ft 3 in to 7 ft 10 in). The flooring is of stainless steel keystone plate and a thick, nonslip covering. Open gangways are present in between cars with a width of 1.5 meters (4 ft 11 in). In 2017, some trains were retrofitted with the Passenger Assist Railway Display System (now known as TUBE), a passenger information system powered by LCD screens installed near the inner ceiling of the trains that shows news, advertisements, current train location, arrivals and station layouts. However, as of 2022, the LCD screens remain switched off and unutilized.

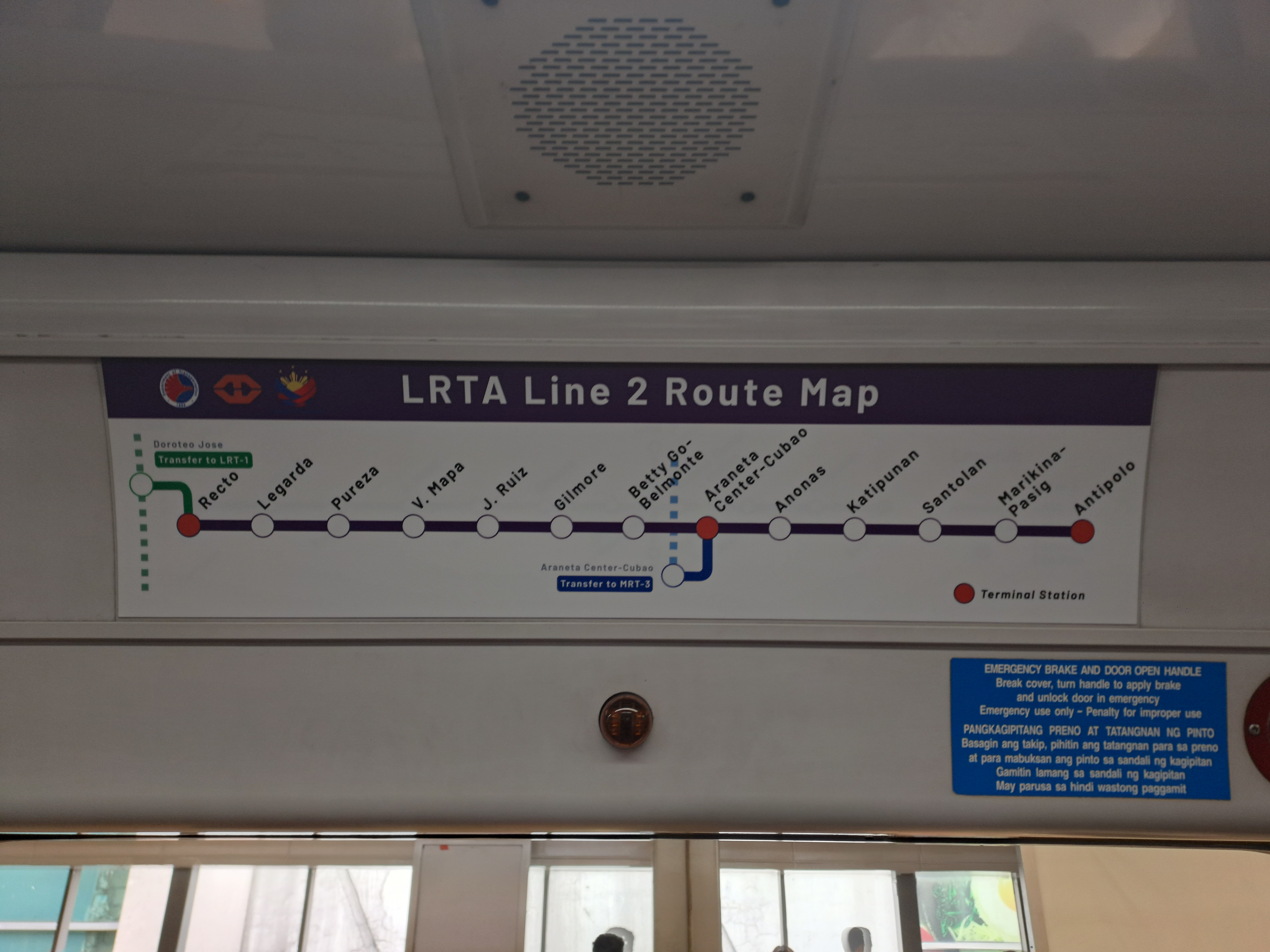
Route map above a light indicator

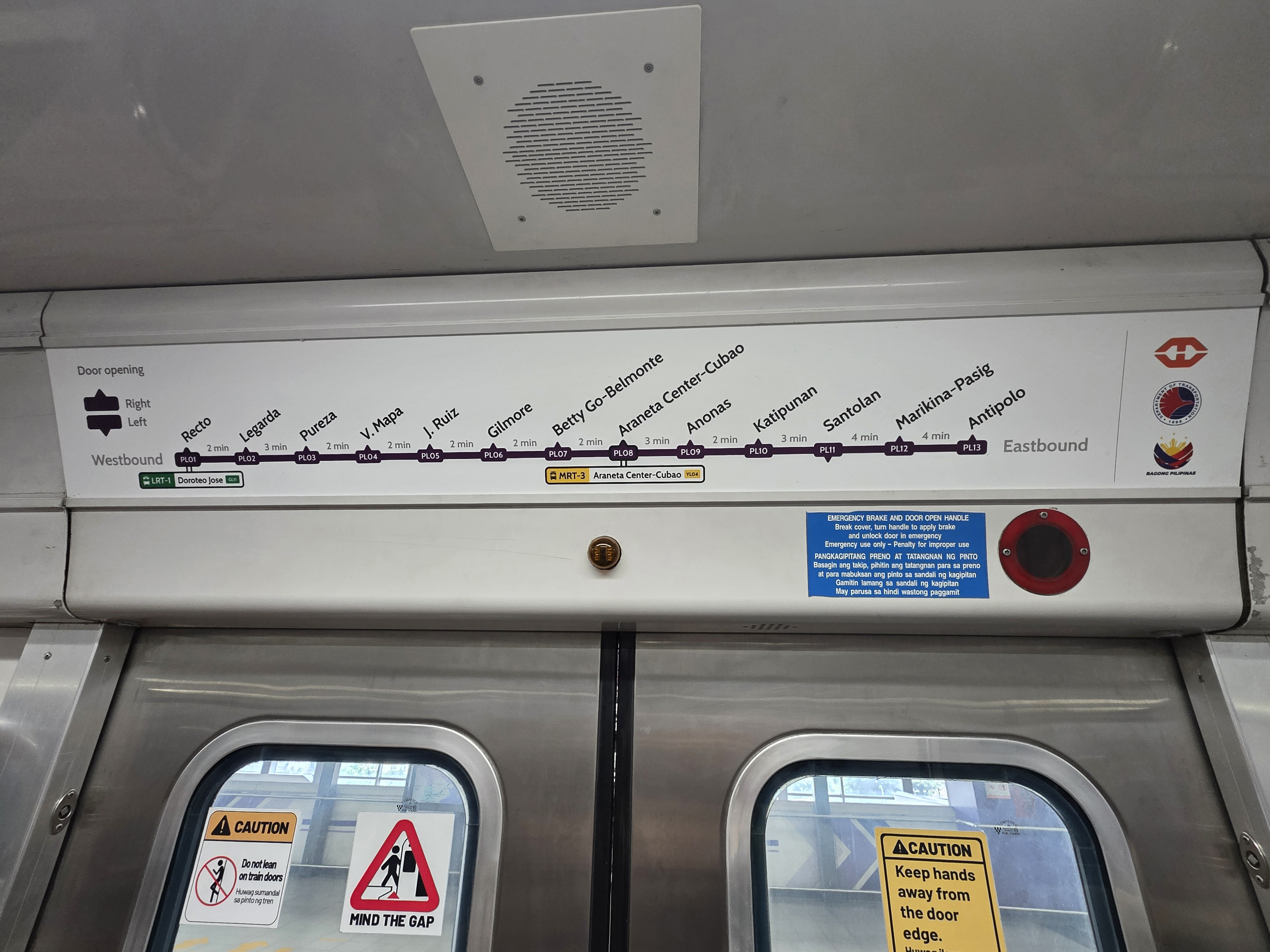
New route map (2025 version) with mind the gap stickers

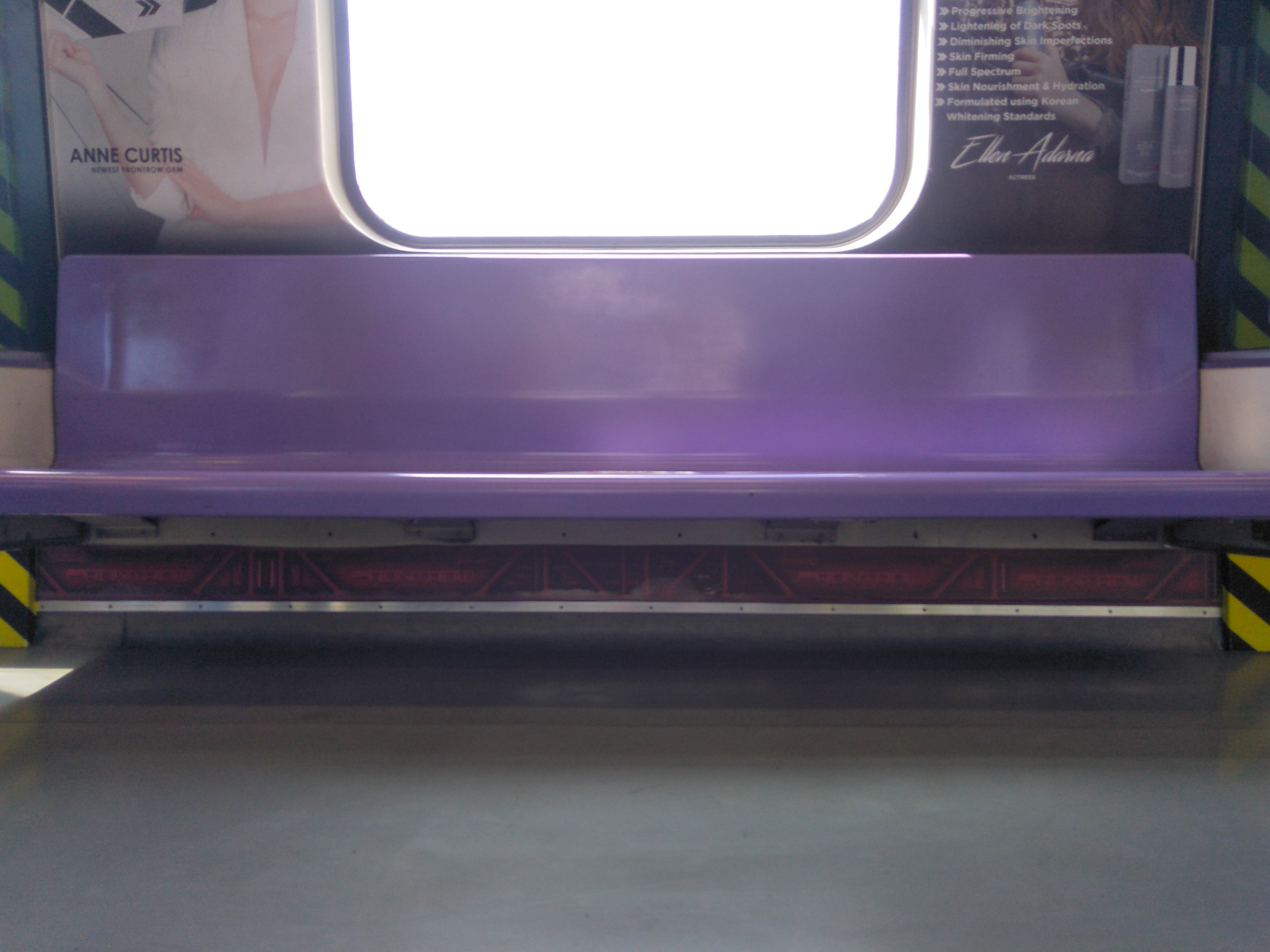
Longitudinal seats

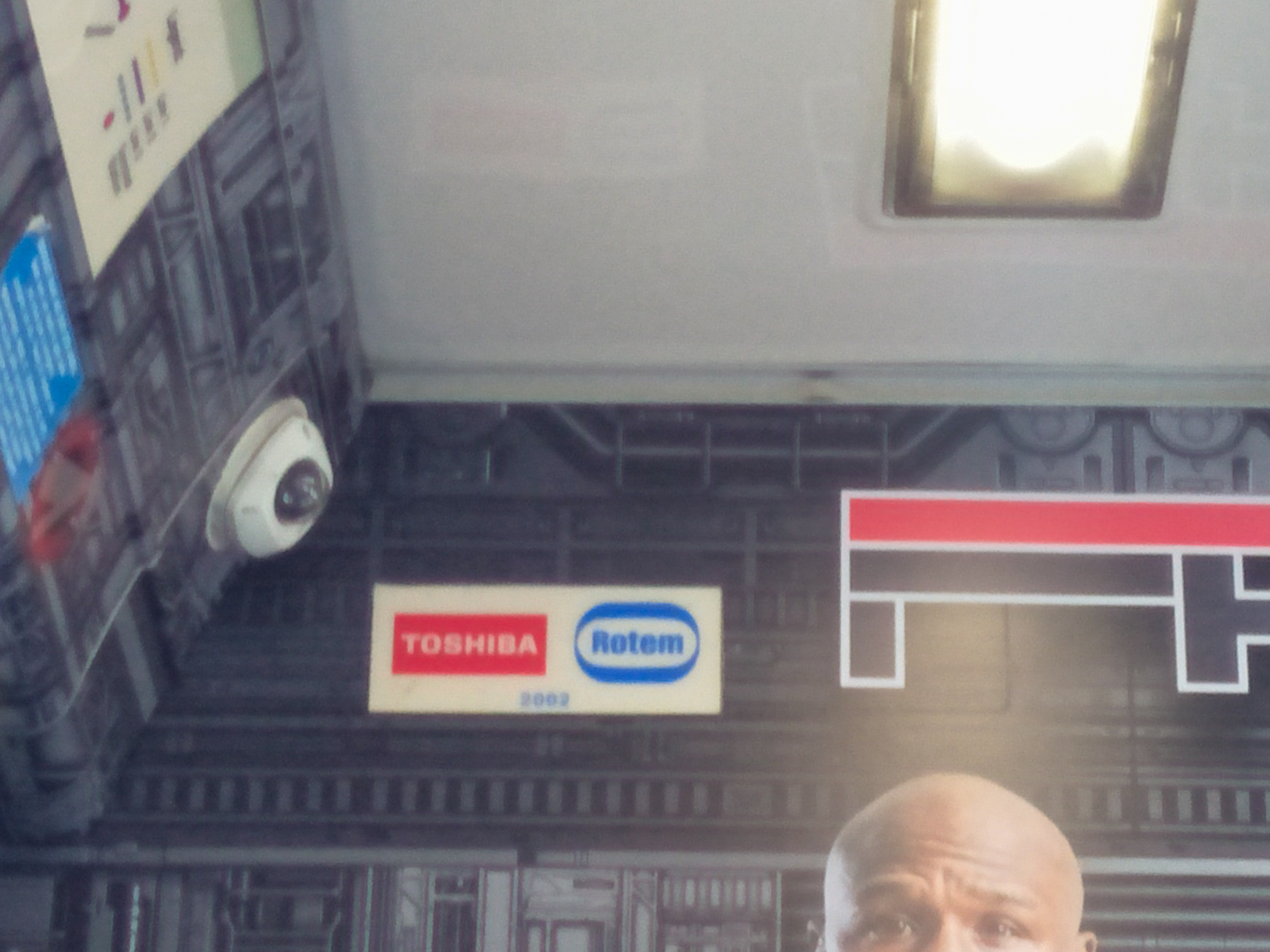
Builder's plate and a CCTV camera

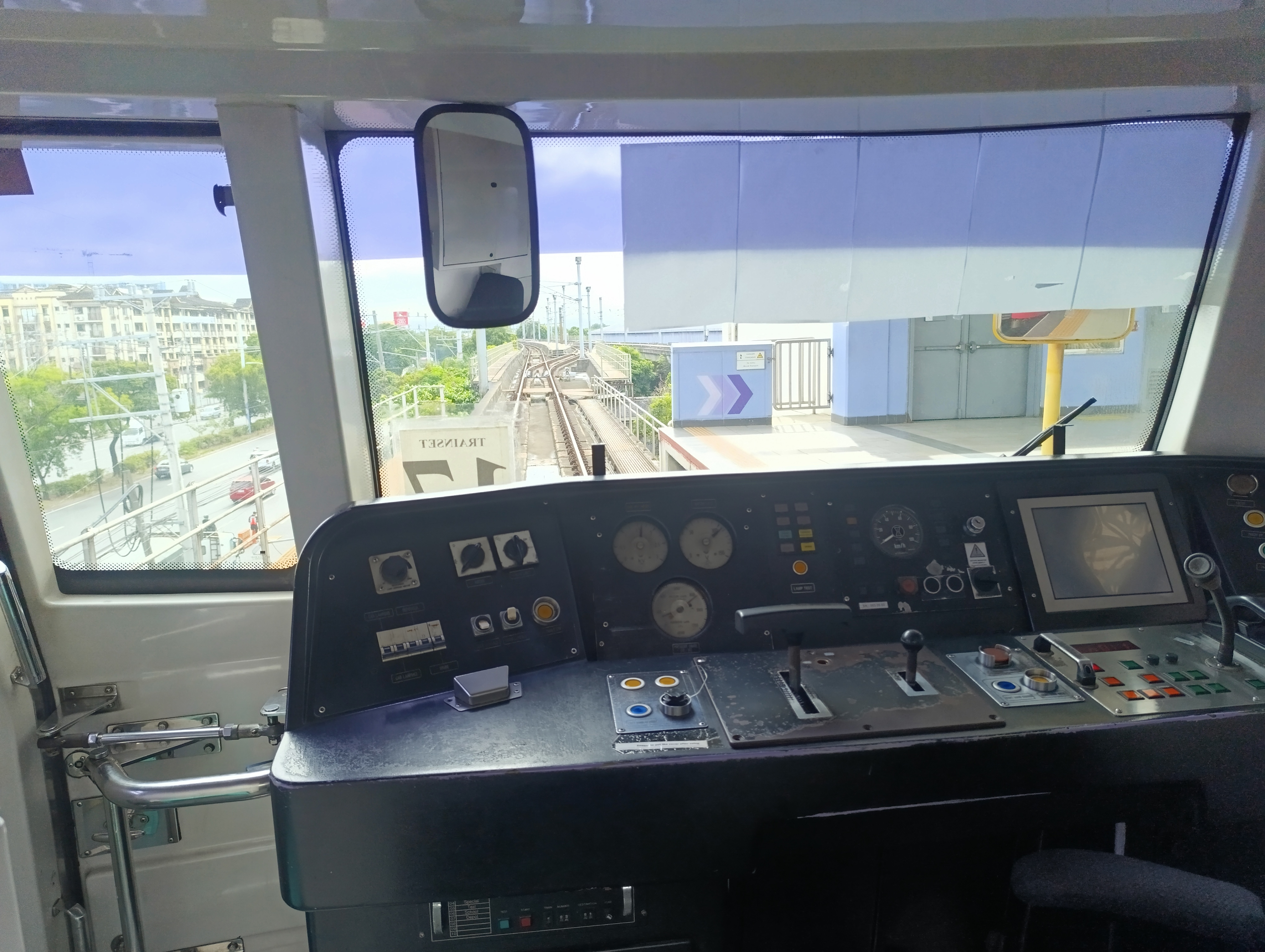
Driver's cab

=== Electrical and mechanical ===
Each car has two bolsterless bogies underneath the car with an axle length of 2.2 meters (7 ft 3 in). The primary suspension consists of an elastomeric spring and the secondary suspension is a diaphragm air spring. Mechanical Shibata couplers are present at the ends of the driver cabs, along with anti-climbers above it. Semi-permanent couplers are present in between cars (non-cab ends).

The traction system consists of VVVF inverters controlled by IGBT semiconductors. Two alternating current induction motors with a power output of 120 kilowatts (160 hp) are mounted on each bogie. Toshiba supplied the original VVVF controller and propulsion systems, while Woojin Industrial Systems supplied the new propulsion systems for three train sets. Its auxiliaries consist of 3,300-volt static inverters and 110-volt DC batteries.

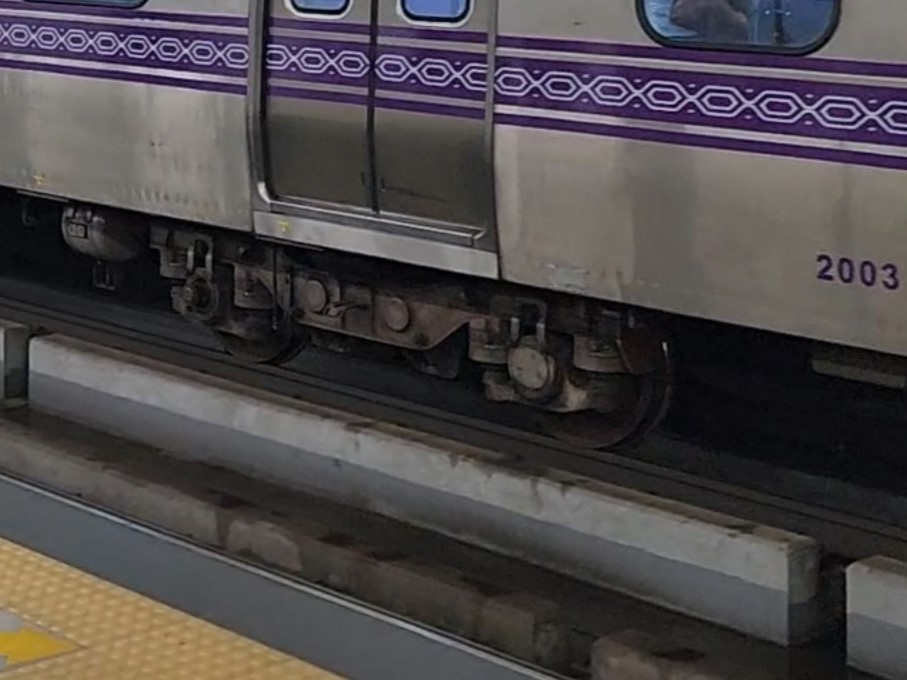
Bolsterless bogie of the 2000 class

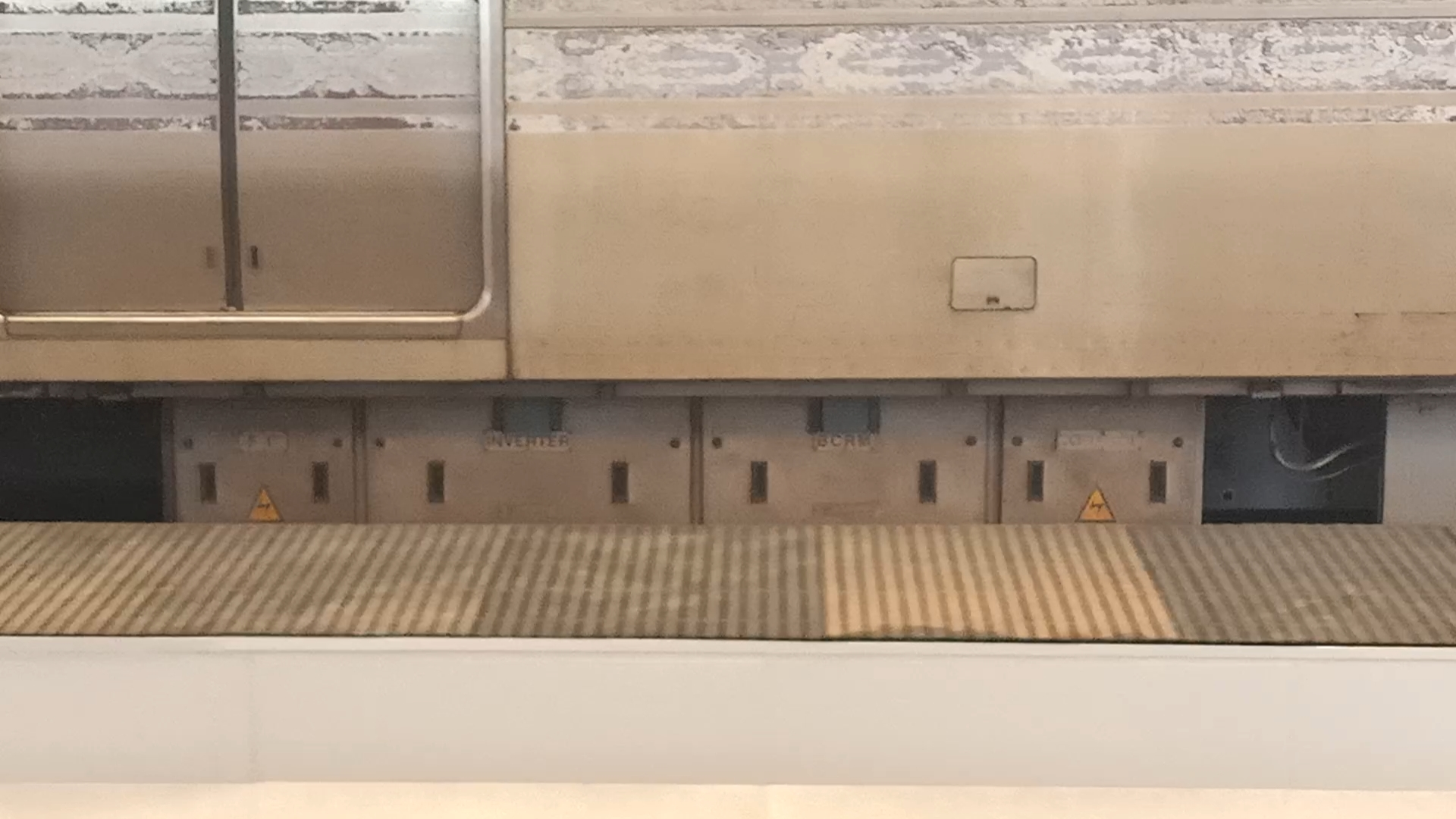
New VVVF inverter from Woojin Industrial Systems

== Train formation ==
The configuration of a four-car trainset is Mc1–M1–M2–Mc2. All cars are powered and equipped with traction motors; Mc denotes a driving car while M denotes an intermediate car.

Cars of 2000 class
Car type		Mc	M
Quantity		2	
Control cab		Yes	No
Motor		Yes	Yes
VVVF inverter		Yes	Yes
Pantograph		No	Yes
Car length	m	23.3	
Car length	ft in	76 ft 5.3 in	
Capacity	Seated	54	64
Capacity	Standing	338	360
Capacity	Total	392	422

== Fleet list ==
Set No.	1	2	3	4	Status
1	2001	2002	2003	2004	Active
2	2005	2006	2007	2008	No plans to repair
3	2009	2010	2011	2060	Active
4	2013	2014	2015	2016	Active
5	2017	2018	2019	2020	No plans to repair
6	2021	2022	2023	2024	No plans to repair
7	2025	2026	2027	2012	No plans to repair
8	2029	2030	2031	2032	Active
9	2033	2034	2035	2036	Active
10	2037	2038	2039	2056	No plans to repair
11	2041	2042	2043	2044	No plans to repair
12	2045	2046	2047	2048	No plans to repair
13	2049	2050	2051	2052	Active
14	2053	2054	2055	2040	Active
15	2057	2058	2059	2028	No plans to repair
16	2061	2062	2063	2064	Active
17	2065	2066	2067	2068	Active
18	2069	2070	2071	2072*	Active

- Current Car 2072, and 2049 was formerly 2048 and 2045 of Trainset 12, replaced after the 2019 Accident

== Incidents ==
- On May 18, 2019, two trains collided between Araneta Center-Cubao and Anonas, injuring 34 passengers with none in critical condition. The incident started at 2:09 p.m. when trainset no. 13 broke down at Katipunan station after the train's static inverters, which powers the electrical and braking systems, failed. The defective train was subsequently moved to the pocket track near Anonas station, waiting to be towed back to the depot. However at 9:15 p.m., the train was reported to have moved on its own towards the eastbound track going towards Santolan station, after its air pressure slowly dissipated, causing the brake shoes of train no. 13 to loosen. The downward slope of the pocket track also caused the train to move on its own. At this time, trainset no. 18 was going towards Santolan station from Araneta Center-Cubao on the same track. The runaway train was reported via radio but eventually rear-ended train no. 13. The driver of one of the two trains was reported to have jumped out of his train before the collision, sustaining wounds and bruises. Revenue operations were suspended to give way for maintenance checks; operations resumed at 10:47 a.m. the next day. Both trains involved were subsequently repaired and returned to service in September 2021.
- On September 15, 2025, around 11:00pm, a 2000 class train derailed whilst arriving at Santolan station, causing damage to both train and the tracks which resulted in limited operations between Recto station and Araneta Center–Cubao station the following day, before it resumed full operations at 7:30am.

== See also ==
- Korail Class 311000
- Korail Class 341000
- Korail Class 351000
- LRTA 1100 class
- PNR Hyundai Rotem DMU

== Sources ==
- Department of Transportation and Communications; Light Rail Transit Authority (September 2014). LRT LINE 2 OPERATIONS AND MAINTENANCE PROJECT (PDF) (Report). Public-Private Partnership Center, Philippines.
- Hyundai Rotem (2011). Hyundai Rotem's Experiences and New Solutions (Report). Hyundai Rotem Company. Archived from the original on February 24, 2022.
- Japan International Cooperation Agency; Oriental Consultants Co., Ltd.; Katahira & Engineers International; Tonichi Engineering Consultants, Inc. (October 2011). PREPARATORY STUDY FOR LRT LINE2 EXTENSION PROJECT FINAL REPORT (PDF) (Report).
- Light Rail Transit Authority (August 9, 2017). "Maintenance of the Manila LRT Line 2 System, Terms of Reference" (PDF). Archived from the original (PDF) on June 12, 2020.
- Light Rail Transit Authority (July 29, 2020a). "Bidding Documents - Contract for the Supply of Various Spare Parts (Static Inverter IGBT, Static Inverter Gate Drive Unit, and SIV Fuse)" (PDF). Archived from the original (PDF) on February 18, 2022.
- Light Rail Transit Authority (August 27, 2020b). "Bidding of the Design-and-Build Contract for One (1) Lot for LRT Line 2 West Extension Project" (PDF). Archived from the original (PDF) on December 15, 2023.
- Light Rail Transit Authority (March 2022). Year-End Accomplishment Report (CY 2021) (PDF) (Report).
