= D'Antona (name) =

D'Antona, D'antona, or d'Antona is a surname. Notable people with these names include:

- Antonino D'Antona (1842–1913), Italian physician and politician
- Jamie D'Antona (born 1982), American baseball infielder

== See also ==
- D'Antona (disambiguation)
- Vince Dantona
- D'Anton Lynn
- D'Antoni
