= Dantoni =

Dantoni may refer to:

- D'Antoni, Italian surname

== See also ==
- D'Antonio, Italian surname
