= Dantone =

Dantone is a surname. Notable people with the surname include:

- Joseph J. Dantone (born 1942), U.S. Navy official
- Ottavio Dantone (born 1960), Italian conductor and keyboardist

== See also ==
- D'Antoni
