= Dantonio =

Dantonio is an American surname of Italian origin. Notable people with the surname include:

- Fats Dantonio (1918–1993), Major League Baseball catcher for the Brooklyn Dodgers
- Mark Dantonio (born 1956), American football coach

== See also ==
- D'Antonio, Italian surname
- di Antonio, Italian surname
- Emile de Antonio
