= Antona (name) =

Antona is a surname. Notable people with this name include the following:

== Middle name ==
- Derek Antona Traversi, known as Derek A. Traversi (1912 – 2005), British literary critic

== Surname ==
- Andreas Antona (born 1957), British chef and restaurateur
- Nuria Bermúdez Antona, known as Nuria Bermúdez (born 1980), Spanish football agent and actress
- Piero Antona (1912 – 1969), Italian football player

== See also ==
- Antona (disambiguation)
- Antoan
- Anton (given name)
- Anton (surname)
- Antone
- Antonia (name)
- Antono (name)
- Antuna
- Vince Dantona
- Fernando Antogna
