= Antona (disambiguation) =

Antona is a genus of moths.

Antona may also refer to

- Antona (name)
- USS Antona, disambiguation of two US Navy ships
  - USS Antona (1863), formerly a British steamer of the same name
  - USS Antona (IX-133), an unclassified vessel of the United States Navy

== See also ==
- Altona (disambiguation)
- Annona (disambiguation)
- Anona (disambiguation)
- D'Antona (disambiguation)
- Antonia (disambiguation)
