= Araneta City Bus Port =

Public transport terminal in Quezon City, Philippines

- The bus port entrance from General Romulo Avenue

General information
- Location: 160 General Romulo Avenue, Quezon City, Metro Manila; Philippines
- Coordinates: 14°37′15″N 121°3′26″E
- Owner: Araneta City, Inc.
- Operator: Araneta City, Inc.
- Bus stands: 19 bays
- Bus operators: ALPS The Bus; German Espiritu Liner Inc.; German Espiritu Liner; Pangasinan Solid North Transit, Inc.; R.J. Express; UBE Express
- Connections: Transfers to intercity and provincial buses, jeepneys, and UV Express; Araneta Center-Cubao; Araneta Center-Cubao; 51 53 Farmers Plaza; 1 Cubao; Future: E Cubao

Construction
- Structure type: Surface building
- Parking: Yes
- Cycle facilities: Yes
- Accessible: Yes

Other information
- Website: Official website

History
- Opened: March 14, 2017
- Former names: Araneta Center Bus Port

Passengers
- 400-700 daily average
Location

The Araneta City Bus Port (ACBP), also styled Araneta City Busport, is a bus station in Quezon City, Philippines. The bus station is currently one of two bus terminals in the Araneta City business district that link Metro Manila with the provinces in the country, including cities in the Luzon Archipelago via the Philippine Nautical Highway System.

Built and completed in 2017 as the modern alternative to, and eventual replacement for, the adjacent Araneta City Bus Terminal, the oldest integrated bus terminal in Metro Manila, in operation since 1993, and is also a hub for buses servicing the Bicol Region. The busport is used by inter-city and provincial bus lines. The terminal is connected to the LRT Line 2 and MRT Line 3 by a network of elevated walkways and mall connections.

== Location ==
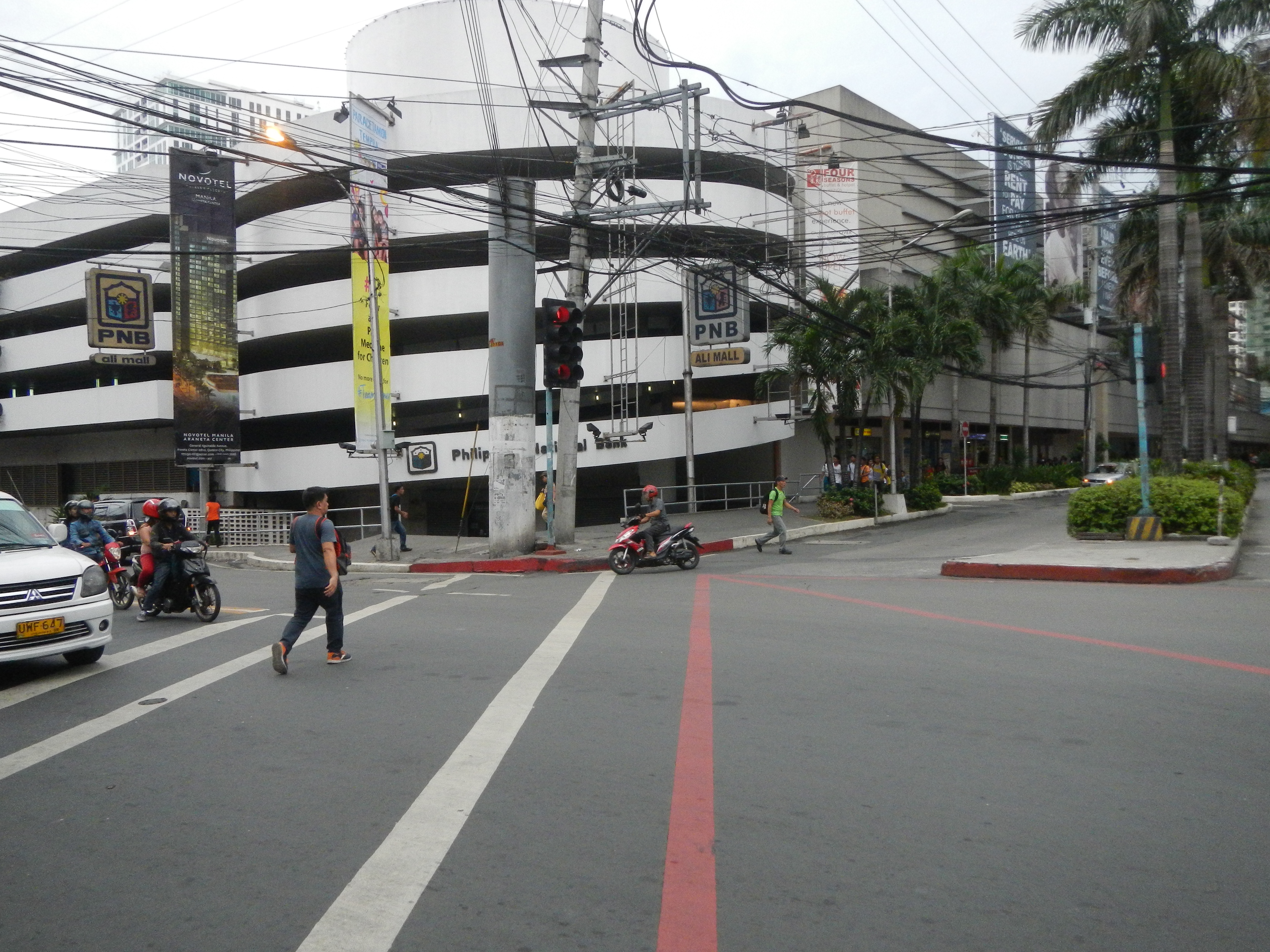
General Romulo Avenue alongside Ali Mall

The Araneta City Bus Port is located along General Romulo Avenue on the eastern side of Araneta City within the barangay of Socorro, Quezon City. It occupies the ground level of Manhattan Heights, a four-tower residential condominium complex that is part of the 5.7-hectare (14-acre), 18-tower highrise community developed by Megaworld Corporation called Manhattan Gardens. The bus station is situated in the district of Cubao, a densely populated area north of Ortigas Center in east-central Metro Manila that has the highest density of bus terminals in the entire Manila metropolitan area. It is directly across from Ali Mall and one block from the old Araneta bus station on Times Square Avenue.

== History ==
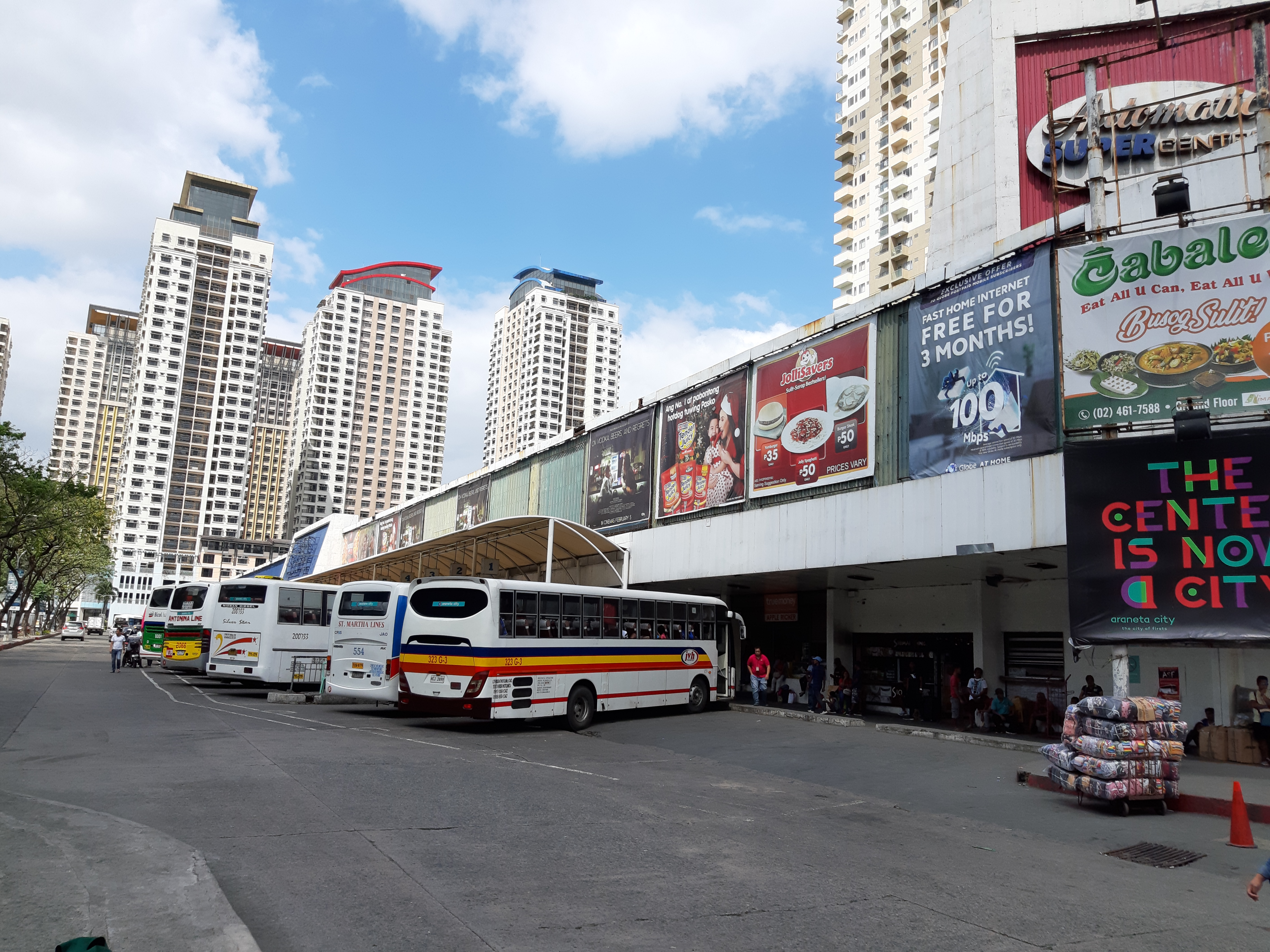
The old Araneta bus terminal on Times Square Avenue in 2020 before the fire.

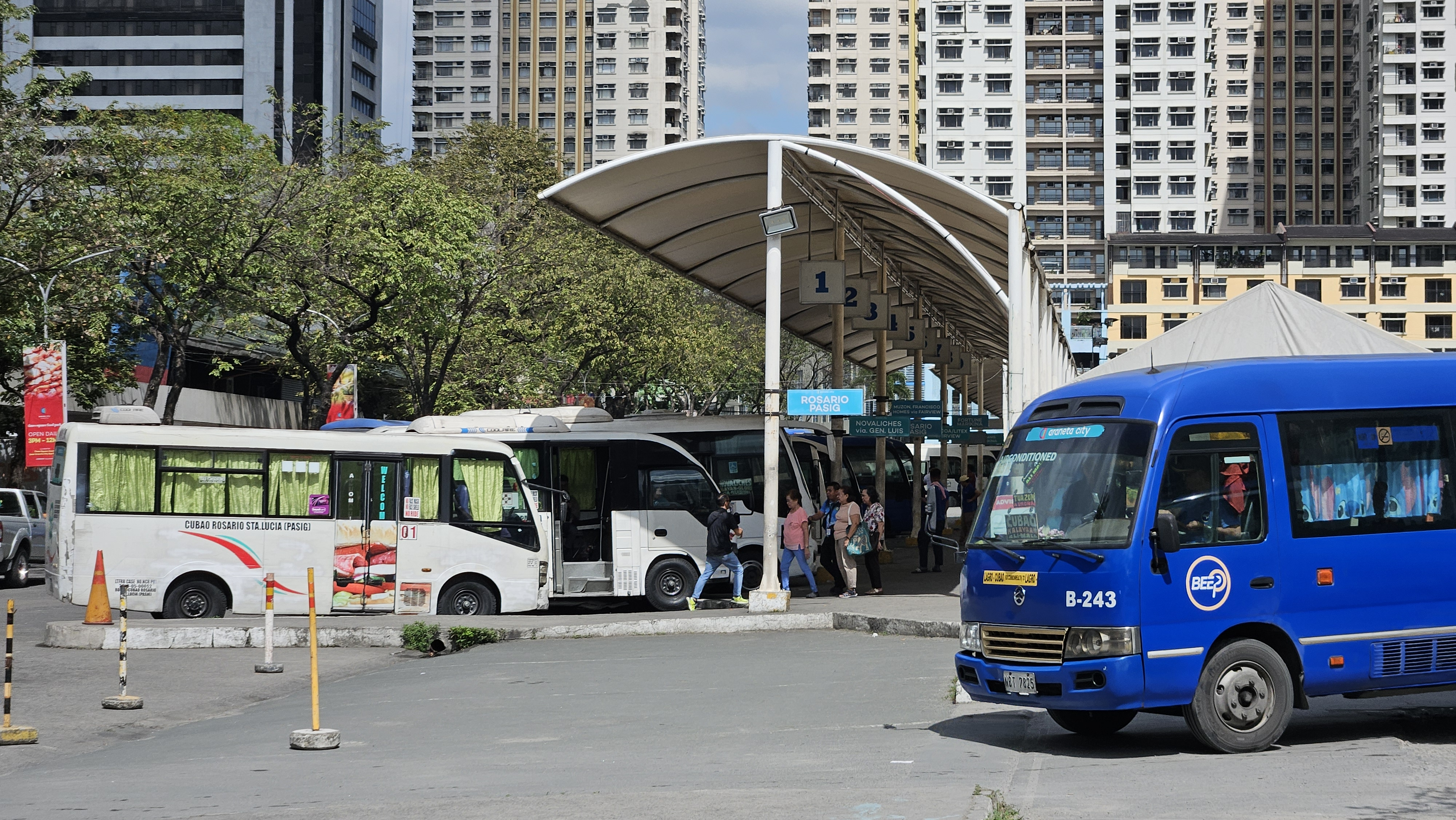
Old Araneta bus terminal with modern jeepneys in 2025.

The Araneta busport sits on the original location of Metro Manila's first integrated terminal which opened in 1993. In 2011, the Araneta Center Bus Station was relocated to the old Rustan's building located on Times Square Avenue built in 1974, after the department store transferred to its new home at the newly opened Gateway Mall in 2005, to make way for the construction of the Manhattan Heights, a 4-tower condominium development, as part of the Manhattan Gardens complex. The old bus terminal is expected to be torn down in the future to make way for the construction of the Manhattan Plaza, the final highrise development of the Manhattan Gardens project.

The modern busport at Manhattan Heights was inaugurated as the Araneta Center Bus Port in March 2017 with Vice President Leni Robredo in attendance. Following the issuance of the Metro Manila Council regulation prohibiting the operation of all provincial bus terminals along EDSA in order to ease traffic congestion in Manila's main artery, the Metropolitan Manila Development Authority announced in May 2019 that the Araneta bus terminal shall be exempt from the ban. During this period, the busport was also catering an average of 6,000-12,000 passengers daily.

In March 2020, the terminal was closed due the COVID-19 pandemic, and served as an RT-PCR COVID-19 saliva testing site, in partnership with the Philippine Red Cross, while transport services were temporarily moved to the old Araneta City Bus Station, which has 23 bays. The old bus terminal reopened in September 2020, and has limited its operations to Central Luzon, and has gradually expanded its services, while reviving previous routes within 2021 to 2022. As of 2021, the Araneta Group have no announcement for the bus port's reopening, and is currently being utilized as a parking facility.

On October 25, 2022, the Araneta Group announced that all inter-city and provincial buses will be moved out from the Araneta City Bus Station, and will relocate their operations to the Araneta Bus Port. The day after the announcement, October 26, the Araneta City Bus Port reopened its operations, and services routes within areas around Metro Manila, Bulacan, Pampanga, Tabuk, Laguna, and Batangas. Presently, the Araneta City Bus Station is used to service modern jeepneys (BEEP) to and from select destinations in Quezon City, Pasig, and the Province of Rizal, under the Transport Equipment Aggregator and Management Inc. (1-TEAM), and other various transport cooperatives. At present, the busport serves a total of 400-700 average daily passengers due to the long-term effects caused by the COVID-19 pandemic and the rearrangement and transferring of services of major bus lines to their respective bus terminals within Cubao and other key transport hubs in Metro Manila, which included the Parañaque Integrated Terminal Exchange.

== Services ==
As of September 2024, the Araneta City Bus Port services the following routes:

=== Provincial ===
==== Bus ====
- ALPS The Bus & Gold Star Transport, Inc. – operate to and from three destinations in Batangas, namely San Juan, Batangas City, and Lipa.
- German Espiritu Liner Inc. - operate to and from two destinations in Bulacan, namely Bocaue and Bulakan, Bulacan.
- Goldstar Transport- operate to and from Lipa, Batangas and Batangas International Port
- HM Transport Inc. - operate to and from Santa Cruz, Laguna.
- JAC Liner - operate to and from Calamba, Laguna and Lucena, Quezon
- JAM Liner - operate to and from Lipa, Batangas and Lucena, Quezon
- Pangasinan Solid North Transit, Inc. - operate to and from Baguio City.
- Philippine Rabbit Bus Lines, Inc. - operates to and from three destinations in Pampanga, namely Dau in Mabalacat, San Fernando, and Angeles City.
- R.J. Express, Inc. - operate to and from two destinations in Pampanga, namely San Fernando and Arayat.

=== Intercity ===
==== Bus ====
- UBE Express operates Premium Point-to-Point Bus Service to Ninoy Aquino International Airport.
- Mega Manila Consortium Corporation operates 4 bus routes under the rationalized bus transit system, and offers buses passing to and from Antipolo, bus route number 51 bound for Valenzuela, and bus route number 53 bound for Pacita Complex (San Pedro) respectively.

==== Jeep & Shuttle Services ====
- Araneta City, Inc. operates electric-powered city shuttles (e-shuttles, also known as Green & Go) to destinations within the Araneta City district from Ali Mall to the LRT 2 Cubao Station Concourse and the Gateway Mall 2 Southern Entrance. The Bus Port served as the shuttle's parking garage before reopening its services in November 2022.

=== Nearby Transport Services ===
Other transport terminals are located within walking distance from the Araneta Bus Port, which includes the following:

- Traditional jeeps operate from the Araneta City Jeepney Terminal further north along General Romulo Avenue to Calumpang, Camp Crame, Lagro, and Project 4; and in major cities and municipalities in Rizal including Angono, Antipolo, Cainta, Silangan (San Mateo), and Taytay. Some jeepneys going to Divisoria, Sta. Mesa, Quiapo and Remedios in Manila, Parang, and SSS Village in Marikina, and Cogeo, and Padilla in Antipolo operate along Aurora Blvd below the LRT 2-Gateway Mall Station Concourse.
- Modernized jeepneys operate from the old Araneta City Bus Terminal at Times Square Avenue to Fairview, Novaliches, Eastwood City, Roces Avenue, and Project 4 in Quezon City, Rosario and Sta. Lucia in Pasig City, Parang, SSS Village, and Calumpang in Marikina, San Rafael, and Kasiglahan Village in Montalban, Muzon in San Jose Del Monte, Deparo in Caloocan, Cogeo, Padilla, and Antipolo Cathedral in Antipolo.
- UV Express vehicles within Farmers Plaza (both within General Roxas Avenue Terminal and Central Avenue Terminal) bound for selected areas in Quezon City (Novaliches), Northern Caloocan (Deparo), Bulacan (Malolos), Laguna (namely San Pedro, Balibago, Santa Rosa, and Santa Rosa) and the province of Rizal (namely Rodriguez, Cogeo/Padilla, and Antipolo).
- Farmers Plaza Bus Stop serving buses under the old route 9 (now route 3 bound for Robinsons Antipolo) and bus route number 61 bound for Dasmariñas also terminates in this bus stop.
- MRT Line 3 (Araneta Center–Cubao station)
- LRT Line 2 (Araneta Center–Cubao station)

=== Suspended due to the COVID-19 pandemic ===
The following bus companies moved out from the Araneta City Bus Station primarily due to declining ridership due to the effects of the COVID-19 pandemic and caused bus companies to shift their operations within their own terminals within Cubao until 2023, or moved most of their operations to the Parañaque Integrated Terminal Exchange:

- ALPS The Bus – originally serving several destinations within Batangas, Bicol Region and Iloilo City.
- Ceres Transport – operates provincial buses to several destinations in Batangas & parts of Western Visayas, including Malay and Kalibo in Aklan, San Jose de Buenavista, Antique, Roxas, Capiz and Iloilo City.
- CUL Transport – services the routes to Sorsogon, Leyte and Southern Leyte including Sorsogon City, Tacloban, Ormoc, Baybay and Maasin.
- Diamond Bus – operates to and from select destinations in Samar.
- DLTBCo – operates provincial buses to and from the following destinations in the Bicol Region and Eastern Visayas: Legazpi, Daet, Ormoc, Borongan and Catarman.
- Elavil Bus Company – operates provincial buses to several destinations in Northern Samar.
- Philtranco – serves the terminal on its route to several destinations in the Bicol Region via its main terminal in Pasay.
- Silver Star Shuttle & Tours – operates bus services to and from Samar, Eastern Samar, Leyte and Bohol, including Calbayog, Catbalogan, Guiuan, Tacloban and Tagbilaran.
- Provincial Buses like Amihan, Belleza, Bobis Liner, Cagsawa Travel, JVH, Megabus, Raymond Transportation and RSL operate to and from several destinations in the Bicol Region.
- Pangasinan Solid North Transit, Inc. – runs several routes from Araneta City Bus Port to destinations in Pampanga, Tarlac, Pangasinan, and Baguio. destinations in the Bicol Region, including Masbate.
- ES Transport – operate to and from destinations in Cabanatuan and Tabuk.
- HM Transport Inc. – operate to and from three destinations in Laguna, namely Calamba, Los Baños, and Pansol.
