= Annona (disambiguation) =

Annona is a plant genus.

Annona may also refer to:

- Annona (mythology), personification of the produce of the yearly harvest in ancient Roman religion
  - Cura Annonae, the grain supply to the city of Rome
  - Praefectus annonae, official responsible for the grain supply to the city of Rome
- Anonas station (Line 2), a train station in Quezon City, Philippines
- Annona, Texas, a settlement in Red River County, Texas
- Annona (crater), in the southern hemisphere of the dwarf planet Ceres

== See also ==
- Antona (disambiguation)
