= D'Antona =

D'Antona, D'antona, d'Antona or Dantona may refer to the following:

== People ==
- D'Antona (name)

== Other ==
- Dantona, genus of moths
- Buovo d'Antona, Italian translation of Bevis of Hampton
- Buovo d'Antona (Traetta), Italian opera about the Bevis of Hampton

== See also ==
- Antona (disambiguation)
