= Aenona =

Aenona may refer to:

- Nin (Latin: Aenona), town in Croatia
- Aenona, genus in the Tellinidae family of molluscs

== See also ==
- Anona (disambiguation)
