= Araneta Center–Cubao station (LRT) =

LRT Line 2 station in Quezon City

Araneta Center–Cubao
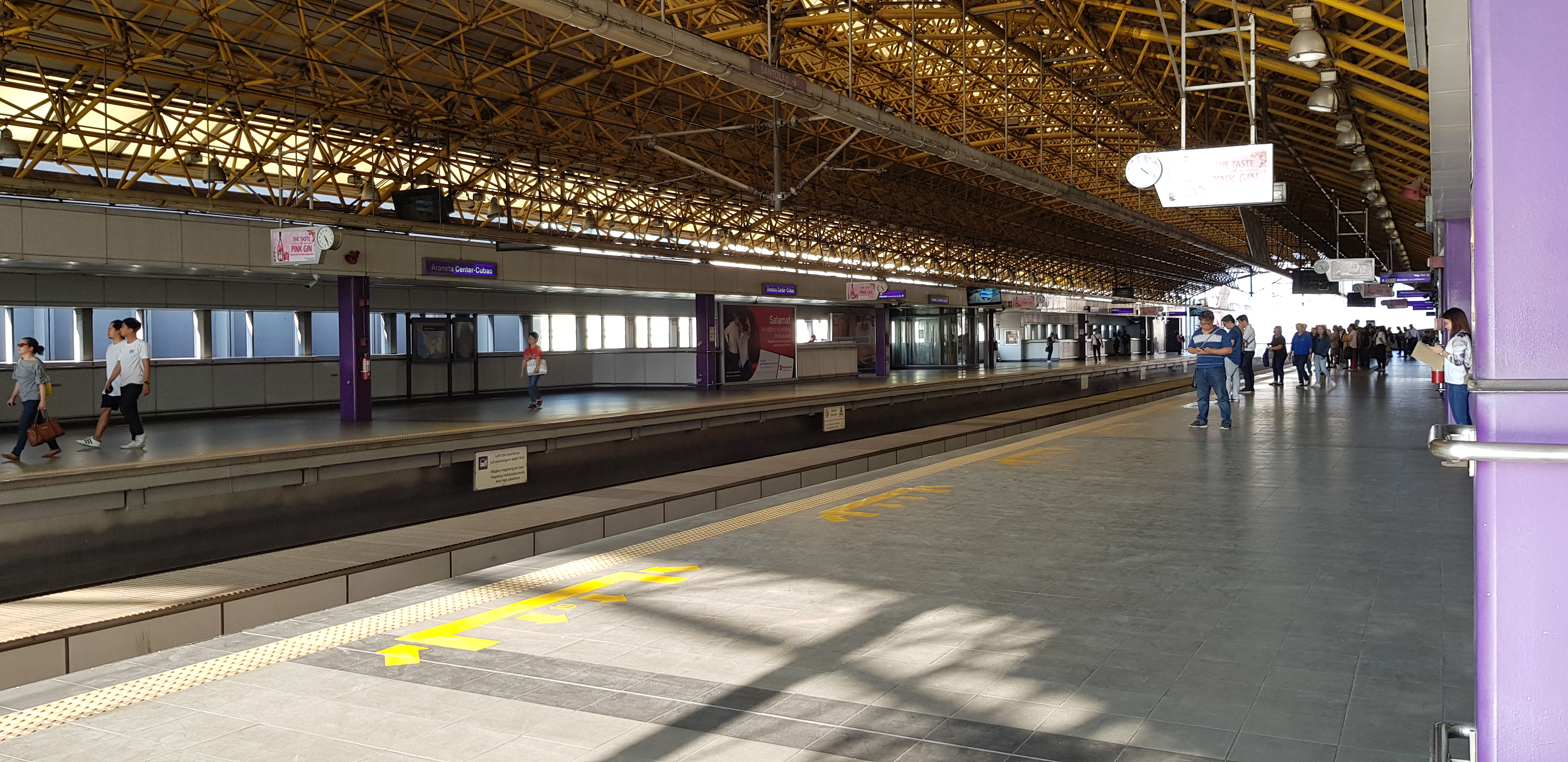

General information
- Other names: Araneta–Cubao; Cubao
- Location: Aurora Boulevard, Cubao; Quezon City, Metro Manila; Philippines
- Coordinates: 14°37′21.64″N 121°03′09.49″E
- Owner: Department of Transportation
- Operator: Light Rail Transit Authority
- Line: LRT Line 2
- Platforms: 3 (3 side)
- Tracks: 3
- Connections: Araneta Center–Cubao; 3 Gateway Mall; 51 53 Farmers Plaza; 61 Araneta City Bus Port; 1 Araneta City; Future: E Cubao

Construction
- Structure type: Elevated
- Parking: Yes (Gateway Mall, Manhattan Parkway, Manhattan Garden City, Manhattan Tower 2)
- Accessible: Concourse: South Entrance only Platforms: All platforms

Other information
- Station code: PL08

History
- Opened: April 5, 2003; 23 years ago

Services
Preceding station	Manila LRT	Following station
Anonas towards Antipolo	LRT Line 2	Betty Go-Belmonte towards Recto
Out-of-system interchange
Preceding station	Manila MRT	Following station
GMA–Kamuning towards North Avenue	MRT Line 3 transfer at Araneta Center–Cubao	Santolan–Annapolis towards Taft Avenue
Track layout
Location
- Location within Metro Manila Location within Luzon Location within Philippines

Araneta Center–Cubao station is an elevated Light Rail Transit (LRT) station located on the LRT Line 2 (LRT-2) system in Cubao, Quezon City. It is named after the old name of Araneta City, a nearby mixed-use development.

The station is the eighth station for trains headed to Antipolo and the sixth station for trains headed to Recto.

The station layout is composed of three platforms: The two main platforms serve the entire system (eastbound and westbound) and an extra platform serves as a terminus. The extra platform, currently unused, is found under the main platforms where the concourse area can also be found.

== History ==
Araneta Center–Cubao station first commenced operations on April 5, 2003. It served as the initial western terminus of the line until Legarda station and five intermediate stations under Phase 2 opened on April 5, 2004. It temporarily regained its terminus status from October 8, 2019, to January 21, 2021, this time as the eastern terminus, due to a fire on October 3, 2019, that affected two rectifiers of the line between Anonas and Katipunan stations. Normal operations later resumed after the rectifiers were repaired.

== Nearby establishments ==
The most recognizable landmark that the station is located at is the Araneta City, which hosts shopping malls such as Ali Mall, Farmers Plaza and Gateway Mall, where the station's south entrance is located, as well as the Smart Araneta Coliseum. At the opposite side of the station is Project 5 or Barangay E. Rodriguez, the location of other shopping establishments such as DiviMart, Hansel Arcade and Diamond Arcade, as well as Cubao Elementary School. The station's concourse level is directly interconnected to Gateway Mall and Diamond Arcade.

== Transportation links ==
Due to its location at Araneta City, the station is located in a major transportation hub. Provincial buses stop at the Araneta City Bus Port within the complex, and jeepneys for various destinations all over Metro Manila (within Quezon City, Manila, Marikina, Pasig, and San Juan) and Rizal province (Angono, Antipolo, Cainta, Montalban, San Mateo, and Taytay), UV Express, taxis and tricycles are available upon request. Traffic regulations, however, prohibit tricycles on EDSA and Aurora Boulevard.

The station is also the transit point for commuters riding the Manila Metro Rail Transit System Line 3. It is connected to its namesake MRT station via Gateway Mall and Farmers Plaza.

== Gallery ==
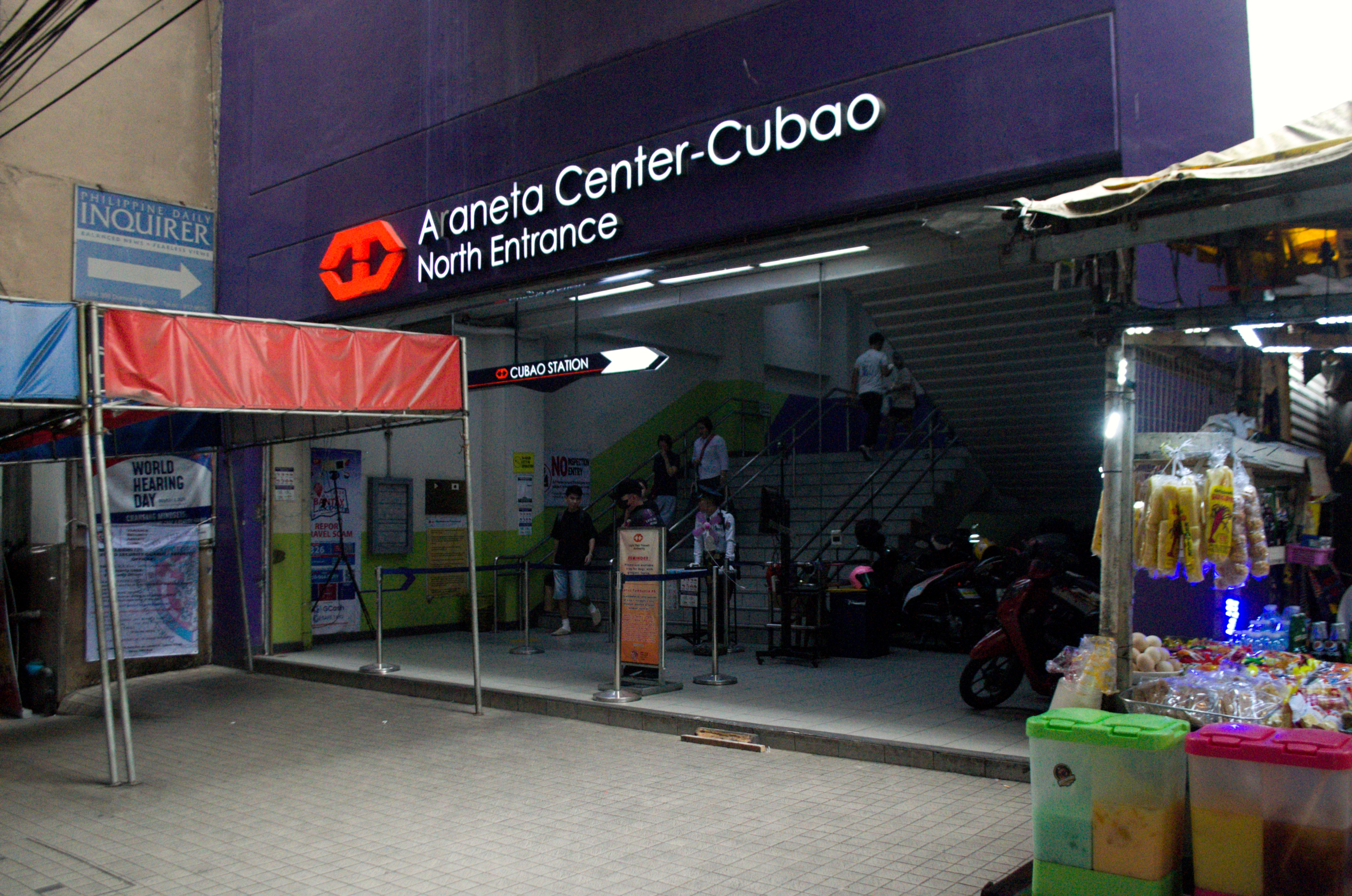
North entrance

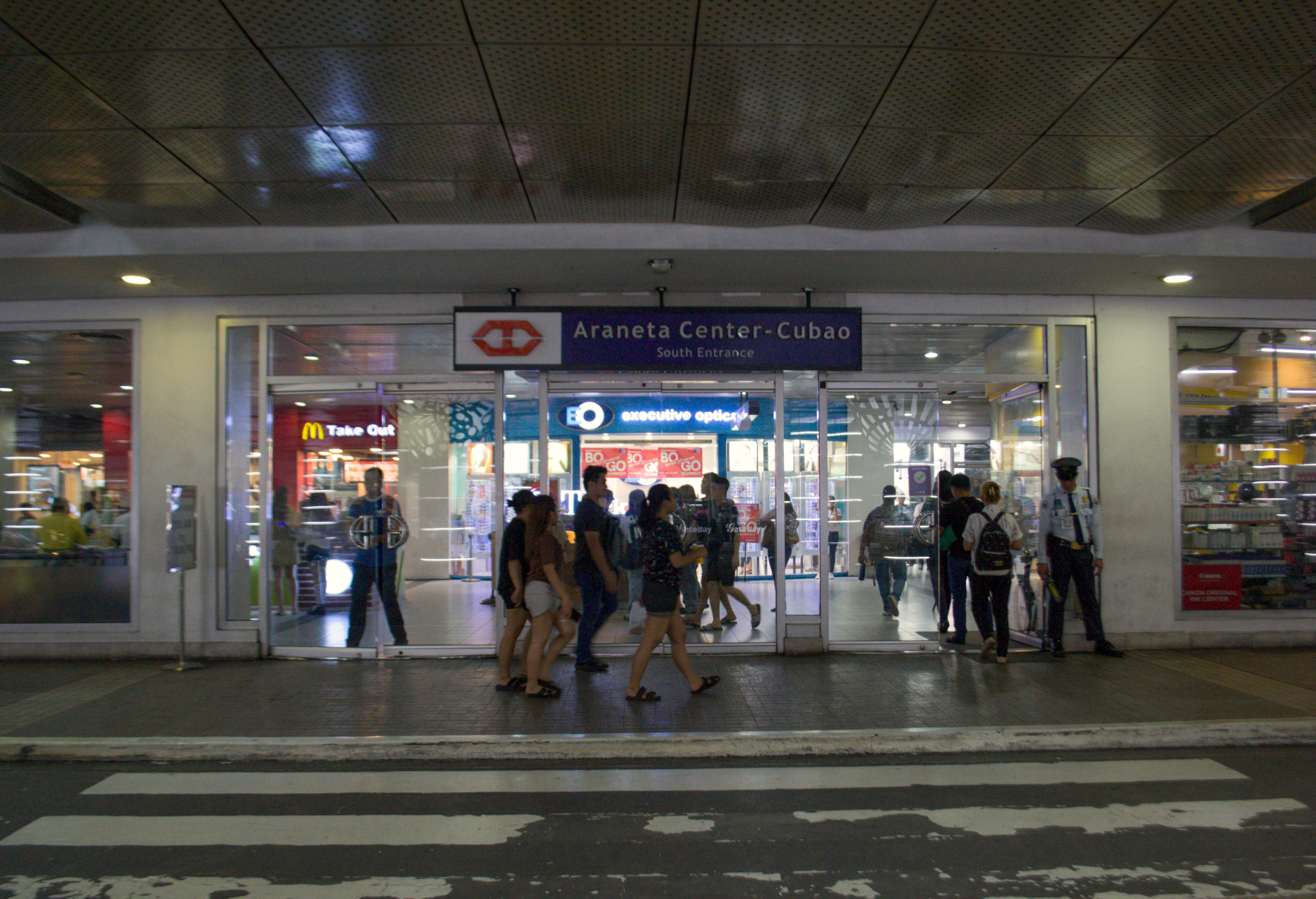
South entrance

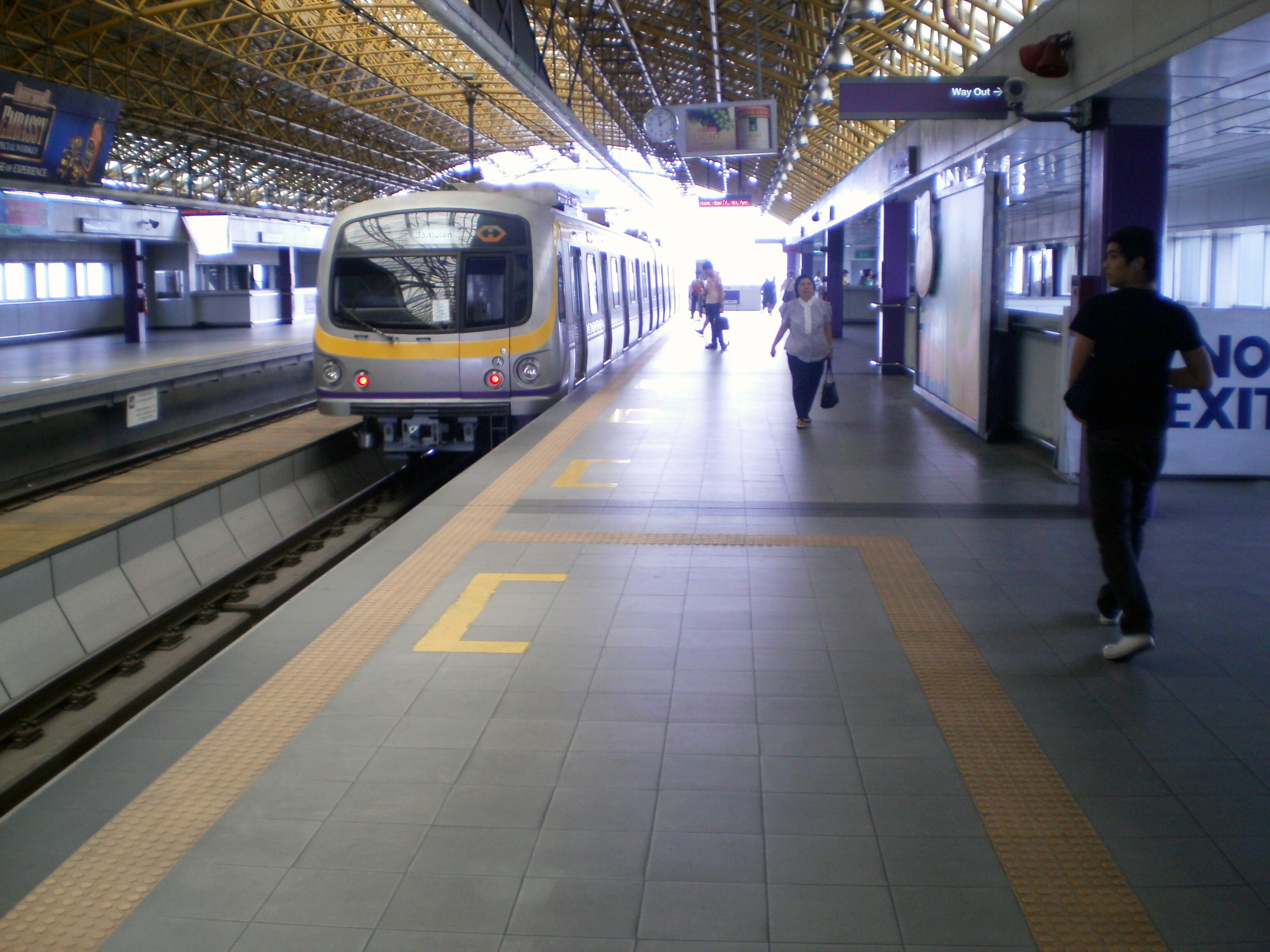
The station's platform area in 2011
