= D'Antonio =

D’Antonio or d'Antonio is a surname of Italian origin. It derived from the Antonius root name. Notable people with the surname include:

- Biagio d'Antonio (1446–1516), Italian Renaissance painter
- Gino D'Antonio (1927–2006), Italian comic writer and artist
- Michael D'Antonio (born 1955), American author and journalist
- Mike D'Antonio (contemporary), American metalcore musician
- Nunziata d'Antonio (1468–1525), Florentine artist
- Trent D'Antonio (born 1985), Australian professional baseball player
- Antonio di Nunziato d'Antonio, birthname of Anthony Toto, (1498–1554), Italian painter and architect

== See also ==
- D'Antoni, Italian surname
- Dantonio, Italian surname
- di Antonio, Italian surname
- Emile de Antonio
