= Vincenzo di Antonio Frediani =

Italian Renaissance painter

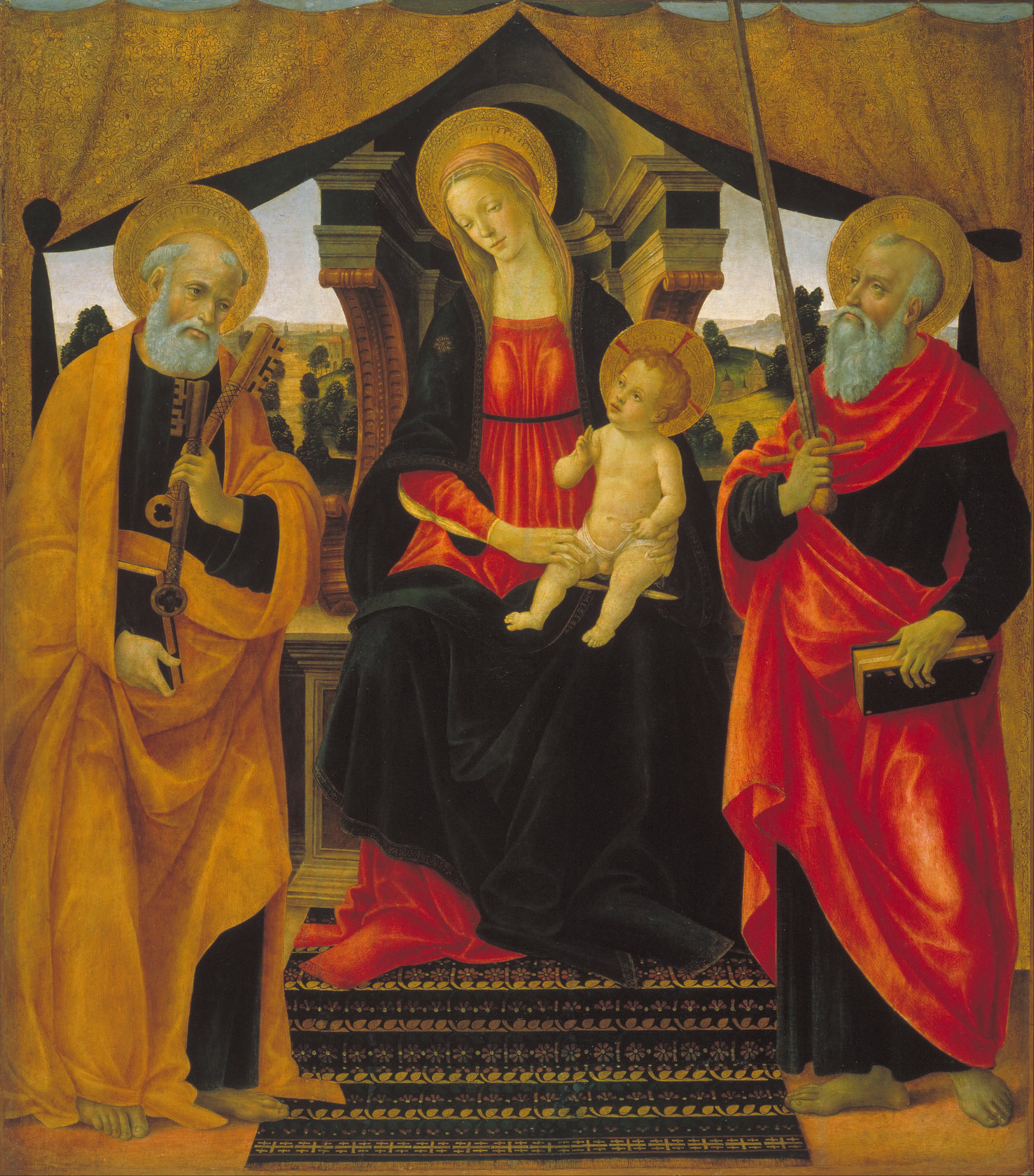
Virgin and Child Between Saints Peter and Paul, Barcelona, MNAC.

Vincenzo di Antonio Frediani (fl. 1481 - 1504) was an Italian Renaissance painter.

== Life and work ==
He belonged to a modest family from the city of Lucca and, according to local documents, was there between 1481 and 1505. He was associated with the Franciscan Order and, from 1498, held various positions at the Church of Santa Maria Corteorlandini. After 1500, until his death, he was Prior of the "Compagnia dei Disciplinati del Crocifisso".

He was directly influenced by Domenico Ghirlandaio and Filippino Lippi, who worked in Lucca during the early part of the 1490s, and indirectly by Sandro Botticelli, making him the first fully Renaissance painter in that area. His composition, in particular, owes much to Lippi. He also incorporated some Flemish elements into his works;

After 1481, the documentary record of his works is quite long, although many have since been lost. The high amounts paid for these works is testimony to the high opinion in which they were held. His workshop, managed by his brother, was always busy and, in 1490, there is record of their agreement to split the profits.

Although the exact date and place of his death is unknown, he was contracted, in 1505, to paint part of an altarpiece (depicting the Virgin and Child) at the Church of San Gennaro, which had to be completed by Ranieri di Leonardo da Pisa, presumably due to Frediani's death. Documents from this time also give his wife's name as Camilla and mention three sons, none of whom followed their father into his trade.
