= San Gennaro, Capannori =

Church building in Capannori, Italy

Coordinates: 43°53′58.83″N 10°38′19.06″E

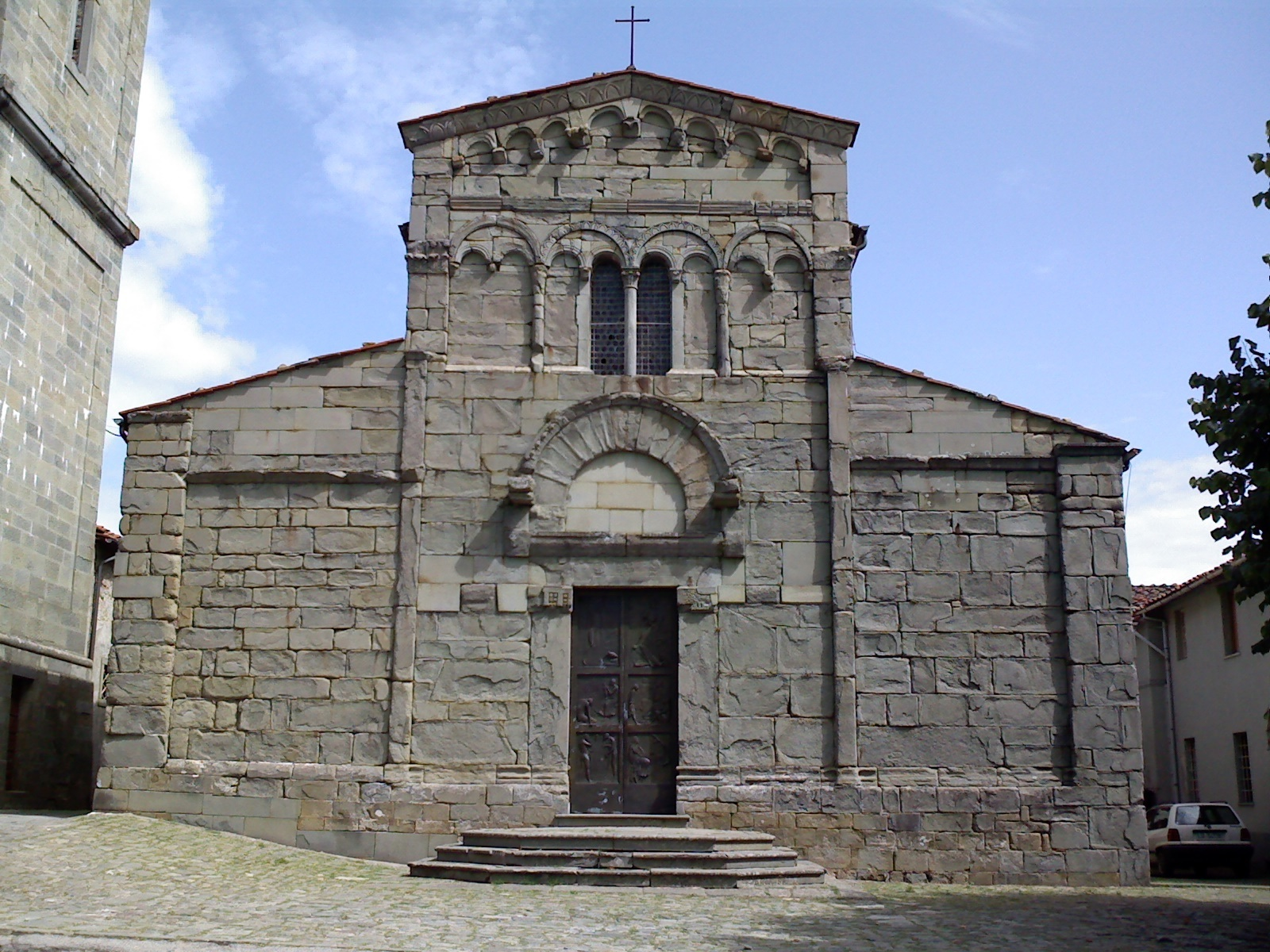
Pleban Church San Gennaro, Capannori, Italy

San Gennaro is 12th-century, Romanesque-style, Roman Catholic church in the neighborhood of San Gennaro in the town limits of Capannori, province of Lucca, region of Tuscany, Italy.

== History ==
The church was putatively founded at the site by the 9th century. The present layout dates to the 12th century. The three naves are separated by columns. The interior has undergone refurbishment over the centuries. The marble pulpit dates to 1162. In 1840, the bell-tower was reconstructed. Despite the facade portal still maintains some of the original romanesque sculptural decoration.
