= Anona, Florida =

Coordinates: 27°53′43″N 82°49′50″W

Anona is an unincorporated area in Pinellas County, Florida, United States.

== History ==
In 1883, Captain John Thomas Lowe made a landing here, with the town getting its name from Anona sweet apples from Key West. At first, it was going to be named Lowe's Landing, but its postmaster, from Cedar Key, suggested it be named Anona. In December 1883, the town gained a post office with Jefferson Lowe as its post master. There was a railroad spur that crossed the island here, allowing goods to be transported to and from it. The post office at the landing was converted to a general store for the residents. In 1872, the town got its first church, built by the residents with Reverend John Wells as its preacher. A year later, in 1873, a church board was formed, and a schoolhouse was likely operating there on weekdays. In 1882, a second church building was built and is still used today as part of a church. In 1900, the school was moved to the new building. In 1916, a bridge for cars and pedestrians was built across with a toll of 25 cents. The town was later on absorbed into Largo.
