= USS Antona =

Two ships of the United States Navy have been named USS Antona:

- USS Antona (1863), an iron-hulled British screw steamer built at Glasgow and captured by the U.S. Navy
- USS Antona (IX-133), an unclassified vessel of the United States Navy
