= Di Antonio =

di Antonio is an Italian surname. Notable people with the name include:

== Surname ==
- Antonello di Giovanni di Antonio, birthname of Antonello da Messina, (c. 1430 – February 1479), Italian painter

== Second name ==
- Filippo di Antonio Filippelli (1460–1506), Italian painter
- Francesco di Antonio del Chierico (1433–1484), Italian manuscript illuminator
- Vincenzo di Antonio Frediani (fl. 1481 – 1504), Italian painter
