= Anona, Ecuador =

Human settlement in Ecuador

Coordinates: 1°17′0″S 80°28′0″W

Location of Anona in Ecuador

Anona is a place in Jipijapa Canton, Manabí Province, Ecuador, South America.
