= D'Antoni =

D'Antoni is an Italian surname. It is derived from the root name Antonius. Notable people with the surname include:

- Alessandro D'Antoni (born 1988), Italian footballer
- Andrea D'Antoni (1811–1868), Italian painter
- Antonio d'Antoni (1801–1859), Italian opera composer and conductor
- Dan D'Antoni (born 1947), Italian-American basketball coach and former player, brother of Mike D'Antoni
- David D'Antoni (born 1979), Italian footballer
- Mike D'Antoni (born 1951), Italian-American NBA basketball coach and former player, brother of Dan D'Antoni
- Philip D'Antoni (1929–2018), American film producer

== See also ==
- D'Antona
- Deantoni Parks, musician
- D'Antonio, Italian surname
