= Anonas station =

LRT Line 2 station in Quezon City

Anonas
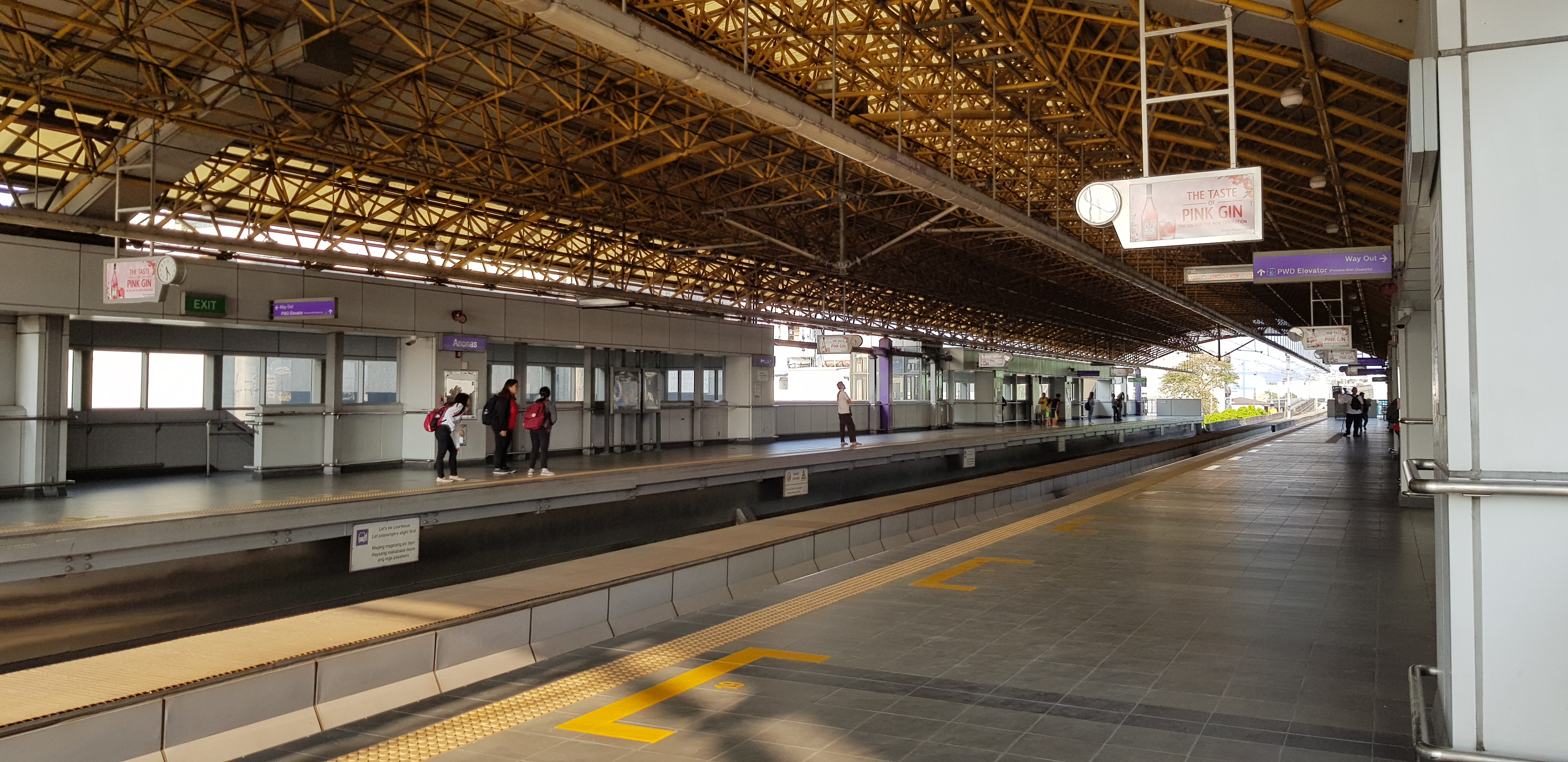

General information
- Location: Aurora Boulevard, Project 3 and Project 4, Quezon City, Metro Manila; Philippines
- Coordinates: 14°37′40.8″N 121°03′52.9″E
- Owner: Department of Transportation
- Operator: Light Rail Transit Authority
- Line: LRT Line 2
- Platforms: 2 (2 side)
- Tracks: 2
- Connections: 3 Anonas; 3 Anonas; Future: MMS Anonas

Construction
- Structure type: Elevated
- Parking: Yes (Anonas City Center)
- Accessible: Concourse: South Entrance only Platforms: All platforms

Other information
- Station code: PL09

History
- Opened: April 5, 2003; 23 years ago

Services
Preceding station	Manila LRT	Following station
Katipunan towards Antipolo	LRT Line 2	Araneta Center–Cubao towards Recto
Track layout
Location
- Location within Metro Manila Location within Luzon Location within Philippines

Anonas station is an elevated Light Rail Transit (LRT) station located on the LRT Line 2 (LRT-2) system in Cubao, Quezon City. It is named because of its location near Anonas Street.

The station is the ninth station for trains headed to Antipolo and the fifth station for trains headed to Recto.

== History ==
Anonas station was opened on April 5, 2003, as part of the initial section of LRT Line 2 between Araneta Center–Cubao and Santolan.

The station was temporarily closed due to a fire which affected two rectifiers of the train line between Anonas and Katipunan stations on October 3, 2019. The station was reopened on January 22, 2021 ,after repairs to the rectifiers were completed.

== Nearby landmarks ==
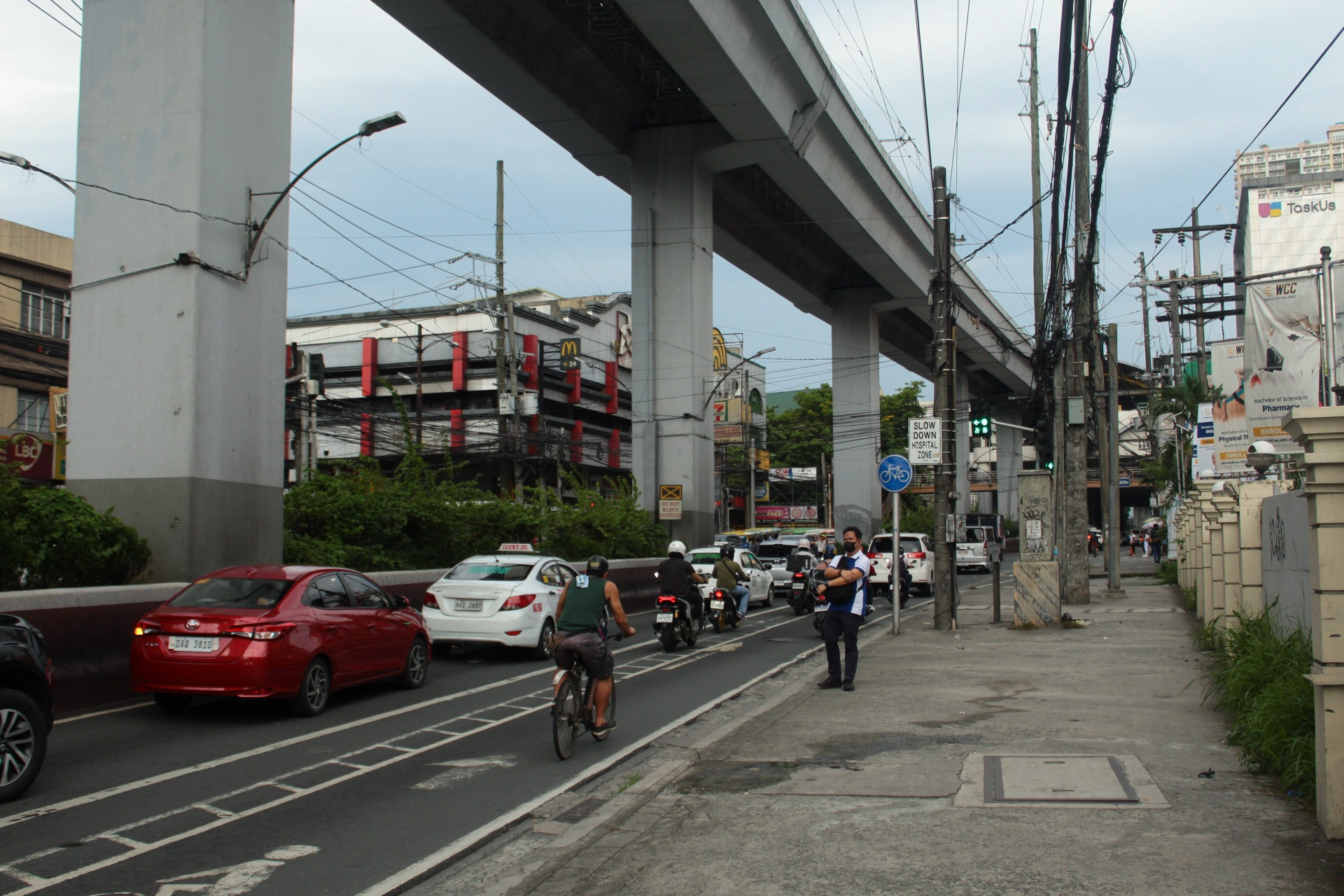
The area surrounding the station

In the immediate vicinity of the station various landmarks are located, with Anonas City Center being directly linked to the station itself. A church called St. Joseph Parish and the St. Joseph Catholic School is located nearby. Various educational institutions are located within a walking distance of the station, including but not limited to World Citi Medical Center and the Quezon City campus of the Technological Institute of the Philippines. Various groceries are nearby as well, such as Anson Supermart and Hi-Top Supermart.

== Transportation links ==
Buses, taxis, jeepneys, and tricycles can be used to navigate the area. Buses and jeepneys ply the Anonas Street and Aurora Boulevard routes. Commuters bound for Project 4 must use the southern exit to access Hi-Top Supermart and the National College of Business and Arts–Cubao. A tricycle terminal can be seen near Hi-Top Supermart that will bring the commuters to their desired destinations. A terminal for jeepneys headed to Quiapo and Quezon City Hall is located on Molave Street, accessible from the station's north exit and located a few meters away from the station.

A station on the Metro Manila Subway Line 9, also called Anonas station, is currently in development and will directly link to the LRT-2 station.

== See also ==
Exterior of station

- Manila Light Rail Transit System Line 2
