= Katipunan station =

LRT Line 2 station in Quezon City

Katipunan
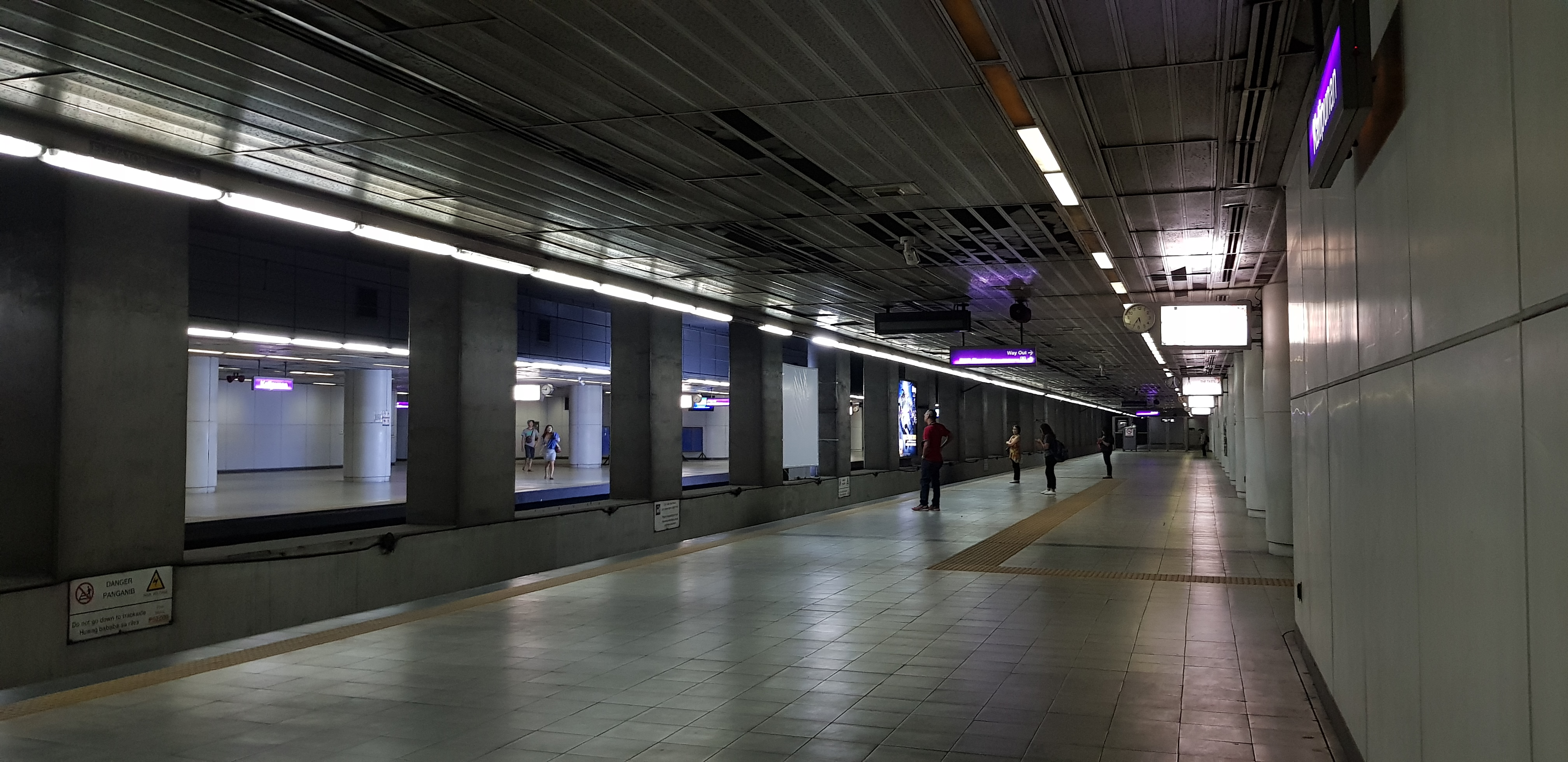

General information
- Location: Aurora Boulevard, Loyola Heights; Quezon City, Metro Manila; Philippines
- Coordinates: 14°37′51.95″N 121°04′22.65″E
- Owner: Department of Transportation
- Operator: Light Rail Transit Authority
- Line: LRT Line 2
- Platforms: 2 (2 side)
- Tracks: 2
- Connections: 3 Katipunan; 3 7 Aurora-Katipunan Interchange

Construction
- Structure type: Underground
- Accessible: Concourse: South Entrance only Platforms: All platforms

Other information
- Station code: PL10

History
- Opened: April 5, 2003; 23 years ago

Services
Preceding station	Manila LRT	Following station
Santolan towards Antipolo	LRT Line 2	Anonas towards Recto
Track layout
Location
- Location within Metro Manila Location within Luzon Location within Philippines

Katipunan station is an underground Light Rail Transit (LRT) station located on the LRT Line 2 (LRT-2) system in Loyola Heights, Quezon City. It is the only underground station in the entire line. The station is named because of its location near Katipunan Avenue, one of Quezon City's major thoroughfares. The avenue is in turn named after the Katipunan revolutionary society.

Katipunan station serves as the tenth station for trains headed to Antipolo and the fourth station for trains headed to Recto.

This station should not be confused with the planned Katipunan station of the Metro Manila Subway Line 9, to be built on Camp Aguinaldo property near the other end of Katipunan Avenue, also in Quezon City.

The station was temporarily closed due to a fire which affected two rectifiers located between the Katipunan and Anonas stations on October 3, 2019. The station was reopened on January 22, 2021 after repairs to the rectifiers were completed.

== Nearby landmarks ==
The station's south entrance is located beside the Philippine School of Business Administration, while the north entrance is adjacent to St. Bridget School.

Because of its location near Katipunan Avenue, the station is also proximate to the Ateneo de Manila University.

Commuters also get off at Katipunan station to ride a jeepney or tricycle to the University of the Philippines Diliman and Miriam College, both of which lie on Katipunan Avenue.

== Transportation links ==
Buses, taxis, jeepneys and tricycles are used to navigate the Katipunan area. Commuters headed to the area's universities, such as Ateneo de Manila, Miriam College, and University of the Philippines Diliman, have to transfer to reach the campuses, since they lie some distance from the station.

A bus stop for Quezon City Bus Service Route 3 can be found right outside the station's north entrance.

== Gallery ==
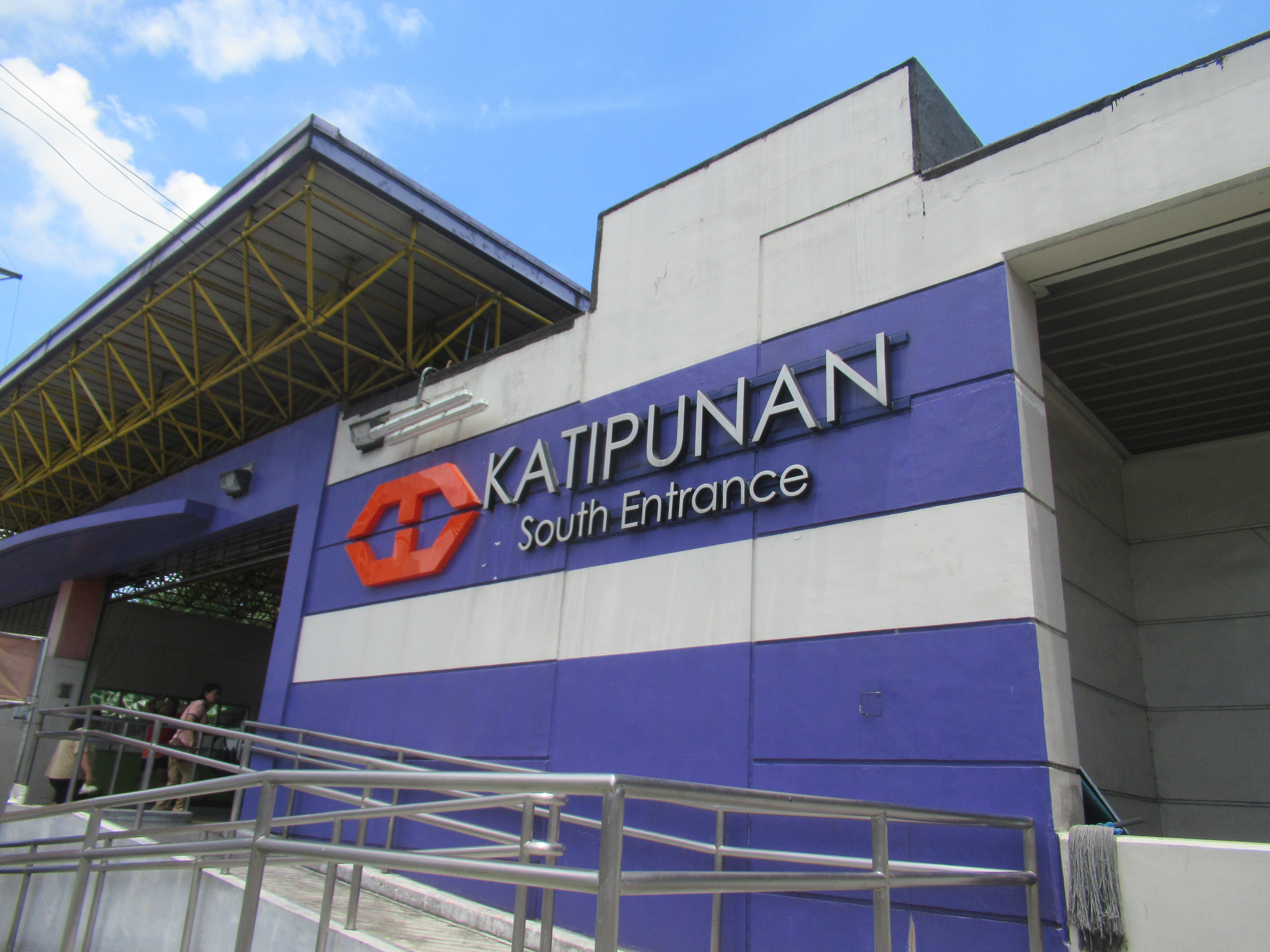
South entrance's updated facade in 2023

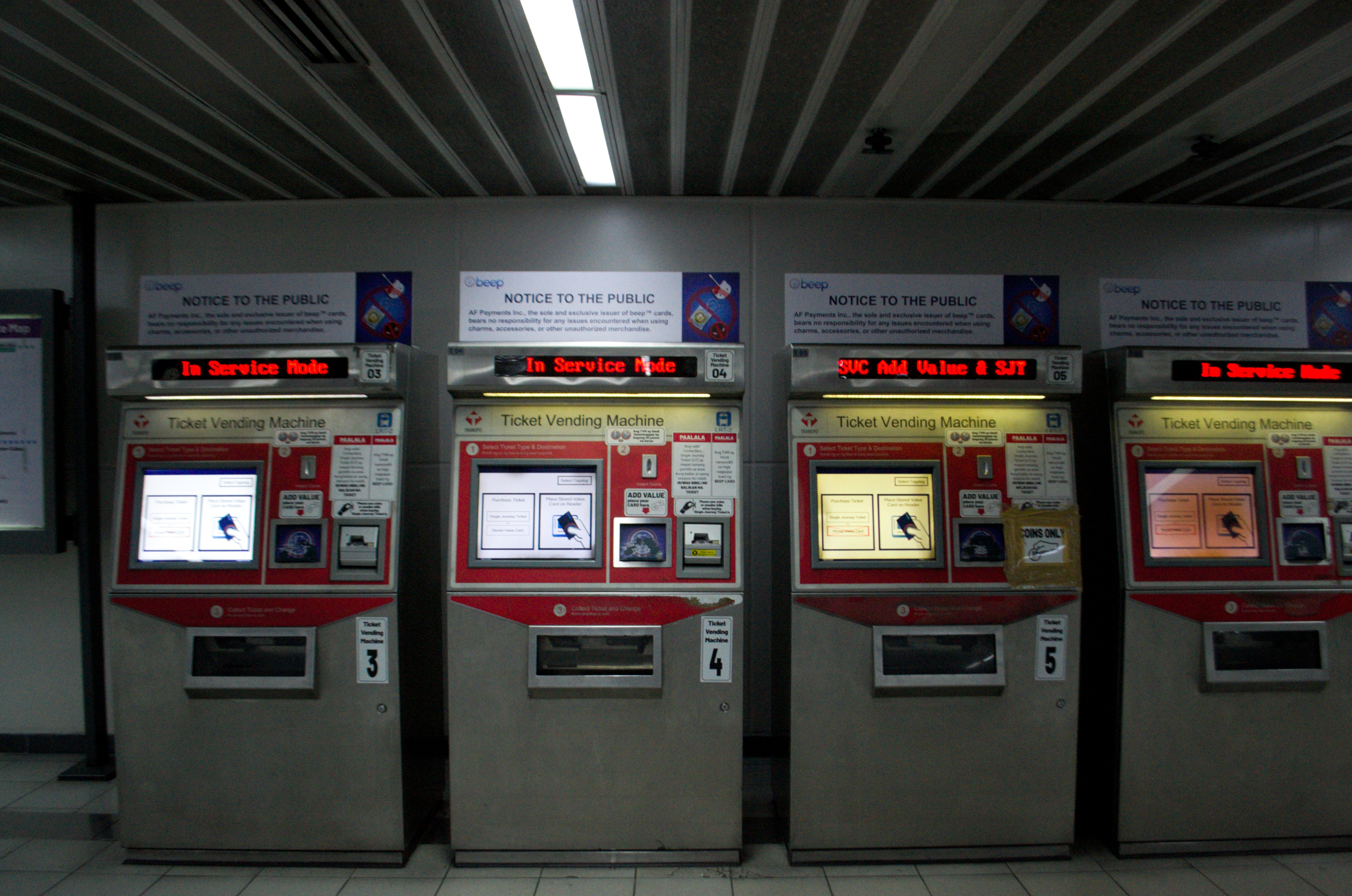
Ticket vending machines at the concourse level of the station

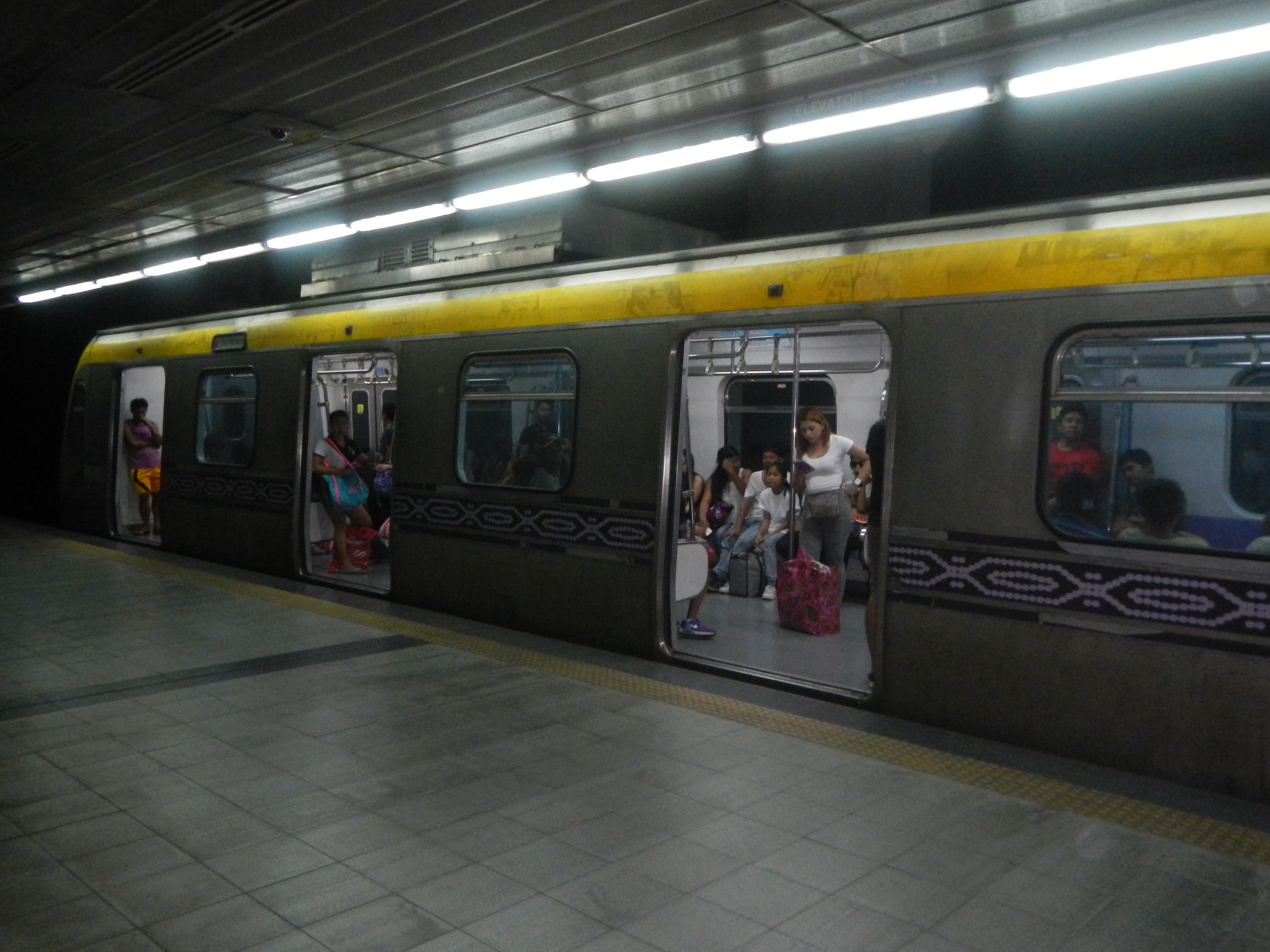
Train arriving at Katipunan station

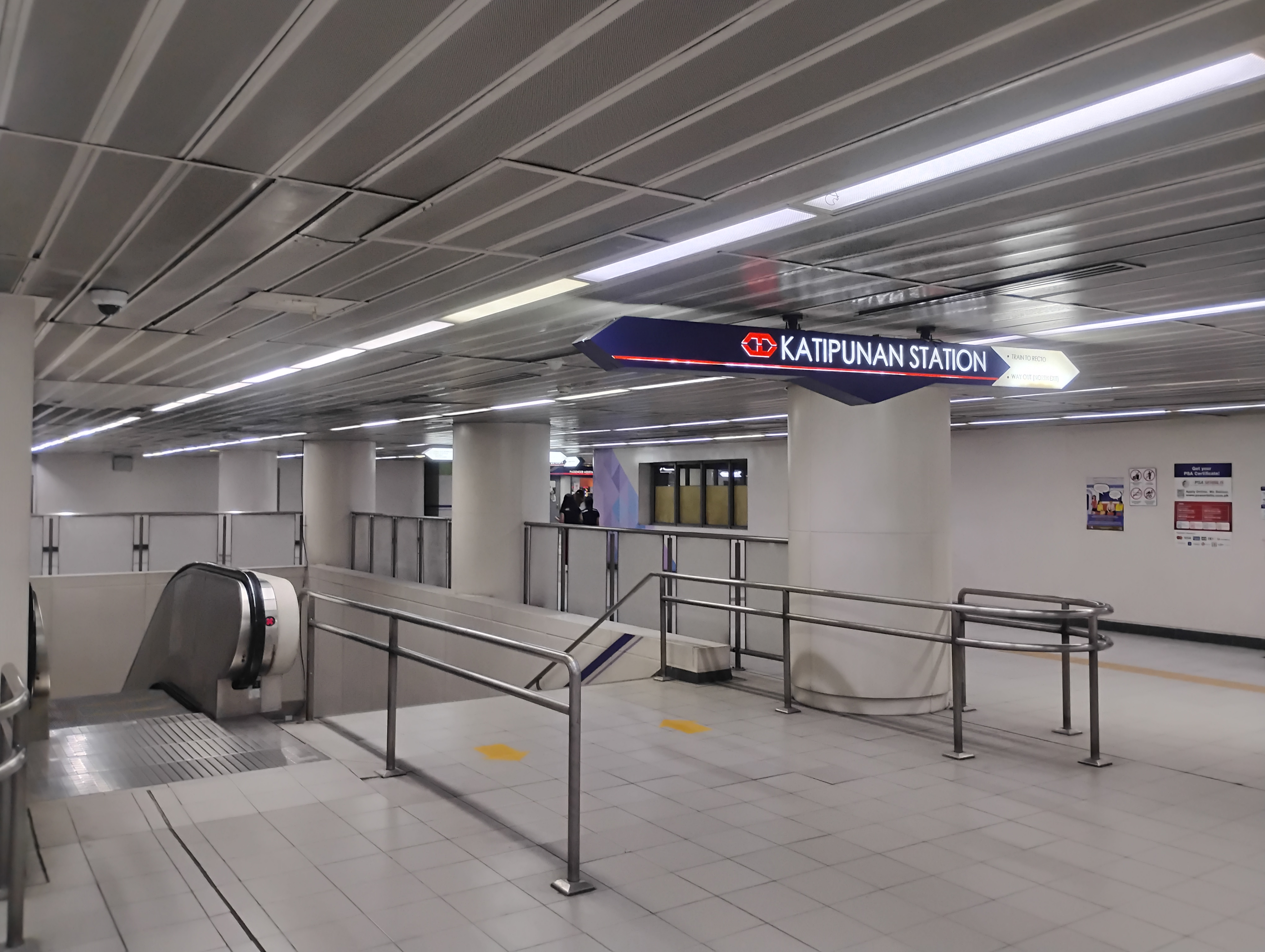
Concourse area

Station exterior in 2014
