= Vince Dantona =

American ventriloquist (1949–2012)

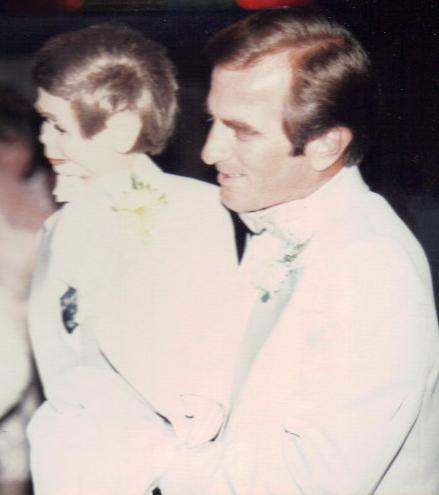
- Vince Dantona performing at a wedding in 1989
- Born: April 2, 1949
- Died: February 27, 2012 (aged 62)

Comedy career
- Medium: Stand-up comedy
- Genre: Ventriloquist
- Website: vinceandgeorge.com

Vince Dantona (April 2, 1949 – February 27, 2012) was an American ventriloquist.

Vince Dantona was born in Brooklyn New York. To Parents Vincent Dantona and Dolores Dantona, Siblings to Linda Dantona, Maureen Dantona, Joseph Dantona, Debra Dantona, Richard J Dantona, and Laura Dantona.

== Career ==
Dantona began his comedy career in Okinawa during his time in the Marine Corps, learning ventriloquism through a correspondence course by practicing in front of a mirror. Before long, Vince purchased a wooden dummy and dubbed him "George."

Vince began working on Long Island with other performers, including Eddie Murphy, Rob Bartlett, and Bob Nelson at Richard Dixon's White House Inn in North Massapequa, New York. At first, Vince had wanted to do stand-up, but found he did better with a ventriloquist act; Vince has called George his "safety net", saying, "He gets away with everything. Nobody ever gets mad at him."

Before finishing the course, he (along with George) hosted a two-hour children's program on Armed Forces television and radio. Vince was also the first $10,000 winner on ABC-TV's America's Funniest People in 1991.

Vince toured with the USO, entertaining United States troops. Vince and George appeared on numerous television shows, including Comedy Central, Good Morning America, The Joan Rivers Show, The Joe Franklin Show, and Comedy Tonight. On occasion they opened for Soupy Sales, Henny Youngman, Robert Klein, Tiny Tim, Jay and the Americans, Martina McBride, Judy Collins, Bobby Rydell, Bobby Vinton, Little Anthony and the Imperials, and Boyz II Men.

Vince regularly performed at such places as Pocono Palace in the Pocono mountains, Caesar's Resorts, and The Tropicana in Atlantic City.

Dantona died on February 27, 2012, at the age of 62.
