= Cubao, Quezon City =

Area and informal district of Quezon City, Metro Manila, Philippines

Cubao Araneta City
- Informal district of Quezon City
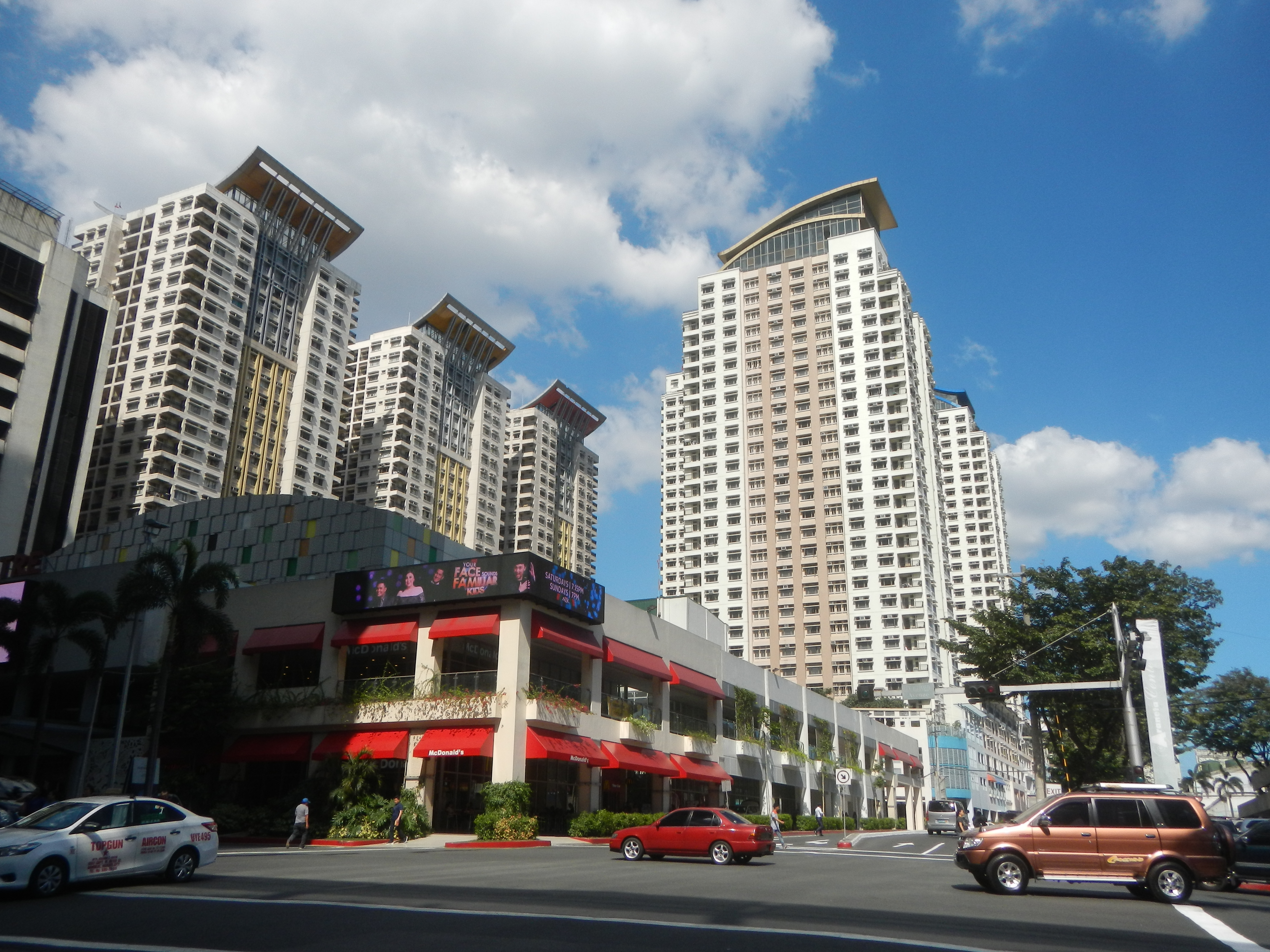
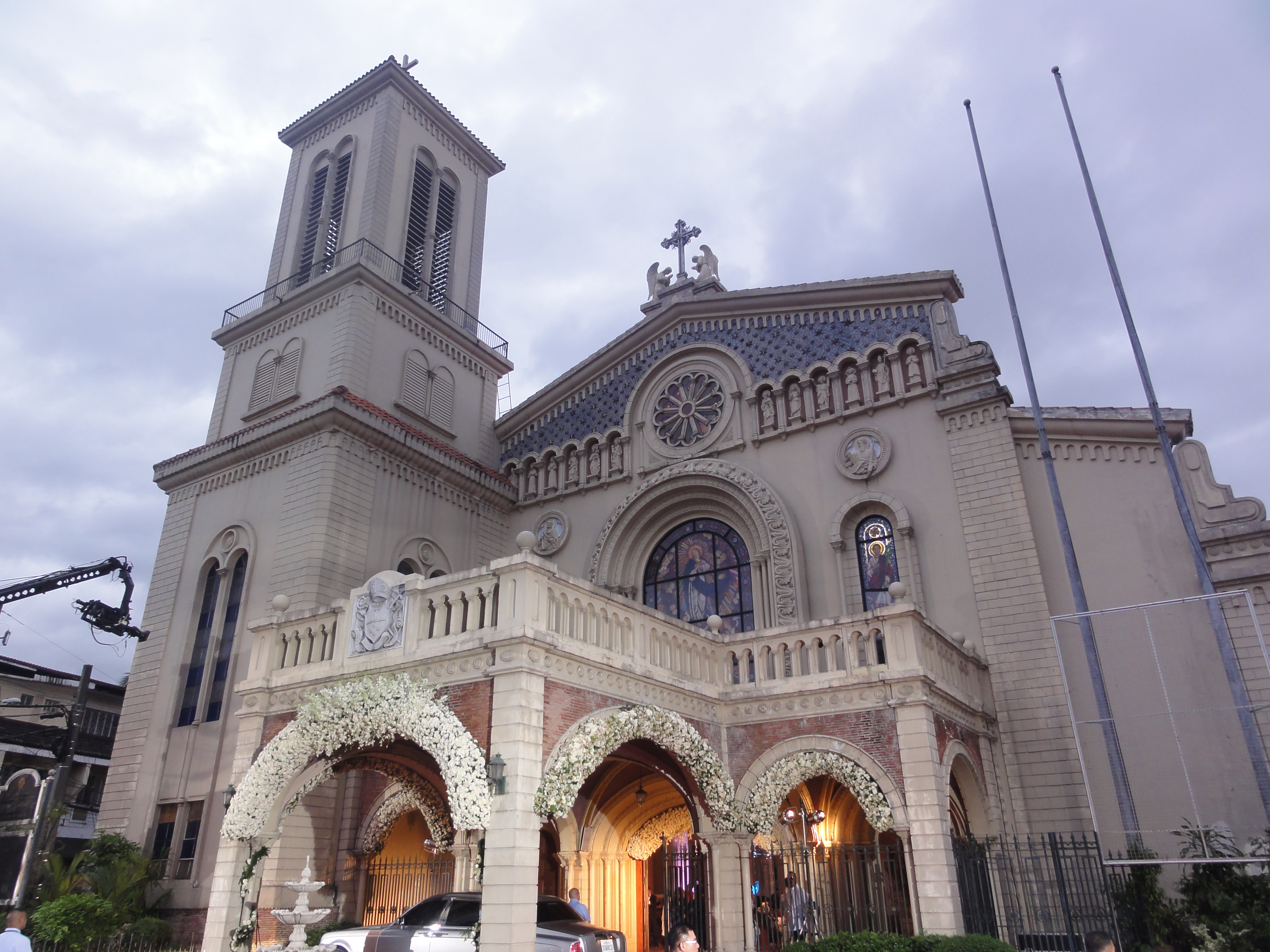
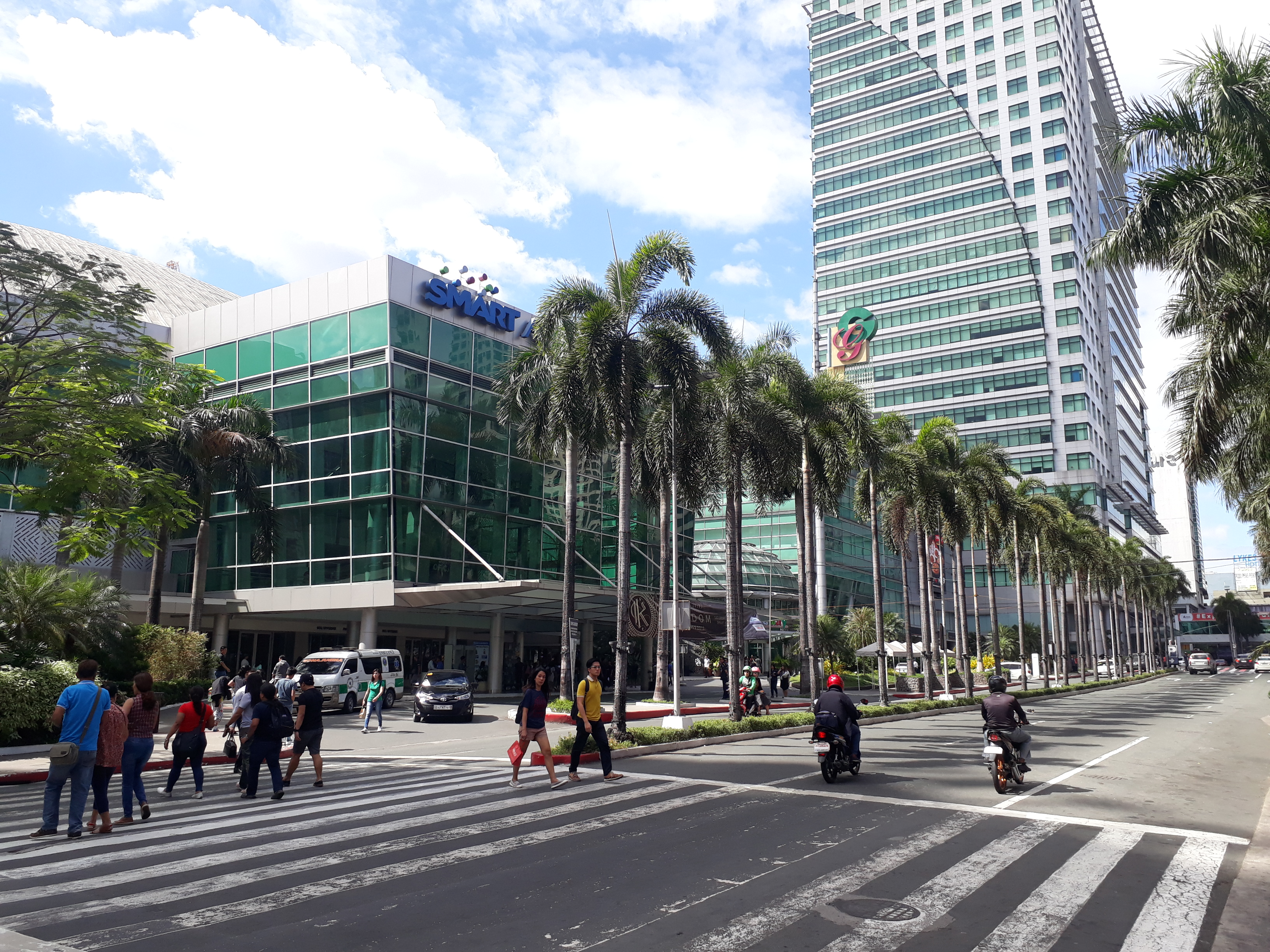
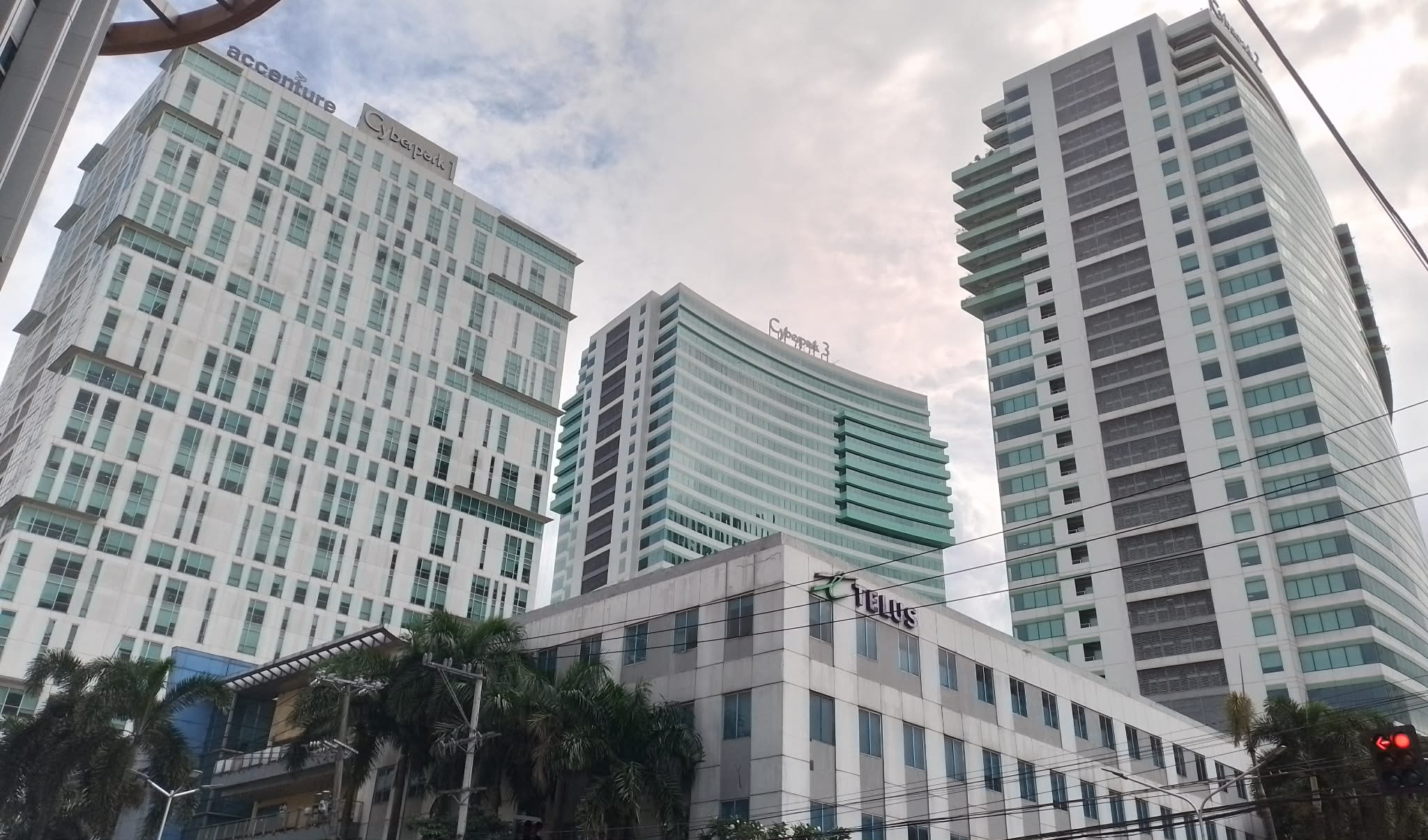
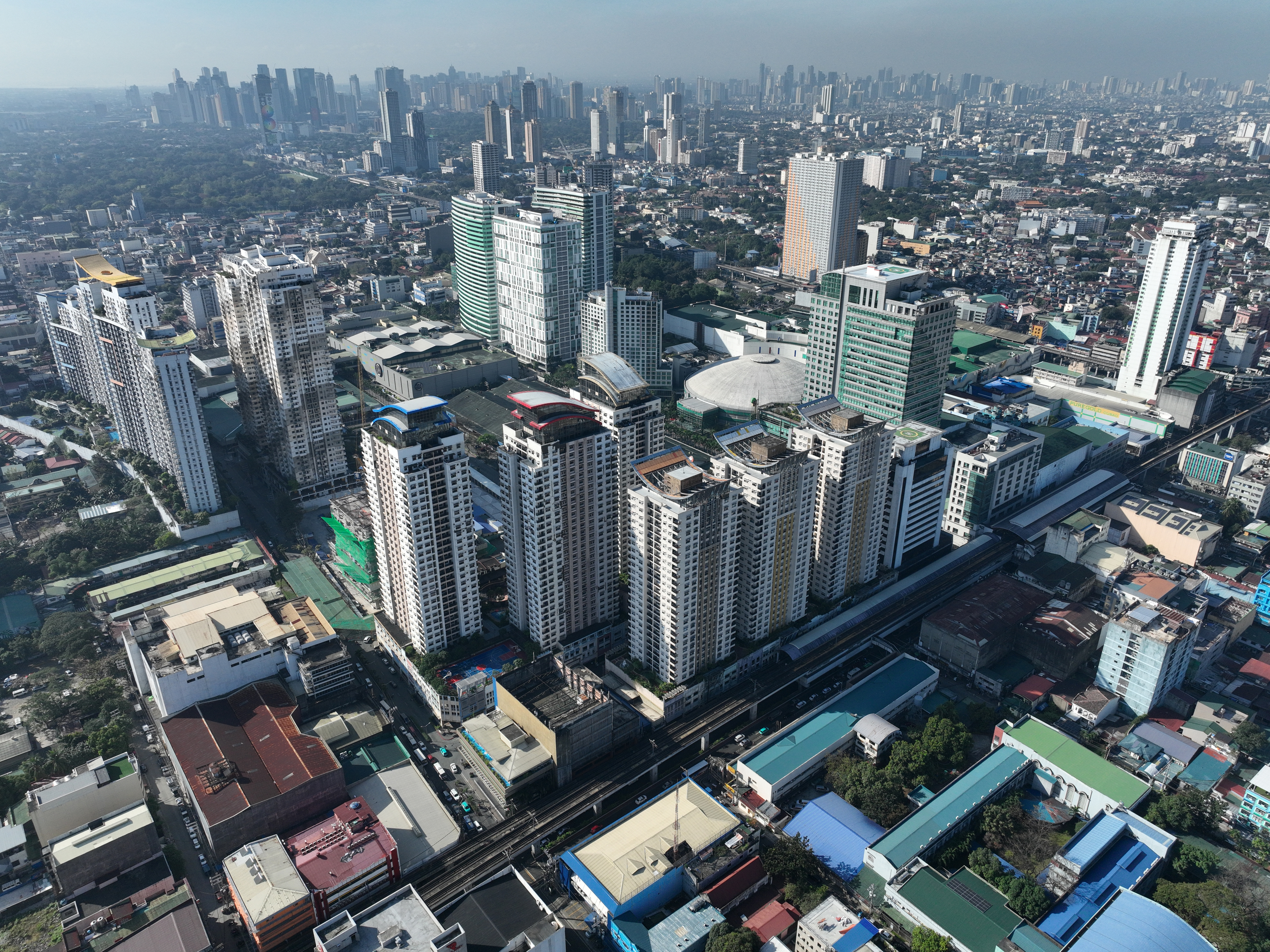
- From Top to Bottom: 1. Manhattan Gardens, Araneta City; 2. Immaculate Conception Church, Cubao; 3. Smart Araneta Coliseum and Gateway Mall, Cubao; 4. Araneta City Cyberpark; 5. Drone shot of Araneta City in 2026
- Interactive map of Cubao
- Coordinates: 14.61667°N 121.05°E
- Country: Philippines
- Region: National Capital Region
- City: Quezon City
- Congressional districts: Part of the: 3rd, and 4th districts of Quezon City
- Time zone: UTC+08:00 (Philippine Standard Time)
- Zip codes: 1109

Cubao is an informal district of Quezon City, Philippines. The district serves as one of the transportation hubs of Metro Manila.

Araneta City is primarily known as the center for shopping, business and transportation for wider Metro Manila. There are 5 Shopping Mall Complexes and 1 digital business park in the area. Cubao also serves as a key interchange transport terminal for MRT-3 and LRT-2. Cubao also has a national-wide terminal for bus travel to other provinces such as Luzon, Baguio, Tagaytay, Visayas, and Mindanao.

Araneta City has a combined retail space of roughly 438,900 square meters (4,724,000 square feet) across its key malls and markets, within a total complex floor area exceeding 1,100,000 square meters. Araneta City hosts over 2,100 shopping, dining and leisure establishments throughout the complex.

Newer developments are also set to rise and begin construction within the next few years as part of the second phase of the redevelopment master plan. The redevelopment plan for the complex is set to be completed within 2030.

== Etymology ==
The name Cubao is derived as Spanish rendering of the word kubaw, a local species of banana. Also, there is also another story like that Cubao is derived from calling a hunchback (Kuba o!).

== History ==
As part of Quezon City creation in 1939 to be the new capital city replacing Manila, Cubao was one of the annexed areas from San Juan which also includes Diliman, Kamuning, New Manila, and San Francisco del Monte.

After the war, in early 1950s, José Amado Araneta from Negros purchased 35 hectares of land between Calle Quezón (now Aurora Boulevard) and Highway 54 (now EDSA) from Radio Corporation of America (RCA). He started the development of newly acquired land into residential and commercial hub, which attracts many people to move or to settle in Cubao, as Escolta was still slowly recovering from Battle of Manila bombings. Many restaurants such as A&W, Kup n Saucer, Ming's and Hong Ning's, Ma Mon Luk, and Aling Nena's Bibingka arose in the district, with the closure of many of them after 2000s.

With the construction of Araneta Coliseum, Cubao became a recreational sports venue, hosting the World Junior Lightweight Championship bout between Harold Gomes and Gabriel “Flash” Elorde. In 1975, Thrilla in Manila happened between Muhammad Ali vs. Joe Frazier. Also PBA games hosted for many years.

== List of barangays ==
The following barangays are either covered of then "district" or only known alternatively as Cubao:

Barangay Name	Legislative District	Alternate Name
E. Rodriguez	District 3	Project 5, Cubao
Mangga	District 3	Anonas, Cubao
San Roque	District 3	Cubao
Silangan	District 3	Cubao
Socorro	District 3	Cubao, Araneta City
Immaculate Concepcion	District 4	Cubao
Kaunlaran	District 4	Cubao
Pinagkaisahan	District 4	Cubao
San Martin de Porres	District 4	Cubao, Arayat

== Economy ==
Ali Mall

=== Shopping mall ===
As Araneta City being situated at Cubao, many shopping malls are established such as Ali Mall, Gateway Mall, Farmers Plaza, and SM Araneta City (formerly SM Cubao). Wet market Farmers Market's location is adjacent to Farmers Plaza. Indoor amusement park Fiesta Carnival is located along General Aguinaldo and General McArthur Avenues. Some old movie theaters are repurposed and now rented by some local companies such as Puregold, Rex Bookstore, Savemore Market, the AIA Philippines, and others.

Also, Cubao Expo (or Cubao X) is also known for young artists' haven, galleries, bars, cafes and even curio shop which was established in 2000. Before it became Cubao Expo, it is known as Marikina Shoe Expo. Also, Ali Mal features Sining Kamalig, also young artists' expo which was originally established in 1972 but transferred in Cubao in 2000. Also, Fiesta Carnival was launched in 1970s, with its closure in 1990s, which returned by 2023.

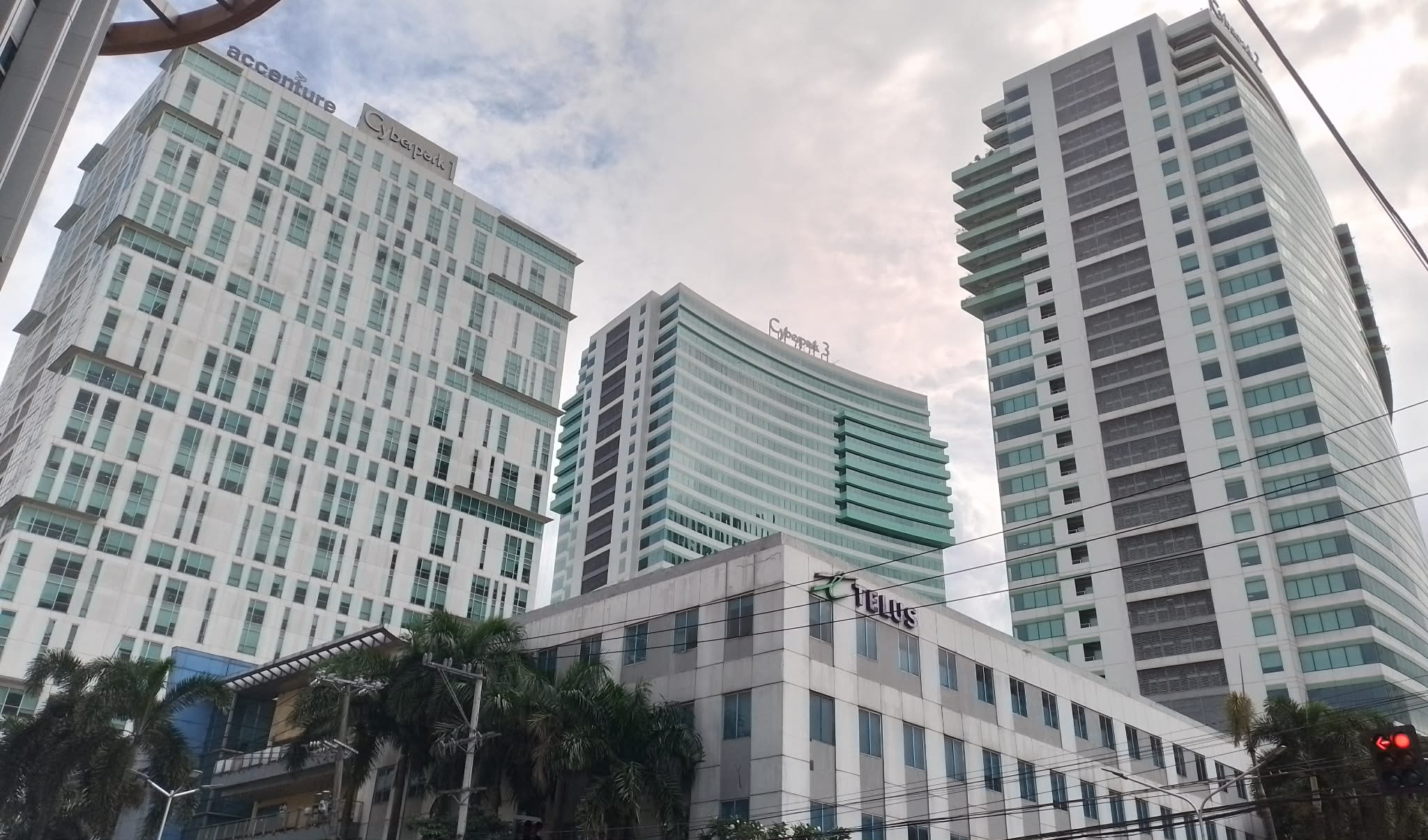
Araneta City Cyberpark

=== Office towers and tech hubs ===
Many office towers erected in Cubao, one of those is 22-storey Aurora Tower which is a mixed-use tower comprising retail, office, penthouse spaces and a rooftop helipad. The first seven floors of Aurora Tower are occupied by Isetann Department Store and Supermarket, and other floors by the Honorary Consulate of Colombia. Gateway Office is located Aurora Boulevard and General Aguinaldo Avenue, which connects Gateway Mall 1 on ground level and the LRT 2 Gateway Mall Concourse on second floor.

The 31-storey mixed-use tower Gateway Tower serves as the headquarters of the Araneta Group and other Business Process Outsourcing (BPO) companies. It was directly connected to the Gateway Mall. Also, a cyberpark is located which serves as hub for both international and local companies, primarily Business Process Outsourcing (BPO) companies which has five towers.

=== Recreation ===
Araneta Coliseum, one of the biggest indoor arenas in the Philippines is located at Araneta City. In the same business district, New Frontier Theater is also located and being used for concerts.

=== Residential ===
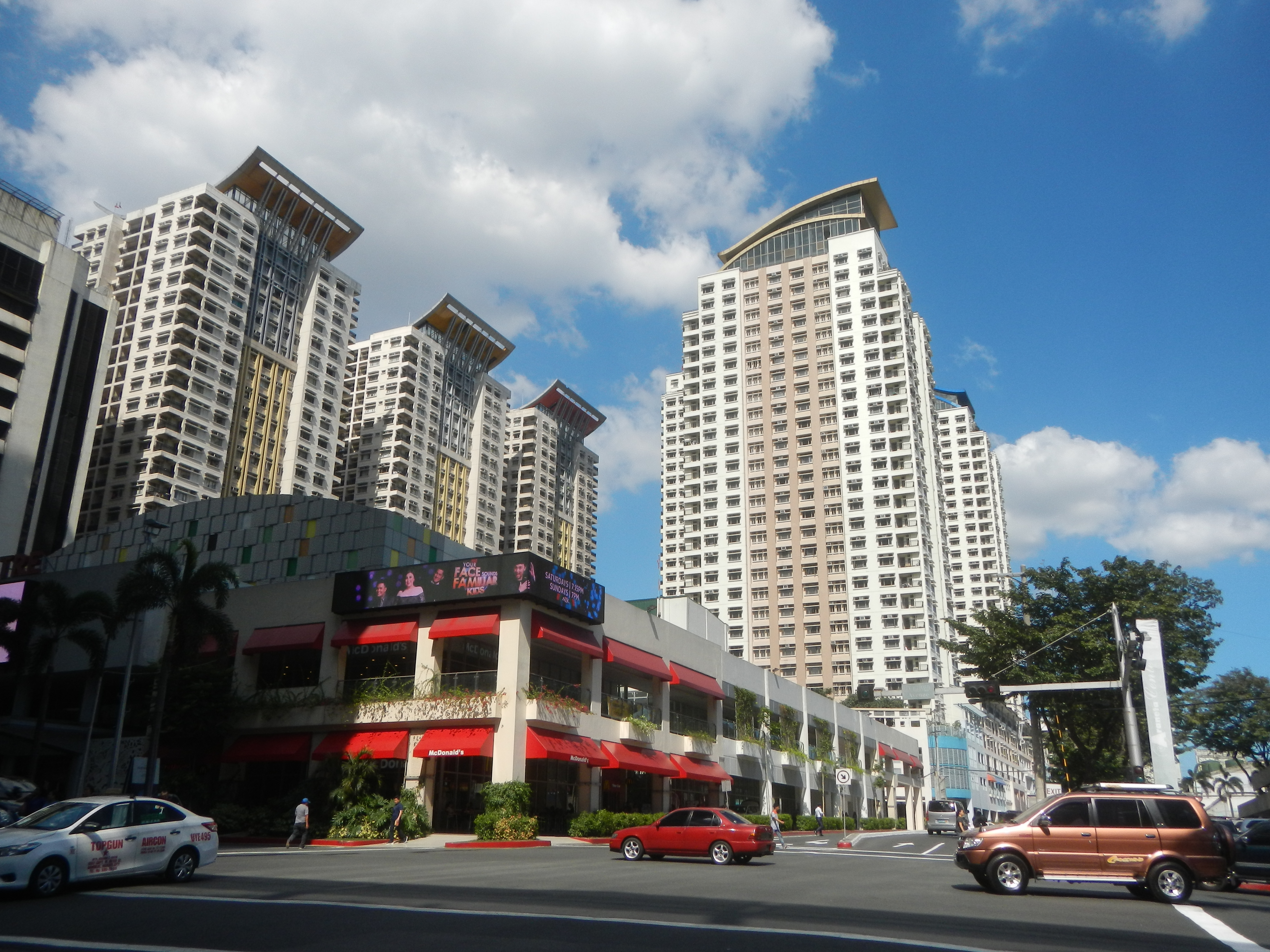
The New Frontier Theater, along with the Manhattan Parkway and the Manhattan Parkview.

Many condominium complex are located at Cubao, such as Manhattan Gardens, the first transit-oriented residential development in the country. Another residential area within Cubao is the Euro Towers International Inc. owned Vivaldi Residences Cubao, a 40-storey mixed-use tower, located along the corners of EDSA and Aurora Boulevard. Also, Ibis Styles Araneta City is known for being a budget hotel near Gateway Mall 2.

== Recent and future developments ==
=== Gateway Square ===
The Gateway Square is a 5-hectare (12-acre) mixed-use superblock development located in the central part of the Araneta City. Gateway Square occupies the buildings around the Smart Araneta Coliseum and the Gateway Malls 1 and 2 and consists of the eight properties, namely the Gateway Mall 1, the Gateway Mall 2, the Gateway Tower, the Gateway Office, the Smart Araneta Coliseum, the Novotel Manila Araneta City, the Ibis Styles Araneta City and the Parking Garage South.

The mixed-use complex has a total floor area of 400,000 m^{2} (4,300,000 sq ft) and is the first of its kind in the country as the complex offers a combination of malls, offices, hotels, a sports arena and over 3,100 parking spaces all within a single area. Direct connections to other buildings and developments within the Araneta City are allows seamless transfers through sky bridges, direct access paths, and pedestrian walk paths. The complex also has direct connections to various transport systems, as the Gateway Square hosts two railway stations and other feeder transport systems. The development first began construction in October 2002 with the groundbreaking of the Gateway Mall 1 and the entire complex was completed on 2024, with the completion of the Gateway Mall 2 and the Ibis Styles Hotel.

=== City Plaza ===
Set to be built within the Shopwise Supermarket, which is currently revived as Fiesta Carnival, the City Plaza is a 2 hectares (4.9 acres) mixed-use development consisting of five towers with approximately 60 storeys skyward or higher for each tower. The City Plaza will also feature a four-star hotel, two premium grade office towers, two luxury residential towers, leisure and retail spaces, and green amenities such as an outdoor concourse, an amphitheater; the "Spanish Steps", which were inspired from the Spanish Steps in Rome, Italy, and the civic center, located in the middle of the complex. The upcoming complex will also be influenced from the Rockefeller Center in New York City and is presently in the under development stages.

== Education ==
Several educational institutions which are part of Cubao are Stella Maris College Quezon City, Technological Institute of the Philippines (TIP) Quezon City Campus established in 1983, the Samson College of Science and Technology (only moved to Cubao in 1983), the Jesus Christ Saves Global Outreach Christian Academy (1996), the Starland International School (Cubao campus in 2006), the Pail and Shovel Integrated School, PHINMA-Republican College, and the STI Academic Center.

Known public schools in the area are Ponciano Bernardo Elementary School (near P. Tuazon Boulevard), Emilio Aguinaldo Elementary School, E. Rodriguez Sr. Elementary School, Carlos Garcia High School, Cubao Elementary School, Camp General Emilio Aguinaldo High School, Fort Aguinaldo Elementary School, Ponciano Bernardo High School, Ramon Magsaysay (Cubao) High School, Juan Sumulong High School, 15th Avenue Elementary School, E. Rodriguez Sr. Elementary School (est. 1968), and Carlos Garcia High School.

== Transportation ==
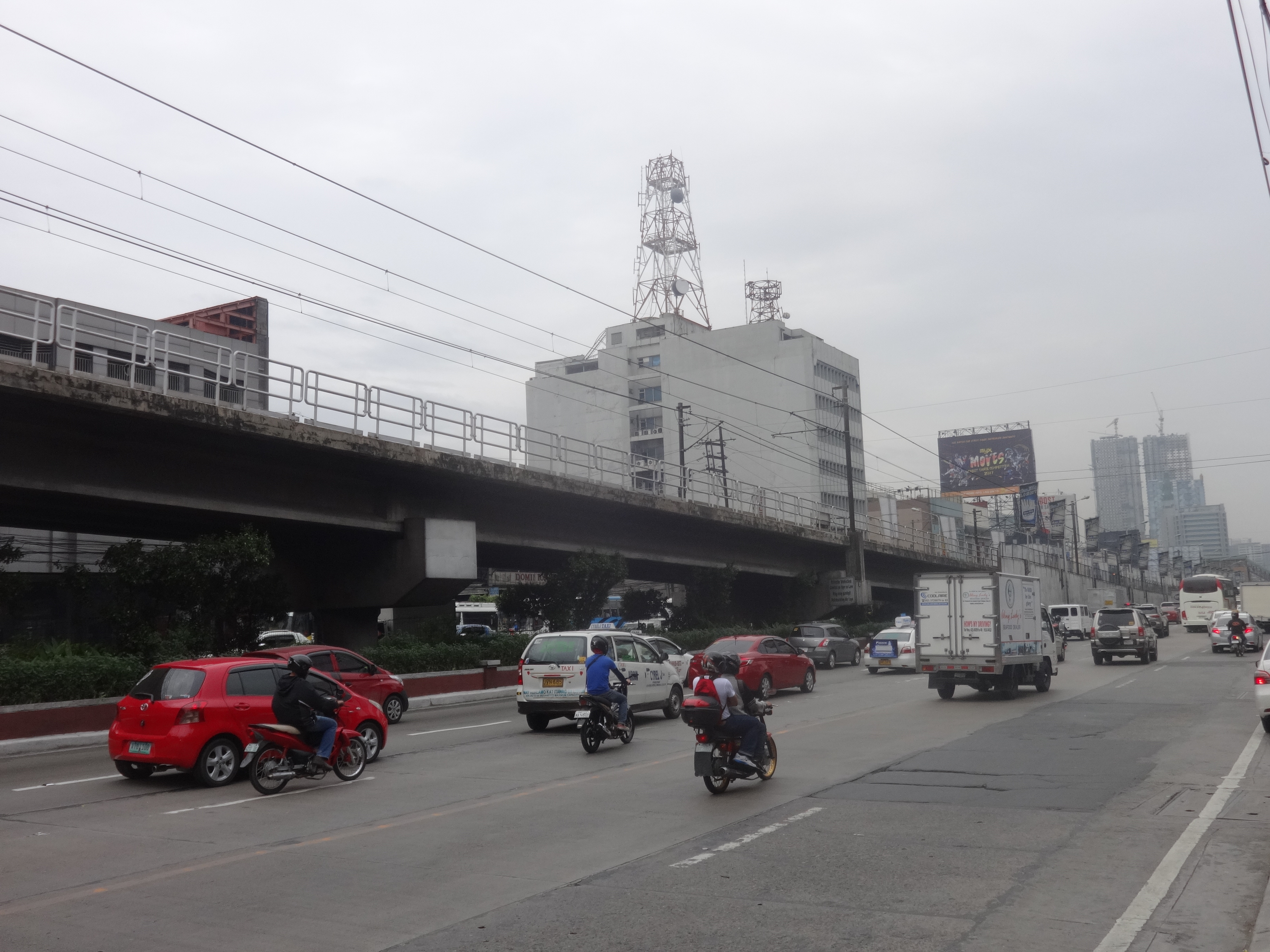
EDSA-Cubao near NY Avenue

Cubao is the hub of major national bus transportation carriers. Among the bus companies in Cubao with their terminal are: Baliwag Transit, Five Star, Superlines, Victory Liner, HM Transport, Apls, Viron Transit, Cisco, Dagupan Bus, DLTBCo, GV Florida, Pangasinan Solid North Transit, and other southern Luzon buses. Also a busport is located inside Araneta City.

Cubao is served by two train stations: the Metro Rail Transit Line 3 (MRT-3) follows EDSA with a station named Anonas (located between Barangays Project 3 and 4), and Araneta Center–Cubao, while the Light Rail Transit Line 2 (LRT-2) follows Aurora Avenue and has a station with the same name of their MRT counterpart.

== Prominent places ==
=== Retail ===
- Gateway Mall 1 - 100,000 Sqm of Retail Space.
- Gateway Mall 2 - Opened on 1 September 2023. Has about 200,000 Sqm of Retail space, making the Gateway Mall Complex one of the largest in the Philippines at 300,000 Sqm of Total Retail space.
- SM Araneta City. Has 102,000 Sqm of Retail Space. SM Araneta City has the largest department store building of SM Store in the country
- Ali Mall
- Farmer's Plaza
- Isetann Cubao
- Cubao Expo - widely considered as Metro Manila's Creative Center hub. Cubao Expo is a vibrant area known for its eclectic mix of shops, restaurants, and art spaces. It hosts a variety of local vendors and unique boutiques, showcasing Filipino culture and creativity.

=== Groceries ===
- Farmer's Market - Wet Market
- Shopwise Cubao
- SM Hypermarket Cubao - SM Araneta City
- Robinsons Supermarket Gateway Mall
- Robinsons Easymart Manhattan Heights

=== Entertainment ===
- Smart Araneta Coliseum - 20,000 seater indoor stadium, one of Asia's largest. Primary uses includes International Concerts, Sports, Pageant and Religious events. Famously hosted the "Thrilla in Manila" boxing match between Muhammad Ali and Joe Frazier.
- New Frontier Theater - 2300+ seater theater catering to a variety of events, ranging from performing and visual arts, local and international concerts, and fan meet-up gatherings
- Art in Island - The first and largest Mixed Media Art Museum in The Philippines. Art in Island is an interactive 3D art museum that turns visitors into part of the artwork.
- Fiesta Carnival 2.0 - Classic theme park with 1970s nostalgic theme and theme rides. Currently undergoing renovation works as of August 2026.

=== Business centers ===
- Araneta City Cyberpark. One of Manila's largest business park with over 500,000 sqm of office space. Primarily focused on the digital economy and has over 20,000 office workers as of 2018.
- Regalia Park Towers
- Aurora Tower Cubao. The 22-storey Aurora Tower is a mixed-use tower comprising retail, office, penthouse spaces and a rooftop helipad
- Gateway Tower. The 31-storey mixed-use tower Gateway Tower serves as the headquarters of the Araneta Group and other Business Process Outsourcing (BPO) companies.

=== Housing developments ===
- Manhattan Gardens - Retail and Residential Integrated Development. Directly connected to LRT-2 and MRT-3 via a fully-sheltered private skybridge.

=== Hotels ===
- Novotel Manila (4*)
- ibis Styles Manila (4*). Recently opened in 2025 and features over 280 guest suites. Directly connected to Gateway Mall 2. Hotel has different restaurants catering to different cuisines and a rooftop bar.

=== Transportation ===
- MRT-3 - Araneta-Cubao Station
- LRT-2 - Araneta Center-Cubao Station
- Araneta Center Bus Port - One of only two Bus Interchanges in Metro Manila that connects the city to many other provinces in the Philippines.
- Victory Liner Bus Terminal - Bus Terminal exclusively for Victory Liner, connects to all over The Philippines.

== Popular culture ==
Cubao is featured in the lyrics of the Filipino song Ale (Nasa Langit Na Ba Ako?). The song's version by The Bloomfields released in 2007 become trending in TikTok by February 2026 by an uploader who did a "Cubao Expo 'fit-check dance".

== Notable residents ==
- J. Amado Araneta
- Mar Roxas
- Korina Sanchez

== Gallery ==
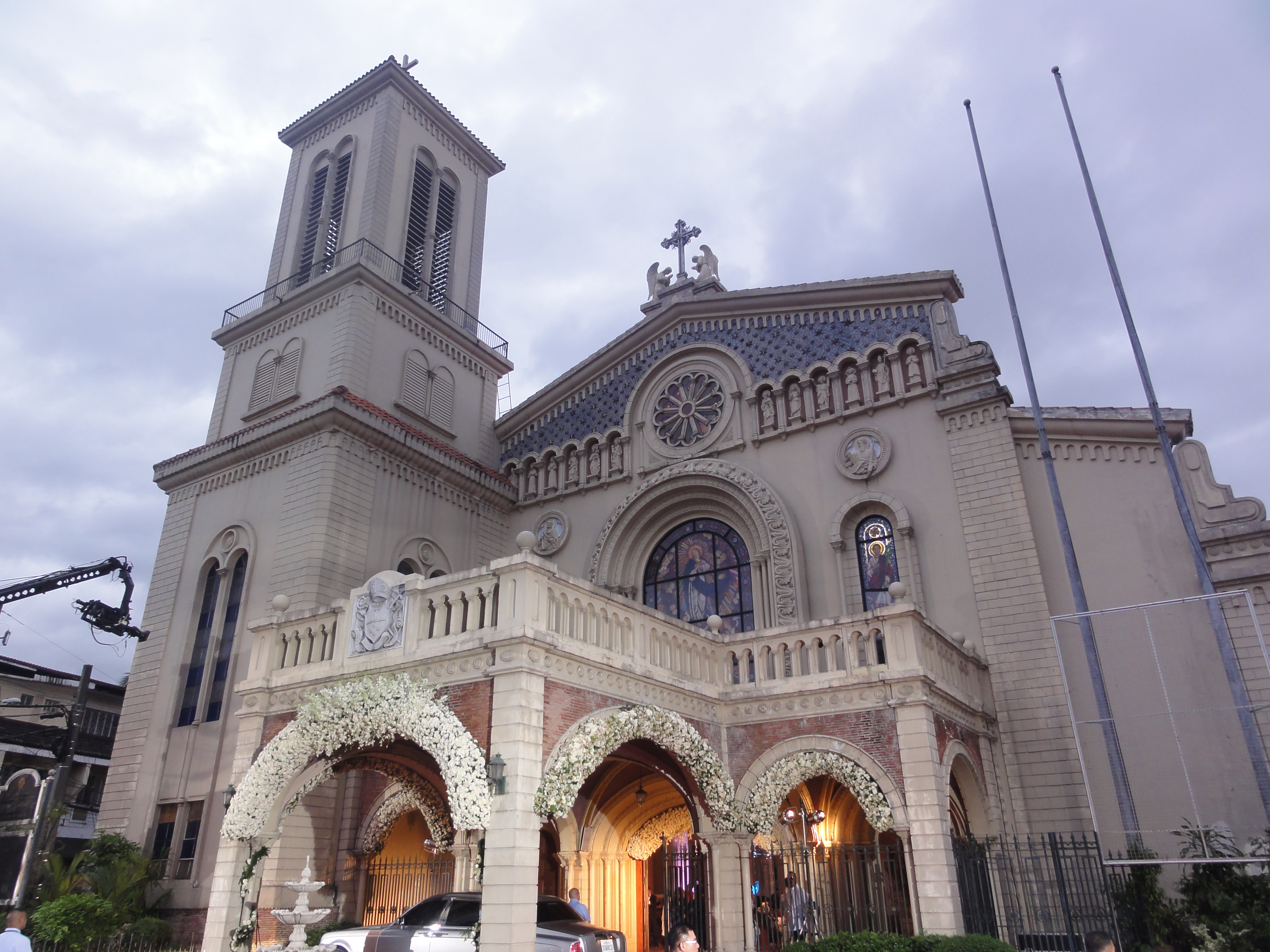
Immaculate Concepcion Church - Cubao

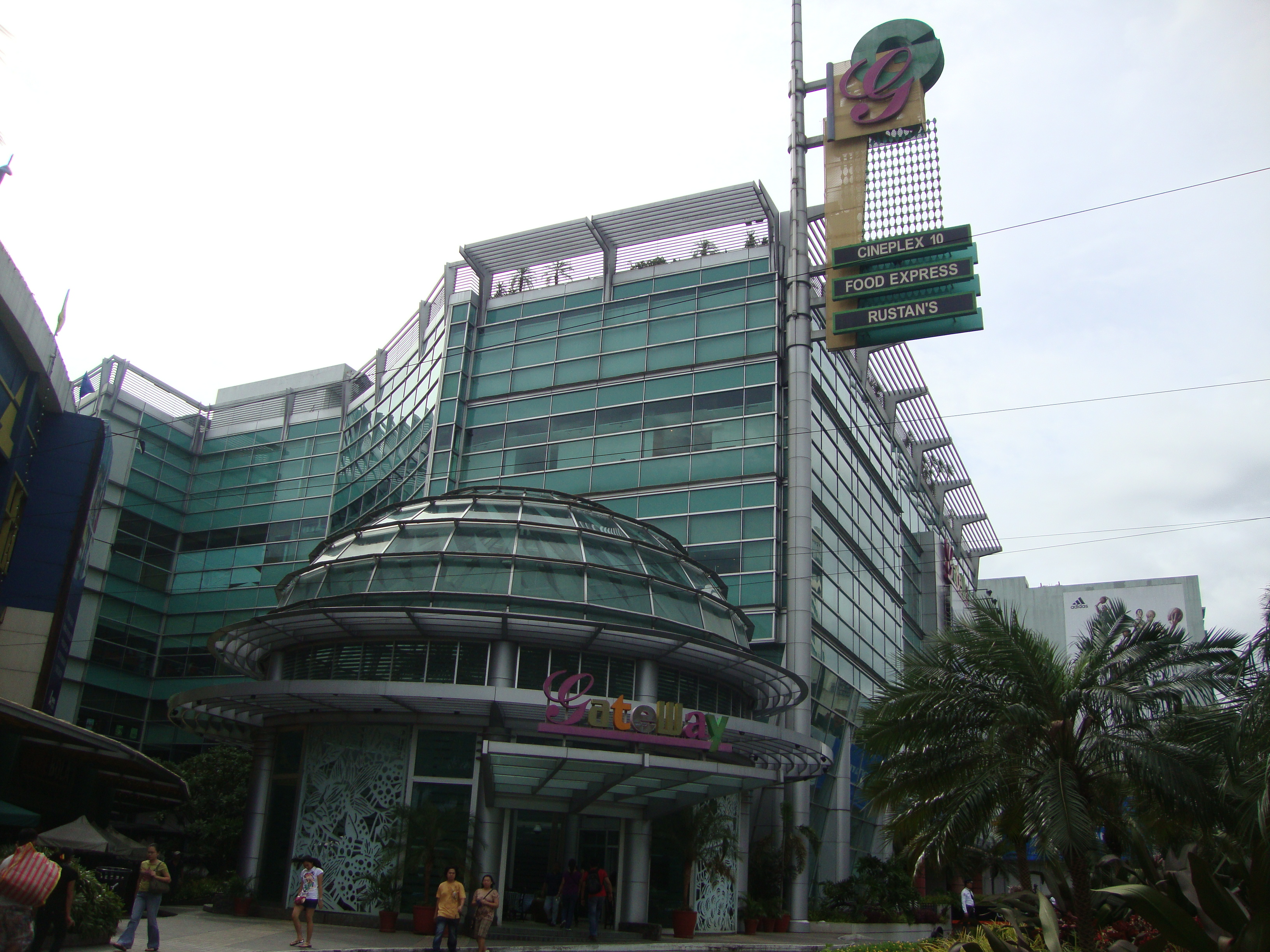
Gateway Mall

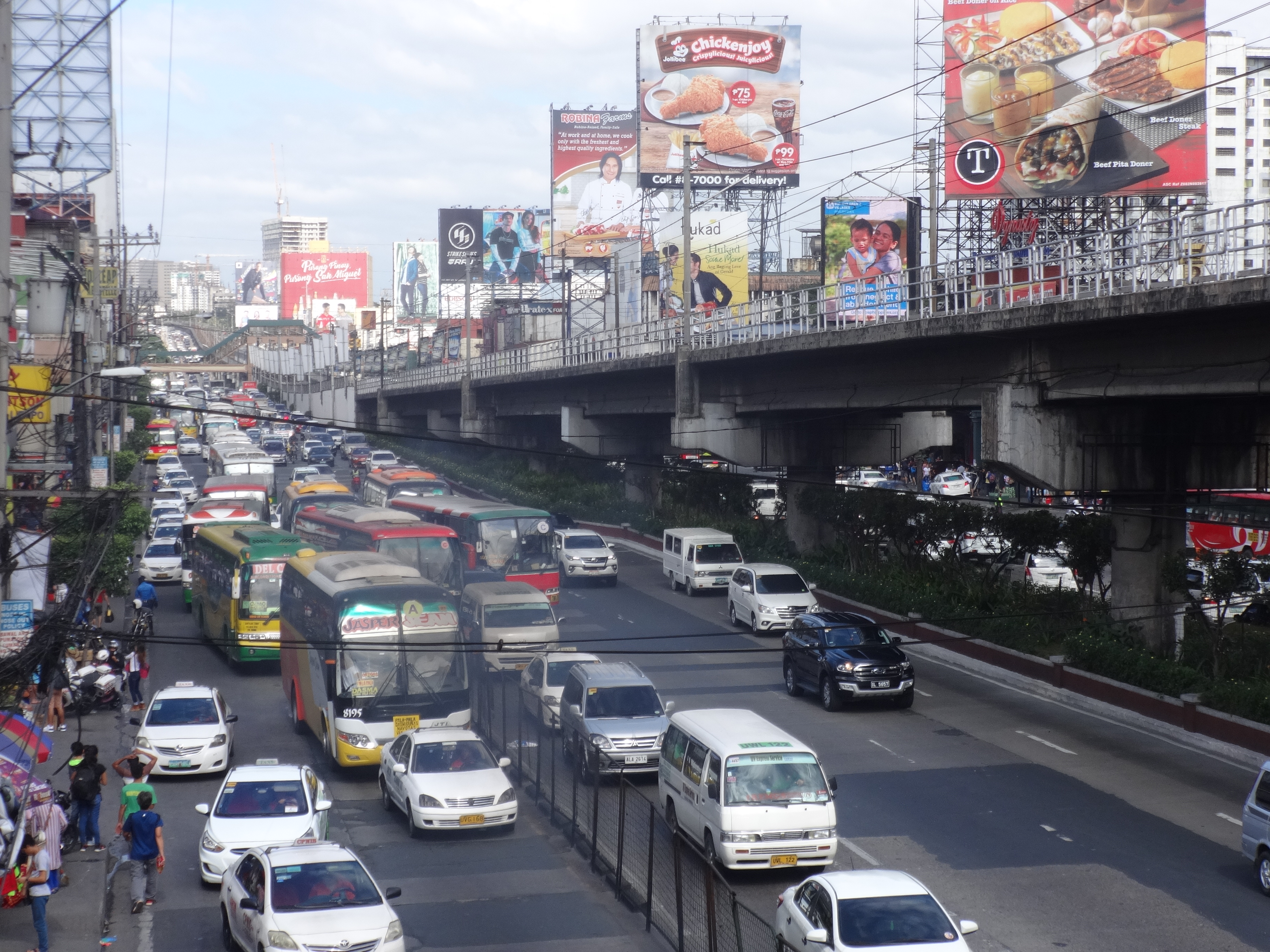
Cubao segment of EDSA

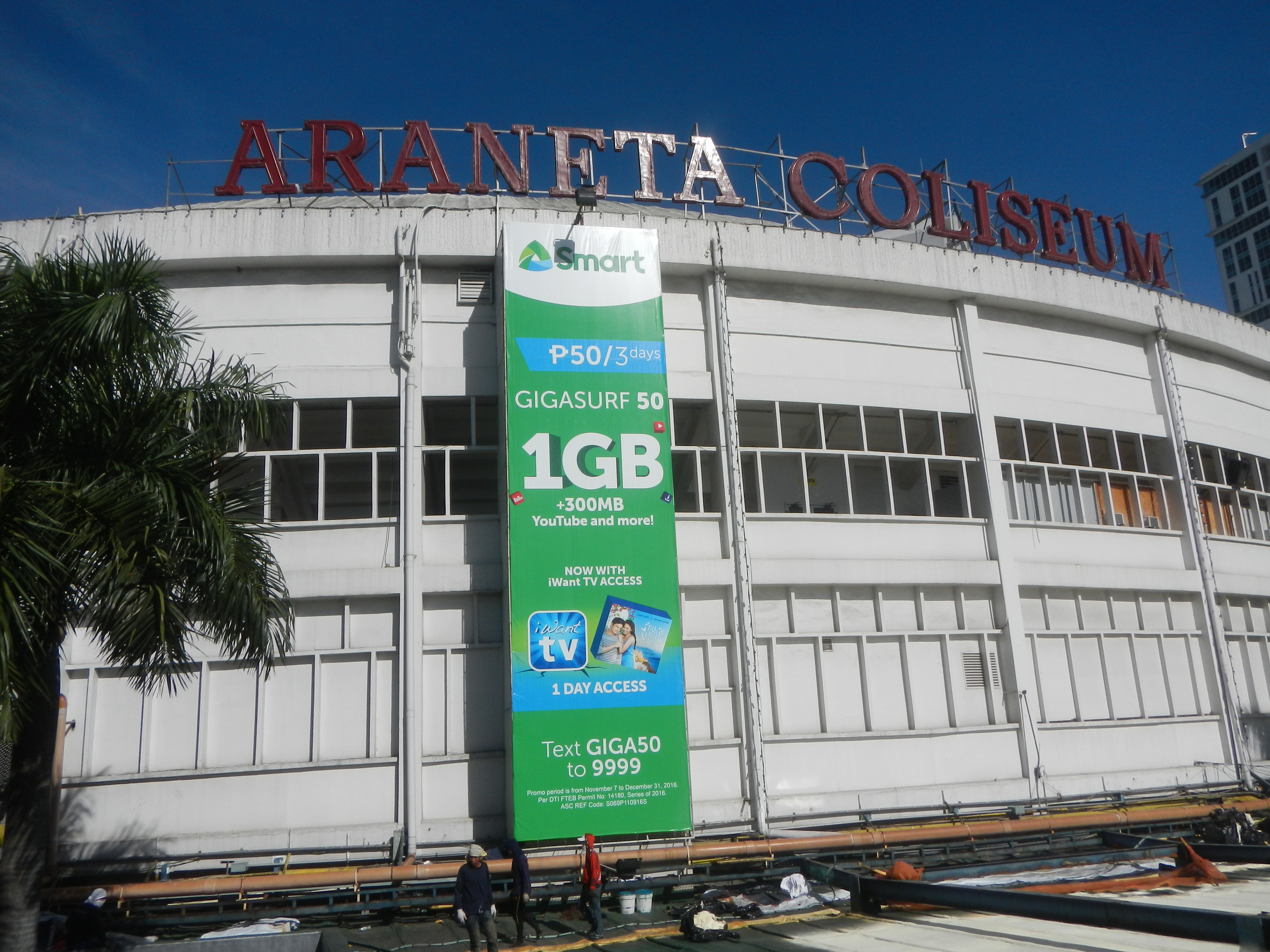
Araneta Coliseum

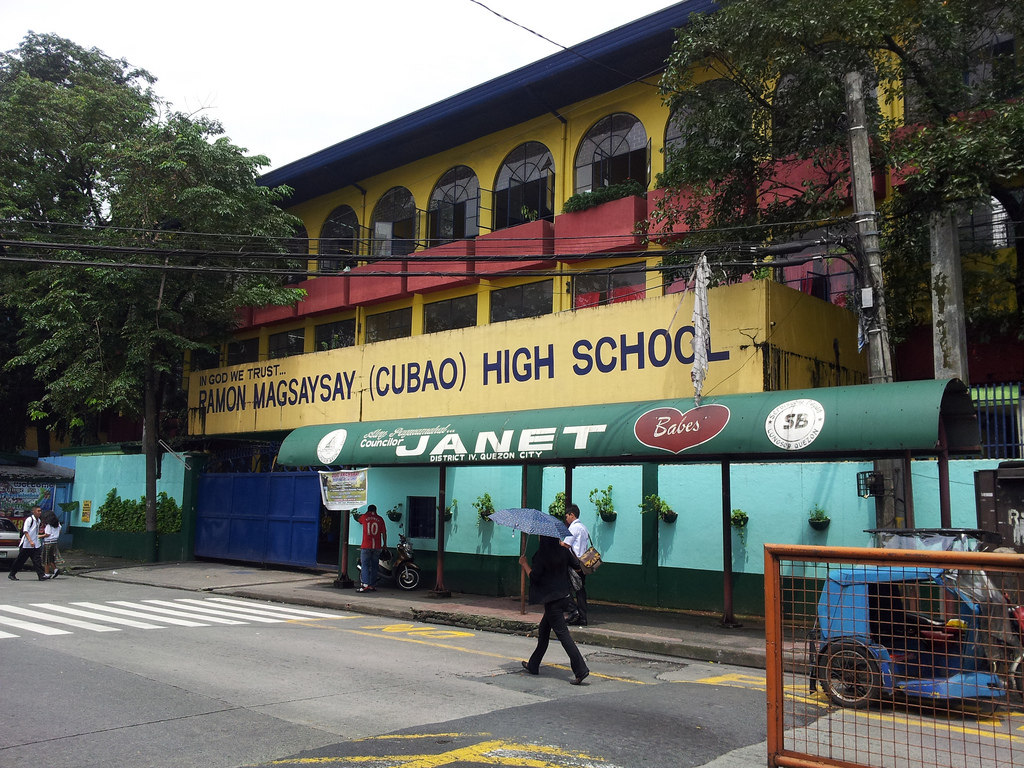
Ramon Magsaysay (Cubao) High School

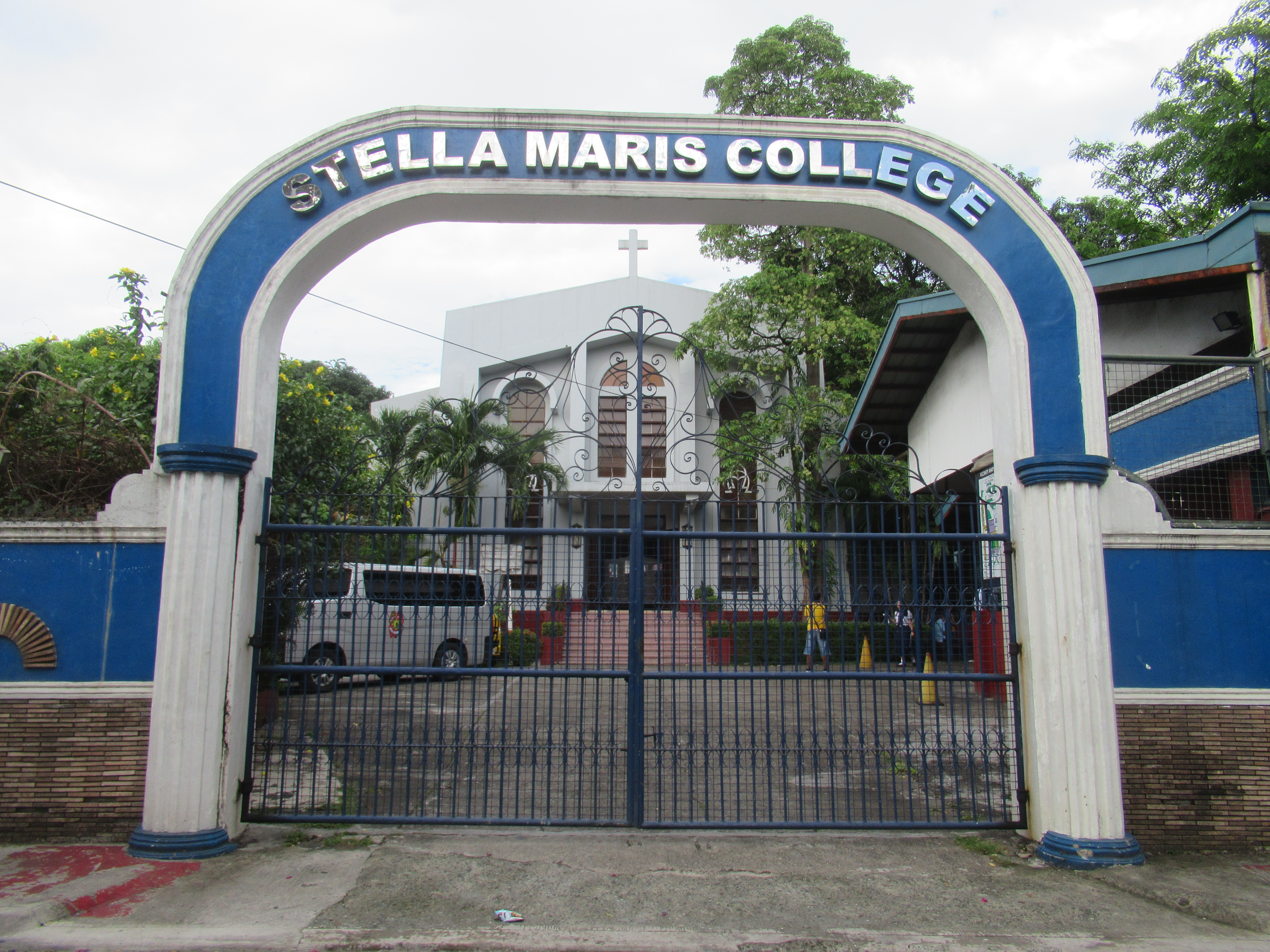
Stella Maris College at Cambridge Street
