= Bebot =

2005 song by the Black Eyed Peas

- Promotional cover for the music video release (Version 1)

Song by Black Eyed Peas

from the album Monkey Business
- Language: Tagalog
- Released: May 25, 2005
- Recorded: 2004–2005
- Genre: Pop-rap; Pinoy hip hop
- Length: 3:30
- Label: A&M; Interscope
- Songwriters: William Adams; Allan Pineda
- Producer: will.i.am

"Bebot" is a song by American hip hop group Black Eyed Peas from their fourth studio album Monkey Business (2005). The song is performed entirely in Tagalog by group member apl.de.ap, and the word bebot is Filipino slang for a "pretty woman". The song was never released as an official commercial single, but it later became one of the group's best-known songs in the Tagalog language, following "The Apl Song" from the group's third album Elephunk (2003).

== Composition and lyrics ==
"Bebot" was written by William Adams (will.i.am) and Allan Pineda (apl.de.ap), with production by Adams. The song sees Pineda take center stage for a lyrical love letter to his Filipino roots. Performed entirely in Tagalog and focuses on everyday life, food, friendship, and community. The word bebot is Filipino slang for a "pretty woman", "babe" or "hot chick". The chorus repeatedly uses the word "Filipino", reflecting Pineda's open celebration of his cultural identity.

The lyrics were personal, and Pineda wanted to share his experience as a Filipino-American but was unsure how much it would connect with others, especially the Black Eyed Peas' teenage fans. With its choppy beat and chanting chorus, the song became a hit at weddings and birthday parties, and even teenagers who did not speak Tagalog made dance routines to it. While the beat was catchy, it was the lyrics that left a lasting impact.

Pineda who was born in Angeles City, Pampanga, has consistently referenced his Filipino background in his work. "Bebot" is one of the clearest examples of this within the group's catalog.

The song samples the guitar riff of "Ang Bayan Kong Sinilangan (Cotabato)" by the Filipino folk rock band Asin.

== Music videos ==
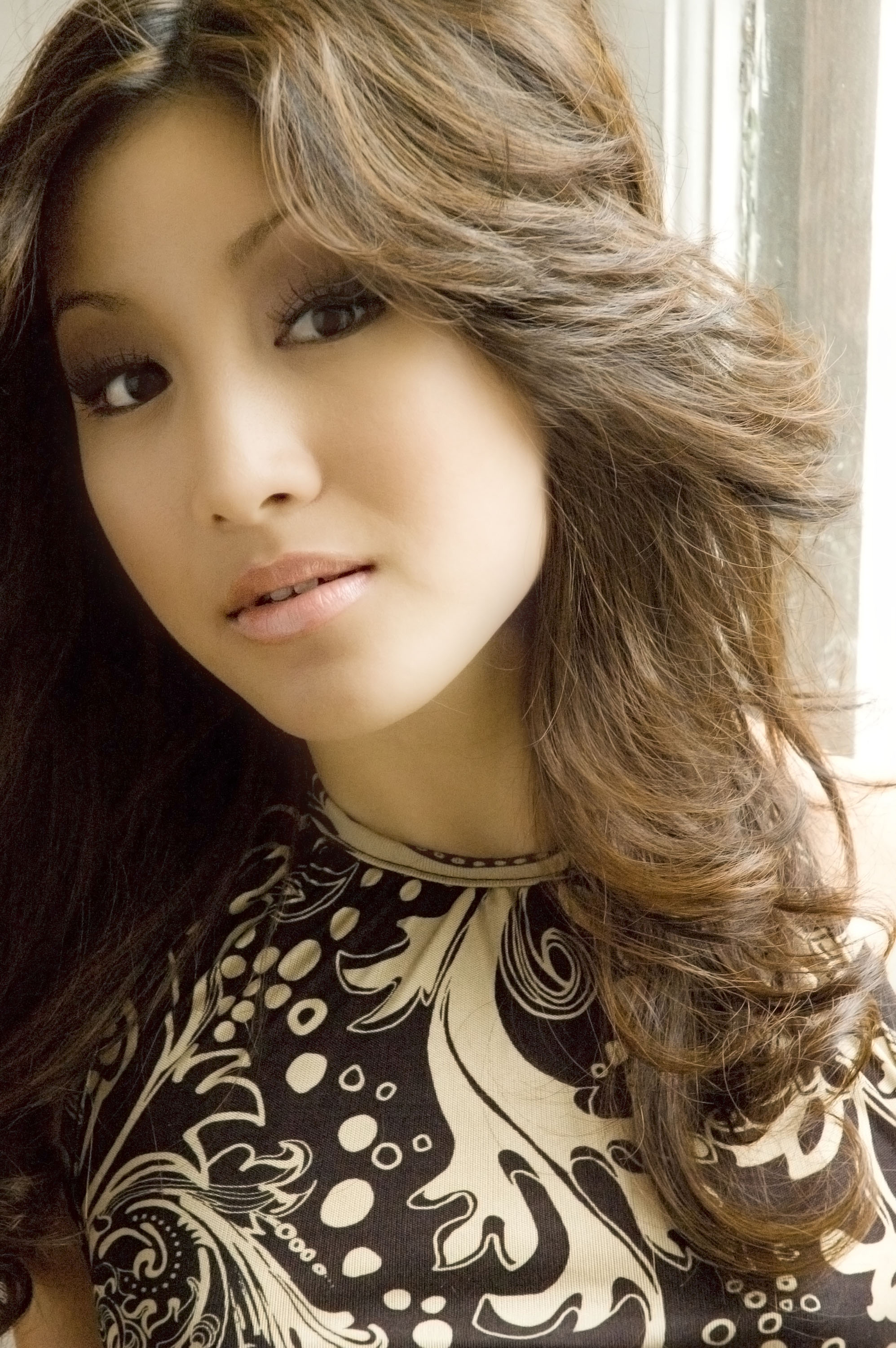
American singer Jasmine Trias appears in Version 2 of the music video as Pineda's sister.

Two music videos for the song, titled "Bebot: Generation One" and "Generation Two", were directed by Patricio Ginelsa, who had previously worked with the group for their 2003 song "The Apl Song". "Generation One" is set in 1930s Little Manila in Stockton, California, and portrays Filipino social life in taxi dance halls and community clubs. "Generation Two" is set in a contemporary Filipino-American community, featuring family gatherings and house parties. The video also includes Filipino-American performers, such as American Idol alum Jasmine Trias as Pineda's baby sister, and other cameos by Jose "Sway" Penala, Nump, Brian Viloria, Tiffany Limos, DJ Rhettmatic, Charmane Star, Tila Tequila, Camile Velasco, and Rafael Toledo of the Speaks. Both videos were independently funded and released primarily online.

Ginelsa revealed that the videos almost did not happen, as his original concept for a single video spanning 1936 to 2006 was rejected by the label. When the song gained popularity a year later, he returned and proposed making both videos for the price of one, but the label ultimately only approved Generation Two for public release.

Rafael Toledo, lead singer of the Washington, D.C.-based band the Speaks, said being invited to appear in the video was a major honor. He explained that the Black Eyed Peas represent not only the Filipino community but audiences worldwide, and participating in the video was "a freaking cool thing". DJ E-Man, assistant program director and music director at Los Angeles' Power 106, also praised the project, saying it showed that music transcends language and culture. He noted that even though the label was not promoting "Bebot" to radio, the video itself demonstrated the group's influence and the universal power of music.

== Resurgence ==
At the start of 2026, people in the Philippines started sharing TikTok videos with the song "Bebot". In the clips, they showed their makeup transformations, often recreating early-2000s looks such as thin eyebrows, black eyeliner, and shiny lips. The trend soon reached viewers in other countries as well. At the same time, older OPM songs such as "Ale" by the Bloomfields became popular again due to people using them in similar social media videos.

During the song's renewed popularity, the Black Eyed Peas shared a 2019 interview about "Bebot" ahead of their performance at the Southeast Asian Games (SEA) closing ceremony. Will.i.am stated that the song reflects the group's connection to the Filipino community rather than an outside viewpoint. He also remembered hearing people in clubs shout "Puerto Rico!" as a show of pride in their culture. The song features both will.i.am and apl.de.ap chanting "Filipino!" in the chorus. Taboo said that when apl.de.ap performs "Bebot", fans chant "Filipino!", even where most do not speak Tagalog. He also praised apl.de.ap for representing the Philippines in pop culture through the song.

== Personnel ==
Credits are adapted from Apple Music.

Black Eyed Peas members

- William Adams – vocals, synthesiser, bass guitar, drum machine, songwriter, producer, engineer
- Allan Pineda – vocals, songwriter

Production

- Jason Villaroman – engineer
- Serban Ghenea – mixing engineer
- Brian Gardner – mastering engineer
- Jimmy Limon – organ, guitar, percussion, clavinet, bass guitar
