= A Wish for Christmas =

Studio album by Hangad
- Released: November 2006
- Genre: Inspirational
- Length: 18 minutes
- Label: Jesuit Music Ministry
- Producer: Jesuit Music Ministry / Hangad

Hangad chronology
The Easter Journey (2005)	A Wish for Christmas (2006)	Hangad: Noon at Ngayon (2008)

A Wish for Christmas is the fifth album recorded by Philippine-based vocal ensemble Hangad. It is also the group's second Christmas album, the first being Pasko Naming Hangad. It is Hangad's shortest album to date, with four tracks.

== Track listing ==
1. "Raymond's Lullaby"
  - Word and music by Marchan Padla and Paulo K. Tirol; vocal arrangement by P. Tirol; instrumental arrangement by J. Guevarra
2. "Child Emmanuel"
  - Words, music and arrangement by Nicky Reyes; instrumental arrangement by Julius Guevarra
3. "Paskong Pinoy Medley"
  - Arranged by P. Tirol
  - Paskong Pinoy Medley is composed of the following familiar Filipino Christmas songs, in this order:
    1. Gabing Payapa ("Peaceful night") – words and music by Felipe de Leon, Sr.
    2. Pasko na Naman ("It's Christmas-time again") – Words by Levi Celerio; music by F. de Leon, Jr.
    3. Himig Pasko ("Christmas melody") – Words and music by Serapio Ramos
    4. Maligayang Pasko at Masaganang Bagong Taon ("Ang Pasko Ay Sumapit") (Merry Christmas and a Prosperous New Year/Christmas Is Come) – words by L. Celerio, music by Vicente Rubi
    5. Thank You, ang Babait Ninyo ("Thank you, you're kind")- composer/lyricist unknown.
4. "Silent Night"
  - Words by Josef Mohr; music by Franz Gruber; arranged by P. Tirol
  - Hangad's version of Silent Night originally appears in their first Christmas album Pasko Naming Hangad (recorded in 2002)

== Credits ==
Instrumentalists

- Piano – Paulo K. Tirol, Nicky Reyes
- Acoustic Guitar – Toto Sorioso
- Electric bass – Brian Sergio
- Double bass/contrabass – Dave Harder
- MIDI programming – Julius Guevarra
- Drums – Dru Ubaldo, Mikah Azurin
- Guiro, African shaker, clave, electronic percussions – Julius Guevarra

Production

- Produced by the Jesuit Music Ministry
- Executive producer – JBoy Gonzales, SJ
- Production managers – Julius Guevarra and Mariel de Jesus
- Copywriting – Paulo Tirol

Engineering

- Recording engineer – Robbie Grande and Jett Galindo
- Mixing and mastering – Robbie Grande

Art

- Art direction – James Lin and Paulo K Tirol
- Art and layout – Jon Tolentino

== Raymond's Lullaby ==
Raymond's Lullaby is an original composition by Marchan Padla, a volunteer social worker at Ang Arko ng Pilipinas (an NGO for mentally handicapped children). "Raymond" is the name of one of Ang Arko's wards, who had autism. The final version of the song was the result of a collaboration between Marchan and Hangad. In accordance with Marchan Padla's original intent for writing the song, proceeds of the album will be donated to Ang Arko ng Pilipinas.

== Trivia ==
- As of 2016, The Easter Journey, A Wish for Christmas, and "Glory and Praise" are the only albums by Hangad that do not contain the word "hangad" in the title.
- The album's title "A Wish for Christmas" is taken from the stanzas of Raymond's Lullaby.
- The executive producer of A Wish for Christmas, JBoy Gonzales SJ, composed Panunumpa, which appears on Hangad's self-titled debut album.
- In the Philippines, the Thank You song at the end of Paskong Pinoy Medley is commonly sung by children at the end of house-to-house carollings . The identity of this song's composer or lyricist is unknown.
