= Hangad =

Background information
- Origin: Quezon City, Philippines
- Genres: Christian music
- Years active: 1991–present
- Label: Jesuit Music Ministry

Hangád (Tagalog: "yearning" or "desire") is an inspirational vocal ensemble known for songs like Pananatili, Pagkakaibigan, and Panunumpâ (covered by pop singer Carol Banawa). It consists of former members of Days with the Lord.

== History ==
=== Origins ===
Hangad's origins begin with the Days with the Lord (DWTL) retreat/recollection at the all-boys Ateneo de Manila High School. In need of a singing group for their own group, Chad Arcinue and Lance Lazatin recruited classmates and friends. A high school faculty member, Gabby Mallillin, encouraged the then-unnamed group to sing in the next DWTL sessions.

Because of this, the same group of people would often find themselves participating in school activities. As the members were known to be participants of the DWTL seminars, the group has often been mistaken for the DWTL's "official" choir. Hence, in October 1991, the group decided to establish their own identity and adapted the name Hangad. Hangad made its debut concert in 1992.

By the time they were in college, Hangad began to accept female members, initially from high schools and colleges such as College of the Holy Spirit, Miriam College and Stella Maris. The reconstituted Hangad continued with their participation in activities at the Ateneo de Manila University, including masses; the newly reorganized group also held its first concert in 1994. For their service to the university community, they were awarded the Dean's Award for Service.

=== Career ===
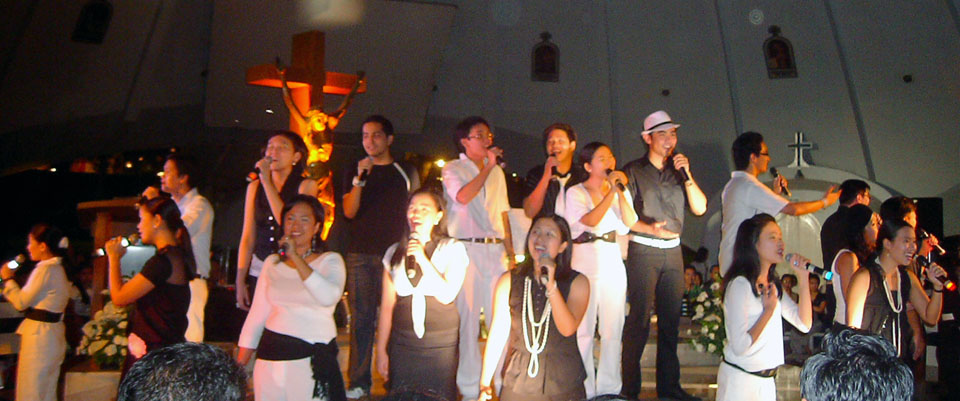
Hangad performing a number at their 15th anniversary concert.

In 1998, Hangad was offered a recording contract by the Jesuit Music Ministry; that same year, the group released its self-titled debut album, Hangad. Hangad later re-released its album in CD format in 2000, with six new songs. In December 2001, they also released their first music video for the song, Pananatili, which enjoyed regular telecasts at TV stations ABS-CBN, PTV, TV5, IBC, and TFC (and continues to this day).

In 2006, Hangad won an Awit Award for Best Inspirational or Religious Song.

Hangad has appeared on several notable events by the National Commission for Culture and the Arts, Catholic Mass Media Awards, the Awit Awards. They have performed with other notable Filipino singers like Basil Valdez, Gary Valenciano, the APO Hiking Society and Noel Cabangon. They have also lent their voices and music for Philippine television shows as the children's show Batibot (now out of production) and the Saturday cooking special Del Monte Kitchenomics (currently shown on GMA Network).

Besides their musical work, they also participate in outreach projects and fundraisers. In addition, they also conduct workshops for parish-based choirs.

== Discography ==
- Hangad (in cassette, 1998; in CD, 2000, with six additional tracks)
- Hangad a Capella (2002)
- Pasko Naming Hangad (2002) (Tag. Christmas, Our Desire)
- The Easter Journey (2005)
- A Wish for Christmas (2006)
- Hangad: Noon at Ngayon (2008)
- Dwells God (2010) (A collaboration project with Himig Heswita)
- This Time With You (2011)
- Glory And Praise (2016)
- Magalak (2018)
- Bawat Pintig (2024)
- Missa ng Pag-asa (2025)

== Awards ==
- Hangad was awarded the Dean's Award by the Ateneo de Manila University for their contributions to the university's community.
- Pasko Naming Hangad was nominated in the Awit Awards in 2003 for Best Album Packaging for Pasko Naming Hangad.
- In 2006, Hangad won an Awit Award in Best Inspirational or Religious Song for Pieta (Oyayi sa Paanan ni Hesus) (Tag. Pieta: Lullabye at the Foot of Jesus' Cross). They bested out more popular nominees for the same category such as Gary Valenciano (who was nominated thrice in the same category) and Christian Bautista.
- In 2019, Hangad has received an Awit Award nomination for Best Christmas Recording, for Magalak sa Kapanganakan ("Rejoice in Christ's Coming"). The song is from their Magalak album (2018), which features an all-original Advent and Christmas line-up composed and arranged by Hangad members.

== See also ==
- Bukas Palad Music Ministry
