= Hangad (album) =

Studio album by Hangad
- Released: June 24, 2000
- Genre: Inspirational
- Length: 89 minutes
- Label: Jesuit Music Ministry
- Producer: Jesuit Music Ministry/Hangad

Hangad chronology
Hangad (2000)	Hangad a Capella (2002)

Hangad is the self-titled debut album of the Philippine-based vocal ensemble Hangad. It contains the singles "Pananatili" and "Panunumpa", the latter of which was popularized by pop singer Carol Banawa.

It was twice released, first in cassette tape, then in compact disc. The cassette version was first released in 1998. The album was re-launched on compact disc (with six new songs), on June 24, 2000, at the Aldaba Recital Hall, UP Theater, UP Diliman, Quezon City.

== Track listing ==
=== Cassette track listing ===
English translation of Tagalog titles are provided in parentheses. Note: these translations are not official.
A-side

1. "Pagbabasbas" ("Benediction")
  - Words by Rene Javellana, SJ; music by Jandi Arboleda and Manoling Francisco, SJ; arranged by Paulo Tirol
2. "Now We Remain"
  - Words and music by David Haas; arranged by P. Tirol
3. "Pagkakaibigan" ("Friendship")
  - Words and Music by Charlie Cenzon, SJ (based on John 15); arrangement by Arnel Aquino, SJ; additional arrangement by P. Tirol
4. "Panunumpa" ("The Promise")
  - Words and music by JBoy Gonzales, SJ; arranged by P. Tirol
5. "One Thing I Ask"
  - setting by P. Tirol (based on Psalm 27:4-8)
6. "Awit ng Paghilom" ("Healing Song")
  - Words and music by A. Aquino, SJ
7. "Inang Mahal" ("Beloved Mother")
  - Words and music by Rene San Andres, based on the "Hail, Holy Queen"; arranged by Norman Agatep

B-side

1. "Pananatili" (lit. "To remain")
  - Words and music by Noel Miranda (based on Ruth 1:16-17); arranged by P. Tirol
2. "Ama Namin" ("Our Father")
  - setting by M. Francisco, SJ; arranged by P. Tirol
3. "The Presence of Jesus"
  - Words and music by David Haas
4. "Pag-ibig Ko" ("My Love")
  - Words and music by Charlie Cenzon, SJ; arranged by Paolo Paculan
5. "Prayer To A Beautiful God"
  - Words by Mark Lopez (based on the "Our Father"); music and arrangement by P. Tirol
6. "Hangad" ("Yearning" or "Desire")
  - words and music by P. Tirol
7. "Pagbabasbas" (reprise) ("Benediction")
  - Words by R. Javellana, SJ; music by J. Arboleda and M . Francisco, SJ; arranged by P. Tirol

=== CD track listing ===
1. "Umawit Kayo!"
  - Words, music and arrangement by Arnel Aquino SJ
2. "Pagbabasbas" (a cappella version)
3. "Panunumpa"
4. "The Presence Of Jesus"
  - Words, music and arrangement by David Haas
5. "Psalm 73"
  - Setting by M. Francisco, SJ; arranged by P. Tirol
6. "Pagkakaibigan"
7. "Prayer To A Beautiful God"
8. "Pag-ibig Ko"
9. "One Thing I Ask"
10. "Now We Remain"
11. "Aba, Ginoong Maria" ("Hail Mary")
  - setting by P. Tirol
12. "Inang Mahal"
13. "Awit Ng Paghilom"
14. "Simeon's Canticle"
  - Setting by M. Francisco, SJ (based on Luke 2:29-32); Additional text and arrangement by P. Tirol
15. "Pananatili"
16. "Ama Namin"
17. "In Your Darkest Hour"
  - Words by P. Tirol and Mark Lopez; music by P. Tirol
18. "Hangad"
19. "Bayan, Magsiawit Na!" ("Sing, Nation of God)
  - Words and music by A. Aquino, SJ; additional arrangement by James Bitanga
20. "Pagbabasbas" (instrumental)

=== Differences between the cassette and the CD ===
- The CD has six new tracks: "Umawit Kayo", "Psalm 73", "Aba Ginoong Maria", "Simeon's Canticle", "In Your Darkest Hour" and "Bayan Magsiawit na!"
- On the CD, "Pananatili" has an additional flute part on the first chorus.
- On the CD, "Inang Mahal" has an additional rhythm guitar section
- The rhythm tracks for the acoustic version of "Pagbabasbas" on the cassette (Track 14) serves as the instrumental version of the same song on the CD (Track 20). However, this instrumental version is immediately after "Bayan, Magsiawit Na!"; on the CD, and both songs appear as one track (Track 19). In addition, the instrumental version of "Pagbabasbas" is not listed on the CDs inlay card.

== Pananatili music video ==
In December 1991, Hangad released a music video for "Pananatili", featuring a story about a woman writing a letter to her husband, who is working in another province. Some scenes were shot at the Manila Central Post Office building. Hangad members played part of the cast; members Lissa Fontanilla and Teejay Ortiz played the husband-and-wife pair. It was shown on major television stations and still enjoys regular broadcasts on RPN-9 (now known as RPTV) and IBC-13.

For the music video of "Simeon's Canticle", see Pasko Naming Hangad.

== Credits ==
Instrumentalists

- Piano - Paulo K. Tirol and Arnel Aquino, SJ (for tracks 1 and 19 only)
- Guitar - Paolo Paculan and James Bitanga (for tracks 1 and 19 only)
- Flute - Jay Gomez
- Violin - Mayos Esmilla
- String Quartet - Alfred Santos (violin), Cynthia Sanchez (violin), Girlie Sanchez (viola), Chino Sanchez (Cello)
- Rhythm guitars - Jerry Coloma III
- Bass guitar - Derek Ileto
- Drums/percussion - Duds Rarela

Production

- Produced by the Jesuit Music Ministry and Hangad
- Recording Engineers - Dodjie Fernandez (Digitrax Recording Studios); Byron Bryant and Eric Mangune (Republic of Sounds under Circle of Fifths studio)
- Digital Mixing - Dodjie Fernandez
- Digital Mastering - Regie Ampas

Album Art

- Art - Dave Duran
- Photography - Isabel Templo
- Design - Kite Lacuesta

Songbook

- For Hangad: Himig at Titik (1998)
  - Score layout - Monchu Lucero
  - Encoding - Chad Arcinue, Tabby Dans, Dave Duran, Leanne Laudico, Monchu Lucero, Paulo Tirol
  - Text - Mariel de Jesus
  - Layout, illustrations and cover art- Dave Duran
  - Cover Design - Kite Lacuesta
  - Photography - Isabel Templo/SADIDAYA Disenyo
- For Hangad: Himig at Titik, Updated Edition (2004)
  - Production manager - TJ San Jose
  - Score design and layout - Monchu Lucero (Luxis Graphikos)
  - Editors - Elaine Aliga, Cha Lagrisola, Monchu Lucero, JC Uy
  - Encoders - Cha Lagrisola, Monchu Lucero, Nicky Reyes, Louis Ricohermoso, Clare Royandoyan, TJ San Jose, Paulo Tirol
  - Lyrics and chord preparation - Cha Lagrisola, Clare Royandoyan, TJ San Jose, Bea Siojo
  - Copywriters - Mariel de Jesus, Trin Panganiban-Custodio, Paulo Tirol
  - Book design - Monchu Lucero
  - Photography - Isabel Templo
  - Album design - Kite Lacuesta
