= Hangad a Capella =

Studio album by Hangad
- Released: June 23, 2002
- Recorded: June 23, 2002
- Genre: Inspirational
- Length: 72 minutes
- Label: Jesuit Music Ministry
- Producer: Jesuit Music Ministry/Hangad

Hangad chronology
Hangad (1998/2000)	Hangad a Capella (2002)	Pasko Naming Hangad (2002)

Hangad a Capella is the second album recorded by Philippine-based vocal ensemble Hangad. As the title says, all songs in this album were recorded without any musical accompaniment. Most songs in a Capella are arrangements of familiar Filipino religious and inspirational songs; with the exception of two tracks, a Capella was indeed to be a collection of songs composed by Jesuit composers.

Hangad a Capella was launched on June 23, 2002, at the Oratory of St. Ignatius at the Ateneo de Manila University, Quezon City.

== Track listing ==
English translation of Tagalog titles are provided in parentheses. Note: these translations are not official.

1. Papuri (Praise)
  - Words and music by Jandi Arboleda and Chito Salazar; music by Norman Agatep; arranged by Paulo K. Tirol
2. Panalangin Sa Pagiging Bukas-Palad (Prayer for Generosity)
  - Words by Tim Ofrasio (after Saint Ignatius of Loyola); music by M. Francisco, SJ and J. Arboleda; original arrangement by Renard Romen (for Chanson); additional arrangement by P. Tirol
3. Pilgrim's Theme (Greater Scheme Of Things)
  - Words by Johnny Go, SJ; music by M. Francisco, SJ; arrangement by P. Tirol
4. Kahanga-hanga (How wondrous is your name, O Lord)
  - Words by Eduardo Hontiveros, SJ, and Redentor Corpus (based on Psalm 8); music by E. Hontiveros, SJ; arranged by P. Tirol
5. Pastoral
  - Words by Frances Caryll Houselander; music by M. Francisco, SJ; arranged by JC Uy
6. Inay (Mother)
  - Words and music by Arnel Aquino, SJ; arranged by P. Tirol
7. Anima Christi
  - Music by J. Arboleda (based on the prayer by Saint Ignatius of Loyola); arranged by P. Tirol
8. Kapuri-puri Ka (Blessed are You, Lord)
  - Music by Nemy Que, SJ (based on the Roman Missal); arrangement by JC Uy
9. Paghahandog (Offering)
  - lyrics based on Sume et Suspice by St. Ignatius of Loyola; music by Rene San Andres; arrangement by P. Tirol (based on original string arrangement by Doris Estallo)
10. Panginoon, Aking Tanglaw (Oh Lord, My Light)
  - Words by Tim Ofrasio, SJ (based on Psalm 27); music by Fruto Ramirez, SJ; arrangement by P. Tirol
11. You Are Near
  - Words and music by Dan Schutte (based on Psalm 139); arranged by JC Uy
12. Sabay Sa Ihip Ng Hangin (Together with the wind blowing)
  - Words and music by Vincent de Jesus
13. Sa Diyos Lamang Mapapanatag (My soul rests with the Lord)
  - Words by Danny Isidro, SJ; music by N. Que, SJ; arranged by JC Uy
14. Ang Puso Ko'y Nagpupuri (Magnificat) (My heart rejoices)
  - setting by E. Hontiveros, SJ (based on the Magnificat, Luke 1:46-55); arranged by P. Tirol
15. Gabii (Gabi) (Night)
  - Music by P. Tirol

== Magnificat Music Video ==
For this album, Hangad produced a music video for Magnificat (Ang Puso Ko'y Nagpupuri). Shooting locations were on several Line 2 stations and the Church of the Gesu in the Ateneo de Manila University campus.

As with the Pananatili music video, Hangad members appears in the cast. It was shown on major television stations and still enjoys regular broadcasts on RPN-9 and IBC-13.

== Credits ==
Production

- Executive producer - Ari Dy, SJ
- Production Manager - Chad Arcinue
- Mixing andmastering engineer - Ditoy Aguila
- Recording engineer - Willan Caimol
- Assistant recording engineer - Toto Sorioso
- Inlay design and illustration, album art and direction - Karissa Villa (for East Axis Creative, Inc.)

Songbook For Hangad A Capella: Vocal Arrangements (2002)

- Production manager - Monchu Lucero
- Score design and layout - Monchu Lucero (Luxis Graphikos)
- Editors - Monchu Lucero, JC Uy
- Encoders - Chad Arcinue, Julius Guevarra, Atoy Salazar, Paulo Tirol, JC Uy
- Copy editors - Mariel de Jesus, Paulo Tirol, JC Uy
- Additional copy -Arnel Aquino, SJ; Nemy Que, SJ; Rene San Andres; Norman Agatep, Johnny Go, SJ
- Cover design -Karissa Villa (East Axis Creative)
- Additional design - Kyle Baizas

== Trivia ==
- Gabii does not have any lyrics; it is a number sung in humming fashion.
- Sabay sa Ihip ng Hangin and Gabii are the only songs in this album that were not composed by Jesuit priests or religious persons.
- Sabay sa Ihip ng Hangin was originally intended as a love song.
- Guest composer Vincent de Jesus composed the soundtrack for the ABS-CBN telenovela Bituing Walang Ningning and for the award-winning movie Crying Ladies (for which he won an Urian Award)
- According to the Hangad a Capella songbook, Panalangin sa Pagbubukas-palad was recorded in memory of Renard Romen's 10th death anniversary.
