= The Easter Journey =

Studio album by Hangad
- Released: February 27, 2005
- Genre: Inspirational
- Length: 76 minutes
- Label: Jesuit Music Ministry
- Producer: Jesuit Music Ministry / Hangad

Hangad chronology
Pasko Naming Hangad (2002)	The Easter Journey (2005)	A Wish for Christmas (2006)

The Easter Journey is the fourth album recorded by Philippine-based vocal ensemble Hangad. The album contains all-original songs intended to be performed for the Easter liturgy in the Roman Catholic Church. It also includes an almost complete set of songs for the Holy Mass, the Lord, Have Mercy prayer having been omitted.

Easter Journey was launched in cassettes and CDs on February 27, 2005, at the Church of Gesu in Ateneo de Manila University, Quezon City.

== Track listing ==
All writing, music, and arrangements (instrumental and choral) were provided by Paulo K. Tirol except where noted.

No.	Title	Lyrics	Music	Notes	Length
1.	"The Easter Journey"
2.	"Children Of Light And Of The Morning"			Words based on the Eucharistic Prayer of the Holy Mass for the Easter liturgy; orchestral arrangement by Dennis Reyes III.
3.	"Awit Ng Paghilom" (Song of Healing)	Arnel Aquino	Arnel Aquino
4.	"Glory To God"			Based on the text from the Roman Missal.
5.	"Psalm 33" (The earth is full of the goodness of the Lord)
6.	"Without Seeing You"	David Haas	David Haas	Arranged by JC Uy.
7.	"Gospel Acclamation & Alleluia"			Based on the text from the Roman Missal.
8.	"Pieta (Oyayi Sa Paanan Ni Hesus)" "Pieta (Lullabye at the Feet of Jesus' Cross"	Michelle Joy Francia		Cello arrangement by Jay Gomez.
9.	"Presentation Of The Gifts"			Text from the Roman Missal; additional lyrics by Paulo Tirol.
10.	"Love Untold"
11.	"Holy"			Based on the text from the Roman Missal.
12.	"Memorial Acclamation"			Based on the text from the Roman Missal.
13.	"Doxology & Great Amen"			Based on the text from the Roman Missal.
14.	"The Lord's Prayer"
15.	"Acclamation To The Lord's Prayer"
16.	"Lamb Of God"			Based on the text from the Roman Missal.
17.	"Here In This Place"	D. Haas	D. Haas	Arranged by JC Uy.
18.	"Out Of The Night"	Nicky Reyes and Julius Guevarra	Nicky Reyes
19.	"Jagged Pieces"			Arranged by J. Guevarra.
20.	"Recessional Hymn (Go and tell every nation)"
21.	"Praise Be To God"			Adapted from Psalms 148 and 150.
22.	"Send Your Spirit"			Choral arrangement by JC Uy; strings arrangement by Dennis Reyes III.
23.	"Queen Of Heaven, Rejoice"			Based on the Regina coeli responsory.

== Credits ==
Instrumentalists

- Piano - Paulo Tirol
- Flute - Jay Gomez
- Violins - Bernadette Cadorniga, Catherine Magallon, Antonio Bautista, Corrina Lapena
- Viola - Antonio Bautista, Francisco Llorin
- Cello - Eduardo Pasamba, Francisco Llorin
- Double Bass - Delfin Calderon
- Trumpet - Raymund de Leon
- Trombone -Sumin Kim
- French Horns - Melvin Rioveros, Dondon Lucena
- Acoustic Guitar - Toto Sorioso, Nobel Queano, Francisco Buencamino, Criss Buenviaje
- Electric Guitar - Dolf Cruz
- Electric Bass - Joon Guillen
- Drums - Jazz Nicolas
- Percussions - Carla Pido

Production

- Executive producer - JBoy Gonzales
- Project manager - Julius Guevarra
- Musical direction - Paulo Tirol and JC Uy
- Coordinator - Lissa Fontanilla
- Production team - Mariel de Jesus, Elaine Aliga, TJ San Jose, Chrise Cortez, Nicky Reyes, Trin Panganiban, Monchu Lucero

Engineering

- Mixing and Mastering Engineer - Robbie Grande
- Recording Engineers - Willan Caimol, Jay Gomez, Toto Sorioso

Art

- Album design coordinator - Louis Ricohermoso
- Photography - Dave Fabros
- Pictorial art direction - Bryan Atienza
- Inlay design and illustration, album art direction - Mad Banana: A Motion and Design Company

Songbook

- Production manager - TJ San Jose
- Editors - JC Uy, Pulo Tirol, Julius Guevarra
- Encoders - Rose VBina, Julius Guevarra, Louis Ricohermoso, Clare Royandoyan, Toby Sandoval, Bea Siojo, Nicky Reyes
- Copywriters - Trin Panganiban-Custodio, Mariel de Jesus, MJ Francia, Paulo Tirol
- Design coordinator - Louis Rocohermoso
- Design and illustration, art direction - Mad Banana: A Motion and Design Company

== Award ==
Pieta (Oyayi sa Paanan ni Hesus) won an Awit Award for Best Inspiration or Religious Song for Hangad, besting other songs recorded by more popular artists like Gary Valenciano (who was thrice nominated in the same category) and Christian Bautista.
