= The Speaks =

Filipino-American alternative rock band

- Also known as: The Speakeasies (1999)
- Origin: Washington, D.C., United States
- Genres: Alternative rock; Pinoy rock; post-grunge; pop rock
- Years active: 1999–2009; 2011; 2014; 2018; 2022–present
- Labels: MCA; Warner Philippines
- Members: Rafael Toledo; Jerry Delino; Archie dela Cruz; Cal Stamp; Derek Lee
- Past members: Siegfred Fuster; John Abelende; Ben Tufts; Nollie County; Myk Menez; Aeron Covenant

The Speaks is Filipino-American alternative rock band composed of mostly Filipinos and Filipino-Americans, although later members of the band were not all Filipino. The band members include guitarist Cal Stamp, bassist Jerry Delino, drummer Derek Lee, vocalist Rafael Toledo, and acoustic and rhythm Archie dela Cruz. Original members included percussionist John Abelende, lead guitarist Siegfred Fuster and rhythm guitarist Myk Menez. The band was established in Washington, D.C. during the late 1990s. The band is notably remembered for their hit songs "High" and "Life's a Joke". Their album, according to the Manila Bulletin, debuted at number one on the Filetopia online radio station in the United Kingdom. The album, entitled This Is the Time was a hit on Asian radio charts (including Magic 89.9's Final Countdown, and in the top 20 of 97.1 WLS-FM). Their music videos have been featured on MTV Asia and Myx. The Washington Post declared the band as one of the top 5 bands in 2009.

The Washington, D.C.–based band won competitions such as the JAXX "World's Largest Battle of the Bands" (2003), the DC Hard Rock Café/SoBe "Ultimate Altitude Buzz" Battle of the Bands Finals (2003), and the DC 101 "Last Band Standing" competition (2004).

The band was co-managed by Rob Shipp and Jerry Garcia.

== Band members ==
=== Current members ===
- Rafael Toledo – lead vocals (1999–2009, 2011, 2014, 2018, 2022–present)
- Archie dela Cruz – acoustic, rhythm (1999–2009, 2011, 2014, 2018, 2022–present)
- Jerry Delino – bass (1999–2009, 2011, 2014, 2018, 2022–present)
- Cal Stamp – lead guitars (2008–2009, 2011, 2014, 2018, 2022–present)
- Derek Lee – drums, percussion (2008–2009, 2011, 2014, 2018, 2022–present)

=== Early members ===
- Siegfred Fuster – lead guitars (1999–2008)
- John Abelende – drums, percussion (1999–2008)
- Nollie County – lead guitars (2008–2009)
- Ben Tufts – drums, percussion (2008–2009)
- Myk Menez – rhythm guitars (2008–2009)
- Aeron Covenant – acoustic, rhythm (2008–2009)

== Discography ==
=== Albums ===
- Life's a Joke (2003) (import version released in 2005)
- This is the Time (2007) (import version released in 2008)
- The Price of Freedom (2011)

=== Singles ===
- "High" (demo version released in 2003, studio version released in 2005)
- "Life's a Joke"
- "Runaway"
- "Regret"
- "Bizarre Love Triangle" (New Order cover)
- "Ang Himig Natin" (Juan de la Cruz Band cover)
