= Aurora Tower (Cubao) =

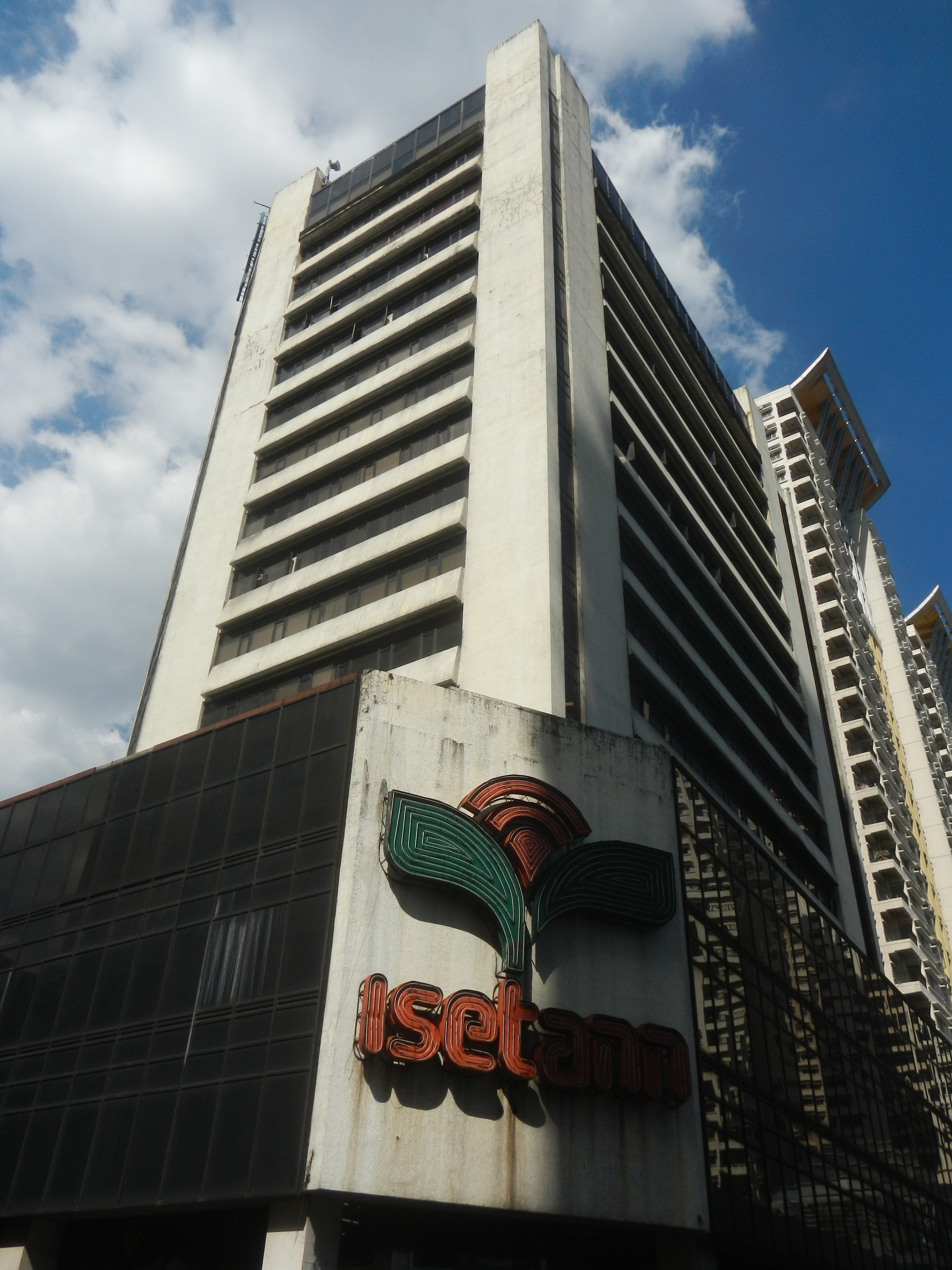
- The Aurora Tower, taken in 2017.

General information
- Status: Completed
- Type: Mixed Use
- Location: General Malvar Avenue, Araneta City, Quezon City
- Coordinates: 14°37′23″N 121°03′14″E
- Completed: 1984
- Owner: Araneta Group
- Operator: Araneta Group

Height
- Roof: 83 m (272.31 ft)

Technical details
- Floor count: 22
- Floor area: 26,342 m^{2} (283,542.93 sq ft)
- Lifts/elevators: 3

Design and construction
- Developer: Araneta Group

The Aurora Tower is a 22-storey mixed-use, high-rise tower located along Aurora Boulevard, in the Araneta City complex in Quezon City. The tower serves as the former headquarters of the Araneta Group and also houses Isetann Department Store and Supermarket within the tower's retail and underground sections.

== Location ==
The Aurora Tower is located in the northern area of the Araneta City and sits along Aurora Boulevard, and is also situated along General Malvar and General Aguinaldo Avenues. The tower is located beside the Manhattan Parkway of the Manhattan Gardens complex and is also across the New Frontier Theater. The tower is also close to the Gateway Office Building, the Gateway Malls 1 and 2, and the Araneta Center-Cubao LRT Station.

== History ==
The Aurora Tower began construction in the early 1980s and was eventually completed in 1984. The tower got its namesake after Aurora Boulevard, a major road located within the northern side of the tower, and is owned and developed by the Araneta Group, which later served as the headquarters of the company and its subsidiaries after moving from the Doña Consolacion Building along General Santos Avenue. The Araneta Group remained as the tower's main tenant until 2014, as the company moved its headquarters to the nearby Gateway Tower. Standing at the height of 83 m (272.31 ft) tall, the Aurora Tower was one of the tallest buildings in Quezon City and in Metro Manila during its completion, and maintained its title until 1998, with the completion and the opening of the IBM Plaza in Eastwood City in 1998, which stands at 98 m (321.52 ft) tall. The tower was also once the tallest building in the Araneta Center complex and was later surpassed by the completion of taller buildings along the complex such as the Manhattan Parkway Towers in 2011.

In late 1985, the tower's retail and lower ground spaces were occupied by Isetann Department Store and Supermarket, wherein Isetann Department Store occupies the tower's first five upper floors, while the Isetann Supermarket occupies the tower's lower ground spaces. The Araneta Group and its subsidiaries also followed suit in moving their operations to the tower a few months later, and once occupied four topmost office floors of the tower. The Aurora Tower was later certified as a Philippine Economic Zone Authority (PEZA) certified information technology (IT) building in 2006, following under Proclamation no. 985 of former president Gloria Macapagal Arroyo. On 4 December 2015, the tower encountered a fire at the tower's 14th level, and reached the fifth alarm. The fire also caused its tenant Isetann to temporarily halt its operations for the day, and the fire was later extinguished and fire out was declared at 12:38AM PST.

== Tenants and Features ==
The tower has a wide variety of features, such as retail spaces in the lower ground and first five floors, a cafeteria on the 6th floor, office spaces in the middle-level floors, penthouse units at the topmost floors, and a helipad at the tower's roofdeck. The tower is occupied by the offices of the Honorary Consulate of Colombia; Binibining Pilipinas, which occupies the 8th floor of the tower, while keeping its headquarters at the Gateway Tower, and other local firms. The tower also formerly housed the Embassy of Colombia, until the Embassy later moved to a new location at the Inoza Tower in the Bonifacio Global City.
