= Art in Island =

Interactive art exhibition in Quezon City, Philippines

Art In Island
- Art In Island in 2026
- Established: December 25, 2014; 11 years ago
- Location: Cubao, Quezon City, Metro Manila, Philippines
- Coordinates: 14°37′21.4″N 121°03′27.4″E
- Type: Interactive art exhibition
- Collection size: 100+ interactive artworks

Art In Island: 3D Art Gallery is an interactive art exhibition, or "selfie museum", in Cubao in Quezon City, Metro Manila, Philippines.

== History ==
The initial exhibits were completed within four months by 18 Korean visual artists. It opened on December 25, 2014.

== Facilities and exhibits ==
Art In Island is housed within a two-storey building covering 3,800 square metres (41,000 sq ft). Marketed as the "biggest 3D museum in Asia", exhibits are primarily murals which rely on optical illusions, which causes the two-dimensional works to be perceived as three-dimensional. Visitors are encouraged to photograph themselves to become "part" of the compositions. In 2015, Art In Island had around 100 unique paintings, including works derived from the Mona Lisa by Leonardo da Vinci and The Scream by Edvard Munch.

== See also ==
- Dessert Museum
