= Stella Maris College Quezon City =

Roman Catholic college in Quezon City, Philippines

Stella Maris College
- Motto: Ad Veritatem, Per Caritatem
- Motto in English: To Truth, Through Charity
- Type: Private, Catholic Franciscan, Coeducational basic and higher education institution
- Established: 1955
- Location: 891 Cambridge Street, Cubao,, Quezon City, Metro Manila, Philippines; 14°37′26.90″N 121°3′13.40″E
- Hymn: Hail Stella Maris
- Colors: Blue and white
- Nickname: Stellan
- Website: stellamariscollegeqc.edu.ph
- Location in Metro Manila Location in Luzon Location in the Philippines

Stella Maris College is a private Catholic college in Quezon City, Philippines. It is under the Franciscan Missionaries of Mary.

== History ==
A religious Institute founded in India on January 6, 1877, by Helene Philippine de Chappotin, known as Mother Mary of the Passion. Since then, the Institute has grown to more than 8,000 sisters of 80 nationalities and working in 76 countries worldwide.

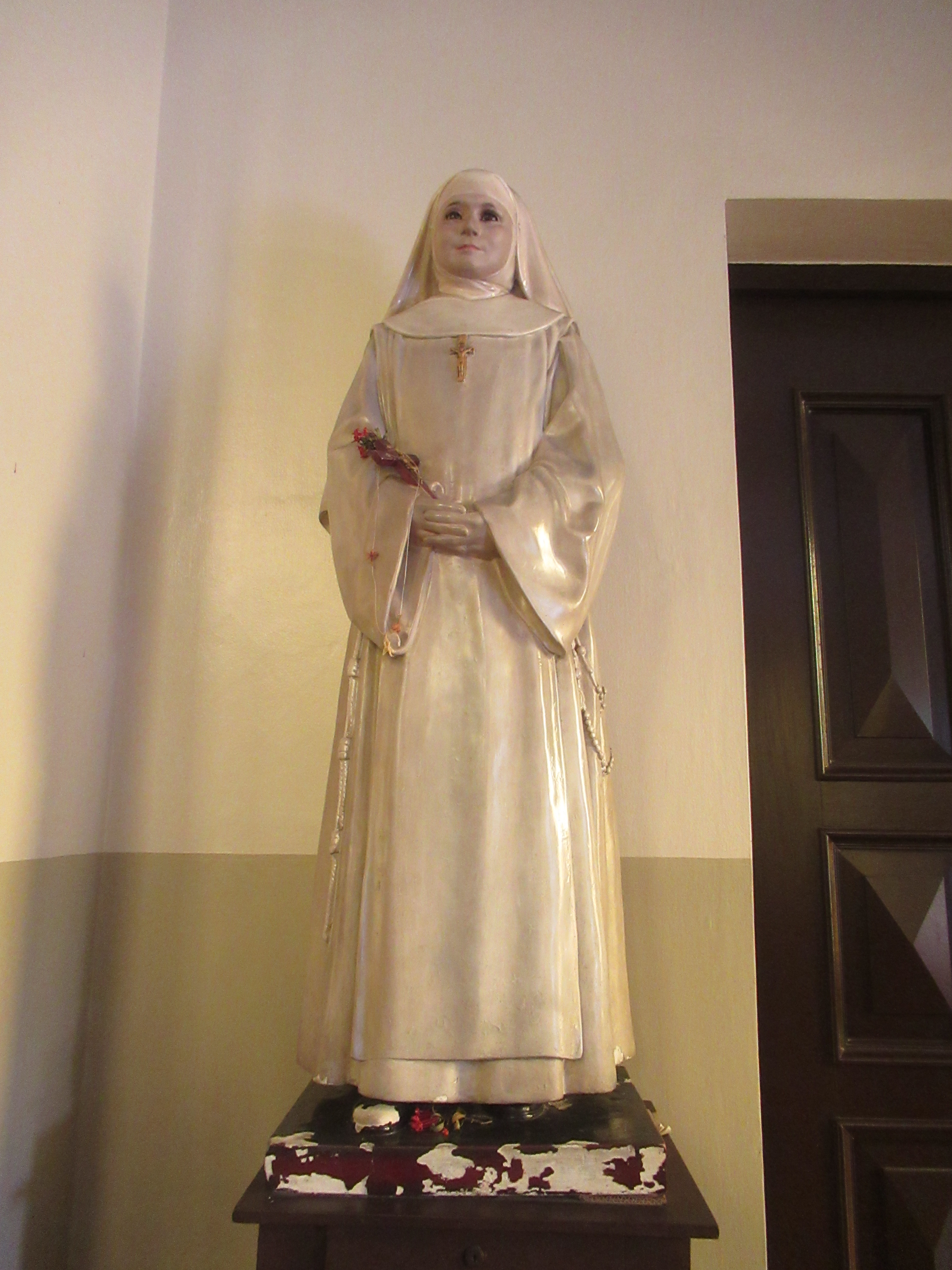
Hélène Marie de Chappotin de Neuville

Twelve FMMs first came to the Philippines on December 10, 1912 through the invitation of Msgr. Petrelli, the first bishop of Lipa, Batangas. With evangelization and the development of women as their primary concern, they chose the establishment of schools as the best means to obtain this purpose. They successively established six educational institutions in Luzon, Visayas and Mindanao. Today only 3 FMM schools remain in operation: St. Josephs Academy in Sariaya, Quezon, Stella Maris College, Oroquieta City, and Stella Maris College, Quezon City.

Stella Maris College in Quezon City was built partially out of the war damage reparation received by the FMMs after World War II. The cornerstone was laid on August 15, 1954, and the Articles of Incorporation were signed on February 23, 1955. The first members of the Board of Trustees were as follows: Mother Maria Margolari (Spanish), Mother Maria Luitgard (German), Mother Maria Reina Paz (Filipina), Mother Mary Eadgitha, (Filipina), Mother Maria Coronacion (Filipina). The first Directress was Sr. Luitgard.

On June 13, 1955, the school dedicated to Mary under the title of “Stella Maris" (Star of the Sea) opened its doors to over 900 students, offering elementary, high school, and college education.

With the increase in enrollment, the high school building, named after St. Francis, was constructed in September 1960 and was ready for occupancy in June 1961. A new college building was also opened in 1968.

The College Department was phased out by 1975 due to the increasing maintenance cost. The Religion Teachers Course of Loreto, College in Legarda was transferred to the college building that same year and is now called the Lumen Christi Catechetical Center. Today, it offers a credited Religious Education Course.

A three-storey building was constructed in 2000 with the canteen on the first floor, six classrooms for the elementary students in the second floor and six classrooms for the secondary students on the third floor. It was named after St. Hermine, who with six other FMM sisters, was canonized on October 1, 2000.

As part of its mission to help the poor, SMC has accepted kindergarten pupils since 1991 and graduates from the public elementary schools in 2008 from among the financially challenged families in the area, providing them with free education until they graduate from high school. In 2013, SMC accepted elementary graduates from public schools nearby to avail of free education.

The school was originally granted recognition by the government as an institution exclusively for girls. The Grade School Department opened its doors to Grade One boys in June 2002, while the High School Department began this move in 2006.

In June 2011, the following changes were introduced: institutionalization of the Basic Education Department consisting of the Grade School and High School Units and the implementation of the Central Visayan Institute Foundation – Dynamic Learning Program Spirituality as Core of the Curriculum (CV1F-DLP-SCC) starting in the High School Unit. In the succeeding years, CVIF-DLP-SCC was cascaded to Grade Six and Grade Five respectively.

Stella Maris College celebrated its 60th founding anniversary in 2015. The entire school community together with Stella Maris College-Family Council (SWIC–FC) and Stella Marts College Alumni Association (SMCAA) worked together for an ex-voto, the renovation of the auditorium.

A four storey building named after Blessed Mary of the Passion, Foundress of the Franciscan Missionaries of Mary, was constructed in 2015 in preparation for the full implementation of K-12 during Academic Year 2016-2017.

== Stella Maris uniform ==
The school apparel for the female students are patterned after uniforms worn by sailors. The high school uniform has a white long-sleeved blouse, with the blue marine collar and sailor's necktie. A series of buttons connects to the skirt. The primary school uniform is similar to the high school uniform except for the long sleeves, cravat and the shorter dress. For the grade 7 (starting on the year 2012) they have the same design but they have longer sleeves than grade school (3/4) grade 7 also wears gala.

== Gallery ==
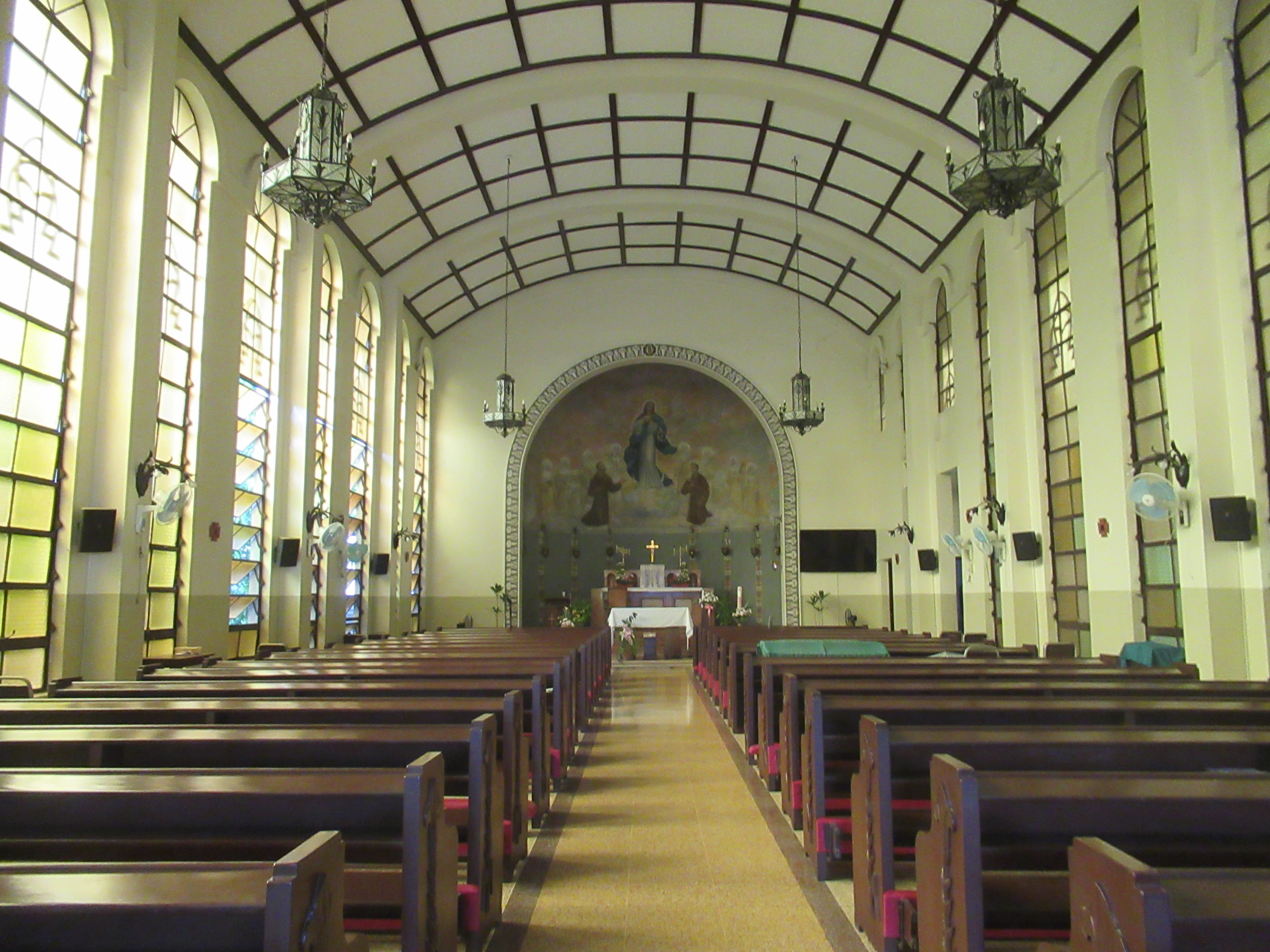
Chapel

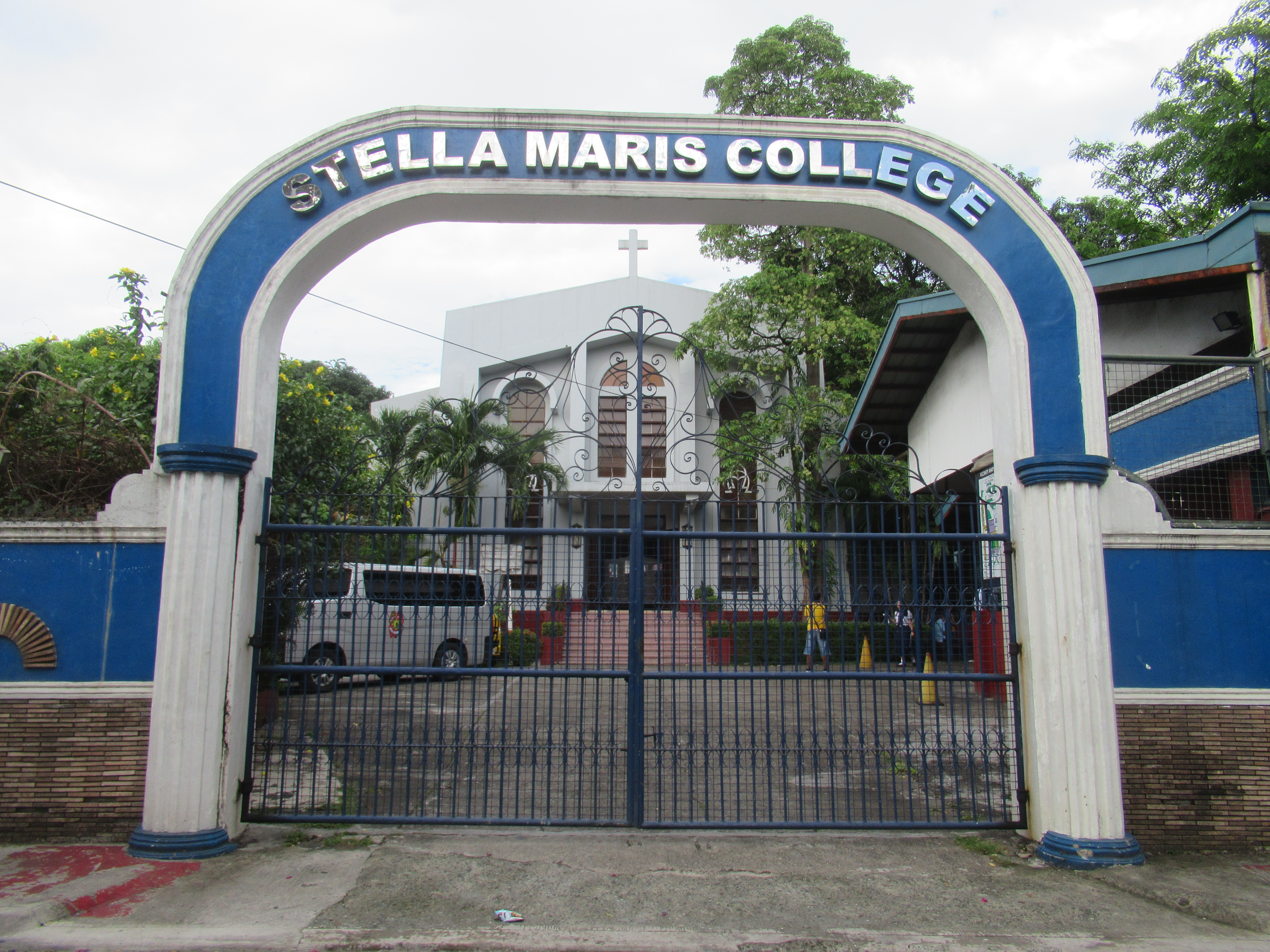
Gates and chapel

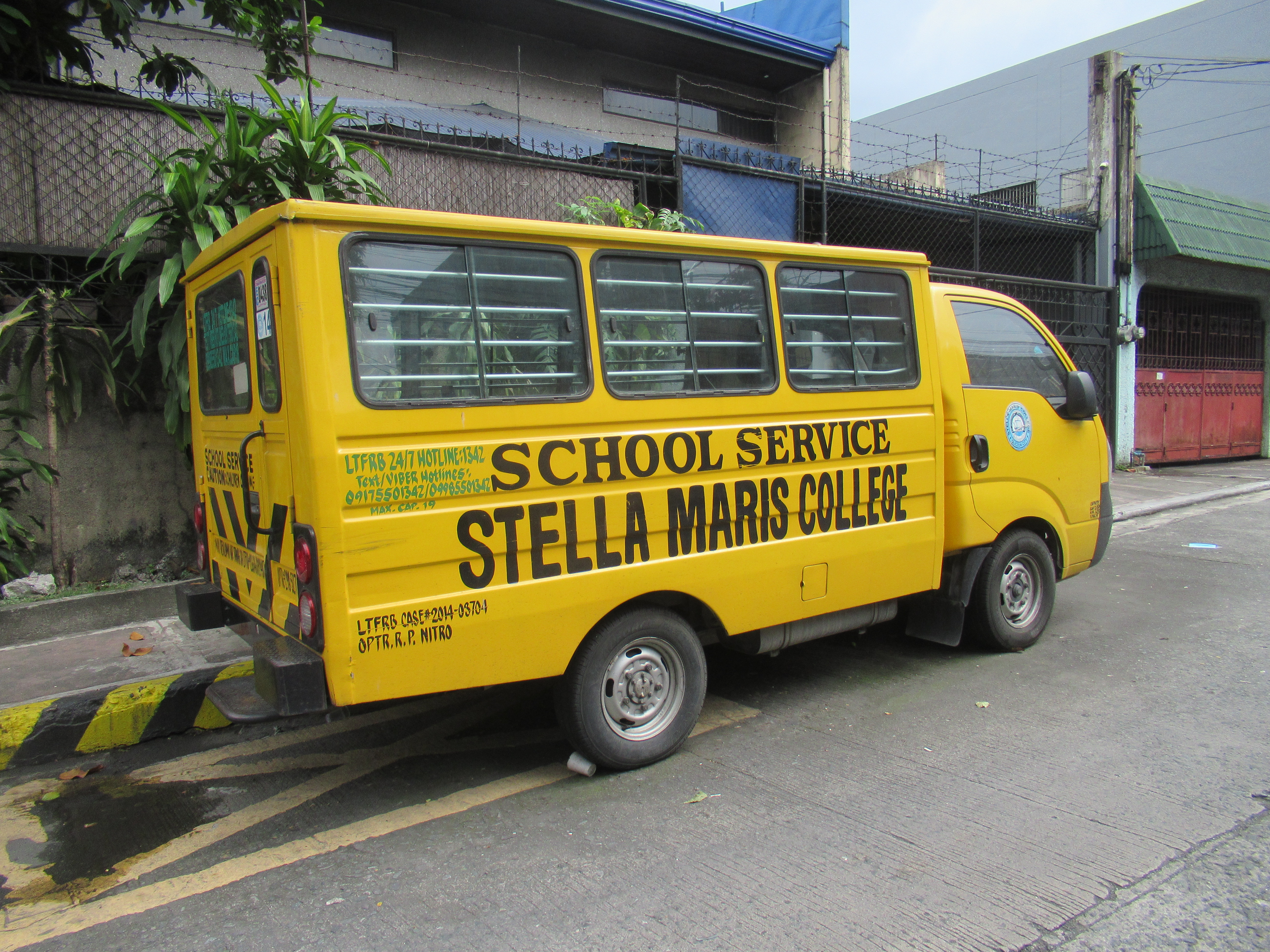
School bus
