= The Bloomfields (Filipino band) =

Filipino pop-rock band

- Origin: Quezon City, Philippines
- Genres: Rock; pop
- Years active: 2002–present
- Labels: PolyEast Records (formerly EMI); Curve Entertainment Inc
- Spinoffs: The Bloom Brothers; The Band of Brothers
- Members: Rocky Collado; Lakan Hila; Louie Poco; Nathan Abella
- Past members: Jayjay Lozano; Pepe Lozano; Dino Pascual
- Website: www.thebloomfieldsband.com

The Bloomfields is a Filipino band heavily influenced by 1960s music and is currently composed of Rocky Collado, Lakan Hila, Louie Poco, and Nathan Abella. They first gained prominence at their alma mater, La Salle Greenhills, in 2002 before breaking into the mainstream in 2005. The band is famous for their hit song "Wala Nang Iba" and their renditions of "Ale", "Love Is for Singing", "Tuloy Pa Rin Ako", and "Babaero". The band is also known for all of its members being adept at doing vocals, with Collado as the band's chief songwriter.

Founding members and brothers Jayjay Lozano and Pepe Lozano left the band some time in 2009 due to creative differences and formed their own bands called The Bloom Brothers and The Band of Brothers (later shortened to TBB). Two years after their departure, The Bloomfields and the Lozanos reconciled and have been on good terms since. The Lozanos' band TBB is now based in the United States. Another notable band member was Dino Pascual who left the group in 2021 to pursue personal endeavors.

The name "the Bloomfields" was suggested by former member Jayjay Lozano after Bloomfield Avenue located in California, United States.

== Advocacy ==
The Bloomfields supports Senyas Kamay, an organization dedicated to aiding the hearing impaired. The band's involvement in this advocacy is spearheaded by bassist Louie Poco.

== Members ==
- Rocky Collado – vocals, drums, percussion (2002–present)
- Lakan Hila – vocals, keyboards (2002–present); lead guitar (2009–present)
- Louie Poco – vocals, bass guitar (2002–present)
- Nathan Abella – vocals, rhythm guitar (2022–present)

=== Former members ===
- Jayjay Lozano – vocals, rhythm guitar, percussion, aerophones (2002–2009)
- Pepe Lozano – vocals, lead guitar (2002–2009)
- Dino Pascual – vocals, rhythm guitar, keyboards, aerophones (2009–2021)

== Discography ==
=== Albums ===
- The Bloomfields (2007)
- Pasko Natin 'To (2008)
- Hit the Ground Running (2011)
- A Drop into the Blue (2019)

== Awards and nominations ==
| Year | Award giving body | Category | Nominated work | Results |
|---|---|---|---|---|
| 2008 | Awit Awards | Best Performance by a New Group Recording Artists (Performance Award) | "Ale" | Nominated |
| 2008 | Awit Awards | Best Performance by a New Group Recording Artists (People's Choice Award) | "Ale" | Nominated |
| 2008 | MYX Music Awards | Favorite Remake | "Ale" | Nominated |
| 2008 | MYX Music Awards | Favorite New Artist | —N/a | Nominated |
