= Pasko Naming Hangad =

Studio album by Hangad
- Released: December 6, 2002
- Genre: Inspirational
- Length: 78 minutes
- Label: Jesuit Music Ministry
- Producer: Jesuit Music Ministry/Hangad

Hangad chronology
Hangad a Capella (2002)	Pasko Naming Hangad (2002)	The Easter Journey (2005)

Pasko Naming Hangad (Tagalog: Our Christmas desire) is the third album recorded by Philippine-based vocal ensemble Hangad. It is Hangad's first Christmas-themed album, containing original compositions and arrangements of some familiar Christmas songs.

Pasko Naming Hangad was launched on December 6, 2002, at the Church of the Gesu, Ateneo de Manila University, Quezon City.

== Track listing ==
English translation of Tagalog titles are provided in parentheses. Note: these translations are not official.

1. Alleluia
  - Music by Paulo K. Tirol; percussion arrangement by James Bitanga
2. Sanggol Sa Sabsaban (Child in the manger)
  - Words and music by Vincent de Jesus
3. O Come All Ye Faithful
  - Traditional; arranged by P. Tirol
4. Simeon's Canticle
  - Setting by M. Francisco, SJ (based on Luke 2:29-32); Additional text and arrangement by P. Tirol
5. Walang Iba Kundi Pag-Ibig
  - (Tag. Nothing else but love)– Words and music by V. de Jesus
  - Guest performer: Noel Cabangon (soloist)
6. Oyayi (Lullabye)
  - Words and music by Arnel Aquino, SJ
7. The Day The Child Was Born
  - Words and music by James Bitanga
8. Silent Night
  - Lyrics by Franz Gruber; Music by Franz Gruber; arranged by P. Tirol
9. Where You Are
  - Words by Julius Guevarra and Mark Lopez; music by J. Guevarra; additional string arrangement by J. Guevarra and Jay Gomez
10. Kahit Na Abril Ay Parang Pasko Pa Rin (Tag. It's Christmas in April, Too)
  - Words and music by V. de Jesus
11. Bisperas (Tag. Christmas Eve)
  - Words and music by A. Aquino, SJ; arrangement by JC Uy
12. O Holy Night
  - Original words and music by Adolphe Adam; arranged by JC Uy
13. Praise Alleluia
  - Words and music by J. Bitanga
14. Peace Prayer
  - Original words and music by David Haas (based on a Navajo prayer, with parts adapted from Jesu, Joy of Man's Desiring by J. S. Bach, and Greensleeves/What Child Is This?); arrangement by P. Tirol
15. Umaga Sa Pasko (instrumental) (Christmas Morning)
  - Music by P. Tirol; arrangement by JC Uy

== Simeon's Canticle Music Video ==
Hangad released the music video for Simeon's Canticle, featuring vignettes of people who have provided community service (for example, former Philippine Health undersecretary Jaime Galvez Tan, M.D.). The video, as in other Hangad music videos, feature Hangad itself near the end.

Although Simeon's Canticle was originally released at the Hangad debut album's CD version, the music video was produced only after Pasko Naming Hangad was published. It was shown on major television stations and still enjoys regular broadcasts on RPN (now known as CNN Philippines) and IBC.

== Credits ==
Instrumentalists

- Guest singer - Noel Cabangon
- Cello - Nino Llorin
- Violins - Jeremy Dadap (track 9)

Production

- Executive producer – Ari Dy, SJ
- Produced by Hangad, the Jesuit Music Ministry and the Jesuit Communications Foundation, Inc.
- Production team – Mariel de Jesus, Atoy Salazar and JC Uy
- Inlay design and illustration, album art direction - Kyle Baizas and Lance Lazatin

Engineering

- Mixing and mastering engineer – Ditoy Aguila
- Recording engineer – Willan Caimol and Toto Sorioso
- Recorded and mixed at SFX Digital Sound Studio

Songbook For Pasko Naming Hangad: Vocal Arrangements (2003)

- Production manager – TJ San Jose
- Score design and layout – Monchu Lucero (Luxis Graphikos)
- Editors – Cha Lagrisola, Monchu Lucero, Clare Royandoyan, TJ San Jose, JC Uy
- Encoders – James Bitanga, Julius Guevarra, Monchu Lucero, Atoy Salazar, Paulo Tirol
- Copy editors – Trin Panganiban-Custodio, Paulo Tirol, JC Uy
- Additional text – Arnel Aquino, SJ;
- Book design – Monchu Lccero (Luxis Graphikos)
- Front cover and illustrations – Kyle Baizas, Lance Lazatin

== Accolades ==
Pasko Naming Hangad was nominated for Best Album Packaging of the Year at the Awit Awards
