= Ale (song) =

- Thumbnail of the music video

Song by The Bloomfields

from the album The Bloomfields
- Language: Filipino
- Released: January 27, 2007
- Length: 3:47
- Label: EMI Philippines
- Songwriter: Bodjie Dasig
- Composer: Bodjie Dasig
- Producers: Andrew Santiago; Angee Rozul

"Ale" (Note: Full title: "Ale (Nasa Langit na Ba Ako)") (lit. '"Lady"') is a Filipino pop song originally composed and recorded by Bodjie Dasig in 1989 and later by the band the Bloomfields in 2007. The Bloomfields' version became popular again two decades after its release, driven largely by social media.

== History ==
Bodjie Dasig wrote and composed "Ale" in 1989 and initially recorded it himself. In 1992, Dasig collaborated with Richard Reynoso to record a second version of the song, which became widely known. The song was later used as the theme for the 1998 Filipino film Honey, Nasa Langit na Ba Ako?.

In 2007, the Bloomfields, a four-man Filipino band, recorded their version of "Ale".

== Resurgence ==
The song saw a resurgence in late 2025, around the same time the Bloomfields were promoting their single "Balikan", which has a similarly nostalgic sound. In mid-December 2025, a TikTok video by 20-year-old Eliza Salcedo, who goes by @elizabelle, featuring an outfit check at Cubao Expo in Quezon City along with a short dance, went viral. The video has been viewed more than 4 million times, and many people responded by posting their own videos and reactions online.

Following its viral success, "Ale" reached No. 1 on TikTok Trending Sounds, No. 2 on Spotify Philippines Viral 50, and debuted at No. 74 on the Billboard Philippines Hot 100.

== Charts ==
Chart performance for "Ale"
Chart (2025)	Peak position
Philippines Hot 100 (Billboard)	74
