= Marikina =

Highly urbanized city in Metro Manila, Philippines

- Highly urbanized city
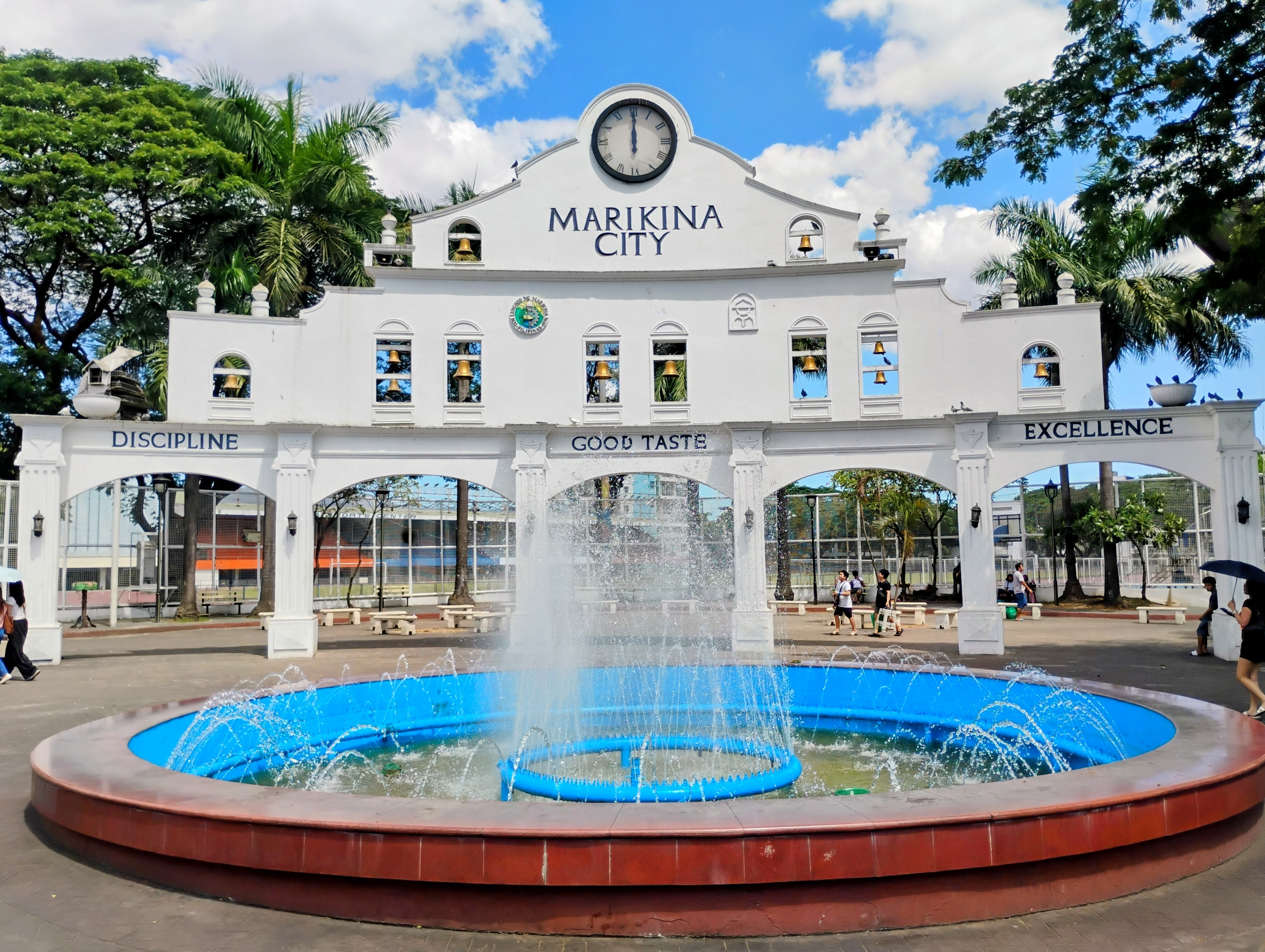
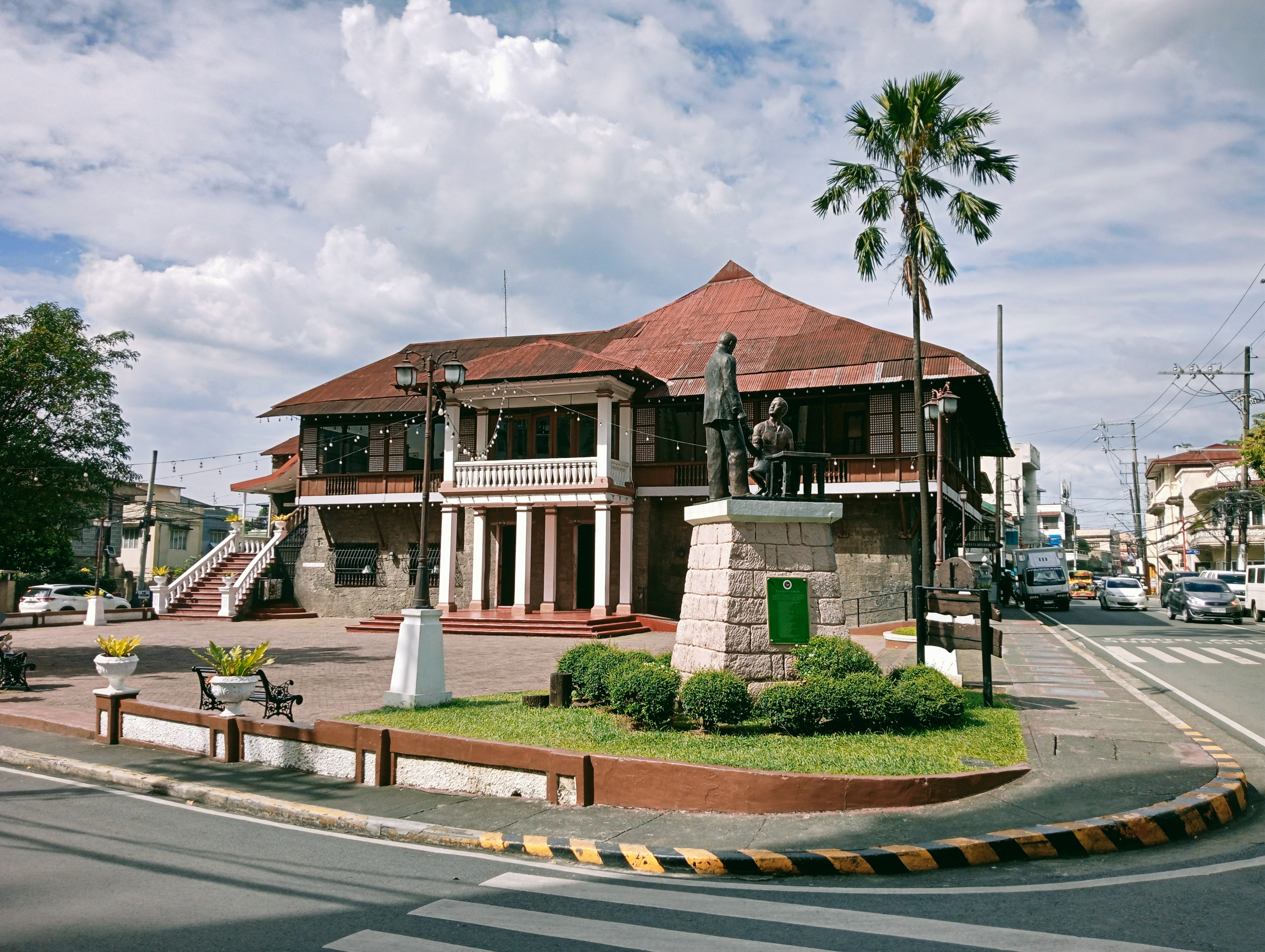
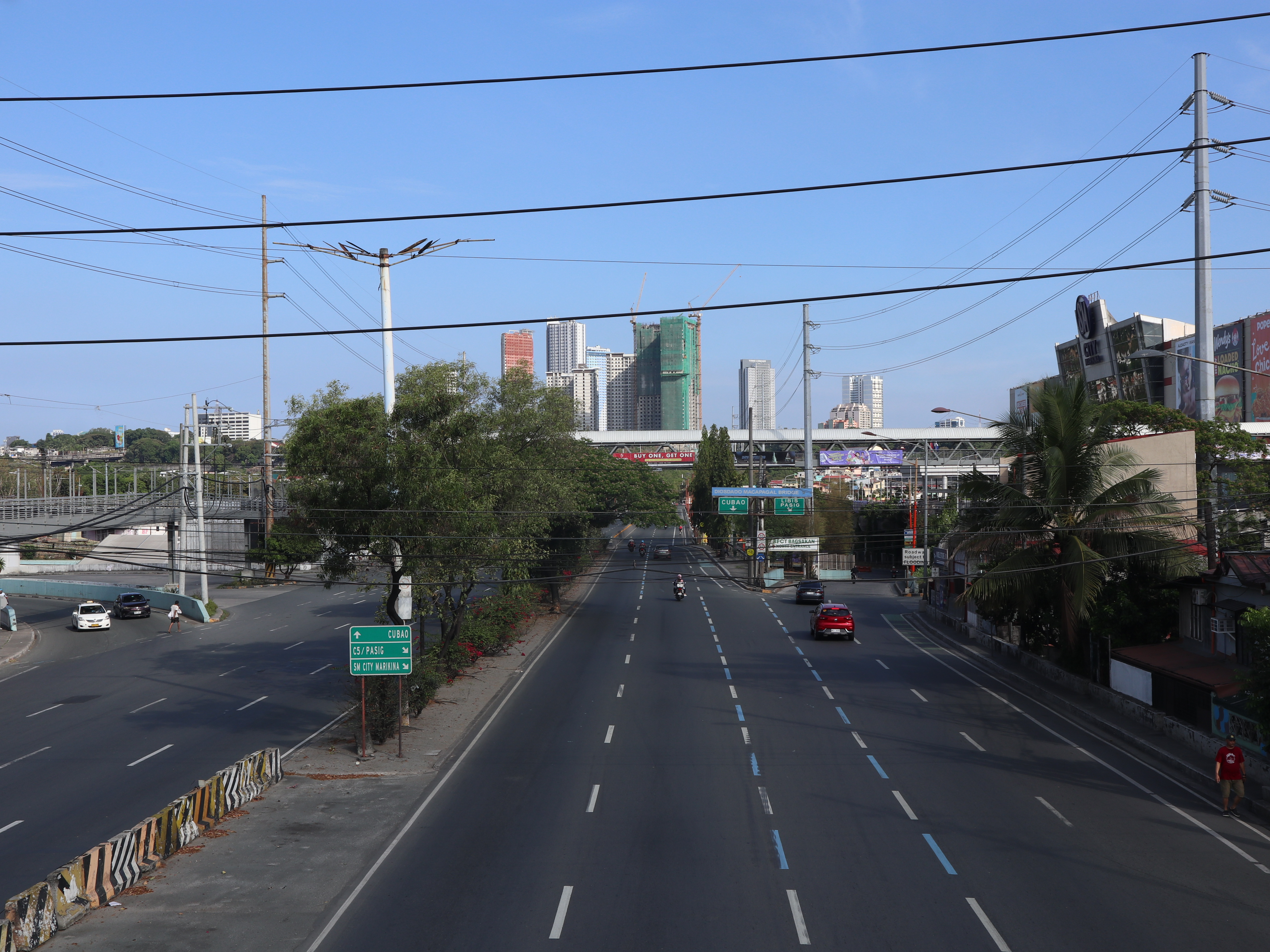
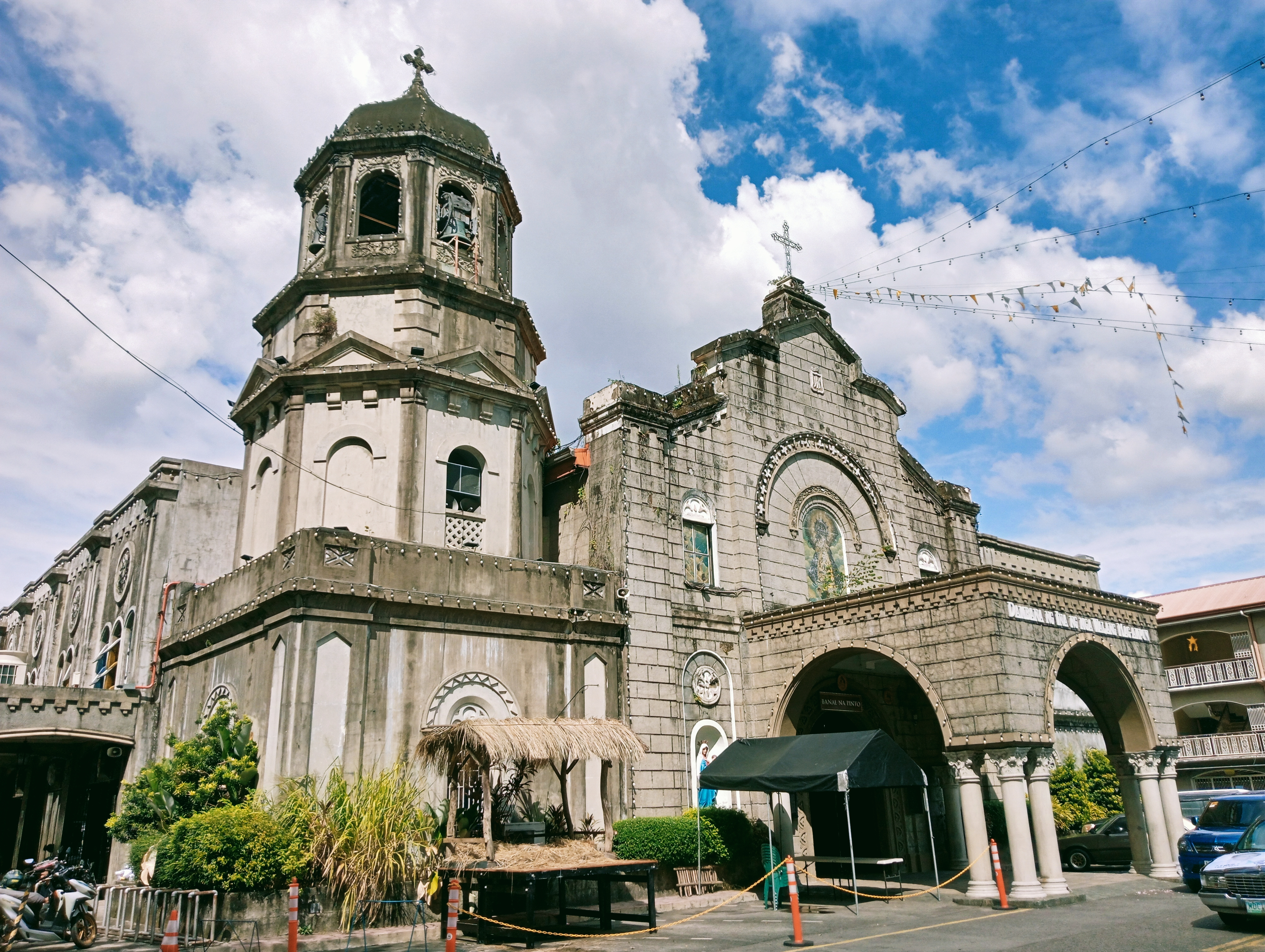
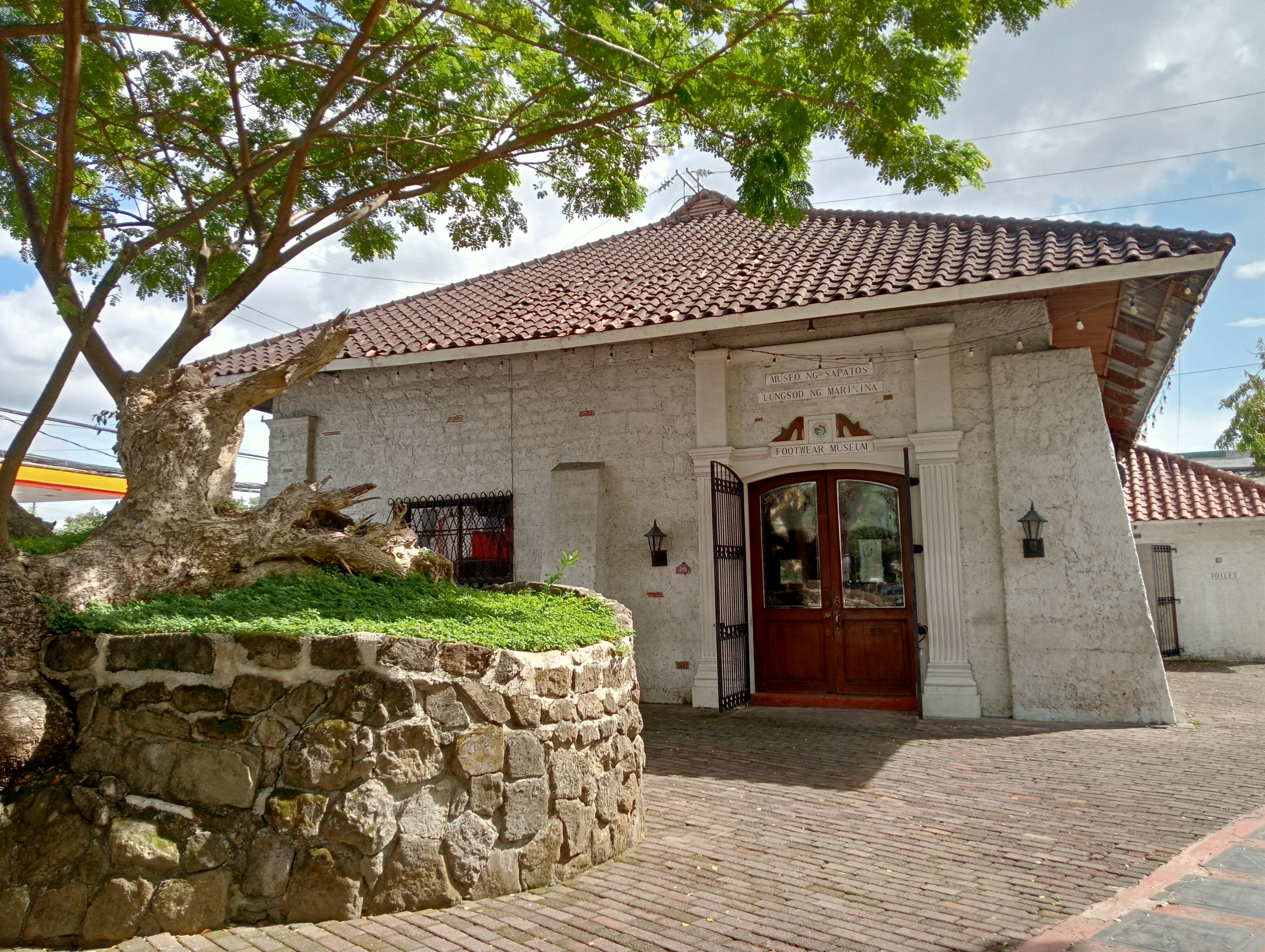
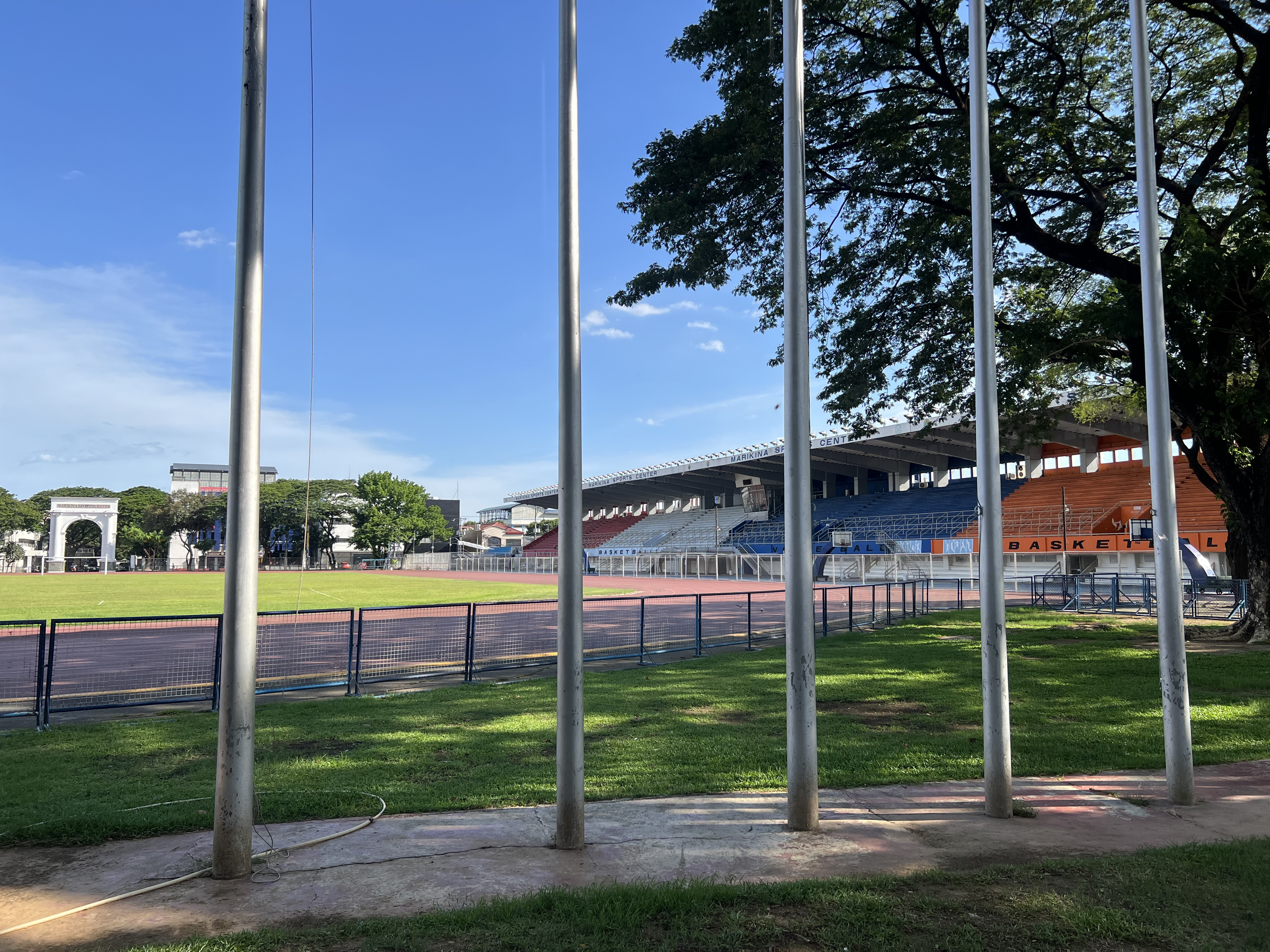
- Marikina Cityhood Park Kapitan Moy Heritage House Marikina–Infanta Highway Marikina Church Shoe Museum Riverbanks Center Marikina Sports Center

- Flag Seal
- Nickname: Shoe Capital of the Philippines
- Motto(s): "Discipline, Good Taste, Excellence"
- Anthem: Himno ng Marikina (Marikina Hymn)
- Map of Metro Manila with Marikina highlighted
- Interactive map of Marikina
- Location within the Philippines Location within Luzon
- Coordinates: 14°39′N 121°06′E
- Country: Philippines
- Region: Metro Manila
- Province: none
- District: 1st and 2nd Districts
- Founded: April 16, 1630
- Cityhood and HUC: December 8, 1996
- Barangays: 16 (see Barangays)

Government
  - Type: Sangguniang Panlungsod
  - Mayor: Maan Teodoro (NUP)
  - Vice Mayor: Del de Guzman (Lakas)
  - Representatives: Marcelino Teodoro (NUP) (1st district); Miro Quimbo (Lakas) (2nd district)
  - City Council: Members: First district; Carl Africa (Lakas); Jojo Banzon (NUP); Cloyd Casmiro (NUP); Kate de Guzman (NUP); Sam Ferriol (Independent; Ces Reyes (Lakas); Ginny Santos Pioquinto (NUP); Pat Sicat (NUP); 2nd District; Ronnie Acuña (Lakas); Ziffred Ancheta (Lakas); Marife Dayao (NUP); Jaren Feliciano (NUP); Bong Magtubo (Lakas); Angel Nuñez (NUP); Larry Punzalan (NUP); Elvis Tolentino (NUP)
  - Electorate: 315,980 voters (2025)

Area
  - Total: 21.52 km^{2} (8.31 sq mi)
- Elevation: 48 m (157 ft)

Population (2024 census)
  - Total: 471,323
  - Density: 21,900/km^{2} (56,720/sq mi)
  - Households: 104,415
- Demonym(s): Marikeño; Marikenyo; Marikeña; Marikenya

Economy
  - Income class: 1st city income class
  - Poverty incidence: 0.9% (2023)
  - HDI: ▲0.862 (Very High)
  - Revenue: ₱ 3,673 million (2024)
  - Assets: ₱ 10,529 million (2024)
  - Expenditure: ₱ 3,845 million (2024)
  - Liabilities: ₱ 5,382 million (2024)

Service provider
  - Electricity: Manila Electric Company (Meralco)
  - Water: Manila Water
- Time zone: UTC+8 (PST)
- PSGC: 1380700000
- IDD : area code: +63 (0)02
- Native languages: Filipino
- Major religions: Roman Catholic
- Catholic Diocese: Roman Catholic Diocese of Antipolo
- Patron Saint: Our Lady of the Abandoned
- Website: www.marikina.gov.ph

Marikina (/mərɪˈkɪnə/), officially the City of Marikina (Filipino: Lungsod ng Marikina), is a highly urbanized city in the National Capital Region of the Philippines. According to the 2024 census, it has a population of 471,323 people.

Located along the eastern border of Metro Manila, Marikina is the main gateway of Metro Manila to Rizal and Quezon through the Marikina–Infanta Highway. It is bordered on the west by Quezon City, to the south by Pasig and Cainta, to the north by San Mateo, and to the east by Antipolo, the capital of Rizal province.

The city was founded by the Jesuits on the fertile Marikina Valley in 1630 and the area was called Jesus dela Peña (Jesus of the Rocks) and later on called Mariquina. Marikina was the provincial capital of the Province of Manila under the First Philippine Republic from 1898 to 1899 during the Philippine Revolution. Following the onset of American occupation it was then organized as a municipality of Rizal Province, prior to the formation of Metro Manila in 1975. Formerly a rural settlement, Marikina is now primarily residential and industrial and has become increasingly commercial in recent years. Marikina has one of Metro Manila's lowest poverty incidence rates at 0.9% and the highest human development index, with a score of 0.862 (very high).

Marikina is known as the "Shoe Capital of the Philippines" owing to its famous shoe industry. It is the biggest manufacturer of shoes in the Philippines, producing almost 70% of shoes made in the country. Located in the city are the Philippine International Footwear Center and the Shoe Museum, housing the infamous shoe collection of former First Lady Imelda Marcos, wife of the late Filipino president, Ferdinand Marcos.

The city is under the jurisdiction of the Roman Catholic Diocese of Antipolo. It contains the Our Lady of the Abandoned Church, the oldest in the Marikina Valley, built in 1572.

== Etymology ==
In view of the non-existence of records or documents on how the name Marikina came into being, the following legends were gathered from elder residents of the different barrios in Marikina.

- One of the builders of the Jesús de la Peña Chapel was a young priest named "Mariquina", who was given the task of baptizing children to Christianity. Because of this very noble job, Mariquina was named in his honor.
- It is said that before the Spaniards came to Mariquina, a beautiful, virtuous, polite, and intelligent lady named Maria Cuina was residing in the town. Because of her expertise in business, she became wealthy, and her fortunes were expended on charity. She eventually became famous in the whole town up to Manila.
- Construction of the chapel of Jesús de la Peña was supervised by a Jesuit priest, and the laborers were Filipinos. As expected, the language barrier resulted in the usual misunderstandings. When the chapel was completed and the priest asked what the structure would be called, one worker answered "Marikit-na-Po", thinking that what was being asked was the condition of the chapel.
- In the province of Viscaya in Spain, there was a beautiful town called Mariquina. The town, located beside the Charmaga River (now known as Artibai River), is the origin of the Jesuit priests who came to the Philippines and established Jesús de la Peña. Because of this, "Mariquina" was used to honor the place where they came from. In 1901, Commissioner de Tavera changed the letter "q" to "k".
- Based on history and documents in the custody of the municipal government of Marikina, the town was called Marikit-na in 1787 and was later changed to Mariquina. According to Trinidad Pardo de Tavera, the word Mariquina was in recognition of Captain Félix Berenguer de Marquina, who led the town in 1788.

== History ==
=== Spanish colonial era ===
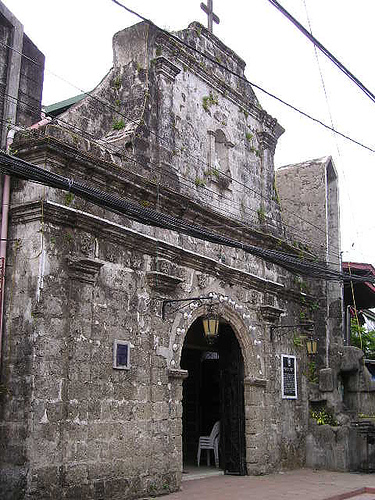
Jesús de la Pena Chapel

The Augustinians first to arrived at the valley in the late 16th century, at the spot known as Chorillo in Barangka. In 1572, Our Lady of the Abandoned Parish was established. Next came the Jesuits in 1630, in a place now called Jesús de la Peña (Jesus of the Rocks). Here, the Jesuits established a mission and built a chapel still known today as Jesús de la Pena Chapel. Fray Pedro de Arce, apostolic ruler of the Archbishop of Manila at that time, approved transfer of ecclesiastical control and supervision to the Jesuits, and settled the place as a town.

In 1665, an intensity 8 earthquake struck the valley and nearby Manila, and it is related to the activity now known as Marikina Valley Fault System. Only a Jesuit church experienced great damage and resulting in 19 deaths in the said earthquake.

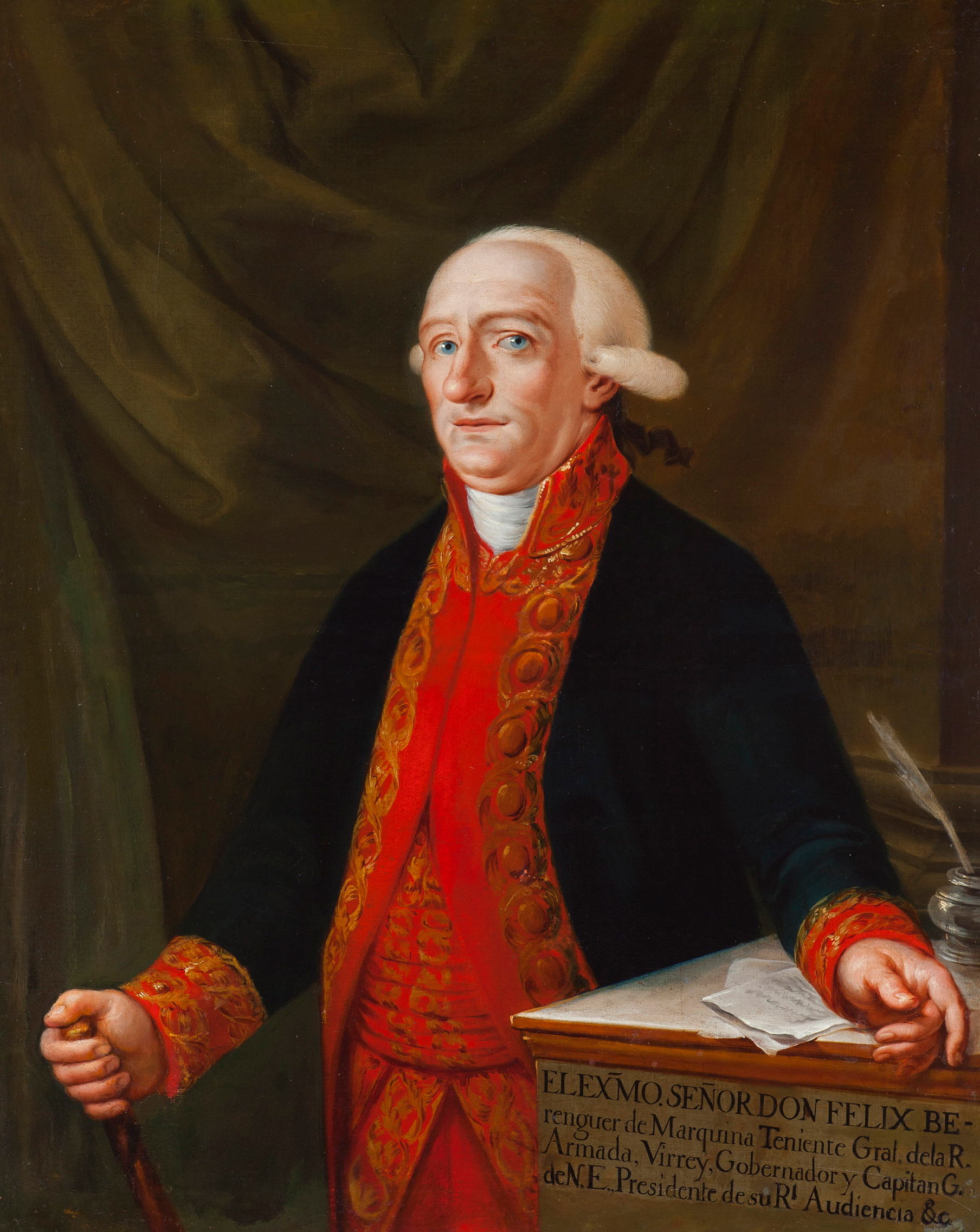
Félix Berenguer de Marquina

In 1787, the town was called "Mariquina" after Felix Berenguer de Marquina, who was the governor-general at that time, and the town was declared a pueblo under the Spanish colonial government.

Marikina was once the Hacienda Sauza-Berenguer de Marquina, the land and home was formerly owned by Don Santiago Sauza y Delos Rios and his wife Dona Ysabel Berenguer de Marquina y Sumulong. By the 19th century, Hacienda Mariquina was eventually owned and administered by the Tuason family and had become the largest in the Philippines. The hacienda was declared a mayorazgo by the Spanish colonial government. Don Juan Gregorio became the first Alcalde Capitan of Mariquina in 1822.

During the Philippine Revolution in 1896, Andrés Bonifacio arrived in Mariquina before he and his Katipuneros proceeded to the caves of Montalban. Mariquina became the capital of the Province of Manila in 1898, when the Philippine Revolution broke out, a period when Philippine Independence was declared by Emilio Aguinaldo, the first Philippine president. Don Vicente Gomez became the first Alcalde Presidente of Mariquina in 1900.

=== American colonial era ===
On June 11, 1901, shortly after the United States took possession of the Philippines, its name officially became "Marikina". The province of Rizal was created by Act No. 137 by the First Philippine Commission which was acting as the unicameral legislative body in the island of Luzon. Marikina and many other towns around Manila were incorporated into the new province.

In 1906, the Manila Railroad Company completed a 31 km (19 mi) steam train line called "Montalban Line", also known as Marikina Line and Rosario-Montalban branch, a branch of Philippine National Railway in which the train company is currently existing in some parts of Luzon (today, it converted into a road which is known today as Daang Bakal, including Shoe Avenue and other streets following the former old rail tracks of the line). The company also constructed four stations in Marikina including the only surviving station of that structure today, the Mariquina station located near D. Victorino Street, the rest were demolished to give way for roads, houses, or establishments. These stations are connected between Montalban (known today as Rodriguez, in Rizal Province) to the north and Rosario (known today as Tramo, in Pasig) to the south. Marikina Bridge, a vital economic link to Manila, was formally opened in 1934. Marikina Airfield was completed and used as a civilian airfield during the train line construction. The runway were subsequently converted into the road known today as E. Santos Street, and the airfield stands today as Paliparan Subdivision. In 1936, the Montalban Line was abandoned.

In 1939, the barrios of Balara, Barranca (Barangka), Jesus de la Peña, Krus na Ligas, Tañong, and the site of the new UP Campus were separated from Marikina to form part of the newly established Quezon City. In 1941, the barrios of lower Barranca and Jesus de la Peña were returned to Marikina.

=== Japanese occupation ===
In 1942, during the World War II, Japanese Imperial forces occupied Marikina. The town was liberated in 1945 by combined United States and Philippine Commonwealth ground troops, who attacked the Japanese Imperial Army by artillery from Quezon City. Almost all of the large buildings, including the church bell tower, were destroyed. In reality, the Japanese had already left the town and retreated to the north. The town saw over 400 civilians casualties by the end of World War II. Local Filipino troops under the pre-war 4th and 42nd Infantry Division of the Philippine Commonwealth Army entered Marikina and assisted U.S. forces in attacking Japanese troops during the liberation. The general headquarters of the Philippine Commonwealth Army was rebuilt and stationed in Marikina after the war.

=== Post-war era ===
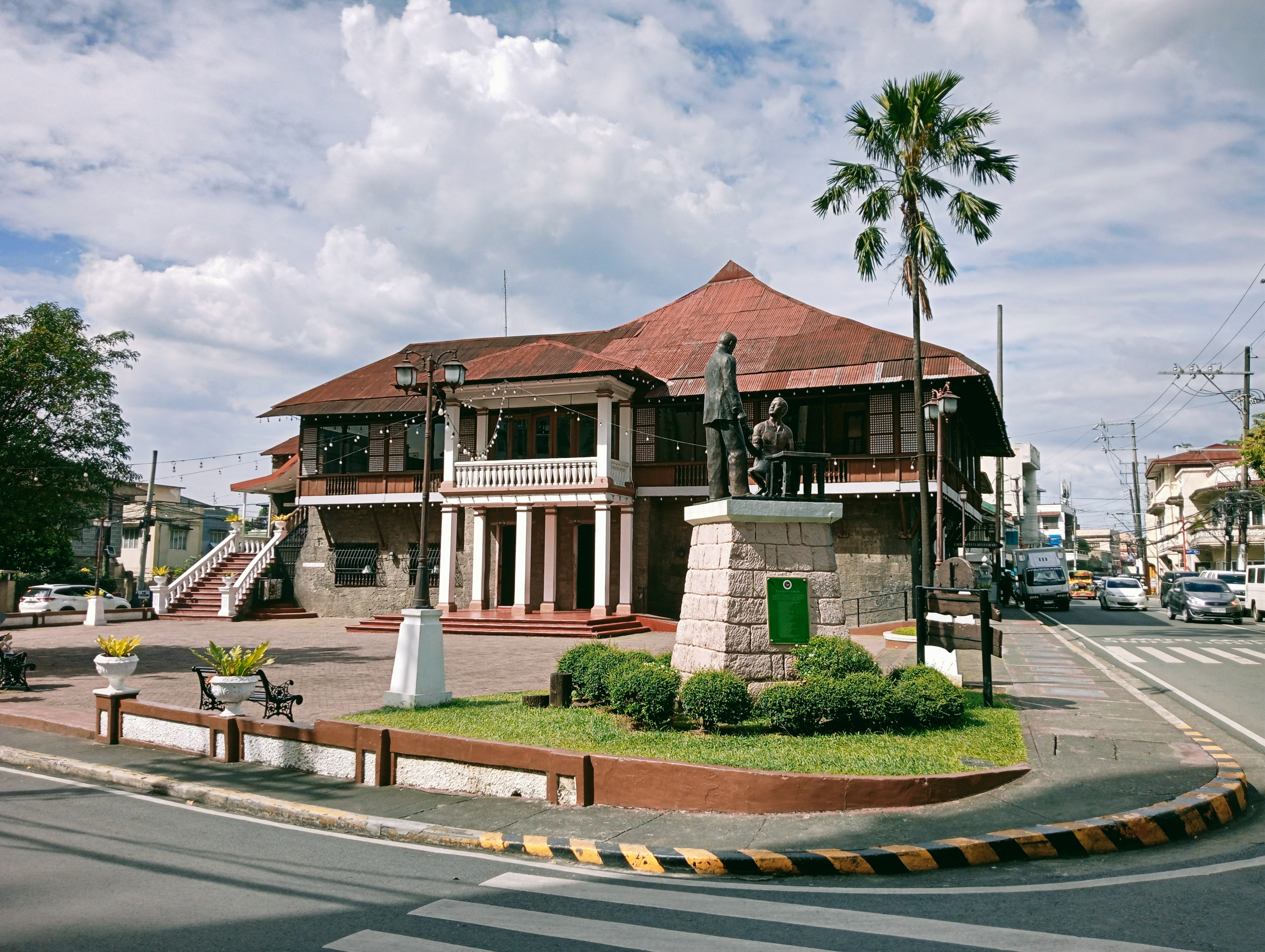
Kapitan Moy Residence

In 1956, Marikina was given the title of "Shoe Capital of the Philippines" and has re-emerged as a town of shoemakers after World War II. Honed by years of shoe manufacturing experience, the natives had developed a work ethic that prepared them for the arrival of heavy industries. With the industrial plants came waves of workers who chose to stay, rapidly increasing the population.

In November 1959, Osmundo de Guzman was elected mayor of Marikina.

In 1968, Kapitan Moy's house (now known as Sentrong Pangkultura ng Marikina or Cultural Center of Marikina in English) was declared a national shrine by the town council and the National Historical Commission.

In 1969, Rodriguez Sports Complex, known today as Marikina Sports Center, was completed.

=== Martial law era ===
The beginning months of the 1970s marked a period of turmoil in the Philippines, and in Marikina specifically. During his bid to be the first Philippine president to be re-elected for a second term, Ferdinand Marcos launched an unprecedented number of foreign debt-funded public works projects. This caused the Philippine economy took a sudden downwards turn known as the 1969 Philippine balance of payments crisis, which in turn led to a period of economic difficulty and a significant rise of social unrest. Many young people in the poorer barangays of Marikina, particularly Barangka, joined protest activities and activist organizations.

With only a year left in his last constitutionally allowed term as president Ferdinand Marcos placed the Philippines under Martial Law in September 1972 and thus retained the position for fourteen more years. This period in Philippine history is remembered for the Marcos administration's record of human rights abuses, particularly targeting political opponents, student activists, journalists, religious workers, farmers, and others who fought against the Marcos dictatorship. Victims were often tortured and killed and came to be known as "salvage" victims. The bridges across the Marikina river became a frequent area for such bodies to be discarded, with a notable example being that of University of the Philippines Literature Professor Valerio "Lerry" Nofuente, who was killed and left dead in his Volkswagen vehicle at the foot of one of the rivers, having just visited friends who were workers of Fortune Tobacco in Barangay Fortune.

On November 7, 1975, by virtue of Presidential Decree No. 824, four cities and twelve towns of Rizal, including Marikina, along with the town of Valenzuela in Bulacan, were made part of Metropolitan Manila Area.

=== Late 20th century ===
Since as early as 1937, Marikina had suffered flooding, which was caused by the swelling of the Marikina River. In late October 1988, the municipality was among the hardest-hit by Typhoon Ruby (Unsang); heavy rains caused the river rising to 19 meters, and with high water level of Laguna Lake as well, these led to massive, then-record flooding that stranded several residents and seriously damaged the Marikina Valley, among others, particularly in Provident Subdivision in Santo Niño where water reportedly reached 2.4 meters (8 ft) high.

By 1992, Marikina had become an industrialized urban municipality under the leadership of Bayani Fernando. Marikina River was transformed into a waterway, with the Marikina River Park along the riverbanks.

=== Cityhood ===
Then district representative Romeo Candazo authored the cityhood bill filed in the Congress which, on November 6, 1996, was signed into law by President Fidel V. Ramos as Republic Act (RA) No. 8223. A plebiscite was held on December 7 in 577 polling precincts.

Low voter turnout was observed as the plebiscite was marred by reports of disenfranchised voters, as well as disinformation campaign which prevented residents to vote, with five individuals apprehended; barangays of Concepcion, Daang Bakal area, and parts of Barangay Malanday and then-sitio Tumana, Candazo's bailiwicks, held boycotts. Candazo later denied allegations that he campaigned for a boycott and his camp waged the disinformation.

Meanwhile, a delay of counting of ballots due to lack of Commission on Elections personnel led to some 200 teachers abandoning their posts, taking with them canvassing sheets and less than 16,000 unvalidated ballots. The counting proceeded with some employees of the local government treasury assisted in validation of votes. Despite the turnout yet the majority ratified the cityhood, the following day, the COMELEC eventually declared the municipality as a highly urbanized city, citing that the unvalidated ballots does not affect those counted already. Marikina became the ninth city in Metro Manila.

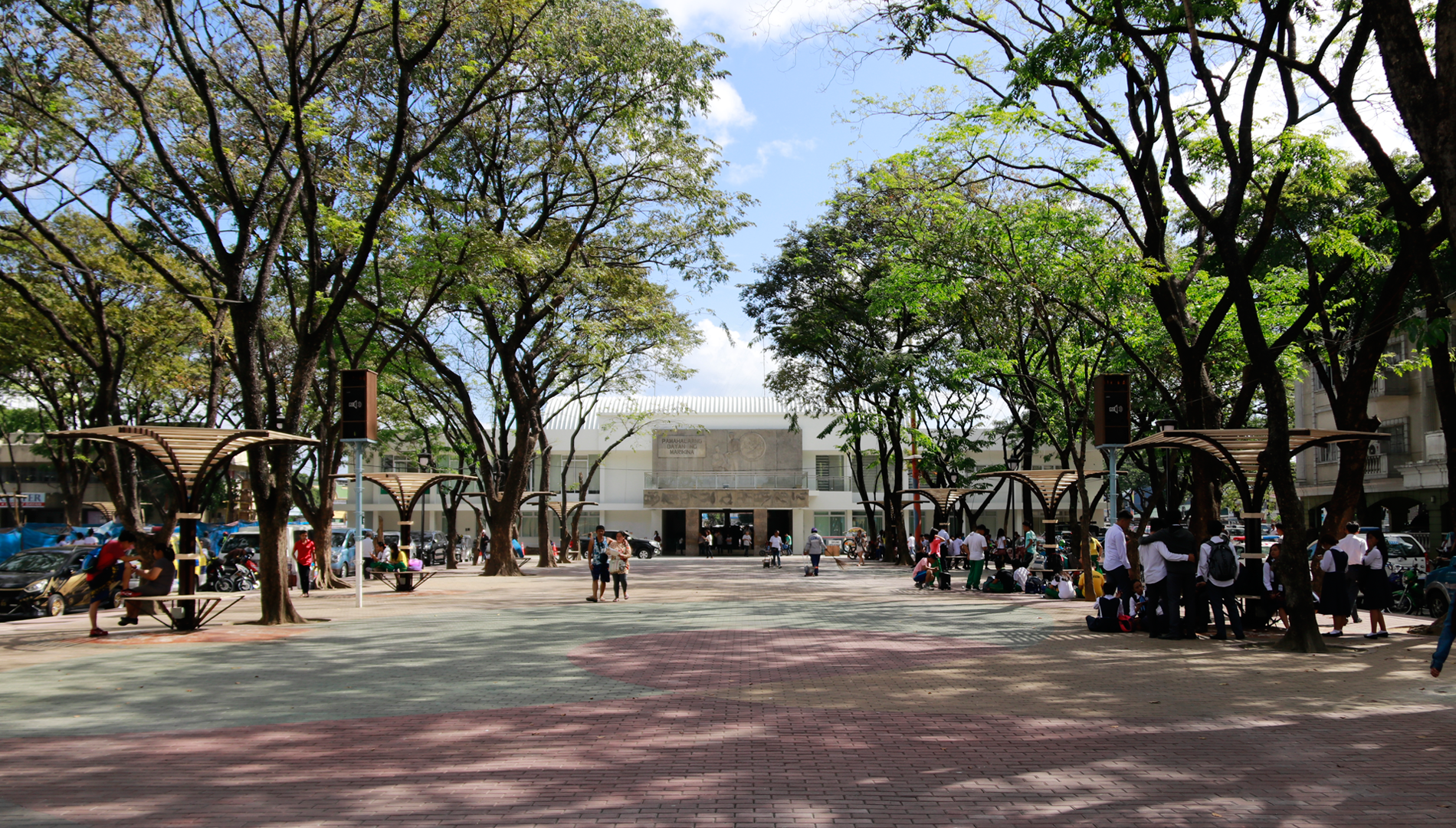
Freedom Park

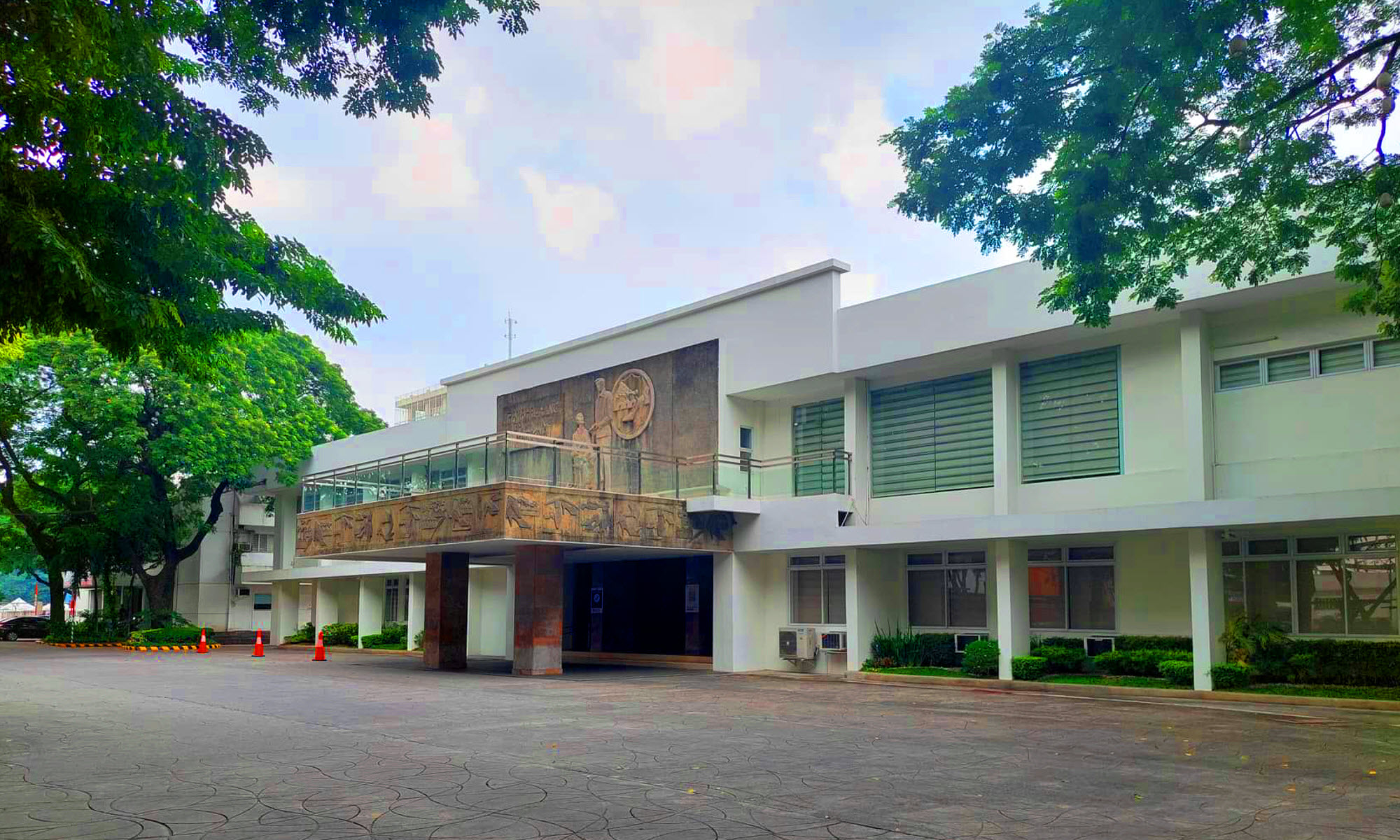
Marikina Old Municipal Building

Marikina cityhood plebiscite
Choice	Votes	%
For	18,649	89.86
Against	2,105	10.14
Total	20,754	100.00
Valid votes	20,754	100.00
Invalid/blank votes	0	0.00
Total votes	20,754	100.00
Registered voters/turnout	223,229	9.30

=== Contemporary ===
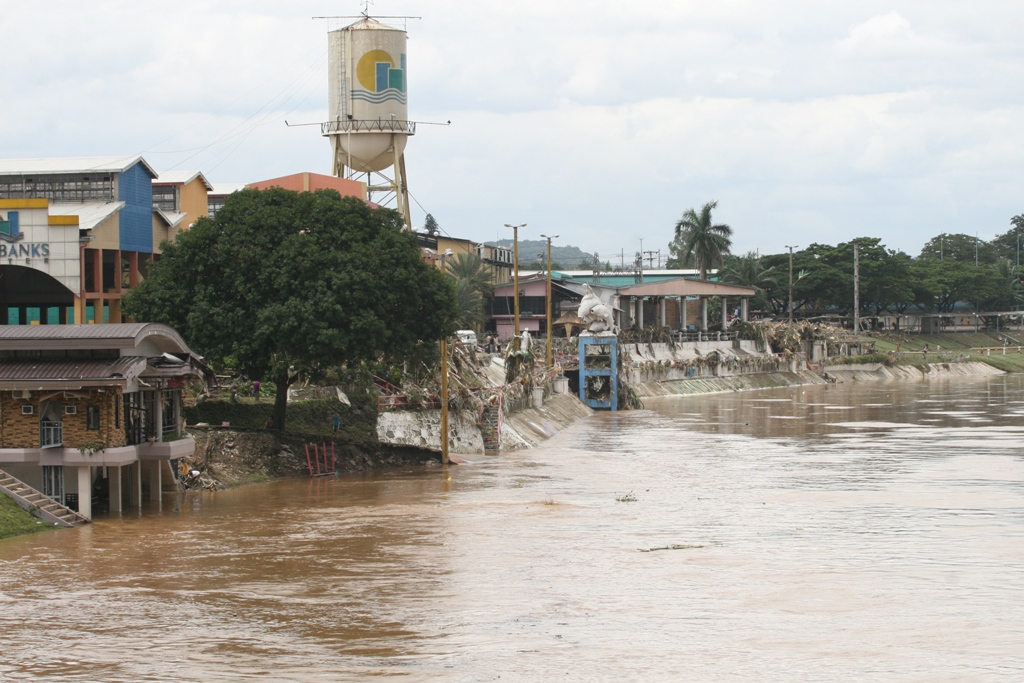
Flooding at Riverbanks Center due to TS Ondoy in 2009

In 2006, under RA No. 9364 signed by President Gloria Macapagal Arroyo, Marikina was divided into two congressional districts, being served by two representatives since 2007. Fortune and Tumana, two sitios in barangays Parang and Concepcion Uno respectively, were converted into independent barangays, the city's newest (15th and 16th), in 2007.

On September 26, 2009, Marikina was severely affected by Tropical Storm Ketsana (Ondoy), which submerged majority of Metro Manila, with Marikina River reaching a record high, more than 21 meters, (Note: There were different reports on Marikina River's peak water level (above sea level) during Tropical Storm Ondoy in 2009: 21.5 meters, according to the city government in 2020; 22.16 meters, as recorded by the Japan International Cooperation Agency; 22.8 meters, as mentioned in a study; 23 meters, as stated by then city mayor Maria Lourdes Fernando, and as per various reports at the time.; In 2020, during Typhoon Ulysses, the river's water level reached as high as 22 meters. City mayor Marcelino Teodoro said it surpassed the one during Ondoy (21.5 m); at least a news outlet said it was "a meter less than" that during Ondoy. Normal water level at the river: 14 meters) and half of its barangays flooded, particularly in Tumana (also the hardest-hit by the 2012 rains); resulted to 70 deaths and more than ₱27 million worth of damage. Almost the same scenario occurred in the city upon being hit by Tropical Storm Meari (Falcon) in June and Typhoon Nesat (Pedring) in November 2011; the monsoon rains (habagat) of August 2012; Tropical Depression Josie in July and Tropical Storm Karding in August of 2018. On November 12, 2020, the river water level rose to another record high at 22 meters during Typhoon Vamco (Ulysses), which killed 25 people.

In 2016, first district congressman Marcelino Teodoro, a former councilor and publisher, won the mayoral election against incumbent Liberal mayor Del de Guzman. In May 2017, he joined the PDP-Laban party, taking his oath before Senate President Koko Pimentel. Teodoro's mayorship has been cited for its effective leadership and enhanced governmental services which kept Marikina's informal status as a "model city", with Teodoro himself acknowledging that his policy is to retain or build on the legacy programs of Bayani Fernando and other predecessors. In November 2019, after Metro Manila was chosen to be the pilot area for the Duterte administration's Safe Philippines surveillance project, Teodoro signed a memorandum of agreement with Interior Secretary Eduardo Año that made Marikina the first LGU to launch the program, which planned the installation of 200 Huawei-made surveillance cameras around the city to help prevent crime; the nationwide project was later scrapped in May 2022. By late 2020, a feud emerged between mayor Teodoro and then-congressman Fernando when Teodoro alleged Fernando's Marikina River reclamation project to have contributed to floods during Typhoon Ulysses (internationally known as Typhoon Vamco). Due to the feud, Fernando attempted to run for mayor against Teodoro in the 2022 elections, but was eventually defeated.

On March 25, 2025, mayor Teodoro was preventively suspended for six months by the Ombudsman alongside vice mayor Marion Andres, 13 councilors and other government officials due to the agency's ongoing investigation into the alleged misallocation of PhilHealth funds in Marikina. The allegation is based on a complaint filed by public servant and college professor Sofronio Dulay in August 2024. A day later, on March 26, twin councilors Rommel Acuña of the 1st district and Ronnie Acuña of the 2nd district were sworn in as acting mayor and vice mayor respectively, with both brothers currently allied with 2nd district congresswoman Stella Quimbo, a mayoral candidate in the 2025 elections.

== Geography ==
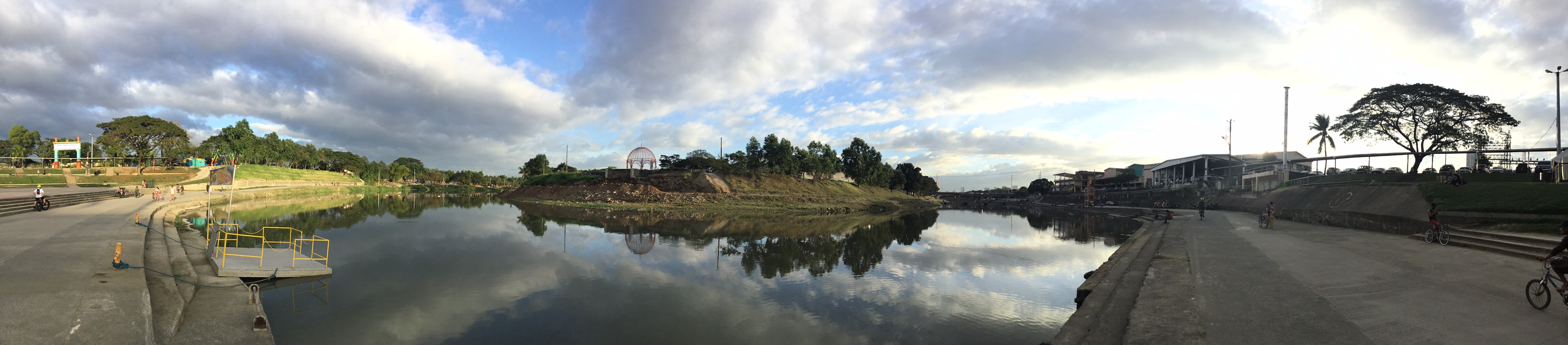
Panorama of Marikina River in Riverbanks Center

Marikina lies on the so-called Marikina Valley, which extends to the south toward Pasig and Cainta, Rizal. Sierra Madre mountains lie to the east and Quezon City hills to the west. Marikina River runs through the mid-west portion of the city, with its tributary including Nangka River. Nangka River runs through the north slicing between Marikina and San Mateo, while the small waterway called Sapang Baho Creek slicing the southeast between Marikina and Cainta and Antipolo.

The total land area of Marikina is approximately 21.5 km^{2} (2,150 ha; 5,300 acres). This represents about 3.42% of the total land area of Metro Manila. At present, the city is composed of 16 barangays. Barangays Fortune, Concepcion Uno, and Marikina Heights are among the largest in terms of land area.

The south portion of the city comprises numerous commercial, industrial and residential areas, heritage sites and mixed use zones, while the north and northeast portion are primarily residential and industrial zones, and various establishments such as small and medium enterprises. Loyola Grand Villas and Trevi Executive Village, located at the northwest portion of the city, are gated communities with upper-middle class and wealthy residents. Barangay Santa Elena represents a poblacion, or the center of Marikina. At present, it is 38% residential, 19% commercial and industrial, 17% Roads, 8% Mixed-use, 18% for parks and open spaces, development areas, institutional, cemeteries and others.

Located along the eastern border of Metro Manila, it is bordered on the west by Quezon City, to the south by Pasig and Cainta, Rizal, to the north by San Mateo, Rizal and to the east by Antipolo, the capital of Rizal province. It is approximately 21 kilometers (13 mi) away from Manila and lies within 14°38′24″N 121°5′50″E.

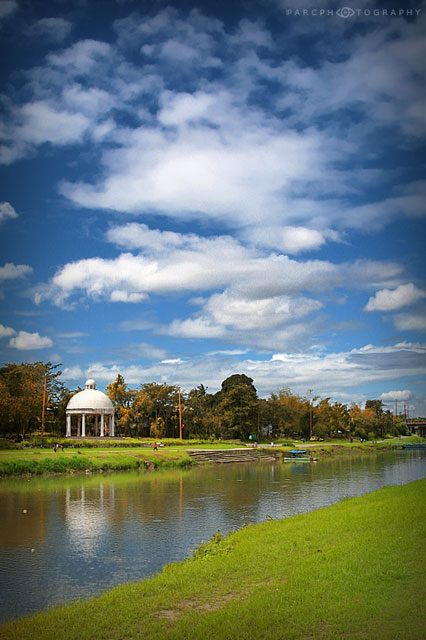
Marikina River

From the north, Marikina occupies the south bank of the Nangka River, parts of Barangay Nangka and Barangay Fortune. The east slices at the foot of the Sierra Madre mountains of Antipolo where the Meteor Homes Subdivision and Empress Subdivision are located. It continues south and occupies La Milagrosa Village in Barangay Marikina Heights and Rancho Estates 2 and 3 in Barangay Concepcion Dos. The southeast slices by Quiling Malaki Creek (where the Sapang Baho River originated) and occupies the north bank where the Barangay Conception Dos is located. It continues south and meets Balanti Creek which occupies the west bank, parts of Barangay Santo Niño and Barangay Santa Elena. From the southeastmost, it occupies Marikina Midtown Subdivision in Barangay San Roque. The south portion is sliced by Marikina-Infanta Highway occupies the north side of the highway and LRT-2 Marikina–Pasig station, and extends to the west until it occupies the LRT-2 Santolan station and reaches the Marikina River in Barangay Calumpang, near BFCT East Metro Terminal. The east occupies the southernmost of Quezon City hills which lies Barangay Industrial Valley and sliced by C5 Road occupies the west side until it reaches the Ateneo de Manila University campus. The east side of the campus covers the city, lies in Barangay Barangka, extending to the north and sliced by several roads of Loyola Grand Villas and Barangay Tumana, which covers the east part of the village until it reaches Marikina River and its tributary Nangka River in the northernmost point.

Aerial view of Marikina River

Marikina River runs to the western part of the city and is surrounded by many lush trees in the Marikina River Park on the riverbanks. The south portion of the river is surrounded by structures and concrete walkways. The river covers an area of around 220 hectares (540 acres) and measures about 11 kilometers (6.8 mi) in length and is the principal drainage system for Marikina. Its depth measures from 12 meters up to 18 meters during the heavy downpour. Rehabilitation of the River started in 1992. The river traverses 11 city barangays which have streets and alleys going to the river, making river parks easily accessible. River parks today are popular sports and recreational centers not only in Metro Manila but throughout the Philippines.

Marikina is also prone to various natural disasters, including the major floodings during the onslaught of Typhoon Unsang in 1988, Typhoon Ondoy in 2009, Tropical Storm Falcon and Typhoon Pedring in 2011, seasonal southwest monsoon in 2012 and 2016, and Typhoon Ulysses in 2020. Primarily, flooding within Marikina is caused by the increase of water level in major rivers and its tributaries from the Sierra Madre mountains, followed by overflowing from its riverbanks to low-lying areas throughout the city.

Another major threat is fault lines in Marikina caused by earthquakes. West Valley Fault Line, previously known as Marikina Fault Line, lies at the west Marikina.

Physiography zones in Marikina

City Center zone (Poblacion)

- Calumpang
- San Roque
- Santa Elena
- Santo Niño

Newtown zone (Ibayo)

- Barangka
- Industrial Valley Complex
- Jesús de la Peña
- Tañong

Riverside zone (Tabing-Ilog)

- Concepcion Uno
- Malanday
- Nangka
- Tumana

Foothills zone (Bundok)

- Concepcion Dos
- Fortune
- Marikina Heights
- Parang

=== Climate ===
Marikina features a tropical monsoon climate. Its proximity to the equator means that the temperature range is very small, rarely going lower than 18 °C (64 °F) or higher than 38 °C (100 °F). However, humidity levels are usually very high, which makes it feel much warmer. It has a distinct, relatively short dry season from January through May, and a relatively lengthy wet season, from June through December.

Climate data for Marikina, Philippines
Month	Jan	Feb	Mar	Apr	May	Jun	Jul	Aug	Sep	Oct	Nov	Dec	Year
Mean daily maximum °C (°F)	29 (84)	29 (84)	31 (88)	33 (91)	34 (93)	34 (93)	33 (91)	31 (88)	31 (88)	31 (88)	31 (88)	31 (88)	32 (90)
Mean daily minimum °C (°F)	20 (68)	20 (68)	21 (70)	22 (72)	23 (73)	24 (75)	24 (75)	24 (75)	24 (75)	24 (75)	23 (73)	21 (70)	22 (72)
Average precipitation mm (inches)	25.4 (1.00)	25.4 (1.00)	38.1 (1.50)	25.4 (1.00)	38.1 (1.50)	127 (5.0)	254 (10.0)	431.8 (17.00)	406.4 (16.00)	355.6 (14.00)	203.2 (8.00)	152.4 (6.00)	2,082.8 (82.00)
Source: Pagasa DOST

== Demographics ==
Population census of Marikina
Year	Pop.	±% p.a.
1903	8,187	—
1918	9,542	+1.03%
1939	15,166	+2.23%
1948	23,353	+4.91%
1960	40,455	+4.68%
1970	113,400	+10.84%
1975	168,453	+8.26%
1980	211,613	+4.67%
1990	310,227	+3.90%
1995	357,231	+2.68%
2000	391,170	+1.96%
2007	424,610	+1.14%
2010	424,150	−0.04%
2015	450,741	+1.16%
2020	456,059	+0.25%
2024	471,323	+0.79%
Source: Philippine Statistics Authority

According to the 2024 Census, the population of the city was 471,323. The population of Marikina is near half a million, making it one of the most densely populated areas in the Philippines. Like other places in Metro Manila, the original settlers of Marikina were Tagalog. There has been a constant migration of other ethnic groups in the Philippines.

=== Demonym ===
The native people in Marikina refer to themselves as "Marikeño" (or Marikenyo, in Filipino).

=== Language ===
Tagalog is widely spoken and the main language in Marikina, while English is used in education and business.

=== Religion ===
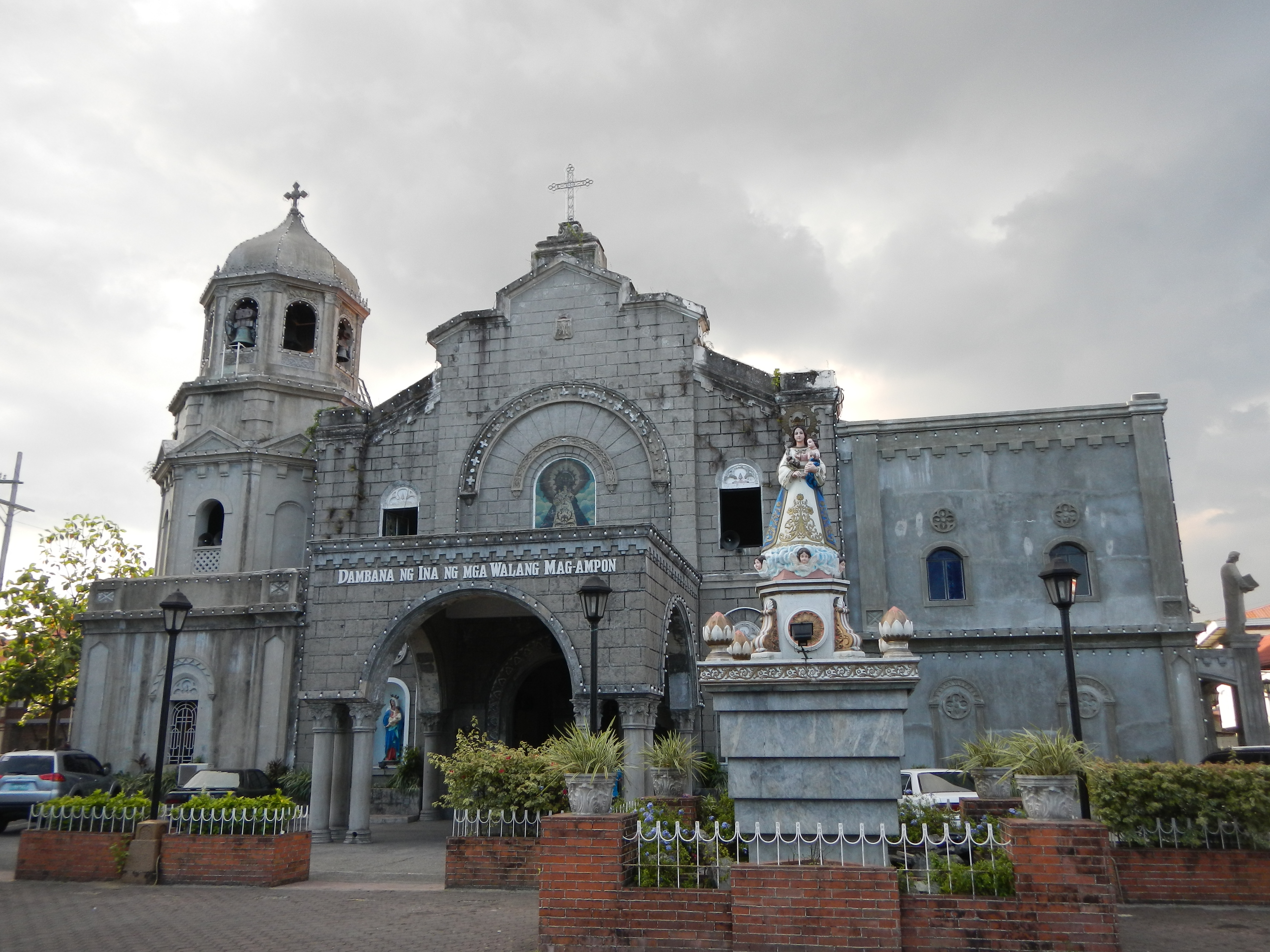
Our Lady of the Abandoned Parish Church

Marikina was one of the seats of the Spanish colonial government in past centuries and has been used as the base of Roman Catholic missions to the Philippines. Religious orders include the Dominicans, the Franciscans, the Jesuits and the Augustinians, which were the first to arrive in Marikina. The growing settlement of the descendants of Lakan Dula nurtured the establishment of the oldest Church in the history of the city which is known today as Jesus de la Pena Chapel, serving the original settlers of Marikina up to the present.

The Our Lady of the Abandoned Church, completed in 1572, is the seat of Nuestra Señora de los Desamparados, the Patron Saint of Marikina. The majority of the city's population is Roman Catholic.

Alternative incarnations of Christianity promoting their version of faith in the Philippines include Iglesia ni Cristo, the Seventh-day Adventist Church, Members Church of God International, The Church of Jesus Christ of Latter-day Saints, the Philippine Independent Church or popularly known as Aglipayan Church, the second-largest catholic denomination in Marikina, among other small Baptist churches and Christian groups. The headquarters of the Pentecostal Missionary Church of Christ (4th Watch) are located in the city. Other small religions in Marikina are Hinduism, Buddhism, Islam, and Sikhism.

== Economy ==
Poverty incidence of Marikina (%)

Source: Philippine Statistics Authority

=== Commercial and industrial ===
Marikina Town Center

The financial resources of Marikina are scattered all over the city, but the southern part is primarily concentrated, which includes business establishments and commercial facilities, while the northern part has factories and warehouses. Riverbanks Center is the city's commercial center, situated southwest of the city, where shopping malls and recreation areas are located. Real estate, residential condominiums, and commercial establishments along A. Bonifacio Avenue and Marcos Highway, and Sumulong Highway, where the Marikina Town Center is situated, are part of a community township developed by Federal Land featuring a FIFA-standard Marikina Town Center football field.

Fortune Avenue is home to some of the major companies such as Fortune Tobacco, Philip Morris, Armscor, and Noritake. Sumulong Highway is the center of business and local trade, and it has mixed establishments such as banks, boutiques, retail shops, electronics, appliances, and other consumer needs. Almost all the major international and local commercial and government banks in the Philippines operate branches in the city.

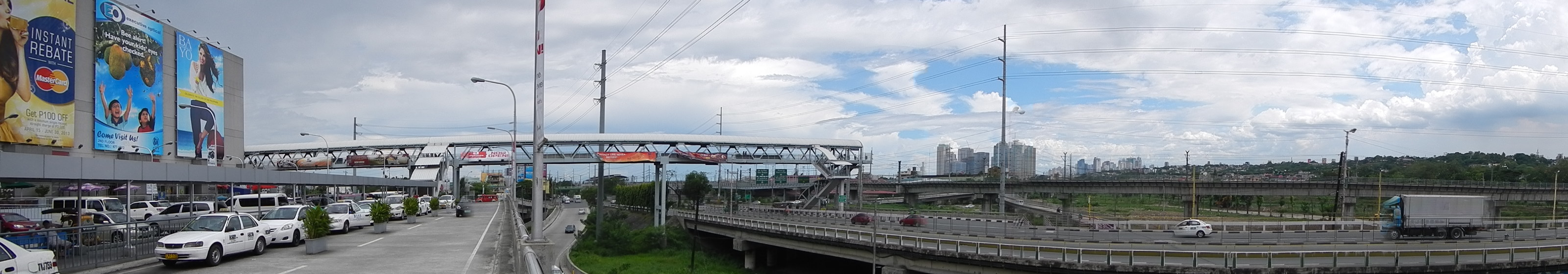
Panorama of southwest portion of Marikina near SM City Marikina. The bridges of Marcos Highway, C5-Diosdado Macapagal and LRT-2 Line crossing over Marikina River at the right

=== Shopping centers ===
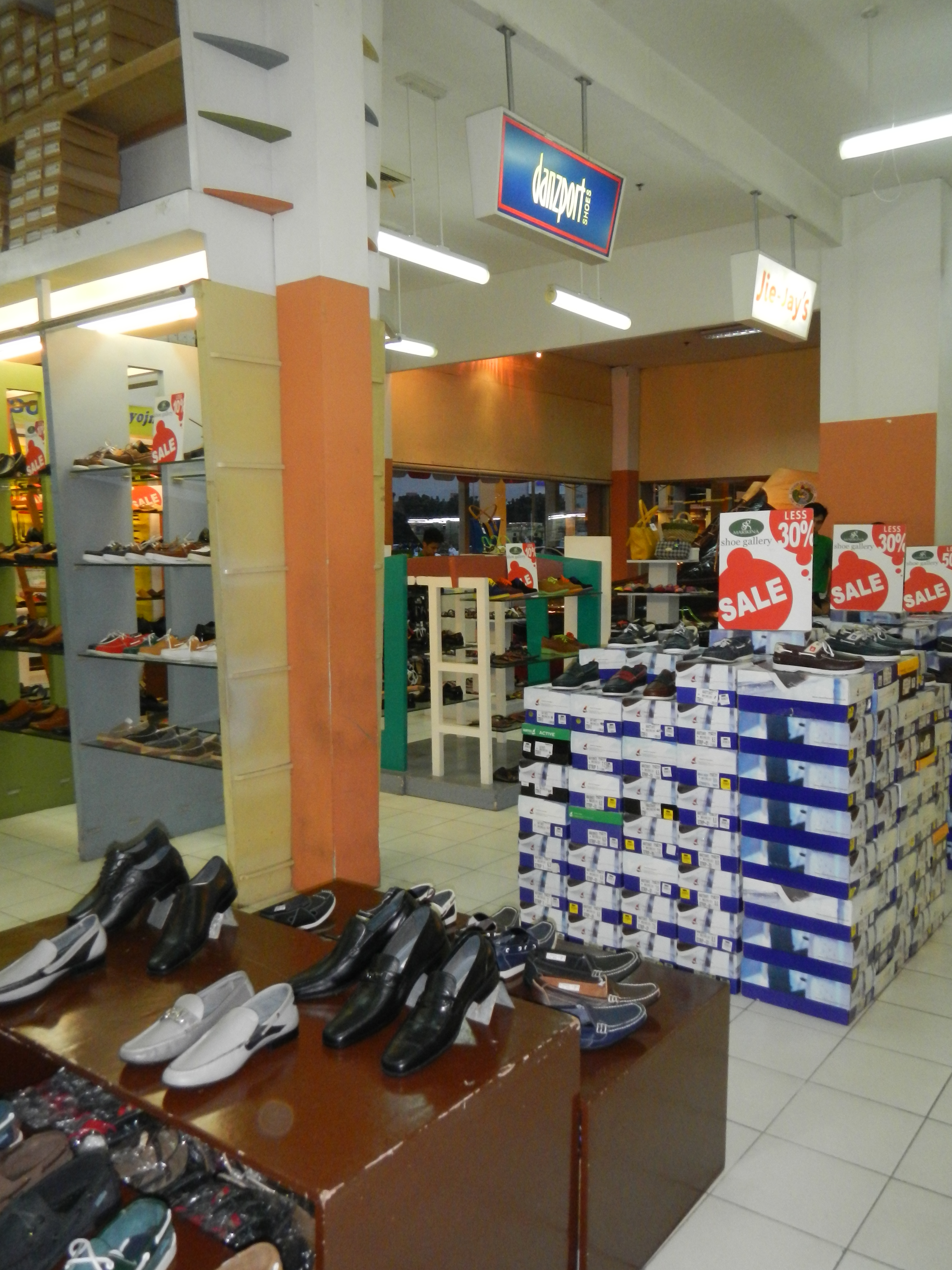
Shoes for sale inside Riverbanks Mall

SM City Marikina is currently the largest shopping mall in the city, while Riverbanks Center, a community shopping and commercial center, is one of the most popular outlet stores in the Philippines. Other shopping malls located in the city are Blue Wave Mall Marikina, Graceland Plaza, C&B Circle Mall, Xeland XentroMall, CitiCentre, and Ayala Malls Marikina, while Sienna Towers Residences Mall is one of the upcoming shopping malls in the city.

Other shopping centers just next to the Marikina boundary are Sta. Lucia East Grand Mall and Robinsons Metro East (near Barangay San Roque), and Ayala Malls Feliz (near Barangay Calumpang), are all located along Marikina-Infanta Highway, where these malls are closer and more accessible to Marikina than to their respective city proper

=== Public market ===
The Marikina Market Mall, a public market in the city, is a centralized modern market, converted streets into commercial and market lanes, and is one of the most popular and largest public markets in Metro Manila. The market is divided into two sections: the dry goods and the wet goods. Commerce in this market is active mostly during early mornings and late afternoons. There are also food stalls and eateries located inside the market. Some of Marikina's local products are handicrafts, sweet delicacies, leather, clothing, food processing, bags, accessories, and footwear.

=== Shoe industry ===
Marikina is the biggest manufacturer of quality shoes in the Philippines. It is also the Philippines' largest worldwide exporter of leather shoes, which has tagged Marikina as the Shoe Capital of the Philippines. Hundreds of footwear establishments are located throughout the city, generating thousands of jobs and city financial resources that continue to make the shoe and leather industry the top livelihood in the city. By the 2000s, the Marikina shoe industry was affected by competition from Chinese manufacturers.

=== Food tourism ===
Restaurants, cafés, diners, and entertainment bars are mostly concentrated along Gil Fernando Avenue, J. P. Rizal Street, and Bayanbayanan Avenue. Lilac Street in Barangay Concepcion Dos is a famous street for food hubs.

In 2025, the Michelin Guide for Manila and Cebu awarded a Bib Gourmand to Lola Helen Panciteria, a panciteria or noodle house in Barangay Santo Niño. The guide recognizes establishments with this distinction for offering good food at moderate prices.

== Government ==
=== Barangays ===
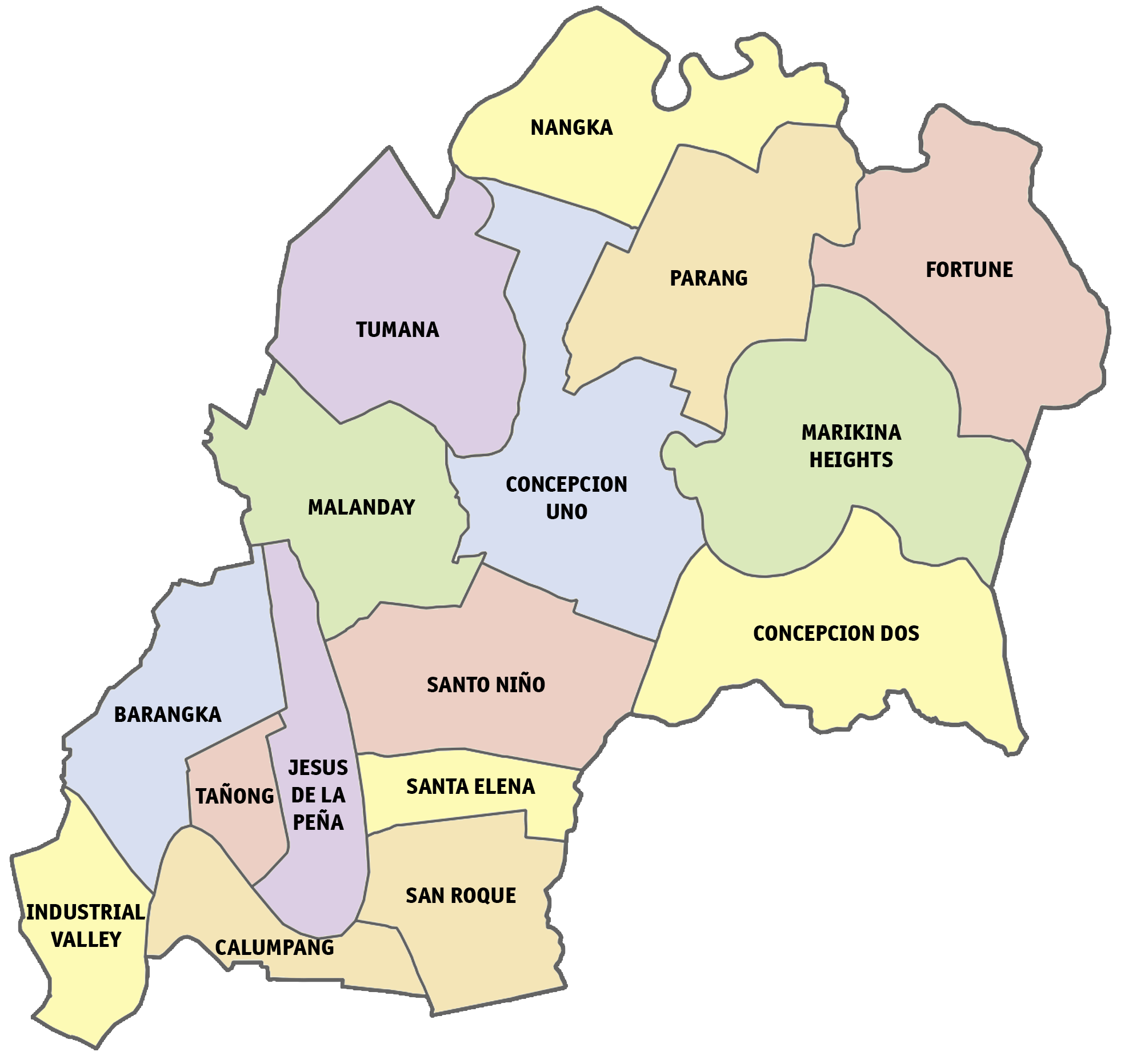
Political map of Marikina

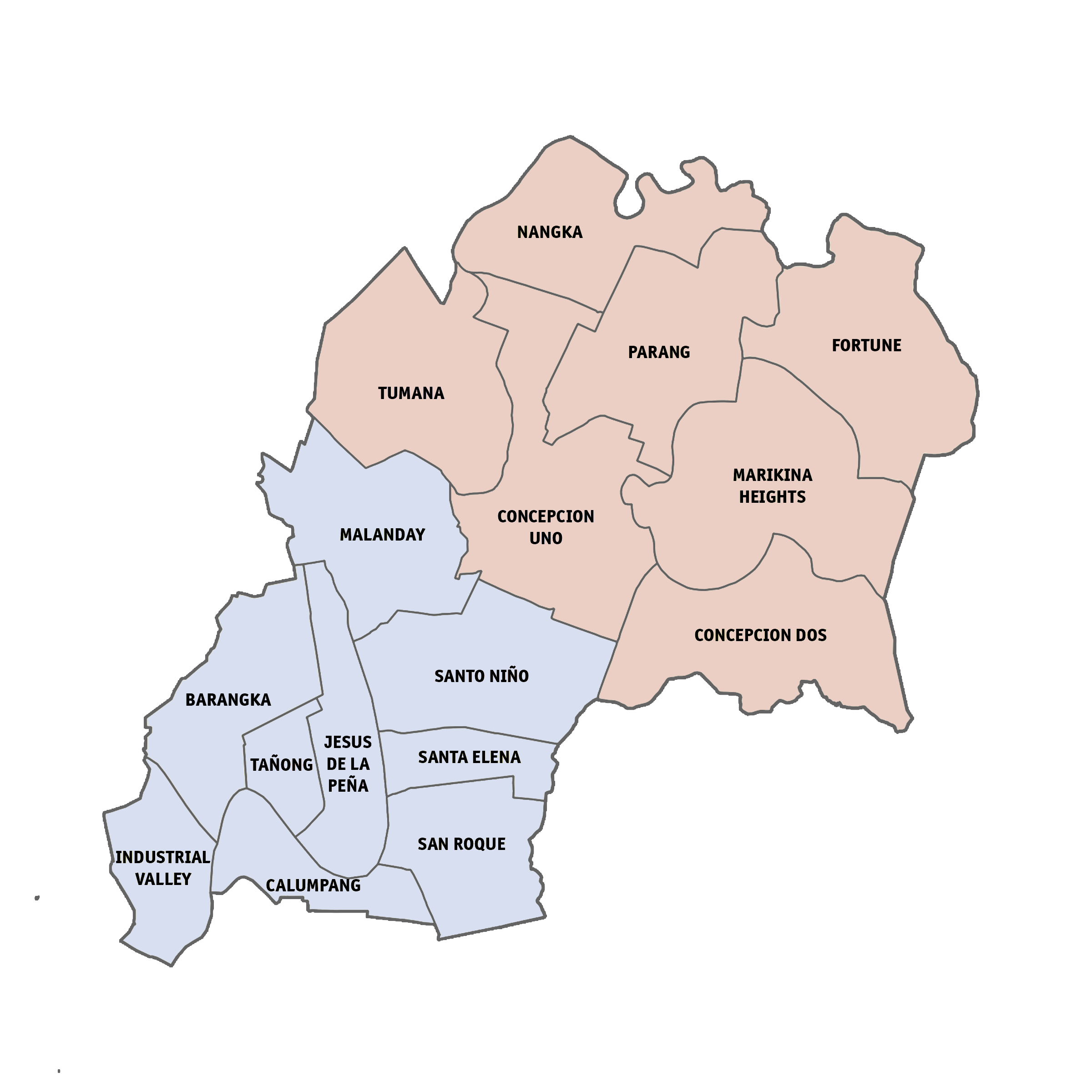
Legislative District map of Marikina First District Second District

Marikina is politically subdivided into 16 barangays. Its barangays are grouped into two districts for city council representation purposes. The first district encompasses the southern section of the city, while the second district encompasses the northern section. Among these barangays, 11 are traversed by Marikina River mostly on the west section of the city.

Barangays	District	Population^{a}	Area (ha)	Density (/ha)	Zip Code
Barangka	1st	16,639	117	158	1803
Calumpang	1st	15,602	72	206	1801
Concepcion Uno	2nd	44,683	213	184	1807
Concepcion Dos	2nd	24,023	184	139	1811
Fortune	2nd	38,624	219	165	1810
Industrial Valley	1st	16,461	65	246	1802
Jesus de la Peña	1st	10,201	82	124	1804
Malanday	1st	53,886	87	637	1805
Marikina Heights	2nd	42,761	206	188	1810
Nangka	2nd	43,368	182	241	1808
Parang	2nd	40,240	164	254	1809
San Roque	1st	16,949	109	165	1801
Santa Elena	1st	7,403	44	157	1800
Santo Niño	1st	28,849	146	211	1800
Tañong	1st	8,902	73	113	1803
Tumana	2nd	47,468	182	238	1805
Notes^a Population as of 2020.

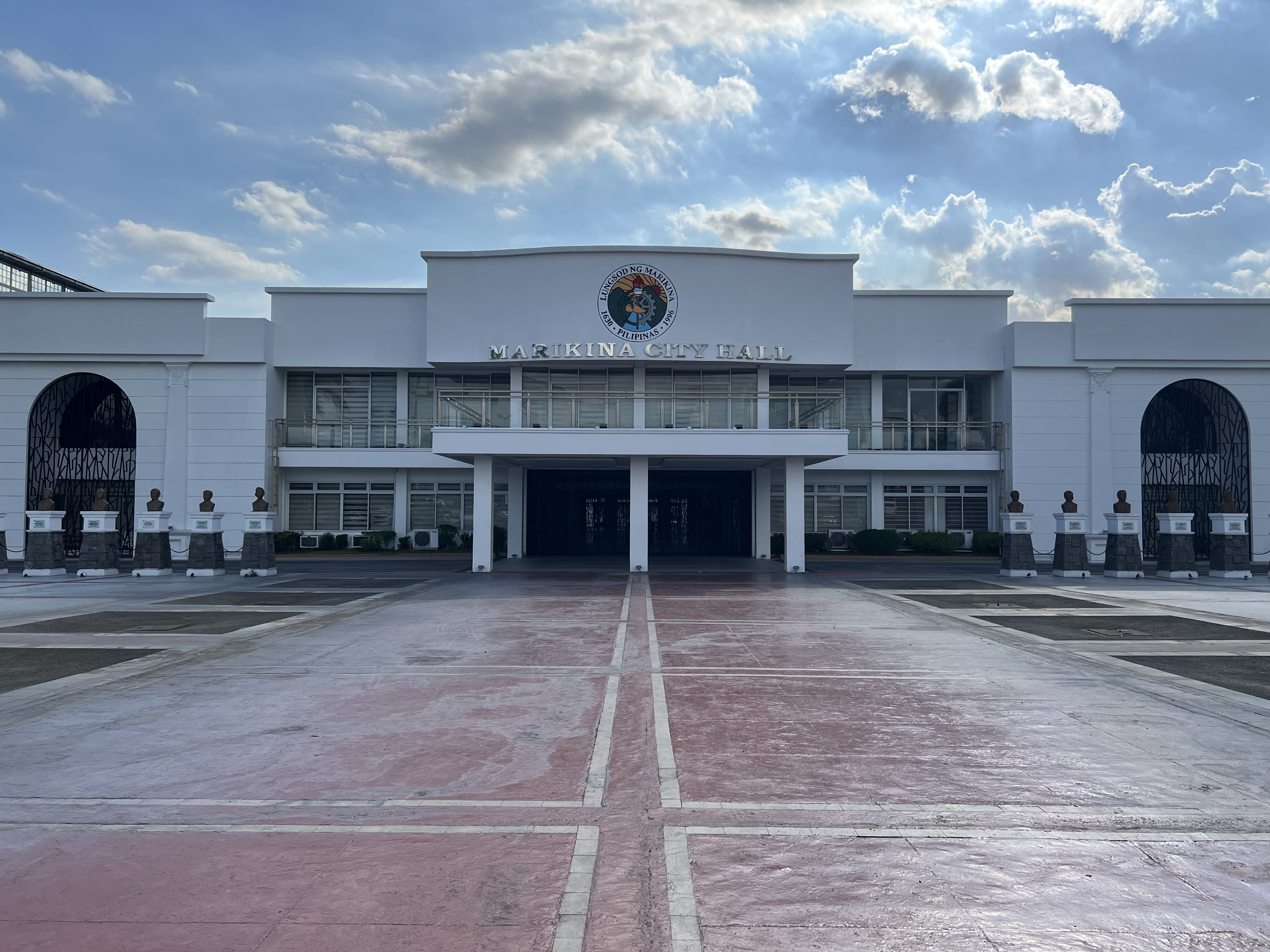
Marikina City Hall

=== Local government ===
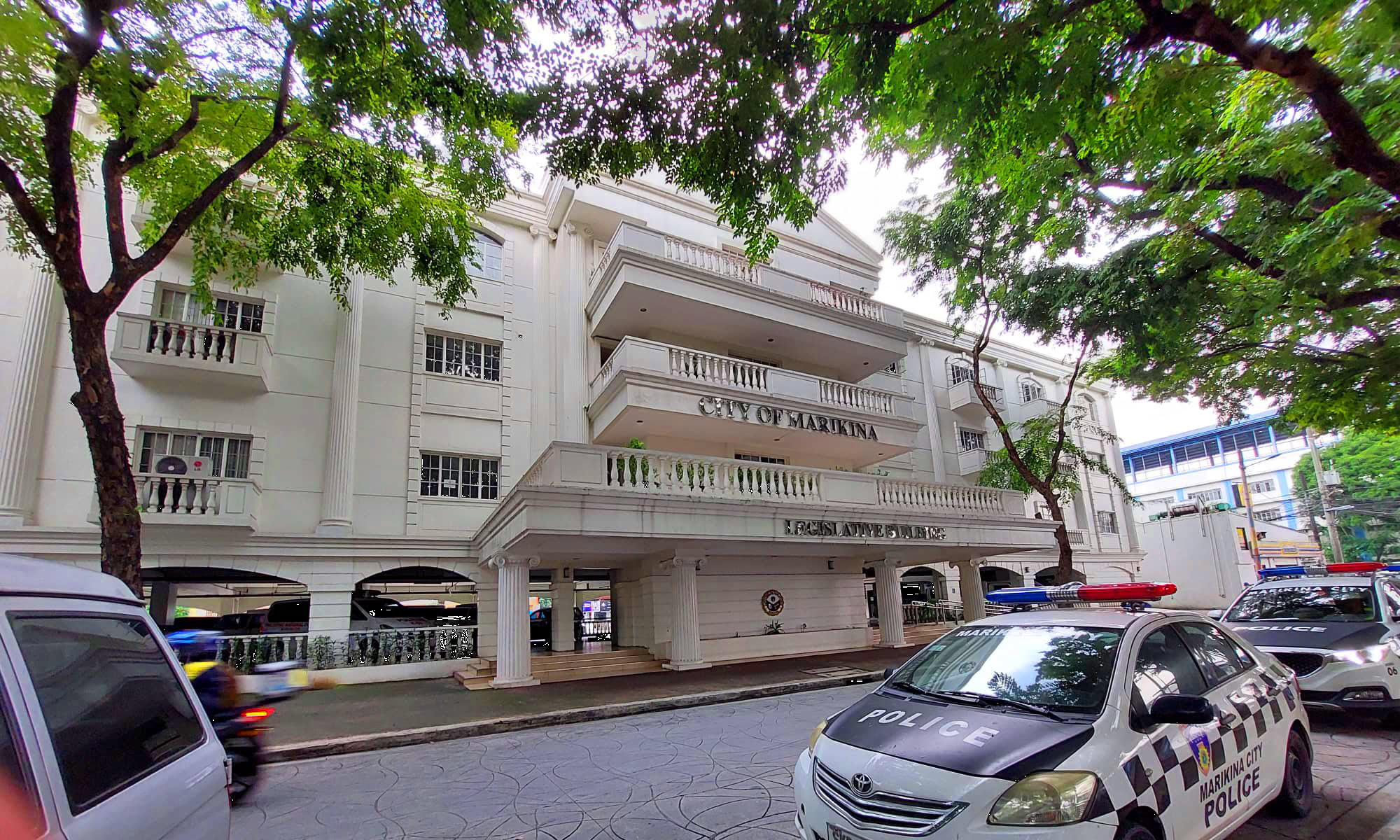
Marikina Legislative Building

Like in other city governments in the Philippines, Marikina is governed by a mayor and a vice mayor elected to three-year terms. The mayor is the executive head and leads the city's departments in executing city ordinances and improving public services, along with city councilors, while the vice mayor heads a legislative council, and these councilors represent the two legislative districts of the city. The council is in charge of formulating and enacting city ordinances.

Marikina, being a part of the Metro Manila region, has its mayor in the Metro Manila Council headed by the Metropolitan Manila Development Authority (MMDA). This council formulates development plans that seek to solve the problems and improve the conditions in the metropolis.

Marikina is made up of 16 barangays that handle governance in a much smaller area. These barangays are grouped into the aforementioned legislative districts. Each district is represented by a congressman, in turn, is represented in the House of Representatives of the Philippines

=== List of mayors ===
Official mayors

- Claudio Cruz (1861)
- Vivencio Cruz (1889)
- Remigio Victorino (1893-1894)
- Domingo Victoriano (1895-1896)
- Vicente Gomez (1900-1903)
- Domingo Victoriano (1904-1905)
- Ceferino Legazpi (1908-1909)
- Isabello Mendoza (1910-1911)
- Catalino Cruz (1912–1918)
- Jesus Villalon (1918-1928)
- Wenceslao dela Paz (1933-1938)
- Enrique dela Paz (1945-1946)
- Gil Estanislao Fernando (1947–1951)
- Juan Chanyungco (1951–1955)
- Gil Estanislao Fernando (1955–1959)
- Osmundo De Guzman (1959–1986)
- Rodolfo Valentino (1988–1992)
- Bayani Fernando (1992–2001)
- Maria Lourdes Fernando (2001–2010)
- Del De Guzman (2010–2016)
- Marcelino Teodoro (2016–2025)
- Marjorie Ann Teodoro (2025–present)

Acting mayors

- Juan Chanyungco (1938–1945)
- Gil Estanislao Fernando (1946-1947)
- Teofisto R. Santos (1986)
- Rodolfo B. Valentino (1986-1987)
- Guillermo S. Flores (1987-1988)
- Rommel Acuña (2025)

=== City seal ===
Seal of Marikina City

The official seal of the City of Marikina bears the inscriptions "Lungsod ng Marikina", "Pilipinas", "1630" (the founding year of the municipality), and "1996", the year of approval of the city charter. The two mountains represent the majestic twin ranges of the Cordillera and Sierra Madre, between which the Marikina Valley is nestled, traversed by the Marikina River. The rising sun points to the eastern location of the city, with each ray representing the city's barangays. The machinery gear symbolizes its industries and the shoe last represents the traditional manufacturing in the city. The torch focuses on the lofty and noble ideals for human development and a better quality of life and is symbolic of its Hispanic culture and tradition. The bamboo underscores a mixture of the people's natural humility and strength of character and also emphasizes the city's transition from an agricultural past to the urbanized, industrial present; the leaves and branches symbolize order and serenity. The bamboo and the wheel represent Marikina and its people's respect for and protection of the environment so as to remain in harmony with progress.

== Culture ==
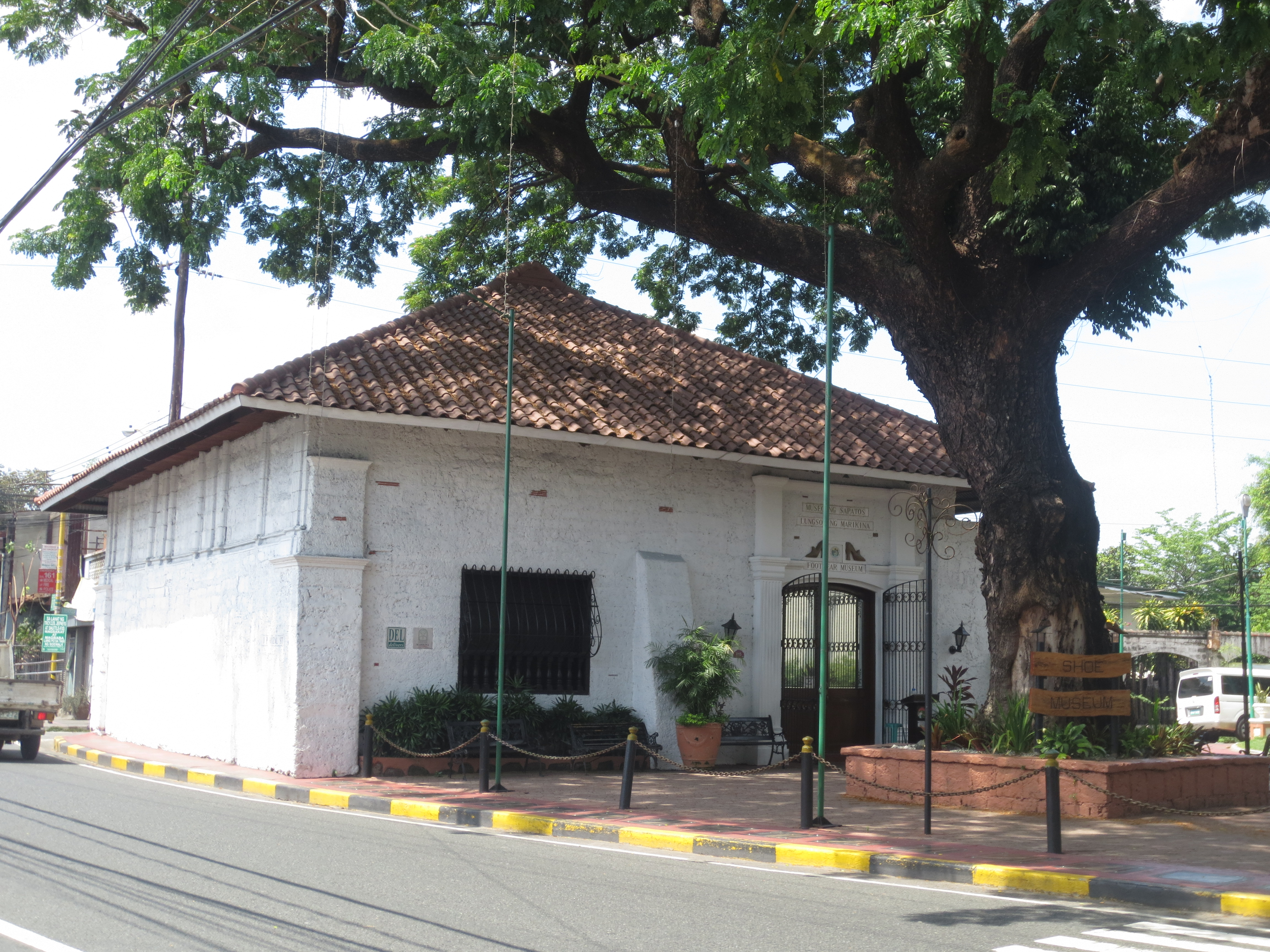
Shoe Museum

Local cuisines such as Everlasting, a popular dish in Marikina similar to Embutido but it is cooked in "lyanera", while Waknatoy, a unique dish is simply a variant of Menudo with the addition of pickles which gives Waknatoy a sweet-tangy flavor, and Laoya, a dish similar to Nilaga with the addition of pounded garlic, sweet potato and saba banana.

Marikina's festivities are rich in culture, tradition, and the people themselves. Several ancestral houses can be found along J. P. Rizal Street in Barangay Santa Elena. Teatro Marikina is the center of the performing arts in Marikina. The traditional dance in Marikina is Lerion, the official folk dance of Marikina.

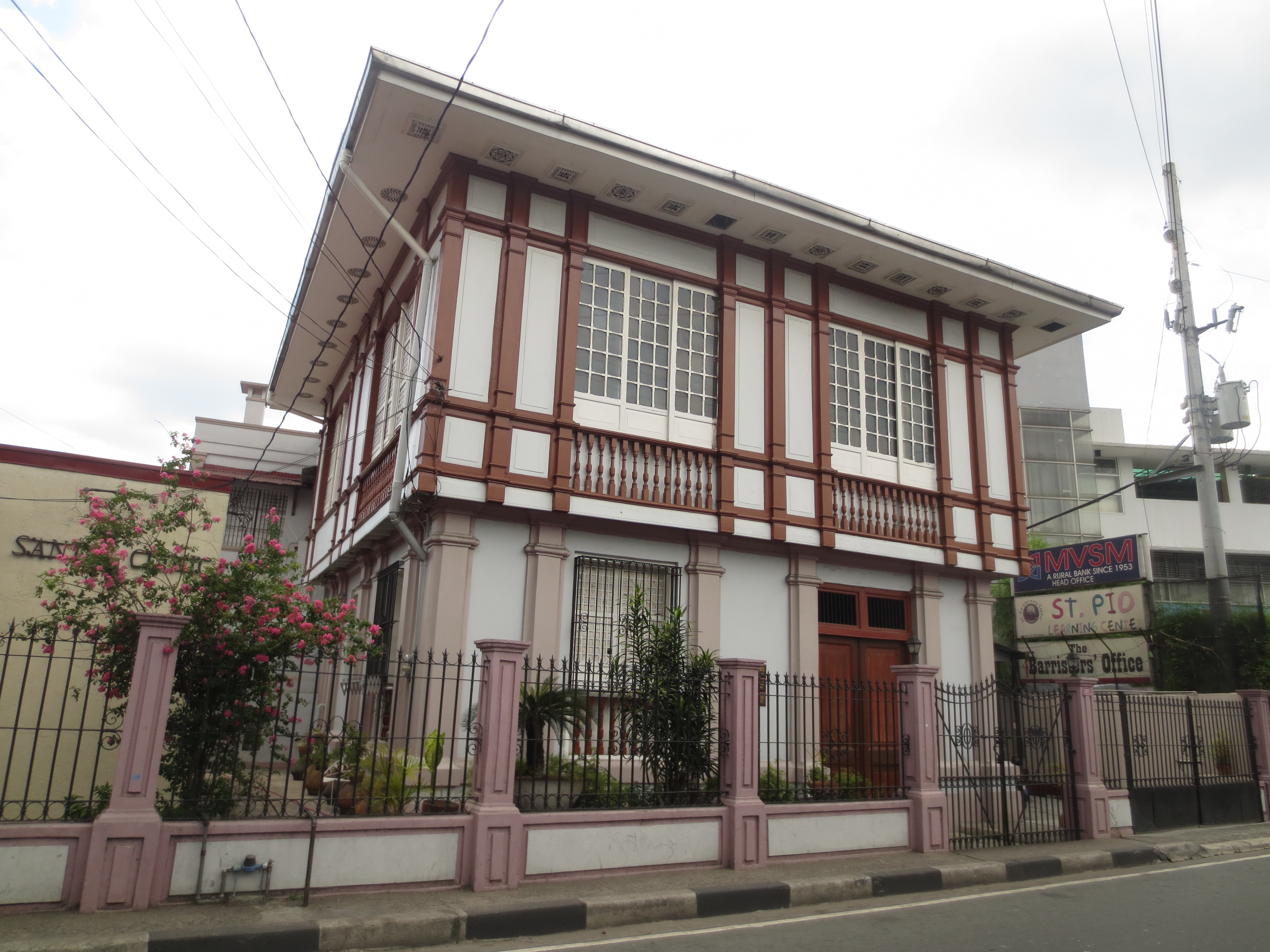
Zamora Ancestral House

Some of the local festivities in Marikina include: Ka-Angkan Festival is a feast that coincides with the founding anniversary of Marikina on April 16. It is an event that honors the large native clans of the city that have unique monikers; Marikina Christmas Festival/Shopalooza/ChristmasSaya is a long holiday festival filled with stalls selling a wide variety of goods at affordable prices. The festival starts as early as October and runs until February of the following year, mostly concentrated in Marikina River Park and Riverbanks Center; Rehiyon-Rehiyon Festival showcases the various ethnic groups that make up the people of Marikina. It serves as a tribute to the active community who came from other regions of the country and chose to settle in Marikina. It proves that unity can be achieved despite diverse backgrounds and different dialects. The festival is celebrated every year on December 8, when Marikina was established as a city; and lastly, the Sapatos Festival, since Marikina was tagged as the Shoe Capital, the city celebrates the Sapatos Festival every year, from mid-September until the year ends. This is a celebration of the ingenuity and craftsmanship of shoemakers in Marikina. It gives due recognition to their hardship and the local shoe industry itself.

== Sports ==
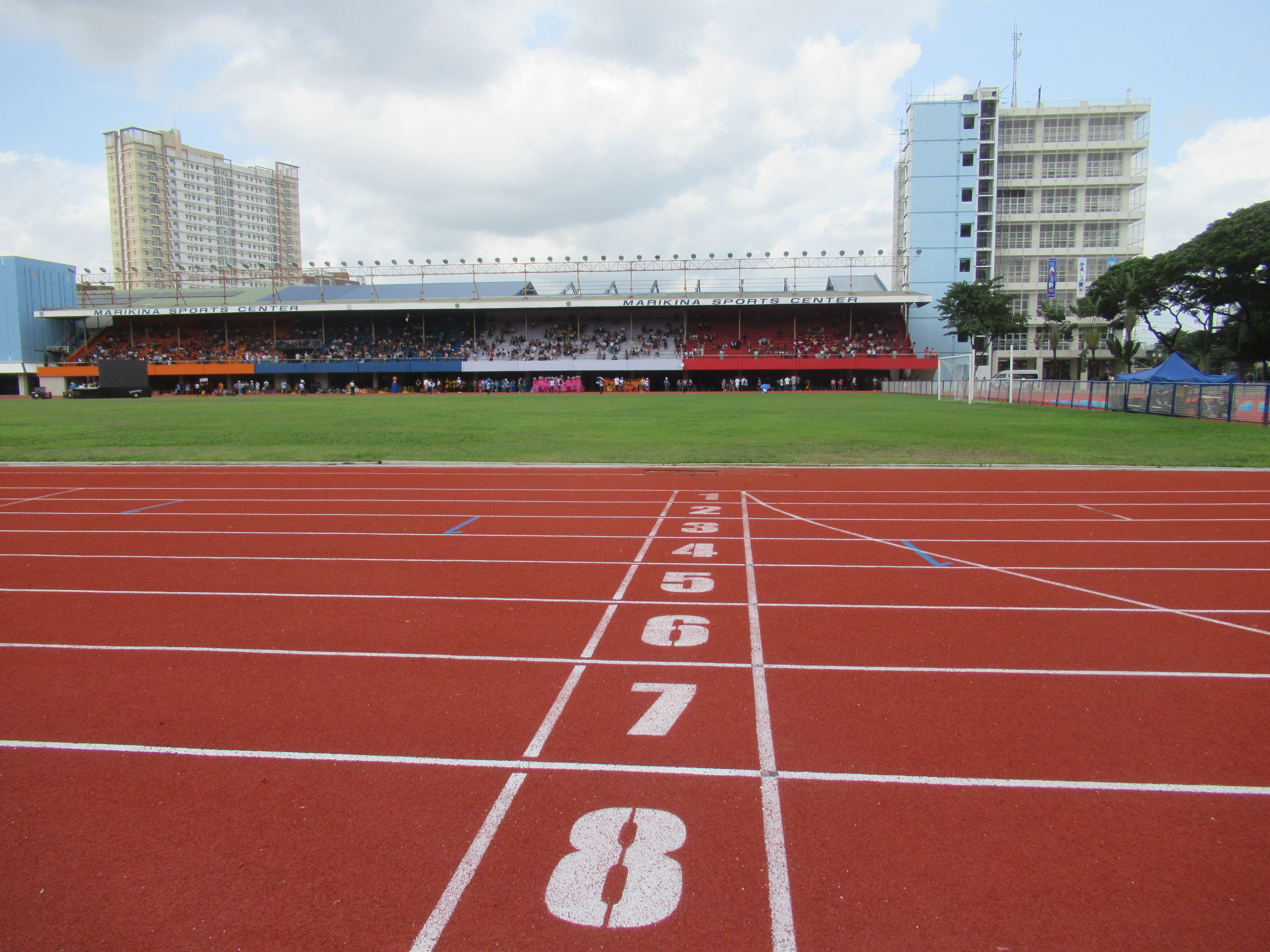
Track oval in Marikina Sports Center

Marikina Sports Center (formerly named Rodriguez Sports Center) is located at the corner of Sumulong Highway and Shoe Avenue, is a prominent structure located in Marikina and a notable sports complex in the Philippines.

The complex was first opened in 1969. It features a football field and athletics stadium consisting of an athletics oval track, a 64-meter (210 ft) wide natural grass pitch, bicycle track, and two grandstands: the West and East Stands. The grandstands have a total seating capacity of 15,000 people. Between the West Stand and the athletics track, the basketball, volleyball, badminton, and tennis courts are located. The West Stand is situated along Shoe Avenue, where a transportation hub is located. The East Stand is connected to Marikina Sports Center indoor facilities such as an Olympic-size swimming pool inside an aquatics center, a sports building, an indoor gymnasium, and other establishments such as sports and souvenir shops, food stalls, and convenience stores. The area has been host to several sports competitions, both regional, national, and international, as well as entertainment such as grand concerts, finals night, live television shows, and other events.

Marikina's professional basketball team is the Marikina Shoemasters of the Maharlika Pilipinas Basketball League (MPBL), which joined the league in the 2018–19 season. Its volleyball counterpart, the Marikina Lady Shoemasters, is one of the founding members of the grassroots Maharlika Pilipinas Volleyball Association (MPVA). Marikina also used to be home to JPV Marikina F.C., which last played in the Philippines Football League (PFL) in 2018.

== Transportation ==
=== Public transport ===
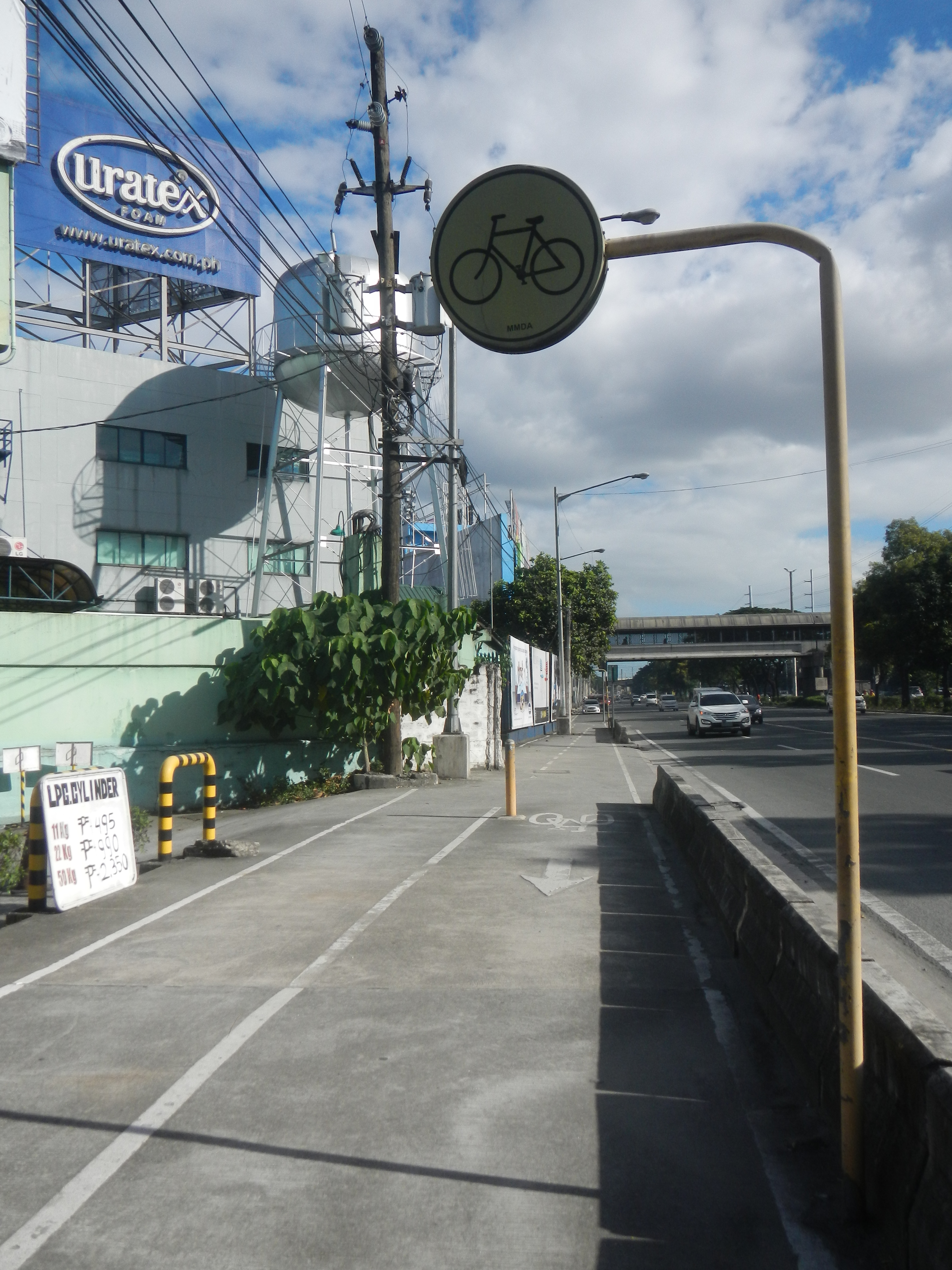
A bicycle lane along Marikina–Infanta Highway in Calumpang

Public transportation within the city, like in most of the urban areas in the Philippines, is facilitated mostly using jeepneys and buses. Tricycles and pedicabs give access to more secluded areas, while taxicabs and a carpooling transport system are available throughout the city. FX taxis have begun to compete directly with jeepneys on major roads while UV Express transport services are also available in selected terminals. BFCT East Metro Transport Terminal, located in Marikina–Infanta Highway-C-5 Interchange near SM Marikina, is a major public transport terminal east of Metro Manila. It is a part of decongesting the traffic in Metro Manila and other neighboring areas that offer interisland bus service destinations.

In the early 2000s, Marikina became one of the pioneers in promoting a "bicycle-friendly" city by building bike lanes along major roads and city streets. The local government constructed a 66-kilometer network of bikeways to help reduce air pollution, greenhouse gas emissions, fuel consumption, and traffic congestion in the city. The bikeways project provides an estimated annual savings of 250 tons/km of carbon dioxide, 0.02 tons of particulate matter, and 0.13 tons of NOx. The World Health Organization awarded the project in 2008 in the category of climate change and health. In 2012, the longest bike lane during that time was opened along the stretch of the Marikina–Infanta Highway.

In January 2016, the city government of Marikina invented the "AMV" or "Adaptive Mobile Vehicle" for PWDs or Persons with Disabilities and Senior Citizens. The "AMV" is a wheelchair vehicle that can put a wheelchair. The local government of Marikina wants to be a "friendly city" for the Senior Citizens.

Marikina River is the main waterway in Marikina and is used by local fisherfolk as a mode of river transport. The river ferry service was to begin operation with the opening of the Riverbanks and Sta. Elena ferry stations in 2008, but due to the onslaught of Tropical Storm Ketsana in 2009 and heavy rainfall and storms in the following years that caused the river to overflow, the ferry service was canceled and ceased operation. Recently, the Metropolitan Manila Development Authority is looking into plans to extend the Pasig River Ferry Service route to reach Marikina River and give commuters on the eastern side of Metro Manila an alternative and faster mode of transportation, but it is still undergoing vehicular planning. River ferry terminals are still not operational in the city due to the threat of overflowing water in the river during heavy downpours or typhoon season.

=== Road network ===
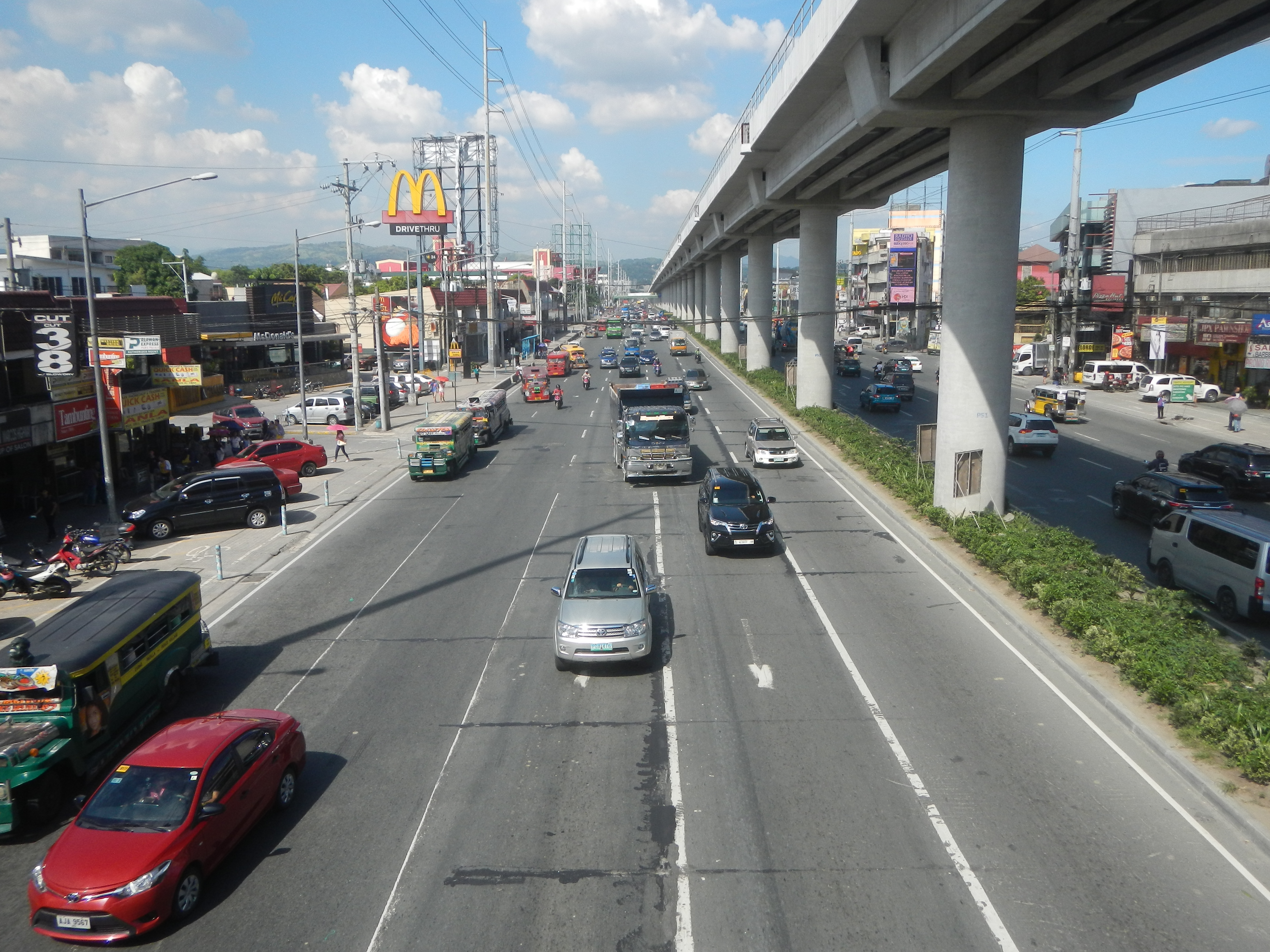
Marikina–Infanta Highway and LRT-2 Line

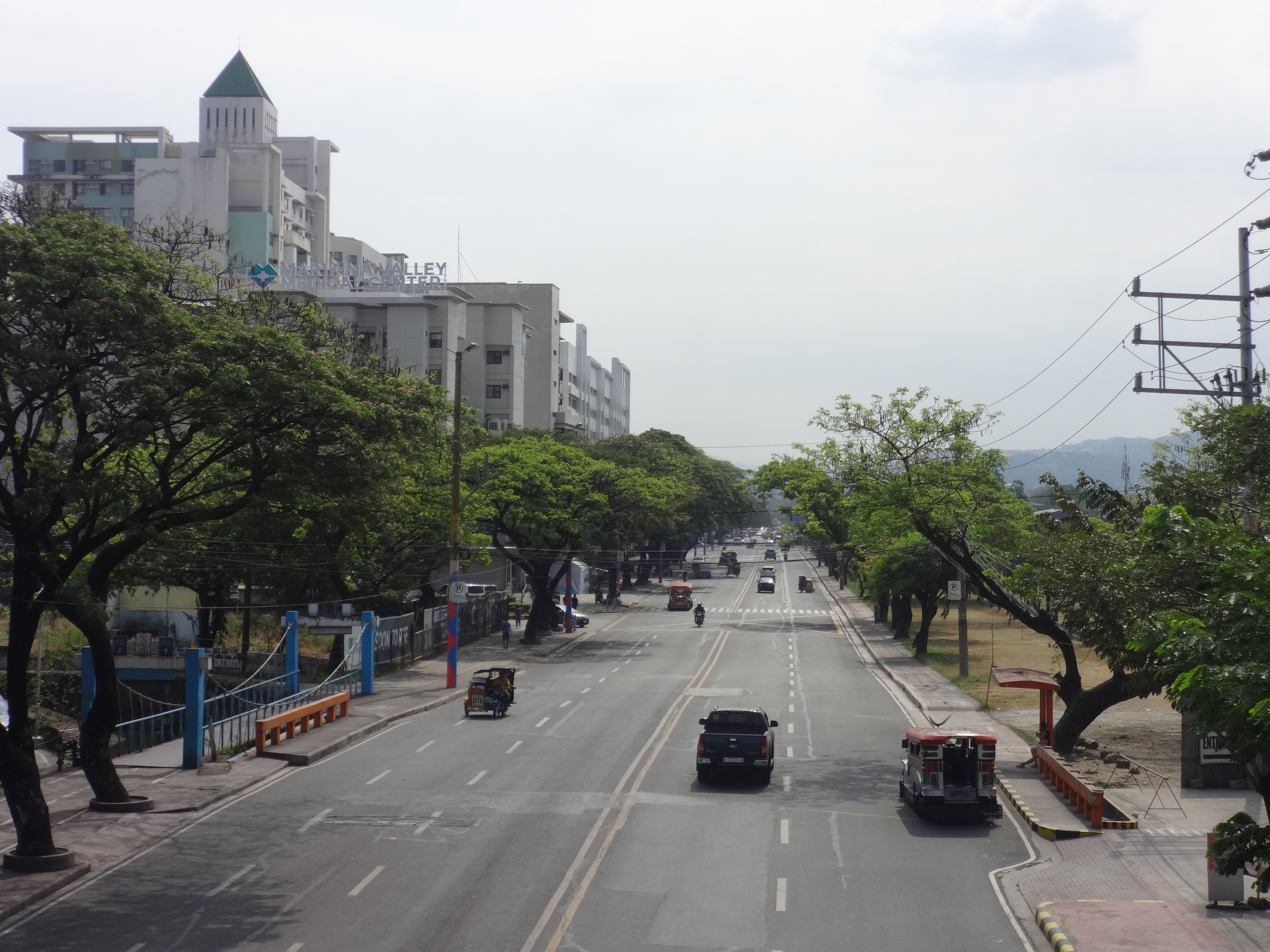
Sumulong Highway

The following major roads and thoroughfares access in Marikina:

- N59/R-6: Marikina–Infanta Highway (known as Marilaque Highway and Marcos Highway)
- N11: FVR (Fidel V. Ramos) Road (known as C-5 Access Road)
- Sumulong Highway
- A. Bonifacio Avenue
- J. P. Rizal Street
- Mayor Gil Fernando Avenue (future segment of "Lower C-6 Road" northbound extension)
- Shoe Avenue
- Bayan-Bayanan Avenue
- General Ordoñez Avenue
- Bagong Farmers Avenue 1
- C. M. Recto Street (known as Fortune Avenue)
- Lilac Street
- Katipunan Street
- Liwasan Kalayaan Street
- Eraño G. Manalo Street
- Major Dizon Street
- Champaca Street

=== Bridges ===
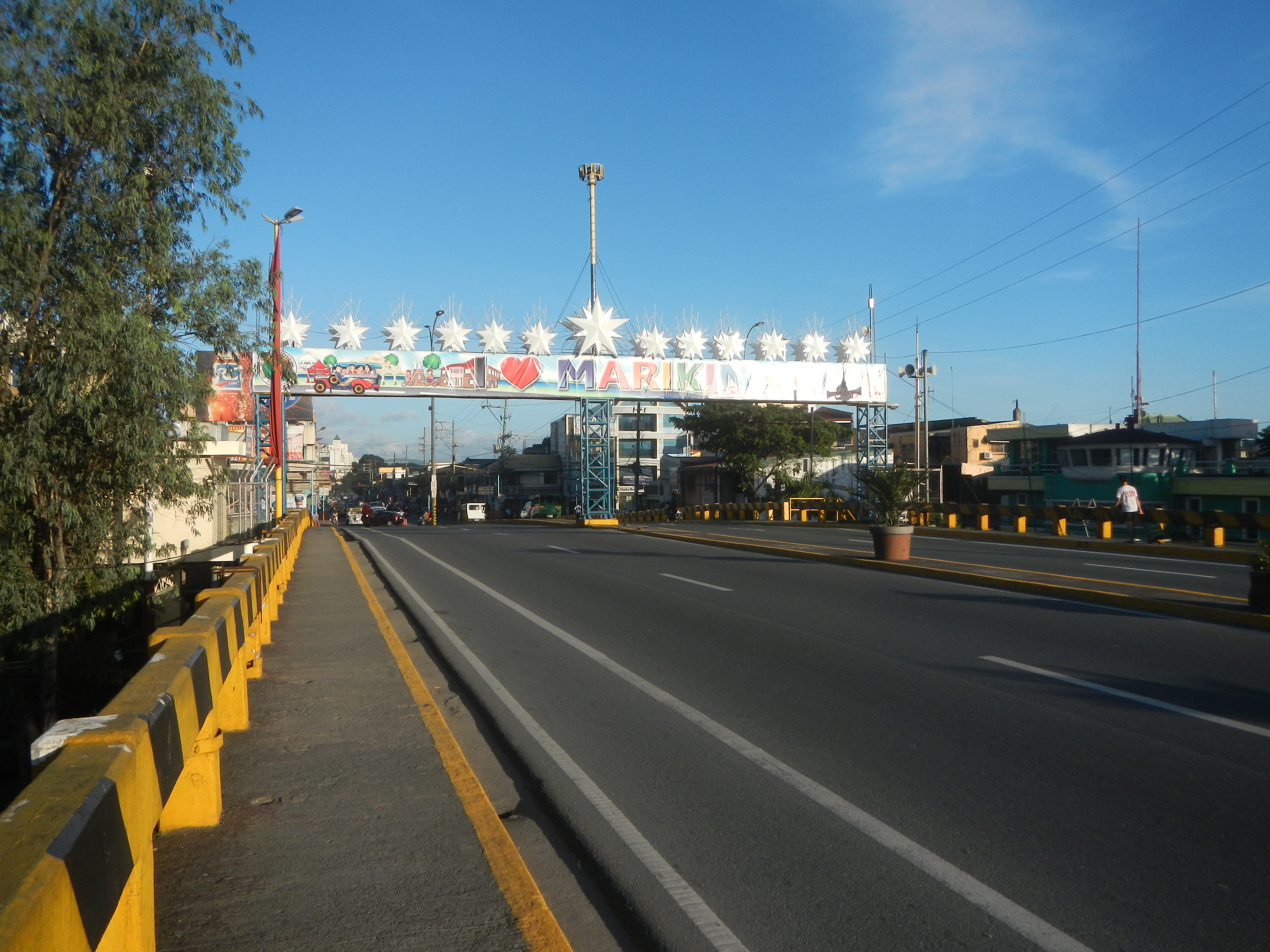
Marikina Bridge

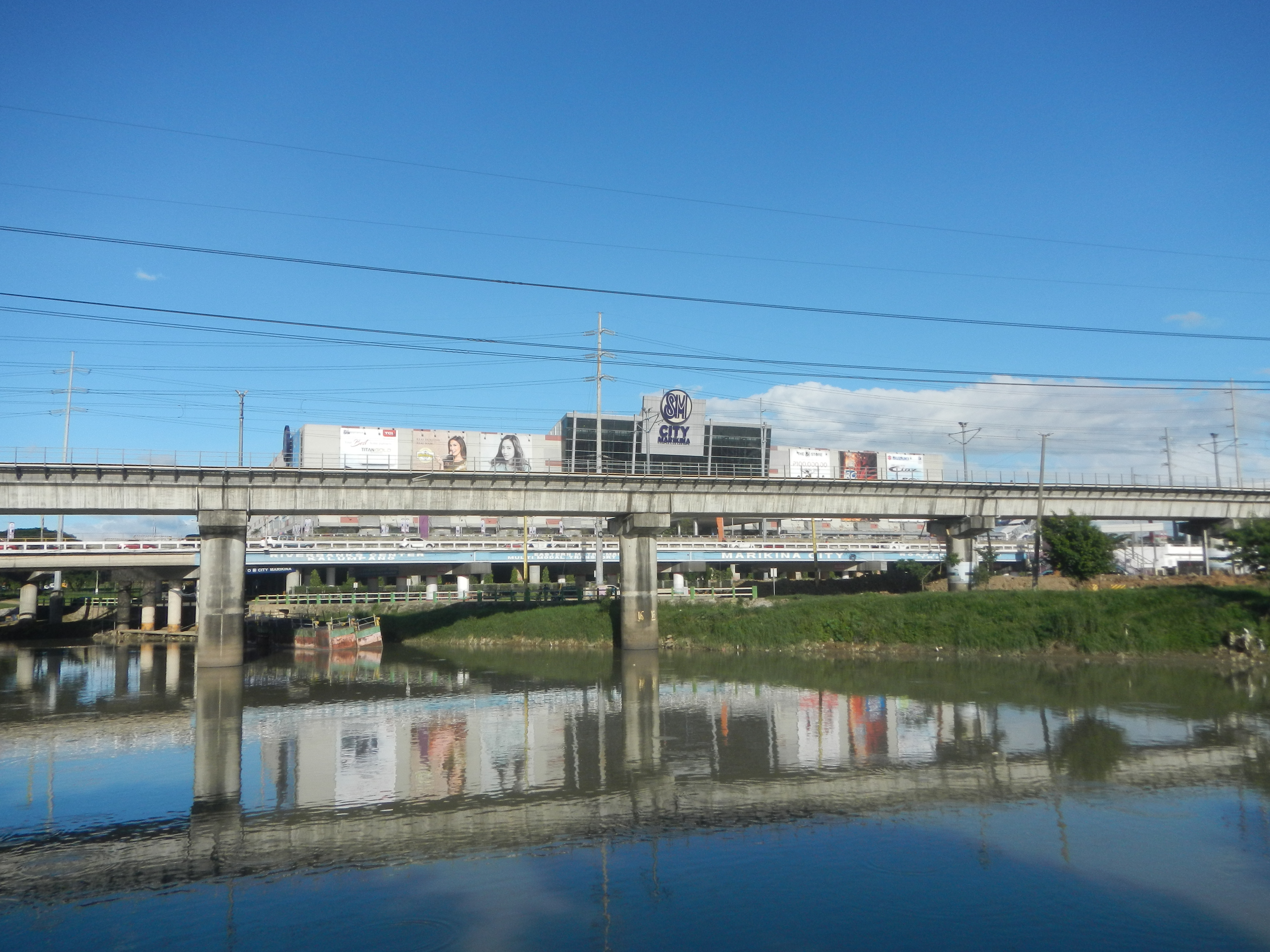
LRT-2 Line Bridge (in front) and Marcos Bridge (behind)

The following major bridges provide access in Marikina:

- Marikina Bridge (spans Marikina River)
- Marcos Bridge (spans Marikina River)
- President Diosdado Macapagal Bridge (spans Marikina River)
- SM Marikina Access Bridge (spans Marikina River; outer bridge of Marcos Bridge, access to SM City Marikina)
- Gil Fernando Bridge (spans Marikina River; known as Tumana Bridge)
- LRT Line 2 Bridge (spans Marikina River)
- Nangka Bridge (spans Nangka River, boundary bridge between Marikina and San Mateo, Rizal)
- Fortune Bridge (spans Nangka River, boundary bridge between Marikina and San Mateo, Rizal)
- Monterrey Bridge (spans Nangka River, boundary bridge between Marikina and San Mateo, Rizal)
- Barangka Flyover (boundary overpass between Marikina and Quezon City)

=== Railway ===
Marikina–Pasig station platform

Santolan station

The LRT Line 2 runs through the city, operated by the Light Rail Transit Authority. The current elevated light rail metro stations in use are Santolan station in Barangay Santolan in Pasig, near the border of Barangay Calumpang in Marikina, and Marikina–Pasig station in Barangay San Roque, both are located on the stretch of Marikina–Infanta Highway. These stations serve the city and connect to the west end, Recto station in the City of Manila, and connect to the east-end terminus, Antipolo station in Antipolo, Rizal.

The following light rail metro station served the city:

Line 2

- Marikina station (also known as Marikina–Pasig station)
- Santolan station

LRT Line 2 San Mateo Spur Line (San Mateo Railway Project)

The proposed project has received approval to allocate funds for feasibility studies from the Project Development and Monitoring Facility (PDMF) Committee. Once finished, this will be submitted to and await approval from the Investment Coordination Committee to confirm the viability of this project's public-private partnership (PPP) implementation. The line will span a total of 17 km. that traverses Marikina, San Mateo, and Rodriguez, and will be connected to the LRT-2 via a feeder railway line. It will have six stations running through Marikina, San Mateo, and Rodriguez. It aims to connect the line from LRT-2 to Marikina and the high-density sub-urban areas of the northwest part of Rizal Province. The location of the stations and the line that will run through are yet to be determined.

MRT Line 7 Katipunan Spur Line

Plans were also laid out for a 13.9-kilometer (8.6 mi) additional spur line, known as the MRT Line 7 Katipunan Spur Line, that aims to connect the line from MRT-7 Tandang Sora station to the east of Metro Manila. The proposed spur line will traverse in Marikina through Andres Bonifacio Avenue, Sumulong Highway, and Mayor Gil Fernando Avenue.

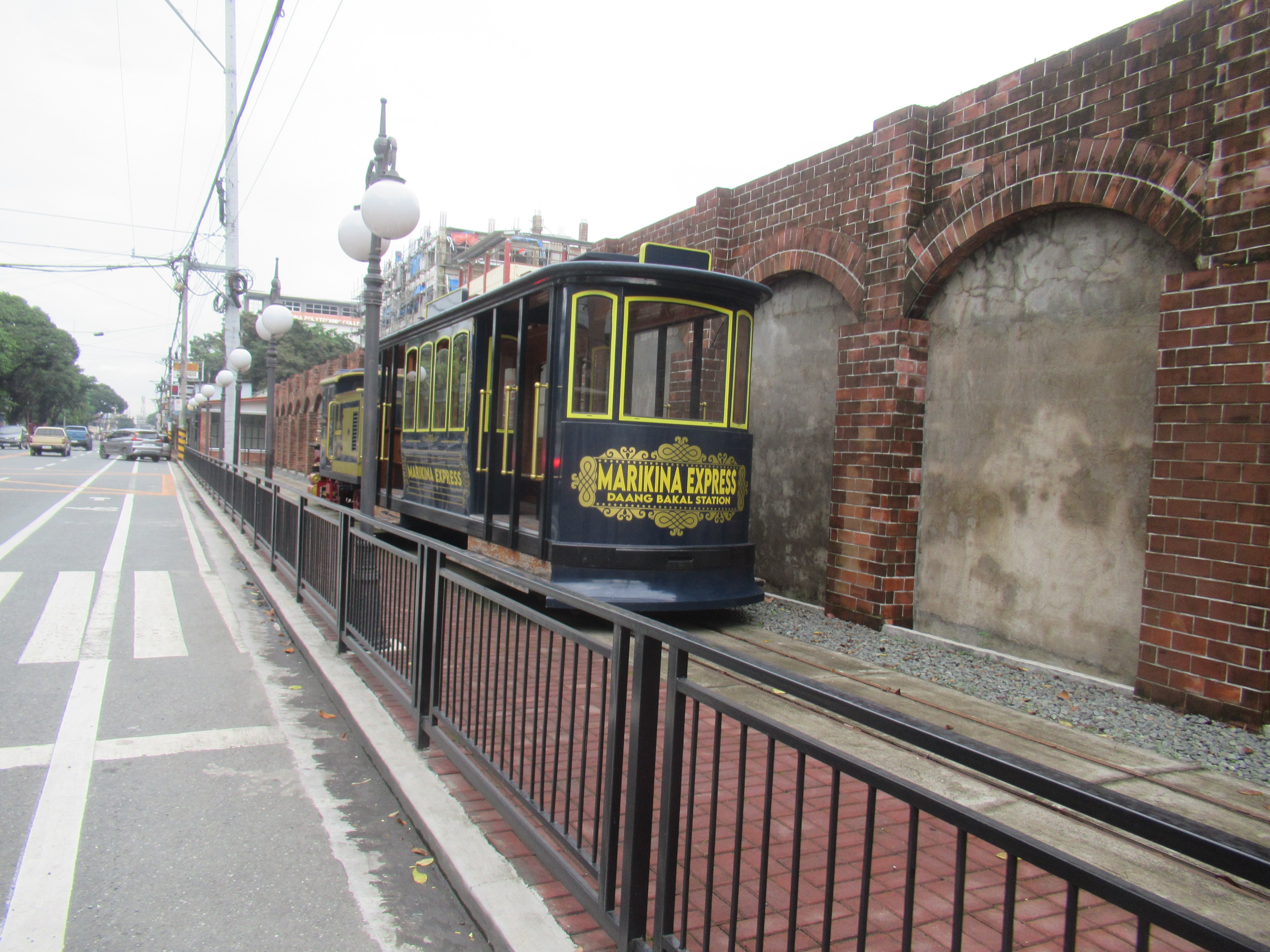
"Antiguo Tren de Marikina" Park, situated along Shoe Avenue (location of former train line called Montalban Line), a replica of a steam locomotive train that passes through the city in the early 1900s.

Line 7 (with 3 proposed stations)

- Riverbanks
- Sumulong
- Emerald–Marikina (connected to Line 2)

Old Marikina Line (Rosario-Montalban branch)

The Manila Railroad Company (now Philippine National Railways) previously had a line to Montalban (now Rodriguez, Rizal) traversing Marikina with four stations: Mariquina, Santo Niño, Bayan-Bayanan, and Nangka, which started its operation in 1906. Mariquina station was the only surviving station of that structure on the Montalban line. Currently, there is a road named "Daangbakal", also called by the present names of "Shoe Avenue", "Munding Avenue" and "Bagong Silang", these roads are formerly the old tracks of the Montalban Line from Tramo (now Rosario, Pasig) traversing Marikina connected up to San Mateo, and ended in Montalban. In 1936, passenger operations ceased, and after World War II, the line and its stations were abandoned.

== Healthcare ==
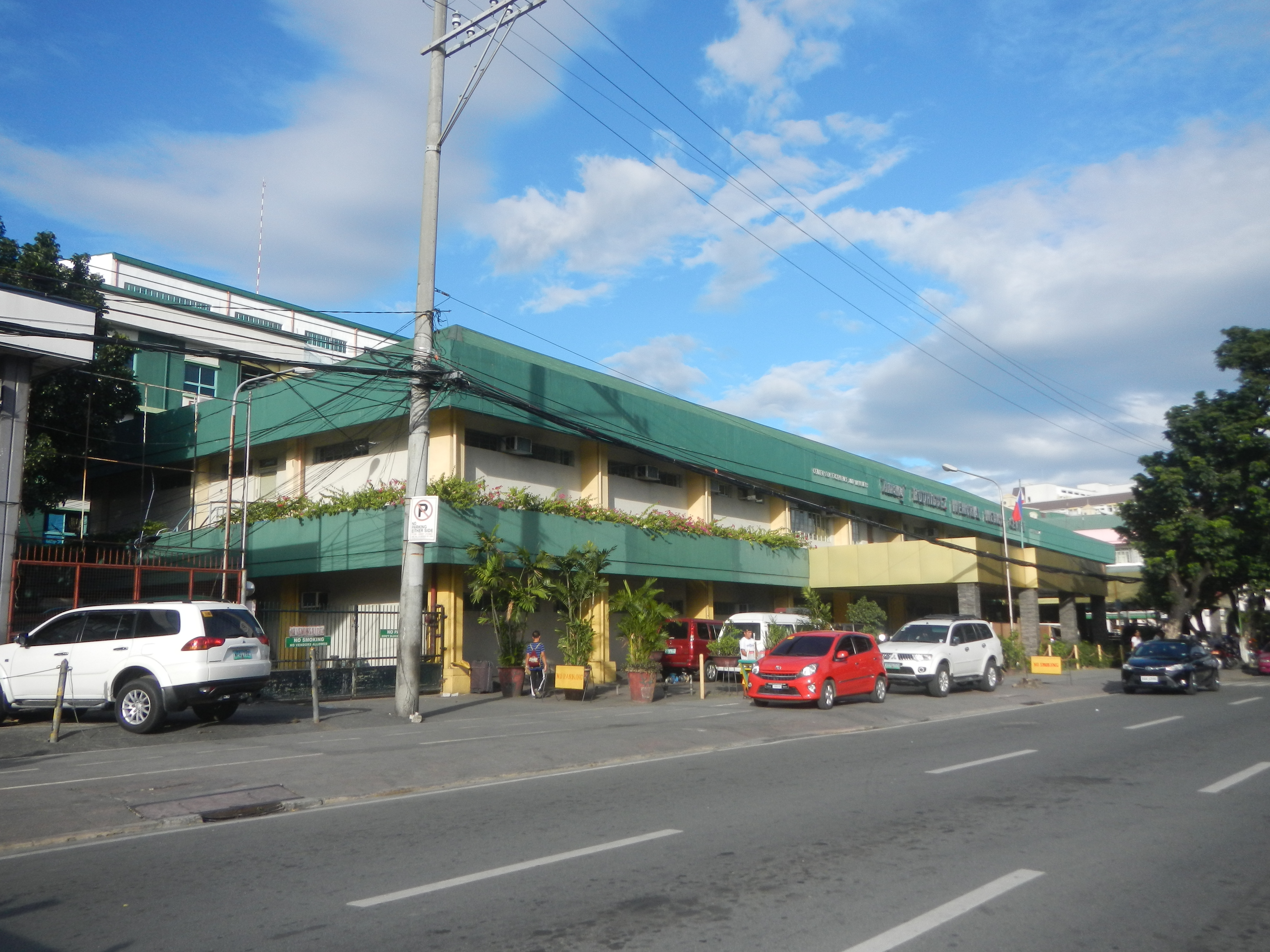
Amang Rodriguez Memorial Medical Center

Marikina Health Office is a center of health services in the city and is responsible for providing healthcare services as well as planning and implementing the healthcare programs provided by the city government. It operates health centers and lying-in clinics in each barangay to provide basic medical services in the community.

Amang Rodriguez Memorial Medical Center is a major public hospital in Marikina and one of the largest medical facilities in the east of Metro Manila and Rizal Province. Other major private hospitals include Mariina Valley Medical Center, Garcia General Hospital, Immaculate Concepcion Hospital, Marikina Doctors Hospital and Medical Center, Noah Medical Center, San Ramon Hospital, SDS Medical Center, St. Anthony Medical Center, St. Victoria Hospital, St. Vincent General Hospital and VT Maternity Hospital.

== Public utilities ==
=== Safety and security ===
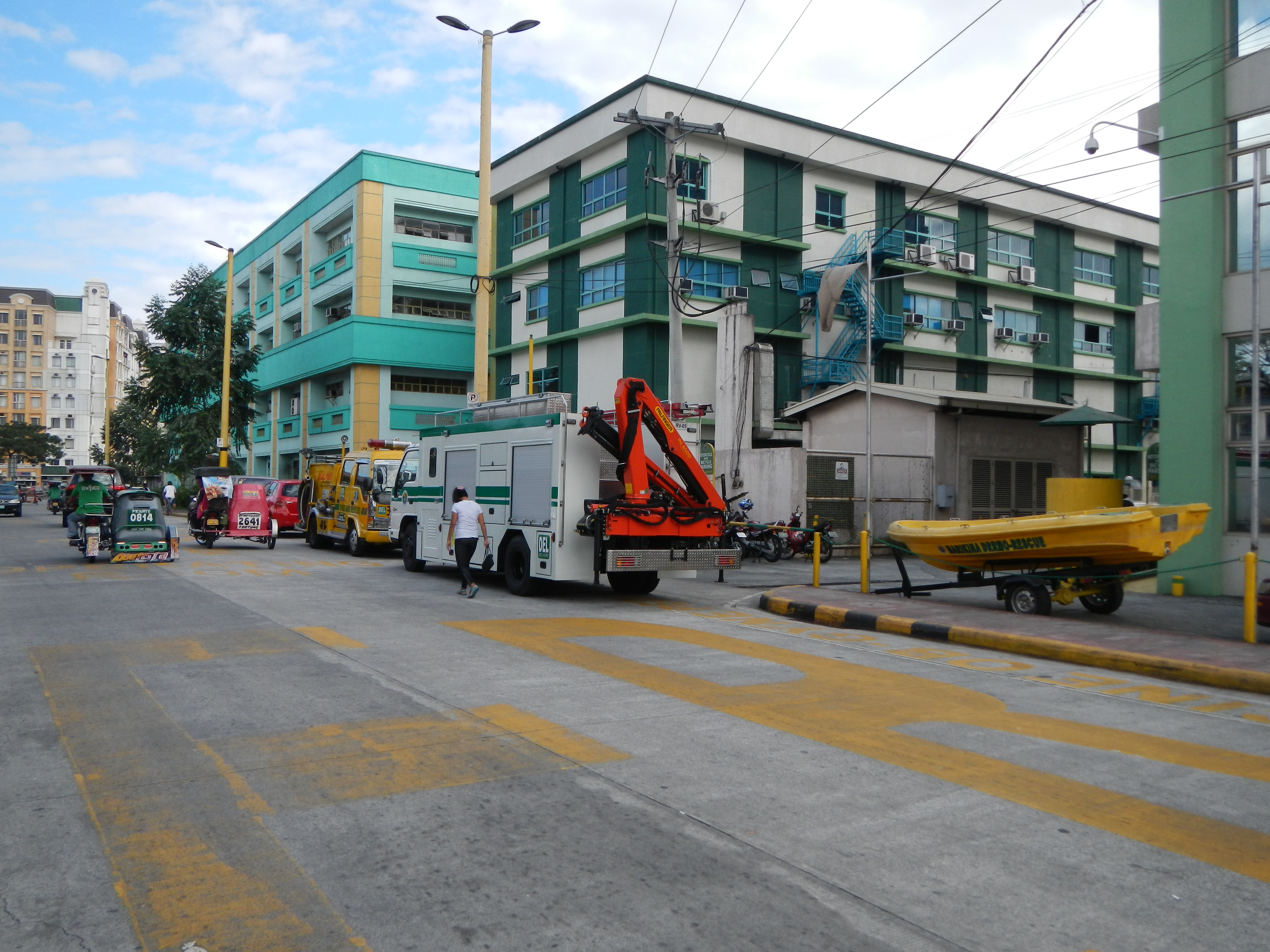
Emergency Operation Center

Marikina Rescue 161 is a 24-hour emergency service that responds to all calls within the city for assistance during emergency situations within 5 minutes. The office also conducts seminars and training on first aid among its staff to upgrade skills, especially since Marikina is vulnerable to calamities like floods, fire, and earthquakes.

Marikina Police Station is responsible for law enforcement, under the Eastern Police District (EPD) of National Capital Region Police Office (NCRPO) of the Philippine National Police (PNP).

Marikina Fire Department provides fire and emergency services under the Bureau of Fire Protection - National Capital Region (BFP-NCR) Fire District IV (frequently referred to as the PAMAMARISAN or East District area: Pasig, Mandaluyong, Marikina, San Juan, and Taguig).

=== Water and sewage ===
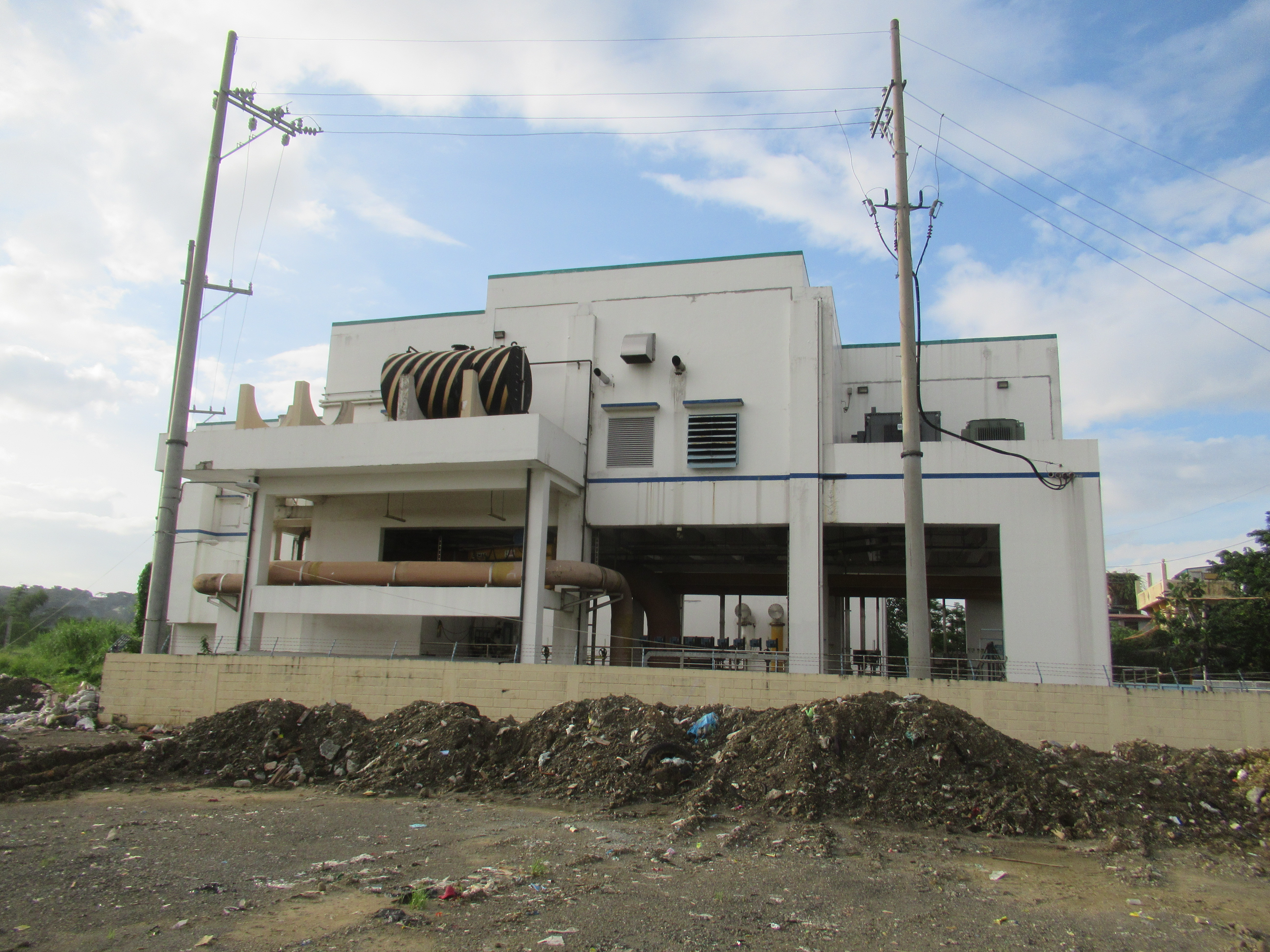
Marikina North Sewage Treatment Plant

Water in Marikina is provided by Manila Water, which also serves eastern Metro Manila and Rizal Province. It is one of the two concessionaires that provide water to Metro Manila in the Philippines; the other one is Maynilad Water Services, which serves western and southern Metro Manila.

The Marikina North Sewage Treatment Plant is a project of Manila Water Company at the Balubad Resettlement Area, it is the largest sewage treatment plant in the Philippines, processing millions of liters of used water daily. The other one is the Olandes Sewage Treatment Plant located at the southern portion of the city at Industrial Valley Complex. Both sewage treatment plants in Marikina cover the city and the nearby cities.

=== Telecommunication ===
The majority of the landline connections are provided by the phone carrier Philippine Long Distance Telephone Company. Mobile telecommunication services are mostly provided by Globe Telecom, Smart Communications, and Dito Telecommunity.

=== Electricity ===
The sole distributor of electricity in Metro Manila is the Manila Electric Company.

=== Broadcasting ===
Marikina had its own radio station before, Radyo Marikina, a community station owned and operated by the city government since its first air date in October 1992. It is considered the first local government radio station in the Philippines. Its frequency is 1674 kHz in Metro Manila. The studio is located at the Public Information Office on the second floor of Marikina City Hall. The station is no longer operational and permanently off-air and defunct since 2019.

The PMCC 4th Watch, a religious group with headquarters in this city, owns and supervises Life TV and Life Radio. Their studios are located at the NCLC Building in Barangay Santo Niño. Life TV broadcasts through BEAM TV nationwide digital television broadcast, on UHF Channel 50 and SkyCable channel 44.

== Education ==
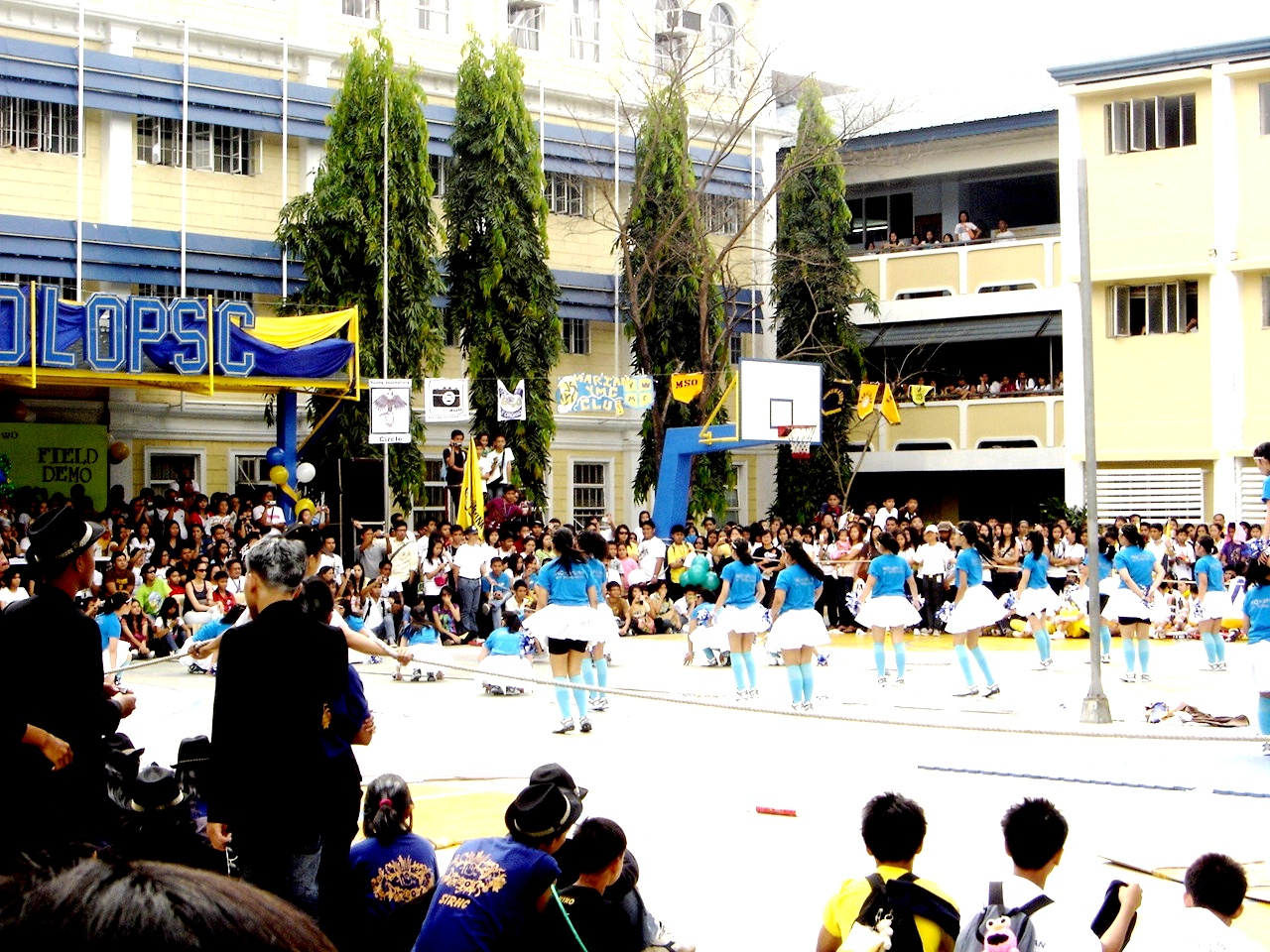
OLOPSC Quadrangle

Pamantasan ng Lungsod ng Marikina (PLMar) is the first city government-funded university to offer different courses, while Marikina Polytechnic College (MPC) is a city-state technical college that offers mostly technical courses; both are government-owned institutions. Another is FEU Roosevelt Marikina, a prominent college institution, is a private non-sectarian college named in honor of the American president Franklin D. Roosevelt and it is considered as the oldest academic institution in eastern Metro Manila.

Sectarian schools also offer college courses, including Mother of Divine Providence School, National Christian Life College, and Our Lady of Perpetual Succor College (OLOPSC). Numerous information technology and computer colleges are also opening campuses in the city. Technical Education and Skills Development Authority (TESDA), located near the city hall, manages and supervises technical education and skills development in the city.

Marikina Science High School building

Marikina Science High School (MSHS) is Marikina's first city public science high school, with a science and robotics laboratory built in 2024.

Marikina Catholic School is a private sectarian institution, and it is considered the city's center of Catholic education, located in Our Lady of the Abandoned Parish complex. Manila Boystown Complex is a Manila city government-owned institution, the facility is exclusively for abandoned, forgotten, and voluntarily surrendered children, teenagers, and senior citizens.

Preschools, daycare centers, and numerous private schools for elementary and high school are scattered all over the city, including Ingenium School, Charis School, and Infant Jesus Academy Marikina. Exclusive schools such as Marist School and St. Scholastica's Academy are also found in the city.

Each barangay in Marikina has at least one public primary or one public secondary school. A total of 17 public primary schools and 13 public secondary schools in the city are under the supervision of Department of Education's Division of City Schools Marikina.

=== Public secondary schools ===
Marikina has several public secondary schools administered by the Department of Education – Division of Marikina City. These schools are distributed across the city’s sixteen barangays and provide free basic education to residents.

School	Barangay	Description
Marikina Science High School	Sta. Elena / Kalumpang	Premier public science high school operated by the Division of Marikina City.
Sta. Elena High School	Sta. Elena	Public secondary school serving students from the city’s heritage district.
Barangka National High School	Barangka	Serves students from the Barangka area and nearby river communities.
Concepcion Integrated School (Secondary Level)	Concepcion Uno	Offers both elementary and secondary education under one administration.
Fortune High School	Fortune	Serves the easternmost barangay of Marikina, offering junior and senior high school education.
Jesus Dela Peña National High School	Jesus Dela Peña	Among the city’s earliest public high schools, located near the Marikina River.
Kalumpang National High School	Kalumpang	Serves the northern barangay of Kalumpang and adjacent areas.
Malanday National High School	Malanday	Large secondary school serving northern Marikina communities.
Marikina Heights National High School	Marikina Heights	Provides education to students in the hilly residential area of Marikina Heights.
Marikina High School	Concepcion Uno	One of the oldest and largest public high schools in the city.
Nangka High School	Nangka	Serves the border area between Marikina and San Mateo, Rizal.
Parang High School	Parang	Public high school located in the western part of Marikina.
San Roque National High School	San Roque	Centrally located, serving the urban core of the city.
SSS Village National High School	SSS Village	Provides secondary education for residents of SSS Village and nearby barangays.
Sto. Niño National High School	Sto. Niño	Serves students in the downtown and commercial district.
Tañong High School	Tañong	Located near the Marikina River; serves riverside and urban communities.

== Sister cities ==
=== International ===
- Brampton, Ontario, Canada (2005)
- Pendleton, Oregon, United States (1971)
- Sakai, Ibaraki, Japan (2017)
- Yeongdo, Busan, South Korea (2012)

=== Local ===
- (Philippines) Alaminos, Pangasinan
- (Philippines) Bacolod, Negros Occidental (1997)
- (Philippines) Davao City, Davao Region
- (Philippines) Iloilo City, Iloilo

== Notable personalities ==
- Agot Isidro, actress, singer
- Angel Aquino, actress, fashion model, television personality
- April Boy Regino, singer, songwriter, actor
- Ara Mina, actress, singer, endorser, entrepreneur
- Andi Eigenmann, former actress, model, social media influencer
- Adrian Ayalin, news reporter, news anchor
- Bassilyo, rapper, singer, songwriter
- Bayani Fernando, businessman, mechanical engineer, politician,
- Cristine Reyes, actress, reality show contestant
- Del de Guzman, politician
- Elise Estrada, Filipino-Canadian pop singer, songwriter
- Erika Padilla, actress, television host, model, sideline reporter
- Emmanuel Bautista, commanding general, Chief of Staff
- Gerald Anderson, actor, model, dancer, basketball player
- Hero Angeles, actor, reality show winner
- Jason Sabio, soccer player
- Jeffrey Hidalgo, actor, singer, songwriter, entrepreneur
- Jericho Rosales, actor, singer, songwriter and film producer
- John Lloyd Cruz, actor, matinee idol
- John Manalo, actor, model, former child star
- Jona Viray, singer, songwriter, reality singing competition winner
- Julia Barretto, actress, commercial model, entrepreneur
- Kim Rodriguez, actress, model
- Koko Pimentel, politician, senator, senate president
- Marcelino Teodoro, lawyer, politician
- Marck Espejo, volleyball athlete
- Maria Rosario Vergeire, physician, public health official
- Marides Fernando, politician
- Maan Teodoro, teacher, politician
- Mike Tan, actor, dancer, model
- Pancho Magno, actor
- Raimund Marasigan, singer, record producer
- Rhea Santos, broadcast journalist, television presenter
- Rich Asuncion, actress, reality show contestant, beauty pageant contestant
- Lito Legaspi, actor
- Ruru Madrid, actor, singer, model, television host
- Dustine Mayores, streamer, model, reality show contestant
- Salvador Panelo, lawyer, politician
- Sonny Parsons, actor, singer, director, politician
- Stella Quimbo, academic teacher, economist, politician
- Tado Jimenez, comedian, actor, radio personality, businessman, author, activist
- Zeny Zabala, veteran actress

== See also ==
- List of barangays in Marikina
- List of landmarks and attractions in Marikina
- List of city and municipality nicknames in the Philippines
- List of renamed cities and municipalities in the Philippines

== Notes ==
Preceded by Manila	Capital of Manila; 1898–1899	Succeeded by Manila
