= 2022 Marikina local elections =

9th City elections in Marikina

- May 9, 2022
- Registered: 260,749
- Turnout: 87.92% ▲13.9 pp
- Mayoral election
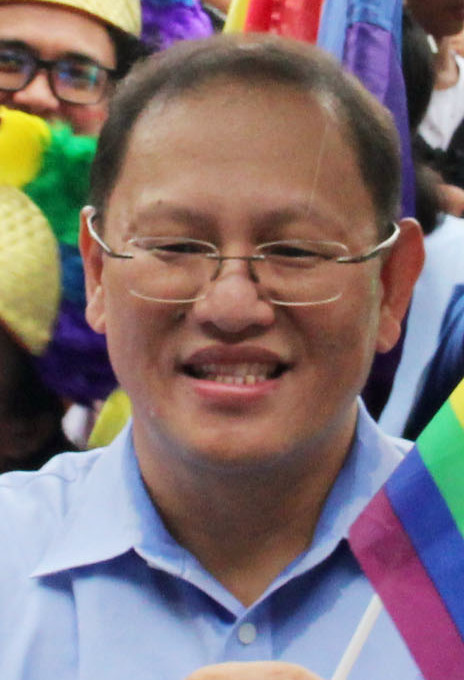

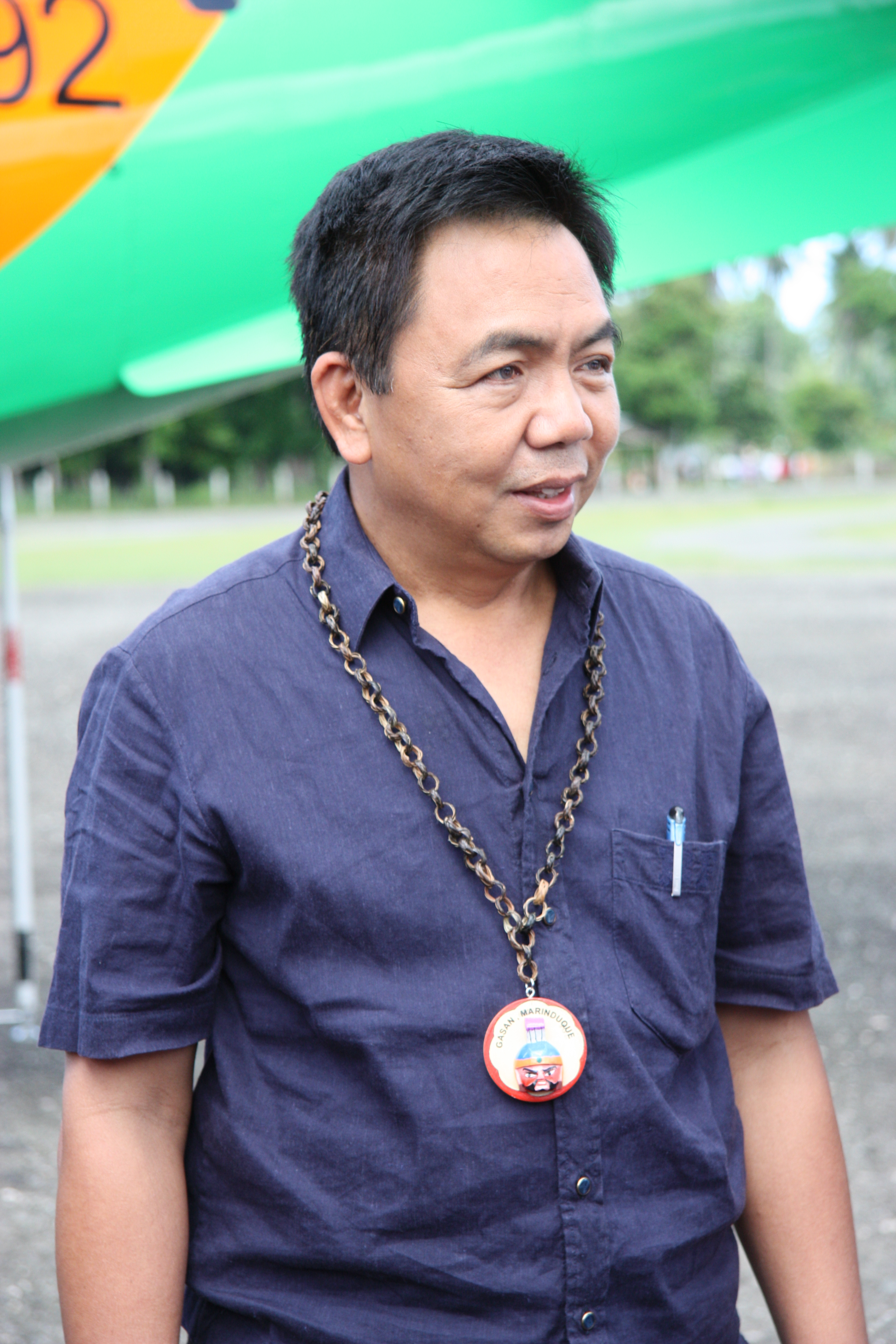
Candidate	Marcelino Teodoro	Bayani Fernando
Party	UNA	NPC
Alliance	Team MarCy	Team BF
Running mate	Marion Andres	Ziffred Ancheta
Popular vote	183,878	40,149
Percentage	82.07%	17.92%
Mayor before election
Marcelino Teodoro
UNA
Elected mayor
Marcelino Teodoro
UNA
- Vice mayoral election
Candidate	Marion Andres	Ziffred Ancheta
Party	UNA	PFP
Alliance	Team MarCy	Team BF
Popular vote	147,869	59,237
Percentage	69.94%	28.01%
Vice mayor before election
Marion Andres
UNA
Elected Vice mayor
Marion Andres
UNA
- City Council election

16 of 18 seats in the Marikina City Council 10 seats needed for a majority
	First party	Second party	Third party
Party	UNA	Liberal	NPC
Alliance	Team MarCy	Team Performance	Team BF
Last election	Did not participate	4 seats, 22.89%	5 seats, 29.43%
Seats won	14	2	0
Seat change	▲14	▼2	▼5
Popular vote	812,567	248,432	213,429
Percentage	55.04%	16.83%	14.46%

Local elections were held in Marikina on May 9, 2022, as part of the Philippine general election. Held concurrently with the national elections, the electorate voted to elect a mayor, a vice mayor, sixteen city council members, and two district representatives to congress. Those elected took their respective offices on June 30, 2022, for a three-year-long term.

Incumbents Marcelino Teodoro and Marion Andres were reelected to the mayoralty and the vice mayoralty respectively, both winning with wide margins against their closest opponents, former mayor and incumbent representative Bayani Fernando, and Tumana barangay captain Ziffred Ancheta, respectively. The United Nationalist Alliance under Team MarCy won 14 seats in the city council, while the primary opposition coalition, Team BF failed to win any seats. The only other party to win a seat in the city council was the Liberal Party, which won two seats.

Maan Teodoro and Stella Quimbo were elected as the representatives for the first and second districts respectively, with the former being elected for her first term and the latter being reelected for her second. Teodoro's election and Quimbo's reelection marked the first time both Marikina seats were held by women.

== Background ==
In the 2019 elections, Marcelino Teodoro was reelected to a second term as mayor without any opposition. His running mate, Marion Andres, was elected to his first term as vice mayor under Teodoro after defeating two other candidates.

During the passage of Typhoon Ulysses in November 2020, the Marikina River surpassed the water levels brought by Tropical Storm Ondoy in 2009, resulting in flooding throughout the city. As a result of the floods and losses, Teodoro declared a state of calamity in the city.

Later that year, Teodoro submitted a complaint to the Department of Environment and Natural Resources against BFCT, a construction firm owned by the family of Bayani Fernando. Teodoro claimed that the flooding caused by the passage of Typhoon Ulysses was a result of the construction firm's land reclamation project along the Marikina river. Fernando denied Teodoro's claims, commenting that the flooding was the result of the narrowing of the river and the construction of the Manalo Bridge. The department would ultimately approve Teodoro's request to remove the reclaimed land, culminating in his ouster from the Nationalist People's Coalition. Teodoro and his allies would later migrate to the United Nationalist Alliance.

== Campaign ==
The campaign period for local elections started on March 25, 2022. During the campaign period, the candidates and coalitions held motorcades, rallies and house-to-house campaigns.

=== Platforms ===
Marcelino Teodoro's platform focused on the city's recovery from the COVD-19 pandemic. It sought to improve the public healthcare infrastructure, conduct a safe return to in-person classes, and to continue the welfare programs enacted by his administration. Teodoro also aimed to unite the city amid the pandemic. Marion Andres, his running mate, expressed his plans of establishing a "physical health center", if reelected.

Bayani Fernando, Teodoro's opponent promised to solve the city's flooding problems, improve the city's infrastructure, and continue the policies he had enacted in his previous tenures as mayor and as MMDA chairman. In an interview with OneNewsPH, Fernando expressed regret in endorsing Teodoro in earlier races, calling it a mistake.

== Coalitions ==
As the mayor, vice mayor and the members of the city council are elected on the same ballot, mayoral candidates may present or endorse a slate of city council candidates. These slates usually run with their respective mayoral and Vice mayoral candidates along with the other members of their slate. A group of candidates independent of any mayoral or vice mayoral candidate may also form a slate consisting of themselves. Underlined candidates indicate incumbents seeking reelection.

=== Administration coalition ===
Team MarCy (MARikina CitY)
#	Name	Party
For mayor
2.	Marcelino Teodoro	UNA
For vice mayor
3.	Marion Andres	UNA
For House of Representatives (1st district)
2.	Marjorie Ann Teodoro	UNA
For City Council (1st district)
2.	Rommel Acuña	UNA
3.	Carl Africa	UNA
5.	Jojo Banzon	UNA
6.	Bodjie Bernardino	UNA
9.	Cloyd Casimiro	UNA
12.	Kate De Guzman	UNA
15.	Samuel Ferriol	UNA
20.	Manny Sarmiento	UNA
For City Council (2nd district)
6.	Marife Dayao	UNA
8.	Levy De Guzman	UNA
11.	Donn Carlo Favis	UNA
19.	Angelito Nuñez	UNA
21.	Larry Punzalan	UNA
27.	Elvis Tolentino	UNA

=== Primary opposition coalition ===
Team BF (Bayani Fernando)
#	Name	Party
For mayor
1.	Bayani Fernando	NPC
For vice mayor
2.	Ziffred Ancheta	PFP
For House of Representatives (1st district)
1.	Jose Miguel Cadiz (Note: Jose Fabian Cadiz was initially selected as Team BF's candidate for representative of Marikina's 1st congressional district, but died on February 20, 2022.)	NPC
For City Council (1st district)
1.	Kevin Abergas	NPC
4.	Eva Aguirre-Paz	NPC
8.	Leanor Carlos	NPC
10.	Willie Chavez	NPC
13.	Mario De Leon	NPC
14.	Igmidio Ferrer	NPC
17.	Celeste Reyes	NPC
18.	Vic Tambuli Sabiniano	PPM
For City Council (2nd district)
2.	Edwin Adigue	NPC
14.	Ricky Khoo	PFP
20.	Ronald Ortiz	NPC
22.	George Raymund Quimzon	NPC

=== Other coalitions ===
Team Performance (Liberal Party)
#	Name	Party
For House of Representatives (2nd district)
4.	Stella Quimbo	Liberal
For City Council (2nd district)
1.	Ronnie Acuña	Liberal
15.	Randy Leal	Liberal
16.	Bong Magtubo	Liberal
23.	Joel Relleve	Liberal
25.	Belinda Sto. Domingo	Liberal

Team Del (Aksyon Demokratiko)
#	Name	Party
For House of Representatives (2nd district)
2.	Del De Guzman	Aksyon
For City Council (2nd district)
9.	Mark Albert Del Rosario	Aksyon
10.	Xyza Diazen-Santos	Aksyon
12.	Ernesto Flores	Aksyon

PDP-Laban
#	Name	Party
For City Council (1st district)
11.	Imee De Guzman-Yu	PDP–Laban
16.	Philip Marco	PDP–Laban

=== Independents not in coalitions ===
#	Name	Party
For City Council (1st district)
7.	Noly Bernardo	Independent
19.	Isko Salvador	Independent
For City Council (2nd district)
3.	Moy Balingit	Independent
5.	Akiko Lynne Centeno	Independent
13.	Pedro Gler Jr.	Independent
17.	James Marshall	Independent
18.	Christian Daryl Mirabueno	Independent
24.	Elmer Se	Independent
26.	Ricky Tica	Independent

=== Non-independents not in coalitions ===
#	Name	Party
For vice mayor
1.	Francis Joseph Acop	PPM
4.	Sherwin Dela Cruz	Aksyon
For House of Representatives (2nd district)
1.	Mauro Arce	KBL
For City Council (2nd district)
4.	Romeo Bartolome	PPM
7.	Jobert De Guzman	PRP

== Mayoral election ==
The incumbent mayor was Marcelino Teodoro, who was reelected in 2019 without any opposition. Teodoro ran for reelection for a third term as mayor.

Teodoro's sole opponent was incumbent representative Bayani Fernando, who previously held the seat from 1992 to 2001. Fernando and Teodoro were generally viewed as allies, with Fernando's endorsement of Teodoro in the 2016 mayoral race being noted as a factor of the latter's election to the mayoralty. The alliance between the two soured following the onslaught of Typhoon Ulysses, with media outlets such as The Manila Times describing the race as a "bitter rivalry". Both candidates filed their certificates of candidacy on October 5, 2021.

=== Candidates ===
- Bayani Fernando (NPC), incumbent representative for the first district (2016–2022), former mayor of Marikina (1992–2001), and former MMDA chairman (2002–2009)
- Marcelino Teodoro (UNA), incumbent mayor of Marikina (2016–present), and former representative for the first district (2007–2016)

=== Opinion polling ===
Graphical summary for mayoral polls

Fieldwork Date(s)	Pollster	Sample Size	MoE	Fernando NPC	Teodoro UNA	Und./ None
May 9	Election Results	224,027	—	17.92	82.07	—
Apr 25–28	Publicus Asia	100	±10.00%	27	57	16
Apr 17–21	RPMDinc	—	—	38	58	4
Apr 8–13	Publicus Asia	100	±10.00%	28	60	12
March 25	Start of campaign period for local candidates					
Mar 15–22	RPMDinc	—	—	43	56	1
Mar 16–21	Publicus Asia	100	±10.00%	25	60	15
Feb 22–28	RPMDinc	—	—	42	57	1
Feb 18–24	Publicus Asia	100	±10.00%	23	62	14
February 8	Start of campaign period for national candidates					
Jan 22–30	RPMDinc	—	—	44	55	1
2022
Dec 16–23	RPMDinc	—	—	43	52	5
Nov 16–24	RPMDinc	850	±2.53%	41	48	11

=== Results ===
Results per barangay according to ER returns

Teodoro won by a landslide, winning in all 16 barangays. Fernando failed to carry his home barangay of Industrial Valley.

2022 Marikina mayoral election
Candidate	Party	Votes	%
Marcelino Teodoro	United Nationalist Alliance	183,878	82.08
Bayani Fernando	Nationalist People's Coalition	40,149	17.92
Total		224,027	100.00
Valid votes		224,027	97.81
Invalid/blank votes		5,016	2.19
Total votes		229,043	100.00
Registered voters/turnout		260,749	87.84
UNA hold			

Popular vote percentage
Teodoro	82.08%
Fernando	17.92%

==== Per Barangay ====
Barangay	Teodoro		Fernando		Ref.
Barangay	Votes	%	Votes	%	Ref.
Barangka	8,291	84.21	1,555	15.79	
Calumpang	7,259	78.96	1,934	21.04	
Concepcion Uno	16,461	82.79	3,421	17.21	
Concepcion Dos	9,765	79.29	2,550	20.71	
Fortune	15,669	87.57	2,225	12.43	
Industrial Valley	6,527	79.81	1,651	20.19	
Jesus de la Peña	4,775	76.97	1,429	23.03	
Malanday	20,938	76.3	6,502	23.7	
Marikina Heights	13,683	81.07	3,194	18.93	
Nangka	17,368	85.38	2,973	14.62	
Parang	14,944	84.39	2,765	15.61	
San Roque	8,867	84.26	1,657	15.74	
Santa Elena	3,830	81.63	862	18.37	
Santo Niño	12,798	81.17	2,968	18.83	
Tañong	5,023	80.59	1,210	19.41	
Tumana	17,680	84.46	3,253	15.54	
Total	183,878	82.08	40,149	17.92	

== Vice mayoral election ==
The incumbent vice mayor was Marion Andres, who was elected in 2019 with 61.98% of the vote. Andres sought a second (fifth nonconsecutive) term as Vice mayor.

Andres previously served three terms as vice mayor under Marides Fernando, the wife of mayoral candidate Bayani Fernando; he previously ran for the mayoralty in 2010, where he lost to Del De Guzman. Team BF, the main opposition coalition slated Tumana Barangay Captain Ziffred Ancheta to run against Andres. Ancheta previously faced charges for the dissemination of false information during the early stages of the COVID-19 pandemic.

=== Candidates ===
- Francis Joseph Acop (PPM)
- Ziffred Ancheta (PFP), Barangay captain of Tumana (2010–present)
- Marion Andres (UNA), incumbent vice mayor of Marikina (2001–2010; 2019–present), and candidate for mayor in 2010
- Sherwin Dela Cruz (Aksyon)

=== Opinion polling ===
Graphical summary for Vice mayoral polls

Fieldwork Date(s)	Pollster	Sample Size	MoE	Acop PPM	Ancheta PFP	Andres UNA	Dela Cruz Aksyon	Und./ None
May 9	Election Results	211,410	—	0.71	28.01	69.94	1.31	—
Apr 25–28	Publicus Asia	100	±10.00%	7	13	39	15	9
Apr 8–13	Publicus Asia	100	±10.00%	9	22	30	18	21
March 25	Start of campaign period for local candidates							
Mar 16–21	Publicus Asia	100	±10.00%	14	10	32	16	27
February 20	Congressional candidate Jose Fabian Cadiz dies; Migoy Cadiz named as substitute							
Feb 18–24	Publicus Asia	100	±10.00%	4	16	39	5	36

=== Results ===
Results per barangay according to ER returns

Like his running mate, Andres was reelected in a landslide victory, winning in all 16 barangays. Ancheta failed to carry her home barangay of Tumana, where she is barangay captain; although the barangay did give her best electoral performance.

2022 Marikina vice mayoral election
Candidate	Party	Votes	%
Marion Andres	United Nationalist Alliance	147,869	69.94
Ziffred Ancheta	Partido Federal ng Pilipinas	59,237	28.02
Sherwin Dela Cruz	Aksyon Demokratiko	2,786	1.32
Francis Joseph Acop	Partido Pederal ng Maharlika	1,518	0.72
Total		211,410	100.00
Valid votes		211,410	92.30
Invalid/blank votes		17,633	7.70
Total votes		229,043	100.00
Registered voters/turnout		260,749	87.84
UNA hold			

Popular vote percentage
Andres	69.94%
Ancheta	28.02%
Others	2.04%

==== Per barangay ====
Barangay	Andres		Ancheta		Dela Cruz		Acop	
Barangay	Votes	%	Votes	%	Votes	%	Votes	%
Barangka	6,703	73.47	2,261	24.78	107	1.17	53	0.58
Calumpang	6,211	71.89	2,287	26.47	85	0.98	56	0.65
Concepcion Uno	13,874	73.0	4,715	24.81	299	1.57	117	0.62
Concepcion Dos	8,809	75.3	2,488	21.27	264	2.26	137	1.17
Fortune	11,819	68.96	4,991	29.12	194	1.13	136	0.79
Industrial Valley	5,532	74.11	1,730	23.17	125	1.67	78	1.04
Jesus de la Peña	4,130	71.76	1,538	26.72	59	1.03	28	0.49
Malanday	16,823	66.16	8,096	31.84	292	1.15	215	0.85
Marikina Heights	11,089	69.37	4,495	28.12	278	1.74	124	0.78
Nangka	12,821	66.13	6,189	31.92	265	1.37	112	0.58
Parang	12,331	73.26	4,167	24.76	240	1.43	93	0.55
San Roque	7,609	77.69	1,980	20.22	117	1.19	88	0.9
Santa Elena	3,305	76.31	945	21.82	46	1.06	35	0.81
Santo Niño	10,664	72.96	3,647	24.95	172	1.18	133	0.91
Tañong	4,281	73.95	1,403	24.24	58	1	47	0.81
Tumana	11,868	58.11	8,305	40.66	185	0.91	66	0.32
Total	147,869	69.94	59,237	28.02	2,786	1.32	1,518	0.72

== House of Representatives elections ==
Coinciding with the local elections, two representatives from the city's two congressional districts were elected to represent their respective districts in the House of Representatives. In the 2019 elections, Bayani Fernando and Stella Quimbo were elected to represent the first and second districts respectively. Both representatives are in the minority bloc in the 18th Congress.

Summary of the 2022 Philippine House of Representatives Elections in Marikina
Party	Coalitions	Candidates	Seats Before	Seats Won	Seat Change	Votes	Percentage
Liberal Party	Team Performance	1	1	1	1	103,108	44.97%
United Nationalist Alliance	Team MarCy	1	0	1	▲1	68,572	29.91%
Nationalist People's Coalition	Team BF	1	1	0	▼1	24,584	10.72%
Aksyon Demokratiko	Team Del	1	0	0	1	20,674	9.02%
Kilusang Bagong Lipunan	–	1	0	0	1	894	0.39%
Valid Votes						217,832	95.01%
Invalid or Blank Votes						11,435	4.99%
Total						229,267	100.00%

=== First district ===
2022 Marikina's 1st congressional district election
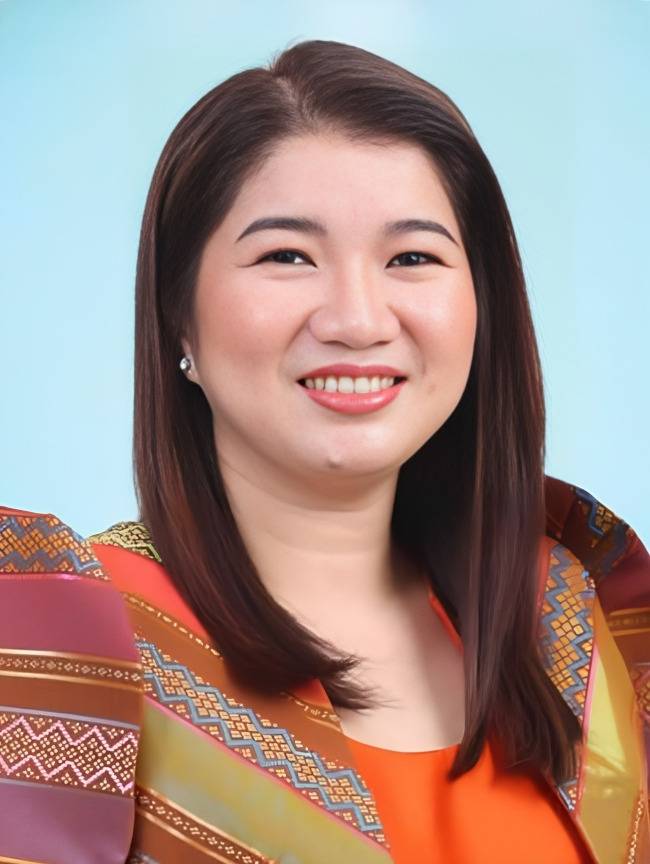

Candidate	Marjorie Ann Teodoro	Jose Miguel Cadiz
Party	UNA	NPC
Alliance	Team MarCy (local)	Alliances: Reporma–NPC (national); Team BF (local)
Popular vote	68,572	24,584
Percentage	73.61%	26.39%
- Resulrs of the election per ER Returns.
Philippine Representative before election
Bayani Fernando
NPC
Elected Philippine Representative
Marjorie Ann Teodoro
UNA

The first district covers the barangays of Barangka, Calumpang, Industrial Valley Complex, Jesus de la Peña, Malanday, San Roque, Santa Elena, Santo Niño and Tañong. The incumbent representative was Bayani Fernando, who was reelected in 2019 with 80.46% of the vote. Fernando is eligible for reelection but has opted to run for mayor, rather than a third term as a representative.

Fernando's party, the Nationalist People's Coalition nominated former vice mayor Jose Fabian Cadiz in his place. Cadiz had previously run for the seat in 2019 but eventually withdrew. On the other hand, the United Nationalist Alliance under Team MarCy nominated the first lady of Marikina, Marjorie Ann Teodoro to challenge Cadiz for the seat. Three months before the election, Cadiz died from cardiac arrest. As a result, his party named his nephew, Jose Miguel Cadiz, as their substitute candidate.

==== Candidates ====
- Jose Miguel Cadiz (NPC), nephew of Jose Fabian Cadiz.
- Marjorie Ann Teodoro (UNA), teacher, and wife of Marcelino Teodoro.

===== Deceased =====
- Jose Fabian Cadiz (NPC), former vice mayor of Marikina (2010–2019) (died February 20)

==== Opinion polling ====
Fieldwork Date(s)	Pollster	Sample Size	MoE	J.M. Cadiz NPC	Teodoro UNA	Und./ None
May 9	Election Results	93,156	—	26.39	73.61	—
Apr 17–21	RPMDinc	—	—	32	56	12

==== Results ====
Like her husband in the mayoral race, Teodoro defeated Cadiz in a wide margin, winning in all nine barangays within the district. Her win, along with Quimbo's in the neighboring district, marked the first time both congressional seats in Marikina were held by women.

2022 Philippine House of Representatives election in Marikina's 1st district
Candidate	Party	Votes	%
Marjorie Ann Teodoro	United Nationalist Alliance	68,572	73.61
Jose Miguel Cadiz	Nationalist People's Coalition	24,584	26.39
Total		93,156	100.00
Valid votes		93,156	93.75
Invalid/blank votes		6,210	6.25
Total votes		99,366	100.00
Registered voters/turnout		114,298	86.94
UNA gain from NPC			

Popular vote percentage
Teodoro	73.61%
Cadiz	26.39%

===== Per barangay =====
Barangay	Teodoro		Cadiz	
Barangay	Votes	%	Votes	%
Barangka	7,327	78.0	2,067	22.0
Calumpang	6,595	75.45	2,146	24.55
Industrial Valley	5,730	74.08	2,005	25.92
Jesus de la Peña	4,171	71.25	1,683	28.75
Malanday	18,790	71.92	7,336	28.08
San Roque	7,293	72.84	2,720	27.16
Santa Elena	3,238	72.93	1,202	27.07
Santo Niño	10,909	73.17	4,001	26.83
Tañong	4,519	76.04	1,424	23.96
Total	68,572	73.61	24,584	26.39

=== Second district ===
2022 Marikina's 2nd congressional district election
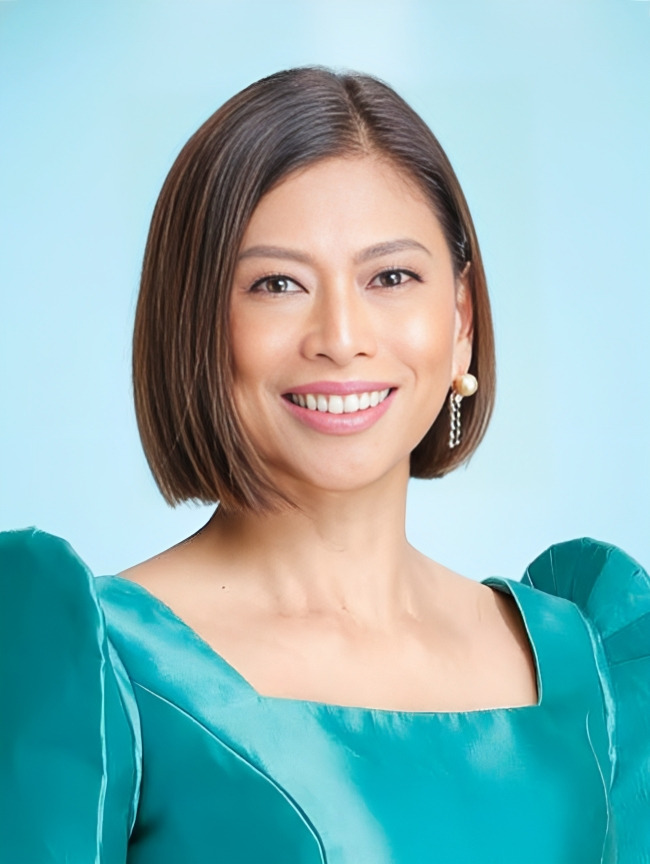

Candidate	Stella Quimbo	Del de Guzman
Party	Liberal	Aksyon
Alliance	Alliances: TroPa (national); Team Performance (local)	Alliances: Team Bilis Kilos (national); Team Del (local)
Popular vote	103,108	20,674
Percentage	82.71%	16.58%
- Results of the election per ER Returns.
Philippine Representative before election
Stella Quimbo
Liberal
Elected Philippine Representative
Stella Quimbo
Liberal

The second district covers the barangays of Concepcion Uno, Concepcion Dos, Fortune, Marikina Heights, Parang, Nangka and Tumana. The incumbent representative was Stella Quimbo, who was elected in 2019 with 83.74% of the vote. Quimbo sought reelection for a second term as representative.

Quimbo faced a challenge from former mayor Del de Guzman, who had previously held this seat from 2007 to 2010.

==== Candidates ====
- Mauro Arce (KBL), candidate for representative in 2019
- Del de Guzman (Aksyon), former mayor of Marikina (2010–2016), former representative for the at-large district, later second district (2001–2010)
- Stella Quimbo (Liberal), incumbent representative (2019–present)

==== Opinion polling ====
Fieldwork Date(s)	Pollster	Sample Size	MoE	Arce KBL	De Guzman Aksyon	Quimbo Liberal	Und./ None
May 9	Election Results	124,676	—	0.72	16.58	82.70	—
Apr 17–21	RPMDinc	—	—	3	37	54	6
Mar 25 – Apr 4	PRSC	—	—	4	11	81	4

==== Results ====
Quimbo handily defeated de Guzman in his bid to reenter the House of Representatives, winning in all seven barangays within the district.

2022 Philippine House of Representatives election in Marikina's 2nd district
Candidate	Party	Votes	%
Stella Quimbo	Liberal Party	103,108	82.70
Del de Guzman	Aksyon Demokratiko	20,674	16.58
Mauro Arce	Kilusang Bagong Lipunan	894	0.72
Total		124,676	100.00
Valid votes		124,676	96.14
Invalid/blank votes		5,001	3.86
Total votes		129,677	100.00
Registered voters/turnout		146,451	88.55
Liberal hold			

Popular vote percentage
Quimbo	82.70%
de Guzman	16.58%
Arce	0.72%

===== Per barangay =====
Barangay	Quimbo		de Guzman		Arce	
Barangay	Votes	%	Votes	%	Votes	%
Concepcion Uno	15,226	77.63	4,211	21.47	177	0.9
Concepcion Dos	9,906	81.51	2,090	17.2	157	1.29
Fortune	14,936	83.66	2,842	15.92	75	0.42
Marikina Heights	13,524	81.28	3,001	18.04	113	0.68
Nangka	16,894	83.51	3,228	15.96	107	0.53
Parang	14,540	82.87	2,867	16.34	138	0.79
Tumana	18,082	87.59	2,435	11.8	127	0.62
Total	103,108	82.70	20,674	16.58	894	0.72

== City Council election ==
Results per district

The city council is composed of 18 members, 16 of which are elected to serve three-year terms. The sixteen seats are equally divided between the city's councilor districts, which are derived from the congressional districts. Each district has its own set of candidates, with the eight candidates with the most votes per district being elected to the council.

=== Overall results ===
Team MarCy successfully retained their majority in the City Council, with every candidate under the coalition being elected to the council. The Liberal Party under Team Performance was the only other party to win any seats in the election. Meanwhile, the primary opposition coalition, Team BF failed to win any seats.

Of the twelve councilors running for reelection, all but one retained their seat in the council; Joel Relleve from the second district was defeated in his reelection bid. Four were newly elected to the council, them being former councilors Jojo Banzon from the first district and Ronnie Acuña from the second district, Marife Dayao from the second district, and Larry Punzalan from the second district; Acuña, who previously served as a first district councilor, transferred his residence to Brgy. Marikina Heights in order to qualify as a candidate in the second district. Former councilors Eva Aguirre-Paz, Vic "Tambuli" Sabinano and Xyza Diazen-Santos were defeated in their bids to re-enter the council.

Party or alliance		Votes	%	Seats
United Nationalist Alliance		812,567	55.04	14
Liberal Party		248,432	16.83	2
Team BF	Nationalist People's Coalition	213,429	14.46	0
Team BF	Partido Federal ng Pilipinas	12,389	0.84	0
Team BF	Partido Pederal ng Maharlika	12,373	0.84	0
Team BF	Total	238,191	16.13	0
Aksyon Demokratiko		70,222	4.76	0
Partido Demokratiko Pilipino-Lakas ng Bayan		25,945	1.76	0
People's Reform Party		8,007	0.54	0
Partido Pederal ng Maharlika		2,523	0.17	0
Independents		70,536	4.78	0
Ex officio seats				2
Total		1,476,423	100.00	18

Vote share
UNA	55.04%
Liberal	16.83%
Team BF	16.13%
Others	12.01%

City Council seats
UNA	87.5%
Liberal	12.5%
Team BF	0%
Others	0%

=== First district ===
The first district is coextensive with the first congressional district.

==== Results ====
===== Per candidate =====
Marikina Council Election – First district
Party	Candidate	Votes	%
UNA	Samuel Ferriol (incumbent)	68,517	68.88
UNA	Kate De Guzman (incumbent)	60,036	60.35
UNA	Carl Africa (incumbent)	59,135	59.45
UNA	Rommel Acuña (incumbent)	55,854	56.15
UNA	Manny Sarmiento (incumbent)	51,381	51.65
UNA	Bodjie Bernardino (incumbent)	50,493	50.76
UNA	Cloyd Casimiro (incumbent)	48,999	49.26
UNA	Jojo Banzon	44,884	45.12
NPC	Celeste Reyes	37,685	37.88
NPC	Igmidio Ferrer	28,740	28.89
NPC	Eva Aguirre-Paz	25,246	25.38
NPC	Leanor Carlos	22,117	22.23
PDP–Laban	Imelda "Imee" De Guzman-Yu	21,119	21.23
NPC	Mario De Leon	20,025	20.13
NPC	Willie Chavez	14,720	14.80
NPC	Kevin Abergas	14,170	14.24
PPM	Vic Tambuli Sabiniano	12,373	12.44
Independent	Herman "Brod Pete" Salvador	8,740	8.79
Independent	Noly Bernardo	7,121	7.16
PDP–Laban	Philip Marco	4,826	4.85
Total votes		656,181	100.00%

===== Per coalition =====
Party or alliance		Votes	%	Seats
United Nationalist Alliance		439,299	66.95	8
Team BF	Nationalist People's Coalition	162,703	24.80	0
Team BF	Partido Pederal ng Maharlika	12,373	1.89	0
Team BF	Total	175,076	26.68	0
Partido Demokratiko Pilipino-Lakas ng Bayan		25,945	3.95	0
Independents		15,861	2.42	0
Total		656,181	100.00	8

=== Second district ===
The second district is coextensive with the second congressional district.

==== Per candidate ====
Marikina Council Election – Second district
Party	Candidate	Votes	%
UNA	Donn Carlo Favis (incumbent)	75,635	58.27
UNA	Angelito Nuñez (incumbent)	67,425	51.95
UNA	Coach Elvis Tolentino (incumbent)	67,425	51.95
Liberal	Ronnie "Kambal" Acuña	57,584	44.37
UNA	Levy De Guzman (incumbent)	56,139	43.25
UNA	Marife Dayao	54,707	42.15
Liberal	Bong Magtubo (incumbent)	52,616	40.54
UNA	Larry Punzalan	51,937	40.02
Liberal	Randy Leal	49,096	37.83
Liberal	Joel Relleve (incumbent)	48,456	37.33
Liberal	Belinda Sto. Domingo	40,680	31.34
Aksyon	Xyza Diazen-Santos	27,611	21.27
Independent	Akiko Lynne Centeno	25,570	19.70
Aksyon	Mark Albert Del Rosario	24,716	19.04
NPC	Ronald Ortiz	19,250	14.83
Aksyon	Ernesto "Erning" Flores	17,895	13.79
NPC	Edwin Adigue	16,434	12.66
NPC	George Raymund Quimzon	15,042	11.59
Independent	James Marshall	14,494	11.17
PFP	Heinrich "Ricky" Khoo	12,389	9.55
PRP	Jobert De Guzman	8,007	6.17
Independent	Elmer Se	3,978	3.06
Independent	Zosimo "Moy" Balingit	3,744	2.88
Independent	Pedro Gler Jr.	2,862	2.21
PPM	Romeo "Romy" Bartolome	2,523	1.94
Independent	Christian Daryl Mirabueno	2,151	1.66
Independent	Eriberto "Ricky" Tica	1,876	1.45
Total votes		820,242	100.00%

==== Per coalition ====
Party or alliance		Votes	%	Seats
United Nationalist Alliance		373,268	44.64	6
Liberal Party		248,432	29.71	2
Aksyon Demokratiko		70,222	8.40	0
Team BF	Nationalist People's Coalition	50,726	6.07	0
Team BF	Partido Federal ng Pilipinas	12,373	1.48	0
Team BF	Total	63,115	7.55	0
People's Reform Party		8,007	0.96	0
Partido Pederal ng Maharlika		2,523	0.30	0
Independents		70,536	8.44	0
Total		836,087	100.00	8
