= Mayor of Marikina =

Local chief executive of Marikina, Philippines

- Punong Lungsod ng Marikina
- Flag of Marikina

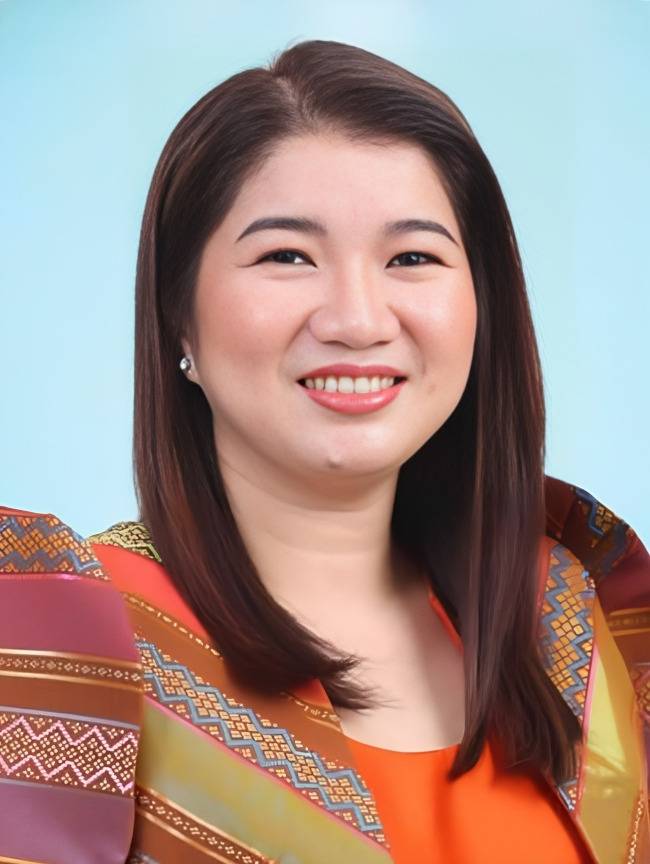
- Incumbent; Maan Teodoro since June 30, 2025
- Local Government of Marikina
- Style: The Honorable (formal)
- Member of: Metro Manila Council
- Seat: Marikina City Hall, Santa Elena, Marikina
- Appointer: Direct popular vote or by succession from the vice mayoralty
- Term length: Three years, renewable twice, not eligible for re-election immediately after three consecutive terms
- Inaugural holder: Claudio Cruz
- Formation: 1861
- Deputy: Vice Mayor of Marikina
- Website: marikina.gov.ph

The mayor of Marikina (Filipino: Punong Lungsod ng Marikina; also referred to as Alkalde ng Marikina) is the head of the local government of Marikina, a highly urbanized city in Metro Manila, Philippines. The mayor oversees the implementation of city ordinances and the delivery of public services. As a chief executive from the region, the mayor also serves as a voting member of the Metro Manila Council.

Like all local government heads in the Philippines, the mayor is directly elected through popular vote for a term of three years. The mayor is limited to three terms but may pursue a succeeding term after a break of one term. In case of death, resignation, or incapacity, the vice mayor assumes the office. In all, 25 individuals have served as mayor of Marikina since 1867, including six acting mayors.

The incumbent mayor is Maan Teodoro, who was sworn in on June 30, 2025. She is serving her first term as the chief executive, having been elected in 2025. She is the second woman to hold the position, after Marides Fernando, who served from 2001 to 2010.

== History ==
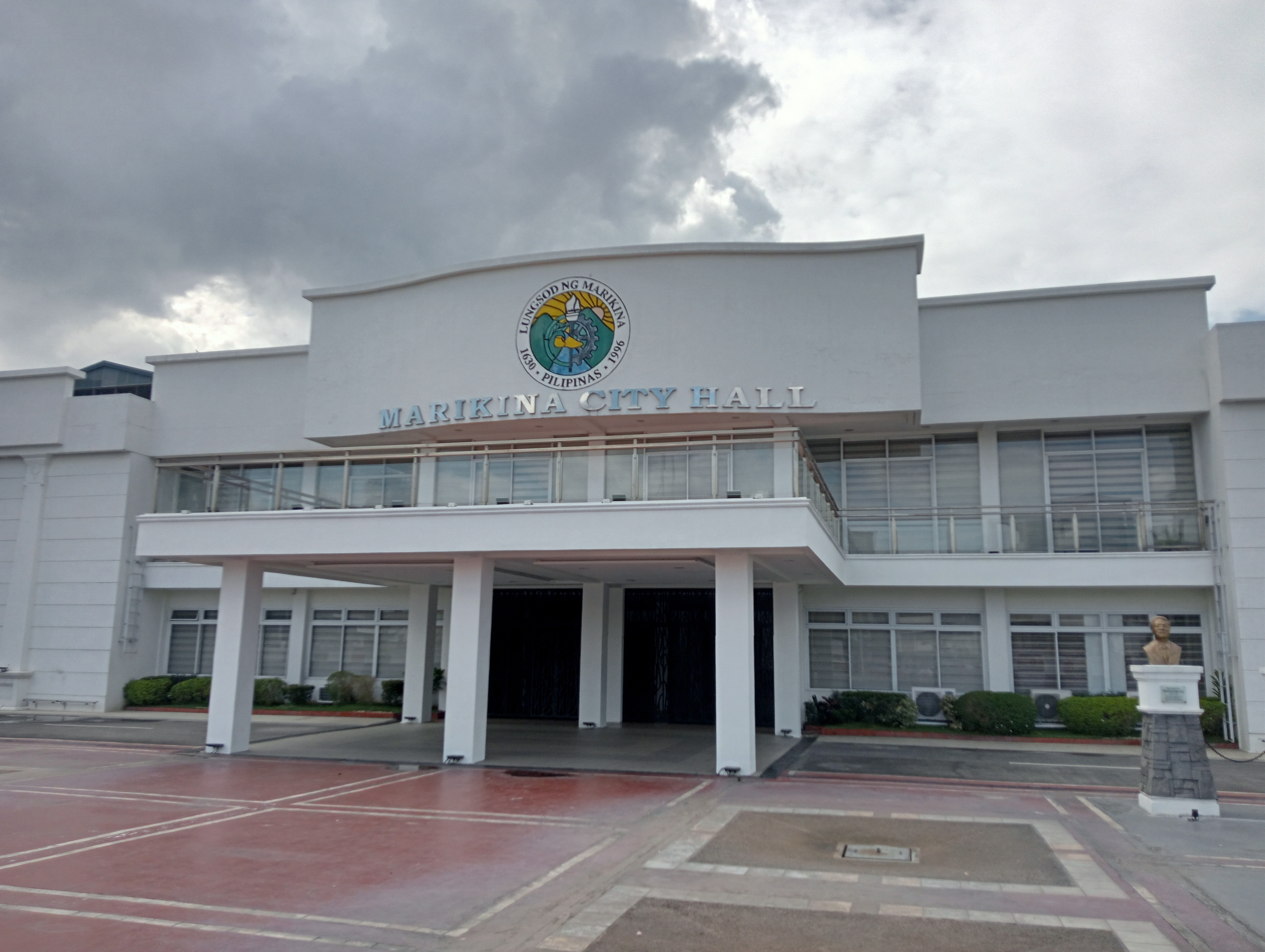
The Marikina City Hall (pictured in 2023), in Santa Elena, the seat of the mayor

Marikina was founded as Jesus dela Peña (lit. 'Jesus of the Rocks') by the Jesuits in 1630 and went on to be populated as a town. The Spanish colonial government declared the locality a pueblo in 1787 and renamed it Mariquina. During the American occupation, the First Philippine Commission localized the municipality's name to "Marikina" and declared it a component of the newly formed province of Rizal.

In 1959, Osmundo de Guzman was elected mayor, beginning a 27-year-long mayoralty which went on to be the longest in Marikina's history. During his tenure, the municipality was incorporated into the National Capital Region in 1975 through a presidential decree.

De Guzman's tenure ended in 1986, after President Corazon Aquino ordered all local government heads to resign from their posts as part of reorganization efforts following the People Power Revolution. Several caretakers then administered Marikina as officers-in-charge, including former mayor de Guzman, Guillermo Flores, Alfonso Salvador, and Rodolfo B. Valentino. Valentino himself would be elected mayor in 1988 before losing reelection in 1992 to Bayani Fernando. Cityhood efforts began during the Fernando mayoralty, during which he and Representative Romeo Candazo coordinated in successfully pursuing legislation calling for a cityhood plebiscite that voted in favor of converting Marikina into a highly urbanized city.

After Fernando left office, his wife, Marides, succeeded him, continuing many of his policies until her third term ended in 2010. Del de Guzman defeated their preferred candidate, Marion Andres, and went on to institute a "gentler" style of governance in contrast to their nearly two decades in office.

Marcelino Teodoro defeated de Guzman in his 2013 reelection campaign and went on to be reelected twice. In March 2025, during his final term, the Office of the Ombudsman suspended Teodoro and members of his administration for six months in response to allegations of misusing PhilHealth funds under his mayoralty. As a result, the Department of the Interior and Local Government appointed Rommel Acuña as acting mayor. Teodoro maintained his popularity during his suspension, which contributed to the election of his wife, Maan, as mayor.

== List of mayors ==
Political parties

Liberal
Nacionalista
GA
KBL
PDP–LnB
Lakas
Bagumbayan
NPC
UNA
NUP
Party unknown

List of mayors of Marikina
No.	Image	Mayor	Term in office	Party	Election	Vice Mayor
1		Claudio Cruz	1861 – 1861	Unknown	—	Unknown
2		Vivencio Cruz	1889 – 1889	Unknown	—	Unknown
3		Remigio Victorino	1893 – 1894	Unknown	—	Unknown
4		Domingo Victoriano	1895 – 1896	Unknown	—	Unknown
5		Vicente Gomez	1900 – 1903	Unknown	—	Unknown
(4)		Domingo Victoriano	1904 – 1905	Unknown	—	Unknown
5		Ceferino Legazpi	1908 – 1909	Unknown	—	Unknown
6		Isabello Mendoza	1910 – 1911	Unknown	—	Unknown
7		Catalino Cruz	1912 – 1918	Unknown	—	Unknown
8		Jesus Villalon	1918 – 1928	Unknown	—	Unknown
9		Wenceslao C. de la Paz	1933 – 1938	Unknown	—	Unknown
–		Juan Chanyungco; Acting	1938 – 1945	Unknown	—	Unknown
10		Enrique de la Paz	1945 – 1946	Unknown	—	Unknown
–		Gil Fernando (1905–2001); Acting	December 1, 1946 – December 30, 1947	Liberal	—	Unknown
11		Gil Fernando (1905–2001)	December 30, 1947 – December 30, 1951	Liberal	1947	Unknown
12		Juan Chanyungco	December 30, 1951 – December 30, 1955	Nacionalista	1951	Unknown
(11)		Gil Fernando (1905–2001)	December 30, 1955 – December 30, 1959	Liberal	1955	Unknown
13		Osmundo S. de Guzman	December 30, 1959 – 1986	GA (1959–61)	1959 1963 1967 1971 1980	Jose S. Andres (1959–1967)
13		Osmundo S. de Guzman	December 30, 1959 – 1986	Nacionalista (1961–1978)	1959 1963 1967 1971 1980	Jose S. Andres (1959–1967)
13		Osmundo S. de Guzman	December 30, 1959 – 1986	Nacionalista (1961–1978)	1959 1963 1967 1971 1980	Manuel T. Santos (1967–1971)
13		Osmundo S. de Guzman	December 30, 1959 – 1986	Nacionalista (1961–1978)	1959 1963 1967 1971 1980	Nonong Molina Jr. (1971–1980)
13		Osmundo S. de Guzman	December 30, 1959 – 1986	KBL (1978–1986)	1959 1963 1967 1971 1980	Nonong Molina Jr. (1971–1980)
13		Osmundo S. de Guzman	December 30, 1959 – 1986	KBL (1978–1986)	1959 1963 1967 1971 1980	Teofisto R. Santos (1980–1986)
–		Teofisto R. Santos; Acting	1986	Unknown	— (Note: Appointed by the Department of Local Government.)	Unknown
–		Rodolfo B. Valentino; Acting	April 1986 – December 1, 1987	Unknown	—	Alfonso D. Salvador
–		Guillermo S. Flores; Acting	December 1, 1987 – 1988	Unknown	— (Note: Appointed by the Department of Local Government after the Valentino ran in the 1988 Marikina local elections.)	Osmundo de Guzman Jr.
14		Rodolfo B. Valentino	1988 – June 30, 1992 (lost re-election)	PDP–LnB	1988	Doy Del Castillo
15		Bayani Fernando (1946–2023)	June 30, 1992 – June 30, 2001 (term-limited)	Lakas	1992 1995 1998	Del de Guzman
16		Marides Fernando (born 1957)	June 30, 2001 – June 30, 2010 (term-limited)	Lakas (2001–09)	2001 2004 2007	Marion Andres
16		Marides Fernando (born 1957)	June 30, 2001 – June 30, 2010 (term-limited)	Bagumbayan (2009–10)	2001 2004 2007	Marion Andres
17		Del de Guzman (born 1963)	June 30, 2010 – June 30, 2016 (lost re-election)	Liberal	2010 2013	Jose Fabian Cadiz (2010–2019)
18		Marcelino Teodoro (born 1970)	June 30, 2016 – June 30, 2025 (term-limited) (Note: Powers and duties were suspended from March 25, 2025.)	NPC (2016–17)	2016 2019 2022	Jose Fabian Cadiz (2010–2019)
18		Marcelino Teodoro (born 1970)	June 30, 2016 – June 30, 2025 (term-limited)	PDP–Laban (2017–21)	2016 2019 2022	Marion Andres (2019–2025)
18		Marcelino Teodoro (born 1970)	June 30, 2016 – June 30, 2025 (term-limited)	UNA (2021–24)	2016 2019 2022	Marion Andres (2019–2025)
18		Marcelino Teodoro (born 1970)	June 30, 2016 – June 30, 2025 (term-limited)	NUP (2024–25)	2016 2019 2022	Marion Andres (2019–2025)
–		Rommel Acuña (born 1973); Acting	March 26, 2025 – June 30, 2025 (Interim mayoralty ended)	Lakas	— (Note: Appointed by the Department of the Interior and Local Government after Teodoro was preventively suspended for six months, beginning on March 25, 2025.)	Ronnie Acuña; Acting
19		Maan Teodoro (born 1981)	June 30, 2025 – Incumbent	NUP	2025	Del de Guzman

== Post-mayoralty ==
After leaving office, several mayors remained active in politics.

- Bayani Fernando was appointed as the chairperson of the Metropolitan Manila Development Authority by President Gloria Macapagal Arroyo on June 5, 2002. During his tenure as chairman, he concurrently served in her cabinet as the 35th secretary of public works and highways from January 15 to April 15, 2003. In 2010, he ran for vice president as the running mate of Dick Gordon, and lost, placing fourth. He was later elected to the House of Representatives in 2016 as the representative for the first district. He sought a return to the mayoralty in 2022 and lost to incumbent mayor Marcelino Teodoro.
- Del de Guzman sought a return to the House of Representatives in 2022 and lost to incumbent representative Stella Quimbo. When Quimbo ran for mayor in the 2025 Marikina local elections, he ran as her running mate and was elected vice mayor.
- Marcelino Teodoro was elected as the representative for the first district in 2025. While his proclamation as representative was suspended by the Commission of Elections, he was later allowed to sit as a representative after the commission reversed a division's earlier decision to cancel his candidacy for the seat.

== See also ==
- List of mayors in Metro Manila
