= 2013 Marikina local elections =

6th City elections in Marikina

2013 Marikina mayoral elections
| ← 2010 | May 13, 2013 | 2016 → |
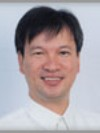
| Nominee | Del De Guzman | Felipe Evangelista | Rizal Tenorio |
| Party | Liberal | Independent | Independent |
| Running mate | Jose Fabian Cadiz |
| Popular vote | 124,387 | 2,964 | 1,384 |
| Percentage | 96.62 | 2.30 | 1.08 |
Mayor before election
Del De Guzman
Liberal
Elected mayor
Del De Guzman
Liberal
- Vice mayoral election
| Candidate | Jose Fabian Cadiz | Marion Andres |
| Party | Liberal | Independent |
| Popular vote | 78,018 | 54,869 |
| Percentage | 58.71% | 41.29% |
Vice Mayor before election
Jose Fabian Cadiz
Liberal
Elected Vice Mayor
Jose Fabian Cadiz
Liberal

Local elections were held in Marikina on May 13, 2013 as part of the general election. The voters elected one mayor, one vice mayor, two congressional representatives, and sixteen councilors, eight per district.

== Background ==
Mayor Del De Guzman was on his first term, and he ran for re-election for second term. He was challenged by independent candidates Felipe Evangelista and Rizal Tenorio.

Vice Mayor Jose Fabian Cadiz was on his first term, and he ran for re-election for second term. He faced his predecessor, former Vice Mayor and defeated 2010 mayoral candidate Marion Andres.

First District Rep. Marcelino "Marcy" Teodoro was on his second term, and he ran for re-election for third term unopposed.

Second District Rep. Romero Federico "Miro" Quimbo was on his first term, and he ran for re-election for second term. He was challenged by independent candidate Albert Bocobo.

== Results ==
=== For Representatives ===
==== First District ====
Rep. Marcelino "Marcy" Teodoro won unopposed.

Congressional Elections in Marikina's First District
| Party | Candidate | Votes | % |
|---|---|---|---|
| Liberal | Marcelino "Marcy" Teodoro | 58,123 | 100.00 |
| Total votes | | 58,123 | 100.00 |
| Liberal hold | | | |

==== Second District ====
Rep. Romero Federico "Miro" Quimbo won the elections.

Congressional Elections in Marikina's Second District
| Party | Candidate | Votes | % |
|---|---|---|---|
| Liberal | Romero Federico "Miro" Quimbo | 67,406 | 95.10 |
| Independent | Albert Bocobo | 3,476 | 4.90 |
| Total votes | | 70,882 | 100.00 |
| Liberal hold | | | |

=== For Mayor ===
Mayor Del De Guzman won the elections.

Marikina Mayoral Elections
| Party | Candidate | Votes | % |
|---|---|---|---|
| Liberal | Del De Guzman | 124,387 | 96.62 |
| Independent | Felipe Evangelista | 2,964 | 2.30 |
| Independent | Rizal Tenorio | 1,384 | 1.08 |
| Total votes | | 128,375 | 100.00 |
| Liberal hold | | | |

=== For Vice Mayor ===
Vice Mayor Jose Fabian Cadiz defeated his predecessor, former Vice Mayor Marion Andres.

Marikina Vice Mayoral Elections
| Party | Candidate | Votes | % |
|---|---|---|---|
| Liberal | Jose Fabian Cadiz | 78,018 | 58.71 |
| Independent | Marion Andres | 54,869 | 41.29 |
| Total votes | | 132,887 | 100.00 |
| Liberal hold | | | |

=== For City Councilors ===
==== First District ====
City Council Elections in Marikina's First District
| Party | Candidate | Votes | % |
|---|---|---|---|
| Liberal | Samuel Ferriol | 46,309 | 11.71 |
| Liberal | Eva Aguirre-Paz | 38,657 | 9.78 |
| Liberal | Joseph "Jojo" Banzon | 35,276 | 8.92 |
| Liberal | Frankie Ayuson | 33,686 | 8.52 |
| Liberal | Thaddeus Antonio "Boy Bolok" Santos Jr. | 33,587 | 8.49 |
| Liberal | Mario De Leon | 32,519 | 8.22 |
| Liberal | Ronnie Acuña | 32,155 | 8.13 |
| Liberal | Willie Chavez | 30,416 | 7.69 |
| NPC | Ferdinand "Ferdie" Marco | 27,457 | 6.94 |
| PMP | Elmer "Nepo" Nepomuceno | 24,966 | 6.32 |
| PLM | Arvin "Tado" Jimenez | 21,210 | 5.36 |
| CDP | Ama Almocera | 19,877 | 5.03 |
| PMP | Reginaldo Reyes | 16,484 | 4.17 |
| Independent | Stephen Ang | 2,786 | 0.70 |
| Total votes | | 64,910 | 100.00 |

==== Second District ====
City Council Elections in Marikina's Second District
| Party | Candidate | Votes | % |
|---|---|---|---|
| Liberal | Ruben "Bogs" Reyes | 44,216 | 9.27 |
| Liberal | Xyza "Xhy" Diazen | 42,463 | 8.90 |
| Liberal | Paul Dayao | 41,749 | 8.75 |
| Liberal | Ernesto Flores | 39,880 | 8.36 |
| Liberal | Mark Albert Del Rosario | 38,556 | 8.08 |
| Liberal | Ariel Cuaresma | 36,227 | 7.59 |
| Liberal | Susana "Judy" Magtubo | 34,607 | 7.26 |
| PMP | Rommel "Jojo" Ortiz | 30,568 | 6.41 |
| Liberal | Ferdinand Sayasa | 28,311 | 5.94 |
| PMP | Hilario Punzalan | 20,795 | 4.36 |
| Nacionalista | Emmanuel Jude Dayao | 13,670 | 2.87 |
| Independent | Vilma Macasaquit-Santos | 12,409 | 2.60 |
| Independent | Celso Candazo | 11,866 | 2.49 |
| Independent | Perfecto Dazo | 11,013 | 2.31 |
| PMP | Wilfredo "Fred" Amacio | 10,889 | 2.28 |
| Makabayan | Karen Javier | 9,714 | 2.04 |
| Independent | Arturo Sunga | 9,291 | 1.95 |
| PMP | Felizardo Bulaong | 8,741 | 1.83 |
| PMP | Allan Requilman | 6,478 | 1.36 |
| PLM | Gilbert Sunggayan | 5,719 | 1.20 |
| Independent | Joel "Weng" Tatad | 4,459 | 0.93 |
| MDP | Aurelio Caparas | 4,386 | 0.92 |
| Independent | Marilyn "Lhen" Gabriel | 3,110 | 0.65 |
| MDP | Lamberto Ramos Jr. | 2,756 | 0.58 |
| Independent | Rodolfo Pascual | 2,673 | 0.56 |
| Independent | Jose Bandol | 2,446 | 0.51 |
| Total votes | | 76,109 | 100.00 |
