= 2010 Marikina local elections =

5th City elections in Marikina

2010 Marikina mayoral elections
- May 10, 2010
- Turnout: 72.72%
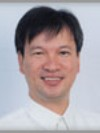

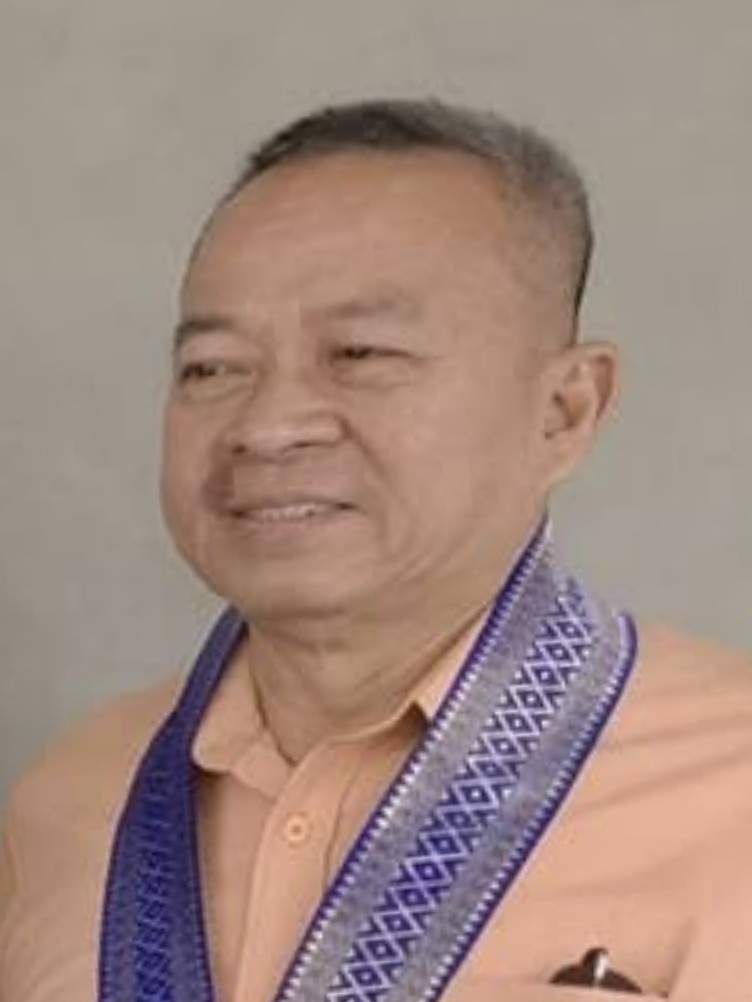
Nominee	Del De Guzman	Marion Andres	Alfredo Cheng
Party	Liberal	Bagumbayan	Lakas–Kampi
Running mate	Jose Fabian Cadiz	Thaddeus Santos Jr.	Efren Angeles
Popular vote	101,495	35,162	16,035
Percentage	66.34%	22.98%	10.48%
Mayor before election
Marides Fernando
Bagumbayan
Elected mayor
Del De Guzman
Liberal

Local elections were held in Marikina on May 10, 2010 as part of that year's Philippine general election. In this election, the mayoralty and vice mayoralty were contested, along with the sixteen seats in the city council and the city's two seats in the House of Representatives.

Vice Mayor Marion Andres was defeated by the Liberal representative from the second district Del De Guzman. Andres's running mate, Thaddeus Santos Jr. was also defeated in his race with Jose Fabian Cadiz being elected as vice mayor. First district representative and future mayor Marcelino Teodoro was reelected to a second term as the representative for the first district, with Miro Quimbo being elected as the representative for the second district.

The election determined the composition of the sixth city council.

The candidates for mayor and vice mayor with the highest number of votes wins the seat; they are voted separately, therefore, they may be of different parties when elected.

== Background ==
Mayor Maria Lourdes "Marides" Fernando was on her third term, and she was term-limited. Her party chose Vice Mayor Marion Andres to run in her place. Andres was challenged by Rep. Del De Guzman of the Liberal Party, Alfredo Cheng of Lakas, and independent candidate John Alexander Chong.

Vice Mayor Marion Andres was on his third term, and he was term-limited. He ran as mayor instead. His party chose First District Councilor Thaddeus Antonio "Boy Bolok" Santos Jr. to run in his place. Santos was challenged by former First District Councilor Jose Fabian Cadiz, First District Councilor Ferdinand "Ferdie" Marco, Efren Angeles, and Melencia Majerano.

First District Rep. Marcelino "Marcy" Teodoro was on his first term, and he ran for re-election for second term. He faced First District Councilor Samuel "Sam" Ferriol of LP, Garizaldy Dela Paz of Lakas, and independent candidates Alfredo Fajardo and Daniel Casuga.

Second District Rep. Del De Guzman was on his third term, and he was term-limited. He ran as mayor instead. He fielded lawyer Romero "Miro" Quimbo to run in his place. Quimbo faced Second District Councilor Donn Carlo "Don" Favis, former Rep. Romeo "Ome" Candazo, Second District Councilor Hilario Punzalan, Adjuthor De Guzman, Eduardo Francisco, Benjamin Baretto, Rogelio Serrano, and Felizardo Bulaong.

== Results ==
=== For Mayor ===
Second District Rep. Del De Guzman defeated his closest opponent Vice Mayor Marion Andres with a margin of 66,333 votes.

Marikina Mayoral Elections
Party	Candidate	Votes	%
Liberal	Del De Guzman	101,495	66.34
Bagumbayan	Marion Andres	35,162	22.98
Lakas–Kampi	Alfredo Cheng	16,035	10.48
Independent	John Alexander Chong	306	0.20
Total votes		152,998	100.00
Liberal hold			

=== For Vice Mayor ===
Former First District Councilor Jose Fabian Cadiz defeated his opponents.

Marikina Vice Mayoral Elections
Party	Candidate	Votes	%
Liberal	Jose Fabian Cadiz	84,422	57.92
Bagumbayan	Thaddeus Antonio "Boy Bolok" Santos Jr.	46,499	31.90
NPC	Ferdinand "Ferdie" Marco	9,254	6.35
Lakas	Efren Angeles	4,934	3.38
Independent	Melencia Majerano	660	0.45
Total votes		145,769	100.00
Liberal hold			

=== For Representatives ===
==== First District ====
Rep. Marcelino "Marcy" Teodoro was re-elected. He defeated his closest opponent, Councilor Samuel "Sam" Ferriol with a margin of 25,193 votes.

Congressional Elections in Marikina's First District
Party	Candidate	Votes	%
Independent	Marcelino "Marcy" Teodoro	47,425	67.48
Liberal	Samuel "Sam" Ferriol	22,232	31.63
Lakas	Garizaldy Dela Paz	338	0.48
Independent	Alfredo Fajardo	175	0.25
Independent	Daniel Casuga	110	0.16
Total votes		70,280	100.00
Independent hold			

==== Second District ====
Atty. Romero "Miro" Quimbo defeated his prominent opponents, including Councilor Donn Carlo "Don" Favis and former Rep. Romeo "Ome" Candazo, and Councilor Hilario Punzalan.

Congressional Elections in Marikina's Second District
Party	Candidate	Votes	%
Liberal	Romero "Miro" Quimbo	45,690	56.77
Bagumbayan	Donn Carlo "Don" Favis	13,073	16.24
PMP	Romeo "Ome" Candazo	10,883	13.52
Independent	Hilario Punzalan	4,744	5.89
Independent	Adjuthor De Guzman	3,704	4.60
Independent	Eduardo Francisco	1,515	1.88
Independent	Benjamin Baretto	616	0.77
Independent	Rogelio Serrano	149	0.19
Independent	Felizardo Bulaong	112	0.14
Total votes		80,486	100.00
Liberal hold			

=== Summary ===
Party	Votes	%	Seats
Liberal Party	450,449	44.91	9
Bagumbayan–VNP	382,965	38.18	6
Lakas Kampi CMD	76,309	7.61	1
Pwersa ng Masang Pilipino	18,419	1.84	0
Independent	74,786	7.46	0
Ex officio seats			2
Total	1,002,928	100.00	18
Total votes	159,486	–	

==== First District ====
City Council Elections in Marikina's First District
Party	Candidate	Votes	%
Liberal	Eva Aguirre-Paz	40,780	
Bagumbayan	Carissa Carlos	32,233	
Lakas–Kampi	Joseph "Jojo" Banzon	29,258	
Liberal	Mario De Leon	27,433	
Bagumbayan	Serafin "Bojie" Bernardino	27,073	
Liberal	Elmer "Nepo" Nepomuceno	26,511	
Bagumbayan	Frankie Ayuson	25,557	
Liberal	Ronnie Acuña	23,820	
Bagumbayan	Poncianito "Ponchie" Santos Jr.	22,888	
Liberal	Danny Del Rosario	20,822	
Independent	Arvin "Tado" Jimenez	20,589	
Liberal	Rogel Santiago	20,570	
Bagumbayan	Reginaldo Reyes	18,054	
Liberal	Mariano "Mar" Betic	17,247	
Independent	Igmidio Ferrer	15,758	
Bagumbayan	Esmela "Mel" David	15,288	
Independent	Gerald Diamante	13,809	
Bagumbayan	Roy Delgado	13,778	
Bagumbayan	Narciso "Siso" Dela Cruz Sr.	13,679	
Lakas	Alex Trinidad	7,016	
Lakas	Pedro "Jun" De Guzman Jr.	5,853	
Independent	Ninoy "Bong" Aquino	3,800	
Lakas	Al Mendoza	2,905	
Independent	Alfredo Arroyo Jr.	2,739	
Lakas	Danilo Tiu	2,324	
Independent	Arnold Aquino	1,769	
Independent	Philip Cuevas	1,731	
Independent	Emelita Sola	1,465	
Independent	Federico Estonido	747	
Independent	Ignacio Bael	727	
Total votes			100.00

==== Second District ====
City Council Elections in Marikina's Second District
Party	Candidate	Votes	%
Liberal	Mark Albert "Mark" Del Rosario	37,320	
Liberal	Xy-Za "Xhy" Diazen	35,499	
Bagumbayan	Wilfred "Boggs" Reyes	35,000	
Bagumbayan	Anna "Annie" Dayao	34,183	
Liberal	Susana "Judy" Magtubo	33,117	
Bagumbayan	Rommel "Jojo" Ortiz	32,888	
Liberal	Ariel Cuaresma	32,019	
Liberal	Ernesto Flores	31,719	
Liberal	Peter Belmonte	31,344	
Liberal	Alfonso Cruz	29,546	
Bagumbayan	Ponciano "Bong" Ubaldo Jr.	29,258	
Liberal	Rizalina "Riza" Teope	28,893	
Bagumbayan	Roberto "Boy" Ponce	28,816	
Bagumbayan	Manuel Orara	18,629	
Bagumbayan	Jaime Cruz Jr.	17,267	
Bagumbayan	Federico Ifurung	14,374	
PMP	Aurelio Caparas	7,317	
Lakas	Manuel Pangilinan	6,847	
Independent	Salvatore Caronite Jr.	5,961	
Lakas	Rodrigo Contado	5,726	
PMP	Vincent Singh	5,384	
Lakas	Fernando "Dindo" Rosales	5,052	
Independent	Feliciano Reyes	4,829	
Lakas	Solomon Fernandez	4,419	
Lakas	Wilfredo "Fred" Zamora	4,379	
PMP	Demetrio Marquez Jr.	3,784	
Independent	Dolores "Dory" Camacho	3,516	
Lakas	Andres Garalza Jr.	2,530	
PMP	Arthur Limpin	1,934	
Independent	Manuel "Manny" Miralles	1,899	
Independent	Rodolfo Pascual	1,862	
Independent	Zosimo Balingit	1,825	
Independent	Edgardo Velasquez	1,798	
Independent	Julio Antiporda	1,710	
Independent	Angel Dacalos	1,224	
Independent	Saulfred Soliquen	837	
Total votes			100.00
