= List of mayors in Metro Manila =

Metro Manila is a metropolitan area in the Philippines, consisting of 16 cities and a municipality, designated as the National Capital Region (NCR) of the country.

The mayors in Metro Manila are considered as the local chief executives of their respective localities and they also form part of the Metro Manila Council of the Metropolitan Manila Development Authority (MMDA).

== Incumbent mayors ==
City/Municipality	Name	Image	Birth date	Party	Took office	Term (Note: Consecutive terms only)	Vice Mayor	Party	Term
Caloocan (list)	Along Malapitan		October 31, 1979 (age 47)	NP	June 30, 2022	2nd	Anna Karina Teh-Limsico	NP	2nd
Las Piñas (list)	April Aguilar-Nery		April 6, 1970 (age 56)	NPC	June 30, 2025	1st	Imelda Aguilar	NPC	1st
Makati (list)	Nancy Binay		May 12, 1973 (age 53)	UNA	June 30, 2025	1st	Kid Peña	NPC	1st
Malabon (list)	Jeannie Sandoval		January 14, 1965 (age 61)	NP	June 30, 2022	2nd	Edward Nolasco	Lakas–CMD	1st
Mandaluyong (list)	Carmelita Abalos		July 2, 1962 (age 64)	PFP	June 30, 2022	1st	Anthony Suva	PFP	1st
City of Manila (list)	Isko Moreno		October 24, 1974 (age 52)	Aksyon	June 30, 2025	1st	Chi Atienza-Valdepeñas	Aksyon	1st
Marikina (list)	Maan Teodoro		January 11, 1981 (age 45)	NUP	June 30, 2025	1st	Del de Guzman	Lakas–CMD	1st
Muntinlupa (list)	Ruffy Biazon		March 20, 1969 (age 57)	1MUNTI	June 30, 2022	2nd	Phanie Teves-Wong	Independent	1st
Navotas (list)	John Rey Tiangco		November 21, 1972 (age 53)	Partido Navoteño	June 30, 2022	2nd	Tito Sanchez	Partido Navoteño	2nd
Parañaque (list)	Edwin Olivarez		August 14, 1963 (age 63)	Lakas–CMD	June 30, 2025	1st	Benjo Bernabe	PFP	1st
Pasay (list)	Imelda Calixto Rubiano		August 16, 1960 (age 66)	PFP	June 30, 2019	3rd	Mark Calixto	Lakas–CMD	1st
Pasig (list)	Vico Sotto		June 17, 1989 (age 37)	Independent	June 30, 2019	3rd	Robert Jaworski Jr.	Independent	2nd
Pateros (list)	Gerald German		September 18, 1979 (age 47)	PFP	June 30, 2025	1st	Carlo Santos	NP	2nd
Quezon City (list)	Joy Belmonte Alimurung		March 15, 1970 (age 56)	SBP	June 30, 2019	3rd	Gian Sotto	SBP	3rd
San Juan (list)	Francis Zamora		December 5, 1977 (age 48)	PFP	June 30, 2019	3rd	Angelo Agcaoili	PFP	1st (Note: First full term. Agcaoili completed Warren Villa's unfinished term from June 26, 2023, to June 30, 2025, following the latter's death.)
Taguig (list)	Lani Cayetano		December 11, 1981 (age 44)	NP	June 30, 2022	2nd	Arvin Ian Alit	NP	2nd
Valenzuela (list)	Wes Gatchalian		August 11, 1980 (age 46)	NPC	June 30, 2022	2nd	Marlon Alejandrino	NPC	1st

== Lists of mayors ==
The following is the lists of mayors of Metro Manila's 17 local government units since 1901.

=== Pateros ===
#	Mayor	Dates in Office	Notes
1	Gregorio Flores	1900–1906	
2	Julio Tangco	1907–1912	
3	Estanislao Calingo Sr.	1913–1917	
4	Simplicio Manalo	1918–1920	
5	Adriano Almeda	1921–1925	
6	Juan Sanchez	1926–1930	
7	Emiliano Almeda	1931–1934	
8	Moises Flores	1934–1940	
9	Delfin Salonga	1941–1944	
10	Melchor Menguito	1944–1945	
11	Antonino Ponce Sr.	1946–1947	
*	Moises Flores	1947–1951	
*	Antonino Ponce Sr.	1952–1959	
12	Eustacio Flores	1960–1971	
13	Nestor Ponce Sr.	1972–1979	Died in office
14	Normando Sta. Ana	1980–1986	
15	Cesar Borja	1986–1987	
*	Manuel Roxas	1987–1988	
(15)	Cesar Borja	1988–1989	Died in office
16	Jose Capco Jr.	1989–2001	
17	Rosendo Capco	2001–2007	
18	Jaime Medina	2007–2016	
19	Miguel Ponce III	2016–2025	
20	Gerald S. German	2025–present	

== See also ==
- Governor of Metro Manila
