= 2016 Marikina local elections =

7th City elections in Marikina

← 2013	May 9, 2016	2019 →
- Turnout: 83.15 ▲19.27 pp
- Mayoral election
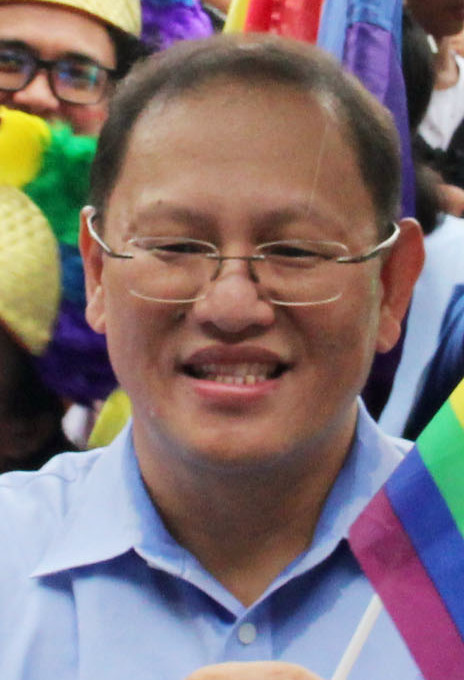

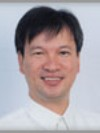
Candidate	Marcelino Teodoro	Del De Guzman
Party	NPC	Liberal
Running mate	Marion Andres	Jose Fabian Cadiz
Popular vote	90,810	85,823
Percentage	50.17%	47.14%
Mayor before election
Del De Guzman
Liberal
Elected mayor
Marcelino Teodoro
NPC
- Vice mayoral election
	Liberal	NPC
Candidate	Jose Fabian Cadiz	Marion Andres
Party	Liberal	NPC
Popular vote	99,122	69,487
Percentage	54.76%	38.39%
Vice Mayor before election
Jose Fabian Cadiz
Liberal
Elected Vice Mayor
Jose Fabian Cadiz
Liberal

Local elections were held in Marikina on May 9, 2016, as part of the Philippine general election. Held concurrently with the national elections, the electorate voted to elect a mayor, a vice mayor, sixteen city council members and two district representatives to congress. Those elected took their respective offices on June 30, 2016, for a three-year-long term. 181,019 out of 217,711 registered voters voted in this election.

Outgoing Representative Marcelino Teodoro was elected to the mayoralty, defeating incumbent mayor Del De Guzman. In a rematch for the vice mayoralty, Jose Fabian Cadiz was re-elected for a third term as mayor, defeating former vice mayor Marion Andres. The Liberal Party, despite losing the mayoralty maintained their majority in the City Council, winning 12 seats in the legislature. The Nationalist People's Coalition gained four seats in the city council.

Bayani Fernando and Miro Quimbo were elected as the representatives for the first and second districts respectively, with the former being elected for his first term and the latter being re-elected for his third.

== Background ==
In the 2013 elections, Del de Guzman and Jose Fabian Cadiz were re-elected to the mayoralty and vice mayoralty respectively.

== Mayoral election ==
The incumbent mayor is Del De Guzman, who was re-elected in 2013 with 88.21% of the vote.

De Guzman's sole opponent is the incumbent representative from the first district Marcelino Teodoro.

=== Candidates ===
- Del De Guzman (Liberal), Mayor of Marikina (2010 - 2016) Representative for the Lone District, then 2nd District (2001 - 2010)
- Marcelino Teodoro (NPC), Representative for the 1st District (2007 - 2016)

=== Results ===
Marikina mayoral election
Party	Candidate	Votes	%
NPC	Marcelino Teodoro	90,810	50.17%
Liberal	Del De Guzman (incumbent)	85,823	47.41%
Margin of victory		4,987	2.76%
Valid ballots		176,633	97.58%
Invalid or blank votes		4,386	2.42%
Total votes		181,019	100%
NPC gain from Liberal			

== Vice mayoral election ==
The incumbent vice mayor is Jose Fabian Cadiz, who was re-elected in 2013 with 55.32% of the vote.

In a rematch, Cadiz's sole opponent is former mayor Marion Andres, who had previously challenged Cadiz for the vice mayoralty in 2013.

=== Candidates ===
- Jose Fabian Cadiz (Liberal), Vice Mayor of Marikina (2010 - 2019)
- Marion Andres (NPC), Vice Mayor of Marikina (2001 - 2010)

=== Results ===
Marikina Vice Mayoral election
Party	Candidate	Votes	%
Liberal	Jose Fabian Cadiz (incumbent)	99,122	54.76%
NPC	Marion Andres	69,487	38.39%
Margin of victory		29,635	16.37%
Valid ballots		168,609	93.14%
Invalid or blank votes		12,410	6.86%
Total votes		181,019	100%
Liberal hold			

== House of Representatives elections ==
Held concurrently with the local elections, two representatives from the city's congressional districts were elected to represent their respective districts in the House of Representatives. In the 2013 elections Marcelino Teodoro and Miro Quimbo were elected to represent the first and second districts respectively. Both representatives are in the majority bloc.

2016 Philippine House of Representatives Elections in Marikina
Party	Candidates	Seats Before	Seats Won	Seat Change	Votes	Percentage
Liberal Party	2	1	1	Steady	115,534	63.82%
Nationalist People's Coalition	1	1	1	Steady	43,127	23.82%
Independents	1	0	0	Steady	3,490	1.93%
Invalid/Blank Ballots					18,868	10.42%
Total	4	2	2		181,019	100%

=== First district ===
The incumbent representative is Marcelino Teodoro, who was re-elected in 2013 with 89.54% of the vote. Teodoro is term-limited and challenged incumbent mayor Del De Guzman in the mayoral race.

Former Mayor and MMDA Chairman Bayani Fernando was nominated by Nationalist People's Coalition to run for this seat. On the other hand the Liberal Party slated Councilor Samuel Ferriol to challenge Fernando for the seat. Ipaglaban Mo! host Jopet Sison also ran for the seat as an independent candidate.

==== Candidates ====
- Bayani Fernando (NPC), Mayor of Marikina (1992 - 2001) MMDA Chairman (2002 - 2009)
- Samuel Ferriol (Liberal), Councilor for the 1st District (2010 - 2019)
- Jopet Sison (Independent), Lawyer and Ipaglaban Mo! host

==== Results ====
2016 Philippine House of Representatives election in Marikina's 1st District
Party	Candidate	Votes	%
NPC	Bayani Fernando	43,127	54.21%
Liberal	Samuel Ferriol	29,619	37.23%
Independent	Jopet Sison	3,490	4.39%
Margin of victory		13,508	16.98%
Valid ballots		76,236	95.83%
Invalid or blank votes		3,321	4.17%
Total votes		79,557	100%
NPC hold			

=== Second district ===
The incumbent representative is Miro Quimbo, who was re-elected in 2013 with 88.57% of the vote. Quimbo is running unopposed.

==== Candidate ====
- Miro Quimbo (Liberal) Incumbent Representative (2010 - 2019)

==== Results ====
2016 Philippine House of Representatives election in Marikina's 2nd District
Party	Candidate	Votes	%
Liberal	Miro Quimbo	85,915	84.68%
Invalid or blank votes		15,547	15.32%
Total votes		101,462	100%
Liberal hold			

== City Council elections ==
=== First district ===
Marikina 1st District council election
Party	Candidate	Votes	%
Liberal	Eva Aguirre-Paz	43,008	8.39%
NPC	Leanor "Lea" Carlos	40,338	7.88%
Liberal	Ronnie "Kambal" Acuña	36,678	7.16%
NPC	Serafin "Bojie" Bernardino	34,689	6.77%
Liberal	Joseph Banzon	33,422	6.52%
Liberal	Mario De Leon	32,113	6.26%
Liberal	Thaddeus Antonio "Boy Bolok" Santos Jr.	31,832	6.21%
NPC	Manny Sarmiento	31,357	6.12%
Liberal	Ferdinand "Ferdie" Marco	30,731	5.99%
Liberal	Cloyd Casimiro	28,731	5.60%
PDP–Laban	Ama Almocera	22,852	4.46%
Liberal	Willie "Manager" Chavez	22,845	4.46%
NPC	Boyet Mascariña	21,686	4.23%
NPC	Efren Lahuc-Angeles	20,243	3.95%
PDP–Laban	Kenneth Lozendo	17,924	3.49%
Independent	Celso Mendoza	17,913	3.49%
NPC	Romeo "Hugo" Cruz, Jr.	17,238	3.36%
Independent	Boyet Llabres	11,391	2.22%
Independent	Doc Uro Cruz	10,988	2.14%
Independent	Direk Andrade	3,929	0.76%
Independent	Jahn Alejaga	2,234	0.43%
Total votes		489,297	100%

=== Second district ===
Marikina 2nd District council election
Party	Candidate	Votes	%
Liberal	Paul Dayao	52,183	7.84%
Liberal	Ruben "Bogs" Reyes	52,015	7.82%
Liberal	Xyza "Xhy" Diazen-Santos	49,562	7.45%
Liberal	Levy De Guzman	47,102	7.08%
Liberal	Mark Del Rosario	46,081	6.93%
NPC	Donn Carlo Favis	46,007	6.91%
Liberal	Susana "Judy" Magtubo	41,756	6.28%
Liberal	Ernesto Flores	41,445	6.23%
Liberal	Ariel Cuaresma	41,243	6.20%
NPC	Hilario "Larry" Punzalan	30,721	4.62%
NPC	Pecho Candazo	29,707	4.46%
NPC	Erick Habijan	28,692	4.31%
NPC	Elvis Tolentino	27,583	4.14%
NPC	Anna Cruz	26,002	3.91%
NPC	Rommel Ortiz	25,677	3.86%
Independent	Tito Ortiz	24,019	3.61%
NPC	Eric De Torres	20,622	3.10%
Independent	Roberto Ponce	12,260	1.84%
PBM	Socrates Tolentino	9,953	1.49%
Independent	Paul Lardizabal	6,520	0.98%
Independent	Mark Laurence Pitero	4,123	0.62%
KBL	Dave Salac	1,623	0.24%
Total votes		664,896	100%
