= Maan Teodoro =

Filipino politician (born 1981)

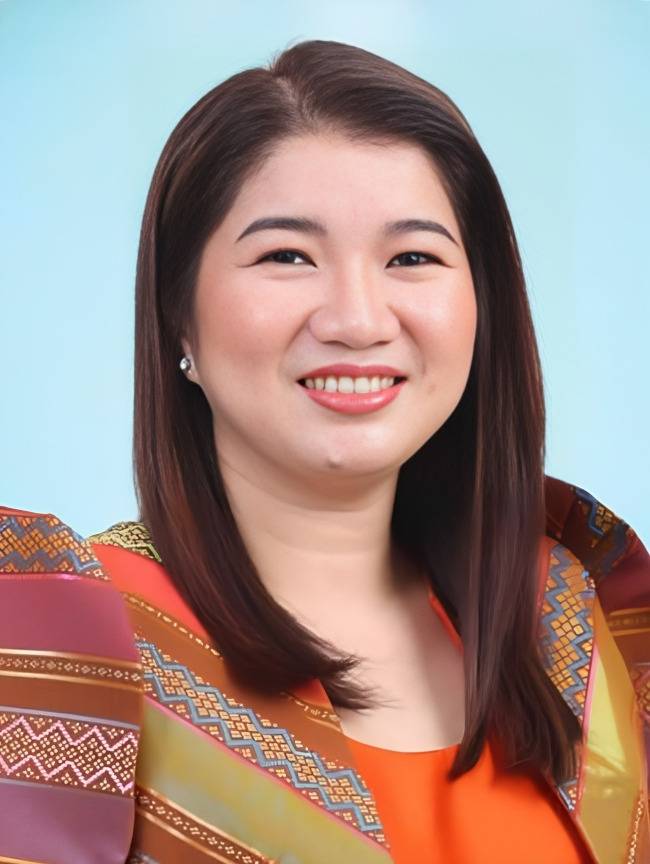
- Official portrait, 2022

Mayor of Marikina
- Incumbent
- Assumed office June 30, 2025
- Vice Mayor: Del de Guzman
- Preceded by: Marcelino Teodoro; Rommel Acuña (acting)

Member of the Philippine House of Representatives from Marikina's 1st congressional district
- In office June 30, 2022 – June 30, 2025
- Preceded by: Bayani Fernando
- Succeeded by: Marcelino Teodoro

Personal details
- Born: Marjorie Ann Ang; January 11, 1981 (age 45) Quezon City, Philippines
- Party: NUP (2024–present)
- Other political affiliations: UNA (2021–2024); Ating-Koop (party-list; 2018–2021)
- Spouse: Marcelino Teodoro
- Children: 2
- Education: University of Santo Tomas (BA, MA)
- Occupation: Politician; teacher

Marjorie Ann "Maan" Ang Teodoro (born January 11, 1981) is a Filipino politician who has served as the mayor of Marikina since 2025. A member of the National Unity Party (NUP), she previously served as the representative for Marikina's first district from 2022 to 2025.

Educated at the University of Santo Tomas, Teodoro taught at the Pamantasan ng Lungsod ng Marikina. She entered politics in 2019 as the first nominee of the Adhikain Tinaguyod ng Kooperatiba (Ating-Koop) Partylist, which failed to secure a seat in the House of Representatives. In 2022, she was elected as the representative for Marikina's first district as a member of the United Nationalist Alliance, succeeding longtime mayor Bayani Fernando. Her term as a representative has been characterized by legislation related to health and education.

After joining the NUP in 2024, Teodoro ran for mayor in 2025 and defeated fellow Representative Stella Quimbo in a competitive race.

== Early life and education ==
Marjorie Ann Ang was born on January 11, 1981, in Quezon City. She studied at the University of Santo Tomas, where she obtained a Bachelor of Arts in communication arts and later a Master of Arts in communications. After graduating, she worked as part of the faculty at the Pamantasan ng Lungsod ng Marikina.

== House of Representatives (2022–2025) ==
=== Elections ===
In 2019, Teodoro was named as the first nominee of the Adhikain Tinaguyod ng Kooperatiba (Ating-Koop) Partylist, which sought to represent consumers and small and medium enterprises. During the campaign, political watchdog group Kontra Daya criticized her party, along with others, for having "bastardized and corrupted" the partylist system. Her party was defeated, receiving 0.47% of the vote and no seats in the lower chamber.

In 2022, Teodoro filed to run for representative in Marikina's first district to succeed Bayani Fernando, who retired to run against her husband in the mayoral race. She ran under the United Nationalist Alliance with the support of her husband's coalition, Team MarCy. In the May 9, 2022, election, she was handily elected to the seat with 73.61% of the vote, defeating Jose Miguel Cadiz, who substituted for his uncle Jose Fabian Cadiz, who died before the election.

=== Tenure ===
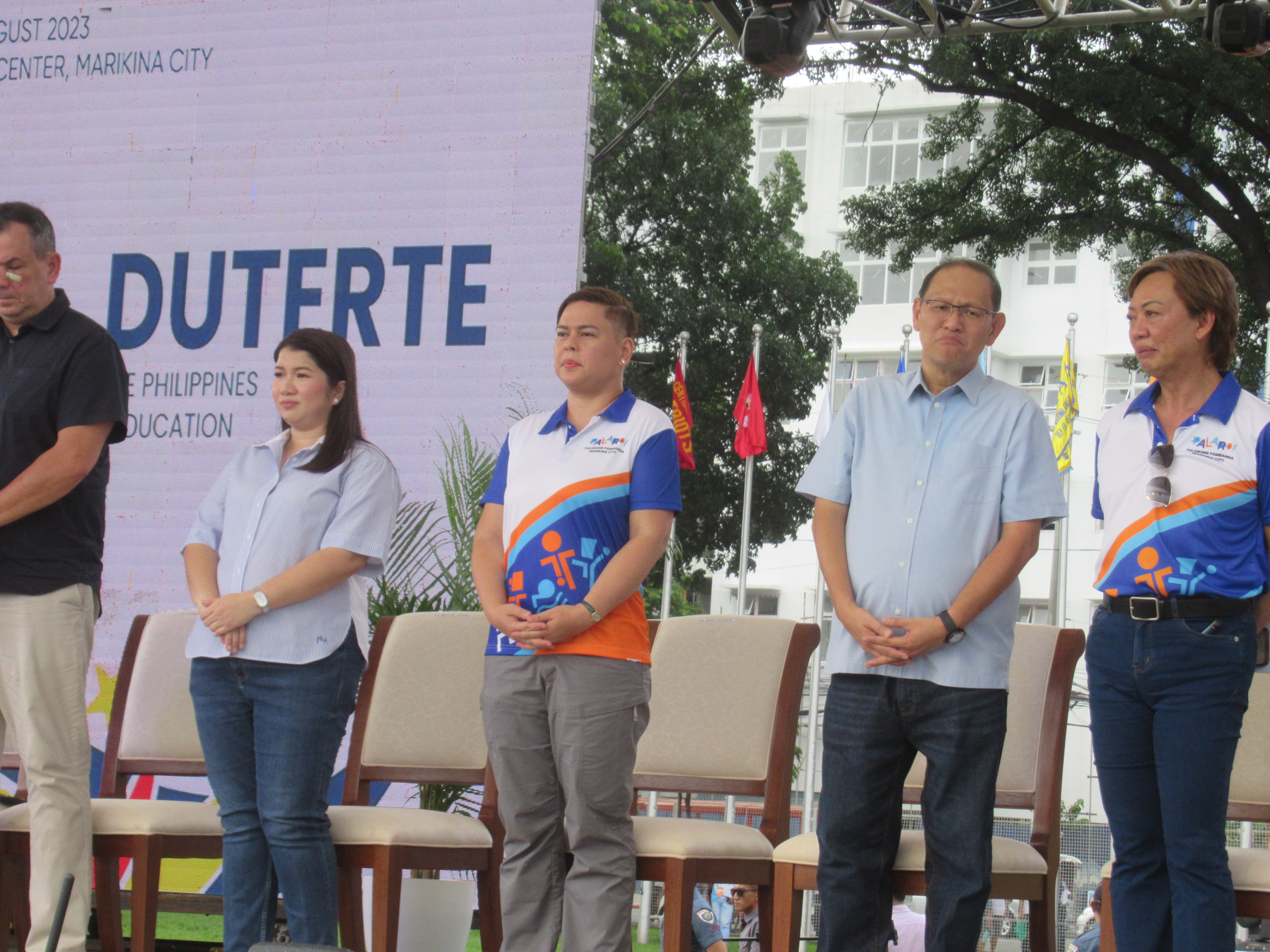
Teodoro (fourth from right) as a Marikina dignitary at the 2023 Palarong Pambansa.

Teodoro was sworn in as a representative on June 30, 2022. Upon the opening of the 19th Congress on July 28, she was appointed as one of the assistant majority leaders. Before starting her congressional term, she launched the "Buntis Congress" (lit. 'Congress of the Pregnant'), an annual reproductive healthcare program for women.

On September 11, 2023, Teodoro filed House Bill (HB) 8976, which proposed the provision of provide scholarship grants to Persons with Disabilities and their children. In October 2024, Teodoro successfully earmarked funds to develop a science and robotics laboratory at the Marikina Science High School as part of wider local investments in STEM education.

On February 5, 2025, Teodoro signed the impeachment complaint against Vice President Sara Duterte, which is expected to lead to a trial in the Senate of the Philippines in the 20th Congress. In May 2025, President Bongbong Marcos signed into law a bill co-authored by Teodoro, which that sought to double the bed capacity of the Amang Rodriguez Memorial Medical Center in Santo Niño.

On May 19, a break-in and attempted theft occurred at the senior citizens' affairs building of her district office, leading to delays in related services.

== 2025 Marikina mayoral campaign ==
Teodoro formally filed her certificate of candidacy for mayor of Marikina on October 7, 2024, with incumbent vice mayor Marion Andres as her running mate. She led the administration ticket as Team Marikina City, which affiliated with the National Unity Party and was nominally part of the wider Alyansa para sa Bagong Pilipinas. Her opponent in the mayoral race was fellow representative Stella Quimbo, who became a critic of his husband's administration and had described his governance as being adversarial to her programs as a representative.

Teodoro's platform sought to make the city "climate-resilient" and more business-friendly with "digitalization" and "ease of doing business" policies. Her campaign preferred to engage in campaign-sanctioned events and limited their media appearances, which led to criticism from media outlets, including Rappler. With the election held during the suspension of her husband's administration, her supporters defended Teodoro and her husband and condemned the latter's legal cases as being politically motivated and slanderous.

During the campaign, Teodoro received a show cause order from the Commission on Elections (COMELEC) for alleged incidents of vote buying during her campaign events. She would deny the allegations and condemned the related complaint as politically motivated, owing to the complainant's vocal support for Quimbo on social media.

Teodoro went on to narrowly defeat Quimbo in the race with the closest vote margin since 2016, when her husband defeated incumbent mayor Del de Guzman. De Guzman went on to defeat Andres, her running mate, in the mayoral race. Her victory was proclaimed on May 13, formally becoming mayor-elect. Upon her proclamation, she called for unity among her constituents and declared the "continuous growth of Marikina" as the priority of her incoming administration. She would become the woman to become mayor of Marikina after Marides Fernando, who served from 2001 to 2010.

Quimbo would later file an electoral protest against Teodoro before the COMELEC on August 15, citing alleged electoral irregularities, anomalies, and fraud.

== Mayor of Marikina (2025–present) ==
Teodoro was sworn in as mayor on June 30, 2025, succeeding her husband Marcelino. She took her oath of office the same day at the Supreme Court of the Philippines, alongside the councilors elected under her coalition. Upon taking office, Teodoro embarked on a series of ocular visits to other local government units as part of an effort to emulate their well-received projects and initiatives.

=== Early initiatives ===
In August 2025, Teodoro expanded the local government's efforts to enforce the curfew hours for minors in the city. That same month, she announced that her government would begin to digitalize local services.

=== Flood control ===
On August 8, 2025, Teodoro was elected as the focal mayor on flood mitigation and management of the League of Cities of the Philippines.

== Personal life ==
Teodoro is married to Marcelino Teodoro. They have two children. After Marcelino faced criminal complaints for acts of lasciviousness and rape by sexual assault in September 2025, Maan defended her husband, deeming the allegations false and politically motivated.

== Electoral history ==
Electoral history of Maan Teodoro
Year	Office	Party	Votes received				Result
Year	Office	Party	Total	%	P.	Swing	Result
2019	Representative (Party-list)	Ating-Koop	131,344	0.47%	67th	+0.10	Lost
2022	Representative (Marikina–1st)	UNA	68,572	73.61%	1st	—N/a	Won
2025	Mayor of Marikina	NUP	142,814	56.17%	1st	—N/a	Won

Political offices
Preceded by Marcelino Teodoro	Mayor of Marikina; 2025–present	Incumbent
House of Representatives of the Philippines
Preceded by Bayani Fernando	Member of the House of Representatives from Marikina's 1st district 2022–2025	Succeeded by Marcelino Teodoro
