= Romeo Candazo =

Filipino politician and lawyer (1952-2013)

Member of the Philippine House of Representatives from Marikina's at-large district
- In office June 30, 1992 – June 30, 2001
- Preceded by: Democlito Angeles
- Succeeded by: Del de Guzman

Personal details
- Born: June 18, 1952 Marikina, Rizal, Philippines
- Died: August 19, 2013 (aged 61) Marikina, Philippines
- Party: PMP (2009–2013)
- Other political affiliations: Liberal (1992–1995; 1998–2009); Lakas (1995–1998); Independent (1992); CPP (1971–1975)
- Occupation: Lawyer; politician; writer; radio anchor

Romeo "Ome" D. Candazo (June 18, 1952 – August 19, 2013) was a Filipino politician who served as the representative for Marikina's at-large district from 1992 to 2001. He was elected as an independent and later affiliated with the Liberal Party by the end of his tenure.

Born in Marikina, Candazo was educated at the University of the Philippines and was active in student activism, being imprisoned thrice during the presidency of Ferdinand Marcos. He was elected to the House of Representatives in 1992 as the member for Marikina's at-large district. With a tenure marked by anti-poverty legislation, he was re-elected twice, in 1995 and in 1998.

Candazo ran for mayor of Marikina in 2001 as a member of the Liberal Party and lost to Marides Fernando, the wife of the incumbent Bayani Fernando. Candazo ran in the 2010 Philippine House of Representatives elections to represent Marikina's second district in the lower house. He lost to Miro Quimbo, placing third.

== Early life and education ==
Candazo was born in Marikina, Rizal, on June 18, 1952. He studied law at the University of the Philippines. He obtained his AB History Degree in 1975 and finished his studies in 1986, passing the bar exam in the following year.

During his time as a student, he became involved with student activism; he was a member of the Samahang Demokratiko ng Kabataan (SDK), co-founding its Marikina chapter, and also became the first Secretary General of the Youth and Students Bureau of the Communist Party of the Philippines. As an activist during Ferdinand Marcos's regime, he was imprisoned thrice: in 1973, 1975, and 1979.

== House of Representatives of the Philippines (1992–2001) ==
=== Elections ===
In 1992, Candazo was elected to the House of Representatives, representing Marikina's at-large district. He was subsequently re-elected in 1995 and 1998.

=== Tenure ===
Candazo took office on June 30, 1992. Throughout his tenure, he had authored or co-authored 488 bills in Congress. His legislative portfolio largely revolved around livelihood opportunities and skills training to his poverty-stricken citizens within the city. While in Congress, Candazo maintained a shaky relationship with Mayor Bayani Fernando, although they collaborated in the efforts for Marikina cityhood, which succeeded in 1996.

In August 1996, Candazo met with editors of the Philippine Daily Inquirer. He anonymously testified how legislators and other government officials earned from overpricing projects in order to receive large commissions. Articles published following the meetings sparked public outrage over the misuse of the Countrywide Development Fund (CDF). His identity remained undisclosed up to his death. His testimony would later become the subject of the publication's exposé on the CDF.

Candazo left the office on June 30, 2001; he was succeeded by future mayor Del de Guzman.

== 2001 Marikina mayoral campaign ==
Upon reaching the term limit as a representative, Candazo ran for the mayoralty of Marikina under the Liberal Party. Candazo lost the election to Marides Fernando, who would serve until 2010.

== 2010 congressional campaign ==
In 2010, Candazo sought a comeback to the House of Representatives. He ran in the second district under the Pwersa ng Masang Pilipino banner. He lost to Miro Quimbo, placing third in the polls. He received 10,883 votes, or 13.52% of the votes.

== Personal life and death ==
Candazo worked as a writer and news anchor. Candazo died on August 19, 2013, of a heart attack. His wake was held in Concepcion Uno, Marikina. He was buried in Iglesia Filipina Independiente Cemetery.

== Electoral history ==
Year	Office	Party	Votes for Candazo				Result
Year	Office	Party	Total	%	P.	Swing	Result
1992	Representative (Marikina–at-large)	LDP	27,907	25.62%	1st	—N/a	Won
1995	Representative (Marikina–at-large)	Liberal	47,594	43.42%	1st	—N/a	Won
1998	Representative (Marikina–at-large)	Liberal	91,661	59.55%	1st	—N/a	Won
2001	Mayor of Marikina	Liberal	51,867	38.46%	2nd	—N/a	Lost
2004	Representative (Marikina–at-large)	PMP	70,617	49.39%	2nd	—N/a	Lost
2007	Representative (Marikina–at-large)	PMP	26,091	37.02%	2nd	—N/a	Lost
2010	Representative (Marikina–at-large)	PMP	10,883	13.52%	3rd	—N/a	Lost

House of Representatives of the Philippines
Preceded by Democlito Angeles	Member of the House of Representatives of the Philippines from Marikina's at-large district 1992–2001	Succeeded by Del de Guzman
