= Marikina's at-large congressional district =

Legislative district of the Philippines

- Former constituency for the House of Representatives of the Philippines
- Location of Marikina within Metro Manila
- City: Marikina
- Region: Metro Manila
- Population: 424,610 (2007)
- Major settlements: Marikina

Former constituency
- Created: 1987
- Abolished: 2007

Marikina's at-large congressional district was a congressional district for Marikina in the Philippines. It was represented in the House of Representatives from 1987 up to its division in 2007. The district was apportioned in 1987, pursuant to the constitution ratified that year, giving the city its own district after having been grouped with neighboring Pasig since 1984. The district was divided into two districts after an amendment to the city's charter was approved on December 15, 2006.

== Representation history ==
#	Member		Party	Tenure		Congress	Electoral history
#	Image	Name (Birth–Death)	Party	Start	End	Congress	Electoral history
District created February 2, 1987, from Pasig–Marikina district.
1		Democlito Angeles (born 1922)	Liberal	June 30, 1987	June 30, 1992	8th	Elected in 1987.
2		Romeo Candazo (1952–2013)	Independent	June 30, 1992	June 30, 2001	9th	Elected in 1992.
2		Romeo Candazo (1952–2013)	Liberal	June 30, 1992	June 30, 2001	9th	Elected in 1992.
2		Romeo Candazo (1952–2013)	Lakas	June 30, 1992	June 30, 2001	10th	Re-elected in 1995.
2		Romeo Candazo (1952–2013)	Liberal	June 30, 1992	June 30, 2001	11th	Re-elected in 1998.
3		Del de Guzman (born 1963)	Lakas	June 30, 2001	June 30, 2007	12th	Elected in 2001.
3		Del de Guzman (born 1963)	Lakas	June 30, 2001	June 30, 2007	13th	Re-elected in 2004. Redistricted to the 2nd district.
District dissolved into Marikina's 1st and 2nd districts

== See also ==
- Legislative Districts of Marikina
