= Jose Fabian Cadiz =

Filipino politician (1961–2022)

Jose Fabian Cadiz M.D.

Vice Mayor of Marikina
- In office June 30, 2010 – June 30, 2019
- Mayor: Del de Guzman (2010–2016); Marcelino Teodoro (2016–2019)
- Preceded by: Marion Andres
- Succeeded by: Marion Andres

Personal details
- Born: Jose Fabian Imperial Cadiz; January 11, 1961 Naga, Camarines Sur, Philippines
- Died: February 20, 2022 (aged 61) Antipolo, Rizal, Philippines
- Resting place: Loyola Memorial Park
- Party: NPC (2021–2022); Liberal (2010–2019)
- Education: University of the East Ramon Magsaysay Memorial Medical Center
- Occupation: Politician
- Profession: Physician

Jose Fabian Imperial Cadiz, M.D. (January 11, 1961 – February 20, 2022) was a Filipino politician and physician who served as the vice mayor of Marikina from 2010 to 2019, under the mayoralties of Del de Guzman and Marcelino Teodoro. Before his vice mayoralty, he served as a member of the Marikina City Council.

== Early life and education ==
Cadiz was born on January 11, 1961, in Naga, Camarines Sur. He attended the Naga Parochial School and later entered the Philippine Science High School for his secondary education. After finishing high school, Cadiz went on to attend the University of the Philippines, where he gained a bachelor's degree in biology. In pursuit of a career in medicine, he later joined the Medicine and Surgery Program at the University of the East Ramon Magsaysay Memorial Medical Center. He was among the top 20 examinees at the 1987 Medical Board Exam.

== Political career ==
=== Marikina City Council ===
As councilor for health and sanitation in the Marikina City Council, Cadiz initiated ordinances such as the Waste Segregation Ordinance, the Food Fortification Code of 2007, and the Galing Pook Awardee EcoSaver Program. He also established private clinics across Marikina.

=== Vice mayor of Marikina ===
Cadiz was elected vice mayor of Marikina in 2010, 2013, and 2016. He was the running mate of Mayor Del de Guzman in those elections. Being a physician by profession, his platform focused on healthcare. Cadiz was also a recreational cyclist and participated in city-wide cycling races.

=== Congressional bids ===
Upon being term-limited as vice mayor, Cadiz briefly sought the congressional seat for Marikina's 1st district in 2019, challenging incumbent Bayani Fernando. However, he withdrew from the race before the election day.

At the time of his death, Cadiz was seeking the same congressional seat once more in the 2022 Marikina local elections. He was later substituted by his nephew, Migoy, who would go on to be defeated by Marjorie Ann Teodoro.

== Reception ==
Cadiz received various recognition and awards, from most of the non-government organizations he joined. Among his awards were the Most Outstanding President of Rotary International District 3800 in 2005–2006 with the club district receiving the Most Outstanding Club of the Rotary Club of Marikina under his watch on the same year; In 2002–2003, the Civic Action Team under his watch was awarded the Most Outstanding NGO in support of Eastern Police District; He was also cited for managing to encourage the most number of attendees at the ACN2477, Marian Assembly during his tenure as a Faithful Navigator from 2008 to 2009. For his involvement with the Knights of Columbus, as Grand Knight from 1998 to 1999 of the Council 7160, his council was named the Most Outstanding Council in Luzon State. He also served as District Deputy A13 and was named the Outstanding District Deputy for 2001–2002.

== Death ==
Cadiz reportedly died from cardiac arrest on February 20, 2022, at the age of 61. A circulating Facebook video showed that the former vice mayor was in Antipolo, Rizal, after a cycling trip when he collapsed during a stopover. Relatives later confirmed that Cadiz collapsed while resting in a canteen in Sitio Boso Boso by Bosoboso Church and was rushed to Antipolo City Medical Center System Annex III at Sitio Cabading, Antipolo, but was later declared dead on arrival.

Political offices
Preceded by Marion Andres	Vice Mayor of Marikina; 2010–2019	Succeeded by Marion Andres
