= Marion Andres =

Filipino politician and physician (born 1958)

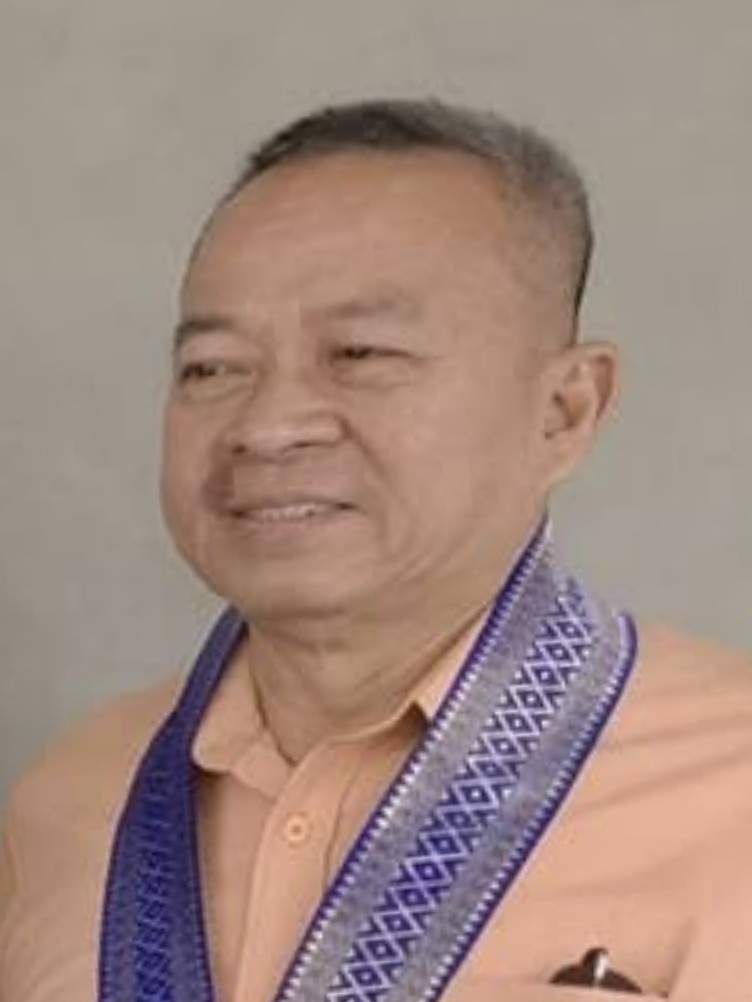
- Andres in 2024

Vice Mayor of Marikina
- In office June 30, 2019 – June 30, 2025 (Note: Suspended from March 25, 2025; Ronnie Acuña acted since suspension)
- Mayor: Marcelino Teodoro
- Preceded by: Jose Fabian Cadiz
- Succeeded by: Del de Guzman
- In office June 30, 2001 – June 30, 2010
- Mayor: Marides Fernando
- Preceded by: Del de Guzman
- Succeeded by: Jose Fabian Cadiz

Member of the Marikina City Council
- In office June 30, 1992 – June 30, 2001

Personal details
- Born: Marion Santos Andres; July 25, 1958 (age 68) Santo Niño, Marikina, Rizal, Philippines
- Party: NUP (2024–present)
- Other political affiliations: UNA (until 2024); Bagumbayan–VNP; Kabayani
- Spouse: Olivia Guevara Andres
- Children: 3
- Education: Marist School - Marikina; Lyceum-Northwestern University
- Occupation: Politician
- Profession: Physician
- Website: Marion Andres

Marion Santos Andres (born July 25, 1958) is a Filipino politician, physician, and retired military doctor who served as the vice mayor of Marikina from 2019 to 2025 under Mayor Marcelino Teodoro. He previously held the office from 2001 to 2010 under Marides Fernando.

The son of a former Marikina vice mayor, Andres served in the Marikina Municipal Council, later the Marikina City Council, from 1992 to 2001.

== Early life and education ==
Andres is the son of former Marikina vice mayor Jose S. Andres. He took his grade school and high school education from Marist School - Marikina. He graduated as a physician from the medical school of Lyceum-Northwestern University in Dagupan.

== Political career ==
Andres unsuccessfully ran for mayor in 2010 and for vice mayor in 2013. Andres was elected back to the vice mayoralty in 2019, as the running mate of incumbent mayor Marcelino Teodoro. He was re-elected in 2022.

In March 2025, Andres, along with Marikina Mayor Marcelino Teodoro and 13 members of the Marikina City Council were ordered suspended for six months by the Ombudsman as part of an investigation into the alleged misallocated use of ₱130 million in PhilHealth funds.

Andres ran for re-election as the running mate of Maan Teodoro in 2025. While Teodoro had won the mayoralty, he lost his bid to Del de Guzman.

== Notes ==
Political offices
Preceded by Del de Guzman	Vice Mayor of Marikina; 2001–2010	Succeeded by Jose Fabian Cadiz
Preceded by Jose Fabian Cadiz	Vice Mayor of Marikina; 2019–present	Succeeded by Del de Guzman
