= Del de Guzman =

Filipino politician (born 1963)

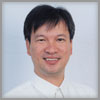
- Official portrait, 2004

Vice Mayor of Marikina
- Incumbent
- Assumed office June 30, 2025
- Mayor: Maan Teodoro
- Preceded by: Marion Andres; Ronnie Acuña (acting)
- In office June 30, 1992 – June 30, 2001
- Mayor: Bayani Fernando
- Preceded by: Felizardo C. Bulaong
- Succeeded by: Marion Andres

Mayor of Marikina
- In office June 30, 2010 – June 30, 2016
- Vice Mayor: Jose Fabian Cadiz
- Preceded by: Marides Fernando
- Succeeded by: Marcelino Teodoro

Member of the Philippine House of Representatives from Marikina
- In office June 30, 2001 – June 30, 2010
- Preceded by: Romeo Candazo
- Succeeded by: Miro Quimbo
- Constituency: Lone district (2001–2007); 2nd district (2007–2010)

Member of the Marikina Municipal Council
- In office February 2, 1988 – June 30, 1992

Personal details
- Born: Del Reyes de Guzman; January 9, 1963 (age 63) Marikina, Rizal, Philippines
- Party: Lakas (2000–2010; 2024–present)
- Other political affiliations: Aksyon (2021–2024); Liberal (2010–2021)
- Spouse: Amalia de Guzman (died)
- Profession: Politician

Del Reyes de Guzman (born January 9, 1963) is a Filipino politician who has served as the vice mayor of Marikina since 2025, under Mayor Maan Teodoro. De Guzman previously held the office from 1992 to 2001 under Bayani Fernando. He previously served as a representative for the city from 2001 to 2010 and as mayor from 2010 to 2016.

Born to a family involved in the local shoe industry, de Guzman served in the Marikina Municipal Council (now the city council) from 1988 to 1992. He allied with Fernando during his tenure in the council and ran as his vice mayoral running mate in the 1992 elections. In 2001, he was elected to Congress under the Kabayani slate and affiliated with Speaker Jose de Venecia Jr. during his tenure.

De Guzman was elected mayor in 2010, succeeding Marides Fernando. He instituted a "gentler" style of governance to distinguish himself from his immediate predecessors. During his tenure, he was charged twice on separate occasions by the Office of the Ombudsman, which resulted in a preventive suspension in 2013. He was re-elected as mayor in the 2013 elections before losing reelection in 2016 to Marcelino Teodoro.

In 2022, de Guzman unsuccessfully ran for representative in Marikina's second district, losing to incumbent Stella Quimbo. Quimbo later selected de Guzman as her running mate in her 2025 mayoral campaign. While Quimbo lost the election, de Guzman defeated the incumbent vice mayor Marion Andres, marking his return to elected office.

== Early life and career ==
=== Family and entry into politics ===
De Guzman was born on January 9, 1963, in Marikina, Rizal, to a family involved in the local shoe industry; his father Rodolfo de Guzman worked for a footwear shop and served as principal of the Nangka Elementary School while his mother owned a factory, which was later operated by his brother before closing in 2000. One of his relatives was Osmundo de Guzman (1924–1986), the longest-serving mayor of Marikina.

He entered public office after the People Power Revolution as a member of the Marikina Municipal Council. During his tenure, he led the drafting of a resolution to compel the Philippine Long Distance Telephone Company to upgrade their telephone services in the then-municipality in response to public clamor in 1991.

=== First vice mayoralty (1992–2001) ===
In the 1992 elections, de Guzman ran for vice mayor as the running mate of contractor Bayani Fernando, positioning themselves as the opposition to the incumbent administration led by Mayor Rodolfo B. Valentino. Their camp, affiliated with the Lakas–NUCD, ran on a platform focused on infrastructure development economic growth. De Guzman went on to narrowly defeat Orly San Diego of the Laban ng Demokratikong Pilipino by a margin of 3,166 votes.

Sworn in at age 26, de Guzman became the youngest person to assume the city's vice mayoralty. As vice mayor, he presided over a city council marked with a sharp division between the majority bloc affiliated with Mayor Fernando and the minority bloc, named "Voltes 5", affiliated with Representative Romeo Candazo, in a term defined by attempts from both factions to initiate recall petitions against each other.

In 1996, de Guzman joined the local administration and industry in supporting for the cityhood bill authored by Candazo, which passed into law as Republic Act No. 8223 and was approved through a plebiscite in December.

== House of Representatives (2001–2010) ==
=== Campaigns ===
In the 2001 elections, de Guzman ran for representative for Marikina's lone district as part of the Kabayani slate led by Marides Fernando, who sought to succeed her husband as mayor. He went on to win the seat, defeating Virgilio Farcon Jr. and Celso delos Angeles Jr. with 53,487 votes. In the 2004 elections, de Guzman won a second term, defeating Candazo, who sought a congressional return, with a margin of 172 votes, making the contest the closest in Metro Manila.

Upon the partition of the lone district leading up to the 2007 elections, de Guzman was redistricted to the second district, where he would win a third term in Congress, defeating Candazo in a rematch. During the election, his campaign manager, Mila Andrade, was assassinated on May 3, 2007, by a man riding a motorcycle.

=== Tenure ===
During his congressional tenure, de Guzman affiliated himself with the majority bloc led by Speaker Jose de Venecia Jr.

== Mayor of Marikina (2010–2016) ==
=== Campaigns ===
In the 2010 elections, de Guzman ran for mayor to succeed term-limited mayor Marides Fernando, with physician and councilor Jose Fabian Cadiz as his running mate. He defeated then-outgoing vice mayor Marion Andres and Alfredo Cheng with 66.34% of the vote, with Cadiz winning the vice mayoralty with 57.91% of the vote. In the 2013 elections, de Guzman was reelected along with Cadiz with 88.21% of the vote.

In the 2016 elections, de Guzman faced a challenge from Representative Marcelino Teodoro, who received the endorsement of Bayani Fernando, who repudiated de Guzman as a "non-performer. During the campaign, de Guzman and Cadiz received the endorsement of the Iglesia ni Cristo. De Guzman went on to lose re-election to Teodoro by a narrow margin of 4,987 votes. While he acknowledged the role of Fernando's endorsement in his defeat, he alleged Teodoro's camp committed vote buying during the campaign, which Teodoro denounced as "black propaganda".

=== Early tenure ===
De Guzman was sworn in on June 30, 2010. As mayor, de Guzman differentiated himself from his predecessors, Bayani and Marides Fernando, by taking on a more gentle approach to local governance as opposed to the Fernandos' "iron-fisted rule". On May 2, 2012, de Guzman signed into law an ordinance banning non-biodegradable packaging of dry goods and regulating its use on wet goods in local commerce, joining Las Piñas and Muntinlupa in adopting such measures in Metro Manila.

=== Suspensions and charges ===
On May 20, 2013, the Office of the Ombudsman under Conchita Carpio-Morales suspended de Guzman and two other officials for six months for simple neglect of duty over his administration's failure to respond to a complaint regarding the illegal construction of a guard house, a steel gate and a lane hump in a subdivision.

On June 3, the Office of the Ombudsman charged de Guzman, Vice Mayor Cadiz, and eleven members of the city council for violating the Anti-Graft and Corrupt Practices Act after a Christmas bazaar project with the Philippine Chamber of Commerce and Industry (PCCI), costing ₱22 million to be paid in installments, was mishandled and led to incomplete payments to the detriment of the city government. Then-former vice mayor Marion Andres, who was instrumental in the complaint, further alleged that de Guzman and PCCI–Marikina President Eduardo Francisco conspired in October 2012 to enter into the relevant contract without conducting the required bidding processes. The charges prompted the 13 directors of PCCI–Marikina to resign en masse, citing a loss of confidence in Francisco.

== Post-mayoralty (2016–present) ==
=== Subsequent campaigns ===
In the 2022 election, de Guzman ran for representative of Marikina's second district under Aksyon Demokratiko, campaigning with the party's presidential candidate Isko Moreno. He went on to lose to incumbent Stella Quimbo by a wide margin of 82,434 votes. In the following election cycle, de Guzman sought a return to the vice mayoralty under Lakas–CMD, as the running mate of Quimbo While Quimbo was defeated, de Guzman went on to narrowly defeat the incumbent vice mayor, Marion Andres, marking his return to elected office.

=== Second vice mayoralty (2025–present) ===
De Guzman was sworn in in as vice mayor for his first term under the mayoralty of Maan Teodoro (fourth overall) on June 30, 2025.

== Personal life ==
De Guzman was married to Amalia de Guzman until her death on January 1, 2014, at the age of 46. In 2013, de Guzman declared a net worth of ₱2.31 million, making him the least wealthy mayor in Metro Manila at the time. In June 2026, his son David Alfre summoned by the Land Transportation Office for a DUI incident that resulted in the death of a public school teacher. De Guzman's office issued an apology in response to the incident.

Political offices
Preceded by Marion Andres	Vice Mayor of Marikina; 2025–present	Incumbent
Preceded by Marides Fernando	Mayor of Marikina; 2010–2016	Succeeded by Marcelino Teodoro
Preceded by Felizardo C. Bulaong	Vice Mayor of Marikina; 1992–2001	Succeeded by Marion Andres
House of Representatives of the Philippines
Preceded by Romeo Candazo	Member of the House of Representatives from Marikina's at-large district 2001–2007	District dissolved
New district	Member of the House of Representatives from Marikina's 2nd district 2007–2010	Succeeded by Miro Quimbo
