= Legislative districts of Marikina =

Legislative district of the Philippines

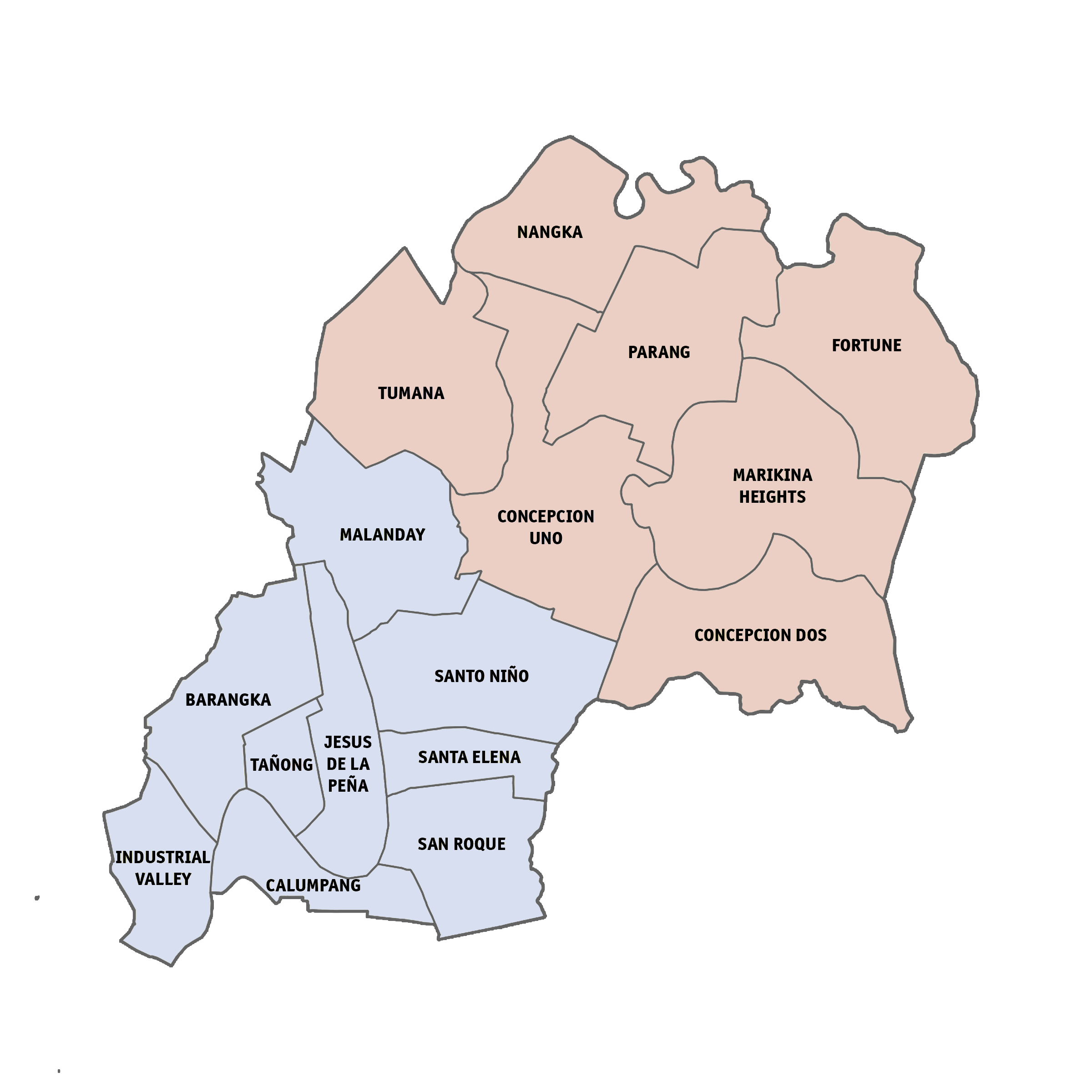
Marikina's legislative districts. First District Second District

The legislative districts of Marikina are the representations of the highly urbanized city of Marikina in the various national and local legislatures of the Philippines. Since the 2007 elections, the city has been represented in the House of Representatives of the Philippines by its two congressional districts, with the districts' representatives being elected every three years. The congressional districts are coextensive with the city's councilor districts, which each elect eight members to the Marikina City Council, creating a total of sixteen elective seats in the legislature.

== History ==
Marikina was first represented as part of the at-large district of the province of Manila in the Malolos Congress from 1898 to 1899. The then-town was later incorporated to the province of Rizal, established in 1901, and was represented as part of the second district of Rizal from 1907 to 1941 and from 1945 to 1972. During World War II, the then-town was represented as part of the at-large district of Rizal in the National Assembly of the Second Philippine Republic from 1943 to 1944. From 1916 to 1935, Marikina was also represented in the Senate of the Philippines as part of the 4th district. Since the abolition of the abolition of the Senate in 1935 and the subsequent restoration of the bicameral congress, senators have been elected at-large. It was part of the representation of Region IV in the Interim Batasang Pambansa from 1978 to 1984. It was grouped with Pasig from 1984 to 1986 for representation in the Regular Batasang Pambansa, as part of the Legislative district of Pasig–Marikina. Marikina was given its own representation in the restored House of Representatives in 1987, and was divided into two districts after an amendment (Republic Act No. 9364) to its city charter (Republic Act No. 8223) was approved on December 15, 2006.

== Current districts ==
The city was last redistricted in 2007, where the at-large district was split into the first and second districts. The city's current congressional delegation composes of a member of the National Unity Party (NUP) and a member of the Partido Federal ng Pilipinas (PFP). In the city council, the first district is represented by five members of the NUP, two of Lakas, and one independent; the second district is represented by five members of the NUP and three of Lakas–CMD.

Legislative districts and representatives of Marikina
District	Current Representative			Barangays	Population (2020)	Area	Map
District	Image	Name	Party	Barangays	Population (2020)	Area	Map
1st		Marcelino Teodoro (since 2025); San Roque	NUP	List: Barangka; Calumpang; Industrial Valley Complex; Jesus de la Peña; Malanday; San Roque; Santa Elena; Santo Niño; Tañong	174,892	9.03 km^{2}	
2nd		Miro Quimbo (since 2025); Concepcion Dos	PFP	List: Concepcion Uno; Concepcion Dos; Fortune; Marikina Heights; Parang; Nangka; Tumana	281,167	13.62 km^{2}	

== Historical and defunct district boundaries ==
District boundary changes
Year	Map	Constituent Barangays
2007–present		First: Barangka; Calumpang; Industrial Valley Complex; Jesus de la Peña; Malanday; San Roque; Santa Elena; Santo Niño; Tañong; Second: Concepcion Uno; Concepcion Dos; Fortune; Marikina Heights; Parang; Nangka; Tumana
1987–2007	Marikina was represented by an at-large district encompassing its entirety.	

== See also ==
- Legislative districts of Rizal
- Legislative district of Pasig–Marikina
