= Miro Quimbo =

Filipino politician (born 1969)

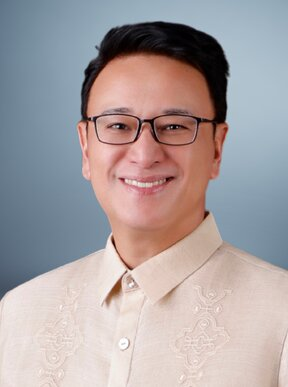
- Official portrait, 2025

Member of the Philippine House of Representatives from Marikina's 2nd district
- Incumbent
- Assumed office June 30, 2025
- Preceded by: Stella Quimbo
- In office June 30, 2010 – June 30, 2019
- Preceded by: Del de Guzman
- Succeeded by: Stella Quimbo
Committee positions
Chairman of the Philippine House Committee on Ways and Means
Incumbent
Assumed office July 30, 2025
Preceded by	Joey Salceda

Deputy Speaker of the House of Representatives of the Philippines
- In office July 25, 2016 – July 25, 2018
- House Speaker: Pantaleon Alvarez

Personal details
- Born: Romero Federico Saenz Quimbo; December 12, 1969 (age 56) Catbalogan, Samar, Philippines
- Party: PFP (2026–present)
- Other political affiliations: Lakas (2024–2026); Liberal (2009–2024)
- Spouse: Stella Alabastro (m. 1998)
- Children: 4
- Education: University of the Philippines Diliman (BA, LL.B.)
- Profession: Politician
- Website: miroquimbo.com

Romero Federico "Miro" Saenz Quimbo (born December 12, 1969) is a Filipino politician who has served as the representative for Marikina's second district since 2025. A member of Partido Federal ng Pilipinas, he previously held the seat from 2010 to 2019.

Educated at the University of the Philippines Diliman, Quimbo began his legal career as an associate of the Poblador Bautista & Reyes law firm, during which he participated in the impeachment of Joseph Estrada. He became the chief executive officer (CEO) of the Pag-IBIG Fund in 2002 and served until 2009, when he resigned to run for a seat in the House of Representatives as a member of the Liberal Party.

During his tenure in Congress, he held senior roles in the lower house and within the Liberal Party. During the 2016 elections, he served as the campaign manager of the Senate slate of the administration-backed Koalisyon ng Daang Matuwid and remained with the party following an exodus of members to PDP–Laban. Following Gloria Macapagal Arroyo's election as House speaker, he claimed the minority leadership before losing a voice vote to minority leader Danilo Suarez, an outcome he has since contested.

In August 2024, Quimbo joined Lakas–CMD, the largest party in the lower house at the time. He was elected back to the lower house in 2025, marking his return to the legislature after a six-year absence. In March 2026, he joined the Partido Federal ng Pilipinas, the ruling party under President Bongbong Marcos.

== Early life and career ==
Quimbo was born on December 12, 1969, in Catbalogan, Samar. He is the son of Romulo Quimbo, who would serve as a justice of the Sandiganbayan. He spent his first two years of elementary school at the Sacred Heart College in Catbalogan before transferring to the Marist School in Marikina, where he completed his elementary and secondary education. He took up Bachelor of Arts in history at the University of the Philippines Diliman, where he also pursued his legal studies. He is also a member of the UP Alpha Sigma.

After graduating, he worked as the chief of staff of Representative Catalino Figueroa of Samar's second district from 1996 to 1998. He was hired as an associate of the Poblador Bautista & Reyes law firm in Makati. During his time at the law firm, Quimbo notarized the affidavit of a witness in the impeachment of President Joseph Estrada and presented their testimony during the impeachment trial.

== CEO of the Pag-IBIG Fund ==
He joined the Pag-IBIG Fund in 2001 as its deputy chief executive officer (CEO). In 2002, he was appointed as head of the same agency, serving until February of 2009. During that period, the Fund became the most profitable government corporation and was consistently listed in the top ten corporations in the Philippines. In 2008, the Pag-IBIG Fund was awarded the United Nations Scroll of Honour for its outstanding and innovative housing programs, a first for any Philippine government agency. That same year, the Fund was given an AAA corporate rating, a distinction given to a government corporation for the first time.

In 2007, he was recognized by the Philippine Jaycees as one of the Ten Outstanding Young Men for his leadership of the Pag-IBIG Fund.

== Congressional bids ==
=== First stint ===
After resigning as the CEO of the Pag-IBIG fund in 2010, Quimbo announced his bid for representative, running in Markina's second district. He went on to win in an upset, defeating Councilor Donn Favis. He was reelected in 2013 and 2016.

=== 2025 ===
Quimbo's margin of victory by barangay Legend: 10–20% 20–30% 30–40%

On August 6, 2024, Quimbo left the Liberal Party and joined Lakas–CMD, the largest party in the House of Representatives, led by House Speaker Martin Romualdez. He filed his candidacy to succeed his wife Stella as a representative after she launched a campaign for the mayoralty. He joined her ticket Team Bagong Marikina (lit. 'Team New Marikina'; also stylized as Team Bagong Marik1na), which positioned itself as the opposition to the incumbent administration led by Mayor Marcelino Teodoro, whom they had criticized as being adversarial to Stella's projects and policies during her tenure as a representative. He faced Councilor Donn Favis, his main rival in the 2010, in the congressional race, along with two minor candidates.

During the campaign, Quimbo criticized the dredging operations of the Teodoro administration in the Marikina River, which he criticized as ineffective and prone to corruption.

On April 26, 2025, the Commission on Elections (COMELEC) Kontra Bigay committee issued show-cause orders to both Stella and Miro to explain their conduct over alleged incidents of vote buying and abuse of state resources during their respective campaigns. In response, they released a joint statement denying the claims and ensuring their compliance with the order.

In the May 12 election, Quimbo defeated Favis in a landslide, winning 60.95% of the vote.

== House of Representatives ==
=== Aquino administration (2010–2016) ===
During his first term, he served as a Deputy Majority Leader. On his second term, he was elected as chairman of the Philippine House Committee on Ways and Means and the spokesperson of the Liberal Party. From 2010 to 2014, Quimbo's wealth increased by ₱1.33 million.

In the early stages of the Globe Asiatique scandal, Quimbo, as the former CEO of the Pag-IBIG Fund, was summoned by the Senate to explain his role in the dispute. He would be cleared later on of any wrongdoing on this matter. During the impeachment of Renato Corona from 2011 to 2012, Quimbo served as a spokesperson of the prosecution team, alongside Tranquil Salvador III and Valentina Santana-Cruz.

In March 2014, Quimbo expressed his openness to participating in the Congressional inquiry on the Globe Asiatique scandal. In June, Alex Alvarez, a former manager at Pag-IBIG, co-accused of estafa with Delfin Lee, filed a corruption case against Quimbo before the Office of the Ombudsman, citing his failure to implement preventive guidelines during its dealings with Globe Asiatique. Quimbo dismissed the case, deeming it a rehash of a similar case dismissed by the Ombudsman that same year. The cases were all dismissed for lack of merit.

During the 2016 elections, Quimbo served as the campaign manager of the Senate slate of the administration-backed Koalisyon ng Daang Matuwid, which went on to win seven seats in the upper house. In his role, he opposed the disqualification of Senator Grace Poe as a presidential candidate, deeming the pertinent cases baseless.

=== Duterte administration (2016–2019) ===
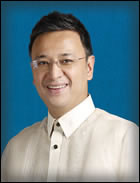
Quimbo's official portrait during the 17th Congress (2016–2019).

Quimbo remained with the Liberal Party for the 17th Congress, when many Liberal members of Congress switched to PDP–Laban, the ruling party under President Rodrigo Duterte. After being appointed as a deputy speaker following the election of Pantaleon Alvarez as House speaker, he became the highest-ranking member of the Liberal Party during that congressional period. During his term, he opposed efforts to impeach Duterte, citing the president's popularity.

After Vice President Leni Robredo resigned from the Duterte Cabinet in December 2016, Quimbo remained keen on remaining in the majority bloc but stated that he would be ready to leave the majority should it contradict his party's principles. He condemned the subsequent removal of several House leaders from their posts over their votes opposing the death penalty bill.

Following the ouster of Alvarez from the speakership in favor of Gloria Macapagal Arroyo, Quimbo stepped down as deputy speaker and joined 31 other members in forming the minority bloc under her speakership. Both Quimbo and Danilo Suarez claimed the minority leadership following Arroyo's election, with Quimbo contending that he was the rightful holder of the role, as Suarez actively campaigned for Arroyo, citing House rules affirmed by the Supreme Court. Suarez denied Quimbo's claims, stating that he remains minority leader until a new election for the role is held. During the dispute, Vice President Robredo expressed support for Quimbo, deeming Suarez's retention a failure of House leadership to provide a "real opposition".

A motion by Majority Leader Rolando Andaya Jr. succeeded by voice vote in retaining Alvarez in the minority leadership, a move Quimbo criticized as unlawful and later contested. He was term-limited in the 2019 elections and was succeeded by his wife, Stella.

=== Return to Congress (since 2025) ===
Quimbo began his fourth term as a representative on June 30, 2025, marking his return to the legislature. On July 30, he returned to his former role as the chairman of the ways and means committee. Together with a number of fellow house leaders, Quimbo joined the Partido Federal ng Pilipinas in March 2026.

== Personal life ==
Quimbo married economist Stella Alabastro in August 1998; they have three sons and one daughter.

== Electoral history ==
Electoral history of Miro Quimbo
Year	Office	Party	Votes received				Result
Year	Office	Party	Total	%	P.	Swing	Result
2010	Representative (Marikina–2nd)	Liberal	45,690	56.77%	1st	—N/a	Won
2013	Representative (Marikina–2nd)	Liberal	67,406	95.10%	1st	+38.33	Won
2016	Representative (Marikina–2nd)	Liberal	85,915	100%	1st	+4.90	Won
2025	Representative (Marikina–2nd)	Lakas	86,984	60.95%	1st	-39.05	Won

House of Representatives of the Philippines
Preceded by Stella Quimbo	Member of the House of Representatives from Marikina's 2nd district 2025–present	Incumbent
Preceded by Del de Guzman	Member of the House of Representatives from Marikina's 2nd district 2010–2019	Succeeded by Stella Quimbo
