= Marikina's 2nd congressional district =

Legislative district of the Philippines

- Constituency for the House of Representatives of the Philippines
- Interactive map of the district boundaries
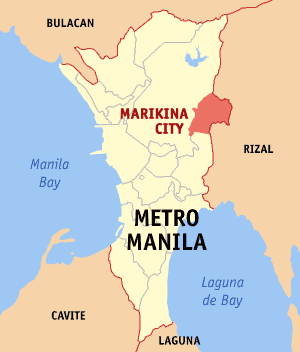
- Location of Marikina within Metro Manila
- City: Marikina
- Region: Metro Manila
- Population: 281,167 (2020)
- Electorate: 146,451 (2022)
- Major settlements: 7 barangays: Concepcion Uno; Concepcion Dos; Fortune; Marikina Heights; Parang; Nangka; Tumana
- Area: 13.62 km^{2} (5.26 sq mi)

Current constituency
- Created: 2006
- Representative: Miro Quimbo
- Political party: PFP
- Congressional bloc: Majority

Marikina's 2nd congressional district is one of the two congressional districts of the Philippines in the city of Marikina. The district covers the seven northern Marikina barangays of Concepcion Uno, Concepcion Dos, Fortune, Marikina Heights, Parang, Nangka, and Tumana.

The district has been represented in the House of Representatives of the Philippines since 2007. An amendment to the 1996 Marikina City Charter, passed in 2006, created the district from Marikina's at-large congressional district.

Miro Quimbo of the Partido Federal ng Pilipinas, elected as a member of Lakas, has represented the district since 2025.

== Representation history ==
#	Member		Tenure		Congress	Party	Electoral history	Constituent LGUs
#	Image	Name	Start	End	Congress	Party	Electoral history	Constituent LGUs
District created December 15, 2006.
1		Del de Guzman (born 1963)	June 30, 2007	June 30, 2010	14th	Lakas	Redistricted from the at-large district and re-elected in 2007.	2007–present Concepcion Uno, Concepcion Dos, Fortune, Marikina Heights, Parang, Nangka, Tumana
1		Del de Guzman (born 1963)	June 30, 2007	June 30, 2010	14th	Liberal	Redistricted from the at-large district and re-elected in 2007.	2007–present Concepcion Uno, Concepcion Dos, Fortune, Marikina Heights, Parang, Nangka, Tumana
2		Miro Quimbo (born 1969)	June 30, 2010	June 30, 2019	15th	Liberal	Elected in 2010.	2007–present Concepcion Uno, Concepcion Dos, Fortune, Marikina Heights, Parang, Nangka, Tumana
2		Miro Quimbo (born 1969)	June 30, 2010	June 30, 2019	16th	Liberal	Re-elected in 2013.	2007–present Concepcion Uno, Concepcion Dos, Fortune, Marikina Heights, Parang, Nangka, Tumana
2		Miro Quimbo (born 1969)	June 30, 2010	June 30, 2019	17th	Liberal	Re-elected in 2016.	2007–present Concepcion Uno, Concepcion Dos, Fortune, Marikina Heights, Parang, Nangka, Tumana
3		Stella Quimbo (born 1969)	June 30, 2019	June 30, 2025	18th	Liberal	Elected in 2019.	2007–present Concepcion Uno, Concepcion Dos, Fortune, Marikina Heights, Parang, Nangka, Tumana
3		Stella Quimbo (born 1969)	June 30, 2019	June 30, 2025	19th	Lakas	Re-elected in 2022.	2007–present Concepcion Uno, Concepcion Dos, Fortune, Marikina Heights, Parang, Nangka, Tumana
(2)		Miro Quimbo (born 1969)	June 30, 2025	Incumbent	20th	Lakas	Elected in 2025.	2007–present Concepcion Uno, Concepcion Dos, Fortune, Marikina Heights, Parang, Nangka, Tumana
(2)		Miro Quimbo (born 1969)	June 30, 2025	Incumbent	20th	PFP	Elected in 2025.	2007–present Concepcion Uno, Concepcion Dos, Fortune, Marikina Heights, Parang, Nangka, Tumana

== Election results ==
=== 2025 ===
2025 Philippine House of Representatives election in Marikina's 2nd district
Candidate	Party	Votes	%
Miro Quimbo	Lakas–CMD	93,771	61.54
Donn Favis	National Unity Party	56,190	36.87
Mauro Arce	Independent	1,450	0.95
Jose Jaime Enage	Independent	971	0.64
Total		152,382	100.00
Registered voters/turnout		175,747	–
Lakas–CMD hold			

=== 2022 ===
2022 Philippine House of Representatives election in Marikina's 2nd district
Party	Candidate	Votes	%
Liberal	Stella Quimbo (incumbent)	103,108	82.70%
Aksyon	Del De Guzman	20,674	16.58%
KBL	Mauro Arce	894	0.72%
Total votes		124,676	100.00%
Liberal hold			

=== 2019 ===
2019 Philippine House of Representatives election in Marikina's 2nd district
Party	Candidate	Votes	%
Liberal	Stella Quimbo	79,598	83.74
Independent	Eugene de Vera	13,995	14.72
Independent	Mauro Arce	1,461	1.54
Total votes		95,054	100.00
Liberal hold			

=== 2016 ===
2016 Philippine House of Representatives election in Marikina's 2nd District
Party	Candidate	Votes	%
Liberal	Miro Quimbo	85,915	84.68%
Invalid or blank votes		15,547	15.32%
Total votes		101,462	100%
Liberal hold			

=== 2013 ===
2013 Philippine House of Representatives Election Results in Marikina's 2nd District
Party	Candidate	Votes	%
Liberal	Miro Quimbo	67,406	88.57
Independent	Albert Bocobo	3,476	4.57
Invalid or blank votes		5,227	6.87
Total votes		76,109	100.00
Liberal hold			

=== 2010 ===
2010 Philippine House of Representatives election in Marikina's 2nd district
Party	Candidate	Votes	%
Liberal	Miro Quimbo	45,690	56.77
Bagumbayan	Donn Carlo Favis	13,073	16.24
PMP	Romeo Candazo	10,883	13.52
Independent	Hilario Punzalan	4,744	5.89
Independent	Adjuthor De Guzman	3,704	4.60
Independent	Eduardo Francisco	1,515	1.88
Independent	Benjamin Baretto	616	0.77
Independent	Rogelio Serrano	149	0.19
Independent	Felizardo Bulaong	112	0.14
Valid ballots		80,486	93.25
Invalid or blank votes		5,823	6.75
Total votes		80,486	100.00
Liberal hold			

== See also ==
- Legislative districts of Marikina
