= Marides Fernando =

Filipino politician (born 1957)

Mayor of Marikina
- In office June 30, 2001 – June 30, 2010
- Vice Mayor: Marion Andres
- Preceded by: Bayani Fernando
- Succeeded by: Del de Guzman

Personal details
- Born: Maria Lourdes Carlos; February 10, 1957 (age 69) Quezon City, Philippines
- Party: Lakas
- Spouse: Bayani Fernando (died 2023)
- Children: 1
- Education: University of the Philippines Diliman (BS); Cornell University (MPS)

Maria Lourdes "Marides" Carlos-Fernando (born February 10, 1957), also known by her initials MCF, is a Filipino politician who served as the mayor of Marikina from 2001 to 2010.

== Early life and education ==
Fernando studied hotel and restaurant administration from the University of the Philippines Diliman and graduated with a Bachelor of Science.

== Mayor of Marikina (2001–2010) ==
In 2001, Fernando succeeded her husband, Bayani, as the mayor of Marikina. She is the first woman to hold such position. She sought reelection in 2004. Together with her husband, she formed the local party Kabayani to contest the election and allied themselves with the ruling Lakas–CMD.

In 2008, Fernando was named as one of the 11 finalists for the World Mayor award. She ranked seventh behind Helen Zille of Cape Town, South Africa.

Political offices
Preceded by Bayani Fernando	Mayor of Marikina; 2001–2010	Succeeded by Del de Guzman
