= Marikina's 1st congressional district =

Legislative district of the Philippines

- Constituency for the House of Representatives of the Philippines
- Interactive map of thee district boundaries
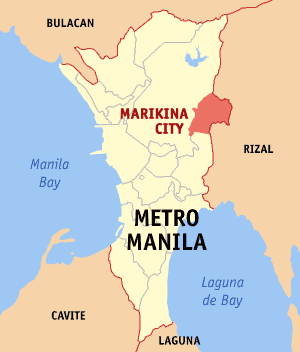
- Location of Marikina within Metro Manila
- City: Marikina
- Region: Metro Manila
- Population: 174,892 (2020)
- Electorate: 114,298 (2022)
- Major settlements: 9 barangays: Barangka; Calumpang; Industrial Valley Complex; Jesus de la Peña; Malanday; San Roque; Santa Elena; Santo Niño; Tañong
- Area: 9.03 km^{2} (3.49 sq mi)

Current constituency
- Created: 2006
- Representative: Marcelino Teodoro
- Political party: NUP
- Congressional bloc: TBD

Marikina's 1st congressional district is one of the two congressional districts of the Philippines in the city of Marikina. The district covers the southern Marikina barangays of Barangka, Calumpang, Industrial Valley Complex, Jesus de la Peña, Malanday, San Roque, Santa Elena, Santo Niño and Tañong.

The district been represented in the House of Representatives of the Philippines since 2007. An amendment to the 1996 Marikina City Charter, passed in 2006, created the district from Marikina's at-large congressional district.

Marcelino Teodoro of the National Unity Party (NUP) has represented the district since 2025.

== Representation history ==
#	Image	Member	Term of office		Congress	Party	Electoral history	Constituent LGUs
#	Image	Member	Start	End	Congress	Party	Electoral history	Constituent LGUs
District created December 15, 2006 from Marikina's at-large district.
1		Marcelino Teodoro (born 1970)	June 30, 2007	June 30, 2016	14th	Independent	Elected in 2007.	2007–present Barangka, Calumpang, Industrial Valley Complex, Jesus de la Peña, Malanday, San Roque, Santa Elena, Santo Niño, Tañong
1		Marcelino Teodoro (born 1970)	June 30, 2007	June 30, 2016	15th	Liberal	Re-elected in 2010.	2007–present Barangka, Calumpang, Industrial Valley Complex, Jesus de la Peña, Malanday, San Roque, Santa Elena, Santo Niño, Tañong
1		Marcelino Teodoro (born 1970)	June 30, 2007	June 30, 2016	16th	NPC	Re-elected in 2013.	2007–present Barangka, Calumpang, Industrial Valley Complex, Jesus de la Peña, Malanday, San Roque, Santa Elena, Santo Niño, Tañong
2		Bayani Fernando (1946–2023)	June 30, 2016	June 30, 2022	17th	PDP–Laban	Elected in 2016.	2007–present Barangka, Calumpang, Industrial Valley Complex, Jesus de la Peña, Malanday, San Roque, Santa Elena, Santo Niño, Tañong
2		Bayani Fernando (1946–2023)	June 30, 2016	June 30, 2022	18th	NPC	Re-elected in 2019.	2007–present Barangka, Calumpang, Industrial Valley Complex, Jesus de la Peña, Malanday, San Roque, Santa Elena, Santo Niño, Tañong
3		Maan Teodoro (born 1981)	June 30, 2022	June 30, 2025	19th	UNA	Elected in 2022.	2007–present Barangka, Calumpang, Industrial Valley Complex, Jesus de la Peña, Malanday, San Roque, Santa Elena, Santo Niño, Tañong
3		Maan Teodoro (born 1981)	June 30, 2022	June 30, 2025	19th	NUP	Elected in 2022.	2007–present Barangka, Calumpang, Industrial Valley Complex, Jesus de la Peña, Malanday, San Roque, Santa Elena, Santo Niño, Tañong
(1)		Marcelino Teodoro (born 1970)	July 1, 2025	Incumbent	20th	NUP	Elected in 2025. Proclamation deferred until resolution of pending residency dispute.	2007–present Barangka, Calumpang, Industrial Valley Complex, Jesus de la Peña, Malanday, San Roque, Santa Elena, Santo Niño, Tañong

== Election results ==
=== 2025 ===
2025 Philippine House of Representatives election in Marikina's 1st district
Candidate	Party	Votes	%
Marcelino Teodoro	National Unity Party	78,705	72.29
Koko Pimentel	Nacionalista	30,165	27.71
Total		108,870	100.00
Registered voters/turnout		127,290	–
NUP hold			

=== 2022 ===
2022 Philippine House of Representatives election in Marikina's 1st district
Party	Candidate	Votes	%
UNA	Maan Teodoro	68,572	73.61%
NPC	Migoy Cadiz	24,584	26.39%
Total votes		93,156	100%
UNA gain from NPC			

=== 2019 ===
2019 Philippine House of Representatives election in Marikina's 1st district
Party	Candidate	Votes	%
NPC	Bayani Fernando (incumbent)	56,553	80.46
Liberal	Jose Fabian Cadiz	13,732	19.54
Total votes		70,285	100.00
NPC hold			

=== 2016 ===
2016 Philippine House of Representatives election in Marikina's 1st District
Party	Candidate	Votes	%
NPC	Bayani Fernando	43,127	54.21%
Liberal	Samuel Ferriol	29,619	37.23%
Independent	Jopet Sison	3,490	4.39%
Margin of victory		13,508	16.98%
Valid ballots		76,236	95.83%
Invalid or blank votes		3,321	4.17%
Total votes		79,557	100%
NPC hold			

=== 2013 ===
2013 Philippine House of Representatives Election Results in Marikina's 1st District
Party	Candidate	Votes	%
Liberal	Marcelino Teodoro (incumbent)	58,123	89.54
Invalid or blank votes		6,787	10.46
Total votes		64,910	100.00
Liberal hold			

=== 2010 ===
2010 Philippine House of Representatives elections in Marikina's 1st district
Party	Candidate	Votes	%
Independent	Marcelino Teodoro (incumbent)	47,425	67.48
Liberal	Samuel Ferriol	22,232	31.63
Lakas–Kampi	Garizaldy Dela Paz	338	0.48
Independent	Alfredo Fajardo	175	0.25
Independent	Daniel Casuga	110	0.16
Valid ballots		70,280	96.04
Invalid or blank votes		2,897	3.96
Total votes		70,280	100.00
Independent hold			

== See also ==
- Legislative districts of Marikina
