= Marikina River Park =

Natural park in Metro Manila, Philippines

- Location within Metro Manila Location within Luzon Location within Philippines
- Type: Urban Park
- Location: 300 Shoe Ave, Santo Niño, Marikina, Philippines
- Coordinates: 14°37′47″N 121°5′3″E
- Area: 220 hectares (540 acres)
- Created: 1993
- Administrator: Marikina River Park Authority
- Public transit: Santolan
- Website: www.marikina.gov.ph

The Marikina River Park is a system of parks, trails, open spaces and recreation facilities along an 11-kilometer (6.8 mi) stretch of the Marikina River in Marikina, eastern Metro Manila, Philippines. The urban riverside park covers an area of 220 hectares (540 acres) running through the villages of Santo Niño, Santa Elena, Jesus de la Peña, San Roque, Calumpang, Barangka and Industrial Valley Complex in the western part of the city. The park, under development since 1993, is the city's biggest recreational and sports area containing the Riverbanks Center, a mall and office complex, and the biggest roller skating rink in the Philippines. It is a popular area for camping, jogging, biking and other outdoor activities not just for Marikina residents but also for those from nearby cities in Metro Manila.

== History ==
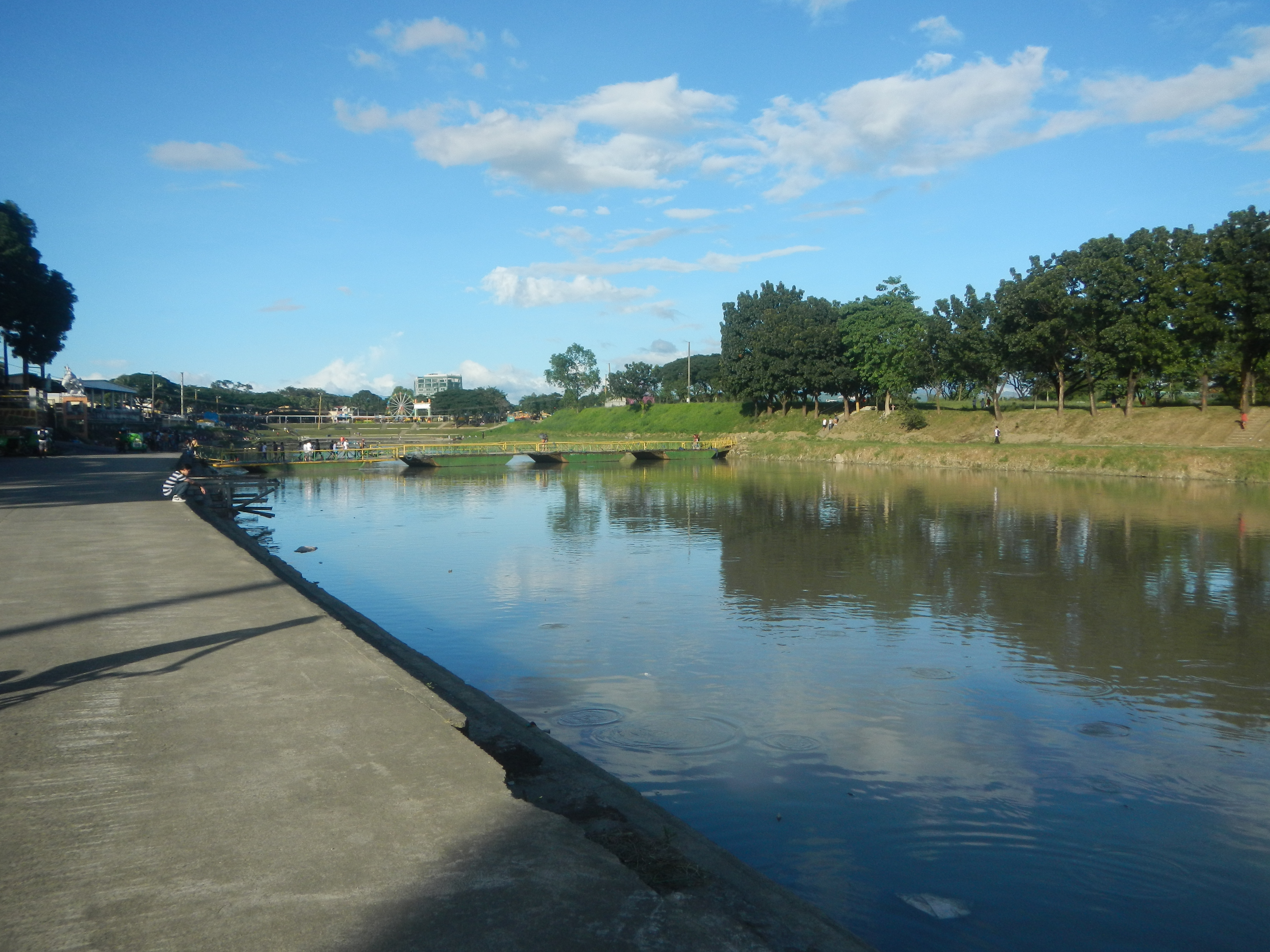
The park beside the Riverbanks Center

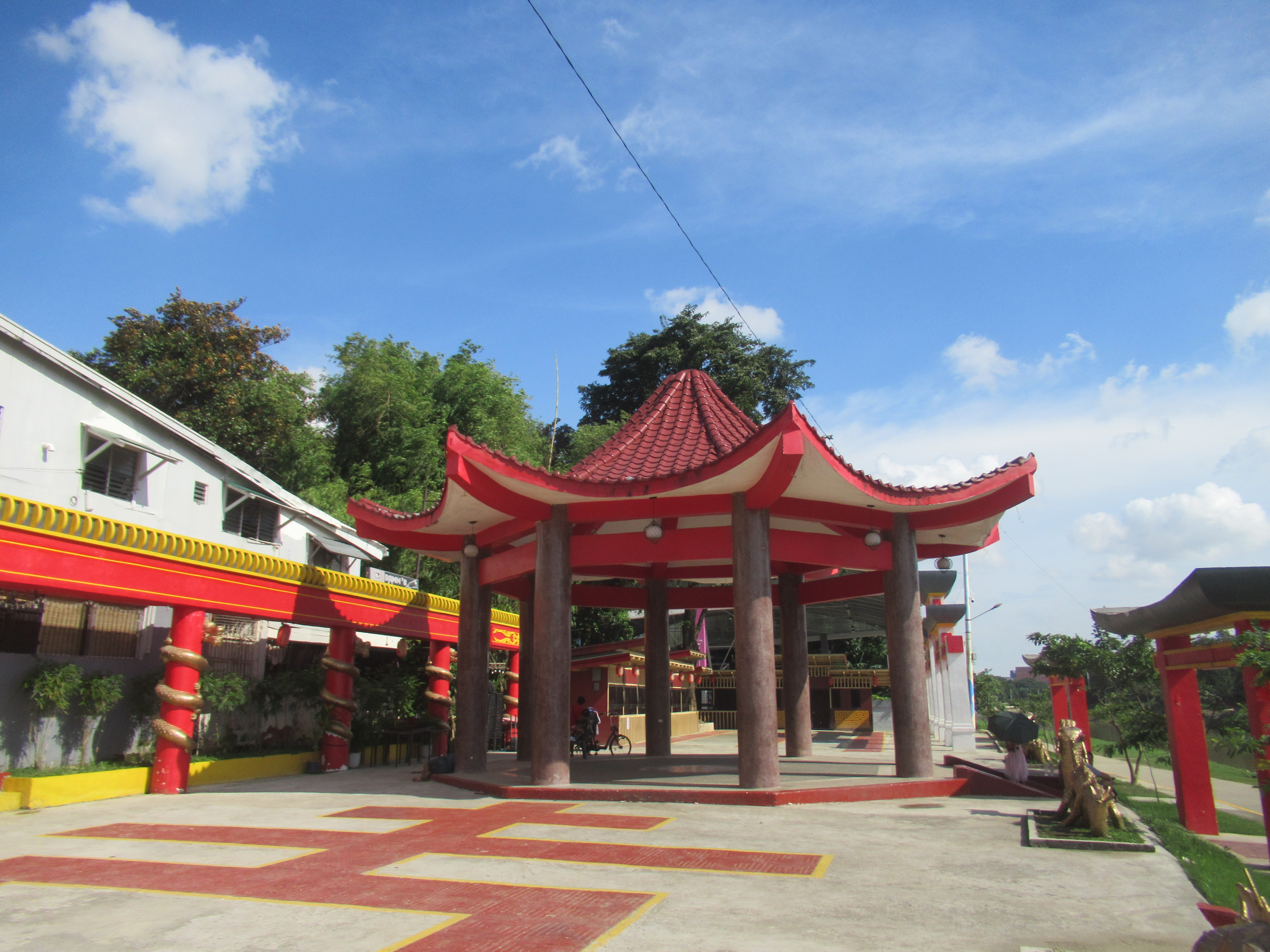
Chinese Pagoda

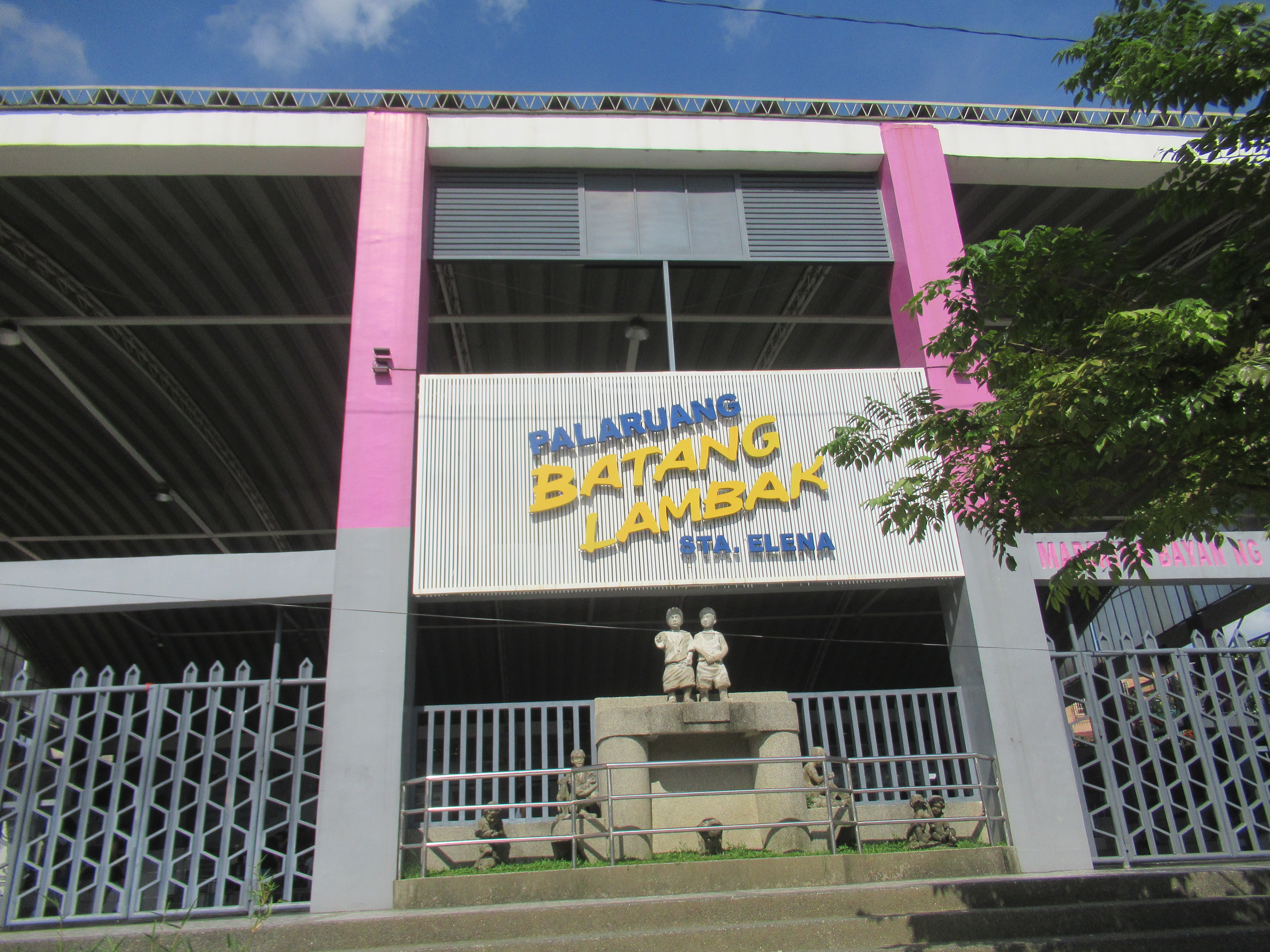
Palaruang Batang Lambak

The park was developed as part of a rehabilitation program called Save the Marikina River Program by the Marikina city government. Launched in 1993, the program aims to reduce flooding and improve the Marikina riverbanks for better water discharge after a 1992 flood left 25% of the city under floodwater. The program involved building access roads to the banks to allow for the cleaning and clearing operations, clearing the banks of informal settlers and other encroachments, demanding the local industries along the riverbanks to set up water treatment facilities in order improve the river's water quality, planting various flora and building cultural, sports and other historical structures to draw residents back to the river.

== Events and facilities ==
The Marikina River Park today is a focal point for community and cultural activities. It hosts the annual Mama Mary Fluvial Parade and Festival and the Marikina Christmas Festival. It has an amphitheater, floating stages for cultural events, a Roman Garden, Chinese Pagoda, a gazebo, riverboats and picnic grounds. It also features an Animal Trail featuring different concrete statues of different animals and several pontoon bridges located across different parts of the river. Sports facilities include a baseball field, a basketball court and a skating rink. A youth camp and a senior citizens lifestyle center can also be found in the park.

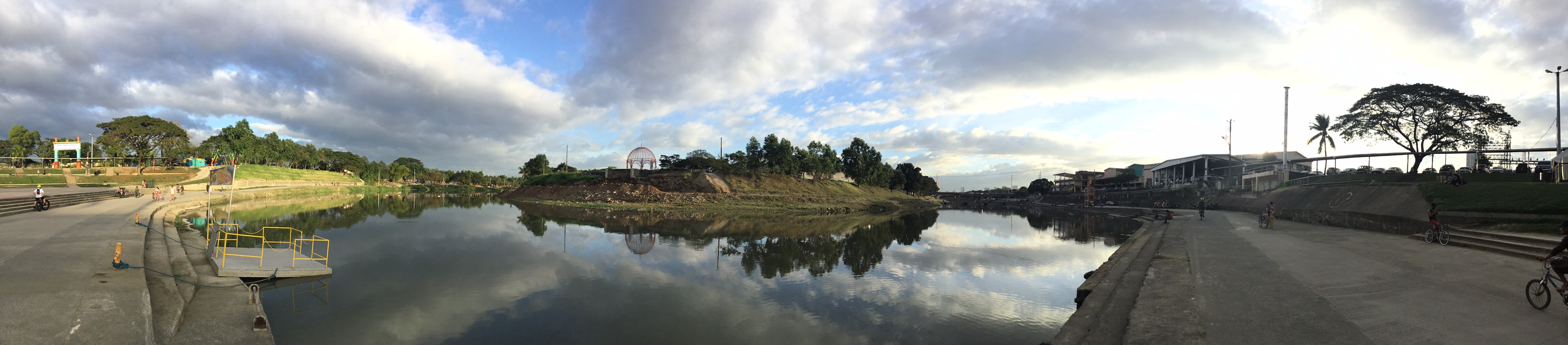
Panorama of Marikina River Park
