= Calumpang, Marikina =

Barangay in Marikina City, Metro Manila, Philippines

Calumpang Kalumpang
- Barangay
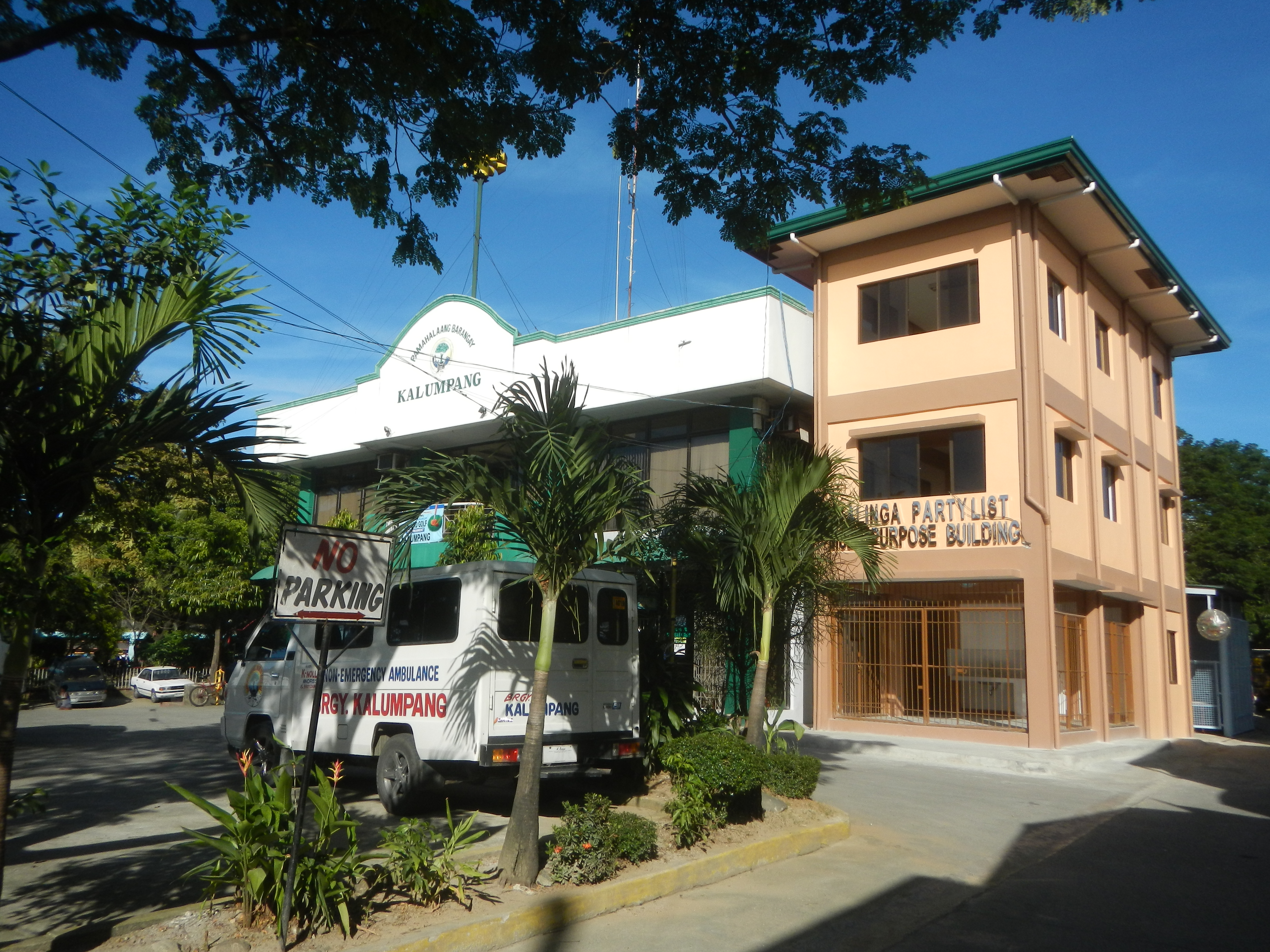
- Calumpang Barangay Hall
- Interactive map of Calumpang
- Location within Metro Manila
- Coordinates: 14°37′29.72″N 121°5′11.52″E
- Country: Philippines
- Region: National Capital Region
- City: Marikina
- District: 1st Legislative district of Marikina

Government
  - Type: Barangay
  - Barangay Captain: Mario M. De Leon
  - Barangay Councilor: Alek Antonio R. Andres; Blynisa S. Reas; Ferdinand "Nandy" A. Reyes; Enrico T. Chu; Rubie C. De Leon; Ricky "Lotto" M. De Guzman; Anthony "Niño" G. Reyes
  - SK Chairman: Jana Katrina Y. Enriquez

Area
  - Land: 0.72 km^{2} (0.28 sq mi)

Population (2020)
  - Total: 15,602
  - Density: 22,000/km^{2} (56,000/sq mi)
- Time zone: UTC+8 (PST)
- Postal Code: 1801
- Area code: 02

Calumpang (Tagalog: Kalumpang) is one of the barangays of Marikina. It is bounded to the north by Barangay Tanong, west by Barangay Barangka, south by Santolan, Pasig and east by Barangay San Roque. It is named after a wild almond, Sterculia foetida.

== Place of interest ==
=== Community facilities ===
- Kalumpang Barangay Hall
- Kalumpang Health Center
- Kalumpang Gym
- Kalumpang Multipurpose Hall
- Kalumpang Police Station
- Kalumpang Learning Center

=== Landmarks and buildings ===
- SM City Marikina
- Marikina River Park
- Santolan station
- BFCT East Transport Terminal
- Handog Center

=== Schools ===
- Kalumpang Elementary School
- Kalumpang National High School
- APEC Schools
- Jesus Flock Academy Foundation, Inc.
- Sta. Clara Academy
- Bright Star Learning Center

=== Churches ===
- San Antonio de Padua Parish
- Iglesia ni Cristo
- Ang Dating Daan

=== Primary streets ===
- J.P. Rizal Street
- General F. Santos Street
- M.A. Roxas Street
- J.M. Basa Street
- M.H. Del Pilar Street
- Kagitingan Street
- I. Senga Street
- Old J.P. Rizal Street

=== Roads and bridges ===
- Marcos Highway Bridge
- Diosdado Macapagal Bridge (C5-Marcos Highway Bridge)
- Line 2 Bridge
- Marcos Highway
