= Zamora House (Marikina) =

House in Marikina, Philippines

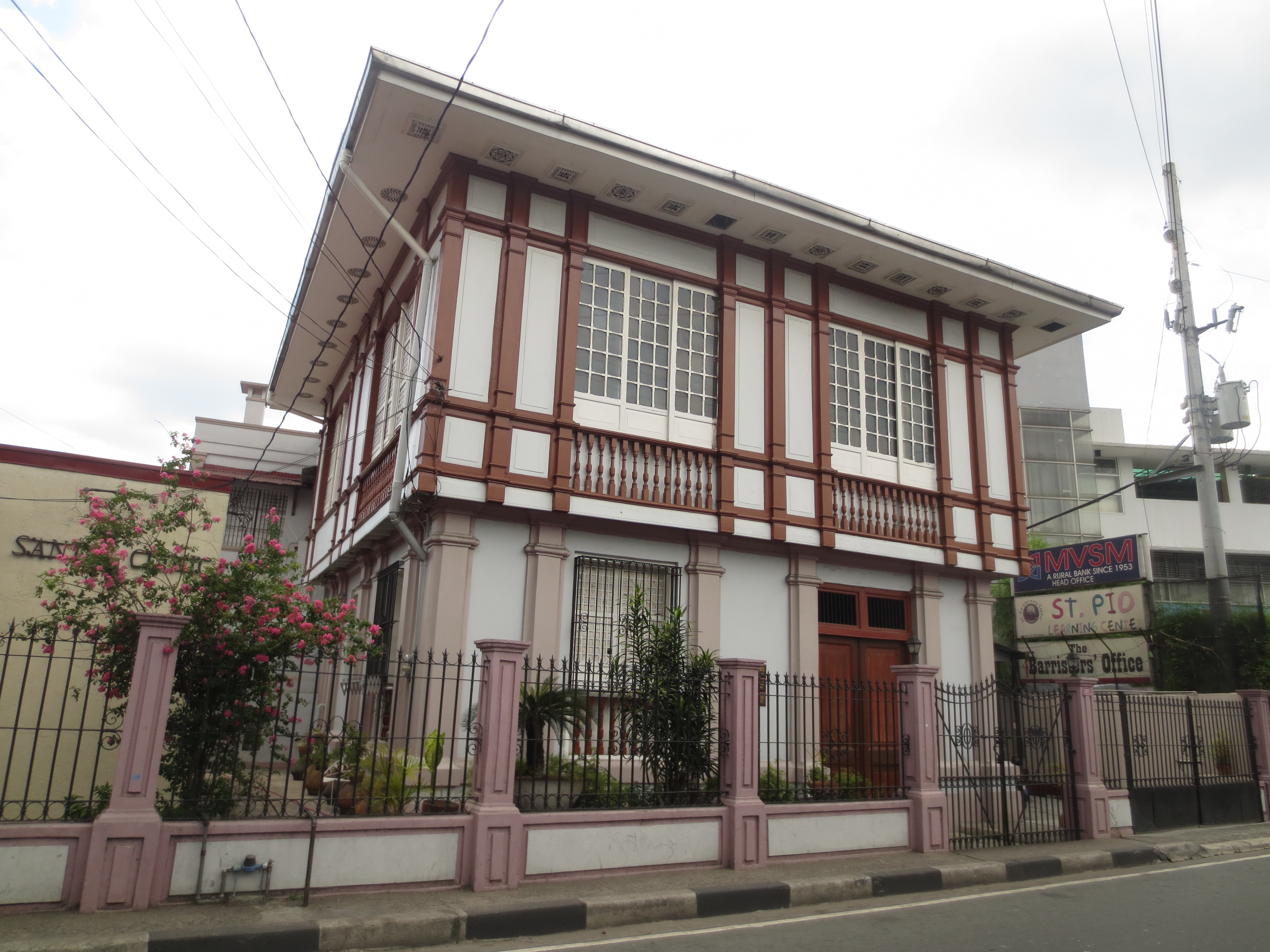
A view of the Zamora House from across the street.

The Domingo Zamora House, also known as the Santos House, is a residential building which can be found in the village of Santo Niño in Marikina, Metro Manila, Philippines. It was built in 1890 by Domingo Zamora, a known Filipino nationalist and one of the founders of the Iglesia Pilipina Independiente, a religious movement which emerged during the Spanish rule that advocates the Filipinization of the Church.

== History ==
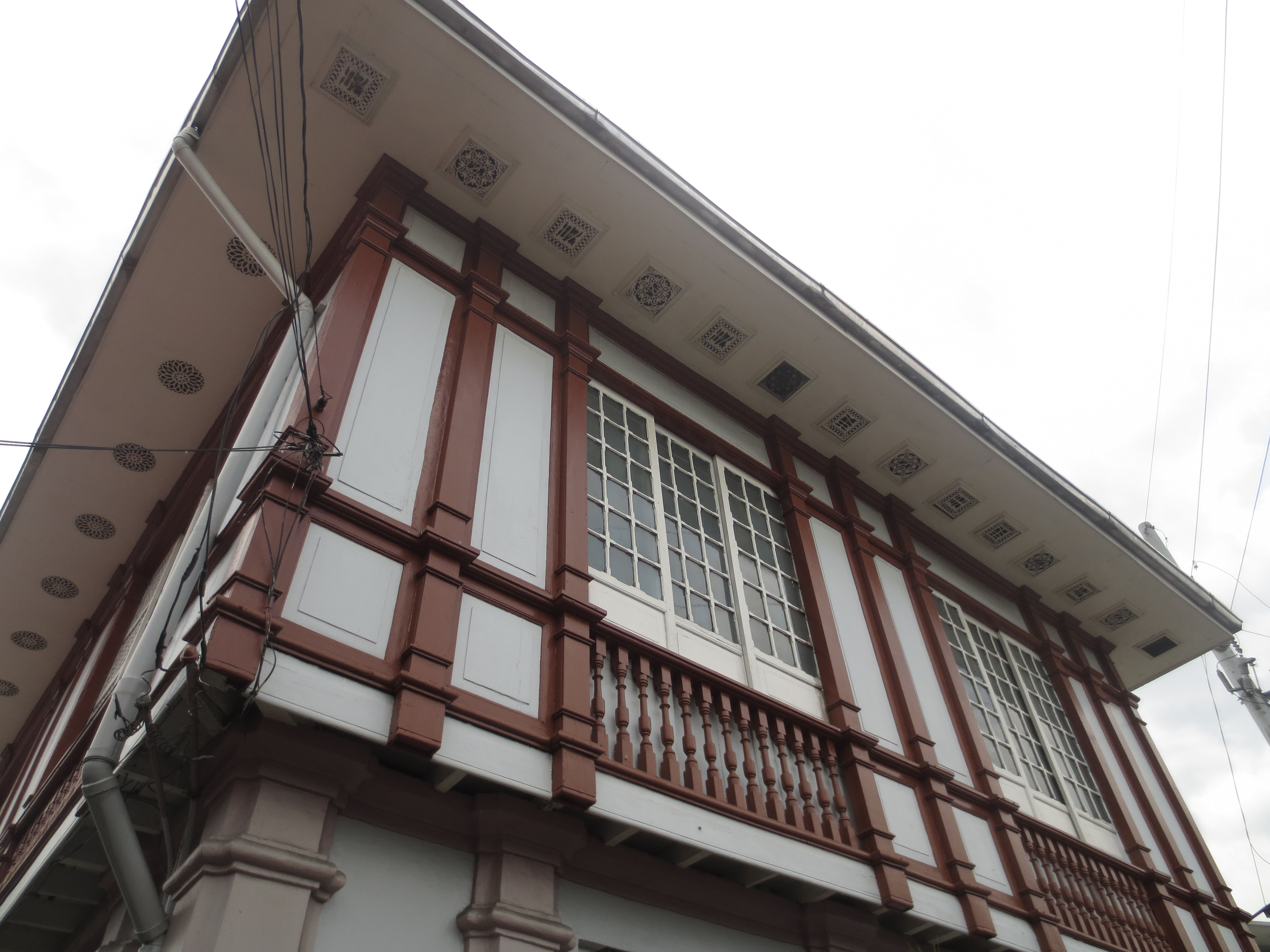
A closer view of the Zamora house. Note the wooden carvings under the eaves of the roofing.

The materials used to construct the house was said to come from the drifting logs that float on the Marikina River from Rodriguez (formerly Montalban). Indigenous tribes such as the Aetas used to gather wood from the river and sell it to the settlers. In 1890, Domingo Zamora, whose elder brother Felipe Zamora was one of Rizal's co-propagandists in Madrid, Spain, constructed a military headquarters and garrison in guise of a residential house. Zamora is also a founder of the Iglesia Pilipina Independiente whose origin traces back from the struggle of the Filipino clergy against racial discrimination and friar domination within the Roman Church in the 19th century. Eventually, it turned into a nationalist crusade for the absolute Filipinization of the Church. During World War II, Japanese soldiers used the house as their headquarters.

The house survived the destruction and bombing during the Liberation of the American forces and was used as a relief center for the war victims in which rice and other staple food are distributed.

The ownership of the house was passed down to the side of Domingo Zamora's wife who came from a family of physicians. It is currently inhabited by the Santos family who also utilized a part of the house as a clinic.

== Architecture ==
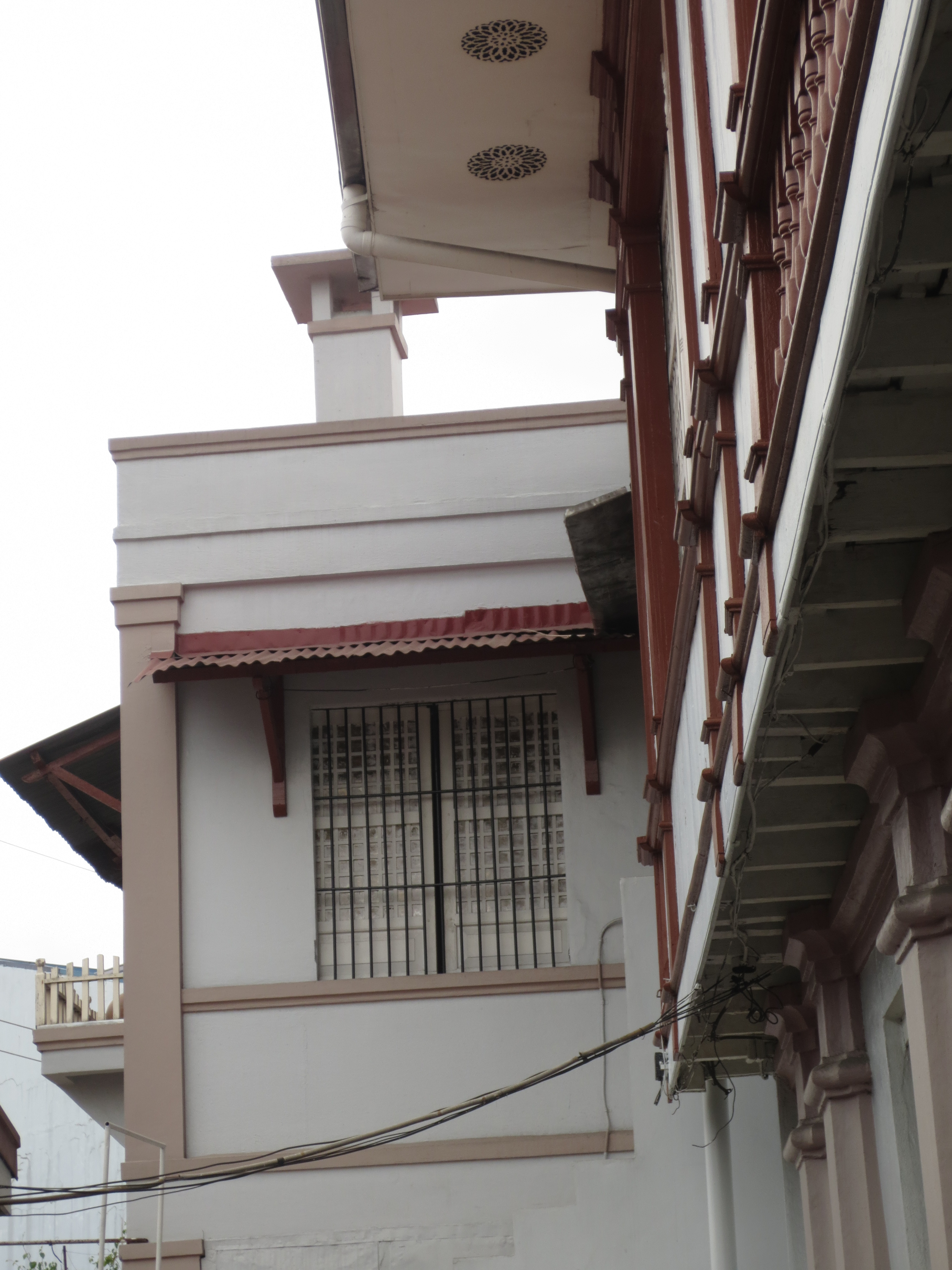
The tangka or chimney at the back of the Zamora house.

The house is an example of a neo-classical bahay na bato with its use of pilaster, a classical architectural feature attached to the wall for decoration and support. Intricately designed carvings can be seen below the eaves of the roof. A notable feature of the house is the presence of a tangka or chimney at the back of the house, which was considered to be revolutionary back in its days. The interior is characterized with a high ceiling to allow natural ventilation.

== See also ==
- Our Lady of the Abandoned Parish
- List of landmarks and attractions of Marikina
- Sta. Elena, Marikina
