= Barangka =

Barangay in Marikina, Metro Manila, Philippines

- Barangay
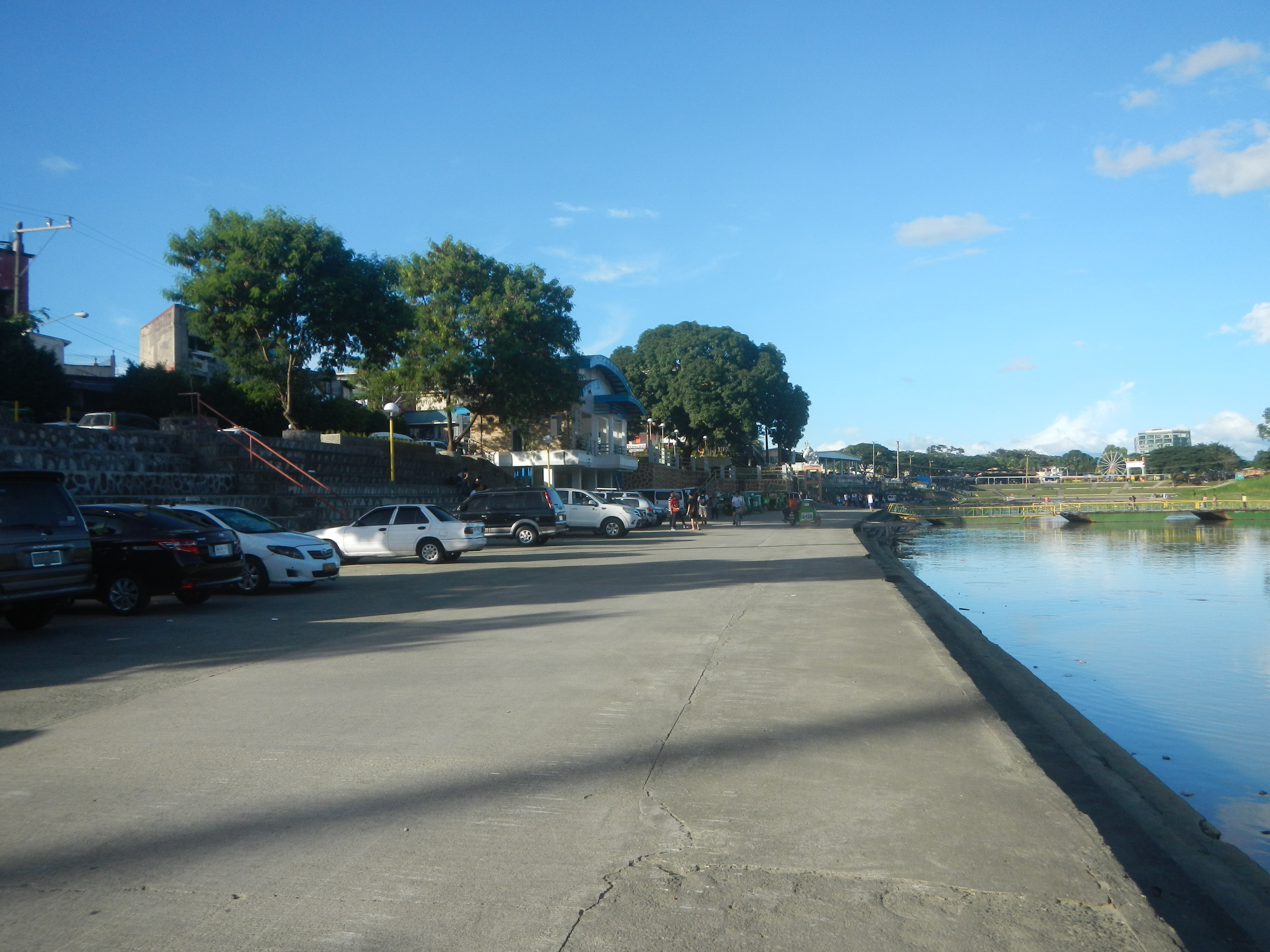
- Western bank of Marikina River at Barangka
- Interactive map of Barangka
- Location within Metro Manila
- Coordinates: 14°37′47″N 121°4′49″E
- Country: Philippines
- Region: National Capital Region
- City: Marikina
- District: 1st Legislative district of Marikina
- Established (as barangay): June 21, 1959

Government
  - Type: Barangay
  - Punong Barangay: Efren Managuit

Population (2020)
  - Total: 16,639
- Time zone: UTC+8 (PST)
- Postal Code: 1803
- Area code: 02

Barangka is an urban barangay in Marikina, Metro Manila, Philippines. It is part of the 1st district of Marikina and the site of the earliest historical origins of Marikina.

Located along the southwestern border of Marikina, with the Marikina–Infanta Highway and A. Bonifacio Avenue, which serve as thoroughfares connecting Quezon City and Marikina, and with the municipalities of San Mateo and Rodriguez (Montalban) in Rizal to the east, Barangka is considered to be a gateway for people going to and from Metro Manila and Rizal. It is bordered on the west by barangay Loyola Heights in Quezon City; to the south by barangays Industrial Valley and Calumpang; to the east by barangay Tañong; and to the north by Loyola Grand Villas.

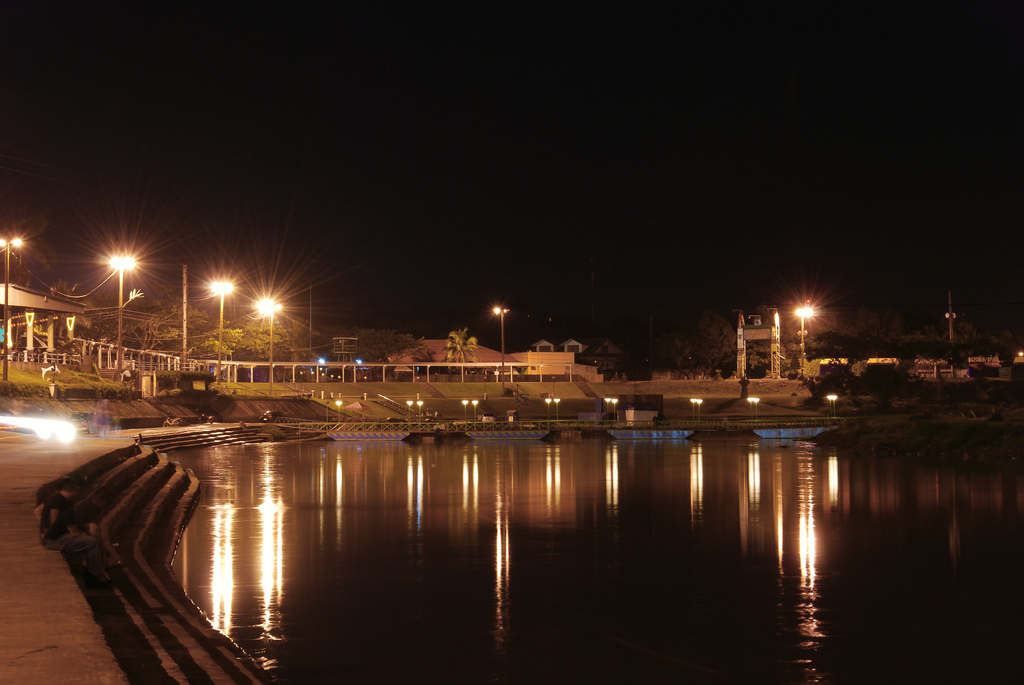
Riverbanks Center at night

== Etymology ==
Barangka takes its name from the Spanish word for "canyon", barranca, owing to the area's steep and hilly terrain.

== History ==
The area of Barangay Barangka is considered one of the earliest historical origins of Marikina when the Augustinians and Jesuits arrived in the area called chorrillo, a small stream located in the area (now called Chorillo or official name called General Julian Cruz Street, a known street located in this barangay). From 1939 to 1941, the sitio was under the jurisdiction of the then-newly established Quezon City before it was returned to Marikina. According to a 1942 map, Barangka was part of the Diliman district of the City of Greater Manila, which included Quezon City throughout its existence from 1942 to 1945.

Along with former Parang and Nangka, the former sitio was elevated to barangay by virtue of Republic Act No. 2601, which was enacted on June 21, 1959.

== Geography ==
Barangka lies on the foothills of Quezon City and also over the West Valley fault systems. It has a total land area of 116.96 ha (1.17 km^{2}) with a population of 27,805, making it the mostly densely populated barangay in Marikina. The Marikina River where the Marikina River Park and Riverbanks Center is located borders the barangay to the south.

== Miscellaneous ==
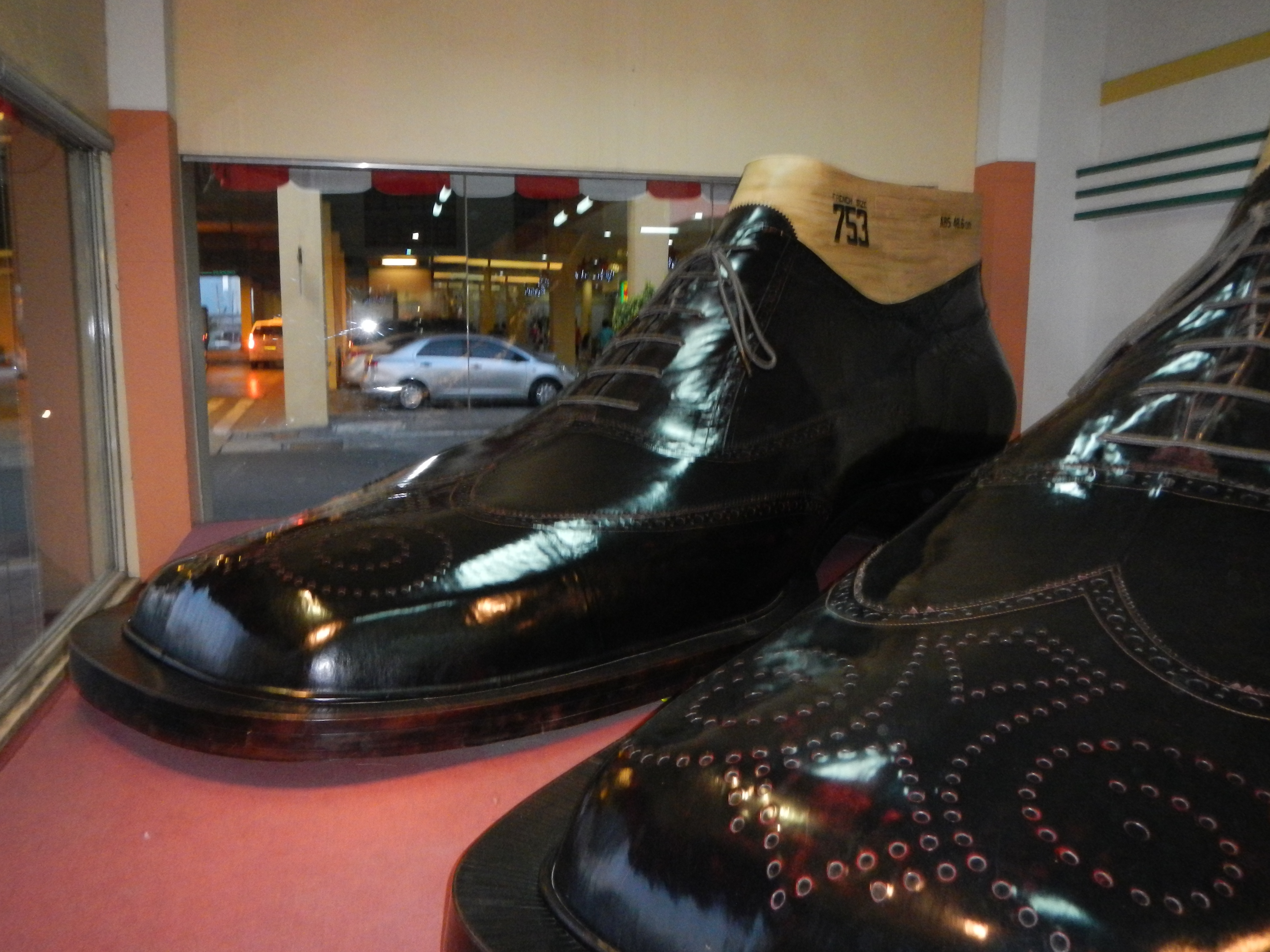
Largest pair of shoes displayed at Riverbanks Mall

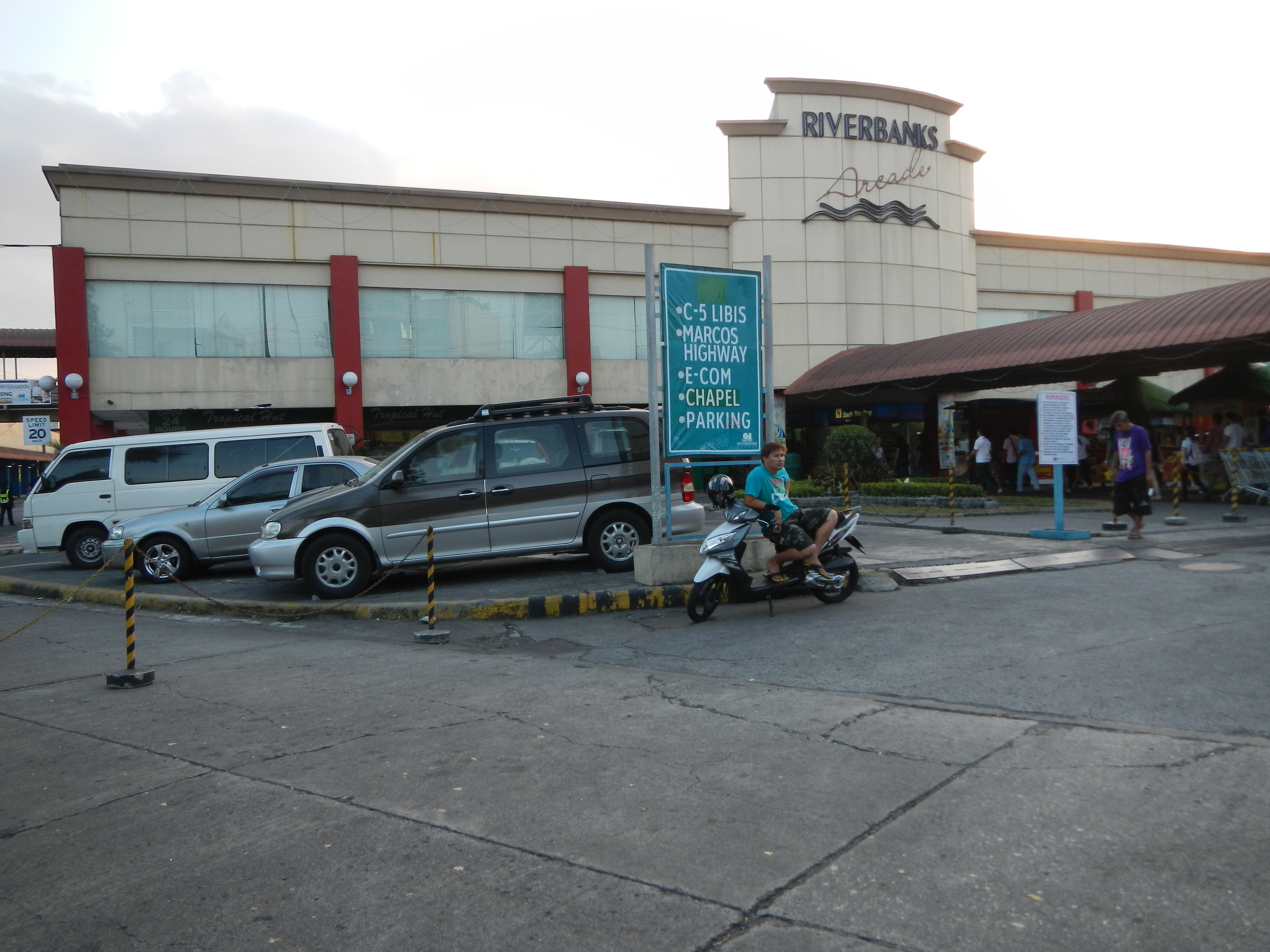
Riverbanks Arcade Building

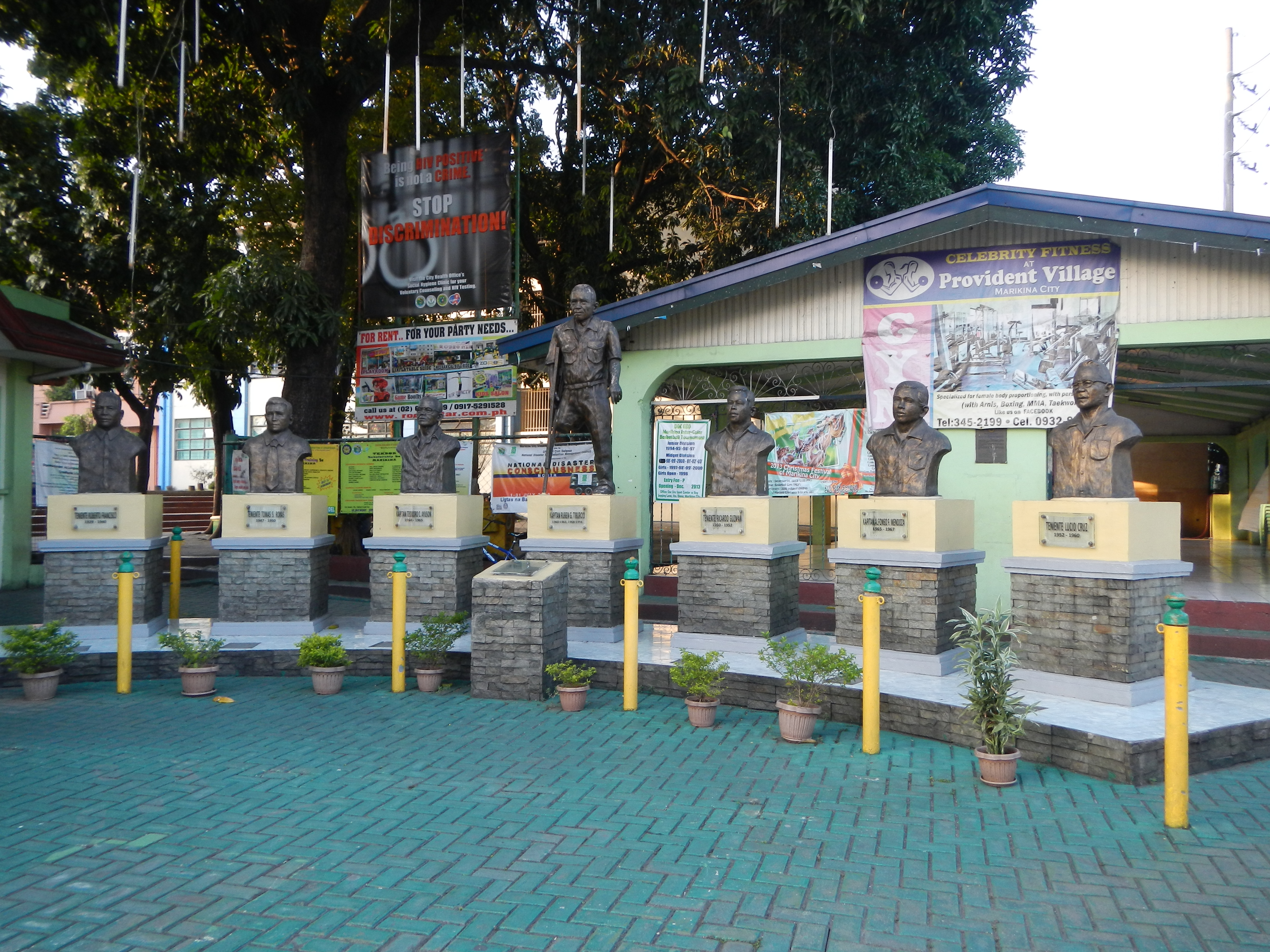
Plaza Delos Kapitanes

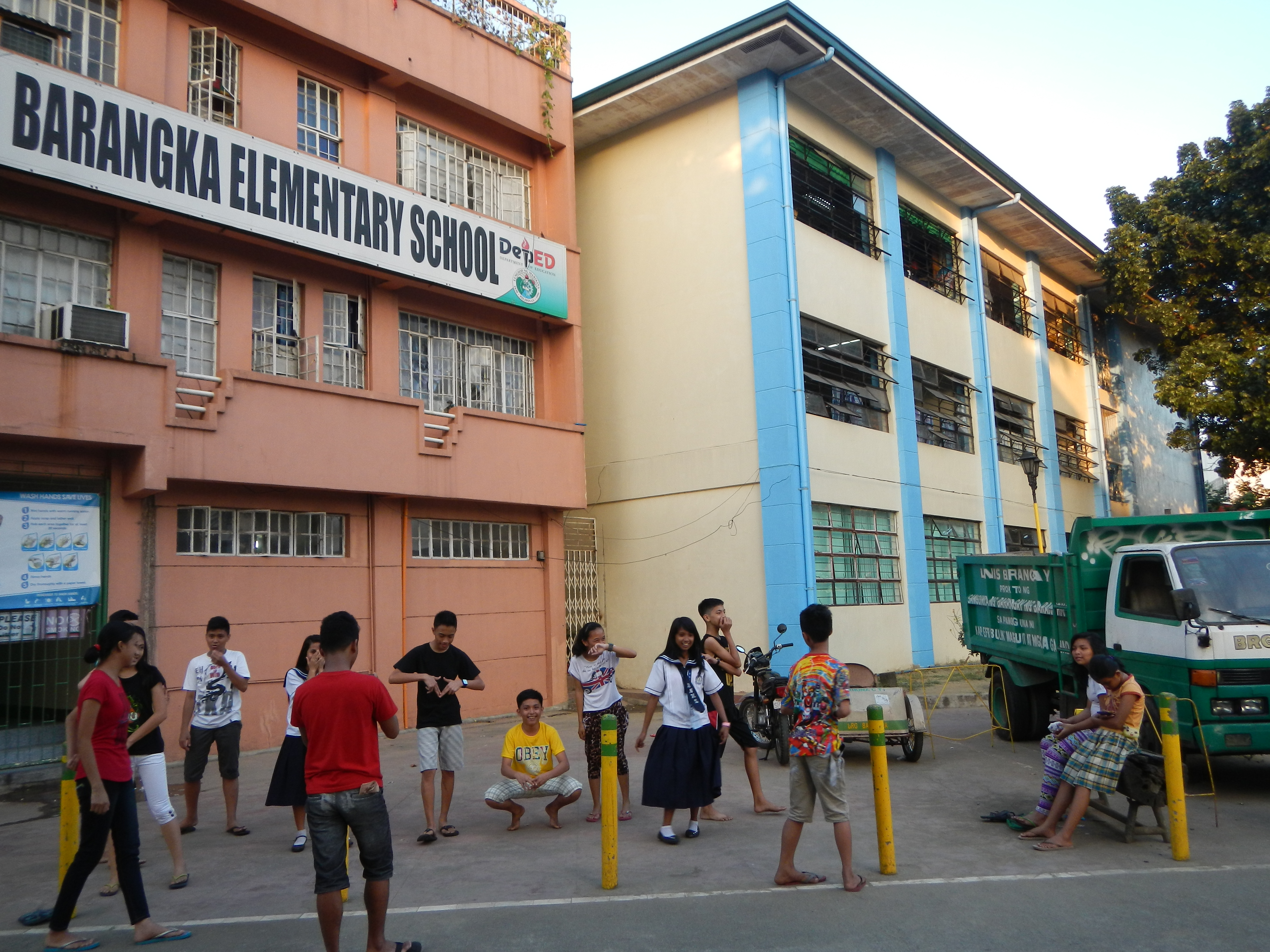
Barangka Elementary School and Barangka National High School

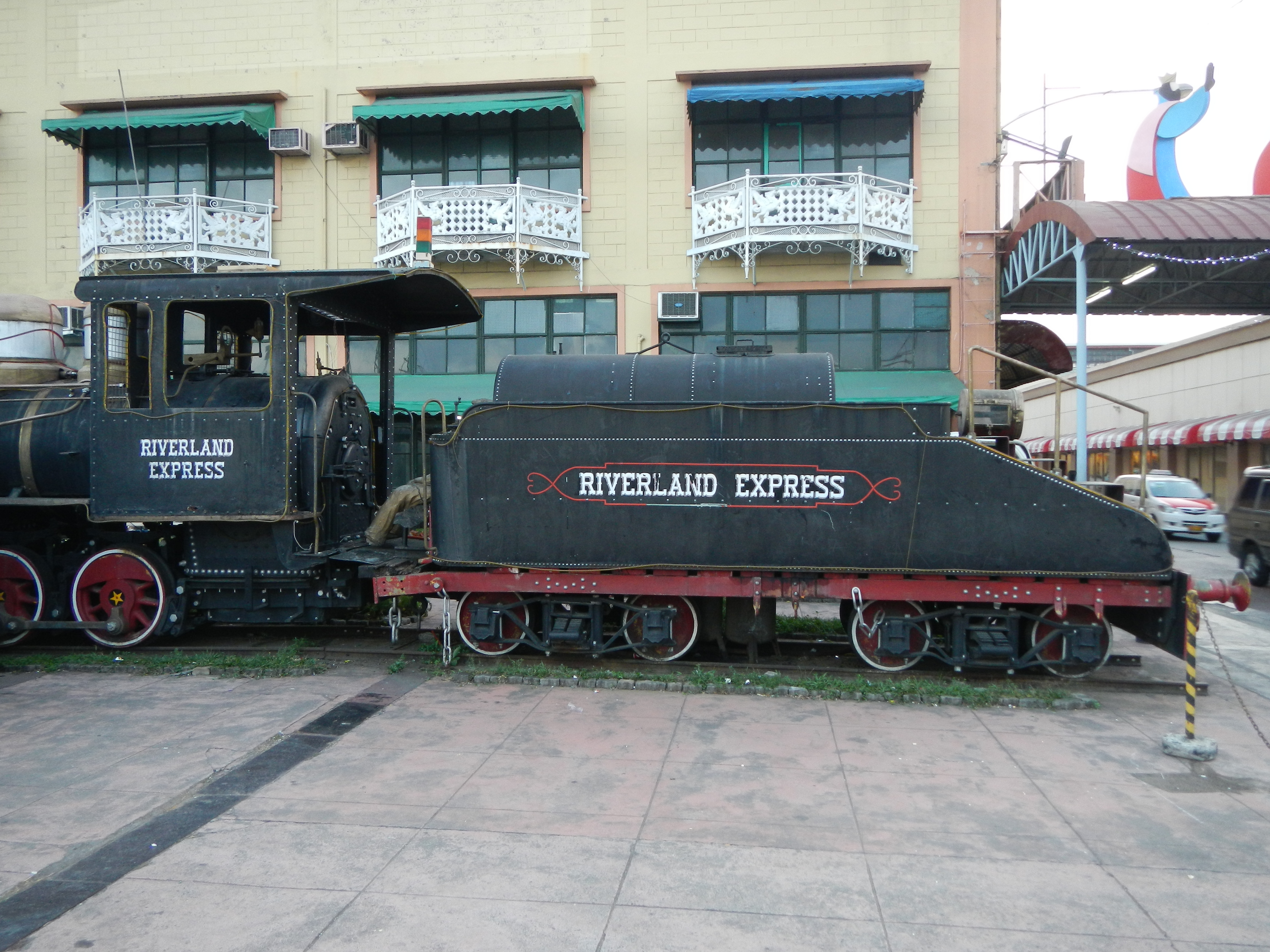
Riverland Express inside Riverbanks Center

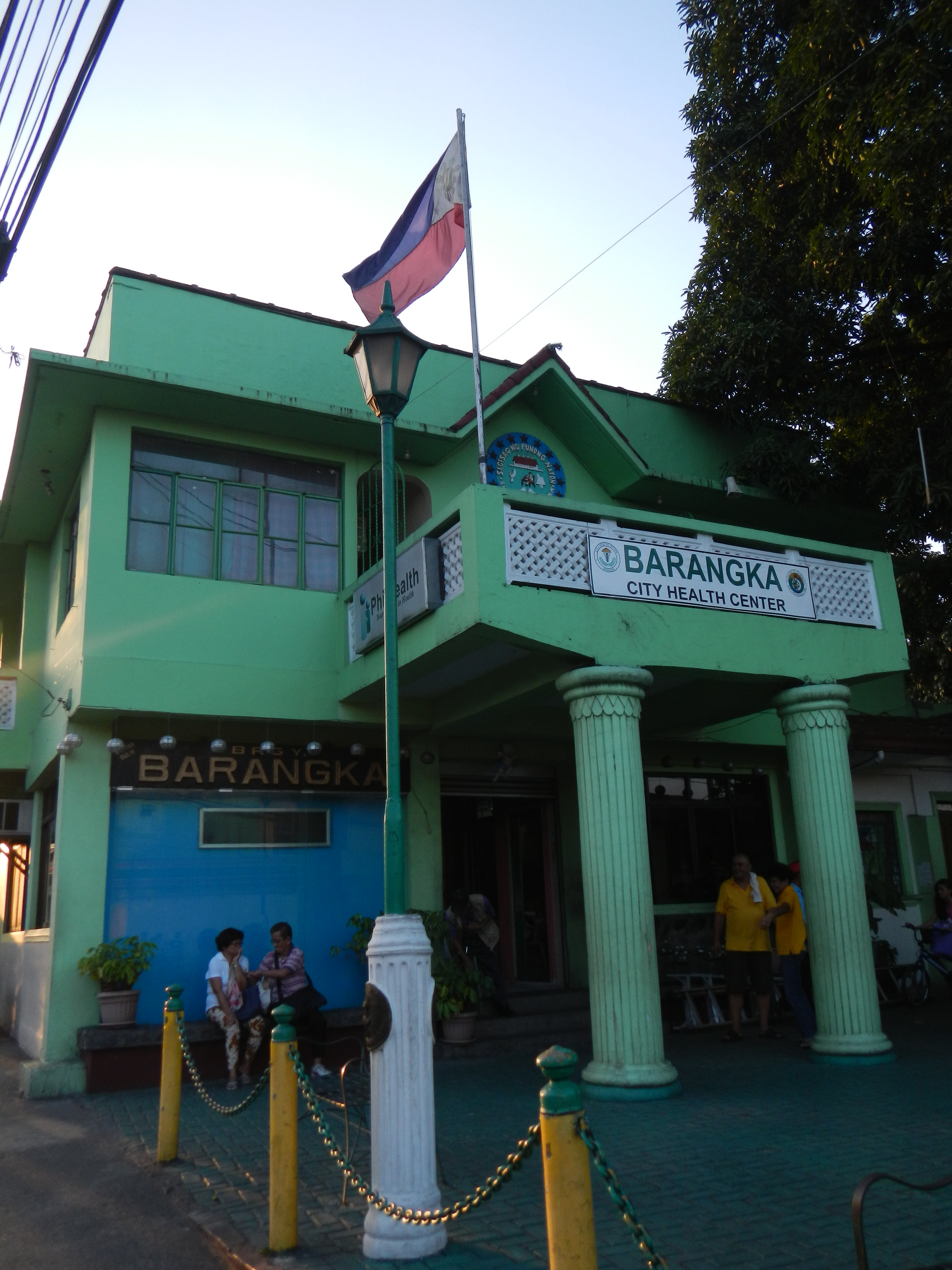
Barangay Hall, a community center

=== Villages and subdivisions ===
- Ateneo Housing
- Dela Costa Homes
- Landless Barangka
- Loyola Subdivision
- Loyola Grand Villas
- Urban Bliss

=== Community facilities ===
- Barangka Barangay Hall and Town Plaza
- Barangka City Health Center
- Barangka Covered Gymnasium
- Barangka Multipurpose Hall
- Barangka Police Station
- Barangka Public Cemetery
- Barangka Workshop and Fitness Center
- Dela Costa Homes Community Center
- Dela Costa Homes Covered Gymnasium
- Urban Bliss Covered Gymnasium
- Urban Bliss Multipurpose Hall

=== Landmarks and buildings ===
- Ateneo De Manila University (Marikina side)
  - Arrupe International Residences
  - Center for Family Ministries
  - San Jose Seminary
- Barangka Credit Cooperative Head Office
  - BCC Business Center
  - BCC Convention Center
- Col. San Pascual Building
- Loyola Memorial Park
  - Loyola Memorial Chapels and Crematorium
  - Loyola Memorial Park Administration Building
  - The Last Supper Memorial Monument
  - Plaza De Las Flores
- Plaza Delos Kapitanes
- Riverbanks Center
  - Courtyard Dormtel
  - E-Com Buildings (Main and Annex)
  - ICT Building
  - Marikina's Largest Pair of Shoes in the World
  - Marikina River Park
  - Philippine Science Centrum
  - Queen of Angels Chapel
  - Renaissance Convention Center and Ballroom
  - Riverbanks Activity Area and Open Bazaar
  - Riverbanks Amphitheater
  - Riverbanks Arcade Building
  - Riverbanks Covered Park
  - Riverbanks Development Corporation Main Office
  - Riverbanks Mall Complex
  - Riverbanks North Triangle open area
  - Riverbanks Plaza
  - Riverbanks Station

=== Schools ===
- Barangka Elementary School
- Barangka National High School
- Marikina Disciple Church Christian School
- Mother of Angels School
- Providence Christian School

=== Churches ===
- Iglesia ni Cristo Local ng Barangka, Marikina West
- Mary The Queen Chapel
- San Jose Manggagawa Chapel
- Queen of Angels Chapel Riverbanks

=== Roads ===
Major roads

- Marikina-Infanta Highway (Marcos Highway)
- Andres Bonifacio Avenue
- Riverbanks Avenue
- C-5 Access Road (access to Libis, Quezon City)
- FVR Road

Primary streets

- General Julian Cruz (Chorillo) Street
- Don Gonzalo Puyat Street
- Paspasan Street
- Saint Joseph Street (Dela Costa Homes)
- Berchmans Street
- Kabo Pio Street
- F. Tuazon Street
- Yen Street (UBB)

Bridges and overpasses

- Barangka Flyover
- Diosdado Macapagal Bridge
- Monte Vista Footbridge
- Marcos Bridge

== See also ==
- Marikina
- Riverbanks Center
