= Santa Elena, Marikina =

Barangay in Marikina City, Metro Manila, Philippines

Santa Elena
- Barangay
- Location within Metro Manila
- Coordinates: 14°37′57.41″N 121°6′0.52″E
- Country: Philippines
- Region: National Capital Region
- City: Marikina
- District: 1st Legislative district of Marikina

Government
  - Type: Barangay
  - Barangay Captain: Bernard Bernardo

Population (2010)
  - Total: 6,954
- Time zone: UTC+8 (PST)
- Postal Code: 1800
- Area code: 02

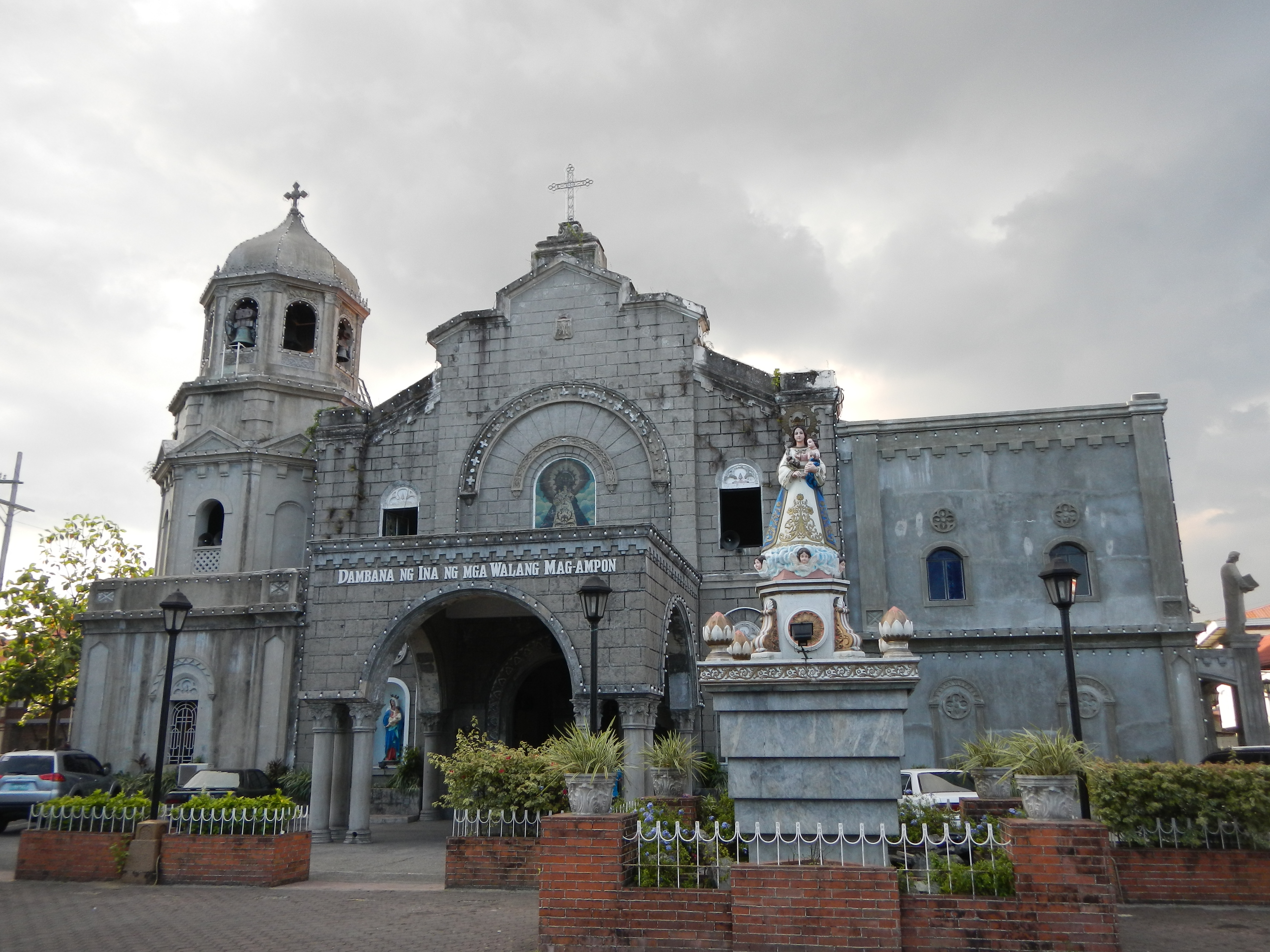
The Our Lady of the Abandoned Church, Sta. Elena, Marikina

Santa Elena is a barangay of Marikina, Philippines. According to the 2010 census, it has a population of 6,954 people. Bordered by San Roque, Jesus Dela Peña, and Santo Niño, Sta. Elena is said to be one of the first towns established by the Augustinians in what was known as the Marikina Valley and home for the heritage sites such as the Our Lady of the Abandoned Parish and the Kapitan Moy Residence.

== History ==
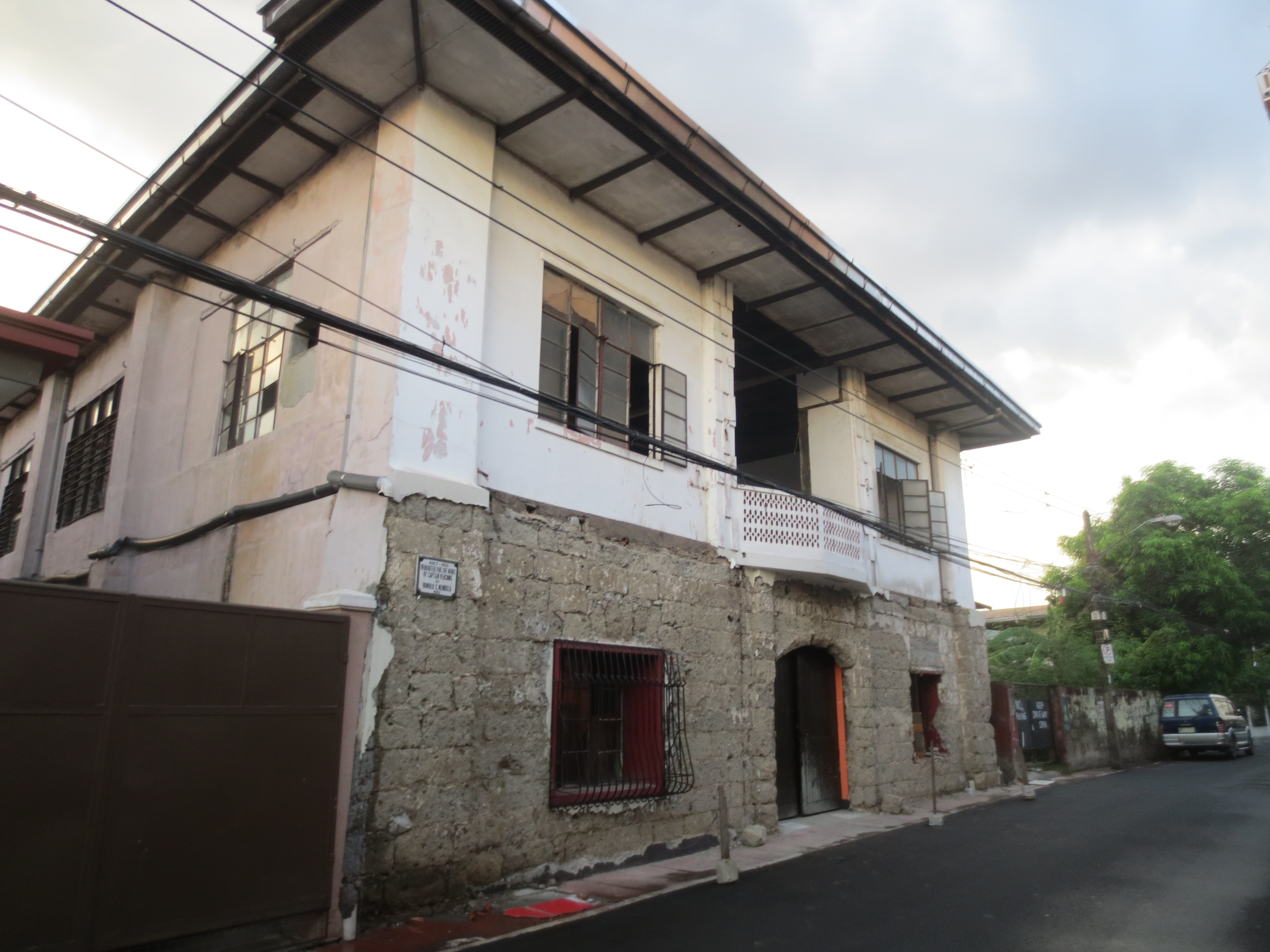
Capitan Venciong house, one of Marikina's oldest houses.

Records have shown that the barrio has traced its beginning in the year 1687, when the Jesuit missionaries crossed the river from Jesus Dela Peña, in search for a place to build a new church. According to a legend, the barrio got its name when the people saw a huge cross floating down the Marikina River. Many people dove into the water to get it ashore, but failed to do so. They then decided to build a chapel in honor of the mysterious cross. At first, the cross stood alone, but later the image of Sta. Elena appeared beside it. The last renovation for the chapel was done in 1945.

The peaceful life in the barrio was occasionally disturbed by minor natural catastrophes such as the earthquake in 1825 and 1880 and the fire of 1887 which nearly gutted down the house of Capitan Venciong. But the people considered the bombing of the combined soldiers of the American liberation Forces and the Philippine Commonwealth troops on February 10, 1945, as the worst tragedy in Sta. Elena's history.

Because of the construction of the Our Lady of the Abandoned Parish by the Augustinians in 1791, Sta. Elena soon emerged as the town's religious center.

== Famous people from Sta. Elena ==
Sta. Elena is known for its sons. Marikina's shoe legacy also began as it eventually grows into a prominent town center.

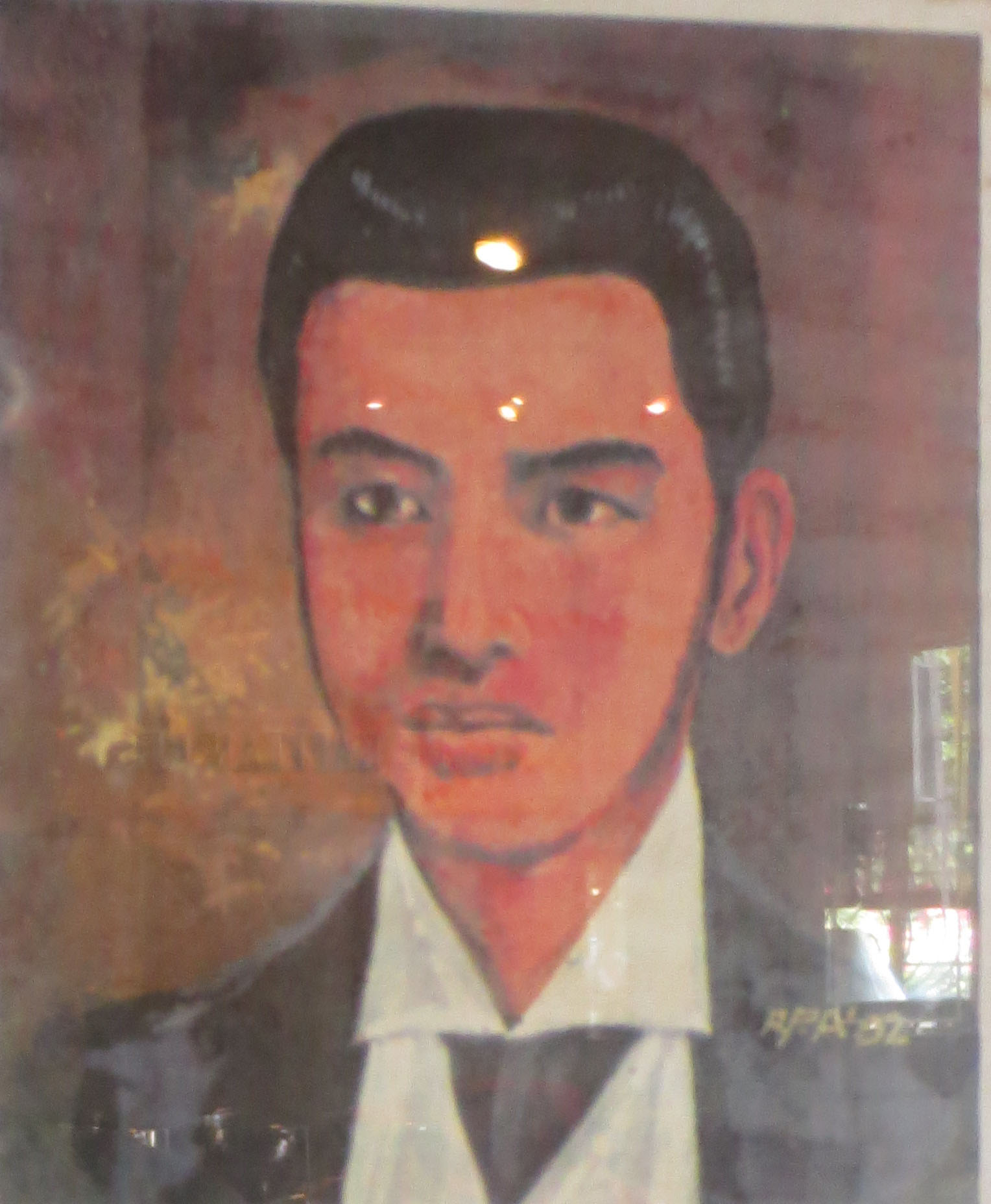
Kapitan Moy, the father of Marikina shoe industry.

- Laureano "Kapitan Moy" Guevarra - pioneer of the shoe-making industry.
- Potenciano Deguanco - the first pharmacist who graduated in the University of Santo Tomas in 1892. He then opened the first drug store, "FARMACIA MARIQUINA" in his house which was constructed during the Spanish period.
- Catalino Cruz - mayor of Marikina from 1912 to 1918. He also became the board member of the Provincial Board from 1919 to 1922 and was acting governor of Rizal in 1921–1922.
- Congressman Emilio de la Paz - lawyer-newspaperman who served as Representative of the 2nd district of Rizal for four terms.
- Wenceslao de la Paz - Founder of the Marikina Academy (1933), now Roosevelt College, mother school of many other educational institutions.

== Notable Places at Sta. Elena ==
Sta. Elena, being one of the earliest settlements developed by the Augustinian friars, is home to famous landmarks and cultural sites of Marikina. Here are various sites and places of interest found within the vicinity.

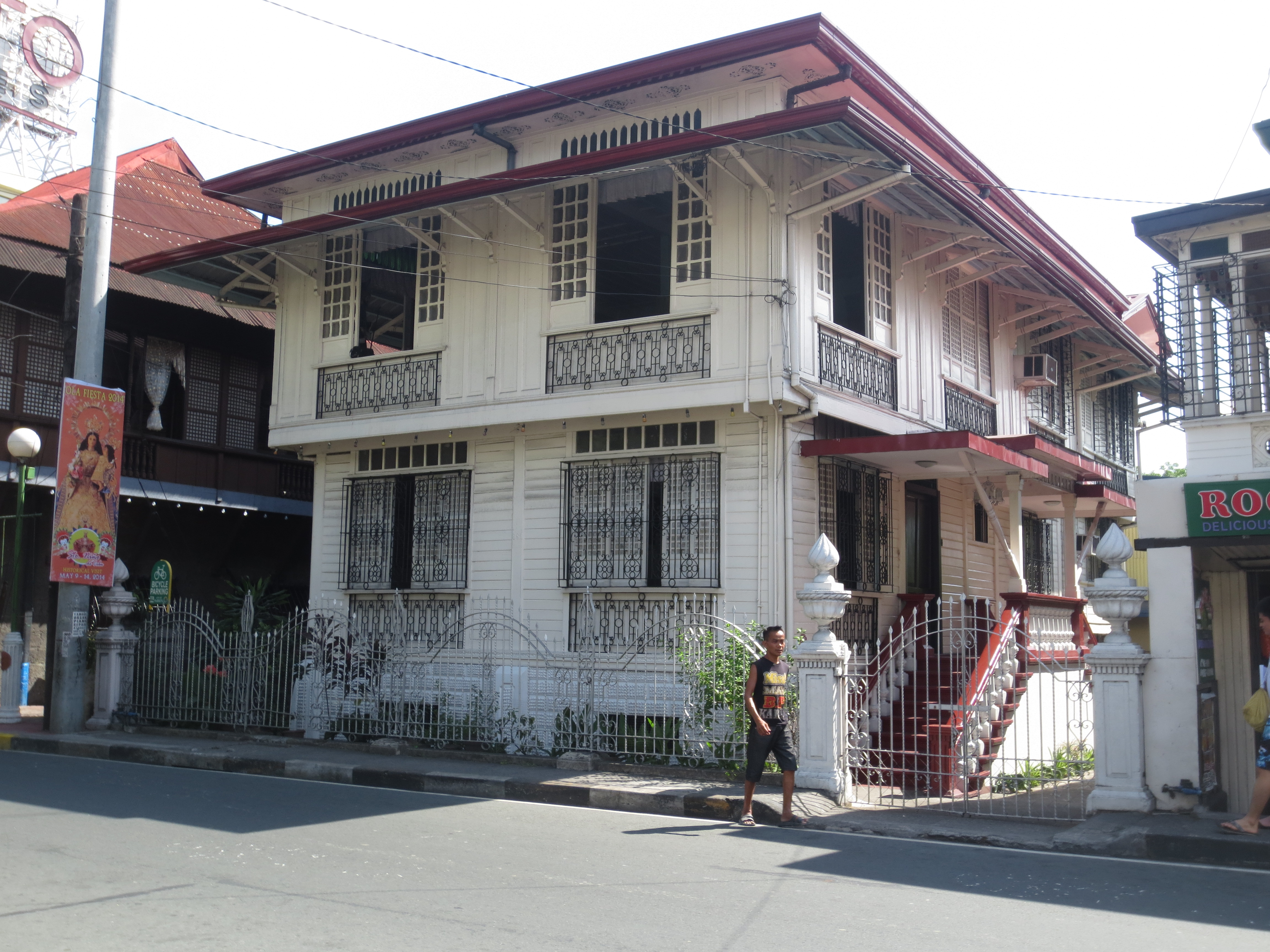
The Old Chanyungco House facing the street of J.P Rizal.

- Our Lady of the Abandoned Parish - It is a Roman Catholic church in Marikina which enshrines one of several images of the Virgin Mary venerated as miraculous, and which has received Papal recognition.
- The Old Chanyungco House - The house of one of Marikina's oldest families, the Chanyungcos, still stands today next to the Kapitan Moy Building in San Roque. It was built by a wealthy shoe manufacturer, Thomas Chanyungco of Jesus dela Pena whose father was pure Chinese. He also owned the then famous GANDARA shoes in Tondo, Manila. His descendants eventually became prominent in social and political circles. Built in the traditional Bahay na Bato with a hard foundation, the living quarters are made of wooden walls and partitioning topped with a roof of galvanized iron. The house borrows heavily from eclectic style characterized by the balustrade leading to the main doors, elaborate wooden engravings under the eaves of the roof and the volleda extending on the second floor.
- Vivencio "Capitan Venciong" Cruz House - considered to be one of the oldest houses in Marikina, it was built in 1851 and was renovated in 1962 for the heirs of the late patriarch.
- Dela Paz House (not to be confused with the dela Paz Mansion) - a house built in 1920 and owned by Pedro and Jule dela Paz-Tuason, it was used as a bazaar for agricultural tools and other supplies during the 1930s as Sta. Elena flourishes into a rich, busy town. Much of the house's old eclectic features are maintained by the family descendants, characterized by marble-sized, antique furniture and the wide lighting fixtures of the ceiling.

== Gallery ==
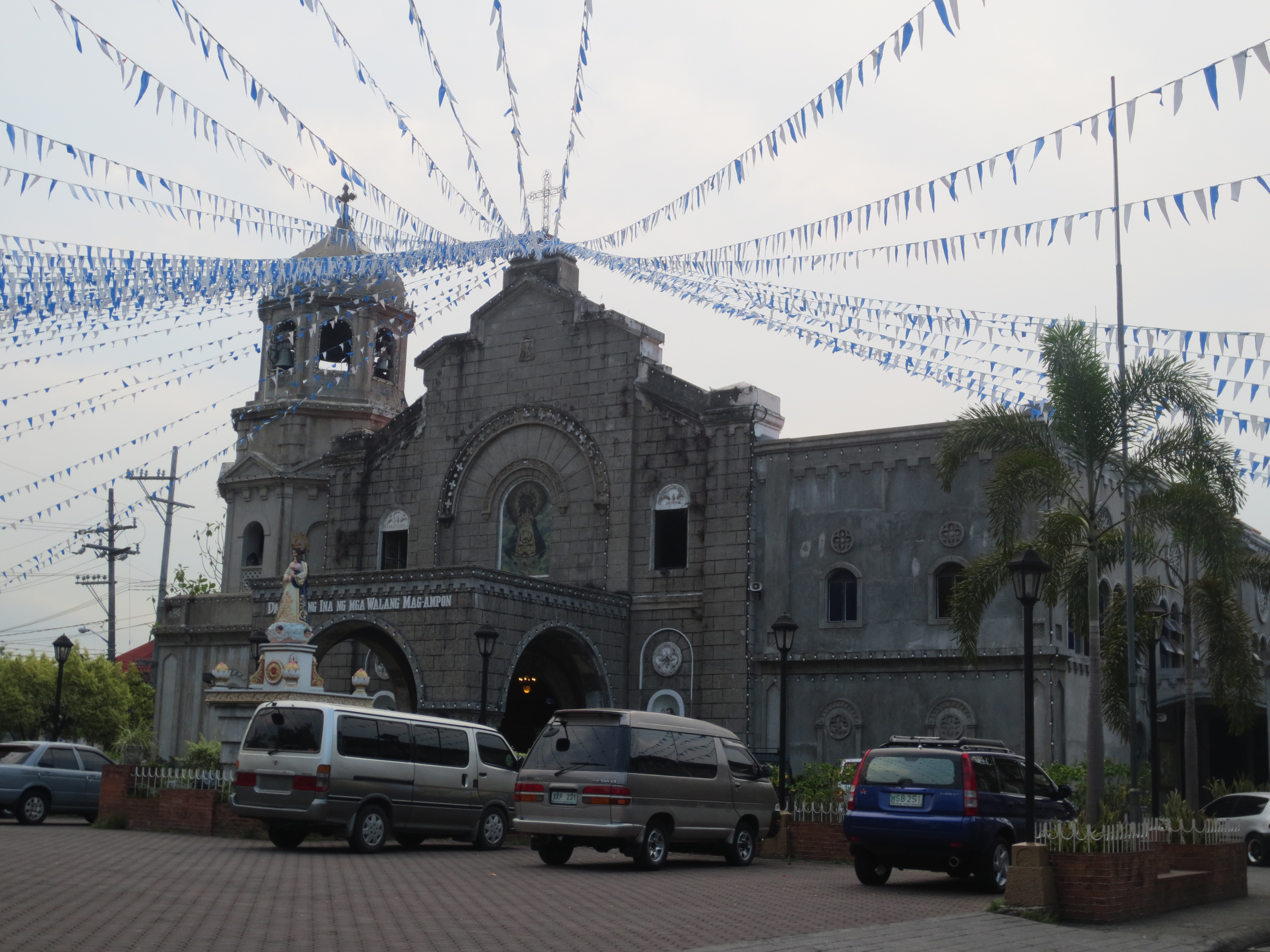
Facade of the Our Lady of Abandoned Parish Church.

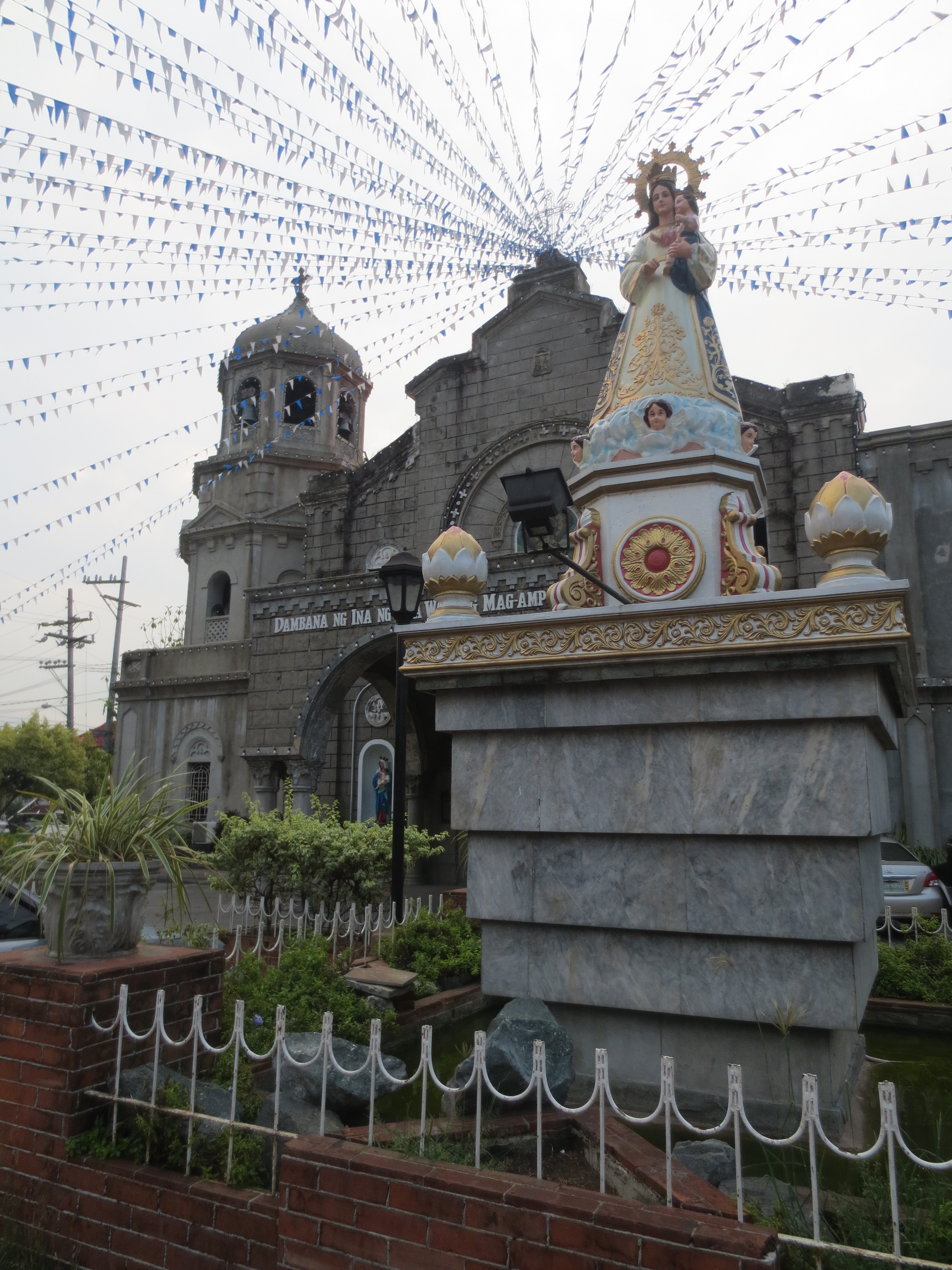
Nuestra Señora de los Desamparados in front of the OLA Church.

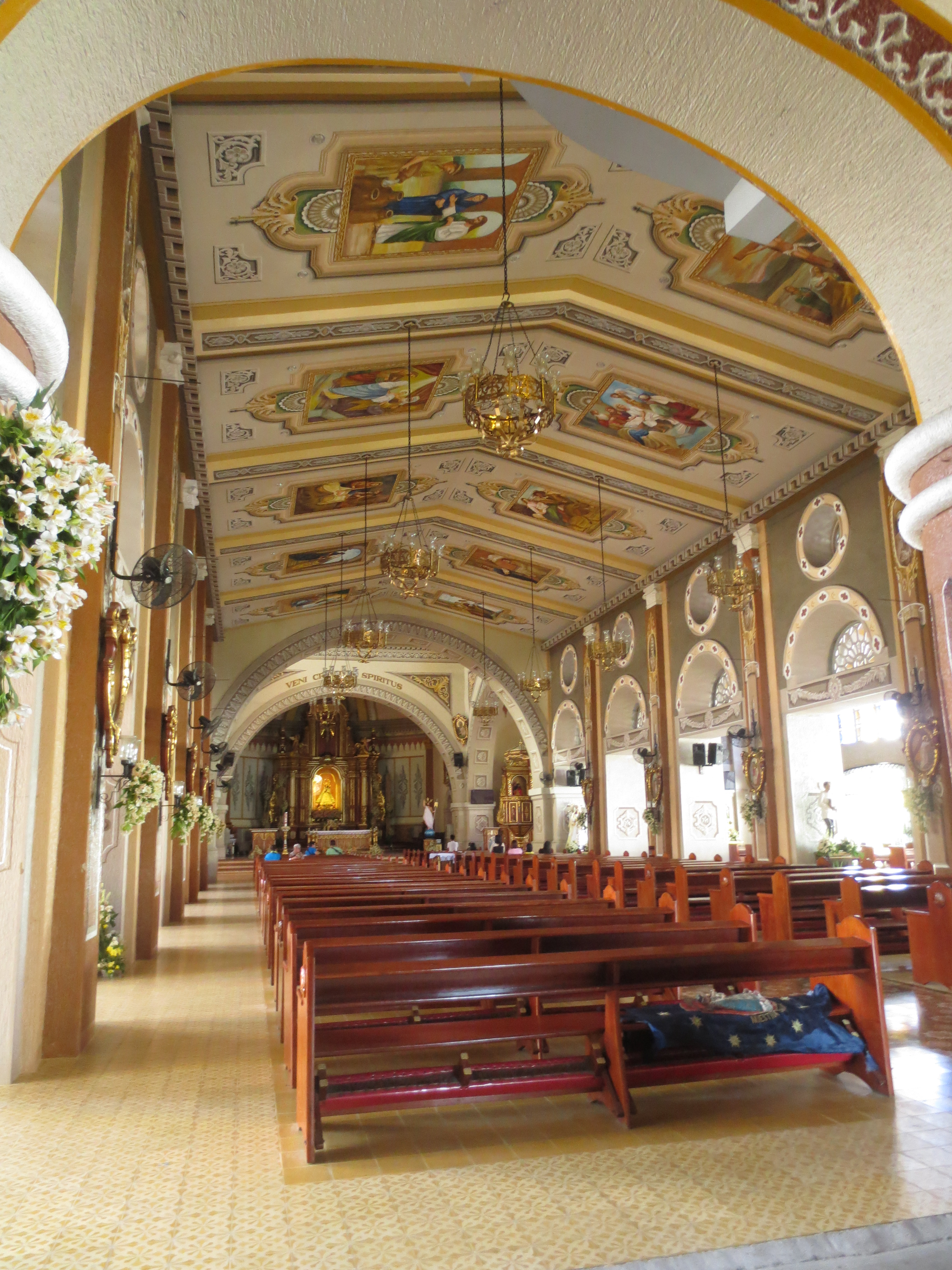
An inside look of the OLA Church.

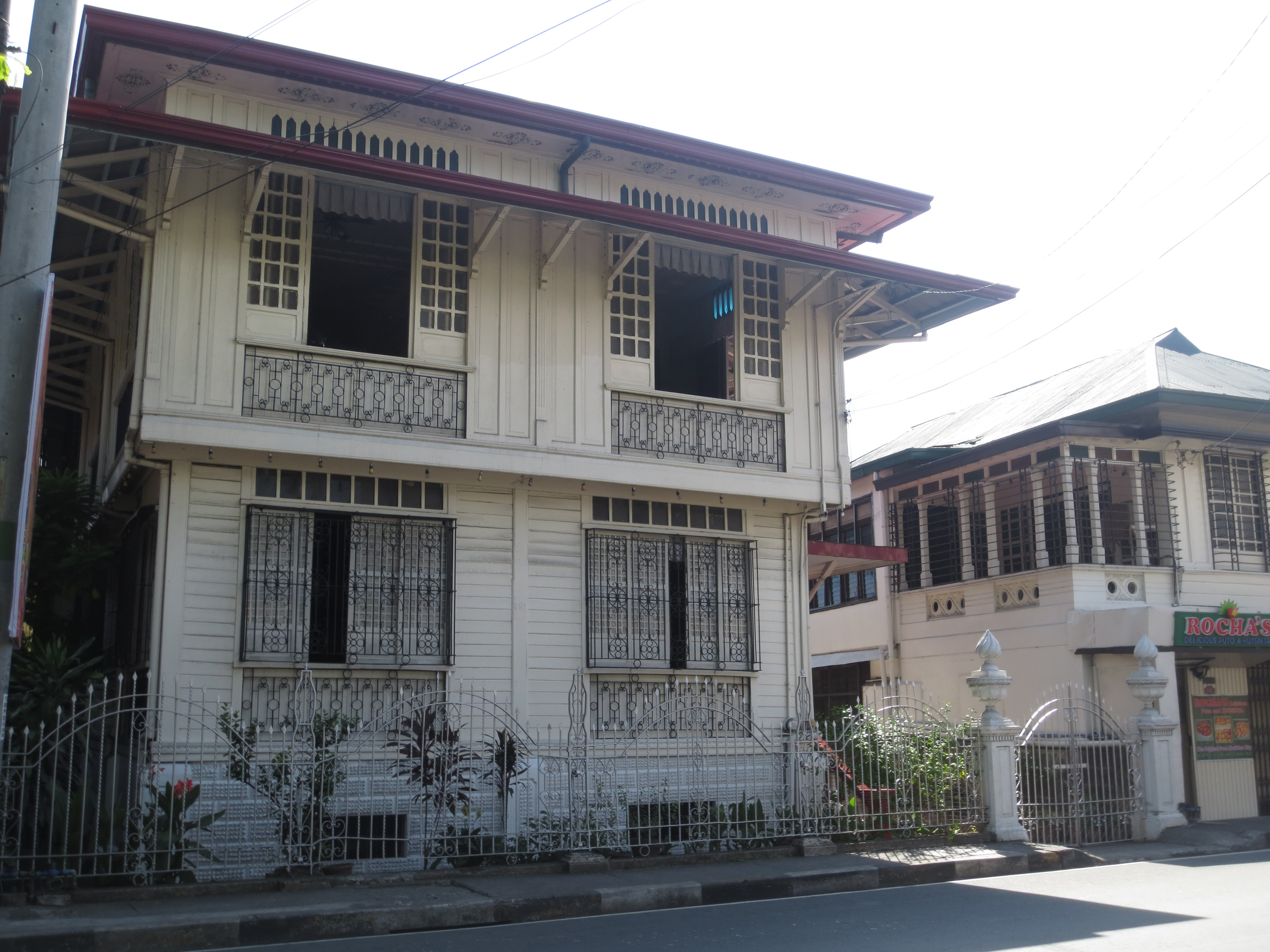
The Old Chanyungco House.

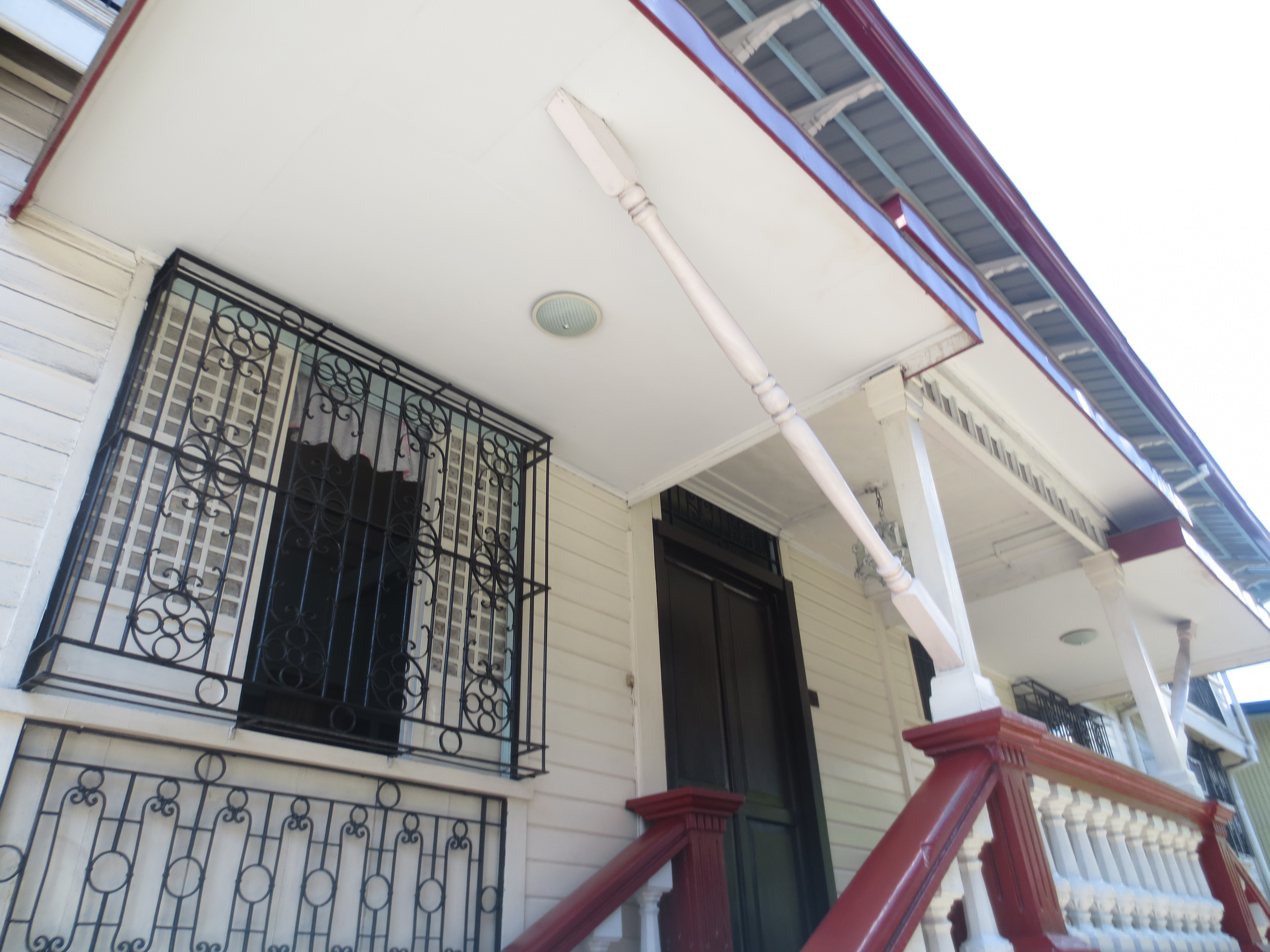
A closer look of the old Chanyungco House.

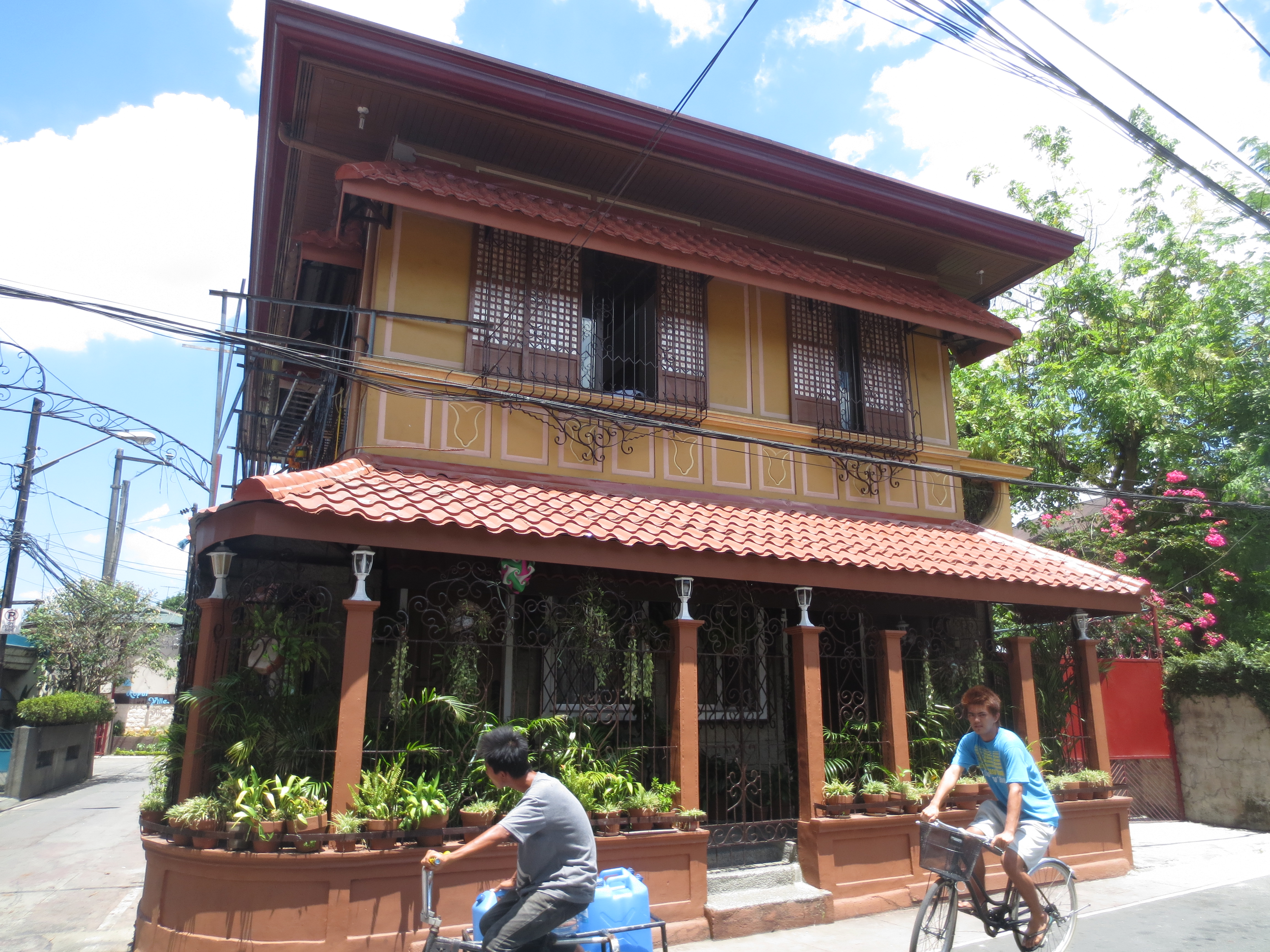
The Dela Paz house with a small patio constructed by the descendants of the dela Paz and Tuason

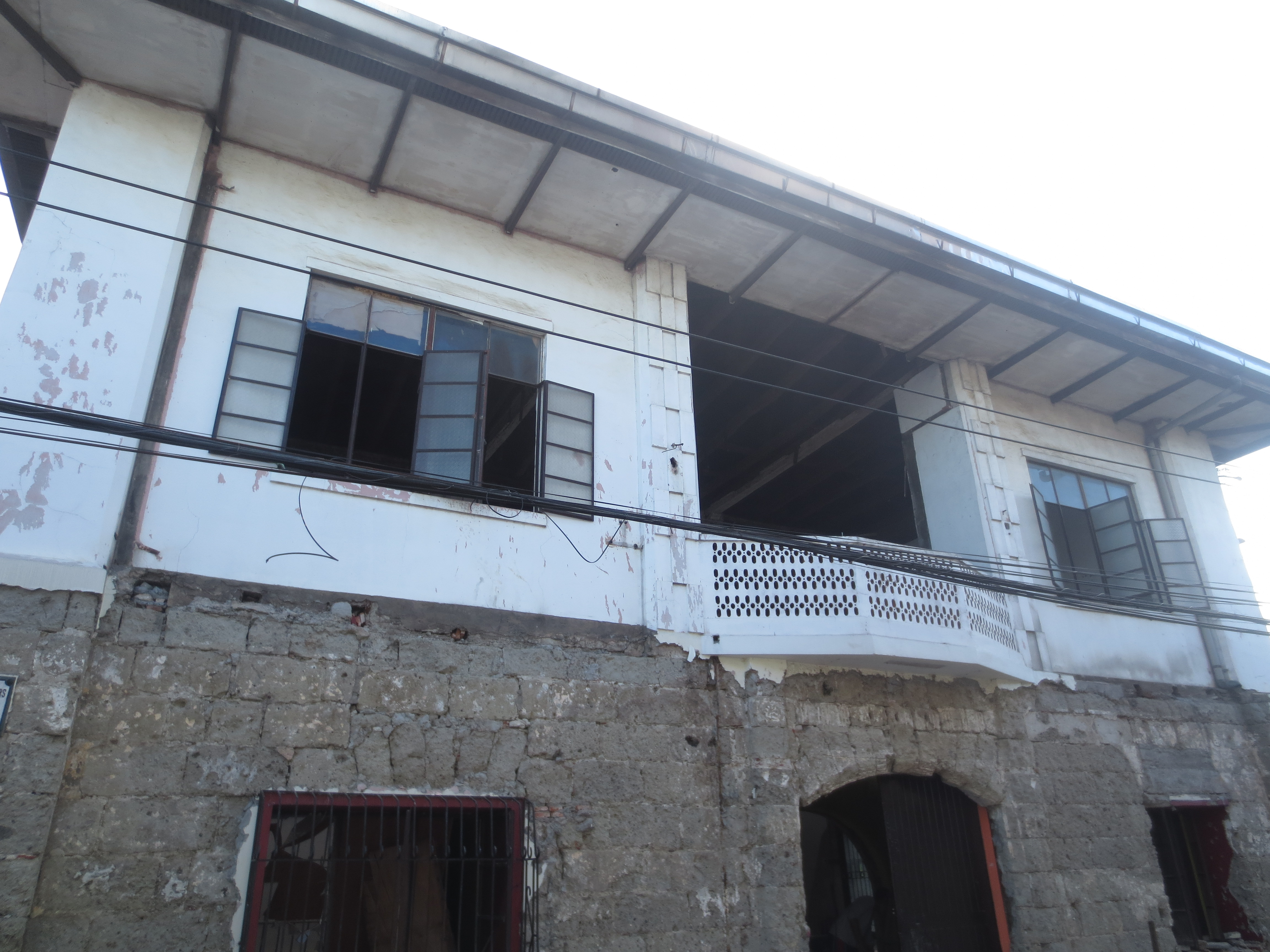
A closer look of one of Marikina's oldest houses, the Capitan Venciong house

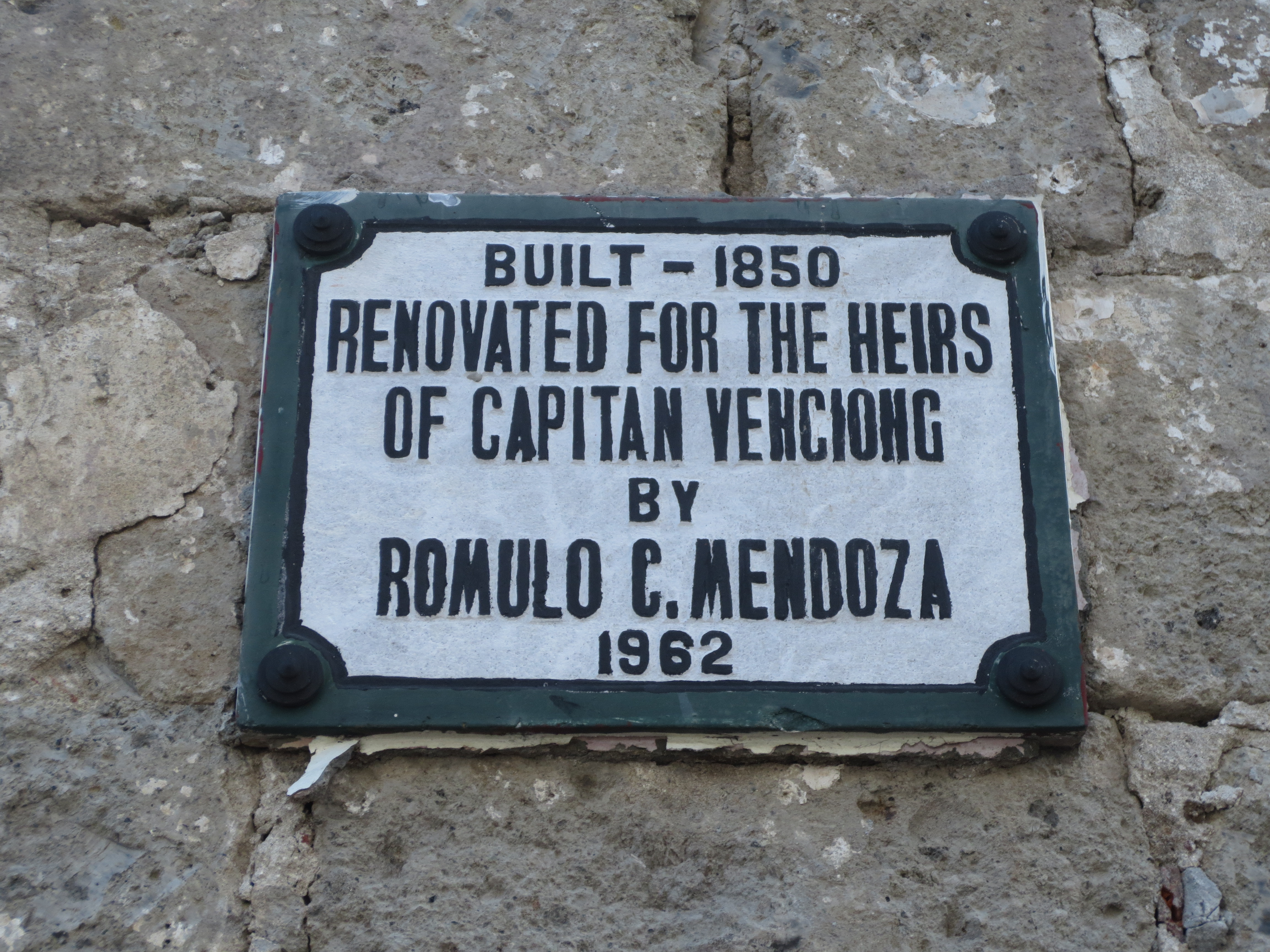
A marker beside the Capitan Venciong house stating its date of construction and renovation.

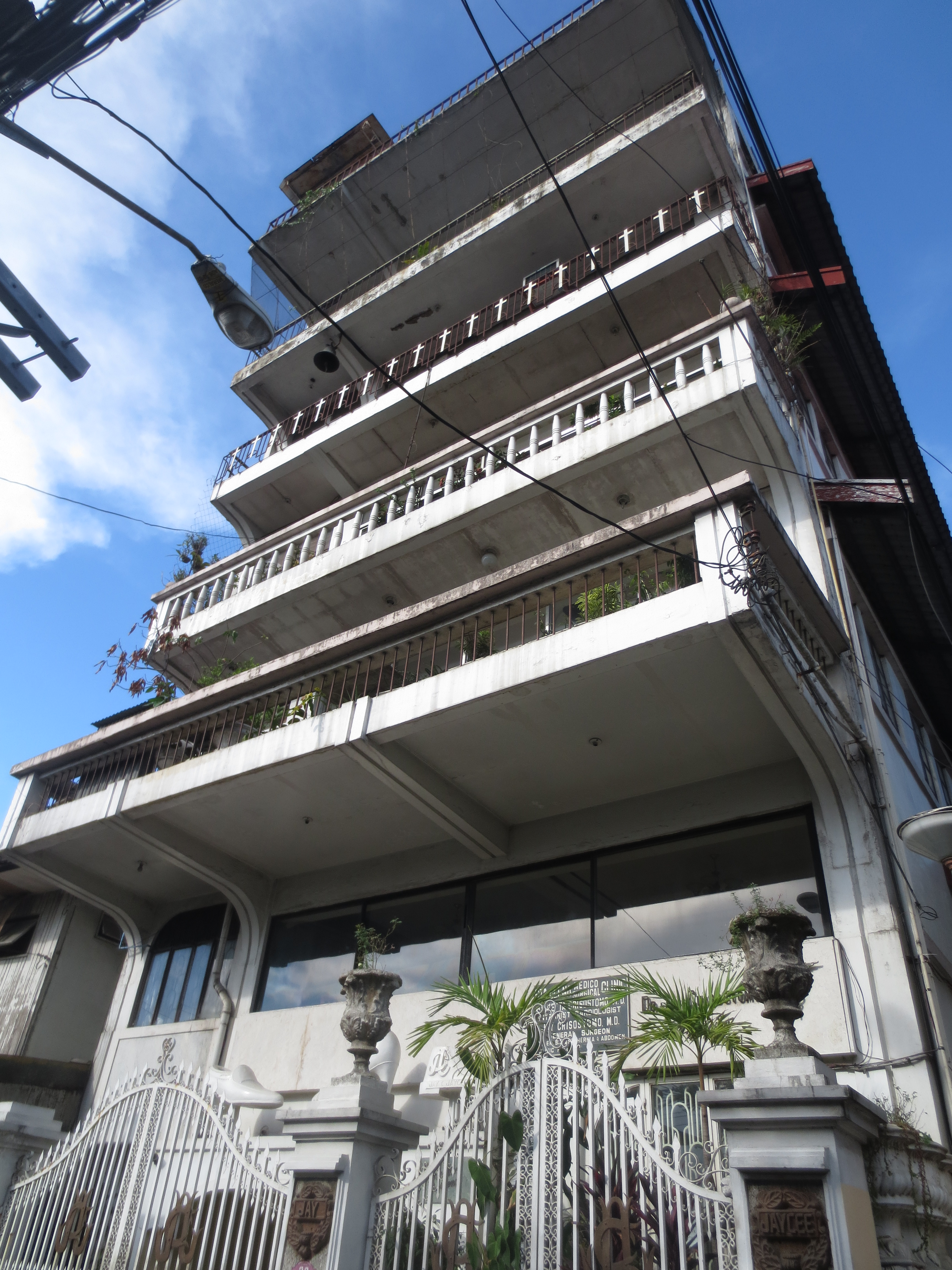
The Crisostomo building, retrofit for resistance to strong waves generated by earthquakes.

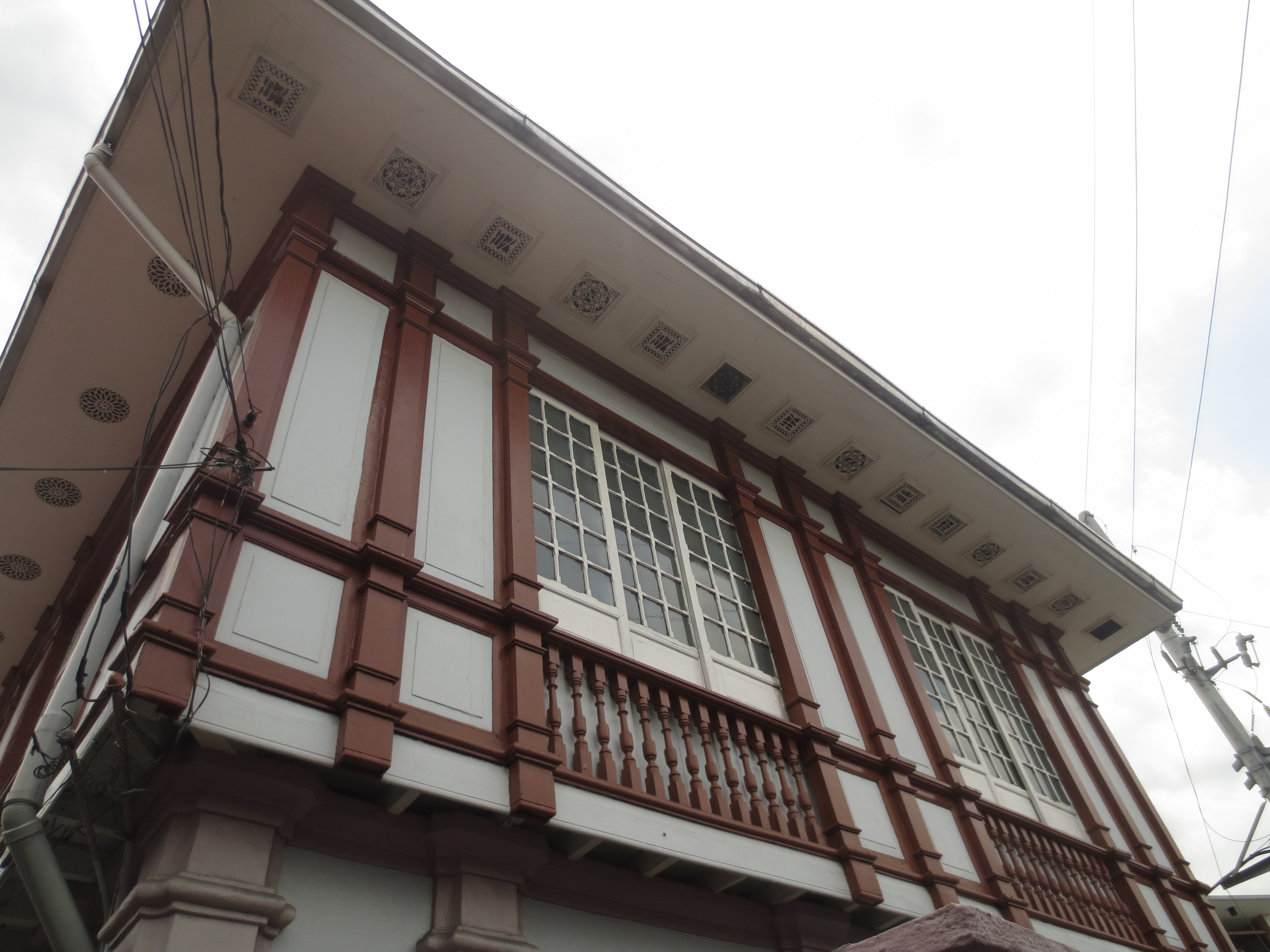
A closer view of the Santos House in Sta. Elena.

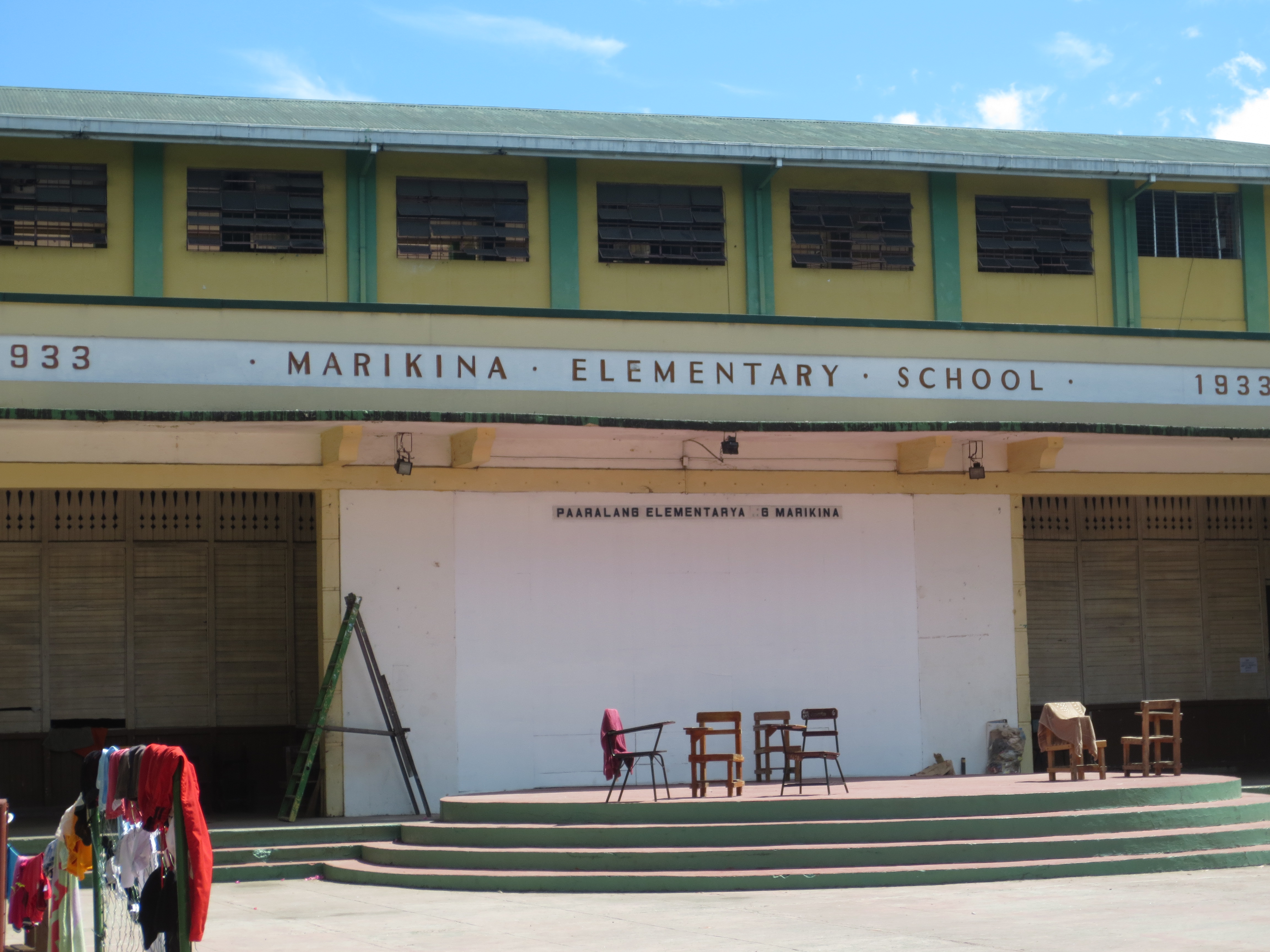
Marikina Elementary School is one of the earliest schools during the American regime which was incorporated with Gabaldon-style of architecture.

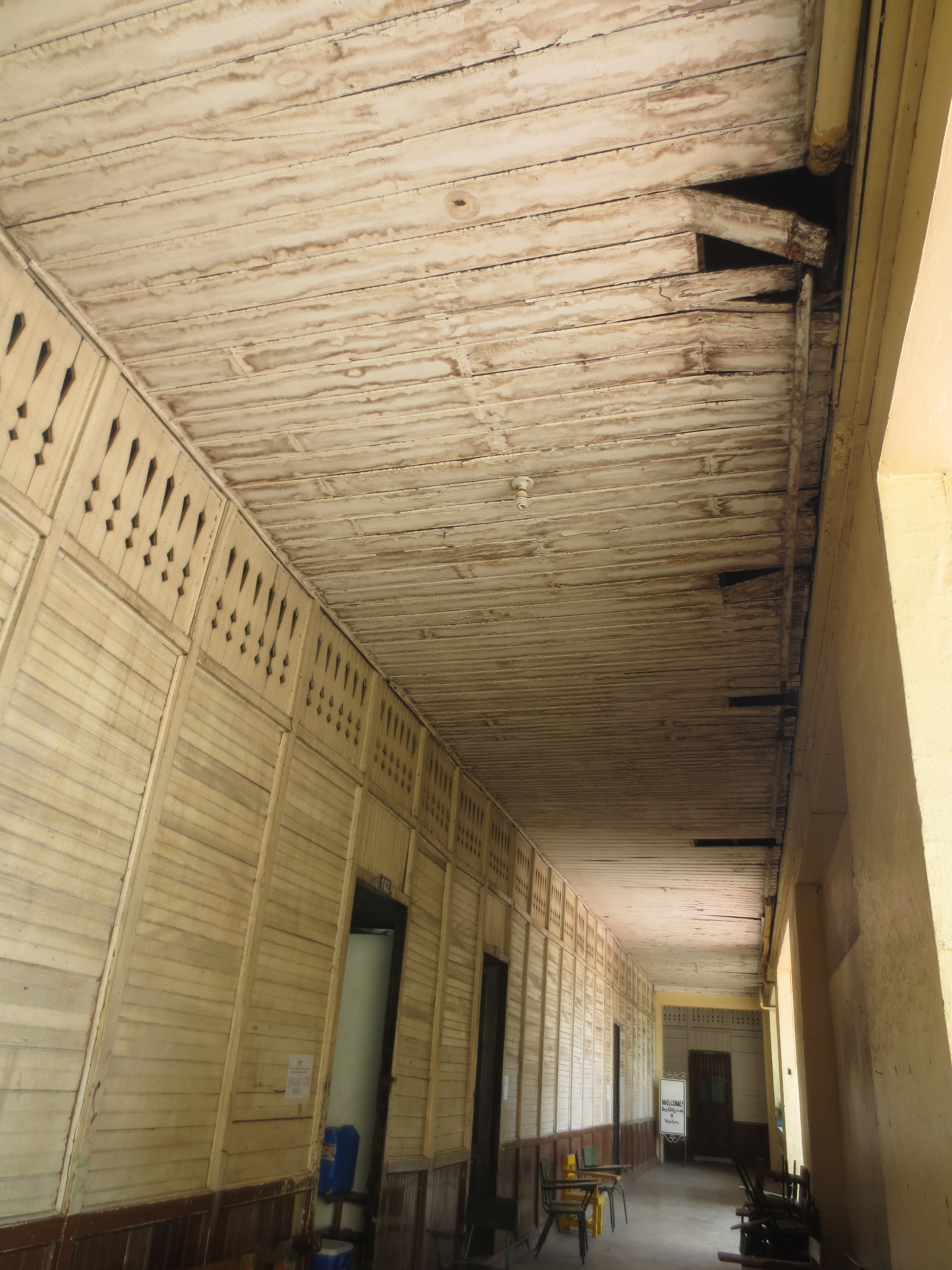
The Marikina Elementary School has managed to retain its gabaldon style of architecture built in 1933.

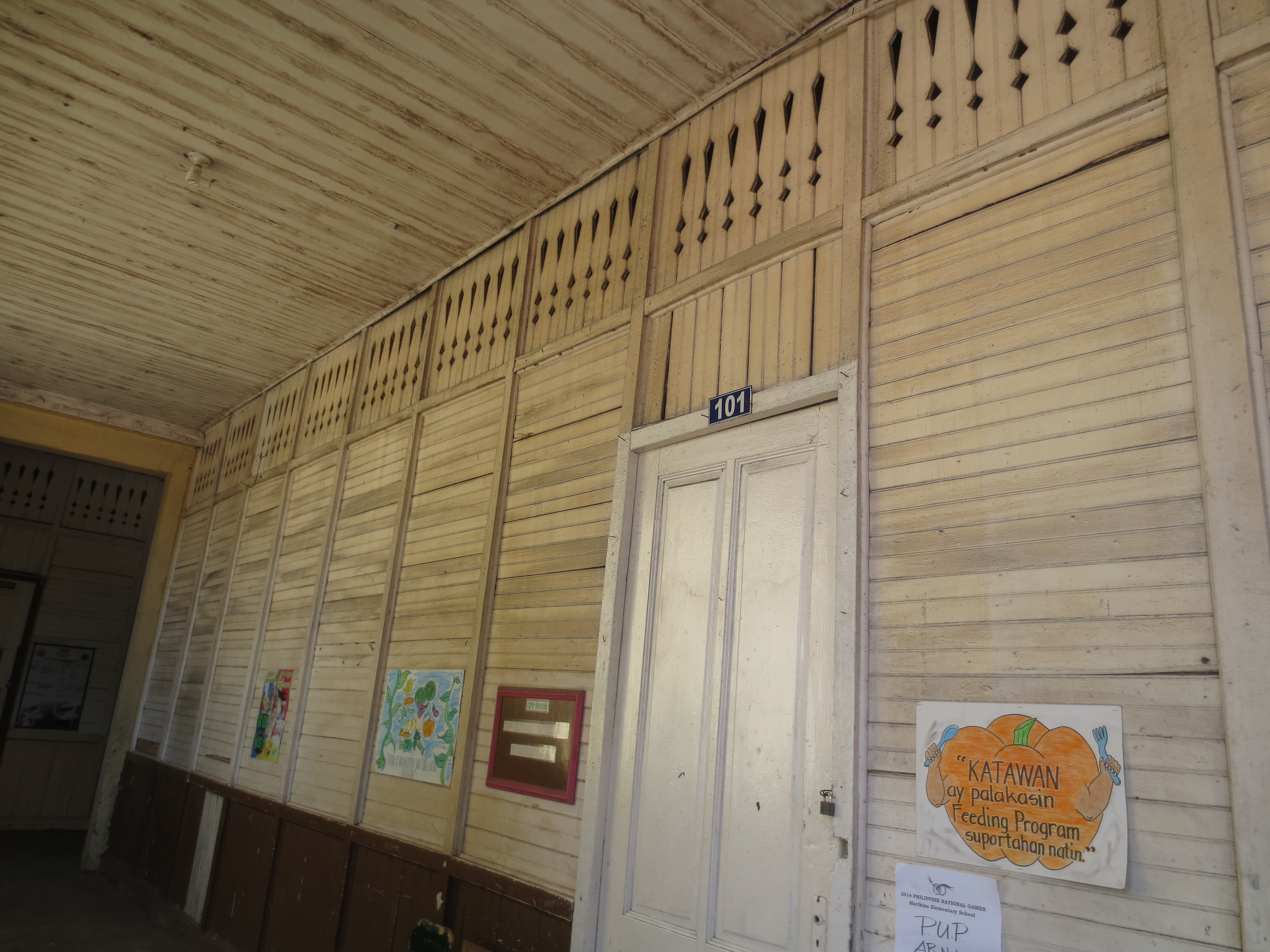
A gabaldon style of architecture is characterized with sashed windows made of latticed capiz-tagkawayan to provide the best natural ventilation.

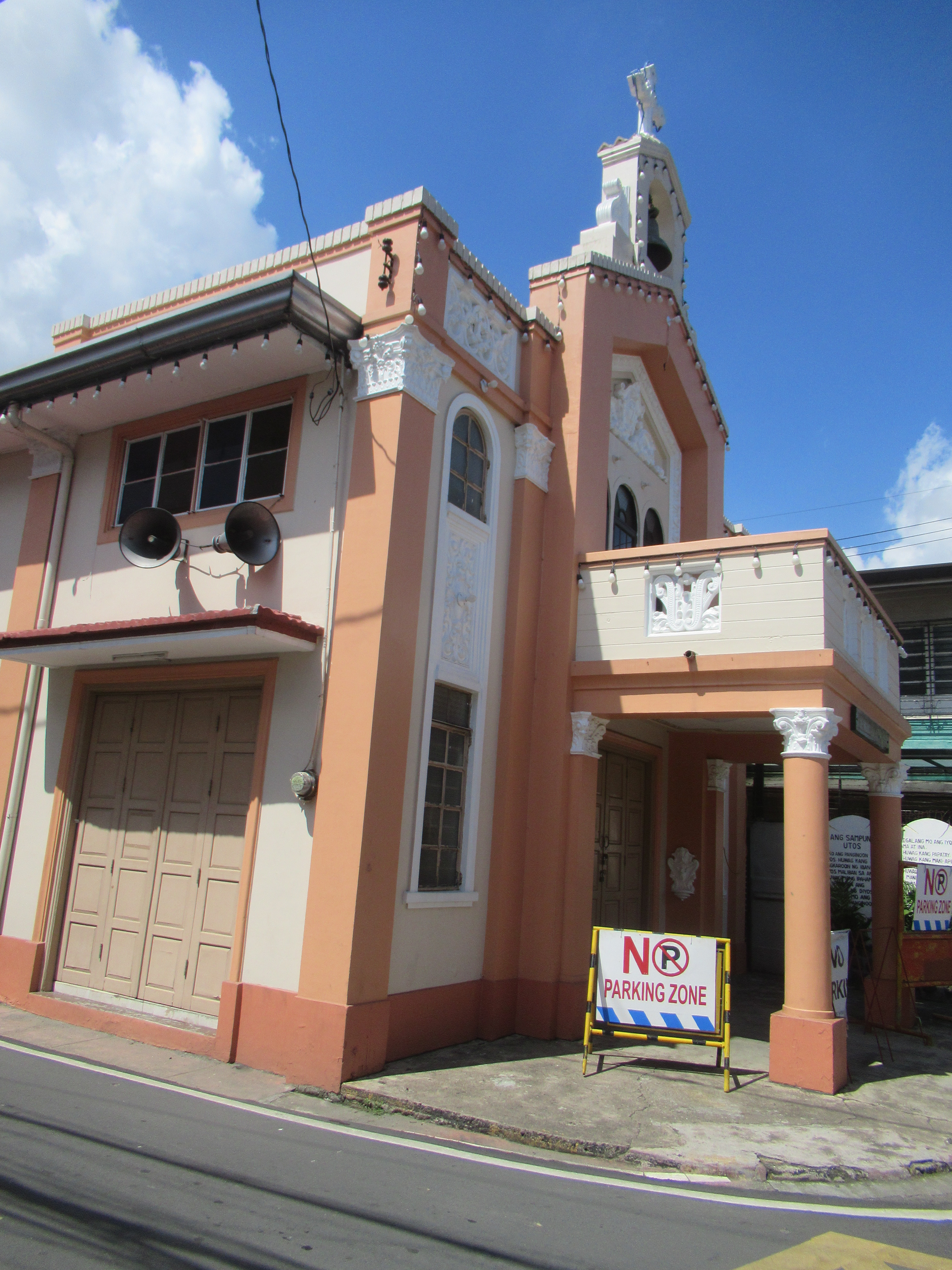
Chapel of Saint Helena

== See also ==
- Barangays of Marikina
- Diocesan Shrine and Parish of Nuestra Señora de los Desamparados
- Zamora House (Marikina)
