= 2010 Metro Manila local elections =

Local elections were held in Metro Manila on May 10, 2010, as part of the 2010 Philippine general election.

== Caloocan ==
=== Mayor ===
Incumbent Mayor Recom Echiverri of the Liberal Party won re-election to a second term.

| Candidate | Party | Votes | % |
|---|---|---|---|
| Recom Echiverri | Liberal Party | 240,144 | 62.30 |
| Luis Asistio | Nationalist People's Coalition | 141,709 | 36.76 |
| Roberto Cordero | Independent | 3,641 | 0.94 |
| Total | | 385,494 | 100.00 |
| Valid votes | | 385,494 | 93.58 |
| Invalid/blank votes | | 26,458 | 6.42 |
| Total votes | | 411,952 | 100.00 |
| Liberal Party hold | | | |
Source: ibanangayon.ph

=== Vice Mayor ===
Term-limited incumbent Vice Mayor Luis Tito Varela of the Liberal Party ran for the House of Representatives in Caloocan's 1st district. The Liberal Party nominated former representative Edgar Erice, who won the election.

| Candidate | Party | Votes | % |
|---|---|---|---|
| Edgar Erice | Liberal Party | 180,379 | 49.50 |
| Rey Malonzo | Katipunan ng Bagong Caloocan | 100,089 | 27.46 |
| Boy Asistio | Independent | 68,228 | 18.72 |
| Cherry Vallega | Kilusang Bagong Lipunan | 12,986 | 3.56 |
| Mariano Yu | Independent | 2,748 | 0.75 |
| Total | | 364,430 | 100.00 |
| Valid votes | | 364,430 | 88.46 |
| Invalid/blank votes | | 47,522 | 11.54 |
| Total votes | | 411,952 | 100.00 |
| Liberal Party gain from Nationalist People's Coalition | | | |
Source: ibanangayon.ph

=== City Council ===
The Caloocan City Council is composed of 14 councilors, 12 of whom are elected.

| Party | Votes | % | Seats |
|---|---|---|---|
| Liberal Party | 1,051,101 | 51.07 | 10 |
| Nacionalista Party | 374,565 | 18.20 | 1 |
| Lakas–Kampi–CMD | 176,187 | 8.56 | 0 |
| Nationalist People's Coalition | 138,113 | 6.71 | 0 |
| Pwersa ng Masang Pilipino | 77,389 | 3.76 | 1 |
| Ang Kapatiran | 18,681 | 0.91 | 0 |
| Kilusang Bagong Lipunan | 2,420 | 0.12 | 0 |
| Independent | 219,778 | 10.68 | 0 |
| Total | 2,058,234 | 100.00 | 12 |
| Total votes | 432,895 | – | |
Source: ibanangayon.ph

==== 1st district ====
| Candidate | Party | Votes | % |
|---|---|---|---|
| Along Malapitan | Nacionalista Party | 132,193 | 10.38 |
| Susana Punzalan | Liberal Party | 130,461 | 10.24 |
| Nora Nubla | Liberal Party | 130,284 | 10.23 |
| Dante Prado | Liberal Party | 116,892 | 9.18 |
| Ramon Te | Liberal Party | 109,139 | 8.57 |
| Andres Mabagos | Liberal Party | 79,965 | 6.28 |
| Roberto Cruz | Liberal Party | 79,676 | 6.26 |
| Henry Cammayo | Nationalist People's Coalition | 75,237 | 5.91 |
| Andrew Asistio | Nacionalista Party | 73,914 | 5.80 |
| Isaac Domingo | Nacionalista Party | 72,529 | 5.69 |
| Ireneo Cayetano | Nationalist People's Coalition | 62,876 | 4.94 |
| Juan Antonio Trillanes | Independent | 47,044 | 3.69 |
| Cenon Mayor | Lakas–Kampi–CMD | 42,031 | 3.30 |
| Crispin Peña Sr. | Nacionalista Party | 24,556 | 1.93 |
| Joseph Aquino | Independent | 18,253 | 1.43 |
| Cristina Guino-o | Independent | 16,951 | 1.33 |
| Rodolfo Gonzaga | Independent | 9,097 | 0.71 |
| Leonardo dela Cruz | Independent | 8,745 | 0.69 |
| Emmanuel Cruz | Independent | 6,910 | 0.54 |
| Oscar Benedict Vallejo | Independent | 6,308 | 0.50 |
| Jimmy Sanchez | Independent | 5,686 | 0.45 |
| Rasty Benson | Independent | 4,426 | 0.35 |
| Fernando Vinoya | Independent | 4,366 | 0.34 |
| Germel Perit | Independent | 2,670 | 0.21 |
| Amie Rabas | Independent | 2,621 | 0.21 |
| Jesus Budac Jr. | Independent | 2,614 | 0.21 |
| Virgilio Luzares | Independent | 2,547 | 0.20 |
| Garth Gollayan | Independent | 2,227 | 0.17 |
| Jamin Tulbo | Independent | 1,971 | 0.15 |
| Loney Sapdin | Independent | 1,535 | 0.12 |
| Total | | 1,273,724 | 100.00 |
| Total votes | | 270,976 | – |
Source: ibanangayon.ph

==== 2nd district ====
| Candidate | Party | Votes | % |
|---|---|---|---|
| Carolyn Cunanan | Liberal Party | 82,471 | 10.51 |
| Macario Asistio III | Pwersa ng Masang Pilipino | 77,389 | 9.86 |
| Toletino Bagus | Liberal Party | 76,359 | 9.73 |
| Luis Chito Abel | Liberal Party | 74,933 | 9.55 |
| Allen Alexander Aruelo | Liberal Party | 72,936 | 9.30 |
| Marjorie Barretto | Liberal Party | 49,911 | 6.36 |
| Arnold Divina | Liberal Party | 48,074 | 6.13 |
| Joseph Timbol | Lakas–Kampi–CMD | 37,154 | 4.74 |
| Norlando Divina | Lakas–Kampi–CMD | 34,226 | 4.36 |
| Roberto Samson | Lakas–Kampi–CMD | 33,433 | 4.26 |
| Jerrboy Mauricio | Independent | 26,690 | 3.40 |
| Marc Merville Orozco | Nacionalista Party | 20,315 | 2.59 |
| Alvin Abelardo | Ang Kapatiran | 18,681 | 2.38 |
| Ronald Romero | Lakas–Kampi–CMD | 16,668 | 2.12 |
| Nestor Samson | Nacionalista Party | 16,658 | 2.12 |
| Roehl Nadurata | Independent | 14,925 | 1.90 |
| Roseller Arcadio | Nacionalista Party | 14,594 | 1.86 |
| Jaime Mataragnon Sr. | Independent | 13,197 | 1.68 |
| Trinidad Repuno | Lakas–Kampi–CMD | 12,675 | 1.62 |
| Serafico Placer | Nacionalista Party | 11,196 | 1.43 |
| Joseph Ariestotle Mapue | Nacionalista Party | 8,610 | 1.10 |
| Jose Isagani Gonzales | Independent | 4,740 | 0.60 |
| Melvin Louie Manalaysay | Independent | 4,698 | 0.60 |
| Tito Herminio Diño | Independent | 4,520 | 0.58 |
| Robert Lee Vitug | Independent | 4,401 | 0.56 |
| Arlan Gurnot | Independent | 2,636 | 0.34 |
| Romeo Luz Jr. | Kilusang Bagong Lipunan | 2,420 | 0.31 |
| Total | | 784,510 | 100.00 |
| Total votes | | 161,919 | – |
Source: ibanangayon.ph

== Las Piñas ==
=== Mayor ===
Incumbent Mayor Vergel Aguilar of the Nacionalista Party won re-election to a second term.

| Candidate | Party | Votes | % |
|---|---|---|---|
| Vergel Aguilar | Nacionalista Party | 174,422 | 91.96 |
| Felix Sinajon | Liberal Party | 8,354 | 4.40 |
| Antonio Abellar Jr. | Independent | 5,142 | 2.71 |
| Liberato Gabano | Independent | 1,757 | 0.93 |
| Total | | 189,675 | 100.00 |
| Valid votes | | 189,675 | 89.22 |
| Invalid/blank votes | | 22,919 | 10.78 |
| Total votes | | 212,594 | 100.00 |
| Nacionalista Party hold | | | |
Source: ibanangayon.ph

=== Vice Mayor ===
Incumbent Vice Mayor Henry Medina of the Nacionalista Party ran for the Las Piñas City Council in the 2nd district. The Nacionalista Party nominated city councilor Luis Bustamante, who won the election.

| Candidate | Party | Votes | % |
|---|---|---|---|
| Luis Bustamante | Nacionalista Party | 149,931 | 83.99 |
| Benjamin Gonzales | Liberal Party | 21,614 | 12.11 |
| Estelita Salentes | Independent | 3,938 | 2.21 |
| Teodoro Baldomaro | Independent | 3,028 | 1.70 |
| Total | | 178,511 | 100.00 |
| Valid votes | | 178,511 | 83.97 |
| Invalid/blank votes | | 34,083 | 16.03 |
| Total votes | | 212,594 | 100.00 |
| Nacionalista Party hold | | | |
Source: ibanangayon.ph

=== City Council ===
The Las Piñas City Council is composed of 14 councilors, 12 of whom are elected.

| Party | Votes | % | Seats |
|---|---|---|---|
| Nacionalista Party | 662,205 | 69.59 | 12 |
| Liberal Party | 151,126 | 15.88 | 0 |
| Ang Kapatiran | 24,823 | 2.61 | 0 |
| Independent | 113,469 | 11.92 | 0 |
| Total | 951,623 | 100.00 | 12 |
| Total votes | 212,594 | – | |
Source: ibanangayon.ph

==== 1st district ====
| Candidate | Party | Votes | % |
|---|---|---|---|
| Dennis Aguilar | Nacionalista Party | 73,818 | 14.80 |
| Buenaventura Quilatan | Nacionalista Party | 55,336 | 11.10 |
| Oscar Pena | Nacionalista Party | 54,122 | 10.85 |
| Mark Anthony Santos | Nacionalista Party | 51,328 | 10.29 |
| Alfredo Miranda | Nacionalista Party | 46,755 | 9.37 |
| Rex Riguera | Nacionalista Party | 45,298 | 9.08 |
| Harry dela Cruz | Liberal Party | 27,533 | 5.52 |
| Vilma Miranda | Liberal Party | 26,642 | 5.34 |
| Raul Trinidad | Liberal Party | 22,649 | 4.54 |
| Elmer Gregorio | Liberal Party | 12,311 | 2.47 |
| Roberto Villanueva | Independent | 12,022 | 2.41 |
| Gladys delos Reyes | Independent | 10,476 | 2.10 |
| Mario Acuna | Independent | 9,453 | 1.90 |
| Adriano Mendoza | Independent | 8,670 | 1.74 |
| Giovanni Lavilla | Liberal Party | 8,063 | 1.62 |
| Winefredo Tanudra | Liberal Party | 7,985 | 1.60 |
| Ahllan Apolonio | Independent | 5,976 | 1.20 |
| Noel Fortuna | Independent | 5,055 | 1.01 |
| Marlon Secuya | Independent | 4,671 | 0.94 |
| Salve Musa | Independent | 4,606 | 0.92 |
| Larry Bugaring | Independent | 3,454 | 0.69 |
| Loie Taripe | Independent | 2,520 | 0.51 |
| Total | | 498,743 | 100.00 |
| Total votes | | 110,584 | – |
Source: ibanangayon.ph

==== 2nd district ====
| Candidate | Party | Votes | % |
|---|---|---|---|
| Carlo Aguilar | Nacionalista Party | 70,128 | 15.48 |
| Ruben Ramos | Nacionalista Party | 62,559 | 13.81 |
| Henry Medina | Nacionalista Party | 60,638 | 13.39 |
| Renato Dumlao | Nacionalista Party | 50,270 | 11.10 |
| Danilo Hernandez | Nacionalista Party | 50,231 | 11.09 |
| Leopoldo Benedicto | Nacionalista Party | 41,722 | 9.21 |
| Emmanuel Luis Casimiro | Ang Kapatiran | 24,823 | 5.48 |
| Danilo Lopez | Liberal Party | 15,219 | 3.36 |
| Perfecto Fernanadez Jr. | Independent | 13,254 | 2.93 |
| Modesto Domingo | Liberal Party | 11,816 | 2.61 |
| Ronald Dominguez | Liberal Party | 10,453 | 2.31 |
| Lannie Aranas | Independent | 8,643 | 1.91 |
| Mario Casabal | Liberal Party | 8,455 | 1.87 |
| Nerissa Murillo | Independent | 7,772 | 1.72 |
| Danilo Paez | Independent | 7,688 | 1.70 |
| Elsa Alcover | Independent | 5,555 | 1.23 |
| Nonita Menil | Independent | 3,654 | 0.81 |
| Total | | 452,880 | 100.00 |
| Total votes | | 102,010 | – |
Source: ibanangayon.ph

== Makati ==
=== Mayor ===
Term-limited incumbent Mayor Jejomar Binay of PDP–Laban ran for Vice President of the Philippines. PDP–Laban nominated Binay's son, city councilor Jejomar Binay Jr., who won the election.

| Candidate | Party | Votes | % |
|---|---|---|---|
| Jejomar Binay Jr. | PDP–Laban | 125,664 | 46.02 |
| Ernesto Mercado | Nacionalista Party | 80,151 | 29.35 |
| Erwin Genuino | Bigkis Pinoy | 61,203 | 22.41 |
| Butz Aquino | Independent | 5,816 | 2.13 |
| Edmundo Tagalog | Independent | 253 | 0.09 |
| Total | | 273,087 | 100.00 |
| Valid votes | | 273,087 | 96.67 |
| Invalid/blank votes | | 9,402 | 3.33 |
| Total votes | | 282,489 | 100.00 |
| PDP–Laban hold | | | |
Source: Commission on Elections

=== Vice Mayor ===
Term-limited incumbent Vice Mayor Ernesto Mercado of the Nacionalista Party ran for Mayor of Makati. Mercado endorsed Makati Liga ng mga Barangay president Kid Peña, who won the election as an independent.

| Candidate | Party | Votes | % |
|---|---|---|---|
| Kid Peña | Independent | 105,949 | 40.76 |
| Rico J. Puno | PDP–Laban | 93,429 | 35.94 |
| Jobelle Salvador | Bigkis Pinoy | 35,469 | 13.64 |
| Miguel Yabut Jr. | Independent | 23,600 | 9.08 |
| Manuel Ballelos Jr. | Independent | 1,507 | 0.58 |
| Total | | 259,954 | 100.00 |
| Valid votes | | 259,954 | 92.02 |
| Invalid/blank votes | | 22,535 | 7.98 |
| Total votes | | 282,489 | 100.00 |
| Independent gain from Nacionalista Party | | | |
Source: Commission on Elections

=== City Council ===
The Makati City Council is composed of 18 councilors, 16 of whom are elected.

| Party | Votes | % | Seats |
|---|---|---|---|
| Nacionalista Party | 618,490 | 33.79 | 9 |
| PDP–Laban | 393,279 | 21.49 | 4 |
| Bigkis Pinoy | 294,468 | 16.09 | 0 |
| Nationalist People's Coalition | 63,727 | 3.48 | 1 |
| Philippine Green Republican Party | 5,276 | 0.29 | 0 |
| Independent | 455,089 | 24.86 | 2 |
| Total | 1,830,329 | 100.00 | 16 |
| Total votes | 282,489 | – | |
Source: Commission on Elections

==== 1st district ====
| Candidate | Party | Votes | % |
|---|---|---|---|
| Ferdinand Eusebio | PDP–Laban | 59,228 | 6.90 |
| Maria Concepcion Yabut | Nacionalista Party | 57,879 | 6.74 |
| Tosca Puno-Ramos | PDP–Laban | 52,794 | 6.15 |
| Virgilio Hilario Sr. | Nacionalista Party | 50,815 | 5.92 |
| Marie Casal-Uy | PDP–Laban | 48,903 | 5.69 |
| Monsour del Rosario | Nacionalista Party | 48,753 | 5.68 |
| Arnold Magpantay | Independent | 47,401 | 5.52 |
| Romeo Medina | Independent | 44,537 | 5.19 |
| Ferdinand Estrella | Independent | 43,792 | 5.10 |
| Luis Javier Sr. | Independent | 42,976 | 5.00 |
| Armando Padilla | PDP–Laban | 42,353 | 4.93 |
| Ma. Arlene Ortega | Independent | 40,874 | 4.76 |
| Glenn Enciso | Nacionalista Party | 29,534 | 3.44 |
| Renato Bondal | Nacionalista Party | 29,495 | 3.43 |
| Severino Umandap | Nacionalista Party | 28,330 | 3.30 |
| Eduardo Ison | Nacionalista Party | 27,951 | 3.25 |
| Jessielin Trinidad | Bigkis Pinoy | 20,907 | 2.43 |
| Virgilio Batalla | Bigkis Pinoy | 19,096 | 2.22 |
| Wilfredo Talag | Bigkis Pinoy | 17,983 | 2.09 |
| Peter John Gonzalez | Bigkis Pinoy | 15,661 | 1.82 |
| Pedro Dadula | Bigkis Pinoy | 14,025 | 1.63 |
| Rodelio dela Cruz | Bigkis Pinoy | 12,797 | 1.49 |
| Michael Dennis Reyes | Bigkis Pinoy | 11,601 | 1.35 |
| Arnold Valenzuela | Bigkis Pinoy | 11,071 | 1.29 |
| Racquel Manalili | Independent | 8,885 | 1.03 |
| Perfecto Santos | Independent | 6,836 | 0.80 |
| Otelio Jochico | Independent | 6,809 | 0.79 |
| Feliciano Bascon | Independent | 5,504 | 0.64 |
| Erlinda Lima | Philippine Green Republican Party | 5,276 | 0.61 |
| Edwin Lester Quiboloy | Independent | 4,258 | 0.50 |
| Remigio Jerusalem Jr. | Independent | 2,515 | 0.29 |
| Total | | 858,839 | 100.00 |
| Total votes | | 136,177 | – |
Source: Commission on Elections

==== 2nd district ====
| Candidate | Party | Votes | % |
|---|---|---|---|
| Vincent Sese | Nacionalista Party | 67,179 | 6.92 |
| Nemesio Yabut Jr. | Nationalist People's Coalition | 63,727 | 6.56 |
| Nelson Pasia | PDP–Laban | 59,358 | 6.11 |
| Salvador Pangilinan | Nacionalista Party | 57,077 | 5.88 |
| Leonardo Magpantay | Nacionalista Party | 55,914 | 5.76 |
| Maria Theresa de Lara | Nacionalista Party | 55,506 | 5.71 |
| Mary Ruth Tolentino | Nacionalista Party | 55,198 | 5.68 |
| Henry Jacome | Nacionalista Party | 54,859 | 5.65 |
| Joel Ibay | Independent | 53,934 | 5.55 |
| Angelito Gatchalian | PDP–Laban | 53,092 | 5.47 |
| Evelyn Villamor | PDP–Laban | 40,186 | 4.14 |
| Elena Maccay | Bigkis Pinoy | 38,027 | 3.91 |
| Jeline Olfato | PDP–Laban | 37,365 | 3.85 |
| Juanito dela Cruz | Independent | 34,872 | 3.59 |
| Benedict Baniqued | Bigkis Pinoy | 30,455 | 3.13 |
| Wenefreda Urena | Independent | 30,071 | 3.10 |
| Richard Raymund Rodriguez | Independent | 29,714 | 3.06 |
| Catalina Balaoing | Bigkis Pinoy | 21,836 | 2.25 |
| Ceferino Peralta Jr. | Bigkis Pinoy | 18,768 | 1.93 |
| Virgilio Calimbahin Jr. | Bigkis Pinoy | 17,217 | 1.77 |
| Armando Tercero | Bigkis Pinoy | 16,656 | 1.71 |
| Abner Dreu | Bigkis Pinoy | 14,941 | 1.54 |
| Antonio Manalili | Independent | 14,875 | 1.53 |
| Gaspar Mapagdalita | Bigkis Pinoy | 13,427 | 1.38 |
| Alberto Almario | Independent | 8,743 | 0.90 |
| Rodolfo Biolena | Independent | 8,233 | 0.85 |
| Carlito Buenaventura | Independent | 6,103 | 0.63 |
| Alfredo Lapasaran | Independent | 5,961 | 0.61 |
| Nilo Miranda | Independent | 4,886 | 0.50 |
| Nemesio Beare | Independent | 3,310 | 0.34 |
| Total | | 971,490 | 100.00 |
| Total votes | | 146,312 | – |
Source: Commission on Elections

== Malabon ==
=== Mayor ===
Incumbent Mayor Tito Oreta of Lakas–Kampi–CMD won re-election to a third term unopposed.

| Candidate | Party | Votes | % |
|---|---|---|---|
| Tito Oreta | Lakas–Kampi–CMD | 104,245 | 100.00 |
| Total | | 104,245 | 100.00 |
| Valid votes | | 104,245 | 75.10 |
| Invalid/blank votes | | 34,560 | 24.90 |
| Total votes | | 138,805 | 100.00 |
| Lakas–Kampi–CMD hold | | | |
Source: Commission on Elections

=== Vice Mayor ===
Incumbent Vice Mayor Arnold Vicencio of Pwersa ng Masang Pilipino ran for the House of Representatives in Malabon's lone district. City councilor Antolin Oreta III of the Liberal Party won the election.

| Candidate | Party | Votes | % |
|---|---|---|---|
| Antolin Oreta III | Liberal Party | 80,834 | 65.57 |
| Ma. Lourdes Yambao | Lakas–Kampi–CMD | 36,471 | 29.59 |
| Pablo Cabrera | Independent | 5,389 | 4.37 |
| Salvador Beo Sr. | Independent | 581 | 0.47 |
| Total | | 123,275 | 100.00 |
| Valid votes | | 123,275 | 88.81 |
| Invalid/blank votes | | 15,530 | 11.19 |
| Total votes | | 138,805 | 100.00 |
| Liberal Party gain from Nationalist People's Coalition | | | |
Source: Commission on Elections

=== City Council ===
The Malabon City Council is composed of 14 councilors, 12 of whom are elected.

| Party | Votes | % | Seats |
|---|---|---|---|
| Lakas–Kampi–CMD | 172,514 | 26.91 | 4 |
| Liberal Party | 167,371 | 26.11 | 3 |
| Nationalist People's Coalition | 152,046 | 23.72 | 3 |
| Nacionalista Party | 110,635 | 17.26 | 2 |
| Independent | 38,564 | 6.02 | 0 |
| Total | 641,130 | 100.00 | 12 |
| Total votes | 138,805 | – | |
Source: Commission on Elections

==== 1st district ====
| Candidate | Party | Votes | % |
|---|---|---|---|
| Maricar Torres | Liberal Party | 38,179 | 11.50 |
| Ian Emmanuel Borja | Nacionalista Party | 36,649 | 11.04 |
| Jaime Dumalaog | Liberal Party | 30,480 | 9.18 |
| Payapa Ona | Lakas–Kampi–CMD | 29,975 | 9.03 |
| Ma Anna Lizza Yambao | Lakas–Kampi–CMD | 27,984 | 8.43 |
| Edwin Gregorio Dimagiba | Nationalist People's Coalition | 27,808 | 8.37 |
| Oliver Ramos | Lakas–Kampi–CMD | 26,019 | 7.83 |
| Bernard dela Cruz | Liberal Party | 25,533 | 7.69 |
| Enrique Linchangco | Liberal Party | 18,245 | 5.49 |
| Orlando Pedro | Nacionalista Party | 18,223 | 5.49 |
| Armando Balatbat | Nationalist People's Coalition | 18,091 | 5.45 |
| Merlyn Balite | Independent | 8,929 | 2.69 |
| Antonio Ponce | Liberal Party | 8,233 | 2.48 |
| Emiliano Roque Jr. | Lakas–Kampi–CMD | 7,580 | 2.28 |
| Alberto dela Cruz | Independent | 5,689 | 1.71 |
| Juanito Buhalog | Lakas–Kampi–CMD | 3,356 | 1.01 |
| Fernando Diones | Independent | 1,130 | 0.34 |
| Total | | 332,103 | 100.00 |
| Total votes | | 72,218 | – |
Source: Commission on Elections

==== 2nd district ====
| Candidate | Party | Votes | % |
|---|---|---|---|
| Diosdado Cunanan | Nationalist People's Coalition | 42,717 | 13.82 |
| Eduardo Nolasco | Nacionalista Party | 39,760 | 12.87 |
| Edward Pert dela Cruz | Liberal Party | 34,521 | 11.17 |
| Fortunato Espiritu | Lakas–Kampi–CMD | 29,840 | 9.66 |
| Edralin Yanga | Nationalist People's Coalition | 28,923 | 9.36 |
| Rufino Bautista | Lakas–Kampi–CMD | 28,338 | 9.17 |
| Merlin Mañalac | Nationalist People's Coalition | 24,878 | 8.05 |
| Sofronia Lim | Independent | 18,999 | 6.15 |
| Ildefonso Mariquit Jr. | Nacionalista Party | 16,003 | 5.18 |
| Victorio Trinidad | Liberal Party | 12,180 | 3.94 |
| Marcelo Borja Jr. | Lakas–Kampi–CMD | 10,507 | 3.40 |
| Edgardo Marcial | Nationalist People's Coalition | 9,629 | 3.12 |
| Loreto Simon | Lakas–Kampi–CMD | 8,915 | 2.88 |
| Hilda Bulaclac | Independent | 1,523 | 0.49 |
| Andres Encina | Independent | 1,247 | 0.40 |
| Gil Magdaraog Sr. | Independent | 1,047 | 0.34 |
| Total | | 309,027 | 100.00 |
| Total votes | | 66,587 | – |
Source: Commission on Elections

== Mandaluyong ==
=== Mayor ===
Incumbent Mayor Benhur Abalos of Lakas–Kampi–CMD won re-election to a second term.

| Candidate | Party | Votes | % |
|---|---|---|---|
| Benhur Abalos | Lakas–Kampi–CMD | 102,705 | 79.76 |
| Ernest Albert Buan | Aksyon Demokratiko | 24,271 | 18.85 |
| Nelma Bondoc | Independent | 1,261 | 0.98 |
| Reynaldo Viloria | Independent | 534 | 0.41 |
| Total | | 128,771 | 100.00 |
| Valid votes | | 128,771 | 94.38 |
| Invalid/blank votes | | 7,674 | 5.62 |
| Total votes | | 136,445 | 100.00 |
| Lakas–Kampi–CMD hold | | | |
Source: Commission on Elections

=== Vice Mayor ===
Incumbent Vice Mayor Renato Santa Maria of Lakas–Kampi–CMD ran for re-election to a second term, but was defeated by former city councilor Danilo de Guzman of Aksyon Demokratiko.

| Candidate | Party | Votes | % |
|---|---|---|---|
| Danilo de Guzman | Aksyon Demokratiko | 63,756 | 51.70 |
| Renato Santa Maria | Lakas–Kampi–CMD | 57,438 | 46.58 |
| Alexander Soriano | Independent | 2,121 | 1.72 |
| Total | | 123,315 | 100.00 |
| Valid votes | | 123,315 | 90.38 |
| Invalid/blank votes | | 13,130 | 9.62 |
| Total votes | | 136,445 | 100.00 |
| Aksyon Demokratiko gain from Lakas–Kampi–CMD | | | |
Source: Commission on Elections

=== City Council ===
The Mandaluyong City Council is composed of 14 councilors, 12 of whom are elected.

| Party | Votes | % | Seats |
|---|---|---|---|
| Lakas–Kampi–CMD | 396,422 | 61.07 | 10 |
| Aksyon Demokratiko | 113,880 | 17.54 | 1 |
| Independent | 138,799 | 21.38 | 1 |
| Total | 649,101 | 100.00 | 12 |
| Total votes | 136,445 | – | |
Source: Commission on Elections

==== 1st district ====
| Candidate | Party | Votes | % |
|---|---|---|---|
| Jonathan Abalos | Lakas–Kampi–CMD | 47,410 | 12.63 |
| Antonio Suva | Lakas–Kampi–CMD | 47,143 | 12.56 |
| Ayla Alim | Aksyon Demokratiko | 41,718 | 11.12 |
| Luisito Espinosa | Lakas–Kampi–CMD | 36,150 | 9.63 |
| Severo Servillon | Lakas–Kampi–CMD | 33,739 | 8.99 |
| Alex Santos | Lakas–Kampi–CMD | 32,584 | 8.68 |
| Luisito Pillas | Lakas–Kampi–CMD | 26,898 | 7.17 |
| Gerardo Pe | Independent | 19,197 | 5.12 |
| Edward Santos | Aksyon Demokratiko | 17,331 | 4.62 |
| Eduardo Pañoso | Aksyon Demokratiko | 15,604 | 4.16 |
| Arsenio Abalos | Independent | 14,567 | 3.88 |
| Domingo Santa Maria | Independent | 9,931 | 2.65 |
| Benito Francisco III | Aksyon Demokratiko | 7,171 | 1.91 |
| Filadelfo Inocentes III | Aksyon Demokratiko | 6,688 | 1.78 |
| Jose Reyes | Independent | 5,029 | 1.34 |
| Vicente Española | Independent | 3,915 | 1.04 |
| Jonas Fernandez | Independent | 3,419 | 0.91 |
| Aniceto Manansala | Independent | 2,338 | 0.62 |
| Bernardo Buela | Independent | 1,681 | 0.45 |
| Edgar Bais | Independent | 1,616 | 0.43 |
| Chito Dumas | Independent | 1,169 | 0.31 |
| Total | | 375,298 | 100.00 |
| Total votes | | 78,207 | – |
Source: Commission on Elections

==== 2nd district ====
| Candidate | Party | Votes | % |
|---|---|---|---|
| Edward Bartolome | Lakas–Kampi–CMD | 37,048 | 13.53 |
| Michael Ocampo | Lakas–Kampi–CMD | 33,537 | 12.25 |
| Jessie Garcia | Independent | 30,417 | 11.11 |
| Noel Bernardo | Lakas–Kampi–CMD | 27,921 | 10.20 |
| Alexander Santa Maria | Lakas–Kampi–CMD | 27,857 | 10.17 |
| Francisco Esteban | Lakas–Kampi–CMD | 27,230 | 9.95 |
| Romeo Cruz | Independent | 18,905 | 6.90 |
| Darius Apacionado | Lakas–Kampi–CMD | 18,905 | 6.90 |
| Julio de Quinto | Independent | 15,184 | 5.55 |
| Eugenio Rebulado | Aksyon Demokratiko | 7,436 | 2.72 |
| Renato Mallillin | Aksyon Demokratiko | 6,229 | 2.27 |
| Eduardo Geronimo Jr. | Aksyon Demokratiko | 5,888 | 2.15 |
| Davidson Santos | Aksyon Demokratiko | 4,546 | 1.66 |
| Rolito Cruz | Independent | 2,758 | 1.01 |
| Gerard Castillo | Independent | 2,298 | 0.84 |
| Jose Chan | Independent | 1,472 | 0.54 |
| Romeo Alday | Independent | 1,380 | 0.50 |
| Francisco Junsay Jr. | Independent | 1,337 | 0.49 |
| Juan Almonicar Jr. | Aksyon Demokratiko | 1,269 | 0.46 |
| Antonio Vicuña | Independent | 1,165 | 0.43 |
| Restituto Cancicio Jr. | Independent | 1,021 | 0.37 |
| Total | | 273,803 | 100.00 |
| Total votes | | 58,238 | – |
Source: Commission on Elections

== Manila ==
=== Mayor ===
Incumbent Mayor Alfredo Lim of the Liberal Party and Kapayapaan, Kaunlaran at Katarungan won re-election to a second term.

| Candidate | Party | Votes | % |
|---|---|---|---|
| Alfredo Lim | Liberal Party/Kapayapaan, Kaunlaran at Katarungan | 395,910 | 59.52 |
| Lito Atienza | Independent | 181,094 | 27.22 |
| Avelino Razon | Nationalist People's Coalition | 84,605 | 12.72 |
| Ma. Teresita Hizon | Independent | 1,900 | 0.29 |
| Onofre Abad | Independent | 662 | 0.10 |
| Benjamin Rivera | Independent | 558 | 0.08 |
| Matilde Limbre | Independent | 477 | 0.07 |
| Total | | 665,206 | 100.00 |
| Valid votes | | 665,206 | 96.10 |
| Invalid/blank votes | | 26,977 | 3.90 |
| Total votes | | 692,183 | 100.00 |
| Liberal Party/Kapayapaan, Kaunlaran at Katarungan hold | | | |
Source: Commission on Elections

=== Vice Mayor ===
Incumbent Vice Mayor Isko Moreno of the Nacionalista Party and Asenso Manileño won re-election to a second term.

| Candidate | Party | Votes | % |
|---|---|---|---|
| Isko Moreno | Nacionalista Party/Asenso Manileño | 498,609 | 79.86 |
| Maria Lourdes Isip-Garcia | Independent | 119,380 | 19.12 |
| Francisco Pizzara | Lapiang Manggagawa | 3,614 | 0.58 |
| Benjamin Riano | Independent | 2,765 | 0.44 |
| Total | | 624,368 | 100.00 |
| Valid votes | | 624,368 | 90.20 |
| Invalid/blank votes | | 67,815 | 9.80 |
| Total votes | | 692,183 | 100.00 |
| Nacionalista Party/Asenso Manileño hold | | | |
Source: Commission on Elections

=== City Council ===
The Manila City Council is composed of 38 councilors, 36 of whom are elected.

| Party | Votes | % | Seats |
|---|---|---|---|
| Nacionalista Party/Asenso Manileño | 837,435 | 24.29 | 9 |
| Liberal Party/Kapayapaan, Kaunlaran at Katarungan | 401,354 | 11.64 | 4 |
| Nationalist People's Coalition | 249,819 | 7.25 | 1 |
| Liberal Party | 191,386 | 5.55 | 2 |
| Nacionalista Party | 183,074 | 5.31 | 3 |
| Liberal Party/Asenso Manileño | 122,040 | 3.54 | 2 |
| Pwersa ng Masang Pilipino | 58,774 | 1.71 | 1 |
| Kapayapaan, Kaunlaran at Katarungan | 34,999 | 1.02 | 0 |
| Kilusang Bagong Lipunan | 4,882 | 0.14 | 0 |
| Lapiang Manggagawa | 983 | 0.03 | 0 |
| Philippine Green Republican Party | 518 | 0.02 | 0 |
| Independent | 1,361,700 | 39.50 | 14 |
| Total | 3,446,964 | 100.00 | 36 |
| Total votes | 702,565 | – | |
Source: Commission on Elections

==== 1st district ====
| Candidate | Party | Votes | % |
|---|---|---|---|
| Ernix Dionisio | Liberal Party | 88,334 | 11.39 |
| Erick Ian Nieva | Nationalist People's Coalition | 62,089 | 8.01 |
| Moises Lim | Liberal Party/Asenso Manileño | 56,020 | 7.23 |
| Dennis Alcoreza | Independent | 54,776 | 7.07 |
| Niño dela Cruz | Liberal Party/Kapayapaan, Kaunlaran at Katarungan | 54,510 | 7.03 |
| Irma Alfonso | Nacionalista Party/Asenso Manileño | 51,959 | 6.70 |
| Jesus Fajardo Sr. | Nacionalista Party/Asenso Manileño | 51,218 | 6.61 |
| Rolando Sy | Independent | 45,683 | 5.89 |
| Ernesto Lim | Liberal Party/Kapayapaan, Kaunlaran at Katarungan | 41,329 | 5.33 |
| Edwin Simbulan | Independent | 33,151 | 4.28 |
| Arnel Angeles | Nacionalista Party/Asenso Manileño | 32,771 | 4.23 |
| Eduardo Solis | Independent | 32,069 | 4.14 |
| Peter Ong | Liberal Party/Kapayapaan, Kaunlaran at Katarungan | 29,822 | 3.85 |
| Romeo Venturina | Liberal Party/Kapayapaan, Kaunlaran at Katarungan | 29,539 | 3.81 |
| Dale Evangelista | Nationalist People's Coalition | 14,348 | 1.85 |
| Silvestre Dumagat | Liberal Party/Kapayapaan, Kaunlaran at Katarungan | 13,243 | 1.71 |
| Let Miclat | Independent | 12,733 | 1.64 |
| Roberto Mangila | Nationalist People's Coalition | 8,331 | 1.07 |
| German Nuñez | Independent | 7,289 | 0.94 |
| Danilo Isiderio | Independent | 6,180 | 0.80 |
| Vicente Ocampo Jr. | Kapayapaan, Kaunlaran at Katarungan | 6,111 | 0.79 |
| Ireneo Duran | Independent | 5,604 | 0.72 |
| Fermin de Jesus | Nationalist People's Coalition | 5,277 | 0.68 |
| Rogelio Bergado | Kapayapaan, Kaunlaran at Katarungan | 5,144 | 0.66 |
| Ferdinand Sandoval | Nacionalista Party | 3,724 | 0.48 |
| Almario Jacinto Jr. | Kilusang Bagong Lipunan | 2,906 | 0.37 |
| Maria Ocampo | Independent | 2,829 | 0.36 |
| Exmila Rabano | Nationalist People's Coalition | 2,161 | 0.28 |
| Benedicto Rodriguez | Kilusang Bagong Lipunan | 1,976 | 0.25 |
| Rejercito Aranas | Independent | 1,943 | 0.25 |
| Bernabe Binuya | Independent | 1,844 | 0.24 |
| Efren Natividad | Independent | 1,643 | 0.21 |
| Dennis Riano | Independent | 1,454 | 0.19 |
| Romano Sacramento | Independent | 1,316 | 0.17 |
| Jaime Pepino | Independent | 1,265 | 0.16 |
| Virginia Quintero | Independent | 1,122 | 0.14 |
| Eduardo Lanuza | Lapiang Manggagawa | 983 | 0.13 |
| Vevincio Cinco | Independent | 903 | 0.12 |
| Luis Eusebio Cabuang | Independent | 651 | 0.08 |
| Fortunata Gravina | Independent | 592 | 0.08 |
| Josue Longanilla | Independent | 436 | 0.06 |
| Total | | 775,278 | 100.00 |
| Total votes | | 156,160 | – |
Source: Commission on Elections

==== 2nd district ====
| Candidate | Party | Votes | % |
|---|---|---|---|
| Marlon Lacson | Independent | 46,305 | 9.95 |
| Edward Tan | Nacionalista Party/Asenso Manileño | 44,421 | 9.54 |
| Ruben Buenaventura | Nacionalista Party/Asenso Manileño | 38,640 | 8.30 |
| Numero Lim | Independent | 36,618 | 7.87 |
| Ramon Robles | Liberal Party/Kapayapaan, Kaunlaran at Katarungan | 36,194 | 7.78 |
| Rodolfo Lacsamana | Liberal Party/Kapayapaan, Kaunlaran at Katarungan | 34,333 | 7.38 |
| Nelissa Beltran | Nacionalista Party/Asenso Manileño | 34,149 | 7.34 |
| Pacifico Laxa | Independent | 28,741 | 6.17 |
| Ivy Varona | Independent | 24,759 | 5.32 |
| Filomena Aligayo | Nacionalista Party/Asenso Manileño | 22,247 | 4.78 |
| John Mark Viceo | Independent | 20,821 | 4.47 |
| Renato Torno Jr. | Liberal Party/Kapayapaan, Kaunlaran at Katarungan | 19,193 | 4.12 |
| Lourdes Gutierrez | Liberal Party/Kapayapaan, Kaunlaran at Katarungan | 18,912 | 4.06 |
| Ruben Bunag | Liberal Party/Kapayapaan, Kaunlaran at Katarungan | 17,398 | 3.74 |
| Nida Buenaventura-Panti | Independent | 13,196 | 2.83 |
| Fernando Lopez | Nationalist People's Coalition | 10,169 | 2.18 |
| Mae Cherry Anne Doromal | Independent | 5,659 | 1.22 |
| Enrique Villegas | Independent | 4,737 | 1.02 |
| Liza Go | Kapayapaan, Kaunlaran at Katarungan | 4,500 | 0.97 |
| Jessie Peñoso | Nationalist People's Coalition | 1,586 | 0.34 |
| Joana Singson | Independent | 1,394 | 0.30 |
| Estrellita Geronimo | Independent | 902 | 0.19 |
| Herminio Manikad Jr. | Independent | 630 | 0.14 |
| Total | | 465,504 | 100.00 |
| Total votes | | 94,775 | – |
Source: Commission on Elections

==== 3rd district ====
| Candidate | Party | Votes | % |
|---|---|---|---|
| Ma. Asuncion Fugoso | Independent | 60,510 | 12.14 |
| Yul Servo | Nacionalista Party/Asenso Manileño | 60,301 | 12.10 |
| Ernesto Isip Jr. | Nacionalista Party/Asenso Manileño | 51,238 | 10.28 |
| Bernardito Ang | Nacionalista Party | 49,414 | 9.92 |
| Joel Chua | Independent | 46,561 | 9.34 |
| Ramon Morales | Independent | 40,351 | 8.10 |
| Thelma Lim | Liberal Party/Kapayapaan, Kaunlaran at Katarungan | 32,824 | 6.59 |
| Roberto Ramon Oca III | Independent | 32,283 | 6.48 |
| Larsil Silva | Independent | 28,088 | 5.64 |
| Alex Co | Nationalist People's Coalition | 23,991 | 4.81 |
| Alberto Alonzo | Nacionalista Party/Asenso Manileño | 19,721 | 3.96 |
| Alejandro Gomez | Independent | 10,573 | 2.12 |
| Paul Alvarez | Nationalist People's Coalition | 6,342 | 1.27 |
| Henryson Melon | Independent | 5,802 | 1.16 |
| Michael James Gonzalez | Liberal Party/Kapayapaan, Kaunlaran at Katarungan | 5,091 | 1.02 |
| Angelito Lopez | Independent | 4,837 | 0.97 |
| Gilbert Estrada | Independent | 4,209 | 0.84 |
| Don Neil dela Pena | Independent | 3,490 | 0.70 |
| Alfredo Isla Jr. | Nationalist People's Coalition | 2,734 | 0.55 |
| Rodrigo Abante | Independent | 2,688 | 0.54 |
| Elpidio de Sagun | Nationalist People's Coalition | 2,326 | 0.47 |
| Benito Aragon | Independent | 1,114 | 0.22 |
| Corazon Aringino | Independent | 1,083 | 0.22 |
| Ronaldo Santos | Independent | 1,042 | 0.21 |
| Merlie Gonio | Independent | 584 | 0.12 |
| Rolly Malayon | Independent | 556 | 0.11 |
| Pablo Carisosa | Independent | 539 | 0.11 |
| Total | | 498,292 | 100.00 |
| Total votes | | 103,095 | – |
Source: Commission on Elections

==== 4th district ====
| Candidate | Party | Votes | % |
|---|---|---|---|
| Don Juan Bagatsing | Independent | 59,025 | 11.18 |
| Honey Lacuna | Nacionalista Party/Asenso Manileño | 57,159 | 10.82 |
| Edward Maceda | Pwersa ng Masang Pilipino | 57,020 | 10.80 |
| Jocelyn Quintos | Independent | 56,156 | 10.63 |
| Louisito Chua | Nacionalista Party/Asenso Manileño | 51,778 | 9.80 |
| Eduardo Quintos XVI | Liberal Party/Kapayapaan, Kaunlaran at Katarungan | 41,353 | 7.83 |
| Arlan Vic Melendez | Nacionalista Party/Asenso Manileño | 40,247 | 7.62 |
| Susan Beltran | Independent | 30,573 | 5.79 |
| Gerino Tolentino Jr. | Independent | 26,721 | 5.06 |
| El Dorado Lim | Kapayapaan, Kaunlaran at Katarungan | 19,244 | 3.64 |
| Wilson Ramil | Nationalist People's Coalition | 16,362 | 3.10 |
| Christopher Ortiz | Nacionalista Party/Asenso Manileño | 12,598 | 2.39 |
| Magno Gaza | Liberal Party/Kapayapaan, Kaunlaran at Katarungan | 9,480 | 1.80 |
| Ramon Padilla | Independent | 8,858 | 1.68 |
| Richard Laurel | Liberal Party/Kapayapaan, Kaunlaran at Katarungan | 8,586 | 1.63 |
| Ernesto Cayetano | Nationalist People's Coalition | 7,694 | 1.46 |
| Melchor Trinidad | Independent | 6,527 | 1.24 |
| Alexander Lim | Independent | 4,599 | 0.87 |
| Pepito Suñiga | Nacionalista Party/Asenso Manileño | 2,984 | 0.57 |
| Milagros Coronel | Nationalist People's Coalition | 2,788 | 0.53 |
| Michael Gamaliel Plata | Independent | 2,496 | 0.47 |
| Frederick Constantino | Nationalist People's Coalition | 2,394 | 0.45 |
| Vicente Salgado | Pwersa ng Masang Pilipino | 1,754 | 0.33 |
| Norma Magat | Independent | 1,712 | 0.32 |
| Total | | 528,108 | 100.00 |
| Total votes | | 108,439 | – |
Source: Commission on Elections

==== 5th district ====
| Candidate | Party | Votes | % |
|---|---|---|---|
| Josefina Siscar | Liberal Party | 68,409 | 10.62 |
| Raymundo Yupangco | Nacionalista Party | 59,581 | 9.25 |
| Cristina Isip | Independent | 57,745 | 8.96 |
| Richard Ibay | Nacionalista Party/Asenso Manileño | 54,170 | 8.41 |
| Roberto Ortega Jr. | Independent | 54,128 | 8.40 |
| Rafael Borromeo | Independent | 51,252 | 7.95 |
| Corazon Gernale | Independent | 49,852 | 7.74 |
| Roderick Valbuena | Nacionalista Party/Asenso Manileño | 42,957 | 6.67 |
| Bartolome Atienza | Nacionalista Party/Asenso Manileño | 38,908 | 6.04 |
| Pablo Dario Ocampo IV | Liberal Party | 34,643 | 5.38 |
| Jose Maria Cabreza | Independent | 26,193 | 4.06 |
| Harry Huecas | Independent | 21,013 | 3.26 |
| Miguel Badando | Independent | 17,814 | 2.76 |
| Corina Cruz | Nacionalista Party | 14,187 | 2.20 |
| Francis Villegas | Nationalist People's Coalition | 11,597 | 1.80 |
| Turo Valenzona | Nationalist People's Coalition | 8,570 | 1.33 |
| Susan Cabigao | Nationalist People's Coalition | 8,318 | 1.29 |
| Christopher Lim | Independent | 8,243 | 1.28 |
| Marlon Lopera | Nationalist People's Coalition | 6,115 | 0.95 |
| Raymundo Corpin | Independent | 2,107 | 0.33 |
| Marlon Villarojas | Independent | 1,998 | 0.31 |
| Eduardo Dado | Independent | 1,374 | 0.21 |
| Gina Gentio | Independent | 1,247 | 0.19 |
| Lailanie Lerit | Independent | 1,228 | 0.19 |
| Ma. Ginny Clidoro | Independent | 1,037 | 0.16 |
| Reynaldo Madelo | Independent | 911 | 0.14 |
| Danny Boy Pacanut | Independent | 798 | 0.12 |
| Total | | 644,395 | 100.00 |
| Total votes | | 131,942 | – |
Source: Commission on Elections

==== 6th district ====
| Candidate | Party | Votes | % |
|---|---|---|---|
| Lou Veloso | Liberal Party/Asenso Manileño | 66,020 | 12.33 |
| Danilo Lacuna Jr. | Nacionalista Party/Asenso Manileño | 58,590 | 10.94 |
| Elizabeth Rivera | Nacionalista Party | 56,168 | 10.49 |
| Casimiro Sison | Independent | 51,215 | 9.57 |
| Luis Uy | Independent | 46,274 | 8.64 |
| Jocelyn Dawis-Asuncion | Independent | 43,854 | 8.19 |
| Carlos Castañeda | Independent | 40,645 | 7.59 |
| Richard Lontoc | Nacionalista Party/Asenso Manileño | 32,398 | 6.05 |
| Joel Par | Nacionalista Party/Asenso Manileño | 32,139 | 6.00 |
| Julio Logarta Jr. | Nationalist People's Coalition | 22,790 | 4.26 |
| Vladimir Alarique Cabigao | Independent | 16,838 | 3.15 |
| Edwin Quintos | Independent | 10,147 | 1.90 |
| Felix Majabague Jr. | Liberal Party/Kapayapaan, Kaunlaran at Katarungan | 9,547 | 1.78 |
| Vicente Alexander Quillope | Nationalist People's Coalition | 9,194 | 1.72 |
| Jose Antonio Ibay | Nationalist People's Coalition | 8,193 | 1.53 |
| George Planas | Nacionalista Party/Asenso Manileño | 6,842 | 1.28 |
| Regina Aspiras | Nationalist People's Coalition | 6,450 | 1.20 |
| Urbano Castillo | Independent | 4,341 | 0.81 |
| Rosalina Alvarez | Independent | 2,813 | 0.53 |
| Segundina Jamias | Independent | 2,717 | 0.51 |
| Romeo Concepcion | Independent | 1,765 | 0.33 |
| Eduardo Tan | Independent | 1,528 | 0.29 |
| Imelda Roca | Independent | 1,455 | 0.27 |
| Michael Anglo | Independent | 1,073 | 0.20 |
| Rafael Avecilla | Independent | 965 | 0.18 |
| Wilfredo Meniano | Independent | 908 | 0.17 |
| Mario Nicosia | Philippine Green Republican Party | 518 | 0.10 |
| Total | | 535,387 | 100.00 |
| Total votes | | 108,154 | – |
Source: Commission on Elections

== Marikina ==
=== Mayor ===
Incumbent Mayor Marides Fernando of Bagumbayan–VNP was term-limited. Bagumbayan–VNP nominated vice mayor Marion Andres, who was defeated by representative Del de Guzman of the Liberal Party.

| Candidate | Party | Votes | % |
|---|---|---|---|
| Del de Guzman | Liberal Party | 101,495 | 66.34 |
| Marion Andres | Bagumbayan–VNP | 35,162 | 22.98 |
| Alfredo Cheng | Lakas–Kampi–CMD | 16,035 | 10.48 |
| John Alexander Chong | Independent | 306 | 0.20 |
| Total | | 152,998 | 100.00 |
| Valid votes | | 152,998 | 95.93 |
| Invalid/blank votes | | 6,488 | 4.07 |
| Total votes | | 159,486 | 100.00 |
| Liberal Party gain from Bagumbayan–VNP | | | |
Source: Commission on Elections

=== Vice Mayor ===
Term-limited incumbent Vice Mayor Marion Andres of Bagumbayan–VNP ran for Mayor of Marikina. Bagumbayan–VNP nominated city councilor Thaddeus Santos Jr., who was defeated by city councilor Jose Fabian Cadiz of the Liberal Party.

| Candidate | Party | Votes | % |
|---|---|---|---|
| Jose Fabian Cadiz | Liberal Party | 84,422 | 57.91 |
| Thaddeus Santos Jr. | Bagumbayan–VNP | 46,499 | 31.90 |
| Ferdinand Marco | Nationalist People's Coalition | 9,254 | 6.35 |
| Efren Angeles | Lakas–Kampi–CMD | 4,934 | 3.38 |
| Melencia Majerano | Independent | 660 | 0.45 |
| Total | | 145,769 | 100.00 |
| Valid votes | | 145,769 | 91.40 |
| Invalid/blank votes | | 13,717 | 8.60 |
| Total votes | | 159,486 | 100.00 |
| Liberal Party gain from Bagumbayan–VNP | | | |
Source: Commission on Elections

=== City Council ===
The Marikina City Council is composed of 18 councilors, 16 of whom are elected.

| Party | Votes | % | Seats |
|---|---|---|---|
| Liberal Party | 450,449 | 44.92 | 9 |
| Bagumbayan–VNP | 379,033 | 37.80 | 6 |
| Lakas–Kampi–CMD | 76,309 | 7.61 | 1 |
| Pwersa ng Masang Pilipino | 18,419 | 1.84 | 0 |
| Nationalist People's Coalition | 3,698 | 0.37 | 0 |
| Independent | 74,786 | 7.46 | 0 |
| Total | 1,002,694 | 100.00 | 16 |
| Total votes | 159,486 | – | |
Source: Commission on Elections

==== 1st district ====
| Candidate | Party | Votes | % |
|---|---|---|---|
| Eva Paz | Liberal Party | 40,780 | 8.94 |
| Carissa Carlos | Bagumbayan–VNP | 32,233 | 7.07 |
| Joseph Banzon | Lakas–Kampi–CMD | 29,258 | 6.41 |
| Mario de Leon | Liberal Party | 27,433 | 6.01 |
| Serafin Bernardino | Bagumbayan–VNP | 27,073 | 5.93 |
| Elmer Nepomuceno | Liberal Party | 26,511 | 5.81 |
| Frankie Ayuson | Bagumbayan–VNP | 25,557 | 5.60 |
| Ronnie Acuña | Liberal Party | 23,820 | 5.22 |
| Poncianito Santos Jr. | Bagumbayan–VNP | 22,888 | 5.02 |
| Danilo del Rosario | Liberal Party | 20,822 | 4.56 |
| Arvin Jimenez | Independent | 20,589 | 4.51 |
| Rogel Santiago | Liberal Party | 20,570 | 4.51 |
| Reginaldo Reyes | Bagumbayan–VNP | 18,054 | 3.96 |
| Mariano Betic | Liberal Party | 17,247 | 3.78 |
| Igmidio Ferrer | Independent | 15,758 | 3.45 |
| Esmela David | Bagumbayan–VNP | 15,288 | 3.35 |
| Gerald Diamante | Liberal Party | 13,809 | 3.03 |
| Roy Delgado | Bagumbayan–VNP | 13,778 | 3.02 |
| Narciso dela Cruz Sr. | Bagumbayan–VNP | 13,679 | 3.00 |
| Alex Trinidad | Lakas–Kampi–CMD | 7,016 | 1.54 |
| Pedro de Guzman | Lakas–Kampi–CMD | 5,853 | 1.28 |
| Ninoy Aquino | Independent | 3,800 | 0.83 |
| Alberto Mendoza | Lakas–Kampi–CMD | 2,905 | 0.64 |
| Alfredo Arroyo Jr. | Independent | 2,739 | 0.60 |
| Danilo Tiu | Lakas–Kampi–CMD | 2,324 | 0.51 |
| Arnold Aquino | Independent | 1,769 | 0.39 |
| Felipe Cuevas | Independent | 1,731 | 0.38 |
| Emelita Sola | Independent | 1,465 | 0.32 |
| Federico Estonido | Independent | 747 | 0.16 |
| Ignacio Bael | Independent | 727 | 0.16 |
| Total | | 456,223 | 100.00 |
| Total votes | | 73,177 | – |
Source: Commission on Elections

==== 2nd district ====
| Candidate | Party | Votes | % |
|---|---|---|---|
| Mark Albert del Rosario | Liberal Party | 37,320 | 6.83 |
| Xy-Za Diazen | Liberal Party | 35,499 | 6.50 |
| Wilfred Reyes | Bagumbayan–VNP | 35,068 | 6.42 |
| Anna Dayao | Bagumbayan–VNP | 34,183 | 6.26 |
| Susana Magtubo | Liberal Party | 33,117 | 6.06 |
| Rommel Ortiz | Bagumbayan–VNP | 32,888 | 6.02 |
| Ariel Cuaresma | Liberal Party | 32,019 | 5.86 |
| Ernesto Flores | Liberal Party | 31,719 | 5.80 |
| Peter Raul Belmonte | Liberal Party | 31,344 | 5.74 |
| Alfonso Cruz | Liberal Party | 29,546 | 5.41 |
| Ponciano Ubaldo Jr. | Bagumbayan–VNP | 29,258 | 5.35 |
| Rizalina Teope | Liberal Party | 28,893 | 5.29 |
| Roberto Ponce | Bagumbayan–VNP | 28,816 | 5.27 |
| Manuel Orara | Bagumbayan–VNP | 18,629 | 3.41 |
| Jaime Cruz Jr. | Bagumbayan–VNP | 17,267 | 3.16 |
| Federico Ifurung | Bagumbayan–VNP | 14,374 | 2.63 |
| Aurelio Caparas | Pwersa ng Masang Pilipino | 7,317 | 1.34 |
| Manuel Pangilinan | Lakas–Kampi–CMD | 6,847 | 1.25 |
| Salvatore Caronite Jr. | Independent | 5,961 | 1.09 |
| Rodrigo Contado | Lakas–Kampi–CMD | 5,726 | 1.05 |
| Vincent Francis Singh | Pwersa ng Masang Pilipino | 5,384 | 0.99 |
| Fernando Rosales | Lakas–Kampi–CMD | 5,052 | 0.92 |
| Feliciano Reyes | Independent | 4,829 | 0.88 |
| Solomon Fernandez | Lakas–Kampi–CMD | 4,419 | 0.81 |
| Wilfredo Zamora | Lakas–Kampi–CMD | 4,379 | 0.80 |
| Demetrio Marquez Jr. | Pwersa ng Masang Pilipino | 3,784 | 0.69 |
| Lamberto Ramos Jr. | Nationalist People's Coalition | 3,698 | 0.68 |
| Dolores Camacho | Independent | 3,516 | 0.64 |
| Andres Garalza Jr. | Lakas–Kampi–CMD | 2,530 | 0.46 |
| Arthur Limpin | Pwersa ng Masang Pilipino | 1,934 | 0.35 |
| Manuel Miralles | Independent | 1,899 | 0.35 |
| Rodolfo Pascual | Independent | 1,862 | 0.34 |
| Zosimo Balingit | Independent | 1,825 | 0.33 |
| Edgardo Velasquez | Independent | 1,798 | 0.33 |
| Julio Antiporda | Independent | 1,710 | 0.31 |
| Angel Dacalos | Independent | 1,224 | 0.22 |
| Saulfred Soliguen | Independent | 837 | 0.15 |
| Total | | 546,471 | 100.00 |
| Total votes | | 86,309 | – |
Source: Commission on Elections

== Muntinlupa ==
=== Mayor ===
Incumbent Mayor Aldrin San Pedro of Lakas–Kampi–CMD won re-election to a second term.

| Candidate | Party | Votes | % |
|---|---|---|---|
| Aldrin San Pedro | Lakas–Kampi–CMD | 108,091 | 58.27 |
| Jaime Fresnedi | Liberal Party | 76,808 | 41.41 |
| Oscar Marmeto | Independent | 600 | 0.32 |
| Total | | 185,499 | 100.00 |
| Valid votes | | 185,499 | 96.93 |
| Invalid/blank votes | | 5,869 | 3.07 |
| Total votes | | 191,368 | 100.00 |
| Lakas–Kampi–CMD hold | | | |
Source: Commission on Elections

=== Vice Mayor ===
Incumbent Vice Mayor Artemio Simundac of Lakas–Kampi–CMD won re-election to a second term.

| Candidate | Party | Votes | % |
|---|---|---|---|
| Artemio Simundac | Lakas–Kampi–CMD | 94,159 | 53.97 |
| Marissa Rongavilla | Liberal Party | 80,309 | 46.03 |
| Total | | 174,468 | 100.00 |
| Valid votes | | 174,468 | 91.17 |
| Invalid/blank votes | | 16,900 | 8.83 |
| Total votes | | 191,368 | 100.00 |
| Lakas–Kampi–CMD hold | | | |
Source: Commission on Elections

=== City Council ===
The Muntinlupa City Council is composed of 18 councilors, 16 of whom are elected.

| Party | Votes | % | Seats |
|---|---|---|---|
| Lakas–Kampi–CMD | 518,834 | 41.97 | 10 |
| Liberal Party | 399,389 | 32.31 | 3 |
| Pwersa ng Masang Pilipino | 102,582 | 8.30 | 2 |
| Nacionalista Party | 62,732 | 5.07 | 0 |
| Independent | 152,637 | 12.35 | 1 |
| Total | 1,236,174 | 100.00 | 16 |
| Total votes | 191,368 | – | |
Source: Commission on Elections

==== 1st district ====
| Candidate | Party | Votes | % |
|---|---|---|---|
| Raul Corro | Lakas–Kampi–CMD | 58,555 | 7.88 |
| Patricio Boncayao Jr. | Liberal Party | 53,999 | 7.27 |
| Margarita Amythyst Labios | Lakas–Kampi–CMD | 51,208 | 6.89 |
| Baldomero Niefes | Lakas–Kampi–CMD | 49,648 | 6.68 |
| Allen Ampaya | Liberal Party | 47,543 | 6.40 |
| Alexander Diaz | Lakas–Kampi–CMD | 47,521 | 6.40 |
| Ringo Teves | Lakas–Kampi–CMD | 41,554 | 5.59 |
| Dan Hubert Barlis | Lakas–Kampi–CMD | 40,613 | 5.47 |
| Marita Calalang | Pwersa ng Masang Pilipino | 37,579 | 5.06 |
| Abegail Camilon | Nacionalista Party | 34,983 | 4.71 |
| Ma. Victoria dela Rea | Lakas–Kampi–CMD | 32,969 | 4.44 |
| Louisito Arciaga | Nacionalista Party | 27,749 | 3.74 |
| Ronald Solomon | Liberal Party | 26,207 | 3.53 |
| Carlo Argana | Liberal Party | 26,054 | 3.51 |
| Gerrovi Hernandez | Liberal Party | 24,922 | 3.35 |
| Gabriel Dolleton | Liberal Party | 24,757 | 3.33 |
| Rommel Abanto | Independent | 24,118 | 3.25 |
| Roderick Lorica | Liberal Party | 24,057 | 3.24 |
| Edgardo Trozado | Independent | 23,787 | 3.20 |
| Espino Arciaga | Independent | 18,988 | 2.56 |
| Benjiebel Trozado | Liberal Party | 15,195 | 2.05 |
| Zosimo Ponce | Independent | 3,018 | 0.41 |
| Gregorio Abanes Jr. | Independent | 2,368 | 0.32 |
| Romarico Calderon | Independent | 2,282 | 0.31 |
| Epifanio Caro Jr. | Independent | 2,129 | 0.29 |
| Antonio Oliva | Independent | 1,089 | 0.15 |
| Total | | 742,892 | 100.00 |
| Total votes | | 110,507 | – |
Source: Commission on Elections

==== 2nd district ====
| Candidate | Party | Votes | % |
|---|---|---|---|
| Luvi Constantino | Lakas–Kampi–CMD | 40,920 | 8.30 |
| Robert Abas | Lakas–Kampi–CMD | 36,027 | 7.30 |
| Neptali Santiago | Liberal Party | 34,663 | 7.03 |
| Joselito Arevalo | Pwersa ng Masang Pilipino | 34,263 | 6.95 |
| Roberto Baes | Lakas–Kampi–CMD | 33,423 | 6.78 |
| Elmer Espeleta | Independent | 32,505 | 6.59 |
| Rafael Sevilla | Lakas–Kampi–CMD | 32,189 | 6.53 |
| Vergel Ulanday | Pwersa ng Masang Pilipino | 30,740 | 6.23 |
| Grace Gonzaga | Lakas–Kampi–CMD | 29,311 | 5.94 |
| Rufino Joaquin | Lakas–Kampi–CMD | 24,896 | 5.05 |
| Geraldine So | Independent | 20,950 | 4.25 |
| Rodolfo Moldez | Liberal Party | 20,123 | 4.08 |
| Danidon Nolasco | Liberal Party | 19,215 | 3.90 |
| Ma. Consuelo Navarro | Liberal Party | 18,949 | 3.84 |
| Allan Miranda | Liberal Party | 18,750 | 3.80 |
| Ariel Nofuente | Liberal Party | 17,198 | 3.49 |
| Bernardo Escobedo | Liberal Party | 16,316 | 3.31 |
| Delia Pascual | Liberal Party | 11,441 | 2.32 |
| Santiago Carlos Jr. | Independent | 9,286 | 1.88 |
| Alejandro delos Reyes | Independent | 2,505 | 0.51 |
| Edwin Rivera | Independent | 2,403 | 0.49 |
| Christopher Balbanero | Independent | 2,275 | 0.46 |
| Willie Frias | Independent | 1,247 | 0.25 |
| Nelso Pausal | Independent | 1,241 | 0.25 |
| Joselito Salud | Independent | 1,204 | 0.24 |
| Nicholo Sunpayco | Independent | 672 | 0.14 |
| Alberto Tabulog | Independent | 570 | 0.12 |
| Total | | 493,282 | 100.00 |
| Total votes | | 80,861 | – |
Source: Commission on Elections

== Navotas ==
=== Mayor ===
Term-limited incumbent Mayor Toby Tiangco of Partido Navoteño ran for the House of Representatives in Navotas' lone district. Partido Navoteño nominated Tiangco's brother, John Rey Tiangco, who won the election unopposed.

| Candidate | Party | Votes | % |
|---|---|---|---|
| John Rey Tiangco | Partido Navoteño | 76,158 | 100.00 |
| Total | | 76,158 | 100.00 |
| Valid votes | | 76,158 | 84.03 |
| Invalid/blank votes | | 14,472 | 15.97 |
| Total votes | | 90,630 | 100.00 |
| Partido Navoteño hold | | | |
Source: Commission on Elections

=== Vice Mayor ===
Incumbent Vice Mayor Patrick Joseph Javier of Partido Navoteño won re-election to a third term unopposed.

| Candidate | Party | Votes | % |
|---|---|---|---|
| Patrick Joseph Javier | Partido Navoteño | 73,576 | 100.00 |
| Total | | 73,576 | 100.00 |
| Valid votes | | 73,576 | 81.18 |
| Invalid/blank votes | | 17,054 | 18.82 |
| Total votes | | 90,630 | 100.00 |
| Partido Navoteño hold | | | |
Source: Commission on Elections

=== City Council ===
The Navotas City Council is composed of 14 councilors, 12 of whom are elected.

| Party | Votes | % | Seats |
|---|---|---|---|
| Partido Navoteño | 300,363 | 70.77 | 9 |
| Independent | 124,088 | 29.23 | 3 |
| Total | 424,451 | 100.00 | 12 |
| Total votes | 90,630 | – | |
Source: Commission on Elections

==== 1st district ====
| Candidate | Party | Votes | % |
|---|---|---|---|
| Domingo Elape | Partido Navoteño | 30,343 | 13.66 |
| Richard San Juan | Partido Navoteño | 26,105 | 11.75 |
| Alfredo Vicencio | Partido Navoteño | 25,687 | 11.56 |
| Edgardo Maño | Partido Navoteño | 25,270 | 11.38 |
| Reynaldo Monroy | Independent | 22,387 | 10.08 |
| Bernardo Nazal | Partido Navoteño | 22,228 | 10.01 |
| Ernani Calayag | Partido Navoteño | 21,306 | 9.59 |
| Jose Norman Magpoc | Independent | 16,354 | 7.36 |
| Reccelle Miralles | Independent | 11,187 | 5.04 |
| Edita Santos | Independent | 7,528 | 3.39 |
| Avelino Nacar Jr. | Independent | 6,938 | 3.12 |
| Ricardo Balasa | Independent | 6,805 | 3.06 |
| Total | | 222,138 | 100.00 |
| Total votes | | 46,414 | – |
Source: Commission on Elections

==== 2nd district ====
| Candidate | Party | Votes | % |
|---|---|---|---|
| Clint Geronimo | Partido Navoteño | 30,342 | 15.00 |
| Ma. Elsa Bautista-Teodoro | Independent | 27,416 | 13.55 |
| Ma. Lourdes del Rosario | Partido Navoteño | 27,177 | 13.43 |
| Enrico Gino-gino | Partido Navoteño | 26,952 | 13.32 |
| Analiza Lupisan | Partido Navoteño | 25,912 | 12.81 |
| Ronaldo Naval | Independent | 25,473 | 12.59 |
| Cesar Santos | Partido Navoteño | 21,335 | 10.55 |
| Florencio Araga | Partido Navoteño | 17,706 | 8.75 |
| Total | | 202,313 | 100.00 |
| Total votes | | 44,216 | – |
Source: Commission on Elections

== Parañaque ==
=== Mayor ===
Term-limited incumbent Mayor Florencio Bernabe Jr. of Lakas–Kampi–CMD won re-election to a third term.

| Candidate | Party | Votes | % |
|---|---|---|---|
| Florencio Bernabe Jr. | Lakas–Kampi–CMD | 87,127 | 44.24 |
| Eduardo Zialcita | Nacionalista Party | 70,372 | 35.73 |
| Joey Marquez | Independent | 39,459 | 20.03 |
| Total | | 196,958 | 100.00 |
| Valid votes | | 196,958 | 96.38 |
| Invalid/blank votes | | 7,399 | 3.62 |
| Total votes | | 204,357 | 100.00 |
| Lakas–Kampi–CMD hold | | | |
Source: Commission on Elections

=== Vice Mayor ===
Incumbent Vice Mayor Gustavo Tambunting of Lakas–Kampi–CMD won re-election to a third term.

| Candidate | Party | Votes | % |
|---|---|---|---|
| Gustavo Tambunting | Lakas–Kampi–CMD | 101,407 | 54.43 |
| Anjo Yllana | Pwersa ng Masang Pilipino | 84,897 | 45.57 |
| Total | | 186,304 | 100.00 |
| Valid votes | | 186,304 | 91.17 |
| Invalid/blank votes | | 18,053 | 8.83 |
| Total votes | | 204,357 | 100.00 |
| Lakas–Kampi–CMD hold | | | |
Source: Commission on Elections

=== City Council ===
The Parañaque City Council is composed of 18 councilors, 16 of whom are elected.

| Party | Votes | % | Seats |
|---|---|---|---|
| Lakas–Kampi–CMD | 669,398 | 52.75 | 12 |
| Nacionalista Party | 178,873 | 14.10 | 2 |
| Liberal Party | 170,819 | 13.46 | 1 |
| Pwersa ng Masang Pilipino | 113,990 | 8.98 | 1 |
| Nationalist People's Coalition | 42,382 | 3.34 | 0 |
| Independent | 93,425 | 7.36 | 0 |
| Total | 1,268,887 | 100.00 | 16 |
| Total votes | 204,357 | – | |
Source: Commission on Elections

==== 1st district ====
| Candidate | Party | Votes | % |
|---|---|---|---|
| Eric Olivarez | Liberal Party | 51,527 | 9.23 |
| Roselle Nava | Nacionalista Party | 46,464 | 8.32 |
| Jason Webb | Lakas–Kampi–CMD | 41,955 | 7.51 |
| Raquel Gabriel | Lakas–Kampi–CMD | 41,329 | 7.40 |
| Brillante Inciong | Nacionalista Party | 37,275 | 6.67 |
| Rufino Allanigue | Lakas–Kampi–CMD | 31,718 | 5.68 |
| Vanesa Alma Salic | Lakas–Kampi–CMD | 30,060 | 5.38 |
| Ricardo Baes Jr. | Lakas–Kampi–CMD | 29,929 | 5.36 |
| Joy delos Santos | Lakas–Kampi–CMD | 27,194 | 4.87 |
| Lorna Campano | Liberal Party | 24,574 | 4.40 |
| Florante Romey Jr. | Lakas–Kampi–CMD | 24,002 | 4.30 |
| Jaime Nery Jr. | Liberal Party | 23,700 | 4.24 |
| Joan Villafuerte-Densing | Nationalist People's Coalition | 23,655 | 4.24 |
| Dong Percival Brigola | Nacionalista Party | 20,838 | 3.73 |
| Benito Aragon | Liberal Party | 16,188 | 2.90 |
| Abundio Ferrer | Liberal Party | 14,763 | 2.64 |
| Dino Ross | Independent | 12,758 | 2.28 |
| Audie Daddy de Leon | Independent | 10,961 | 1.96 |
| Jon Salvador | Lakas–Kampi–CMD | 10,318 | 1.85 |
| Jerry Lucas Biboso | Nationalist People's Coalition | 8,364 | 1.50 |
| Gaspar Bobadilla | Independent | 7,267 | 1.30 |
| John Arcilla | Nationalist People's Coalition | 5,251 | 0.94 |
| Antonio Duñgo | Nationalist People's Coalition | 5,112 | 0.92 |
| Eulalio Unizan | Independent | 3,934 | 0.70 |
| Fortunato Yabut | Independent | 2,699 | 0.48 |
| Julio Estrera | Independent | 2,642 | 0.47 |
| Axel Gonzalez | Independent | 1,838 | 0.33 |
| Andre Roy San Juan | Independent | 1,375 | 0.25 |
| Tito Isunza | Independent | 770 | 0.14 |
| Total | | 558,460 | 100.00 |
| Total votes | | 87,073 | – |
Source: Commission on Elections

==== 2nd district ====
| Candidate | Party | Votes | % |
|---|---|---|---|
| Jose Enrico Golez | Lakas–Kampi–CMD | 78,548 | 11.06 |
| Val Sotto | Lakas–Kampi–CMD | 58,956 | 8.30 |
| Edwin Benzon | Lakas–Kampi–CMD | 55,142 | 7.76 |
| Florencio Bernabe III | Lakas–Kampi–CMD | 54,570 | 7.68 |
| Florencia Amurao | Lakas–Kampi–CMD | 51,006 | 7.18 |
| Conchita Bustamante | Lakas–Kampi–CMD | 49,072 | 6.91 |
| John Ryan Yllana | Pwersa ng Masang Pilipino | 47,838 | 6.73 |
| Carlito Antipuesto | Lakas–Kampi–CMD | 45,800 | 6.45 |
| Binky Favis | Liberal Party | 40,067 | 5.64 |
| Hilario Bonsol | Lakas–Kampi–CMD | 39,799 | 5.60 |
| Generoso Puzon | Pwersa ng Masang Pilipino | 35,885 | 5.05 |
| Maritess de Asis | Nacionalista Party | 33,238 | 4.68 |
| Karlo Davila | Nacionalista Party | 25,713 | 3.62 |
| Felix Resuello | Pwersa ng Masang Pilipino | 17,354 | 2.44 |
| Arnold Castillo | Independent | 16,695 | 2.35 |
| Maria Severina Cadano | Nacionalista Party | 15,345 | 2.16 |
| Ramon Panaligan | Pwersa ng Masang Pilipino | 12,913 | 1.82 |
| Roberto Serrano Jr. | Independent | 11,840 | 1.67 |
| Albert Visitacion Jr. | Independent | 9,017 | 1.27 |
| Chito Serrano | Independent | 7,073 | 1.00 |
| Ronald Macaraig | Independent | 4,556 | 0.64 |
| Total | | 710,427 | 100.00 |
| Total votes | | 117,284 | – |
Source: Commission on Elections

== Pasay ==
=== Mayor ===
Incumbent Mayor Wenceslao Trinidad of the Nacionalista Party ran for a full first term, but was defeated by vice mayor Antonino Calixto of the Liberal Party.

| Candidate | Party | Votes | % |
|---|---|---|---|
| Antonino Calixto | Liberal Party | 59,087 | 33.71 |
| Connie Dy | Pwersa ng Masang Pilipino | 56,576 | 32.27 |
| Wenceslao Trinidad | Nacionalista Party | 46,178 | 26.34 |
| Ricardo Santos | Bigkis Pinoy | 12,616 | 7.20 |
| Ralph Joseph Lim | Independent | 298 | 0.17 |
| Romulo Marcelo | Independent | 281 | 0.16 |
| Francisco Penaflor | Independent | 268 | 0.15 |
| Total | | 175,304 | 100.00 |
| Valid votes | | 175,304 | 95.47 |
| Invalid/blank votes | | 8,314 | 4.53 |
| Total votes | | 183,618 | 100.00 |
| Liberal Party gain from Nacionalista Party | | | |
Source: Commission on Elections

=== Vice Mayor ===
Term-limited incumbent Vice Mayor Antonino Calixto of the Liberal Party ran for Mayor of Pasay. The Liberal Party nominated city councilor Arnel Regino Arceo, who was defeated by city councilor Marlon Pesebre of Pwersa ng Masang Pilipino.

| Candidate | Party | Votes | % |
|---|---|---|---|
| Marlon Pesebre | Pwersa ng Masang Pilipino | 58,942 | 35.08 |
| Noel Bayona | PDP–Laban | 32,826 | 19.54 |
| Greg Alcera | Nacionalista Party | 31,776 | 18.91 |
| Arnel Regino Arceo | Liberal Party | 27,257 | 16.22 |
| Leopoldo Calixto III | Bigkis Pinoy | 17,216 | 10.25 |
| Total | | 168,017 | 100.00 |
| Valid votes | | 168,017 | 91.50 |
| Invalid/blank votes | | 15,601 | 8.50 |
| Total votes | | 183,618 | 100.00 |
| Pwersa ng Masang Pilipino gain from Liberal Party | | | |
Source: Commission on Elections

=== City Council ===
The Pasay City Council is composed of 14 councilors, 12 of whom are elected.

| Party | Votes | % | Seats |
|---|---|---|---|
| Nacionalista Party | 233,206 | 26.37 | 5 |
| Pwersa ng Masang Pilipino | 200,130 | 22.63 | 2 |
| Liberal Party | 187,094 | 21.15 | 3 |
| PDP–Laban | 70,275 | 7.95 | 1 |
| Bigkis Pinoy | 67,272 | 7.61 | 0 |
| Nationalist People's Coalition | 11,716 | 1.32 | 0 |
| Bangon Pilipinas | 1,800 | 0.20 | 0 |
| Independent | 112,949 | 12.77 | 1 |
| Total | 884,442 | 100.00 | 12 |
| Total votes | 183,618 | – | |
Source: Commission on Elections

==== 1st district ====
| Candidate | Party | Votes | % |
|---|---|---|---|
| Mary Grace Santos | Pwersa ng Masang Pilipino | 37,798 | 8.73 |
| Richard Advincula | Liberal Party | 31,557 | 7.29 |
| Lexter Ibay | Nacionalista Party | 31,163 | 7.20 |
| Eduardo Advincula | Independent | 22,295 | 5.15 |
| Alberto Alvina | Nacionalista Party | 22,186 | 5.12 |
| Pinky Lyn Francisco | Nacionalista Party | 21,281 | 4.91 |
| Ma. Luisa Petallo | Liberal Party | 19,811 | 4.57 |
| Romulo Cabrera | Pwersa ng Masang Pilipino | 19,723 | 4.55 |
| Angelo Decena | Pwersa ng Masang Pilipino | 17,821 | 4.11 |
| Charlie Chavez | Nacionalista Party | 17,434 | 4.03 |
| Maria Lita Landagan | Nacionalista Party | 16,033 | 3.70 |
| Reynaldo Mateo | Liberal Party | 15,681 | 3.62 |
| Florencio Mateo | Nacionalista Party | 15,132 | 3.49 |
| Jaivic Lim | Pwersa ng Masang Pilipino | 14,737 | 3.40 |
| Normandy Pangilinan | Independent | 12,808 | 2.96 |
| Reynaldo Bayona Jr. | Independent | 11,772 | 2.72 |
| Jose Mañez | PDP–Laban | 8,869 | 2.05 |
| Arcadio Corral | Bigkis Pinoy | 8,354 | 1.93 |
| Teodulo Lorca Jr. | Liberal Party | 7,701 | 1.78 |
| Lolita Miranda | Liberal Party | 7,521 | 1.74 |
| Benjamin Lim Jr. | Bigkis Pinoy | 7,052 | 1.63 |
| Ronald Langub | Pwersa ng Masang Pilipino | 6,607 | 1.53 |
| Rossano Cuneta | Independent | 5,937 | 1.37 |
| Primo Von Catalan III | Pwersa ng Masang Pilipino | 5,773 | 1.33 |
| Jaime Bontilao | PDP–Laban | 5,410 | 1.25 |
| Valentino Ilagan | Bigkis Pinoy | 5,146 | 1.19 |
| Antonio Co | Bigkis Pinoy | 4,897 | 1.13 |
| Lamberto Roque | Liberal Party | 4,782 | 1.10 |
| Edmund Cayetano | Independent | 4,497 | 1.04 |
| Eduardo Cruz | PDP–Laban | 4,197 | 0.97 |
| Jose Allan Tebelin | PDP–Laban | 2,715 | 0.63 |
| Celestino Hilvano | PDP–Laban | 2,454 | 0.57 |
| Rolando Cipriano | PDP–Laban | 2,146 | 0.50 |
| Abelardo Rogacion | Bigkis Pinoy | 1,999 | 0.46 |
| Domingo Solangon | Bangon Pilipinas | 1,800 | 0.42 |
| Isagani Lisaca | Bigkis Pinoy | 1,755 | 0.41 |
| Michael Angelo Gabriel | Independent | 1,461 | 0.34 |
| Maria Remedios Diaz | Independent | 1,191 | 0.27 |
| Alejandro Mendoza Jr. | Independent | 1,107 | 0.26 |
| Antonio Obiña | Independent | 975 | 0.23 |
| Liong Ming Sy | Independent | 880 | 0.20 |
| Juanito Cacayan Jr. | Independent | 635 | 0.15 |
| Total | | 433,093 | 100.00 |
| Total votes | | 90,771 | – |
Source: Commission on Elections

==== 2nd district ====
| Candidate | Party | Votes | % |
|---|---|---|---|
| Reynaldo Padua | Liberal Party | 31,895 | 7.07 |
| Edita Vergel de Dios | Nacionalista Party | 28,113 | 6.23 |
| Ileana Ibay | Nacionalista Party | 27,302 | 6.05 |
| Ian Vendivel | Liberal Party | 25,032 | 5.55 |
| Brian Bayona | PDP–Laban | 23,694 | 5.25 |
| Arvin Tolentino | Pwersa ng Masang Pilipino | 22,788 | 5.05 |
| Joven Claudio | Liberal Party | 21,459 | 4.75 |
| Aileen Lopez | Independent | 21,134 | 4.68 |
| Jennifer Panaligan | Pwersa ng Masang Pilipino | 19,825 | 4.39 |
| Marissa de Leon | Bigkis Pinoy | 16,978 | 3.76 |
| Jim Baliad | Nacionalista Party | 16,648 | 3.69 |
| Alvin Cruzin | Pwersa ng Masang Pilipino | 16,448 | 3.64 |
| Editha Manguerra | Independent | 15,967 | 3.54 |
| Elmer Mitra Jr. | Pwersa ng Masang Pilipino | 14,603 | 3.24 |
| Erlinda Hilario | Pwersa ng Masang Pilipino | 14,423 | 3.20 |
| Montgomery Veluz | Nacionalista Party | 13,769 | 3.05 |
| Emmanuel Cinco | Nacionalista Party | 13,694 | 3.03 |
| Janet Cortes | Nacionalista Party | 10,451 | 2.32 |
| Joseph Norton Elipio | Liberal Party | 9,629 | 2.13 |
| Juanito Arcangel | Pwersa ng Masang Pilipino | 9,584 | 2.12 |
| Reynold Campo | PDP–Laban | 9,549 | 2.12 |
| Chris Barrios | Liberal Party | 6,568 | 1.46 |
| Rolando Bacar | Bigkis Pinoy | 6,066 | 1.34 |
| Ruben Tengco | Liberal Party | 5,458 | 1.21 |
| Generoso Cabrido Jr. | Bigkis Pinoy | 5,405 | 1.20 |
| Rolando dela Cruz | Nationalist People's Coalition | 5,256 | 1.16 |
| Valeriano Magbanua | PDP–Laban | 4,219 | 0.93 |
| Benito Patinio | Bigkis Pinoy | 4,180 | 0.93 |
| Imelda San Jose | Nationalist People's Coalition | 3,587 | 0.79 |
| Rizalito Enriquez | PDP–Laban | 3,505 | 0.78 |
| Fernan Abriol Santos | Independent | 3,479 | 0.77 |
| Edgar Louie Eusebio | Independent | 3,399 | 0.75 |
| Christopher Tan | Bigkis Pinoy | 3,351 | 0.74 |
| Pepito Nabong | PDP–Laban | 2,306 | 0.51 |
| Mark Anthony San Juan | Nationalist People's Coalition | 2,215 | 0.49 |
| Pedro Ordiales | Bigkis Pinoy | 2,089 | 0.46 |
| Vicente Gine | Independent | 1,624 | 0.36 |
| Rodolfo Villaluna Jr. | PDP–Laban | 1,211 | 0.27 |
| Rogelio Estrella | Independent | 1,194 | 0.26 |
| Saturnino Espeleta | Independent | 694 | 0.15 |
| Salvador Quimpo III | Nationalist People's Coalition | 658 | 0.15 |
| Romeo Franks | Independent | 564 | 0.12 |
| Richard Rivera | Independent | 559 | 0.12 |
| Crisber Collantes | Independent | 557 | 0.12 |
| Arturo Quozon | Independent | 220 | 0.05 |
| Total | | 451,349 | 100.00 |
| Total votes | | 92,847 | – |
Source: Commission on Elections

== Pasig ==
=== Mayor ===
Incumbent Mayor Bobby Eusebio of the Nacionalista Party won re-election to a second term.

| Candidate | Party | Votes | % |
|---|---|---|---|
| Bobby Eusebio | Nacionalista Party | 206,438 | 83.71 |
| Ricardo Reyes | Liberal Party | 36,403 | 14.76 |
| Lucila Hernandez | Independent | 3,760 | 1.52 |
| Total | | 246,601 | 100.00 |
| Valid votes | | 246,601 | 94.28 |
| Invalid/blank votes | | 14,966 | 5.72 |
| Total votes | | 261,567 | 100.00 |
| Nacionalista Party hold | | | |
Source: Commission on Elections

=== Vice Mayor ===
Incumbent Vice Mayor Yoyong Martirez of the Nacionalista Party won re-election to a third term.

| Candidate | Party | Votes | % |
|---|---|---|---|
| Yoyong Martirez | Nacionalista Party | 129,115 | 55.88 |
| Wainwright Rivera | Kapayapaan, Kaunlaran at Katarungan | 74,856 | 32.39 |
| Abelardo Javier | Liberal Party | 27,103 | 11.73 |
| Total | | 231,074 | 100.00 |
| Valid votes | | 231,074 | 88.34 |
| Invalid/blank votes | | 30,493 | 11.66 |
| Total votes | | 261,567 | 100.00 |
| Nacionalista Party hold | | | |
Source: Commission on Elections

=== City Council ===
The Pasig City Council is composed of 14 councilors, 12 of whom are elected.

| Party | Votes | % | Seats |
|---|---|---|---|
| Nacionalista Party | 987,615 | 80.00 | 11 |
| Liberal Party | 219,045 | 17.74 | 1 |
| Independent | 27,831 | 2.25 | 0 |
| Total | 1,234,491 | 100.00 | 12 |
| Total votes | 261,567 | – | |
Source: Commission on Elections

==== 1st district ====
| Candidate | Party | Votes | % |
|---|---|---|---|
| Iyo Christian Bernardo | Nacionalista Party | 66,215 | 12.49 |
| Christian Sia | Liberal Party | 59,724 | 11.27 |
| Reynaldo San Buenaventura III | Nacionalista Party | 56,664 | 10.69 |
| Regino Balderrama | Nacionalista Party | 51,256 | 9.67 |
| Augustin Alexee Santiago | Nacionalista Party | 49,832 | 9.40 |
| Lorna Bernardo | Nacionalista Party | 45,687 | 8.62 |
| Fortunato Co Jr. | Nacionalista Party | 43,557 | 8.22 |
| Renato Lipana | Nacionalista Party | 40,152 | 7.57 |
| Onofre Capco | Nacionalista Party | 36,981 | 6.98 |
| Jose Matthew Tatco IV | Liberal Party | 36,403 | 6.87 |
| Angelito Comsti | Nacionalista Party | 29,511 | 5.57 |
| Jose Crisanto Gonzales | Liberal Party | 9,576 | 1.81 |
| Jose Plaridel Ycay III | Independent | 4,593 | 0.87 |
| Total | | 530,151 | 100.00 |
| Total votes | | 110,422 | – |
Source: Commission on Elections

==== 2nd district ====
| Candidate | Party | Votes | % |
|---|---|---|---|
| Richard Eusebio | Nacionalista Party | 104,060 | 14.77 |
| Rodrigo Asilo | Nacionalista Party | 98,273 | 13.95 |
| Reynaldo Raymundo | Nacionalista Party | 97,030 | 13.78 |
| Roberto Benito | Nacionalista Party | 95,735 | 13.59 |
| Virgilio del Rosario | Nacionalista Party | 93,076 | 13.21 |
| Charmie Benavides | Nacionalista Party | 79,586 | 11.30 |
| Macario Cruz | Liberal Party | 58,299 | 8.28 |
| Roland Vasquez | Liberal Party | 37,110 | 5.27 |
| Emil Ronald Ambagan | Liberal Party | 17,933 | 2.55 |
| Teofilo Pascual | Independent | 12,546 | 1.78 |
| Alberto Vidayo | Independent | 10,692 | 1.52 |
| Total | | 704,340 | 100.00 |
| Total votes | | 151,145 | – |
Source: Commission on Elections

== Pateros ==
=== Mayor ===
Incumbent Mayor Jaime Medina of the Nacionalista Party won re-election to a second term.

| Candidate | Party | Votes | % |
|---|---|---|---|
| Jaime Medina | Nacionalista Party | 18,322 | 74.84 |
| Patrick Umali | Independent | 6,161 | 25.16 |
| Total | | 24,483 | 100.00 |
| Valid votes | | 24,483 | 94.88 |
| Invalid/blank votes | | 1,321 | 5.12 |
| Total votes | | 25,804 | 100.00 |
| Nacionalista Party hold | | | |
Source: Commission on Elections

=== Vice Mayor ===
Incumbent Vice Mayor Jose Jonathan Sanchez won re-election to a second term as an independent.

| Candidate | Party | Votes | % |
|---|---|---|---|
| Jose Jonathan Sanchez | Independent | 13,671 | 57.82 |
| Jorge Nicdao | Pwersa ng Masang Pilipino | 9,975 | 42.18 |
| Total | | 23,646 | 100.00 |
| Valid votes | | 23,646 | 91.64 |
| Invalid/blank votes | | 2,158 | 8.36 |
| Total votes | | 25,804 | 100.00 |
| Independent hold | | | |
Source: Commission on Elections

=== Municipal Council ===
The Pateros Municipal Council is composed of 14 councilors, 12 of whom are elected.

| Party | Votes | % | Seats |
|---|---|---|---|
| Pwersa ng Masang Pilipino | 39,032 | 30.57 | 3 |
| Nacionalista Party | 38,381 | 30.06 | 5 |
| Liberal Party | 14,131 | 11.07 | 1 |
| Independent | 36,132 | 28.30 | 3 |
| Total | 127,676 | 100.00 | 12 |
| Total votes | 25,804 | – | |
Source: Commission on Elections

==== 1st district ====
| Candidate | Party | Votes | % |
|---|---|---|---|
| Gerald German | Pwersa ng Masang Pilipino | 7,828 | 11.02 |
| Lauro Capco | Pwersa ng Masang Pilipino | 7,571 | 10.66 |
| Milaor Villegas | Nacionalista Party | 7,098 | 10.00 |
| Allan dela Cruz | Liberal Party | 7,003 | 9.86 |
| Rosario Muñoz | Nacionalista Party | 5,866 | 8.26 |
| Dominador Rosales Jr. | Nacionalista Party | 5,861 | 8.25 |
| Pio Joel Reyes | Independent | 5,570 | 7.84 |
| Jaime Flores | Nacionalista Party | 5,459 | 7.69 |
| Oscar Ongmanchi | Pwersa ng Masang Pilipino | 5,211 | 7.34 |
| Rolando Dolon | Nacionalista Party | 4,263 | 6.00 |
| Antonio Saez | Pwersa ng Masang Pilipino | 3,804 | 5.36 |
| Ruel Gatpayat | Liberal Party | 3,661 | 5.16 |
| Joseph Manzon | Independent | 1,810 | 2.55 |
| Total | | 71,005 | 100.00 |
| Total votes | | 14,476 | – |
Source: Commission on Elections

==== 2nd district ====
| Candidate | Party | Votes | % |
|---|---|---|---|
| Ernesto Cortez | Independent | 5,689 | 10.04 |
| Alberto Tañga | Pwersa ng Masang Pilipino | 5,602 | 9.89 |
| Jeric Reyes | Nacionalista Party | 4,999 | 8.82 |
| Maria Kathleen Ampe | Independent | 4,967 | 8.76 |
| Daisy Reyes | Nacionalista Party | 4,835 | 8.53 |
| Edgar Noel Castillo | Independent | 4,442 | 7.84 |
| Allan Dennis Mangoba | Pwersa ng Masang Pilipino | 4,244 | 7.49 |
| Gerardo Sanchez | Independent | 4,043 | 7.13 |
| Joseph Elmer Reyes | Independent | 4,042 | 7.13 |
| Joseph Dayco | Independent | 3,743 | 6.60 |
| Jowell Raymundo | Pwersa ng Masang Pilipino | 3,334 | 5.88 |
| Julio Ungco Jr. | Liberal Party | 1,970 | 3.48 |
| Ernesto Gallano | Liberal Party | 1,497 | 2.64 |
| Arturo Enriquez | Pwersa ng Masang Pilipino | 1,438 | 2.54 |
| Crisanto Arteza Jr. | Independent | 818 | 1.44 |
| Ricardo Santos | Independent | 493 | 0.87 |
| Angelito Yari | Independent | 316 | 0.56 |
| Arturo Arancel | Independent | 199 | 0.35 |
| Total | | 56,671 | 100.00 |
| Total votes | | 11,328 | – |
Source: Commission on Elections

== Quezon City ==
=== Mayor ===
Term-limited incumbent Mayor Feliciano Belmonte Jr. of the Liberal Party ran for the House of Representatives in Quezon City's 4th district. The Liberal Party nominated vice mayor Herbert Bautista, who won the election.

| Candidate | Party | Votes | % |
|---|---|---|---|
| Herbert Bautista | Liberal Party | 500,563 | 67.79 |
| Mike Defensor | People's Reform Party | 126,847 | 17.18 |
| Mary Ann Susano | Independent | 68,339 | 9.25 |
| Mel Mathay | Independent | 22,224 | 3.01 |
| Antonio Ariel Inton | Independent | 14,225 | 1.93 |
| John Charles Chang Jr. | Independent | 3,840 | 0.52 |
| Henry Samonte | Independent | 947 | 0.13 |
| Engracio Icasiano | Independent | 867 | 0.12 |
| Roberto Sombillo | Independent | 586 | 0.08 |
| Total | | 738,438 | 100.00 |
| Valid votes | | 738,438 | 95.93 |
| Invalid/blank votes | | 31,339 | 4.07 |
| Total votes | | 769,777 | 100.00 |
| Liberal Party hold | | | |
Source: Commission on Elections

=== Vice Mayor ===
Term-limited incumbent Vice Mayor Herbert Bautista of the Liberal Party ran for Mayor of Quezon City. The Liberal Party nominated Feliciano Belmonte Jr.'s daughter, Joy Belmonte, who won the election.

| Candidate | Party | Votes | % |
|---|---|---|---|
| Joy Belmonte | Liberal Party | 503,657 | 69.98 |
| Aiko Melendez | Pwersa ng Masang Pilipino | 122,584 | 17.03 |
| Janet Malaya | Laban ng Demokratikong Pilipino | 75,302 | 10.46 |
| Dave Planas | Independent | 8,350 | 1.16 |
| Allan Bantilo | Independent | 4,248 | 0.59 |
| Rodrigo Kapunan | Independent | 3,334 | 0.46 |
| Ma. Florliza Pusing | Independent | 851 | 0.12 |
| Rolando Jota | Kilusang Bagong Lipunan | 773 | 0.11 |
| Apolinario Tubera | Independent | 640 | 0.09 |
| Total | | 719,739 | 100.00 |
| Valid votes | | 719,739 | 93.50 |
| Invalid/blank votes | | 50,038 | 6.50 |
| Total votes | | 769,777 | 100.00 |
| Liberal Party hold | | | |
Source: Commission on Elections

=== City Council ===
The Quezon City Council is composed of 26 councilors, 24 of whom are elected.

| Party | Votes | % | Seats |
|---|---|---|---|
| Liberal Party | 1,637,414 | 43.39 | 16 |
| Nationalist People's Coalition | 514,103 | 13.62 | 3 |
| Lakas–Kampi–CMD | 404,588 | 10.72 | 3 |
| Nacionalista Party | 377,056 | 9.99 | 2 |
| Pwersa ng Masang Pilipino | 123,074 | 3.26 | 0 |
| Bagumbayan–VNP | 107,240 | 2.84 | 0 |
| Aksyon Demokratiko | 24,127 | 0.64 | 0 |
| Laban ng Demokratikong Pilipino | 23,058 | 0.61 | 0 |
| Philippine Green Republican Party | 5,981 | 0.16 | 0 |
| Kilusang Bagong Lipunan | 644 | 0.02 | 0 |
| Independent | 556,708 | 14.75 | 0 |
| Total | 3,773,993 | 100.00 | 24 |
| Total votes | 769,777 | – | |
Source: Commission on Elections

==== 1st district ====
| Candidate | Party | Votes | % |
|---|---|---|---|
| Francisco Calalay Jr. | Nacionalista Party | 91,506 | 13.09 |
| Dorothy Delarmente | Nationalist People's Coalition | 75,689 | 10.83 |
| Anthony Peter Crisologo | Nacionalista Party | 71,177 | 10.18 |
| Ricardo Belmonte Jr. | Liberal Party | 69,767 | 9.98 |
| Joseph Emile Juico | Liberal Party | 69,121 | 9.89 |
| Alexis Herrera | Liberal Party | 61,150 | 8.75 |
| Rommel Abesamis | Nationalist People's Coalition | 55,369 | 7.92 |
| Wilma Amoranto-Sarino | Nacionalista Party | 46,927 | 6.71 |
| Raul Medina | Nacionalista Party | 34,679 | 4.96 |
| Fermin Bilaos | Nacionalista Party | 32,442 | 4.64 |
| Arnell Ignacio | Independent | 23,908 | 3.42 |
| Albino Andrew Cheng | Nationalist People's Coalition | 13,721 | 1.96 |
| Ramon Veloso Jr. | Nacionalista Party | 13,206 | 1.89 |
| Flora Santos | Independent | 13,112 | 1.88 |
| Marcelino Vergel de Dios Jr. | Nationalist People's Coalition | 7,508 | 1.07 |
| Mark Dominic Mallari | Independent | 6,749 | 0.97 |
| Nestor Borromeo | Independent | 3,825 | 0.55 |
| Roberto Abat | Independent | 3,301 | 0.47 |
| Reynaldo Aguas | Independent | 2,716 | 0.39 |
| Ramon de Guzman | Independent | 1,848 | 0.26 |
| Fidel Leones | Independent | 1,472 | 0.21 |
| Total | | 699,193 | 100.00 |
| Total votes | | 143,688 | – |
Source: Commission on Elections

==== 2nd district ====
| Candidate | Party | Votes | % |
|---|---|---|---|
| Precious Castelo | Liberal Party | 209,510 | 11.42 |
| Alfred Vargas | Lakas–Kampi–CMD | 202,370 | 11.03 |
| Eden Delilah Medina | Liberal Party | 201,160 | 10.96 |
| Julienne Alyson Rae Medalla | Liberal Party | 180,879 | 9.86 |
| Roderick Paulate | Nationalist People's Coalition | 178,831 | 9.74 |
| Godofredo Liban II | Liberal Party | 138,568 | 7.55 |
| Felicito Valmocina | Bagumbayan–VNP | 107,240 | 5.84 |
| Enrico Serrano | Liberal Party | 64,269 | 3.50 |
| Antonio Sul Francisco Jr. | Pwersa ng Masang Pilipino | 60,027 | 3.27 |
| Ara Mina | Independent | 59,429 | 3.24 |
| Ranulfo Ludovica | Independent | 57,656 | 3.14 |
| Carlito Bernardino | Nacionalista Party | 48,455 | 2.64 |
| Glenda Garcia | Lakas–Kampi–CMD | 47,468 | 2.59 |
| Benjamin Aquino | Independent | 35,845 | 1.95 |
| Reynaldo Miranda Jr. | Independent | 33,064 | 1.80 |
| Reginald Francisco | Independent | 30,216 | 1.65 |
| Sotero Vargas | Independent | 27,008 | 1.47 |
| Jose Arnel Quebal | Pwersa ng Masang Pilipino | 23,344 | 1.27 |
| Gerald Jacob | Nationalist People's Coalition | 18,367 | 1.00 |
| Nicanor John Reyes IV | Nationalist People's Coalition | 13,458 | 0.73 |
| Alfredo Espinola II | Independent | 7,752 | 0.42 |
| Wilfredo Galvez | Independent | 7,263 | 0.40 |
| Cosme Soriano | Pwersa ng Masang Pilipino | 6,697 | 0.36 |
| Honorio Gaviola | Independent | 6,682 | 0.36 |
| Halil Mapandi | Nationalist People's Coalition | 5,821 | 0.32 |
| Alberto dela Cruz Sr. | Independent | 4,753 | 0.26 |
| Joseph Arias | Independent | 4,470 | 0.24 |
| Alexander Arañez | Independent | 4,119 | 0.22 |
| Samuel Rodriguez | Independent | 4,116 | 0.22 |
| Angelito Aldiano | Independent | 4,112 | 0.22 |
| Restituto Perez | Independent | 4,025 | 0.22 |
| Diamond Kalaw | Independent | 3,921 | 0.21 |
| Hermie Bathaluna | Independent | 3,690 | 0.20 |
| Alexander Arciaga | Philippine Green Republican Party | 3,677 | 0.20 |
| Henry Giron | Independent | 3,353 | 0.18 |
| Elvis Vergil Magnaye | Independent | 3,319 | 0.18 |
| Marianito Prieto | Independent | 3,196 | 0.17 |
| Pastor Cayobit | Independent | 3,100 | 0.17 |
| Edison Mijares | Independent | 2,804 | 0.15 |
| Bernard Wilfred Sapitula | Independent | 2,638 | 0.14 |
| Rolando Galura | Independent | 2,626 | 0.14 |
| Esmeraldo Jose Balosa | Independent | 2,541 | 0.14 |
| Domingo Pacis Jr. | Independent | 2,048 | 0.11 |
| Demetrio Sacueza | Independent | 1,240 | 0.07 |
| Total | | 1,835,127 | 100.00 |
| Total votes | | 374,892 | – |
Source: Commission on Elections

==== 3rd district ====
| Candidate | Party | Votes | % |
|---|---|---|---|
| Julian Coseteng | Liberal Party | 42,615 | 8.24 |
| Allan Benedict Reyes | Liberal Party | 40,786 | 7.89 |
| Jaime Borres | Liberal Party | 39,657 | 7.67 |
| Jose Mario Don de Leon | Lakas–Kampi–CMD | 37,308 | 7.22 |
| Gian Sotto | Liberal Party | 34,948 | 6.76 |
| Eufemio Lagumbay | Lakas–Kampi–CMD | 31,106 | 6.02 |
| Arlene de Guzman-Ronquillo | Liberal Party | 29,655 | 5.74 |
| Roberto Nazal Jr. | Lakas–Kampi–CMD | 25,047 | 4.84 |
| James Albert Dichaves | Pwersa ng Masang Pilipino | 23,969 | 4.64 |
| Michael Planas | Laban ng Demokratikong Pilipino | 23,058 | 4.46 |
| Wendy Lim | Nationalist People's Coalition | 22,455 | 4.34 |
| Mario de Guzman | Nationalist People's Coalition | 21,277 | 4.12 |
| John Philip Lesaca | Lakas–Kampi–CMD | 20,911 | 4.04 |
| Beda Torrecampo | Lakas–Kampi–CMD | 19,755 | 3.82 |
| Antonio Joseph Inton | Independent | 16,349 | 3.16 |
| Ogie Diaz | Independent | 14,543 | 2.81 |
| Amadeo Martin Gonzales | Lakas–Kampi–CMD | 13,295 | 2.57 |
| Jaime Fabregas | Independent | 12,777 | 2.47 |
| Raymundo Carlos | Nationalist People's Coalition | 11,910 | 2.30 |
| Juliet Ginete | Independent | 8,921 | 1.73 |
| Elmer Maturan | Independent | 5,870 | 1.14 |
| Concordia Regina Hernandez | Nationalist People's Coalition | 4,002 | 0.77 |
| Gil Modesto | Nationalist People's Coalition | 3,353 | 0.65 |
| Ambrosio Cañete | Independent | 3,130 | 0.61 |
| Rodrigo Escober | Pwersa ng Masang Pilipino | 2,590 | 0.50 |
| Anthony Rebulado | Independent | 2,583 | 0.50 |
| Andy Rosales | Independent | 1,421 | 0.27 |
| Antonio Tamargo | Philippine Green Republican Party | 1,161 | 0.22 |
| Floro Villanueva | Philippine Green Republican Party | 1,143 | 0.22 |
| Emmanuel Cabañez | Independent | 800 | 0.15 |
| Alex Cachila | Independent | 661 | 0.13 |
| Total | | 517,056 | 100.00 |
| Total votes | | 105,534 | – |
Source: Commission on Elections

==== 4th district ====
| Candidate | Party | Votes | % |
|---|---|---|---|
| Edcel Greco Lagman | Liberal Party | 89,242 | 12.35 |
| Bong Suntay | Liberal Party | 88,365 | 12.23 |
| Jessica Daza | Liberal Party | 79,634 | 11.02 |
| Raquel Malangen | Liberal Party | 74,531 | 10.31 |
| Vincent Eric Belmonte Jr. | Liberal Party | 72,326 | 10.01 |
| Marvin Rillo | Nationalist People's Coalition | 54,174 | 7.50 |
| Bayani Hipol | Liberal Party | 51,231 | 7.09 |
| Suzette Bernardo | Independent | 44,720 | 6.19 |
| Edwin Rodriguez | Nacionalista Party | 23,990 | 3.32 |
| Feliciana Ong | Nationalist People's Coalition | 22,113 | 3.06 |
| Jonathan Emmanuel Sison | Independent | 19,217 | 2.66 |
| Larainne Sarmiento | Aksyon Demokratiko | 17,095 | 2.37 |
| Alfredo Garcia | Independent | 14,927 | 2.07 |
| Virgilio Ferrer II | Nacionalista Party | 14,674 | 2.03 |
| Xyrus Lanot | Aksyon Demokratiko | 7,032 | 0.97 |
| Luisito de Guzman | Pwersa ng Masang Pilipino | 6,447 | 0.89 |
| Angela Victoria Sigrid Planas | Independent | 5,250 | 0.73 |
| Ricky Davao | Independent | 5,109 | 0.71 |
| Edgar Delfinado | Nationalist People's Coalition | 4,260 | 0.59 |
| Raquel Bracero | Lakas–Kampi–CMD | 4,205 | 0.58 |
| Edmund Altuna | Independent | 3,737 | 0.52 |
| Pepito Aquino | Independent | 3,513 | 0.49 |
| Regina Celeste San Miguel | Independent | 2,725 | 0.38 |
| Jayson Ocampo | Independent | 1,891 | 0.26 |
| Carl Amadeus Fider | Lakas–Kampi–CMD | 1,817 | 0.25 |
| Teddy Borres | Nationalist People's Coalition | 1,795 | 0.25 |
| Jesus Lipnica Jr. | Independent | 1,716 | 0.24 |
| James Ibañez | Independent | 1,651 | 0.23 |
| Orlando Arellano | Independent | 1,325 | 0.18 |
| Maria Isabel Lopez | Lakas–Kampi–CMD | 1,306 | 0.18 |
| Jerrilyn Cruz | Independent | 1,196 | 0.17 |
| Andres Isabelo Moran | Independent | 759 | 0.11 |
| Gerardo Sabiniano | Kilusang Bagong Lipunan | 644 | 0.09 |
| Total | | 722,617 | 100.00 |
| Total votes | | 145,663 | – |
Source: Commission on Elections

== San Juan ==
=== Mayor ===
Term-limited incumbent Mayor JV Ejercito of Pwersa ng Masang Pilipino ran for the House of Representatives in San Juan's lone district. Ejercito endorsed his mother, Guia Gomez of Partido Magdiwang, who won the election.

| Candidate | Party | Votes | % |
|---|---|---|---|
| Guia Gomez | Partido Magdiwang | 42,119 | 81.80 |
| Alton Glenn Angeles | Ang Kapatiran | 3,840 | 7.46 |
| Manuel Andrada | Lakas–Kampi–CMD | 2,774 | 5.39 |
| Eduardo San Pascual | Independent | 1,600 | 3.11 |
| Chito Aniceto Tamayo | Independent | 1,159 | 2.25 |
| Total | | 51,492 | 100.00 |
| Valid votes | | 51,492 | 88.35 |
| Invalid/blank votes | | 6,792 | 11.65 |
| Total votes | | 58,284 | 100.00 |
| Partido Magdiwang gain from Pwersa ng Masang Pilipino | | | |
Source: Commission on Elections

=== Vice Mayor ===
Term-limited incumbent Vice Mayor Leonardo Celles of Partido Magdiwang ran for the San Juan City Council in the 2nd district. Partido Magdiwang nominated city councilor Francis Zamora, who won the election.

| Candidate | Party | Votes | % |
|---|---|---|---|
| Francis Zamora | Partido Magdiwang | 45,282 | 91.78 |
| Alexander Enriquez | Lakas–Kampi–CMD | 4,055 | 8.22 |
| Total | | 49,337 | 100.00 |
| Valid votes | | 49,337 | 84.65 |
| Invalid/blank votes | | 8,947 | 15.35 |
| Total votes | | 58,284 | 100.00 |
| Partido Magdiwang hold | | | |
Source: Commission on Elections

=== City Council ===
The San Juan City Council is composed of 14 councilors, 12 of whom are elected.

| Party | Votes | % | Seats |
|---|---|---|---|
| Partido Magdiwang | 190,424 | 73.20 | 11 |
| Lakas–Kampi–CMD | 22,131 | 8.51 | 0 |
| Bangon Pilipinas | 13,435 | 5.16 | 1 |
| Nationalist People's Coalition | 13,207 | 5.08 | 0 |
| Independent | 20,938 | 8.05 | 0 |
| Total | 260,135 | 100.00 | 12 |
| Total votes | 58,284 | – | |
Source: Commission on Elections

==== 1st district ====
| Candidate | Party | Votes | % |
|---|---|---|---|
| Vincent Pacheco | Partido Magdiwang | 20,139 | 15.85 |
| Ferdinand Velasco | Partido Magdiwang | 16,176 | 12.73 |
| Angelo Agcaoili | Partido Magdiwang | 15,449 | 12.16 |
| Edgardo Soriano | Partido Magdiwang | 15,313 | 12.05 |
| William Go | Partido Magdiwang | 14,812 | 11.66 |
| Marie O'Neal Mendoza | Partido Magdiwang | 13,907 | 10.95 |
| Emiliano Pillarina | Independent | 11,537 | 9.08 |
| Anthony Joseph dela Cruz | Independent | 9,401 | 7.40 |
| Bernard Drilon | Lakas–Kampi–CMD | 3,788 | 2.98 |
| Garry Reyes | Lakas–Kampi–CMD | 2,414 | 1.90 |
| Johnny Young | Lakas–Kampi–CMD | 1,883 | 1.48 |
| Joseph Galarosa | Lakas–Kampi–CMD | 1,246 | 0.98 |
| Jeremy Tayson | Lakas–Kampi–CMD | 964 | 0.76 |
| Total | | 127,029 | 100.00 |
| Total votes | | 28,420 | – |
Source: Commission on Elections

==== 2nd district ====
| Candidate | Party | Votes | % |
|---|---|---|---|
| Jannah Ejercito | Partido Magdiwang | 19,706 | 14.80 |
| Rolando Bernardo | Partido Magdiwang | 16,957 | 12.74 |
| Richard Peralta | Partido Magdiwang | 15,622 | 11.74 |
| Andoni Miguel Carballo | Partido Magdiwang | 15,598 | 11.72 |
| Leonardo Celles | Partido Magdiwang | 14,630 | 10.99 |
| Jose Warren Villa | Bangon Pilipinas | 13,435 | 10.09 |
| Jose Noel Rozon | Partido Magdiwang | 12,115 | 9.10 |
| Carlos Yam | Nationalist People's Coalition | 11,110 | 8.35 |
| James Lim | Lakas–Kampi–CMD | 3,019 | 2.27 |
| Glenn Acol | Nationalist People's Coalition | 2,097 | 1.58 |
| Joanna Torre | Lakas–Kampi–CMD | 1,886 | 1.42 |
| Lani Duran | Lakas–Kampi–CMD | 1,854 | 1.39 |
| Diosdedith Torres | Lakas–Kampi–CMD | 1,498 | 1.13 |
| Justin Angelo Jhocson | Lakas–Kampi–CMD | 1,385 | 1.04 |
| Amador Turla | Lakas–Kampi–CMD | 1,133 | 0.85 |
| Belinda Surian | Lakas–Kampi–CMD | 1,061 | 0.80 |
| Total | | 133,106 | 100.00 |
| Total votes | | 29,864 | – |
Source: Commission on Elections

== Taguig ==
=== Mayor ===
Term-limited incumbent Mayor Sigfrido Tiñga of the Liberal Party ran for the House of Representatives in Taguig's lone district. Tiñga endorsed his father, former Supreme Court associate justice Dante Tiñga of Kilusang Diwa ng Taguig, who was defeated by representative Lani Cayetano of the Nacionalista Party.

| Candidate | Party | Votes | % |
|---|---|---|---|
| Lani Cayetano | Nacionalista Party | 95,865 | 50.53 |
| Dante Tiñga | Kilusang Diwa ng Taguig | 93,445 | 49.25 |
| Arthur Clavo | Democratic Party of the Philippines | 214 | 0.11 |
| John Rarang | Independent | 205 | 0.11 |
| Total | | 189,729 | 100.00 |
| Valid votes | | 189,729 | 97.05 |
| Invalid/blank votes | | 5,773 | 2.95 |
| Total votes | | 195,502 | 100.00 |
| Nacionalista Party gain from Liberal Party | | | |
Source: Commission on Elections

=== Vice Mayor ===
Incumbent Vice Mayor George Elias of Kilusang Diwa ng Taguig won re-election to a third term.

| Candidate | Party | Votes | % |
|---|---|---|---|
| George Elias | Kilusang Diwa ng Taguig | 110,137 | 62.91 |
| Ferdinand Santos | Nacionalista Party | 51,564 | 29.45 |
| Jeffrey Lontoc | Pwersa ng Masang Pilipino | 12,366 | 7.06 |
| Cirila Lumontod | Independent | 996 | 0.57 |
| Total | | 175,063 | 100.00 |
| Valid votes | | 175,063 | 89.55 |
| Invalid/blank votes | | 20,439 | 10.45 |
| Total votes | | 195,502 | 100.00 |
| Kilusang Diwa ng Taguig hold | | | |
Source: Commission on Elections

=== City Council ===
The Taguig City Council is composed of 18 councilors, 16 of whom are elected.

| Party | Votes | % | Seats |
|---|---|---|---|
| Nacionalista Party | 374,143 | 29.00 | 0 |
| Kilusang Diwa ng Taguig | 327,144 | 25.36 | 7 |
| Liberal Party | 282,567 | 21.90 | 6 |
| Nationalist People's Coalition | 133,480 | 10.35 | 3 |
| Lingkod Taguig | 44,468 | 3.45 | 0 |
| Pwersa ng Masang Pilipino | 30,609 | 2.37 | 0 |
| People's Reform Party | 20,662 | 1.60 | 0 |
| Bangon Pilipinas | 14,371 | 1.11 | 0 |
| Independent | 62,691 | 4.86 | 0 |
| Total | 1,290,135 | 100.00 | 16 |
| Total votes | 195,502 | – | |
Source: Commission on Elections

==== 1st district ====
| Candidate | Party | Votes | % |
|---|---|---|---|
| Ronnette Franco | Nationalist People's Coalition | 44,325 | 7.56 |
| Gamaliel San Pedro | Liberal Party | 43,381 | 7.39 |
| Roderick Carlos Papa | Liberal Party | 43,342 | 7.39 |
| Baltazar Mariategue | Nationalist People's Coalition | 41,931 | 7.15 |
| Jaime Labampa | Kilusang Diwa ng Taguig | 41,645 | 7.10 |
| Baby Gloria de Mesa | Kilusang Diwa ng Taguig | 40,414 | 6.89 |
| Rodil Marcelino | Liberal Party | 39,164 | 6.68 |
| Carlito Ogalinola | Kilusang Diwa ng Taguig | 36,836 | 6.28 |
| Ading Cruz | Nacionalista Party | 35,362 | 6.03 |
| Emmanuel Victoria Jr. | Nacionalista Party | 33,573 | 5.72 |
| Darwin Icay | Nacionalista Party | 33,277 | 5.67 |
| Eduardo Cruz | Nacionalista Party | 30,717 | 5.24 |
| Aurelio Padilla | Nacionalista Party | 27,918 | 4.76 |
| Jinky Sarmiento | Nacionalista Party | 26,446 | 4.51 |
| Henry Vega | Nacionalista Party | 25,138 | 4.29 |
| Generoso Ignacio | Nacionalista Party | 20,754 | 3.54 |
| Robel dela Paz | Independent | 9,576 | 1.63 |
| Alberto Villanueva | Pwersa ng Masang Pilipino | 5,455 | 0.93 |
| Gerry Placeros | Pwersa ng Masang Pilipino | 4,922 | 0.84 |
| Joepeter Hidalgo | Independent | 2,464 | 0.42 |
| Total | | 586,640 | 100.00 |
| Total votes | | 88,635 | – |
Source: Commission on Elections

==== 2nd district ====
| Candidate | Party | Votes | % |
|---|---|---|---|
| Aurelio Paulo Bartolome | Liberal Party | 57,552 | 8.18 |
| Milagros Valencia | Kilusang Diwa ng Taguig | 54,459 | 7.74 |
| Estela Gasgonia | Liberal Party | 52,989 | 7.53 |
| Ricardo Jordan | Kilusang Diwa ng Taguig | 52,041 | 7.40 |
| Michelle Anne Gonzales | Kilusang Diwa ng Taguig | 50,816 | 7.22 |
| Erwin Manalili | Nationalist People's Coalition | 47,224 | 6.71 |
| Jeffrey Morales | Liberal Party | 46,139 | 6.56 |
| Edwin Eron | Kilusang Diwa ng Taguig | 39,159 | 5.57 |
| Noel Dizon | Nacionalista Party | 28,016 | 3.98 |
| Janine Bustos | Nacionalista Party | 27,200 | 3.87 |
| Hareem Pautin | Nacionalista Party | 24,156 | 3.43 |
| Queen Dolly Carreon | Nacionalista Party | 23,901 | 3.40 |
| Marc Reyes | Lingkod Taguig | 23,149 | 3.29 |
| Margaret Jean Defensor-Manalaysay | People's Reform Party | 20,662 | 2.94 |
| Wilfredo Dubria | Nacionalista Party | 18,464 | 2.62 |
| Leo Aguilar | Pwersa ng Masang Pilipino | 15,426 | 2.19 |
| Lhorelyn Fortuno | Lingkod Taguig | 15,389 | 2.19 |
| Eric Walter Salonga | Independent | 14,886 | 2.12 |
| Vilma Antigo | Bangon Pilipinas | 14,371 | 2.04 |
| Eugenio Sonny Calapit | Independent | 13,918 | 1.98 |
| Guido Malco | Nacionalista Party | 13,620 | 1.94 |
| Maricar Delfin-Villa | Kilusang Diwa ng Taguig | 11,774 | 1.67 |
| Princess Jacel Ramos | Independent | 10,232 | 1.45 |
| Celerino Morada | Lingkod Taguig | 5,930 | 0.84 |
| Ruth Anne Fronda | Nacionalista Party | 5,601 | 0.80 |
| Ahiyal Sappayani | Pwersa ng Masang Pilipino | 4,806 | 0.68 |
| Hernando Mendoza | Independent | 4,648 | 0.66 |
| Taharudin Mokalid | Independent | 3,533 | 0.50 |
| Reynaldo Acas | Independent | 3,434 | 0.49 |
| Total | | 703,495 | 100.00 |
| Total votes | | 106,867 | – |
Source: Commission on Elections

== Valenzuela ==
=== Mayor ===
Incumbent Mayor Sherwin Gatchalian of the Nationalist People's Coalition won re-election to a third term.

| Candidate | Party | Votes | % |
|---|---|---|---|
| Sherwin Gatchalian | Nationalist People's Coalition | 162,999 | 88.15 |
| Manuel Carreon | Lakas–Kampi–CMD | 13,920 | 7.53 |
| Pablo Hernandez III | Independent | 8,002 | 4.33 |
| Total | | 184,921 | 100.00 |
| Valid votes | | 184,921 | 93.35 |
| Invalid/blank votes | | 13,180 | 6.65 |
| Total votes | | 198,101 | 100.00 |
| Nationalist People's Coalition hold | | | |
Source: Commission on Elections

=== Vice Mayor ===
Incumbent Vice Mayor Eric Martinez of the Liberal Party won re-election to a second term.

| Candidate | Party | Votes | % |
|---|---|---|---|
| Eric Martinez | Liberal Party | 83,279 | 44.93 |
| Marcelino Morelos | Lakas–Kampi–CMD | 66,911 | 36.10 |
| Ignacio Santiago Jr. | Nacionalista Party | 35,177 | 18.98 |
| Total | | 185,367 | 100.00 |
| Valid votes | | 185,367 | 93.57 |
| Invalid/blank votes | | 12,734 | 6.43 |
| Total votes | | 198,101 | 100.00 |
| Liberal Party hold | | | |
Source: Commission on Elections

=== City Council ===
The Valenzuela City Council is composed of 14 councilors, 12 of whom are elected.

| Party | Votes | % | Seats |
|---|---|---|---|
| Lakas–Kampi–CMD | 329,566 | 32.97 | 2 |
| Nationalist People's Coalition | 308,608 | 30.87 | 5 |
| Nacionalista Party | 221,215 | 22.13 | 3 |
| Liberal Party | 136,817 | 13.69 | 2 |
| Independent | 3,496 | 0.35 | 0 |
| Total | 999,702 | 100.00 | 12 |
| Total votes | 198,101 | – | |
Source: Commission on Elections

==== 1st district ====
| Candidate | Party | Votes | % |
|---|---|---|---|
| Ritchie Cuadra | Liberal Party | 57,259 | 12.91 |
| Katherine Pineda | Lakas–Kampi–CMD | 52,985 | 11.94 |
| Antonio Espiritu | Nationalist People's Coalition | 52,139 | 11.75 |
| Gerry Esplana | Nationalist People's Coalition | 47,831 | 10.78 |
| Corazon Cortez | Nationalist People's Coalition | 47,214 | 10.64 |
| Marlon Paulo Alejandrino | Nationalist People's Coalition | 44,598 | 10.05 |
| Emmanuel Delesmo | Nationalist People's Coalition | 38,083 | 8.58 |
| Meilene Dizor | Lakas–Kampi–CMD | 27,870 | 6.28 |
| Joel Angeles | Nationalist People's Coalition | 24,501 | 5.52 |
| Buenaventura Sanguyo III | Lakas–Kampi–CMD | 21,521 | 4.85 |
| Ernesto Trinidad | Lakas–Kampi–CMD | 17,009 | 3.83 |
| Joel Co | Lakas–Kampi–CMD | 12,599 | 2.84 |
| Total | | 443,609 | 100.00 |
| Total votes | | 89,208 | – |
Source: Commission on Elections

==== 2nd district ====
| Candidate | Party | Votes | % |
|---|---|---|---|
| Shalani Soledad | Liberal Party | 79,558 | 14.31 |
| Kate Abigael Galang-Coseteng | Nacionalista Party | 74,811 | 13.45 |
| Maria Cecilia Mayo | Lakas–Kampi–CMD | 56,677 | 10.19 |
| Lailanie Nolasco | Nationalist People's Coalition | 54,242 | 9.75 |
| Lorie Natividad-Borja | Nacionalista Party | 52,218 | 9.39 |
| Adrian Dapat | Nacionalista Party | 51,412 | 9.25 |
| Fernando Padrinao | Nacionalista Party | 42,774 | 7.69 |
| Kristian Rome Sy | Lakas–Kampi–CMD | 39,695 | 7.14 |
| Moises Beltran | Lakas–Kampi–CMD | 30,107 | 5.41 |
| Jasmin Antonio | Lakas–Kampi–CMD | 27,376 | 4.92 |
| Mary Ann Manalaysay | Lakas–Kampi–CMD | 24,595 | 4.42 |
| Johnny Tan | Lakas–Kampi–CMD | 19,132 | 3.44 |
| Robert Cruz | Independent | 3,496 | 0.63 |
| Total | | 556,093 | 100.00 |
| Total votes | | 108,893 | – |
Source: Commission on Elections
