= Xyza Diazen =

Filipina politician and former city councilor of Marikina

Xyza Diazen-Santos

Member of the Marikina City Council for the 2nd District
- In office June 30, 2010 – June 30, 2019

Personal details
- Born: May 3, 1986 (age 40) Marikina, Philippines
- Party: Aksyon (2021–present)
- Other political affiliations: Liberal (2009–2021)
- Spouse: Juan Carlo Senga Santos
- Education: National Teachers College (2002–2007), Roosevelt College (2011–2012)
- Profession: Teacher, Politician

Xyza R. Diazen-Santos (born May 3, 1986) is a Filipino politician and teacher who served as a member of the Marikina City Council for Marikina's second district from 2010 to 2019.

== Early life ==
Diazen was born on May 3, 1986, in Marikina. She is the daughter of Rogelio and Evelyn Diazen. After graduating from Parang High School, Diazen was elected as one of the Sangguniang Kabataan (SK) councilors of Marikina in the 2002 elections. While serving as SK councilor, she took up a degree in secondary education at the National Teachers College, wherein she was a MAPEH department officer and a dance troupe member.

== Parang Barangay Council (2007–2010) ==
In the 2007 elections, Diazen was elected as one of the Barangay councilors of Parang, Marikina. She served as Chairman of the Committee on Barangay Affairs and Committee on Education.

== Marikina City Council (2010–2019) ==
=== Elections ===
In 2010, Diazen ran for a seat in the Marikina City Council for its second district. She was elected to the post with the second-highest number of votes. With Diazen being sworn in as city councilor on June 30, 2010, aged 24, she became one of the most youngest councilors in the city's history. Diazen was re-elected as to her seat in 2013 and 2016. She was term-limited by 2019.

=== Tenure ===
As city councilor, Diazen was a member of ten committees in the Marikina city council, namely: Tourism, Culture and Arts, Disaster Preparedness, Mitigation and Management (both as chairman), Appropriations, Cooperatives, Communications and Information Technology, Environmental Protection, Parks Development, People's Participation, Ways and Means, and Women's and Family Affairs. She passed five ordinances and 21 resolutions with one of the more significant ordinances she introduced was about the implementation of a Marikina City Disaster Reduction and Management Plan, and the creation of Barangay Disaster Risk Reduction and Management Committees. In February 2012, she was one of the members of the Philippine delegation sent by the country in accordance to strengthening political exchanges between the Philippines and Australia.

== 2022 Marikina local election ==
In 2022, Diazen sought a return to the City Council as a councilor for the second district under the Aksyon Demokratiko party in a coalition led by Del de Guzman. She would later be defeated in the race, placing twelfth out of twenty-seven candidates.

== Electoral history ==
Year	Office	Party	Votes for Diazen				Result
Year	Office	Party	Total	%	P.	Swing	Result
2010	Councilor	Liberal	35,499	6.50%	2nd	N/A	Won
2013	Councilor	Liberal	42,463	8.90%	2nd	+2.40%	Won
2016	Councilor	Liberal	49,562	7.45%	3rd	-1.45%	Won
2022	Councilor	Aksyon	27,611	3.37%	12th	-4.08%	Lost
