= Lopez Heritage House =

Heritage house in Iloilo City, Philippines

Coordinates: 10°43′07″N 122°33′44″E

- Mansión de López
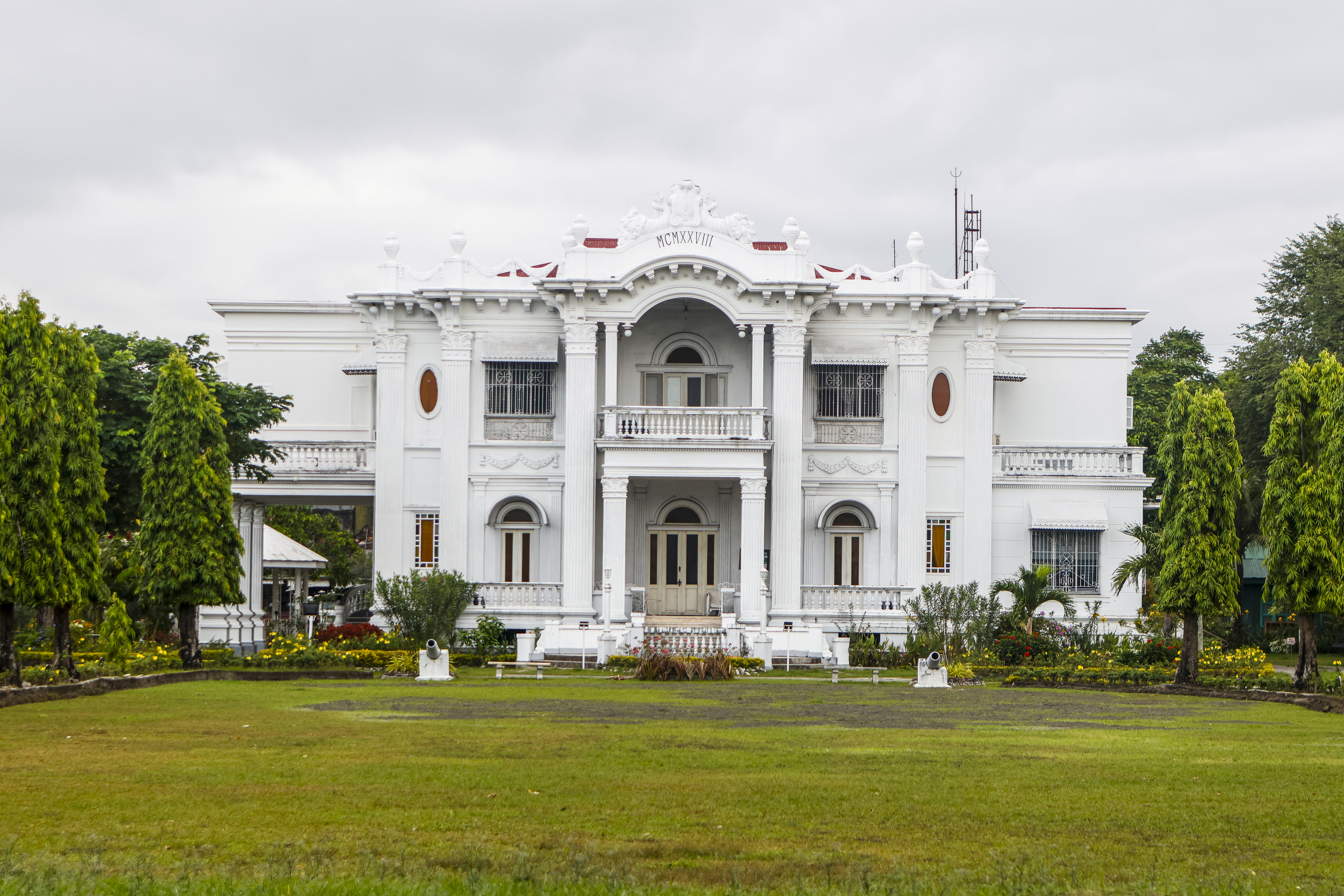
- Alternative names: Lopez Mansion; Nelly Garden

General information
- Architectural style: Beaux-Arts
- Location: Jaro, E Lopez Street, Jaro, Iloilo City, Iloilo, Philippines, Iloilo City, Philippines
- Completed: 1928
- Owner: López family of Iloilo

Technical details
- Floor count: 2

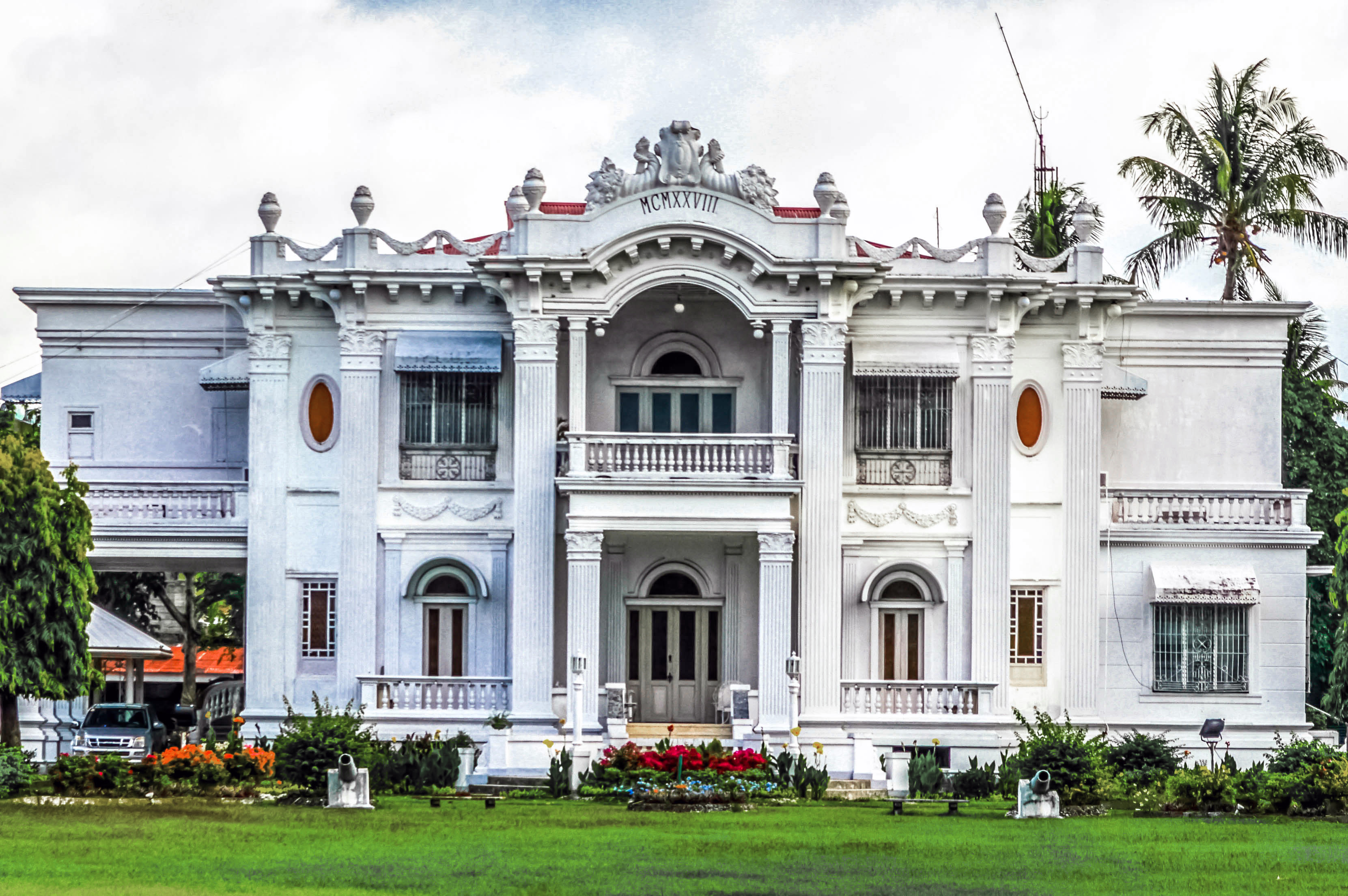
Closeup of the mansion

The Lopez Heritage House, also known as Mansion de Lopez or Lopez Mansion (or otherwise known as the Nelly Garden), is a heritage house in Jaro, Iloilo City, Philippines. It was built in 1928 by Ilonggo statesman Don Vicente López and his wife, Doña Elena Hofileña, among the early members of the prominent López family of Iloilo. The mansion was named after the couple's eldest daughter, Nelly López y Hofileña. Due to its grandiose architecture highlighting the province's aristocratic past, it is regarded as the "Queen of Heritage Houses in Iloilo". The house and its 4 hectares (9.9 acres) property are open for public tours and events.

== History ==
Don Vicente López y Villanueva, a prominent figure in the wealthy López family, was a successful sugar planter and industrialist in Iloilo. He used to live near the Jaro Cathedral with his wife, Elena Hofileña, but the constant sound of the cannons fired during religious activities during those times eventually led to the family's decision to transfer their home to a more peaceful location. They eventually settled approximately one kilometer from the town center. The construction of the mansion was finished by 1928, and the couple decided to name the house after their eldest daughter, Nelly. Following the assassination of his elder brother and Iloilo governor, Don Benito López y Villanueva, in 1908 by a rival political faction and relatives, Jalandoni clan, Don Vicente took guardianship of his nephews, Eugenio “Eñing” and Fernando “Nanding” (later known as tycoon Don Eugenio Lopez and Vice-President Fernando Lopez, also co-founders of ABS-CBN Corporation).

During the World War II in the Philippines, the mansion was very nearly burned down to the ground by Filipino guerrillas commandeered by an Ilonggo general to raze every mansion in the province to prevent them from serving as the headquarters for the invading Japanese soldiers. The-then occupants Lilia Lopez-Jison (3rd child of Don Vicente and Doña Elena) and her husband begged the guerillas to spare the house. Just as kerosene was poured around the place, a squad of Japanese soldiers came and a heavy gunfight ensued. By the end of the war, the house survived in one piece.

In its lifetime, the house served as a venue for receptions and meetings with Governor-Generals of the Philippines including Frank Murphy and Teddy Roosevelt Jr., Thailand's Prince Chupra, Former First Lady Imelda Marcos and late president Cory Aquino.

Due to its cultural and architectural prominence, the National Historical Institute placed a historical marker on it, declaring it to be a National Heritage House on March 28, 2004.

== Architecture ==
The house is in Beaux-Arts style influenced by Western aesthetics. evident on its façade. It is designed to portray the extravagant lifestyle of Iloilo's most affluent families during the American colonial era in the Philippines. Profusely adorned with ornately carved columns and pilasters, the house is constructed to look imposing outside just as it does inside. Two set of wooden stairs lead to the family cavernous common room where most of the furniture and paintings are placed. Even the poster beds in its rooms at the second floor are carefully preserved for public viewing. High up in the ceiling are crystal chandeliers that give off a soft, warm glow, illuminated the wooden brandishing that serves as an elaborate divider to each room.

In the centerpiece of the dining room is a hexagonal table which can sit up to twenty-four guests. A huge chandelier hangs from the ceiling which is fifteen-feet high. The door-length windows allows the light to get inside the room, creating a bright atmosphere as the guests dine together.

== See also ==
- Lopez Boat House
- Casa Mariquit
