= Lopez Boat House =

Heritage house in Iloilo City, Philippines

Coordinates: 10°42′43″N 122°33′55″E

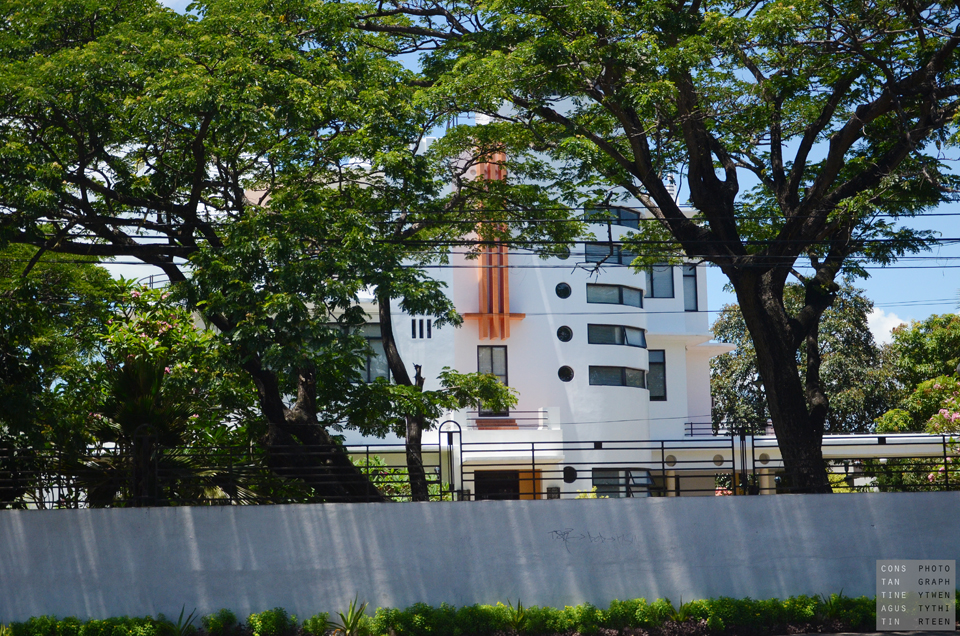
- Interactive map of the Lopez Boat House area
- Alternative names: Lopez Ancestral House; Eugenio Lopez Ancestral House

General information
- Architectural style: Art Deco / Streamline Moderne
- Location: Luna Street, La Paz, Iloilo City, Philippines
- Completed: 1935
- Owner: López family of Iloilo

Technical details
- Floor count: 4

Design and construction
- Architect: Fernando Ocampo

The Lopez Ancestral House, also known as the Lopez Boat House or Eugenio Lopez Ancestral House, is an ancestral house located in La Paz, Iloilo City, Philippines.

== History ==
The house was owned by the López family of Iloilo, it was the former residence of Eugenio López Sr., the co-founder of ABS-CBN Corporation, and the brother of Fernando Lopez Sr., who served as Vice President of the Philippines. The house, built in 1935, was declared a National Heritage House by the National Historical Commission on March 13, 2002.

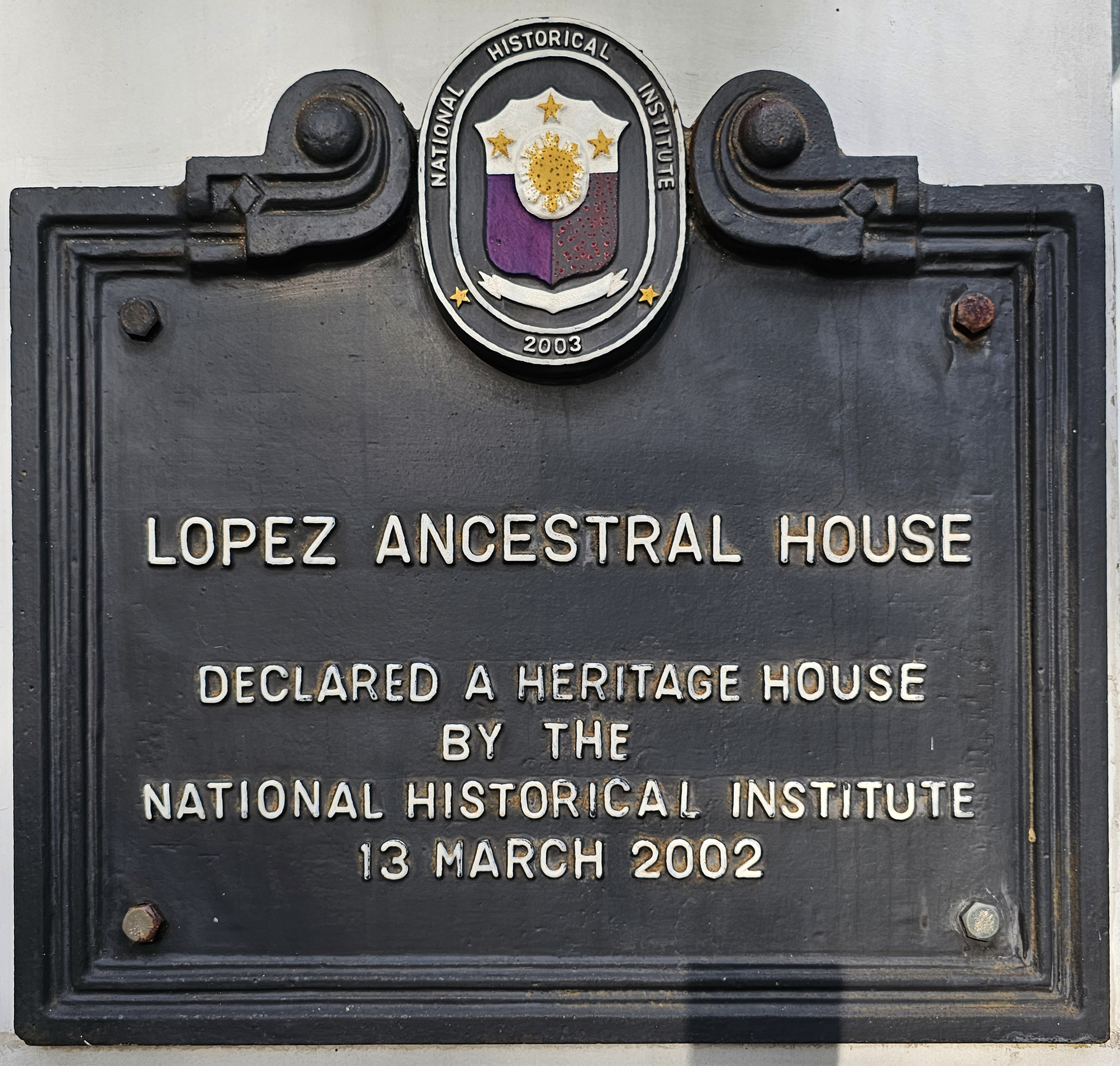
Lopez Ancestral House, declared a Heritage House by the National Historical Institute in March 13, 2002

The house is referred to as the "Boat House" due to its distinctive features resembling those of a boat. According to Oscar Lopez, one of the heirs and son of Eugenio, the design of the house evokes the appearance of a battleship, complete with portholes. The long veranda of the house is likened to a boat's viewing deck, while the tower extends up to a fourth-floor observation area.

From 1992 to 1997, the Boat House was leased by the PAREF Westbridge School for boys.

== See also ==
- Lopez Heritage House
- Casa Mariquit
