= Eugenio Lopez III =

Filipino-American businessman

Eugenio "Gabby" Lopez III
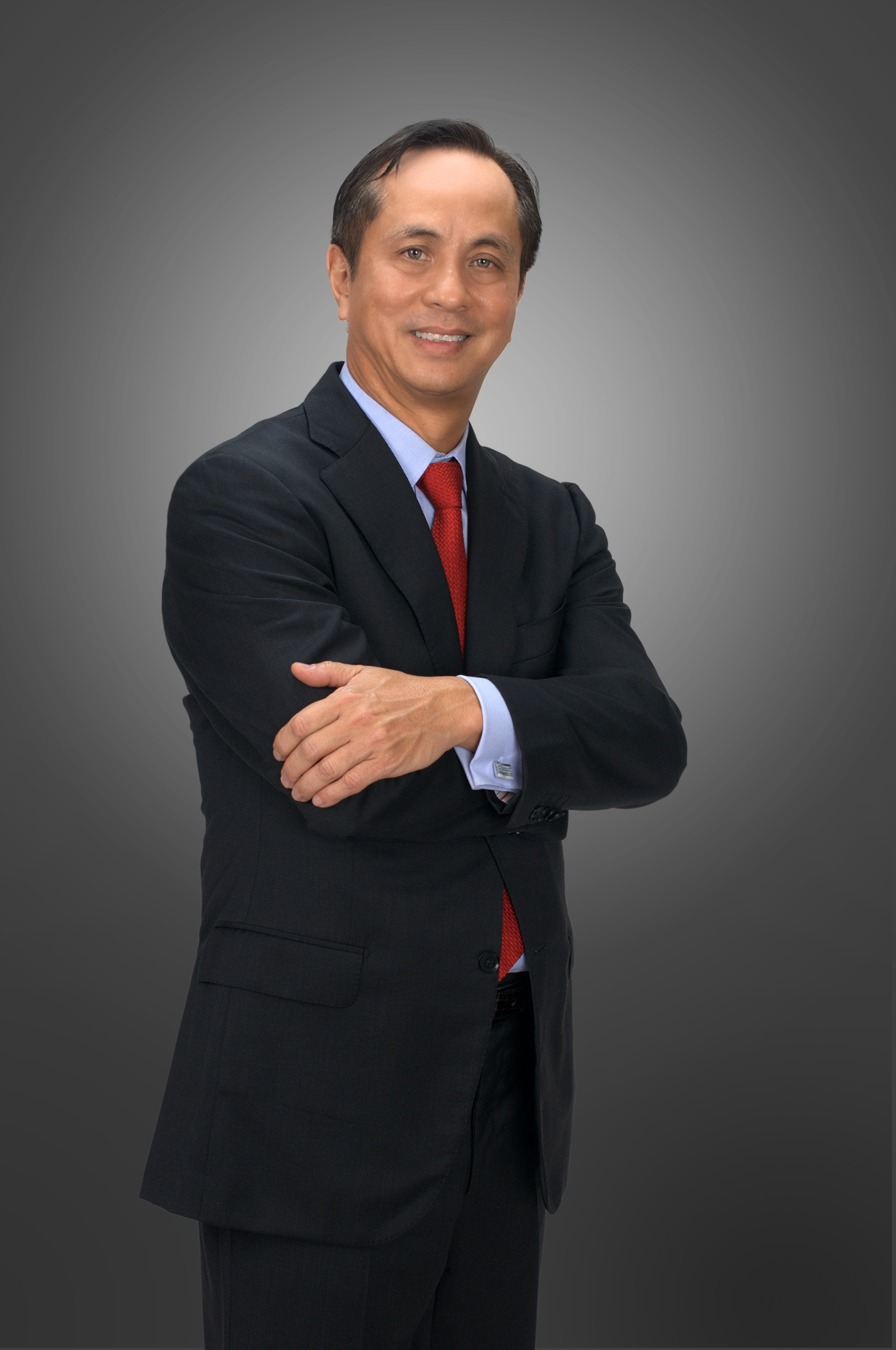

Chairman, ABS-CBN (Broadcasting) Corporation
- In office May 26, 1997 – April 18, 2018
- Preceded by: Eugenio Lopez Jr.
- Succeeded by: Mark Lopez

President, ABS-CBN Broadcasting Corporation
- Interim
- In office March 16, 2006 – March 3, 2008
- Preceded by: Luis F. Alejandro
- Succeeded by: Charo Santos-Concio
- In office May 26, 1993 – May 26, 1997
- Preceded by: Eugenio Lopez Jr.
- Succeeded by: Freddie M. Garcia

Personal details
- Born: Eugenio Gabriel Lopez III (Note: Eugenio Lopez III was born in the United States of America. Thus, he does not possess his mother's maiden name which is La'O.); August 13, 1952 (age 74) Boston, Massachusetts, U.S.
- Citizenship: Philippines; United States
- Spouses: Babsie Chuidian; Panjee Gonzales
- Children: 4
- Parents: Eugenio Lopez Jr.; Conchita La'O
- Relatives: Lopez family
- Education: Bowdoin College (BA); Harvard University (MBA)
- Occupation: Business executive
- Known for: Former chairman and president of ABS-CBN Corporation

Eugenio Gabriel "Gabby" Lopez III (Tagalog: [juˈhɛnjo ˈlɔpɛs]; born August 13, 1952) is a Filipino-American businessman who was the CEO (1993–2013), chairman (1997–2018) and chairman emeritus (2018–2020) of the Filipino media company ABS-CBN Corporation.

== Early life and education ==
Eugenio Gabriel Lopez III was born on August 13, 1952, in Boston, Massachusetts, to Eugenio "Geny" Lopez Jr. and Conchita "Chita" La'O.

He is a member of the prominent López family of Iloilo; his father was one of the pioneers of the Philippine television industry. His mother was one of the daughters of the wealthy La'O family of Manila, whose other daughter married into the city's old Manotoc clan (making her an aunt of Tommy Manotoc, a former basketball coach, golfer and former husband of Imee Marcos, the eldest daughter of President Ferdinand Marcos). Another La'O daughter married former Senator Raul Manglapus.

Lopez holds a Bachelor of Arts in political science from Bowdoin College in Brunswick, Maine (1970–1974), and a Master of Business Administration from Harvard Business School in Cambridge, Massachusetts (1978–1980).

== Career ==
Lopez became the chairman in 1997 and chief executive officer in 1993 of ABS-CBN Corporation. He was interim president of the company from 1993 to 1997, and again 2006 to 2008.

ABS-CBN has enjoyed network supremacy since its founding in 1953, apart from the years 1972 to 1986, when the company and all of its affiliates were forcibly taken over by the Marcos government. During this period and following his education, Lopez was employed at the Crocker National Bank where he served as assistant vice president in the bank's back-office processing area. He had an undistinguished banking career in the United States while waiting for work in his family's media and utility interests in the Philippines.

When control of the company was restored by the Aquino administration in 1986, Lopez started with ABS-CBN as director of finance. He was appointed general manager a year later.

Under his leadership, ABS-CBN enjoyed steady growth, while aggressively pursuing diversification. These include interactive media, sound recording, post-production, international cable and satellite distribution, sports programming and licensing and merchandising.

He created the Lopez Communications Group (CommGroup) in 1997. CommGroup is the management committee that oversees the development and implementation of convergence strategies for ABS-CBN, BayanTel, Sky Cable, and the Lopez Group's investments in telecommunications and cable telephony and data warehousing across the three companies. He is also the chairman and chief executive officer of CommGroup.

In 2012, he retired as CEO of ABS-CBN and was succeeded by the ABS-CBN president Charo Santos-Concio. He stepped down as chairman of the conglomerate six years later, being elected as chairman emeritus on April 18, 2018. His cousin, Martin "Mark" L. López, who served as the company's chief technology officer, was elected as the new chairman of the board.

On September 24, 2020, ABS-CBN released a press statement announcing his resignation as chairman emeritus and director of ABS-CBN and as director of ABS-CBN Holdings Corporation, Sky Vision Corporation, Sky Cable Corporation, First Philippine Holdings Corporation, First Gen Corporation, and Rockwell Land Corporation.

== Personal life ==
He has 4 children.

=== Dual citizenship ===
Lopez' citizenship was put into question as part of the renewal process of ABS-CBN Corporation's broadcast franchise. It was alleged that Lopez solely held American citizenship, violating the 1987 Constitution's provision that media companies should be fully Filipino-owned, and that he supposedly gained Filipino citizenship when he applied for recognition as a Filipino national in 2001.

The Philippine Department of Justice ruled that López is a natural-born Filipino since the 1935 Constitution automatically conferred him Filipino citizenship as both of his parents were Filipino while also having American citizenship due to the United States' jus soli nationality law. His usage of a United States passport was also ruled irrelevant to his Filipino citizenship.

== Recognitions ==
- 2014 Tanglaw ng Araw Award, 9th Araw Values Awards
- 2014 Lifetime Achievement Award, 22nd Kapisanan ng mga Brodkaster ng Pilipinas (KBP) Golden Dove Awards

== In popular culture ==
López was portrayed by Mark Anthony Fernandez in the 1995 film Eskapo.

== Notes ==
Preceded by Eugenio M. Lopez Jr.	ABS-CBN Chairman-Emeritus; April 18, 2018 – September 24, 2020	Succeeded by Vacant
Preceded by Eugenio M. Lopez Jr.	ABS-CBN Chairman; May 26, 1997 – April 18, 2018	Succeeded by Mark L. Lopez
Preceded by Eugenio M. Lopez Jr.	ABS-CBN President/CEO; May 26, 1993 – May 26, 1997	Succeeded by Federico M. Garcia
Preceded by Luis F. Alejandro	ABS-CBN President (interim); March 16, 2006 – March 3, 2008	Succeeded by Charo Santos-Concio
Preceded by Regina Paz L. Lopez	ABS-CBN Lingkod Kapamilya Chairperson; June 30, 2016 – May 3, 2017	Succeeded by Regina Paz L. Lopez
