= Benpres =

Benpres may refer to:

- Lopez Holdings Corporation (formerly Benpres Holdings), a Filipino multinational conglomerate
  - Benpres Building, a demolished six-story Filipino modernist heritage building in which Lopez Holdings was headquartered
