= List of vice presidents of the Philippines by time in office =

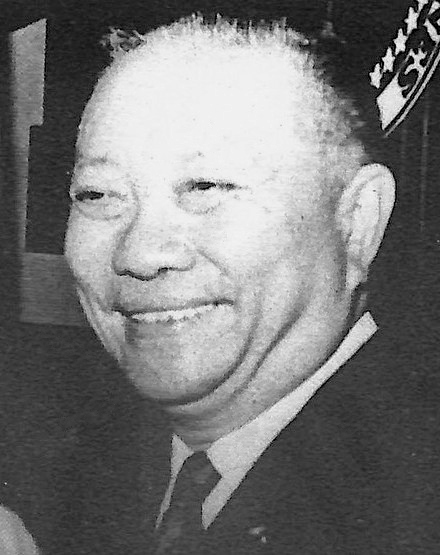
Fernando Lopez is the longest-serving vice president, totalling 11 years, 18 days (4,036 days) over the course of his two tenures from 1949 to 1953 and 1965 to 1973.

This is a list of the current and former vice presidents of the Philippines by time in office consisting of the 14 (Note: Fernando Lopez served two nonconsecutive terms, according to the amended 1935 Constitution: one full four-year term (1949 to 1935) under Elpidio Quirino; and one full (1965 to 1969) and one partial (1969 to 1973) term under Ferdinand Marcos. He is regarded as both the third and seventh vice president of the Philippines.) vice presidents in the history of the Philippines. The basis for this list is counted by the number of calendar days.

== Rank by time in office ==
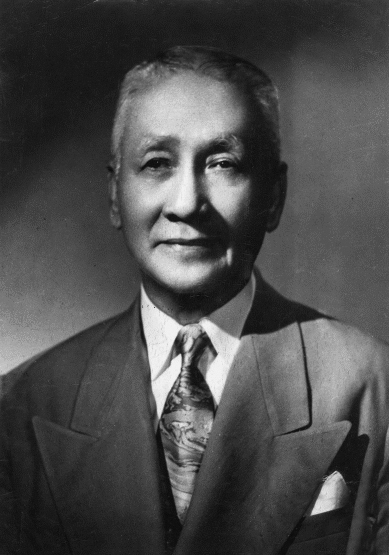
Sergio Osmeña is the longest-serving vice president in a single tenure, serving for 8 years, 260 days (3,182 days) before succeeding to the Presidency.

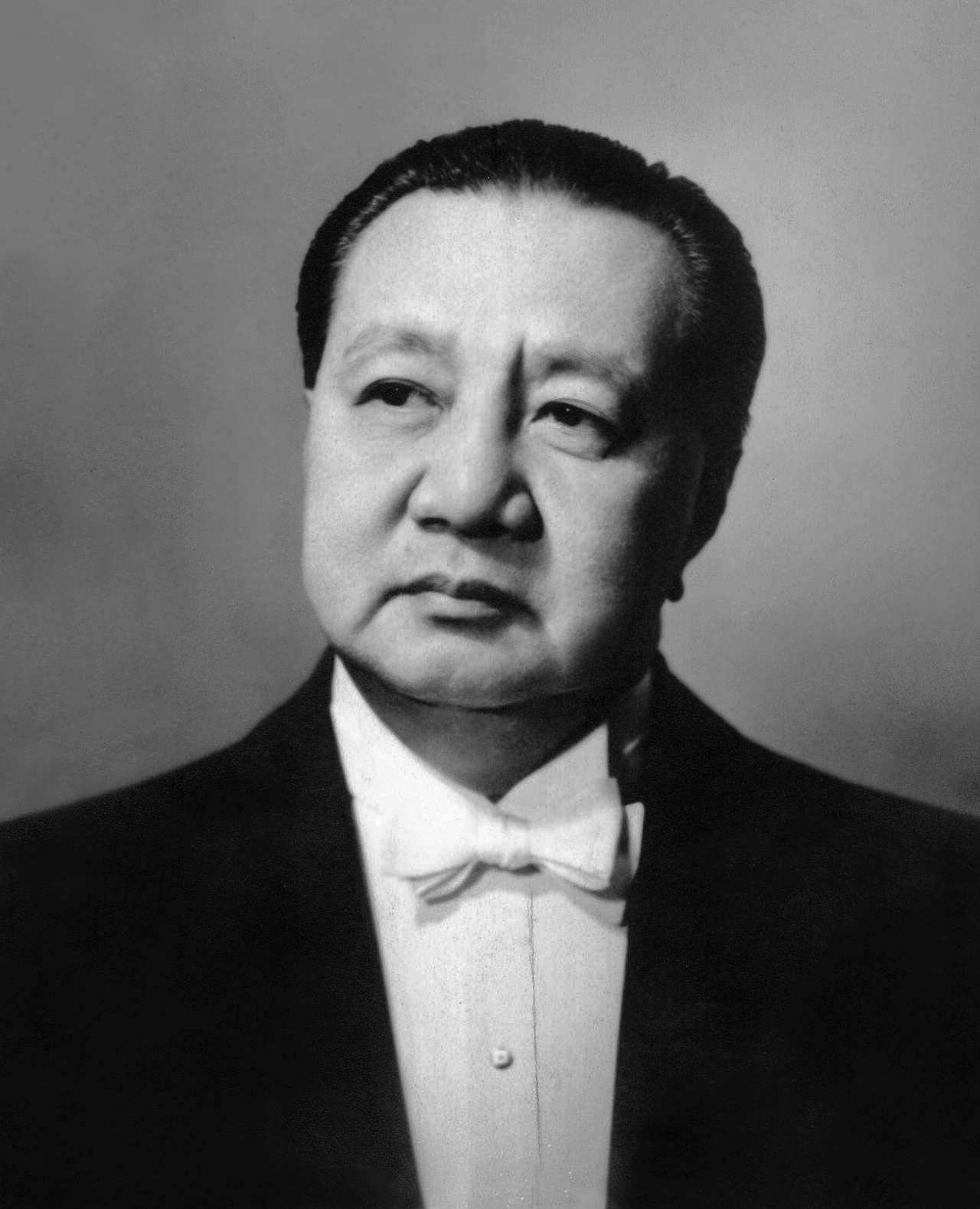
Elpidio Quirino is the shortest-serving vice president, serving for 1 year, 325 days (690 days) before succeeding to the Presidency.

Updated daily according to UTC.

| Rank | Vice president | Length | | Order of vice presidency | President served under | Number of terms |
|---|---|---|---|---|---|---|
| 1 | Fernando Lopez | 1,461 days | 4,036 days | 3 • December 30, 1949 – December 30, 1953 | Elpidio Quirino | Two full terms (nonconsecutive) |
| 1 | Fernando Lopez | 2,575 days | 4,036 days | 7 • December 30, 1965 – January 17, 1973 | Ferdinand Marcos | Two full terms (nonconsecutive) |
| 2 | Sergio Osmeña | 3,182 days | | 1 • November 15, 1935 – August 1, 1944 | Manuel L. Quezon | One full term; succeeded to the presidency 945 days into second term (Note: Sergio Osmeña was elected in 1935 to serve a term set to end in 1941, initially set to six years without reelection, according to the original 1935 Constitution. Amendments made to the Constitution in 1940 allowed Osmeña to seek a second term. He was later elected in 1941 to serve until 1943, but his term was further extended by the Joint Resolution No. 95 of the United States Congress due to the Japanese occupation of the Philippines in 1943. Osmeña succeeded to the presidency after the death of Manuel L. Quezon in 1944.) |
| 3 | Salvador Laurel | 2,317 days | | 8 • February 25, 1986 – June 30, 1992 | Corazon Aquino | One full term (Note: Salvador Laurel assumed the vice presidency after the People Power Revolution in 1986. He was eligible for re-election in 1992, but made an unsuccessful bid for the presidency.) |
| 4 | Jejomar Binay | 2,192 days | | 13 • June 30, 2010 – June 30, 2016 | Benigno Aquino III | One full term (Note: Served one full six-year term, according to the 1987 Constitution.) |
| 5 (tie) | Joseph Estrada | 2,191 days | | 9 • June 30, 1992 – June 30, 1998 | Fidel V. Ramos | One full term |
| 5 (tie) | Noli de Castro | 2,191 days | | 12 • June 30, 2004 – June 30, 2010 | Gloria Macapagal Arroyo | One full term |
| 5 (tie) | Leni Robredo | 2,191 days | | 14 • June 30, 2016 – June 30, 2022 | Rodrigo Duterte | One full term |
| 6 | Sara Duterte | 1,462 days | | 15 • June 30, 2022 – present | Bongbong Marcos | Currently serving (Note: Elected to serve one full six-year term, according to the 1987 Constitution.) |
| 7 (tie) | Diosdado Macapagal | 1,461 days | | 5 • December 30, 1957 – December 30, 1961 | Carlos P. Garcia | One full term (Note: Served one full four-year term, according to the amended 1935 Constitution.) |
| 7 (tie) | Emmanuel Pelaez | 1,461 days | | 6 • December 30, 1961 – December 30, 1965 | Diosdado Macapagal | One full term |
| 11 | Teofisto Guingona Jr. | 1,239 days | | 11 • February 7, 2001 – June 30, 2004 | Gloria Macapagal Arroyo | Appointed to one partial term (Note: Teofisto Guingona Jr. was appointed vice president by Gloria Macapagal Arroyo 2 years, 222 days into what would have been her six-year term, according to the 1987 Constitution, upon her succession to the presidency in 2001.) |
| 12 | Carlos P. Garcia | 1,174 days | | 4 • December 30, 1953 – March 18, 1957 | Ramon Magsaysay | Succeeded to the presidency 1,174 days into term (Note: Carlos P. Garcia was elected in 1953 to serve a four-year term according to the amended 1935 Constitution, but succeeded to the presidency after the death of Ramon Magsaysay in 1957.) |
| 13 | Gloria Macapagal Arroyo | 935 days | | 10 • June 30, 1998 – January 20, 2001 | Joseph Estrada | Succeeded to the presidency 935 days into term (Note: Gloria Macapagal Arroyo was elected in 1998 to serve a six-year term according to the 1987 Constitution, but succeeded to the presidency after the removal from office of Joseph Estrada in the Second EDSA Revolution in 2001.) |
| 14 | Elpidio Quirino | 690 days | | 2 • May 28, 1946 – April 17, 1948 | Manuel Roxas | Succeeded to the presidency 690 days into term (Note: Elpidio Quirino was elected in 1946 to serve a four-year term according to the amended 1935 Constitution, but succeeded to the presidency after the death of Manuel Roxas in 1948.) |
