= Benpres Building =

Office building in Pasig, Philippines

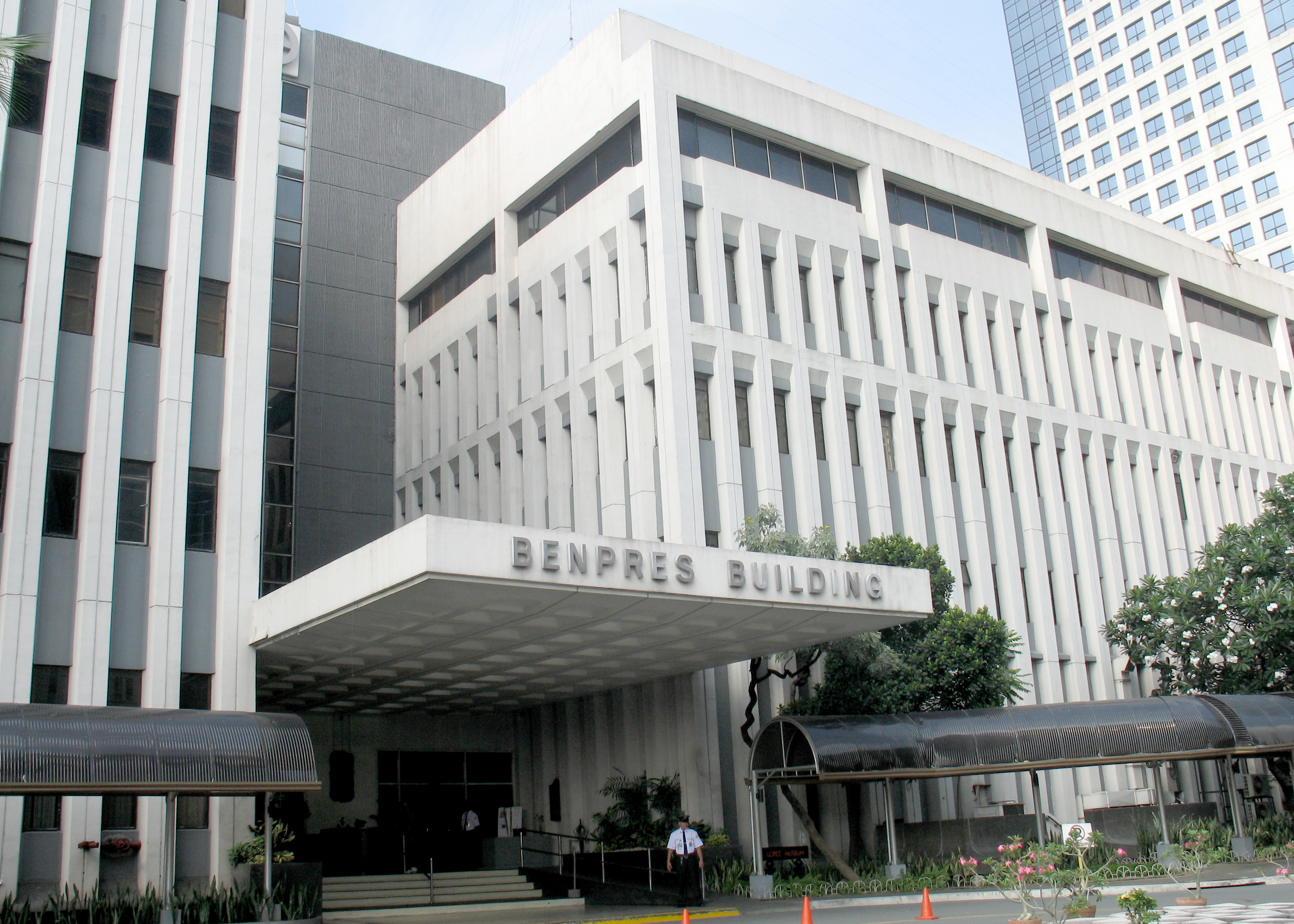
- The Benpres Building in 2008.
- Interactive map of the Benpres Building area
- Former names: Chronicle Building

General information
- Architectural style: Modernist
- Location: Ortigas Center, Pasig, Metro Manila, Philippines
- Coordinates: 14.5825°N 121.0629°E
- Completed: 1969
- Demolished: 2019

Technical details
- Floor count: 6

Design and construction
- Architect: Gabriel Formoso

The Benpres Building (Tagalog: Gusaling Benpres), originally known as the Chronicle Building, was a six-story Filipino modernist heritage building built in 1969 and inaugurated on April 3, 1971, located in Ortigas Center, Pasig.

The building was designed by architect Gabriel Formoso and built in 1969 to serve as the new headquarters of the Manila Chronicle. The newspaper formally transferred to the building in February 1971 and the building was formally dedicated on April 2, 1971. However, President Ferdinand Marcos, Sr's declaration of Martial Law less than two years later saw the closure of the Chronicle, and the newspaper did not return to the building even after Marcos was deposed in the People Power Revolution of 1986. The building was subsequently returned to the López family and was renamed the Benpres Building after Eugenio López, Sr.'s parents—former Iloilo governor Benito López, and Presentación Hofileña López.

In 2016, the López Group of Companies announced its intentions to redevelop the property on which the Benpres building stood, with two buildings planned to rise on the property, and move its operations to Mandaluyong. The building was demolished in 2019.
