= López family of Iloilo =

Filipino family

- Business and political family
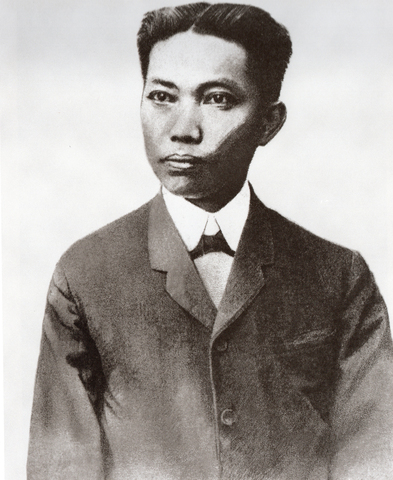
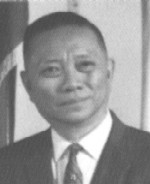
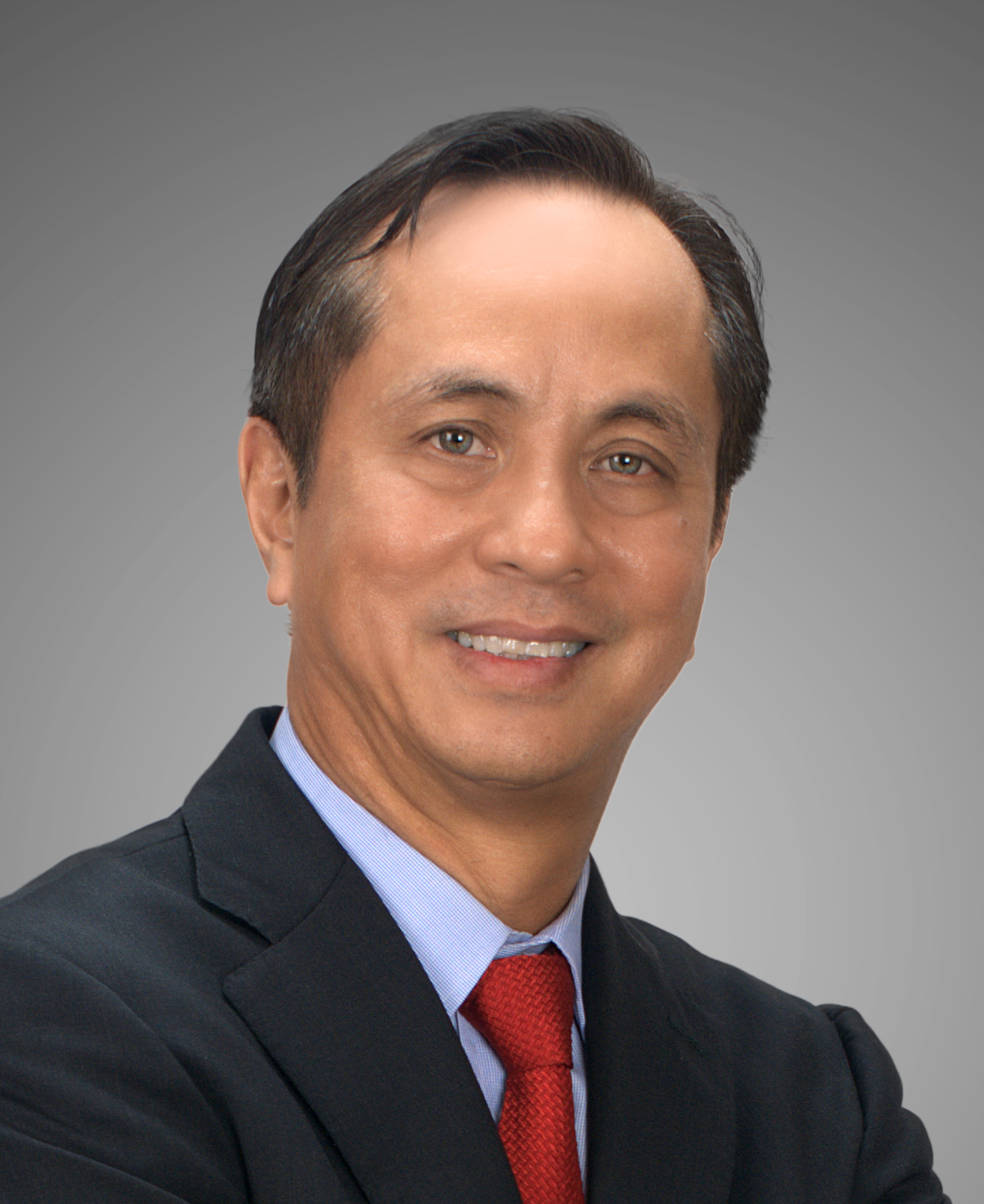
- Benito López Fernando Lopez Eugenio Lopez III
- Country: Philippines
- Current region: Western Visayas; Negros Island Region; Metro Manila
- Origin: Jaro, Iloilo City, Captaincy General of the Philippines
- Founder: Basilio López
- Members: List: Benito López; Eugenio López Sr.; Eugenio López Jr.; Eugenio López III; Fernando López; Federico López; Gina López; Jules Ledesma; Manuel López; Maria Rachel Arenas; Mark López; Oscar López; Presentación López-Psinakis and others
- Motto: Honor, Riqueza, Gloria (Honor, Wealth, Glory)
- Heirlooms: Lopez Holdings Corporation

The López family of Iloílo is a wealthy and influential Filipino-Chinese family of business magnates, media proprietors, politicians, and philanthropists. The family originated from Jaro, Iloilo, and rose to prominence during the late Spanish colonial and early American periods through their involvement in the sugar milling industry and local politics. Their lineage traces back to Basilio López (c. 1810–c. 1875), a Sangley merchant or taipan who adopted the surname "López" from his Spanish master. He later married Sabina Jalandoni (1816–1882), a member of another prominent Iloilo family, and together they had fifteen children.

The most prominent members of the family were brothers Eugenio "Eñíng" H. López, Sr. (1901–1975) and Fernando "Nandíng" H. López (1904–1993), great-grandsons of Basilio López and grandsons of Eugenio "Kapitán" J. López (1839–1906). Their business interests later became the López Group of Companies, which includes the Philippine media company ABS-CBN Corporation and its namesake content distribution network, and the power generation and distribution company First Philippine Holdings Corporation. Fernando López also served twice as Vice President of the Philippines, under Presidents Elpidio Quirino and Ferdinand Marcos.

== History ==
=== Origin ===
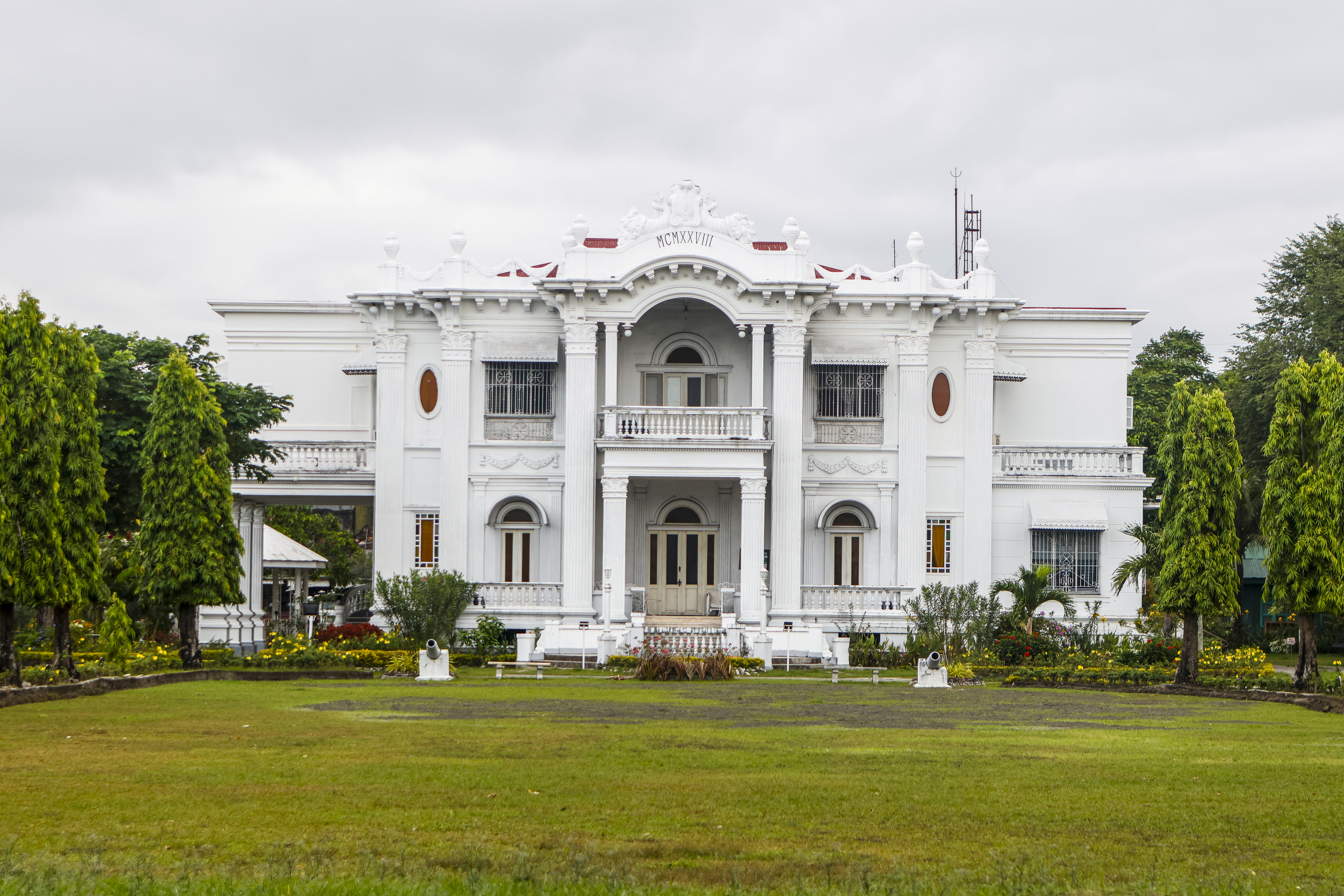
Lopez Heritage House, one of the heritage houses of the family

The López family traces its origins to Basilio López, who was believed to have been born in Batangas in 1810. As a young boy, he left home and settled in Jaro, Iloilo, where he was taken in by a Spaniard whose surname, López, he later adopted. When his benefactor left the country, Basilio was entrusted to the wealthy but childless Jalandoni couple. The couple had legally adopted María Sabina Jaranilla (1816–1882), the daughter of their laundress, whom Basilio later married in 1849. Together, they inherited the Jalandoni wealth and raised a large family. Basilio and Sabina had fifteen children: Clara, Eulogia, Eugenio, Gregoria, Estanislao, Marcelo, Claudio, Simón, Agripino, Francisco, Cipriana, Eulalia, Eusebio, Ysidora, and María. Basilio also served as cabeza de barangay, gobernadorcillo, and mayor of Jaro in the 1840s to 1860s.

Among their fifteen children, Eugenio (1839–1906) and Marcelo (1843–1882) married two prominent members of the Villanueva clan from Molo, Iloilo, Marcela and Julita, respectively, who had built wealth in the shipping business. Eugenio and Marcela had sixteen children, including Benito (1877–1908), who married Presentación Hofileña y Javelona. The two children of Benito and Presentación were Eugenio López Sr. (1901–1975) and Fernando López (1904–1993), two of the most prominent members of the family.

Two current Filipino parliamentarians who do not bear the López surname are descended from the family, with both of them tracing their roots to Julieta Hofileña López (daughter of Benito and Presentación (Note: Julieta was a posthomous child, as Benito López died in 1908, two years before Julieta was born.)): Pangasinan's 3rd district congresswoman Maria Rachel Arenas and Negros Occidental's 1st district representative Jules Ledesma.

=== Sugar industry ===
The López family were once among the most prominent family of hacenderos in Iloilo during the early 1900s. Outside Iloilo, the López family also owned numerous haciendas in Negros, first acquired by Eugenio López (1839–1906) during the Spanish colonial period. They were heavily engaged in the sugar milling industry and was an influential political family during the early American colonial period. To expand their sugar empire, the Lópezes made intermarriage between different native sugar centralists. For instance, Eugenio's brother Eusebio founded the Sagay Sugar Central and was married to the sister of Cesar Ledesma, Talisay Sugar Central's vice-president. Descendants of Iloilo merchant Basilio López intermarried with Ilonggo families and others from Cebu, Spain, and America.

During the 1921 Philippine financial crisis, the López family avoided disaster by distancing themselves from the Philippine National Bank under PNB president Venancio Concepcion. Concepcion was later arrested of fraud. In 1927, the Lopez family gave their own assets to finance the Lopez Sugar Central located in northern Negros. Much like the Negros's hacenderos in the 1920s, the family also spent their money on exorbitant luxuries which worsened their debts. In 1928, the Philippines Free Press mocked the sugar situation in Negros by portraying a Negros woman inviting Batangas revolutionary leader Don Sixto López just for him to be crippled with debt.

=== Business ventures and political career ===
Despite inheriting the haciendas left by their father, the López brothers, Eugenio and Fernando, started humbly as bus operators in the 1930s. To improve the financial standing of his family, Eugenio López began business ventures outside the sugar industry. He invested in the transportation sector, establishing the Iloilo Transportation Co., valued at ₱250,000 in 1937, and acquiring Panay Autobus in 1938 for ₱565,000. The Iloilo Transportation Company introduced the first double-decker buses in Asia. In 1932, the family also founded the Iloilo-Negros Air Express Company, Inc., recognized as the Philippines' first commercial airline. However, the airline was wiped out in a surprise Japanese raid in 1941. They were later joined by sugar businessmen such as Nicholas Lizares and Salvador Araneta in pioneering air passenger services in the Visayas. Much like the Lópezes, the Lizares family also diversified away from the sugar industry. In the 1930s, the López family attempted to acquire the government-owned sugar central in Binalbagan, Negros Occidental, but was unsuccessful.

As the López family grew more influential and wealthy, Fernando López advanced in his political career. He was first appointed mayor of Iloilo City, later elected as a senator, and eventually served twice as Vice President of the Philippines—under President Elpidio Quirino (1949–1953) and President Ferdinand Marcos (1965–1973). Fernando founded Iloilo City Colleges in 1947, which later became the University of Iloilo. Meanwhile, Eugenio López expanded the family’s business interests, beginning with the sale of Far Eastern Air Transport in 1947 for ₱2.8 million and the acquisition of the Binalbagan-Isabela Sugar Milling Co. in 1951 for ₱2.7 million. In 1956, the two brothers founded the Chronicle Broadcasting Network (CBN), and later acquired Alto Broadcasting System (ABS) from Elpidio Quirino and James Lindenberg in 1957. The merger of the two companies became known as ABS-CBN Corporation, which established the first television network in the Philippines through its namesake network. ABS-CBN's main headquarters is in Quezon City, with additional studios and area of operation of the company and network is at ABS-CBN Soundstage in Bulacan.

Eugenio López also purchased the Meralco Security Corporation during the 1960s, which by June 1973 had a book value of more than ₱1 billion. In 1993, Eugenio and Fernando López established the Lopez Holdings Corporation as the umbrella company for the family’s expanding business interests. Other companies incorporated under the group included First Philippine Holdings Corporation (FPH), which oversees subsidiaries such as First Gen Corporation, Energy Development Corporation (EDC), Rockwell Land Corporation, First Philippine Industrial Park, Panay Electric Company, First Philec Corporation, and First Balfour, Inc. The family also established NLEX Corporation that owned from 1997 until its transfer to Metro Pacific Investments Corporation (MPIC) on August 2008, which operates and maintains the North Luzon Expressway (NLEX) and Subic–Clark–Tarlac Expressway (SCTEX).

Starting in the middle 2000s, they largely exited their legacy businesses ( BayanTel - sold to Globe, MERALCO , NLEX - sold to Metro Pacific Investments (MPIC), Maynilad to MPIC and DM Consunji Holdings, Inc. (DMCI) ) to focus on power ( First Gen ) and media (ABS-CBN).

== Members ==
Image	Name	Description
	Albertito López	Representative from the second district of Iloilo
	Benito Villanueva López	Governor of Iloilo from 1903 to 1908
	Eugenio Hofileña López, Sr.	Chairman of ABS-CBN Corporation from 1956 to 1972
	Eugenio Moreno López, Jr.	Chairman of ABS-CBN Corporation from 1993 to 1997
	Eugenio Gabriel La'O López III	Chairman of ABS-CBN Corporation from 1997 to 2018
	Oscar M. López	Chairman and CEO of First Philippine Holdings Corporation from 1986 to 2010; later Chairman Emeritus from 2010 to 2020
	Fernando Hofileña López	3rd and 7th Vice President of the Philippines
	Gina La'O López	Secretary of Environment and Natural Resources from 2016 to 2017
	José López	A member of the Philippine Assembly from Negros Occidental
	Jules Ledesma	Representative from the first district of Negros Occidental
	Manuel Villanueva López	Senator of the Philippines from 1916 to 1919
	Maria Rachel Arenas	Representative from the third district of Pangasinan
	Martin Lagdameo López	Chairman of ABS-CBN Corporation since 2018
	Ramón López	A member of the Philippine Assembly from Iloilo
	Federico R. López	Chairman and CEO of First Philippine Holdings Corporation since 2010
