= Gina Lopez =

Filipino environmentalist and philanthropist (1953–2019)

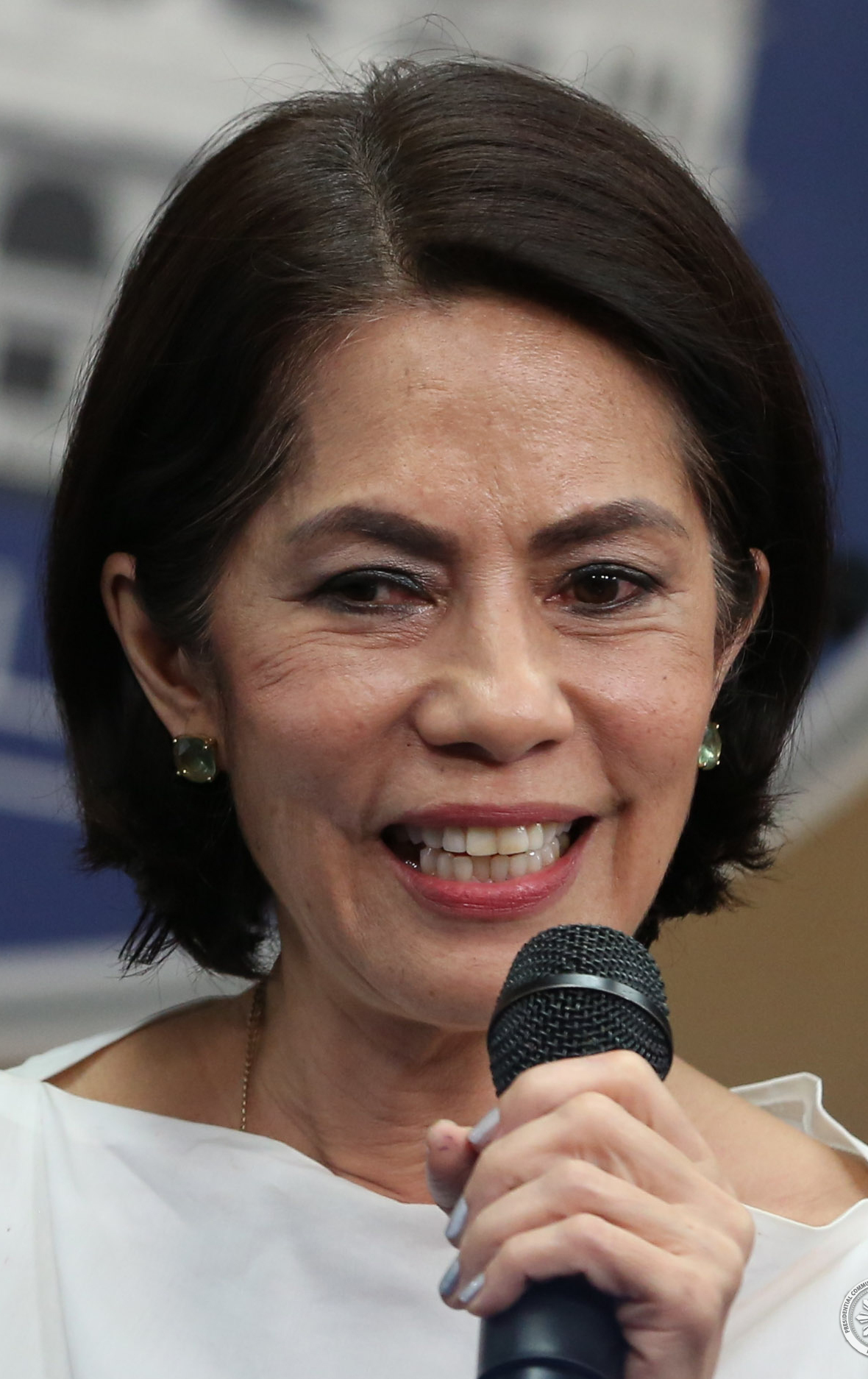
- Lopez in 2017

Secretary of Environment and Natural Resources
- Ad interim
- In office June 30, 2016 – May 3, 2017
- President: Rodrigo Duterte
- Preceded by: Ramon Paje
- Succeeded by: Roy Cimatu

Chairperson of the Pasig River Rehabilitation Commission
- In office August 23, 2010 – August 19, 2019
- President: Benigno S. Aquino III; Rodrigo Duterte
- Preceded by: Horacio C. Ramos
- Succeeded by: Jose Antonio E. Goitia

Personal details
- Born: Regina Paz La'O Lopez; December 27, 1953 Manila, Philippines
- Died: August 19, 2019 (aged 65) Makati, Metro Manila, Philippines
- Resting place: Manila Memorial Park, Parañaque, Metro Manila
- Citizenship: Filipino
- Spouse: Sona Roy (separated)
- Children: Roberto "Bobby" Roy; Benjamin "Ben" Roy
- Parents: Eugenio Lopez Jr.; Conchita La'O
- Relatives: Lopez family
- Education: Assumption College; Boston College; Asian Institute of Management
- Occupation: Cabinet secretary; executive; environmentalist; philanthropist

Regina Paz "Gina" La'O Lopez (Tagalog: [ˈdʒinɐ ˈlɔpɛs]; December 27, 1953 – August 19, 2019) was a Filipino environmentalist and philanthropist who served as Secretary of the Philippines' Department of Environment and Natural Resources (DENR) in an ad interim basis under the Duterte administration. She was previously the Chairperson of the Pasig River Rehabilitation Commission under two consecutive administrations. Lopez was also a yoga missionary and a pioneer for corporate social responsibility.

== Early life ==
Gina was the daughter of ABS-CBN Chairman Emeritus Eugenio Lopez Jr. of Iloilo and Conchita La'o of Manila. She had six siblings, including Eugenio Lopez III. Lopez went to Assumption College and Newton College of the Sacred Heart in Boston (which was later integrated into Boston College). While she did not obtain a bachelor's degree, she held a master's degree in Development Management from the Asian Institute of Management. She had two sons, Roberto and Benjamin.

== Civic involvement ==
After studying in the United States, Lopez left her privileged life in Manila and became a yoga missionary for twenty dedicated years and lived in Portugal, India, and Africa. She met her future husband in Africa with whom she had two sons. She became an Ananda Marga yoga missionary who taught yoga, and ran pre-primary schools and children's homes for the underprivileged. She lived among the people of slum areas in Africa guided by the slogan ‘Service to humanity is service to God’.

When she returned to the Philippines, she initiated corporate social responsibility programs for the environment and Filipino communities. She became the managing director of the ABS-CBN Foundation.

She initiated Bantay Bata 163, the country's first media-based hotline. In 1997, Bantay Bata was the United Nations Grand Awardee for Excellence besting 187 countries all over the world.

She established Bantay Kalikasan, for which she received the 1997 International Public Relations Award of Excellence for the Environment and outstanding Manilans Award for the Environment, 2009.

She produced educational television shows on Science, Math, Values, History and English for elementary and Philippine Literature for high school. For Sine'skwela, Ms. Lopez was honored with the UNESCo Kalinga Award, the first Southeast Asian to earn such a distinction.

She was also the vice-chairperson of the ABS-CBN Bayan Foundation, which provides microfinance assistance to micro-entrepreneurs. She was also the Chairman Emeritus of the Southeast Asian Children's Television.

Lopez also initiated the rehabilitation of the Pasig River and nearby urban streams through the Kapit Bisig para sa Ilog Pasig project. once considered as the lifeline of the Filipino nation, the Pasig River is one of the most polluted and toxic river systems in the Philippines today. For her efforts in rehabilitating the river, she was appointed in 2010 by President Benigno Aquino III as the Chairperson of the Pasig River Rehabilitation Commission. Her efforts in the commission led to a river rehabilitation revolution which cleansed numerous tributaries in the Pasig river system. She was also responsible for the reforestation of the La Mesa Watershed Reservation, the last remaining forest zone in Metro Manila.

She organized Bayanijuan (lit. 'Country of Juan'). Lopez also launched the Save Palawan Movement along with her partner organizations and gathered 7 million signatures for a petition for protection of key biodiversity areas and against mining. Lopez was a vehement anti-mining advocate, known for her stance against large-scale mining in the province of Palawan. She backed the No Mining In Palawan Movement. She also objected to the use of fossil fuels as sources of energy and coal mining.

== Secretary of Environment and Natural Resources ==
During a courtesy visit with President Rodrigo Duterte in Davao City, Lopez initiated an environmental lecture for Duterte about the need for a better national environmental policy. Duterte then asked her to be his secretary for environment. A few days later, she accepted the offer and was formally appointed by the president to head the Department of Environment and Natural Resources or DENR. She was grilled by social media on her appointment because of her family name, Lopez, which is much regarded as a Filipino business tycoon surname.

She hit the ground running on the very first day in office. She audited all mining sites and firms in the entire country and stripped environmental certificates from a chunk of the mining industry due to massive violations against the environment and the law, the first time a secretary of environment had done so. This led to a massive public show of support for Lopez's work as DENR secretary and an apology to her for the grilling she suffered on social media. Few of the many notable certificates that were stripped were those for mining companies doing operations in Semirara Island (a key biodiversity area) in Antique, Eastern Samar, Surigao del Sur which is home to indigenous Lumad communities, and Cordillera Administrative Region, which is the melting pot of the northern Luzon indigenous people. Lopez advocated a 100% renewable energy Philippines and was vehemently opposed to mining having stated, "The Philippines does not need mining." Her anti-mining sentiment was backed by years of Philippine research on mining, both ecologically and economically. She also said that there would be no mining operations of any form on Palawan, which is popularly known as the last ecological frontier of the country. Within less than 2 months, she audited all mining firms from Luzon, Visayas, and Mindanao. She was also an indigenous people (IP) advocate. She immediately established forums for consultations between the DENR and the indigenous people sector in the Philippines, the first time a DENR secretary did so. She also established the first ever DENR public hotline wherein the public could report all environmental violations of any entity in the country directly to the DENR and her office. She was against nuclear energy due to years of research on the matter. The Nuclear Power Plant in Bataan will only contribute to less than 0.5% to the National Energy Grid when operated and its costs will be much higher, making it unsustainable. She preferred the establishment of more wind and solar power plants, which are massively cheaper and sustainable in the long-run, and the possible cooperation of the Philippines and Australia to establish the first wave energy plants in Asia. The Philippines is the center of the Pacific Typhoon Belt, bestowing it with the most maximized wind and wave shocks in the world.

In a public announcement, she told the media that all buffer zones in all protected areas in the country shall also be revitalized into their natural state. She was also pushing for the establishment of numerous protected areas in the country such as the West Panay Mountain Range National Park. She also announced that the UP Arboretum would be an ecological paradise where the informal settlers in the area will be the partners for its development. Her environmental policies were much criticized by some big business ventures and pro-mining lawmakers (her father owns one of the biggest companies in the country), but were backed by numerous environmental and human rights NGo's. In a recent survey, Filipinos backed Lopez's environmental policy by a huge majority. She was called a symbol and champion of environmental conservation in the country ever since.

Lopez's appointment as Environment Secretary was rejected by the Commission on Appointments (CA) in a vote of 8–16 on May 3, 2017, amid issues over her controversial policies and alleged incompetence. She was the second member of President Rodrigo Duterte's cabinet to be rejected by the Commission on Appointments following former Department of Foreign Affairs Secretary Perfecto Yasay. In a press conference after the announcement of her rejection, Lopez thanked the eight CA members who "voted according to their conscience" and urged the legislators to look after the needs of the poor and not of big businesses. She said "it is unfortunate that business interest have in fact run the day." She added "if government co-opts to big businesses, then what hope does the poor have? What message are we giving here? If you wanna be confirmed, don't go against big businesses."

== Return to private sector and public activism ==
Lopez hosted an environmental show on ABS-CBN, entitled G Diaries, which premiered on June 4, 2017. The show focuses on environmental conservation and innovations. The show also premiered on ANC due to its high ratings.

She became the first Filipino to be awarded the prestigious Seacology Prize on October 5, 2017, in Berkeley, California. The prize states that Lopez is "someone who has shown exceptional achievement in preserving island environments and culture" and “shown the vision and courage the Seacology Prize is meant to honor. She has fought for the Philippines environment and gave island communities there a voice in the decisions that affect their natural resources and their lives.” She was also cited for establishing the first ever consultations between the government and indigenous groups in the Philippines and for banning open-pit mining.

In the same month, Lopez campaigned against the possible lifting of the open-pit mining ban, which she installed while DENR secretary. It was revealed that newly appointed DENR Secretary Roy Cimatu supported the lifting of the ban, causing outrage from environmental organizations. The lifting of the ban was eventually supported by President Duterte, despite backing Lopez's imposition of the ban in early 2017. On October 24, the ban was officially lifted by the Mining Industry Coordinating Council (MICC), a commission which advocated mining in the Philippines. 26 mining agreements that were halted by Lopez were sent by Cimatu to the MICC for evaluation and confirmation as well.

== Death and legacy ==
Lopez was diagnosed with brain cancer. She died of multiple organ failure related to the disease at Makati Medical Center on August 19, 2019, at the age of 65.

In February 2020, the ABS-CBN Foundation Building was renamed to Gina Lopez Building in her honor.

== In popular culture ==
Lopez was portrayed by Paula Peralejo in the 1995 film Eskapo.

== Awards ==
- 1997: United Nations Grand Awardee for Excellence for the Bantay Bata 163
- 1997: International Public Relations Award of Excellence for the Environment
- 1998: UNESCO Kalinga Prize. Lopez was the first Southeast Asian to receive the award
- 2009: Outstanding Manilans Award for the Environment
- 2017: Seacology Prize

Political offices
Preceded by Ramon Paje	Secretary of Environment and Natural Resources; Ad interim 2016–2017	Succeeded by Roy Cimatu
Preceded by Horacio C. Ramos	Chairperson of the Pasig River Rehabilitation Commission; 2010–2019	Succeeded by Jose Antonio Goitia
