= Benito Lopez (politician) =

Filipino politician (1877–1908)

The Honorable Benito López
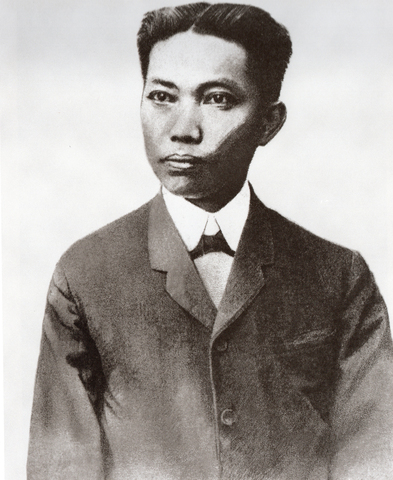

3rd Governor of Iloilo
- In office 1906–1908
- Preceded by: Raymundo Melliza
- Succeeded by: Ruperto Montinola

Personal details
- Born: Benito López y Villanueva; April 3, 1877 Iloilo, Captaincy General of the Philippines
- Died: January 20, 1908 (aged 30) Iloilo, Philippine Islands
- Party: Federalista (1906–1908)
- Spouse: Presentación Hofileña
- Children: Eugenio; Fernando
- Parents: Eugenio López; Marcela Villanueva
- Relatives: López family

Benito Villanueva López (April 3, 1877 – January 20, 1908) was a Filipino politician. He was a member of the influential Lopez family. Lopez was governor of Iloilo from 1903 until his assassination in 1908.

== Biography ==
Benito López was born on April 3, 1877. He was the ninth child of Eugenio López, one of the wealthiest sugar barons on Negros, and Marcela Villanueva. His younger brother was Ramón López, a member of the Philippine Assembly from Iloilo.

Immediately after the Philippine Revolution, he founded the newspaper El Tiempo, which grew to be Iloilo City's top newspaper. López also used the newspaper to launch his political career. He joined the Federalista Party in 1900 or 1901. In 1903 he won the election for governor of Iloilo. He was reelected in 1906.

On December 27, 1907, López was shot in his office by Joaquín Gil, a follower of Francisco Jalandoni, a political rival of López. A few weeks later, López died at the age of 30 at the Mission Hospital in Iloilo from the injuries sustained.

== Personal life and family ==
López was married to Presentación Hofileña and had two children with her. Their elder son, Eugenio López, owned, among other things, the Manila Chronicle newspaper and was founder and owner of the Chronicle Broadcasting Network, a predecessor of ABS-CBN Corporation. Their other son, Fernando López, served as mayor of Iloilo City, a member of the Senate of the Philippines, and Vice President of the Philippines for two terms, under Presidents Elpidio Quirino (1949 to 1953) and Ferdinand Marcos (1965 to 1972).

Political offices
Preceded by Raymundo Melliza	Governor of Iloilo; 1906–1908	Succeeded by Ruperto Montinola
