= Eugenio Lopez Jr. =

Filipino businessman (1928–1999)

Eugenio "Geny" M. López Jr.

Chairman, ABS-CBN (Broadcasting) Corporation
- In office May 26, 1993 – May 26, 1997
- Preceded by: Fernando López
- Succeeded by: Eugenio López III

President/CEO, ABS-CBN Corporation^{[a]}
- In office September 24, 1956 – May 26, 1993^{[b]}
- Succeeded by: Eugenio López III

Personal details
- Born: Eugenio Moreno López Jr. November 4, 1928 Iloilo City, Iloilo, Philippine Islands
- Died: June 28, 1999 (aged 70) Hillsborough, California, U.S.
- Resting place: Manila Memorial Park – Sucat, Parañaque, Philippines
- Spouse: Conchita La'O
- Children: Eugenio Gabriel López III; Regina Paz L. López; María Rosario L. López; Rafael Kevin L. López; Roberta Pilar L. López; Ernesto Miguel L. López; Ramón Javier L. López
- Parents: Eugenio López Sr.; Pacita Moreno
- Occupation: Chairman, ABS-CBN Corporation; Businessman
- Notes: 1. Formerly Chronicle Broadcasting Network ABS-CBN suspended its operations from September 22, 1972 – September 7, 1986 due to Martial Law.

Eugenio "Geny" Moreno López Jr. (Tagalog: [juˈhɛnjo ˈlɔpɛs]; November 4, 1928 – June 28, 1999) was the chairman emeritus of ABS-CBN Corporation from 1997 to 1999. He was known within the López Group of Companies as "Kapitán" (Filipino for "Captain"). His great-grandfather Eugenio J. López (1839–1906) was also known as "Kapitán Eugenio" ("Captain Eugenio") during his time.

== Early life ==
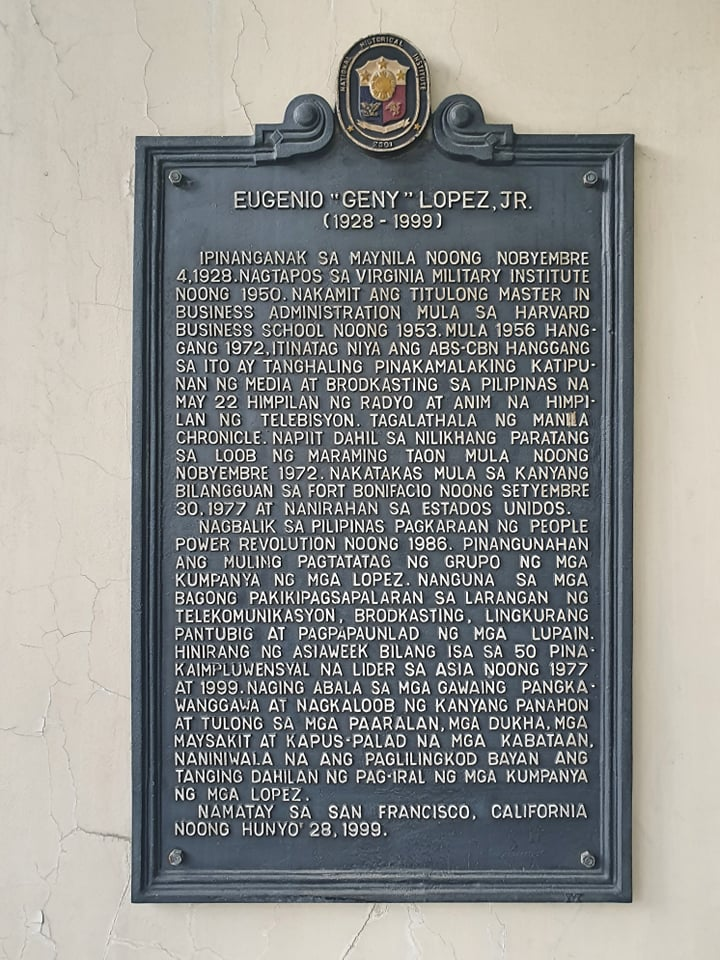
Historical marker installed by the National Historical Commission of the Philippines commemorating Geny López

Eugenio Moreno López Jr. was born in 1928 in Iloilo City. His parents were Eugenio Hofileña López Sr. and Pacita de Santos Moreno. He was a nephew of former Philippine Vice President Fernando Lopez. He was educated at San Beda College, the Ateneo de Manila, Virginia Military Institute where he earned a Bachelor of Arts degree, and Harvard University where he earned an MBA from Harvard Business School.

In 1956, he purchased equipment for the radio and television stations of ABS-CBN Corporation, which his father owned. He would later lead ABS-CBN as its president until 1972. His father remained as the chairman and CEO.

== Death ==
Lopez died of cancer on June 28, 1999, in Hillsborough, California, six months before the inauguration of the Millennium Transmitter and the new office building and studio annex of ABS-CBN Broadcasting Center. The office building was named in his memory.

== In popular culture ==
Lopez was portrayed by Christopher de Leon in the 1995 film Eskapo.

Media offices
First	ABS-CBN President/CEO; 1956 –1972	Vacant Network shutdown Title next held by Himself
Vacant Network shutdown Title last held by Himself	ABS-CBN President/CEO; 1986 – 1993	Succeeded by Eugenio L. Lopez III
Preceded by Fernando H. Lopez	ABS-CBN Chairman; 1993 – 1997	Succeeded by Eugenio L. Lopez III
First	ABS-CBN Chairman-Emeritus; 1997 – 1999	Vacant Title next held by Eugenio L. Lopez III
