= Ramón Paje =

Filipino politician

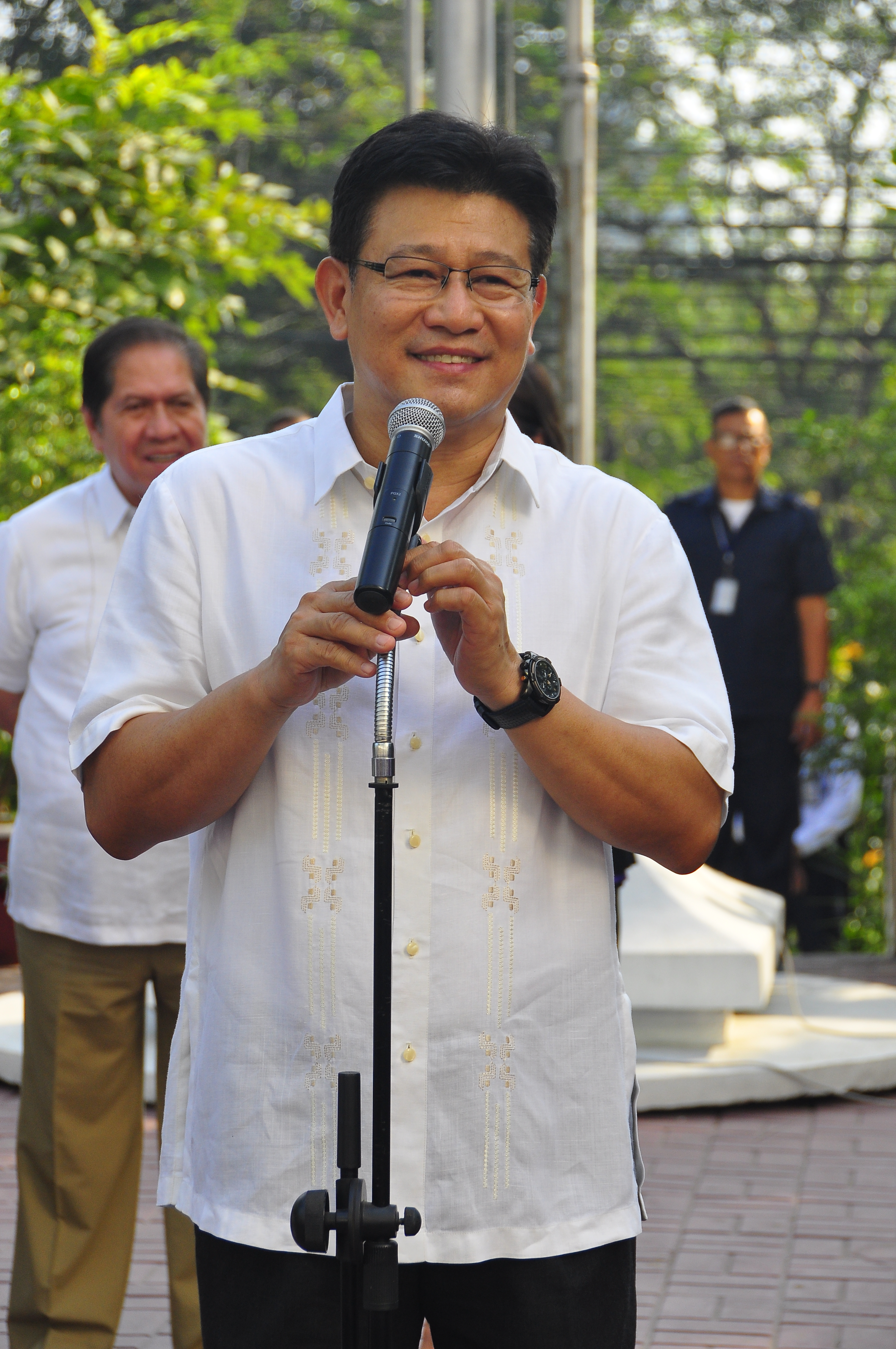
- Paje in March 2016

Secretary of Environment and Natural Resources
- In office June 30, 2010 – June 30, 2016
- President: Benigno Aquino III
- Preceded by: Horacio Ramos
- Succeeded by: Gina Lopez (Ad interim)

Undersecretary of Environment and Natural Resources
- President: Gloria Macapagal Arroyo

Personal details
- Born: November 27, 1960 (age 65) Guinobatan, Albay, Philippines
- Occupation: Politician

Ramón Jesús Palmiano Paje is a Filipino civil servant. He was the 19th secretary of the Department of Environment and Natural Resources (DENR) under the administration of President Benigno Aquino III. Prior to his appointment, he was DENR Undersecretary for Field Operations and Executive Director of the Minerals Development Council under the Office of the President in concurrent capacity.

== Education and early career ==
Paje is a holder of a doctoral degree in public administration and a top-rank Career Executive Service Officer (CESO I).

Fresh from college, Paje began his civil service career in 1982 as a junior forester conducting field inspection of reforestation projects of then Bureau of Forest Development (now the Forest Management Bureau), then rose from the ranks serving the environment and natural resources sector in various capacities, including undersecretary for environment and programs development, assistant secretary for management services, director for human resources development, among others.

Paje is a graduate of Bachelor of Science in Forestry from the University of the Philippines Los Baños, Laguna (UPLB). He finished his M.A. in Urban and Regional Planning and Doctor of Public Administration at the University of the Philippines Diliman in Quezon City. He took a special training on Environmental Economics and Policy Analysis from Harvard University's John F. Kennedy School of Government and a Diploma on Human Resources Development and Management from the Australian National University in Canberra.

== Awards ==
In 1996, Paje received the Ten Outstanding Young Men (TOYM) award from the Philippine Jaycees, Outstanding Professional of the Philippines award from the Professional Regulation Commission, and the Outstanding Alumnus in Government Service from the University of the Philippines at Los Baños. In 1999, he was the Dr. Jose Rizal "Huwarang Pilipino Awardee" for public service given by the Parangal ng Bayan Awards Foundation. In 2010, then-Secretary Paje received the Distinguished Alumnus award from the Harvard Club of the Philippines. In 2011, he was conferred a Paragon Award by the Career Executive Service Board and was once again honored by UPLB with an Outstanding Alumnus Award for Government Service and in 2012, he was given the Outstanding Alumnus Award from the UP National College of Public Administration and Governance.

== As DENR Secretary ==
Dr. Ramon Jesus P. Paje was recently designated by the Department of Environment and Natural Resources (DENR) as Global Campaigner for Biodiversity (pro bono), in support to the ASEAN Center for Biodiversity.

In 2016 to 2017, he served as Vice President for Asia-Pacific in the United Nations Environment Assembly (UNEA), the highest environment body of the United Nations.

Dr. Paje served as Secretary of the Department of Environment and Natural Resources (DENR), under President Benigno S. Aquino III, from 2010 to 2016.

As DENR Secretary, he implemented major programs and policy reforms which the present government continues to carry out up to this time, to wit:

Total Logging Ban in Natural Forest. This major policy reform stops the massive loss of forests caused by centuries of logging in the Philippines. It also engenders natural restoration of forestlands and biodiversity habitats.

National Greening Program. NGP significantly improves the country's forest cover, placing Philippines fifth in the world in terms of forest gain, as cited in the 2015 United Nations Forest Report. It also increases the productivity of forestlands thereby reducing poverty, especially in the uplands.

No New Mining Contracts. Pursuant to Executive Order No. 79, issued by President Aquino, this policy ensures that no additional agreements will bind the state for another 50 years after the expiration of existing Mineral Agreements.

Geohazard Mapping. The precise determination of flood-prone and landslide-prone areas in geohazard maps greatly enhances the country's disaster preparedness and saves lives. The Philippines is now 100% covered with geohazard maps.

Cadastral Survey. The Cadastral Survey Program which started in 1903, was only 46% complete in 2010. It was completed in six years by the Aquino administration, significantly arresting the country's growing land conflicts.

Also, Secretary Paje implemented various reforms in environment and biodiversity protection and ecosystems research, including the upgrading of the country's fuel standard from Euro 2 to Euro 4, the expansion of national protected areas and the establishment of mechanized nurseries and research centers nationwide, among others.

He also vigorously pursued the Philippine claim to the Benham Rise (now Philippine Rise), with the strong efforts of the National Mapping and Resource Information Authority (NAMRIA) and other agencies, particularly the Department of Foreign Affairs (DFA). The United Nations approved/confirmed said claim on April 12, 2012.

Secretary Paje signed for the Republic of the Philippines the historic Paris Agreement on Climate Change on April 22, 2016, at the UN Headquarters in New York, with world leaders and other environment ministers. The Philippines, as one of the most vulnerable countries in the world, committed to bring down its emission by 70% based on 2030 projections.

Government offices
| Preceded by Horacio Ramos | Secretary of Environment and Natural Resources; 2010 – 2016 | Succeeded by Gina Lopez; Ad interim |
