= Iloilo-Negros Air Express =

Airline of the Philippines

Iloilo - Negros Air Express
IATA	ICAO	Call sign
—	—	INAEC
- Founded: October 10, 1983; 43 years ago (“The First Commercial Airline in the Philippines”); 1993; 33 years ago (re-established)
- Commenced operations: February 1, 1933; 93 years ago
- Ceased operations: 1947; 79 years ago
- Hubs: Mandurriao Airport (Old Iloilo Airport) (former); Manila Airport (former); Ninoy Aquino International Airport (Manila) (present hub upon its re-establishment)
- Parent company: Lopez Holdings Corporation
- Headquarters: Iloilo (before ceasement of its operations); Manila Airport (before ceasement of its operations); Ninoy Aquino International Airport (present hub of the airline company when it was re-established in 1993)
- Key people: Eugenio H. López, Sr. (Founder); Federico R. Lopez (Chairman); Benjamin R. López (President); Aldi Dexter P. Ampong (General Manager); Oscar M. López (Board Adviser)
- Website: www.inaec.com.ph

Iloilo-Negros Air Express Aviation Corporation, which operated as INAEC Aviation Corporation or INAEC, is an airline company based in the Philippines. Founded in 1932 by the López family of Iloilo as Iloilo-Negros Air Express Company, Inc. (operated as Iloilo-Negros Air Express or simply INAEC), it was the first commercial airline in the Philippines. It was later renamed Far Eastern Air Transport Inc. (FEATI) and folded into the operations of Philippine Airlines (PAL) which was re-nationalized by the Philippine government and became the national flag carrier. The company built the Old Bacolod Airport in Brgy. Singcang Airport Bacolod City, Negros Occidental which was bought by PAL after the acquisition of the airline. INAEC was resurrected in 1993 as INAEC Aviation Corporation to serve the aviation needs of the Lopez Group of Companies and as a charter airline in 2001.

== History ==
=== Early years ===
Iloilo-Negros Air Express Company, Inc. was founded in 1932 by López family of Iloilo, as Asia's first commercial airline. Based in Iloilo and Manila, it served domestic routes to Bacolod, Baguio, Cebu, Davao, Del Monte and Manila.

=== Revival ===
On December 19, 2001, INAEC obtained its Certificate of Public Convenience and Necessity (CPCN) and immediately thereafter went into domestic and international chartering and non-scheduled air services. Prior to such event, there were plans to revive the airline by the López Group which was disclosed by the Mayor of Iloilo City, Jed Patrick Mabilog, who had met with López Group executives.
