= Manila Chronicle =

Defunct Philippine daily newspaper

- Type: Daily newspaper
- Format: Broadsheet
- Owner: Manila Chronicle Publishing Corporation
- Founded: 1945; 81 years ago 1986; 40 years ago
- Ceased publication: September 23, 1972; 53 years ago (Martial law) 1998; 28 years ago
- Political alignment: Social Liberal
- Language: English
- Headquarters: Pasig, Metro Manila, Philippines
- City: Manila
- Country: Philippines

The Manila Chronicle was a newspaper in the Philippines founded in 1945. Its founding newspapermen sold it to Eugenio López, Sr. It was closed down when martial law was imposed by Ferdinand Marcos in 1972. It was published daily by the Manila Chronicle Publishing Corporation, with Rodrigo Apoderado as chief editor. It was re-opened in 1986 but was closed down in 1998 after a labor dispute.

== See also ==
- Manila Chronicle building
- ABS-CBN, former sister company
- Sinar Harapan - A newspaper in Indonesia that has been also forcefully closed down by the government.
