= Fernando Lopez =

Vice President of the Philippines from 1949 to 1953 and 1965 to 1972

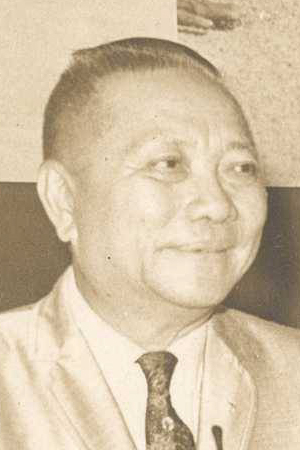
- Lopez in c. 1965

3rd and 7th Vice President of the Philippines
- In office December 30, 1965 – September 23, 1972
- President: Ferdinand Marcos
- Preceded by: Emmanuel Pelaez
- Succeeded by: Office abolished (next held by Salvador Laurel, 1986)
- In office December 30, 1949 – December 30, 1953
- President: Elpidio Quirino
- Preceded by: Elpidio Quirino
- Succeeded by: Carlos P. Garcia

Secretary of Agriculture and Natural Resources
- In office December 30, 1965 – January 15, 1971
- President: Ferdinand Marcos
- Preceded by: Jose Feliciano
- Succeeded by: Arturo Tanco Jr.
- In office September 14, 1950 – May 26, 1953
- President: Elpidio Quirino
- Preceded by: Plácido Mapa
- Succeeded by: Plácido Mapa

President pro tempore of the Senate of the Philippines
- In office January 27, 1958 – December 30, 1965
- Preceded by: Manuel Briones
- Succeeded by: Lorenzo Sumulong

Senator of the Philippines
- In office December 30, 1953 – December 30, 1965
- In office December 30, 1947 – December 30, 1949

Mayor of Iloilo City
- Acting
- In office September 26, 1945 – December 30, 1947
- Appointed by: Sergio Osmeña
- Preceded by: Mariano Benedicto
- Succeeded by: Vicente Ybiernas

Chairman of ABS-CBN (Broadcasting) Corporation
- In office February 28, 1986 – May 26, 1993
- Preceded by: Eugenio López Sr.
- Succeeded by: Eugenio Lopez Jr.

Personal details
- Born: Fernando Hofileña Lopez; April 13, 1904 Jaro, Iloilo, Philippine Islands
- Died: May 26, 1993 (aged 89) Iloilo City, Philippines
- Party: Nacionalista (1945–1946, 1957–1993)
- Other political affiliations: Democratic (1953–1957); Liberal (1946–1953)
- Spouse: Maria Salvacion Javellana
- Children: 6
- Parents: Benito Lopez; Presentacion Hofileña
- Education: University of Santo Tomas (LL.B)
- Occupation: Politician
- Profession: Lawyer

Fernando "Nanding" Hofileña Lopez Sr. KGCR (April 13, 1904 – May 26, 1993) was a Filipino statesman. A member of the influential López family of Iloilo, he served as vice president of the Philippines under Presidents Elpidio Quirino from 1949 to 1953 under the Liberal Party and Ferdinand Marcos from 1965 to 1972, under the Nacionalista Party. He was also the chairman of ABS-CBN Corporation from 1986 to his death in 1993.

== Early life and career ==
Lopez was born on April 13, 1904, in Jaro, Iloilo City to Benito Villanueva Lopez and Presentacion Javelona Hofileña. He was the younger brother and only sibling of Eugenio Lopez Sr. The Lopez family was the richest and most influential family in the province.

Lopez studied high school at Colegio de San Juan de Letran, finishing in 1921. He studied law in the University of Santo Tomas, earning his Bachelor of Laws degree in 1925. After passing the bar examinations, he did not go into private practice, but helped his older brother manage the family business.

In 1945, with no prior political experience, Lopez was chosen by President Sergio Osmeña to be mayor of Iloilo City. In 1947, he ran for senator and won.

Lopez was one of the founders of University of Iloilo and the FEATI University in Manila.

The brothers Eugenio and Fernando owned the Iloilo-Negros Air Express Company (the first Filipino owned air service), the Iloilo Times (El Tiempo), the Manila Chronicle, and ABS-CBN Corporation.

== Vice-presidency ==
=== First term (1949–1953) ===
In 1949, Lopez became vice-president under President Elpidio Quirino and concurrently worked as secretary of agriculture, serving until 1953. He was then elected once again as senator, and re-elected in 1959.

=== Second and third term (1965–1972) ===
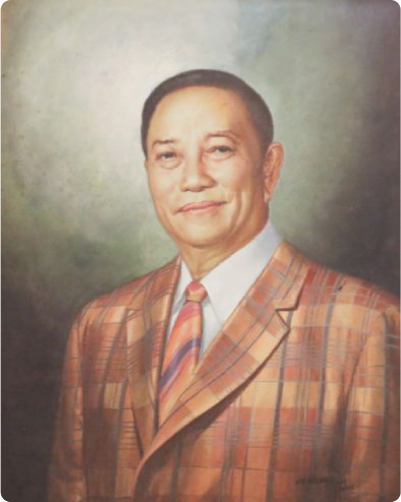
Vice President Fernando H. Lopez Official Portrait

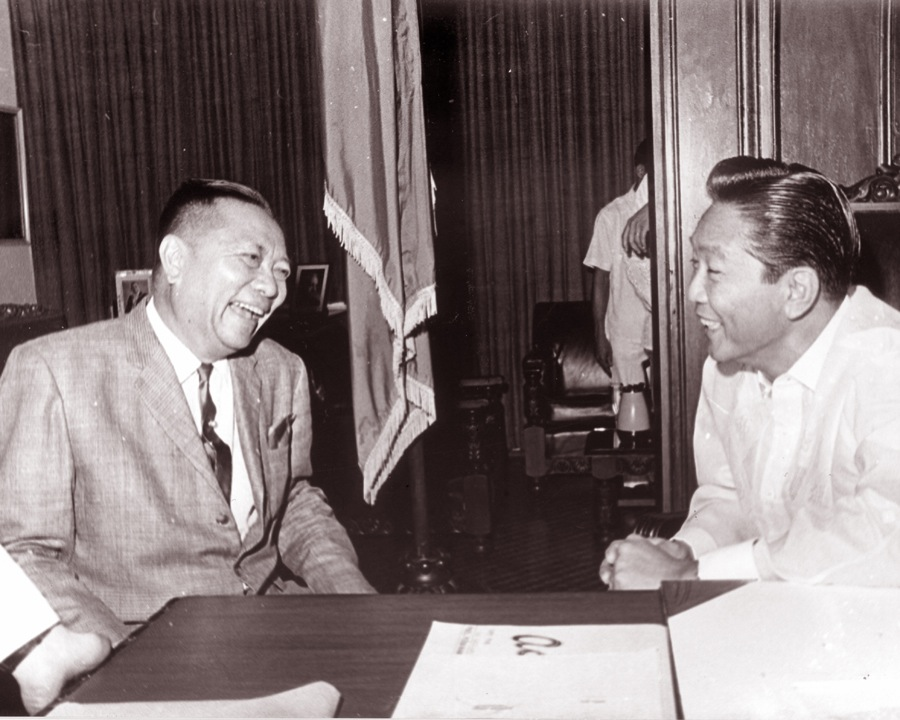
Vice President Fernando Lopez with President Ferdinand Marcos at the Presidential study.

In 1965, Lopez ran with Ferdinand Marcos and won as vice president. He was re-elected in 1969, making him to date the only vice president to serve two non-consecutive terms, with two different presidents and from different parties. By the time martial law was declared in 1972, the Lopez family fell out of Marcos' favor and was targeted by the regime because of their denunciations of Marcos. The office of vice president was abolished, and the Lopez family was stripped of most of its political and economic assets.

== Later life and death ==
After the removal of Marcos from power as a result of the People Power Revolution of 1986, Lopez became chairman of FHL Investment Corporation and vice-chairman of First Philippine Holdings Corporation.

He died on May 26, 1993, a month after his 89th birthday, leaving behind his wife Mariquit Javellana with whom he had six children: Yolanda, Fernando Jr. (Junjie), Alberto (Albertito), Emmanuele, Benito and Mita. He was the longest living vice president until he was surpassed by Teofisto Guingona Jr. in 2017.

== Electoral history ==
Electoral history of Fernando Lopez
Year	Office	Party	Votes received				Result
Year	Office	Party	Total	%	P.	Swing	Result
1947	Senator of the Philippines	Liberal	1,543,830	47.29%	5th	—N/a	Won
1953	Senator of the Philippines	Democratic	2,272,642	52.53%	1st	—N/a	Won
1959	Senator of the Philippines	Nacionalista	2,366,166	37.01%	3rd	—N/a	Won
1949	Vice President of the Philippines	Liberal	1,741,302	51.67%	1st	—N/a	Won
1965	Vice President of the Philippines	Nacionalista	3,531,550	48.48%	1st	—N/a	Won
1969	Vice President of the Philippines	Nacionalista	5,001,737	62.75%	1st	—N/a	Won

== Honors and awards ==
- : The Order of the Knights of Rizal, Knight Grand Cross of Rizal (KGCR).

Business positions
Preceded by Eugenio Lopez Sr.	ABS-CBN Corporation Chairman; 1986 – 1993	Succeeded by Eugenio Lopez Jr.
Political offices
Vacant Title last held by Elpidio Quirino	Vice President of the Philippines; 1949–1953	Succeeded by Carlos P. García
Preceded by Emmanuel Pelaez	Vice President of the Philippines; 1965–1972	Vacant Office abolished; due to martial law Title next held by Salvador Laurel
