= Lopez Holdings Corporation =

Filipino conglomerate and holding company

- Lopez Holdings Corporation's logo used since July 21, 2010
- Formerly: Benpres Holdings Corporation (1993–2019) (Note: The Benpres name was used as primary name from June 8, 1993 to July 21, 2010, and secondary from July 21, 2010 until the demolition of Benpres Building in 2019.)
- Type: Public
- Traded as: PSE: LPZ
- Industry: Various (conglomerate)
- Founded: June 8, 1993; 33 years ago
- Founder: Eugenio Lopez, Sr. and Fernando Lopez, Sr.
- Headquarters: 4/F Benpres Building, Exchange Road cor. Meralco Ave., Ortigas Center, Pasig City, Metro Manila, Philippines (1993–2019); 16/F North Tower, Rockwell Business Center Sheridan, Sheridan corner United Sts., Bgy. Highway Hills, Mandaluyong, Metro Manila, Philippines (2019–present)
- Area served: Worldwide
- Key people: Federico R. Lopez (Chairman and Chief Executive Officer); Martin L. Lopez (Vice-Chairman); Salvador Tirona (President, CCO and CFO)
- Revenue: ▼PHP 107.28 billion (2020)
- Operating income: ▼PHP 18.07 billion (2020)
- Net income: ▼PHP 13.18 billion (2020)
- Total assets: ▲PHP 401.5 billion (2023)
- Total equity: ▲PHP 201.02 billion (2020)
- Parent: Lopez, Inc. (54.44%)
- Subsidiaries: ABS-CBN Corporation; Manila Electric Company (3.95% interest); First Philippine Holdings Corporation; First Gen Corporation; First Philec Corporation; First Philippine Industrial Park; Rockwell Land Corporation
- Website: lopezlink.ph www.lopez-holdings.ph

López Holdings Corporation (formerly primarily as Benpres Holdings Corporation from June 8, 1993 to July 21, 2010 and secondarily from July 21, 2010 to 2019 and also known as Lopez Group of Companies) is a Filipino multinational conglomerate company based on Mandaluyong, Metro Manila, Philippines founded by the brothers Eugenio López, Sr. and Fernando López, Sr. It has substantial holdings in the public service and utilities sector in the Philippines and serves as the López family's publicly listed holding company for investments in major development sectors such as broadcasting and cable; telecommunications; power generation and distribution; manufacturing; and property development. It added to its portfolio investments in other basic service sectors but has also since sold its interest in banking, toll roads, information technology, and health care delivery.

López Holdings Corporation is majority-owned by López, Inc., a private holding and investment entity of the López family and businessman Ramon Ang. It was formerly headquartered in Pasig until the demolition of Benpres Building, when it moved its operations to Mandaluyong in 2019.

== Businesses ==
=== Media and Telecommunications ===
- ABS-CBN Corporation (also known as ABS-CBN Broadcasting/ABS-CBN Broadcasting Corporation, ABS-CBN Corporate, ABS-CBN Group, ABS-CBN, Inc. and "its parent company" or "its parent" in referring to the namesake media network at the terms and conditions of websites of the media company's sectors, and shortened to ABS-CBN Broadcasting Corp., ABS-CBN Corp., or simply as ABS-CBN) (Note: On August 21, 2007, the company began to use the ABS-CBN Corporation name to reflect its diversification with ABS-CBN Broadcasting Corporation name is still used on some uses as such both names are now alternatively used since then.) - a publicly listed company and the country's largest media company. It is currently involved in broadcast radio, television and new media as well as cable television, television programming, films, theater, news, publishing, talent agency, licensing, radio, music, merchandise, events and concerts, streaming platforms, digital media and websites. Lopez Holdings owns 57.24% of the company as of 2014.
  - List of ABS-CBN Corporation subsidiaries, Template:ABS-CBN Corporation, and ABS-CBN - lists of sectors of the media company with the last also the namesake media network which was formerly the free-to-air-channel from October 23, 1953 to September 23, 1972 and September 14, 1986 to May 5, 2020.
  - List of real estate properties owned by ABS-CBN - current and former real estate properties currently and were formerly used on the company's operations.
  - Kapamilya Channel - the company's flagship television channel that launched on June 13, 2020 (the company's 74th anniversary) which replaced the free-to-air ABS-CBN which was signed off on May 5, 2020 due to non-renewal of franchise with it affiliated with blocktime channels: A2Z under ZOE Broadcasting Network and other networks and platforms, including AMBS' All TV. Its contents are available worldwide through The Filipino Channel (TFC).
  - Sky Vision Corporation - is a holding company incorporated on March 25, 1991, with the primary purpose of owning controlling stocks on Sky Cable Corporation. It started commercial operations on February 1, 1992. It is owned 55% by ABS-CBN Corporation, 5% by Lopez Holdings Corporation and 40% by Sampaquita Communications Pte. Ltd. Sky Cable acquired Destiny Cable in 2012.
- Adtel Inc.

=== Power and Energy ===
- First Philippine Holdings Corporation (First Holdings) - a holding company whose core businesses are in power generation and distribution, with strategic initiatives in manufacturing, property and infrastructure. Lopez holdings owns 46.6% of FPHC as of December 2011.

==== Power Generation ====
- First Gen Corporation (First Gen) - is the holding company of First Holdings in power generation and energy-related businesses. First Holdings owns 76% of First Gen.
- First Gas Holdings Corporation (FGHC) - established in 1994 as a joint-venture between First Holdings and the BG Group to develop natural gas projects in the Philippines using natural gas from the Malampaya gas field. FGHC is now a wholly owned subsidiary of First Gen acquiring the 40% interest of BG Group in 2012.
- First Gas Power Corporation (FGPC) - established in 1994 as a joint-venture between First Holdings and the BG Group to operate a 1,000 MW combined cycle gas turbine power plant in Santa Rita, Batangas. In May 2012, First Gen acquired the 40% interest of the BG Group, making FGPC an indirect wholly owned subsidiary of First Gen.
- FGP Corporation (FGP) - established in 1997 as a joint-venture between First Holdings and the BG Group to operate a 500 MW gas turbine combined cycle power plant in San Lorenzo, Batangas. In May 2012, First Gen acquired the 40% interest of the BG Group, making FGPC an indirect wholly owned subsidiary of First Gen.
- FGP San Gabriel is a 420 MW combined cycle gas turbine plant which was established in 2016 as an indirect wholly owned subsidiary of First Gen.
- FG Hydro Power Corporation - First Gen Hydro Power Corporation (FG Hydro) was incorporated as a wholly owned subsidiary of First Gen.
- FG Bukidnon Power Corporation
- First Gen Renewables, Inc. (FGRI), formerly known as First Philippine Energy Corporation, was established in 1978 to develop prospects in the renewable energy market. First Gen owns 100% of FGRI.
- Energy Development Corporation - established in 1976, accounts for more than 60% of the country’s installed geothermal capacity. Its plants are located in the provinces of Leyte, Negros Oriental, Negros Occidental, Bicol and North Cotobato. In November 2007, First Gen Corporation bid for and won a 60-percent economic stake in EDC. As of 2011 First Gen owns over 46% of EDC.

==== Power Distribution ====
- Manila Electric Company (Meralco) - acquired by the Lopez Group 1962 and developed into a power-distributing company. Between 2009 and 2012, the Lopez Group would reduce its 33.4% holdings in MERALCO by selling most of its shares to the First Pacific Group. Since 2012, the Lopez Group's maintains a 3.95% interest (one board seat) in MERALCO.
- Panay Electric Company (PECO) - First Holdings entered into a joint venture with the Panay Electric Company, Inc. (PECO) in March 1996 for the construction of a US 72 million diesel-fired power plant in Iloilo City. First Holdings acquired a 30 percent equity in PECO. In turn, PECO subscribed to a 30 percent equity interest in Panay Power Corporation. First Holdings currently owns 30% of PECO.

=== Real estate ===
- Rockwell Land Corporation (RLC) - a high-end real estate development corporation initially tasked to develop the Rockwell Center in Makati. Rockwell Land was established in 1995. FPHC now owns 85% of Rockwell Land after buying the shares of MPIC and SMC groups in Rockwell Land.
- First Philippine Industrial Park (FPIP) - a 315-hectare industrial estate. FPIP is a joint venture with Sumitomo Corporation of Japan which owns 30% while First Holdings owns 70%, formed in 1996 to develop an industrial park located in Sto. Tomas, Batangas.
- First Philippine Realty Corporation, formerly known as INAEC Development Corporation - primarily engaged in the acquisition, disposal, or lease of real and personal property. FPRC is a wholly owned subsidiary of First Holdings.
- TerraPrime Inc. - incorporated in May 2011 as a joint-venture between First Balfour and Estuar Development Corporation. The company is engaged in real estate development.
- Alabang Town Center

=== Infrastructure ===
- First Balfour, Inc. - is one of the country’s largest engineering, construction, and contractor company both for Lopez Holdings' current and former divisions and subsidiaries, and non Lopez-owned third-party companies today with 49 years in business. First Balfour, Inc. is a wholly owned subsidiary of First Philippine Holdings.
- First Philippine Industrial Corporation- owns and operates the sole, largest commercial oil pipeline in the country, transporting crude and refined petroleum products from Batangas to Metro Manila. FPIC is 60% owned by First Holdings, in partnership with Shell Petroleum Co., Ltd. (UK) which owns 40%.

=== Manufacturing ===
- First Philippine Electric Corporation (First Philec)
- Philippine Electric Corporation (Philec)
- First Electro Dynamics Corporation (FEDCOR)
- First Philippine Power Systems, Inc. (FPPS)
- First Sumiden Circuits, Inc. (FSCI)
- First Sumiden Realty, Inc.
- First Philec Solar Corporation

== Other businesses of the Lopez Group ==
- Asian Eye Institute
- Securities Transfer Services Inc. (STSI)
- INAEC Aviation Corporation

== Former businesses ==
- Bayan Telecommunications Holdings Corporation (Bayan Holdings) - one of the telecommunications company in the Philippines providing a full range of services which includes local exchange, domestic long distance, international long distance, data and payphone services. As of May 2011, Lopez Holdings held 47.3% Bayan Holdings. In 2013, Ayala-led Globe Telecom took over 98% of BayanTel via a debt to equity deal.
- Maynilad Water Services - joint-venture between Lopez Holdings Corporation and Ondeo Water Services, Inc. (formerly Suez Lyonnaise de Eaux). Lopez left the joint-venture in 2006 in order to settle a debt of US$150 million.
- The Medical City - in April 2008, Lopez Holdings sold its entire 18% stake in The Medical City to Lombard for Php600 million.
- NLEX Corporation - sold to Metro Pacific Investments Corporation in August 2008.
- Philippine Commercial International Bank (PCI Bank) - a joint venture between Lopez and JG Summit Holdings of the Gokongwei family. In 1999, both groups sold their shares in the bank to SSS and GSIS. The shares were later acquired by and merged with Equitable Bank resulting to the renaming of the merged entity into Equitable PCI Bank. Seven years later in 2005, SM Investments would acquire Equitable PCI Bank and merged it in 2007 with its Banco de Oro which eventually took the name BDO Unibank.
