= Bayan Telecommunications =

Telecommunications company in the Philippines

Bayan Telecommunications Inc.
- Type: Subsidiary
- Industry: Communications Services
- Founded: 1986; 40 years ago
- Headquarters: Quezon City, Philippines
- Area served: Philippines
- Products: Fixed-Line Telephony; Wireless Telephony; Broadband Internet
- Revenue: ₱3.02 Billion (2016)
- Net income: ₱369 Million
- Parent: Lopez Holdings (1986-2015); Globe (2015-present)
- Subsidiaries: Radio Communications of the Philippines (RCPI) (91%); Telecoms Infrastructure Corp. of the Philippines (TICP) (57.91%); Sky Internet (100%); Globetel Japan (100%); NDTN Land (70.36%)

Bayan Telecommunications Inc. (BayanTel) is a telecommunications company headquartered in Quezon City, Philippines, serving areas in Metro Manila, Bicol, and local exchange service areas in the Visayas and Mindanao regions combined, cover a population of over 25 million, nearly 33% of the population of the Philippines. BayanTel is now a subsidiary of Globe Telecom.

BayanTel is also a provider of data and communications services such as dedicated domestic and international leased lines, frame relay services, Internet access, and other managed data services like Digital Subscriber Lines (DSL).

BayanTel logo used from 1986 to 2008

== History ==
BayanTel was the operating arm of BTHC and formerly known as International Communications Corporation (ICC). It was incorporated on April 18, 1961 and is based in the United States.

BayanTel is duly enfranchised to provide the following major telecommunications services:

- Local Exchange Carrier (LEC) service
- International Gateway Facility (IGF) service;
- Leased Line service, domestic and international
- Public Trunk Radio service
- Public Calling Office service

BayanTel's existing nationwide network is composed of satellite, terrestrial and land/submarine based cable facilities. The network includes capacities in the National Digital Transmission Network (NDTN), a joint project of six Philippine telecommunications carriers.

BayanTel has 83% capacity interest in the NDTN project. The NDTN is the only major alternative telecommunications backbone in the Philippines, the other being operated by PLDT. The network also includes RCPI's existing Synchronous Digital Hierarchy (SDH) microwave network with spur links that also extends from Luzon to Mindanao. Both BayanTel and RCPI's networks are linked together to form a seamless system, and fiber optic cable networks.

== Ownership, structure and affiliates ==
BTHC is 85.4% owned by the Lopez Group of Companies, a publicly listed holding company owning the Lopez Group’s investments in communications, power, infrastructure and real estate, among others.

Other main shareholders of the company is the AIF. AIF is advised by AIFML which oversees approximately US$1 billion in private equity funds focused on Asia with 46% investment in telecoms. Major investors of AIF include Frank Russell Company of the United States, the International Finance Corporation of the World Bank and the Asian Development Bank.

The principal companies under BTHC are BTI (98% owned) and Marifil Holdings Corporation (100% owned) which in turn owns 47% of Extelcom and Nagatel (91.5% owned).

Extelcom, through the granting of a PA in 1988 and a CPCN in 1993, operates as an analog cellular service provider in Metro Manila and selected urban centers in the provinces, from northern Luzon to as far south as Visayas and Mindanao.

BTHC purchased its initial interest in Extelcom for approximately US$140.0 million in 1996. It then infused PhP765.5 million as part of a capital-raising exercise undertaken by Extelcom in 1997. No further investments or advances have been made by BTHC since. On June 30, 1999, BTHC decided to write-off its investment in Extelcom in recognition of its share in losses incurred by the latter.

=== Takeover by Globe Telecom ===
Globe Telecom, the country's largest telecommunications company, successfully acquired BayanTel through a debt purchase deal. Through Globe's acquisition of 96.17% of the company's debt, Globe is expected to become its largest investor and shareholder through conversion of its debt to equity.

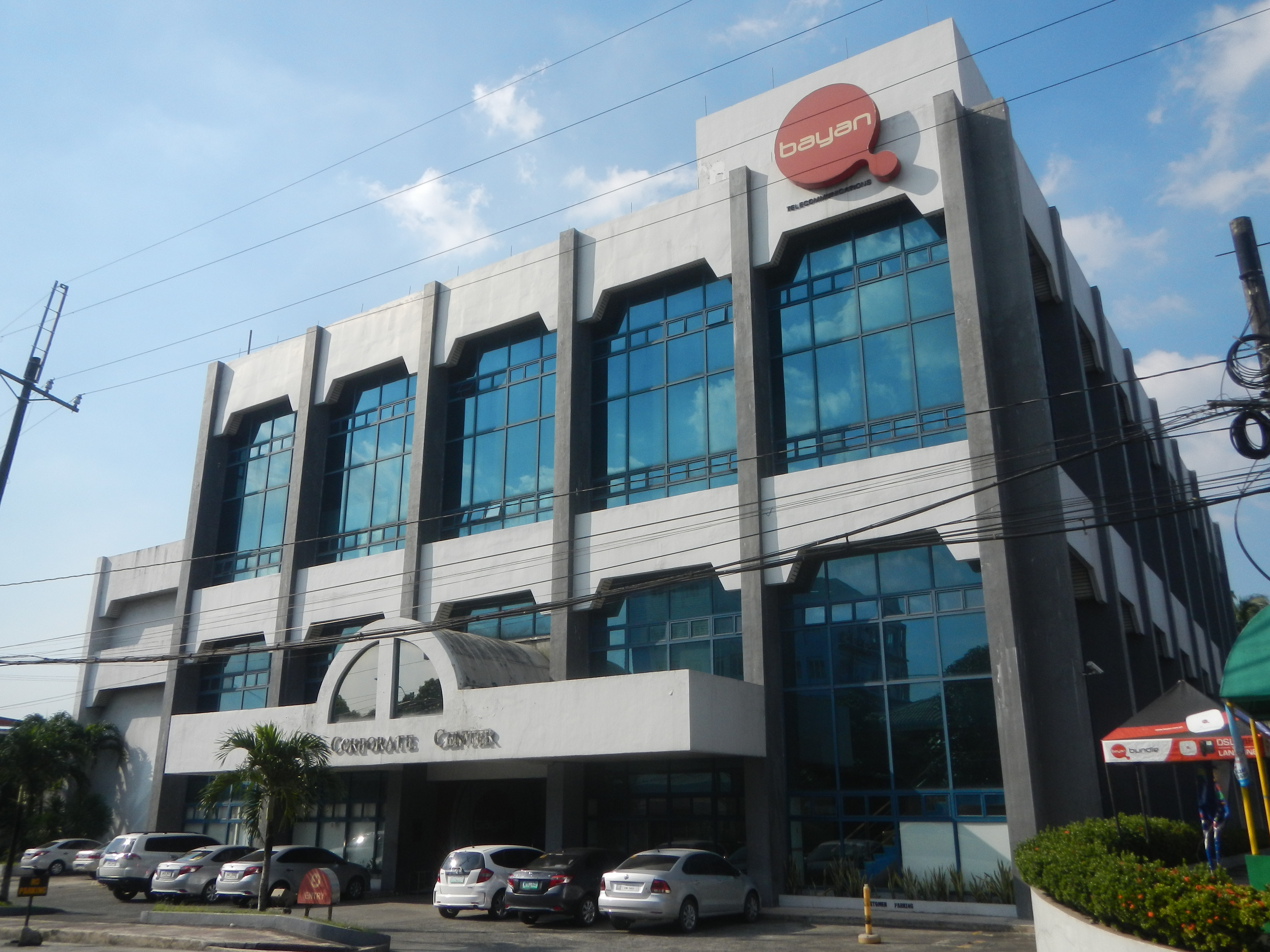
BayanTel Kalayaan Avenue

Following Globe Telecom’s tender offer for Bayan's debt in 2012, Globe Telecom held 96.5% of the total debt of Bayan at the end of that year. As proposed, restructuring would decrease the outstanding principal debt of Bayan from US$423.3 million to US$131.3 million, through the conversion of up to 69% of Bayan debt into Bayan shares.

By converting some of Bayan debt to Bayan equity, Globe eventually increased its percentage of ownership to 38% of Bayan as of the end of 2013. A change in control of Bayan required regulatory approval with the NTC. The controlling interest of Lopez Holdings over Bayan through BTHC went down from 86% as of end-2012 to 59% as of end-2013.

By 2015, 98.57% of shares of Bayan had been successfully acquired by Globe Telecom. By December 2015, Globe completed the billing and its wired network operations, and successfully integrated the Bayan brand. As of January 2026, Bayan, including its subsidiaries, is virtually retired in the market despite the corporate entity appearing in the conglomerate map of Globe Telecom.

== Services ==
- Wireless Landline
  - Bayan Phone
- Telephone Service
  - International Long Distance
  - SkyInternet VoIP
  - Domestic Long Distance
- Value Added Services
  - Caller ID
- Phone Cards
  - AffordaCall
- Internet Services
  - BayanDSL
- Prepaid Internet Services
  - Bl@st
