= First Philippine Holdings Corporation =

Philippine energy company

- Type: Public
- Traded as: PSE: FPH
- Industry: Power, manufacturing, property
- Founded: June 30, 1961; 65 years ago
- Headquarters: Pasig, Philippines
- Key people: Federico Rufino Lopez (Chairman and CEO); Francis Giles B. Puno (President and COO)
- Revenue: ▼PH₱107.28 billion (FY 2020)
- Operating income: ▼PH₱25.69 billion (FY 2020)
- Net income: ▼PH₱20.80 billion (FY 2020)
- Total assets: ▲PH₱385.64 billion (FY 2020)
- Total equity: ▲PH₱188.99 billion (FY 2020)
- Number of employees: 86
- Subsidiaries: Manila Electric Company; First Gen Corporation; First Philippine Electric Corporation; First Philippine Industrial Park; Rockwell Land Corporation
- Website: www.fphc.com

First Philippine Holdings Corporation (FPH; formerly Meralco Securities Corporation) is a management and investment company whose major business is power generation and distribution, including strategic initiatives in manufacturing and property development. Founded by Eugenio López Sr. in 1961 to acquire the securities of Meralco from the American-owned General Public Utilities, the FPH is a member of the Lopez Group of Companies.

Its power generation subsidiary, First Gen Corporation (First Gen), is a renewable energy producer, with power plants that use geothermal, hydro, and natural gas for fuel. Today, it has a total installed capacity of 2,832.6 MW, or 18.2% of the country's total installed capacity. First Gen manages the world's second largest geothermal power producer, Energy Development Corporation, which searches for indigenous, low-carbon energy alternatives.

FPH's manufacturing subsidiary, First Philippine Electric Corporation (First Philec), operates the country's first large-scale silicon wafer-slicing facility called First Philec Solar Corporation (FPSC), which supplies some of the world's photovoltaic companies. FPSC is a joint venture of First Philec and SunPower Corporation, in the solar industry.

First Holdings has strategic investments in property through Rockwell Land Corporation and First Philippine Industrial Park. The project is a joint venture with Sumitomo Corporation.

FPH maintains its corporate headquarters at Rockwell Business Center Tower 3 in Ortigas Center at Pasig, Philippines.
