= Eugenio López Sr. =

Filipino journalist and broadcaster (1901–1975)

Eugenio H. López Sr.

Chairman, Chronicle Broadcasting Network/Bolinao Electronics Corporation/ABS-CBN (Broadcasting) Corporation
- In office September 24, 1956 – September 22, 1972
- Preceded by: Antonio Quirino (1952–1957; as Chairman of Alto Broadcasting System, later merged with Chronicle Broadcasting Network); James Lindenberg (Bolinao Electronics Corporation)
- Succeeded by: Fernando López (reopened ABS-CBN)

Personal details
- Born: Eugenio Hofileña López; July 20, 1901 Jaro, Iloilo City, Philippine Islands
- Died: July 5, 1975 (aged 73) San Francisco, California, U.S.
- Resting place: Manila Memorial Park – Sucat, Paranaque, Philippines
- Spouse: Pacita Moreno
- Children: Eugenio M. López Jr. Oscar M. López; Presentación M. López-Psinakis; Manuel M. López; Roberto M. López
- Parents: Benito López; Presentación Hofileña
- Occupation: Journalist, broadcaster

Eugenio "Eñing" Hofileña López Sr. (Tagalog: [juˈhɛnjo ˈlɔpɛs]; July 20, 1901 – July 5, 1975) was a leading business figure in the Philippines. He was the founder of López Group of Companies. He belonged to the prominent López family of Iloilo, one of the leading political families in the Philippines.

== Personal life ==
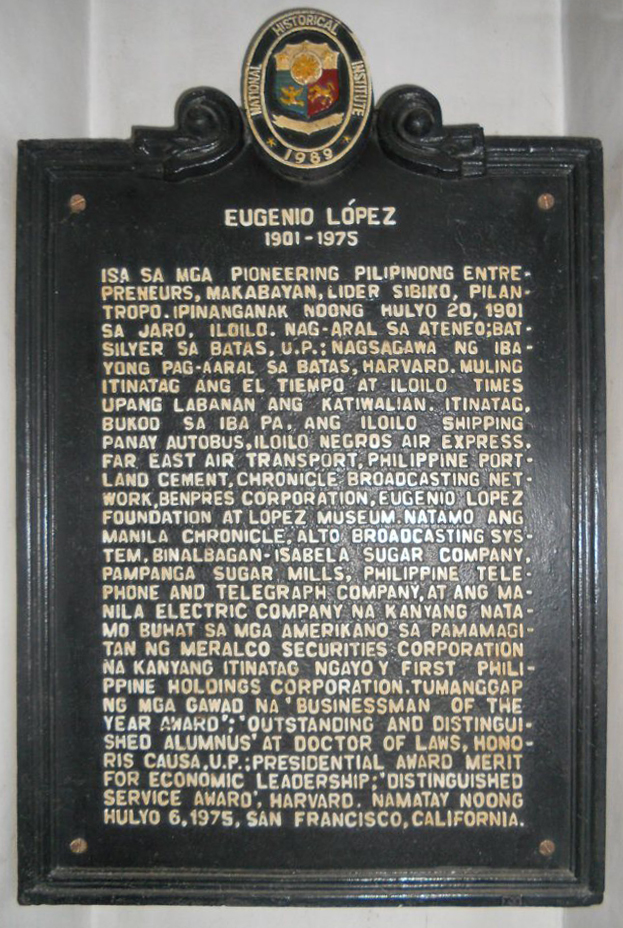
National historical marker for López that used to be at the Benpres Building in Pasig City

López was born on July 20, 1901, in Jaro, Iloilo City. His parents were Benito Villanueva López, a former governor of Iloilo, and Presentación Javelona Hofileña. He was the older brother and only sibling of former Philippine Vice President Fernando López. He received his education at the Ateneo de Manila where he graduated in 1919, and later the original campus of the University of the Philippines in Manila, where he took up law and graduated in 1923. He earned his master of laws degree from Harvard University.

He was the first president, or "charter president", of the Rotary Club of Iloilo, the third oldest Rotary Club in the Philippines. His family residence in Iloilo City known as the Lopez Boat House, built in 1935, was declared a National Heritage House by the National Historical Commission in 2002.

== Career ==
López began as a provincial bus operator, and eventually became chairman of ABS-CBN Broadcasting Corporation, the Philippine's largest media conglomerate, and president of the Manila Electric Company (Meralco). In 1972 he accepted a Distinguished Service Award from the Harvard Business School, but several months later was compelled by President Ferdinand Marcos to sign over his shares in Meralco, was stripped of his holdings and forced into exile.

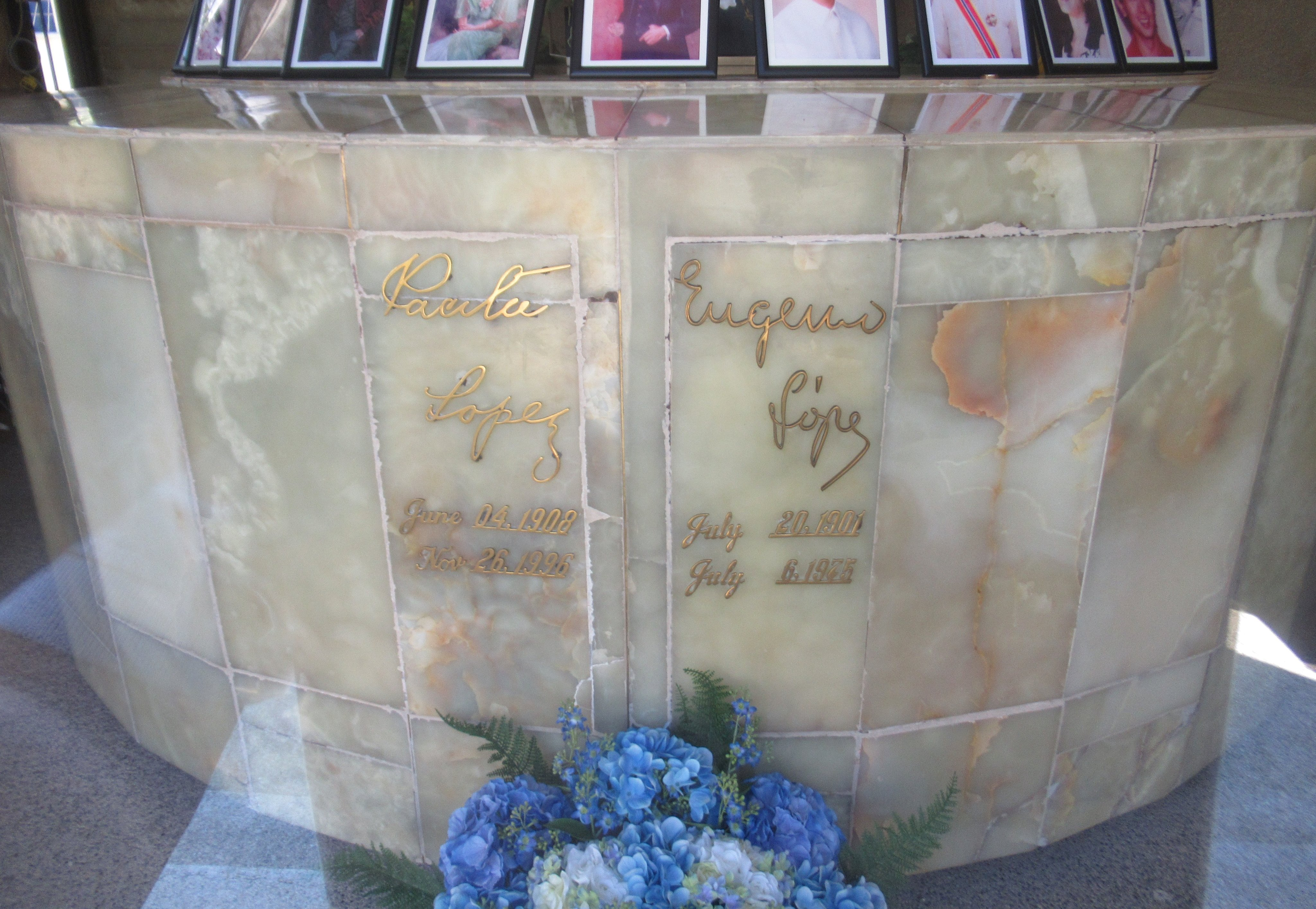
Pacita & López Sr.'s graves at Manila Memorial Park – Sucat.

== Death ==
López died of cancer on July 5, 1975.

== In popular culture ==
López was portrayed by Armando Goyena in the 1995 film Eskapo.

== See also ==
- Eugenio López Jr.
- Eugenio López III
- Fernando López

Preceded by Antonio Quirino (as Alto Broadcasting System)	Chronicle Broadcasting Network (now ABS-CBN Corporation) Chairman; September 24, 1956 – September 21, 1972	Succeeded by Roberto Benedicto (as BBC-2)
