= ABS-CBN Corporation =

Philippine media and entertainment company

- Current logo, the second version of the 1999 logo, used since September 7, 2013.

- The ELJ Communications Center in Diliman, Quezon City, the company's headquarters.
- Trade name: ABS-CBN; ABS-CBN Corporate; ABS-CBN Group; ABS-CBN Broadcasting; ABS-CBN, Inc. Kapamilya
- Formerly: Bolinao Electronics Corporation (1946–1952, 1957–1963); Alto Sales Corporation (1952–1957); Chronicle Broadcasting Network, Inc. (1956–1957)
- Type: Public
- Traded as: PSE: ABS
- Industry: Radio broadcasting Mass media Entertainment
- Founded: June 13, 1946; 80 years ago (first incarnation); September 14, 1986; 40 years ago (second incarnation; Post-People Power Revolution)
- Founders: James Lindenberg; Antonio Quirino; Eugenio López Sr.; Fernando López
- Defunct: September 23, 1972; 54 years ago (first incarnation; martial law)
- Headquarters: ELJ Communications Center, Eugenio Lopez Drive, Diliman, Quezon City, Metro Manila, Philippines
- Area served: Worldwide
- Key people: Martin "Mark" L. López (Chairman); Carlo L. Katigbak (President and CEO); Cory Vidanes (COO)
- Products: Films; Music; Television programs Web portals
- Brands: Kapamilya Channel; Kapamilya Online Live; A2Z (in partnership with ZOE); All TV (in partnership with AMBS); ABS-CBN TV Plus; DZMM/DZMM TeleRadyo (joint venture with Philippine Collective Media Corporation); MOR Entertainment; ANC; Cine Mo!; Jeepney TV; Cinema One; Metro Channel; Knowledge Channel; Myx; TFC; iWant; Yey! (programming block)
- Services: Broadcasting; Motion pictures; TV production; Cable television; Internet; Streaming service; Broadcast syndication; Record label; Telecommunications; Satellite television; Film distribution
- Revenue: ▼ ₱15.852 billion (FY 2025)
- Operating income: ▼ ₱−3.620 billion (FY 2025)
- Net income: ▼ ₱−4.717 billion (FY 2025)
- Total assets: ▼ ₱34.200 billion (FY 2025)
- Total equity: ▼ (₱66 million) (FY 2026 1st Quarter)
- Owners: Lopez Holdings Corporation (56.28%); ABS-CBN Holdings Corporation (32.21%); Public ownership (42.80%)
- Number of employees: 3,646 (FY 2025)
- Divisions: ABS-CBN Corporate Security and Safety; ABS-CBN Integrated Corporate Communications; ABS-CBN Film Productions, Inc.; ABS-CBN Center for Communication Arts, Inc./Showbiz Magic, Inc.; ABS-CBN Interactive, Inc.; ABS-CBN Publishing; ABS-CBN Studios; ABS-CBN Events; ABS-CBN Foundation; ABS-CBN International; ABS-CBN International Production and Co-Production; ABS-CBN Radio; ABS-CBN News; ABS-CBN Narrowcast; ABS-CBN Philharmonic Orchestra; MOR Entertainment; Star Recording, Inc.
- Subsidiaries: List of subsidiaries
- Website: www.abs-cbn.com (generic website) corporate.abs-cbn.com (main corporate website) governane.abs-cbn.com (Corporate Governance) investors.abs-cbn.com (Investor Relations)

ABS-CBN Corporation (Note: Also known as ABS-CBN Broadcasting/ABS-CBN Broadcasting Corporation, ABS-CBN Corporate, ABS-CBN Group, ABS-CBN, Inc., and "its parent company" or "its parent" in referring to the namesake media network at the terms and conditions of websites of the media company's sectors, and shortened to ABS-CBN Broadcasting Corp., ABS-CBN Corp., or simply as ABS-CBN. The name is a backronym of the formerly two separated companies Alto Broadcasting System – Chronicle Broadcasting Network.) is a Philippine media company based in Quezon City, Metro Manila, Philippines. It is the largest entertainment television and film production, program syndication provider, film distributor and media company in the Philippines. It is a subsidiary of Lopez Holdings Corporation, which is owned by the López family. ABS-CBN was formed by the merger of Alto Broadcasting System (ABS) and Chronicle Broadcasting Network (CBN). Aside from "Kapamilya" as the company's and namesake television network's metonym, it is also metonymically called "Ignacia" due to the location of its headquarters ELJ Communications Center along Mother Ignacia Street in Quezon City.

ABS was founded in 1946 by American electronics engineer James Lindenberg as Bolinao Electronics Corporation (BEC). In 1952, BEC was renamed Alto Broadcasting System (ABS) with its corporate name, Alto Sales Corporation after Judge Antonio Quirino, brother of President Elpidio Quirino, purchased the company and later launched the first TV station in the country, DZAQ-TV on October 23, 1953. The company that would later be merged with ABS to form ABS-CBN was founded in 1956 as Chronicle Broadcasting Network, Inc. (CBN) by Eugenio Lopez Sr. and his brother Fernando Lopez, who was the sitting Vice President of the Philippines. A year later, the Lopezes acquired ABS. The ABS-CBN brand was first used on television in 1961.

The company became known as ABS-CBN Broadcasting Corporation (or simply as ABS-CBN Broadcasting) from 1963 to September 23, 1972, and again since its relaunch on September 14, 1986. On August 21, 2007, the company began to use the ABS-CBN Corporation name to signify its diversification where both names are now alternatively used since then. The common shares of ABS-CBN were first traded on the Philippine Stock Exchange in July 1992 under the ticker symbol ABS.

Due to being denied another 25-year free-to-air broadcasting franchise by the Philippine Congress, the company now mainly focuses on working as a content company, which includes production and distribution of television programs, films and other entertainment material.

== History ==
The company was founded on June 13, 1946, as Bolinao Electronics Corporation (BEC). BEC was established by James Lindenberg, one of the founding fathers of Philippine television, an American electronics engineer who went into radio equipment assembly and radio broadcasting. In 1949, Lindenberg shifted Bolinao to radio broadcasting with DZBC and masterminded the introduction of television to the country in 1953.

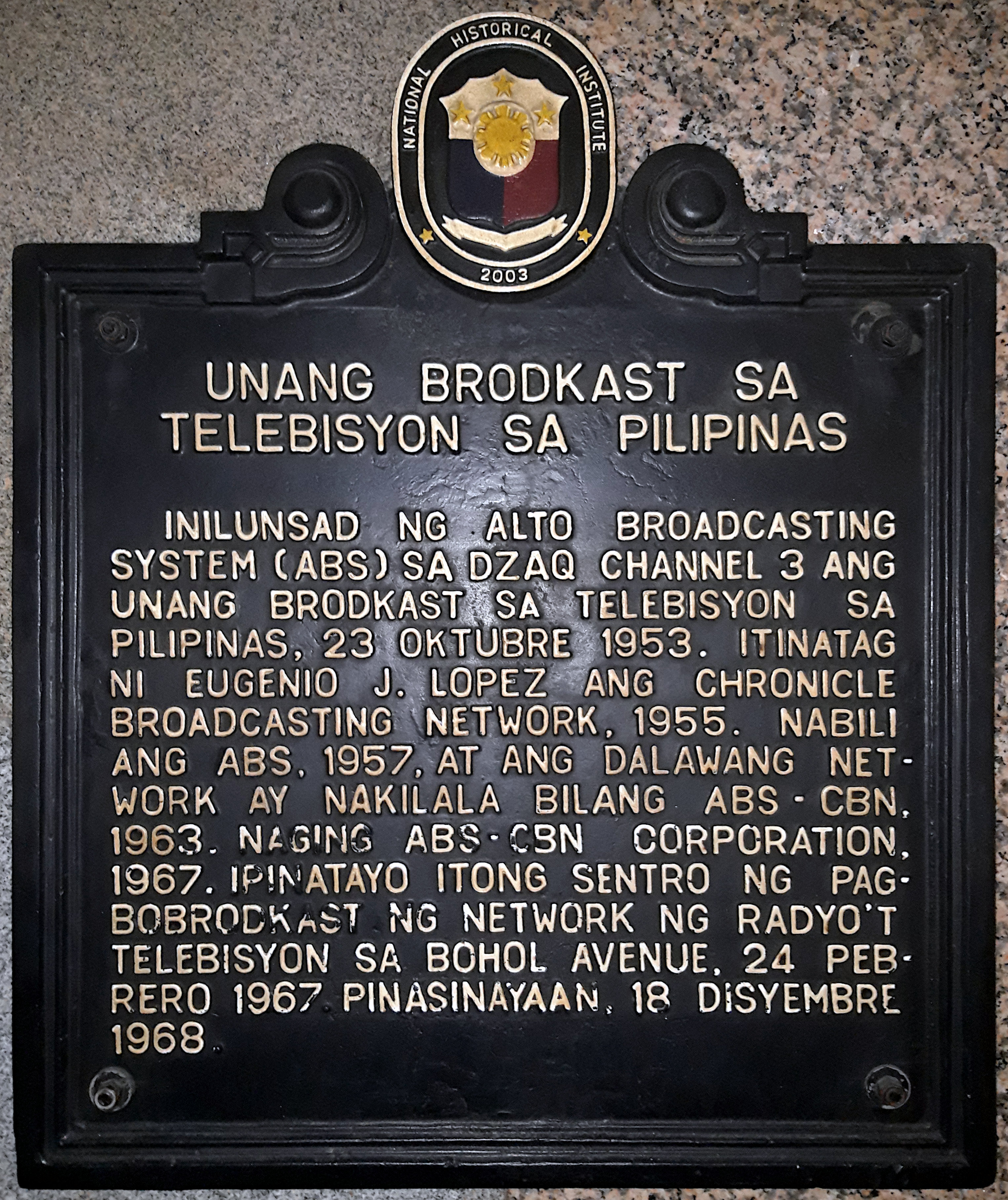
National historical marker installed in 2003 at ABS-CBN's broadcast center in Quezon City commemorating the very first television broadcast by ABS

In 1951, Lindenberg partnered with Antonio Quirino, brother of then-Philippine President Elpidio Quirino, in order to try their hand at television broadcasting. In 1952, BEC was renamed as Alto Broadcasting System or ABS (with Alto Sales Corporation as its corporate name). "Alto" was a contraction of Quirino's and his wife's first names, Tony and Aleli, and is Spanish for "tall". Though they had little money and resources, ABS was able to put up its TV tower by July 1953 and import some 300 television sets. The initial test broadcasts began in September of the same year. The first full-blown broadcast was on October 23, 1953, of a party in Tony Quirino's humble abode. The television station was known as DZAQ-TV.

On June 16, 1955, Republic Act No. 1343 signed by President Ramon Magsaysay granted the Manila Chronicle its broadcasting franchise, leading to the formation of the Chronicle Broadcasting Network (CBN).

CBN was founded on September 24, 1956, by Eugenio Lopez Sr. and the then-Philippine Vice President Fernando Lopez. The network initially focused only on radio broadcasting. It launched its very own TV station, DZXL-TV 9, on April 19 (or July), 1958. On February 24, 1957, Don Eugenio acquired ABS from Quirino and Lindenberg. A month later, Don Eugenio also acquired Monserrat Broadcasting System.

In 1958, the network's new headquarters at Dewey Boulevard was inaugurated, and all radio and television operations were consolidated into its two buildings – the radio stations at the Chronicle Building at Aduana Street, Intramuros, Manila and the TV operations at the brand new Dewey Boulevard building in Pasay, Rizal.

The ABS-CBN brand was first used in 1961. However, it was only two years later on 1963, that the company name was changed to ABS-CBN Broadcasting Corporation (or shortened to ABS-CBN Broadcasting). Before it was named ABS-CBN Broadcasting Corporation, the company name was Bolinao Electronics Corporation (BEC).

The company suffered its setback with the declaration of martial law by president then dictator Ferdinand Marcos. On September 23, 1972, two days after the signing of Proclamation No. 1081, ABS-CBN and its affiliate stations were seized. Almost 10,000 employees lost their jobs as a result of the takeover and shutdown of ABS-CBN.

ABS-CBN president Geny López was arrested in November 1972, imprisoned and held without trial for five years until he and his cellmate Sergio Osmeña III launched a daring jailbreak on October 1, 1977. They fled into exile in the United States together with their families.

ABS-CBN general manager Jake Almeda Lopez was also jailed for a year for his protest activities. After his daring and successful escape from Fort Bonifacio, he joined López in exile in the United States and kept himself busy protesting the Marcos Sr. dictatorship from abroad. He was a key figure in the protest over the Bataan Nuclear Power Plant.

The company was replaced by taken over by Banahaw Broadcasting Corporation (BBC) on November 4, 1973, with DZAQ-TV Channel 2 changed to its new call sign (DWWX-TV), logo, slogan and a theme song (composed by Jose Mari Chan entitled "Big Beautiful Country") under Roberto Benedicto, a crony of Ferdinand Marcos, then-Philippines ambassador to Japan, and sugar plantation owner, who used the Broadcasting Center at Bohol Avenue, then renamed "Broadcast Plaza", as the home of Government Television/Maharlika Broadcasting System (GTV/MBS, originally from Intramuros) and Kanlaon Broadcasting System/Radio Philippines Network (KBS/RPN, after the studio in Pasay was destroyed by fire on June 6, 1973). Some figures from ABS-CBN were worked with BBC including Peter Musñgi. In July 1978, BBC moved to new headquarters (together with RPN and the Intercontinental Broadcasting Corporation (IBC)) in Broadcast City (also in Diliman, Quezon City). DZXL-TV Channel 4 was taken over by the government agency National Media Production Center (NMPC) for the launch of Government Television (GTV) as DWGT-TV on February 2, 1974. The network's radio stations were also affected with BBC and KBS/RPN operating several of the stations. BBC and RPNs would pioneer the country's first true computer-generated imagery animations for station identifications in the early 1980s. BBC closed on September 7, 1986, as a result of its sequestration, and ABS-CBN Corporation and its namesake media network were relaunched a week after on September 14.

On August 21, 2007, the company started to use the ABS-CBN Corporation name to reflect its diversification with ABS-CBN Broadcasting Corporation is still used on some uses as such both names are now alternatively used from that point. It was announced publicly through "Beyond Television" plug the following year during the 55th anniversary of its namesake media network in 2008. According to chairman Gabby Lopez during its annual stockholders' meeting where the company announced further about the adaptation of the newer 2007 name on May 27, 2010, it is "a response to the changes in the media landscape brought about by technology. The media business has gone beyond merely broadcasting to encompass other platforms."

On May 5, 2020, ABS-CBN's free-to-air operations, including television, radio, and affiliate stations, were indefinitely axed once again after the National Telecommunications Commission (NTC) issued a cease-and-desist order after the company's legislative franchise that was granted 25 years later was lapsed a day before. Over two months later on July 10, on account of alleged multiple controversies discussed during its application for a franchise renewal, the Lower House of the Congress of the Philippines, through its Committee on Legislative Franchises, voted 70–11 to deny such application, causing the company officially end their free-to-air broadcasting era. It has then pivoted to distribution/syndication of their content and programs through partner networks as well as online platforms.

== Assets, divisions, and subsidiaries ==
ABS-CBN Corporation owns major media and entertainment companies in the Philippines, and offers services and products such as radio broadcast, satellite and cable television broadcast, broadcast syndication, telecommunications, publishing, content production and program and film distributor, television production, film production, new media and digital platforms, talent agencies, pay TV and broadband internet provider, consumer sales and merchandise, music label and recording, and theater. (Note: ABS-CBN Corporation is the Philippines' largest media and entertainment company in terms of assets, revenue, international services, revenue, operating income, net income, assets, equity, market capitalization, and number of employees.)

The company owns and operates general entertainment broadcaster Kapamilya Channel and English-language news service ABS-CBN News Channel under ABS-CBN, AM radio station DZMM and Filipino-language cable and online news channel DZMM TeleRadyo (through a joint venture with Prime Media Holdings), and digital radio platform MOR Entertainment, and also the ultimate beneficial owner, producer, distributor, provider and responsible to shows, movies including restored ones, franchises acquired, music, idents, and ABS-CBN-related websites and social media accounts produced by its divisions, subsidiaries and production companies and public relations and press releases relating to them, and physical company properties such as ID laces as such using the media company name or its trade names on them aside from official documents and reports.

The Kapamilya Channel, in particular, is the largest contributor to the company's revenue mainly from selling airtime to advertisers. The remaining revenue is generated from block-timing and other networks and platforms as well as from consumer sales, mainly from ABS-CBN Global Ltd. and ABS-CBN International, which distributes international television channels such as TFC HD, ANC Global, Cinema One Global, Cine Mo! Global, DZMM TeleRadyo Global and Myx Global and also from pay TV and broadband internet provider Sky Cable Corporation.

Other companies which operate under the ABS-CBN media company are motion picture companies under ABS-CBN Film Productions, such as Star Cinema, Cinema One Originals, Cine Bro and Black Sheep Productions, the entertainment division ABS-CBN Studios (Dreamscape Entertainment, Star Creatives, RCD Narratives, JRB Creative Production, RGE Drama Unit under RSB Scripted Format, and ABS-CBN Creative Communications Management), entertainment and film production Star Magic Studio (under Star Magic), and online ticketing and streaming site KTX.

It also operate music record labels under ABS-CBN Music, such as Star Music (also known as Star Records and corporately as Star Recording, Inc.) and its subsidiaries, Tarsier Records, and MYX Global. The companys's publishing assets include ABS-CBN Publishing and ABS-CBN Books, pay TV content provider and distributor Creative Programs, telecommunications company ABS-CBN Convergence (68% co-owned with Globe Telecom). Its talent agency Star Magic, corporately as ABS-CBN Center for Communication Arts, Inc. and Showbiz Magic, Inc., is composed of divisions such as Star Hunt, Polaris, and Rise Artists Studio.

The ABS-CBN media company's main entertainment and production division is called Star Creatives Group. The company's pay TV networks and channels include ANC, Cinema One, Cine Mo!, DZMM TeleRadyo, Jeepney TV, Kapamilya Channel, Knowledge Channel, Metro Channel, Myx.

In recent years, ABS-CBN has ventured and diversified into other businesses such as over-the-top platforms iWant, TFC IPTV and web-based channel Kapamilya Online Live. Both iWant TFC and Kapamilya Online Live are under ABS-CBN Digital Media (corporately known as ABS-CBN Interactive, Inc.), a new media and digital division under ABS-CBN which also handles news.ABS-CBN.com and ABS-CBN.com.

ABS-CBN is also the principal owner of the ABS-CBN Philharmonic Orchestra. It owns ABS-CBN Studios, Inc. which operates its production facilities nationwide, including the ABS-CBN Soundstage located in Bulacan, and the newly relaunched theater arm of ABS-CBN, Teatro Kapamilya. ABS-CBN also owns, operates, and maintains many other real estate properties and divisions, including the ABS-CBN Corporate Security and Safety, and Integrated Corporate Communications.
