= Rizal Technological University =

Public university in Mandaluyong, Philippines

- Pamantasang Teknolohikal ng Rizal (Filipino)
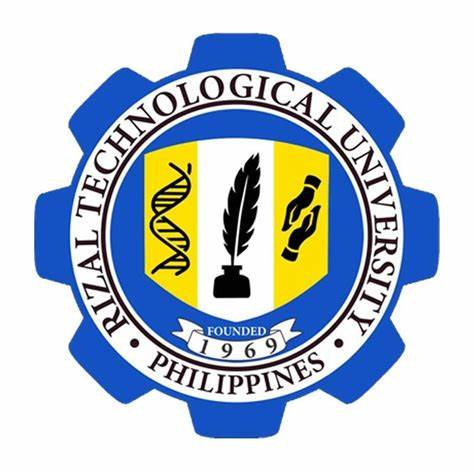
- Former names: College of Rizal (1969–1975); Rizal Technological College (1975–1997)
- Motto: Forever True to the Gold and Blue, Pandayang Rizalia
- Type: State/Public Coeducational Non-sectarian Non-profit higher education institution
- Established: July 11, 1969; 57 years ago
- Academic affiliations: ASAIHL • PASUC
- Chairman: Dr. Ricmar P. Aquino
- President: Dr. Rodolfo L. Ducut
- Students: 30,653 (AY 2014); 26,440 (AY 2024)
- Location: 704 Boni Avenue corner Sacrepante Street, Mandaluyong City, Metro Manila, Philippines; 14°34′27.81″N 121°02′31.31″E
- Campus: Urban Main Campus: Mandaluyong City Satellite: Pasig City Baras, Rizal
- University Hymn: Dare to Dream
- Colors: Gold Blue
- Nicknames: Blue Thunders (college men's varsity teams); Lady Thunders (college women's varsity teams); Baby Thunders (High School boys' varsity teams)
- Sporting affiliations: SCUAA
- Mascot: Blue Thunder
- Website: www.rtu.edu.ph

- Location in Metro Manila Location in Luzon Location in the Philippines

Rizal Technological University (RTU) is a state university based in the National Capital Region of the Philippines, with its main campus in Mandaluyong City and a branch in Pasig City. It was established on July 11, 1969, as the College of Rizal, before it became autonomous in 1975. The state university is also the first educational institution in the country to use cooperative education as a curriculum plan which is recognized by various industries, businesses and agencies all over the country. The university has various different academic fields, and focuses primarily on architecture, engineering, and technology programs.

RTU is the first educational institutions in the Philippines to offer degrees in astronomy.

== History ==
=== College of Rizal ===
The College of Rizal was established on July 11, 1969, upon the approval by the Secretary of Education in response to the request of the Provincial Board of Rizal, headed by then Governor Isidro S. Rodriguez, to put up a higher education institution in the province of Rizal. It was first known as the College of Rizal.

The College of Rizal opened its classes on July 14, 1969, with course offerings in business administration, education, and liberal arts.

=== Rizal Technological College ===
On March 20, 1975, the College of Rizal in Pasig and Rizal Technical High School in Mandaluyong, both situated in the province of Rizal, were merged and converted into the Rizal Technological College (RTC) by the virtue of Presidential Decree (PD) No. 674. The decree authorized the expansion of curricular programs and promotion of researches in the development and conservation of natural resources in the province of Rizal. The promulgation of P.D. No. 751 on July 25, 1975, amended certain provisions of P.D. No. 674 and made the operation and maintenance of the Rizal Technological Colleges a joint project and undertaking of the Provincial Government of Rizal and the Meralco Foundation, Incorporated. This Decree broadened the support and strengthened the organization of the college.

In 1975, upon the establishment of the Metropolitan Manila Commission, Pasig and Mandaluyong was transferred to the territorial jurisdiction of the Metro Manila. The Province of Rizal could not continue supporting financially the Colleges. Several alternatives were proposed to save the RTC. One was to transfer the management and administration of the RTC to one of the existing towns in the province of Rizal or Metro Manila. The worst possible alternative was to phase out the Colleges. The leadership, the faculty, and the students of the Colleges would not allow this to happen, however, so they worked out the possible nationalization of the RTC. Through the support of then Metropolitan Manila Governor Imelda Marcos, the RTC constituency, with the Kabataang Barangay School Chapter of the RTC, and the Collegiate and High School Faculty Clubs at the forefront of the struggle for survival, President Ferdinand E. Marcos signed into law Presidential Decree 1341-A on April 1, 1978, converting the Rizal Technological Colleges into a State College. The decree, however, was received only on October 13, 1978; thus, the RTC has been celebrating its College Week, and later its University Week on the days centered on October 13.

=== University Status ===
After 19 years, the college was converted into the Rizal Technological University on October 11, 1997, by virtue of Republic Act (RA) No. 8365. The university is tasked to: provide instructions in the fields of engineering and technology, education, business and entrepreneurial technology, and the programs; and promote research, extension and advance studies in its areas of specialization.

=== RTU Today ===
As of Academic Year 2024–2025, the university has a total of more than 26,000 enrolled students from both campuses. RTU offers programs accredited by the Accrediting Agency of Chartered Colleges and Universities in the Philippines (AACCUP) and is also ISO 9001:2015 certified.

== Center for Astronomy Research and Development ==
As the nation's first institution to offer undergraduate and graduate program in Astronomy, the Department of Science and Technology designate RTU as the Center for Astronomy Research and Development (CARD).

In 2018, the Department of Science and Technology (DOST) expressed its support to RTU in a proposed construction of an extension campus in Baras, Rizal and set to be the hub of astronomical research in the Philippines and home of CARD. The future Baras campus with a 10.2 hectares of land owned by RTU will be equipped with observatory tower, planetarium, lecture hall and main academic hall.

== Academic Programs ==
Colleges	Founded	Programs
College of Engineering	1970	Mechanical Engineering Civil Engineering Electrical Engineering Electronics Engineering Industrial Engineering Instrumentation and Control Engineering Mechatronics Master in Instrumentation and Control Engineering Master in Industrial Engineering
College of Business, Entrepreneurship and Accountancy	1970	Accountancy Entrepreneurship Office Administration Business Administration major in: Operations Management; Marketing Management; Financial Management; Human Resource Management; Masters in Business Administration Doctor in Business Administration
College of Education (with Laboratory School)	1985	Secondary Education major in: English; Filipino; Math; Sciences; Social Studies; Technical-Vocational Teacher Education major in: Computer Systems Servicing; Visual Graphic Design; Electronics Technology; Garments, Fashion, and Design; Welding and Fabrications Technology; Animation; Laboratory School: Junior High School; Senior High School; Doctor of Philosophy in Technology Education
College of Arts and Sciences	1975	Astronomy Psychology Political Science Statistics Biology Master of Arts in Astronomy Master of Arts in Psychology Doctor of Philosophy in Public Administration
Institute of Human Kinetics	2000	Physical Education
Institute of Computer Studies	2024 (Its programs were formerly offered under the College of Engineering)	Information and Communication Technology Computer Engineering Master in Computer Engineering Master in Information Technology
Institute of Architecture	2024 (Its program was formerly offered under the College of Engineering)	Architecture

Under the new organizational structure, the Rizal Technological University – Laboratory School (RTU-LS) formerly Laboratory High School, is the high school department of the RTU and it is situated inside the main campus in Mandaluyong. The Laboratory School provides secondary curriculum with added technology-based subjects such as electronics, civil technology, drafting, metal works and machine shop, business technology for boys and girls, food trades and garment trades for girls only. The RTU – Laboratory School also serves as the training center for the pre-service teachers of the College of Education. The levels are divided into Grades 7–10 (Junior High) and Grades 11–12. (Senior High).

== Administrators ==
The university has been placed under the stewardship of seven administrators:

As College of Rizal (1969–1975)

- Dr. Jose M. Singson – Executive Dean (1969)
- Dr. Marcial R. Rañosa – Acting Executive Dean (1969–1974)
- Dr. Lydia M. Profeta – Executive Dean (1974–1975)

As Rizal Technological Colleges (locally funded – 1975–1978)

- Dr. Julio Balmes – Officer-in-Charge (1975–1976)
- Dr. Lydia M. Profeta – Executive Dean (1976–1978)

As Rizal Technological Colleges (state college, nationally funded – 1979–1997)

- Dr. Lydia M. Profeta – Acting President (1979–1986)
- Dr. Josefina V. Estolas – Officer-in-Charge (1986–1987) and College President (1987–1993)
- Dr. Jose Q. Macaballug – Officer-in-Charge (1993) and College President (1993–1997)

As Rizal Technological University (1997–present)

- Dr. Jose Q. Macaballug – University President (1997–2010) and Officer-In-Charge (2010 – November 5, 2010)
- Dr. Jesus Rodrigo F. Torres – University President (November 6, 2010 – November 6, 2018)
- Dr. Ma. Eugenia M. Yangco – University President (November 16, 2018 – November 19, 2026)
- Dr. Rodolfo L. Ducut - University President (November 19, 2026 – present)

== Student Publication ==
The Guardian Publication is the official student publication of RTU, established in 1996, written in an English medium. Aside from its annually newspapers, The Guardian also releases a special literary folio called Lagaslasan. The student organ has its mascots named Gimo Tagabantay and Pipay, representing the students from Mandaluyong and Pasig campus, respectively.

== Athletics ==
The RTU varsity teams are called Blue Thunders. The women's teams are called the Lady Thunders, while the juniors' (high school) teams are called the Baby Thunders. RTU Blue Thunders won the SCUAA Over-All Championship six times and the 2009 Over-All Champion in 13th UniGames in CPU, Iloilo.

The RTU Blue Thunders men's basketball team won the silver medal in 2009 Penang Unity Chief Basketball Minister Friendship Cup invitational basketball tournament. The following are the varsity sports at RTU: Basketball, Volleyball, Chess, Lawn Tennis, Table Tennis, Athletics, Baseball, Softball, Swimming, Boxing, Cheer dance, Dance Sports, Track and Field, Sepak Takraw, Badminton, Taekwondo, Arnis, Beach Volleyball.

== Notable alumni ==
- Jan Michael Silverio Tan – Ultimate Male Survivor in the second batch of the reality show StarStruck aired on GMA Network
- Ed Daquioag – RTU-LHS – basketball player for Rain or Shine Elasto Painters
- Nesthy Petecio – An olympic silver medalist in the field of boxing.
- Anngela Nunag – volleyball player for Cignal HD Spikers

== Gallery ==
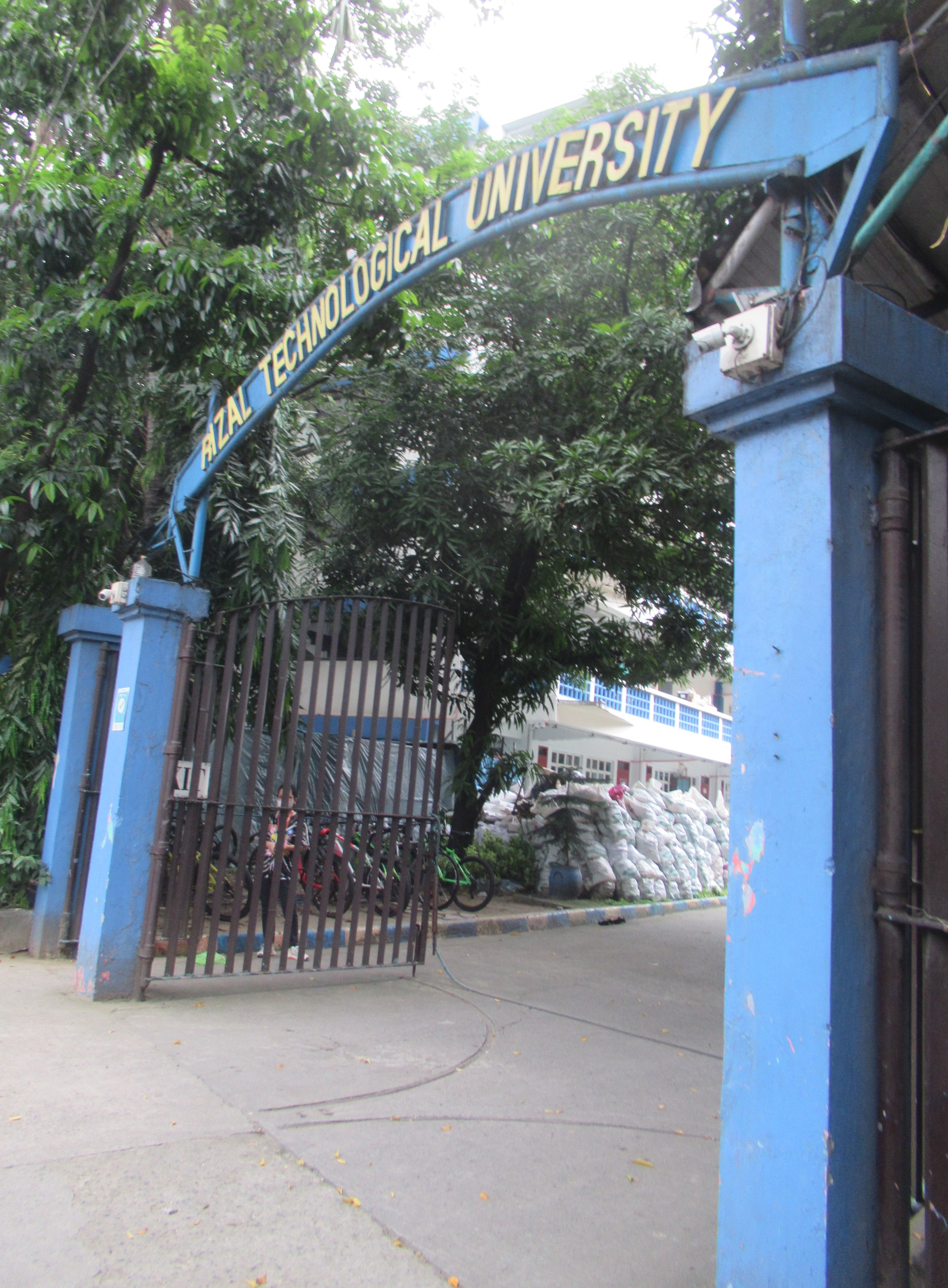
Main gate

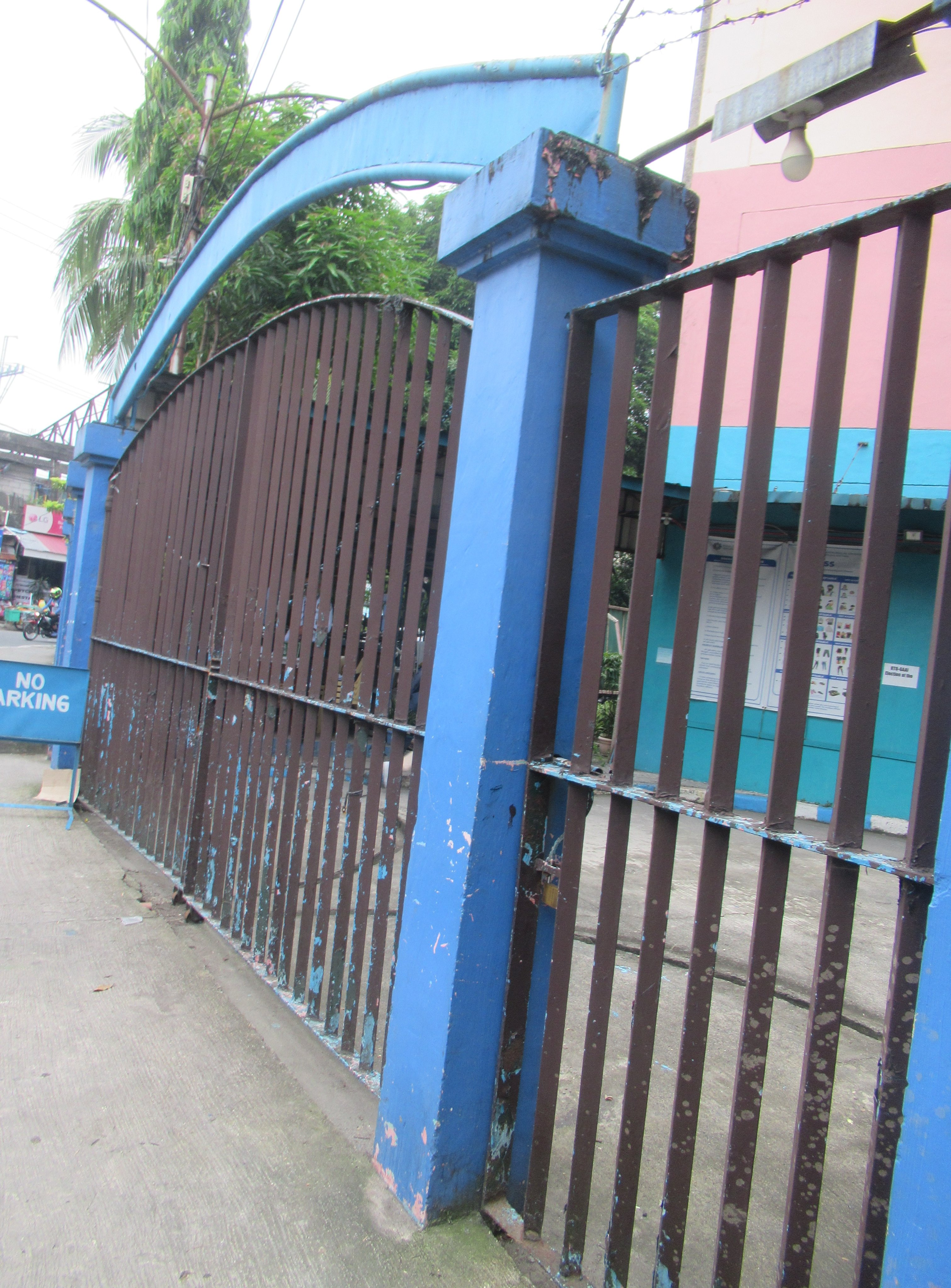
Old gate

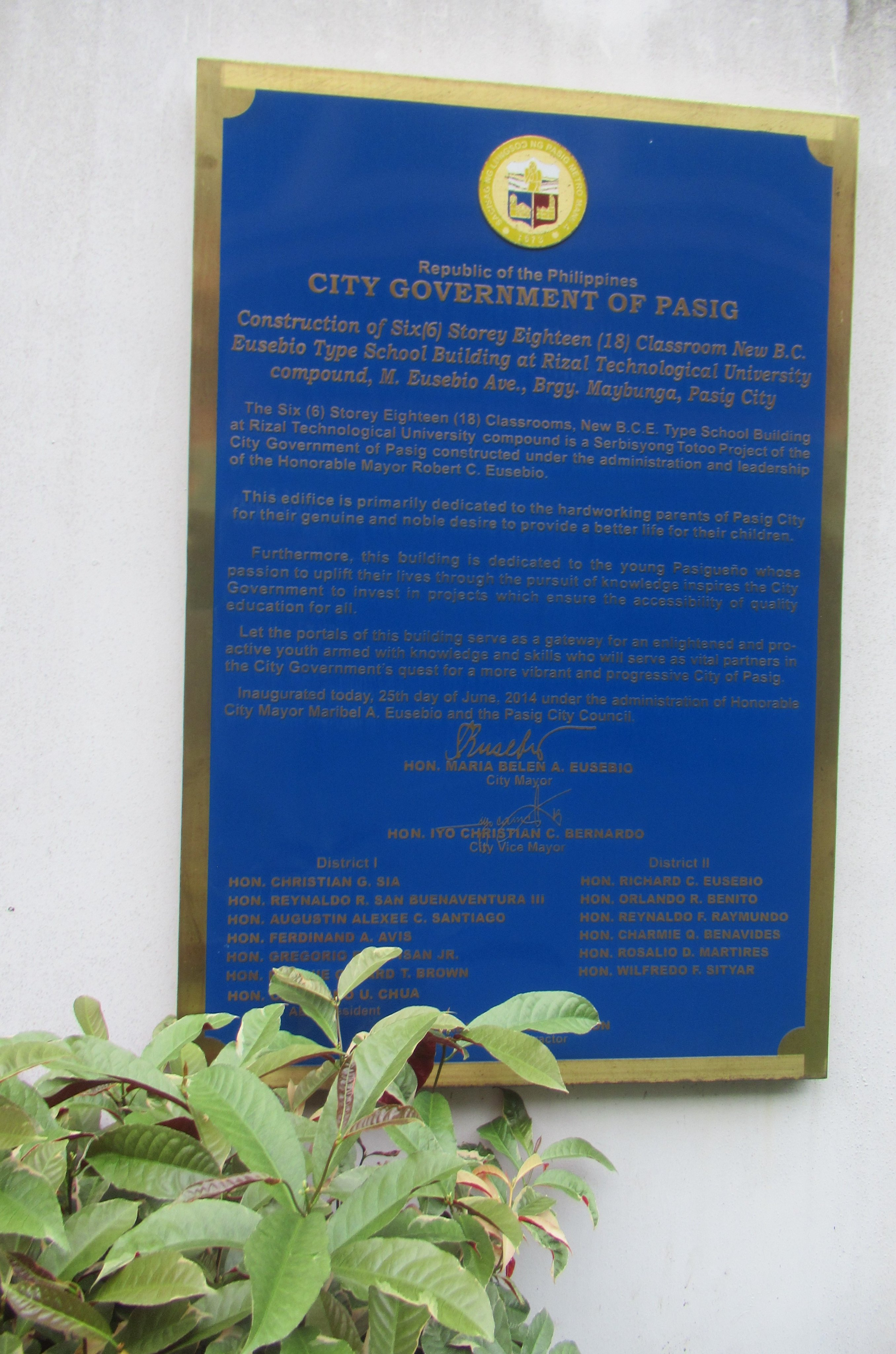
Historical marker

== See also ==
- List of universities and colleges in the Philippines
- State Colleges and Universities Athletic Association
- State University and Colleges Official Directory of the Republic of the Philippines
