= GSIS–Meralco bribery case =

GSIS v. Court of Appeals (8th Division), et al.
- Court: Supreme Court of the Philippines en banc

Full case name
- Government Service Insurance System vs. The Honorable Court of Appeals (8th Division), Anthony V. Rosete, Manuel M. Lopez, Felipe B. Alfonso, Jesus F. Francisco, Christian S. Monsod, Elpidio L. Ibañez, and Francis Giles Puno Securities And Exchange Commission, Commissioner Jesus Enrique G. Martinez in his capacity as Officer-In-Charge of the Securities and Exchange Commission and Hubert G. Guevara in his capacity as Director of the Compliance And Enforcement Department of Securities v. Anthony V. Rosete, Manuel M. Lopez, Felipe B. Alfonso, Jesus F. Francisco, Christian S. Monsod, Elpidio L. Ibañez, and Francis Giles
- Decided: April 16, 2009
- G.R. numbers: 183905 and 184275
- Citation: 603 Phil. 676

Case history
- Prior action(s): Regional Trial Court of Pasay: GSIS v. Rosete (R-PSY-08-05777-CV) (filed May 23, 2008; withdrawn by petitioner May 26, 2008; dismissed June 5, 2008); Securities and Exchange Commission: Cease and desist order (CDO) served May 27; show cause order (SCO) served May 28; Court of Appeals: cert. with prohibition granted May 29; Antonio Rosete, et al. v. Securities and Exchange Commission, et al. (CA–G.R. SP No. 103692); SEC; Supreme Court: Disciplinary action taken against Court of Appeals justices who decided Rosete, see infobox immediately below
- Subsequent action(s): Motion for reconsideration and for en banc hearing denied September 2, 2009

Holding
- Ponente: Dante Tinga
- Almost all of the Court of Appeals' ruling was upheld, except where sanctions imposed on GSIS lawyers were in conflict with Section 47 of the GSIS enabling act, Republic Act No. 8291
- Concurrence: Leonardo Quisumbing, Conchita Carpio Morales, Presbitero Velasco Jr., Arturo Brion

Anthony V. Rosete, et al. v. Securities & Exchange Commission, et al.
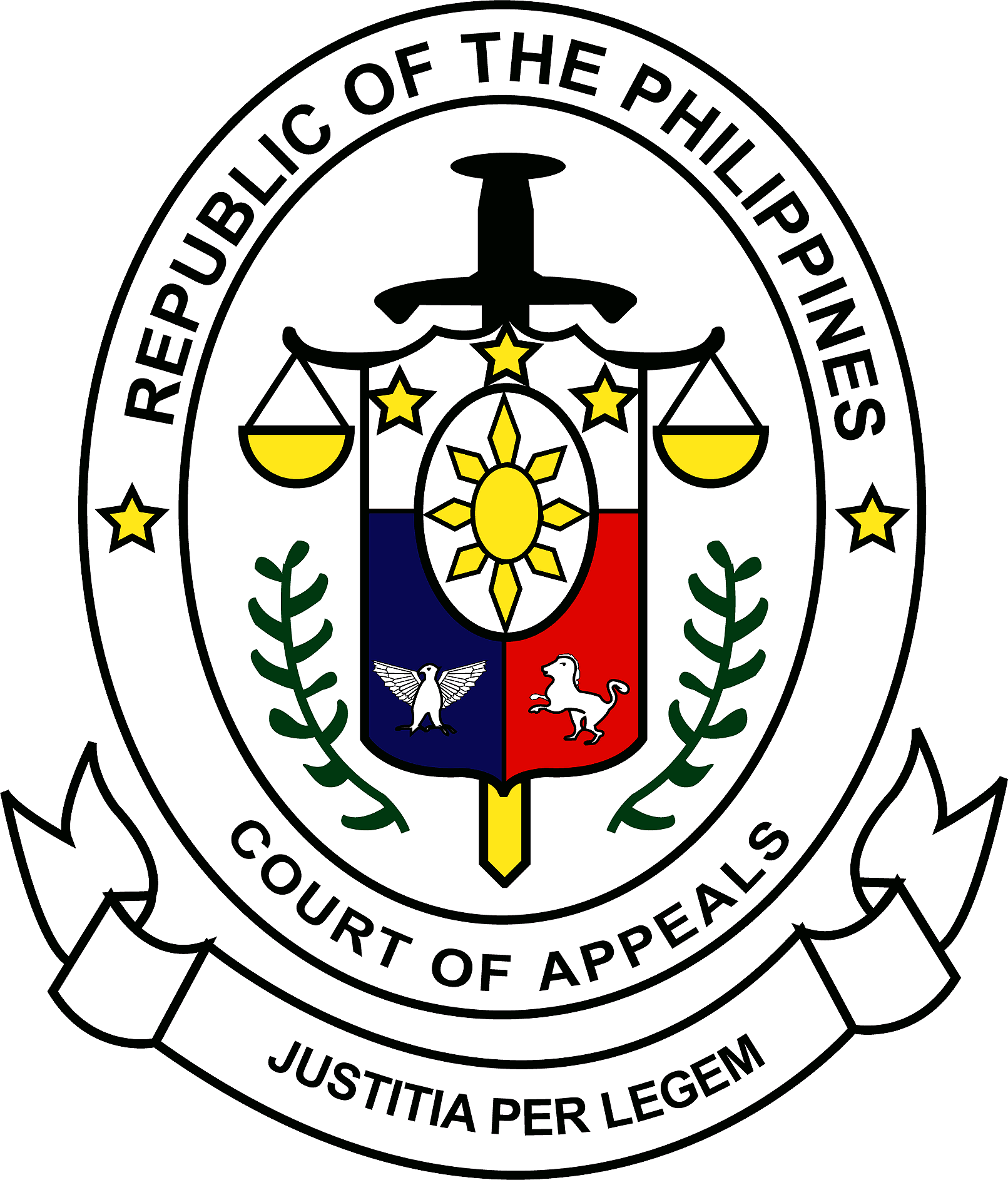
- Court: Court of Appeals

Holding
- Ponente: Bienvenido L. Reyes
- The SEC lacked jurisdiction to issue the CDO and SCO, therefore they were void ab initio.
- Concurrence: Apolinario D. Bruselas, Vicente Q. Roxas

Re: Letter of Presiding Justice Conrado M. Vasquez, Jr. on CA-G.R. SP No. 103692
- Disciplinary hearing against Court of Appeals justices for alleged abuses of power
- Court: Supreme Court of the Philippines en banc

Full case name
- Re: Letter of Presiding Justice Conrado M. Vasquez, Jr. on CA-G.R. SP No. 103692 [Antonio Rosete, et al. v. Securities and Exchange Commission, et al.]
- Decided: September 9, 2008
- Citation: A.M. No. 08-8-11-CA

Case history
- Subsequent action(s): Motion for reconsideration denied October 15, 2008
- Ponente: None, unanimous per curiam decision

Court membership
- Judges sitting: C.J. Puno, Quisumbing, Ynares-Santiago, Carpio, Austria-Martinez, Corona, Carpio Morales, Azcuna, Tinga, Chico-Nazario, Velasco, Jr., Nachura, Reyes, Leonardo-De Castro and Brion, JJ.

GSIS v. Court of Appeals (8th Division), et al., 603 Phil. 676 (2009), better known as the GSIS–Meralco bribery case, was a landmark case heard by the Supreme Court of the Philippines. This complex case began with a complaint filed by the Philippines' Government Service Insurance System (GSIS) with the Securities and Exchange Commission of the Philippines (SEC) questioning the unvalidated proxy votes used by the Lopez family in a board election of the Manila Electric Company (Meralco). The SEC issued a cease and desist order (CDO) against Meralco, which was ignored by the latter. A show cause order (SCO) was then issued by the SEC, whereupon Meralco petitioned the Court of Appeals, questioning the jurisdiction of the SEC. The Court of Appeals issued a temporary restraining order (TRO) to the SEC while the Special 9th Division composed of Associate Justices Vicente Q. Roxas, Jose L. Sabio Jr. and Myrna Dimaranan Vidal heard the case. Roxas was assigned as the ponente while Sabio was the acting chairman.

Later, Sabio called a press conference and alleged that an emissary of Meralco tried to bribe him with ₱10 million to have a case transferred to another appeals court justice. The criminal charges are obstruction of justice and malfeasance in office. Sabio did not mention any names, but businessman Francis de Borja stepped forward and claimed that he was the alleged emissary, accusing Sabio of asking for a ₱50 million bribe to side with Meralco, in response to De Borja's question “What will it take for you to resist the government’s offer?” The alleged government offer was a Supreme Court position. In the latter course of the investigation, Sabio let slip that his brother, Presidential Commission on Good Government (PCGG) Chairman Camilo Sabio, called him up twice to urge him to side favorably with the government. The late admission of the allegedly unethical and criminal action called into doubt the innocence of Sabio in coming forward with his expose and the veracity of his entire story. These acts are alleged to be punishable under Article 208 and 243 of the Revised Penal Code, respectively.

It also came out during the course of the Supreme Court investigation that Court of Appeals Justice Vicente Roxas, the ponente of the controversial Meralco decision, had himself committed improprieties. One such impropriety was that Roxas preempted the legal opinion of Presiding Justice Conrado Vasquez that the Special 9th Division should have ruled on the case as per the Internal Rules of the Court of Appeals (IRCA), and not the 8th Division to which Roxas was transferred, and which eventually promulgated a ruling in favor of Meralco, with Justices Reyes and Apolinario Bruselas hastily signing the ponencia without going over or reading the memoranda submitted by concerned parties.

The Supreme Court, voting 12–1, ordered the dismissal of Roxas after he was found guilty of multiple violations of the canons of the Code of Judicial Conduct, grave misconduct, dishonesty, undue interest and conduct prejudicial to the best interest of service.

Sabio was suspended for two months after he was found guilty of simple misconduct and conduct unbecoming of a justice of the CA. Vasquez was severely reprimanded “for his failure to act promptly and decisively in order to avert the incidence that damaged the image of the Court of Appeals,” Reyes was found guilty of simple misconduct with mitigating circumstance, and Vidal was found guilty of conduct unbecoming of a justice of the appellate court for being “too compliant" when she allowed herself to sign the decision without reading the parties’ memorandum.

== History ==
It started on May 11, 2008, when the Philippines' Government Service Insurance System (GSIS) accused Meralco of unlawful refusal to grant corporate access to documents despite the GSIS’ holding 4 seats in the 11-member Meralco board, amid GSIS' denial of plans to wrest control from the Lopez family.

The scandal originated from the Meralco and GSIS row after Sabio—in a letter-complaint against Justices Vicente Roxas and Bienvenido Reyes—complained of the circumstances that he was removed from the GSIS–Meralco case after a standard court reorganization, and an alleged bribe attempt by Manolo Lopez and Meralco in consideration for him giving way to Reyes' chairmanship of the CA's Special 9th Division It catches nationwide attention when businessman Francis De Borja surfaces and accuses Sabio via sworn affidavit that the justice had asked for P50 million to back away from the case, to counter a government offer of money and a Supreme Court appointment in exchange for a ruling favorable to GSIS.

=== Background ===
In 1962, Don Eugenio López, Sr. acquired MERALCO and it finally became Filipino-owned, but Ferdinand Marcos, by decree, placed it under a shell company called the Meralco Foundation, Inc., controlled by a crony under government-controlled Napocor.

In 1978, Meralco was fully controlled by the Marcos administration, but its ownership was finally returned to the Lopez family after the People Power Revolution by President Corazon Aquino. By executive order, she allowed Meralco to directly compete with NAPOCOR.

Gloria Macapagal Arroyo on May 2, 2008, announced plans to reduce Luzon high power rates, amid a “tough legal fight” with Meralco before state energy regulators. Accordingly, GSIS, through its President Winston Garcia, on May 11, stated it "planned not only to buy out the Lopez family and other shareholders in Meralco but also to break up its concession to promote efficiency and transparency." But Meralco chair and CEO Manuel Lopez said he was not selling the utility.

=== The cases and facts ===
Oscar Lopez blamed the Arroyo administration's moves to take over Meralco in a “reverse privatization,” because of the Lopez-owned ABS-CBN's negative publicity against the government.

==== May 27 stockholders’ meeting ====
During the May 27, 2008, stockholders’ meeting, GSIS' President Winston Garcia obtained an SEC “cease-and-desist order” to stop and defer the counting of proxy votes held by the Lopez group until questions on its validity were resolved. GSIS accused the Lopezes of “rigging” the process. GSIS failed to gain control of Meralco after a TRO from the Court of Appeals was issued, and the SEC order was placed on hold. Meralco retained its 5 seats, the government its 4, while the 2 others are independent directors Artemio Panganiban and Vicente Panlilio. Aside from Manuel Lopez, the Meralco directors elected are Jesus Francisco, Felipe Alfonso, Christian Monsod and Cesar Virata, while the government board members elected aside from Garcia, are Bernardino Abes, Daisy Arce and Jeremy Parulan.

On May 30, the said temporary restraining order from the Philippine Court of Appeals, against the SEC order from the 9th Division, composed of Justices Roxas and Vidal, was released. They are joined by substitute Justice Jose Sabio, replacement for Justice Bienvenido Reyes, who was on leave. Despite the return of Justice Reyes in time from his leave, and his trying to claim back his post, Sabio refused to give up the position. The TRO is released with Sabio signing instead.

Senior Associate Justice Rodrigo Cosico retires, and the Court of Appeals undergoes a mandatory reorganization. Following court rules, the case followed the Justice-writer assigned to it, Justice Vicente Roxas. The case moved to the 8th Division, composed of Justice Reyes, Roxas, and Bruselas.

The Court's 8th Division rendered a 57-page judgment authored by Justice Vicente Roxas on July 24 against the GSIS, affirming Meralco's stance that the SEC has no jurisdiction over the issue.

A large-scale negative media blitz is launched by unknown persons against the author of the decision, Justice Roxas.

Justice Myrna Dimaranan-Vidal, together with Justice Jose Sabio, former special 9th Division members, challenged the decision, per letter to CA Presiding Justice Conrado Vasquez Jr., thus: "How can the 8th Division issue an order when it is the 9th that has been hearing the complaint of alleged irregularities in the Meralco election?" It is also the 9th Division that issued the temporary restraining order on the SEC order to Meralco on May 30."

Assistant Clerk of Court, lawyer Manuel Cervantes, said no irregularity had been committed when the 8th Division came out with the decision instead of the 9th, simply a result of the reorganization of the court. "The case goes with the ponente(justice assigned to pen the case),” Cervantes explained. “Justice Vicente Roxas is the ponente. Even with the change in division, the case stays with him." “Due to the retirement of some justices, Justice Vidal was reassigned to the 6th Division while Reyes became chair of the 8th,” Cervantes said. Roxas was moved to the 8th Division, Vidal went to the 6th, and Sabio to the 9th. And since the rule is that the case goes with the ponente, the 57-page decision was issued by the division of which Justice Roxas was now a part, he said. Permission is not required from the previous division nor its justices.

He said the IRCA (Internal Rules of the Court of Appeals) does not require the justices who issued the TRO to be the same justices to render the decision.

The Court of Appeals Reorganization Office Order No. 200-08-CMV was issued by Presiding Justice Vasquez on July 4, three weeks before the decision was released.

Justice Jose Sabio refuses to let go of the GSIS–Meralco case, and insists on being a part of the division to decide the case. He submits the case to the internal rules committee of the court, headed by Justice Edgardo P. Cruz. The Court of Appeals committee decides as early as June 20 that the committee, which clarifies internal rules of the court, rejects Justice Sabio's argument that the pending case should go with him following a court reorganization. By the rules, the division headed by Justice Bienvenido L. Reyes should hear the leadership row at Meralco. Sabio disregards Cruz's recommendation on the basis he was only a "junior justice".

On July 26, Justice Sabio, with the encouragement of Justice Vidal (his colleague in the 9th Special Division), broke news of a bribery attempt and wrote to P.J. Vasquez, Jr. He joined Justice Vidal, initiating further a media expose of their squabbles, alleging something “stinks” in the Meralco court ruling. Presiding Justice Vasquez released his opinion, also, per his July 24, 2008, Letter to Justices Bienvenido L. Reyes & Vicente Q. Roxas.

Businessman Francis de Borja emerges and reveals to the media a notarized and sworn affidavit that it was Justice Sabio who brought up a P50 million price for him to act in favor of Meralco in its dispute with the GSIS. Mr. de Borja asserts that Mr. Sabio had told him a Supreme Court seat was being offered in exchange for a ruling in favor of the GSIS, which is trying to wrest control of Meralco from the Lopezes. Expecting Sabio to answer that he would not be swayed by any offer and would rule according to his conscience, De Borja asked what it would take for him to resist the supposed government offer of a seat on the Supreme Court and money. He was taken aback when Sabio replied "P50 million”, and then left.

Presiding Justice Conrado Vasquez comes under fire in the newspapers. Vasquez is criticized for having been able to spare the Court this trouble on the court's integrity had he followed the recommendation of the rules committee. With Vasquez's opinion favoring Sabio despite the reorganization, and the lack of a preliminary injunction that would exempt Meralco from being transferred to Reyes's and Roxas's division, doubt is cast on Vasquez's motivations.

Manolo Lopez calls the accusations of Sabio malicious and a pure fabrication. He vehemently denied the allegations, especially Sabio's accusation that he (Lopez) was waiting in the car during the meeting. He said he was out of the country for a medical check-up when the incident supposedly happened, and returned only last July 13. As proof, he showed tickets showing his departure dated June 27 and his arrival dated July 13.

The panel investigation found out that Chairman Camilo Sabio of the Presidential Commission on Good Government (PCGG) called up his brother, Justice Jose Sabio Jr., twice. The first time on May 30, to lobby his brother to adopt the position of the Government Service Insurance System (GSIS) versus Manila Electric Co. (Meralco). This was hours before the Ninth Division of the Court of Appeals (temporarily headed by Sabio) issued a temporary restraining order in Meralco's favor. Camilo called up Jose at 8 a.m., when the court's practice is to hand down its decisions at 10 a.m. Then, after the Court of Appeals decided the case with finality on July 23, Camilo called up Jose again, asking why he had not signed the decision.

When Camilo called the first time, he informed Jose that he was going to be the acting chairman of the Special Ninth Division of the court; and that furthermore, a TRO against the Securities and Exchange Commission order that the GSIS desired was being prepared. Camilo suggested to Jose that the latter should not sign the TRO. When Camilo called once more, it was to ask why the 8th Division, and not the Special 9th Division, had decided. Justice Jose had lobbied strenuously to head the 8th even after Justice Bienvenido Reyes, the person he was substituting for, was back on the job.

Retired Supreme Court Justice Romeo Callejo Sr., one of those conducting the investigation, castigated Justice Sabio for not bringing up the intervention of his brother previously—or reprimanding his brother. “Why did you not report your brother’s attempt to influence you? That was unethical. You did nothing; you are a professor of ethics. Did you not consider that your brother’s attempt was criminal?” Callejo asked.

Sabio's replies alternated between the irrelevant (his brother was older than he, he said) and patent hair-splitting (there was no outright offer of a bribe from his brother). They only reduced the reasonable doubt so far supporting Sabio by reducing the options the justice operated under to three: he was hopelessly naïve; he had been too clever for his own good; or he was a bumbling prisoner of circumstance, who had blown the lid off a legal system so thoroughly tainted it cannot absolve itself the longer the inquiry continues.

This called into question Justice Sabio's squabble with fellow Reyes over who should have jurisdiction over the case. It explained why Justice Sabio would, in turn, on July 1, meet lawyer Francis de Borja to discuss a case he had every reason to know would be brought up by a party friendly to Meralco. It's either that the Ateneo de Manila Law School's professor of legal ethics had no comprehension of the subject he teaches or he is a plain and simple hypocrite. He brags about being a righteous professor of legal ethics, which we can never believe now after knowing from the investigation his lapses in performing what is expected of a member of the court.

This provided circumstantial evidence for concluding that Sabio was playing off both sides to see who might bid highest, confirming, incidentally, many details in De Borja's affidavit while calling into question the completeness, and ultimately the veracity, of Sabio's own statements.

Justice Sabio move to come forward to blow the whistle is cast in doubt by his selectivity. He denied allegations of Palace blandishments to do the GSIS’ bidding, but he left out his brother's intervention.

As a government official, Camilo's act of calling his brother to influence his decision is punishable under Article 243 of the Revised Penal Code. Article 243 (orders or requests by executive offices to any judicial authority) states that:"Any executive officer who shall address any order or suggestion to any judicial authority with respect to any case or business coming within the exclusive jurisdiction of the courts of justice shall suffer the penalty of arresto mayor and a fine."

As an official of the Court, Justice Sabio is mandated under Article 208 of the Revised Penal Code to report any possible violation of the law, with negligence and tolerance as the offending act. Article 208 states: “The penalty of prison correctional in its minimum period (six months and 1 day to 2 years and four months) and suspension shall be imposed upon any public officer or officer of the law who, in dereliction of the duties of his office, shall maliciously refrain from instituting prosecution for the punishment of violations of the law, or shall tolerate the commission of offenses.” The public is in anticipation of whether criminal charges for bribery and violation of Article 208 of the RPC will be filed against Sabio the soonest possible time to determine the extent of his culpability.

==== The CA Justices in the case ====
ABS-CBN and Philippines Newsbreak Magazine reported on the CA Justices of the case. ABS-CBN researched and published that:

- Presiding Justice Vasquez, Jr. was presiding Judge of Branch 118, Regional Trial Court of Pasay.
- Associate Justice Sabio, Jr., chair of the CA Ninth Division, graduated from the Ateneo de Manila University College of Law. He is a Pre-Bar Reviewer in Legal Ethics at the Ateneo School of Law, where he also teaches Civil Procedure, Criminal Procedure and Constitutional Law I. In 2003, an administrative complaint was filed against him for ignorance of the law and inexcusable negligence, and charging him with deliberately causing the delay of the prosecution in Estafa entitled, “People of the Philippines, Plaintiff versus Ferdinand Santos, Robert John Sobrepeña, Federico Campos, Polo Pantaleon, and Rafael Perez De Tagle, Jr.”
- Associate Justice Vidal was awarded a plaque of recognition as an outstanding judge by the Volunteers Against Crime and Corruption (VACC) in 2001, and in 2004, she was an outstanding judge who received Supreme Court Judicial Excellence Awards.
- Associate Justice Bienvenido L. Reyes is the chairman of the 8th Division that promulgated the decision. He obtained his LLB Degree from San Beda College and passed the Bar examinations in the same year. Reyes was promoted to CA Associate Justice on August 8, 2000, after serving as RTC Judge, in Br. 74, Malabon, from 1990. He was also a finalist in the 1997 Awards for Judicial Excellence. Justice Bienvenido L. Reyes was on leave after he suffered a heart attack (seizure) on the evening of August 8. He was brought to the intensive-care unit of the Capitol Medical Center, Quezon City, for "valvular heart disease, secondary to rheumatic heart disease; mitral regurgitation; and aortic valve stenosis (AS)." Reyes's physician, Dr. Francisco Lukban, however, later declared him stable.
- Associate Justice Vicente Roxas is a top ten bar exam topnotcher from the University of the Philippines College of Law. He was En Banc Consultant for the Securities and Exchange Commission for eleven years, and taught at the UP College of Law. He was an RTC Judge in Quezon City for ten years before his appointment as associate justice of the CA. In 2007, the Manila Times reported that Erlinda Bilder-Ilusurio, president of Philippine Communications Satellite Corp. (Philcomsat), filed an administrative case against him for ‘gross ignorance of the law’ after they lost a case, contending that their petition was withdrawn by Emmanuel Nieto, a Philcomsat stockholder. The SC unanimously dismissed the case.
- Associate Justice Bruselas was an RTC Judge in Quezon City before being appointed to the Court of Appeals. He served as a member of the technical working group of the judiciary's action program for judicial reform. He penned the decision in the Steel Corp. and Subic rape case.

Name	Position	Date of Appointment	Date of birth	Date of Retirement
Hon. CONRADO M. VASQUEZ, JR.	Presiding Justice	March 22, 1994	January 6, 1940	January 6, 2010
Hon. JOSE L. SABIO, JR.	Associate Justice	May 28, 1999	May 25, 1941	May 25, 2011
Hon. BIENVENIDO L. REYES	Associate Justice	August 22, 2000	July 6, 1947	July 6, 2017
Hon. VICENTE Q. ROXAS	Associate Justice	February 9, 2004	December 8, 1949	December 8, 2019
Hon. MYRNA DIMARANAN-VIDAL	Associate Justice	January 24, 2005	December 20, 1939	December 20, 2009
Hon. APOLINARIO D. BRUSELAS, JR.	Associate Justice	August 1, 2005	May 6, 1956	May 6, 2026

==== Attempted bribery and discipline of Philippine jurists and lawyers ====
Bribery attempt, in Philippine Jurisprudence, is considered a criminal offense or felony.

Philippine Court of Appeals Justices are under the administrative supervision of the Supreme Court of the Philippines, and may be disciplined by Disbarment or dismissal from service, under the Revised Rules of Court (1997 Code of Civil Procedure).

Also, the Philippine Court of Appeals' "Process of Adjudication" is governed by A.M. No. 02-6-13-CA 2005, the Revised Internal Rules of the Court of Appeals (RIRCA), Specific Amendments to the 2002 Internal Rules of the Court of Appeals, February 28, 2005.

==== The laws ====
The Revised Internal Rules of the Court of Appeals (RIRCA) regarding the matter are as follows:

RULE I - THE COURT, ITS ORGANIZATION AND OFFICIALS - SEC. 9. Reorganization of Divisions. − (a) Reorganization of Divisions shall be effected whenever a permanent vacancy occurs in the chairmanship of a Division, in which case assignment of Justices to the Divisions shall be in accordance with the order of seniority unless a waiver is executed by the Justice concerned which waiver shall be effective until revoked by him in writing.(n)

RULE VI - PROCESS OF ADJUDICATION - SEC. 1. Justice Assigned For Study and Report. − Every case, whether appealed or original, assigned to a Justice for study and report shall be retained by him even if he is transferred to another Division in the same station. ( Sec. 2, Rule 8, RIRCA [a])

SEC. 2. Justices Who May Participate in the Adjudication of Cases. − x x x (d) When, in an original action or petition for review, any of these actions or proceedings, namely: (1) giving due course; (2) granting writ of preliminary injunction; (3) granting new trial; and (4) granting execution pending appeal have been taken, the case shall remain with the Justice to whom the case is assigned for study and report and the Justices who participated therein, regardless of their transfer to other Divisions in the same station. (A.M. No. 02-6-13-CA - 2005 RIRCA: SPECIFIC AMENDMENTS TO THE 2002 INTERNAL RULES OF THE COURT OF APPEALS)

Justice Romeo Callejo, Sr., member of the 3-man panel investigation, Senator Kiko Pangilinan and Akbayan Rep. Risa Hontiveros stated that the applicable laws are the following:

The Revised Penal Code of 1930 now defines the felony of attempted bribery and corruption of public officials as follows:

Act No. 3815, An Act Revising the Penal Code and Other Penal Laws (December 8, 1930), Book II: Crimes and Penalties, Title Seven, Crimes Committed by Public Officers, Chapter Two, Malfeasance and Misfeasance in Office, Section Two. — Bribery Art. 210. Direct bribery. — Any public officer who shall agree to perform an act constituting a crime, in connection with the performance of this official duties, in consideration of any offer, promise, gift or present received by such officer, personally or through the mediation of another, shall suffer the penalty of prision mayor in its medium and maximum periods and a fine [of not less than the value of the gift and] not less than three times the value of the gift in addition to the penalty corresponding to the crime agreed upon, if the same shall have been committed. If the gift was accepted by the officer in consideration of the execution of an act which does not constitute a crime, xxxx and if said act shall not have been accomplished, the officer shall suffer the penalties of prision correccional, in its medium period and a fine of not less than twice the value of such gift. If the object for which the gift was received or promised was to make the public officer refrain from doing something which it was his official duty to do, he shall suffer the penalties of prision correccional in its maximum period and a fine [of not less than the value of the gift and] not less than three times the value of such gift. In addition to the penalties provided in the preceding paragraphs, the culprit shall suffer the penalty of special temporary disqualification. The provisions contained in the preceding paragraphs shall be made applicable to xxx any other persons performing public duties. (As amended by Batas Pambansa Blg. 872, June 10, 1985).

Art. 212. Corruption of public officials. — The same penalties imposed upon the officer corrupted, except those of disqualification and suspension, shall be imposed upon any person who shall have made the offers or promises or given the gifts or presents as described in the preceding articles.

Art. 6. Consummated, frustrated, and attempted felonies. — xxx There is an attempt when the offender commences the commission of a felony directly or over acts, and does not perform all the acts of execution which should produce the felony by reason of some cause or accident other than this own spontaneous desistance.

The Revised Rules of Court now also provides for the discipline of jurists and lawyers, as follows:

A.M. No. 01-8-10-SC, Amendment to Rule 140, Revised Rules of Court, Discipline of Judges and Justices: SECTION 1. How instituted. – Proceedings for the discipline of judges xxx Justices of the Court of Appeals xxx may be instituted motu proprio by the Supreme Court or upon a verified complaint, supported by affidavits of person xxx SEC. 8. Serious charges. – Serious charges include: 1. Bribery, direct or indirect; 2. Dishonesty and violations of the Anti-Graft and Corrupt Practices Law (R.A. No. 3019); 3. Gross misconduct constituting violations of the Code of Judicial Conduct; xxx SEC. 11. Sanctions. – A. If the respondent is guilty of a serious charge, any of the following sanctions may be imposed: 1. Dismissal from the service, forfeiture of all or part of the benefits as the Court may determine, and disqualification from reinstatement or appointment to any public office, including government-owned or controlled corporations. Provided, however, that the forfeiture of benefits shall in no case include accrued leave credits; 2. Suspension from office without salary and other benefits for more than three (3) but not exceeding six (6) months; or 3. A fine of more than P20,000.00 but not exceeding P40,000.00. Rule 139-B, Disbarment and Discipline of Attorneys: Section 1. How instituted. - Proceedings for disbarment, suspension or discipline of attorneys may be taken by the Supreme Court motu proprio, or by the Integrated Bar of the Philippines (IBP) upon the verified complaint of any person. The complaint shall state clearly and concisely the facts complained of and shall be supported by affidavits of persons having personal knowledge of the facts therein alleged and/or by such documents as may substantiate said facts.

R.A. 3019 provides as follows:

Republic Act No. 3019, Anti-Graft and Corrupt Practices Act Sec. 3. Corrupt practices of public officers. - In addition to acts or omissions of public officers already penalized by existing law, the following shall constitute corrupt practices of any public officer and are hereby declared to be unlawful: (a) Persuading, inducing or influencing another public officer to perform an act constituting a violation of rules and regulations duly promulgated by competent authority or an offense in connection with the official duties of the latter, or allowing himself to be persuaded, induced, or influenced to commit such violation or offense. (b) Directly or indirectly requesting or receiving any gift, present, share, percentage, or benefit, for himself or for any other person, in connection with any contract or transaction between the Government and any other part, wherein the public officer in his official capacity has to intervene under the law. (e) Causing any undue injury to any party, including the Government, or giving any private party any unwarranted benefits, advantage or preference in the discharge of his official administrative or judicial functions through manifest partiality, evident bad faith or gross inexcusable negligence. (k) Divulging valuable information of a confidential character, acquired by his office or by him on account of his official position to unauthorized persons, or releasing such information in advance of its authorized release date. The person giving the gift, present, share, percentage or benefit referred to in sub-paragraphs (b) and (c); or offering or giving to the public officer the employment mentioned in sub-paragraph (d); or urging the divulging or untimely release of the confidential information referred to in sub-paragraph (k) of this section shall, together with the offending public officer, be punished under Section nine of this Act and shall be permanently or temporarily disqualified in the discretion of the Court, from transacting business in any form with the Government. Sec. 4. Prohibition on private individuals. - (b) It shall be unlawful for any person knowingly to induce or cause any public official to commit any of the offenses defined in Section 3 hereof. Sec. 8. Dismissal due to unexplained wealth. - If in accordance with the provisions of Republic Act Numbered 1379, a public official has been found to have acquired during his incumbency, whether in his name or in the name of other persons, an amount of property and/or money manifestly out of proportion to his salary and to his other lawful income, that fact shall be a ground for dismissal or removal. Properties in the name of the spouse and unmarried children of such public official may be taken into consideration, when their acquisition through legitimate means cannot be satisfactorily shown. Bank deposits shall be taken into consideration in the enforcement of this section, notwithstanding any provision of law to the contrary. Sec. 9. Penalties for violations. - (a) Any public officer or private person committing any of the unlawful acts or omissions enumerated in Sections 3, 4, 5 and 6 of this Act shall be punished with imprisonment for not less than one year nor more than ten years, perpetual disqualification from public office, and confiscation or forfeiture in favor of the Government of any prohibited interest and unexplained wealth manifestly out of proportion to his salary and other lawful income.

==== Application to this case ====
Justice Sabio informed Philippine media that he was offered P 10 million (through a Makati businessman, which he rejected) to recuse himself from the GSIS–Meralco case, which was decided by the 8th Division's Justice Vicente Roxas, the designated ponente, with the concurring opinions of Justices Bienvenido Reyes and Antonio Bruselas. Roxas was transferred from the 9th Division when the case was pending. Sabio revealed to the media that: “It turned out that he was brokering for Meralco.” Sabio appeared on a TV interview by GMA Network reporter Carlo Lorenzo in his chambers.

Cagayan de Oro businessman Francis Roa de Borja, in his July 31, 2008 affidavit, swore that: "when he asked what it would take for him to resist the government offer, Sabio's reply was: “Fifty million (pesos)"; Sabio wanted to remain as acting chairman of the 9th Division because he was up to something; that Sabio consulted his other colleagues in the CA and they told him that he was in the right and should stick to his guns; that was then Sabio told Borja about the offer of unnamed government officials for a promotion at the SC and money for a favorable ruling for GSIS."

De Borja accused Sabio of twisting the facts: "No, I never said that. If you know Manolo Lopez -- he is somewhat aristocratic -- he would be the last person to wait for somebody in the car, and they did not know that he was abroad at that time. I said in my affidavit that he told me his wife would be waiting for him in the car and he says now that Manolo was waiting in my car..."

De Borja stated that he was ready to face a charge of perjury and to take a lie detector test with Sabio before competent foreign experts and together: "It’s a free country, let him file it and we’ll see. I’m prepared. The moment I signed my affidavit, obviously I considered the consequences, so I wouldn’t have made up a story. And my third comment is he is a lawyer and a justice. He knows that a lie detector test is not admissible as evidence, so why is he asking for it?’’ De Borja was interviewed and appeared at ABS-CBN News Channel's (ANC) Dateline Philippines, and he repeated his media statements: "No, definitely not...He [Sabio] says that Manolo was waiting for me in my car. I never said it. And if you know Manolo...Can you imagine somebody like Manolo being made to wait in a car? Di ba, yung pagka aristocratic ni Manolo, maghihintay sa kotse? The fact is, he was abroad."

Meanwhile, a shadowy group, "Tanglaw ng Bayan," paid for an advertisement in a Metro Manila newspaper, appealing "that the CA justices not be subjected to malicious imputations just to advance the agenda of powerful interests, and to allow the CA to "sort out its internal issues." In 2007, it also petitioned the Department of Trade and Industry (DTI) and the Senate to probe the "Hello Pappy" scandal.

On July 31, 2008, after a rare 3-hour, closed-door En Banc session attended by 64 CA Justices presided over by P.J. Vasquez, Jr., the CA Clerk of Court Teresita Marigomen announced the appellate court's resolution:

- "that they will refer the investigation of the propriety of action of concerned justices to the Supreme Court through the Office of the Court Administrator";
- "they will leave the matter on the validity of the Meralco decision to the parties, to take whatever steps they may deem necessary after all the allegations"; and,
- "they will refer the issue of the conflict on rules to an internal committee within the appellate court."

Chief Justice Reynato Puno ordered all records of the case be delivered forthwith to the high court, and the Supreme Court Public Information Office OIC said all magistrates of the high court would deliberate on the case on August 5.

Justice Roxas challenged the En Banc meeting as a “disguised investigation” of the 8th Division's judgment on the Meralco case, further alleging that under the Internal Rules of the Court of Appeals, a case followed the ponente to whatever division the ponente went: “Besides, all hearings in the Court of Appeals are recorded and the members of the 8th Division only need the transcripts of the hearing or the memoranda, briefs, comments and replies of the parties—which are all written.”

Sabio, however, told media that he has text messages plus phone call records as evidence to prove that Francis Roa de Borja bribed him.

Sabio's former client (1978), Evelyn Clavano, a Cagayan de Oro resident, gave media, on August 1, an affidavit saying that: "Francis de Borja requested me if I have the cell phone number of Justice Jose L. Sabio Jr. He related that because he is very close to the Lopezes of Meralco, he wanted to call him (Sabio) regarding his possible inhibition in a certain Meralco case, wherein he was designated as a substitute member of the division vice a justice who was temporarily on-leave by reason of sickness. He further said that the Lopezes desire that the same Justice, with whom the Lopezes are more comfortable, sit in the division. So, I gave Francis de Borja the cell phone number of Justice Jose L. Sabio Jr. through a business card."

Meralco chair Manolo Lopez, in a press conference on August 2, denied any involvement in the alleged bribery attempt: “I categorically and vehemently deny the allegations of Justice Jose Sabio. Mind you, I do not have the habit of waiting in the car for anybody except my wife. The [allegations are] malicious and pure fabrication. I am a resident of Rockwell Center. I know Francis, but I have not authorized him or anybody to make representations for [me on] any matter that involves cases of Meralco and the Lopez family. We have retainers and lawyers to handle legal matters. I was out of the country when the alleged meeting between Francis and Justice Sabio took place. I was in the United States for a medical checkup and returned on July 13." Lopez's officials showed media tickets for his departure on June 27 and his arrival on July 13.

The Lopez group led by First Philippine Holdings Corp. has a 33.47% share interest in Meralco, while the Philippine government financial institutions own 33.32%. Other shareholders hold 34.21%. Meralco said the government share is, to wit: GSIS, 22.05%; Social Security System, 5.52%; Land Bank of the Philippines, 4.41%; Philippine Health Insurance Corp., 0.17%; and the Home Development Mutual Fund or Pag-IBIG, 0.17%.

===== CA chambers press conference =====
Sabio, on August 1, First Friday, held a press conference in his CA [chambers, and stated to the media:

...I expect matters to get worse because I am up against the billions of the Lopezes. But that Mr. de Borja would have the nerve to make these lies, under oath, is utterly disgusting when it was he who came to me with the offer of the bribe. He [de Borja] further said that the Lopezes desire that the same justice, with whom the Lopezes are more comfortable, sit in the division. Mr. de Borja called me, so suddenly, and after having had no contact [with him] for almost a year. At that point, he [de Borja] mentioned the impasse between Justice Bienvenido Reyes and myself. Then he [de Borja] explained that he was there to offer me a win-win situation. He said, Justice, we have P10 million. At that point, I was shocked that he had a very low regard for me. He was treating me like there was a price on my person. I could not describe my feelings. I was stunned. I cannot in conscience agree to that [offer to bribe me]. The Lopezes will do everything possible using their money and power to discredit me. This is just the beginning. I know that they will not stop at doing everything to discredit my integrity.”

===== Jurisdictional issue =====
The internal strife and open quarrel over signature space on a judgment pushed the appellate court to the edge and is now at the center of a maelstrom. The Government Service Insurance System (GSIS), raised a legal point, challenging the 8th CA Division's judgment dismissing GSIS's petition filed with the Securities and Exchange Commission (Philippines) against Meralco. The certiorari and injunction CA lawsuit was raffled off to the CA's 9th Division chaired by Justice Bienvenido Reyes (on leave at the time). A special raffle designated Reyes’ replacement, Justice Jose Sabio (as chair). With Justices Vicente Roxas and Myrna Vidal as members, the 9th Division heard the case. (The GSIS moved to recuse Roxas on account of reports that "he met with Meralco lawyers on the day a temporary restraining order [TRO] was issued by the CA, barring the SEC from taking jurisdiction over the GSIS complaint against Meralco.")

Sabio's chairmanship issue with Reyes over the Special Ninth Division was overtaken by a July 4, 2008, reorganization at the Court of Appeals. Reyes and Roxas ended up in the 8th Division, which finally resolved the case in favor of the Lopez group on July 23. Sabio was reassigned as chairman of the 6th Division. Sabio later complained that Roxas penned the decision even before either side had submitted their arguments.

Justice Reyes failed to assume the chairmanship of the 9th Division in place of Sabio, and the CA's 8th Division, chaired by Reyes and with ponente Justices Roxas and Apolinario Bruselas as members, forthwith promulgated the challenged judgment in favor of Meralco. GSIS called the ruling a “patent nullity for such dismissal [of the GSIS case before the SEC] was not even prayed for by Meralco in its petition with the Court of Appeals.”

P.J. Vasquez wrote Justices Sabio and Vidal that, as members of their newly reconstituted 8th Division, they are not very familiar with the case. Vasquez earlier granted Sabio a verbal go-signal to proceed in hearing the June 23 oral argument. Vasquez reiterated that "Sabio’s 9th Division, since it issued a temporary restraining order (TRO), and its members heard and participated in the June 23 hearing, should “sign and resolve” the case. To allow the new division of Justice B.L. Reyes as chairman, Justice Roxas, as ponente, and Justice Bruselas, Jr. as the third member, the resolution of the pending incidents in the case will be participated in by two (2) members who were not present and did not hear the arguments during the hearing on the injunctive relief...”

==== Certiorari ====
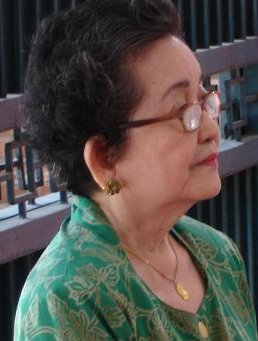
Justice Carolina Grino-Aquino, Chair of the Bribery Panel.

GSIS, on August 13, 2008, in a 65-page certiorari petition, asked the Supreme Court to nullify the CA judgment that prevented the SEC from case intervention, "considering the SC probe is still ongoing." It argued that the Special 9th Division should have ruled on the case.

=== Investigation ===
==== A.M. No. 08-8-11-CA ====
The Supreme Court, on August 4, created a panel composed of 3 retired Supreme Court justices to investigate the scandal. The High Court's resolution "A.M. No. 08-8-11-C, August 4, 2008 - Re: Letter of Presiding Justice Conrado M. Vasquez, Jr. re: CA-G.R. SP No. 103692 (Antonio Rosete, et al. v. SEC, et al.) directed chair Associate Justice Carolina Griño-Aquino, and Members Justices Flerida Ruth Romero and Romeo Callejo Jr. to conduct daily hearings from August 7, and submit the final report before August 21. In the docketed administrative matter, Reynato Puno, Consuelo Ynares-Santiago and Antonio Carpio recused for legal reasons. The SC PIO officer announced that: "The hearing will be opened to the public and to the media. It's going to be a regular hearing, like the oral argument, except that there will be no cameras inside the hearing room.”

Joker Arroyo criticized the High Court's ruling, saying it should be, as sitting Justices investigate the case instead, since: "Delegating the investigation to a panel of retired justices who in turn will submit their findings to the high court for review and determination [is] akin to a trial by commissioners."

=== Judgment ===
After the Panel of Investigators conducted hearings from August 8 to 23, 2008, it submitted on September 4 its 59-pages Report to the Court en banc. The panel found (page 44): “the investigation has revealed irregularities and improprieties committed by the Court of Appeals Justices in connection with the MERALCO case, CA-G.R. SP No. 103692, which are detrimental to the proper administration of justice and damaging to the institutional integrity, independence and public respect for the Judiciary.”

On September 9, the Supreme Court of the Philippines rendered a 58-page per curiam judgment, in this way:

"WHEREFORE, the Court RESOLVES as follows: (1) Associate Justice Vicente Q. Roxas is found guilty of multiple violations of the canons of the Code of Judicial Conduct, grave misconduct, dishonesty, undue interest and conduct prejudicial to the best interest of the service, and is DISMISSED from the service, with FORFEITURE of all benefits, except accrued leave credits if any, with prejudice to his re-employment in any branch or service of the government including government-owned and controlled corporations; (2) Associate Justice Jose L. Sabio, Jr. is found guilty of simple misconduct and conduct unbecoming of a justice of the Court of Appeals and is SUSPENDED for two (2) months without pay, with a stern warning that a repetition of the same or similar acts will warrant a more severe penalty; (3) Presiding Justice Conrado M. Vasquez, Jr. is SEVERELY REPRIMANDED for his failure to act promptly and decisively in order to avert the incidents that damaged the image of the Court of Appeals, with a stern warning that a repetition of the same or similar acts will warrant a more severe penalty; (4) Associate Justice Bienvenido L. Reyes is found guilty of simple misconduct with mitigating circumstance and is REPRIMANDED, with a stern warning that a repetition of the same or similar acts will warrant a more severe penalty; (5) Associate Justice Myrna Dimaranan-Vidal is found guilty of conduct unbecoming a Justice of the Court of Appeals and is ADMONISHED to be more circumspect in the discharge of her judicial duties. (6) PCGG Chairman Camilo L. Sabio’s act to influence the judgment of a member of the Judiciary in a pending case is hereby referred to the Bar Confidant for appropriate action (7) Justice Jose L. Sabio, Jr.’s charge against Mr. Francis R. De Borja for attempted bribery of a member of the Judiciary is hereby referred to the Department of Justice for appropriate action. This Decision shall take effect immediately."

In a 33-page per curiam resolution, the Supreme Court on October 15, 2008, denied with finality the motions for reconsideration of all but one of the Court of Appeals (CA) justices, including businessman Mr. Francis de Borja's.

"...Apart from the above-mentioned separate concurring and dissenting opinion of one Justice, the Justices’ votes and inhibitions remained unchanged. WHEREFORE, the Motion for Reconsideration dated September 24, 2008 filed by Justice Vicente Q. Roxas; Motion for Reconsideration dated September 15, 2008 filed by Justice Jose L. Sabio, Jr.; Motion for Reconsideration dated September 24, 2008 filed by Presiding Justice Conrado M. Vasquez, Jr.; A Plea for Compassion and Clemency dated September 22, 2008 filed by Justice Myrna Dimaranan Vidal; and Motion for Reconsideration dated September 26, 2008 filed by Mr. Francis de Borja are DENIED WITH FINALITY."

=== CA covenant and DOJ probe ===
On September 15, 2008, Chief Justice Reynato Puno led the moral enhancement covenant signing by the Justices of the Court of Appeals' chairpersons of the 23 divisions, and the members of all divisions, in simultaneous ceremonies at Manila, Cebu, and Cagayan de Oro. The covenant incorporated a list of institutional reforms, an enhancement program, and mandated "the revision of the Internal Rules of the Court of Appeals (IRCA), appointment of an Ombudsman at the CA, caseload reduction, the electronic raffling of cases filed, the appointment of a “Justice of the Day, and the “CA One-Stop-Shop.”

Accordingly, the Department of Justice (Philippines) panel, chaired by Undersecretary Ernesto Pineda, issued subpoenas to Francis de Borja, Justice Jose Sabio, his daughter Silvia Jo Guiltiano Sabio and Evelyn Clavano for the September 19 preliminary investigation.

=== House Resolution 705 ===
Meanwhile, 2 pro-administration congressmen, Masbate Rep. Antonio Kho and Nueva Ecija Rep. Joseph Gilbert Violago, on August 4 called for a House of Representatives probe on the bribery case. Accordingly, House Resolution 705 was filed by Manila Representative Bienvenido Abante Jr., petitioning Congress, through the committees on energy and justice, to probe the bribery case.

=== Judicial corruption ===
On January 25, 2005, and on December 10, 2006, the Philippines Social Weather Stations released the results of its two surveys on corruption in the judiciary; it published that: a) like in 1995, 1/4 of lawyers said many/very many judges are corrupt. But (49%) stated that a judge received bribes, just 8% of lawyers admitted they reported the bribery, because they could not prove it. [Tables 8-9]; judges, however, said, just 7% call many/very many judges as corrupt[Tables 10-11];b) "Judges see some corruption; proportions who said - many/very many corrupt judges or justices: 17% in reference to RTC judges, 14% to MTC judges, 12% to Court of Appeals justices, 4% i to Shari'a Court judges, 4% to Sandiganbayan justices and 2% in reference to Supreme Court justices [Table 15].

==== CA controversies ====
Created on February 1, 1936, the Philippine Court of Appeals was initially composed of Justice Pedro Concepcion as the first Presiding Judge and 10 Appellate Judges appointed by the President with the consent of the Commission on Appointments of the National Assembly. In March 1938, the appellate Judges were named Justices and their number increased from 11 to 15, with 3 divisions of 5 under Commonwealth Act No. 259. On December 24, 1941, there were 19 Justices under Executive Order No. 395. On February 23, 1995, R.A. No. 7902 expanded the jurisdiction of the Court, effective March 18, 1995. On December 30, 1996, R.A. No. 8246 created six (6) more divisions in the Court, thereby increasing its membership from 51 to 69 Justices (additional divisions - 3 for Visayas and 3 for Mindanao, the Court's regionalization).

The Supreme Court of the Philippines, on March 21, 2008, upon recommendation of the investigator, Bernardo P. Pardo, dismissed Philippine Court of Appeals Justice Elvi John Asuncion for gross ignorance of the law and delaying motions for consideration. Asuncion was charged of receiving money placed in “2 gym bags delivered to his office.” The Supreme Court, however, found no substantial evidence of bribery, but it dismissed him for gross ignorance of the law for his issuance of an October 30, 2001, resolution in the case between Philippine National Bank, the National Labor Relations Commission and Erlinda Archinas. He was only the 2nd Court of Appeals jurist to be dismissed, since the first firing in Philippine judicial history of CA Justice Demetrio G. Demetria, for interceding in the DOJ drug case of Yu Yuk Lai.

The CA thereafter became the center of controversy after Chief Justice Reynato Puno ordered an investigation of the so-called "Dirty Dozen," particularly on the alleged “sale” of "Temporary Restraining Orders" (Injunction, restraining order abuse). On August 18, 2007, Briccio Joseph Boholst, president of IBP — Cebu City Chapter, opposed the abolition of the CA in Cebu City, for it will cause inconvenience for both litigants and lawyers. Supreme Court Associate Justice Ruben Reyes was tasked to investigate and submit a recommendation to the High Tribunal because of the alleged massive graft and corruption of justices, especially in the issuance of temporary restraining orders (TRO's).

On April 3, 2007, Philippine Court of Appeals Presiding Justice Ruben Reyes (now S.C. Justice) ordered an investigation and a regular auditing and inventory of temporary restraining orders (TROs) issued by the 69 CA Justices. Reyes stated: “I will order a monthly or quarterly inventory of TROs, for transparency and to watch the movements of the so-called Dirty Dozen [the 12 most corrupt CA justices].” Reynato Puno said that Ombudsman Merceditas Gutierrez had not yet submitted the list and the Supreme Court was waiting for its delivery amid her formal investigation against the “Dirty Dozen.”

On February 1, 2008, the Court celebrated its 72nd Anniversary.

== Reactions ==
- Government Service Insurance System chief Garcia, on July 31, 2008, asked Justices Vicente Roxas and Bienvenido Reyes to resign and save the CA institution amid plans to file criminal and administrative lawsuits. Garcia accused both Justices of a “Meralco switcheroo" in the case against GSIS: “The sordid details of Meralco’s behind-the-scenes maneuverings as narrated by Justice Sabio merely put in public display the contempt the Lopezes have for the law. Lady Justice lies bleeding on the ground, and those who have blood in their hands must be made to answer for this dastardly crime! I call on all Filipinos, especially my colleagues in the noble practice of law, to rise up in unison to condemn these moves by Meralco to protect its interest at the expense of what is right and just."
- Senator Kiko Pangilinan, in a statement, asked the High Court to "act swiftly to get to the bottom of the scandal and immediately punish the guilty. The SC must show no hesitation whatsoever in pursuing this controversy. The entire judiciary's reputation is tarnished by this scandal, and the swiftness with which the SC responds will determine whether the damage is temporary and minimal or if it will be massive and irreparable. The SC must respond with clear and convincing resoluteness by dismissing from the service the CA justices involved in the irregularities, if the evidence warrants it."
- Senate Minority Leader Aquilino Pimentel, Jr., Sabio's distant relative, said, "Whoever tried to bribe the CA should be made to account for the crime (Kung sino ang nag-offer ng bribe kay Justice Sabio, dapat ihabla kasi krimen yon e. Of course yung sinsabi ng abogado, dapat pakinggan din. Ang sama ng dating sa taongbayan because kumbaga, right at the doorstep na ng Supreme Court ito e. It's not only the national, but also the international reputation of the judiciary that could be compromised). No formal investigations have been conducted regarding alleged irregularities in the judiciary, particularly in the Court of Appeals, because witnesses are afraid to testify against the so-called “hoodlums in robes".
- Senator Edgardo Angara said: "Of course, my God, when you say that the second-highest level of the judiciary in the Philippines is corrupt and bribable, who's going to be safe investing here or even travelling here?"
- Senator Francis Escudero said: "There were enough laws to deal with the controversy. Besides, inter-branch courtesy dictates that the Senate would not meddle with the internal affairs of the judiciary. Supreme Court ang may jurisdiction to discipline erring judges and justices."
- Senator Loren Legarda, a former broadcaster of Lopez-owned ABS-CBN, said: "The gravity of the accusation raised by Sabio was so damaging to the justice system and that they cannot be left unresolved. Sabio's revelation calls for everyone to have an open mind, and to come to a conclusion only after a dispassionate and objective appreciation of evidence. The appropriate criminal, civil or administrative cases must be filed against whoever will be found to have transgressed the law. The judiciary should be above suspicion if it will be effective in dispensing justice. We cannot have one branch of government being diminished by scandals like this."
- The Senators jointly stated that: "Regardless of the outcome of the GSIS–Meralco case at the CA, the senators also said it is clear the case can no longer be heard by Sabio since his fairness has already been tarnished by the various allegations."
- Fr. Joaquin G. Bernas, dean emeritus of the Ateneo Law School, told the Philippine Daily Inquirer that: “The allegations will not do the judiciary any good but the investigation of the Supreme Court will. I don't know the facts. I consider (Sabio) to be an honest man.”
- Ateneo Law Dean Cesar L. Villanueva vouched for Sabio, saying "the CA justice is one of the well-respected faculty members of the Ateneo Law School."
- The Ateneo Law School student body, per student council president Jess Lopez, stated: "We, his current students, stand as witnesses to his fairness and impartiality, which are beyond reproach, and the genuine manner in which he implores us to stand against all forms of corruption in all aspects of law and governance. The respect we have for Sabio is derived not only from his remarkable skill in teaching, but likewise from his indubitable sense of justice, moral conduct, and service to society. Sabio’s reputation is that of being a “professor of utmost integrity who will not and cannot be fazed by unjust and wrongful considerations.”
- Alberto Lim, executive director of the Makati Business Club (MBC), said: "If Sabio is telling the truth, the MBC would be dismayed at Meralco's moves to bribe a CA justice. On the other hand, if De Borja is telling the truth about Sabio's P50 million bribe demand, it would be a big setback to the judiciary." Sabio said that De Borja told him "the MBC was happy with his earlier decision to sign a temporary restraining order (TRO) favoring Meralco." Lim, however, clarified that De Borja is not its member.
- Jovito Salonga, 88, Bantay Katarungan or Sentinel of Justice chair, said: “It is true that there is bribery in the CA. It should already be stopped. The bribery should be exposed. It should be the beginning of legal reforms in our system of justice. The lawyer-members and even the “student monitors” of Bantay Katarungan know who these personalities are and how the corruption works in the appellate court. They know who these people are. We, in Bantay Katarungan... have been exposing and underscoring the need for reforms in our system of justice. We have written to the Judicial and Bar Council and from time to time the appointing power on the need for reforms in specific instances not only in the CA but in the other courts.”
- Rufus Rodriguez, Cagayan de Oro Opposition congressman and former law school dean, said: “This may be an initial black eye for the Court of Appeals...but if (Sabio) just remained silent nothing will happen.”
- Joker Arroyo said: “This is a very good opportunity to clean the CA because, like cancer, this is now a severe case that must not be allowed to worsen. The bribery issue involving CA Associate Justice Jose Sabio and the Manila Electric Co. (Meralco) was a blessing in disguise because people would finally be made aware of what had been going on in the judiciary. We cannot just have remedial measures; we need to cleanse the CA because (corruption) has been vulgar. This is corruption right in their front door. Lawyers know all of these but the people don’t. With this scandal, it’s like a case that only lawyers talked about before had been opened. But nobody wanted to come forward because they were afraid of the justices and if nothing happened to their complaint, they would only suffer along with their cases and their clients. Now that this has been opened, it is now up to the Supreme Court to decide (what to do). Why? Because it has been criticizing corruption in the executive department, it complains against delay in the decisions of lower courts; now we have an actual case: there was an (alleged) offer to a justice. Why does (De Borja) have an unusual interest in this case? Many are involved. What happens now is that the SC should decide on it firmly. Once it is within the judiciary, nobody can interfere except the SC; only the SC can discipline them. We (in the Senate) cannot intervene and so (they) must resolve this.”
- Camilo Sabio, Presidential Commission on Good Government (PCGG) Chairman, and elder brother of Justice Jose Sabio said: "The CA justice will have a “good fight. I believe he’s on the right side and I have trust in him. I’ve known him for a long time. He’s my brother. He’s a man of integrity.”
- CBCPNews, of the Catholic Bishops' Conference of the Philippines, said "the Ateneo de Manila Law School found the bribery allegations against Sabio as “incredible.”
- Consumer group National Association of Electricity Consumers for Reform (Nasecore), meanwhile, said "Sabio’s revelations affirmed that Meralco does not play by the books on court and regulatory cases it is involved in. There were times in the past that we felt that Meralco had control of the Energy Regulatory Commission (ERC) because of so many ERC rules that were patently biased in favor of the power company. So the damning recounting made by no less than a respected justice of the Court of Appeals on how the minions of Meralco operate should give the public a very clear picture of what kind of adversary Nasecore has been facing in our lonesome in the past.” Nasecore won a S.C. case against Meralco for a refund of P827 million, on August 16, 2006.
- Senators, on August 12, 2008, called for the ouster or resignation of Presidential Commission on Good Government (PCGG) Chair Camilo Sabio, for allegedly interfering with the GSIS–Meralco case handled by his brother CA Justice J. Sabio. Francis Escudero stated: Sabio “must go not only for intervening but [also] allowing a classic case of money that was stolen not once but twice.” Richard Gordon said Sabio “should explain where the Marcos money went.” Alan Peter Cayetano said: “If [Camilo Sabio] cannot clean up his own backyard, I’m wondering why he would step out of his way to intervene in the case being handled by his brother. Was he acting on his own or was he instructed by someone else?” Kiko Pangilinan stated: “The act of the brother of Justice Sabio may be considered a criminal act. It appears to be an attempt to corrupt a public official under the Revised Penal Code. An investigation must be undertaken and the necessary criminal charges filed.” Manny Villar said, "Sabio’s interference in the CA case was “unethical” and should be quickly looked into." Akbayan Rep. Risa Hontiveros demanded Sabio’s immediate resignation for purported violation of the Anti-Graft and Corrupt Practices Act: "persuading, inducing or influencing another public officer to perform an act constituting a violation of rules and regulations duly promulgated by competent authority. There should be no ifs or buts because he has already compromised the integrity of his office, which was ironically established to correct corruption and institute reforms for good government."

== See also ==
- 2008 in the Philippines
- Chief Justice of the Supreme Court of the Philippines
- Constitution of the Philippines
- Philippine legal codes
