= Meralco Theater =

Theater in Pasig, Philippines

Coordinates: 14°35′24″N 121°03′50″E

- Interactive map of Meralco Theater
- Former names: Meralco Auditorium
- Address: Meralco Building, Ortigas Center; Ugong, Pasig, Metro Manila; Philippines
- Owner: Meralco
- Capacity: 1,500
- Type: Theater

Construction
- Opened: March 22, 1969

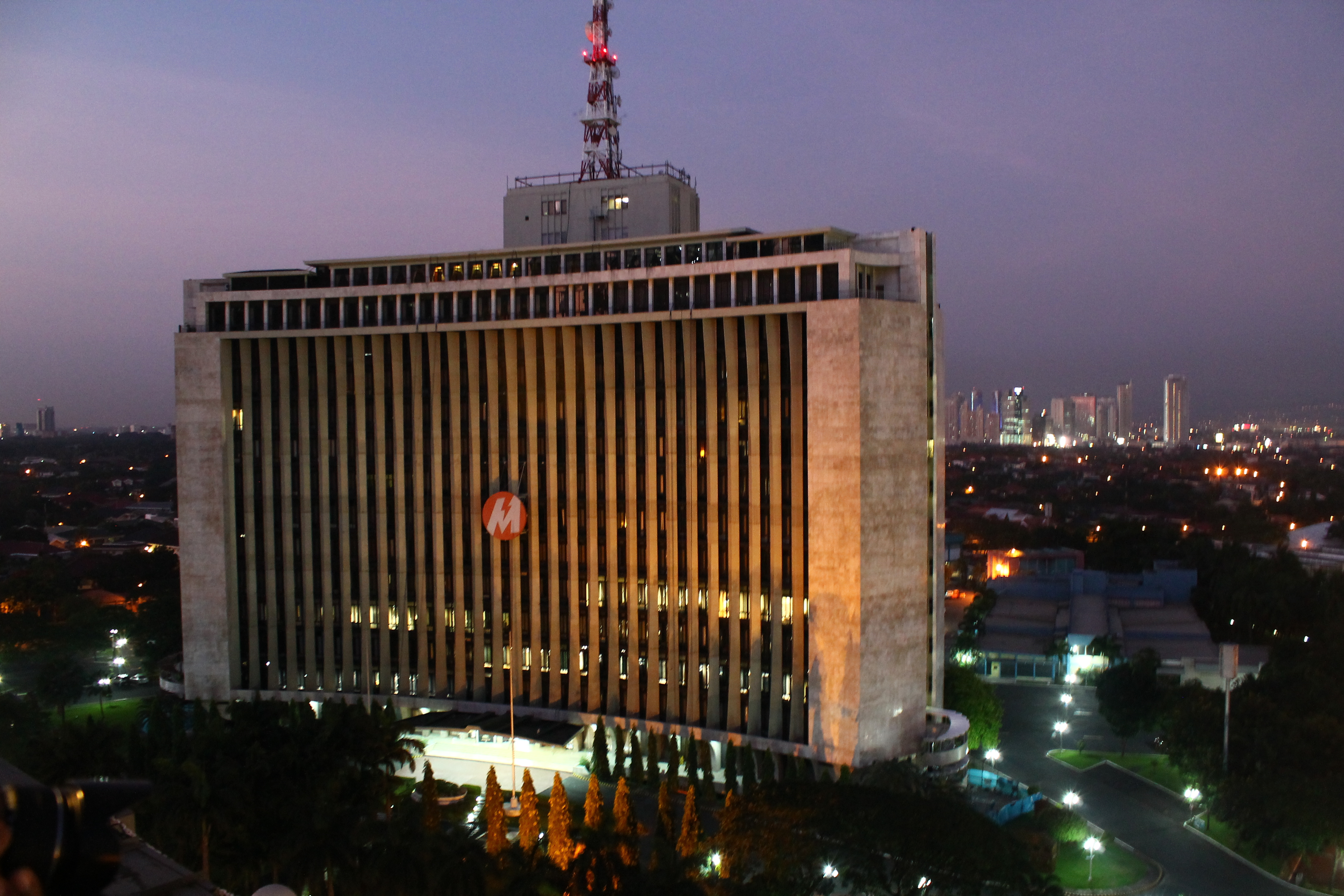
Meralco Theater hosted within the Meralco Building

Meralco Theater is a theater located at the compound of Meralco, Ortigas Avenue in Pasig, Philippines. It used to be known as the Meralco Auditorium.

It seats over 1,500 people and hosts concerts, plays, musicals and events.

== History ==
The Meralco Theater was inaugurated on March 22, 1969. It was designed by Filipino architect José María Zaragoza and forms part of the larger Meralco Building, which was completed a little earlier. The 14-story building, theater and adjoining buildings form are part of the Ortigas Center CBD.

The graduation ceremony of politician Imee Marcos took place at the theater, according to University of the Philippines Cebu history professor Madrileña de la Cerna.

In 2024, Meralco Theater completed an interior renovation.

From October 2025 to April 2026, the theater has been the production location for TV5's musical countdown-variety show, Vibe.
