= Meralco Building =

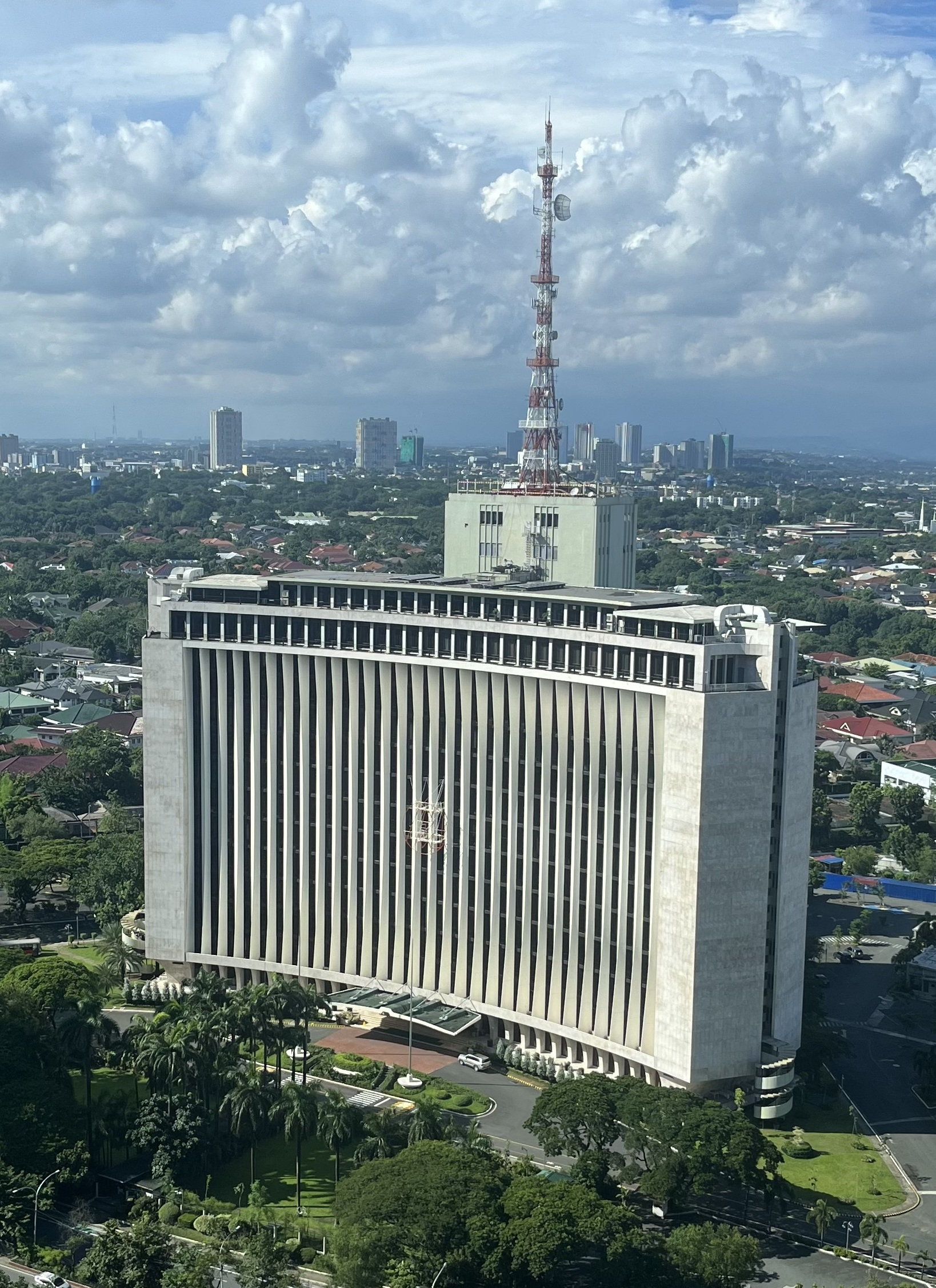
- Interactive map of the Meralco Building area
- Alternative names: Meralco López Building
- Etymology: Meralco; Eugenio López Sr. (since 1969)

General information
- Status: Completed
- Location: Ortigas, Pasig, Metro Manila, Philippines
- Completed: 1965
- Owner: Meralco

Technical details
- Floor count: 14

Design and construction
- Architect: José María Zaragoza

The Meralco López Building, or simply the Meralco Building, is a skyscraper in Pasig, Metro Manila.

== History ==
The Meralco Building was built in 1965. At the time of its completion, it was one of the largest and tallest commercial buildings in the Philippines. The Meralco Theater was inaugurated within the Meralco Building on March 22, 1969.

On December 2, 2015, the Meralco Building was declared as an architectural legacy of a Philippine National Artist by the Cultural Center of the Philippines.

== Architecture and design ==
José María Zaragoza designed the 14-storey Meralco building. Its facade is defined by a series of tapering mullions, which also serve the purpose of deflecting sunlight and sound. Its ends are marble-covered walls.
