= Charles M. Swift =

American businessman (1854–1929)

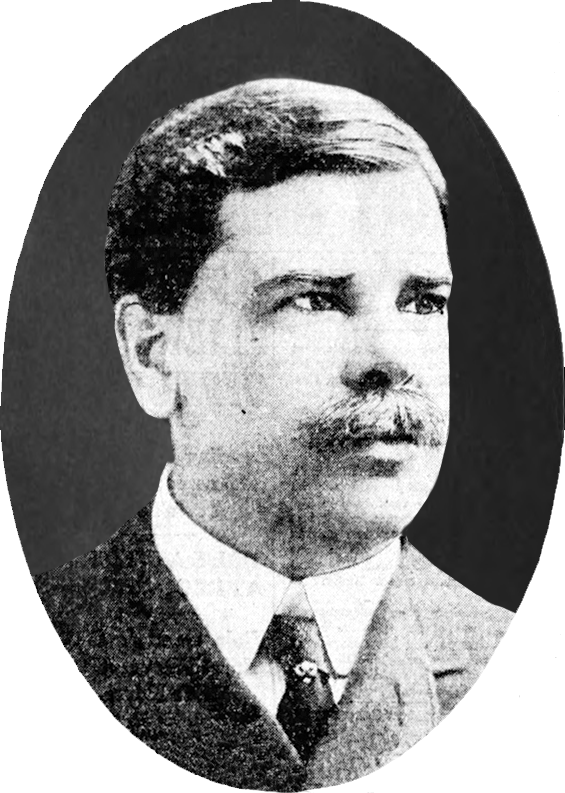
- Born: March 19, 1854; Middlebury, Vermont, U.S.
- Died: June 21, 1929 (aged 75); Ferrisburg, Vermont, U.S.
- Occupations: Lawyer, businessman
- Known for: Founding Meralco, an electrical utility in the Philippines, and several railroads in the Philippines and Michigan

Signature
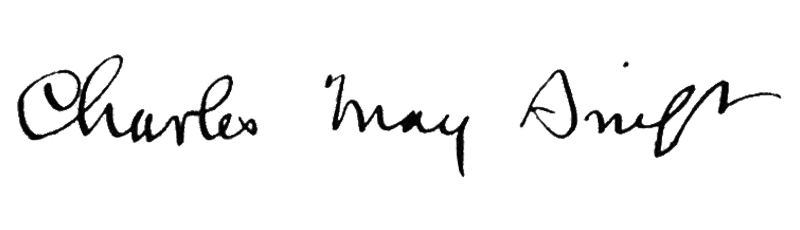

Charles May Swift (March 19, 1854 – June 21, 1929) was the American businessman who founded Meralco, the largest electric utility and one of the leading companies of the Philippines, founded as the Manila Electric Railroad and Light Company, composed largely of Detroit and Pittsburgh capital. Swift also founded the Philippine Railway Company Inc. (now known as Panay Railways) and several other railroads in Michigan.

== Early life ==
On March 19, 1854, Swift was born in Middlebury, Vermont. He was the second child of George Sedgwick Swift and Louise May. In 1856, his parents decided to move to Detroit. He graduated from Detroit High School, in 1870. He studied law in his uncle's office, practised stenography and court reporting. By 1877, he was admitted to the bar.

== Career ==
He practiced law until about 1893, after which he became a promoter of surface-railroad enterprises. He was involved with building and operating electric trams and steam railroads in Michigan, particularly the Wyandotte & Detroit River Railway and Detroit & Port Huron Shore Line. All of these properties were eventually acquired by the Detroit United Railway. He was also president and director of the Nipigon Mining & Lands Co., of Detroit. He made his fortune in mining.

In 1903, backed by New York City-based utility and security firm J. G. White & Co. and engineering firm Westinghouse, Church, Kerr and Co. Swift was awarded the bid to construct Manila's light, power and electric railway service. The Westinghouse group was a subsidiary of the Westinghouse Electric & Manufacturing Company. He was contracted by the United States' Philippine Commission and municipal board of Manila to purchase the city's old tramway. In March 1903, articles of incorporation were filed in the State of New Jersey by the Manila Railways and Light Co. with a capital of $1,000,000. He became president of the company which was later renamed Manila Electric Railroad and Light Co., Ltd. in 1905.

Other railroads in the Philippines that he was involved with building include, the Manila Suburban Railways Company extending the system to Fort McKinley and Pasig. This franchise merged with the Manila Electric, Rail, and Light Company in 1919, when it was then shortened to the familiar branding, Meralco. He also organized the Philippine Railway Company for the concession of railways in the islands of Cebu, Panay and Negros, chiefly in districts that produce sugar and hemp for export. The conditions were substantially the same as those imposed in Manila.

He retired in 1925 after selling his railroad interests.

== Family and personal life ==
Charles May Swift was married twice. In 1886, he married Clara Buel Trowbridge, daughter of an American Revolution veteran, in Michigan. She died in 1910. Later on, he married Anna Jessica Stewart Sylvester, the daughter of politician John Wolcott Stewart of Middlebury, Vermont in 1913. He had no children. He lived for many years in Grosse Pointe, Michigan.

In 1918, he was elected to the Board of Trustees of Middlebury College Middlebury College and he bequeathed US$200,000 to the college, to be paid after his wife dies and the life trust for her benefit was dissolved.

He owned two vacation homes in Vermont, both of which still exist. One on Lake Champlain in Ferrisburg, Vermont, he named Grosse Pointe after his hometown in Michigan. The other in Middlebury is currently an inn known as the Swift House Inn.

== Death ==
In 1929, Swift became ill and withdrew all his money from the stock market in order to set up family trusts. On June 21, he died on his yacht at Lake Champlain before the Wall Street crash of 1929, thus inadvertently saving his fortune from that financial disaster. He was interred in Middlebury Cemetery.

His papers are at the Henry Sheldon Museum of Vermont History in Middlebury, VT as part of the Stewart-Swift Research Center, along with papers and documents from his and his second wife's family.

== See also ==
- Meralco
- Tranvía
