= John F. Cotton Corporate Wellness Center =

Private hospital in Pasig, Philippines

Geography
- Location: Pasig, Philippines
- Coordinates: 14°35′23.0″N 121°03′52.9″E

Organization
- Care system: Private
- Type: Corporate Wellness Center, Tertiary

Services
- Standards: Philippine Department of Health

History
- Founded: 1964, became a corporate wellness center in 2004

Links
- Lists: Hospitals in the Philippines

The John F. Cotton Corporate Wellness Center or John F. Cotton Hospital Center for Corporation Wellness, formerly known only as the John F. Cotton Hospital (JFCH), is a privately owned hospital located inside the compound of Meralco, a major electric company in the Philippines.

Being a private facility, it is situated inside the Meralco Center at Ortigas Avenue in Pasig. The transformation of the JFCH into an integrated corporate wellness center made the Manila Electric Company the first corporation in the Philippines to institutionalize the implementation of such a program.

== History ==
=== Beginnings ===
For 40 years since its conception as a private hospital, the John F. Cotton Hospital had been labeled as the healthcare custodian of Meralco employees. It was a tertiary hospital that catered medical and health care needs to employees. Its fair market value was estimated to be at P5,519,190 in March 2003.

=== Transformation ===
The JFCH was formally transformed into a Corporate Wellness Center (CWC) on September 16, 2004 in order to continue securing the welfare and well being of Meralco’s 5,000 employees. The change was enacted by Manuel M. Lopez, the chairman and chief executive officer of Meralco, and was designed to prolong the vision of Lopez’s father, Eugenio Lopez, Sr. (first Filipino owner of Meralco), and is in line with the company's policy of securing the welfare and well-being of its personnel. The change also put into use a new concept in employee healthcare, which is preventive rather than curative. The edifice of the new Corporate Wellness Center was officially inaugurated on July 20, 2005.

=== Implementation ===
The result of the implementation of the change resulted to the outsourcing of John F. Cotton Hospital’s in-patient services to The Medical City, a hospital in close proximity to the Meralco headquarters. This outsourcing of in-patient services to The Medical City, allowed the center to place more attention on preventive measures rather than curative programs, resulting to decreased health care costs and increase in company productivity. Despite the change, the center still focuses on medical services that include outpatient services and the promotion of healthy living among employees. The goals of the center also include the promotion of lifestyle changes, efficient health maintenance, and the provision of an integrated and holistic approach to total health care and promotion, which also covers nutrition, medical, physical, spiritual and social, and psychological and emotional aspects of employee wellness.

== Facilities ==
Its support facilities include diagnostic instruments, X-ray equipment, a clinical laboratory, a fitness center. In addition to this, the company itself operates 42 canteens throughout its franchise area. The current set-up as a corporate wellness center provides well-rounded healthcare program for Meralco’s staff which includes programs for occupational health disease prevention and control, wellness promotion and education. Its services are compartmentalized into three major areas: basic corporate health, corporate wellness, and corporate social responsibility.

== Facilitators ==
A core care team was formed and currently leads and coordinates the delivery of integrated wellness programs to employees. The physician who is currently in charge of the overall management and administration of the John F. Cotton center, including the provision of medical care, is Dr. Efren R. Vicaldo, who is also the head the Congenital Heart Disease section of the Philippine Heart Center and the Cardiology section of the FEU NRMF Medical Center. The medical director is Dr. Angelito P. Obillo, and another administrator is Dr. Rafael B. Agra.

== See also ==
- Meralco
- List of hospitals in the Philippines
- AVICENNA Directory for medicine
