= Meralco =

Largest electric power distribution company in the Philippines

Manila Electric Company
- Logo

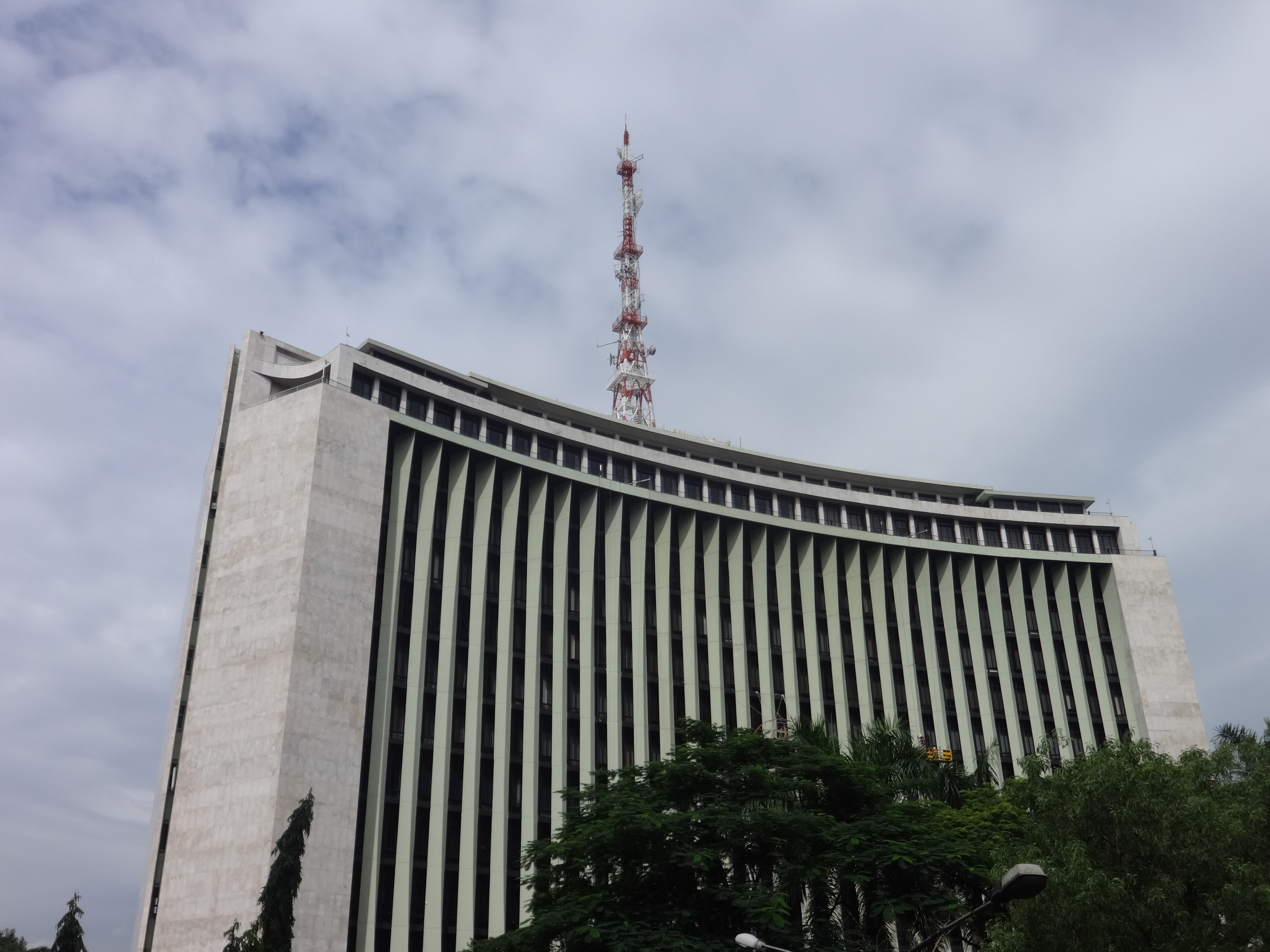
- Meralco Building at the Meralco Compound in Pasig
- Formerly: Manila Electric Railroad and Light Company (1903–1919)
- Type: Publicly-listed affiliate For-profit stock corporation
- Traded as: PSE: MER
- Industry: Power distributor & generation (thru subsidiaries)
- Predecessor: Compañía Electricista de Manila; Compañía de Tranvías y Ferrocarriles de Filipinas
- Founded: March 24, 1903; 123 years ago SEC Registration No.: PW-102
- Founder: Charles M. Swift
- Headquarters: Meralco Building, Ortigas Avenue, Pasig, Philippines
- Key people: Manny Pangilinan, Chairman and CEO
- Owner: see list
- Subsidiaries: see list
- Website: www.meralco.com.ph

The Manila Electric Company, commonly referred to as Meralco (/məˈrɑːlkoʊ/, Tagalog: [mɛˈɾalkɔ], stylized in all caps), is the largest electric power distribution company in the Philippines. It is the sole electric power distributor in Metro Manila and holds the power distribution franchise for 39 cities and 72 municipalities, including all of Metro Manila and the exurbs that form Mega Manila.

The name "Meralco" is an acronym for Manila Electric Railroad and Light Company, the company's official name until 1919.

== History ==
=== La Electricista ===
Organized in 1891 and beginning operations in late 1900, La Electricista was the first electric company to provide electricity to Manila towards the close of the Spanish era. La Electricista had built a central power plant on Calle San Sebastián (now Hidalgo Street) in Quiapo, Manila. On January 17, 1895, its streetlights were turned on for the first time and by 1903, it had about 3,000 electric light customers.

=== Founding of the Manila "Electricity", "Railroad" and "Lighting" Company (MERaLCo) ===
On October 20, 1902, under the American Insular Government, the Second Philippine Commission began accepting bids to operate Manila's electric company, and by extension, providing public lighting to the city and its suburbs. Detroit entrepreneur Charles M. Swift was the sole bidder and on March 24, 1903, was granted the original basic franchise of the Manila Electric Company. March 24 thus is marked annually as the company's anniversary.

The Manila Electric Company acquired both La Electricista and the Compañía de los Tranvías de Filipinas, a firm that ran Manila's horse-drawn tramways which was founded in 1882. Construction on the railed tramway began that same year. In addition to acquiring La Electricista's Calle San Sebastián power plant, the company built its own turbine rotated by water steam generating electricity plant on Isla de Provisor (later becoming the Manila Thermal Power Plant), which fuelled the railed tram system and eventually also provided the electric service. By 1906, the Manila Suburb Railway was founded and later merged with the Manila Electric Company. Forming the Manila Electric, Railway and Lighting Company. The name Manila Electricity, Lighting and Railroad Company (MELARCo) was also considered.

=== Manila Suburban Railways Company ===
Swift was awarded another franchise in 1906 to operate a 9.8 kilometres (6.1 mi) extension line from Paco to Fort McKinley and Pasig and founded the Manila Suburban Railway to operate this franchise. In 1919 this company merged with the Manila Electric Company. This extension was one of the most profitable of MERALCO's lines.

By the 1920, MERALCO had invested in transportation and owned a 170-strong fleet of streetcars, before switching over to buses later in that decade.

The company operated 52-miles of trams until World War II. The equipment and tracks of the system were severely damaged during the war and had to be removed.

=== Power generation and distribution ===
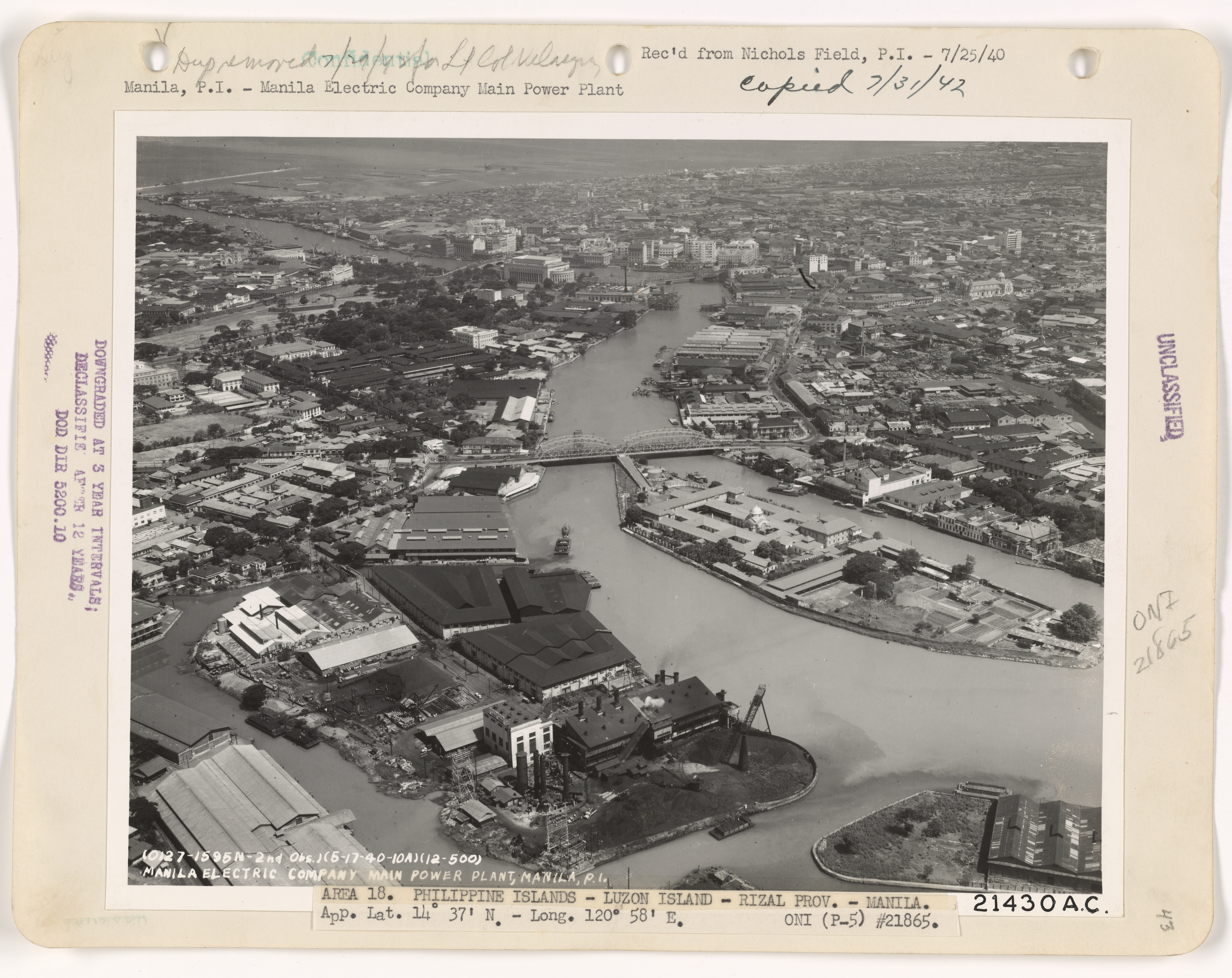
Aerial view of Manila Electric Company Main Power Plant (foreground), 1940

By 1915, electricity generation and distribution became the main MERALCO's main income generator, overtaking its public transportation operations in terms of revenue. In 1919, it changed its official name to Manila Electric Company. The following year, the company was boosted by the eventual commencement of operations of an upgraded power plant located in Isla del Provisor, an island in the Pasig River. Initially, the coal being used in the said power plant was mined and imported from Japan. The power plant consists of twelve 400 HP Babcock and Wilcox water tubes and is also equipped with a mechanical stocker to adjust output and draught fans. The generated electricity could power the homes of at least 300,000 people in Manila, though it was limited to those living within a 5-mile radius of the power plant.

Due to the existing power generation capabilities of the company, the company's power capacity had grown to 45 million kWh during the early part of the 1920s.

In 1925, MERALCO was acquired by the utility holding company Associated Gas and Electric, which had begun a massive expansion throughout the United States and Canada. With AGECO's financial backing, MERALCO began acquiring several existing utility companies in the Philippines, enabling the company to expand beyond Manila.

By 1930, MERALCO had completed construction of the Philippine's first hydroelectric power plant, the 23MW Botocan Hydro Station. At the time, this plant was one of the largest engineering projects in Asia and constituted the largest single private capital investment in the Philippines. The additional capacity allowed the company to begin hooking up customers throughout the metropolitan area.

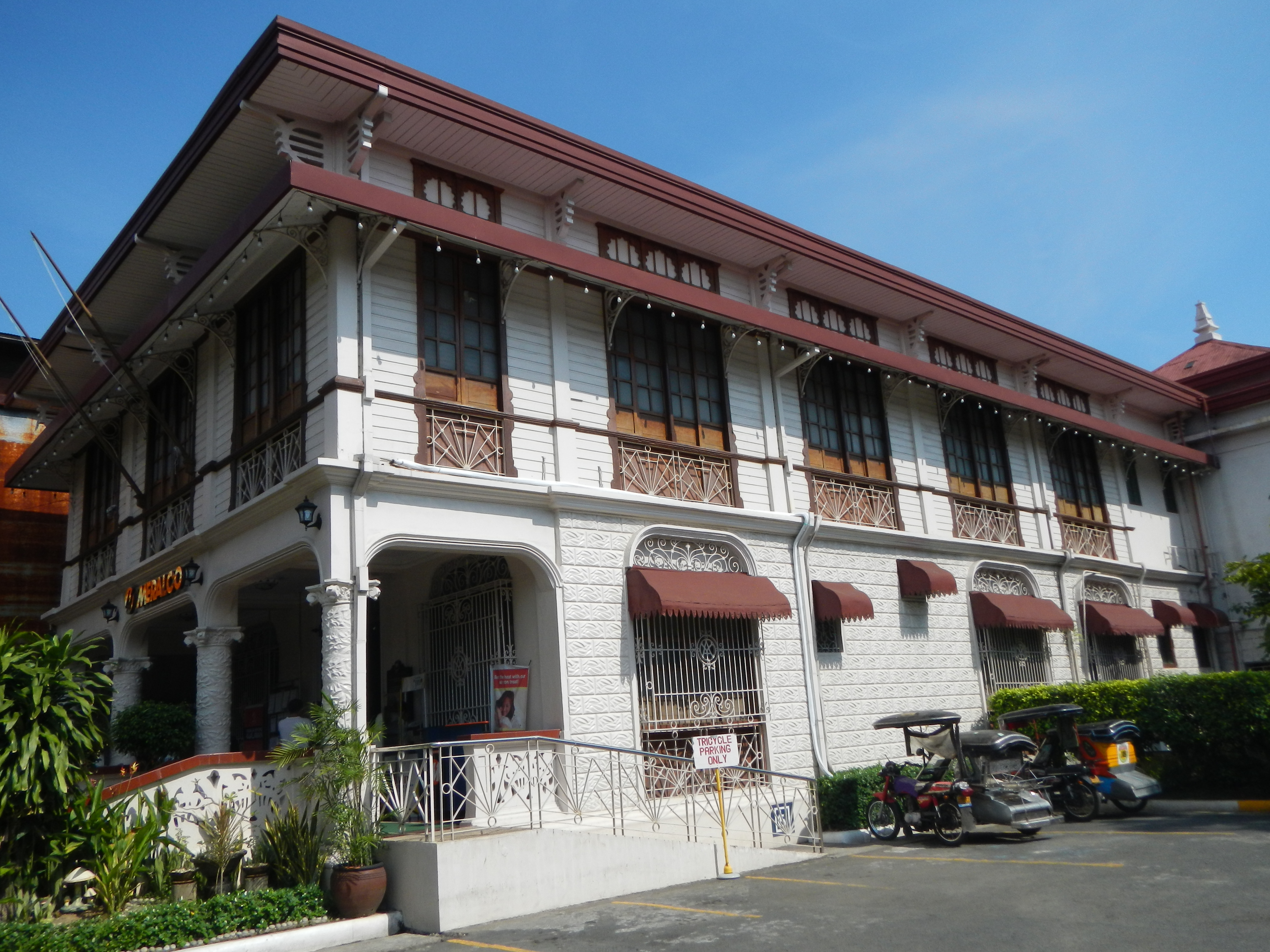
Meralco office (Malolos City Cultural and Heritage House)

To drive demand for more power, MERALCO also opened a retail store in order to sell electric home appliances.

=== World War II ===
During the Second World War, the Japanese occupying forces forcibly transferred all of MERALCO's assets and holdings to the Japanese-controlled Taiwan Power Company.

=== Postwar ===
By the war's end, most of the former Meralco facilities had been destroyed. AGECO was reorganized as General Public Utilities Corporation or GPU in 1946. MERALCO's autobus franchise was sold to Halili Transport.

=== Acquisition by the López group ===
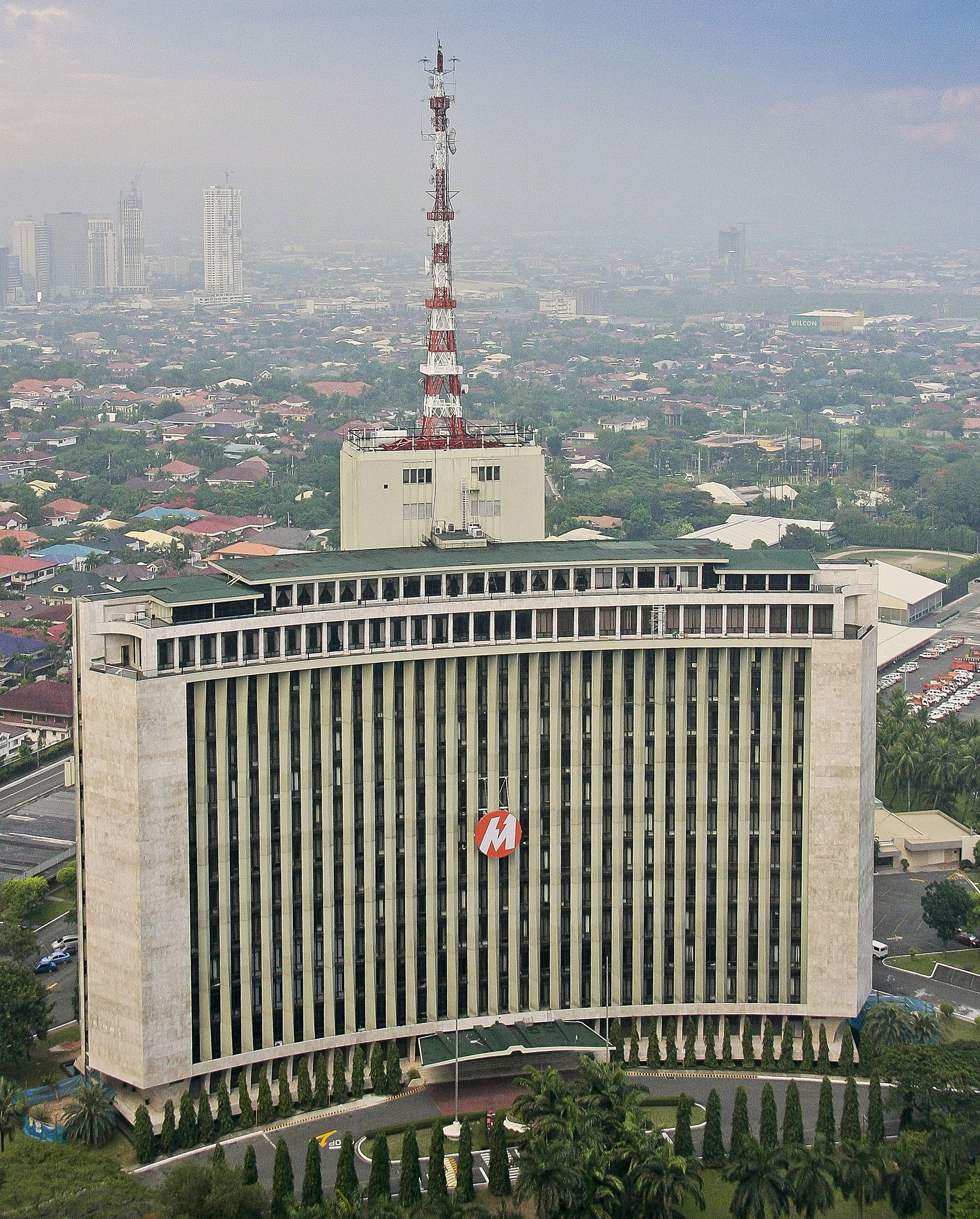
Meralco (López) Building along Ortigas Avenue, Pasig, Metro Manila.

In 1962, Eugenio López, Sr. of the influential López family of Iloilo put together Meralco Securities Corporation (MSC), which acquired MERALCO, making it wholly Filipino-owned. During 1962-72, he increased MERALCO's power generating capacity by five times with the building of additional power stations in the Manila area with two more planned in Rizal Province.

The Meralco Building, designed by National Artist of the Philippines for Architecture José María Zaragoza, was built during this period. The Meralco Theater within it was inaugurated shortly thereafter, in March 1969.

=== Martial law and Romualdez takeover ===
In September 1972, President Ferdinand Marcos, who had begun feuding with the Lópezes, declared Martial Law, acquiring and consolidating power and effectively extending his powers beyond the constitutional term limit which would have forced him to step down in 1973. A few weeks later in November 1972, he issued Presidential Decree № 40, which nationalized the country's electric generation and transmission. A few more weeks after that, Marcos had López' son and namesake, Eugenio "Geny" López, Jr. arrested without formal charges, claiming that the younger López had been involved in an alleged assassination attempt against him.

Geny's arrest became a bargaining chip which eventually compelled the Lopezes to sell their controlling share of Meralco Securities Corporation to Marcos' associates late in 1973. Ownership of Meralco Securities Corporation was placed under a newly created shell company called the Meralco Foundation, Inc., controlled by Marcos' brother-in-law Benjamin Romuáldez, which made a down payment of about $1,500 for a "very minimal" total sale price of about $28 million (200 million pesos at the prevailing rate). Installment payments were supposed to be due starting two years later.

The Meralco Foundation takeover was immediately followed by a 100% increase in electric rates, with continuous increases throughout Romuáldez's management. A rate adjustment clause, which allowed MERALCO to adjust its rates depending on crude oil increases or higher dollar exchange rates, was also introduced.

In 1977, MSC was renamed First Philippine Holdings Corporation.

By 1978, all of the Philippines' major power plants were owned and operated by Napocor, including the Metro Manila plants that MERALCO had built beforehand in the 1960s. By the end of the Martial Law period in 1981, MERALCO expanded even further into Cavite and western parts of Laguna, Rizal and Quezon provinces, as well as parts of southern Bulacan.

Meralco Foundation's control of MERALCO lasted until the People Power Revolution in February 1986 when it defaulted on its payments under the terms of the original turnover of shares in 1973, although it took a five-year period before the shares were eventually reverted to the Lópezes in 1991.

=== After martial law ===
President Corazon Aquino reverted company ownership to the López Group. She also enacted an executive order that allowed the company to directly compete with Napocor.

On March 18, 1989, MERALCO unveiled its new and current corporate logo.

In 1990, MERALCO acquired the electric facilities and other assets of the Communications and Electric Development Authority, one of two companies that distributed power in Cavite Province for much of the 1970s and 1980s.

=== Entry of First Pacific and JG Summit groups ===
Between 2009 and 2012, the López Group would reduce its 33.4% holdings in MERALCO by selling most of its shares to the First Pacific Group. By 2012, the López Group's holdings in MERALCO would be reduced to 3.95%.

The First Pacific Group, through Metro Pacific Investments Corporation (MPIC), currently holds the majority share in MERALCO, followed by the Gokongwei Family's JG Summit Group. (See further: ownership )

=== Early renewal initiatives during the 16th Congress ===
In 2014 and 2015, MERALCO requested the 16th Congress to tackle the extension of its franchise early, although its renewal was not due until six years later, in 2020.

=== Franchise renewal ===
On April 11, 2025, President Bongbong Marcos signed Republic Act No. 12146 which renewed MERALCO's franchise for another 25 years from its expiration in 2028.

== Controversies ==
=== 2008 legislative investigation on high power rates ===
Meralco is facing a Philippine legislative inquiry/investigation for alleged excessive pricing. The government has considered a plan to take over Meralco, to reduce electricity bills. Meralco and National Transmission Corporation (TransCo) blamed each other for the high power rates. Meralco also blames high power generation costs, high transmission costs and government taxes imposed on the electricity sector from power generation to distribution. Government Service Insurance System (GSIS) President Winston García, however, blamed Meralco's inefficiency, its "bloated bureaucracy" and its sourcing of power from independent power producers (IPPs) also owned by the López Family, and the need to amend the Electric Power Industry Reform Act (EPIRA) of 2001. Oscar López said that if the GSIS would buy the Meralco shares, they must buy in whole cash, while many businessmen also said that taking over Meralco is not the way to reduce electricity prices, which depends on the national government and the President. The issue was also seen as a purposeful diversion from the then-ongoing ZTE NBN scandal and other government issues. A perceived lack of general understanding regarding the issue of system loss, inherent in the business of utilities prompted Meralco's former holding company, First Philippine Holdings, to issue advertisements explaining systems loss. The latter had featured Judy Ann Santos prominently to the extent she received bashing/online hate and calls for the general public to boycott her - not watch any shows or movies she was or would be starring in, as well as patronize products she was an endorser for.

=== Syndicated estafa and bribery case ===
The Department of Justice (Philippines) filed syndicated (fraud) charges against Meralco in its August 22, 2008 31-page resolution, filed with the Pasig Regional Trial Court. The May 29 National Association of Electricity Consumers for Reform (Nasecore) complaint accused Meralco of "illegally declaring as income ₱889 million in consumers' money, which represents interest from meter and bill deposits consumers had been paying since 1995." No bail was recommended for all the accused, 2006 officers of Meralco, to wit: Meralco chairman and CEO Manuel Lopez, executive vice president and chief financial officer Daniel Tagaza, first Vice-resident and treasurer Rafael Andrada, vice president and corporate auditor and compliance officer Helen De Guzman, vice president and assistant comptroller Antonio Valera, and senior assistant vice president and assistant treasurer Manolo Fernando; 2006 Meralco directors Arthur Defensor Jr., Gregory Domingo, Octavio Victor Espiritu, Christian Monsod, Federico Puno, Washington Sycip, Emilio Vicens, Francisco Viray and former Prime Minister Cesar Virata.

Nasecore's complaint accusing Meralco of "illegally declaring as income 889 million pesos in consumers' money, which represents interest from meter and bill deposits consumers had been paying since 1995," was immediately refuted by the accused company as the alleged ₱889 million only stemmed from a generally accepted accounting principle of reversing Meralco's earlier provision for meter deposit interests which, earlier set at 10% per annum was deemed too high and was set to the recommended 6%. Meralco also questioned how a syndicated estafa case can arise when it has already announced and committed that it will be refunding to customers who paid meter deposit principals plus interest months ahead of the ERC prescribed schedule and has allocated enough funds for the said refund.

Meralco is also involved in the GSIS-Meralco bribery case.

=== Dismissal of syndicated estafa case ===
On October 6, 2008, the Pasig Regional Trial Court Branch 71 dismissed the syndicated estafa case filed against the Meralco board of directors, for the prosecution failed to establish all the elements of syndicated estafa.

Presiding Judge Franco Falcon, pointed out in the ruling that the board is not the kind described by the law as being formed to perpetrate an illegal act for the board of directors were elected by stockholders. The court explained, "Therefore, the accused can never be charged of taking part in the commission of syndicated estafa not only because they are not part of a syndicate as contemplated by law in PD 1689, but more so, because there was absolutely no estafa committed."

According to Philippine law, to constitute syndicated estafa, the subject money or property must be received by the offenders. The money represents the accrued interests on the bill and meter deposits, which were paid by Meralco customers, not directly to the board, but to the various Meralco business centers where the customers transacted. Meralco expressed elation over the dismissal.

=== Judiciary's decision on 1999 disconnection incident ===
A complaint was filed by Lucy Yu against Meralco which, on December 9, 1999, its representatives, forcibly entering her office at the New Supersonic Industrial Corp. in Valenzuela, shut off the electricity in the factory and Yu's residence.

The Court of Appeals later ruled that Meralco violated the law when it cut off the electric supply of a consumer without notice; the decision was later upheld by the Supreme Court in late June 2023, with Yu being entitled to ₱150,000 in damages. The court said that a written notice must be given to the consumer at least 48 hours prior to Meralco's disconnection of its electric service on grounds cited under Section 4(a) of Republic Act No. 7832; in that case, a consumer's right to due process was violated.

Spokesperson Joe Zaldarriaga, in a statement, said that Meralco will respect and abide by the said decision; however, he said that the incident occurred when Meralco was already implementing a policy of serving prior disconnection notices.

=== Allocation of the 2.4 GHz ISM band ===
The 2.4 GHz band is mostly used by Wi-Fi and Bluetooth. In 1993, the National Telecommunications Commission allocated the 2.4 GHz band for the exclusive use by Meralco in Metro Manila, Central Luzon, and Calabarzon for the operation of their Supervisory Control and Data Access (SCADA) system which controls and monitors Meralco’s substations. This has made the use of the 2.4 GHz band in the Philippines illegal, in spite of the International Telecommunication Union declaring the 2.4 GHz band as an ISM unlicensed band.

On September 12, 2003, the NTC issued Memorandum Circular No. 09-09-2003, which lifted the ban on the 2.4 GHz band.

== Service area ==
Meralco's franchise area.

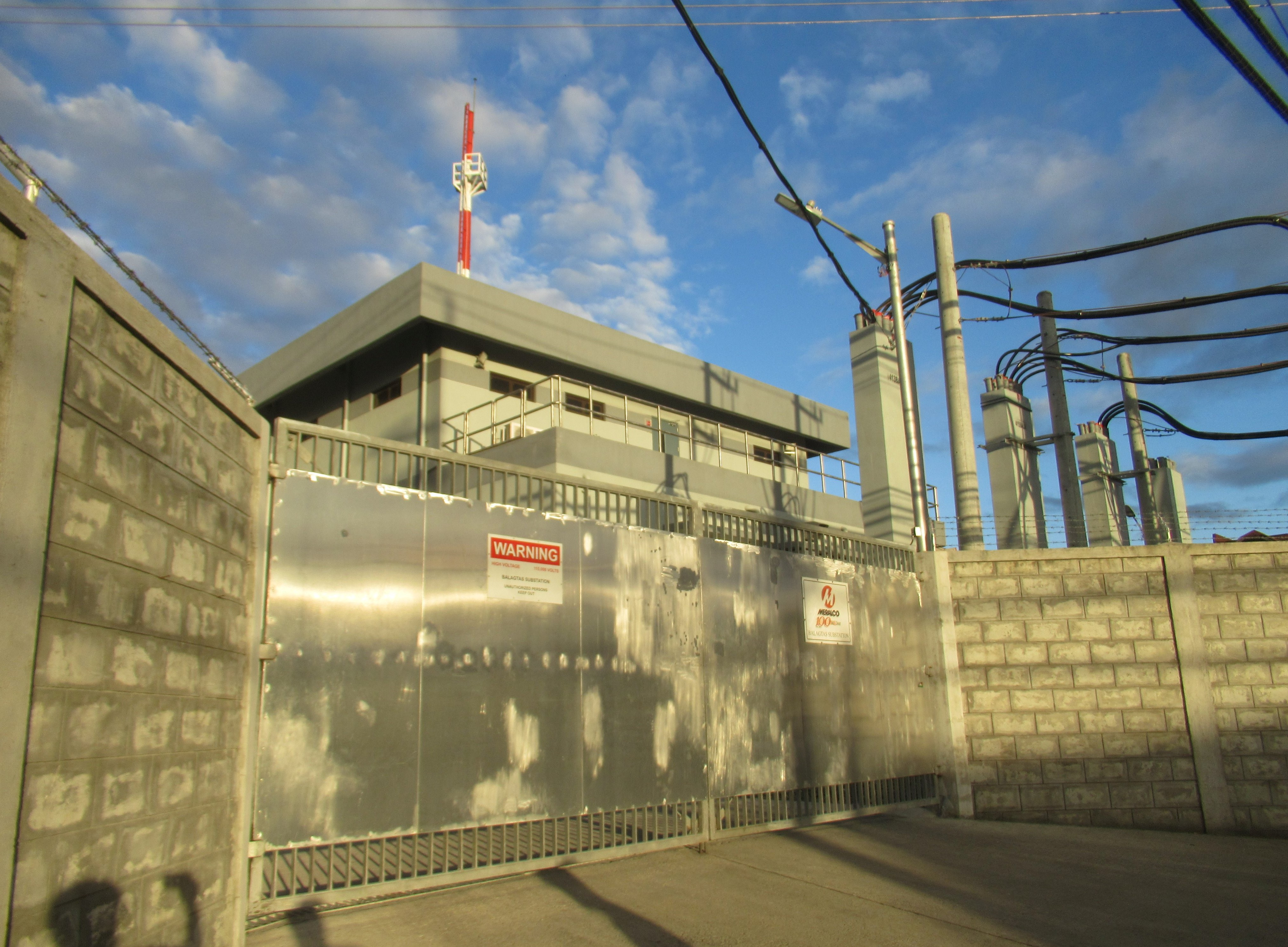
Balagtas 115 kilovolts (kV)-34.5 kV Substation

Meralco serves Metro Manila, where it is the sole electricity distributor, as well as parts of the nearby provinces of Bulacan, Cavite, Laguna, Batangas, Rizal, Quezon, and Pampanga. Bulacan, Cavite, and Rizal are entirely within Meralco's franchise area. In Laguna and Quezon, Meralco serves most areas, while other areas, mostly rural municipalities, are served by electric cooperatives.

In Batangas, Meralco serves Santo Tomas, the First Philippine Industrial Park and First Industrial Township Special Economic Zone in Tanauan, Batangas City, San Pascual, and parts of Laurel, Calaca, and Nasugbu, including Barangays Niyugan and Dayap Itaas in Laurel, parts of Barangay Cahil in Calaca, and Barangay Kaylaway in Nasugbu, while the rest of the province is served by electric cooperatives. In Pampanga, the company serves some barangays in Candaba.

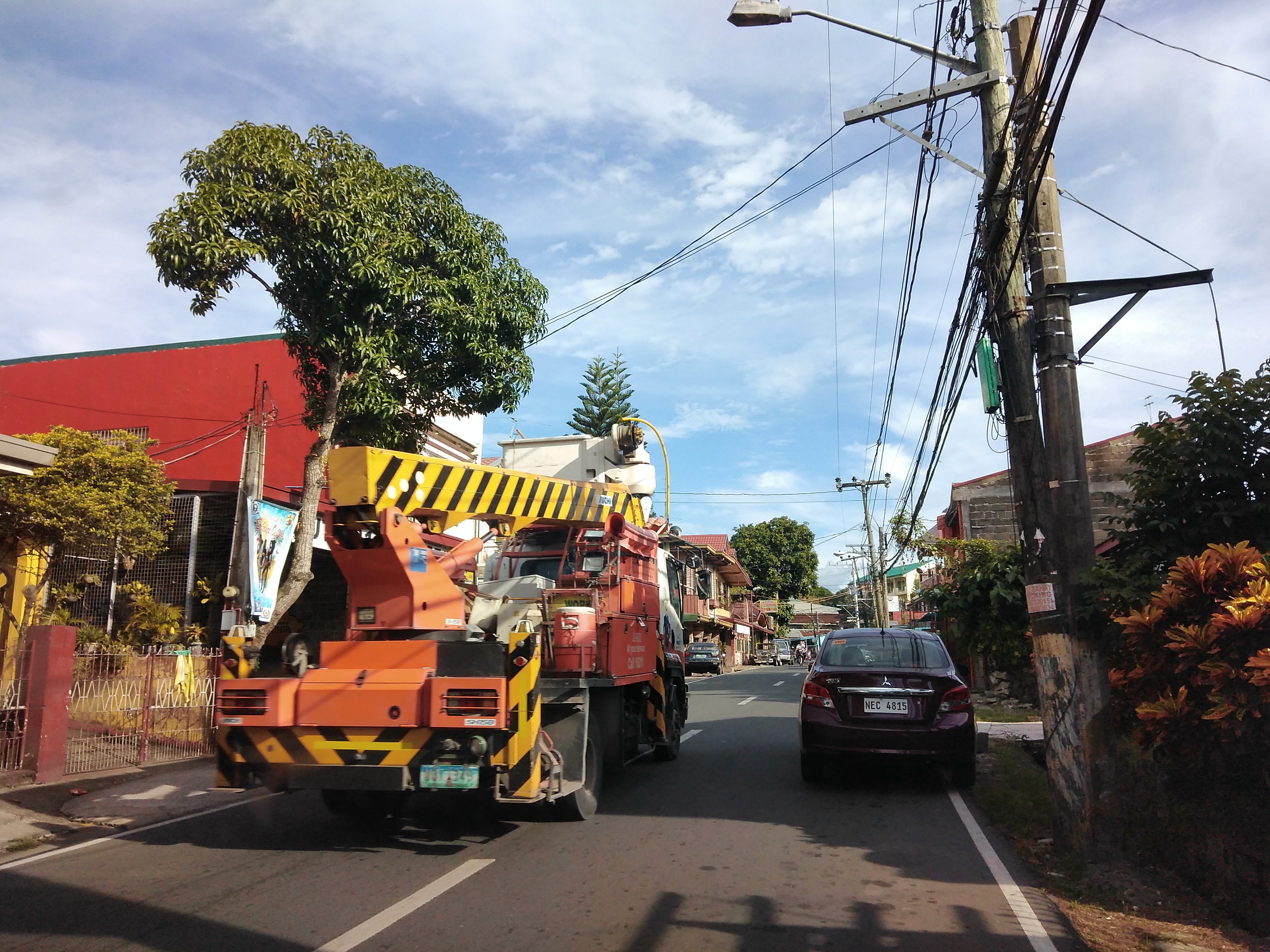
A Meralco service truck

City/Municipality	Province/Metropolitan Area
Caloocan	Metro Manila
Las Piñas	Metro Manila
Makati	Metro Manila
Malabon	Metro Manila
Mandaluyong	Metro Manila
Manila	Metro Manila
Marikina	Metro Manila
Muntinlupa	Metro Manila
Navotas	Metro Manila
Parañaque	Metro Manila
Pasay	Metro Manila
Pasig	Metro Manila
Pateros	Metro Manila
Quezon City	Metro Manila
San Juan	Metro Manila
Taguig	Metro Manila
Valenzuela	Metro Manila
Angat	Bulacan
Balagtas	Bulacan
Baliuag	Bulacan
Bocaue	Bulacan
Bulacan	Bulacan
Bustos	Bulacan
Calumpit	Bulacan
Doña Remedios Trinidad	Bulacan
Guiguinto	Bulacan
Hagonoy	Bulacan
Malolos	Bulacan
Marilao	Bulacan
Meycauayan	Bulacan
Norzagaray	Bulacan
Obando	Bulacan
Pandi	Bulacan
Paombong	Bulacan
Plaridel	Bulacan
Pulilan	Bulacan
San Ildefonso	Bulacan
San Jose Del Monte	Bulacan
San Miguel	Bulacan
San Rafael	Bulacan
Santa Maria	Bulacan
Candaba	Pampanga
Batangas	Batangas
San Pascual	Batangas
Santo Tomas	Batangas
Alfonso	Cavite
Amadeo	Cavite
Bacoor	Cavite
Carmona	Cavite
Cavite	Cavite
Dasmariñas	Cavite
General Emilio Aguinaldo	Cavite
General Mariano Alvarez	Cavite
General Trias	Cavite
Imus	Cavite
Indang	Cavite
Kawit	Cavite
Magallanes	Cavite
Maragondon	Cavite
Mendez	Cavite
Naic	Cavite
Noveleta	Cavite
Rosario	Cavite
Silang	Cavite
Tagaytay	Cavite
Tanza	Cavite
Ternate	Cavite
Trece Martires	Cavite
Alaminos	Laguna
Bay	Laguna
Biñan	Laguna
Cabuyao	Laguna
Calamba	Laguna
Calauan	Laguna
Liliw	Laguna
Los Baños	Laguna
Luisiana	Laguna
Magdalena	Laguna
Majayjay	Laguna
Nagcarlan	Laguna
Pila	Laguna
Rizal	Laguna
San Pablo	Laguna
San Pedro	Laguna
Santa Cruz	Laguna
Santa Rosa	Laguna
Victoria	Laguna
Candelaria	Quezon
Dolores	Quezon
Lucban	Quezon
Lucena	Quezon
Mauban	Quezon
Pagbilao	Quezon
Sampaloc	Quezon
San Antonio	Quezon
Sariaya	Quezon
Tayabas	Quezon
Tiaong	Quezon
Angono	Rizal
Antipolo	Rizal
Baras	Rizal
Binangonan	Rizal
Cainta	Rizal
Cardona	Rizal
Jalajala	Rizal
Morong	Rizal
Pililla	Rizal
Rodriguez	Rizal
San Mateo	Rizal
Tanay	Rizal
Taytay	Rizal
Teresa	Rizal

== Ownership ==
MERALCO is 48% owned by First Pacific-owned &/or linked, and Manny Pangilinan-led entities. Its public ownership level is at 26.09%% with the following breakdown as of June 30, 2025, and as amended on July 23, 2025 regarding transfer of shares in escrow from Landbank of the Philippines to a San Miguel Corporation subsidiary:

Major Shareholder	% of Total*	Common Shares	Preferred* Shares
Beacon Electric Asset Holdings, Inc.	34.96%	394,059,235	—
JG Summit Holdings, Inc.	26.37%	297,189,397	—
Metro Pacific Investments Corp.	12.50%	140,906,807	—
PCD NOMINEE CORPORATION (FILIPINO)**	9.2%	103,696,498	—
PCD NOMINEE CORPORATION (NON−FILIPINO)**	6.00%	66,414,005	—
First Philippine Holdings Corporation	4.0%	44,382,436	—
San Miguel Global Power Holdings ( a unit of San Miguel Corporation)	3.8355%	43,229,796	—
Others^	3.1345%	37,214,335	—
Total Authorized	—	1,250,000,000	3,000,000,000
Total Outstanding	100%	1,127,092,509	(undisclosed)

* In Gamboa v. Finance Secretary Teves (G.R. No. 176579 | June 28, 2011): The Supreme Court of the Philippines ruled that under Section 11, Article XII of the Constitution, “capital” in a public utility refers only to shares entitled to vote in the election of directors. Thus, Preferred shares that have been vested with such power are included in the relevant computations, in addition to common shares that naturally are appurtenant with voting privileges in every aspect.
** While the Philippine Central Depository (PCD) is listed a major shareholder, it is more of a trustee-nominee for all shares lodged in the PCD system rather than a single owner/shareholder. Major beneficial shareholders (i.e. those who own at least 5% of outstanding capital stock with voting rights) hidden, if any, under the PCD system are checked/identified and are disclosed with the Definitive Information Statement companies are submitting annually to the local bourse and Securities and Exchange Commission

== Subsidiaries ==
- Clark Electric Distribution Corporation (65%)
- Shin Clark Power Holdings, Inc. (60%)
- Meralco PowerGen Corporation (MGEN)
  - San Buenaventura Philippines Ltd. Company (owns the majority stake at 51%)
  - PacificLight Power Pte Ltd. (58%) - a company who operates LNG-fueled combined cycle turbine power plants on Jurong Island, Singapore
- MGEN Thermal Energy, Inc.
  - Alsons Thermal Energy Corporation (50% stake)
- SP New Energy Corporation
- PH Renewables Inc. (PHRI) -

== Sports teams ==
- Meralco Reddy Kilowatts (MICAA basketball team)
- Meralco Bolts (PBA team)
- FC Meralco Manila (Philippines Football League team)
- Meralco Power Spikers (Shakey's V-League and Philippine Super Liga team)

== See also ==
- John F. Cotton Corporate Wellness Center
- List of electric distribution utilities in the Philippines
