= MFI Foundation =

Private organization and school in Pasig, Philippines

MFI Polytechnic Institute Inc.

- Location in Metro Manila Location in Luzon Location in the Philippines
- Formation: November 6, 1973
- Type: Non-stock, non-profit science foundation
- Legal status: Foundation
- Purpose: Technical-vocational education scholarship and training; agri-business education and training
- Headquarters: MFI Bldg.
- Location: Ortigas Avenue, 1605, Pasig, Philippines
- Coordinates: 14°35′23″N 121°04′14″E
- Website: www.mfi.org.ph

MFI Foundation Inc. (formerly Meralco Foundation, Inc.) is a non-stock, non-profit science foundation based in Pasig, Metro Manila, Philippines.

The MFI Farm Business Institute at Jalajala is located at the MFI Technological Institute at Ortigas Campus, the MFI Technological Institute at Pasay Taft Campus, and the MFI Technological Institute at Ortigas Campus of MFI.

== Centers of Operation ==
=== MFI Technological Institute ===
Founded in 1983, the MFI Technological Institute (formerly Meralco Foundation Institute) was created to address the industry's need for middle-level technical expertise. The institute offers three primary programs: the Industrial Technician Program (ITP) designed for youth, the Dual Training System (DTS), and the Technical Training and Testing Program, now known as MFI Training, catering to skilled workers, engineers, and other professionals.

Initially, the ITP exclusively offered full scholarships; however, in recent years, the program has broadened its scope to include fee-paying students as well.

As a partner institution of the Technical Education and Skills Development Authority (TESDA), MFI-TI has conducted teacher-training programs for Saudi nationals. As a Model Center of Excellence in the Philippines, the institute has conducted training programs for ASEAN teachers through the sponsorship of the Association for Overseas Technical Scholarship (AOTS).

=== MFI Farm Business Institute ===
As part of the MFI Farm Business Institute (MFI-FBI), I'm excited to share that the institute was founded in 2008. Its primary aim is to empower farmers, enabling them to transition into agribusiness entrepreneurs and fostering rural area growth. The Bachelor of Science in Entrepreneurial Management (BSEM) with a focus on Farm Business was introduced at MFI-FBI in 2009, established through a collaboration between the University of Rizal System (URS) and the Management Association of the Philippines (MAP).

== Tribong MFI ==
Tribong MFI, a tripartite initiative, commenced its events in 2000 with the backing of local government units (LGUs) and volunteer doctors and dentists from both private and public sectors. The organization conducts regular medical missions in Metro Manila and nearby provinces as part of its program.
