= Primearth EV Energy =

Japanese prismatic nickel–metal hydride and lithium-ion battery pack manufacturer

Primearth EV Energy Co., Ltd. (abbreviated as PEVE) is a Japanese manufacturer of prismatic nickel–metal hydride (NiMH) and lithium-ion battery packs for hybrid electric vehicles, located in Shizuoka Prefecture, Japan. PEVE's products had been solely based on NiMH until early 2011 when the company has started mass production of Li-ion battery.

== History ==
The company, originally called Panasonic EV Energy Co. until 2 June 2010, was founded in 1996 as a joint venture between Toyota and Panasonic, with Panasonic holding 60% of the capital. Panasonic sold 40.5% of the company to Toyota as a condition of purchasing Sanyo. Panasonic decided to reduce its stake in PEVE to speed up the process of getting approvals from antitrust authorities in China and the U.S. The planned purchase of Sanyo would hand Panasonic a market share of around 80% in nickel hydride batteries.

PEVE has supplied battery packs for HEVs and PHEVs mainly of Toyota, including the Toyota Prius, but also of Honda and General Motors.

== Development ==
In 2020, Panasonic and Toyota have formed the second EV battery joint venture named Prime Planet Energy & Solutions (PPES) that would focus on the development and manufacturing of Li-ion battery and a solid-state battery.

== See also ==
- Sony Energy Devices Corporation
- Prime Planet Energy & Solutions
