= First Philippine Industrial Park =

Industrial area in Batangas, Philippines

Coordinates: 14°08′11″N 121°07′18″E

First Philippine Industrial Park, established in 1996, comprises 520 hectares (1,300 acres) ecozone located in the cities of Tanauan and Santo Tomas in the province of Batangas, Philippines. Divided into three phases, currently has 67 occupants, including 37 Japanese firms and approximately 30,000 employees on site. Exports in 2011 amounted to US$1.41 billion, according to the company’s latest data. The project is a joint venture between Sumitomo Corporation and First Philippine Holdings Corporation.

== History ==
On February 23, 2013, Sumitomo Corporation, has begun expansion work at the First Philippine Industrial Park in Batangas, to add approximately 100 hectares of property for leasing and allow for additional factories to be constructed upon completion.

In June, 2024, Secretary Alfredo Pascual and Yukihito Honda, Sumitomo’s Diverse Urban Development Group CEO discussed a major expansion of FPIP. In a joint statement, it considers development of additional residential and commercial areas around the hub, including research and development and data centers.

Under the leadership of First Philippine Holdings Corporation and FPH president and COO Francis Giles B. Puno, the premier industrial park is responsible for USD 3.5 billion in export sales per year with over 150 locators providing 70,000 jobs. Collins Aerospace, Murata Manufacturing Philippines, Brother Industries Philippines, Dyson Electronics PTE and First Philec Corporation, among others are currently located in FPIP. Initially, 1,430 new job openings were announced by locators Brother Industries (Philippines), Canon Business Machines (Philippines), Ibiden (Philippines), and Murata Manufacturing (Philippines).

In October 2024, FPIP and Converge ICT agreed to collaborate to serve the industrial hub using FPIP's dark fibre facilities for fiber connectivity to the 150 locators. The contract permits FPIP to adapt to technologies including cloud computing, computer security and digital collaboration.

== Gallery ==
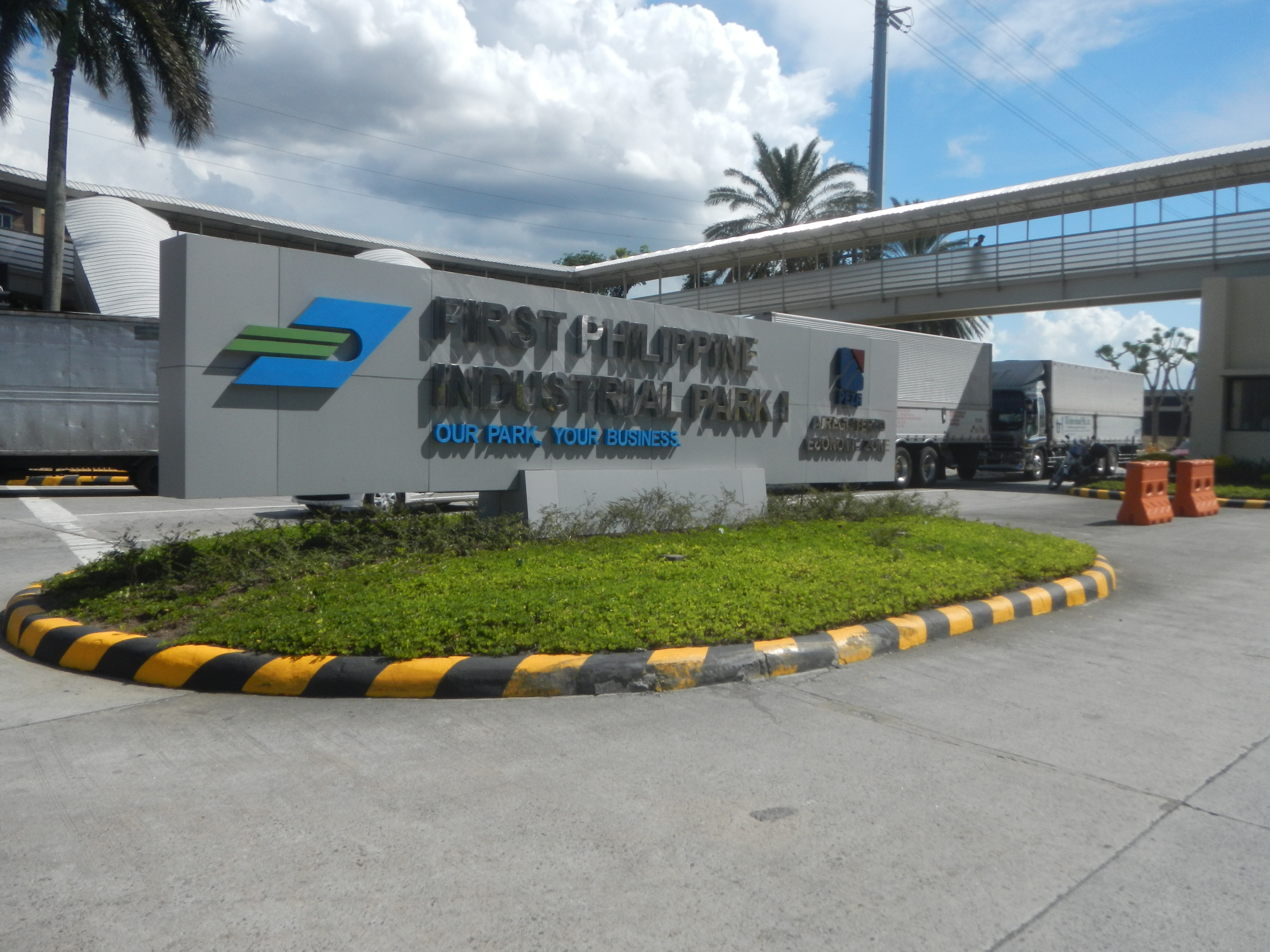
FPIP I

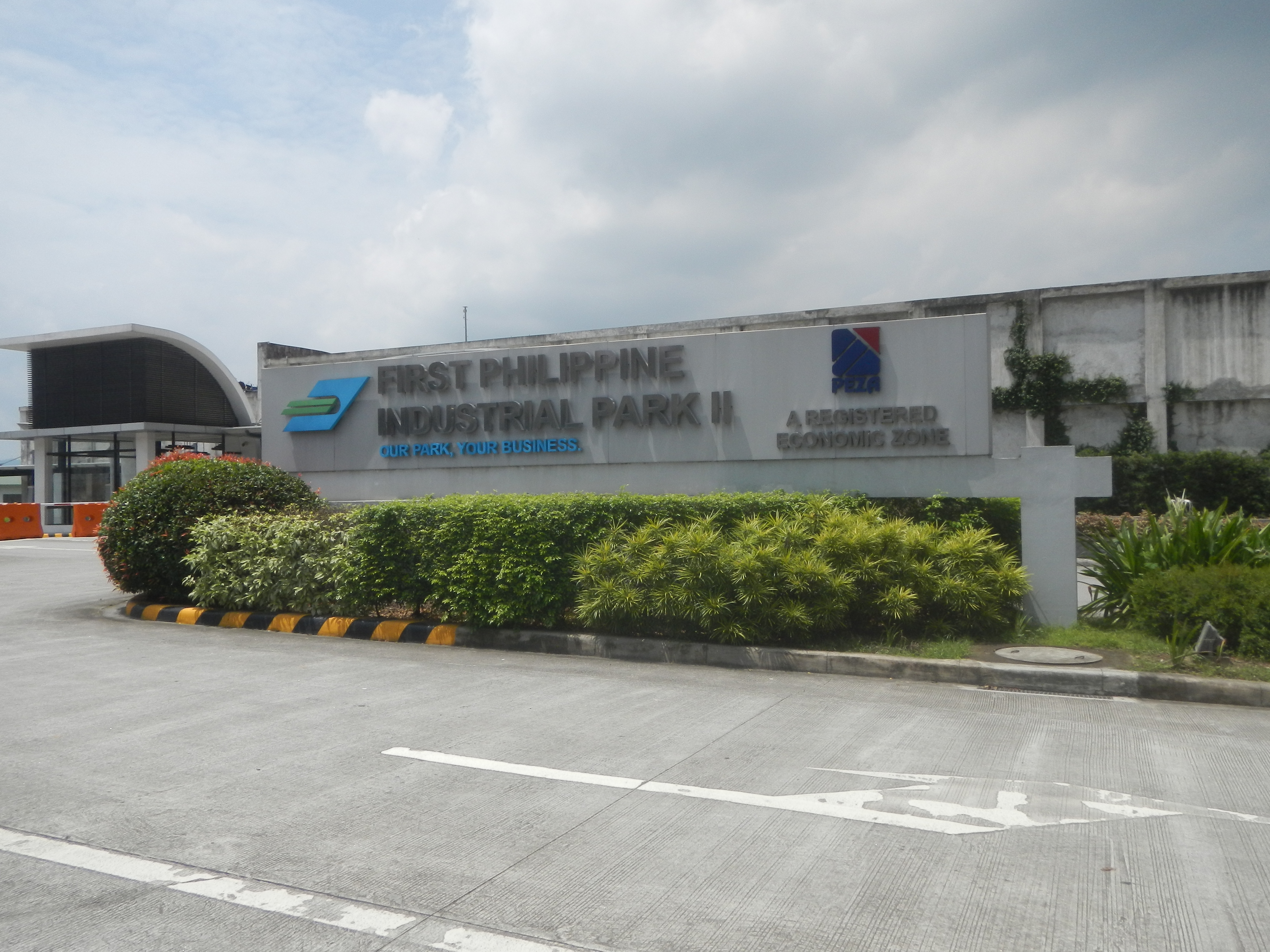
FPIP II

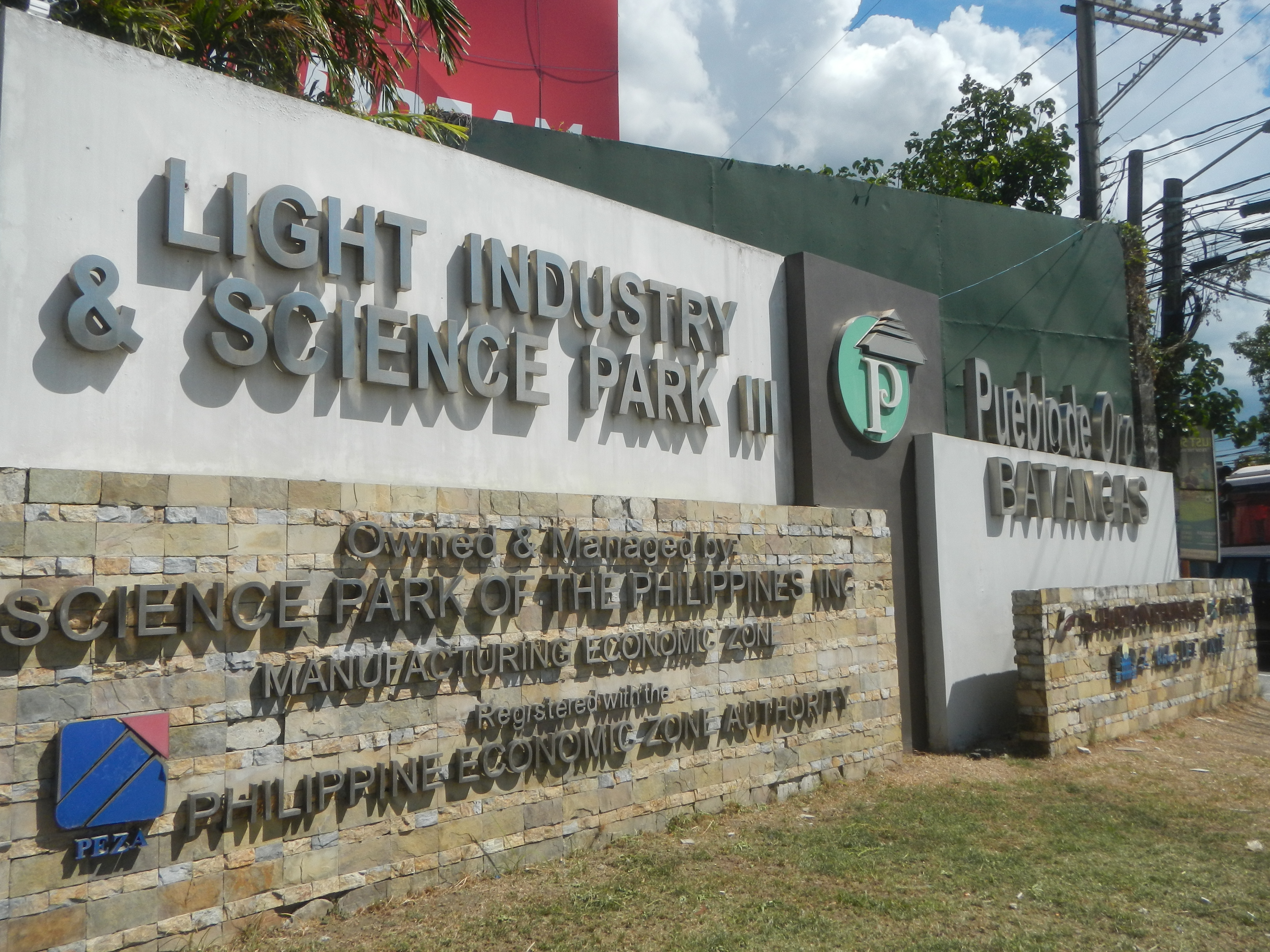
FPIP III
