= Yasutaka Murata =

Yasutaka Murata (村田泰隆 Murata Takashi Yasushi) is a Japanese businessman who was born in 1947 in Kyoto as first son of Akira Murata, who three years earlier founded the company that was to become Murata Manufacturing Co., Ltd.

== Early life ==
Murata graduated from New York University (with a Bachelor of Science degree in Quantitative Analysis).

== Business career ==
Yasutaka Murata first joined Murata Manufacturing in 1973.

In 1974, he was appointed as Director of Murata Electronics Singapore.

He was assigned to be the Senior Executive Director of Fukui Murata Manufacturing in May 1979.

Murata became Executive Vice President of Murata Manufacturing in 1982 and Corporate Executive Vice President seven years later. In June 1991 he became President Statutory Representative Director of Murata Manufacturing.

Since June 2007 Mr. Yasutaka Murata has been serving as Chairman of the Board and Representative Director of Murata Manufacturing Co., Ltd. He is also Chairman of the Board and Representative Director of six subsidiaries.
