= 康隆 =

康隆, meaning 'healthy, noble', may refer to:

- Kang Lung, a Chinese given name for Taiwanese physicist and electrical engineer Kang L. Wang (born 1941)
- Yasutaka, a masculine Japanese given name
