= Murata Electronics (Finland) =

Murata Electronics Oy
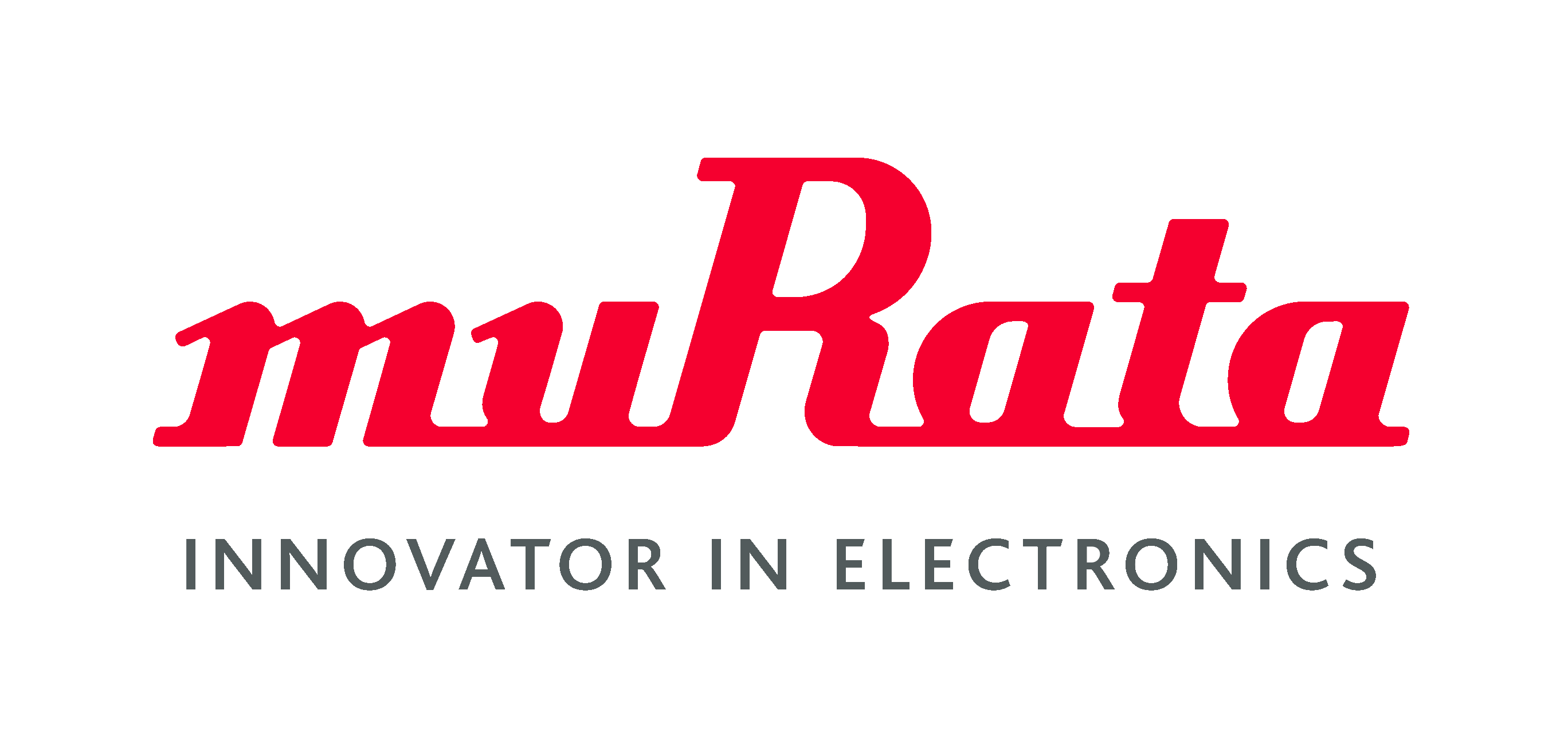
- Company type: Subsidiary of Murata Manufacturing
- Industry: MEMS
- Founded: Vantaa, Finland (1991)
- Headquarters: Vantaa, Finland
- Number of employees: 1000 (2018)
- Website: www.muratafinland.com

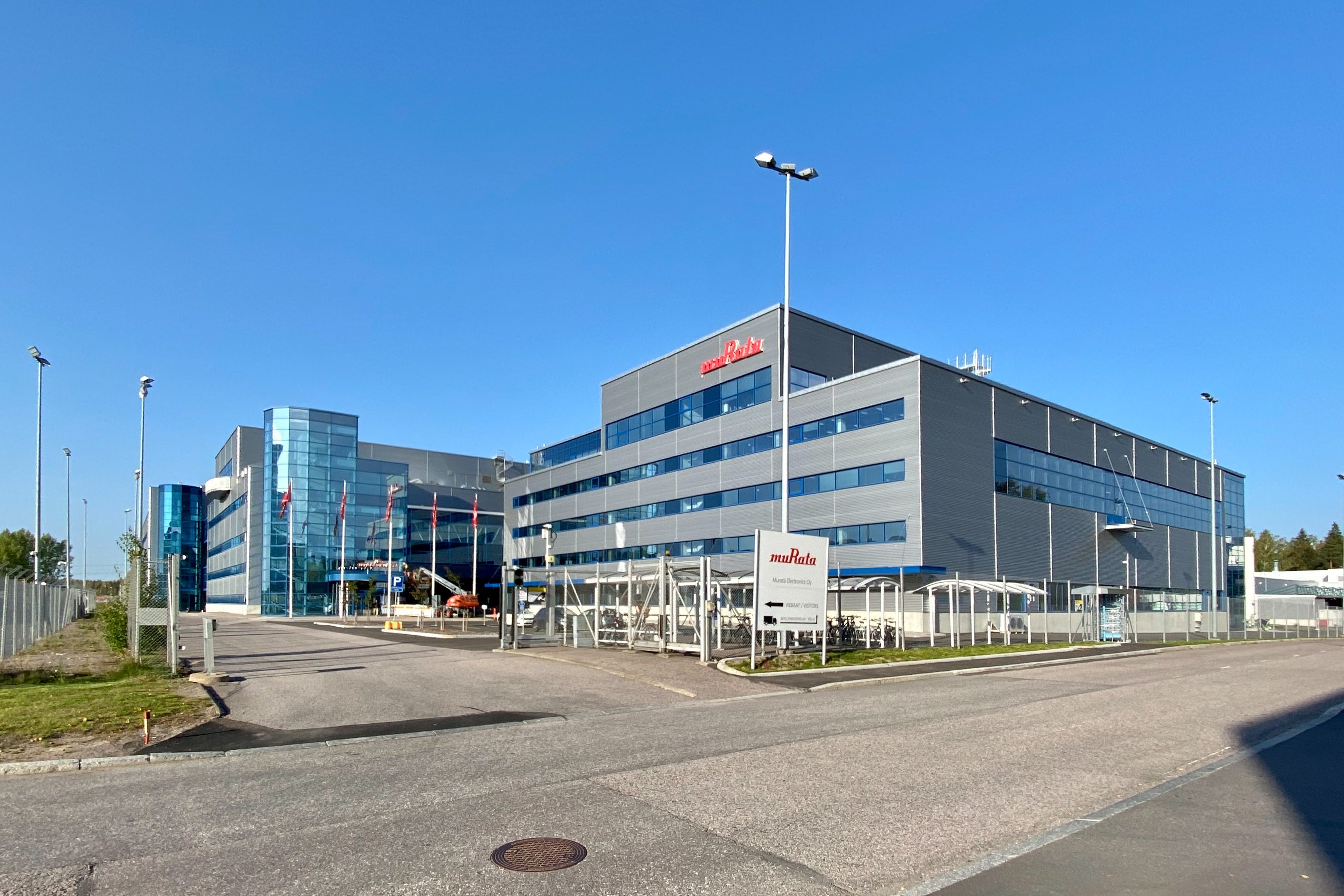
Murata Electronics after the factory expansion completed in 2019

Murata Electronics Oy is a Finnish company (previously called VTI Technologies Oy) that design, develop and manufacture accelerometers, inclinometers and gyro sensors based on the company's proprietary 3D MEMS technology. These sensors are used to measure things such as acceleration, inclination, vibration and pressure. In 2012, VTI Technologies was acquired by the Japanese Murata Manufacturing group, and changed its name to Murata Electronics Oy.

== Products and applications ==
The products are used in automotive industry, industrial applications and healthcare technology. Murata Electronics is the market leading manufacturer and supplier of acceleration and inclination sensors to the global automotive industry and the world's leading manufacturer of motion sensors for electronic stability control systems. In healthcare Murata Electronics is the global market leader in motion sensors for pacemakers. In industrial applications Murata's sensors are used in demanding agricultural and other heavy machinery applications such as harvesters, forest machines, tractors and mining equipment.
