= Polytechnic University of the Philippines Santo Tomas =

Public university in Batangas, Philippines

Polytechnic University of the Philippines Santo Tomas, Batangas
- Politeknikong Unibersidad ng Pilipinas Santo Tomas, Batangas (Filipino)
- Seal Seal of Santo Tomas Branch
- Former names: PUP Santo Tomas Extension; PUP Santo Tomas Campus
- Motto: Tanglaw ng Bayan
- Motto in English: Light of the Nation
- Type: Satellite campus
- Established: January 1992
- Affiliations: State Colleges and Universities Athletic Association; National Athletic Association of Schools, Colleges and Universities; Association of Southeast Asian Institutions of Higher Learning; Accrediting Agency of Chartered Colleges and Universities in the Philippines; International Association of Universities; Philippine Association of State Universities and Colleges
- President: Manuel Muhi
- Branch Director: Dr. Armando A. Torres
- Faculty: est. 100
- Administrative staff: est. 40
- Students: about 3000 students
- Postgraduates: about 100
- Location: Santo Tomas, Batangas, Philippines; 14°06′32.3291″N 121°08′36.7″E
- Campus: Urban
- University hymn: Imno ng PUP
- Colors: Maroon and Gold
- Nickname: PUP Mighty Maroons(system); Tomasinong Iskolar(branch)
- Mascot: PUP Pylon
- Website: www.pup.edu.ph
- Location in Luzon Location in the Philippines

Polytechnic University of the Philippines Santo Tomas, officially as Polytechnic University of the Philippines – Santo Tomas, Batangas Branch (PUP–STB) (translated in Filipino: Politeknikong Unibersidad ng Pilipinas Santo Tomas, Batangas and commonly abbreviated as P.U.P.) is one of the branch campuses of the Polytechnic University of the Philippines located in Santo Tomas, Batangas. PUP–STB was established through a Memorandum of Agreement (MOA) between former PUP President Nemesio Prudente and the Municipal Government of Santo Tomas under Leopoldo Laurel Jr. in 1991. PUP–STB is the only academic institution in Santo Tomas which acts as the community college and serves other municipalities in Batangas and Laguna province.

== History ==
June 10, 1989 marks the history of PUP, it is the date when Hon. Leopoldo M. Laurel, Jr., Municipal Mayor of Santo Tomas envisioned the dreams of establishing a branch in the town by sending a letter of interest and appreciation to Dr. Nemesio E. Prudente, President of PUP. Dr. Dante G. Guevarra initiated the proposal. A deed of donation for a one hectare municipal land was done through Resolution No. 89-18 following the groundbreaking rites on 28 January 1991.

The first office of the director of PUP Santo Tomas was located at the Santo Tomas municipal building and later transferred to the one-story building that also housed the first batch of students, the Lions Club Building.

In school year 1992–1993, the branch accepted the first batch of students with a total number of 292. The courses offered during the year were: Bachelor of Business Administration, Bachelor of Accountancy, Bachelor of Computer Data Processing Management, Bachelor of Office Administration and Bachelor of Electronic and Communication Engineering.

In March 2001, an act passed by the Congress, the R.A. No. 9045, or the act which creates the Batangas State University by integrating different public higher education institutions in Batangas province including PUP Santo Tomas. This led to the protest of the PUP Santo Tomas community not to be part of the Batangas State University, for students of the PUP Santo Tomas will lose the privilege to study at the cheapest cost. The university officials together with faculty, staff and students blocked the entry of the BSU officials into the campus. They also petitioned to the congress to amend R.A. 9045 excluding to its coverage the PUP Santo Tomas.

In May 2007, Republic Act 9472 was ratified, excluding the PUP Santo Tomas Campus from the coverage of the Batangas State University.

To this date the Polytechnic University of the Philippines Santo Tomas is still part of the PUP System and students enjoys the 12 pesos per unit tuition fee.

== Campus ==
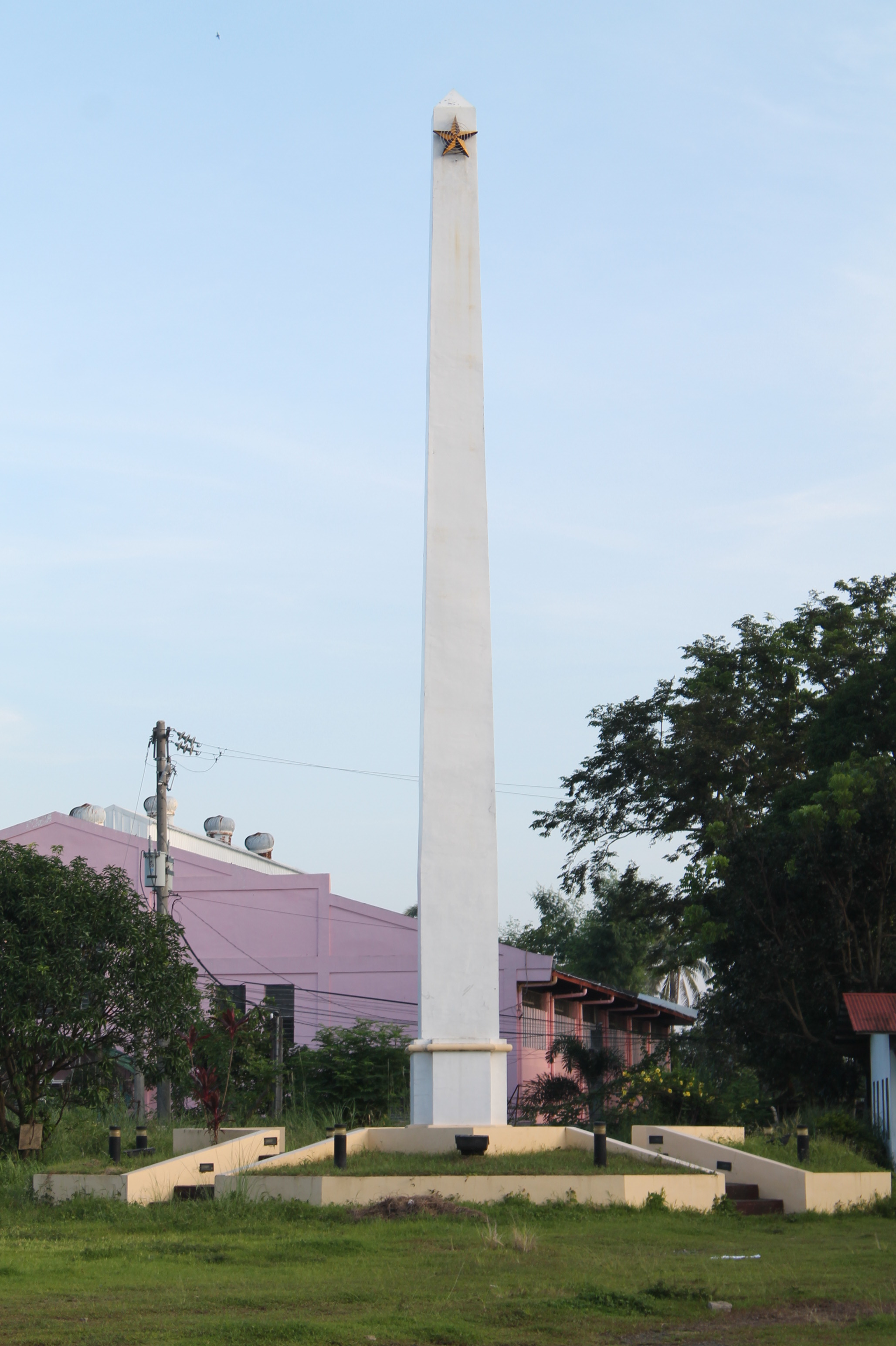
The replica of The Obelisk inside the campus.

The campus of the Polytechnic University of the Philippines Santo Tomas is located inside the municipal center of Santo Tomas, Batangas adjacent to the Municipal Hall and the Public Market with an estimated land area of 1.2 hectares. The campus lies beside the defunct Batangas Intercity Railway. Because of the geographical location of the campus, it can serve both the nearby municipalities and cities in Batangas province and Laguna Province and also is the largest campus of PUP in Southern Luzon.

=== Main Building (MB) ===
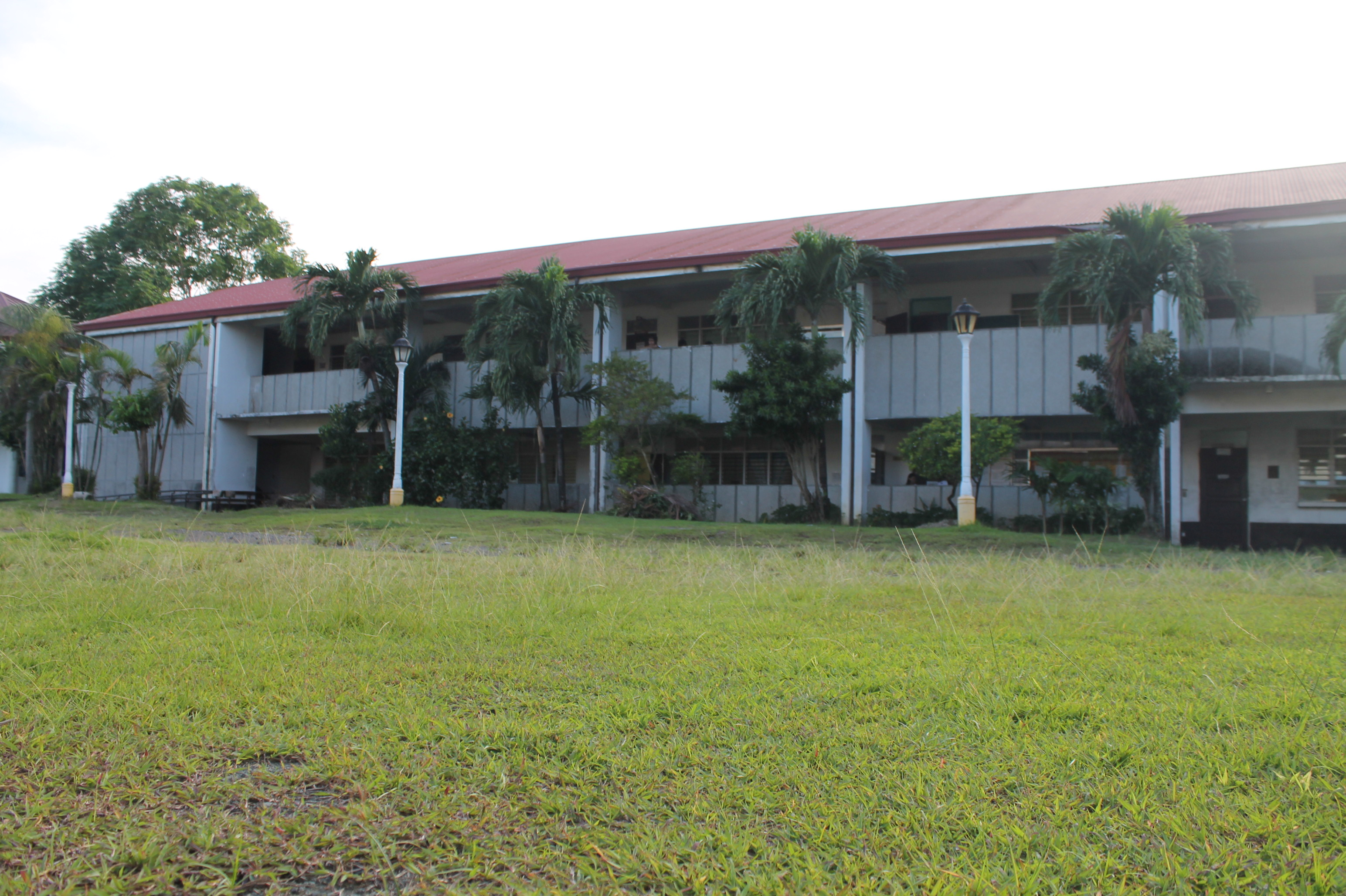
The Leopoldo Laurel Jr. Building of the Polytechnic University of the Philippines Santo Tomas, and is also known as the Administration Main Building

The Main Building (also known as Admin Building) and now named Leopoldo Laurel, Jr. Building is a two-storey building located at the west of the campus. It houses most of the administration offices which are the Student Affairs and Services Section, the Admissions and Registrar's Office, and the Administrative Office. The IT Laboratory, ECE Laboratory, and the Horton Function Room are also located here.

=== New Building (NB) ===
The New Building is a four-storey and largest building located at the east side of the campus. Almost all the departments and colleges are located here—College of Engineering, College of Accountancy and Finance, College of Computer and Information Science, College of Tourism, Hospitality and Transportation Management, College of Social Sciences and Development, and Institute of Technology. Also some administrative offices—the Collecting & Disbursing Office, Accounting Office, and Cashiers Office. Campus Library, EE Laboratory and IE Laboratory are located here also.

=== Cultural Building (CB) ===
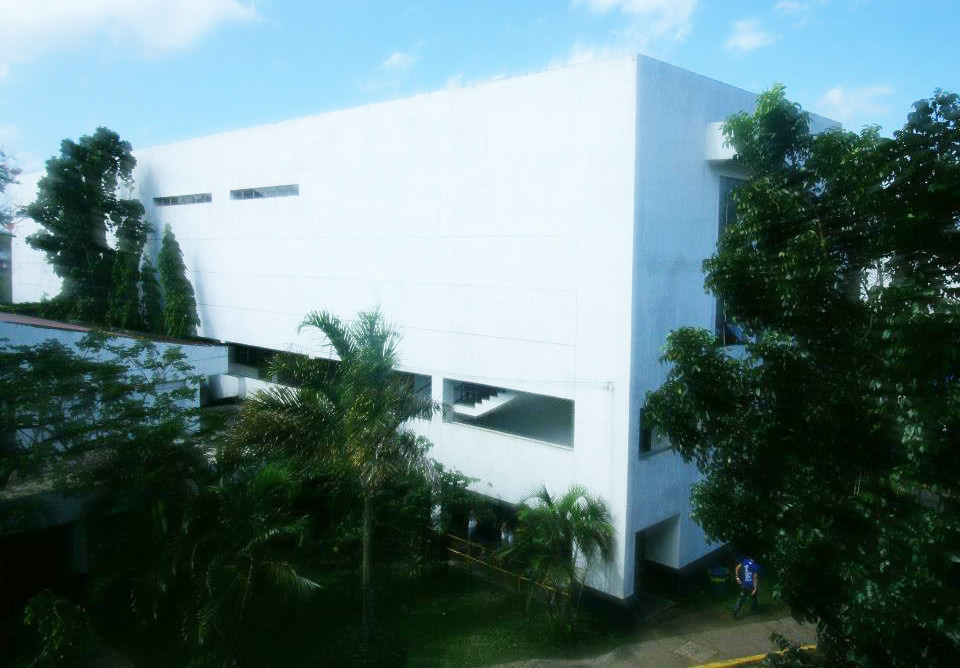
The Cultural Building with the Auditorium at the 3rd floor.

The Cultural Building is 3-storey building located right behind the entrance of the campus. The Cultural Hall, the College of Education, the offices of the cultural organizations, the ROTC office, the PUP Sto. Tomas Varsity locker room and the Cafeteria are situated here. The Office of the Branch Director is also located here.

=== PUP Santo Tomas Gymnasium ===
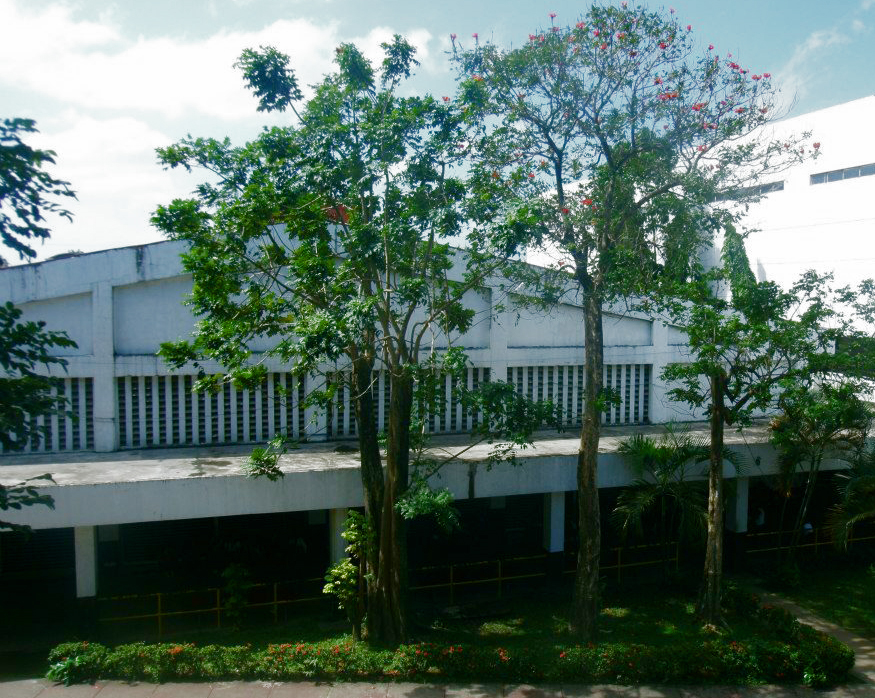
The PUP Santo Tomas Gymnasium

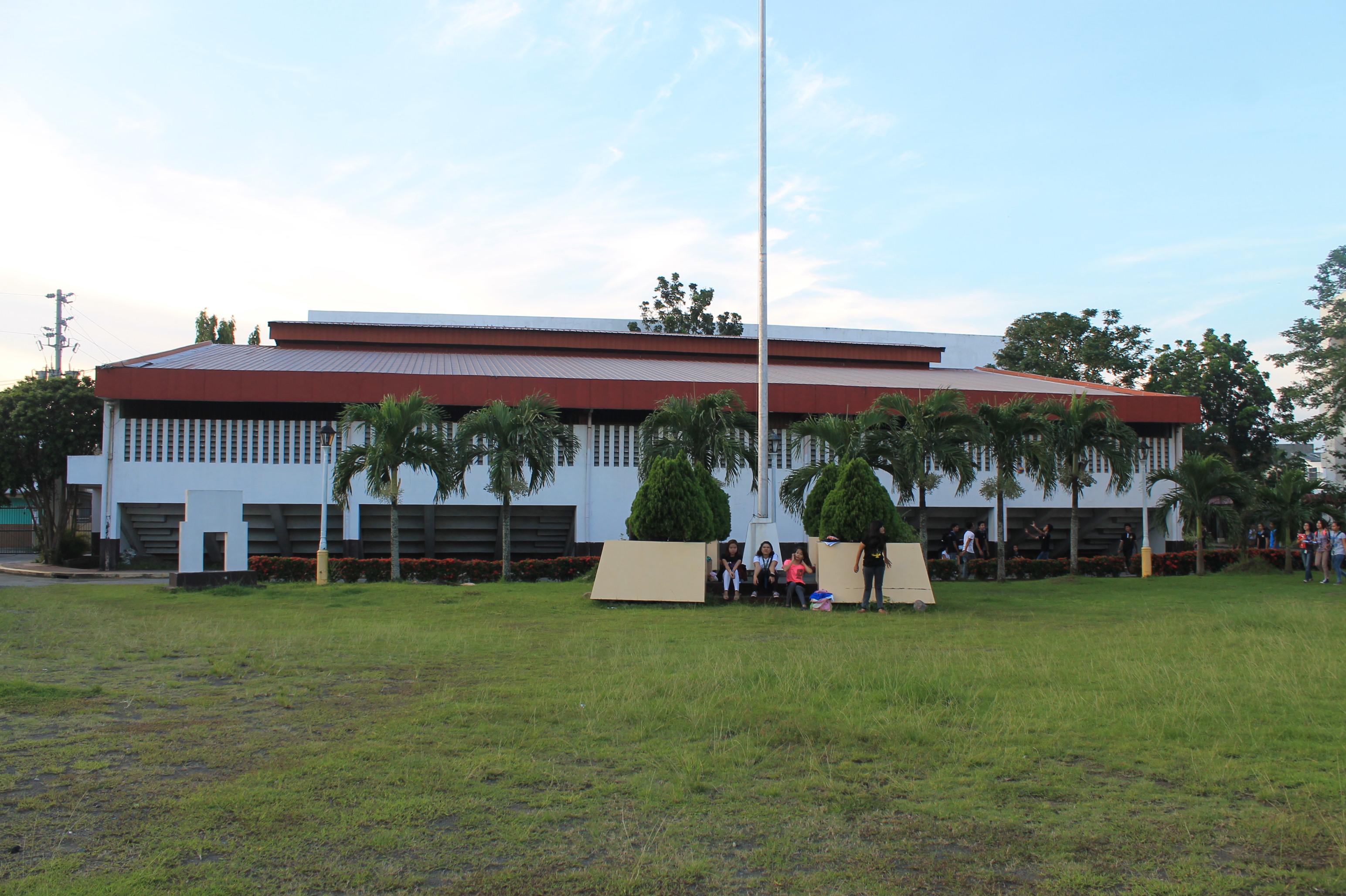
The Gymnasium behind the flagpole.

The PUP Sto. Tomas Gymnasium is where all the P.E. classes are held. It also serves as the event center of the PUP Santo Tomas community and other neighboring institutions in Santo Tomas.

=== Octagon Building ===
The Octagon Building is an octagonal-shaped building located behind the Main Building. It houses the Dental Clinic and the Medical Clinic on the first floor, and the second floor or the roof top serves as a venue open for students' use.

=== Others ===
- The Obelisk: A replica of the Apolinario Mabini Campus Obelisk of PUP Sta.Mesa, Manila.
- PUP Gate: Newly constructed gate/arch of PUP along A. Bonifacio St.
- Catwalk: A covered walkway to the New Building.
- Kiosks: Serves as the Tambayan for PUP students in 3 structures.

== Mandate ==
Presidential Decree No.1341 mandated the PUP to expand the program offerings of the University to include courses in polytechnic areas and has also given the University the authority to expand diametrically through the establishment of branches, consortia and linkages.

College Name	Area Coordinator	Position	Departments	Courses
College of Accountancy and Finance (CAF)	Prof. Rhodora L. Espiritu	Instructor II	Department of Accountancy	Baccalaureate Programs: Bachelor of Science in Accountancy (BSA)
College of Business Administration (CBA)	Dr. Concepcion R. Sumadsad	Assistant Professor IV	Department of Entrepreneurship	Baccalaureate Programs: Bachelor of Science in Entrepreneurship (BSEnt)
College of Computer and Information Sciences (CCIS)	Prof. Melani L. Castillo, DPA.	Instructor II	Department of Information Technology	Baccalaureate Programs: Bachelor of Science in Information Technology (BSIT)
College of Education (CoEd)	Prof. Cleotilde L. Crescini	Assistant Professor I	Department of Business Teacher Education; Department of Secondary Education	Baccalaureate Programs: Department of Business Teacher Education; Bachelor of Business Teacher Education (BBTE); Department of Secondary Education; Bachelor of Secondary Education major in Mathematics (BSEd-MT); Bachelor of Secondary Education major in Social Studies (BSEd-SS); Bachelor of Secondary Education major in English (BSEd-EN)
College of Engineering (CE)	Department of Electronics Engineering; Engr. Hudson Aries O. Oña: Department of Electrical Engineering; Engr. Billy Ray M. Oldan, MScEE: Department of Industrial Engineering; Engr. Romeo G. Ilagan	Instructor I; Instructor I; Instructor I	Department of Electronics Engineering; Department of Electrical Engineering; Department of Industrial Engineering	Baccalaureate Programs: Department of Electronics Engineering; Bachelor of Science in Electronics Engineering (BSECE); Department of Electrical Engineering; Bachelor of Science in Electrical Engineering (BSEE); Department of Industrial Engineering; Bachelor of Science in Industrial Engineering (BSIE)
College of Social Sciences and Development (CSSD)	Prof. Ramil A. Cueto	Instructor I	Department of Psychology	Baccalaureate Programs: Bachelor of Science in Industrial and Organizational Psychology (BSIOP); Bachelor of Science in Psychology (BSPsy)
College of Tourism, Hospitality and Transportation Management (CTHTM)	Prof. Elva B. Villanueva	Instructor I	Department of Hospitality Management	Baccalaureate Programs: Bachelor of Science in Hospitality Management (BSHM)
Institute of Technology	Prof. Ruth R. Oclida	Instructor I	Department of Computer and Office Management; Department of Engineering Technology	Pre-Baccalaureate Programs: Department of Computer and Office Management; Diploma in Office Management Technology (DOMT); Diploma in Information Management Technology (DICT); Department of Engineering Technology; Diploma in Electrical Engineering Technology (DEET); Diploma in Electronics Communications Engineering Technology (DECET)

== University Officials ==
=== Board of Regents ===
PUP's Board of Regents is the governing body of the university. Members of the board include University President, the Chairperson of the Commission on Higher Education, and the Chairpersons of the Committees of Higher Education of the Senate and the House of Representatives. The Board of Regents appoints and elects the president of the university, who is considered the chief executive officer of the institution. The Chairperson of the Commission on Higher Education (CHED) serves as the Chief Chairperson while the president of the university serves as the Co-Chairperson. The Chairpersons of the Committees of Higher Education of the Senate and the House of Representatives functions as committee chairpersons.

Position	Name	Office
Chairman	Hon. Alex B. Brillantes, Jr., Ph.D	Commissioner, Commission on Higher Education
Vice Chairman	Hon. Emanuel C. De Guzman, Ph.D	President, Polytechnic University of the Philippines
Member	Hon. Pia S. Cayetano	Chairman, Commission on Education, Arts and Culture; Senator, Senate of the Republic of the Philippines
Member	Hon. Roman T. Romulo	Representative, Lone District of Pasig; Chairperson, House Committee on Higher and Technical Education
Member	Hon. Arsenio M. Balisacan	Director General, National Economic and Development Authority (NEDA)
Representative	Hon. Margarita R. Songco	Deputy Director-General, NEDA
Member	Hon. Mario G. Montejo	Secretary, Department of Science and Technology (DOST)
Member	Hon. Corazon Alma G. de Leon	Private Sector Representative; Secretary, Board of Governors and Chairman Chapter Development Committee, Philippine Red Cross
Member	Hon. Edicio G. dela Torre	Private Sector Representative; President, Civil Network for Education Reform, Inc.
Member	Hon. Rene A. Tanasas	PUP Alumni Representative; President, Federation of Alumni Association in PUP, Inc.
Member	Hon. Edna S. Lavadia	PUP Faculty Representative; President, PUP Federated Faculty Association, Inc.
Member	Hon. Helen J. Alfonso	PUP Students Representative; President, ANAK-PUP Student Councils Federation
University Board Secretary	Atty. Merito Lovensky D.R. Fernandez	PUP

=== Executive Officials ===
The President of the University exercises the overall leadership in ensuring that the University's efforts are directed towards the attainment of the institutional vision, mission, goals and objectives of PUP. The President works in partnership with his Executive President and six sectoral Vice Presidents, namely: Vice Presidents for Academic Affairs, Administration, Finance, Research, Extension, Planning and Development, Student Services and Branches and Campuses. Each of the Vice Presidents is assisted by directors and other officials for the effective implementation of their functions. Since the PUP is a system of ten branch units and eleven campus units (or also known as LGU units), the Executive Directors of different campuses and branches assist the University President in the supervision of the campus activities through Vice President of Branches and Campuses.

Position	Name
President	Hon. Emanuel de Guzman, Ph.D.
Executive Vice President	Hon. Manuel M. Muhi, D.Tech.
Vice President for Academic Affairs	Hon. Samuel M. Salvador, Ed.D.
Vice President for Research, Extension, Planning and Development	Hon. Manuel M. Muhi, D.Tech.
Vice President for Administration	Hon. Alberto C. Guillo, MS (Stat) MA (Econ)
Vice President for Finance	Hon. Marissa J. Legaspi, CPA
Vice President for Student Services	Hon. Juan C. Birion, DPA
Vice President for Branches and Campuses	Hon. Joseph Mercado, DEM, D CRIM/PhD

=== Branch Administrative Officials ===
P.U.P. Santo Tomas, Batangas Branch is the fifth oldest in branch units and also fifth oldest in the whole system and is the second largest, in terms of land area, in Southern Luzon branches and campuses of the Polytechnic University of the Philippines. The Polytechnic University of the Philippines is governed by the Board of Regents' 13 members, of whom chaired by the Commissioner of the Commission on Higher Education (CHED) and vice-chaired by the President of the University, and 10 members, 2 of which is the Chairperson of the Committees of Higher Education of the Senate and Chairperson of the Commission on Education, Arts and Culture of the House of Representatives. They are concurrent with their functions as committee chairpersons. 2 of the BOR's are Private Sector Representatives, 3 are PUP Presidents of the federations of associations inside the University, 1 University Board Secretary and the rest are Board Members. Each branch/campus of the Polytechnic University of the Philippines is headed by a Director. Dr. Armando A. Torres is again currently the head of Santo Tomas, Batangas Branch. Apart from heading the branch, the director also holds administrative duties that represents the branch in the different academic and non-academic representations in the whole system. The Academic Head is the second highest supervising body of the branch which focuses on different scholastic procedures that students are involved. The following are the branch administrative officials of Polytechnic University of the Philippines Santo Tomas, Batangas Branch:

== Student organizations ==
=== The Big 2 ===
The BIG 2 are the two major organizations in the branch that is spearheaded by students and its officiating members. This organizations are the official student representation and student publication of the university. They are headed by the President for the Central Student Council and Editor-in-Chief for The Searcher.

==== Central Student Council (CSC) ====
The Central Student Council of the Polytechnic University of the Philippines Santo Tomas, Batangas (or simply CSC) is the official student representative body of one of the branches/campuses of the Philippines' first polytechnic university. As such, it represents the interests of the students within and outside the University. The Central Student Council, also known as CSC, exists to represent PUP students in various affairs of the University, acting as the voice of students in the local, national, and international issues.

As the highest student representative body in the university, the CSC is composed of members elected amongst the student body, mandated to organize and direct campaigns and activities to defend and promote students’ rights, and improve the students’ general welfare. Furthermore, it provides direct services to the student body.

==== The Searcher ====
The Searcher, the official student publication of the Polytechnic University of the Philippines, Santo Tomas Batangas, autonomously governed and operated by bona fide PUP-Santo Tomas Batangas students, it holds membership in both Alyansa ng Kabataang Mamamahayag ng PUP (AKM-PUP) and the College Editor's Guild of the Philippines (CEGP). Serving as the student's vanguard against injustices, operational irregularities, and policy violations within the university, The Searcher adheres to its tagline: "Adhering to the Truth, for the Welfare of the People."

The Searcher is the official school paper of PUP and provides news updates about student concerns and activities happening in the Polytechnic University of the Philippines. The Searcher publishes a biannual newsletter and literary folio.
