= Santo Tomas, Batangas =

Component city in Batangas, Philippines

Santo Tomas
- Component city
- City of Santo Tomas
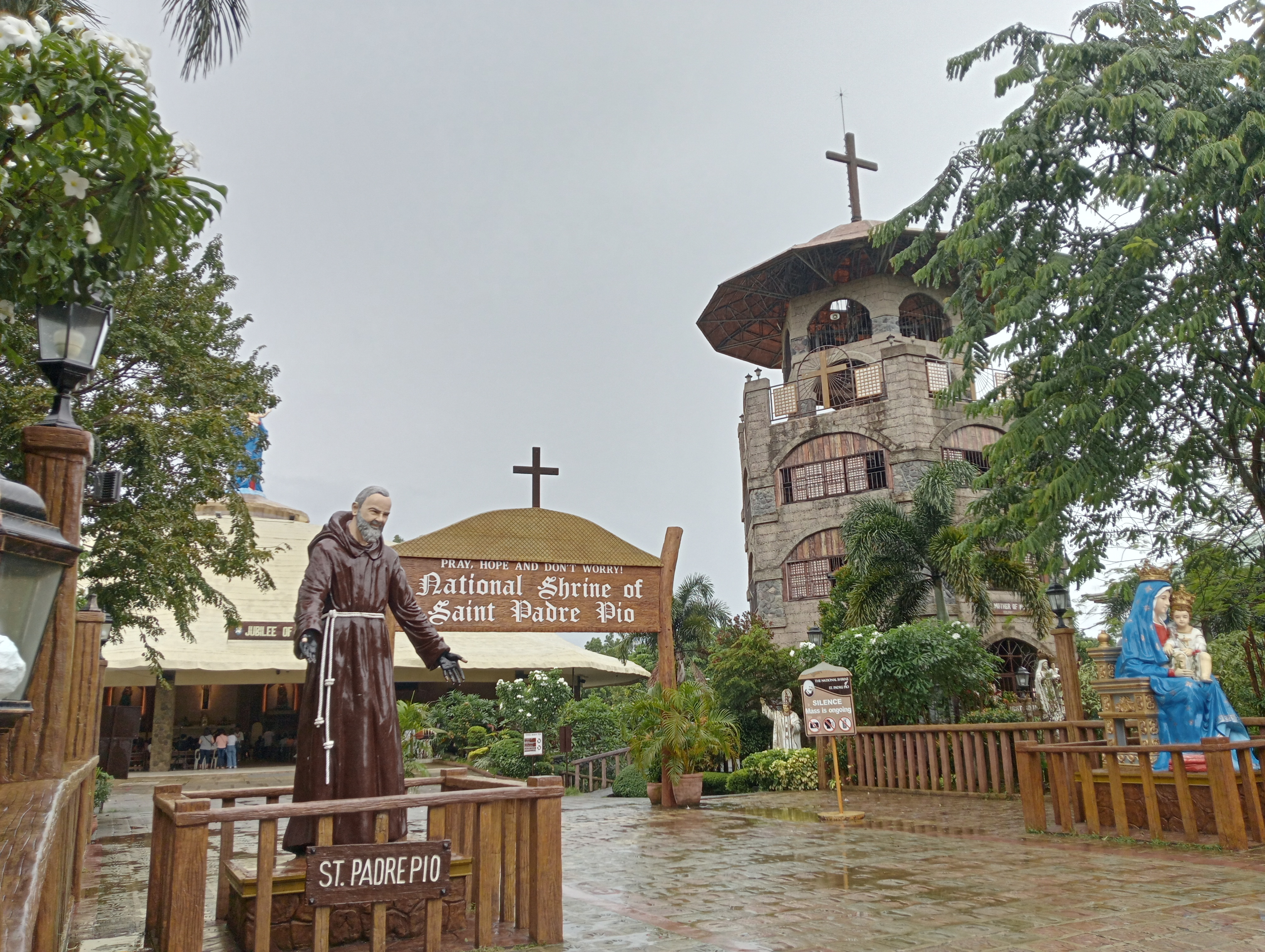
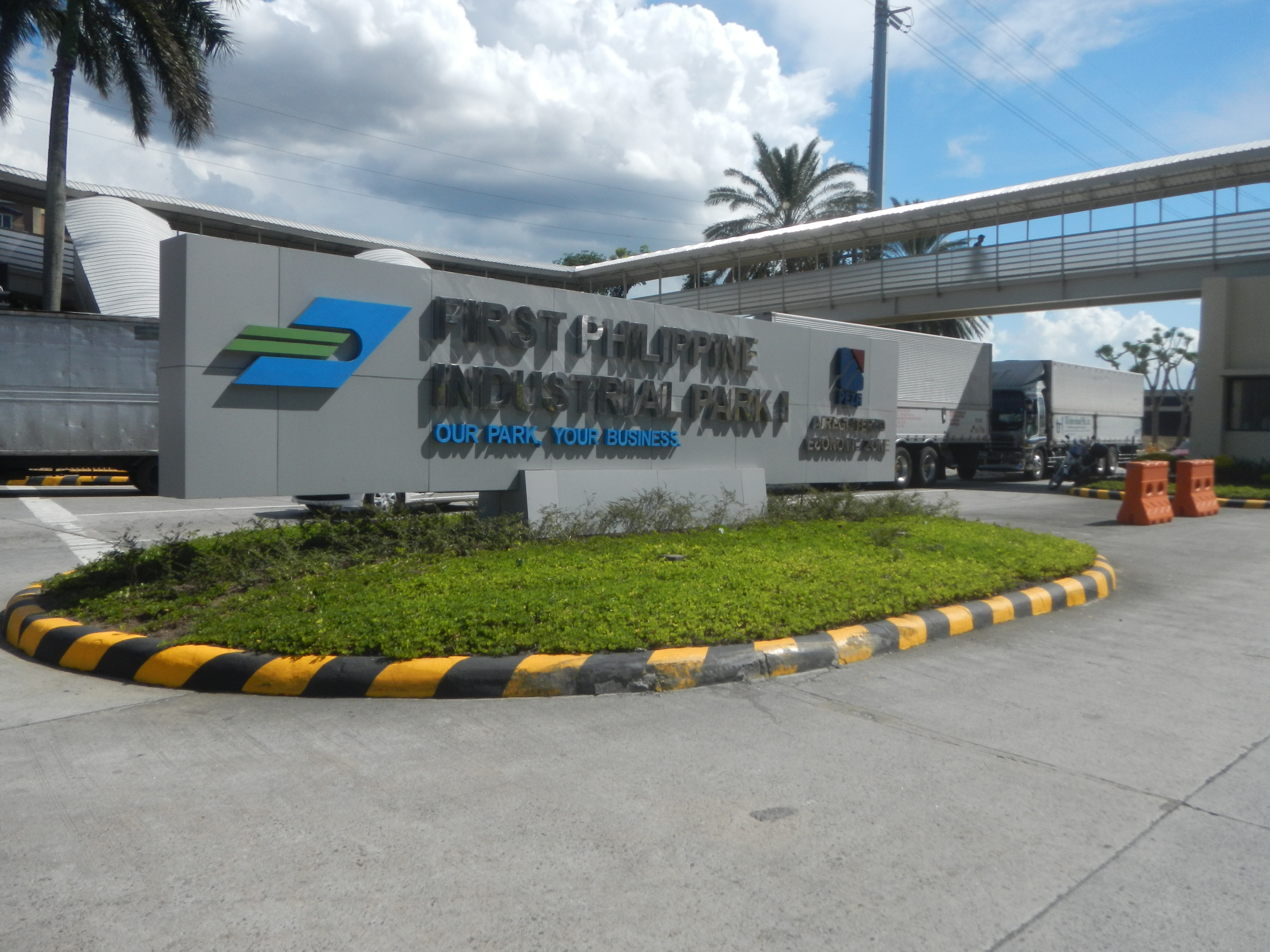
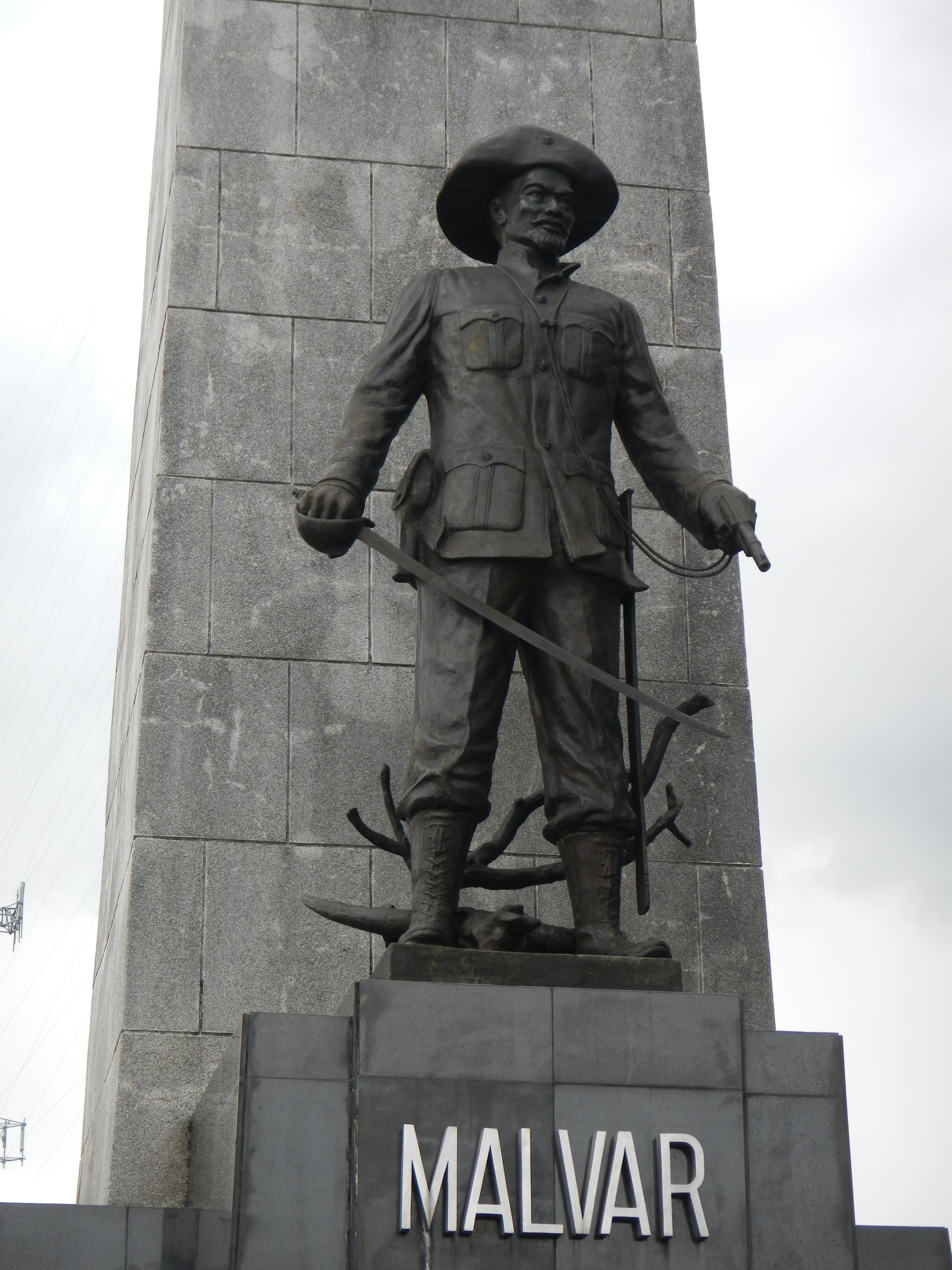
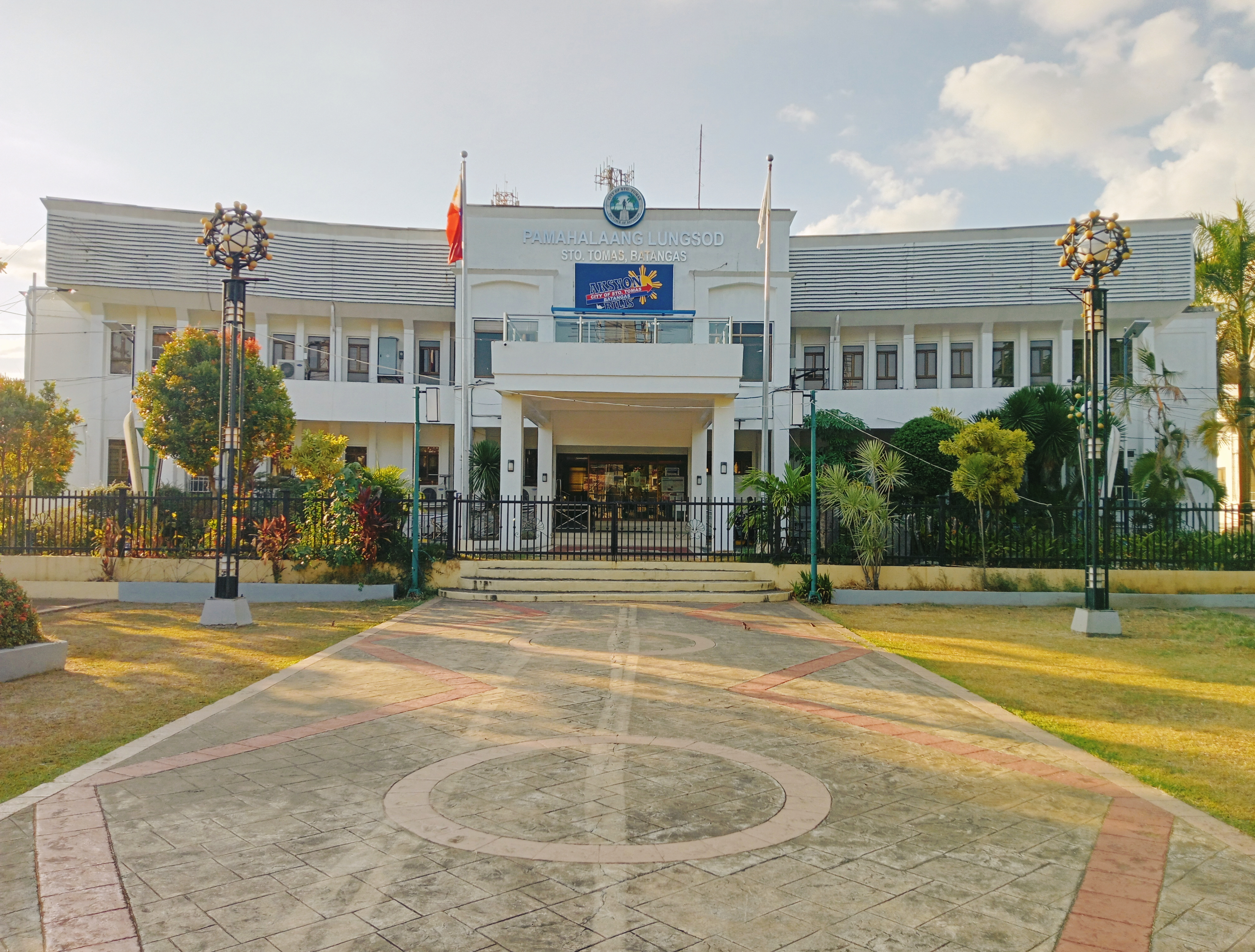
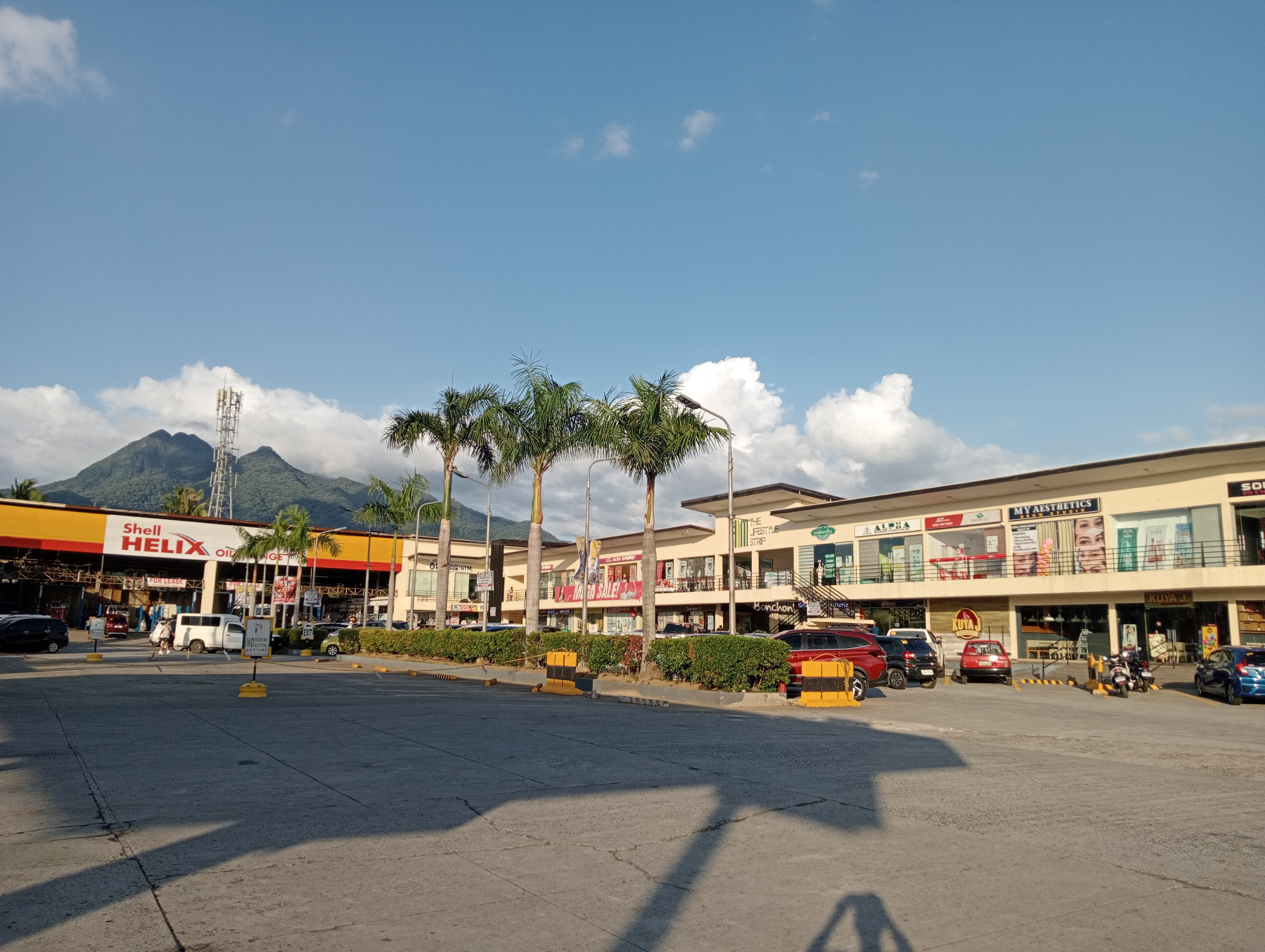
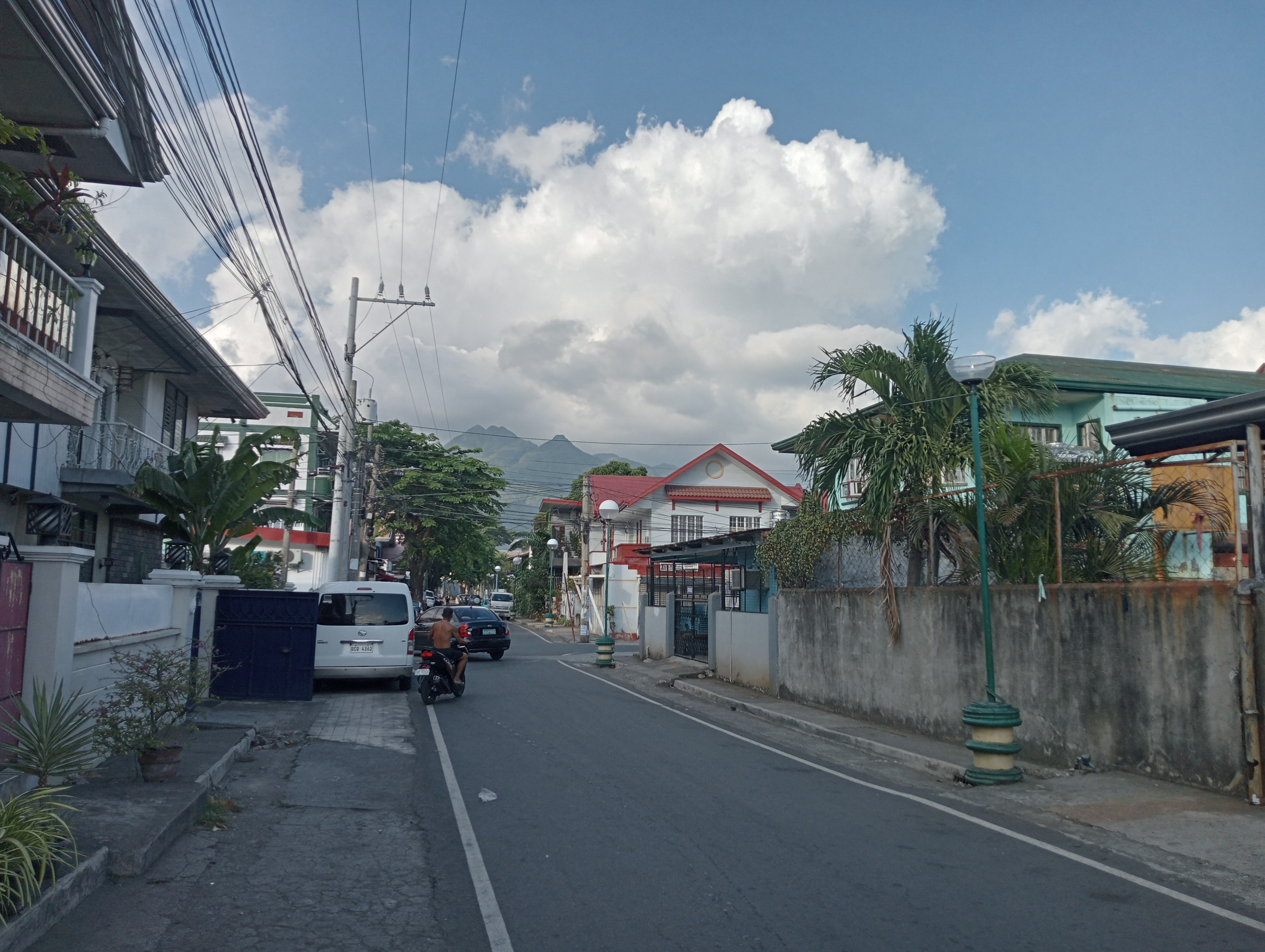
- Clockwise from top: Padre Pio Shrine, First Philippine Industrial Park, Santo Tomas City Hall, A. Bonifacio Street, The Lifestyle Strip, Malvar Shrine, St. Thomas Aquinas Parish Church

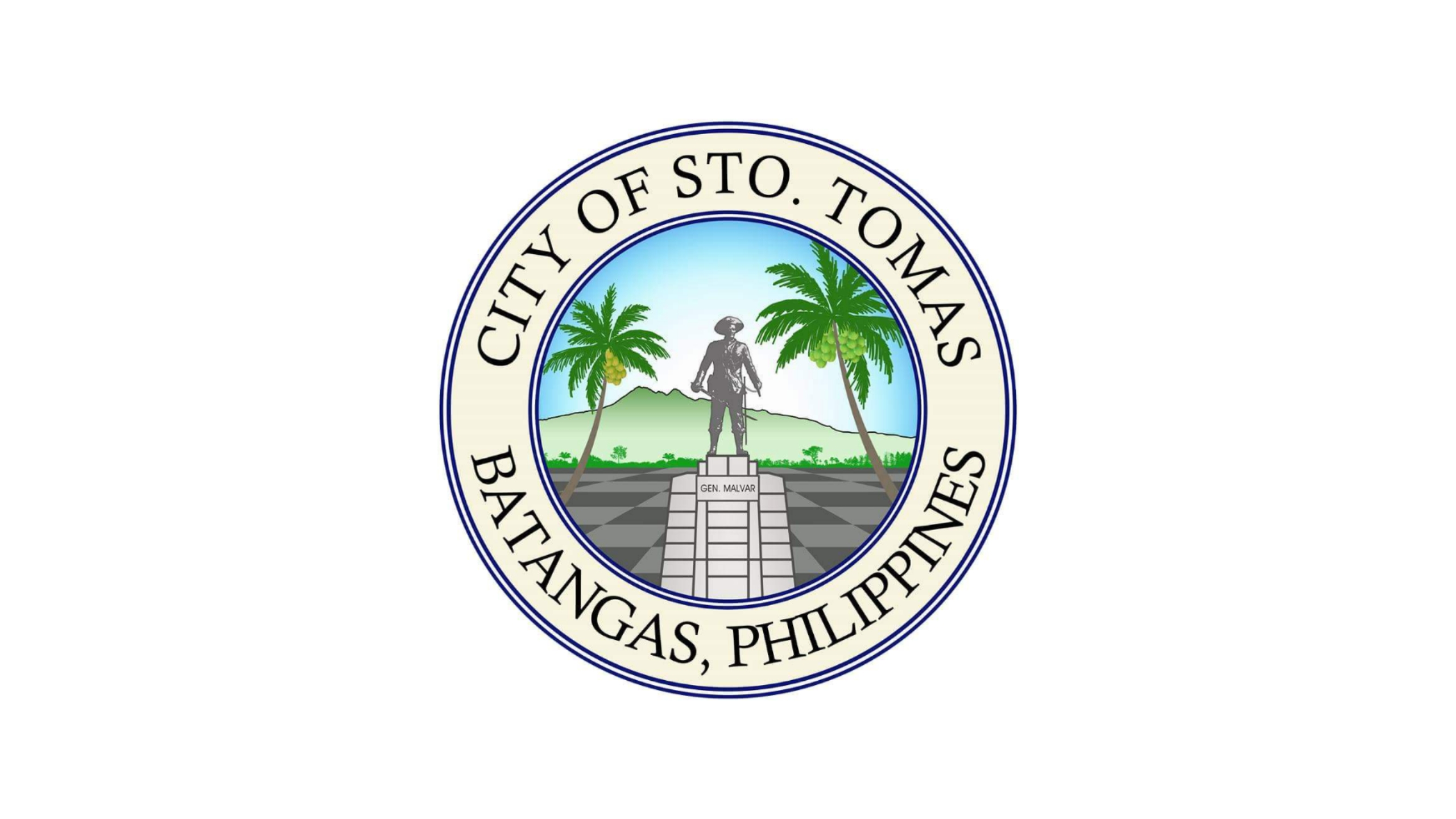
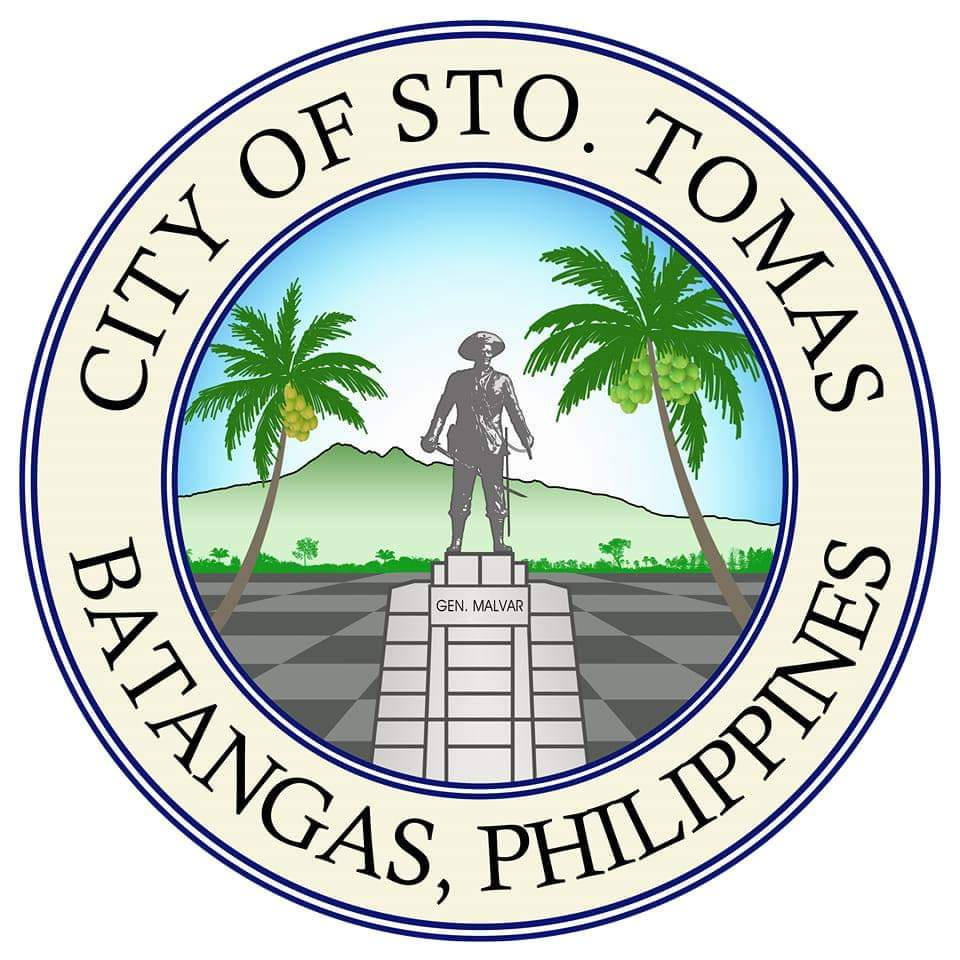
- Flag Seal
- Nickname: Gateway to Batangas
- Motto: Magandang Bukas, Santo Tomas
- Anthem: Ako ay Tomasino (I am a Tomasino)
- Map of Batangas with Santo Tomas highlighted
- Interactive map of Santo Tomas
- Location within the Philippines
- Coordinates: 14°05′N 121°11′E
- Country: Philippines
- Region: Calabarzon
- Province: Batangas
- District: 3rd district
- Founded: 7 March 1666
- Cityhood: September 7, 2019
- Named for: St. Thomas Aquinas
- Barangays: 30 (see Barangays)

Government
  - Type: Sangguniang Panlungsod
  - Mayor: Arth Jhun A. Marasigan
  - Vice Mayor: Catherine J. Perez
  - Representative: King George Leandro Antonio V. Collantes
  - City Council: Members: Ross Allan D. Maligaya; Victor O. Bathan; Leovino M. Villegas; Adrian C. Carpio; Arturo U. Pecaña; Helengrace P. Navarro; Danilo P. Mabilangan; Wilfredo P. Maliksi; Raquel M. Maloles-Salazar; Proceso C. Mendoza
  - Electorate: 124,836 voters (2025)

Area
  - Total: 95.41 km^{2} (36.84 sq mi)
- Elevation: 239 m (784 ft)
- Highest elevation: 1,094 m (3,589 ft)
- Lowest elevation: 5 m (16 ft)

Population (2024 census)
  - Total: 226,772
  - Density: 2,377/km^{2} (6,156/sq mi)
  - Households: 59,686

Economy
  - Income class: 1st city income class
  - Poverty incidence: 3.98% (2023)
  - Revenue: ₱ 2,025 million (2024)
  - Assets: ₱ 5,012 million (2024)
  - Expenditure: ₱ 1,250 million (2024)
  - Liabilities: ₱ 109.3 million (2024)

Service provider
  - Electricity: Manila Electric Company (Meralco)
- Time zone: UTC+8 (PST)
- ZIP code: 4234
- PSGC: 041028000
- IDD : area code: +63 (0)43
- Native languages: Tagalog
- Feast date: March 7
- Patron saint: St. Thomas Aquinas
- Website: https://cityofstotomas.gov.ph/

Santo Tomas, officially the City of Santo Tomas (Filipino: Lungsod ng Santo Tomas), is a component city in the province of Batangas, Philippines. According to the 2024 census, it has a population of 226,772 people.

Santo Tomas got its name from Spanish for Saint Thomas Aquinas, a Catholic saint whose patronal feast day is celebrated every March 7. It is also the hometown of Philippine Revolution and Philippine–American War hero Miguel Malvar, the last Filipino general to surrender to the Americans.

== History ==
The Old Church in Sto. Tomas, Batangas

Santo Tomas was founded in 1666, with Manuel Melo as its first head. Originally, it was composed of a large poblacion. When the Spanish friars arrived, their first and foremost objective was to construct a church near the river to satisfy their inclination for water. Thus, the present site of a Roman Catholic church was chosen near the San Juan River. As years went by, more houses were built around the church. This became the center of the poblacion.

Other groups of houses were scattered all over the area. They were given such odd names as "Kabaong", because of coffin-shaped stones along the road; "Putol" because the trail was cut short by Mount Makiling; "Aptayin", because "apta" or fine shrimps were found in the brook; "Biga", because biga trees abounded there; and "Camballao", as in "kambal" (twin) because twin rivers divided the place. These different unit groups comprised the barrios of the town.

The Spanish changed the original names of the barrios to the names of saints in the Catholic calendar and to place each them under its patrotonio; the former "Pook" and "Aptayin" were joined and called San Bartolome, "Kabaong" was changed to San Vicente, "Biga" to Santa Anastacia, and "Camballao" to San Isidro Sur and San Isidro Norte. The whole town was given the name of Santo Tomas de Aquino, after a saint of the Dominican Order to where most of the first friars belonged. As time went by, more barrios were added to the list each with an assumed name of a saint.

From 1666, the head of the town had different titles, variously known as captain from 1666 to 1782, alcalde from 1783 to 1788, gobernadorcillo from 1789 to 1821, presidente local from 1822 to 1899, presidente municipal from 1900 to 1930, and mayor from 1931 to present.

=== Cityhood ===
In 2016, Nelson P. Collantes, the then-representative of Batangas's 3rd District, filed a House bill to convert Santo Tomas into a component city. After few years, with a unanimous vote of 19–0, the Senate approved a bill for the municipality's conversion into a city on March 19, 2018. On October 5, 2018, President Rodrigo Duterte signed Republic Act No. 11086, making Santo Tomas the first municipality to be converted into a city under his administration. It was effectively ratified on September 7, 2019 through a plebiscite wherein majority of residents who voted approved the cityhood.

== Geography ==
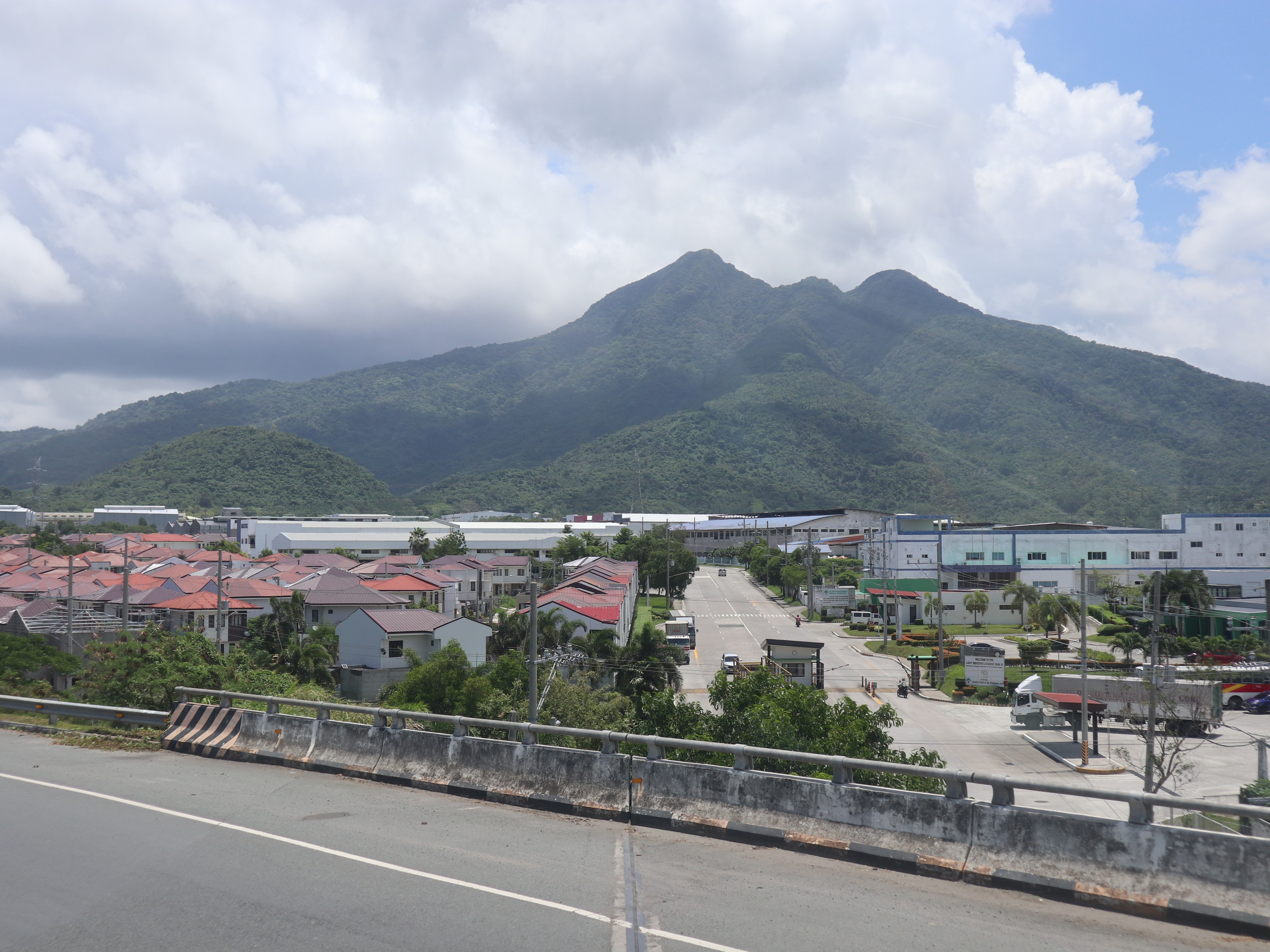
Mount Makiling, Light Industry and Science Park III and Pueblo de Oro as seen from South Luzon Expressway

Santo Tomas is located at 14°05′N 121°11′E. It is situated at the foot of Mount Makiling and is 61 kilometers (38 mi) south of Manila and 44 kilometers (27 mi) from Batangas City. The city is part of the Greater Capital Region resulting from the continuous expansion of Metro Manila. It borders the cities of Calamba to the north, Los Baños to the north-east, Alaminos to the east, Tanauan and Malvar to the west, and Lipa to the south.

According to the Philippine Statistics Authority, the component city has a land area of 95.41 square kilometers (36.84 sq mi) constituting 3.06% of the 3,119.75-square-kilometer (1,204.54 sq mi) total area of Batangas.

=== Barangays ===
Santo Tomas is politically subdivided into 30 barangays, as indicated in the matrix below. Each barangay consists of puroks and some have sitios.

PSGC	Barangay	Population			±% p.a.	
		2024		2010		
041028001	Barangay I (Poblacion)	0.8%	1,846	1,766	▴	0.31%
041028002	Barangay II (Poblacion)	1.2%	2,777	2,291	▴	1.34%
041028003	Barangay III (Poblacion)	1.1%	2,543	1,933	▴	1.92%
041028004	Barangay IV (Poblacion)	1.6%	3,542	2,806	▴	1.63%
041028005	San Agustin	1.1%	2,400	2,374	▴	0.08%
041028006	San Antonio	5.1%	11,657	9,085	▴	1.74%
041028007	San Bartolome	3.2%	7,205	5,897	▴	1.40%
041028008	San Felix	2.4%	5,548	4,388	▴	1.64%
041028009	San Fernando	1.1%	2,507	2,174	▴	0.99%
041028010	San Francisco	1.2%	2,623	2,469	▴	0.42%
041028011	San Isidro Norte	1.0%	2,289	1,663	▴	2.24%
041028012	San Isidro Sur	1.2%	2,653	2,309	▴	0.97%
041028013	San Joaquin	1.9%	4,417	3,844	▴	0.97%
041028014	San Jose	1.2%	2,785	2,160	▴	1.77%
041028015	San Juan	1.4%	3,177	3,012	▴	0.37%
041028016	San Luis	1.3%	2,932	2,414	▴	1.35%
041028017	San Miguel	4.4%	10,087	6,550	▴	3.03%
041028018	San Pablo	2.7%	6,083	5,057	▴	1.29%
041028019	San Pedro	2.5%	5,741	5,202	▴	0.68%
041028020	San Rafael	5.1%	11,654	6,632	▴	3.98%
041028021	San Roque	4.3%	9,745	8,909	▴	0.62%
041028022	San Vicente	5.5%	12,360	8,606	▴	2.54%
041028023	Santa Ana	0.6%	1,432	1,358	▴	0.37%
041028024	Santa Anastacia	6.5%	14,666	7,555	▴	4.70%
041028025	Santa Clara	3.2%	7,231	5,046	▴	2.52%
041028026	Santa Cruz	1.1%	2,504	2,104	▴	1.21%
041028027	Santa Elena	1.0%	2,358	1,638	▴	2.55%
041028028	Santa Maria	12.3%	27,843	10,169	▴	7.22%
041028029	Santiago	2.6%	5,978	4,277	▴	2.34%
041028030	Santa Teresita	0.6%	1,261	1,052	▴	1.26%
	Total		226,772	124,740	▴	4.22%

=== Climate ===
Climate data for Santo Tomas
Month	Jan	Feb	Mar	Apr	May	Jun	Jul	Aug	Sep	Oct	Nov	Dec	Year
Mean daily maximum °C (°F)	28 (82)	29 (84)	31 (88)	32 (90)	31 (88)	29 (84)	28 (82)	28 (82)	28 (82)	28 (82)	28 (82)	28 (82)	29 (84)
Mean daily minimum °C (°F)	19 (66)	19 (66)	20 (68)	21 (70)	23 (73)	24 (75)	23 (73)	23 (73)	23 (73)	22 (72)	21 (70)	20 (68)	22 (71)
Average precipitation mm (inches)	11 (0.4)	13 (0.5)	14 (0.6)	32 (1.3)	101 (4.0)	142 (5.6)	208 (8.2)	187 (7.4)	175 (6.9)	131 (5.2)	68 (2.7)	39 (1.5)	1,121 (44.3)
Average rainy days	5.2	5.0	7.4	11.5	19.8	23.5	27.0	25.9	25.2	23.2	15.5	8.3	197.5
Source: Meteoblue

== Demographics ==
Population census of Santo Tomas

Year	Pop.	±% p.a.
1903	9,488	—
1918	13,125	+2.19%
1939	16,544	+1.11%
1948	17,022	+0.32%
1960	22,716	+2.43%
1970	31,935	+3.46%

Year	Pop.	±% p.a.
1975	37,452	+3.25%
1980	43,010	+2.81%
1990	58,209	+3.07%
1995	65,759	+2.31%
2000	80,393	+4.40%
2007	113,105	+4.82%

Year	Pop.	±% p.a.
2010	124,740	+3.63%
2015	179,844	+7.22%
2020	218,500	+4.18%
2024	226,772	+0.90%

Source: Philippine Statistics Authority

In the 2024 census, Santo Tomas had a population of 226,772 people. The population density was 2,400 inhabitants per square kilometer or 6,200 inhabitants per square mile.

== Economy ==
Poverty incidence of Santo Tomas (%)

Source: Philippine Statistics Authority

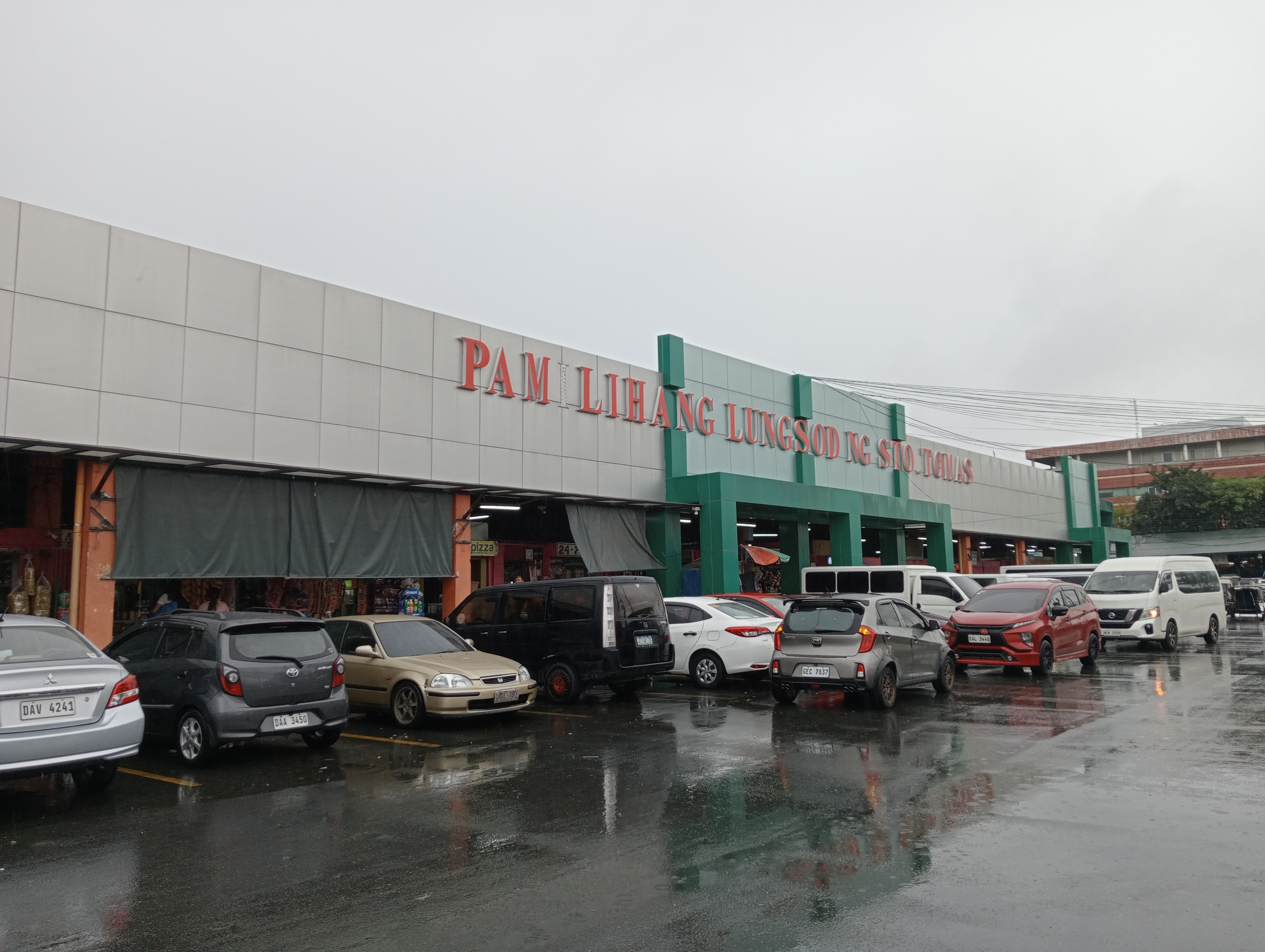
Public market

The First Philippine Industrial Park which is owned by the Lopez Group of Companies is located in the city.

Most of the city is residential with a lot of farmlands. There are also some developed subdivisions along the city like the San Antonio Heights in Barangay San Antonio which was developed by Avida Land, a division of Ayala Land, Camella Homes, and Terrazza de Santo Tomas in Barangay San Roque which was developed by Ovialand. The city is well known for an entire strip of bulalo (bone marrow soup) restaurants and to a hospital named Saint Cabrini Medical Center which is located inside the city center.

Aside from various real estate development in the city, Santo Tomas also has a popular lifestyle and commercial complex in the locality. The Lifestyle Strip, AllHome Santo Tomas, Liana's Junction Santo Tomas, S&R Membership Shopping Santo Tomas, and SM City Santo Tomas are known shopping destinations that operate in the city.

== Transportation ==
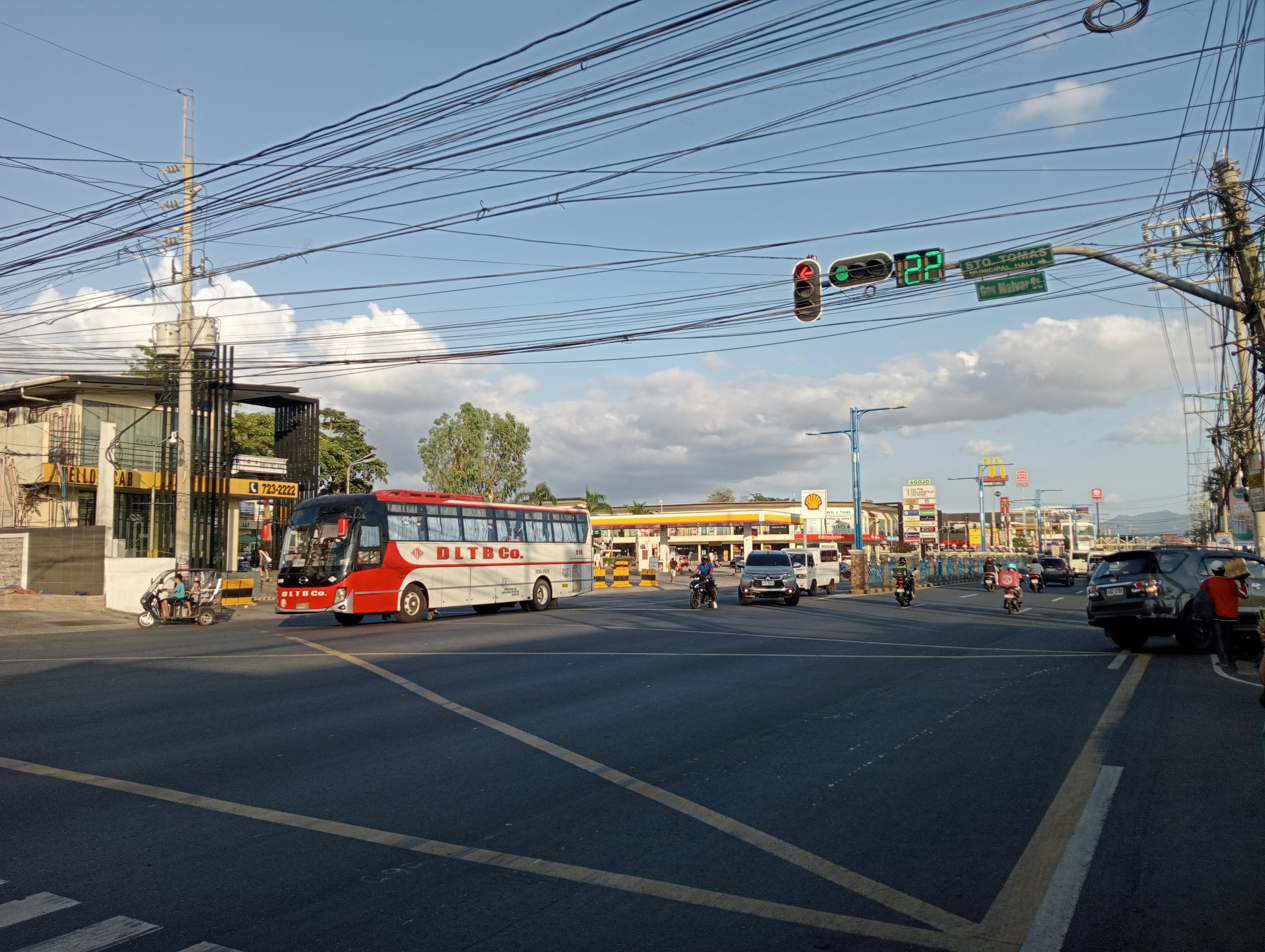
Pan-Philippine Highway (Maharlika Highway) in Santo Tomas

=== Roads ===
The Pan-Philippine Highway or Maharlika Highway connects the city with Calamba, the rest of Laguna, with the highway reaching as far as Bicol Region. Since 2009, the Southern Tagalog Arterial Road (STAR Tollway) and South Luzon Expressway start at the city and connects with Batangas City and Metro Manila, respectively. The Jose P. Laurel Highway connects the city with Tanauan City, Lipa and Batangas City.

=== Public transport ===
Jeepneys (Filipino: "dyip") connect the city with Calamba to the north, Tanauan to the south, and San Pablo to the east. Buses from Manila to Batangas City, Lucena, or Bicol serve the city. UV Express service also connects Santo Tomas with San Pablo, Santa Rosa, Lipa, and Dasmariñas. Tricycles provide transportation within the barangays.

==== Bus lines ====
- Alps The Bus
- JAC Liner
- Lucena Lines
- Dela Rosa Transit
- JAM Liner
- DLTBCo
- Bicol Isarog Transport System
- Davao Metro Shuttle
- Yohance Express Incorporated (passing through via SLEX Cagayan De Oro)
- Elavil Tours Phils Inc
- Superlines Bus Transpotation Corporation
- Daet Express (passing through via Daet Camarines Norte)
- DMMC Travel and Tours Inc
- Cagsawa Travel and Tours
- P&O Transportation
- Barney Auto Lines

== Government ==
=== Local government ===
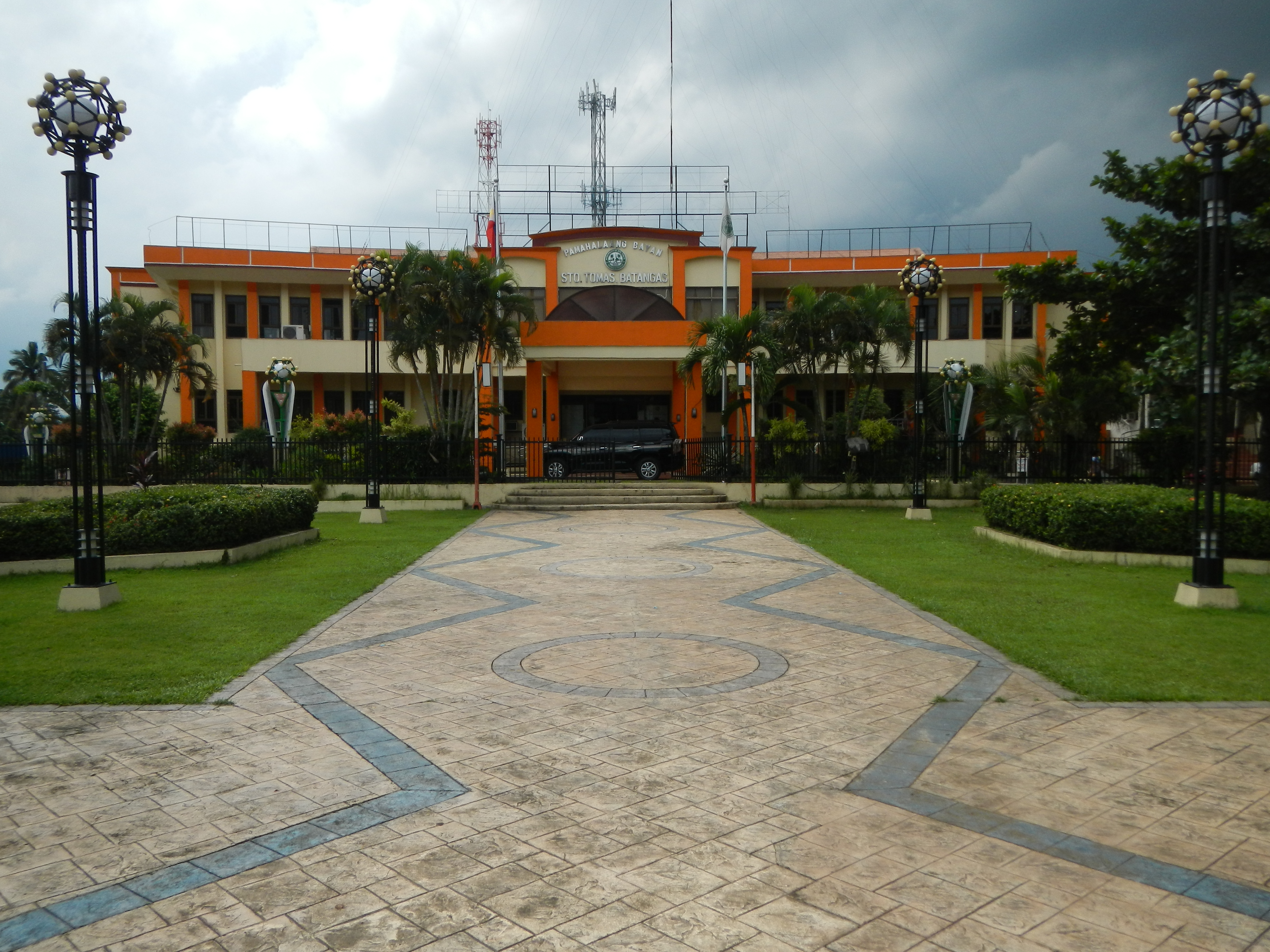
Santo Tomas City Hall

- Mayor: Arth Jhun A. Marasigan
- Vice Mayor: Catherine J. Perez
- Councilors:
  - Ross Allan D. Maligaya
  - Victor O. Bathan
  - Leovino M. Villegas
  - Adrian C. Carpio
  - Arturo U. Pecaña
  - Helengrace P. Navarro
  - Danilo P. Mabilangan
  - Wilfredo P. Maliksi
  - Raquel M. Maloles-Salazar
  - Proceso C. Mendoza
- ABC President: Ladislao M. Malijan
- SK Federation President: Angel Faye Parra

== Education ==
There are two schools district offices which govern all educational institutions within the municipality. They oversee the management and operations of all private and public, from primary to secondary schools. These are the Santo Tomas North Schools District Office, and Santo Tomas South Schools District Office.

=== Public elementary schools ===
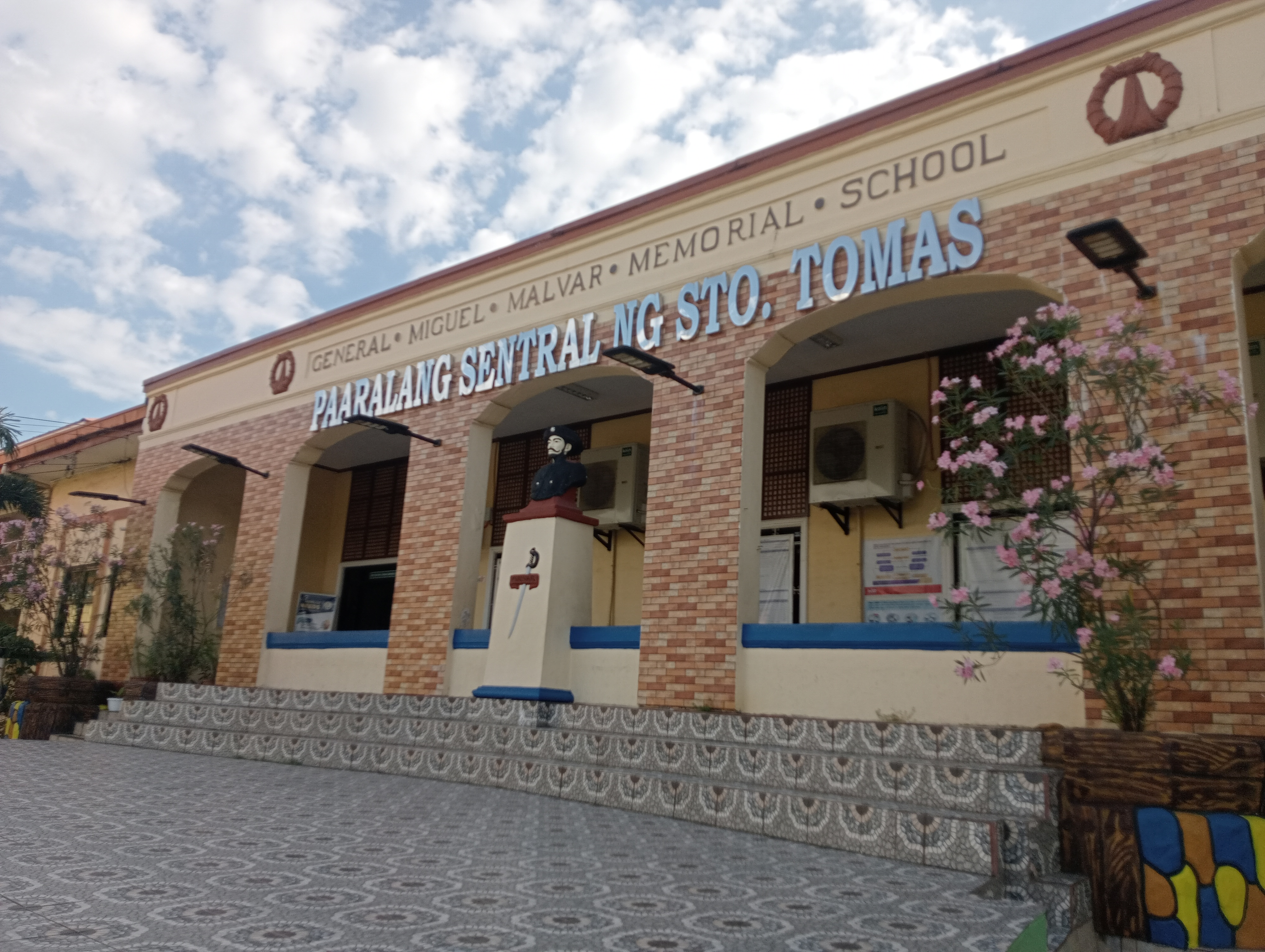
Santo Tomas North Central School

There are 27 public elementary schools within Santo Tomas, all overseen by the SDO of Sto. Tomas City.

==== Santo Tomas North District ====
A. Zone 1

- Santo Tomas North Central School
- San Roque Elementary School
- Santa Cruz Elementary School

B. Zone 2

- San Antonio Elementary School
- Santiago Elementary School
- Santa Anastacia Elementary School

C. Zone 3

- Doña Tiburcia Carpio Malvar Elementary School
- San Bartolome Elementary School
- San Vicente Elementary School

==== Santo Tomas South District ====
A. Zone 4

- Santo Tomas South Central School (formerly San Pedro Elementary School)
- San Francisco Elementary School
- San Isidro Elementary School
- Santa Elena Elementary School
- Santa Maria Elementary School
- Gerardo A. Masarap Elementary School

B. Zone 5

- San Agustin Elementary School
- San Felix Elementary School
- San Jose Elementary School
- San Juan Elementary School
- San Pablo Elementary School
- Santa Ana Elementary School

C. Zone 6

- San Fernando Elementary School
- San Joaquin Elementary School
- San Luis Elementary School
- Santa Clara Elementary School
- Santa Teresita Elementary School

=== Private schools ===
There are 19 private schools within the Santo Tomas.

- Almond Academy Foundation Inc.
- AMS Learning School
- Blue Isle Integrated School
- Clareville School
- Elyon Academia Foundation, Inc.
- Greenville Academy of Santa Clara
- His Care Learning Center of Santa Maria
- Hope Christian Academy of Santo Tomas
- Kids for Jesus Academy Inc.
- Maranatha Christian Academy of Santo Tomas
- Maranatha Christian Academy of Blue Isle
- Mother Barbara Micarelli School
- Nikiesha's Interactive Camp Child Development Center Inc.
- Pedagogia Children's School (Santo Tomas)
- San Bartolome Adventist Elementary School
- Saint Thomas Academy
- Saint Thomas Academy - Avida
- Saint Thomas Montessori Learning Center
- The Golden Child Literacy Place

=== Secondary schools ===
The city has 5 public high schools, all overseen by the Schools Division Office (SDO) of Sto. Tomas City.

- San Jose National High School
- San Pedro National High School
- Santa Clara Integrated National High School (JHS and SHS)
- Santa Anastacia-San Rafael National High School
- Sto. Tomas City National High School
- Santo Tomas Senior High School (SHS only)

=== Higher educational institution ===
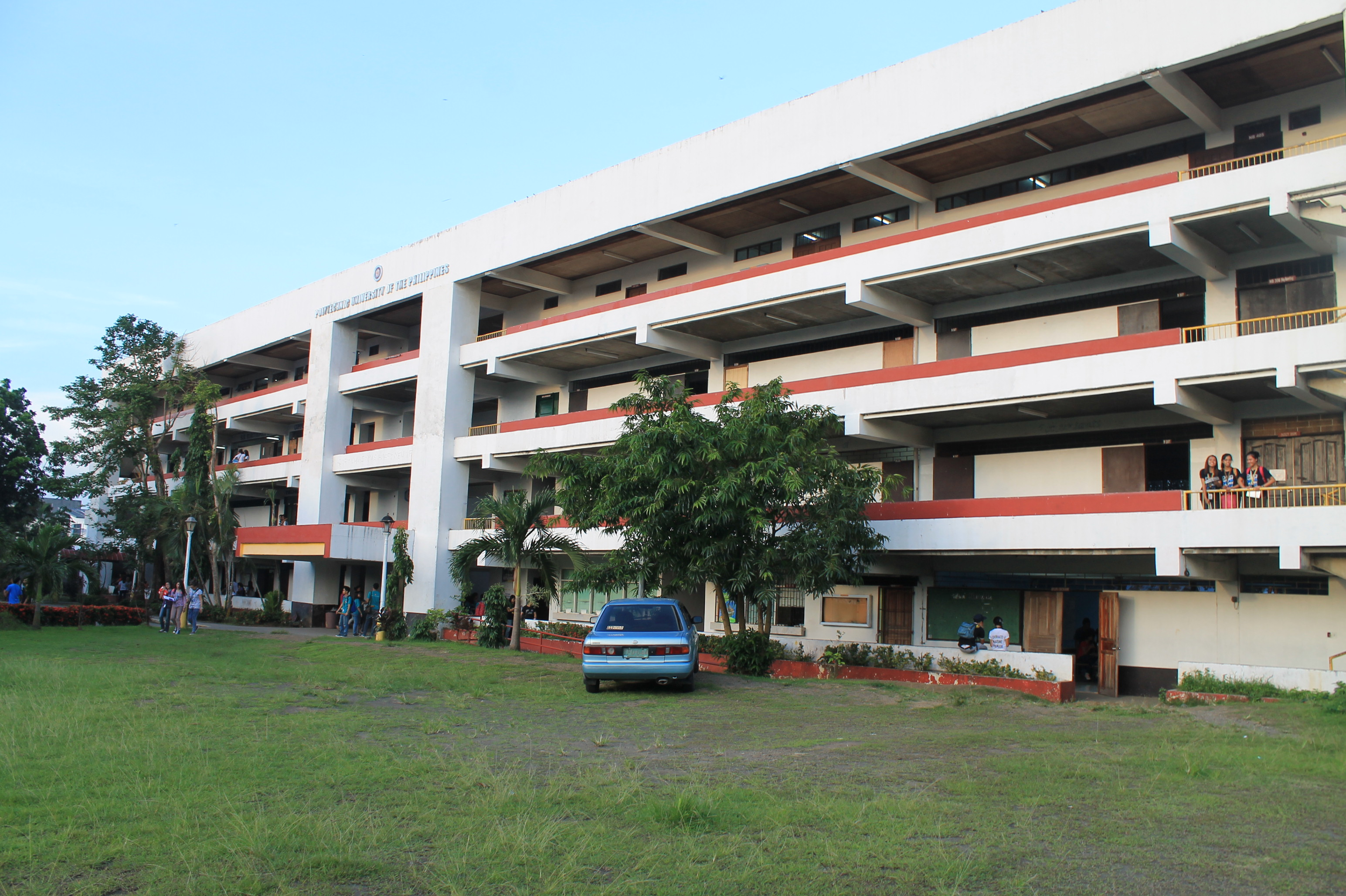
The Polytechnic University of the Philippines Santo Tomas

The Polytechnic University of the Philippines has one Polytechnic University of the Philippines Santo Tomas Batangas campus in Santo Tomas. It is a constituent branch of the PUP System and the only institution of higher learning in Santo Tomas that serves the city and neighboring cities.

== Mythology ==
In Philippine mythology, the homeland of the anggitays is believed to be somewhere in Santo Tomas, Batangas. The anggitays are creatures resembling centaurs but have a single horn on the forehead and are generally female.

== Notable people ==
- Miguel Malvar, Filipino revolutionary general
