= Yasutaka =

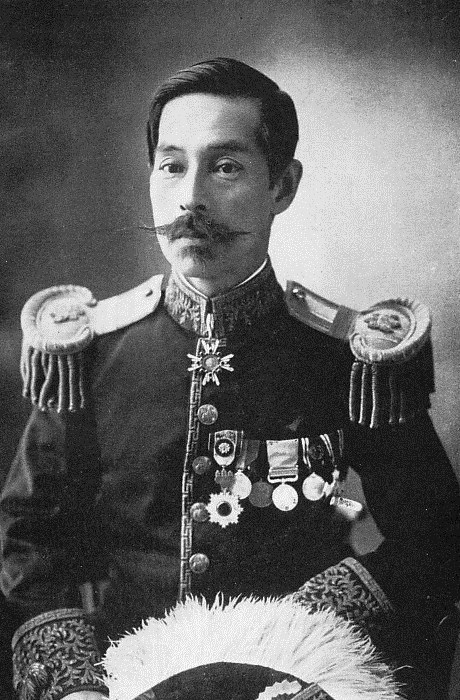
- Yasutaka Matsudaira (1867–1930), Japanese marquis
- Pronunciation: jasɯtaka (IPA)
- Gender: Male

Origin
- Origin: Japanese
- Meaning: Different meanings depending on the kanji used

Yasutaka is a masculine Japanese given name.

== Written forms ==
Yasutaka can be written using many different combinations of kanji characters. Here are some examples:

- 靖隆, "peaceful, noble"
- 靖孝, "peaceful, filial piety"
- 靖貴, "peaceful, precious"
- 靖喬, "peaceful, high"
- 靖高, "peaceful, tall"
- 靖昂, "peaceful, rise"
- 康隆, "healthy, noble"
- 康孝, "healthy, filial piety"
- 康貴, "healthy, precious"
- 康喬, "healthy, high"
- 康高, "healthy, tall"
- 康昂, "healthy, rise"
- 安隆, "tranquil, noble"
- 安孝, "tranquil, filial piety"
- 安貴, "tranquil, precious"
- 安高, "tranquil, tall"
- 保隆, "preserve, noble"
- 保孝, "preserve, filial piety"
- 保貴, "preserve, precious"
- 泰隆, "peaceful, noble"
- 泰孝, "peaceful, filial piety"
- 易昂, "divination, rise"

The name can also be written in hiragana やすたか or katakana ヤスタカ.

== Notable people with the name ==
- Yasutaka Hattori (服部 泰卓; born 1982), Japanese baseball player
- Yasutaka Ihara (伊原 康隆; born 1938), Japanese mathematician
- Yasutaka Kobayashi (小林 康剛; born 1980), Japanese footballer
- Yasutaka Matsudaira (松平 康荘, 1867–1930), Japanese marquis
- Yasutaka Murata (村田 泰隆; born 1947), Japanese businessman
- Yasutaka Nakata (中田 康貴; born 1980), Japanese musician
- Yasutaka Okamoto (岡本 保孝; 1797–1878), Japanese kokugaku scholar
- Yasutaka Okayama (岡山 恭崇; born 1954), Japanese basketball player
- Yasutaka Sasshunada (薩洲洋 康貴; born 1957), Japanese sumo wrestler
- Yasutaka Sato (佐藤 安孝; born 1940), Japanese volleyball player
- Yasutaka Tashiro (田代 恭崇; born 1974), Japanese cyclist
- Yasutaka Tsutsui (筒井 康隆; born 1934), Japanese writer and actor
- Yasutaka Uchiyama (内山 靖崇; born 1992), Japanese tennis player
- Yasutaka Yoshida (吉田 安孝; born 1966), Japanese footballer
