= Akira Murata =

Japanese businessman (1921–2006)

Akira Murata (村田 昭 Murata Akira; March 25, 1921 – February 3, 2006) was a Japanese businessman and the founder of Murata Manufacturing. He was the President/Statutory Representative Director from 1950 to 1991. From 1995 onward, he held the position of Honorary Chairman.

== Biography ==
Murata was born in Higashiyama, Kyoto.

== Honours ==
- Medal with Blue Ribbon of Japan or Ranju Hosho, Japan (1980)
- Order of Merit of the Federal Republic of Germany First Class, Germany (1986)
- Order of the Sacred Treasure, Gold and Silver Star of Japan (Kun-ni-to Zuihosho), Japan (1993)
