= Sony Energy Devices Corporation =

Japanese energy devices manufacturer and subsidiary of Sony

- Native name: ソニーエナジー・デバイス株式会社
- Romanized name: Sonī Enajī Debaisu Kabushiki Gaisha
- Type: Subsidiary
- Industry: Batteries; Renewable energy
- Founded: February 1975
- Headquarters: Koriyama-shi, Fukushima, Japan
- Area served: Worldwide
- Key people: Yoshito Ezure (president)
- Products: Micro batteries Lithium-ion rechargeable batteries Energy storage modules
- Revenue: 173 billion yen (2014)
- Number of employees: 2,045 (as of April, 2015)
- Parent: Sony Group Corporation

Sony Energy Devices Corporation (ソニーエナジー・デバイス株式会社, Sonī Enajī Debaisu Kabushiki Gaisha), is a Japanese multinational company specializing in a variety of areas in the energy industry, and is a wholly owned subsidiary and part of the Devices Group of Sony. The company was established in February 1975 in Fukushima, Japan.

Sony Energy Devices Corporation handles the development, design and manufacturing of primary and rechargeable cell batteries that can be used for many applications like mobile phones, tablets, laptops, digital cameras, power tools, robotic cleaners, watches, calculators, energy storage for data servers and homes, etc. In 2016, Sony and Japanese company Murata Manufacturing reached an agreement to sell Sony's lithium-ion battery business. This transfer of business was completed on September 1, 2017. The new company has been named Tohoku Murata Manufacturing. The sales department for Sony-branded consumer battery products and some other operations are still in business under Sony Energy Devices Corporation.

== History ==
=== Foundation ===
Sony Energy Devices Corporation started in February, 1975 as Sony-Eveready a joint venture between Sony Corp and Union Carbide Corp of United States to design and manufacture batteries. In April, 1986 the joint venture dissolved and name changed to Sony Energytec.

=== Expansion ===
Between 1977 and 2000 Sony Energytec started production of many primary and secondary battery technologies, such as silver oxide batteries, alkaline-manganese dry batteries and lithium-ion batteries. In 2000 Sony Energytec merged with Sony Motomiya to form Sony Fukushima. In 2006 Sony Fukushima merged with Sony Tochigi to form Sony Energy Devices Corp.

Esstalion Technologies, Inc was established in June, 2014 as a joint venture between Sony and Hydro-Québec.

=== Timeline ===
- 1975 – Sony-Eveready established as joint venture between Sony Corp and Union Carbide Corp.
- 1977 – Production of silver oxide batteries.
- 1979 – Production of alkaline-manganese dry battery.
- 1982 – Production of lithium coin batteries.
- 1986 – The joint venture dissolved and name changed to Sony Energytec.
- 1991 – Production of lithium-ion batteries.
- 1998 – Started lithium-ion battery electrodes.
- 1999 – Production of lithium-ion polymer batteries.
- 2000 – Started power supply unit business.
- 2000 – Sony Energytec merged with Sony Motomiya to form Sony Fukushima.
- 2004 – Sony Fukushima merged with Sony Tochigi to form Sony Energy Devices Corp.
- 2006 – Production of lithium-ion battery pack.
- 2014 – Establishment of Esstalion Technologies, Inc., a joint venture between Sony and Hydro-Québec.
- 2016 – Sony Energy Devices agreed to transfer its battery business to Murata.
- 2017 – Transfer of the battery business to Murata is completed.

== See also ==
- Lithium-ion battery
- Lithium-ion polymer battery
- Silver oxide battery
- Alkaline battery
- Lithium ion manganese oxide battery
