= Murata Manufacturing =

Japanese electronic components manufacturer

Murata Manufacturing Company, Ltd. 株式会社村田製作所

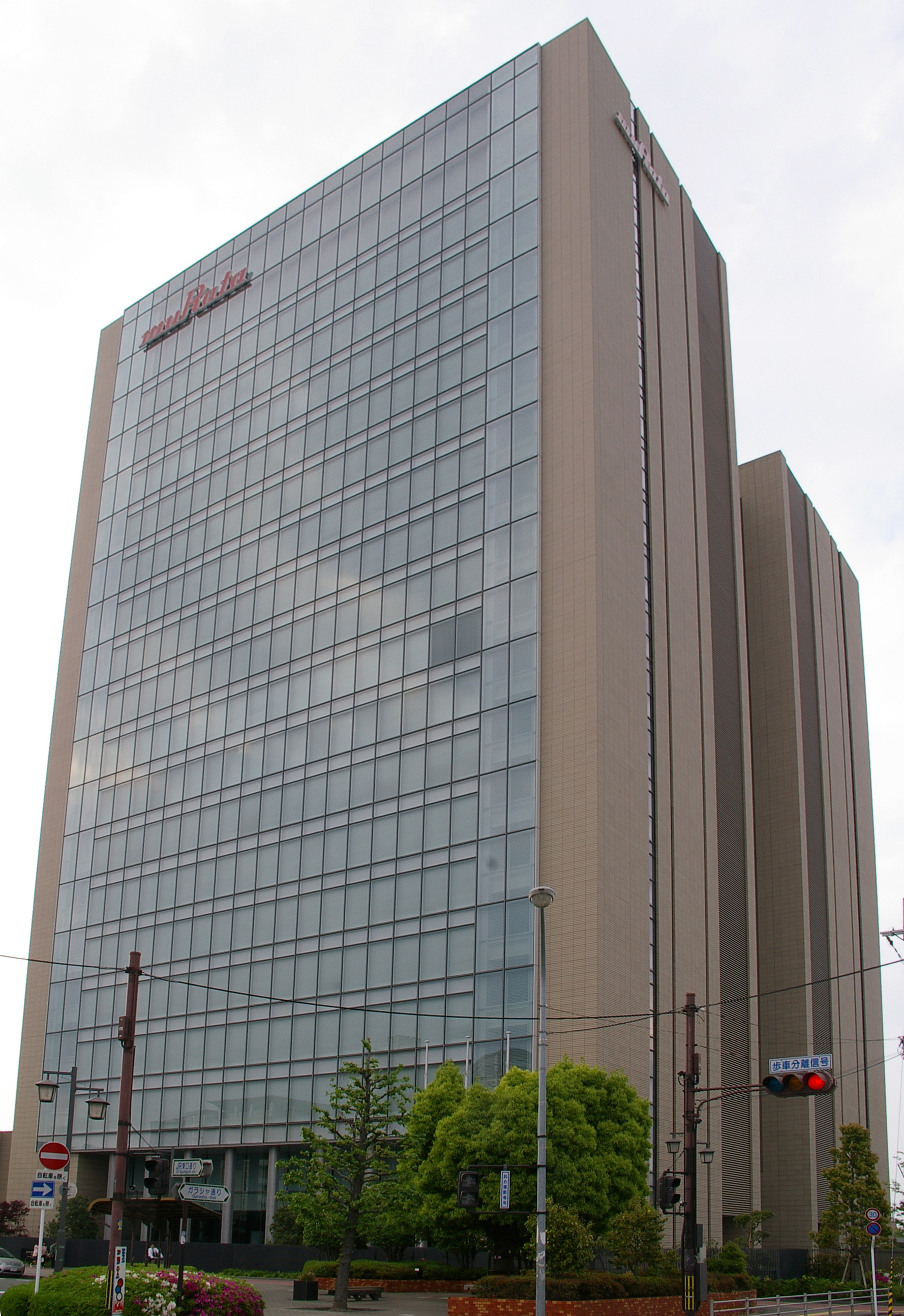
- Head office of Murata Manufacturing in Nagaokakyo, Kyoto Prefecture, Japan
- Type: Public KK
- Traded as: TYO: 6981; SGX: M20; TOPIX Core 30 Component; Nikkei 225 Component
- Industry: Electronic components
- Founded: Kyoto, Japan (October 1944; 81 years ago)
- Founder: Akira Murata
- Headquarters: 10-1, Higashikotari 1-chome, Nagaokakyo-shi, Kyoto Prefecture 617-8555, Japan
- Key people: Norio Nakajima, President
- Products: Monolithic ceramic capacitors; SAW filters; Ceramic resonators; Piezoelectric sensors; Ceramic filters; Piezoelectric buzzers; Short-range wireless modules; Communication modules (including Bluetooth® modules); Multilayer ceramic devices; Connectors; Isolators; Power supplies; Circuit modules; EMI Suppression filters; Inductor (coils); Sensors
- Revenue: ▲¥1.74 trillion (2025)
- Operating income: ▲¥280 billion (2025)
- Net income: ▲¥233 billion (2025)
- Total assets: ▲¥3.03 trillion (2025)
- Total equity: ▲¥2.26 trillion (2025)
- Number of employees: 72,572 (March 31, 2025)
- Website: www.murata.com

Murata Manufacturing Co., Ltd. (株式会社村田製作所, Kabushiki-gaisha Murata Seisakusho) is a Japanese manufacturer of electronic components, based in Nagaokakyo, Kyoto. It produces ceramic passive electronic components, primarily capacitors, and has a majority marketshare worldwide in ceramic filters, high-frequency parts, and sensors. As of March 31, 2025 Murata Manufacturing has 84 subsidiaries globally (29 in Japan and 55 overseas in the United States, Canada, Mexico, Brazil, Germany, France, Italy, the United Kingdom, Switzerland, the Netherlands, Spain, Hungary, Finland, China, Taiwan, South Korea, Singapore, Malaysia, the Philippines, Thailand, Hong Kong, Vietnam and India.

== History ==
Akira Murata founded Murata Manufacturing as a personal venture in October, 1944. In December 1950, the company was reorganized into Murata Manufacturing Co., Ltd., with paid-in capital of ¥1 million.

On April 13, 2012, Murata announced a deal to acquire RF Monolithics for $1.78 per share. On August 23, 2014, Murata announced the acquisition of Peregrine Semiconductor Corporation. On July 28, 2016, a memorandum of understanding was signed between Murata and Sony announcing the intent to sell a portion of the latter's battery business (Sony Energy Devices Corporation).

In October 2017, Murata announced sponsorship of an exhibit in the Epcot theme park at Florida's Walt Disney World. Entitled The SpectacuLAB, the science oriented presentation emphasizes STEM themes in support of children's education. Murata also bought Sony's battery business.

On December 15, 2020, Murata announced the opening of a new research and development center dedicated to automotive applications in Minatomirai, Yokohama, Kanagawa Prefecture. On March 28, 2022, Murata announced the acquisition of Resonant Inc for $4.50 a share.

== Products ==
Murata has a variety of electronic products ranging from communication and wireless modules to power supplies. The company manufactures integrated components and RF filters based on different processing technologies like thin-film, thick-film, and LTCC (Low Temperature Co-fired Ceramics). This includes monolithic ceramic capacitors, multilayer ceramic devices, chip inductors, SAW filters, crystal filters, LC filters, ceramic resonators, and others. Murata conducts research on new technology related to RF components, which has led it to acquire many patents. Murata holds several patents and patent applications for technology related to ceramic capacitors.

In December 2021, Murata co-developed with Michelin a RFID module that is embedded into the tire that keeps track of inventory, allows for aftermarket maintenance, and assists with the recycling of the tire at the end of the product life cycle. The tags require no external power supply and will operate over high mileages.

== Gallery ==
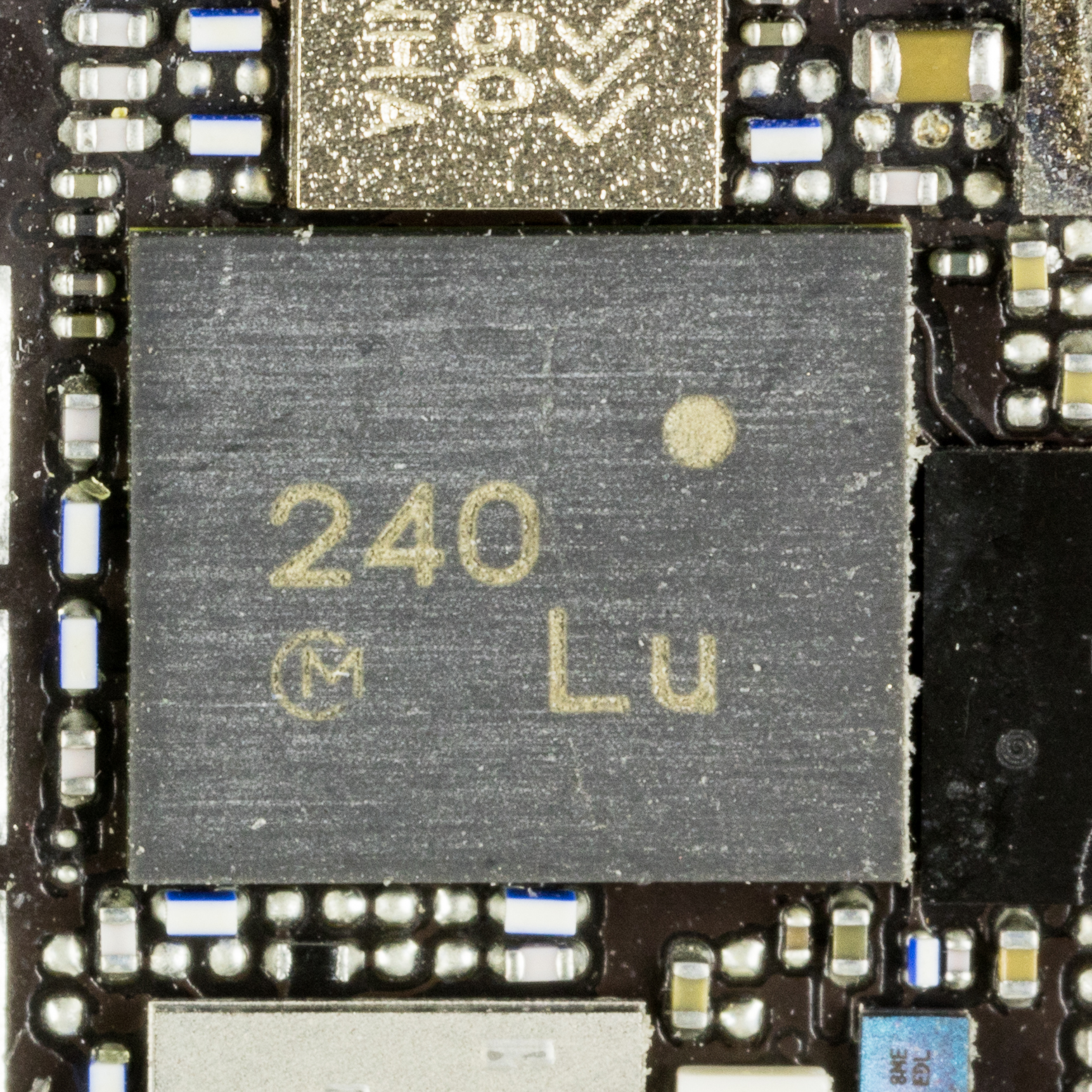
Murata-circuit in an IPhone 6s

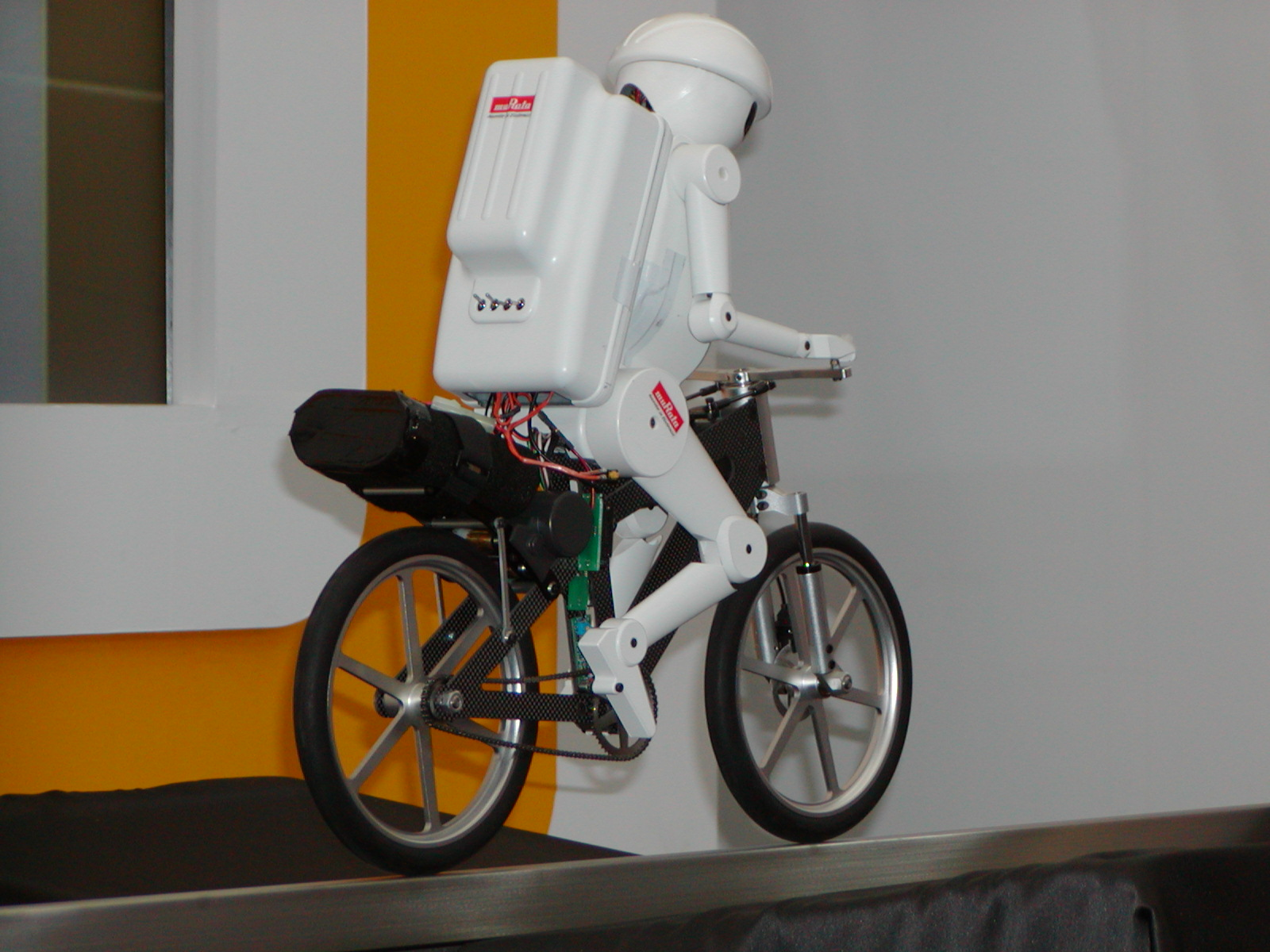
Murata Boy, a 50 cm (20") high bicycle-riding robot developed by the company since 1991 (2005 Model pictured).

== See also ==
- Murata Machinery, an industrial machines manufacturer that is often confused with Murata Manufacturing
