= List of museums in the Philippines =

This is a list of museums in the Philippines.

== Luzon ==
Museum Name	Image	Location	Description
Aguinaldo Shrine		Kawit, Cavite	Site of the Declaration of Philippine Independence of 1898
Baliwag Museum and Library		Baliwag, Bulacan	
Capas National Shrine		Capas, Tarlac	World War II memorial and museum
Casa Santa Museum		Antipolo, Rizal	
Expo Pilipino		Angeles City	Open-air museum built for the 1998 Philippine Centennial Exposition
Las Casas Filipinas de Acuzar		Bagac, Bataan	Open-air museum of Filipino cultural history
Clark Museum and 4D Theater		Clark Freeport Zone, Pampanga	Modern museum with 4D Theater highlighting history of Clark from 1902 to present. Highlights Filipino resiliency after the eruption of Mt. Pinatubo in 1991 through 4D technology.
Gen. Paciano Rizal Shrine			
Marcelo H. Del Pilar National Shrine		Bulakan, Bulacan	Birthplace of Marcelo H. del Pilar
Ferdinand E. Marcos Presidential Center		Batac, Ilocos Norte	
Mount Samat National Shrine		Pilar, Bataan	World War II memorial and museum
Museo de Iloko		Agoo, La Union	Former presidencia (municipal building) of Agoo converted into a museum in 1981, containing locally excavated Ming Dynasty pottery, antique spanish dolls, and some personal effects of former president Elpidio Quirino.
Museo ni Ramon Magsaysay		Castillejos, Zambales	Birthplace of former President Ramon Magsaysay
Museum of Philippine Political History		Casa Real Shrine, Building, Paseo del Congreso, Malolos	Museum showcasing the history of Philippine politics
Museum of the Women of Malolos		Malolos, Bulacan	20th-century bahay-na-bato. Formerly the residence of Alberta Uitangcoy-Santos and currently a museum for The Women of Malolos. Curated by Carlo Herrera.
Rizal Shrine		Calamba, Laguna	Birthplace of José Rizal
Villa Escudero Museum		San Pablo, Laguna	
MindSpark		Ayala Malls Manila Bay, Parañaque	The largest interactive science museum in the Philippines with over 100 exhibits and 30 themed rooms designed to promote STEM learning among students.

== Visayas ==
Museum Name	Image	Location	Description
Agatona Museum		Iloilo City, Iloilo	
Balay Negrense		Silay, Negros Occidental	
Bernardino Jalandoni Museum		Silay, Negros Occidental	
Bohol National Museum		Tagbilaran, Bohol	
Camiña Balay Nga Bato		Iloilo City, Iloilo	
Casa Gorordo Museum		Cebu City, Cebu	
Casa Mariquit		Iloilo City, Iloilo	
Cathedral Museum of Cebu		Cebu City, Cebu	
Dizon-Ramos Museum		Bacolod, Negros Occidental	
Fort San Pedro		Cebu City, Cebu	
Jose R. Gullas Halad Museum		Cebu City, Cebu	
Jumalon Museum, Butterfly Sanctuary and Art Gallery		Cebu City, Cebu	
Magdalena Jalandoni Museum and Historical Shrine		Iloilo City, Iloilo	
Museo Iloilo		Iloilo City, Iloilo	
Museo Sugbo		Cebu City, Cebu	
Museo negrense de la salle		Bacolod, Negros Occidental	
Museum of Philippine Economic History		Iloilo City, Iloilo	
Museum of Philippine Maritime History		Iloilo City, Iloilo	
National Museum - Central Visayas		Cebu City, Cebu	
National Museum - Western Visayas		Iloilo City, Iloilo	
Negros Museum		Bacolod, Negros Occidental	
President Manuel A. Roxas Ancestral House		Roxas, Capiz	
Rosendo Mejica Museum		Iloilo City, Iloilo	
UPV Museum of Art and Cultural Heritage		Iloilo City, Iloilo	
University of San Agustin Archives and Museum		Iloilo City, Iloilo	
University of San Carlos Museum		Cebu City, Cebu	

== Mindanao ==
Museum Name	Image	Location	Description
Rizal Shrine		Dapitan, Zamboanga del Norte	

== See also ==
- List of museums
- Tourism in the Philippines
- Arts of the Philippines
- Culture of the Philippines
