= Casa Santa =

Casa Santa may refer to:

- Casa Santa, a modern lower district of the historic hilltop town of Erice, Italy
- Casa Santa Museum, public attraction of Jardin de Miramar, located in Antipolo City, east of Metro Manila

== See also ==
- Basilica della Santa Casa
