= Cathedral Museum of Cebu =

Catholic museum in Cebu City, Philippines

Coordinates: 10°17′45.83″N 123°54′12.38″E

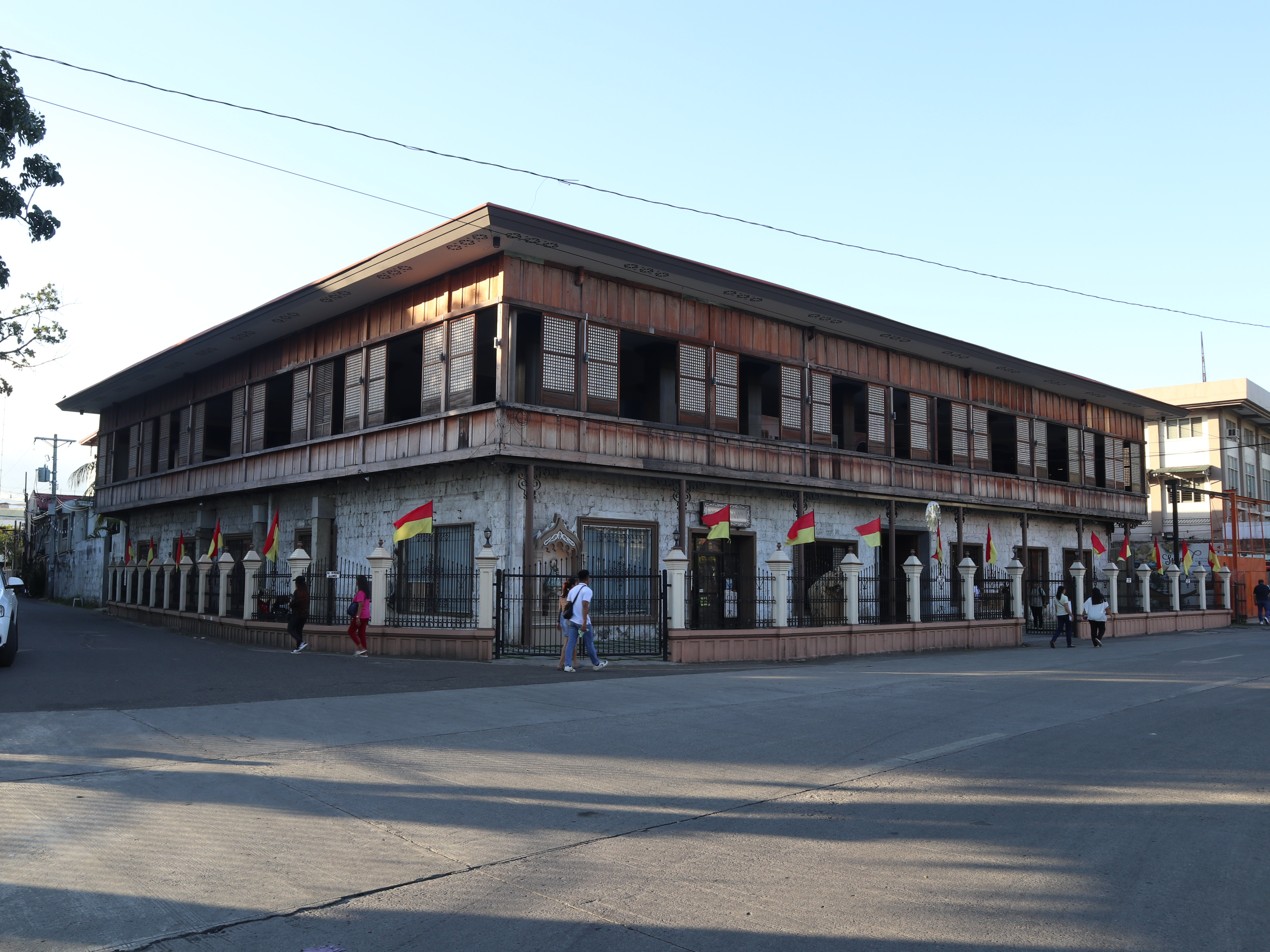
Façade of the Cathedral Museum of Cebu, originally the cathedral convento or parish house.

The Archdiocesan Museum of Cebu, also known as the Cathedral Museum of Cebu, is a museum in Downtown Cebu City in the Philippines, reopened in November 2006. It is the ecclesiastical museum of the Roman Catholic Archdiocese of Cebu.

The focus of the museum is regional Church architecture and artifacts. Many of the items on display are from the Spanish colonial times.

== Museum site and building history ==
It is situated next to the Cebu Metropolitan Cathedral, and not far from the Basilica Minore del Santo Niño. The collection was in the priest houses. is housed in a building which is in itself a museum piece; it goes back to the 19th century. The building was one of the few extant structures in downtown Cebu City that was totally spared from the ravages of World War II. It also survived uninformed renovators and the natural elements.

It was built in the early nineteenth hundred century probably during the incumbency of Cebu Bishop Santos Gomez Marañon. Bishop Marañon, who was known as a church builder, was responsible for the construction of the churches of Oslob, Cebu and Naga, the Episcopal Palace across the cathedral, the bell tower of Argao and the convent of Sibonga.

It was first the parish convent of the Cathedral, then a school of the University of San Carlos, then a cooperative store, and even as a temporary chapel during the renovation of the Cathedral.

== Exhibitions and galleries ==
In the museum there is a chapel, which has become an exhibition area for "the Carmen collection" (from the parish of Carmen, Cebu) which consists of a tabernacle, gradas and altar panels made of wood encased in etched silver. The memorial chapel is also frequently used for special exhibitions,

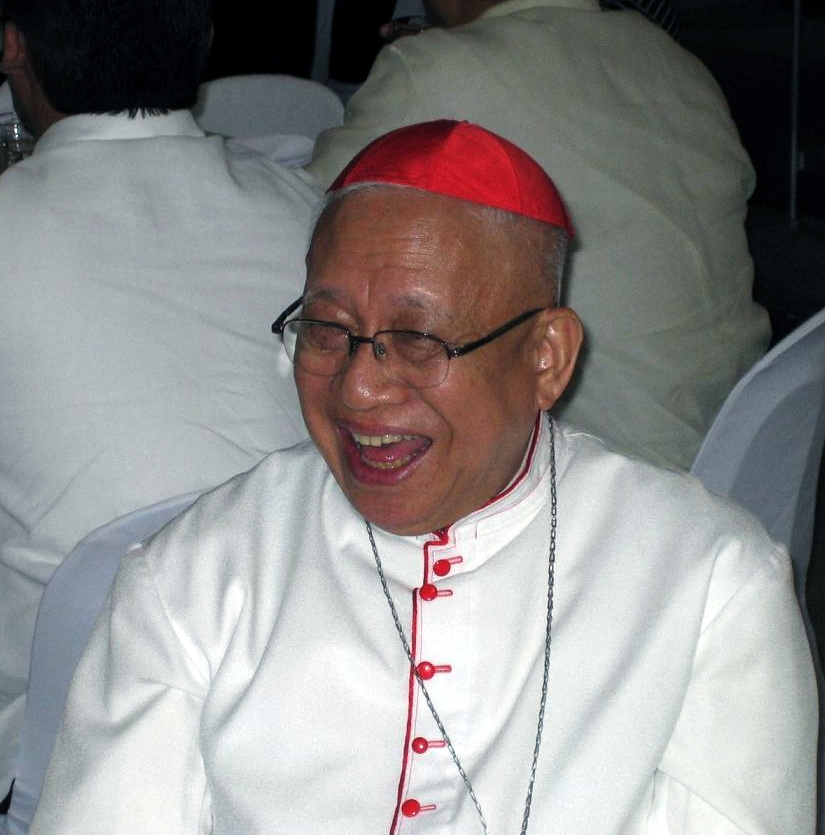
Cardinal Ricardo J. Vidal.

Up a wide staircase to the upper floors are several galleries. The first is a gallery of photographs and illustrations depicting the growth of the Catholic faith in the island. The second gallery contains the memorabilia of Cardinal Ricardo Vidal, who, when first assigned in Cebu, was a resident of this convento as the parish priest of the cathedral. Among his memorabilia are prayer books, notebooks and a sample ballot used in the election of a pope, as well as a cardinal’s ring given to him by his predecessor, Cardinal Julio Rosales, and the vestments he used during his Episcopal ordination, his elevation to the cardinalate.

Gallery three shows how churches were constructed in the Spanish era and shows photographs as well as actual building materials used. The fourth gallery is a gathering of Saints, exhibiting a collection of statues of saints from various parishes, including one of St. Joseph at his deathbed. The fifth gallery is a display of chalices and ciboriums, of priestly vestments and other accoutrements of the liturgy of the Mass and the sacraments of the Roman Catholic Church. The sixth gallery is a sample bedroom of a priest.

== Planned additions ==
Still to be developed (2008) is the patio fronting the lobby, which will house a coffee shop and museum shop. Beyond this there will be a garden.

== Leadership ==
The museum is under the direction of the Archdiocesan Commission for the Cultural Heritage of the Church, chaired by Msgr. Carlito V. Pono. The head curator is Brian Brigoli, assisted by Louella Eslao and Mary Frances Villacastin-Despi.

A considerably smaller ecclesial museum was opened at the same site in 1995, and was only a one-room affair at the ground floor of the present museum. It stopped operating upon the death of the curator, Virgilio R. Yap. The preparation and refurbishing of the entire convent building was started in 2000.
