= Jumalon Museum, Butterfly Sanctuary and Art Gallery =

Local private museum, nature, and art gallery in Jumalon, Cebu

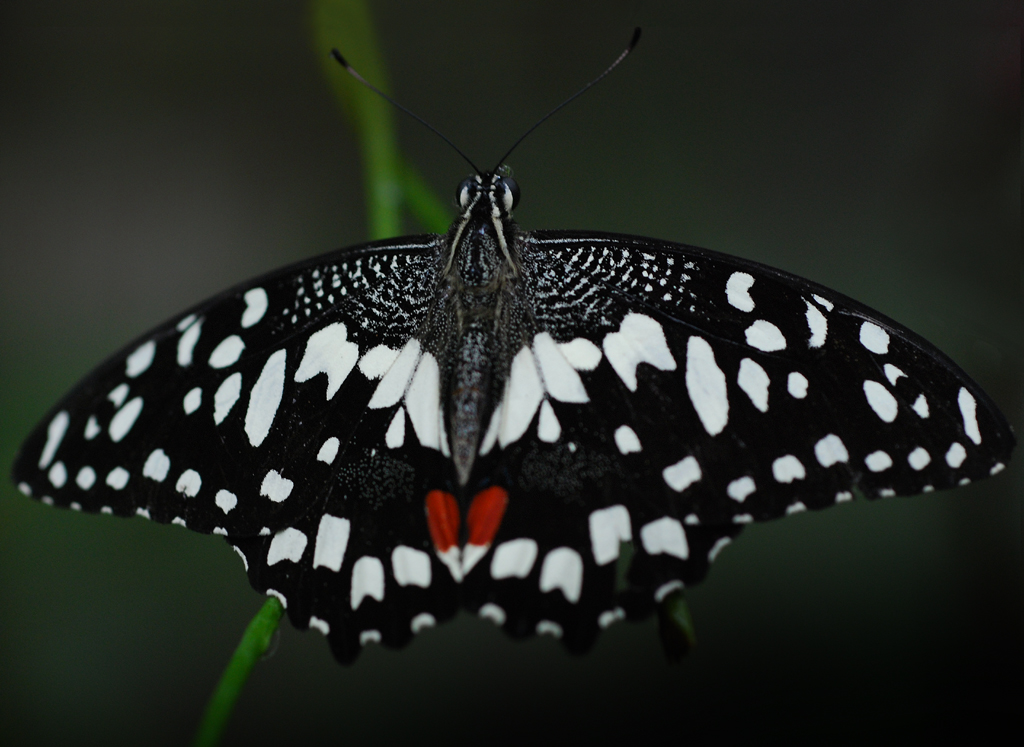
Papilio demoleus in the Butterfly Sanctuary

Jumalon Museum, Butterfly Sanctuary and Art Gallery is a private museum, art gallery and nature reserve run by the Jumalon Foundation. It is located in Julian N. Jumalon St. (former Macopa St.) Basak, Pardo, Cebu City, Philippines.

== History ==
Built in 1974, it originally served as a residence of the late Cebuano lepidopterist Julian Navarro Jumalon (October 18, 1909 - June 26, 2000).

Prof. Jumalon amassed a vast collection of butterflies through his travels worldwide and by trading local Philippine species with foreign ones. To study Lepidopterans, he planted his residence with butterfly food plants. He also caught live specimens and released them in his garden. His butterfly collection is the oldest and perhaps the biggest in the Philippines.

After his death, a foundation (Julian N. Jumalon Foundation, Inc.) was created by his children and grand children to foster to his collection and the compound which, prior to the founder's death, became a tourist attraction.

== Attractions ==
Inside the compound are a salon and garden. The garden is a collection of a hundred butterfly food plant species. Among these plants are 50 local and foreign species of butterflies. Some rare species are hatched in captivity and later released.

Inside the salon is Jumalon's collection of butterflies and other insects, and the histories of butterfly species. The salon houses the paintings and other works of Jumalon, who was also an artist. Most popular among his works are his mosaics made entirely of butterfly wings (lepido mosaic) from damaged butterflies taken from his collection and other collections around the world. These mosaics depicts several places around Cebu City and national heroes, among others.
