= Casa Mariquit =

Historic house in Iloilo City, Philippines

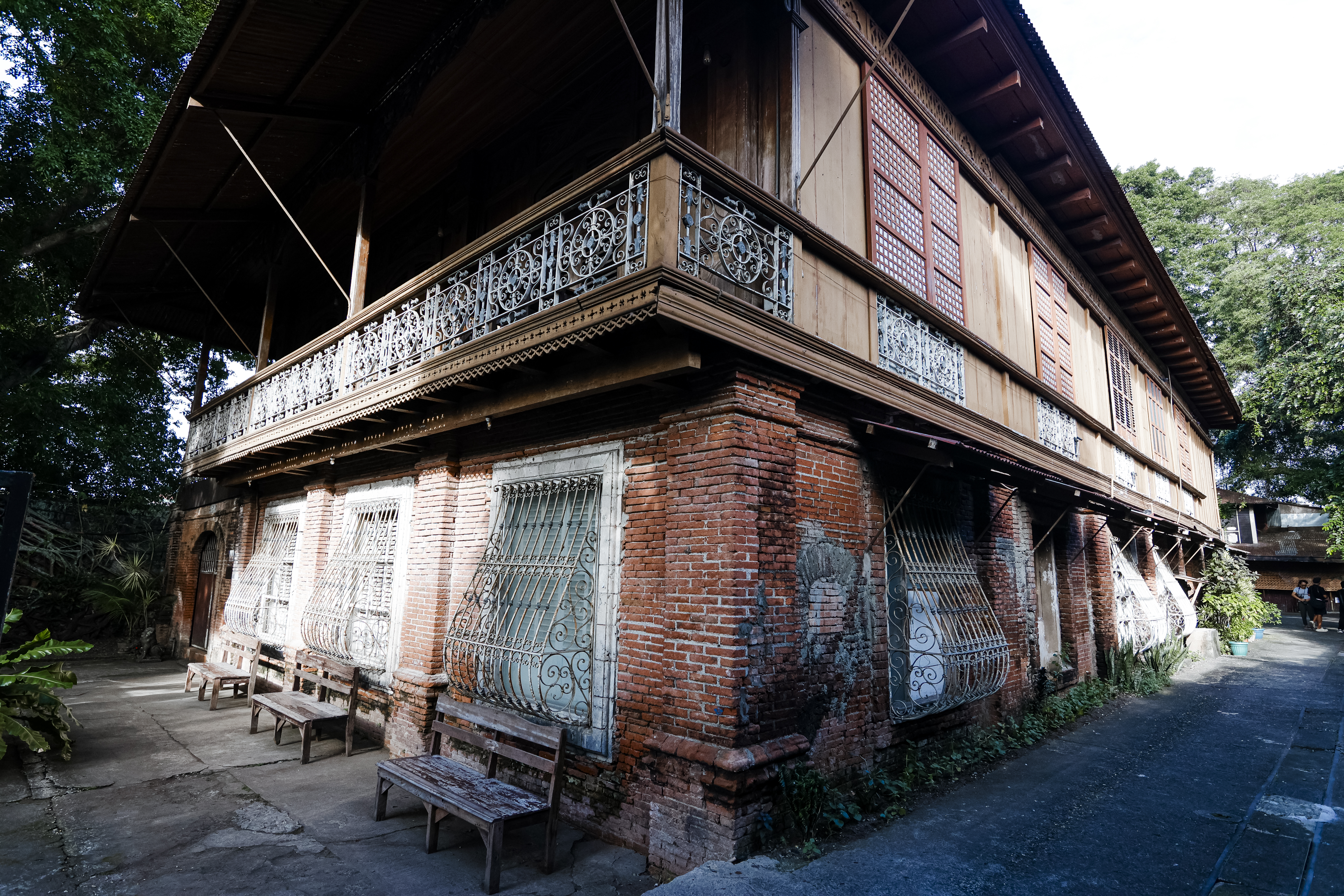

General information
- Location: Santa Isabel St., Jaro, Iloilo City, Philippines
- Coordinates: 10°43′37″N 122°33′24″E
- Completed: 1803

Casa Mariquit, sometimes known as Javellana–Lopez Heritage House, is a historic house in Iloilo City, Philippines. The house is located on Santa Isabel Street in the district of Jaro. It is considered the oldest existing heritage house in Iloilo, built in 1803.

The centuries-old house is owned by one of the most influential old families in Iloilo, Javellana and Lopez kins. It is also one of the most well-maintained heritage houses in Iloilo. It still contains much of its original furniture and old framed photographs hanging on the walls.

It is now a museum open to the public for tours.

== History ==
Casa Mariquit was built in 1803 as both a bank and a residence by a banker, Ramon Javellana. It eventually became a home for his granddaughter, Maria Salvacion Javellana, whose nickname is Mariquit, which means "beautiful" in Filipino, and his husband, Fernando Lopez, Sr., who served as the Vice President of the Philippines from 1949 to 1953 under President Elpidio Quirino and from 1965 to 1972 under President Ferdinand Marcos.

In February 1981, Pope John Paul II visited and blessed the house himself during his visit to Iloilo.

In 1993, after the former Vice President died, his great-grandson, Robert Lopez Puckett Jr., who is also one of Solaready Inc.'s founders, commenced the restoration of the house. The Casa Mariquit is still under his care.

== Gallery ==
Exterior

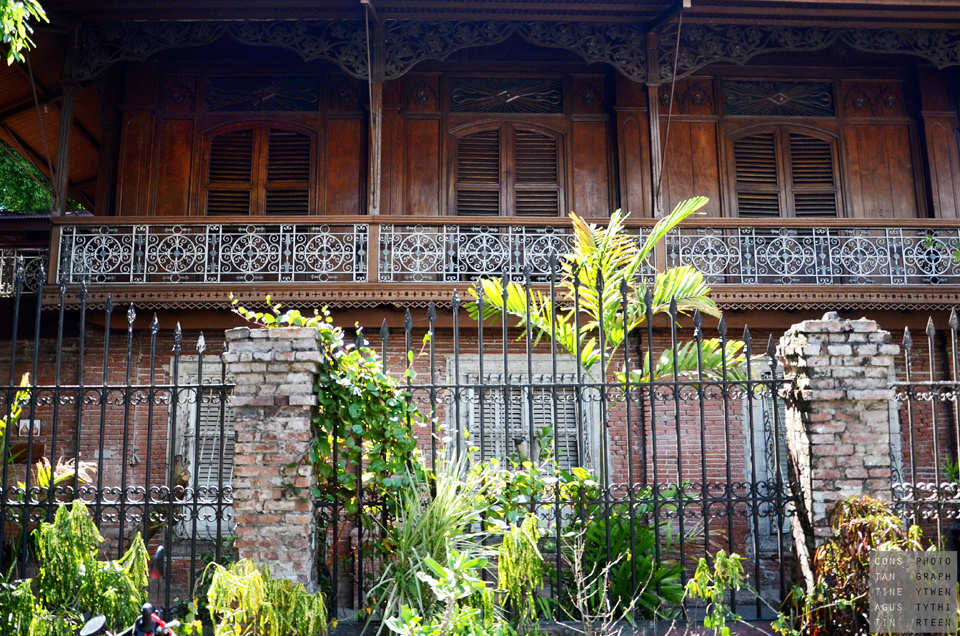

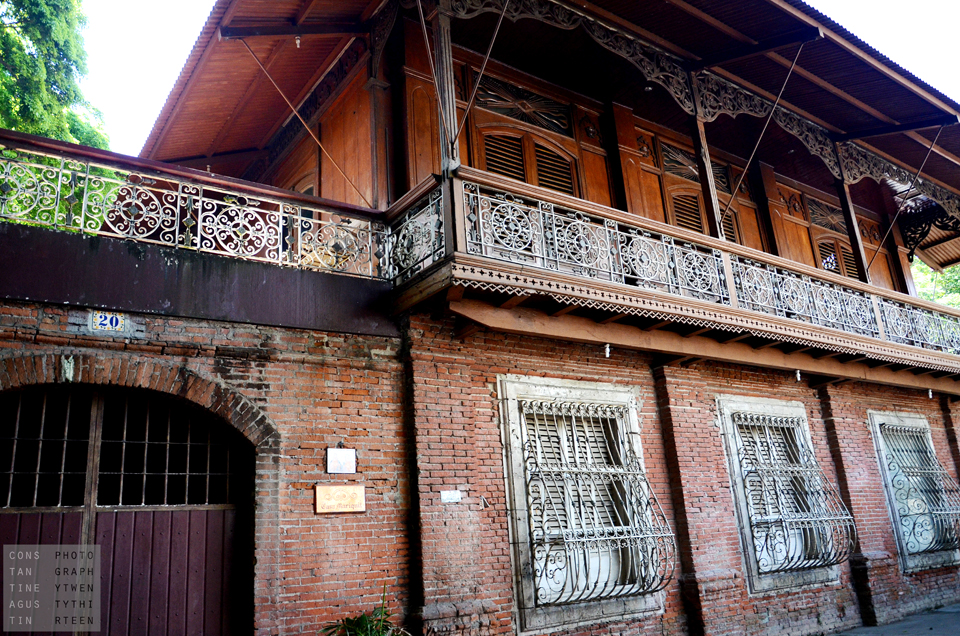

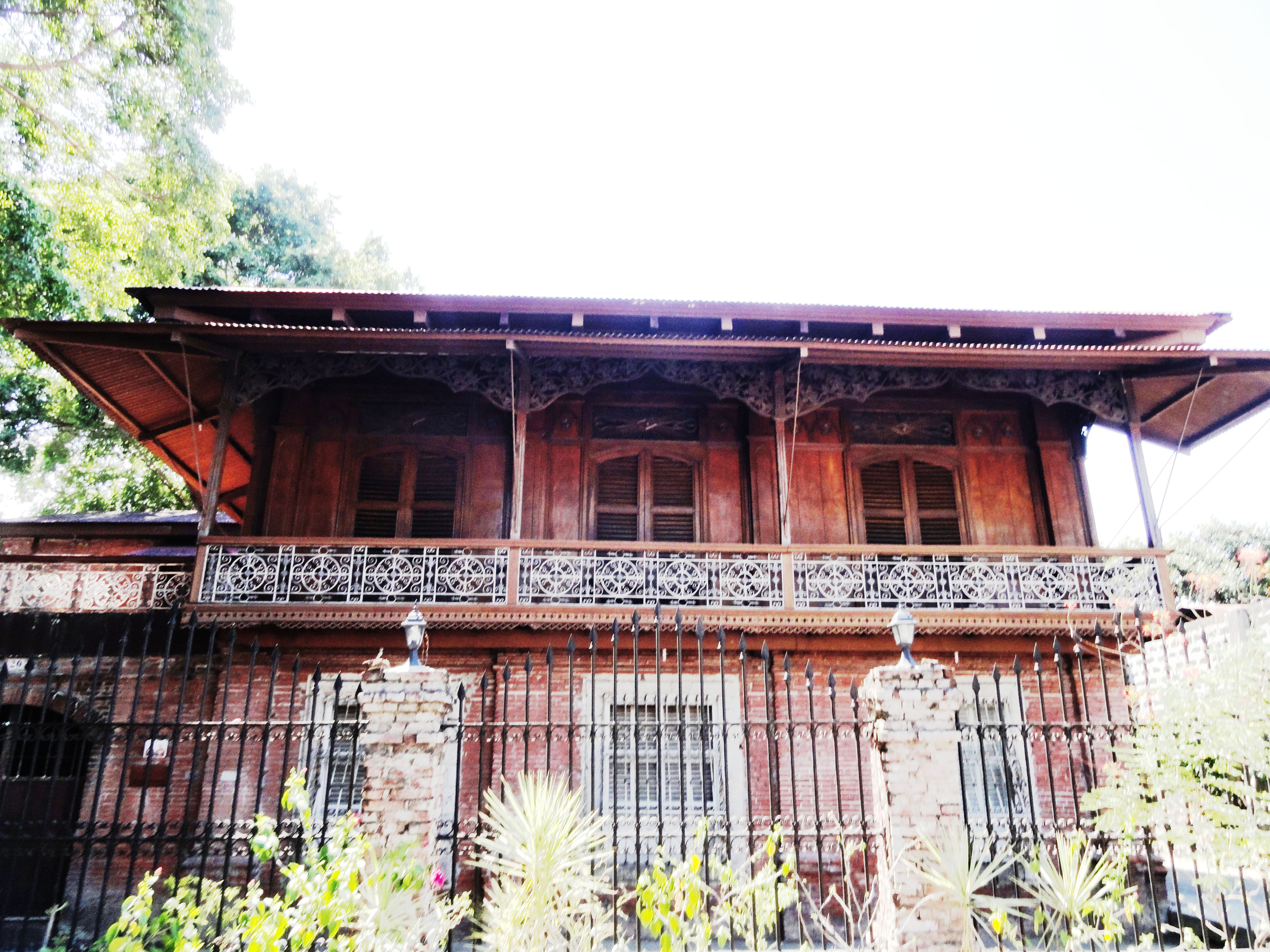

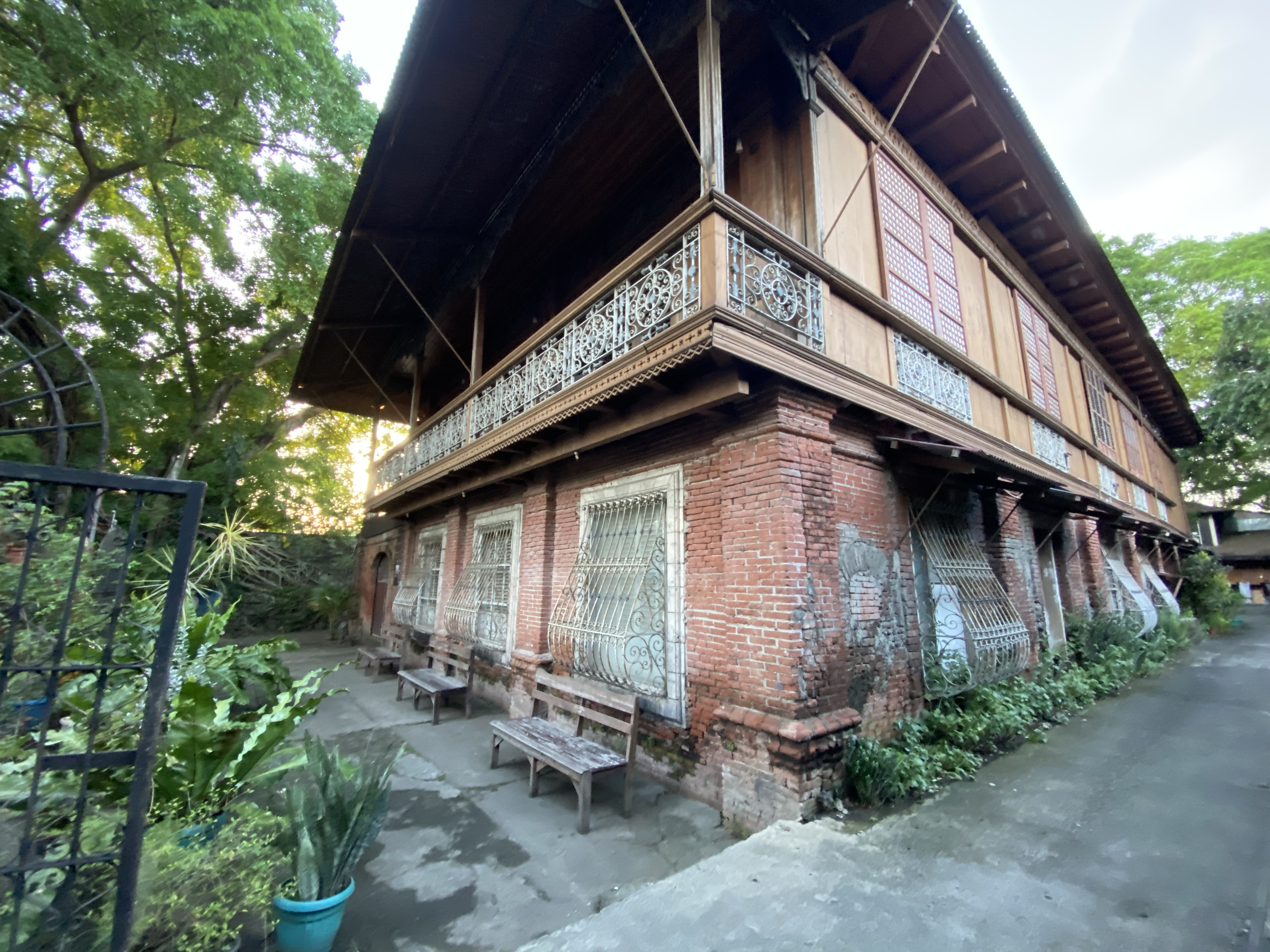
Interior

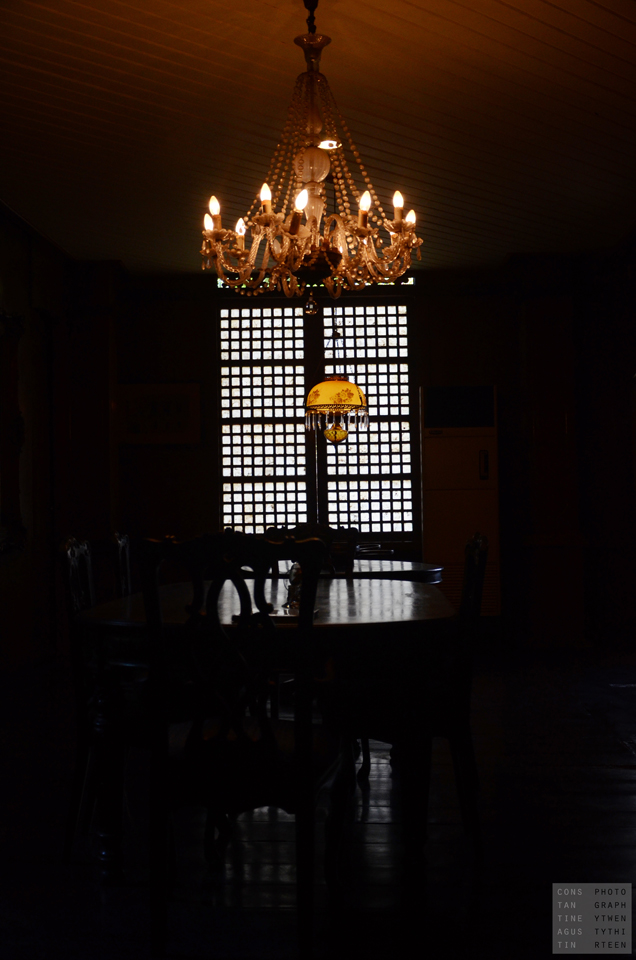

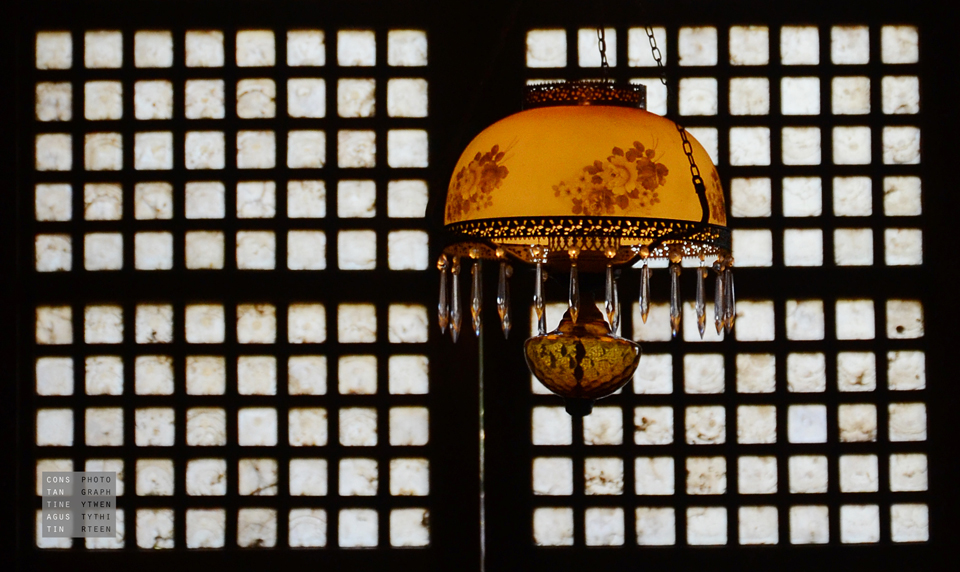

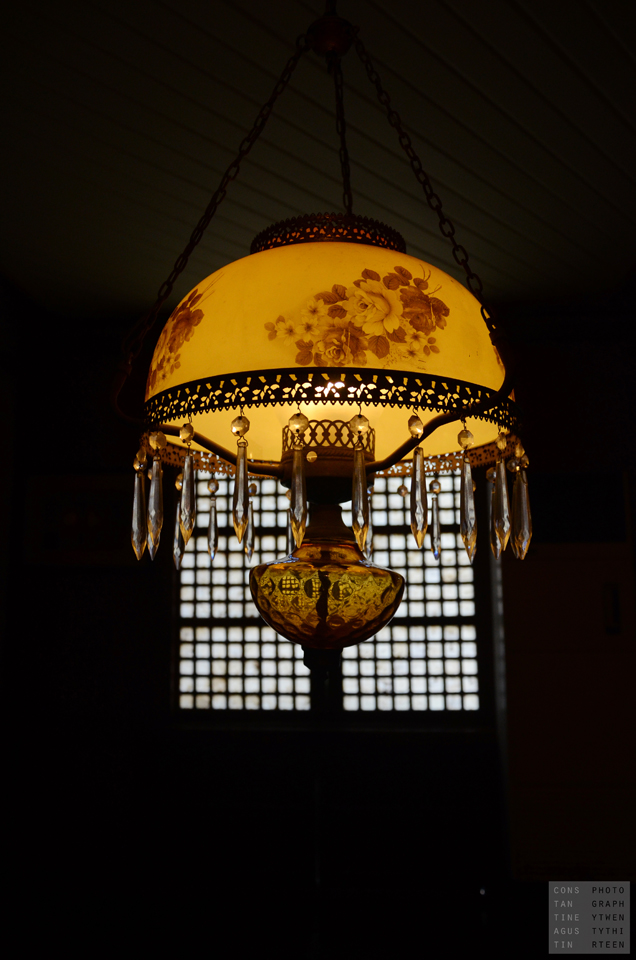

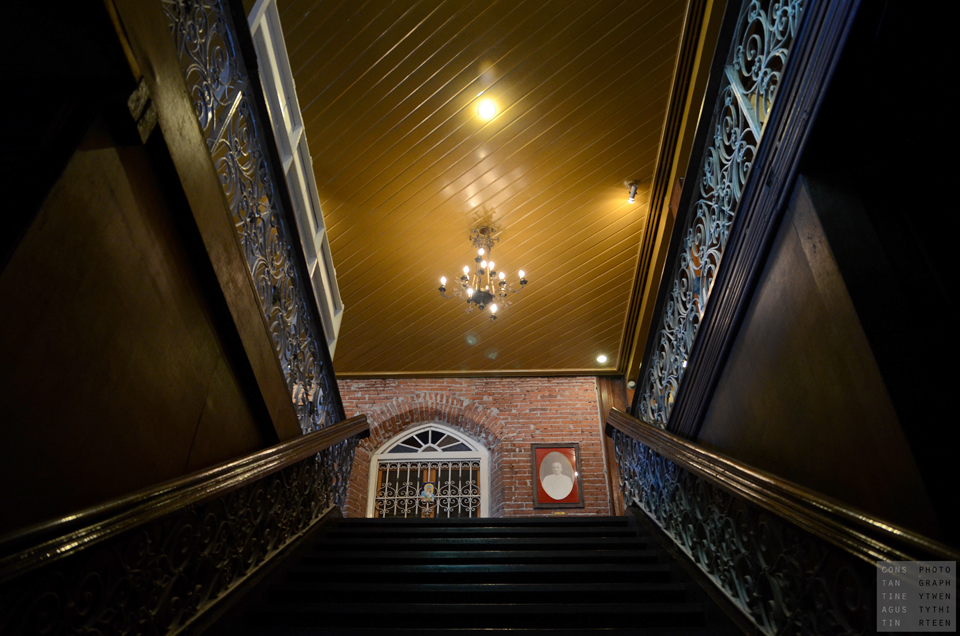

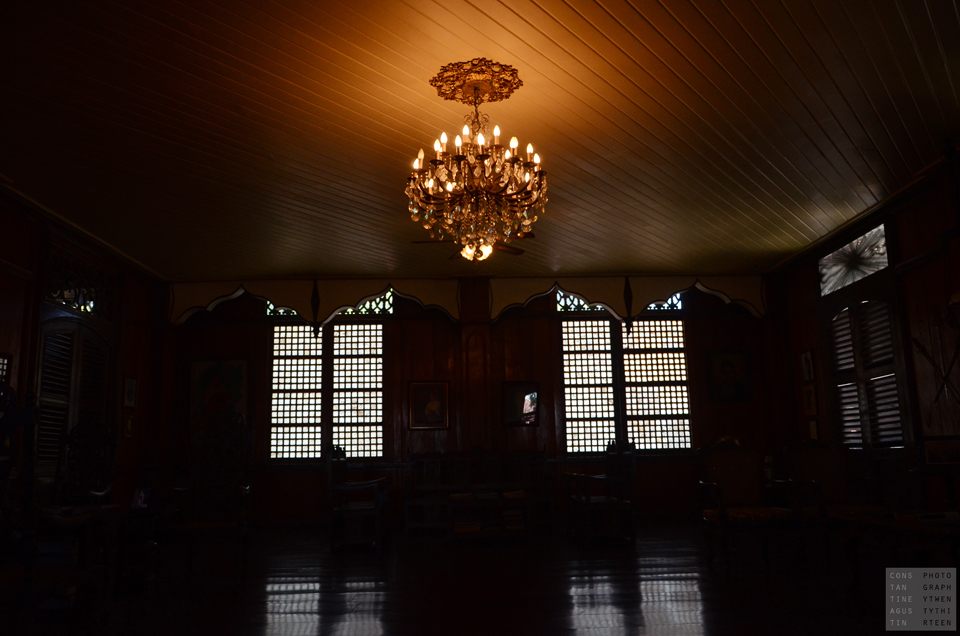

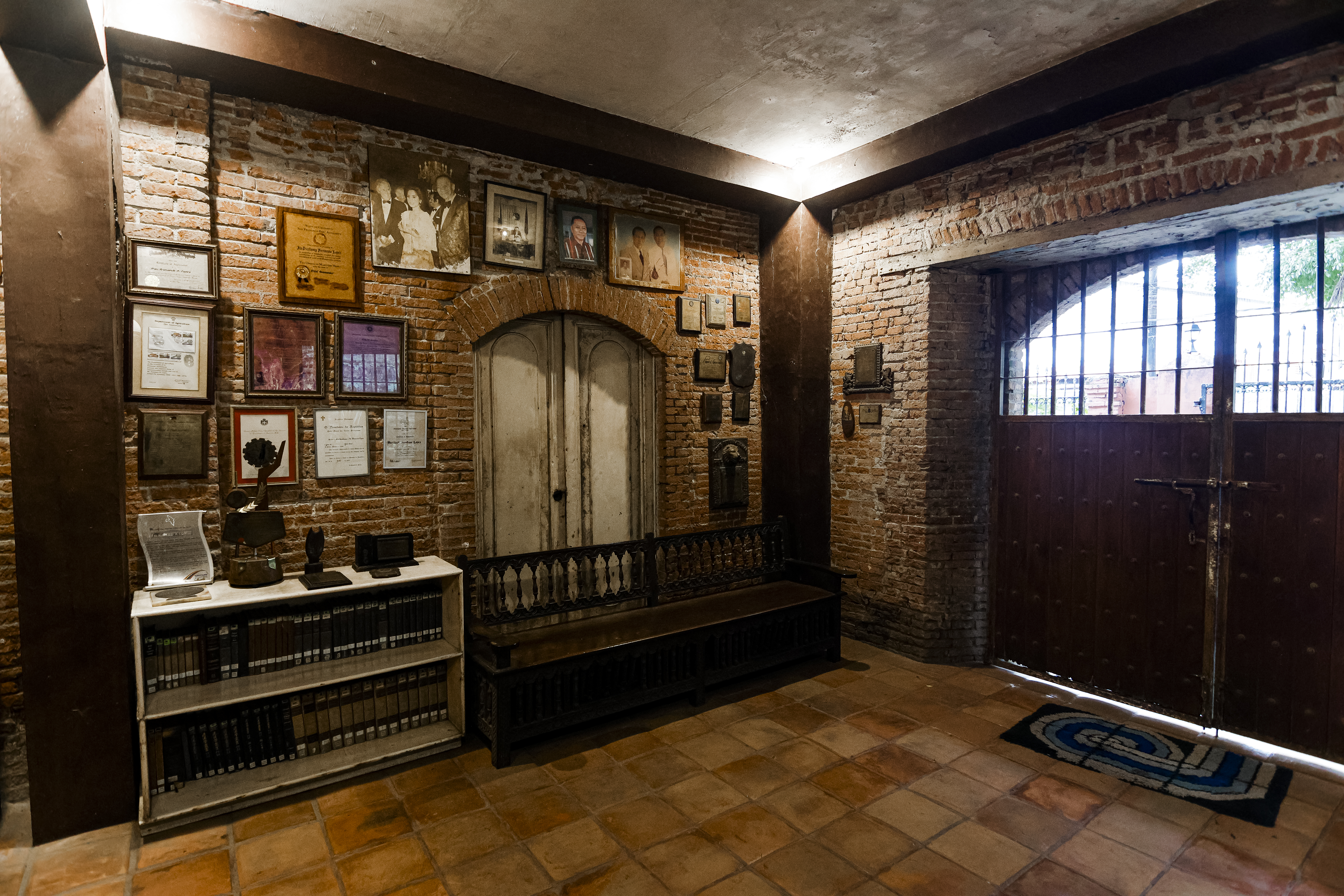

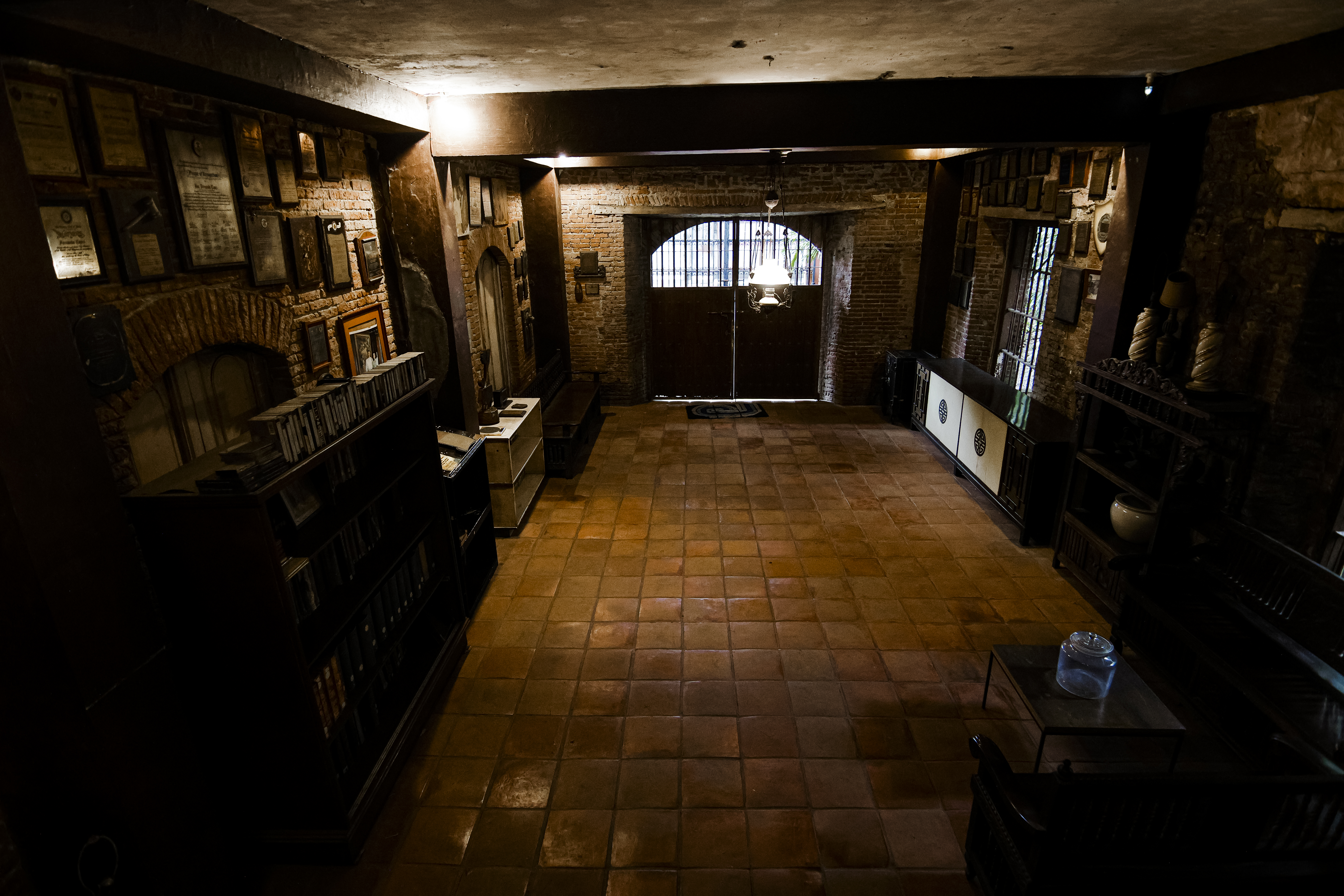

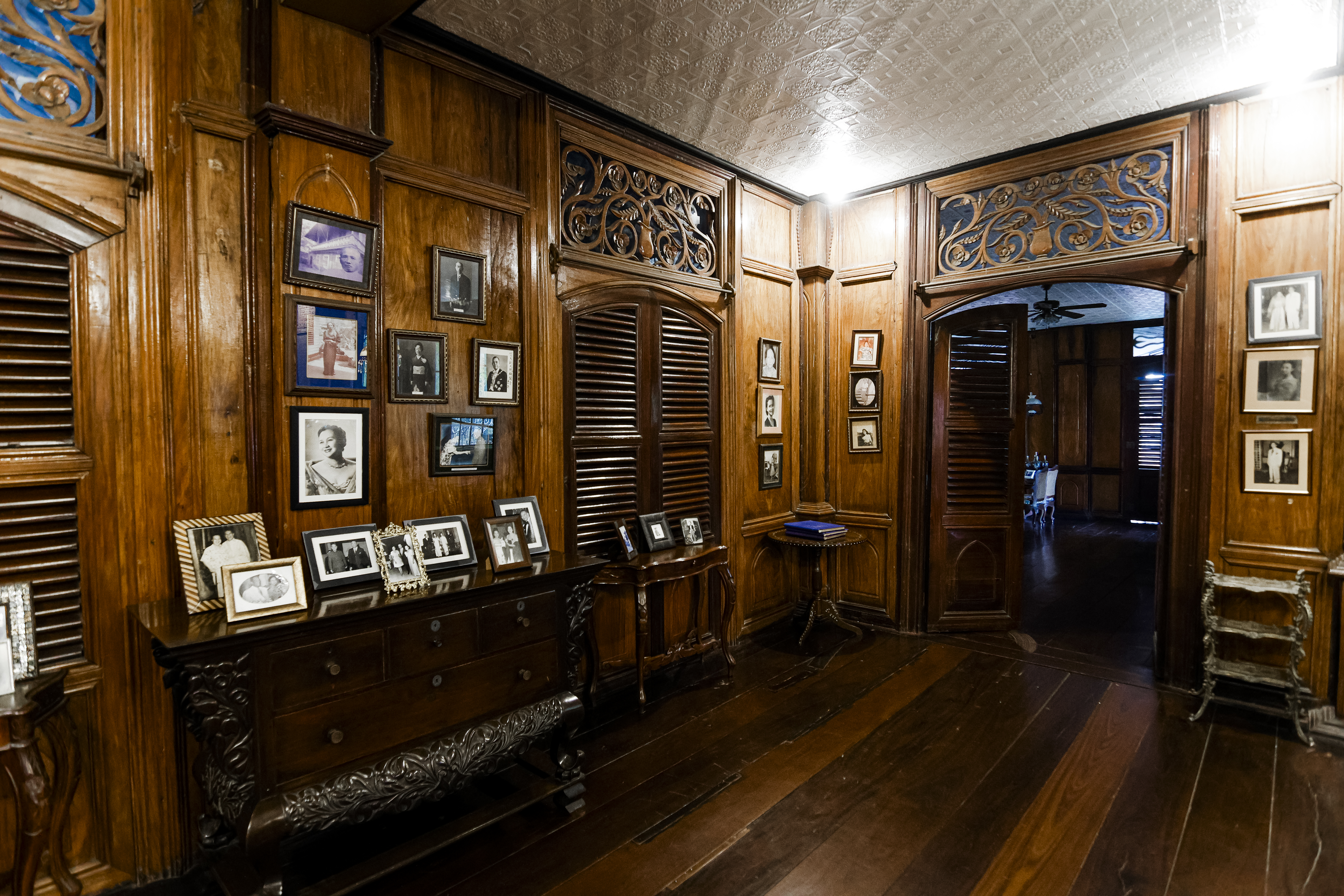

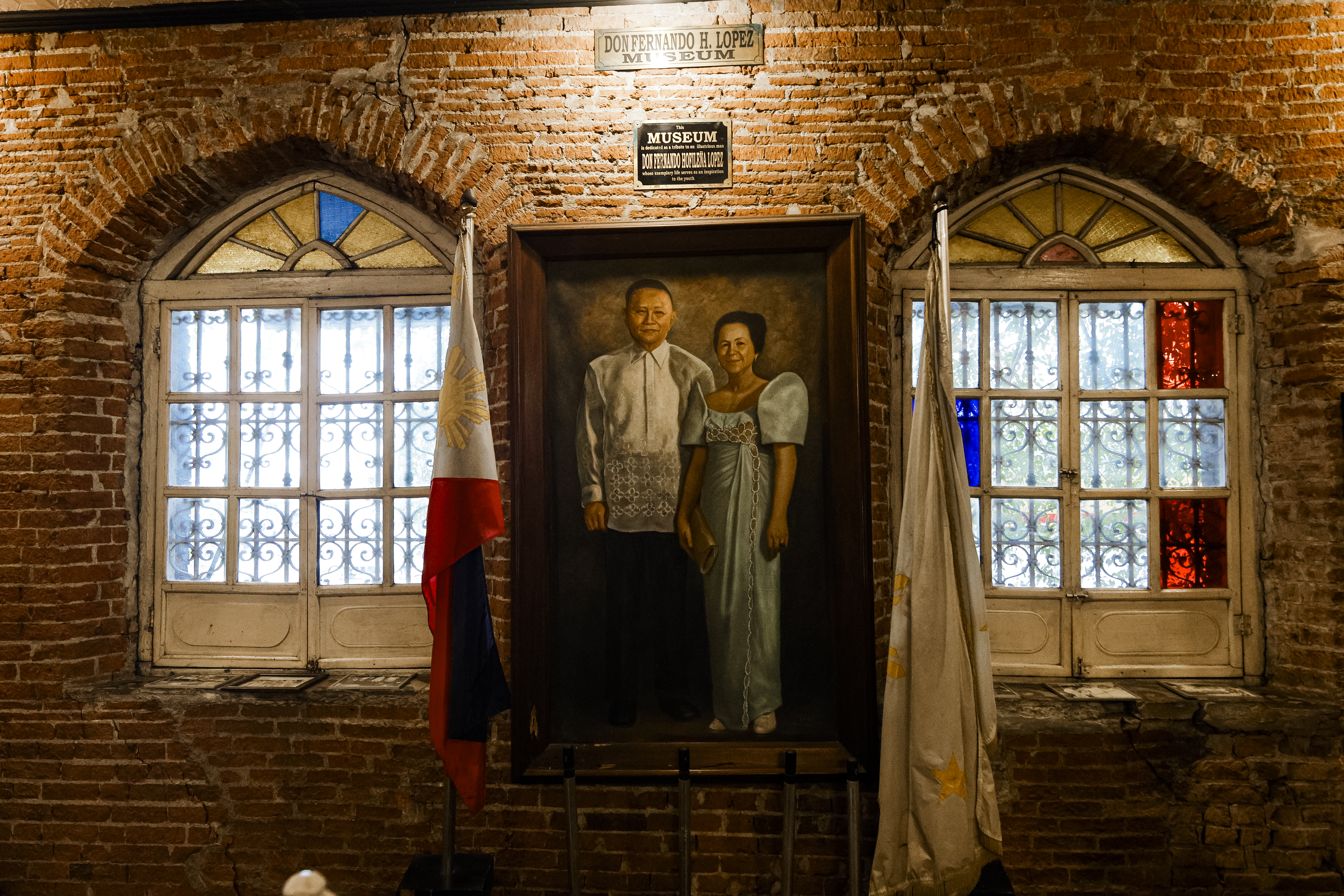

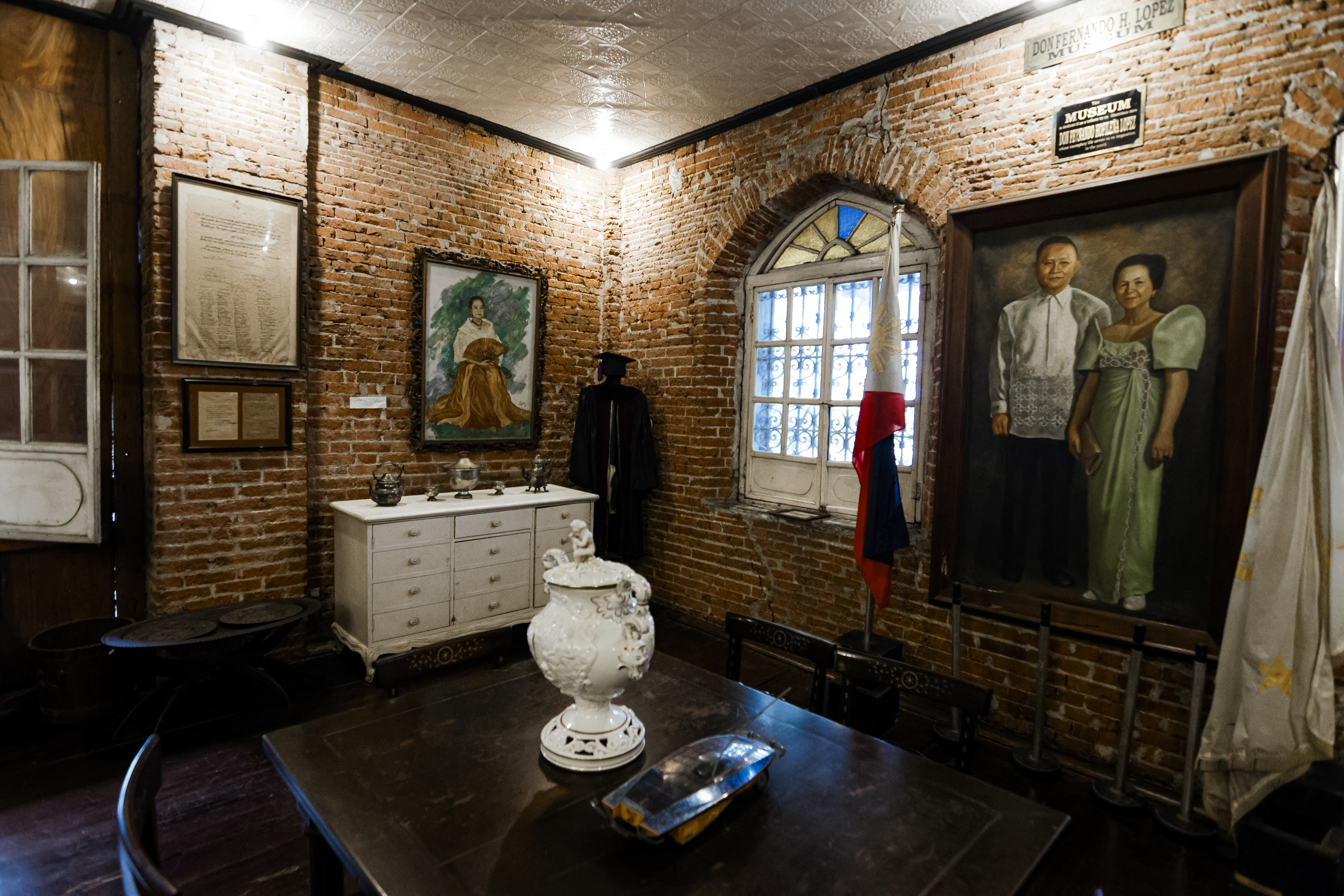

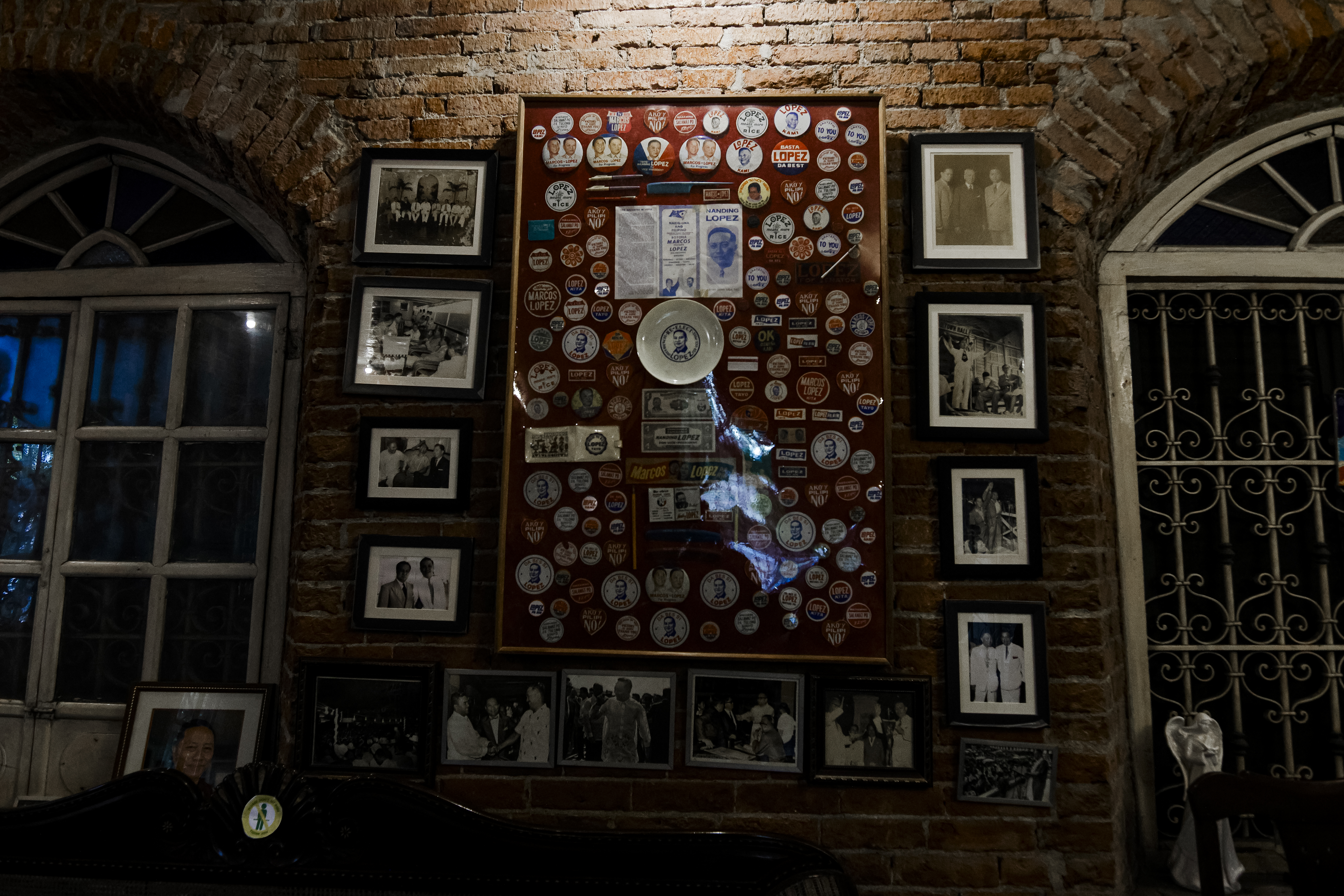

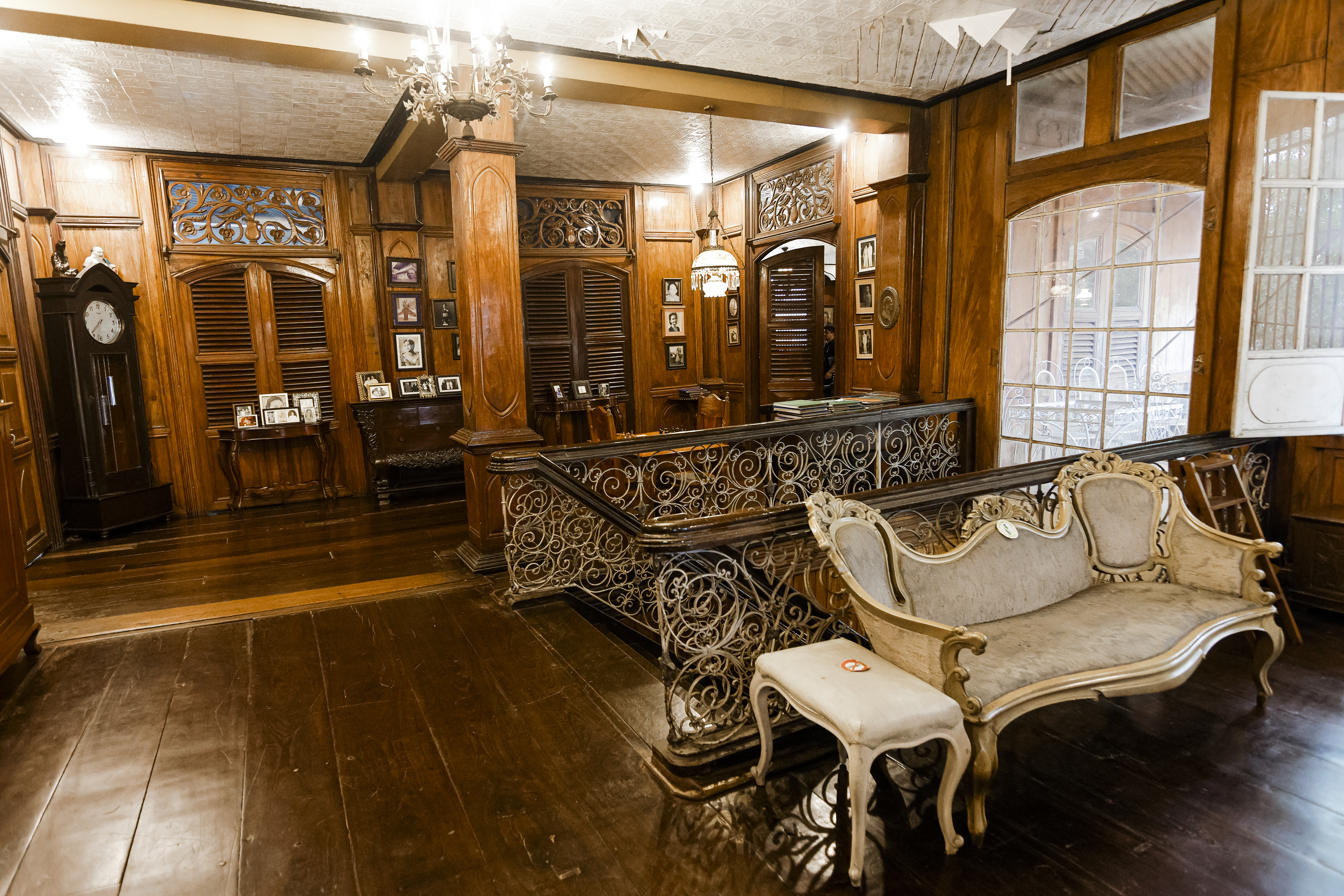

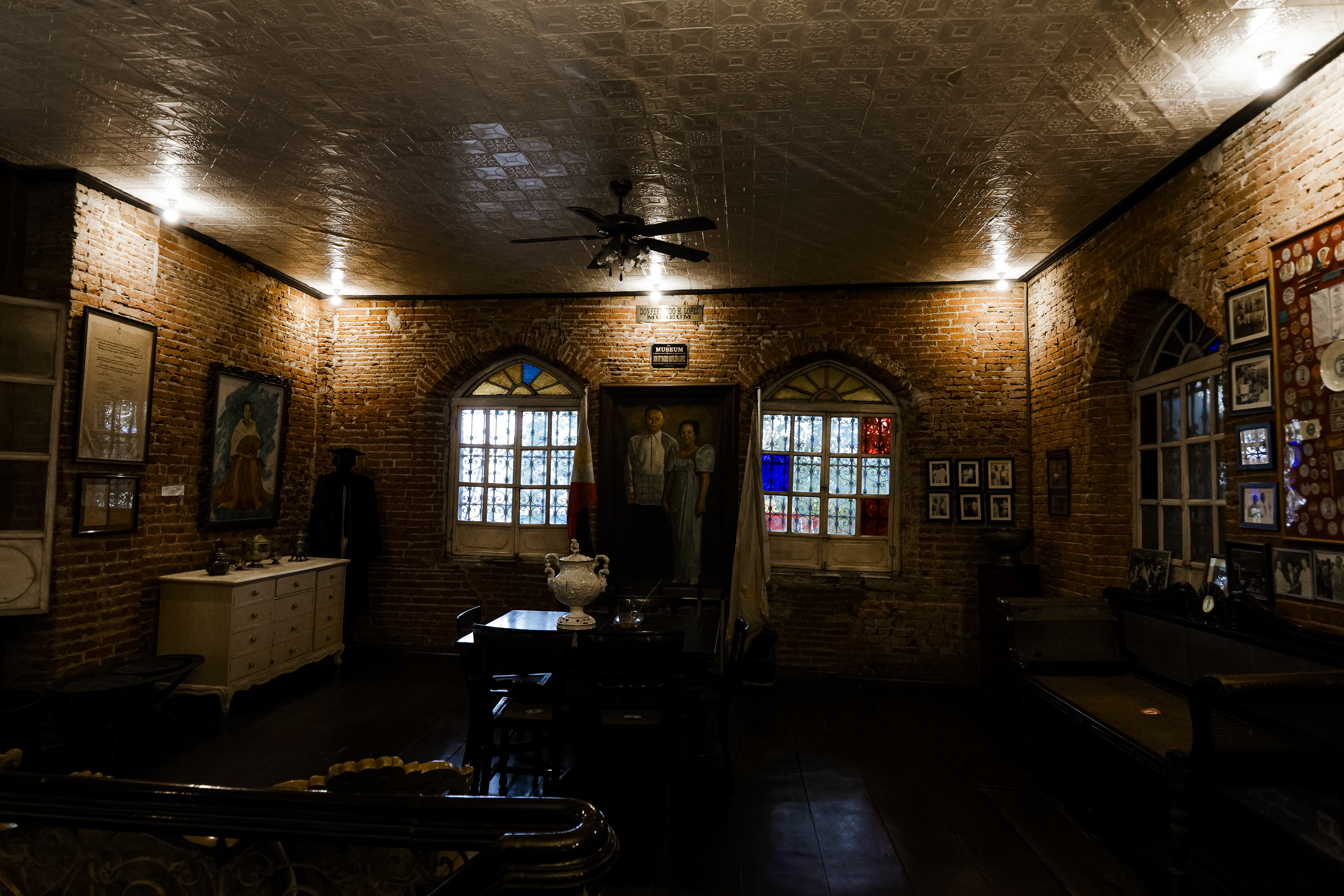

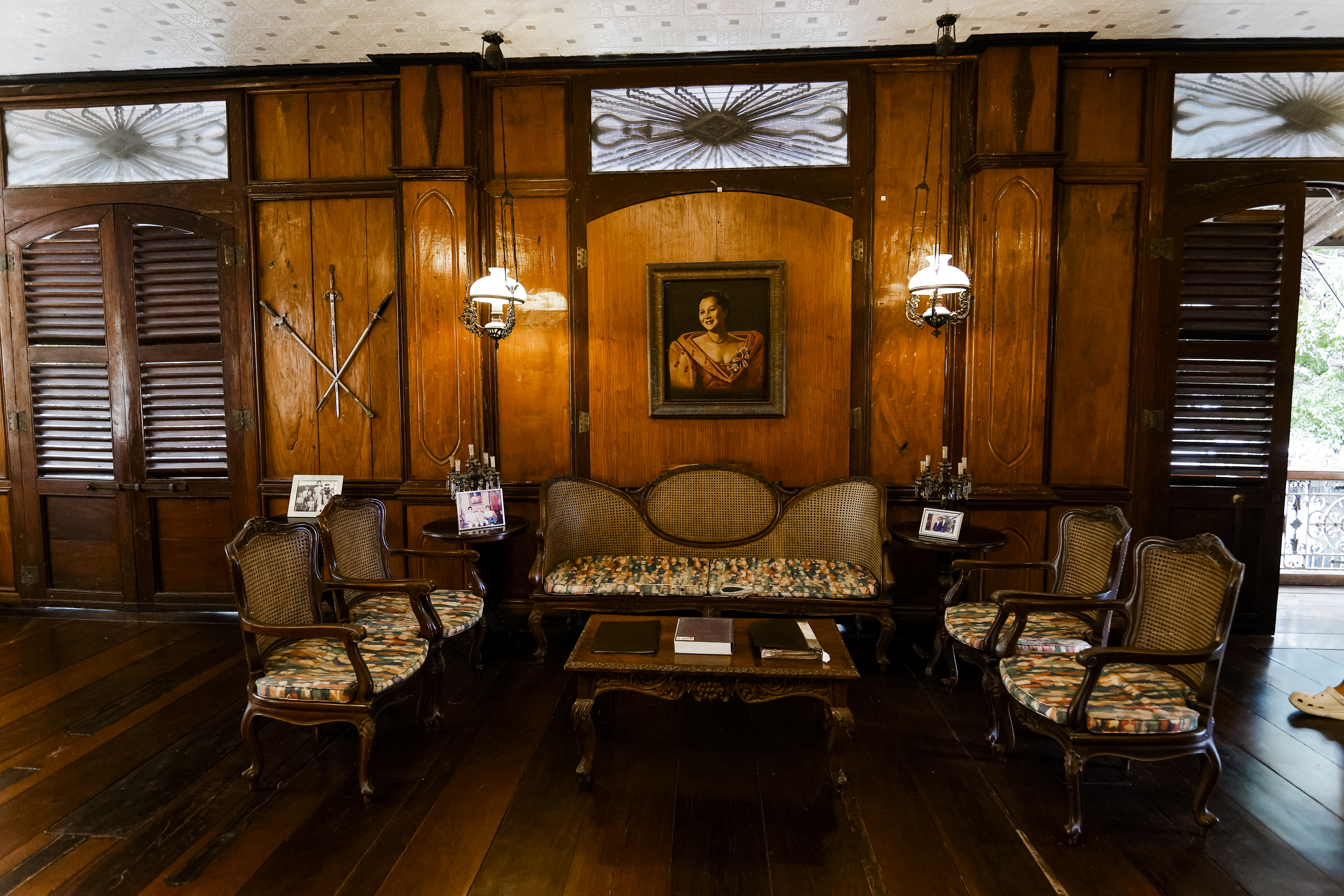

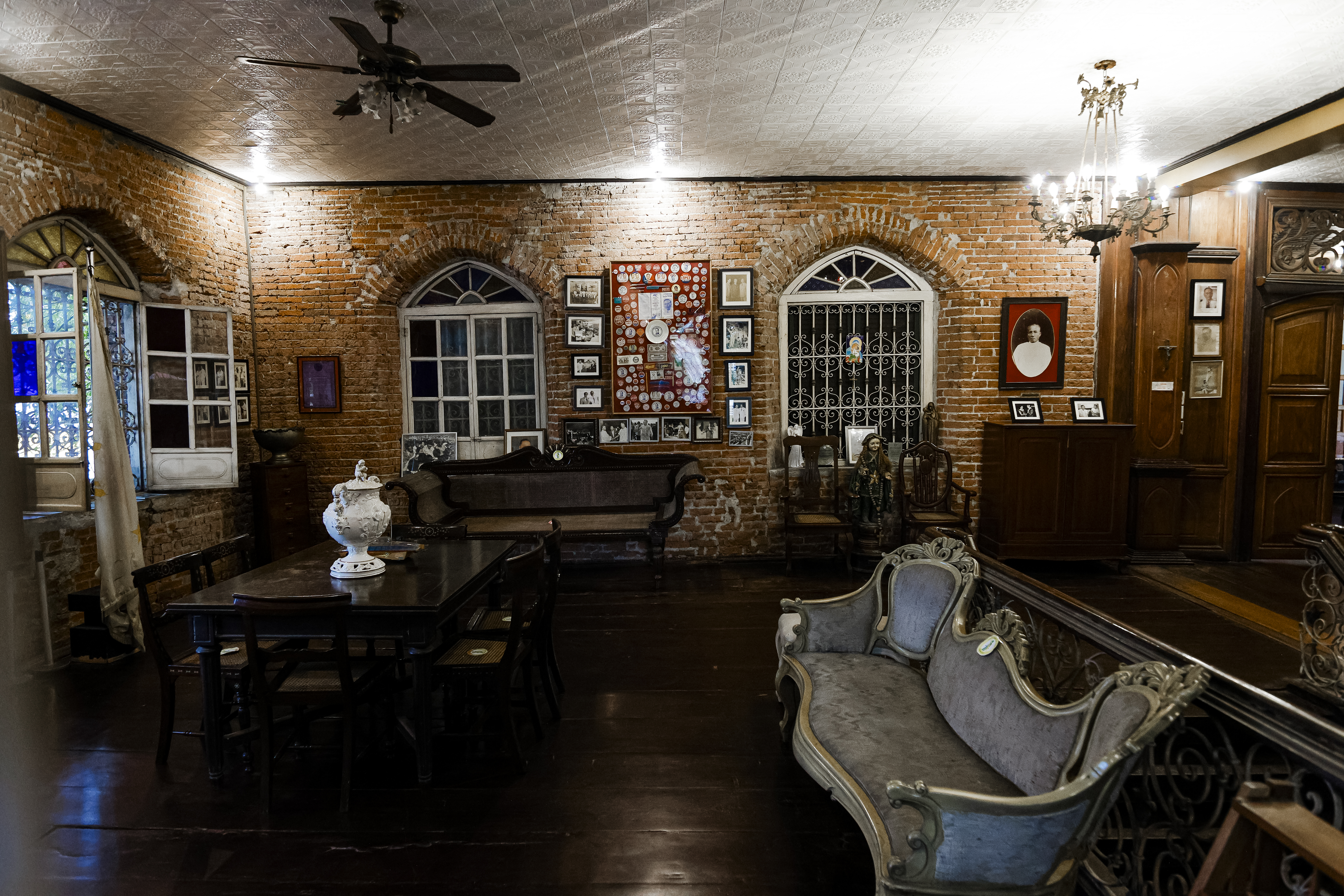

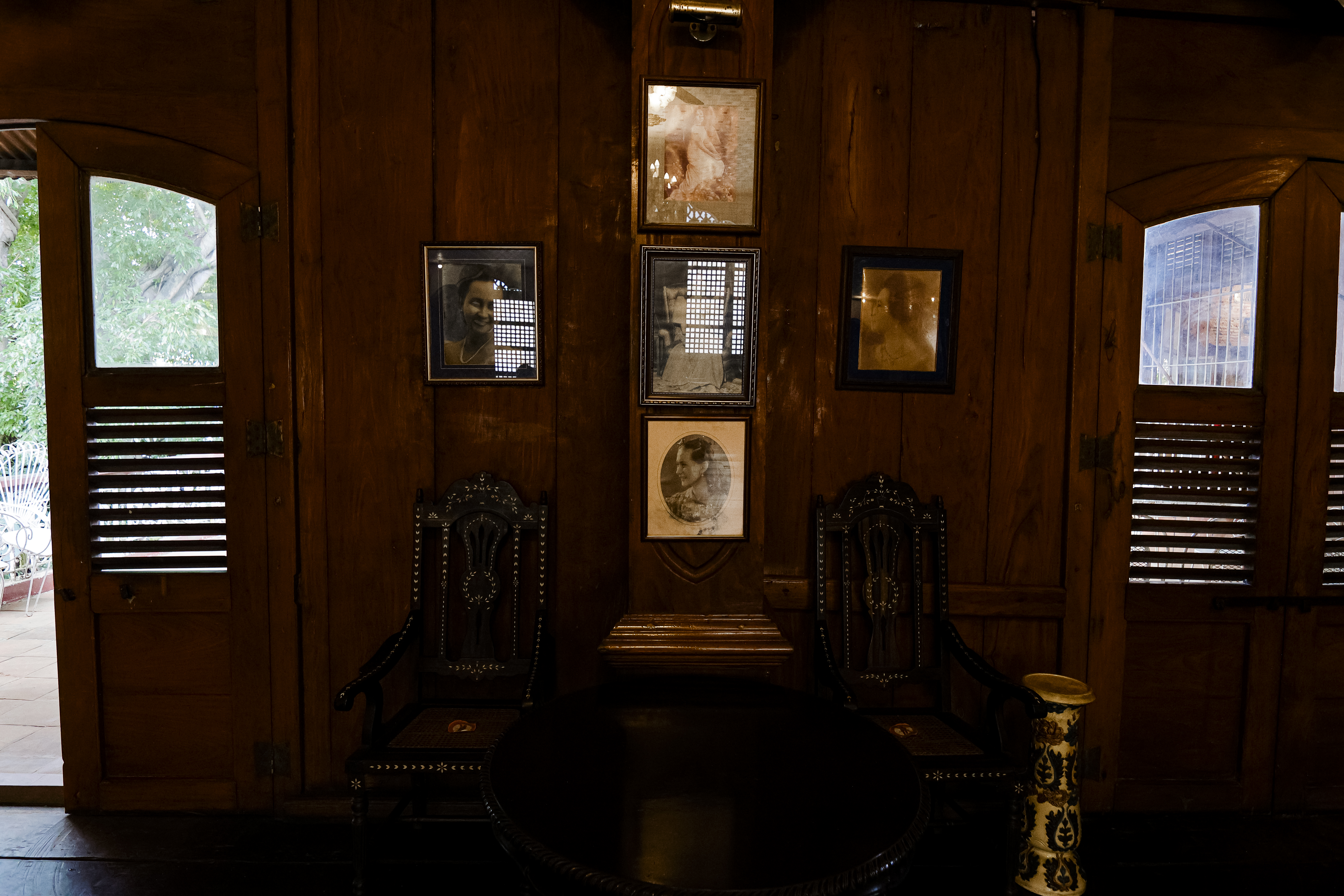

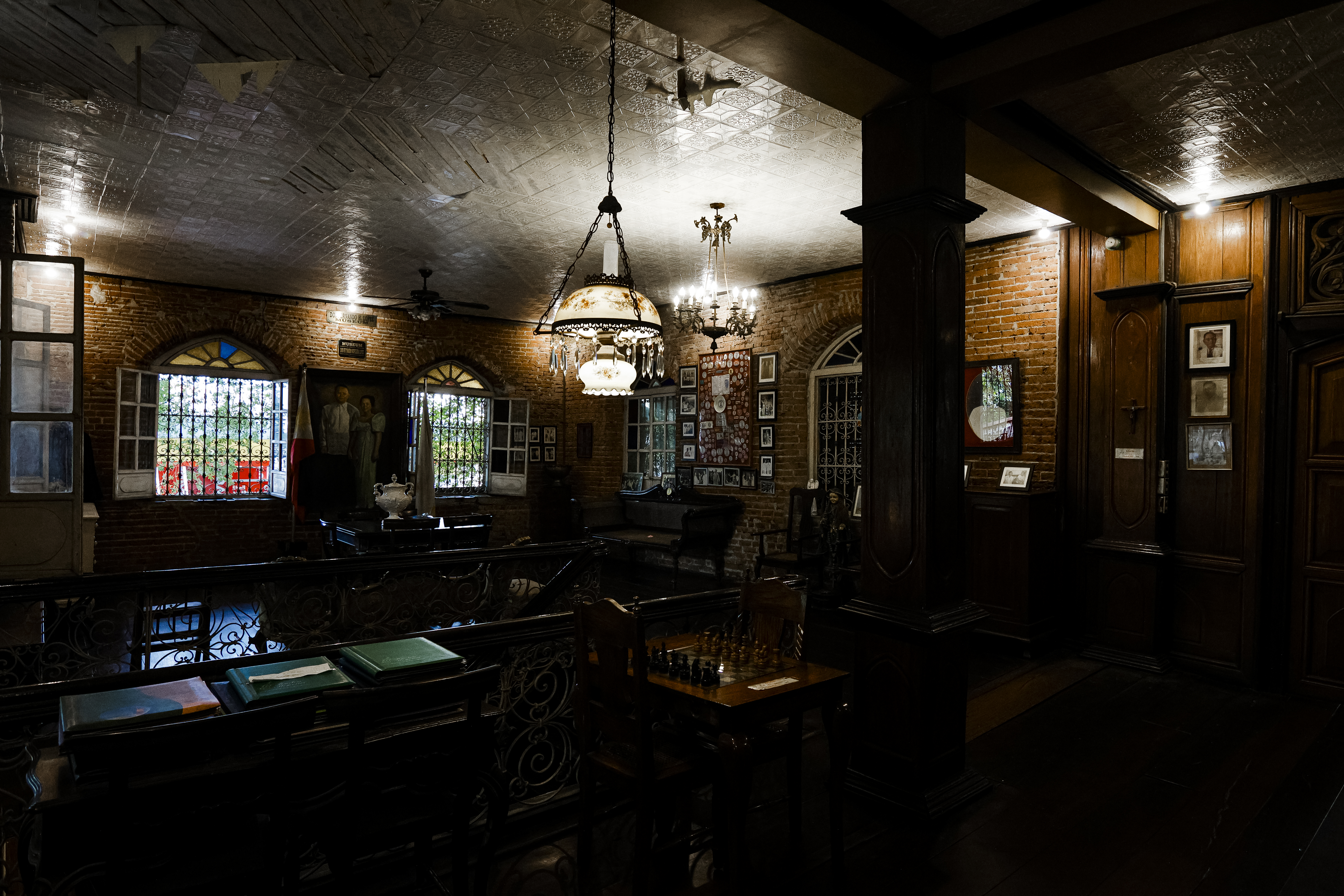

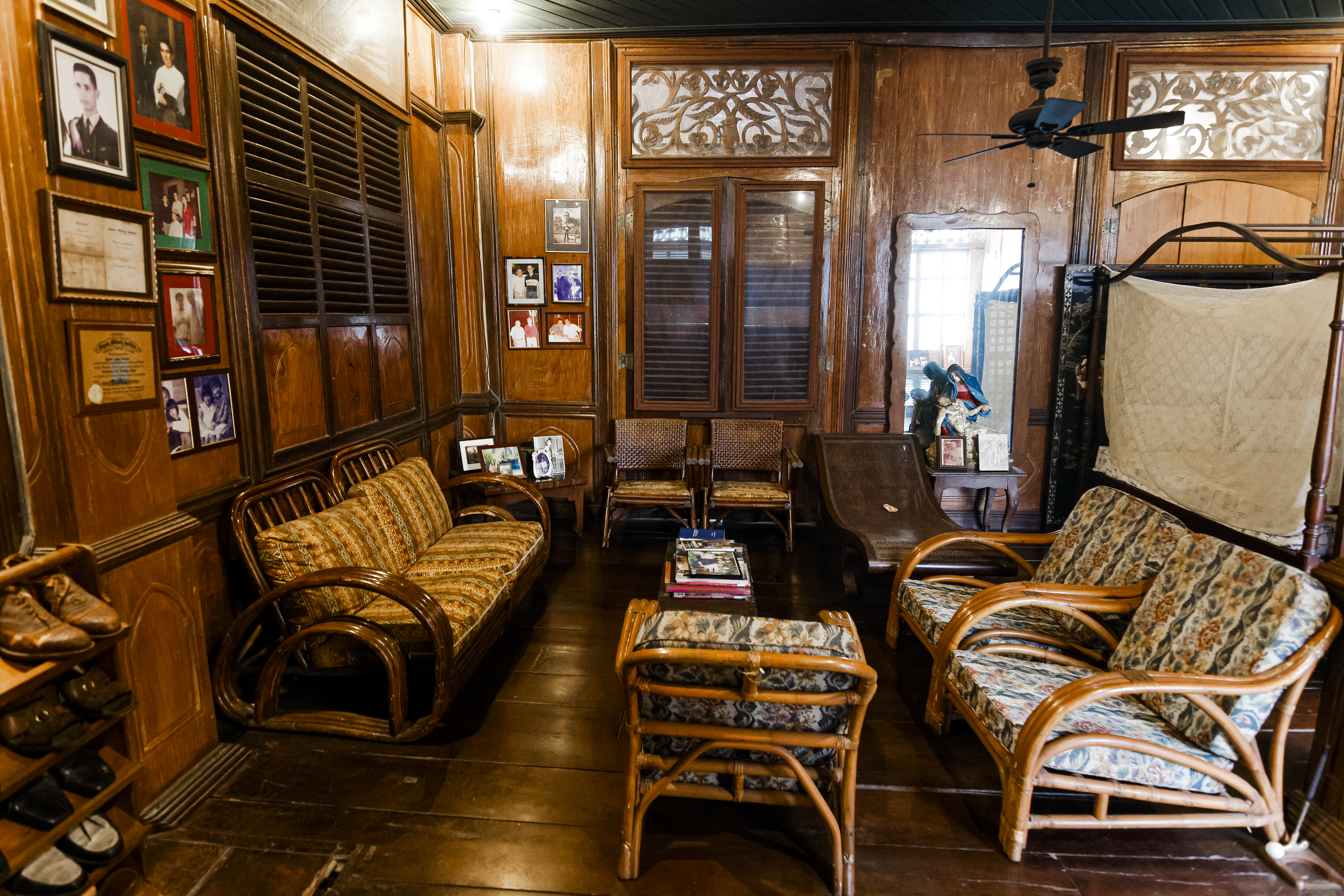

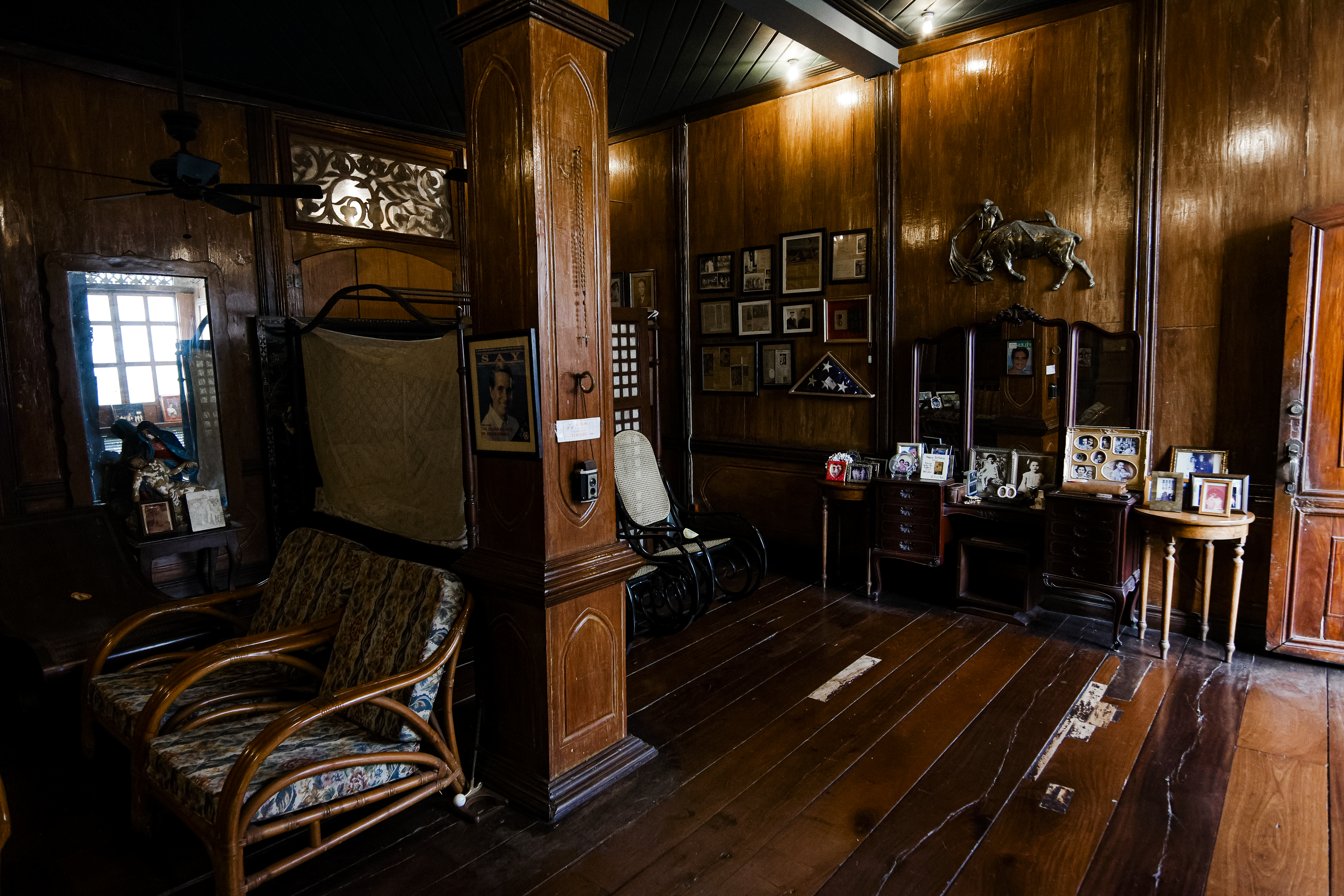

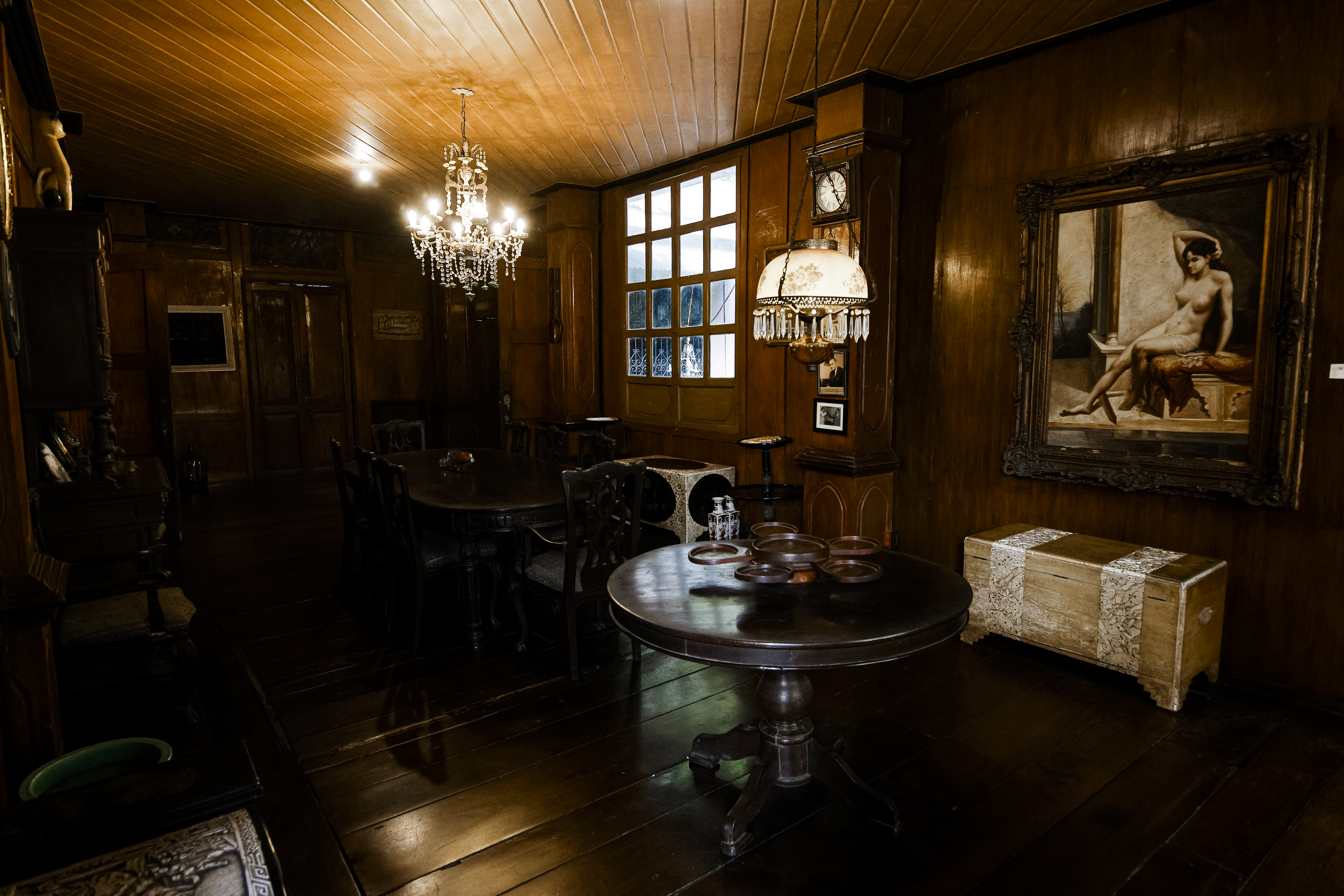

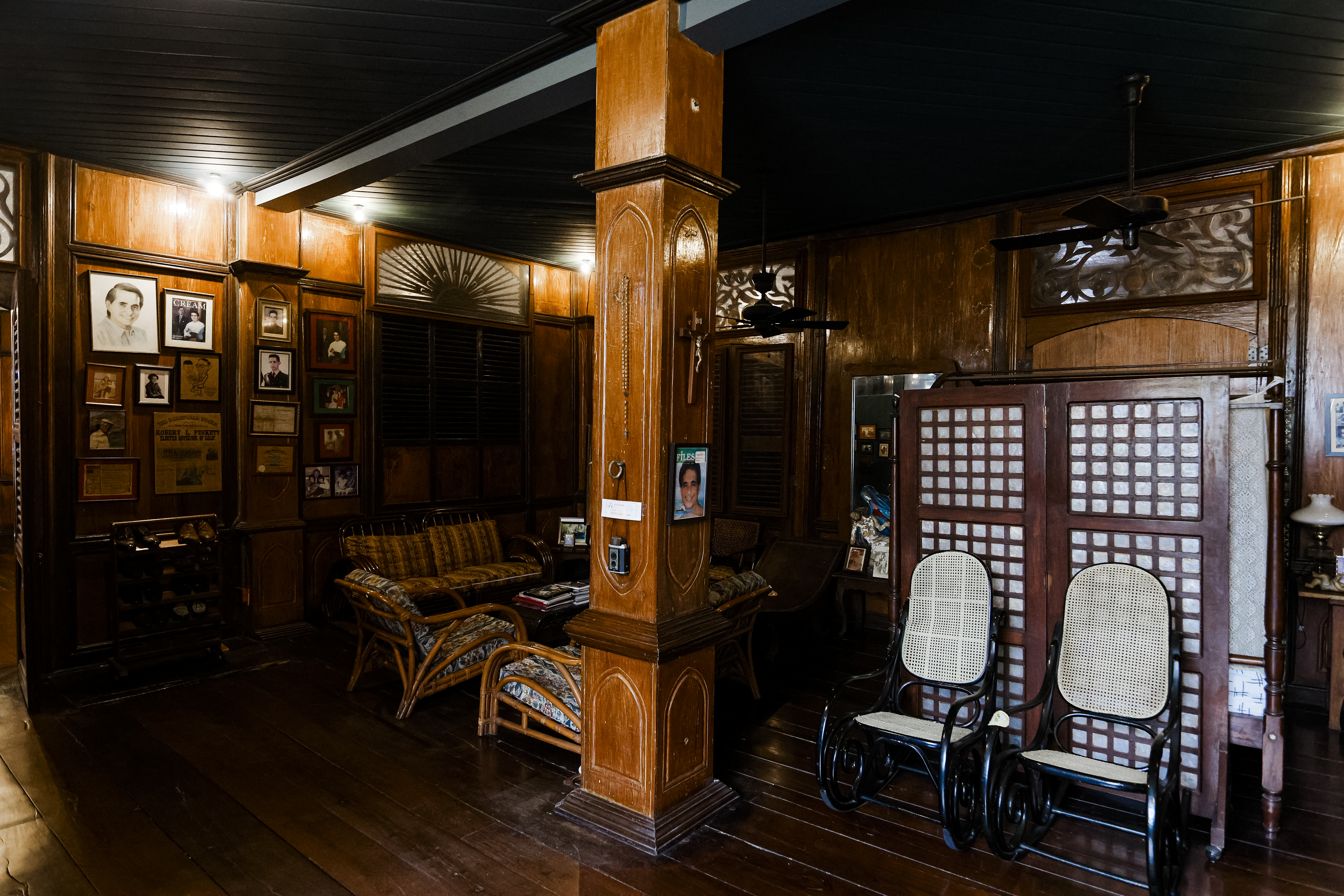

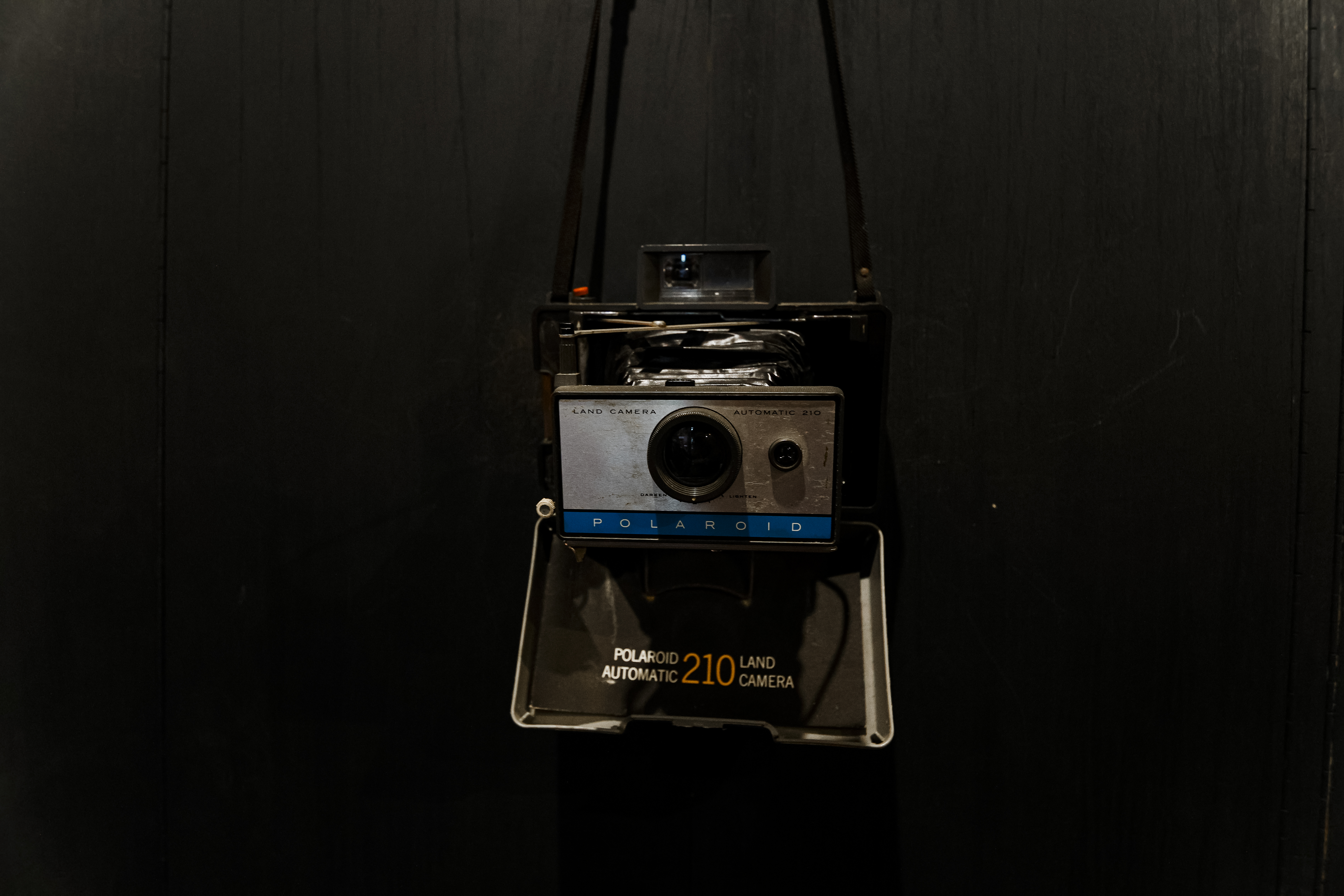

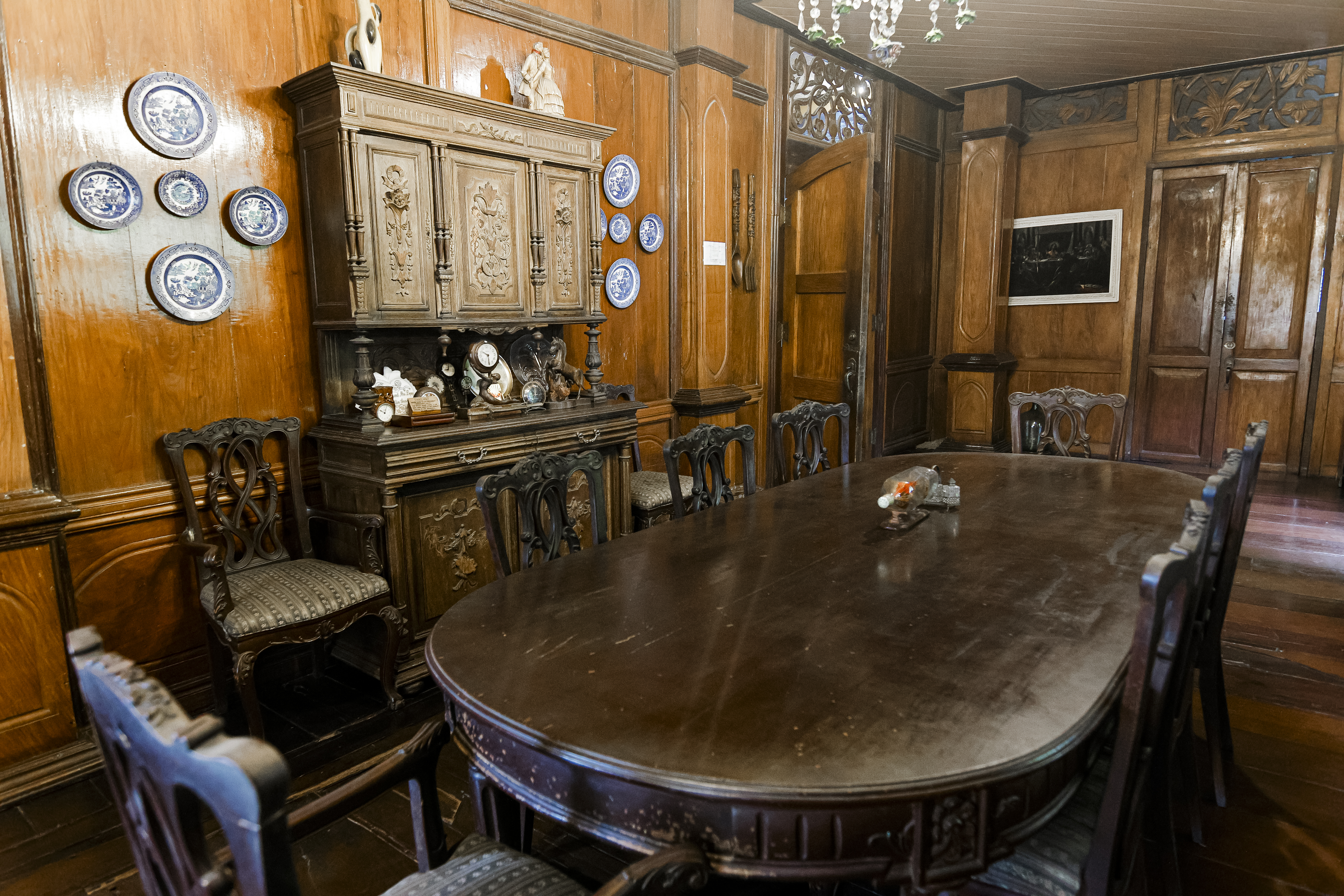

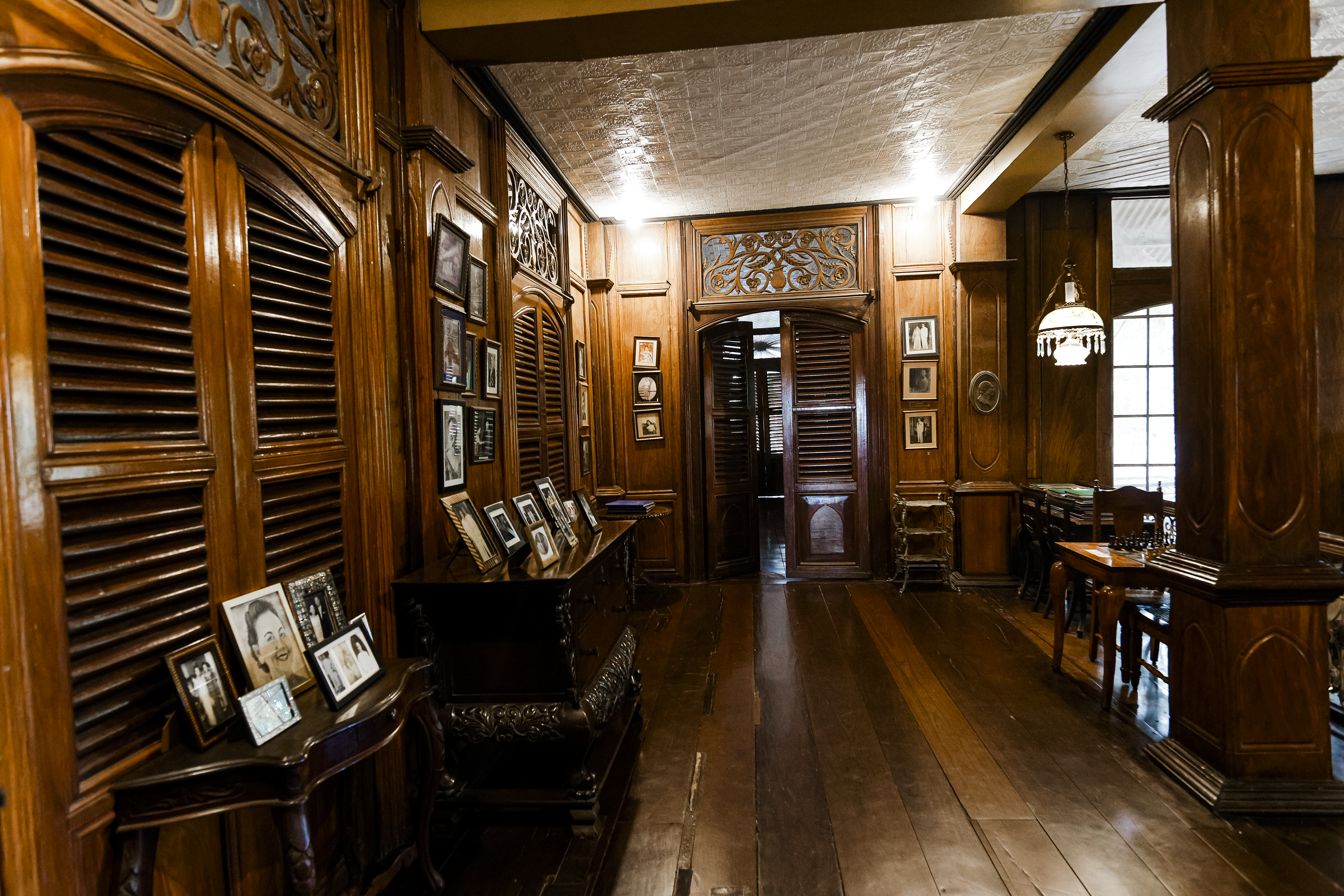

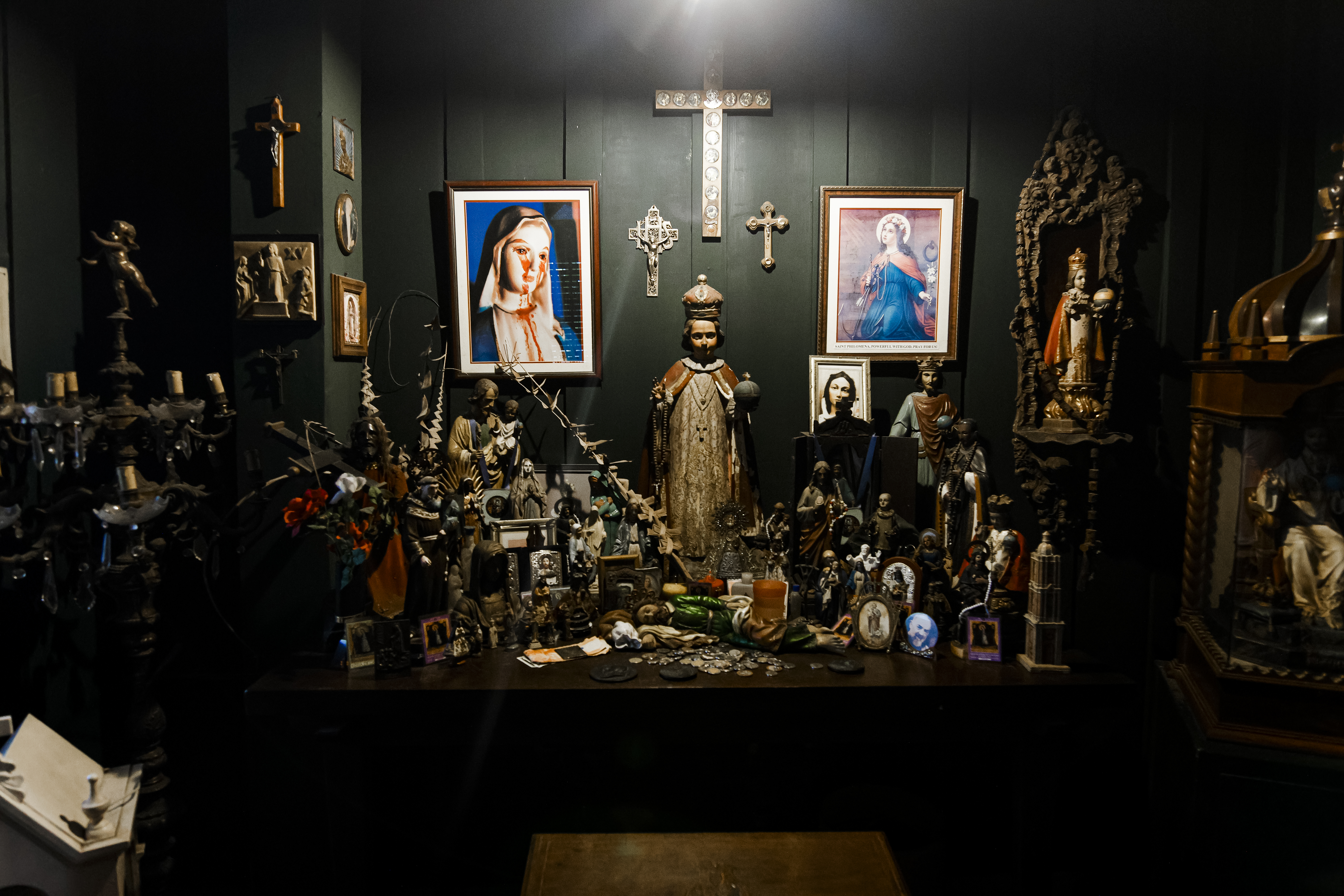

== See also ==
- Lopez Heritage House
- Lopez Boat House
