= Casa Santa Museum =

Museum in Rizal, Philippines

Coordinates: 14°35′37″N 121°10′45″E

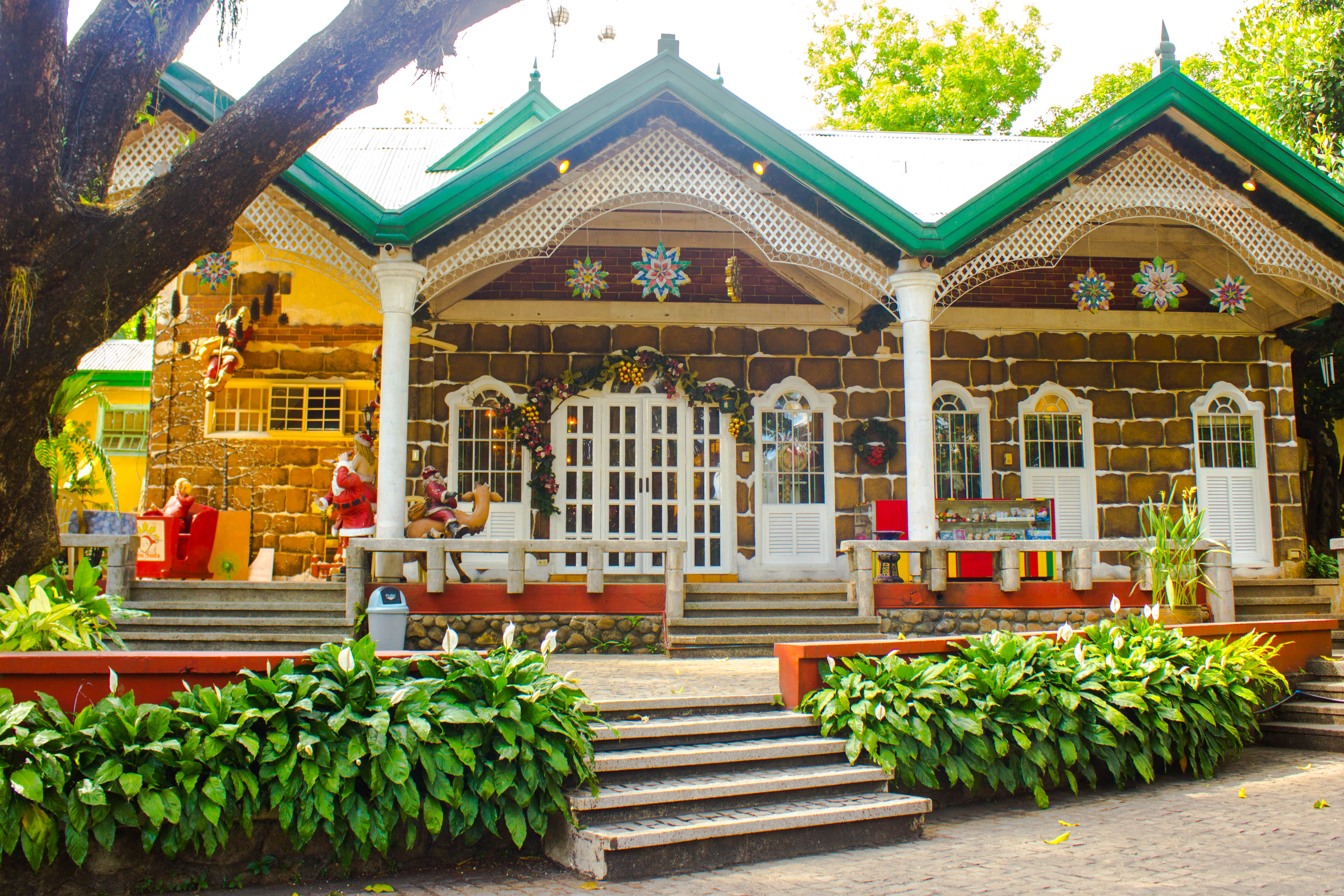
Casa Santa Museum

The Casa Santa Museum is a public attraction at Jardin de Miramar, located in Antipolo, east of Metro Manila in the Philippines. The museum features Casa Santa Houses, which contain collections of Santa Claus figurines.
