= Valenzuela, Metro Manila =

City in Metro Manila, Philippines

Valenzuela
- Highly urbanized city
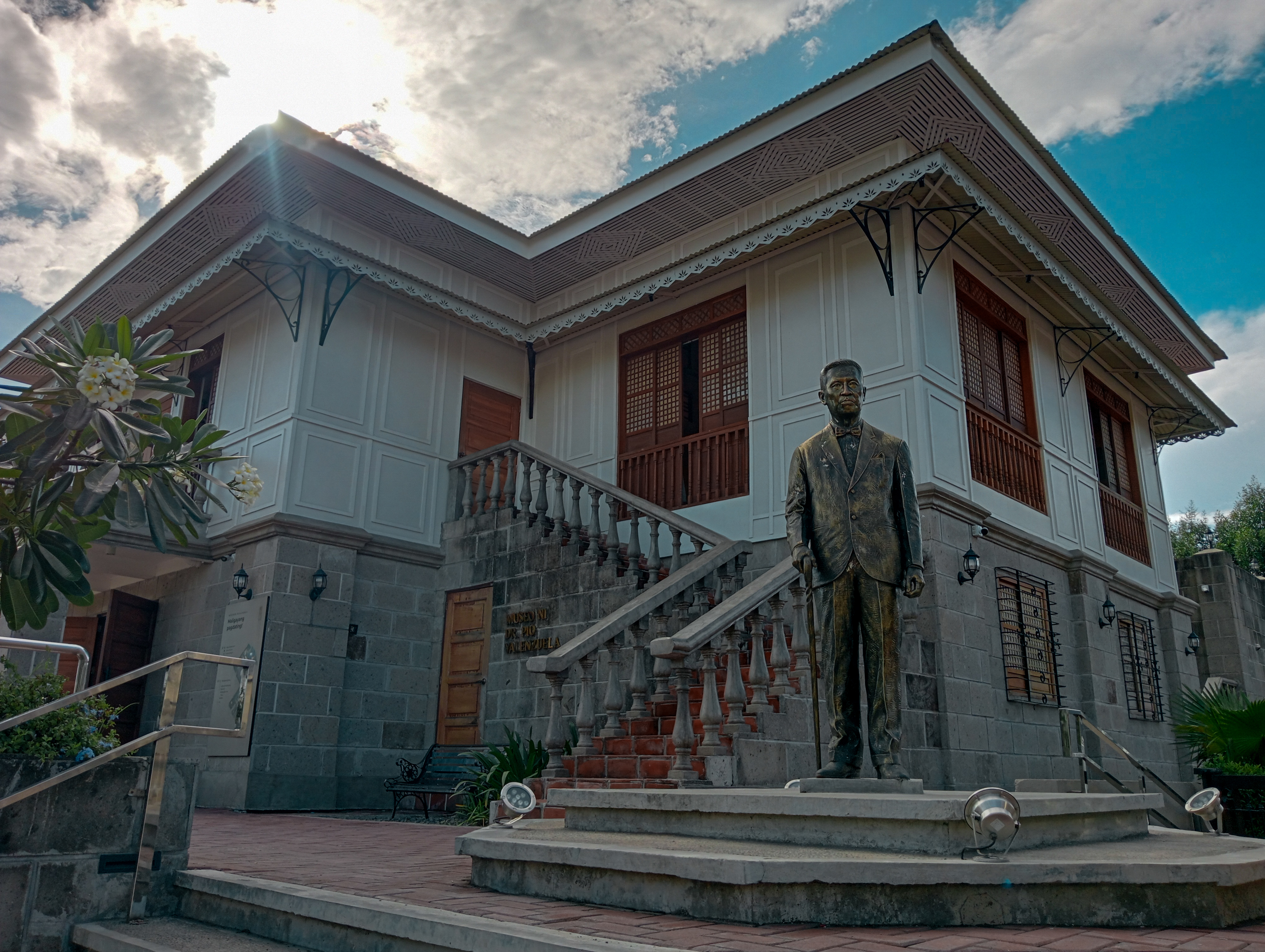
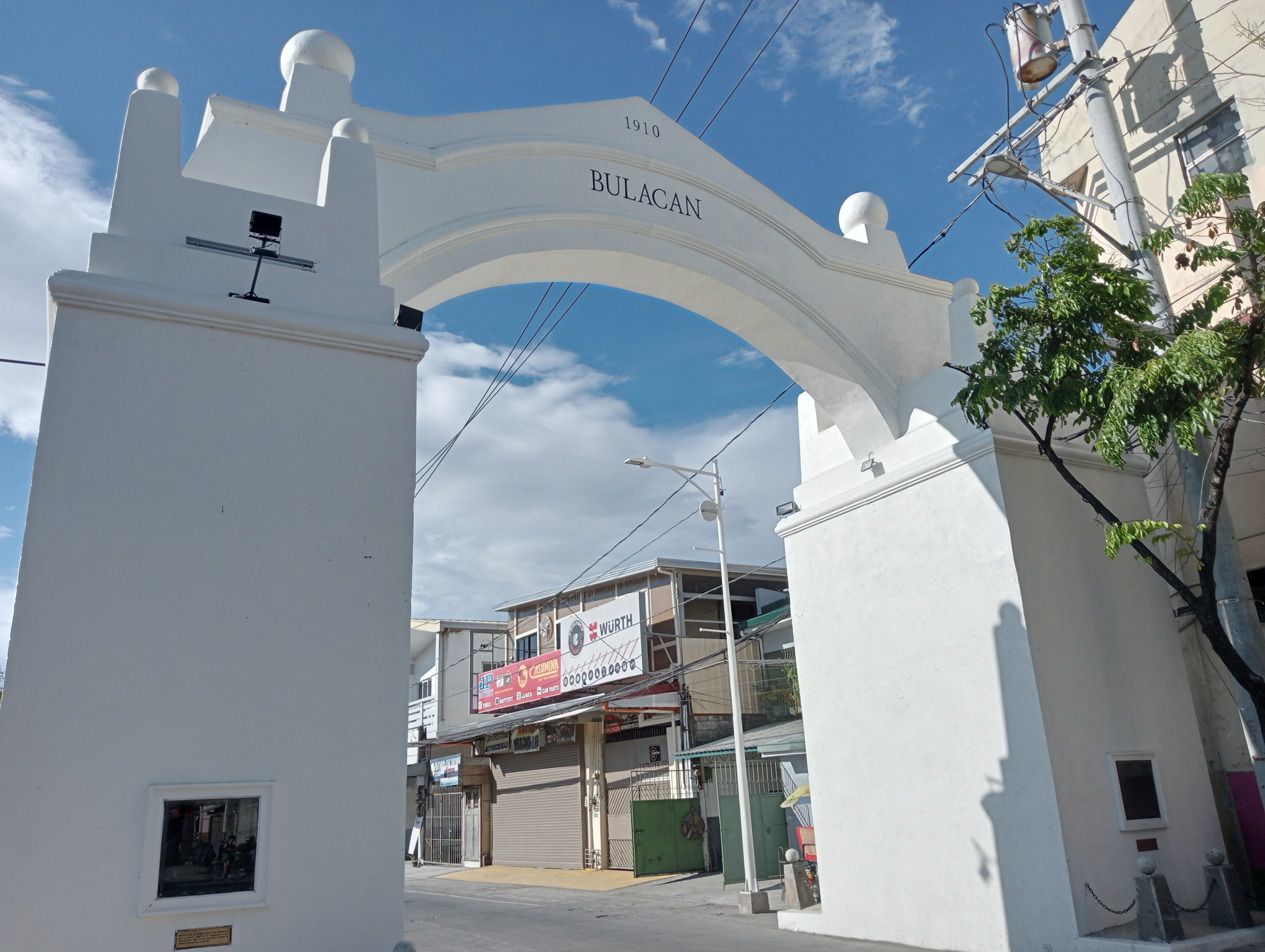
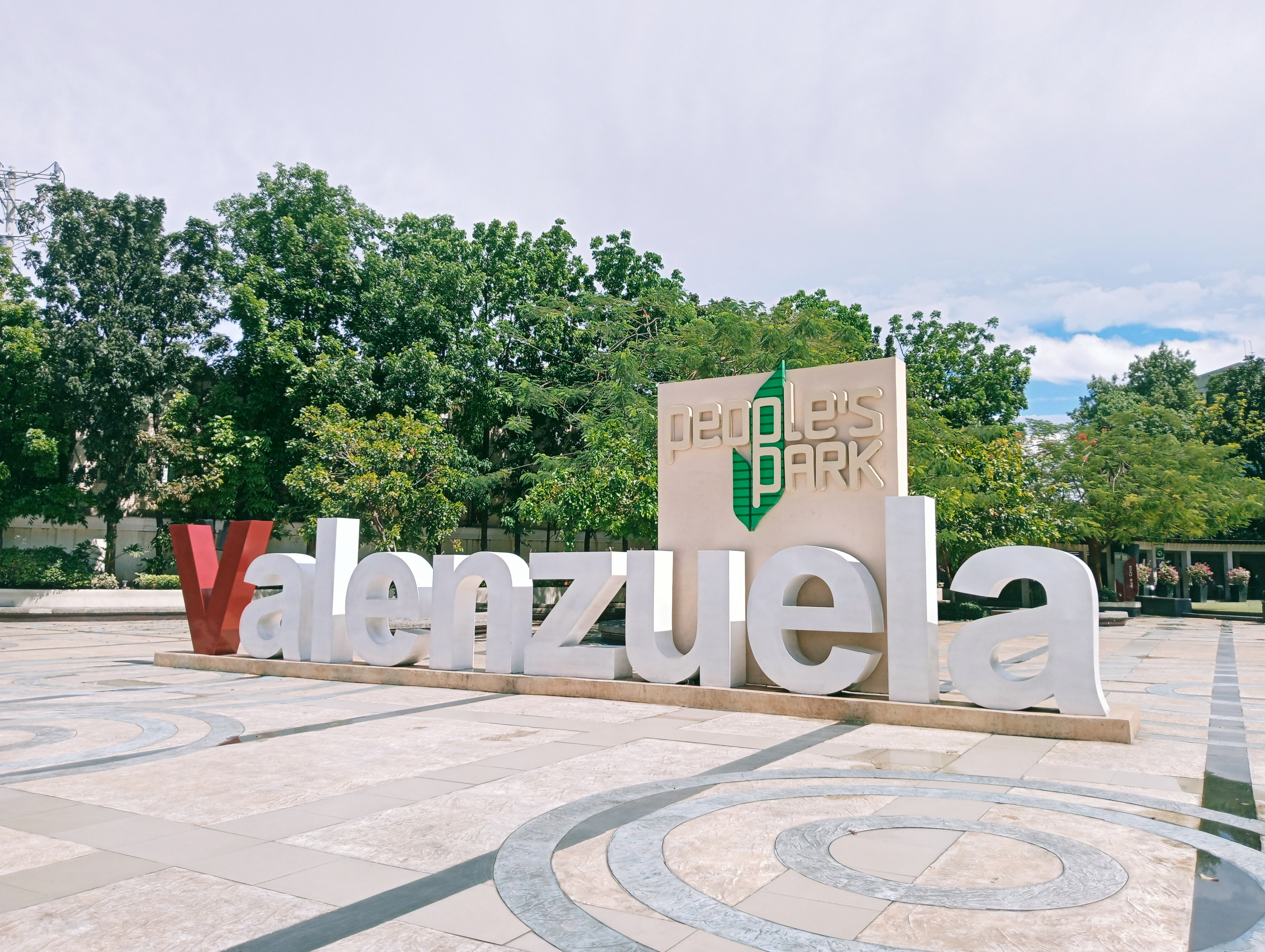
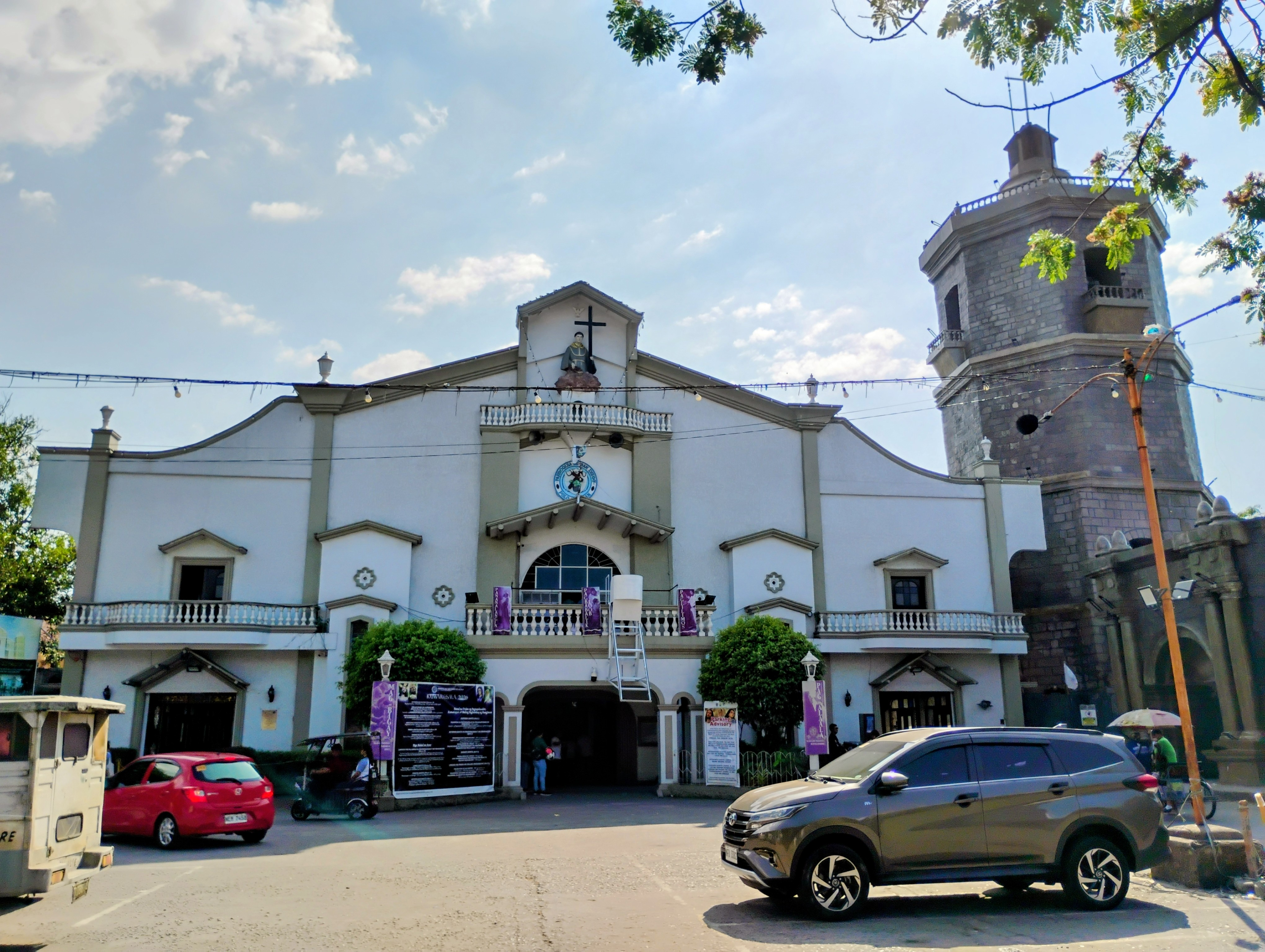
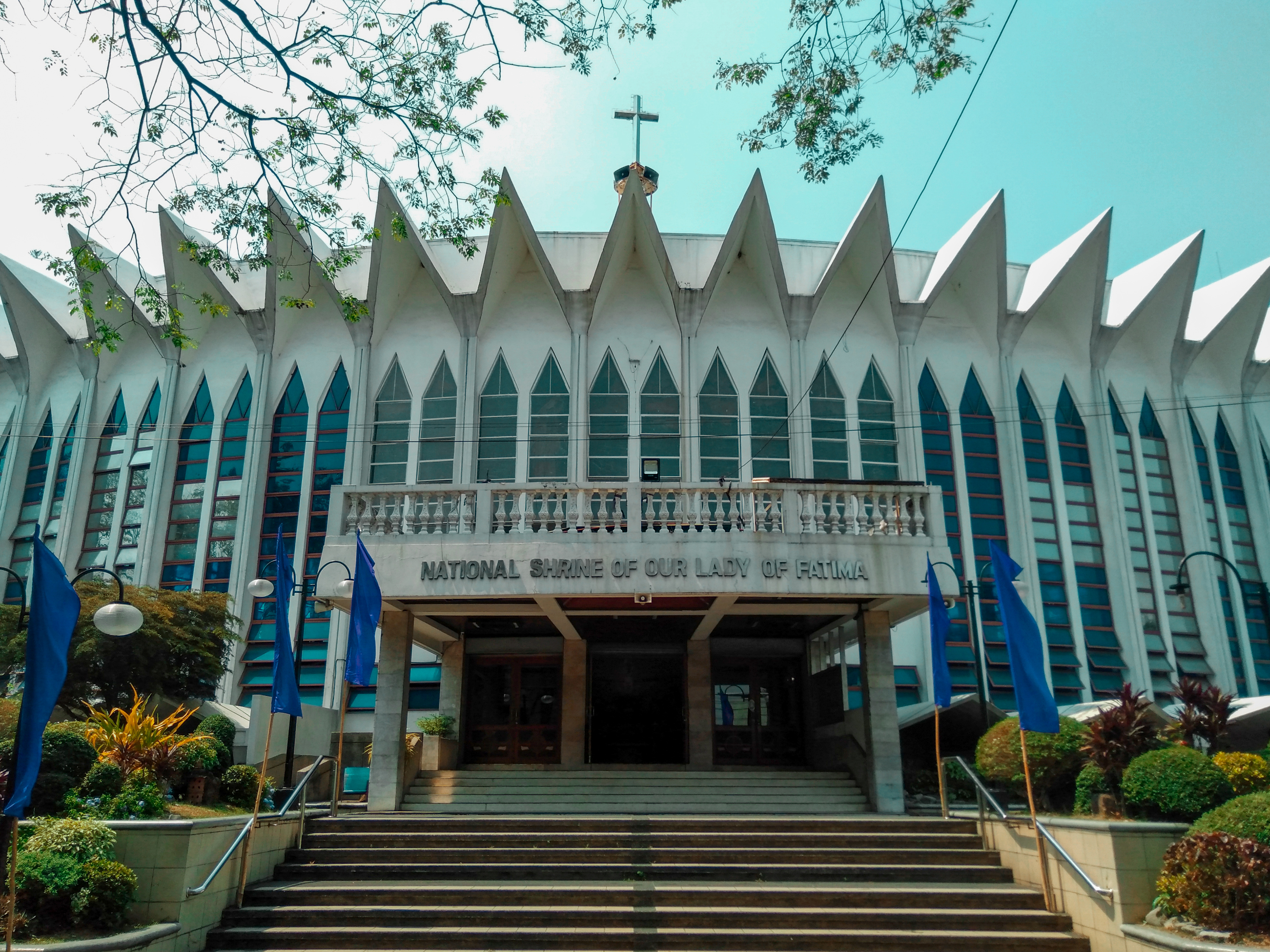
- Dr. Pio Valenzuela Museum Arkong Bato Valenzuela People's Park San Diego de Alcala Parish Church National Shrine of Our Lady of Fatima

- Flag Seal
- Mottoes: "Tayo na, Valenzuela!" "Valenzuela, May Disiplina" "Tuloy ang Progreso, Valenzuela!" "This is the Life, ValenzueLife!"
- Anthem: Himig Valenzuela; Valenzuela Hymn
- Map of Metro Manila with Valenzuela highlighted
- Interactive map of Valenzuela
- Location within the Philippines
- Coordinates: 14°42′N 120°59′E
- Country: Philippines
- Region: Metro Manila
- Province: none
- District: 1st and 2nd district
- Founded: November 12, 1623
- Cityhood and HUC: December 30, 1998
- Founder: Juan Taranco and Juan Monsód
- Named for: Pío Valenzuela
- Barangays: 33 (see Barangays)

Government
  - Type: Sangguniang Panlungsod
  - Mayor: Weslie T. Gatchalian (NPC)
  - Vice Mayor: Marlon Alejandrino (NPC)
  - Representatives: Kenneth Gatchalian (NPC) (1st District); Gerald Galang (Lakas) (2nd District)
  - City Council: Members: 1st District; Kisha Ancheta; Ricardo "Ricarr" C. Enriquez; Bimbo Dela Cruz; Goyong Serrano; Cristina Marie M. Feliciano-Tan; Joseph William D. Lee; 2nd District; Chiqui Marie N. Carreon; Lorie Natividad-Borja; Niña Shiela B. Lopez; Louie P. Nolasco; Christoffer Joseph M. Pineda; Roselle C. Sabino-Sy
  - Electorate: 438,556 voters (2025)

Area
  - Total: 47.02 km^{2} (18.15 sq mi)
  - Rank: 119th of 145 cities
- Elevation: 22 m (72 ft)
- Highest elevation: 109 m (358 ft)
- Lowest elevation: −5 m (−16 ft)

Population (2024 census)
  - Total: 725,173
  - Rank: 11th of 145 cities
  - Density: 15,420/km^{2} (39,940/sq mi)
  - Households: 193,025
- Demonym(s): Valenzolano; Valenzuelaño; Valenzuelano; Valenzolana; Valenzuelaña; Valenzuelana

Economy
  - Income class: 1st city income class
  - Poverty incidence: 1.3% (2023)
  - Revenue: ₱ 6,302 million (2024)
  - Assets: ₱ 14,196 million (2024)
  - Expenditure: ₱ 5,812 million (2024)
  - Liabilities: ₱ 5,352 million (2024)

Service provider
  - Electricity: Manila Electric Company (Meralco)
- Time zone: UTC+8 (PST)
- PSGC: 1381600000
- IDD : area code: +63 (0)02
- Native languages: Filipino
- Website: valenzuela.gov.ph

Valenzuela (/ˌvælənzjuˈɛlə/, Tagalog pronunciation: [balen'swela]; Latin American Spanish pronunciation: [balenˈswela], Spanish pronunciation: [balenˈθwela]), officially the City of Valenzuela (Filipino: Lungsod ng Valenzuela), is a highly urbanized city in the National Capital Region of the Philippines. As of the 2024 census, Valenzuela has 725,173 residents, making it one of the most densely populated cities in the Philippines.

Valenzuela ranks as the 7th-most populous city in the National Capital Region and is the 11th-most populous city in the Philippines. Located approximately 14 kilometers (8.7 mi) north of Manila, it is categorized as a highly urbanized, first-class city under the Republic Acts No. 7160 and 8526, which are based on categories of income classification and population. It is located on the island of Luzon, and is landlocked. The city is bordered to the north by the province of Bulacan; to the east by Caloocan and Quezon City; and to the southwest by Malabon. It also shares a boundary with Malabon along the Tullahan River. The city covers a land area of 45.75 km^{2} (17.66 sq mi) and has a predominantly Tagalog population.

Valenzuela began as the town of Polo, established in 1623 following its separation from Meycauayan, Bulacan. The 1899 Battle of Malinta, during the Philippine–American War, was fought in Polo. In 1960, President Carlos P. Garcia ordered the split of Polo's southern barangays to form another town named Valenzuela, after Pío Valenzuela, a physician and member of the Katipunan, a secret society that fought against the colonial government of Spain. However, in 1963, the split was revoked by President Diosdado Macapagal after political disagreements, and the merged town retained the name Valenzuela. In 1975, Valenzuela was moved from the province of Bulacan to Metro Manila, became the only area in the modern National Capital Region that was neither part of Spanish-era Manila, American-era Rizal province, nor the wartime City of Greater Manila and the modern borders of Valenzuela were established pursuant to its city charter when it became a highly urbanized city on December 30, 1998.

== Toponymy ==
The name Valenzuela is the surname of Pío Valenzuela y Alejandrino. He was a member of the Katipunan Triumvirate, which started the Philippine Revolution against Spanish colonial authorities in 1896. He also served as the provisional chairman for the Katipunan. In Spanish, Valenzuela is a diminutive form of Valencia, meaning "little Valencia".

=== Etymology ===
Before 1960, Valenzuela was formerly known as Polo, where Pío Valenzuela was born. The name Polo was derived from the Tagalog term pulô, which means "island" or "islet", although the area was not an island itself. The town of Polo was entirely surrounded by the rivers, thus creating an impression of being an island.

== History ==
=== Early Spanish period ===
During the Spanish era, present-day Valenzuela, Obando, and Novaliches (now in Quezon City) were parts of Bulacan. The areas now covered by Valenzuela included four haciendas (Malinta, Tala, Piedad, and Maysilo), small political settlements and a Spanish garrison. Collectively, these areas were known as Polo. The region was bounded by the Tullahan River to the south and streams branching from the Río Grande de Pampanga in some areas.

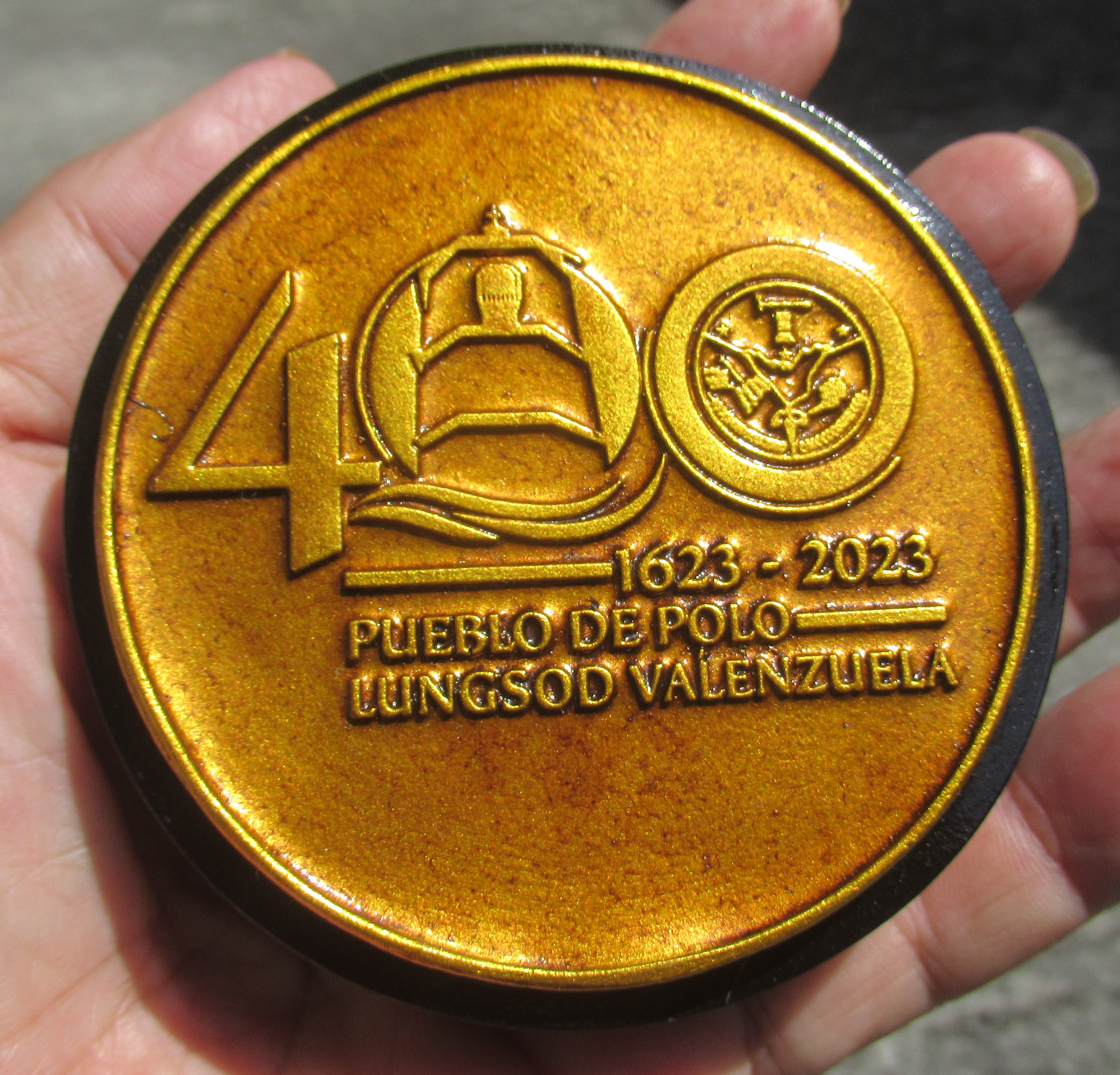
Pueblo de Polo 1623-2023

When Manila became an archdiocese in 1595, regular friars who had already established permanent churches in Meycauayan decided that the sitio of Polo should be separated from the town and have its own church to cater to its increasing spiritual needs. Through successive efforts of Franciscan friar Juan Taranco and Don Juan Monsód, the towns of Polo and Catanghalan (now part of Obando) were successfully separated from Meycauayan on November 7, 1621, at the feast day of the town's new patron, St. Didacus of Alcalá, known locally as San Diego de Alcalá. The first cabeza de barangay of Polo was Monsód, while Taranco led the parish in a small tavern, which would become the present-day San Diego de Alcalá church. The separation was then confirmed by Governor-General Alonso Fajardo de Entenza through a proclamation letter on November 12, 1623. Later, the date of November 12 was adopted as the foundation day of the city, as recommended by the National Historical Commission of the Philippines in 2012. This was due to uncertainty about the exact date of creation of the town.

=== Polo Church ===
The construction of a parochial church dedicated to St. Didacus of Alcalá began in 1627, under the supervision of José Valencia and Juan Tibay. The first church structure was completed in 1632, but its bell was looted during the Chinese uprising of 1635. At that time, Chinese merchants resided mainly in Barrio Pariancillo, which was located behind the church. In 1852, the church was repaired and remodeled under the direction of Fr. Vicente. The church was later re-dedicated to another patron, to the Nuestra Señora de la Inmaculada Concepción. A convent was also built, followed by a common house (casa tribunal) that had a rectangular prison cell and a schoolhouse made of stone. On June 3, 1865, a strong earthquake destroyed the belfry of the San Diego de Alcalá Church, followed by an epidemic that killed thousands of people.

=== Separation of Obando ===
On May 14, 1753, Governor-General Francisco Jose de Obando y Solis, Marquis of Brindisi, ordered that a new pueblo be carved out of the north-western area of Polo. The new town was named Obando, in honor of the governor-general, and was incorporated into Bulacan.

=== British invasion of Bulacan ===
In 1762-1764, during the British occupation of Manila and its surrounding suburbs, the colonial government, led by Simón de Anda y Salazar, fled to Bacolor, Pampanga via Polo. The British pursued Anda, and at one point, they stayed in sitio Mabolo while awaiting orders from the British civil Governor, Dawsonne Drake. The British explored the nearby communities of Malanday, Wakas, Dalandanan, Pasolo, Rincon and Malinta. The local population, scared of the British, fled and sought refuge in the forests of Viente Reales, where many of them succumbed to malaria. They then proceeded to Malolos, Bulacan, where they were ambushed by the stationed Spanish soldiers. After the chase, the local population of Polo returned to their homes on May 12, 1763, after days of reconstruction. The day May 12 was commemorated as the feast of St. Roch, locally known as San Roque, as another patron saint and as a memorial to those who died in the Seven Years' War.

=== Separation of Novaliches ===
The 1818 Spanish census recorded the area having 3,160 native families and 11 Spanish-Filipino families. In 1854, General Manuel Pavía y Lacy, Marquis de Novaliches, was appointed Governor-General of the Philippine Islands. Upon his arrival in Manila, he was tasked with establishing a penal colony in which prisoners would be granted land to cultivate in exchange for the prospect of eventual release. This settlement became known as Hacienda Tala, derived from the Tagalog word tala (star), reflecting local folklore about the landscape's appearance following deforestation. This hacienda grew into a larger community that eventually merged with the haciendas of Malinta and Piedad to form the independent town of Novaliches on January 26, 1856. A new road from Polo to Novaliches opened, traversing the barrios of Mabolo, Pasolo, Rincon, Malinta, Masisan, Paso de Blas, Canumay, and Bagbaguin.

=== Revolutionary period ===
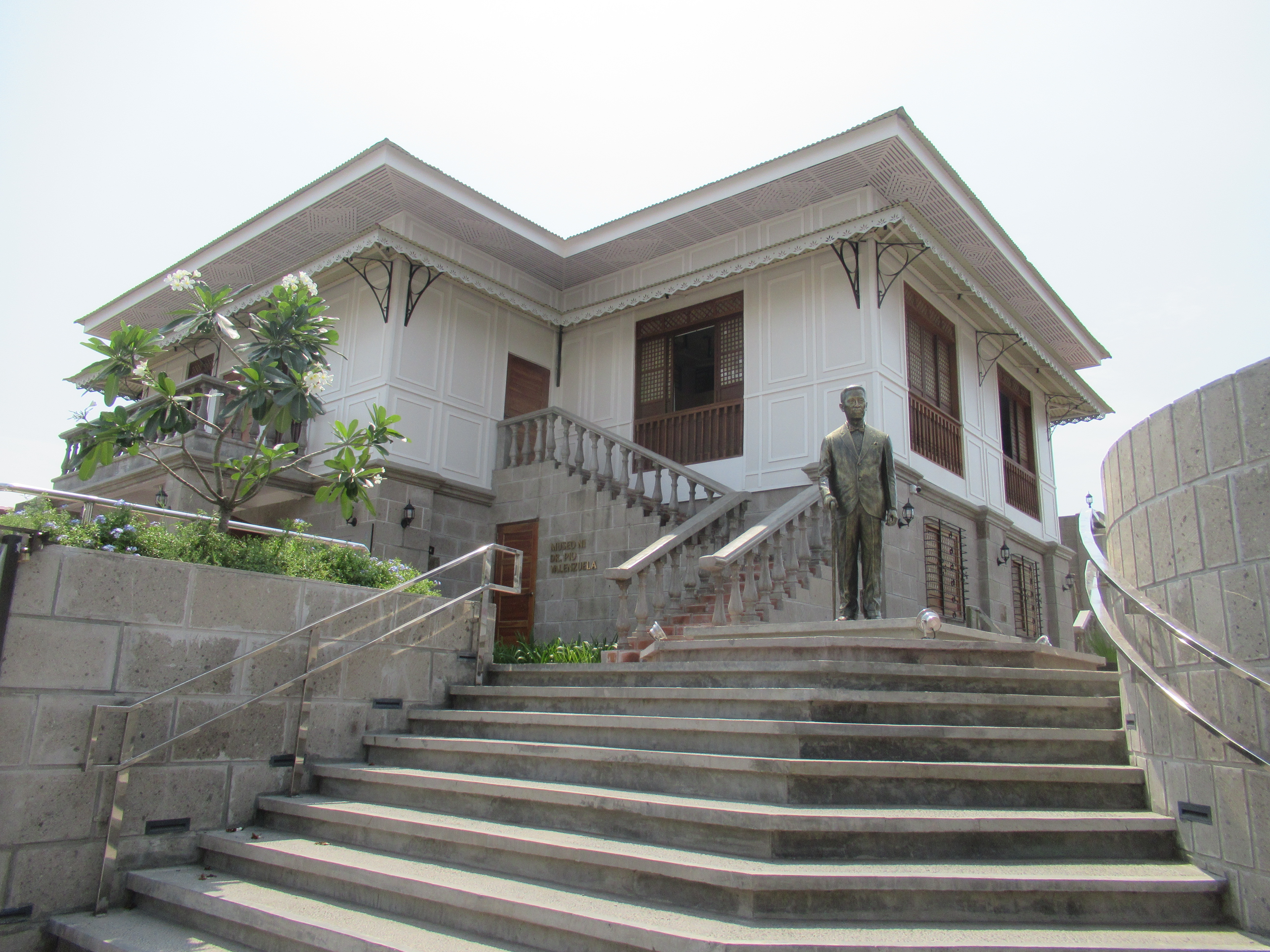
Dr. Pío Valenzuela Ancestral House, which has been converted into a museum called Museo ni Dr. Pío Valenzuela

In 1869, Filipino physician and patriot Pío Valenzuela was born in Polo. He would later be known as one of the key leaders of the Katipunan, which he joined in 1892 at the age of 23. His admission to the society led to more recruits from Polo, including Ulpiano Fernández, Gregorio Flamenco, Crispiniano Agustines, and Faustino Duque. When Valenzuela was the chief editor, Fernández held a special role in the Katipunan as a printer of the Ang Kalayaan, the organization's official newspaper.

The now-defunct Manila-Dagupan Railway opened in 1892 and traversed the barrios of Marulas, Caruhatan, Malinta, Dalandanan and Malanday, with the station being in Dalandanan.

A constituted branch of the Katipunan was established in Polo on February 1, 1896. The town joined other revolutionaries when the Philippine Revolution broke out in August 1896, while Valenzuela availed the amnesty offered by Spanish authorities a few weeks later. Filipino forces under General Tiburcio de León y Gregorio achieved a tactical victory in an engagement at Bitik and Pasong Balite (Pugad Baboy), temporarily repelling American forces, though American reinforcements subsequently forced Filipino withdrawal. During the revolution, the Spanish massacred many residents, most of them in Malinta. Suspected revolutionaries were hanged and tortured to death. Many were forced to admit guilt or shout innocent names; others were shot without trial.

=== American invasion period ===
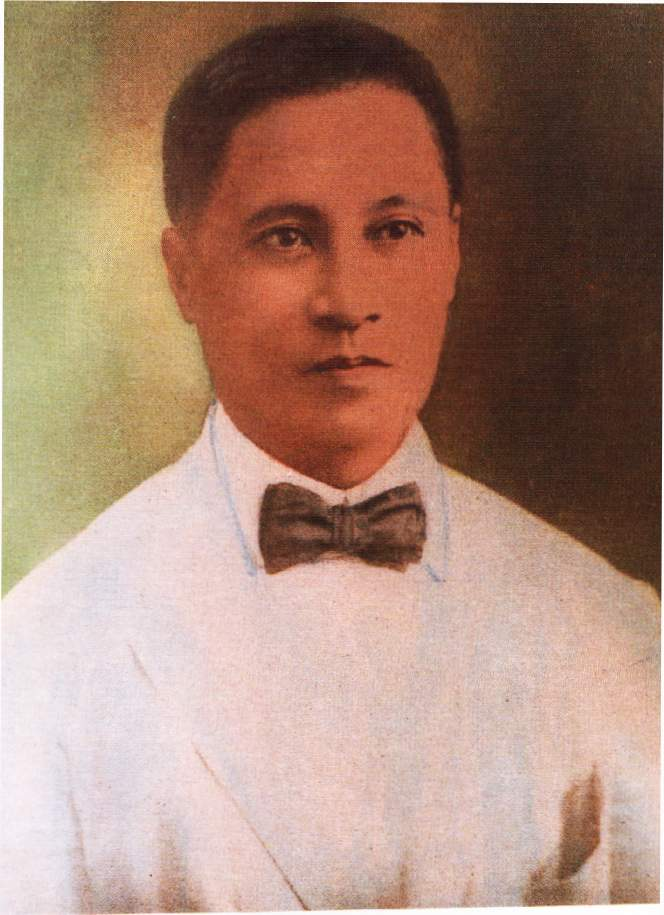
Valenzuela was named after Pío Valenzuela, a Filipino revolutionary who was born in Polo in 1869.

The Americans imposed a military government when they acquired the Philippine Islands from Spain as part of the peace treaty of the Spanish–American War. They appointed Pío Valenzuela as the first municipal president of Polo on September 6, 1899, to suppress aggressive leadership in the area. He resigned in February 1901 to become the head of the military division, and an election was held. Later that year, the government proclaimed Rufino Valenzuela, a relative of Pío, as the second president and first elected municipal president of the town.

When the Philippine–American War broke out in early 1899, the Americans were directed to capture Emilio Aguinaldo, who was escaping to Malolos, Bulacan. Polo was one of the towns where Aguinaldo retreated; thus, it received heavy casualties in the first stages of the war. On February 22, 1899, General Antonio Luna camped at Polo after an unsuccessful engagement with the American forces in Caloocan. A bloody battle on March 26, 1899, happened near the barrio chapel of Malinta. The Filipino forces had to retreat with the arrival of American reinforcements after being initially successful in defending Malinta and killing Colonel Harry Egbert.

On October 8, 1903, the adjacent town of Obando merged with Polo by virtue of Act No. 932. It was later separated from Polo, effective August 10, 1907, by virtue of Act No. 1588 dated January 25, 1907.

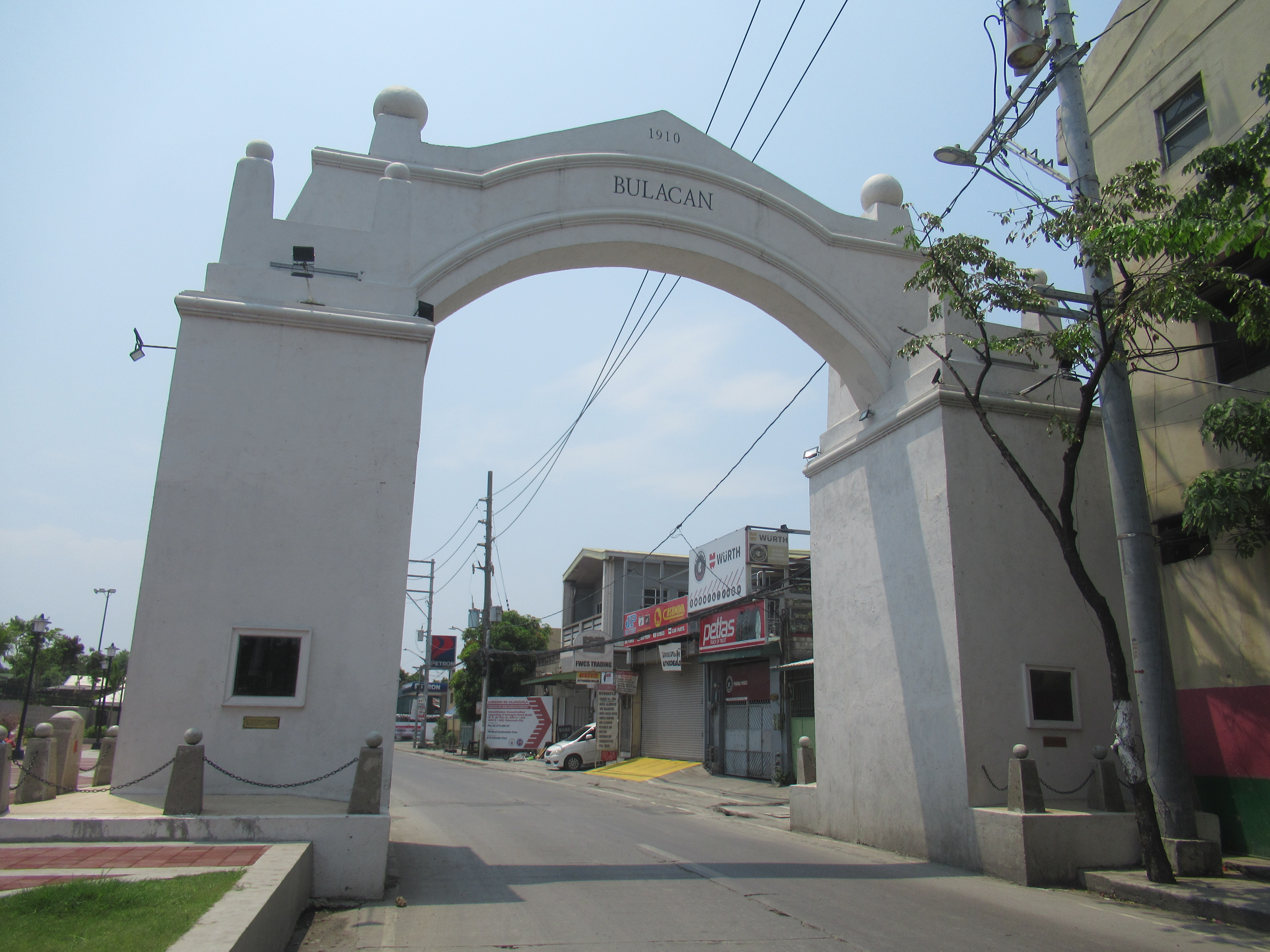
The stone arch in Barangay Arkong Bato, built by the Americans in 1910, serves as the boundary marker to the old town of Polo.

In 1910, a stone arch was built at its municipal boundary with Malabon, Rizal, along Calle Real (modern-day Marcelo H. Del Pilar Street). In 1928, Manila North Road (Highway 3) opened and became the new gateway. The once-agricultural town slowly shifted to an industrial one. Businesses soon put up factories, the most famous of which is the Japanese venture Balintawak Beer Brewery that opened in 1938.

=== Japanese occupation period ===
The entrance of the Japanese into Polo during the Second World War was met with almost no resistance. However, there were still many murders committed. The place became a centre of Makapili and spies. It was found that the Balintawak Beer Brewery became a front for manufacturing ammunition for the Japanese forces. The old church of San Diego de Alcalá was used by the Japanese forces as a torture chamber.

On December 10, 1944, Japanese forces massacred more than a hundred men in both towns. From about 1:00am until dawn, cries could be heard from the municipal building where men were being tortured to death. Mayor Feliciano Ponciano was killed along with other municipal officials.

During the 1945 liberation campaign, Allied forces (Filipino and American) conducted bombing and artillery bombardment operations against Japanese positions in Valenzuela. These operations resulted in significant civilian damage, including harm to the 17th-century San Diego de Alcalá Church, which was subsequently damaged by shellfire.

During World War II, retreating Japanese forces destroyed the bridge connecting the northern and southern sections of Polo to slow the Allied advance. The northern section was subsequently liberated by Filipino guerrillas and American forces. The historical old bridge connecting northern and southern areas of the town was destroyed by the Japanese, thus separating Polo in two parts. The northern part was at once liberated by joint Filipino and American troops while the southern part, which includes the municipal center poblacion was still under the Japanese banner. The Japanese abandoned the town on February 11, 1945, when the combined troops were able to cross the river and took the town.

The highest elevation point is 38 meters (125 ft) above sea level. Having a surface gradient of 0.55% and a gentle slope, the hilly landscape is located in the industrial section of the city in Canumay. The average elevation point is 2 meters (6.6 ft) above sea level.

The vegetation in Valenzuela was originally covered with grasslands suitable for agriculture. Because of the rapid development of industries and the economy, land use converts grass covers into cemented roads. However, the government made efforts to preserve vegetation, such as constructing community vegetable gardens and techno-demo farms all over the city. In 2003, these gardens numbered up to two functioning farms.

There is a playground, interactive fountain, aviary, fitness machines, amphitheater, and a food park in the park. The park is also pet-friendly, bike-friendly, and accessible to persons with disability.

On February 11, 1945, the joint Filipino-American force crossed the river and the Japanese abandoned the town, completing its liberation.

=== Philippine independence ===
In 1947, the Balintawak Beer Brewery was acquired by San Miguel Brewery. The Spanish church was never rebuilt, and only the belfry and the entrance arch remained. A new church was built perpendicular to the ruins of the old one.

On July 21, 1960, President Carlos P. Garcia signed Executive Order No. 401, which divided Polo into two: Polo and Valenzuela. Polo comprised the northern barangays of Wawang Pulo, Población, Palasan, Arkong Bato, Pariancillo Villa, Balangkas, Mabolo, Coloong, Malanday, Bisig, Tagalag, Rincon, Pasolo, Punturin, Bignay, Viente Reales, and Dalandanan. Valenzuela, on the other hand, comprised the southern barangays of Karuhatan, Marulas, Malinta, Ugong, Mapulang Lupa, Canumay, Maysan, Parada, Paso de Blas, Bagbaguin and Torres Bugallón (now Gen. T. de Leon). A provisional town hall was built across today's SM City Valenzuela, until a permanent town hall was built near the intersection of MacArthur Highway and the old Polo-Novaliches Road.

The division soon proved to be detrimental to economic growth in each town, so Bulacan Second district Representative to the Fifth Congress, Rogaciano Mercado, and Senator Francisco Soc Rodrigo filed a bill that sought the reunification of the two towns. On September 11, 1963, President Diosdado Macapagal signed Executive Order No. 46, which reunified Valenzuela and Polo, adopting Valenzuela as the name of the resulting town.

In 1967, Mayor Ignacio Santiago Sr. purchased lots in Karuhatan in which the new municipal hall would be built. Misinterpretation of property surveys and tax appropriation issues sparked the debate on which barangay the municipal hall belonged to: Karuhatan, Malinta, or Maysan. To resolve the issue, Santiago ordered the creation of a new barangay, which was called Poblacion II, a reference to the old Poblacion barangay.

==== Incorporation of Metro Manila ====
On November 7, 1975, jurisdiction over Valenzuela was moved from the province of Bulacan to Metro Manila. Metro Manila was then headed by First Lady Imelda Marcos as its governor. Due to this, Valenzuela is the only area in the modern National Capital Region that was neither part of Spanish-era Manila, American-era Rizal province, nor the wartime City of Greater Manila.

In 1968, the North Diversion Road (now North Luzon Expressway) was opened. Rail transport to the city ceased in 1988 with the closure of the Philippine National Railway's North Line.

==== Cityhood ====
The passage of the Local Government Code in 1991 provided local governments with autonomy, which has allowed them to develop into self-reliant communities. On February 14, 1998, President Fidel V. Ramos signed Republic Act No. 8526, which converted the municipality of Valenzuela into a highly urbanized chartered city. The law also ordered the division of the newly created city into two legislative districts. When Republic Act No. 8526 was ratified on December 30, 1998, Valenzuela became a highly urbanized city, the 12th in Metro Manila and 83rd in the Philippines.

=== Contemporary ===
In 2002, President Gloria Macapagal Arroyo proclaimed July 11 every year as Valenzuela Day, which was an official holiday in the city that commemorates the birth date of Pío Valenzuela. However, in 2008, the date of the city's charter day was transferred to February 14. Today, Valenzuela celebrates Valenzuela Day and Valenzuela Foundation Day on February 14 and November 12 respectively.

On December 9, 2002, the National Capital Region Police Office announced that they had discovered the largest illegal drug factory in the country within a Chinese-owned warehouse in Lawang Bato after a fire broke out in the building, achieving the largest methamphetamine drug bust at the time with over ₱2.2 billion worth of drugs seized.

On May 13, 2015, a fire broke out in the Kentex Manufacturing factory in Barangay Ugong, killing 74 people in the incident. In 2016, the Ombudsman ordered the dismissal of Mayor Rex Gatchalian and other city officials due to grave misconduct and negligence of duty during the incident. This is dubbed as the third worst fire incident in the country.

== Geography ==
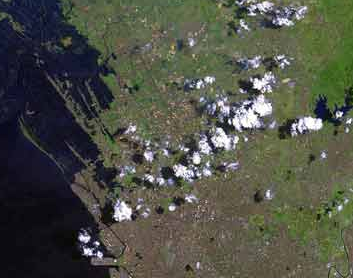
Satellite image of Valenzuela.

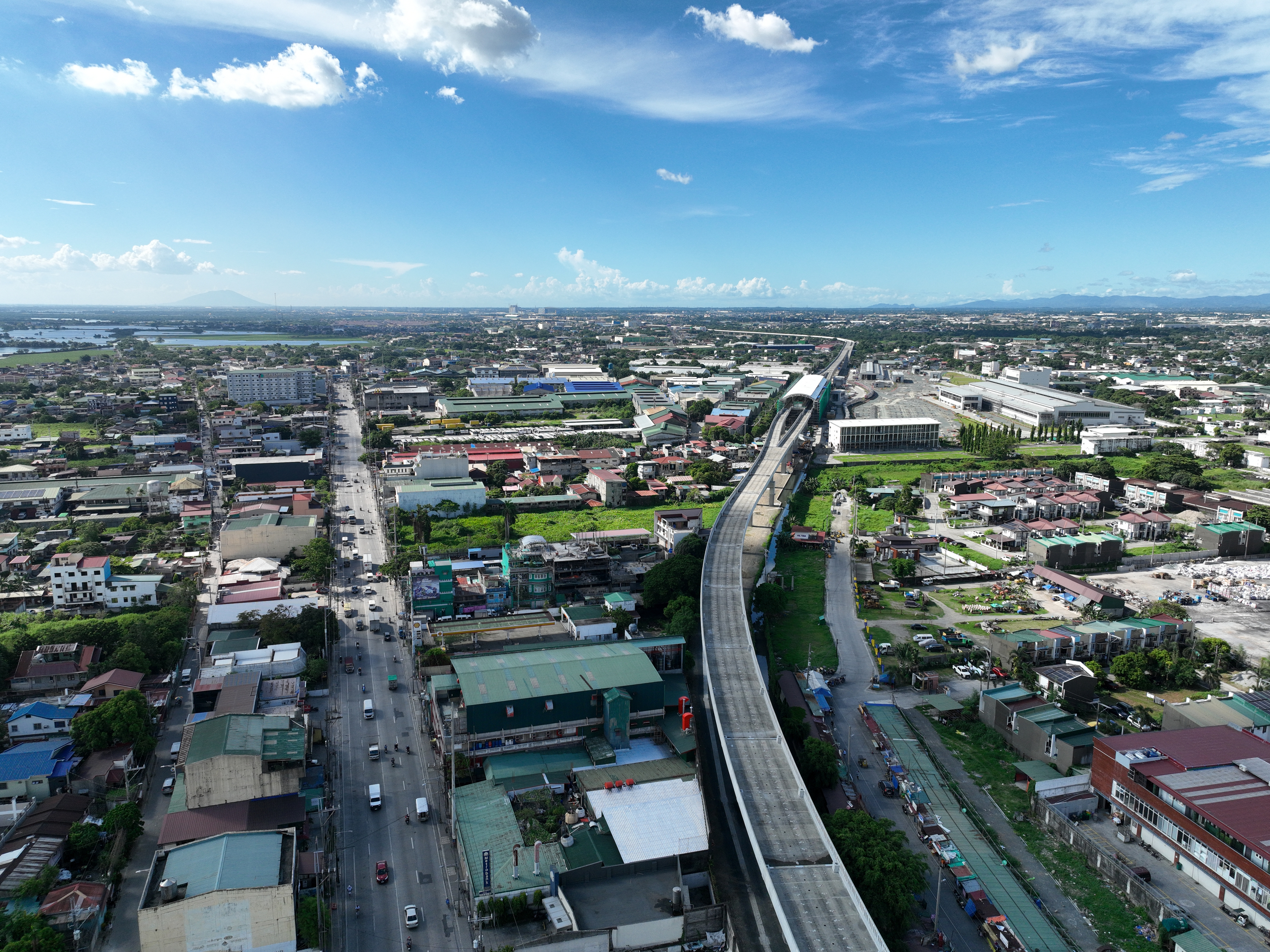
Aerial view of Valenzuela, 2026

Valenzuela is located at 14°40′58″N 120°58′1″E, about 14 kilometers (8.7 mi) north of the country's capital, Manila. Manila Bay, the country's top port for trade and industry, is located about 16.3 kilometers (10.1 mi) west of the city. Valenzuela is bordered in the north by Obando and Meycauayan (Bulacan), to the west by Navotas, and to the east by Quezon City and northern Caloocan.

Apart from the political borders set by the law, Valenzuela and Malabon are also separated by the 15-kilometer (9.3 mi) Tenejeros-Tullahan River or simply Tullahan River. The river derived its name from tulya or clam due to the abundance of such shellfish in the area. Tullahan is a part of the Marilao-Meycauayan-Obando river system of central Luzon. The river has been severely degraded by industrial pollution, resulting in poor water quality and markedly diminished aquatic biodiversity. Tullahan riverbanks used to be lined with mangrove trees and rich with freshwater fish and crabs. Children used to play in the river before it was polluted by developing industries near it.

To save the river, the Department of Environment and Natural Resources, Metropolitan Manila Development Authority, and the local governments of Valenzuela and Malabon signed partnerships with private and non-government organizations to dredge the area.

Increased climate variability, which is associated with global warming, has brought with it periods of heavy rainfall and high tides, which in turn have resulted in stagnant waters that can stay in the area for up to 4 weeks due to insufficient drainage and improper solid waste disposal. People are often stranded inside their homes and are exposed to waterborne diseases such as dengue and leptospirosis. Better early warning systems are needed to manage the risk associated with increased rainfall.

=== Administrative divisions ===
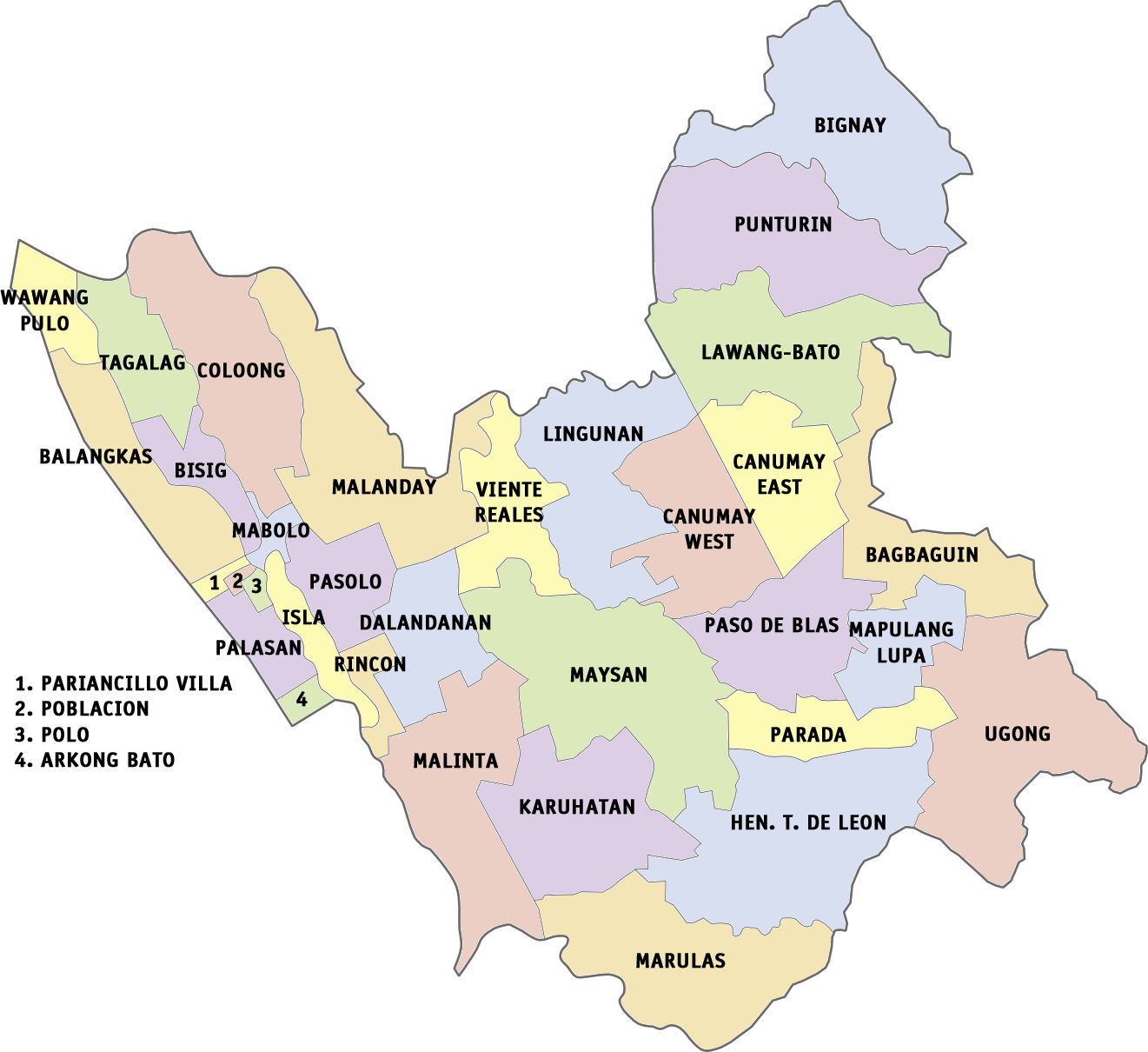
Political map of Valenzuela

Valenzuela has 33 barangays, the smallest administrative unit in the city. The barangay is headed by the barangay captain, or punong barangay and his 7-member local council, or mga kagawad, duly elected by the residents. The youth sector of the barangay is represented by the youth council called the Sangguniang Kabataan (SK), headed by the SK chairperson and his 7-member assembly, also known as mga SK kagawad. There are 33 punong barangays and 231 kagawads in Valenzuela; SK officials are also of the same number. The barangays also serve as census areas of the city.

At the national level, Valenzuela is divided into two congressional districts: the first legislative district in the northern half of the city, which contains 24 barangays, and the second legislative district in the southern half of the city, which contains the remaining 9 barangays. Unlike barangays, the legislative districts have no political leader but are represented by congressional representatives in the House of Representatives of the Philippines.

District I
| Barangay | Population (2024) | | Area^{[a]} | | ZIP Code | Established |
|---|---|---|---|---|---|---|
| Arkong Bato | 1.5% | 10,746 | 34.40 | 85.0 | 1444 | |
| Balangkas | 2.0% | 14,658 | 73.30 | 181.1 | 1445 | |
| Bignay | 7.4% | 53,837 | 268.80 | 664.2 | 1440 | |
| Bisig | 0.2% | 1,448 | 45.60 | 112.7 | 1440 | |
| Canumay East | 2.1% | 15,058 | 217.30 | 537.0 | 1447 | |
| Canumay West | 3.7% | 26,517 | 141.30 | 349.2 | 1443 | |
| Coloong | 1.8% | 13,035 | 223.80 | 553.0 | 1445 | |
| Dalandanan | 2.8% | 20,084 | 93.90 | 232.0 | 1443 | |
| Isla | 0.7% | 5,161 | 39.60 | 97.9 | 1440 | |
| Lawang Bato | 3.3% | 23,880 | 287.50 | 710.4 | 1447 | |
| Lingunan | 3.5% | 25,423 | 115.90 | 286.4 | 1446 | |
| Mabolo | 0.2% | 1,122 | 115.00 | 284.2 | 1444 | |
| Malanday | 2.7% | 19,344 | 295.60 | 730.4 | 1444 | |
| Malinta | 7.4% | 53,486 | 174.10 | 430.2 | 1440 | |
| Palasan | 0.9% | 6,786 | 15.60 | 38.5 | 1444 | |
| Pariancillo Villa | 0.3% | 1,989 | 5.00 | 12.4 | 1440 | |
| Pasolo | 1.1% | 8,190 | 79.50 | 196.4 | 1444 | |
| Poblacion | 0.0% | 224 | 3.40 | 8.4 | 1440 | |
| Polo | 0.2% | 1,147 | 5.20 | 12.8 | 1444 | |
| Punturin | 3.5% | 25,170 | 162.20 | 400.8 | 1447 | |
| Rincon | 1.0% | 7,097 | 24.40 | 60.3 | 1444 | |
| Tagalag | 0.5% | 3,468 | 101.00 | 249.6 | 1440 | |
| Viente Reales | 2.6% | 18,874 | 192.90 | 476.7 | 1440 | |
| Wawang Pulo | 0.6% | 4,198 | 27.80 | 68.7 | 1440 | |
District II
| Barangay | Population (2024) | | Area^{[a]} | | ZIP Code | Established |
| Bagbaguin | 2.1% | 15,524 | 159.10 | 393.1 | 1440 | |
| Gen. T. de Leon | 13.7% | 99,317 | 366.90 | 906.6 | 1442 | |
| Karuhatan | 5.9% | 42,845 | 190.60 | 471.0 | 1441 | |
| Mapulang Lupa | 4.2% | 30,775 | 140.80 | 347.9 | 1448 | |
| Marulas | 8.5% | 61,583 | 224.70 | 555.2 | 1440 | |
| Maysan | 3.2% | 23,501 | 253.30 | 625.9 | 1440 | |
| Parada | 3.0% | 21,602 | 34.40 | 85.0 | 1440 | |
| Paso de Blas | 1.8% | 12,882 | 155.00 | 383.0 | 1442 | |
| Ugong | 7.8% | 56,202 | 307.20 | 759.1 | 1440 | |
| Total | | 725,173 | 47.02 | 18.15 | | |

=== Climate ===
Valenzuela

Climate chart (precipitation, max. and min. temperature)
| J | F | M | A | M | J | J | A | S | O | N | D |
| 18 30 21 | 10 31 21 | 13 32 23 | 30 34 24 | 159 34 25 | 318 32 25 | 477 31 24 | 503 31 24 | 369 31 24 | 194 31 24 | 140 31 23 | 65 30 22 |
- █ Average max. and min. temperatures in °C
- █ Precipitation totals in mm
- Source: BBC Weather (Manila)
Imperial conversion
| J | F | M | A | M | J | J | A | S | O | N | D |
| 0.7 86 71 | 0.4 87 71 | 0.5 90 73 | 1.2 93 75 | 6.3 93 76 | 13 90 76 | 19 88 75 | 20 87 75 | 15 87 75 | 7.6 88 74 | 5.5 87 73 | 2.6 86 72 |
- █ Average max. and min. temperatures in °F
- █ Precipitation totals in inches

Due to its location in Metro Manila, the climate of Valenzuela is almost similar to the country's capital, Manila. Given its geographic location on the west coast of the Philippines, the Philippine Atmospheric, Geophysical and Astronomical Services Administration (PAGASA) classifies Valenzuela as Type I under its weather scheme. Wind from the Pacific Ocean is generally blocked by the Sierra Madre mountain range several kilometers east of the city.

Its proximity to the equator tends to give the city a very small temperature range, from as low as 20 °C (68 °F) to as high as 35 °C (95 °F), although humidity makes these hot temperatures feel much hotter. The Köppen climate system classifies Valenzuela's climate as a borderline tropical monsoon (Am) and tropical savanna (Aw) due to its location and precipitation characteristics. This means the city has two pronounced seasons: dry and wet seasons.

Humidity levels are usually high in the morning, especially during June–November, making it feel warmer. The lowest humidity levels are recorded in the evening during the wet season. Discomfort from heat and humidity is extreme during May and June, and is higher than in other places in the country. The average sunlight is highest in April at 254.25 hours and lowest in July, August and September at 113 hours.

Climate data for Valenzuela, Philippines
| Month | Jan | Feb | Mar | Apr | May | Jun | Jul | Aug | Sep | Oct | Nov | Dec | Year |
|---|---|---|---|---|---|---|---|---|---|---|---|---|---|
| Mean daily maximum °C (°F) | 29.8 (85.6) | 30.7 (87.3) | 32.4 (90.3) | 33.9 (93.0) | 33.8 (92.8) | 32.2 (90.0) | 31.1 (88.0) | 30.6 (87.1) | 30.7 (87.3) | 31.0 (87.8) | 30.6 (87.1) | 29.9 (85.8) | 31.4 (88.5) |
| Daily mean °C (°F) | 25.6 (78.1) | 26.0 (78.8) | 27.4 (81.3) | 28.9 (84.0) | 29.2 (84.6) | 28.3 (82.9) | 27.5 (81.5) | 27.3 (81.1) | 27.3 (81.1) | 27.3 (81.1) | 26.8 (80.2) | 26.0 (78.8) | 27.3 (81.1) |
| Mean daily minimum °C (°F) | 21.4 (70.5) | 21.4 (70.5) | 22.5 (72.5) | 23.9 (75.0) | 24.7 (76.5) | 24.5 (76.1) | 24.0 (75.2) | 24.0 (75.2) | 23.9 (75.0) | 23.6 (74.5) | 23 (73) | 22.2 (72.0) | 23.3 (73.8) |
| Average precipitation mm (inches) | 18 (0.7) | 10 (0.4) | 13 (0.5) | 30 (1.2) | 159 (6.3) | 318 (12.5) | 477 (18.8) | 503 (19.8) | 369 (14.5) | 194 (7.6) | 140 (5.5) | 65 (2.6) | 2,296 (90.4) |
Source: en.climate-data.org

=== Ecology ===
In 2007, ordinary fishing ponds in Tagalag and Coloong were transformed into fishing spots that attract anglers every year for a prize catch. Fish tournaments are held yearly to increase tourism and livelihood in the area.

In 2008, the Supreme Court of the Philippines mandated Regional Trial Court Branch 171 as an environmental court handling all environmental cases in Valenzuela.

Thomas Hodge-Smith noted in 1939 that Valenzuela is rich in black tektites occurring in spheroidal and cylindrical shapes and are free of bubbles.

Flora and fauna

Flora and fauna in Valenzuela include plant and animal species commonly found on Luzon, including domesticated mammals. The Department of Environment and Natural Resources (DENR) declared a 2-hectare (about 4.9 acres) mangrove and swamp area in Villa Encarnacion, Barangay Malanday, as an ecotourism site in recognition of its biodiversity.

The site attracted around 100 species of migratory and resident birds each year. These included the black-crowned night heron (Nycticorax nycticorax), as well as native species such as moorhens (Gallinula sp.), swamphens (Porphyrio sp.), and the Philippine duck (Anas luzonica). Wooden viewing decks were constructed to support birdwatching, monitoring, and counting activities by visitors and researchers.

As of 2020, the ecotourism site at Villa Encarnacion no longer exists. The area was altered by road-side housing construction and other residential developments, which replaced much of the former wetland habitat.

== Government ==
The Valenzuela City Hall Complex in barangay Karuhatan.

=== Local government ===
Like other cities in the Philippines, Valenzuela is governed by a mayor and a vice mayor who are elected to three-year terms. The mayor is the executive head who leads the city's departments in the execution of city ordinances and the delivery of public services. The vice mayor presides over a 14-member legislative council comprising six councilors from each of the city's two districts, plus two ex officio members: the Association of Barangay Chairmen President (representing the barangay sector) and the Sangguniang Kabataan Federation President (representing youth interests). The council is in charge of creating the city's policies in the form of ordinances and resolutions.

The city is geographically part of, but not politically related to, the third district of Metro Manila.

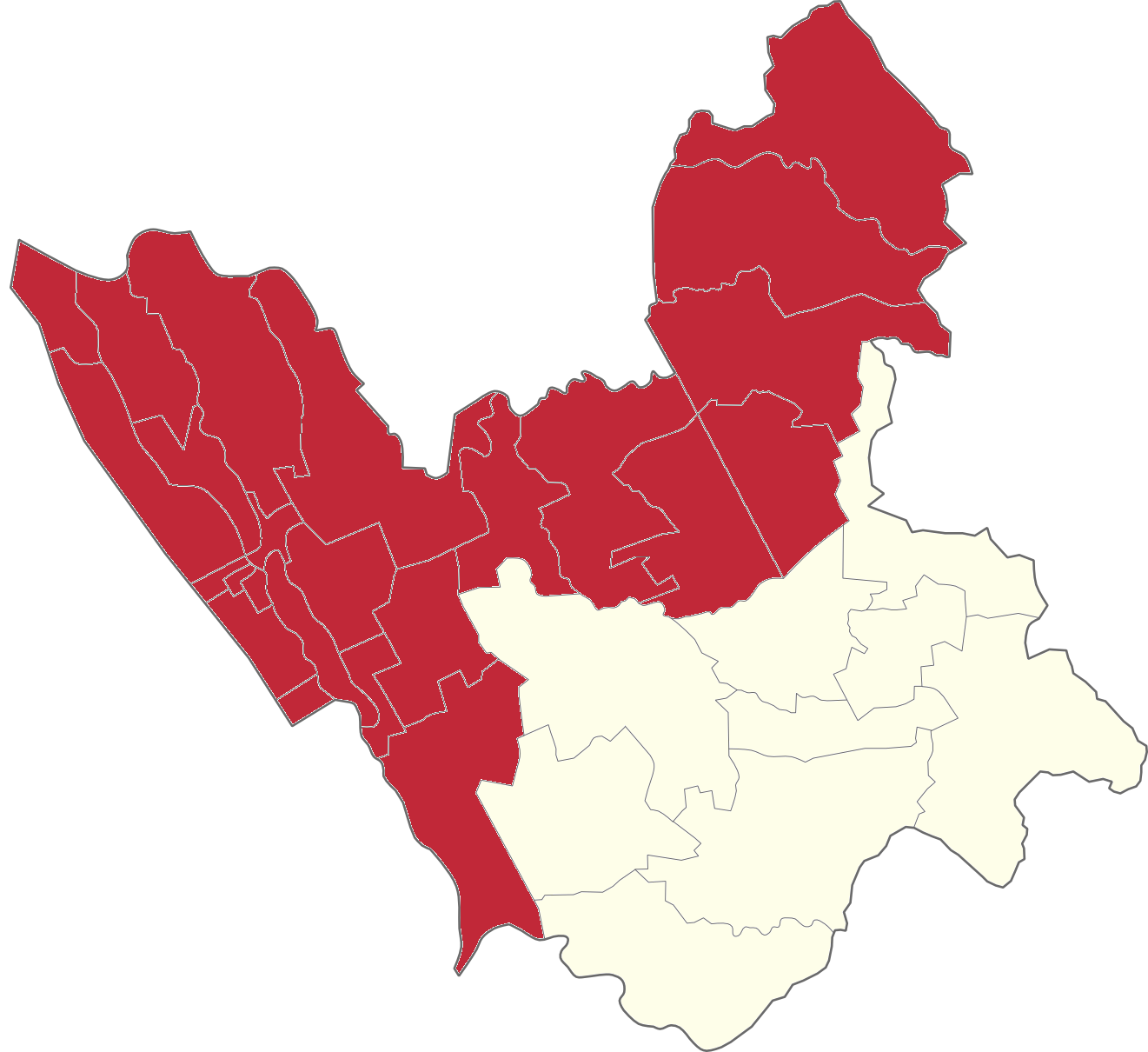
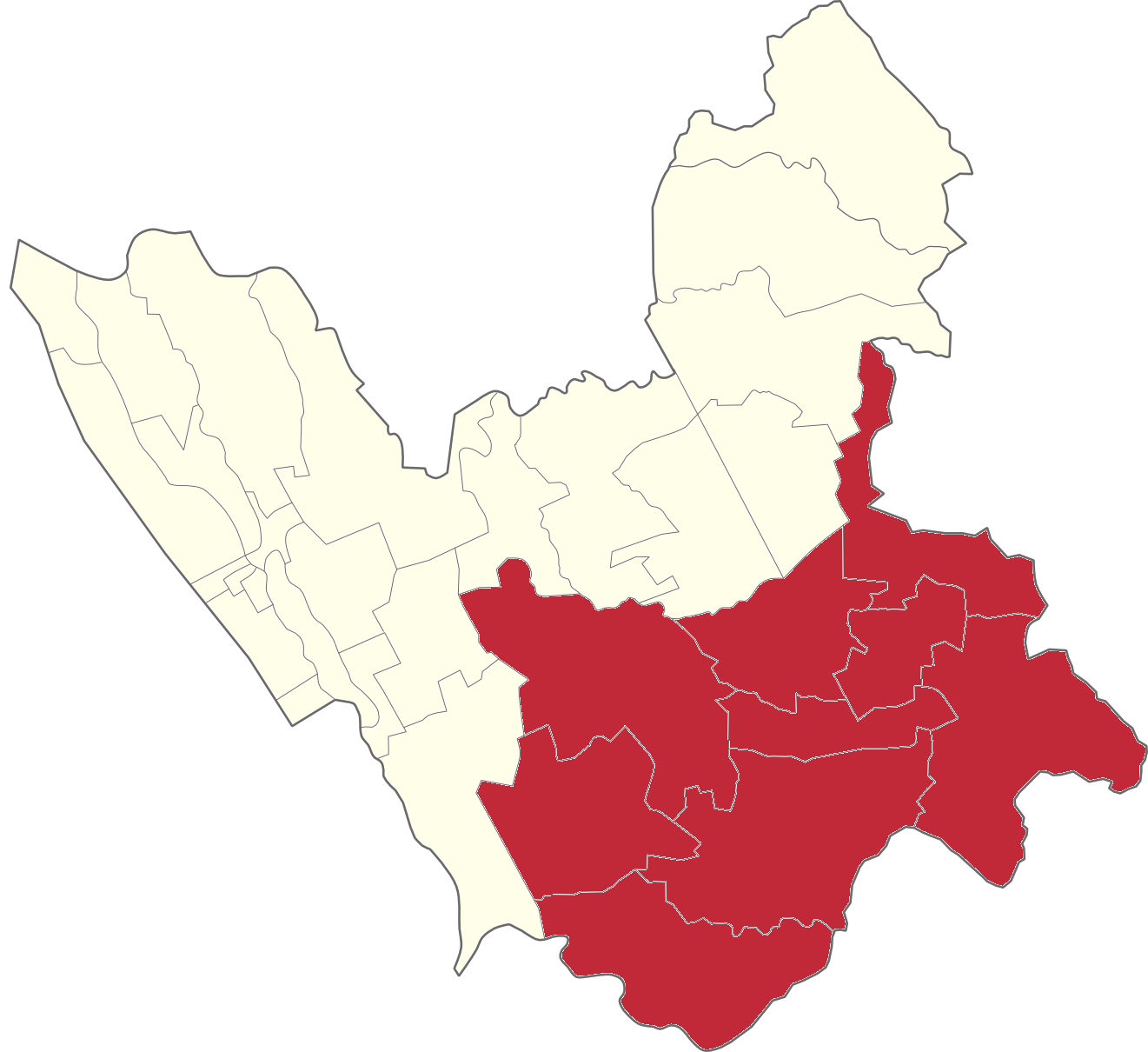
First (left) and second(right) legislative districts of Valenzuela.

=== Elected officials ===
The incumbent mayor and vice mayor of the city are Weslie T. Gatchalian and Marlon Paulo D. Alejandrino, respectively.

Representatives, officials and members of the 10th Valenzuela City Council
| Designation | First district | Second District |
|---|---|---|
| Representatives | Kenneth T. Gatchalian (NPC) | Gerald Cloyd Alexis D.V. Galang (Lakas) |
| Mayor | Weslie T. Gatchalian (NPC) | |
| Vice Mayor | Marlon Paulo D. Alejandrino (NPC) | |
| Councilors | Cristina Marie F. Tan (NUP) | Lorena C. Natividad-Borja (NPC) |
| Councilors | Joseph William D. Lee (NPC) | Niña Sheila B. Lopez (NPC) |
| Councilors | Richard C. Enriquez (Lakas) | Roselle S. Sy (NPC) |
| Councilors | Walter Magnum D. Dela Cruz (NPC) | Chiqui Marie N. Carreon (NPC) |
| Councilors | Kisha Coleen R. Ancheta (NPC) | Christoffer Joseph M. Pineda (NPC) |
| Councilors | Exequil D.J. Serrano (NPC) | Louie P. Nolasco (NPC) |
| ABC President | Mario B. San Andres (Canumay West) | |
| SK President | Jairus Jeofri P. Esplana (Malinta) | |

=== Court system and police ===
The Supreme Court of the Philippines recognizes five regional trial courts, two metropolitan trial courts, and one family court within Valenzuela that have an over-all jurisdiction in the populace of the city.

The Valenzuela City Police Station (VCPS) is one of the four city police stations in the Northern Police District under the jurisdiction of the National Capital Region Police Office. Today, more than 500 police officers are working for the VCPS, which puts the police-residents ratio in the city at 1:16,000.

In 2007, the Valenzuela City Peace and Order Council, of which the VCPS is a member, was hailed 2nd placer for the Best Peace and Order Council award that was conferred by the Department of the Interior and Local Government, the NCRPO, and the Manila Peace and Order Council. In 2012, the VCPS was cited by the NCRPO for having the best Women and Children Protection Desk in the metro.

== Demographics ==
Population census of Valenzuela
| Year | Pop. | ±% p.a. |
|---|---|---|
| 1903 | 8,183 | — |
| 1918 | 9,323 | +0.87% |
| 1939 | 13,468 | +1.77% |
| 1948 | 16,740 | +2.45% |
| 1960 | 41,473 | +7.85% |
| 1970 | 98,456 | +9.02% |
| 1975 | 150,605 | +8.90% |
| 1980 | 212,363 | +7.11% |
| 1990 | 340,227 | +4.83% |
| 1995 | 437,165 | +4.81% |
| 2000 | 485,433 | +2.27% |
| 2007 | 568,928 | +2.21% |
| 2010 | 575,356 | +0.41% |
| 2015 | 620,422 | +1.45% |
| 2020 | 714,978 | +3.03% |
| 2024 | 725,173 | +0.34% |
Source: Philippine Statistics Authority

The demonym of Valenzuela is Valenzuelano for males and Valenzuelana for females; it is sometimes spelled as Valenzuelaño.

Based on the 2024 census, Valenzuela has a total population of 725,173 and remains the 7th most populous in the NCR and 13th in the Philippines. This is an increase from 575,356 people in 2010, at an annual growth rate of 1.45%.

The five most populous barangays are: Gen. T. de Leon (89,441), Marulas (53,978), Malinta (48,397), Ugong (41,821) and Karuhatan (40,996).

Valenzuela City's household population in 2010, on the other hand, is at 574,840. Almost half, 50.2 per cent, are males. Females comprise 49.8 per cent of the population, with a total number of 286,548. The city has a sex ratio of 101 males for every 100 females, the second-highest ratio in the region, after Navotas, which has a sex ratio of 102 males per 100 females. Seven out of ten Valenzuela residents, 66.7 per cent, belong to the working-age group, or those aged 15 to 64. The remaining 33.3% are aged 0 to below 15 and 65 and above, which are classified as the dependent age group.

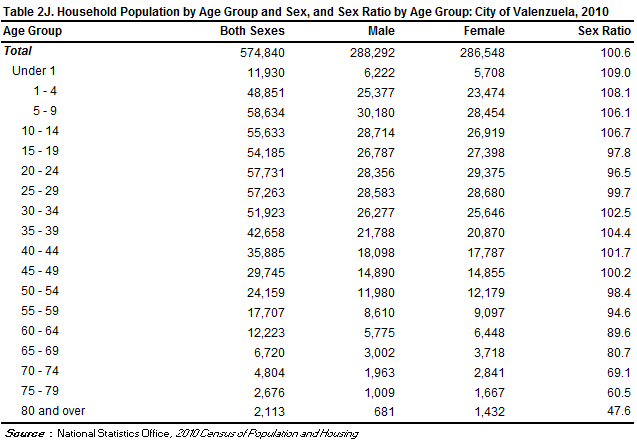
Household population by age group and sex, and sex ratio by age group, City of Valenzuela, 2010

City population is expected to reach the 700,000-mark by mid-2022.

== Culture ==
=== "Himig Valenzuela" ===
Sample audio for "Himig Valenzuela".
"Himig Valenzuela"

"Himig Valenzuela", or "Valenzuela Hymn", is the official song of the city. It is sung during flag ceremonies of private and public schools as well as government institutions along with the Philippine national anthem, "Lupang Hinirang". The hymn was composed by Edwin Ortega, which has the primary objective to promote unity, progress and patriotism among the city's citizens.

City ordinance number 18 mandated all citizens of Valenzuela to sing the hymn in all meetings and public occasions.

Before its adoption in 2008, Valenzuela had its official hymn during its time as a municipality, from being part of Bulacan to Metro Manila, called "Bayang Valenzuela", composed by Igmidio M. Reyes and its lyrics by Dr. Eusebio S. Vibar. It is now abandoned in its use as the official hymn of this city. There is a video by Valenzuela City Cultural and Tourism Development Office, which is found on Facebook.

=== Feasts and holidays ===
In 2007, President Gloria Macapagal Arroyo signed a law declaring February 14 a special non-working holiday each year. The date marks Valenzuela’s recognition as a city in 1998.

The city also observes November 12 as its foundation day. This date refers to the founding of the town when it was still known as Polo in 1623.

Although there has been disagreement about the town’s exact founding date, the National Historical Commission of the Philippines confirmed November 12 as the official date. This follows the Spanish colonial practice of using a town’s patron saint’s feast day as its date of establishment.

Each barangay in Valenzuela has its own feast. Most of them launch celebrations during May and April to honor patron saints and the bountiful harvest. Every April 26, a santacruzan is performed along with the Santa Cruz Festival in Barangay Isla. Honoring St. Helena's legendary discovery of the True Cross according to Christian tradition. St. Helena was the mother of Constantine the Great. According to legends, 300 years after the death of Christ, at the age of 75, she went to Calvary to search for the Cross. After some archeological diggings at the site of the Crucifixion, she unearthed three crosses. She tested each one by making a sick servant lie on all three. The cross where the servant recovered was identified as Christ's. St. Helena's feast day falls on August 8 but the anniversary of the finding of the Cross is on May 3, in the Philippines, this celebration took the form of the Mexican Santa Cruz de Mayo.

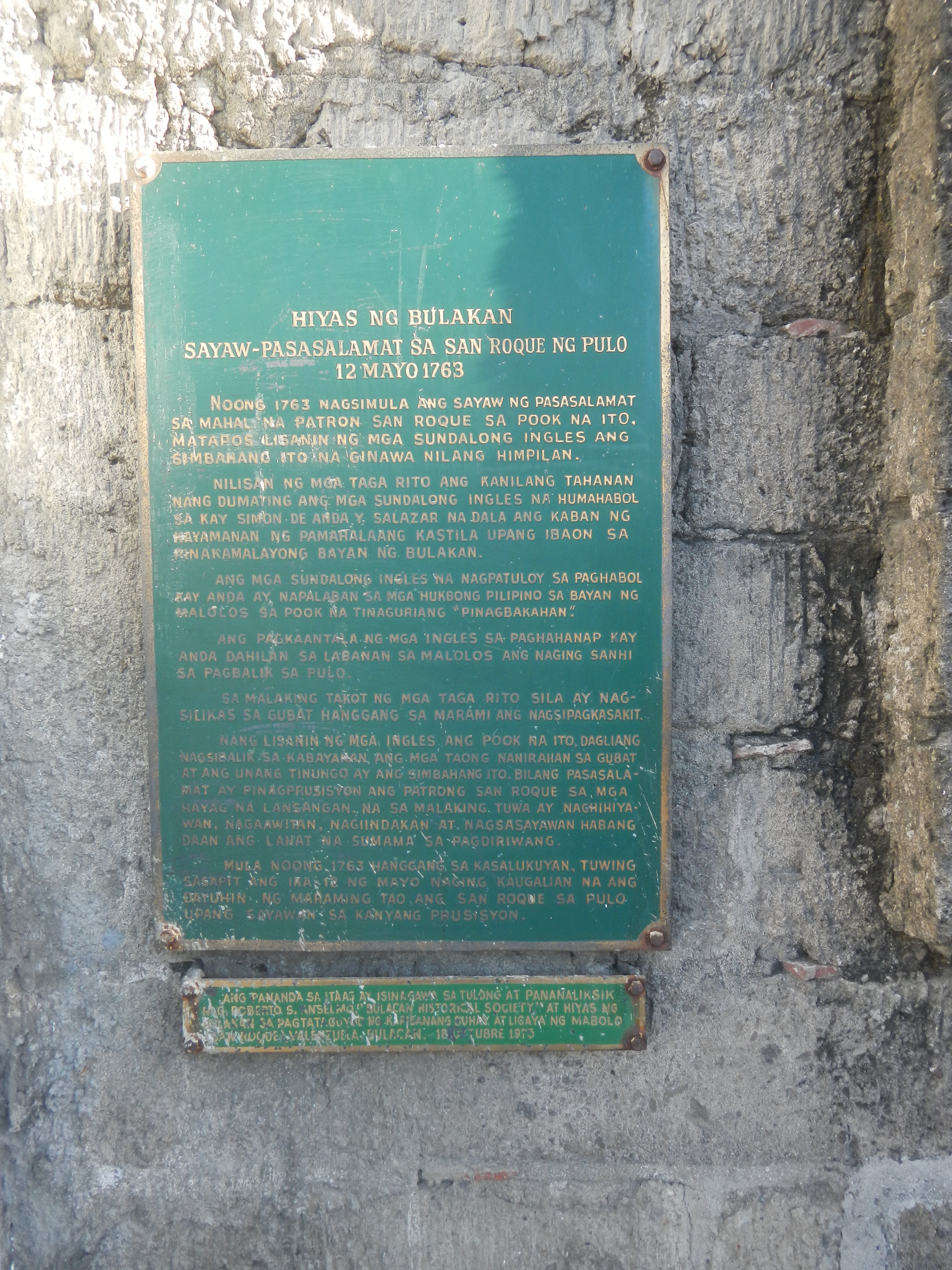
Hiyas ng Bulakan Sayaw-Pasasalamat, 12 Mayo 1763 - San Roque ng Pulo historical marker

Mano Po, San Roque Festival is celebrated every May 12 in Mabolo. In Valenzuela, San Roque is also known as the patron saint of the unmarried. Local tradition surrounding the San Roque Festival includes beliefs about auspicious blessings during the celebrations, although specific claims are anecdotal. The festival is almost similar to Obando Fertility Rites, where hopeful romantics dance to San Roque, requesting to find their true love. Street dancing and procession along the city's major thoroughfares in commemoration of the feast of San Roque, highlighting the customs and traditional celebration of the festival. This also commemorates townsfolk victory after the British departed the country following the end of Seven Years' War with Spain.

== Economy ==
Owing to the cross-migration of people across the country and its location as the northernmost point of Metro Manila, Valenzuela has developed into a multicultural metropolis. A former agricultural rural area, Valenzuela has grown into a major economic and industrial center of the Philippines when a large number of industries relocated to the central parts of the city.

Poverty incidence of Valenzuela (%)

Source: Philippine Statistics Authority

== Tourism ==
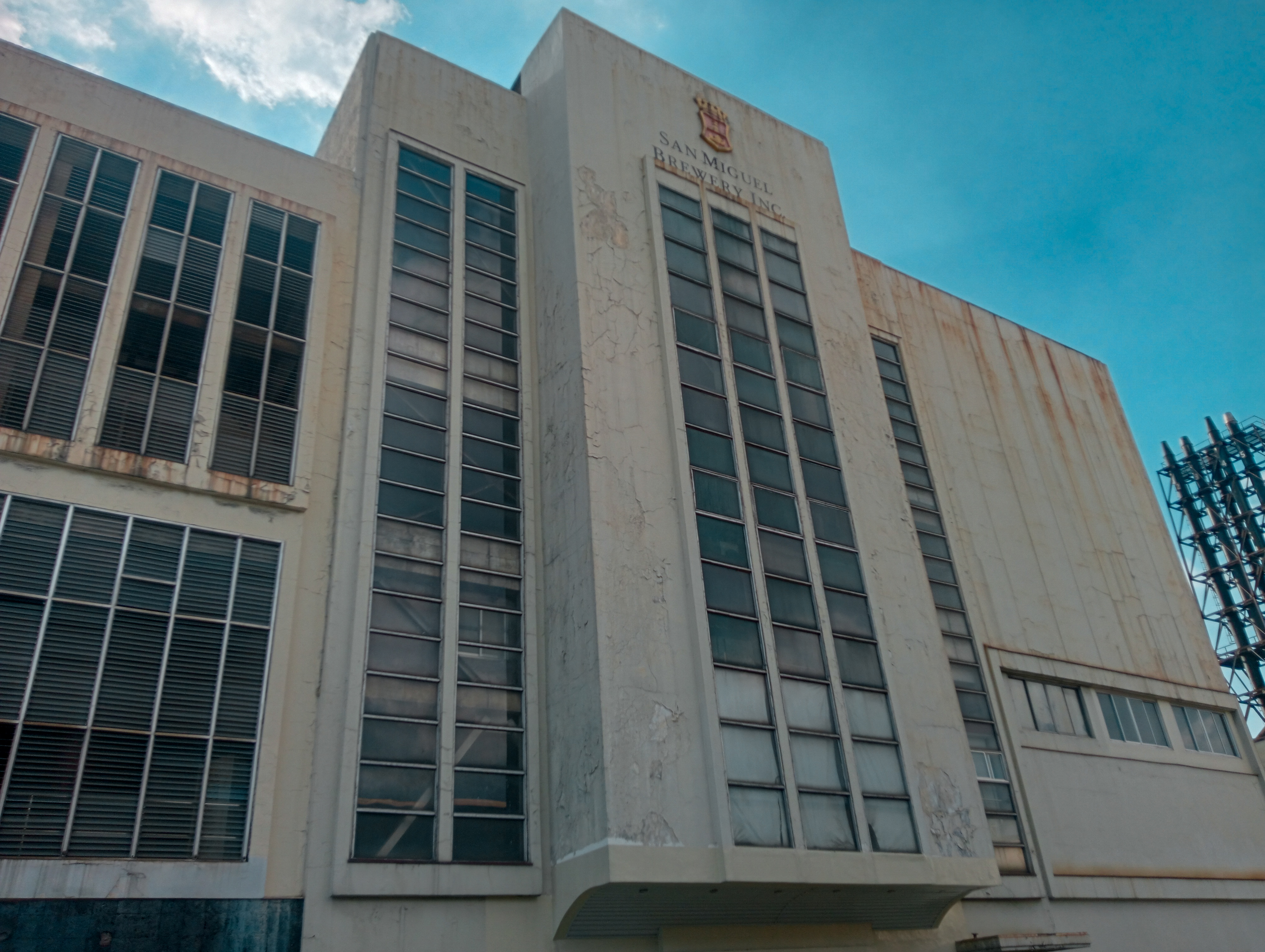
San Miguel Brewery Inc. - Polo Brewery

=== Historical sites ===
Arkong Bato (arch of stone) was constructed and built by the American colonial government in 1910 to serve as a border between the provinces of Bulacan and Rizal. After both Malabon and Valenzuela were incorporated into Metropolitan Manila in 1975, the arch became the boundary between the two towns and their respective barangays: Barangay Santulan in Malabon and Barangay Arkong Bato in Valenzuela.

The Harry C. Egbert Memorial in Malinta serves as a memorial to Brigadier general Harry Clay Egbert, commanding officer of the 22nd Infantry Regiment of the United States, who was mortally wounded in 1899 during the Philippine–American War.

The Museo Valenzuela is a museum dedicated to the history of the city and the life of Pío Valenzuela, after whom the old town of Polo is named.

The Japanese Cemetery (Filipino: Libingan ng mga Hapon) was established on a 500-square-meter lot within the Bureau of Telecommunications compound. The cemetery served as the burial site for thousands of Japanese soldiers who died during the Philippines Campaign of 1944–45.

=== Residence of Pío Valenzuela ===
Pío Valenzuela, a member of the Katipunan triumvirate and founder of its newspaper Ang Kalayaan, lived in a residence along Velilla Street in Barangay Pariancillo Villa until his death in 1956. A historical marker placed by the Valenzuela government marks the site. The current building was constructed after World War II on the site of the original residence, which had served as a venue for secret gatherings of the Katipunan before burning down during the war.

=== National Shrine of Our Lady of Fatima ===
The National Shrine of Our Lady of Fatima (Filipino: Pambansang Dambana ng Birhen ng Fatima) is the center of the Fatima apostolate in the Philippines. The church was declared a tourist site in 1982 by the Department of Tourism, and was named a pilgrimage shrine in 2009 by the Diocese of Malolos. It is located near the Our Lady of Fatima University.

The shrine houses a wooden statue of Our Lady of Fatima, one of fifty images blessed by Pope Paul VI in 1967 to commemorate the golden jubilee of the Marian apparitions in Fátima, Portugal. The statues were distributed to churches worldwide, however the statue designated for the Philippines went unclaimed and remained in New Jersey. In 1984, Cardinal Jaime Sin, Archbishop of Manila, claimed the statue which was then transferred under the custody of the Bahay Maria Foundation. During the People Power Revolution in 1986, it was one of the religious figures carried by revolutionaries who opposed President Ferdinand Marcos. On October 17, 1999, the statue was transferred to the shrine. The feast of Our Lady of Fatima is celebrated annually on March 7 and May 13.

=== Churches ===
The San Diego de Alcala Church and its belfry were built in 1632 by the people of Polo. The church was built through the forced labour of residents after the town gained its independence through the efforts of Father Juan Taranco and Don Juan Monsod. Much of the building was destroyed by bombs during the Japanese occupation; the belfry and entrance arch, which are more than 400 years old, are the only parts of the original structure that remain. Residents of Barangay Polo and Barangay Poblacion celebrate the feast day of San Diego de Alcala each year on November 12 in conjunction with the putong polo festival.

The Hearts of Jesus and Mary Parish Church in Malanday was erected on October 17, 1994. It replaced the Santo Cristo Chapel and was solemnly declared on June 24, 2001. The church belongs to the Vicariate of St. Didacus of Alcala – Valenzuela City, Roman Catholic Diocese of Malolos.

=== Parks and recreation ===
The Valenzuela City People's Park, or simply People's Park, is a 1.5 hectare urban park located in Karuhatan beside city hall. The park houses a 400-seat amphitheater that has hosted a wide range of events.

The Valenzuela City Family Park, also located in Karuhatan, is another public park in the area that integrates nature in the urban setting. The park features a variety of amenities including a playground, an aviary, and an amphitheater.

Polo Mini Park opened on January 21, 2020, following the rehabilitation of the historical town square. The park contains a fountain, a memorial marker commemorating war veterans, and statues of Pío Valenzuela and José Rizal.

The Valenzuela Astrodome is a multipurpose indoor stadium in Dalandanan that hosts sporting events, concerts, and exhibitions.

The Tagalag Fishing Village is located in Tagalag which offers facilities for recreational fishing, boating, and birdwatching. The village is located next to the Valenzuela Boardwalk, a 1.3-kilometer pedestrian walkway and bike lane that was created through the redevelopment of a flood dike. The adjacent flood wall includes a four-meter-wide linear park extending through the barangays of Coloong, Tagalag, and Wawang Polo. The boardwalk opened in September 2024.

Gallery of tourist spots in Valenzuela
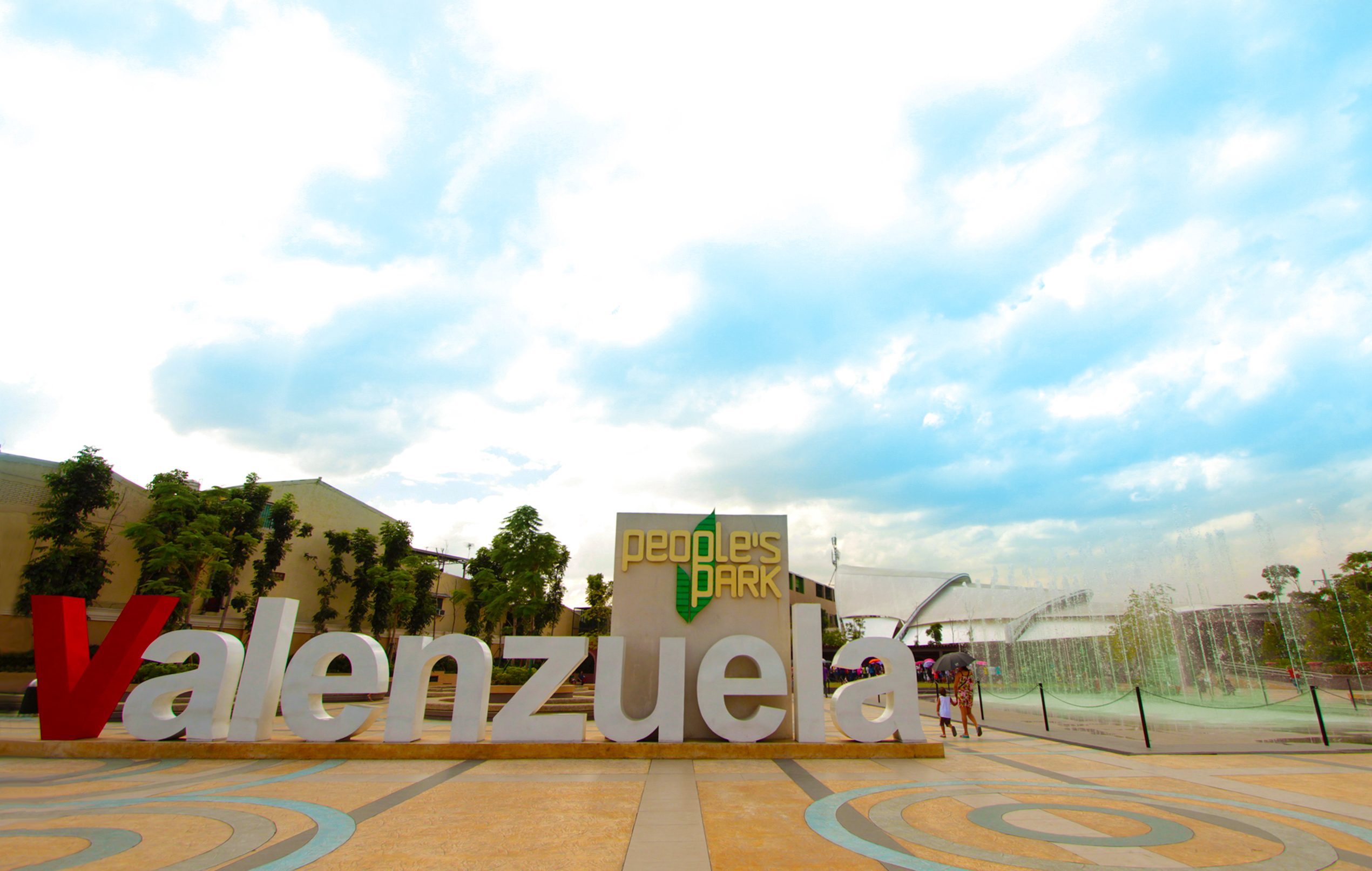
Valenzuela People's Park

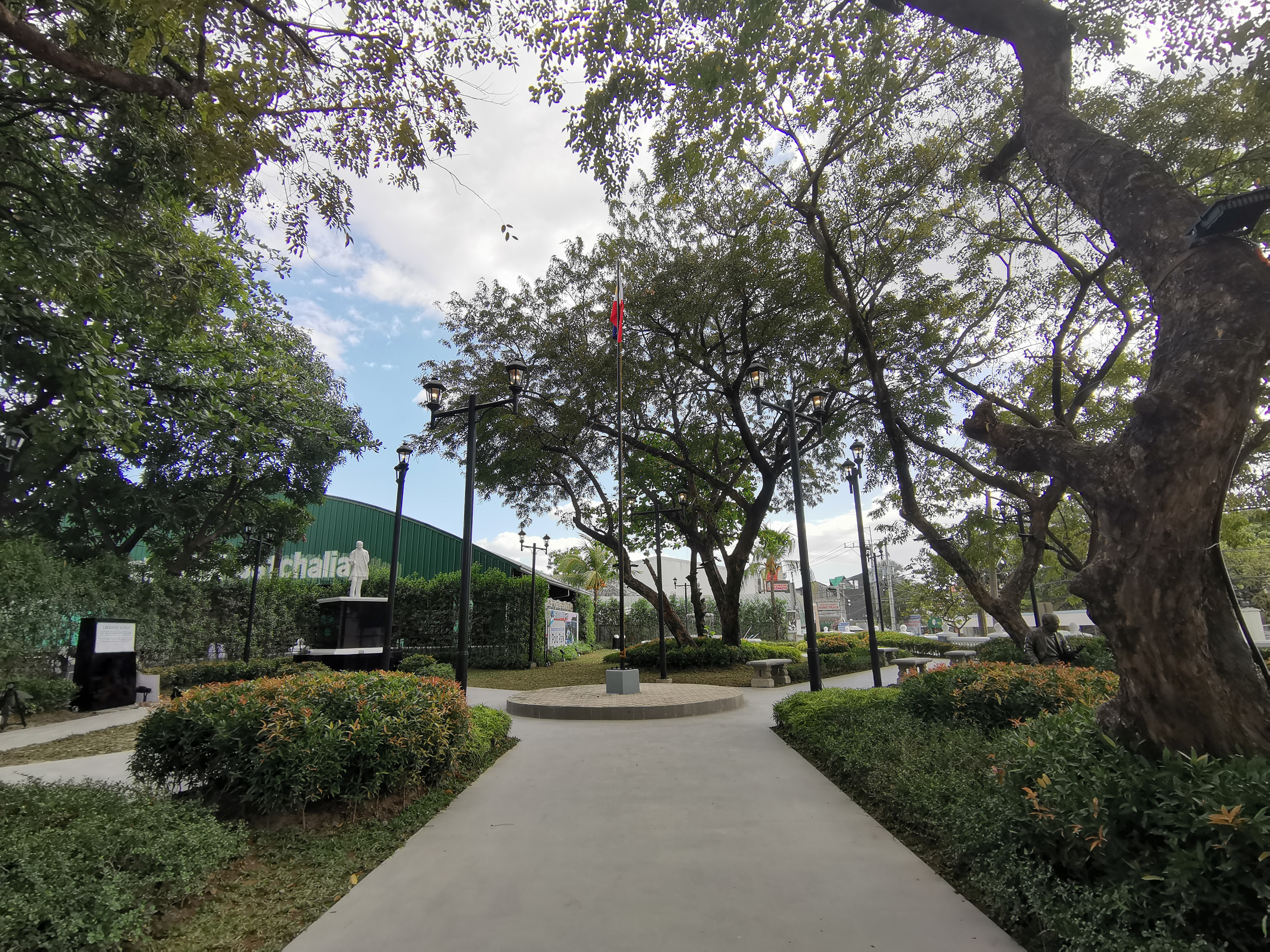
Polo Mini Park

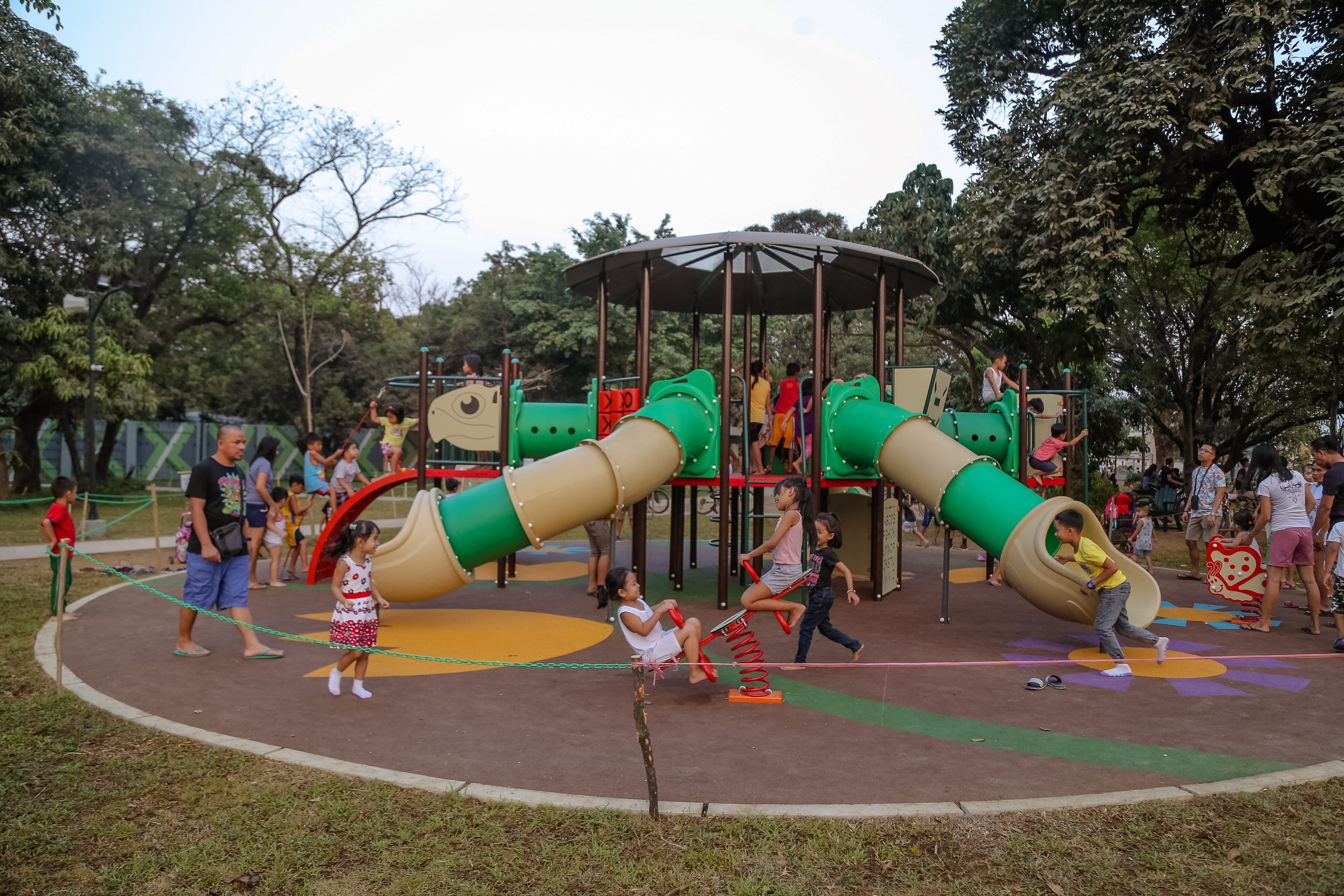
Valenzuela Family Park

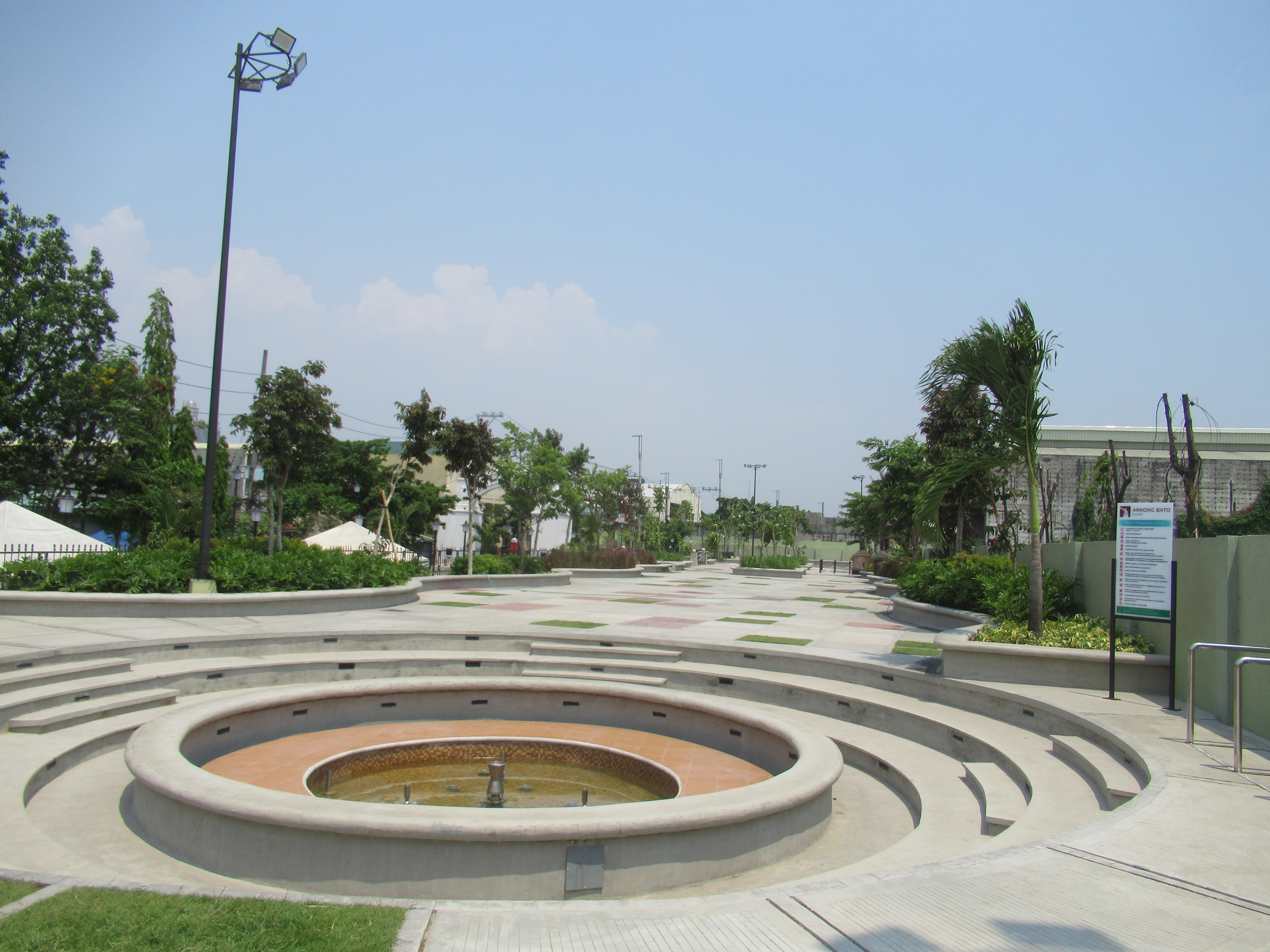
Arkong Bato Park

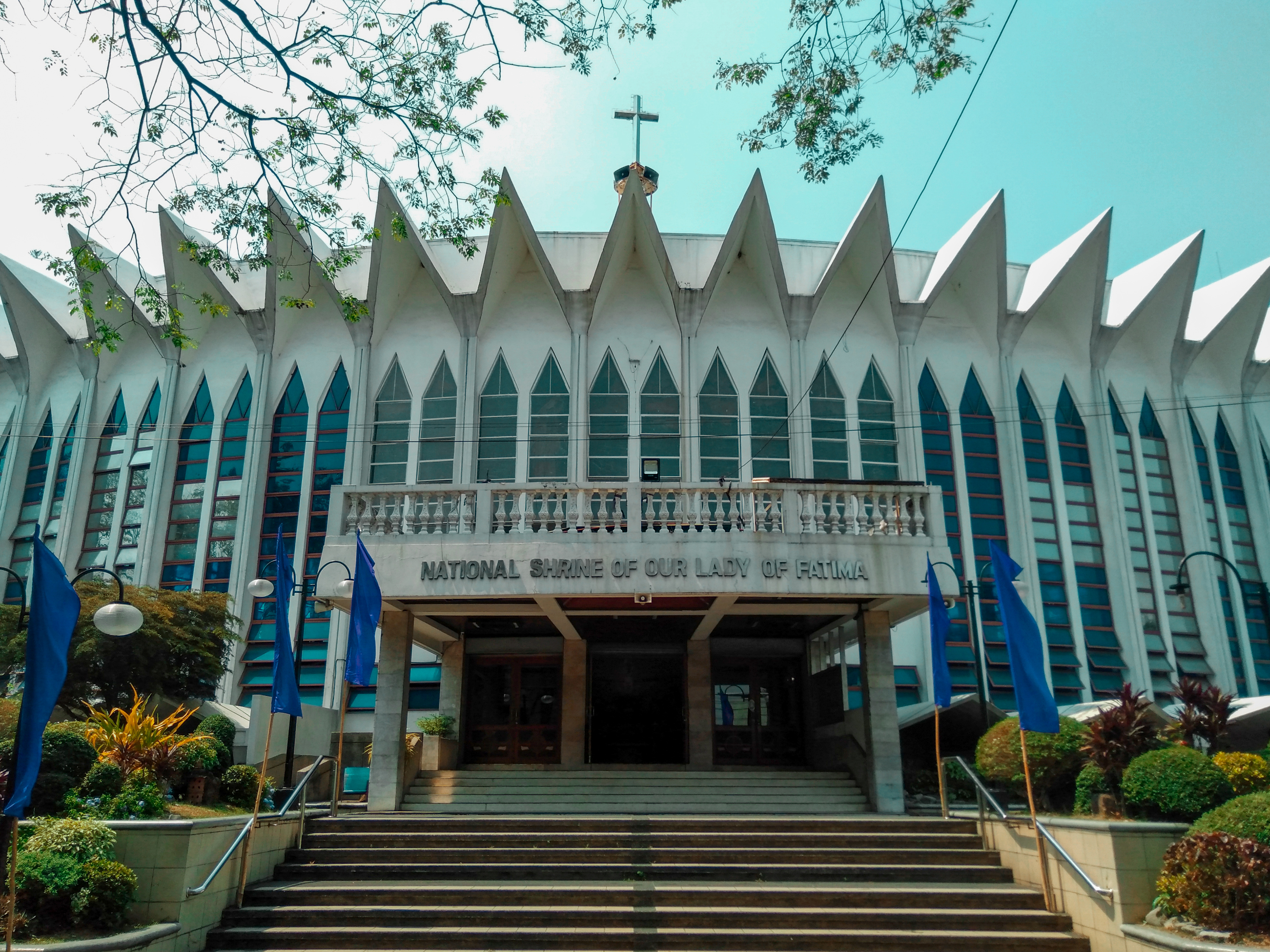
National Shrine of Our Lady of Fatima

San Diego de Alcala Church

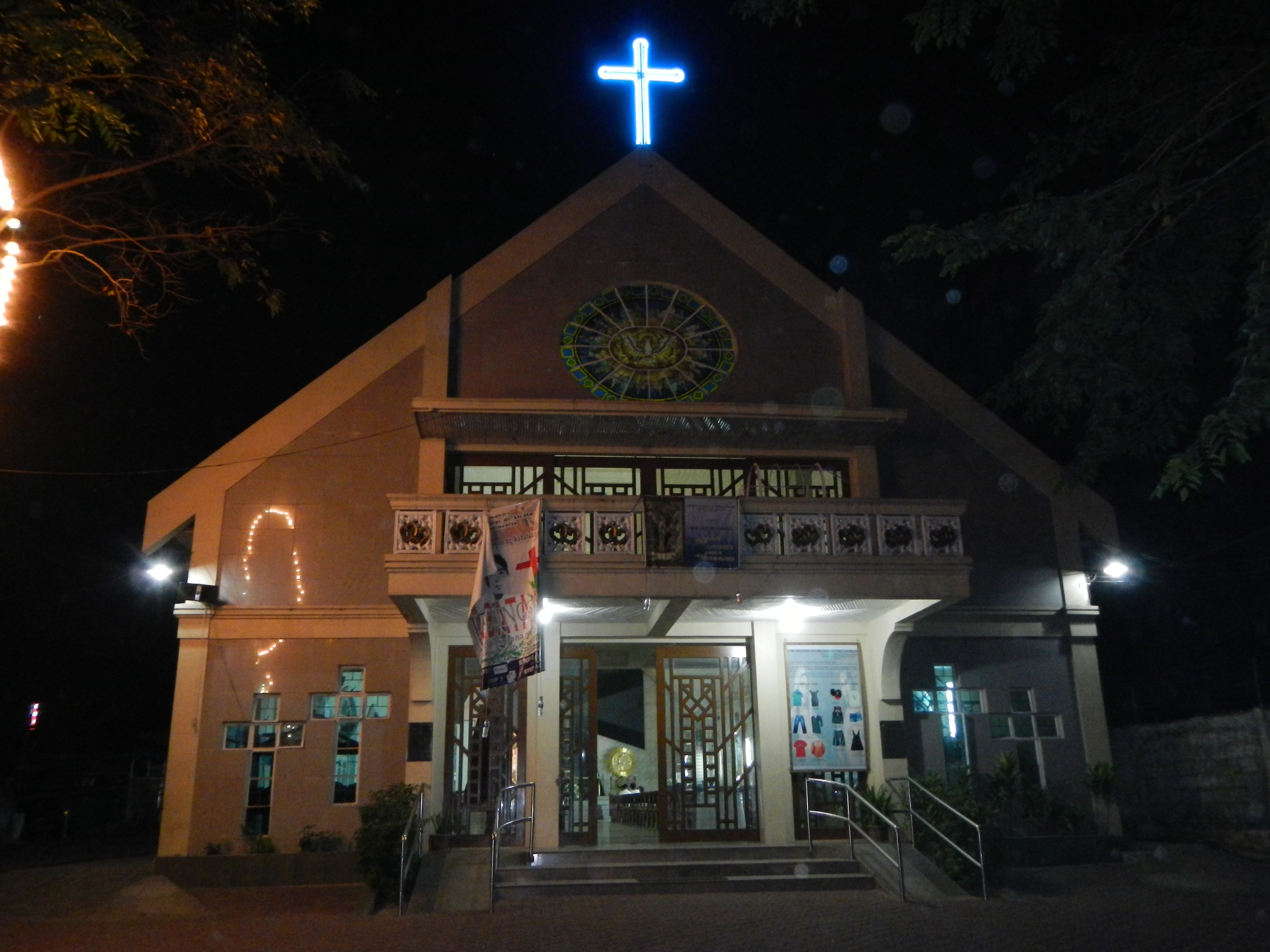
Hearts of Jesus and Mary Parish Church

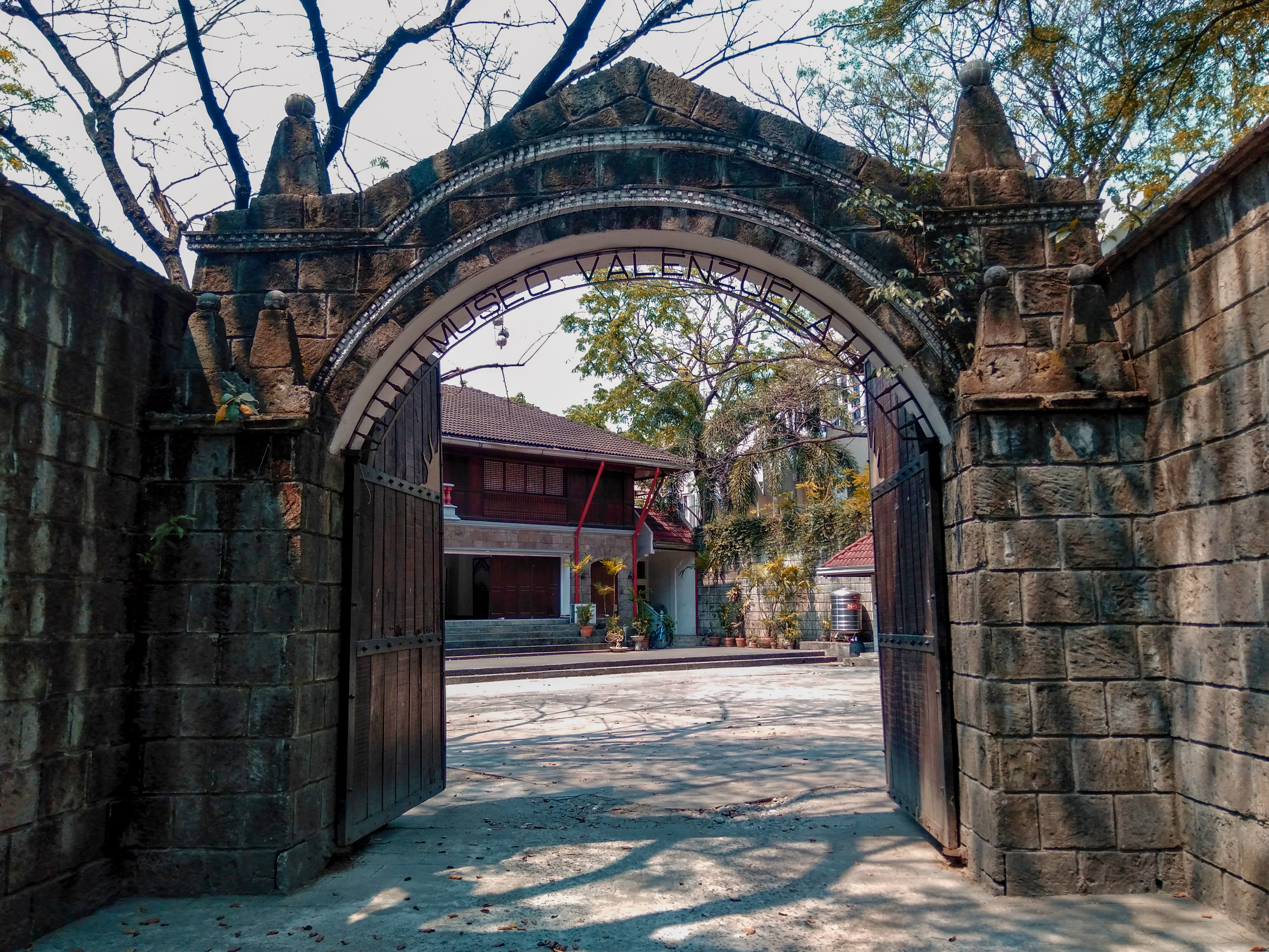
Museo Valenzuela

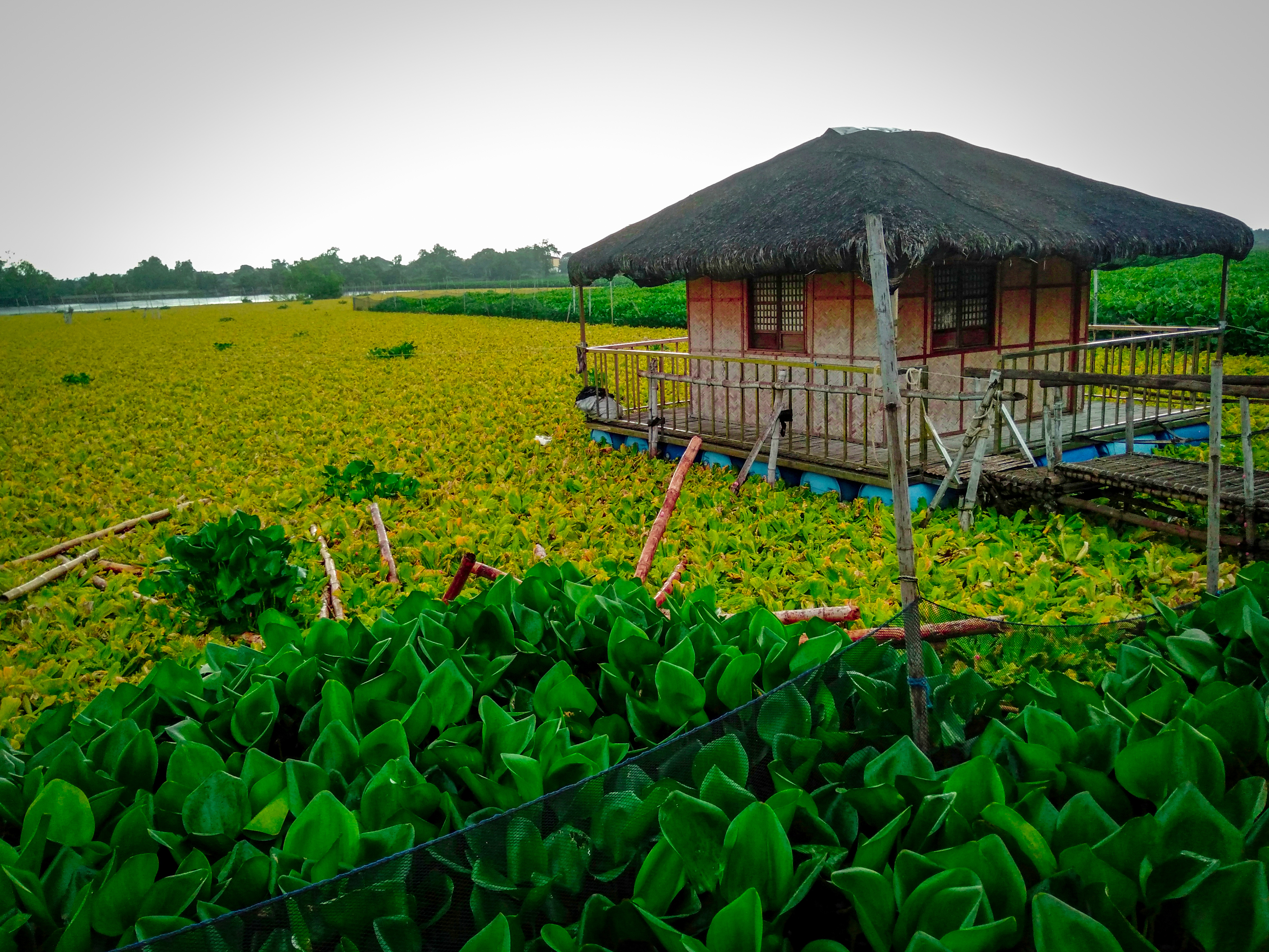
Tagalag Fishing Village

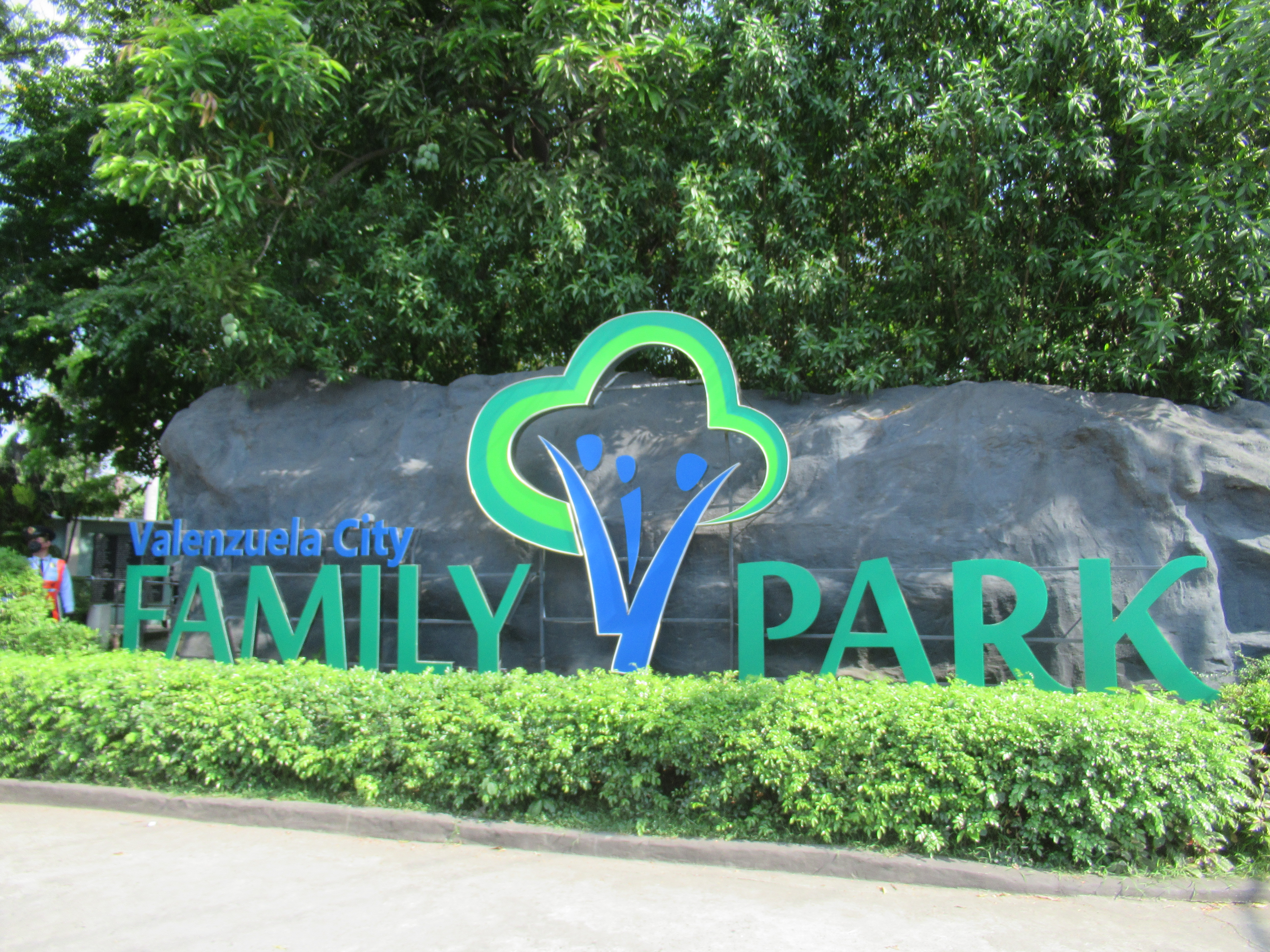
Valenzuela Family Park

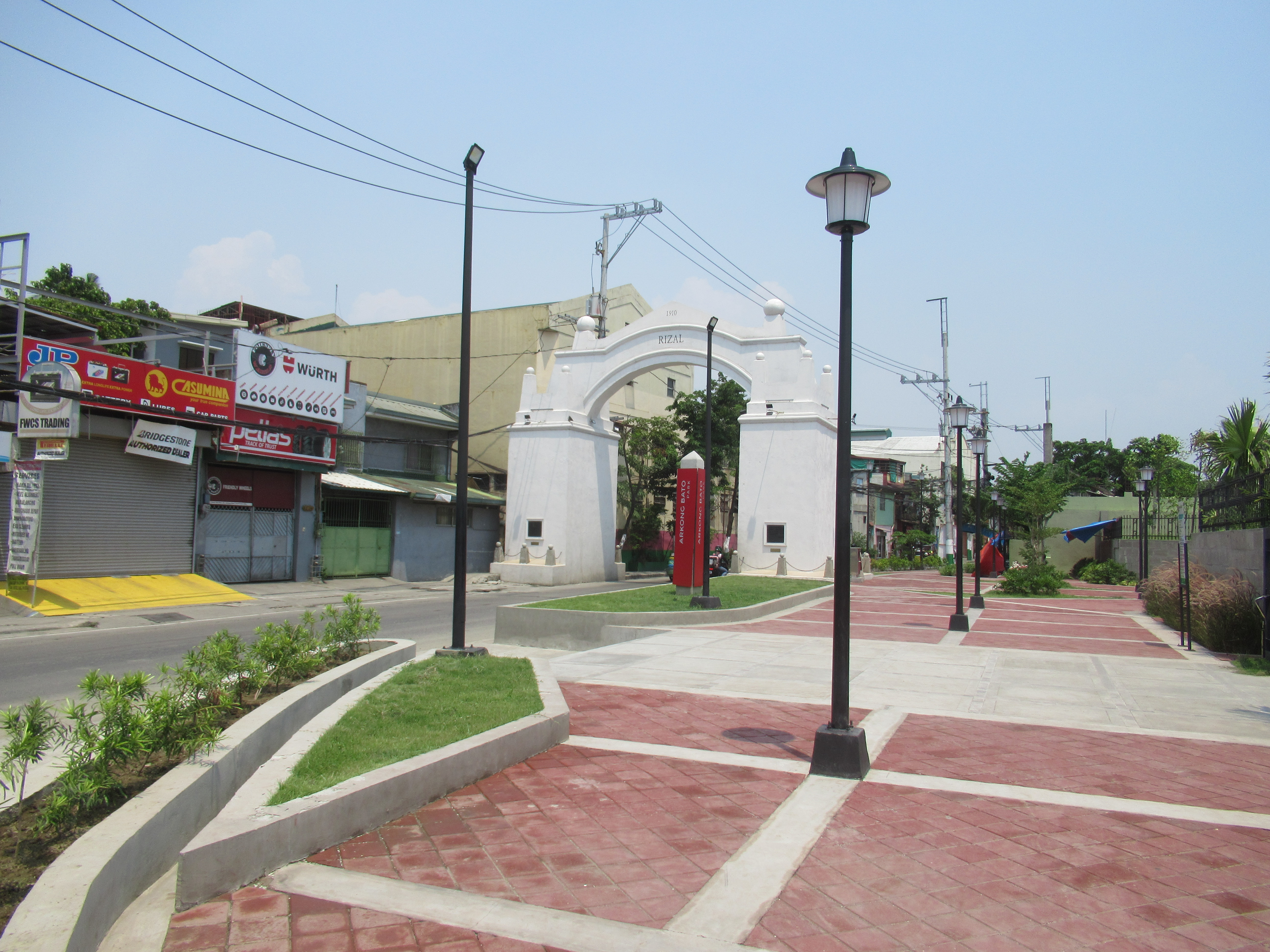
Arkong Bato Monument and Park

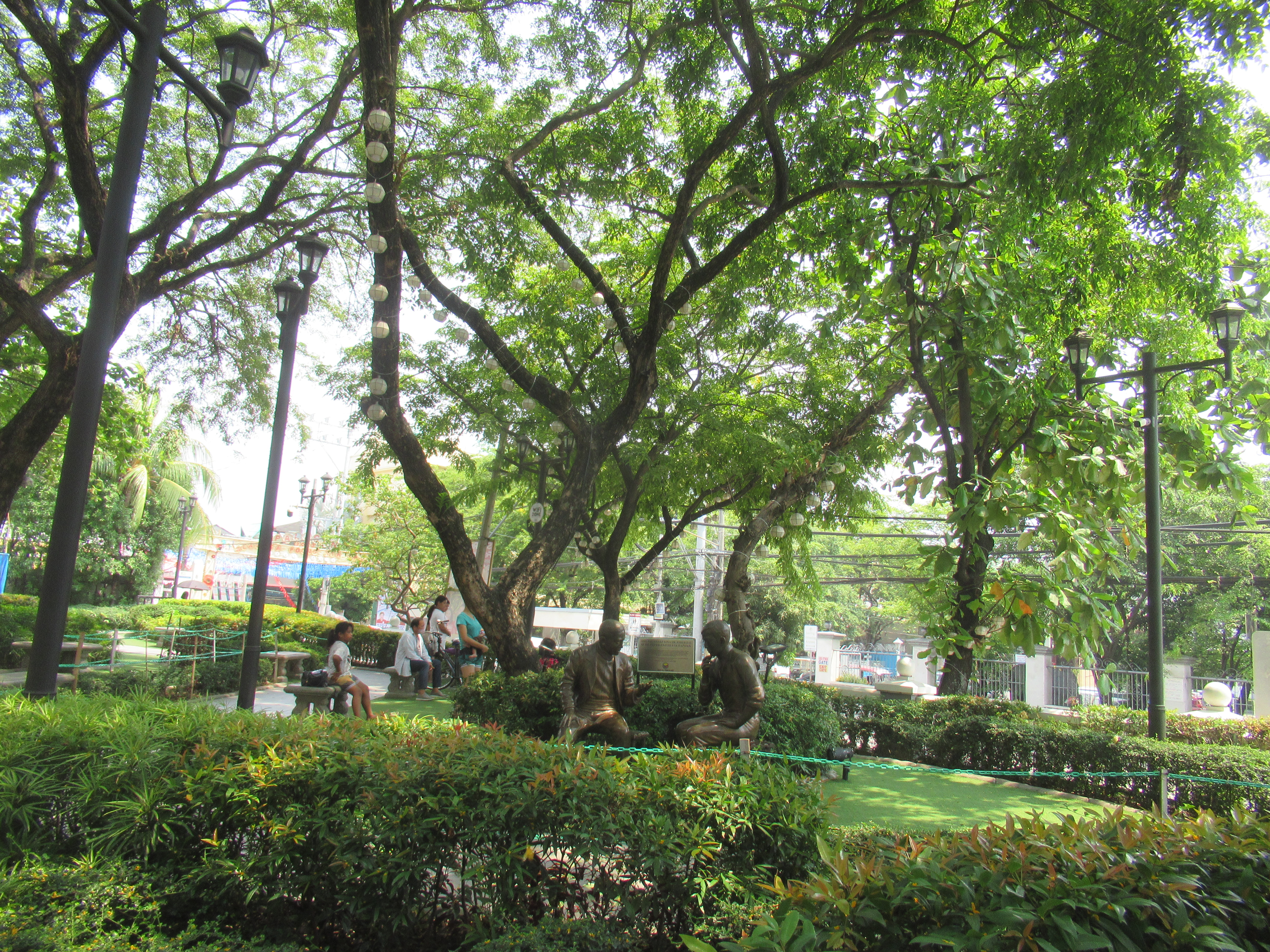
Polo Park Valenzuela

== Services ==
=== Education ===
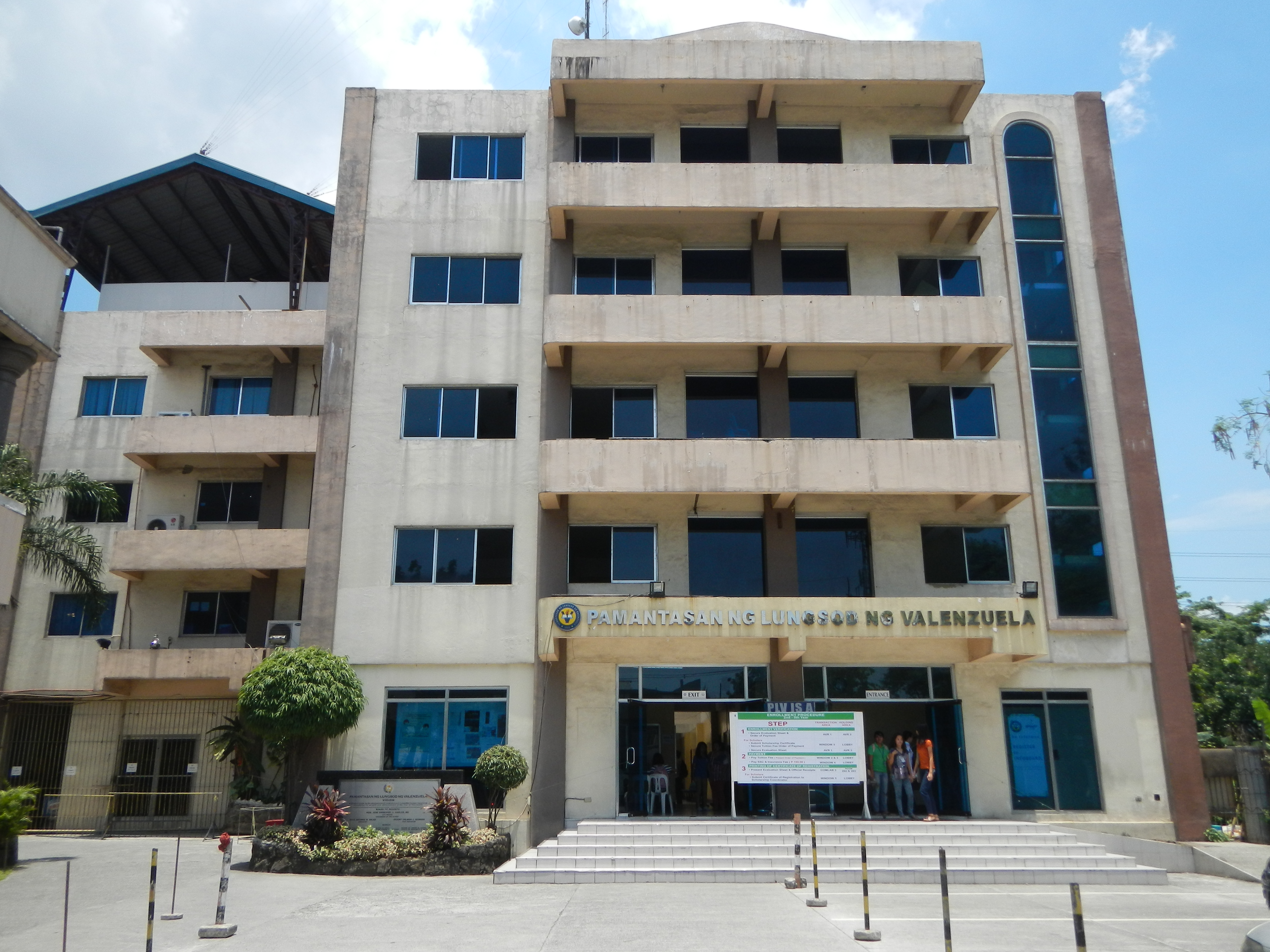
Pamantasan ng Lungsod ng Valenzuela main building in Malinta.

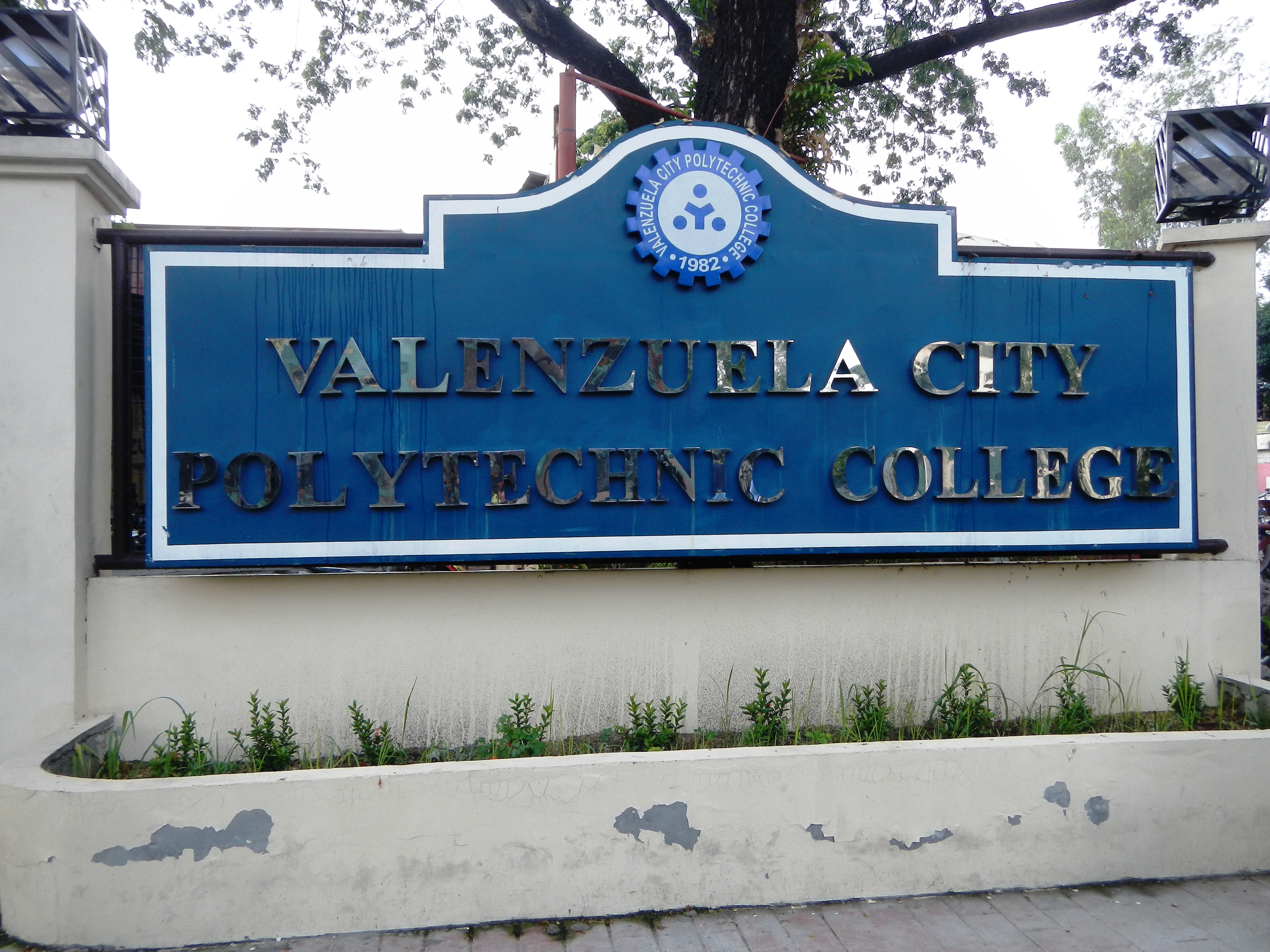
Valenzuela City Polytechnic College entry marker in Parada.

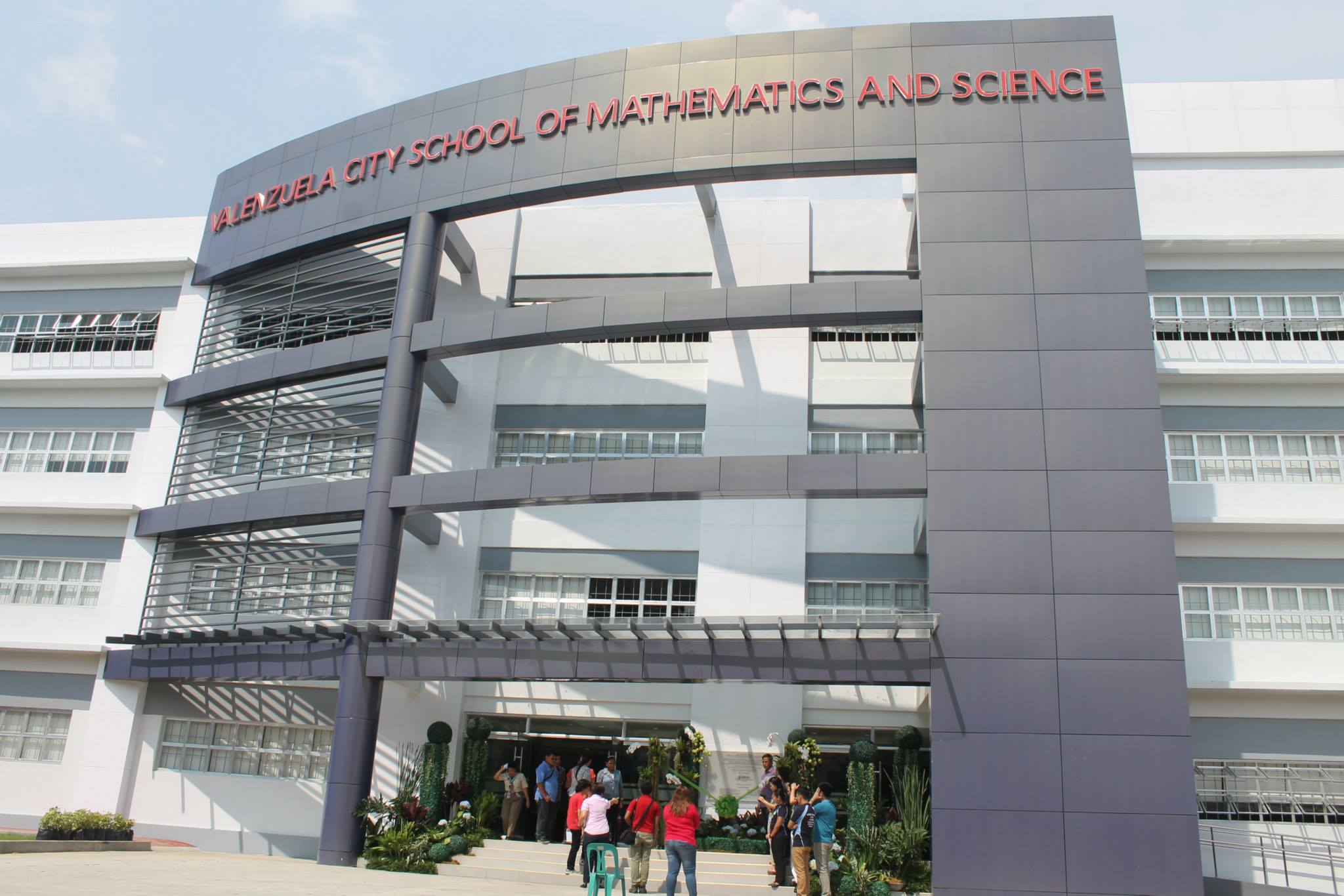
The Valenzuela City School of Mathematics and Science in 2014.

The city collaborates with other institutions, government or private, to bring quality education among its citizens under the "WIN ang Edukasyon Program" (roughly means Education WIN sic Program; WIN is the nickname of the mayor of Valenzuela from 2004 to 2013, Sherwin Gatchalian). In 2010, the government, in partnership with the local school board, funded the purchase to construct a computer laboratory in 10 different secondary schools, all having a net worth of ₱17.7M (or about US$410,000 as of April 2011). This also includes the distribution of ₱1.46M (or about US$34,000 as of April 2011) computers in Pamantasan ng Lungsod ng Valenzuela and Valenzuela City Polytechnic College, as part of Department of Education's ICT4E Strategic Plan. In this project, information and communication technology education is extended and expanded among all students. In 2009, the City Engineering Office repaired sidewalks and drainage to assist students especially during the wet season; they also repaired and constructed new buildings and classrooms to some schools in the city. Under the same program, elementary school students received free mathematics and English workbooks published by the government especially designed for Valenzuelanos. The steady increase of 3.4% enrollment rate each year forces the government to construct new buildings and classrooms to meet the target 1:45 teacher-to-student ratio, contrary to the current count of 1:50 ratio alternating in three shifts. WIN ang Edukasyon Program was done in partnership with the Synergeia Foundation, a non-government organization that aims to improve education in local governments in the Philippines.

At the same time, WIN ang Edukasyon Program also spearheads the yearly training of some mathematics and English language teachers assigned to Grades 1 and 2 pupils. The seminar focuses on how to enhance reading skills, language proficiency and mathematics of the students they are teaching through re-acquaintance with various drills and activities. This was done with the efforts of lecturers from Ateneo de Manila University and Bulacan State University using the approach developed by the UP Diliman's College of Education.

The government owns Pamantasan ng Lungsod ng Valenzuela and Valenzuela City Polytechnic College that serve as the city's state university and technical school for residents and non-residents, respectively. The Pamantasan ng Lungsod ng Valenzuela (PLV) or University of the City of Valenzuela, was established in 2002 and is located within the perimeters of the old city hall in barangay Poblacion. In 2009, the city council passed Resolution No. 194 series of 2008, which authorized the government to purchase lots costing 33M Philippine pesos (or about US$750,000 as of April 2011) in nearby Children of Mary Immaculate College as part of the university's expansion. Mayor Sherwin Gatchalian assisted the development, which has an over-all cost of ₱75M (or about US$1.7M as of April 2011) loaned from Development Bank of the Philippines. The newly purchased lots are used to construct an annex building which will house the departments of business administration and accountancy. The Board of Regents expected an increase in enrollment from 800 to 3,000 students in the next few years.

Valenzuela City Polytechnic College (VCPC) was allotted with additional ₱18M (or about US$420,000 as of April 2011) budget in 2009 from the city fund, which will be used for expansion and upgrade of the college.

There are also privately owned academic institutions, including the Our Lady of Fatima University (OLFU). OLFU was previously granted by Commission on Higher Education autonomy, which includes independence from monitoring and evaluation services by the Commission, though still entitled to subsidies and other financial grants from the national government whenever possible. The autonomous status of the university was approved on March 11, 2009, and expired last March 30, 2014.

=== Healthcare ===
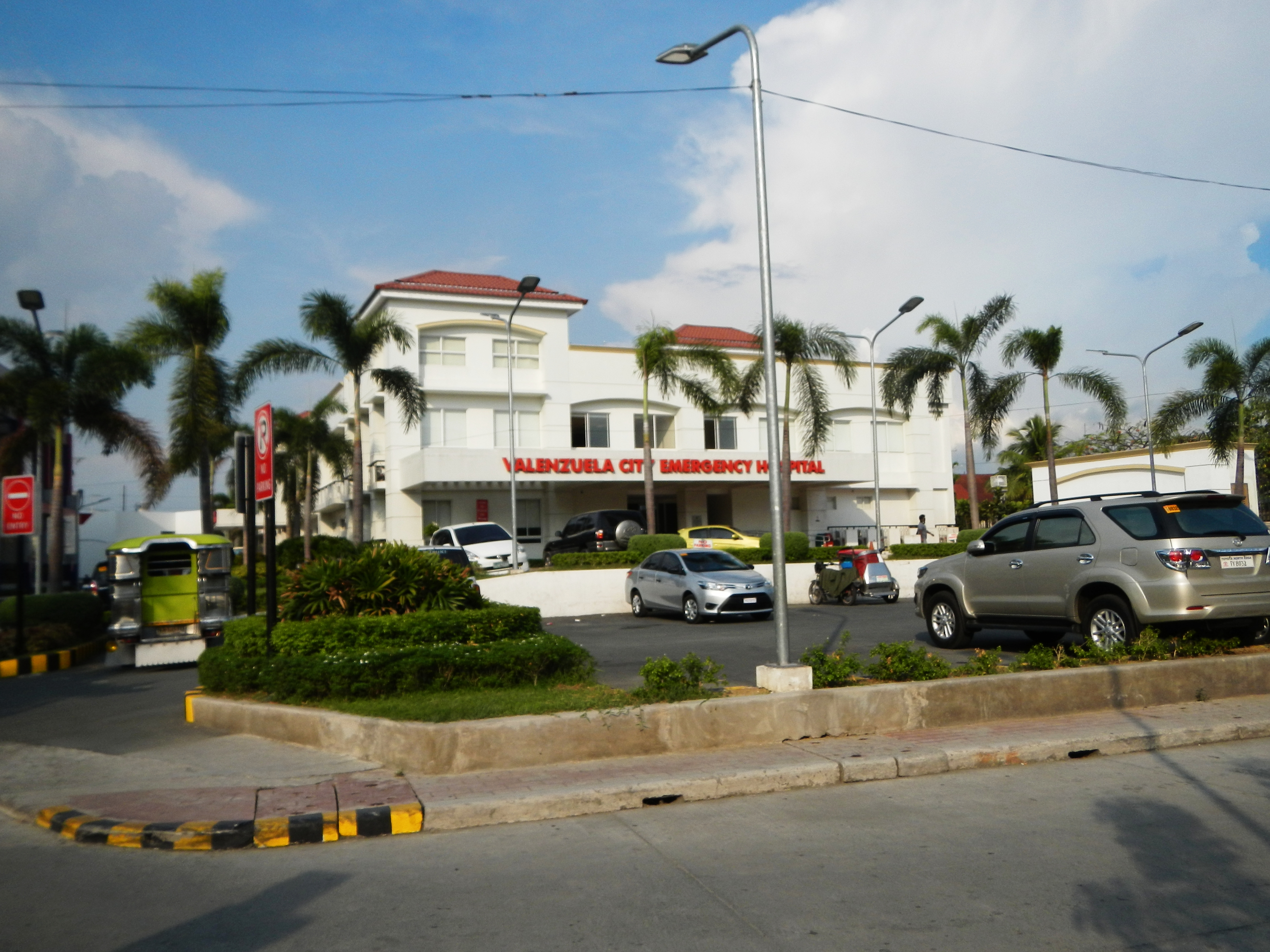
Valenzuela City Emergency Hospital in Dalandanan.

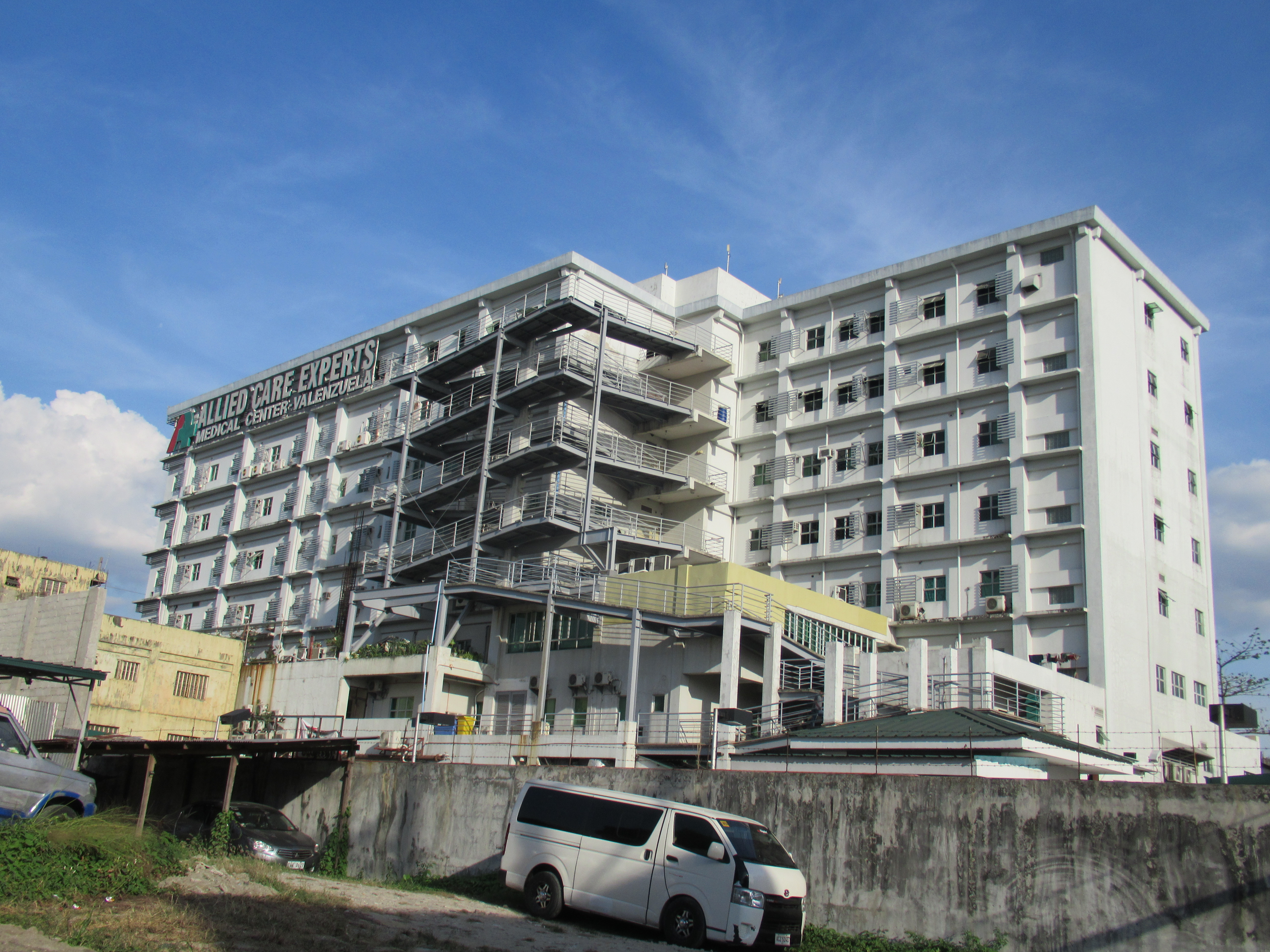
ACE Valenzuela

There are numerous hospitals in Valenzuela, like the city-run Valenzuela City Emergency Hospital and the Valenzuela Medical Center. There are also privately owned hospitals like Calalang General Hospital, Sanctissimo Rosario General Hospital and Fatima University Medical Center, a tertiary private hospital under the administration of Our Lady of Fatima University. The soon-to-rise Valenzuela City West Emergency Hospital and Dialysis Center is located in barangay Dalandanan, adjacent to Valenzuela City Astrodome and Dalandanan National High School. It will render adequate healthcare services to underprivileged residents at a minimal fee.

The city implements the VC Cares Program which is designed for individuals who are unable to provide healthcare and necessities for themselves or meet special emergencies of need. While health care service and financial assistance are generally the forms of assistance given, these may be supplemented by other forms of assistance, as well as problem-solving and referral services. Appropriate referrals may be made to other agencies or institutions where complementary services may be obtained.

According to the 2002 Commission on Audit, the city reported accomplishment per health center ranging from as low as 42.26% to as high as 206% and vaccine utilization of 33% to 90% compared to the normal 46% to 377% per basic requirements.

There are swampy areas in Valenzuela, and there are stagnant waters in the Tullahan River on the south, which make citizens vulnerable to mosquito-linked diseases such as dengue and malaria. Though malaria is not a common case in Valenzuela, the city ranks consistently among the top five dengue-infected regions in the Philippines, with around a 56% chance of recurrence every year. In the second quarter of 2008, however, only 500% increase was reported compared to the same period in 2007.

In September 2009, the Department of Health distributed free Olyset anti-dengue nets treated with permethrin insecticide to Gen. T. de Leon High School. Over 150 rolls of the nets were given and installed in the windows of the said school, as part of DOH's "Dalaw sa Barangay: Aksyon Kontra Dengue" (Visit Barangay: Action against Dengue) campaign.

==== Legal issues ====
In April 2024, Wilbert T. Lee filed House Resolution No. 1674 to investigate the reported complaints against Allied Care Experts Medical Center - Malanday, Valenzuela. Richel Mae Pepito Alvaro, 26, and Lovery Magtangob, 28, "palit-ulo" scheme victims, filed complaints of serious and slight illegal detention with the Valenzuela City Prosecutor's Office against the hospital and several of its staff over unsettled hospital bills amounting to P518,519 and P777,378, respectively. "For Case No. 1, a slight illegal detention charge was filed. For Case No. 2, the victim was detained for three days so it will fall under serious illegal detention," Wes Gatchalian said.

=== Shopping centers and utilities ===
SM City Valenzuela

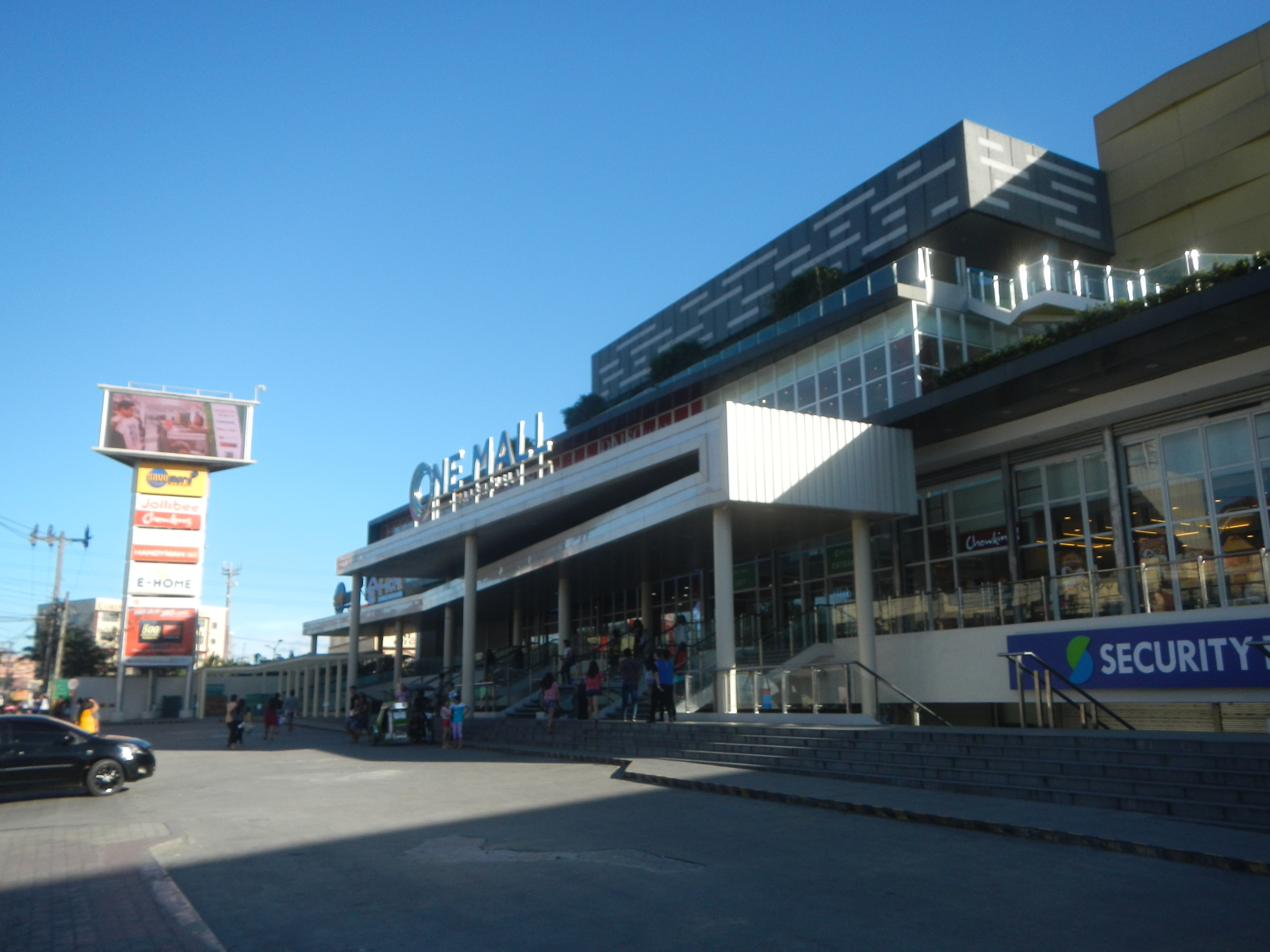
One Mall Valenzuela in Barangay Gen. T. de Leon

On October 28, 2005, SM Supercenter Valenzuela (now SM City Valenzuela) was inaugurated. Other shopping sites such as Puregold Valenzuela, the newly renovated South Supermarket and the newly opened Puregold Paso de Blas is also located in the city. All these stores compete against each other since most have the same product offerings as diversified groceries except for SM City Valenzuela which has upgraded with the opening of The SM Store. People from the city with more major shopping needs normally head south to cities such as Quezon City and Manila, since they have bigger malls and commercial centers with more diverse trade goods.

Water supply for the city is supplied by the Metropolitan Water Works and Sewerage System (MWSS)' west concessionaire Maynilad Water Services, Inc. (MWSI). As of 2006, the city has at least 68% water service coverage as determined by the Regulatory Office of the MWSS. Each customer receives at least 7 psi water pressure, which means supply can reach for up to two floors for residential use. Maynilad is owned and currently operated by DMCI Holdings, Inc.–Metro Pacific Investments Corporation (DMCI-MPIC).

On June 2, 2010, the Sitero Francisco Memorial National High School in barangay Ugong unveiled its first solar generators, the first time for a school in the Philippines. The six 1-kilowatt photovoltaic solar arrays installed to light nine classrooms are bought from Wanxiang America Corporation through the Foundation for Environmental Education (FEE) and are part of the solar energy initiative of the city. The arrays were shipped from Illinois, and installation was paid for by the city government. First district representative Rex Gatchalian and former second district councilor Shalani Soledad headed the switching ceremony, which made it the first-ever solar-powered school in the country. The solar panels can generate 1 kW to 5 kW of electricity per hour depending on the intensity of sunlight. Unused solar energy is stored in eight deep-cycle batteries, which can be used after sunset. The panels also continue to absorb light from the night sky.

=== Waste management ===
According to the 2002 Metro Manila Solid Waste Management Report of the Asian Development Bank (ADB), Valenzuela has the highest number of identified recycling companies in the region. It was also said that recycling centers related to plastic materials are relatively higher than other recyclable objects like metals, paper, glass among others. Accordingly, the city government allocates an amount of about 785.70 Philippine pesos (approx. US$18 as of April 2011) for every transportation and collection costs of a ton of waste material. In 2003, the city generated about 307.70 tons of waste every day. In 2001, it was reported by ADB that the city has as high as 25% solid waste management cost recovery rate through service charges on households and other enterprises for operational activities associated with waste collection, treatment and disposal. That same year, the city's proposal to implement a community-based solid waste management project in barangay Mapulang Lupa, was approved by the national government, which involves social mobilization, training of personnel, implementation of segregated collection and establishment of materials recovery facility and windows composting operation among others. The city government was granted a maximum of US$25,000 from the Asian Development Bank for the operation of the project.

In 1988, the city opened its first waste disposal facility, the Lingunan Controlled Dumpsite. Every year, the facility collects and processes only about 60% of the entire city's waste through landfilling and recycling services. The dumpsite uses rice hull ash as daily cover and odor control material for the waste collected in the area. Lingunan Controlled Dumpsite also conducted some limited waste segregation and resource recovery operations before burial of residual waste. In 2006, the controlled dumpsite was closed per MMDA order in 2003 and was subsequently converted into a sanitary landfill as directed by RA 9003.

In statistics, 60% of the waste collected in the city is collected, hauled, and dumped in controlled dumpsites, while 5% is retrieved and recycled, and 35% is thrown everywhere in the city. Half of all these wastes are non-biodegradable wastes, which include plastics, Styrofoams, and rubbers alike, while the remaining are biodegradable wastes, which are 70% food and kitchen wastes, 20% plant wastes, and 10% animal wastes. In 2002, there are about 30 small and big junkshops that collect recyclable materials and 20 schools that require their students to bring recyclable stuff as school project.

The city spearheaded Metro Manila's implementation of a comprehensive waste management program in 1999, when it became the first area in the region to allocate 2.8 hectares of land in Barangay Marulas to serve as an ecology center and the location for the city's waste management program's operations center. Biodegradable wastes in this area are converted to fertilizers. In 2004, the city government funded the repair of 29 garbage trucks and purchase of another 20 trucks that may increase the capacity of Waste Management Office to do full rounds of garbage every week.

=== Justice management ===
In a joint study conducted by the Supreme Court of the Philippines and the United Nations Development Programme in July 2003, assessing inmate and institutional management among selected municipal and city jails in the National Capital Region, it was found that Valenzuela City Jail has a congestion rate of 170%. According to the study, the excess number of inmates in Metro Manila jails resulted in the outbreaks of various ailments such as psychiatric disorders, pulmonary tuberculosis, and skin diseases. The Bureau of Jail Management and Penology recommends the implementation of release programs under applicable laws.

The Bureau of Jail Management and Penology (BJMP) of Valenzuela is located along Valenzuela Hall of Justice in barangay Karuhatan. It was formerly located at the old city hall in barangay Maysan which was transferred by mayor Sherwin Gatchalian in 2010 along with other trial courts, the police headquarters and prosecutor's office of the city. That same year, the BJMP launched the Alternative Learning System program, in partnership with the local government and Department of Education (DepEd), as part of the rehabilitation programs to city jail inmates. Successful passers of the program received certification of DepEd as proof of completion of secondary education.

== Transportation ==
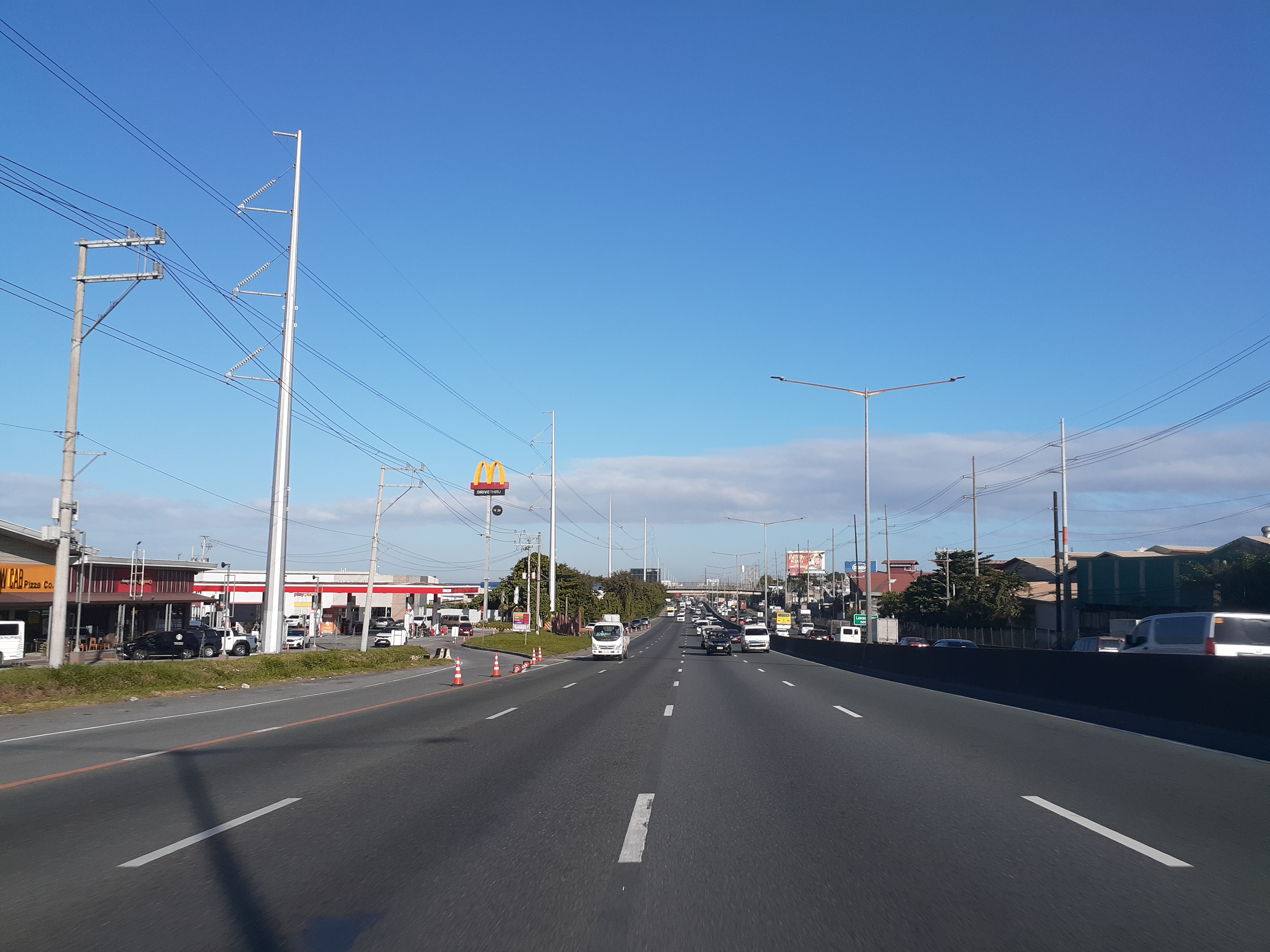
North Luzon Expressway southbound lane in Barangay Canumay West

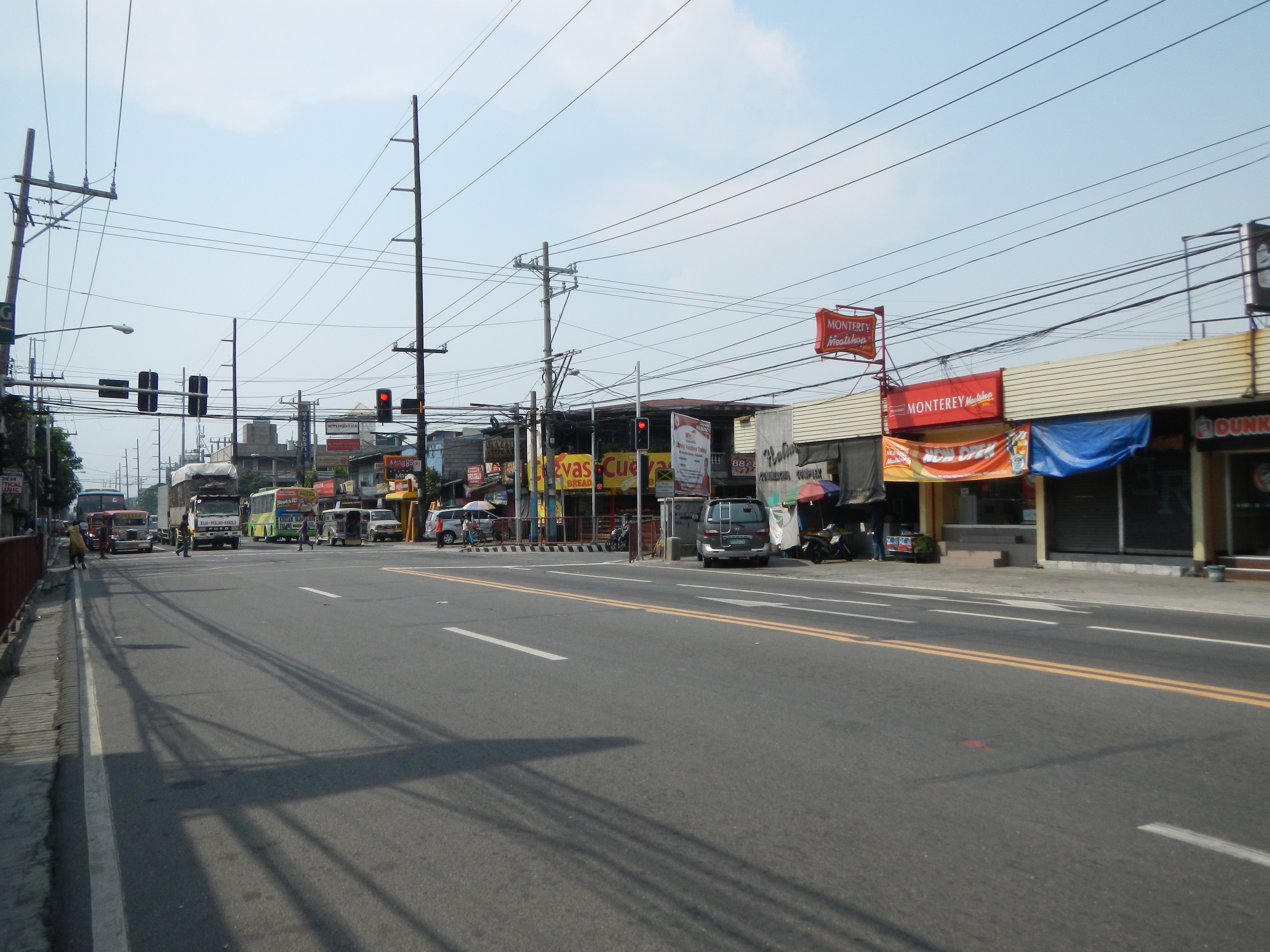
MacArthur Highway in Barangay Malanday

Expressways such as the North Luzon Expressway (NLEX) and NLEX Harbor Link project traverse through Valenzuela. Valenzuela is accessible to and from NLEX via the Paso de Blas Interchange, formerly known as Malinta Exit (due to the road's direct access to barangay Malinta), at Km. 28. It also has exits towards barangays Lingunan and Lawang Bato. Meanwhile, the Harbor Link project, where Segments 8.1 and 9 are components of Circumferential Road 5, provides access to Valenzuela through its interchanges at MacArthur Highway (Karuhatan), Harbor Link Interchange with NLEX, and Mindanao Avenue in barangay Ugong, as well as exits towards barangays Parada and Gen. T. de Leon.

Valenzuela is also connected to Bulacan through MacArthur Highway, which ends at Bonifacio Monument in Caloocan.

One of the well-known bridges in Valenzuela is the Tullahan Bridge in barangay Marulas that connects the city to barangay Potrero in Malabon. Tullahan bridge is part of MacArthur Highway that was built during the Spanish era as a way of transporting vehicles over Tullahan River. In the span of years, it was renovated repeatedly, the most recent being in 2008, though defects on the bridge began to appear barely six months after it opened for public use.

The city is webbed by hundreds of roads, where 99.622% of them have a surface type of concrete while the remaining 0.378% were made of dirt. The Department of Public Works and Highways recognizes nine national bridges in Valenzuela, listed below. Other bridges are just minor ones that connect small cliffs and former landfill areas, like Malinta Bridge in barangay Malinta. City roads have an average road density of 1.155 kilometers of road per 100 square kilometers of land area. Each road has an average road section of 155 sections and spans 54.267 kilometers (33.720 mi).

The Valenzuela Gateway Complex Terminal in Paso de Blas is designated by the Metropolitan Manila Development Authority as Manila's northern provincial bus terminal. Bus companies also founded terminals in Barangay Malanday, the northernmost locality of Valenzuela along the border with Bulacan, though there are terminals situated in barangays Dalandanan and Karuhatan as well. This includes Laguna Star Bus, PAMANA Transport Service, Inc., CEM Trans Services and Philippine Corinthian Liner, Inc., among others. These buses are lined with Metro Manila destinations only, usually in Alabang or Baclaran with routes along EDSA. Bus traffic is also dense at barangays Paso de Blas and Bagbaguin due to their proximity to the Paso de Blas Interchange and bus terminals in Novaliches, Quezon City. Other modes of transportation includes jeepneys (with routes usually from Malanday to Recto, Santa Cruz, Divisoria, Pier 15 South Harbor & T. M. Kalaw in Manila and Grace Park & Monumento in Caloocan and Malinta to Malolos City, Baliwag and Santa Maria along MacArthur Highway) for general mass transportation, tricycles (or trikes) for small-scale transportation and taxicabs for upper middle classes.

There are no airports and ports in Valenzuela.

== External relations ==
Valenzuela is twinned with the following towns and cities:

| Country | Place | Region / State | Date |
|---|---|---|---|
| South Korea | Bucheon | Gyeonggi | 2006 |
| Philippines | Santa Cruz | Marinduque | 2008 |
| Philippines | Narvacan | Ilocos Sur | 2012 |
| Philippines | Angeles | Pampanga | 2012 |
| Philippines | Altavas | Aklan | 2012 |
| Philippines | Koronadal | South Cotabato | 2012 |
| Philippines | Bayugan | Agusan del Sur | 2012 |
| Philippines | Alabat | Quezon | 2012 |
| Philippines | Buenavista | Quezon | 2012 |
| Philippines | Calauag | Quezon | 2012 |
| Philippines | Candelaria | Quezon | 2012 |
| Philippines | Catanauan | Quezon | 2012 |
| Philippines | Dolores | Quezon | 2012 |
| Philippines | General Nakar | Quezon | 2012 |
| Philippines | Guinayangan | Quezon | 2012 |
| Philippines | Gumaca | Quezon | 2012 |
| Philippines | Infanta | Quezon | 2012 |
| Philippines | Jomalig | Quezon | 2012 |
| Philippines | Lucban | Quezon | 2012 |
| Philippines | Macalelon | Quezon | 2012 |
| Philippines | Padre Burgos | Quezon | 2012 |
| Philippines | Pagbilao | Quezon | 2012 |
| Philippines | Perez | Quezon | 2012 |
| Philippines | Sampaloc | Quezon | 2012 |
| Philippines | San Antonio | Quezon | 2012 |
| Philippines | San Narciso | Quezon | 2012 |
| Philippines | Sariaya | Quezon | 2012 |
| Philippines | Unisan | Quezon | 2012 |
| Philippines | Taraka | Lanao del Sur | 2012 |
| Philippines | Malinao | Albay | 2012 |
| Philippines | Quezon | Quezon | 2012 |
| Philippines | Batangas | Batangas | 2012 |
| Philippines | Luna | La Union | 2012 |
| Philippines | Calapan | Oriental Mindoro | 2012 |
| Philippines | Allen | Northern Samar | 2012 |
| Philippines | Kananga | Leyte | 2012 |
| Philippines | Navotas | Metro Manila | 2013 |
| Philippines | Marilao | Bulacan | 2013 |
| Philippines | Santa Maria | Laguna | 2013 |
| Philippines | Mina | Iloilo | 2014 |
| Philippines | Daet | Camarines Norte | 2014 |
| Philippines | Mercedes | Camarines Norte | 2014 |
| Philippines | Dumangas | Iloilo | 2014 |
| Philippines | Cabatuan | Iloilo | 2014 |
| Philippines | New Lucena | Iloilo | 2014 |
| Philippines | Pambujan | Samar | 2014 |
| Philippines | Lavezares | Northern Samar | 2014 |
| Philippines | Sagay | Camiguin | 2014 |
| Philippines | Hernani | Eastern Samar | 2014 |
| Philippines | Jose Panganiban | Camarines Norte | 2014 |
| Philippines | Vinzons | Camarines Norte | 2014 |
| Philippines | Labo | Camarines Norte | 2014 |
| Philippines | San Antonio | Nueva Ecija | 2014 |
| Philippines | Legazpi | Albay | 2014 |
| Philippines | Bustos | Bulacan | 2014 |
| Philippines | San Vicente | Northern Samar | 2014 |
| Philippines | Laoag | Ilocos Norte | 2015 |
| Philippines | Urdaneta | Pangasinan | 2015 |
| Philippines | San Fernando | La Union | 2015 |
| Philippines | Panglima Sugala | Tawi-Tawi | 2015 |
| Philippines | Goa | Camarines Sur | 2016 |
| Philippines | Baliwag | Bulacan | 2016 |
| Philippines | Cuenca | Batangas | 2016 |
| Philippines | Natonin | Mountain Province | 2017 |
| Philippines | Rizal | Cagayan | 2017 |
| Philippines | San Mateo | Rizal | 2017 |
| Philippines | Bulan | Sorsogon | 2018 |
| Philippines | Capoocan | Leyte | 2018 |
| Philippines | Oroquieta | Misamis Occidental | 2019 |
| Philippines | Dao | Capiz | 2019 |
| Philippines | La Paz | Abra | 2019 |
| Philippines | Bongabong | Oriental Mindoro | 2019 |
| Philippines | Pandan | Antique (province) | 2020 |

=== Friendship links ===
Valenzuela has friendship links (with no formal constitution) with the following towns and cities. Agreements are usually forged towards industrial, cultural or academic exchanges and understanding.

- Yangzhou, Jiangsu China
- Kauaʻi, Hawaii, United States

== Notable people ==
- Pío Valenzuela (1869–1956), physician, patriot, writer and member of the Katipunan society, namesake of Valenzuela

=== Media and Entertainment ===
- Franzen Fajardo (born 1982), actor, TV host, and former reality show contestant
- Glaiza de Castro (born 1988), actress and singer starred Heidi Fernandez-Montreal on Temptation Of Wife Philippines
- Randy Santiago (born 1960), actor, television host, singer, songwriter, producer, director and entrepreneur
- Raymart Santiago (born 1973), action star and comedian
- Ford Valencia (born 1995), Pinoy Boyband Superstar winner, member of Boyband PH
- Pablo Santiago Sr. (died 1998), film director and producer
- Justin (born 1998), singer

=== Sports ===
- Virgilio "Billy" Abarrientos, member of the Crispa Redmanizers
- Gerard "Gerry" Esplana (born 1966), former athlete (1993–2003), former member of Presto Tivolis, Santa Lucia Realtors and Shell Turbo Chargers, and former city councilor (2004–2013)
- Roberto "Bobby" Jose, member of the 1989 Petron Blaze Boosters Grand Slam team and was the PBA All Star during his rookie year

=== Government ===
- Danilo Concepcion, former youth sector representative to the Interim Batasang Pambansa (1978–1984), former Vice President for Legal Affairs of University of the Philippines, Dean of UP College of Law since 2011, and concurrently President of the University of the Philippines since 2017
- Atty. Santiago San Andres de Guzman, Municipal Mayor from 1988 to 1992
- Eugenio Angeles (1868–1977), former Associate Justice of the Supreme Court of the Philippines from 1967 to 1968
- Charee Pineda (born 1990), actress and city councilor since 2013
- Ignacio Santiago Sr., former mayor (1956–1959 and 1964–1967) of Valenzuela, then governor of Bulacan from 1968 to 1986
- Bobbit Carlos (born 1957), former mayor (1995–2004) and representative (2004–2007)
- Florentino V. Floro Jr. (born 1953), former judge
- Rex Gatchalian (born 1979), former mayor (2013–2022), representative (2007–2013, 2022–2023) and Secretary of Social Welfare and Development since 2023
- Win Gatchalian (born 1974), former mayor (2004–2013), representative (2001–2004, 2013–2016) and Senator of the Philippines since 2016
- Guillermo S. Santos (1915–1991), former Associate Justice of the Supreme Court from 1977 to 1980
- José Serapio, former mayor (1912–1917) and former governor of Bulacan (1900–1901)
- Shalani Soledad (Shalani Soledad-Romulo) (born 1980), former city councilor (2004–2013) and TV personality

== See also ==
- Geography of Manila
- Greater Manila Area
- Imperial Manila
- List of parks in Manila
- List of populated places in Metro Manila
- List of renamed cities and municipalities in the Philippines
- Mega Manila
- Public transport in Manila
- Transportation in Metro Manila
