= 1992 Valenzuela local elections =

Local elections in Valenzuela, Metro Manila, Philippines

1992 Valenzuela mayoral election
- May 11, 1992
Candidate	Santiago "Santy" de Guzman	Wilfredo Chongco	Romeo Llenado
Party	NPC	Liberal	LDP
Running mate	Felipe Cortez	Mariano Salazar	Jose Emmanuel "Bobbit" L. Carlos
Popular vote	54,193	22,875	22,868
Percentage	47.72	20.14	20.14
Mayor before election
Santiago "Santy" A. de Guzman
Nacionalista
Elected mayor
Santiago "Santy" A. de Guzman
NPC

The 1992 Valenzuela local elections were held in the municipality of Valenzuela, Metro Manila, on May 11, 1992, as part of the 1992 Philippine general election. The electorate chose a municipal mayor, a vice mayor, twelve members of the Sangguniang Bayan, and the representative of Valenzuela's lone congressional district.

Incumbent mayor Santiago "Santy" A. de Guzman of the Nationalist People's Coalition was re-elected. Municipal councilor Jose Emmanuel "Bobbit" L. Carlos was elected vice mayor, while incumbent representative Antonio M. Serapio of the Nationalist People's Coalition was re-elected to the House of Representatives.

Valenzuela was a municipality at the time of the election. It was converted into a highly urbanized city under Republic Act No. 8526, which took effect following its ratification in 1998.

== Background ==
The 1992 polls were the first synchronized presidential, congressional and local elections conducted under the 1987 Constitution. Republic Act No. 7166 scheduled the elections for the second Monday of May 1992 and provided for synchronized national and local elections thereafter. Political scientist Julio Teehankee described the polls as the first synchronized election of the post-1986 constitutional period.

Before the election, Santiago "Santy" A. de Guzman was the incumbent municipal mayor. Jose Emmanuel "Bobbit" L. Carlos, who was serving as a member of the municipal council, contested the vice-mayoral election.

== Electoral system ==
The mayor, vice mayor and representative were elected separately by plurality voting, with the candidate receiving the largest number of votes winning the office. The mayor and vice mayor were elected throughout the municipality, while the representative was elected from Valenzuela's lone congressional district.

Under Republic Act No. 6636, Valenzuela was allocated twelve regular municipal councilors. Republic Act No. 7166 subsequently required the Commission on Elections to divide each Metro Manila municipality into two councilor districts by barangay. Valenzuela therefore elected six councilors from each district through plurality block voting.

The elected local officials received three-year terms beginning at noon on June 30, 1992, pursuant to Section 43 of the Local Government Code of 1991.

== Results ==
=== Mayor ===
Incumbent mayor Santiago "Santy" A. de Guzman was re-elected.

1992 Valenzuela mayoral election
Candidate	Party	Votes	%
Santiago "Santy" de Guzman (incumbent)	Nationalist People's Coalition	54,193	47.72
Wilfredo Chongco	Liberal Party	22,875	20.14
Romeo Llenado	Laban ng Demokratikong Pilipino	22,868	20.14
Eduardo Franco	Lakas–NUCD	11,234	9.89
Theodore Uy	Kilusang Bagong Lipunan	2,325	2.05
Elias Dulalia	Independent	71	0.06
Total		113,566	100.00
Nationalist People's Coalition hold			
Source: Commission on Elections

=== Vice mayor ===
Councilor Jose Emmanuel "Bobbit" L. Carlos was elected vice mayor.

1992 Valenzuela vice mayoral election
Candidate	Party	Votes	%
Jose Emmanuel "Bobbit" L. Carlos	Laban ng Demokratikong Pilipino	45,789	43.01
Felipe Cortez	Nationalist People's Coalition	27,381	25.72
Mariano Salazar	Liberal Party	17,179	16.14
Ernesto Reyes	Lakas–NUCD	14,090	13.23
Romeo Soriano	Kilusang Bagong Lipunan	2,028	1.90
Total		106,467	100.00
Laban ng Demokratikong Pilipino gain from Nationalist People's Coalition			
Source: Commission on Elections

=== Municipal council ===
Twelve regular members of the Sangguniang Bayan were elected, with six councilors representing each of Valenzuela's two councilor districts.

=== House of Representatives ===
Incumbent representative Antonio Serapio of the Nationalist People's Coalition was re-elected with 43,026 votes, or 40.97 per cent of the votes counted for the office.

1992 Valenzuela Lone District Representative election
Candidate	Party	Votes	%
Antonio Serapio (incumbent)	Nationalist People's Coalition	43,026	40.97
Geronimo Angeles	Laban ng Demokratikong Pilipino	29,553	28.14
Ricardo Valmonte	Lakas–NUCD	22,283	21.22
Arturo Samonte	Koalisyong Pambansa	5,441	5.18
Melencio Cea	Nacionalista Party	2,098	2.00
Ciriaco Cea	People's Reform Party	1,130	1.08
Paulino Gutierrez Jr.	Kilusang Bagong Lipunan	841	0.80
Emiliano Dizon	People's Reform Party	413	0.39
Nenita Gallarde	Kilusang Bagong Lipunan	232	0.22
Total		105,017	100.00
Nationalist People's Coalition hold			
Source: Commission on Elections

== Aftermath ==
De Guzman and Carlos served as mayor and vice mayor, respectively, during the 1992–1995 local-government term. Serapio represented Valenzuela in the 9th Congress of the Philippines, which sat from 1992 to 1995.

== See also ==
- 1992 Philippine general election
- 1992 Philippine House of Representatives elections
- Valenzuela City Council
