= 2010 Valenzuela local elections =

4th City elections in Valenzuela, Metro Manila

- May 10, 2010

Mayoral, vice mayoral, congressional representatives and all 12 city council seats
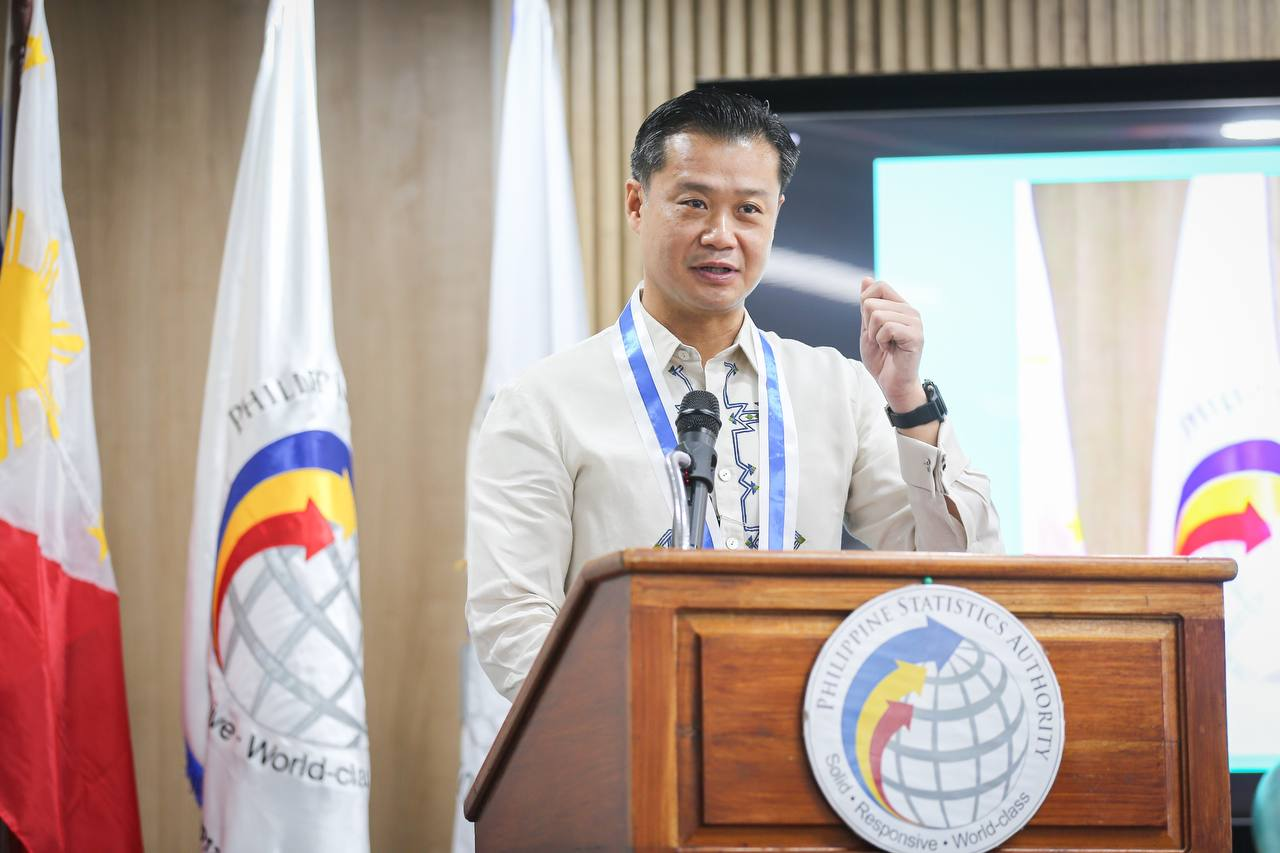

Nominee	Sherwin Gatchalian	Boy Carreon
Party	NPC	Lakas–Kampi
Running mate	Eric Martinez	Mar Morelos
Popular vote	162,999	13,920
Percentage	88.15	7.53
Mayor before election
Sherwin Gatchalian
NPC
Elected mayor
Sherwin Gatchalian
NPC

Local elections were held in Valenzuela on May 10, 2010, within the Philippine general election. The voters elected for the elective local posts in the city: the mayor, vice mayor, the two Congressmen, and the councilors, six in each of the city's two legislative districts.

== Mayoral and vice mayoral election ==
Incumbent Sherwin Gatchalian was reelected to his second term as the mayor of Valenzuela City. Eric Martinez won his first term as the vice mayor of the city.

The incumbent mayor Sherwin Gatchalian ran for mayoralty office under the Nationalist People's Coalition (NPC) party with his running mate Eric Martinez. Gatchalian, who is a businessman, was the former representative of the city's first district to Philippine Congress from 2001 before his election in 2004. Martinez was a former member of the city's second district council before his election in vice mayoralty position in 2007.

Pablo Hernandez III, a columnist from the tabloid Bulgar also announced his bid in mayoralty race as an independent candidate. He said that he will run for office as "to provide an alternative to the ruling political group in the city.". Another candidate for the office of the mayor is Manuel "Boy" Carreon, is running under the Lakas-Kampi-CMD party. Carreon was dubbed by the Philippine Daily Inquirer as a "politically unknown" person in political arena.

Another candidate for the vice mayor's office is Marcelino "Mar" Morelos, one of the city's councilors for the first district since 2001. Before entering politics, Morelos was a professional basketball player where he played under the Pop Cola Panthers and San Miguel Beermen teams from 1996 to 2002. The third candidate for vice mayor is Ignacio "Jun" Santiago, also a member of the city's first district council.

== Congressional elections ==
There were two candidates for the congressman or district representative post of each of the districts of Valenzuela City. The city is divided into two congressional districts: the first district encompasses 23 barangays in the northern portion of the city and the second district which contains 9 barangays.

The incumbent first district representative Rexlon "Rex" Gatchalian running under the Nationalist People's Coalition, the same political party he had during the 2007 election. Gatchalian, a businessman, is the younger brother of the incumbent mayor Sherwin Gatchalian. In 2007, he defeated former mayor Bobbit Carlos in the congressional race, hence making this his first political position ever held. The other candidate for congressman is Atty. Maria Elisa "Leezl" Mendoza, a former government lawyer for the human rights division of the Valenzuela City Hall of Justice and Chairman of the People's Law Enforcement Board (PLEB). Atty. Leezl Mendoza is also the founder of INTEG with advocacies on renewable energy, land use and stewardship as a way towards food security and economic empowerment.

For the second district, the incumbent representative Magtanggol "Magi" Gunigundo ran under the Lakas-Kampi-CMD party. A lawyer by profession, he became the representative of the former municipality of Valenzuela from 1998 to 2001. The election of 2007 installed him as the second district representative of the city. Gunigundo's opponent to the race is Carlitos "Sonny" Tiquia, a pastor of the Valenzuela Evangelical Church and a former member of the Valenzuela City council.

Many of the candidates for the city council were previous incumbents. In the first district, this list includes Corazon Cortez, Gerald Esplana, Katherine Pineda, and Ritche Cuadra; Adrian Dapat, Fernando Padrinao, Kate Abigael Galang, Maria Cecilia Mayo, and Shalani Carla Soledad for the second district. Soledad became infamous due to her previous withdrawal of running for Congress under Lakas-Kampi-CMD, where she decided to seek another re-election under Liberal Party instead. This was to support her boyfriend Senator Benigno Aquino III, presidential bet of the Liberal Party.

== Poll survey ==
Based in March 2010 mock polls done by the Pamantasan ng Lungsod ng Valenzuela, the city's state university, and was attended by 1,355 student volunteers, the following candidates garnered the spot:

Mayoral race (Voters' turnout: 96.75%)
Person	Number of mock votes	Percentage
Carreon, Manuel	23	1.69%
Hernandez, Pablo III	34	2.51%
Gatchalian, Sherwin	1,254	92.55%
Undecided	44	3.25%

Vice mayoral race (Voters' turnout: 105.24%)
Person	Number of mock votes	Percentage
Martinez, Eric	916	67.9%
Morelos, Marcelino	276	20.37%
Ignacio, Santiago Jr.	88	6.49%
Undecided	~75	+5.24%

== Election results ==
The winners of the congressional, mayor and vice mayor seats of Valenzuela City is determined with the highest number of votes received. These positions are voted separately, so there is a possibility that the winning officials came from the same or different political parties.

=== Mayoral race ===
Valenzuela City mayoral election
Party	Candidate	Votes	%
NPC	Sherwin "Win" T. Gatchalian	162,999	88.15
Lakas–Kampi	Manuel "Boy" C. Carreon	13,920	7.53
Independent	Pablo "Pabs" L. Hernandez III	8,002	4.32
Total votes		184,921	100.00

=== Vice mayoral race ===
Valenzuela City vice mayoral election
Party	Candidate	Votes	%
Liberal	Eric "Eric" M. Martinez	83,279	44.93
Lakas–Kampi	Marcelino "Mar" G. Morelos	66,911	36.10
Nacionalista	Ignacio "Jun" G. Santiago, Jr.	35,177	18.98
Total votes		185,637	100.00

=== Congressional race ===
==== First District ====
Rexlon T. Gatchalian is the incumbent

Philippine House of Representatives election at Valenzuela's 1st district
Party	Candidate	Votes	%
NPC	Rexlon T. Gatchalian	74,977	90.43
Independent	Ma. Elisa D. Mendoza	7,933	9.57
Valid ballots		82,910	92.94
Total votes		89,208	100.00
NPC hold			

==== Second district ====
Magi Gunigundo is the incumbent.

Philippine House of Representatives election at Valenzuela's 2nd district
Party	Candidate	Votes	%
Lakas–Kampi	Magtanggol T. Gunigundo II	66,495	64.10
NPC	Carlitos B. Tiquia	37,237	35.90
Valid ballots		103,732	95.26
Total votes		108,893	100.00
Lakas–Kampi hold			

=== Election at the city council ===
The voters in the city are set to elect six councilors on the district where they are living, hence registered. Candidates are voted separately so there are chances where winning candidates will have unequal number of votes and may come from different political parties.

==== Summary ====
Party	Votes	%	Seats
Lakas Kampi CMD	329,566	32.97	2
Nationalist People's Coalition	308,608	30.87	5
Nacionalista Party	221,215	22.13	3
Liberal Party	136,817	13.69	2
Independent	3,496	0.35	0
Ex officio seats			2
Total	999,702	100.00	14
Total votes	198,101	–	

==== First district ====
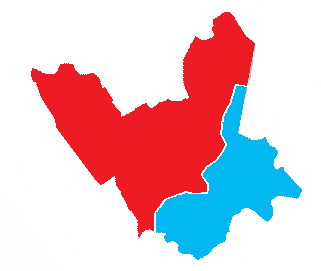
Legislative districts of Valenzuela City. Areas shown in red represent the first district; blue represent second district.

First district council election
Party	Candidate	Votes	%
Liberal	Ritche "RDC" D. Cuadra	57,259	12.91
Lakas–Kampi	Katherine "Khay" C. Pineda	52,985	11.94
NPC	Antonio "Tony" R. Espiritu	52,139	11.75
NPC	Gerald "Gerry" A. Esplana	47,831	10.78
NPC	Corazon "Cora" A. Cortez	47,214	10.64
NPC	Marlon Paulo "Idol" D. Alejandrino	44,598	10.05
NPC	Emmanuel "Noel" S. Delesmo	38,083	8.58
Lakas–Kampi	Meilene "Meme" T. Dizor	27,870	6.28
NPC	Joel "Joel" S. Angeles	24,501	5.52
Lakas–Kampi	Buenaventura "Bong" S. Sanguyo III	21,521	4.85
Lakas–Kampi	Ernesto "Nico" M. Trinidad	17,009	3.83
Lakas–Kampi	Joel "Joel" M. Co	12,599	2.84
Total votes		89,208	100.00

==== Second district ====
Second district council election
Party	Candidate	Votes	%
Liberal	Shalani Carla "Lani" S. Soledad	79,558	14.31
Nacionalista	Kate Abigael "Kate" D. Galang-Coseteng	74,811	13.45
Lakas–Kampi	Maria Cecilia "Cecil" V. Mayo	56,677	10.19
NPC	Lailanie "Lai" P. Nolasco	54,242	9.75
Nacionalista	Lorena "Lorie" C. Natividad-Borja	52,218	9.39
Nacionalista	Adrian "Adrian" C. Dapat	51,412	9.25
Nacionalista	Fernando "Boy" D. Padrinao	42,774	7.69
Lakas–Kampi	Kristian Rome "Tyson" T. Sy	39,695	7.14
Lakas–Kampi	Moises "MB" S. Beltran	30,107	5.41
Lakas–Kampi	Jasmin "Jas" P. Antonio	27,376	4.92
Lakas–Kampi	Mary Ann "Keng" D. Manalaysay	24,595	4.42
Lakas–Kampi	Johnny "JT" N. Tan	19,132	3.44
Independent	Robert "Kuya" T. Cruz	3,496	0.63
Total votes		108,893	100.00
