= 2025 Valenzuela local elections =

9th City elections in Valenzuela, Metro Manila

- May 12, 2025
- Mayoral election
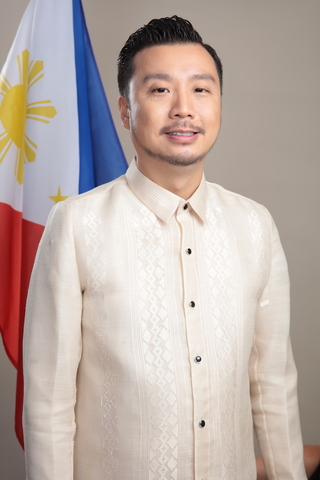
Candidate	Wes Gatchalian
Party	NPC
Running mate	Marlon Alejandrino
Popular vote	295,876
Percentage	100.00%
Mayor before election
Wes Gatchalian
NPC
Elected mayor
Wes Gatchalian
NPC
- Vice mayoral election
Candidate	Marlon Alejandrino	Gilbert Gamas
Party	NPC	Independent
Popular vote	244,708	54,931
Percentage	81.67%	18.33%
Vice mayor before election
Lorena Natividad-Borja
NPC
Elected Vice mayor
Marlon Alejandrino
NPC
- City Council election

12 of 14 seats in the Valenzuela City Council 8 seats needed for a majority
Party	NPC	Lakas	PFP
Last election	10 seats, 63.68%	1 seat, 6.23%	1 seat, 5.61%

Local elections were held in Valenzuela on May 12, 2025, as part of the 2025 Philippine general election. The electorate will elect a mayor, a vice mayor, 12 members of the Valenzuela City Council, and two district representatives to the House of Representatives of the Philippines. The officials elected in the election will assume their respective offices on June 30, 2025, for a three-year-long term.

== Electoral system ==
Local elections in the Philippines are held in every second Monday of May, every three years starting in 1992. Single-seat positions (mayor, vice mayor and House representative) are elected via first-past-the-post-voting. The mayor and vice mayor are elected by the city at-large, while the House representative and city councilors are elected per district.

City council elections are done via plurality block voting; for the Valenzuela City Council, the city is divided into two districts, with each district sending six councilors. There are two other ex officio seats, from the federation presidents of the Liga ng mga Barangay and Sangguniang Kabataan; these will be determined later in the year at the barangay and Sangguniang Kabataan elections.

Voters in Valenzuela shall also elect senators and party-list representatives on this day.

== Candidates ==
=== Administration coalition ===
Team Tuloy ang Progreso, Valenzuela
#	Position	Name	Party
1.	Mayor	Wes Gatchalian	NPC
1.	Vice mayor	Marlon Idol Alejandrino	NPC
2.	1st district House representative	Kenneth Gatchalian	NPC
2.	2nd district House representative	Katherine Martinez	NUP
1.	1st district councilor	Kisha Ancheta	NPC
2.	1st district councilor	Atty. Bimbo Dela Cruz	NPC
3.	1st district councilor	Richard Enriquez	Lakas
4.	1st district councilor	Cris Feliciano	NUP
5.	1st district councilor	Ghogo Lee	NPC
6.	1st district councilor	Goyong Serrano	NPC
4.	2nd district councilor	Chiqui Carreon	NPC
8.	2nd district councilor	Niña Lopez	NPC
9.	2nd district councilor	Lorie Natividad-Borja	NPC
10.	2nd district councilor	Louie Nolasco	NPC
12.	2nd district councilor	Mickey Pineda	NPC
13.	2nd district councilor	Sel Sabino-Sy	NPC

=== Other candidates ===
Candidates not in tickets
#	Position	Name	Party
2.	Vice mayor	Gilbert Gamas	Independent
1.	1st district House representative	Tony Espiritu	Aksyon
3.	1st district House representative	Jing Hernandez	Independent
1.	2nd district House representative	Gerald Galang	Independent
2.	2nd district councilor	Jasper Barcelona	Aksyon
3.	2nd district councilor	Marvin Canengneng	Independent
5.	2nd district councilor	Leticia Castillo	Makabayan
6.	2nd district councilor	Danilo Cueto	Independent
11.	2nd district councilor	Rommel Ortega	DPP

== Mayoral election ==
Incumbent mayor Wes Gatchalian was elected to his first term as mayor in the 2022 Valenzuela local elections. Before being elected mayor, Gatchalian was the representative for Valenzuela's 1st congressional district from 2016.

=== Candidates ===
- Weslie "Wes" T. Gatchalian (Nationalist People's Coalition) - incumbent mayor and reelectionist.

=== Results ===
2025 Valenzuela city mayoral election result
Candidate	Party	Votes	%
Wes Gatchalian	Nationalist People's Coalition	295,876	100.00
Total		295,876	100.00
Valid votes		438,556	88.31
Invalid/blank votes		58,061	11.69
Total votes		496,617	100.00
Wes Gatchalian (NPC) hold			
Source: COMELEC

== Vice mayoral election ==
Incumbent vice mayor Lorie Natividad-Borja was elected to her third term as vice mayor in the 2016 elections. Due to term limits, she is barred from running the same position and instead running for city councilor of 2nd district.

=== Candidates ===
- Marlon Paulo "Marlon Idol" D. Alejandrino (Nationalist People's Coalition) - former city councilor from 1st district.
- Gilbert I. Gamas (Independent)

=== Results ===
2025 Valenzuela city vice mayoral election result
Candidate	Party	Votes	%
Marlon Idol Alejandrino	Nationalist People's Coalition	244,708	81.67
Gilbert Gamas	Independent	54,931	18.33
Total		299,639	100.00
Valid votes		438,556	88.98
Invalid/blank votes		54,298	11.02
Total votes		492,854	100.00
Marlon Idol Alejandrino (NPC) won			
Source: COMELEC

Popular vote percentage
Marlon Idol Alejandrino	81.67%
Gilbert Gamas	18.33%

== City council elections ==
The voters in the city elected six councilors on the district where they are registered. Each district elects its own set of councilors via multiple non-transferable vote.

Party	Votes	%	Seats
Nationalist People's Coalition	1,080,866	76.04	10
National Unity Party	109,719	7.72	1
Lakas–CMD	97,119	6.83	1
Aksyon Demokratiko	27,283	1.92	0
Makabayan	26,325	1.85	0
Democratic Party of the Philippines	17,422	1.23	0
Independent	62,651	4.41	0
Ex officio seats			2
Total	1,421,385	100.00	14

Bimbo Dela Cruz, Cris Feliciano, and Ghogo Lee are incumbent city councilors from the 1st district first elected in 2019, 2022, and 2019, respectively. Meanwhile, Chiqui Carreon, Niña Lopez, Louie Nolasco, Mickey Pineda, and Sel Sabino-Sy are incumbent city councilors from the 2nd district first elected in 2019, 2019, 2022 and 2022, respectively.

=== First district ===
2025 Valenzuela city council election in the 1st district
Candidate	Party	Votes	%
Cris Feliciano	National Unity Party	109,719	19.07
Ghogo Lee	Nationalist People's Coalition	99,735	17.33
Richard Enriquez	Lakas–CMD	97,119	16.88
Bimbo Dela Cruz	Nationalist People's Coalition	97,089	16.87
Kisha Ancheta	Nationalist People's Coalition	87,436	15.19
Goyong Serrano	Nationalist People's Coalition	84,395	14.66
Total		575,493	100.00
Valid votes		1,261,980	100.00
Invalid/blank votes		0	0.00
Total votes		1,261,980	100.00
NPC hold			
Source: COMELEC

=== Second district ===
2025 Valenzuela city council election in the 2nd district
Candidate	Party	Votes	%
Lorie Natividad-Borja	Nationalist People's Coalition	134,245	15.87
Niña Lopez	Nationalist People's Coalition	122,571	14.49
Sel Sabino-Sy	Nationalist People's Coalition	117,693	13.91
Chiqui Carreon	Nationalist People's Coalition	113,943	13.47
Mickey Pineda	Nationalist People's Coalition	112,955	13.35
Louie Nolasco	Nationalist People's Coalition	110,804	13.10
Marvin Canengneng	Independent	43,425	5.13
JV Barcelona	Aksyon Demokratiko	27,283	3.23
Leticia Castillo	Makabayan	26,325	3.11
Danilo Cueto	Independent	19,226	2.27
Rommel Ortega	Democratic Party of the Philippines	17,422	2.06
Total		845,892	100.00
Valid votes		845,892	98.35
Invalid/blank votes		14,202	1.65
Total votes		860,094	100.00
NPC hold			
Source: COMELEC

== House of Representatives elections ==
=== First district ===
In 2022, Rex Gatchalian was elected as the first district representative after serving as the mayor since 2013. However, President Bongbong Marcos appointed him as the Secretary of Social Welfare and Development on January 31, 2023, making the seat vacant. From this time of appointment, Quezon's first district representative Mark Enverga was appointed as the legislative caretaker of the district.

==== Candidates ====
- Antonio Espiritu (Aksyon Demokratiko) - former city councilor and vice mayor.
- Kenneth Gatchalian (Nationalist People's Coalition) - businessman, brother to senator Sherwin Gatchalian, DSWD secretary Rex Gatchalian, and incumbent mayor and reelectionist Wes Gatchalian.
- Evelyn Hernandez (Independent) - former vice mayor.

==== Results ====
2025 Valenzuela 1st District Representative election result
Candidate	Party	Votes	%
Kenneth Gatchalian	Nationalist People's Coalition	80,410	49.45
Tony Espiritu	Aksyon Demokratiko	79,629	48.96
Jing Hernandez	Independent	2,586	1.59
Total		162,625	100.00
Valid votes		210,330	95.99
Invalid/blank votes		8,784	4.01
Total votes		219,114	100.00
Kenneth Gatchalian (NPC) won			
Source: COMELEC

Popular vote percentage
Kenneth Gatchalian	49.45%
Tony Espiritu	48.96%
Jing Hernandez	1.59%

=== Second district ===
Incumbent representative Eric Martinez was first elected in 2016. Due to term limits, he is barred from running as the second district representative and chose to run for the Philippine Senate.

==== Candidates ====
- Gerald Galang (Independent) - incumbent city councilor from the 2nd district
- Katherine Martinez (National Unity Party) - wife of incumbent representative Eric Martinez

==== Results ====
2025 Valenzuela 2nd District Representative election result
Candidate	Party	Votes	%
Gerald Galang	Independent	95,878	54.36
Kat Martinez	National Unity Party	80,490	45.64
Total		176,368	100.00
Valid votes		176,368	97.60
Invalid/blank votes		4,330	2.40
Total votes		180,698	100.00
Gerald Galang (Independent) won			
Source: COMELEC

Popular vote percentage
Gerald Galang	54.36%
Kat Martinez	45.64%
