= 2022 Valenzuela local elections =

Local elections

- May 9, 2022

Mayoral, vice mayoral, congressional representatives and all 12 city council seats
- Mayoral election
| Candidate | Wes Gatchalian | Bombit Bernardo |
| Party | NPC | LINKOD |
| Running mate | Lorena Natividad-Borja | Ricardo de Gula |
| Popular vote | 275,650 | 75,026 |
| Percentage | 78.61 | 21.39 |
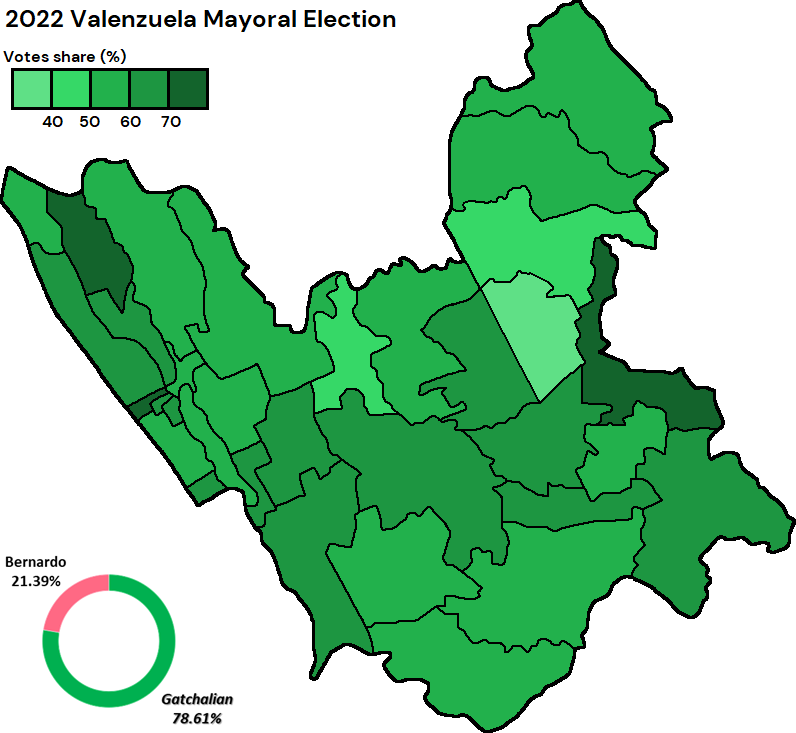
- Results by Barangay
Mayor before election
Rexlon Gatchalian
NPC
Elected mayor
Wes Gatchalian
NPC
- Vice mayoral election

| Candidate | Lorena Natividad-Borja | Ricardo de Gula |
| Party | NPC | LINKOD |
| Popular vote | 257,613 | 74,020 |
| Percentage | 77.68 | 22.32 |
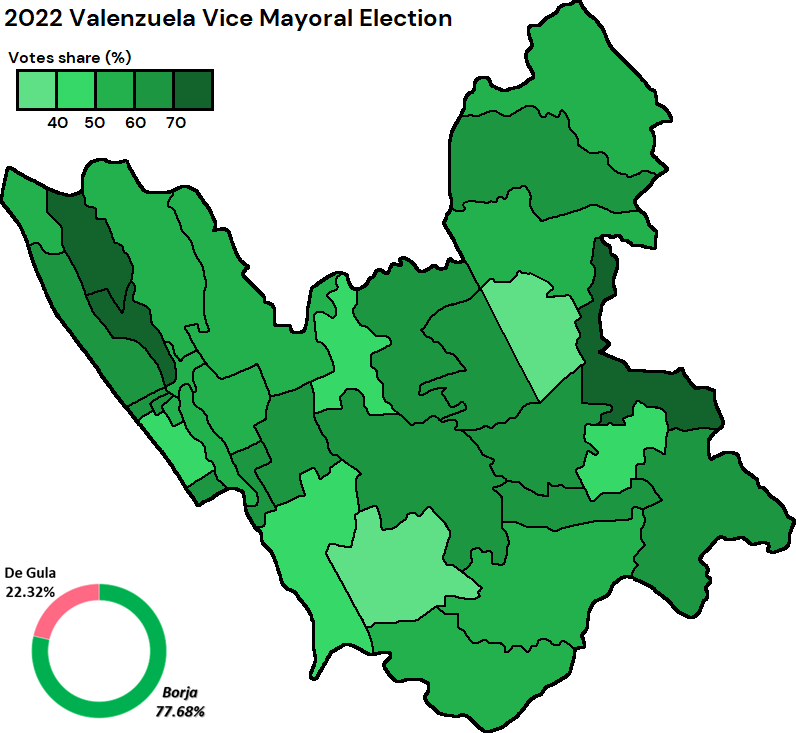
- Results by Barangay
Vice mayor before election
Lorena Natividad-Borja
NPC
Elected Vice mayor
Lorena Natividad-Borja
NPC

Local elections were held in Valenzuela on May 9, 2022, as part of the Philippine general election. Held concurrently with the national elections, the electorate voted to elect a mayor, a vice mayor, twelve city council members, and two district representatives to congress. Those elected took their respective offices on June 30, 2022, for a three-year-long term. 350,676 out of 443,611 registered voters voted in this election.

Representative Wes Gatchalian and Vice Mayor Lorena Natividad-Borja were elected to the city's mayoralty and vice mayoralty respectively, with Gatchalian being elected to his first term and Natividad-Borja being re-elected for her second. The NPC-affiliated Team Tuloy ang Progreso, Valenzuela won all twelve seats in the city council, securing the coalition complete control of the legislative body.

Outgoing Mayor Rex Gatchalian and Representative Eric Martinez were elected to represent the first and second districts respectively in the 19th Congress. The former was elected for his first term while the latter was elected for his third.

== Mayoral and vice mayoral election ==
Incumbent mayor Rex Gatchalian was elected to a third term as mayor in the 2019 elections. Due to term limits, he is ineligible to run for re-election; his party, the Nationalist People's Coalition nominated his brother, two-term representative Wes Gatchalian in his place. His main opponent was engineer Bombit Bernardo, the standard bearer of Lingkod ng Mamamayan ng Valenzuela City (LINKOD), who previously ran for vice mayor in 2004.

Incumbent vice mayor Lorie Natividad-Borja was elected to a second term as vice mayor in the 2019 elections after having served as a councilor representing the second district from 2001 to 2007 and from 2010 to 2016. Her main opponent was Karuhatan Barangay Captain Ricardo "Boy" De Gula.

== Congressional election ==
The incumbent first district representative was Weslie T. Gatchalian, younger brother to both senator Sherwin Gatchalian and incumbent mayor Rex Gatchalian. Weslie was on his second term as representative.

For the second district, incumbent representative Eric Martinez was also on his second term. He faced against former Valenzuela lone district and former Representative Magtanggol "Magi" Gunigundo in the election.

== Candidates ==
=== Administration coalition ===
Team Tuloy ang Progreso, Valenzuela
| # | Name | Party |
For Mayor
| 2. | Wes Gatchalian | NPC |
For Vice Mayor
| 2. | Lorie Natividad-Borja | NPC |
For House of Representatives (1st District)
| 1. | Rex Gatchalian | NPC |
For House of Representatives (2nd District)
| 2. | Eric Martinez | PDP–Laban |
For Councilor (1st District)
| 1. | Marlon "Idol" Alejandrino | NPC |
| 2. | Bimbo Dela Cruz | NPC |
| 4. | Ramon Encarnacion | NPC |
| 5. | Ricar Enriquez | Lakas |
| 7. | Cris Feliciano-Tan | PFP |
| 8. | Ghogo Lee | NPC |
For Councilor (2nd District)
| 3. | Chiqui Carreon | NPC |
| 7. | Gerald Galang | NPC |
| 10. | Niña Lopez | NPC |
| 11. | Louie Nolasco | NPC |
| 12. | Mickey Pineda | NPC |
| 13. | Sel Sabino-Sy | NPC |

=== Primary opposition coalition ===
Team BTS
| # | Name | Party |
For Mayor
| 1. | Bombit Bernardo | LINKOD |
For Vice Mayor
| 1. | Ricardo "Boy" de Gula | LINKOD |
For House of Representatives (2nd District)
| 1. | Magi Gunigundo | LINKOD |
For Councilor (1st District)
| 3. | Ariel Dillena | LINKOD |
| 6. | Waldo Estrella | LINKOD |
| 9. | Weng Lopez | LINKOD |
| 10. | Rodelio Lucero | LINKOD |
| 12. | Ernie Tolentino | LINKOD |
| 13. | Nico Trinidad | LINKOD |
For Councilor (2nd District)
| 1. | Baby Morales-Acuña | LINKOD |
| 2. | Nida Cainap | LINKOD |
| 5. | Jason de Gula | LINKOD |
| 6. | Rizalino "Bong" Ferrer | LINKOD |
| 9. | Shiela Gamuyod-Ruaya | LINKOD |
| 14. | Ferdie Urrutia | LINKOD |

=== Independent ===
Independent
| # | Name | Party |
For Councilor (1st District)
| 11. | Abet Mariano | Independent |
For Councilor (2nd District)
| 7. | Danilo Cueto | Independent |
| 8. | Gilbert Gamas | Independent |

== Election results ==
The winners of the congressional, mayor and vice mayor seats of Valenzuela City is determined with the highest number of votes received. These positions are voted separately, so there is a possibility that the winning officials came from the same or different political parties.

=== Mayoral election ===
Incumbent mayor was Rexlon "Rex" T. Gatchalian.

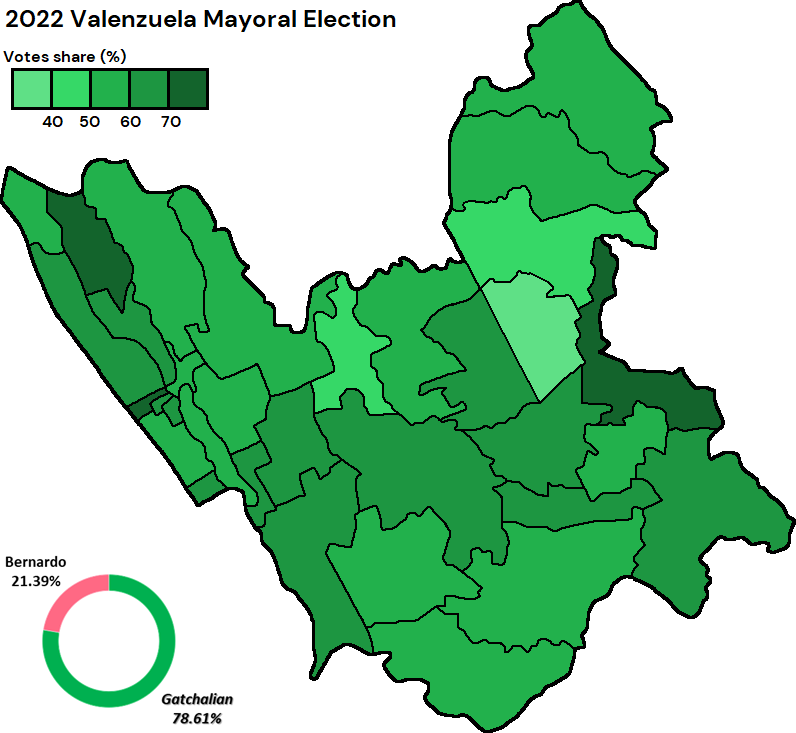
Votes shares of the two mayoral candidate for each Barangay of Valenzuela City

Valenzuela mayoral election
| Party | Candidate | Votes | % |
|---|---|---|---|
| NPC | Weslie T. Gatchalian | 275,650 | 78.61% |
| LINKOD | Bombit Bernardo | 75,026 | 21.39% |
| Total votes | | 350,676 | 100% |
| NPC hold | | | |

Popular vote percentage
| Wes Gatchalian | 78.61% |
| Bombit Bernardo | 21.39% |

=== Vice Mayoral election ===
Incumbent vice mayor was Lorena "Lorie" Natividad-Borja.

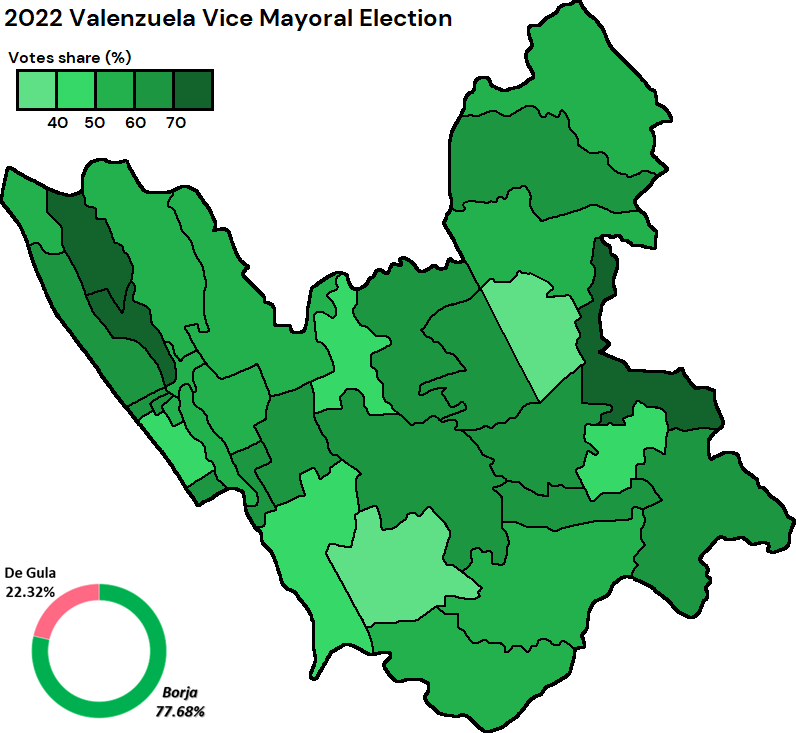
Votes shares of the two vice mayoral candidate for each Barangay of Valenzuela City

Valenzuela vice mayoral election
| Party | Candidate | Votes | % |
|---|---|---|---|
| NPC | Lorena C. Natividad-Borja (Incumbent) | 257,613 | 77.68% |
| LINKOD | Ricardo de Gula | 74,020 | 22.32% |
| Total votes | | 331,633 | 100% |
| NPC hold | | | |

Popular vote percentage
| Lorie Natividad-Borja | 77.68% |
| Boy de Gula | 22.32% |

=== Congressional elections ===
==== First district ====
Incumbent representative was Weslie Gatchalian.

Philippine House of Representatives election in the 1st District of Valenzuela
| Party | Candidate | Votes | % |
|---|---|---|---|
| NPC | Rexlon T. Gatchalian | 141,794 | 100% |
| Total votes | | 141,794 | 100% |
| NPC hold | | | |

==== Second district ====
Incumbent representative was Eric Martinez.

Philippine House of Representatives election in the 2nd District of Valenzuela
| Party | Candidate | Votes | % |
|---|---|---|---|
| PDP–Laban | Eric M. Martinez (Incumbent) | 132,241 | 72.33% |
| LINKOD | Magtanggol Gunigundo | 50,599 | 27.67% |
| Total votes | | 182,840 | 100% |
| PDP–Laban hold | | | |

=== City council elections ===
The voters in the city elected six councilors on the district where they are registered. Each district elects its own set of councilors via multiple non-transferable vote.

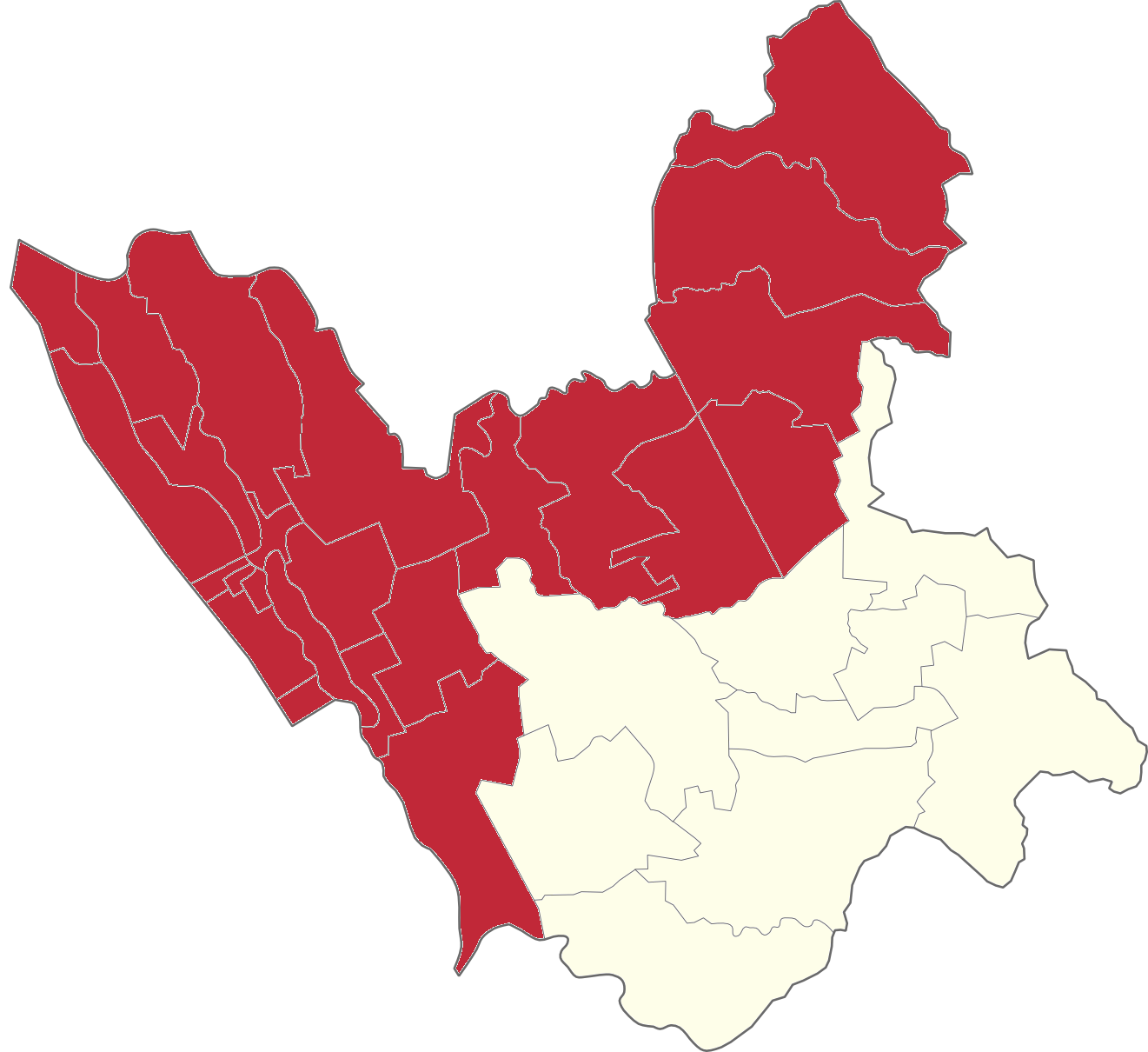
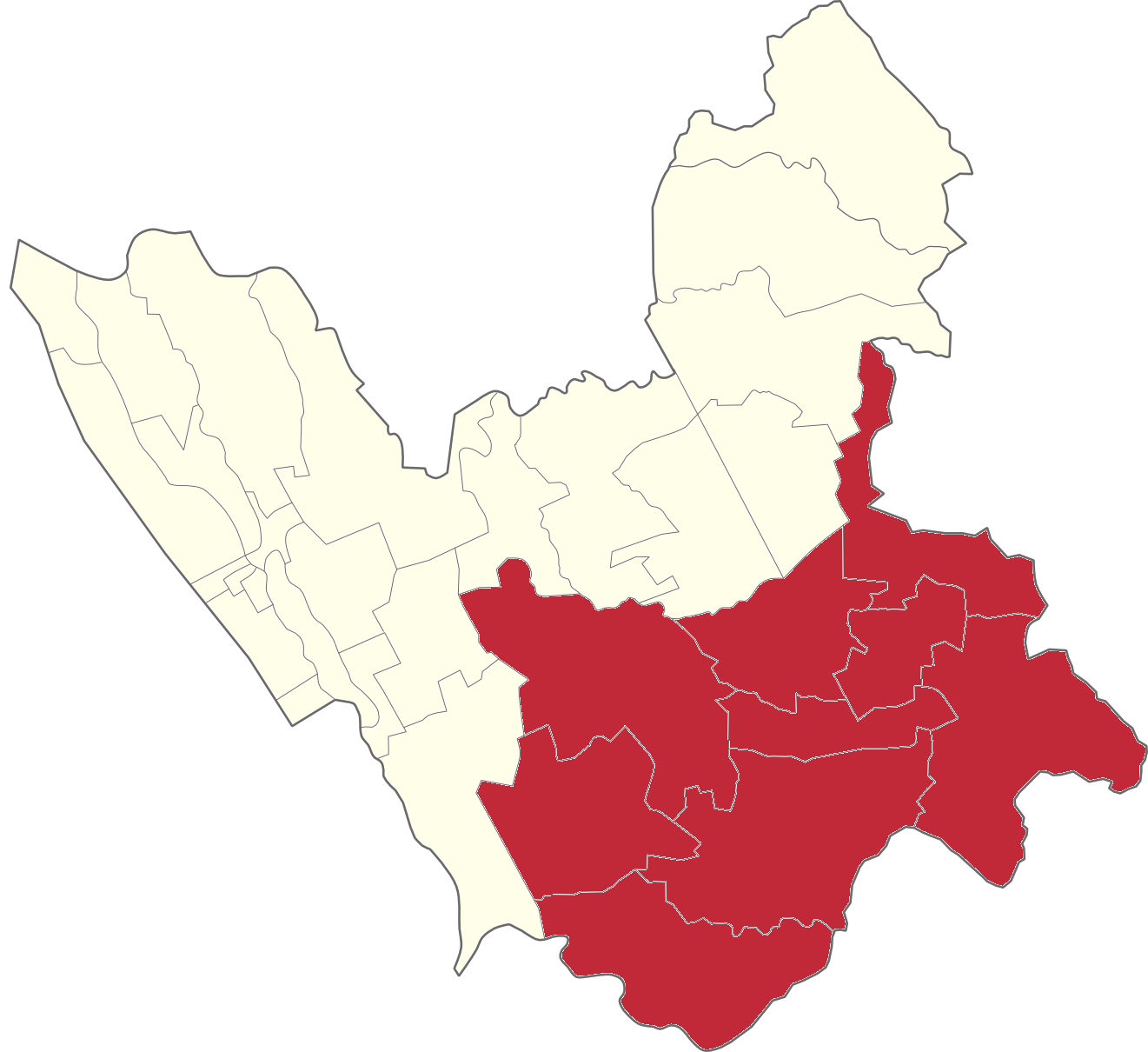
First (left) and second (right) legislative districts of Valenzuela.

| Party or alliance | | Votes | % | Seats |
|---|---|---|---|---|
| Team Tuloy ang Progreso, Valenzuela | Nationalist People's Coalition | 1,112,648 | 63.68 | 10 |
| Team Tuloy ang Progreso, Valenzuela | Lakas-CMD | 108,765 | 6.23 | 1 |
| Team Tuloy ang Progreso, Valenzuela | Partido Federal ng Pilipinas | 97,989 | 5.61 | 1 |
| Team Tuloy ang Progreso, Valenzuela | Total | 1,319,402 | 75.52 | 12 |
| Lingkod ng Mamamayan ng Valenzuela City | | 357,261 | 20.45 | 0 |
| Independent | | 70,527 | 4.04 | 0 |
| Ex officio seats | | | | 2 |
| Total | | 1,747,190 | 100.00 | 14 |

==== First district ====
Valenzuela City Council election in the 1st district
| Party | Candidate | Votes | % |
|---|---|---|---|
| NPC | Marlon Paulo D. Alejandrino | 110,391 | 30.33% |
| NPC | Ramon L. Encarnacion (Incumbent) | 109,999 | 30.22% |
| Lakas | Ricardo Ricarr C. Enriquez (Incumbent) | 108,765 | 29.88% |
| PFP | Cristina Marie M. Feliciano-Tan | 97,989 | 26.92% |
| NPC | Joseph William D. Lee (Incumbent) | 89,881 | 24.69% |
| NPC | Walter Magnum D. dela Cruz (Incumbent) | 82,732 | 22.73% |
| Independent | Alberto Mariano | 49,599 | 13.63% |
| LINKOD | Ernesto Trinidad | 34,874 | 9.58% |
| LINKOD | Ernesto Tolentino | 33,417 | 9.18% |
| LINKOD | Eduardo Estrella | 20,725 | 5.69% |
| LINKOD | Rowena Lopez | 19,685 | 5.41% |
| LINKOD | Rodelio Lucero | 18,836 | 5.17% |
| LINKOD | Ariel Dillena | 16,983 | 4.67% |
| Total votes | | 793,876 | 100.00 |

| Party or alliance | | Votes | % | Seats |
|---|---|---|---|---|
| Team Tuloy ang Progreso, Valenzuela | Nationalist People's Coalition | 393,003 | 49.50 | 4 |
| Team Tuloy ang Progreso, Valenzuela | Lakas-CMD | 108,765 | 13.70 | 1 |
| Team Tuloy ang Progreso, Valenzuela | Partido Federal ng Pilipinas | 97,989 | 12.34 | 1 |
| Team Tuloy ang Progreso, Valenzuela | Total | 599,757 | 75.55 | 6 |
| Lingkod ng Mamamayan ng Valenzuela City | | 144,520 | 18.20 | 0 |
| Independent | | 49,599 | 6.25 | 0 |
| Total | | 793,876 | 100.00 | 6 |

==== Second district ====
Valenzuela City Council election in the 2nd district
| Party | Candidate | Votes | % |
|---|---|---|---|
| NPC | Gerald Cloyd Alexis D.V. Galang | 129,817 | 35.66% |
| NPC | Niña Sheila B. Lopez (Incumbent) | 121,113 | 33.27% |
| NPC | Roselle C. Sabino-Sy | 119,614 | 32.86% |
| NPC | Louie P. Nolasco (Incumbent) | 118,363 | 32.52% |
| NPC | Christopher Joseph M. Pineda | 115,831 | 31.82% |
| NPC | Chiqui Marie N. Carreon (Incumbent) | 114,907 | 31.57% |
| LINKOD | Rizalino Ferrer | 45,475 | 12.49% |
| LINKOD | Jason de Gula | 45,230 | 12.43% |
| LINKOD | Marie Shiela Gamuyod-Ruaya | 38,323 | 10.53% |
| LINKOD | Gertrudes Morales-Acuña | 36,489 | 10.02% |
| LINKOD | Fernando Urrutia | 25,457 | 6.99% |
| LINKOD | Nida Cainap | 21,767 | 5.98% |
| Independent | Gilbert Gamas | 12,513 | 3.44% |
| Independent | Danilo Cueto | 8,415 | 2.31% |
| Total votes | | 953,314 | 100.00 |

| Party | Votes | % | Seats |
|---|---|---|---|
| Nationalist People's Coalition | 719,645 | 75.49 | 6 |
| Lingkod ng Mamamayan ng Valenzuela City | 212,741 | 22.32 | 0 |
| Independent | 20,928 | 2.20 | 0 |
| Total | 953,314 | 100.00 | 6 |
