= Mapulang Lupa National High School =

Public high school in Valenzuela, Philippines

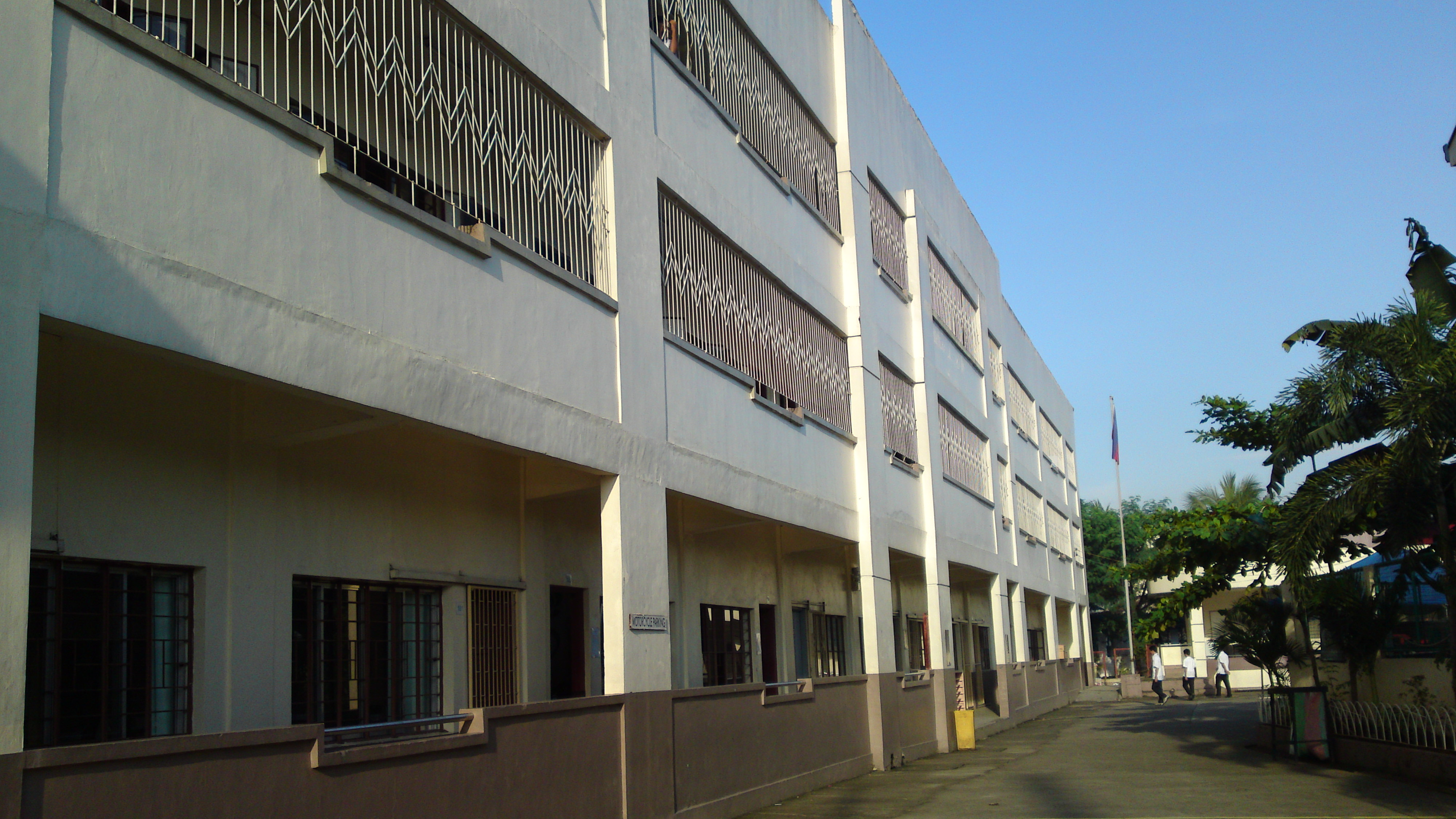

Location
- Pabaya Extension Mapulang Lupa; Valenzuela City; Philippines
- Coordinates: 14°42′06″N 121°00′34″E

Information
- Motto: "Aim High Mapulanian!"
- Established: June 2003
- Status: Public Junior High School and Senior High School
- Principal: Nolasco H. Sablan
- Grades: 7 to12
- Colour: Light blue
- Nickname: MLNHS
- Newspaper: Red Pen and Sipa't Dalumat

Mapulang Lupa National High School is a public secondary school located in Valenzuela City. Formerly known as Valenzuela National High School - Mapulang Lupa Annex, it was established in 2003 and gained its independent status on September 13, 2006 through House Bill #5776 (3RS-13 C) sponsored by the late Congressman Antonio M. Serapio together with then Albay representative Joey S. Salceda and Negros Occidental representative Jose Carlos V. Lacson during the 13th Congress.

== School Principals ==
- Genindina M. Sumbillo (2003 – 2006)
- Lagrimas B. Bayle (2006 - 2009)
- Meliton P. Zurbano (2009 - 2013)
- Eddie A. Alarte (2013 - 2016)
- Edelina I. Golloso (2016 - July 2, 2018)
- Rudy Fran Falcunitin (July 2, 2018 – June 18, 2024)
- Lilia H. Jaime (June 18, 2024 - February 13, 2026)
- Nolasco H. Sablan (February 13, 2026 - Present)

== Curriculum ==
=== K+12 basic education curriculum ===
Grade 7

Subject
English
Filipino
Mathematics
Science
Araling Panlipunan
Edukasyon sa Pagpapakatao
Music, Art, Physical Education and Health
Technology and Livelihood Education

Grade 8

Subject
English
Filipino
Mathematics
Science
Araling Panlipunan
Edukasyon sa Pagpapakatao
Music, Art, Physical Education and Health
Technology and Livelihood Education

Grade 9

Subject
English
Filipino
Mathematics
Science
Araling Panlipunan
Edukasyon sa Pagpapakatao
Music, Art, Physical Education and Health
Technology and Livelihood Education

Grade 10

Subject
English
Filipino
Mathematics
Science
Araling Panlipunan
Edukasyon sa Pagpapakatao
Music, Art, Physical Education and Health
Technology and Livelihood Education

== See also ==
- Education in Valenzuela City
- Valenzuela City
