= Valenzuela's 2nd congressional district =

Legislative district of the Philippines

- Constituency for the House of Representatives of the Philippines
- Boundary of Valenzuela's 2nd congressional district in Valenzuela
- Location of Valenzuela within Metro Manila
- City: Valenzuela
- Region: Metro Manila
- Population: 354,084 (2020)
- Electorate: 228,226 (2025)
- Major settlements: 9 barangays: Bagbaguin; General T. De Leon; Karuhatan; Mapulang Lupa; Marulas; Maysan; Parada; Paso de Blas; Ugong
- Area: 18.69 km^{2} (7.22 sq mi)

Current constituency
- Created: 1998
- Representative: Gerald Cloyd Alexis D.V. Galang
- Political party: Lakas–CMD
- Congressional bloc: Majority

Valenzuela's 2nd congressional district is one of the two congressional districts of the Philippines in the city of Valenzuela. It has been represented in the House of Representatives of the Philippines since 2001. The district was created following Valenzuela's conversion into a highly urbanised city through Republic Act No. 8526 on February 14, 1998. It consists of nine barangays in the southern part of the city, namely Bagbaguin, General T. de Leon, Karuhatan, Mapulang Lupa, Marulas, Maysan, Parada, Paso de Blas, and Ugong. It is currently represented in the 20th Congress by Gerald Cloyd Alexis D.V. Galang of the Lakas–CMD.

== Representation history ==
#	Image	Member	Term of office		Congress	Party	Electoral history	Constituent LGUs
#	Image	Member	Start	End	Congress	Party	Electoral history	Constituent LGUs
=== Valenzuela's 2nd district for the House of Representatives of the Philippines ===
District created February 14, 1998.
1		Magtanggol Gunigundo I	June 30, 2001	June 30, 2004	12th	Lakas	Redistricted from the at-large district and re-elected in 2001.	2001–present Bagbaguin, General T. de Leon, Karuhatan, Mapulang Lupa, Marulas, Maysan, Parada, Paso de Blas, Ugong
2		Antonio Serapio	June 30, 2004	February 19, 2007	13th	Nacionalista	Elected in 2004. Died.	2001–present Bagbaguin, General T. de Leon, Karuhatan, Mapulang Lupa, Marulas, Maysan, Parada, Paso de Blas, Ugong
(1)		Magtanggol Gunigundo I	June 30, 2007	June 30, 2016	14th	Liberal	Elected in 2007.	2001–present Bagbaguin, General T. de Leon, Karuhatan, Mapulang Lupa, Marulas, Maysan, Parada, Paso de Blas, Ugong
(1)		Magtanggol Gunigundo I	June 30, 2007	June 30, 2016	15th	Lakas	Re-elected in 2010.	2001–present Bagbaguin, General T. de Leon, Karuhatan, Mapulang Lupa, Marulas, Maysan, Parada, Paso de Blas, Ugong
(1)		Magtanggol Gunigundo I	June 30, 2007	June 30, 2016	16th	Lakas	Re-elected in 2013.	2001–present Bagbaguin, General T. de Leon, Karuhatan, Mapulang Lupa, Marulas, Maysan, Parada, Paso de Blas, Ugong
3		Eric M. Martinez	June 30, 2016	June 30, 2025	17th	PDP	Elected in 2016.	2001–present Bagbaguin, General T. de Leon, Karuhatan, Mapulang Lupa, Marulas, Maysan, Parada, Paso de Blas, Ugong
3		Eric M. Martinez	June 30, 2016	June 30, 2025	18th	PDP	Re-elected in 2019.	2001–present Bagbaguin, General T. de Leon, Karuhatan, Mapulang Lupa, Marulas, Maysan, Parada, Paso de Blas, Ugong
3		Eric M. Martinez	June 30, 2016	June 30, 2025	19th	PDP	Re-elected in 2022.	2001–present Bagbaguin, General T. de Leon, Karuhatan, Mapulang Lupa, Marulas, Maysan, Parada, Paso de Blas, Ugong
4		Gerald Galang	June 30, 2025	Incumbent	20th	Independent	Elected in 2025.	2001–present Bagbaguin, General T. de Leon, Karuhatan, Mapulang Lupa, Marulas, Maysan, Parada, Paso de Blas, Ugong
4		Gerald Galang	June 30, 2025	Incumbent	20th	Lakas	Elected in 2025.	2001–present Bagbaguin, General T. de Leon, Karuhatan, Mapulang Lupa, Marulas, Maysan, Parada, Paso de Blas, Ugong

== Election results ==
=== 2025 ===
2025 Valenzuela 2nd District Representative election result
Candidate	Party	Votes	%
Gerald Galang	Independent	95,878	54.36
Kat Martinez	NUP	80,490	45.64
Total		176,368	100.00
Valid votes		176,368	97.60
Invalid/blank votes		4,330	2.40
Total votes		180,698	100.00
Independent gain from Partido Demokratiko Pilipino			
Source: COMELEC

=== 2022 ===
Incumbent representative is Eric Martinez.

Philippine House of Representatives election in the 2nd District of Valenzuela
Party	Candidate	Votes	%
PDP–Laban	Eric M. Martinez (Incumbent)	132,241	72.33%
LINKOD	Magtanggol Gunigundo	50,599	27.67
Total votes		182,840	100%
PDP–Laban hold			

=== 2019 ===
Incumbent representative is Eric Martinez.

2019 Philippine House of Representatives election in the 2nd District of Valenzuela
Party	Candidate	Votes	%
PDP–Laban	Eric M. Martinez	106,848	73.8
Lakas	Magtanggol "Magi" T. Gunigundo	37,935	26.2
Valid ballots		119,991	90.9
Invalid or blank votes		11,980	9.1
Total votes		131,971	100.0
PDP–Laban hold			

=== 2016 ===
Incumbent Magi Gunigundo.

2016 Valenzuela congressional Second District election
Party	Candidate	Votes	%
PDP–Laban	Eric M. Martinez	86,069	60.13
Liberal	Adelma Yang-Gunigundo	44,045	30.77
Invalid or blank votes		13,027	9.10
Total votes		143,141	100.00
PDP–Laban gain from Lakas			

=== 2013 ===
Incumbent Magi Gunigundo.

2013 Philippine House of Representatives election at Valenzuela's 2nd district
Party	Candidate	Votes	%
Lakas	Magtanggol Gunigundo	56,542	48.73
Liberal	Shalani Soledad	53,800	46.37
Independent	Pablo Hernandez III	650	0.56
Invalid or blank votes		5,029	4.33
Total votes		116,021	100.00
Lakas hold			

=== 2010 ===
Incumbent Magi Gunigundo.

Philippine House of Representatives election at Valenzuela's 2nd district
Party	Candidate	Votes	%
Lakas–Kampi	Magtanggol T. Gunigundo II	66,495	64.10
NPC	Carlitos B. Tiquia	37,237	35.90
Valid ballots		103,732	95.26
Total votes		108,893	100.00
Lakas–Kampi hold			

=== 2007 ===
Incumbent Magi Gunigundo.

2007 Philippine House of Representatives election at Valenzuela's Second district
Party	Candidate	Votes	%
Liberal	Magtanggol Gunigundo	47,536	
NPC	Wes Gatchalian		
Invalid or blank votes			
Total votes			
Liberal gain from Nacionalista			

== See also ==
- Legislative districts of Valenzuela
