= St. Louis College Valenzuela =

Location
- #005 Maysan Road; Valenzuela; Philippines
- Coordinates: 14°41′46″N 120°58′17″E

Information
- Former name: Philippine College of Technological Resources (PCTR) (1976–1997)
- School type: Private
- Motto: Sapientia, Caritas, Veritas (Wisdom, Charity, Truth)
- Religious affiliation: Roman Catholic
- Patron saint: Aloysius Gonzaga
- Established: 1976
- Founder: Jose F. Oliveros
- Grades: Pre-school through undergraduate
- Colours: Yellow , Green , and Blue
- Website: www.slcv.edu.ph

St. Louis College Valenzuela, formerly known as Philippine College of Technological Resources (PCTR), is a private school located at Maysan Road, Valenzuela City, Philippines.

Politician and celebrity, Shalani Soledad, comic journalist, Marc Logan, and volleyball player Cha Cruz, are among its well-known high school alumni.

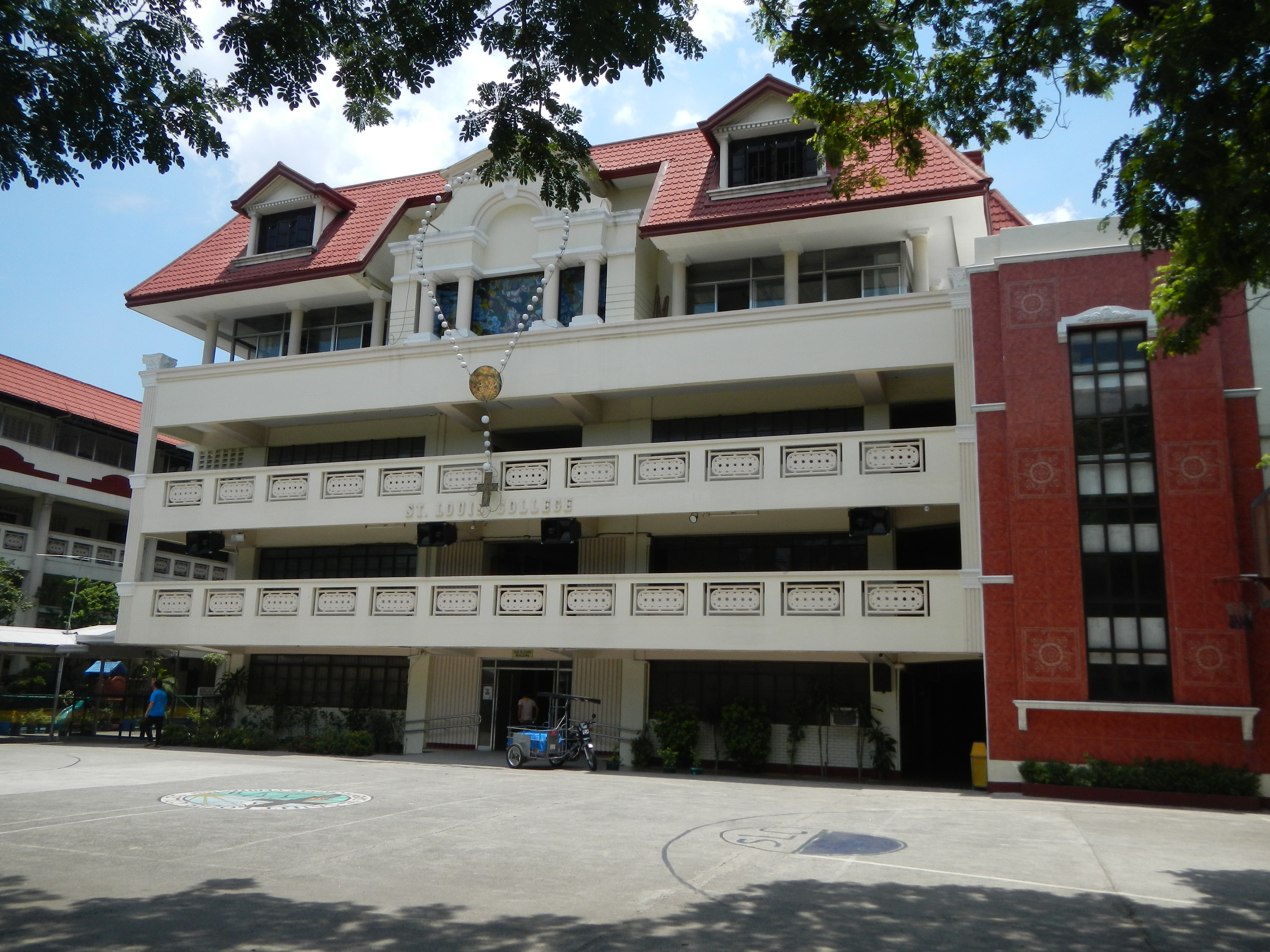
Facade
