= Magi Gunigundo =

Filipino politician

Magtanggol T. Gunigundo I
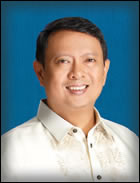
- Official portrait, 2013

Member of the Philippine House of Representatives from Valenzuela
- In office June 30, 2007 – June 30, 2016
- Preceded by: Antonio Serapio
- Succeeded by: Eric Martinez
- Constituency: 2nd District
- In office June 30, 2001 – June 30, 2004
- Preceded by: District created
- Succeeded by: Antonio Serapio
- Constituency: 2nd District
- In office June 30, 1998 – June 30, 2001
- Preceded by: Antonio Serapio
- Succeeded by: District abolished
- Constituency: Lone district

Deputy Majority Leader of the House of Representatives of the Philippines
- In office August 5, 2010 – June 30, 2016
- House Speaker: Feliciano Belmonte Jr.

Trial Lawyer at the Economic Intelligence and Investigation Bureau of Customs
- In office July 26, 1990 – October 1, 1997
- Commissioner: Guillermo L. Parayno Jr.

Special assistant for law enforcement at the Office of the Commissioner of Bureau of Customs
- In office June 30, 1992 – October 1, 1997
- Commissioner: Guillermo L. Parayno Jr.

Chief of Special Anti-Smuggling Unit of Bureau of Customs
- In office June 30, 1992 – October 1, 1997
- Commissioner: Guillermo L. Parayno Jr.

Chair of the Philippine House of Representatives Committee on Ethics
- In office July 21, 2001 – June 30, 2004

Chair of the Philippine House of Representatives Committee on Labor and Employment
- In office July 25, 2004 – June 30, 2007

Personal details
- Born: December 11, 1964 (age 61) Quezon City, Philippines
- Party: LINKOD (local party; 2018–present)
- Other political affiliations: Liberal (2007–08, 2010–18); Lakas–Kampi (2008–10); LDP (2004); Lakas (2000–04, 2004–07)
- Education: UP Diliman (BA); Ateneo de Manila (LLB)
- Profession: Lawyer

Magtanggol Tanjuan Gunigundo (born December 11, 1964), also known as Magi Gunigundo, is a Filipino politician who last served as the representative of the second district of Valenzuela to the House of Representatives from 2001 to 2004 and from 2007 to 2016. He also served as the representative of the now-defunct lone district of Valenzuela from 1998 to 2001.

He is an alumnus of the University of the Philippines Diliman.

== Early life ==
Magtanggol Gunigundo, also known by his nickname Magi, was born to Filipino politician Magtanggol C. Gunigundo and Prof. Sylvia Tanjuan Gunigundo in Quezon City. His early education was at the University of the Philippines Integrated School. He finished his AB Political Science at the University of the Philippines Diliman in 1985 and Bachelor of Laws at Ateneo de Manila University in 1989. He was 13th Placer at the 1989 Bar Examination.

== Career ==
He began practicing as an associate lawyer when he joined his father's firm in 1989. In 1990, he became a trial lawyer at the Economic Intelligence and Investigation Bureau of the Bureau of Customs until 1997. He became Special assistant for law enforcement at the Office of the Commissioner of Customs in 1992. In the same year, he became the chief of Special Anti-Smuggling Unit at the same office.

He was a senior partner at the Gunigundo-De Leon Law Office. In the 1998 general election, he became the representative of the lone district of the then-municipality of Valenzuela. He won re-election as representative of the new 2nd district of the newly chartered city of Valenzuela in 2001.

In 2004, he lost the mayoralty election to 1st district Representative Sherwin Gatchalian, amid reports of widespread cheating and election fraud. In 2007, he ran for a comeback to Congress for Valenzuela's 2nd district and won in a landslide victory as Congressman, winning in all precincts and barangays of such district. He was reelected in 2010.

Gunigundo is the principal author of several national laws like Republic Act No. 9048 (also known as Gunigundo Law) that authorizes the correction of clerical errors in birth certificates and other civil registry documents without the need of judicial order. The Gunigundo Law shortens the procedure for correction to less than three weeks and does away with the need for the services of a lawyer which is costly and the long litigation procedure in courts that could take between 6 and 24 months before the correction is permitted. It is now easier, faster and inexpensive to get the correction made. He also wrote two books about clerical law and customs modernization.

Gunigundo is also the principal author of Republic Act No. 10172 that amended several provisions of Republic Act No. 9048, expanding the power of local civil registrars to also correct errors in the date of birth (day and month) and gender in birth certificates. He is also the driving force in the adoption of the principles and framework of the Mother Tongue- Based Multilingual Education (MTBMLE) as a key component of Republic Act o. 10533 or the “Enhanced Basic Education Act of 2013” (also known as " K to 12 Act). Gunigundo is also the author of Republic Act No. 10535, better known as the "Philippine Standard Time Act that mandates synchronization of clocks with the time observed by PAG-ASA, the official timekeeper of the Philippines. Effective June 1, 2013, all government offices and media networks are now required to use Philippine Standard Time as a basis in set ting their timepieces.

In 2013, he narrowly defeated Councilor Shalani Soledad-Romulo for the congressional seat of the 2nd district of Valenzuela City. Being barred to seek reelection as representative, he ran for Mayor of Valenzuela in 2016 but lost to incumbent mayor Rex Gatchalian.

Gunigundo attempted a comeback to the Congress in 2019 and in 2022 but was unsuccessful in both instances to his successor, Eric Martinez.

House of Representatives of the Philippines
Preceded by Antonio Serapio	Representative of the Lone District of Valenzuela; 1998–2004	District dissolved
New district	Representative of the 2nd District of Valenzuela; 2001–2004	Succeeded by Antonio Serapio
Preceded by Antonio Serapio	Representative of the 2nd District of Valenzuela; 2007–2016	Succeeded by Eric Martinez
