= Lingkod ng Mamamayan ng Valenzuela City =

- Abbreviation: LINKOD; LMVC
- Leader: Magi Gunigundo
- Founded: 2021
- Ideology: Localism; Liberal democracy
- Colors: Pink
- House of Representatives (Valenzuela seats): 0 / 2
- Valenzuela City Council: 0 / 12

Lingkod ng Mamamayan ng Valenzuela City (lit. transl. Servant for Citizens of Valenzuela City), also known as team BTS or Bagong direksyon sa Tamang Serbisyo (lit. transl. New direction for Right Service) is a local party in Valenzuela City, in the Philippines, headed by former Valenzuela's 2nd district representative Magi Gunigundo.

LINKOD participated on 2022 Valenzuela local elections headed by Bombit Bernardo who ran for mayoralty but he lost against his rival Wes Gatchalian. Magi Gunigundo seek for another term as Valenzuela's 2nd district representative but lost against his rival incumbent Valenzuela's 2nd district representative Eric Martinez. Neither of the members won the local election.

On 2022 Philippine general election, there was a party-list called BTS or Bayaning Tsuper (lit. transl. Hero Driver) party-list which is not associated to this political party. However, BTS party-list failed to win any congressional seat.

== Electoral performance ==
Year	Mayoral election				Vice mayoral election			
Year	Candidate	Vote share (No. of votes)	Outcome	Result	Candidate	Vote share (No. of votes)	Outcome	Result
2022	Bombit Bernardo	21.39% (75,026)	Lost	Wes Gatchalian (NPC)	Boy de Gula	22.32% (74,020)	Lost	Lorie Natividad-Borja (NPC)

== Legislative ==
=== House of Representatives ===
Election	Seats allocated for Valenzuela	Outcome of election
2022	0 / 2	Lost

=== City Council ===
Election	Number of votes	Share of votes	Seats	Outcome of election
2022	357,261	20.45%	0 / 12	Lost
