= Gerald Galang =

Filipino politician (born 1993)

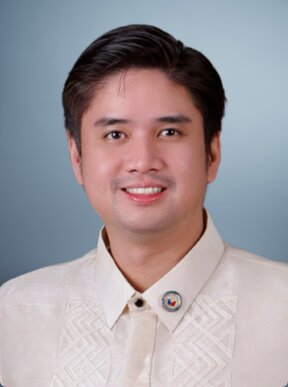
- Official portrait, 2026

Member of the House of Representatives from Valenzuela's 2nd district
- Incumbent
- Assumed office June 30, 2025
- Preceded by: Eric Martinez

Member of the Valenzuela City Council from the 2nd district
- In office June 30, 2022 – June 30, 2025

Personal details
- Born: Gerald Cloyd Alexis Dela Vega Galang; February 16, 1993 (age 33) Santa Cruz, Manila, Philippines
- Party: Lakas (2025–present)
- Other political affiliations: Independent (2024–2025); NPC (2021–2024)
- Education: De La Salle–College of Saint Benilde (BS); Yeungnam University (MPP)
- Occupation: Politician

Gerald Cloyd Alexis Dela Vega Galang (born February 16, 1993) is a Filipino politician who is the representative for Valenzuela's second district. Before being elected to Congress, he had served as a member of the Valenzuela City Council for the second district from 2022 to 2025.

== Early life and education ==
Galang was born on February 16, 1993, in Manila. He completed his elementary education at Siena College of Quezon City from 1999 to 2005 and his secondary education at Notre Dame of Greater Manila in 2009. While pursuing his studies, Galang served as the Sangguniang Kabataan (SK) Chairman of Marulas, Valenzuela, from 2010 to 2013.

He earned his bachelor's degree in industrial design from the De La Salle–College of Saint Benilde in 2014. He further pursued studies in international development at Enderun Colleges in 2016. He later obtained a master's degree in public policy in economic development from Yeungnam University in South Korea in 2018, where he graduated as class valedictorian and received the Excellence in Service Award.

== Valenzuela City Council (from 2022 to 2025) ==
In 2022, Galang was elected as a city councilor for Valenzuela's second district. During his tenure, he has chaired the Committee on Higher and Technical Education and the Committee on Social Services and sat in several others. As chairperson of the Committee on Higher and Technical Education in the city council, Galang serves as a member of the Board of Regents for both the Pamantasan ng Lungsod ng Valenzuela and Valenzuela City Polytechnic College. He is also the Executive Director of the Institute for Global Education, Exchange and Internship Inc., and a member of the Council of Young Leaders of the Philippines.

== House of Representatives (from 2025) ==
In the 2025 elections, Galang ran as an independent candidate for the congressional seat of Valenzuela's second district. He faced Katherine Martinez, the wife of the term-limited incumbent Eric Martinez, and won. On June 16, 2025, two weeks before taking office, Galang joined the Lakas–CMD, the majority party of the House.

== Electoral history ==
Electoral history of Gerald Galang
Year	Office	Party	Votes received				Result
Year	Office	Party	Total	%	P.	Swing	Result
2022	Councilor (Valenzuela–2nd)	NPC	129,817	35.66%	1st	—N/a	Won
2025	Representative (Valenzuela–2nd)	Independent	95,878	54.36%	1st	—N/a	Won

House of Representatives of the Philippines
Preceded by Eric Martinez	Member of the House of Representatives from Valenzuela's 2nd district 2025–present	Incumbent
