= Valenzuela City Council =

Legislative body of the city of Valenzuela, Philippines

Valenzuela City Council Sangguniang Panlungsod ng Lungsod ng Valenzuela
- 9th Valenzuela City Council

Type
- Type: Unicameral
- Term limits: 3 terms (9 years)

Leadership
- Presiding Officer: Marlon Paulo D. Alejandrino, NPC since June 30, 2025

Structure
- Seats: 12 councilors 2 ex officio members 1 presiding officer
- Political groups: Nationalist People's Coalition (11); Lakas–CMD (1); Partido Federal ng Pilipinas (1); Nonpartisan (2)
- Length of term: 3 years
- Authority: Valenzuela City Charter; Local Government Code of the Philippines

Elections
- Voting system: Plurality-at-large voting (12 seats); Indirect elections (2 seats)
- Last election: May 12, 2025
- Next election: May 8, 2028

Meeting place
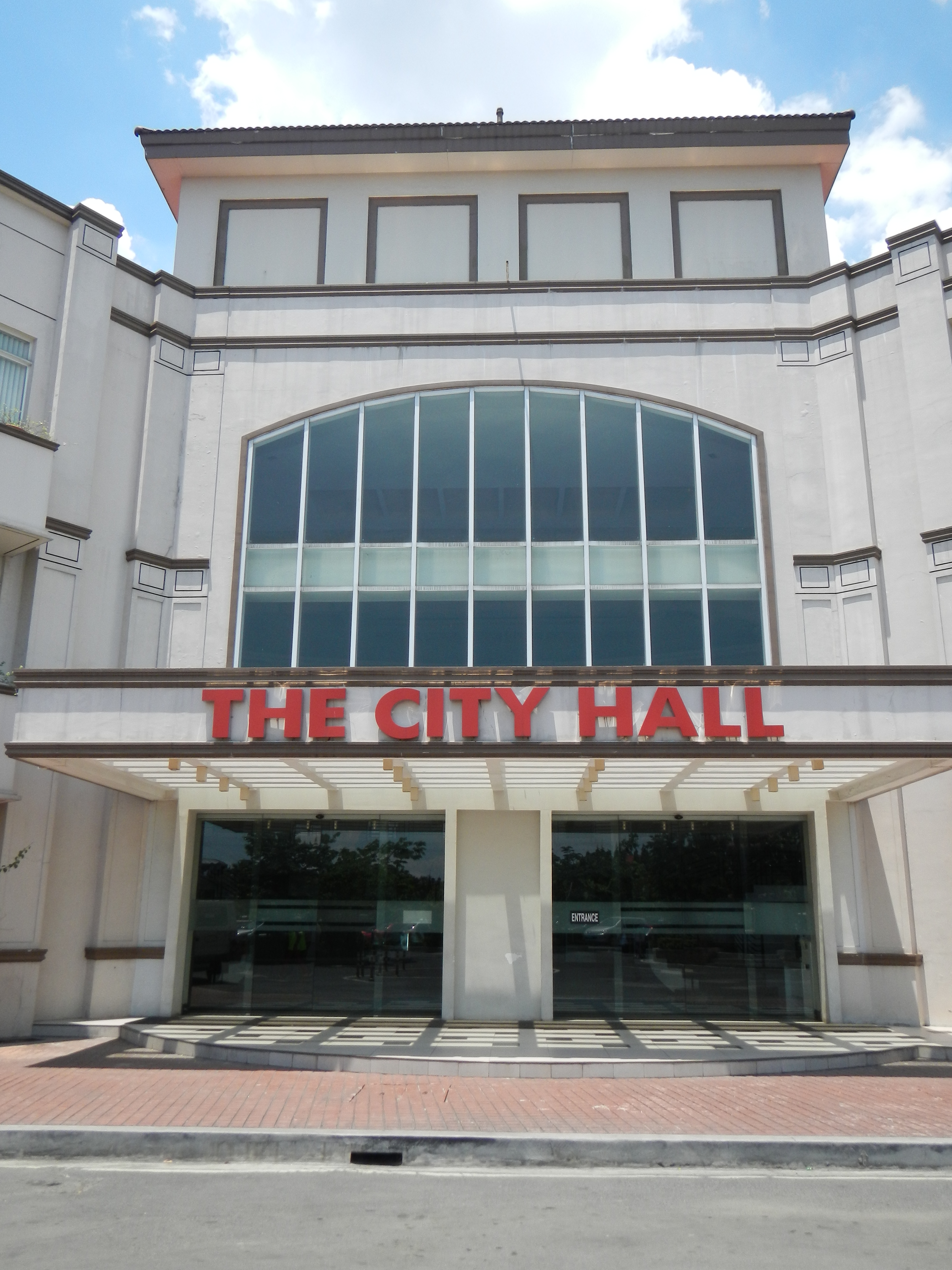
- Legislative Building, Valenzuela City Hall

Website
- https://valenzuela.gov.ph/sangguniang-panlungsod/

The Valenzuela City Council (Filipino: Sangguniang Panlungsod ng Lungsod ng Valenzuela) is the local legislature of the city of Valenzuela, Philippines. It is composed of 12 councilors elected from the city's two councilor districts (coextensive with the Legislative districts of Valenzuela) and two councilors elected from the ranks of barangay (neighborhood) chairmen and the Sangguniang Kabataan (SK; youth councils). The presiding officer of the council is the Vice Mayor, who is elected citywide.

The council is responsible for creating laws and ordinances under Valenzuela's jurisdiction. The city mayor can veto proposed bills, but the council can override it with a two-thirds supermajority.

== Powers, duties and functions ==
The Local Government Code of 1991 (Republic Act No. 7160), which establishes the Sangguniang Panlungsod as the city's legislative body, contains the following requirements:

- Pass legislation;
- Consent to resolutions;
- Adequate funding for the city's and its residents' general wellbeing; and
- Make sure the city is exercising its corporate rights in accordance with Section 22 of the Local Government Code.

Additionally, the Sangguniang Panlungsod is given responsibility for the following tasks and activities:

- approve the resolutions and ordinances required for an effective and efficient city government;
- Generate and maximize the utilization of funds and resources for the city's development plans, program goals, and top priorities as specified in Section 18 of the Local Government Code of 1991, paying special attention to expansion and improvement in the entire metropolis and agro-industrial development;
- Pass laws awarding franchises and permitting the issuance of permits or licenses, subject to the guidelines in Book II of the Local Government Code of 1991, but with conditions and goals intended to advance the welfare of the city's residents;
- Control activities pertaining to the use of land, buildings, and structures inside the city to advance the welfare of its populace as a whole;
- Approve ordinances that would guarantee the effective and efficient provision of the fundamental facilities and services as specified in Section 17 of the Local Government Code; and
- Use any additional powers and carry out any additional tasks or obligations outlined in a law or ordinance.

== Membership ==
Each of Valenzuela's two councilor districts elects six councilors to the council. In plurality-at-large voting, a voter may vote up to six candidates, with the candidates having the six highest number of votes being elected. In addition, the barangay chairmen and the SK chairmen throughout the city elect amongst themselves their representatives to the council. Hence, there are 14 councilors.

City council elections are synchronized with other elections in the country. Elections are held every first Monday of May every third year since 2001 for 12 seats, while the ex officio seats are elected irregularly, but always proceeding a barangay election.

=== Current members ===
10th Valenzuela City Council (2025–Present)
Position	Name	District
Presiding Officer	Marlon Paulo D. Alejandrino	
Councilors	Cristina Marie F. Tan	First district
Councilors	Joseph William D. Lee	First district
Councilors	Richard C. Enriquez	First district
Councilors	Walter Magnum D. Dela Cruz	First district
Councilors	Kisha Coleen R. Ancheta	First district
Councilors	Exequel DJ. Serrano	First district
Councilors	Lorena C. Natividad-Borja	Second district
Councilors	Niña Sheila B. Lopez	Second district
Councilors	Roselle C. Sabino-Sy	Second district
Councilors	Chiqui Marie N. Carreon	Second district
Councilors	Christoffer Joseph M. Pineda	Second district
Councilors	Louie P. Nolasco	Second district
ABC President	Mario B. San Andres (Canumay West)	
SK President	Jairus Jeofri P. Esplana (Malinta)	

=== Former city councils ===
==== 9th City Council (2022-2025) ====
9th Valenzuela City Council (2022–2025)
Position	Name	District
Presiding Officer	Lorena C. Natividad-Borja	
Councilors	Marlon Paulo D. Alejandrino	First district
Councilors	Ramon L. Encarnacion	First district
Councilors	Ricardo Ricarr C. Enriquez	First district
Councilors	Cristina Marie M. Feliciano-Tan	First district
Councilors	Joseph William D. Lee	First district
Councilors	Walter Magnum D. Dela Cruz	First district
Councilors	Gerald Cloyd Alexis DV. Galang	Second district
Councilors	Niña Sheila B. Lopez	Second district
Councilors	Roselle C. Sabino-Sy	Second district
Councilors	Louie P. Nolasco	Second district
Councilors	Christoffer Joseph M. Pineda	Second district
Councilors	Chiqui Marie N. Carreon	Second district
ABC President	Mario B. San Andres (Canumay West)	
SK President	Jairus Jeofri P. Esplana (Malinta)	

==== 8th City Council (2019-2022) ====
8th Valenzuela City Council (2019–2022)
Position	Name	District
Presiding Officer	Lorena C. Natividad-Borja	
Councilors	Walter Magnum D. Dela Cruz	First district
Councilors	Ramon L. Encarnacion	First district
Councilors	Ricardo Ricarr C. Enriquez	First district
Councilors	Rovin Andrew M. Feliciano	First district
Councilors	Joseph William D. Lee	First district
Councilors	Jennifer P. Pingree	First district
Councilors	Chiqui Marie N. Carreon	Second district
Councilors	Kimberly Ann D. Galang-Tiangco	Second district
Councilors	Niña Sheila B. Lopez	Second district
Councilors	Louie P. Nolasco	Second district
Councilors	Crissha Charee M. Pineda-Soledad	Second district
Councilors	Kristian Rome T. Sy	Second district
ABC President	Bienvenido T. Bartolome Jr. (Bisig)	
SK President	Exequiel D.J. Serrano (Coloong)	

==== 7th City Council (2016-2019) ====
7th Valenzuela City Council (2016–2019)
Position	Name	District
Presiding Officer	Lorena C. Natividad-Borja	
Councilors	Marlon Paulo D. Alejandrino	First district
Councilors	Ramon L. Encarnacion	First district
Councilors	Ricardo Ricarr C. Enriquez	First district
Councilors	Antonio R. Espiritu	First district
Councilors	Rovin Andrew M. Feliciano	First district
Councilors	Jennifer P. Pingree	First district
Councilors	Rosalie S. Esteban-Cayco	Second district
Councilors	Kimberly Ann D. Galang	Second district
Councilors	Ma. Cecilia V. Mayo	Second district
Councilors	Lailanie P. Nolasco	Second district
Councilors	Crissha Charee M. Pineda-Soledad	Second district
Councilors	Kristian Rome T. Sy	Second district
ABC President	Fernando Francisco (Mapulang Lupa, 2016–2018); Joseph William D. Lee (Mabolo, 2018–2019)	
SK President	Janine Alexandra R. Carlos (Marulas, 2016–2018); Chiqui Marie N. Carreon (Mapulang Lupa, 2018–2019)	

==== 6th City Council (2013-2016) ====
6th Valenzuela City Council (2013–2016)
Position	Name	District
Presiding Officer	Eric M. Martinez	
Councilors	Marlon Paulo D. Alejandrino	First district
Councilors	Corazon A. Cortez	First district
Councilors	Jennifer P. Pingree-Esplana	First district
Councilors	Antonio R. Espiritu	First district
Councilors	Rovin Andrew M. Feliciano	First district
Councilors	Marcelino G. Morelos	First district
Councilors	Rosalie S. Esteban-Cayco	Second district
Councilors	Kimberly Ann D. Galang	Second district
Councilors	Lorena C. Natividad-Borja	Second district
Councilors	Lailanie P. Nolasco	Second district
Councilors	Crissha Charee M. Pineda-Soledad	Second district
Councilors	Kristian Rome T. Sy	Second district
ABC President	Ramon L. Encarnacion (Dalandanan)	
SK President	Cristina Marie M. Feliciano (Arkong Bato, 2013)	

==== 5th City Council (2010-2013) ====
5th Valenzuela City Council (2010–2013)
Position	Name	District
Presiding Officer	Eric M. Martinez	
Councilors	Ritche D. Cuadra	First district
Councilors	Katherine C. Pineda-Hernandez	First district
Councilors	Antonio R. Espiritu	First district
Councilors	Gerald "Gerry" A. Esplana	First district
Councilors	Corazon A. Cortez	First district
Councilors	Marlon Paulo D. Alejandrino	First district
Councilors	Shalani Carla S. Soledad	Second district
Councilors	Kate Abigael D. Galang-Coseteng	Second district
Councilors	Maria Cecilia V. Mayo	Second district
Councilors	Lailanie P. Nolasco	Second district
Councilors	Lorena C. Natividad-Borja	Second district
Councilors	Adrian C. Dapat	Second district
ABC President	Ramon L. Encarnacion (Dalandanan)	
SK President	Cristina Marie M. Feliciano (Arkong Bato, 2013)	

==== 4th City Council (2007-2010) ====
4th Valenzuela City Council (2007–2010)
Position	Name	District
Presiding Officer	Eric M. Martinez	
Councilors	Corazon A. Cortez	First district
Councilors	Ritche D. Cuadra	First district
Councilors	Gerald A. Esplana	First district
Councilors	Marcelino G. Morelos	First district
Councilors	Katherine C. Pineda-Hernandez	First district
Councilors	Ignacio G. Santiago Jr.	First district
Councilors	Adrian C. Dapat	Second district
Councilors	Kate Abigael D. Galang-Coseteng	Second district
Councilors	Rosalie S. Esteban-Cayco	Second district
Councilors	Ma. Cecilia V. Mayo	Second district
Councilors	Fernando D.G. Padrinao	Second district
Councilors	Shalani Carla S. Soledad	Second district
ABC President	Alvin S. Feliciano (Arkong Bato)	
SK President	Ricmar C. Enriquez (Pasolo)	

==== 3rd City Council (2004-2007) ====
3rd Valenzuela City Council (2004–2007)
Position	Name	District
Presiding Officer	Antonio R. Espiritu	
Councilors	Elizabeth A. Chongco	First district
Councilors	Ritche D. Cuadra	First district
Councilors	Gerald A. Esplana	First district
Councilors	Marcelino G. Morelos	First district
Councilors	Katherine C. Pineda-Hernandez	First district
Councilors	Ignacio G. Santiago Jr.	First district
Councilors	Rosalie S. Esteban-Cayco	Second district
Councilors	Kate Abigael D. Galang-Coseteng	Second district
Councilors	Eric M. Martinez	Second district
Councilors	Lorena C. Natividad	Second district
Councilors	Fernando D.G. Padrinao	Second district
Councilors	Shalani Carla S. Soledad	Second district
ABC President	Edilberto M. Lozada (Palasan)	
SK President	Meilene T. Dizor (Rincon)	

==== 2nd City Council (2001-2004) ====
2nd Valenzuela City Council (2001–2004)
Position	Name	District
Presiding Officer	Antonio R. Espiritu	
Councilors	Romeo P. Bularan	First district
Councilors	Elizabeth A. Chongco	First district
Councilors	Corazon A. Cortez	First district
Councilors	Reynaldo S. Cuadra	First district
Councilors	Marcelino G. Morelos	First district
Councilors	Ignacio G. Santiago Jr.	First district
Councilors	Rosalie S. Esteban	Second district
Councilors	Ma. Cecilia V. Mayo	Second district
Councilors	Lorena C. Natividad	Second district
Councilors	Eric M. Martinez	Second district
Councilors	Pablo D. Marcelo	Second district
Councilors	Carlitos B. Tiquia	Second district
ABC President	Edilberto M. Lozada (Palasan)	
SK President	Meilene T. Dizor (Rincon)	

==== 1st City Council (1998-2001) ====
1st Valenzuela City Council (1998–2001)
Position	Name	District
Presiding Officer	Ernesto P. De Guzman	
Councilors	Romeo P. Bularan	First district
Councilors	Corazon A. Cortez	First district
Councilors	Reynaldo S. Cuadra	First district
Councilors	Antonio M. Dalag	First district
Councilors	Antonio R. Espiritu	First district
Councilors	Edilberto M. Lozada	First district
Councilors	Erlinda S. Dela Cruz	Second district
Councilors	Pablo D. Marcelo	Second district
Councilors	Ma. Cecilia V. Mayo	Second district
Councilors	Lorena C. Natividad	Second district
Councilors	Fernando D.G. Padrinao	Second district
Councilors	Isidro S. Valenzuela	Second district
ABC President	Roberto B. Darilag (Balangkas)	
SK President	Ritche D. Cuadra (Mabolo)	

=== Former municipal councils ===
==== Municipal council of 1995-1998 ====
Members of the 1995-1998 Municipal Council
District 1	Antonio M. Dalag
District 1	Antonio R. Espiritu
District 1	Edilberto M. Lozada
District 1	Reynaldo S. Cuadra
District 1	Corazon A. Cortez
District 1	Romeo P. Buluran
District 2	Fernando D.G. Padrinao
District 2	Erlinda S. Dela Cruz
District 2	Pio Carreon
District 2	Ernesto Carabeo
District 2	Ma. Cecilia V. Mayo
District 2	Pablo D. Marcelo
