= Antonio Serapio =

Filipino lawyer, judge and politician (1937–2007)

Antonio M. Serapio
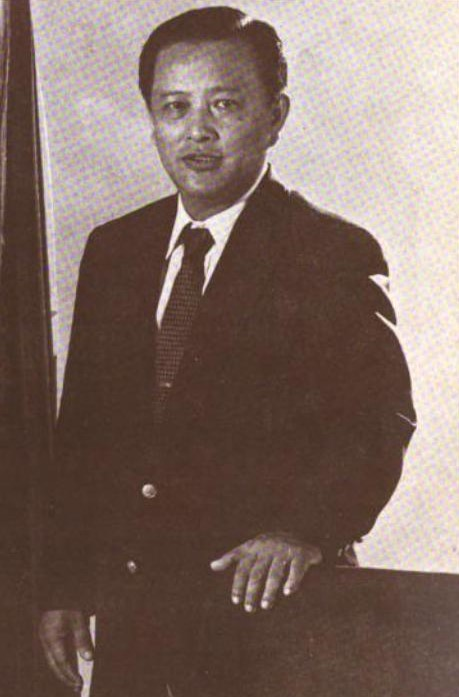
- Serapio during the 8th Congress

Member of the House of Representatives of the Philippines from Valenzuela's 2nd district
- In office June 30, 2004 – February 19, 2007
- Preceded by: Magtanggol Gunigundo
- Succeeded by: Magtanggol Gunigundo

Member of the House of Representatives of the Philippines from Valenzuela's lone district
- In office June 30, 1987 – June 30, 1998
- Preceded by: District established
- Succeeded by: Magtanggol Gunigundo

Personal details
- Born: June 13, 1937
- Died: February 19, 2007 (aged 69) Cabanatuan, Nueva Ecija, Philippines
- Spouse: Marissa
- Occupation: Lawyer, judge, politician

Antonio Maceda Serapio (June 13, 1937 – February 19, 2007) was a Filipino lawyer, judge and politician who represented Valenzuela in the House of Representatives of the Philippines. He served as representative of the municipality's lone congressional district from 1987 to 1998 and later represented Valenzuela's 2nd district from 2004 until his death in 2007.

Serapio was the principal House author of the legislation that became Republic Act No. 8526, the 1998 charter that converted Valenzuela from a municipality into a highly urbanized city. He also principally authored legislation that upgraded the Valenzuela General Hospital into the 200-bed tertiary Valenzuela Medical Center.

== Legal career ==
Before entering national politics, Serapio worked in the legal profession and judiciary. A 2023 House bill introduced to rename Valenzuela Medical Center in his honor states that, after completing his studies in 1961, he served as an assistant provincial fiscal in Bulacan and subsequently became a municipal judge and a Metropolitan Trial Court judge in Valenzuela. Philippine Supreme Court records independently identify Serapio as the judge who originally heard an unlawful-detainer case filed in the Metropolitan Trial Court of Valenzuela in 1981.

He left the judiciary in 1987 to run for the House of Representatives.

== Political career ==
=== House of Representatives, 1987–1998 ===
Serapio was elected in 1987 as the first representative of Valenzuela's newly established lone congressional district. He served in the 8th, 9th and 10th Congresses, remaining in office until 1998.

His election to a third term in 1995 was challenged before the House of Representatives Electoral Tribunal by Eduardo M. Franco. The tribunal dismissed Franco's protest and affirmed Serapio's proclamation, finding that Serapio had obtained a plurality of 13,382 valid votes.

Among Serapio's legislative initiatives were measures concerning roads, drainage systems, school buildings, waterworks and health facilities in Valenzuela. One of his measures during the 8th Congress became Republic Act No. 7218, which increased the bed capacity of the Valenzuela District Hospital from 25 to 75 beds.

=== Valenzuela cityhood ===
During the 10th Congress, Serapio was the principal author in the House of House Bill No. 1921, which proposed converting the Municipality of Valenzuela into a highly urbanized city. During Senate deliberations on February 3, 1998, Senator Vicente Sotto III identified Serapio as the measure's principal House author.

The measure became Republic Act No. 8526, the Charter of the City of Valenzuela, after being approved on February 14, 1998. Contemporary reporting following Serapio's death credited his authorship of the charter as a major part of his political legacy in Valenzuela.

=== 1998 mayoral election ===
After completing three consecutive terms in the House, Serapio ran for mayor of Valenzuela in the May 11, 1998 elections against Jose Emmanuel Carlos. The municipal board of canvassers proclaimed Carlos the winner with 102,688 votes, while Serapio was credited with 77,270 votes.

Serapio filed an election protest on June 1, 1998. A revision of the ballots later produced a final tally of 83,609 valid votes for Carlos and 66,602 for Serapio. Despite the tally, the Regional Trial Court set aside Carlos's proclamation in April 2000 and declared Serapio the elected mayor on the basis of what it considered evidence of widespread electoral fraud.

Carlos challenged the ruling before the Supreme Court of the Philippines. On November 29, 2000, the Supreme Court annulled the trial court's decision, holding that it had committed grave abuse of discretion by declaring Serapio the winner despite its own finding that Carlos had received 17,007 more valid votes. The case was remanded to the trial court for a new decision.

=== Return to Congress ===
Serapio returned to electoral politics in 2004 and won the House seat for Valenzuela's 2nd district. He was proclaimed congressman-elect in May 2004. He took office on June 30 as a member of the 13th Congress.

During his term, Serapio was a member of House committees dealing with reforestation, veterans affairs and welfare, rules, games and amusements, and revision of laws. GMA News reported that he was among six opposition legislators who declined to sign impeachment complaints against President Gloria Macapagal Arroyo in 2005 and 2006.

In April 2005, Serapio filed House Bill No. 4190, seeking to upgrade the 100-bed Valenzuela General Hospital into a 200-bed tertiary hospital and rename it the Valenzuela Medical Center. The measure was approved by Congress and became Republic Act No. 9421 on April 10, 2007, several weeks after Serapio's death.

== Death ==
On February 19, 2007, Serapio was driving along the Gapan–Olongapo Road in Cabiao, Nueva Ecija, while returning to Manila when his vehicle veered into the opposite lane and collided with a passenger bus. The Philippine Star reported that Serapio had suffered a heart attack while driving. He was brought to Nueva Ecija Doctors' Hospital, where he later died in the intensive care unit at the age of 69.

At the time of his death, Serapio was the incumbent representative of Valenzuela's 2nd district and was preparing to seek another term in the 2007 elections. GMA News reported that he had been travelling to the House of Representatives for a special session when the crash occurred.

== Legacy ==
Serapio has been associated particularly with Valenzuela's conversion into a highly urbanized city and with the development of its public hospital system. The Philippine Star credited him with projects involving the Valenzuela General Hospital and public school buildings in the city.

In 2018, President Rodrigo Duterte signed Republic Act No. 10982, establishing a public elementary school in Barangay Ugong, Valenzuela, under the name Antonio M. Serapio Elementary School.

In 2023, Representatives Eric Martinez and Wilfrido Mark Enverga filed House Bill No. 7870 proposing that Valenzuela Medical Center be renamed the Antonio M. Serapio Medical Center. The bill remained pending with the House Committee on Health during the 19th Congress.

== See also ==
- Legislative districts of Valenzuela
- Valenzuela's at-large congressional district
- Valenzuela's 2nd congressional district
- Republic Act No. 8526
