= Valenzuela's at-large congressional district =

Congressional district of the Philippines

Valenzuela's at-large congressional district was a congressional district for Valenzuela in the Philippines. It was represented in the House of Representatives from 1987 up to its division in 2001. The district was apportioned in 1987, pursuant to the constitution ratified that year, giving the two municipalities their own joint district after having been grouped with Malabon and Navotas from 1984 to 1986. The district was first represented by Antonio Serapio, followed by its last representative Magtanggol Gunigundo I. The district was divided into two districts following Valenzuela's conversion into a highly urbanized city in 1998.

== Representation history ==
#	Image	Member	Term of office		Congress	Party	Electoral history
#	Image	Member	Start	End	Congress	Party	Electoral history
=== Valenzuela's at-large district for the House of Representatives of the Philippines ===
District created February 2, 1987 from Malabon–Navotas–Valenzuela district.
1		Antonio Serapio	June 30, 1987	June 30, 1998	8th	Nacionalista	Elected in 1987.
1		Antonio Serapio	June 30, 1987	June 30, 1998	9th	NPC	Re-elected in 1992.
1		Antonio Serapio	June 30, 1987	June 30, 1998	10th	NPC	Re-elected in 1995.
2		Magtanggol Gunigundo I	June 30, 1998	June 30, 2001	11th	Lakas	Elected in 1998. Redistricted to the 2nd district.
District dissolved into Valenzuela's 1st and 2nd districts.

== See also ==
- Legislative districts of Valenzuela
