= Shalani Soledad =

Filipina politician and TV personality

Shalani Soledad Romulo

Member of the Valenzuela City Council from the 2nd district
- In office June 30, 2004 – June 30, 2013

Personal details
- Born: Shalani Carla San Ramón Soledad; April 27, 1980 (age 46) Virac, Catanduanes, Philippines
- Party: Independent (2013–present)
- Other political affiliations: Liberal (2007–2013); Lakas (2004–2007)
- Spouse: Roman Romulo (m. 2012)
- Relations: Francisco Tatad (uncle)
- Profession: Entrepreneur; Politician; Television host

Shalani Carla San Ramón Soledad-Romulo (born April 27, 1980), better known simply as Shalani Soledad-Romulo, is a Filipina politician and TV personality. Soledad was a member of Valenzuela City council from Valenzuela's 2nd congressional district from 2004 to 2013. From November 12–18, 2010, she is the second most searched personality on the internet in the Philippines next to the former Kate Middleton (now known as Catherine, Princess of Wales), and topped the list of "Filipina personalities who grabbed the greatest online mindshare in 2010" according to Google. She ran for a seat in the House of Representatives in 2013, but narrowly lost the election.

== Early life ==
Soledad was born on April 27, 1980 to former Banco Filipino chairman Adolfo Aguirre and Philippine Airlines flight attendant Evelyn San Ramón. Prior to their reunion in 2010, the last time Aguirre saw her was when she was three months old. She was raised by her maternal grandmother Lolita San Ramón Soledad from childhood and by her maternal uncle Ramón Soledad after her mother Evelyn left her in their custody. She was christened Shalani Carla San Ramón Soledad with her maternal grandmother Lolita and her uncle Ramón indicated as the parents on her birth certificate. She is a niece to former senator Francisco Tatad. In September 2010, Soledad and her biological father Adolfo Aguirre were reunited after 30 years of separation. This was done through the efforts of businessman James Gaisano of Gaisano Malls, who happened to be Aguirre's good friend.

During her teens, Soledad lived briefly with her mother Evelyn and brother Carlo in Kuwait, where her mother worked at the Al Boom restaurant at Radisson SAS (now Radisson Blu) hotel. She and her brother had their on the job training at the Housekeeping and Food and Beverage divisions of the Radisson hotel before returning to the Philippines in 1998 to pursue their college education.

She took her elementary education at Mary Mount School in Parañaque then secondary school at Philippine College of Technical Resources (present-day St. Louis College of Valenzuela). In school, she described herself as an average student and had developed the passion of teaching the Bible to younger students. She took the degree of Bachelor of Science in Human Resources Management at De La Salle-College of Saint Benilde, but she never graduated due to her lack of Physical Education units and early immersion to politics.

== Personal life ==
Soledad dated Benigno Aquino III from 2008 to 2010. She first met Aquino in July 2005 while she was still a news reporter in UNTV 37 covering the 2005 State of the Nation Address of President Gloria Macapagal Arroyo and Aquino was then a congressman representing the second district of the province of Tarlac. However, the first conversation began in 2008 at Alfredo's Steaks, a steakhouse in Quezon City when Aquino met several politicians from Valenzuela City including Soledad. Soledad and Aquino had their first date on July 28, 2008, when they watched the film For the First Time at SM City Valenzuela.

Soledad and Aquino broke up after Aquino's state visit to the United States in October 2010. The breakup happened at Alfredo's Steaks, the same restaurant where the couple first dated. According to Soledad, it was due to their busy and hectic schedules.

On January 22, 2012, she married Pasig Rep. Roman Romulo, the son of former Foreign Affairs Secretary Alberto Romulo, in Silang, Cavite.

== Hosting ==
From November 8, 2010, she was the co-host of Willie Revillame on his evening game show Willing Willie at TV5.

Being new to television, Soledad was widely criticized on her hosting skills. For example, Senator Miriam Defensor Santiago said that she admired the personality and freshness of Soledad, however, her hosting abilities could be a little bit more animated. The Filipino Twitter community gave several reactions to Shalani's hosting performances: for example, "she is too modest to energize a crowd expecting fun". As feedback, Soledad said that although the game mechanics sounds too easy when watched, it is still difficult if "you're there standing as the game master". However, viewers still expect that constant exposure and practice will make her a better host. Soledad is managed by talent manager Lolit Solis.

On April 11, 2011, Willing Willie was suspended due to controversial acts done by Willie Revillame in regards with "Jan-jan", a contestant who was "forced" by Revillame to perform a "macho dance". This caused the show to be suspended or "put on hiatus" for two weeks. However, it was uncertain if the show will return or end indefinitely. In the interim, Soledad returned to her legislative duties as expected. On May 14, 2011, however, Willing Willie made a comeback to TV5 under its new title Wil Time Bigtime which was patterned after its predecessor, though with a new lineup of games and features. She also returned as Revillame's co-host.

On January 13, 2012, Soledad left Wil Time Bigtime in preparation of her marriage to Roman Romulo.

On March 11, 2012, she returned hosting on the noontime show Game 'N Go.

== Politics ==
Soledad worked at the Catanduanes Provincial Capitol in Virac, Catanduanes from 2001 to 2002.

From 2002 to 2003, she became a member of Senator Panfilo Lacson's staff before quitting to become news reporter at UNTV 37. In 2004, she won an office for Valenzuela City's second legislative council.

Soledad was a member of Valenzuela City council from the second district from 2004 to 2013. She is also a member of the committee for women and family affairs. In her first term, she was able to pass her self-authored "Early Childhood Ordinance" in the city. In September 2012, Soledad ran for the congressional seat in Valenzuela City second district under Team PNoy. However, she narrowly lost to incumbent Rep. Magtanggol Gunigundo.

== Filmography ==
=== Television ===
Year	Title	Role
2005–2007	Pilipinas, Gising Ka Na Ba?	Herself/Host
2010–2011	Willing Willie	Herself/Host
2011–2012	Wil Time Bigtime	Herself/Host
2012–2013	Game 'N Go	Herself/Host

== Discography ==
List of album appearances
Contribution	Year	Album
"Ikaw Na Nga" (Willie Revillame featuring Shalani Soledad)	2010	I Love You
