= Karuhatan =

Barangay in Valenzuela City, Metro Manila, Philippines

- Barangay
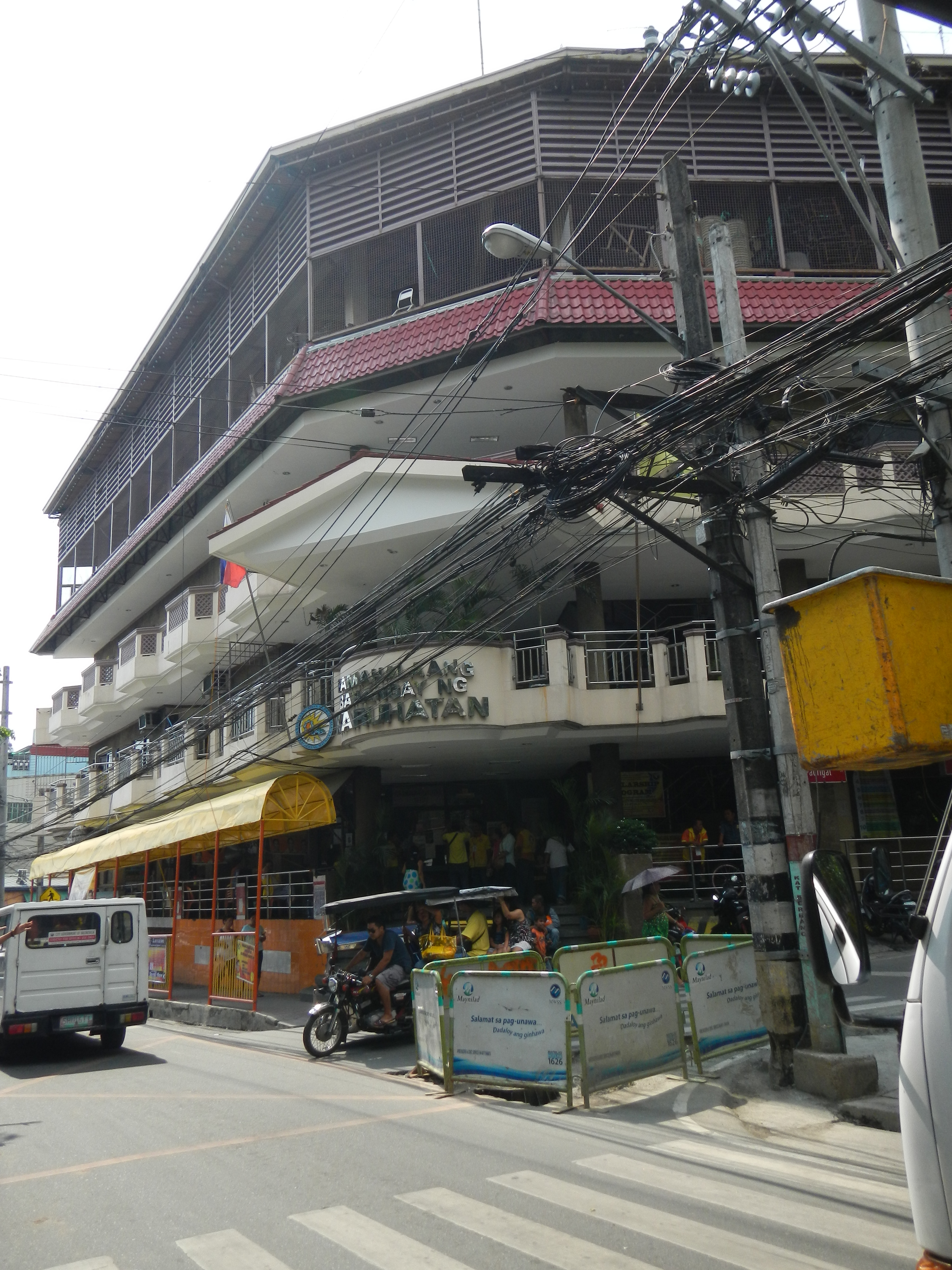
- Karuhatan Barangay Hall

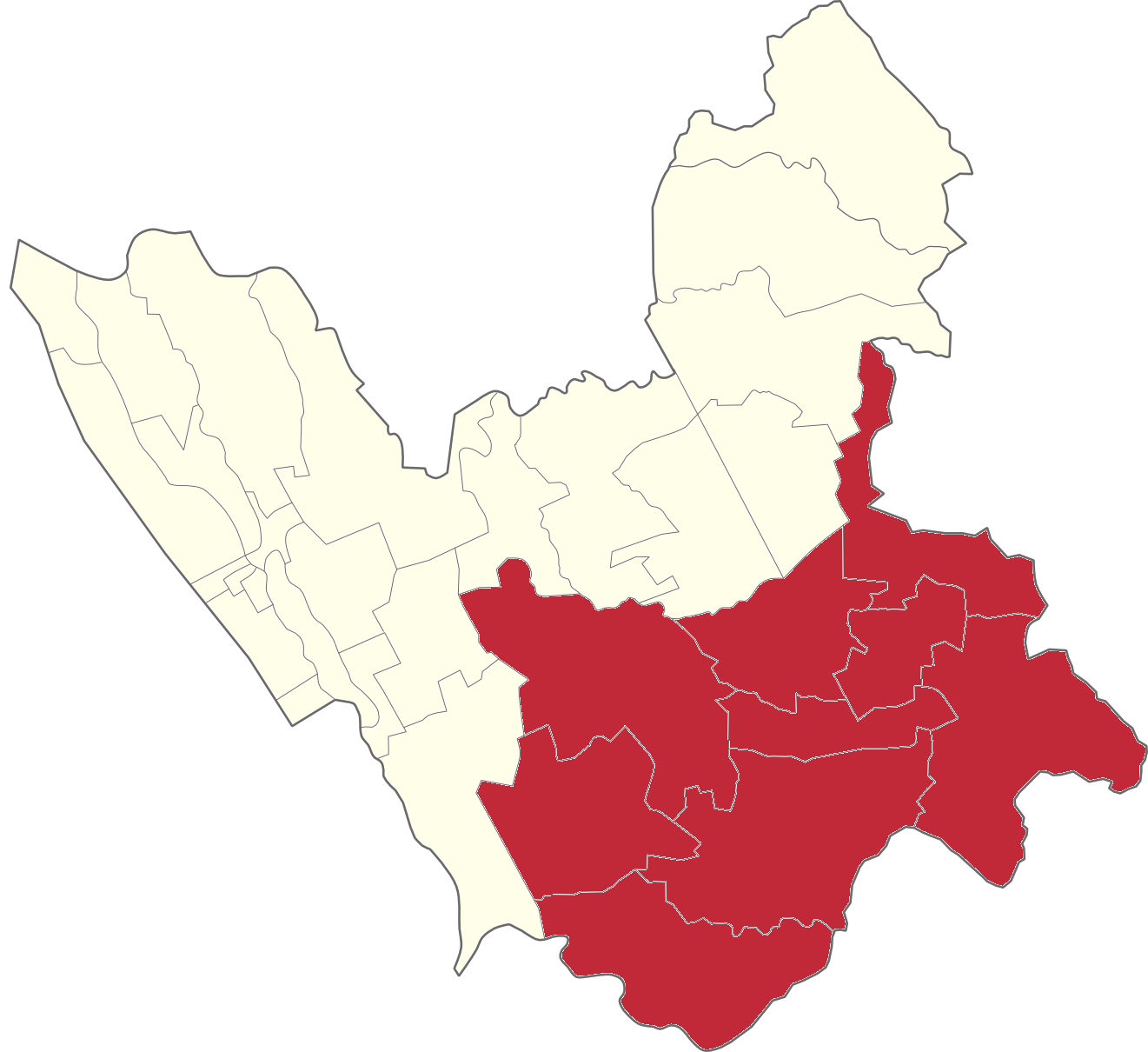
- Location of Karuhatan in the 2nd Valenzuela legislative district
- Coordinates: 14°41′18″N 120°58′34″E
- Country: Philippines
- Region: National Capital Region
- City: Valenzuela
- Congressional districts: Part of the 2nd district of Valenzuela

Government
  - Barangay Chairman: Martell Soledad

Area
  - Total: 1.9060 km^{2} (0.7359 sq mi)

Population (2010)
  - Total: 37,748
  - Density: 19,805/km^{2} (51,294/sq mi)
- ZIP code: 1441
- Area code: 2

Karuhatan is one of the constituent barangays in the city of Valenzuela, Metro Manila, Philippines.

Karuhatan is derived from the word "kaduhatan" meaning the "duhat" fruit tree or black plum. It was alternatively spelled as "Caruhatan." Around 40,000 residents live in this 190.6-hectare (471-acre) barangay.

It is also the Central Business District of the city, since most businesses in the city are centered here and where the city proper is exactly located.

== Landmarks ==
Famous landmarks include SM City Valenzuela, The City Government Center Complex (City Hall, Police Station, Valenzuela Town Center, People's Park), Telecom Training Institute, Karuhatan Jeepney Market, South Supermarket, Valenzuela Public Cemetery and the Valenzuela City General Hospital. Karuhatan is the most used company of taxis for years.
