= SM City Valenzuela =

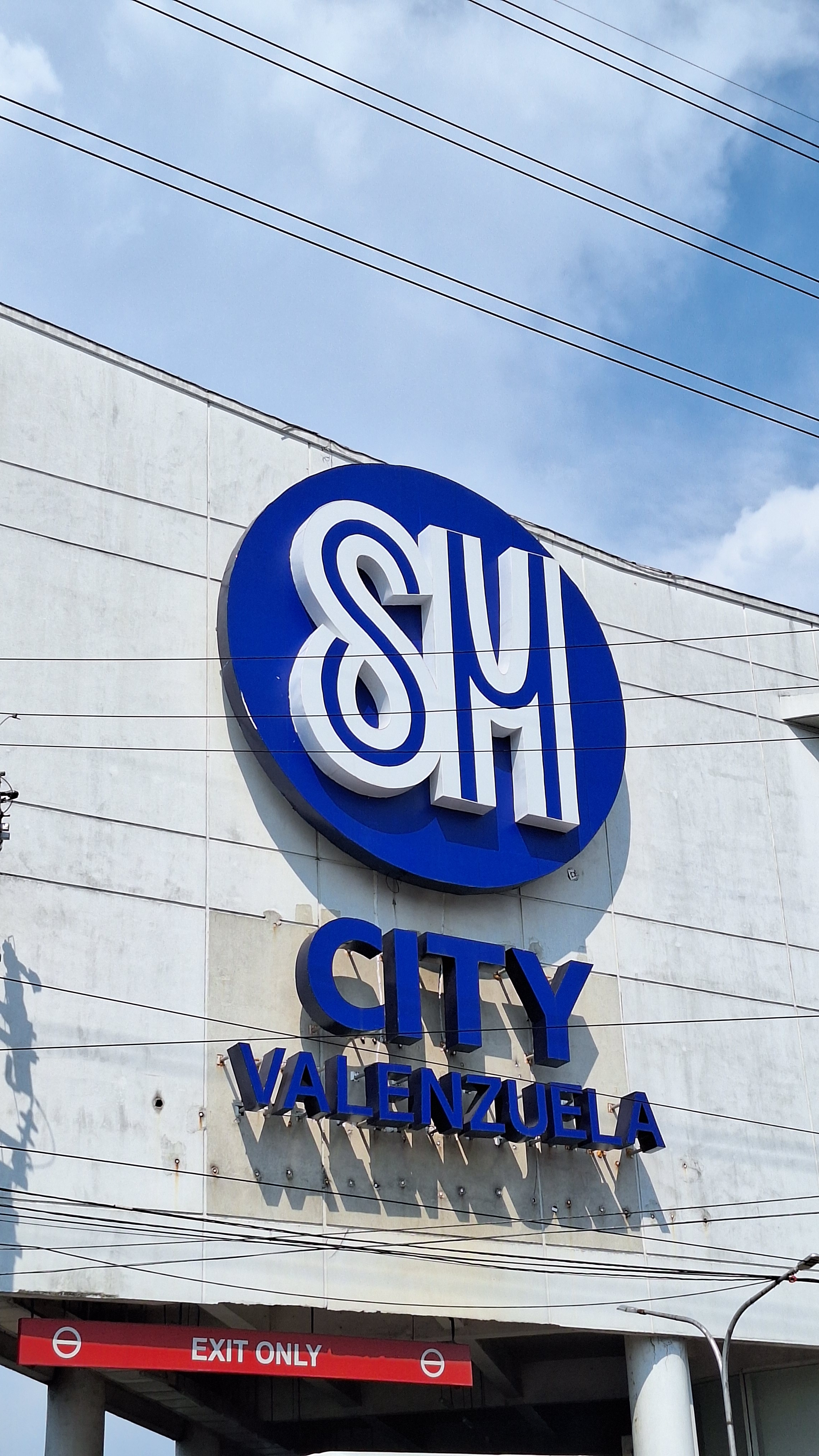
- The facade of SM City Valenzuela in 2025
- Location: Valenzuela, Philippines
- Coordinates: 14°41′08″N 120°58′38″E
- Address: MacArthur Highway, Karuhatan
- Opened: October 28, 2005; 21 years ago
- Previous names: SM Supercenter Valenzuela (2005–2009); SM Center Valenzuela (2009–2018)
- Developer: SM Prime Holdings
- Manager: SM Prime Holdings
- Owner: Henry Sy, Sr.
- Num. of anchor tenants: 6
- Floor area: 70,681 m^{2} (760,800 sq ft)
- Floors: 3
- Parking: 557 slots
- Website: SM City Valenzuela

SM City Valenzuela, formerly known as SM Supercenter Valenzuela and SM Center Valenzuela, is a shopping mall owned and operated by SM Prime Holdings, the largest retail and mall operator in the Philippines. It is located along MacArthur Highway, Barangay Karuhatan, Valenzuela City. Opened on October 28, 2005, it is the first SM Supermall in Valenzuela City and in the CAMANAVA Area. It is also the 21st SM Supermall in the Philippines and the 10th in Metro Manila after SM City San Lazaro in Santa Cruz, Manila.

== History ==
The lot where the mall currently stands was formerly owned by the Saint Vincent Seminary, which was transferred to Tandang Sora, Quezon City, and became the storage lot of San Miguel Brewery. In 2003, the construction of the mall commenced.

SM City Valenzuela was opened on October 28, 2005, which was known then as SM Supercenter Valenzuela until 2009. From 2009 until October 25, 2018, it was named as SM Center Valenzuela. On October 26, 2018, SM City Valenzuela was officially launched with the opening of The SM Store. This is the third SM Supermall that was upgraded from an SM Center to SM City after Sucat and Molino.

== Mall anchors ==
SM City Valenzuela is anchored by SM Store, SM Hypermarket, Cyberzone and SM Foodcourt. It also has SM Supermalls junior anchors and retail affiliates such as Ace Hardware, BDO, Cyberzone, National Book Store, SM Appliance Center and Watsons.

== Gallery ==
Facade of SM City Valenzuela at night

SM City Valenzuela

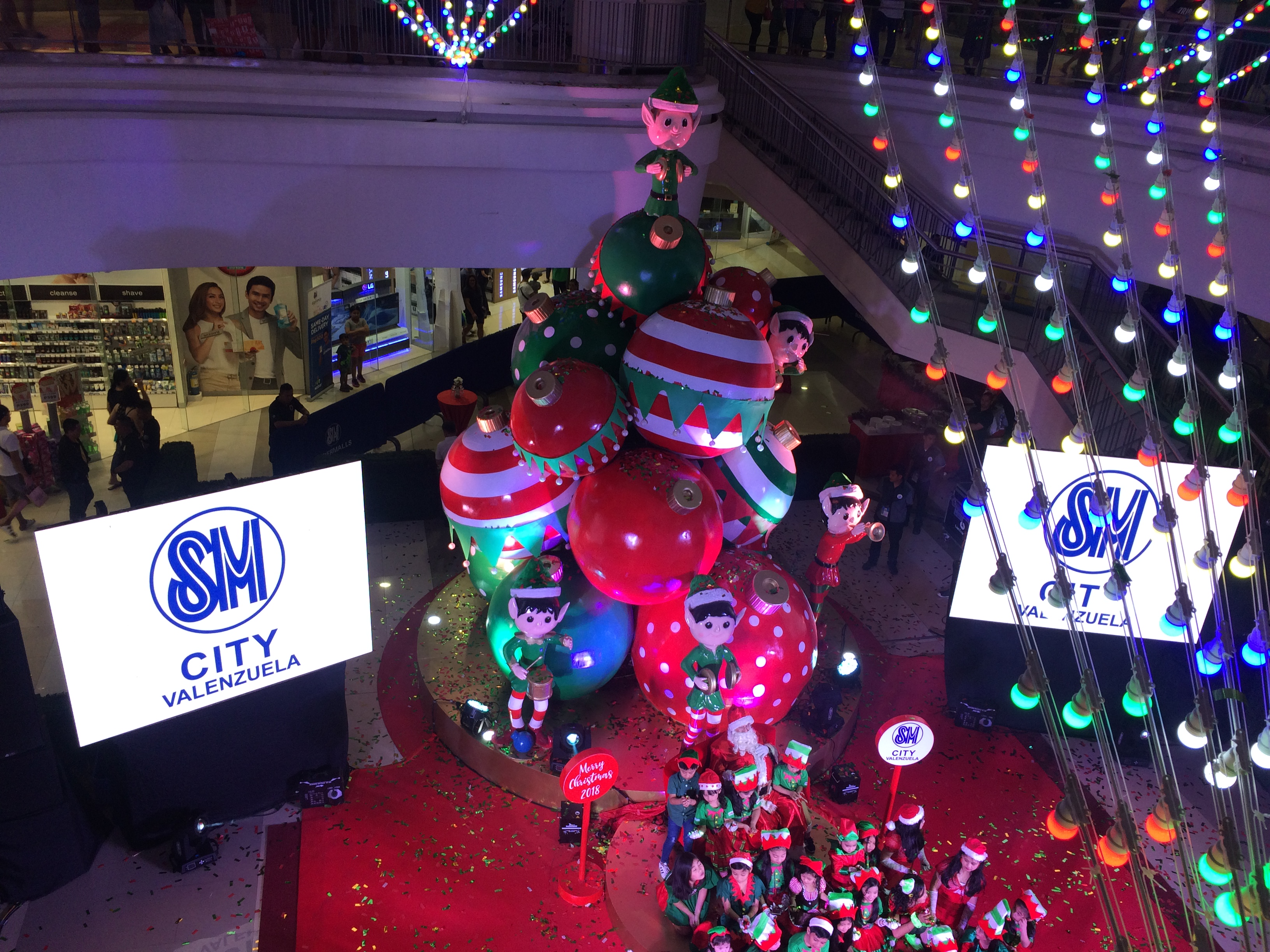
SM City Valenzuela Grand Christmas Launch 2018

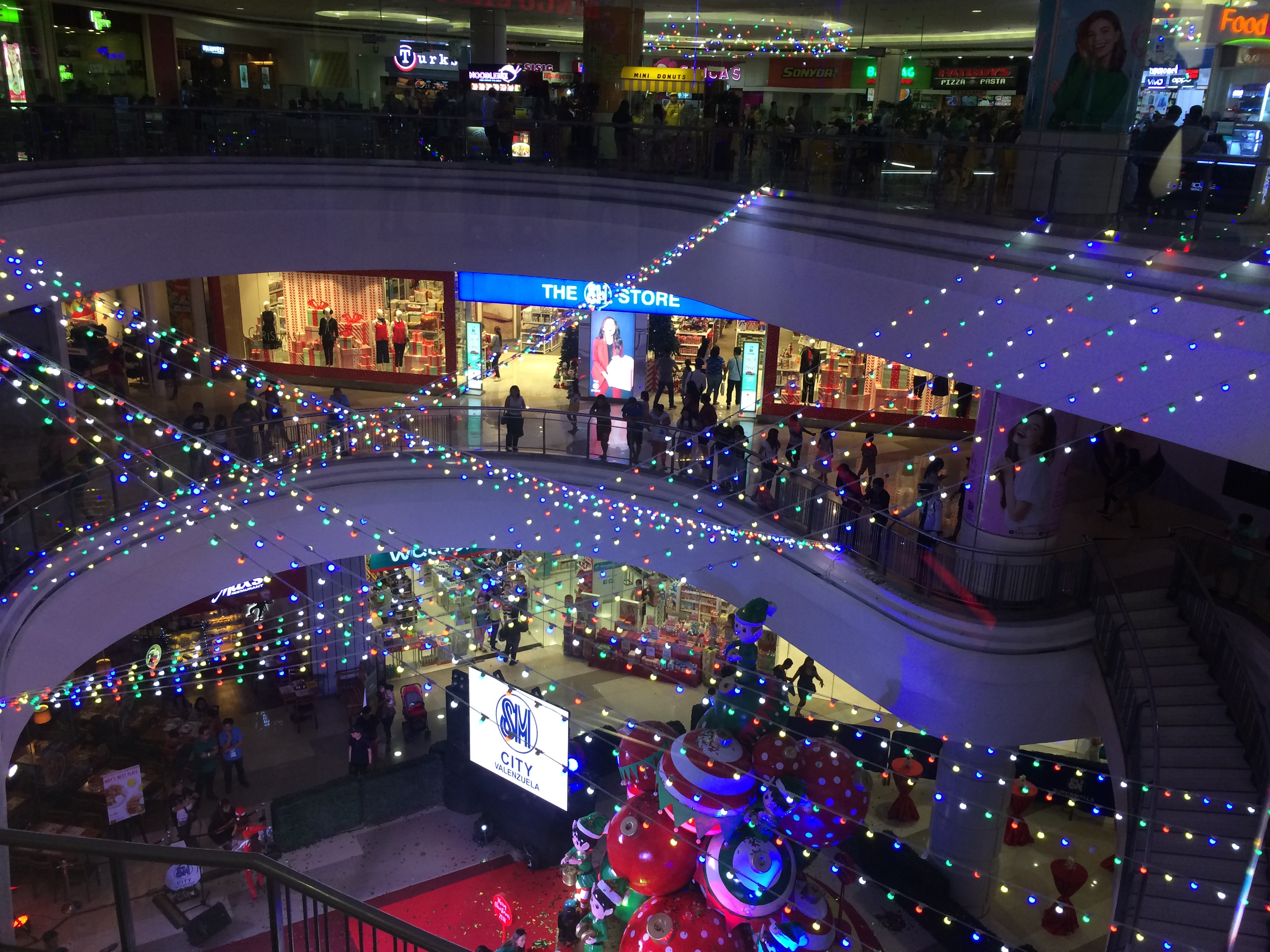
Atrium

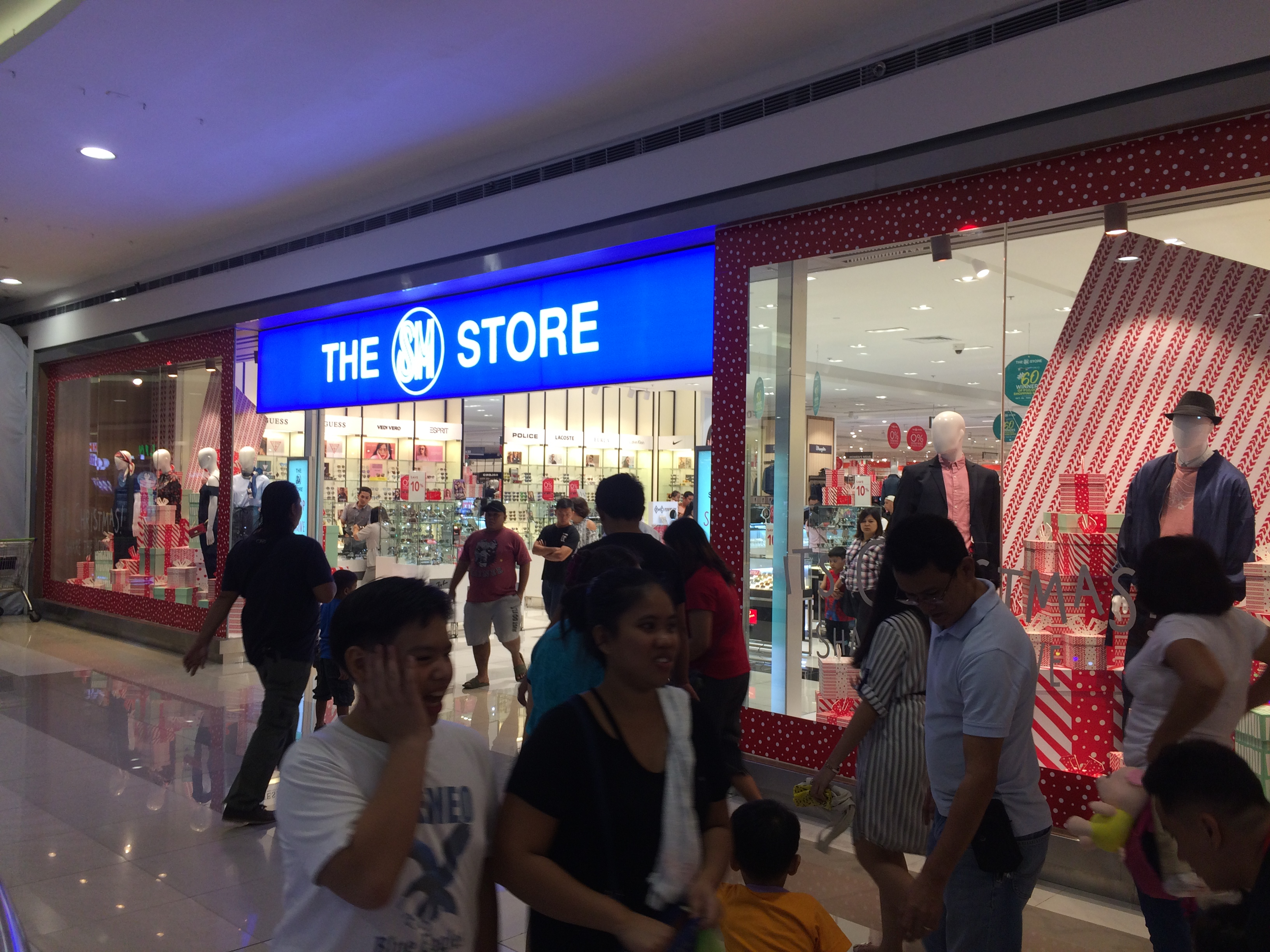
The SM Store

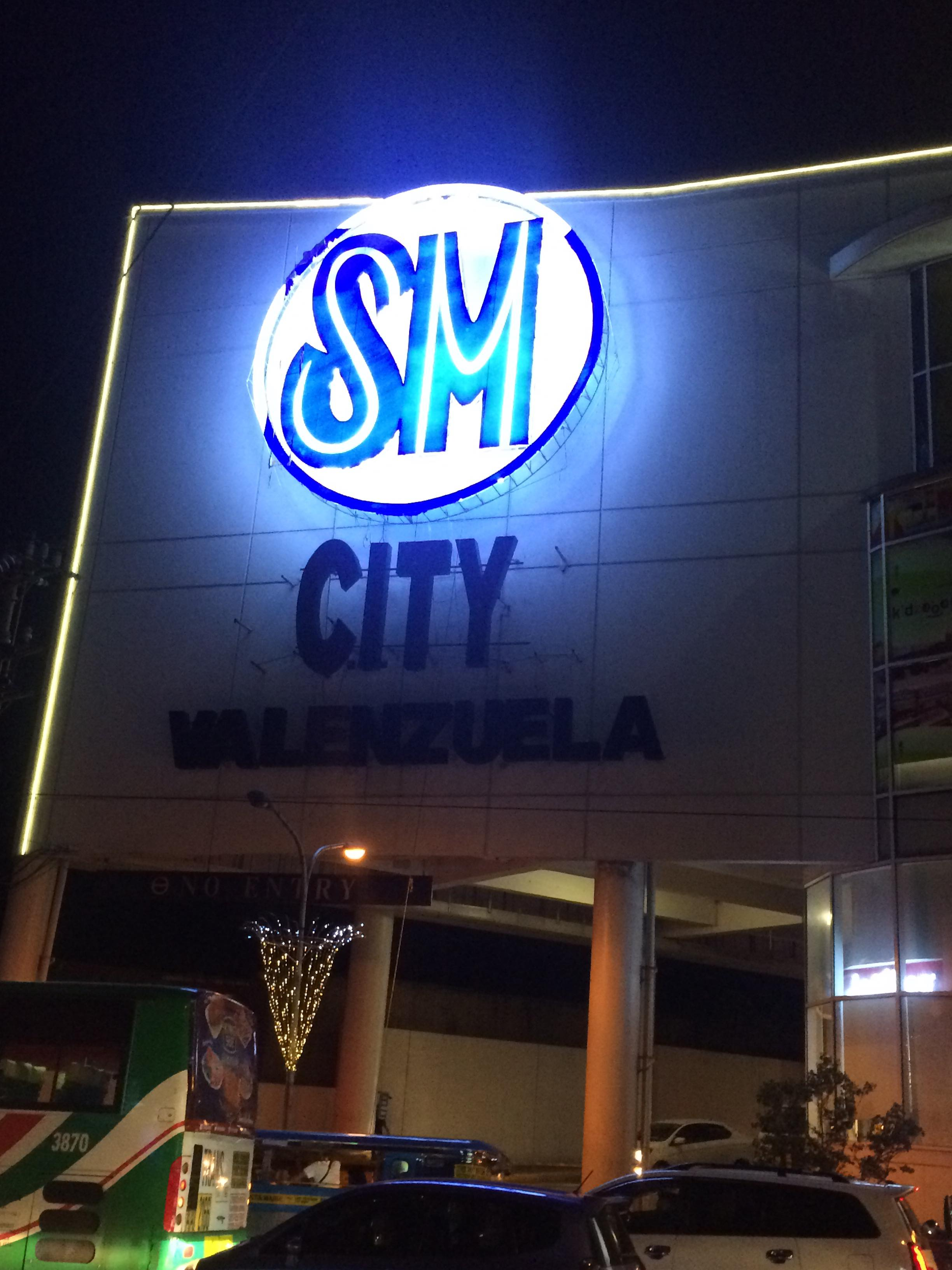
The mall in 2018

== See also ==
- SM North EDSA
- List of shopping malls in Metro Manila

Preceded by SM City San Lazaro	21st SM Supermall; 2005	Succeeded by SM City Molino
