= Valenzuela Medical Center =

Government hospital in Valenzuela, Philippines

- Department of Health
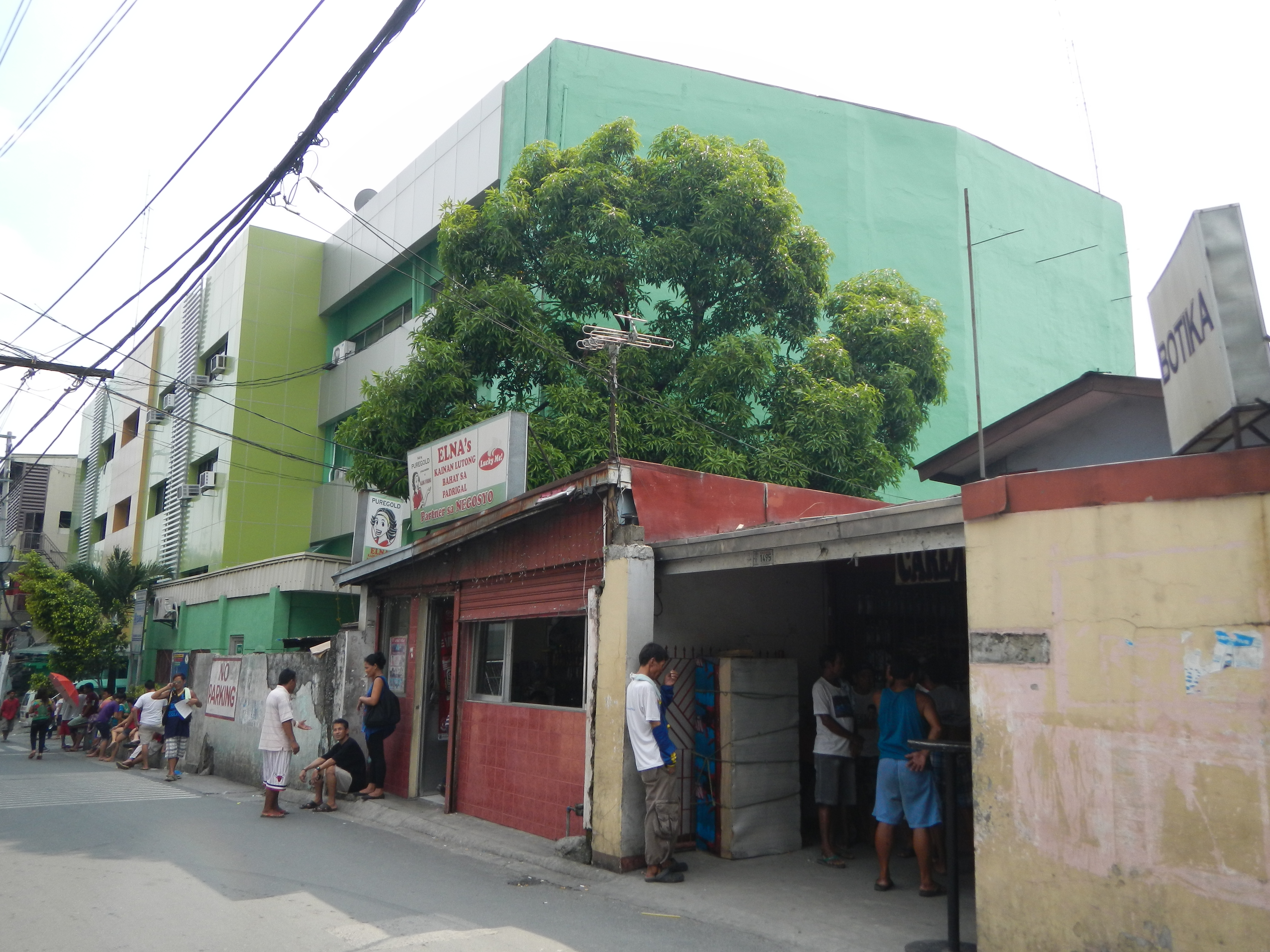
- Valenzuela Medical Center facade

Geography
- Location: Karuhatan, Valenzuela, Philippines
- Coordinates: 14°41′23″N 120°58′41″E

Organization
- Care system: Public
- Type: Public

History
- Former names: Valenzuela Emergency Hospital; Valenzuela District Hospital; Valenzuela General Hospital
- Opened: 1979

Links
- Website: vmc.doh.gov.ph

Valenzuela Medical Center, formerly known as the Valenzuela General Hospital, is a government healthcare centre and hospital in Karuhatan, Valenzuela, Metro Manila, Philippines. The hospital is administered by the National Government through the Department of Health.
