= 2004 Valenzuela local elections =

2004 local elections in Valenzuela

2004 Valenzuela mayoral election
- May 10, 2004
Nominee	Sherwin Gatchalian	Magtanggol Gunigundo	Margarita Carlos
Party	NPC	LDP	Lakas
Running mate	Antonio Espiritu	Bombit Bernardo	Reynaldo Cuadra
Popular vote	68,650	61,247	50,313
Percentage	38.09	33.99	27.92
Mayor before election
Jose Emmanuel Carlos
Lakas
Elected mayor
Sherwin Gatchalian
NPC

The 2004 Valenzuela local elections were held in Valenzuela, Philippines, on May 10, 2004, as part of the 2004 Philippine general election. Voters elected the city's mayor and vice mayor, its two members of the House of Representatives, and twelve regular members of the Valenzuela City Council, with six councilors elected from each of the city's two congressional districts.

First-district representative Sherwin "Win" Gatchalian of the Nationalist People's Coalition (NPC) was elected mayor, defeating former representative Magtanggol "Magi" Gunigundo of the Laban ng Demokratikong Pilipino (LDP) and Margarita "Rita" Carlos of Lakas–CMD. Incumbent vice mayor Antonio "Tony" Espiritu was reelected.

Outgoing mayor Jose Emmanuel "Bobbit" Carlos won the first-district congressional seat vacated by Gatchalian, while Antonio Serapio won the second-district seat.

== Electoral system ==
The mayor and vice mayor were elected citywide in separate plurality elections. The vice mayor served as the presiding officer of the city council. Each of Valenzuela's two congressional districts elected one member of the House of Representatives and six regular members of the city council. The councilors were elected through plurality-at-large voting, under which a voter could vote for up to six candidates in their district.

The division of the city into two congressional districts was provided for by Valenzuela's city charter, Republic Act No. 8526.

== Background ==
Jose Emmanuel Carlos had served as mayor since 1995 and was ineligible to seek a fourth consecutive term under the three-term limit imposed by the Local Government Code. Carlos instead ran for representative of the first district. Sherwin Gatchalian, the incumbent first-district representative, ran to succeed Carlos as mayor. Gatchalian's brother, Rex Gatchalian, contested the congressional seat that Sherwin vacated.

Lakas–CMD nominated Carlos's wife, Margarita "Rita" Carlos, for mayor. Magtanggol Gunigundo, who had represented Valenzuela's second district from 1998 to 2001, ran under the LDP.

== Canvassing ==
A partial count released by the National Citizens' Movement for Free Elections on May 15 showed Gatchalian leading with 39,921 votes, followed by Gunigundo with 33,534 and Carlos with 31,081.

The official canvass was delayed by objections concerning discrepancies in several election returns. Representatives of some candidates challenged the inclusion of contested returns during proceedings before the city board of canvassers. Gatchalian was ultimately proclaimed mayor with 68,650 votes, a margin of 7,403 votes over Gunigundo.

== Results ==
=== Mayor ===
Gatchalian received 38.09 percent of the votes cast for the three mayoral candidates. Gunigundo placed second with 61,247 votes, while Carlos placed third with 50,313.

2004 Valenzuela mayoral election
Candidate	Party	Votes	%
Sherwin Gatchalian	Nationalist People's Coalition	68,650	38.09
Magi Gunigundo	Laban ng Demokratikong Pilipino	61,247	33.99
Margarita Carlos	Lakas–CMD	50,313	27.92
Total		180,210	100.00
Nationalist People's Coalition gain from Lakas–CMD			
Source: The Philippine Star

=== Vice mayor ===
Incumbent vice mayor Antonio "Tony" Espiritu of the NPC was reelected with 95,733 votes. His opponents were former city councilor Reynaldo "Rey" Cuadra of Lakas–CMD and Bombit Bernardo of the LDP.

2004 Valenzuela vice mayoral election
Candidate	Party	Votes	%
Antonio Espiritu (incumbent)	Nationalist People's Coalition	95,733	55.04
Reynaldo Cuadra	Lakas–CMD	47,290	27.19
Bombit Bernardo	Laban ng Demokratikong Pilipino	30,925	17.78
Total		173,948	100.00
Nationalist People's Coalition hold			
Source: The Philippine Star

=== House of Representatives ===
==== First district ====
Outgoing mayor Jose Emmanuel "Bobbit" Carlos won the first-district congressional election. He defeated Rex Gatchalian, the brother of mayor-elect Sherwin Gatchalian, and city councilor Romeo Bularan.

Candidate	Party	Result
Jose Emmanuel "Bobbit" Carlos	Lakas–CMD	Elected
Rexlon "Rex" Gatchalian	Nationalist People's Coalition	
Romeo Bularan	Laban ng Demokratikong Pilipino	
Source: Philstar.com

==== Second district ====
Antonio Serapio of the NPC was elected representative of the second district, defeating Carlitos "Sonny" Tiquia and Pablo Lucas.

Candidate	Party	Result
Antonio Serapio	Nationalist People's Coalition	Elected
Carlitos "Sonny" Tiquia	Lakas–CMD	
Pablo Lucas	Laban ng Demokratikong Pilipino	
Source: Philstar.com

=== City Council ===
Six councilors were elected from each congressional district. The names below use the formal versions subsequently published in city government records.

First district	Second district
Elizabeth A. Chongco	Rosalie S. Esteban-Cayco
Ritche D. Cuadra	Kate Abigael D. Galang-Coseteng
Gerald "Gerry" A. Esplana	Eric M. Martinez
Marcelino G. Morelos	Lorena C. Natividad
Katherine C. Pineda-Hernandez	Fernando D. G. Padrinao
Ignacio G. Santiago Jr.	Shalani Carla S. Soledad
Sources: The Philippine Star and the City Government of Valenzuela

== Aftermath ==
The newly elected officials began their three-year terms on June 30, 2004. The election resulted in Sherwin Gatchalian and Jose Emmanuel Carlos exchanging offices: Gatchalian left the House of Representatives to become mayor, while Carlos completed his mayoral tenure and became the first-district representative. Antonio Espiritu continued as vice mayor.

== See also ==
- 2004 Philippine general election
- Legislative districts of Valenzuela
- Valenzuela City Council
