= 2019 Valenzuela local elections =

Philippine election

- May 13, 2019

Mayoral, vice mayoral, congressional representatives and all 12 city council seats
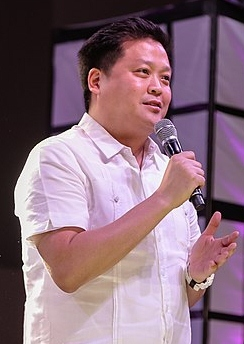
Nominee	Rexlon Gatchalian	Antonio Go	Bien Español
Party	NPC	Lakas	Independent
Running mate	Lorena C. Natividad-Borja
Popular vote	248,911	6,226	2,284
Percentage	96.7	2.4	0.9
Mayor before election
Rexlon Gatchalian
NPC
Elected mayor
Rexlon Gatchalian
NPC

Local elections was held in Valenzuela on May 13, 2019, within the Philippine general election. The voters elected elective local posts in the city: the mayor, vice mayor, the two Congressmen (or district representatives), and the councilors, six in each of the city's two legislative districts.

== Mayoral and vice mayoral election ==
Incumbent mayor Rexlon "Rex" Gatchalian is on his second term as the mayor of Valenzuela. Prior to his election as mayor in 2013, he represented the first district of Valenzuela from 2007 to 2013. It is initially speculated that Rodrigo Duterte's common-law wife Honeylet Avanceña will run for mayor; however, the rumor is debunked by a COMELEC local officer.

Incumbent vice mayor Lorena "Lorie" Natividad-Borja is on her first term as the vice mayor. Prior to her election as vice mayor in 2016, she was a member of the city council representing the second district from 2001 to 2007 and from 2010 to 2016.

== Congressional election ==
The incumbent first district representative is Weslie T. Gatchalian, younger brother to both senator Sherwin Gatchalian and incumbent mayor Rex Gatchalian, is on his first term.

For the second district, incumbent representative Eric Martinez is also on his first term.

== Election results ==
The winners of the congressional, mayor and vice mayor seats of Valenzuela City is determined with the highest number of votes received. These positions are voted separately, so there is a possibility that the winning officials came from the same or different political parties.

=== Mayoral election ===
Incumbent mayor is Rexlon "Rex" T. Gatchalian.

Valenzuela City mayoral election
Party	Candidate	Votes	%
NPC	Rexlon "Rex" T. Gatchalian	248,911	96.7
Lakas	Antonio "Bong" M. Go	6,226	2.4
Independent	Bienvenido "Bien" A. Español	2,284	0.9
Invalid or blank votes			
Total votes			

=== Vice Mayoral election ===
Incumbent vice mayor is Lorena "Lorie" Natividad-Borja.

Valenzuela City mayoral election
Party	Candidate	Votes	%
NPC	Lorena C. Natividad-Borja	225,559	100.0
Invalid or blank votes			
Total votes			

=== Congressional elections ===
==== First district ====
Incumbent representative is Weslie Gatchalian.

2019 Philippine House of Representatives election in the 1st District of Valenzuela
Party	Candidate	Votes	%
NPC	Weslie "Wes" T. Gatchalian	119,372	100.0
Valid ballots		144,783	96.8
Invalid or blank votes		4,820	3.2
Total votes		149,603	100.0
NPC hold			

==== Second district ====
Incumbent representative is Eric Martinez.

2019 Philippine House of Representatives election in the 2nd District of Valenzuela
Party	Candidate	Votes	%
PDP–Laban	Eric M. Martinez	106,848	73.8
Lakas	Magtanggol "Magi" T. Gunigundo	37,935	26.2
Valid ballots		119,991	90.9
Invalid or blank votes		11,980	9.1
Total votes		131,971	100.0
PDP–Laban hold			

=== City council elections ===
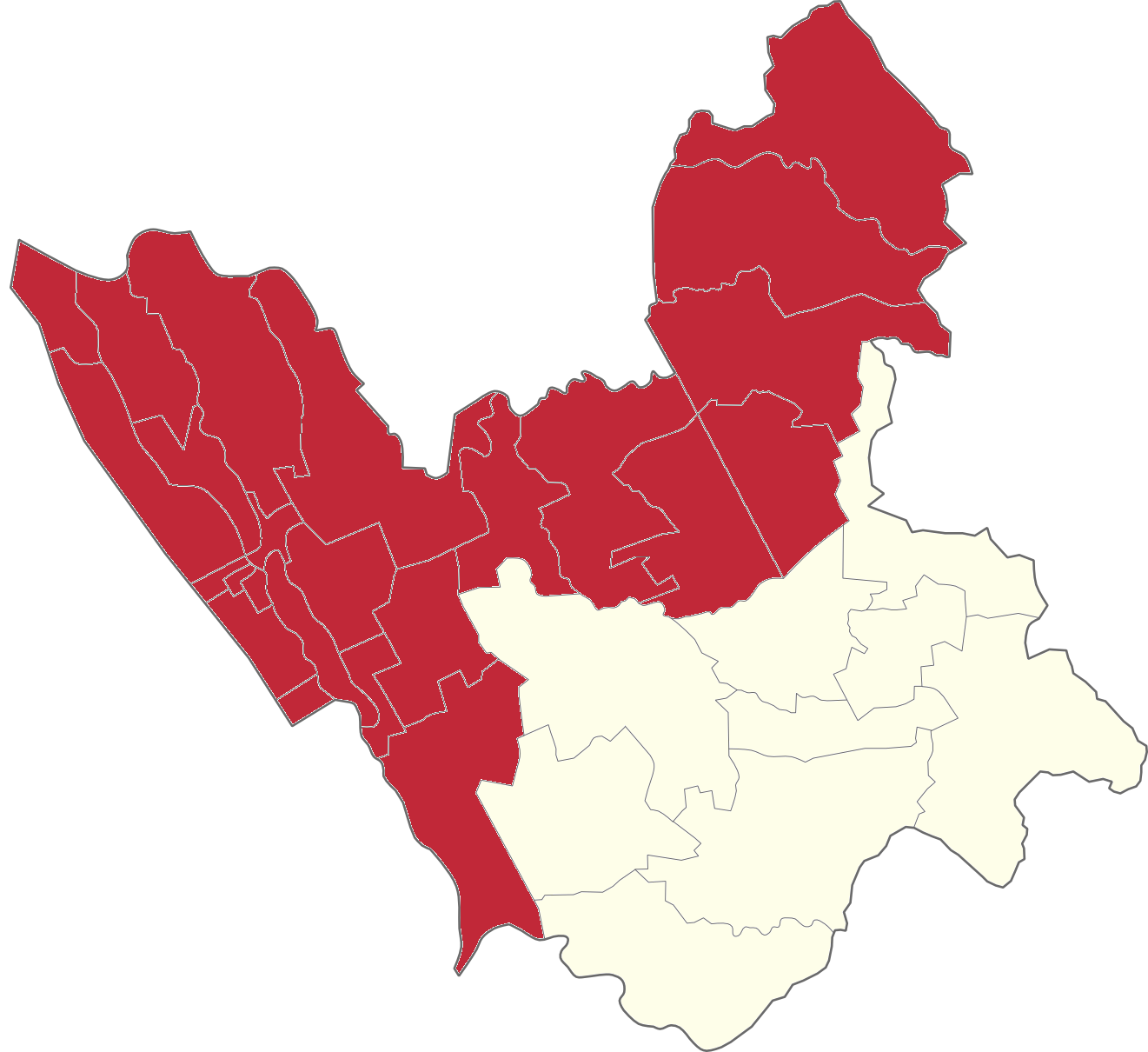
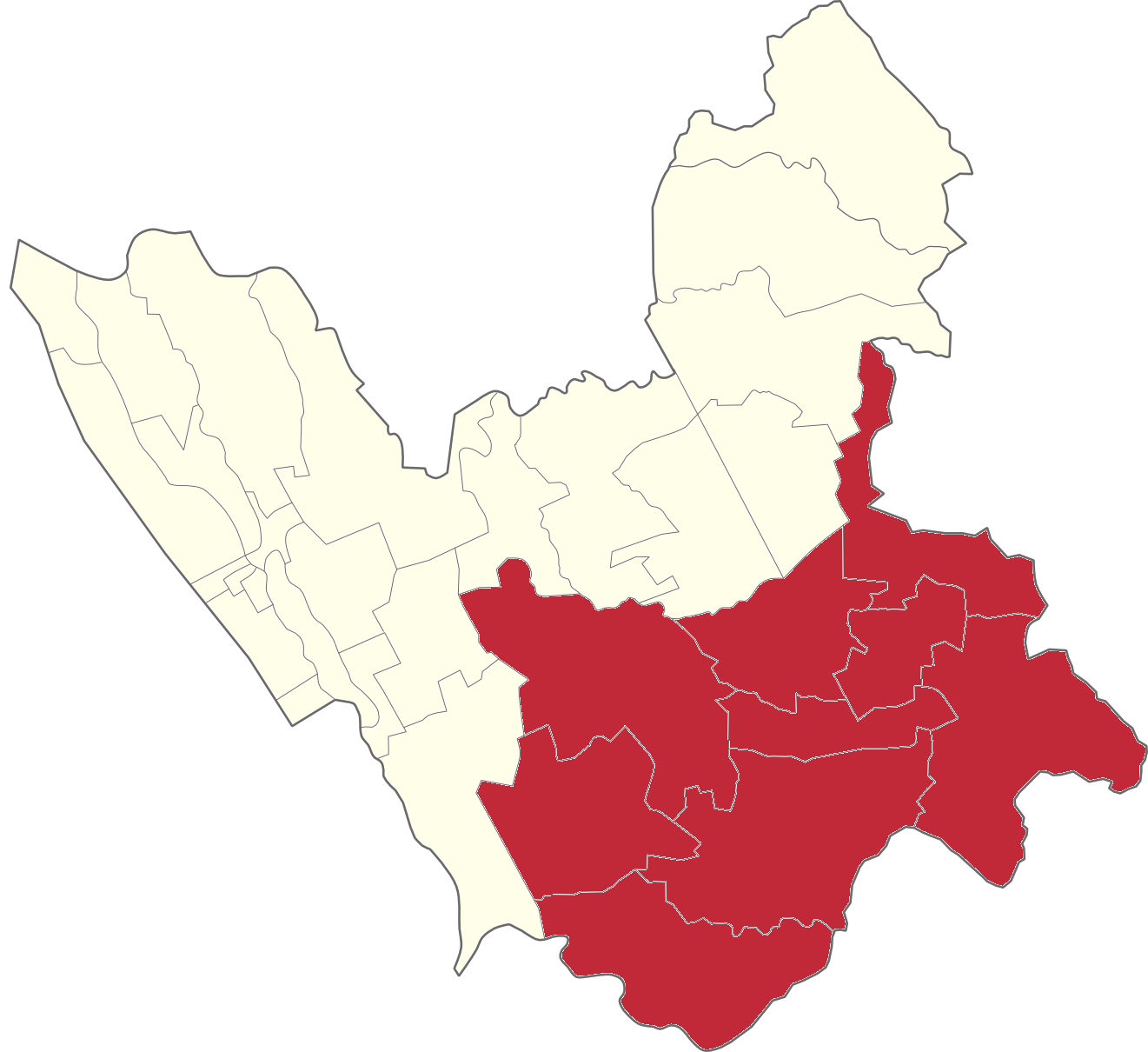
First (left) and second (right) legislative districts of Valenzuela.

The voters in the city are set to elect six councilors on the district where they are registered. Candidates are voted separately so there are chances where winning candidates will have unequal number of votes and may come from different political parties.

==== First district ====
2019 Valenzuela City First District council election
Party	Candidate	Votes	%
PDP–Laban	Rovin Andrew "Rovin" M. Feliciano	101,054	
NPC	Ricardo Ricarr "Ricar" C. Enriquez	93,643	
NPC	Ramon L. Encarnacion	92,505	
NPC	Jennifer "Jenny" P. Pingree	83,302	
NPC	Joseph William D. Lee	78,905	
NPC	Walter "Bimbo" D. Dela Cruz	77,950	

==== Second district ====
2019 Valenzuela City Second District council election
Party	Candidate	Votes	%
NPC	Crissha "Charee" M. Pineda	118,702	
NPC	Kimberly Ann "Kim" D. Galang	115,663	
NPC	Kristian Rome "Tyson" T. Sy	108,874	
NPC	Niña Shiela "Niña" B. Lopez	106,519	
NPC	Louie P. Nolasco	104,885	
NPC	Chiqui Marie "Chiqui" N. Carreon	100,079	
