= 2016 Valenzuela local elections =

Philippine election

- May 9, 2016

Mayoral, vice mayoral, congressional representatives and all 12 city council seats
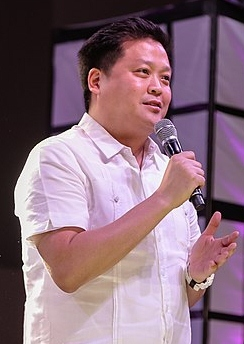

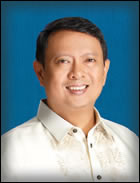
| Nominee | Rexlon Gatchalian | Magtanggol Gunigundo |
| Party | NPC | Liberal |
| Running mate | Lorie Natividad-Borja | Mar Morelos |
| Popular vote | 190,856 | 65,375 |
| Percentage | 71.28 | 24.42 |
Mayor before election
Rexlon Gatchalian
NPC
Elected mayor
Rexlon Gatchalian
NPC

Local elections was held in Valenzuela on May 9, 2016, within the Philippine general election. The voters elected for the elective local posts in the city: the mayor, vice mayor, the two Congressmen (or district representatives), and the councilors, six in each of the city's two legislative districts.

Incumbent mayor Rexlon Gatchalian of Nationalist People's Coalition won for his second term. Gatchalian's primary opponent is Magtanggol Gunigundo of the Liberal Party, who was on his third term and term limited as representative to the city's second congressional district since 2007.

== Mayoral and vice mayoral election ==
Incumbent mayor Rexlon "Rex" Gatchalian is on his first term as the mayor of Valenzuela. Prior to his election as mayor in 2013, he represented the first district of Valenzuela from 2007 to 2013. The other candidate for the mayoralty race is the incumbent second district representative Magtanggol "Magi" Gunigundo. Gunigundo represented the former lone district of Valenzuela from 1998 to 2001 and the second district of the same city since 2007, which is now on his third term. As prescribed by the 1987 Constitution of the Philippines, he is barred from running as the representative and he may choose to run into higher or lower office instead.

There are only two candidates for vice mayor's office: both are members of the city council: first district councilor Marcelino "Mar" Morelos and second district councilor Lorena "Lorie" Natividad-Borja.

== Congressional election ==
The incumbent first district representative Sherwin Gatchalian is running for a Senate position under Grace Poe's coalition, Partido Galing at Puso. The youngest of the Gatchalian brothers, Weslie, who is the incumbent representative of Alay Buhay party-list for the House of Representatives, is running for first district. The other candidate is Ritche Cuadra, who is a former member of the city council and unsuccessfully vied for the same post in 2013. The third candidate is Victor Reponia.

For the second district, incumbent representative Magtanggol Gunigundo is running for mayorship and is barred for running for the same position. His wife, Adelma, is running for the position instead. Adelma previously vied for the position of mayor last 2013 election. The other candidate for second district representative is Eric Martinez, who is a former member of the city council and the incumbent vice mayor since 2007.

== Election results ==
The winners of the congressional, mayor and vice mayor seats of Valenzuela City is determined with the highest number of votes received. These positions are voted separately, so there is a possibility that the winning officials came from the same or different political parties.

=== Mayoral election ===
Incumbent Rexlon "Rex" T. Gatchalian ran for reelection.

Valenzuela City mayoral election
| Party | Candidate | Votes | % |
|---|---|---|---|
| NPC | Rexlon T. Gatchalian | 190,856 | 71.28 |
| Liberal | Magtanggol T. Gunigundo | 65,375 | 24.42 |
| Invalid or blank votes | | 11,524 | 4.30 |
| Total votes | | 267,755 | 100.00 |
| NPC hold | | | |

=== Vice Mayoral election ===
Incumbent Eric Martinez did not run for reelection.

Valenzuela City Vice mayoral election
| Party | Candidate | Votes | % |
|---|---|---|---|
| NPC | Lorie Natividad-Borja | 162,131 | 60.55 |
| Liberal | Mar Morelos | 79,885 | 29.84 |
| Invalid or blank votes | | 25,739 | 9.61 |
| Total votes | | 267,755 | 100.00 |
| NPC hold | | | |

=== Congressional elections ===
==== First district ====
Incumbent Sherwin "Win" Gatchalian ran for the Senate and won. His brother, Weslie ran against former Councilor Ritche Cuadra.

2016 Valenzuela congressional First District election
| Party | Candidate | Votes | % |
|---|---|---|---|
| NPC | Weslie T. Gatchalian | 92,541 | 74.26 |
| Liberal | Ritche D. Cuadra | 22,246 | 17.85 |
| PBM | Victor Reponia | 336 | 0.27 |
| Invalid or blank votes | | 9,491 | 7.62 |
| Total votes | | 124,614 | 100.00 |
| NPC hold | | | |

==== Second district ====
Incumbent Magtanggol Gunigundo is term-limited and running for Mayor. His wife Adelma is running against Vice Mayor Eric Martinez.

2016 Valenzuela congressional Second District election
| Party | Candidate | Votes | % |
|---|---|---|---|
| PDP–Laban | Eric M. Martinez | 86,069 | 60.13 |
| Liberal | Adelma Yang-Gunigundo | 44,045 | 30.77 |
| Invalid or blank votes | | 13,027 | 9.10 |
| Total votes | | 143,141 | 100.00 |
| PDP–Laban gain from Lakas | | | |

=== City council elections ===
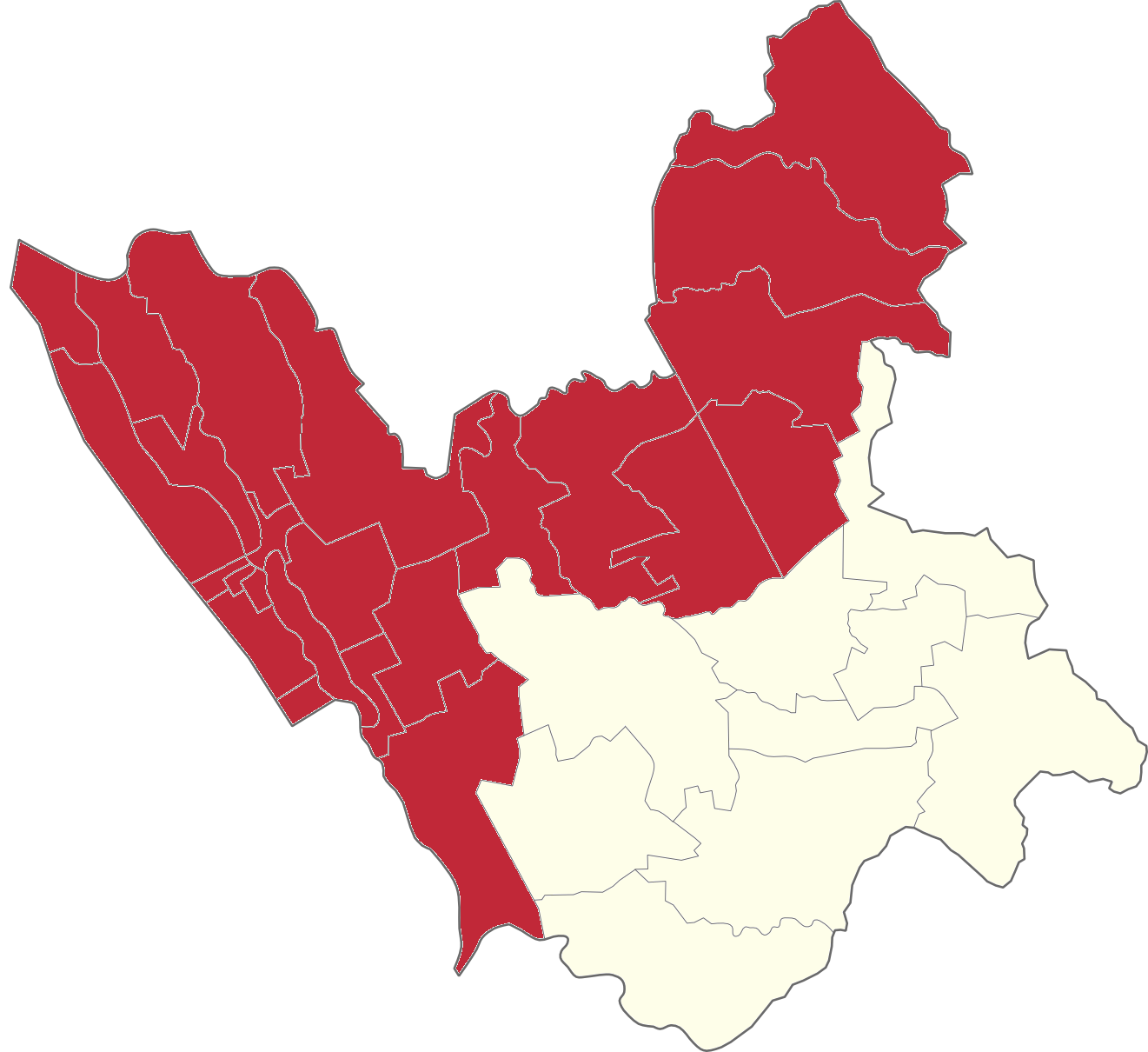
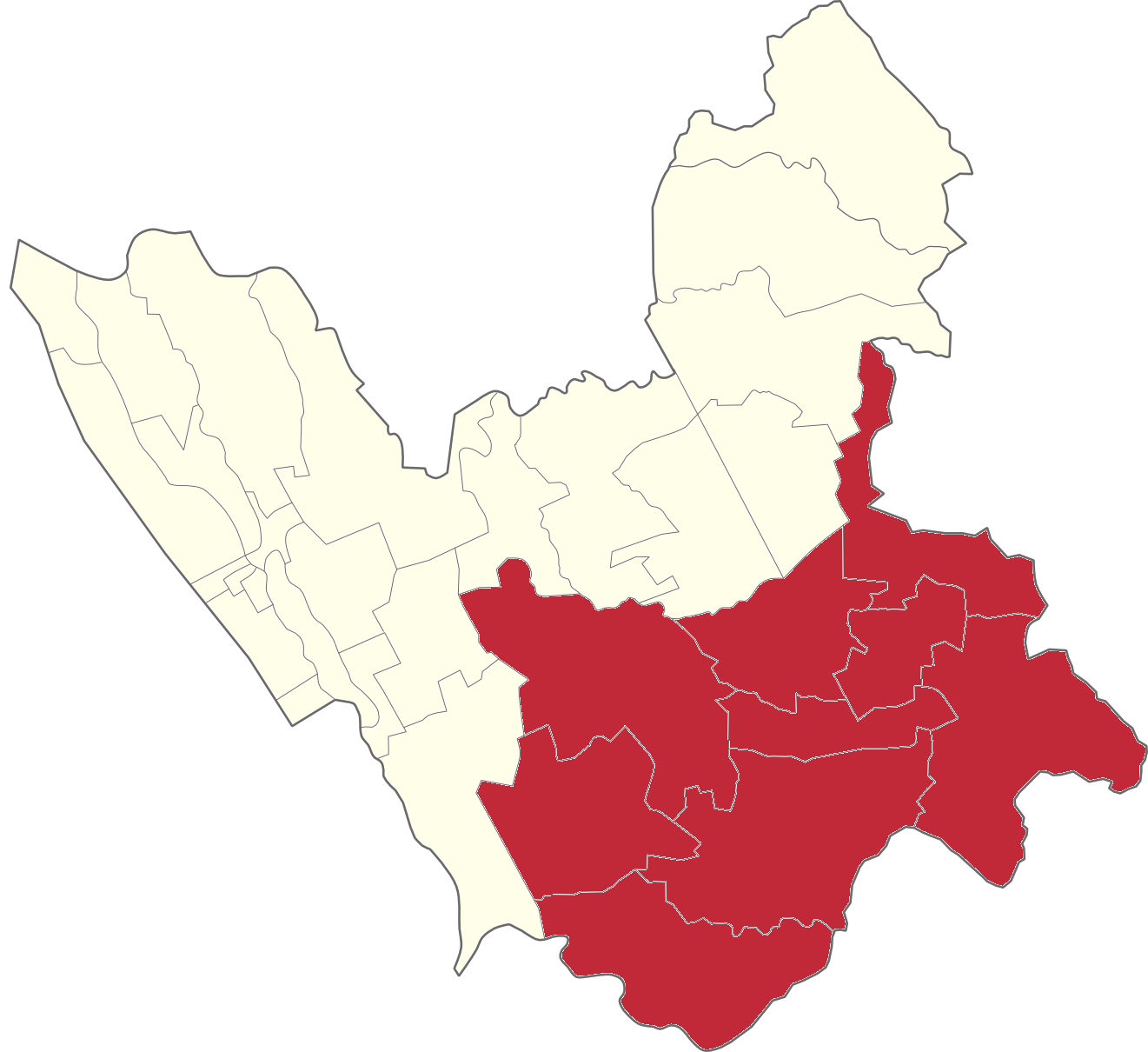
First (left) and second(right) legislative districts of Valenzuela.

The voters in the city are set to elect six councilors on the district where they are living, hence registered. Candidates are voted separately so there are chances where winning candidates will have unequal number of votes and may come from different political parties.

==== Summary ====
Summary of City Council Election
| Party | Mayoral/vice mayoral candidate [Number of candidates] | Total votes | | Total seats | | |
| Party | Mayoral/vice mayoral candidate [Number of candidates] | Total | % | Seats before (2013) | Seats after (2016) | % |
|---|---|---|---|---|---|---|
| Liberal | Magtanggol Gunigundo (M) [11] | | | 2 | 2 | 16.67% |
| NPC | Rexlon Gatchalian (M) [10] | | | 8 | 8 | 66.67% |
| PDP–Laban | None [1] | | | 1 | 1 | 8.33% |
| UNA | None [1] | | | 1 | 1 | 8.33% |
| Independents | Varies [3] | | | 0 | 0 | 0.00% |
| Total valid votes cast | | | N/A | | | |
| Total turnout | | | | | | |
| Total partisan seats | | | | 12 | 12 | |
| Seat for Association of Barangay Captains President | | | | 1 | 1 | |
| Seat for Association of Sangguniang Kabataan chairmen President | | | | 1 | 1 | |
| Total non-partisan seats | | | | 2 | 2 | |
| Total seats | | | | 14 | 14 | 100.0% |

==== First district ====
2016 Valenzuela City First District council election
| Party | Candidate | Votes | % |
|---|---|---|---|
| NPC | Antonio R. Espiritu^{TNV} | 77,752 | 12.88 |
| PDP–Laban | Rovin Andrew M. Feliciano^{TNV} | 76,370 | 12.65 |
| NPC | Jennifer P. Pingree-Esplana^{TNV} | 75,420 | 12.49 |
| NPC | Marlon Paulo D. Alejandrino^{TNV} | 73,537 | 12.18 |
| NPC | Ricardo Ricarr C. Enriquez^{TNV} | 68,526 | 11.35 |
| NPC | Ramon L. Encarnacion^{TNV} | 67,827 | 11.23 |
| Liberal | Katherine C. Pineda^{GM} | 52,879 | 8.76 |
| Independent | Rey Junio | 26,454 | 4.38 |
| Liberal | Rene Trinidad^{GM} | 26,162 | 4.33 |
| Liberal | Jojo San Diego^{GM} | 18,110 | 3.00 |
| Liberal | Alvin Bañez^{GM} | 14,603 | 2.41 |
| Liberal | Obet Bartolome^{GM} | 11,882 | 1.96 |
| Liberal | Waldo Estrella^{GM} | 10,908 | 1.80 |
| Independent | Felix Caracas | 3,023 | 0.50 |
| Total votes | | 124,614 | 100.00 |

==== Second district ====
2016 Valenzuela City Second District council election
| Party | Candidate | Votes | % |
|---|---|---|---|
| NPC | Kimberly Ann D. Galang^{TNV} | 94,520 | 12.86 |
| NPC | Crissha Charee M. Pineda^{TNV} | 93,266 | 12.69 |
| NPC | Lailanie P. Nolasco^{TNV} | 90,913 | 12.37 |
| Liberal | Rosalie D. Esteban^{GM} | 73,475 | 9.99 |
| UNA | Kristian Rome T. Sy^{TNV} | 68,288 | 9.29 |
| Liberal | Maria Cecilia V. Mayo^{GM} | 63,504 | 8.64 |
| NPC | Niña Lopez^{TNV} | 61,903 | 8.42 |
| NPC | Sel Sabino^{TNV} | 51,752 | 7.04 |
| Liberal | Rizalino "Bong" Ferrer^{GM} | 45,162 | 6.14 |
| Independent | Philip Sabino^{GM} | 33,602 | 4.57 |
| Liberal | Danilo "Bungyaw" Canda^{GM} | 26,735 | 3.63 |
| Liberal | Jefferson Davis L. Uy^{GM} | 25,874 | 3.52 |
| Independent | Pablo L. Hernandez III | 5,774 | 0.78 |
| Total votes | | 143,141 | 100.00 |
