= 2013 Valenzuela local elections =

Philippine election

- May 13, 2013

Mayoral, vice mayoral, congressional representatives and all 12 city council seats
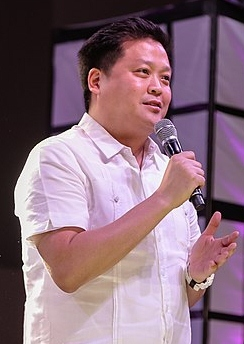
Nominee	Rexlon Gatchalian	Adelma Gunigundo
Party	NPC	Lakas
Running mate	Eric Martinez	Katherine Pineda
Popular vote	144,282	58,836
Percentage	67.71	27.61
Mayor before election
Sherwin Gatchalian
NPC
Elected mayor
Rexlon Gatchalian
NPC

Local elections were held in Valenzuela on 13 May 2013, within the Philippine general election. The voters elected local posts in the city: the mayor, vice mayor, the two Congressmen (or district representatives), and the councilors, six in each of the city's two legislative districts.

Representative Rexlon Gatchalian, a brother to the current mayor Sherwin, is running for the city mayor's office for the first time. Gatchalian's primary opponent is Adelma Gunigundo, wife of the incumbent second district representative Magtanggol Gunigundo.

Gatchalian's running mate is vice mayor Eric Martinez, who has served since 2007; if he wins, he will have his term limited in 2016. First district councilor Katherine Pineda-Hernandez is Gunigundo's running mate.

The election was won by Gatchalian and Martinez for the local posts.

== Mayoral and vice mayoral election ==
Incumbent mayor Sherwin Gatchalian is now on his third term as the mayor of Valenzuela. As prescribed by the 1987 Constitution of the Philippines, he is barred from running as the mayor and he may choose to run into higher or lower office instead. Prior to his election as mayor in 2004, he represented the first district of Valenzuela from 2001 to 2004. In April 2012, he signed his intention to run for the Senate race under the Pwersa ng Masang Pilipino party headed by former President Joseph Estrada.

He instead would run as representative of the 1st District of the city. His brother, incumbent congressman Rexlon Gatchalian who is on his second term is running in his place. Rexlon Gatchalian, also known as Rex, is on his second term as district representative/congressman, hence he is not yet term limited. Rex entered Valenzuela politics in 2007 occupying his current post. The other candidate for mayorship is Adelma A. Yang-Gunigundo, wife to the incumbent second district representative Magtanggol Gunigundo.

There are only two candidates for vice mayor's office: incumbent vice mayor and Liberal's Eric M. Martinez and incumbent first district councilor Katherine "Khay" C. Pineda.

== Congressional elections ==
There are two and three candidates for the congressman or district representative post of the districts 1 and 2 of Valenzuela, respectively. The city is divided into two congressional districts: the first district encompasses 23 barangays in the northern portion of the city and the second district which contains 9 barangays.

The incumbent first district representative Rexlon "Rex" Gatchalian running under the Nationalist People's Coalition, the same political party he had during the 2007 election. Gatchalian, a businessman, is the younger brother of the incumbent mayor Sherwin Gatchalian. The other candidate for congressman is Ritche Cuadra, a member of Valenzuela City Council since 2001.

For the second district, the incumbent representative Magtanggol "Magi" Gunigundo will run under the Lakas-Kampi-CMD party. A lawyer by profession, he became the representative of the former municipality of Valenzuela from 1998 to 2001. If he will be elected to office in 2013, this will be his third term, thus he is not eligible to re-election in 2016 for the same position. The second candidate is Shalani Carla "Lani" Soledad-Romulo, a member of the Valenzuela city council and wife to Pasig Representative Roman Romulo. Soledad-Romulo gained prominence as a former girlfriend to President Benigno Aquino III from 2008 to 2010 and as a TV host at television network TV5 since 2010. The other candidate for congressman is Pablo "Pabs" Hernandez III, a columnist from the tabloid Bulgar who ran for the mayoralty race in 2010.

Unlike in 2010 polls, few of the people who run for the city council are up for reelection. For the first district, this list includes Idol Alejandrino, Cora Cortez and Tony Espiritu; Adrian Dapat, Cecil Mayo, Lorie Natividad-Borja, and Lai Nolasco for the second district. Two of candidates from each district are also former members of the council: Mar Morelos and Lotlot Esteban. Rovin Feliciano and Ricarr Enriquez are barangay captains of Arkong Bato and Pasolo, respectively. Genny Esplana who targets the first district council, is the titleholder for the 1990 Bb. Pilipinas-International; Charee Pineda, who vies second district councils, is a member of ABS-CBN's Star Magic circle and held the lead role in 2011 daytime drama series Angelito: Batang Ama.

== Mock polls ==
Mock polls are done in different parts of the city to survey possible winners to the 2013 midterm elections. Based on a February 2013 mock polls done by the Valenzuela City District Two Voters Group, an independent non-government group, conducted by former dean Rolando Lansigan, the following candidates garnered the spot for the second district:

Mayoral race (February 2013, 2nd District)
Person	Percentage
Bonifacio, Danilo (Independent)	2.94%
Gatchalian, Rexlon T. (NPC)	70.58%
Gunigundo, Adelma Y. (Lakas)	26.47%

Vice Mayoral race (February 2013, 2nd District)
Person	Percentage
Martinez, Eric M. (Liberal)	33.33%
Pineda, Katherine C. (Lakas)	63.63%

Congressional race (February 2013, 2nd District)
Person	Percentage
Gunigundo, Magtanggol T. (Lakas)	54.28%
Hernandez, Pablo L. III (Independent)	38.57%
Soledad-Romulo, Shalani S. (Liberal)	7.14%

== Election results ==
The winners of the congressional, mayor and vice mayor seats of Valenzuela City is determined with the highest number of votes received. These positions are voted separately, so there is a possibility that the winning officials came from the same or different political parties.

=== Mayoral election ===
Incumbent Sherwin T. Gatchalian is running for representative of the city's first district.

Valenzuela City mayoral election
Party	Candidate	Votes	%
NPC	Rexlon Gatchalian	144,282	67.71
Lakas	Adelma Yang-Gunigundo	58,836	27.61
Independent	Danilo Bonifacio	676	0.32
Invalid or blank votes		9,289	4.36
Total votes		213,083	100.00
NPC hold			

=== Vice mayoral election ===
Incumbent Eric M. Martinez is running for reelection.

Valenzuela City vice mayoral election
Party	Candidate	Votes	%
Liberal	Eric Martinez	112,696	52.89
Lakas	Katherine Pineda-Hernandez	82,415	43.68
Invalid or blank votes		17,972	8.43
Total votes		213,083	100.00
Liberal hold			

=== Congressional elections ===
==== First district ====
Incumbent Rexlon Gatchalian is running for the mayorship; his brother, Mayor Sherwin Gatchalian, is his party's nominee.

2013 Philippine House of Representatives election at Valenzuela's 1st district
Party	Candidate	Votes	%
NPC	Sherwin Gatchalian	67,992	70.05
Lakas	Ritche Cuadra	23,805	24.53
Invalid or blank votes		5,265	5.42
Total votes		97,062	100.00
NPC hold			

==== Second district ====
Magtanggol Gunigundo is the incumbent. He will be facing off against councilor Shalani Soledad-Romulo, if Soledad-Romulo elected she will join her husband Roman in the House separately.

2013 Philippine House of Representatives election at Valenzuela's 2nd district
Party	Candidate	Votes	%
Lakas	Magtanggol Gunigundo	56,542	48.73
Liberal	Shalani Soledad	53,800	46.37
Independent	Pablo Hernandez III	650	0.56
Invalid or blank votes		5,029	4.33
Total votes		116,021	100.00
Lakas hold			

=== City council elections ===
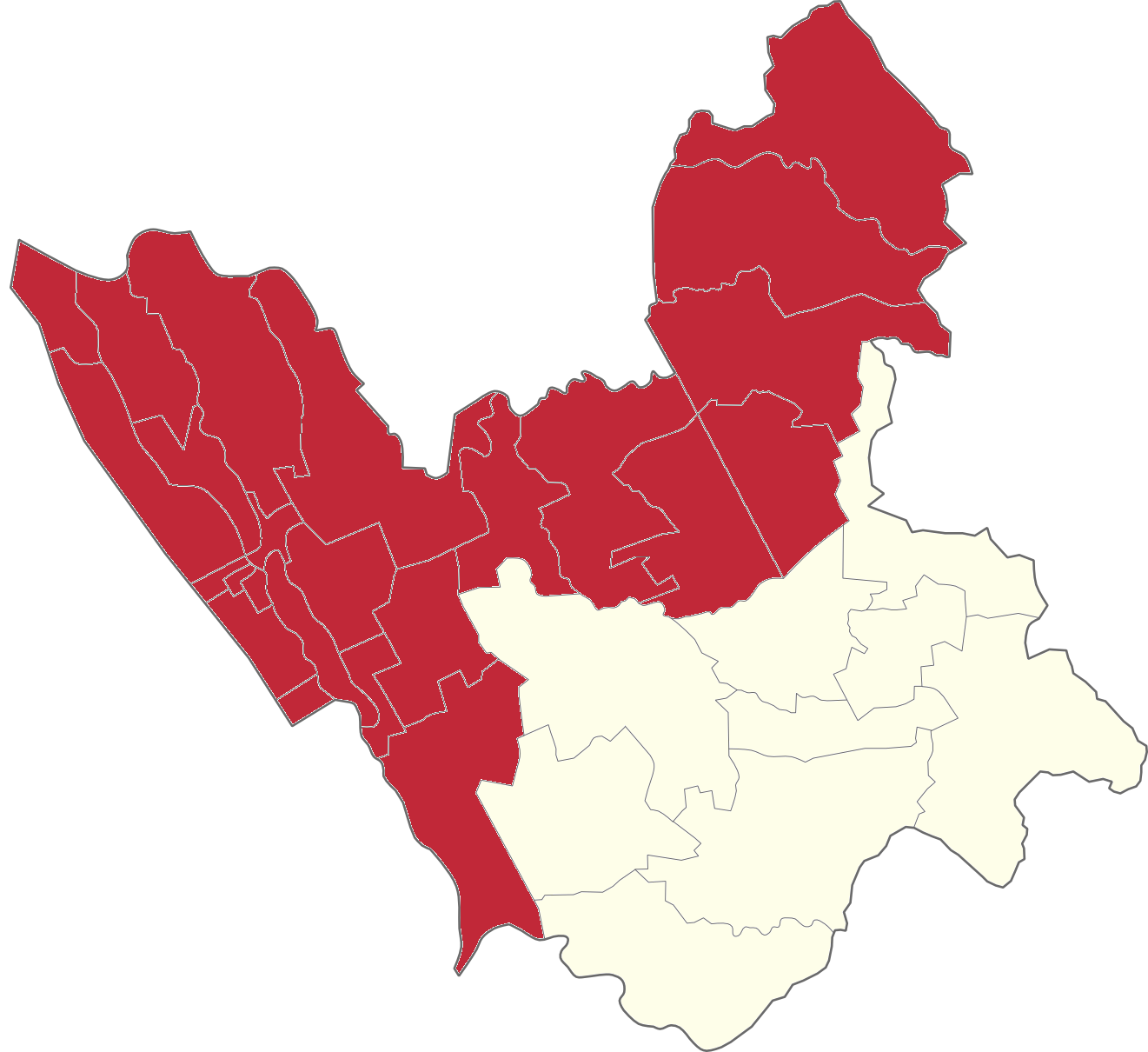
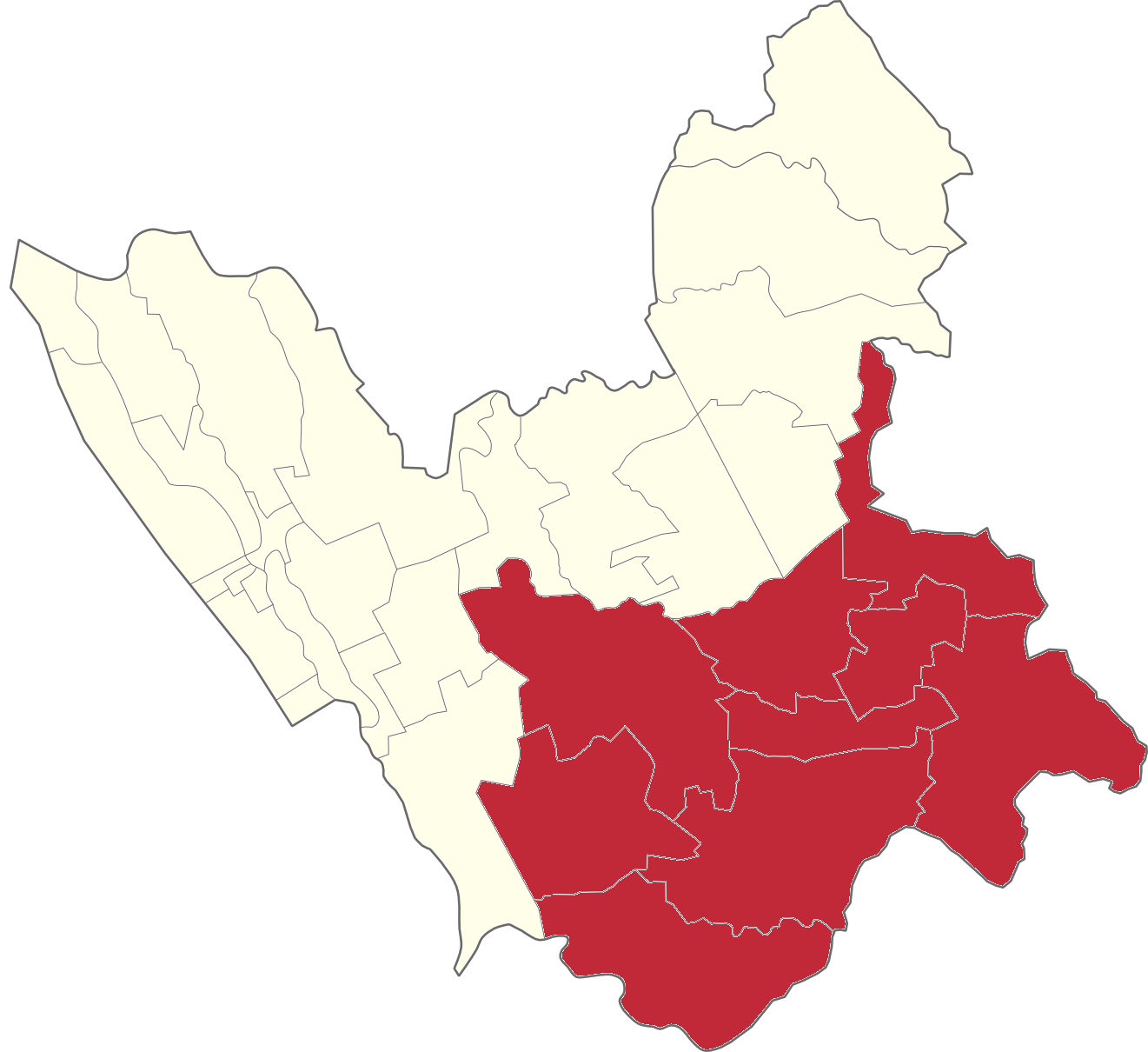
First (left) and second(right) legislative districts of Valenzuela.

The voters in the city are set to elect six councillors on the district where they are living, hence registered. Candidates are voted separately so there are chances where winning candidates will have unequal number of votes and may come from different political parties.

==== Summary ====
Summary of City Council Election
Party	Mayoral/vice mayoral candidate [Number of candidates]	Total votes		Total seats		
Party	Mayoral/vice mayoral candidate [Number of candidates]	Total	%	Seats before	Seats after	%
Lakas–Kampi	Ritche Cuadra (M) [11]			2	2	16.67%
Liberal	Eric Martinez (VM) [3]			2	1	8.33%
Nacionalista	None [0]			3	0	0.00%
NPC	Rexlon Gatchalian (M) [10]			5	8	66.67%
UNA	None [1]			0	1	8.33%
Independents	Varies [1]			0	0	0.00%
Total valid votes cast			N/A			
Total turnout						
Total partisan seats				12	12	
Seat for Association of Barangay Captains President				1	1	
Seat for Association of Sangguniang Kabataan chairmen President				1	1	
Total non-partisan seats				2	2	
Total seats				14	14	100.0%

==== First district council ====
2013 Valenzuela congressional first district election
Party	Candidate	Votes	%
NPC	Antonio "Tony" R. Espiritu^{V}	60,264	12.30
Lakas	Marcelino "Mar" G. Morelos^{M}	57,890	11.82
Liberal	Rovin Andrew "Rovin" M. Feliciano^{V}	55,175	11.27
NPC	Corazon "Cora" A. Cortez^{V}	52,816	10.78
NPC	Marlon Paulo "Idol" D. Alejandrino^{V}	50,909	10.39
NPC	Jennifer "Genny" P. Pingree-Esplana^{V}	49,242	10.05
NPC	Ricardo Ricarr "Ricar" C. Enriquez^{V}	43,108	8.80
Lakas	Reynaldo "Rey" D. Cuadra^{M}	35,059	7.16
Lakas	Czarina Chlariza "Ina" M. Esplana^{M}	25,470	5.20
Lakas	Ernesto "Ernie" M. Tolentino^{M}	23,207	4.74
Lakas	Carolino "Carol" S. Pineda^{M}	19,765	4.04
Lakas	Ma. Cristina "Cristy" P. Mendoza^{M}	15,265	3.12
Independent	Jose "Danilo" I. Jurado III	1,604	0.33
Total votes		98,888	100.00

==== Second district council ====
2013 Valenzuela congressional second district election
Party	Candidate	Votes	%
NPC	Lorena "Lorie" C. Natividad-Borja^{T}	66,781	11.21
NPC	Lailanie "Lai" P. Nolasco^{T}	63,680	10.69
NPC	Kimberly Ann "Kim" D. Galang^{T}	61,627	10.35
NPC	Crissha Charee "Charee" M. Pineda^{T}	58,399	9.80
Lakas	Rosalie "Lotlot" D. Esteban^{M}	56,044	9.41
UNA	Kristian Rome "Tyson" T. Sy^{M}	53,253	8.94
Lakas	Maria Cecilia "Cecil" V. Mayo^{M}	49,791	8.36
NPC	Adrian "Adrian" C. Dapat^{T}	46,948	7.88
Liberal	Martell Francisco "Martell" R. Soledad^{T}	42,928	7.21
Lakas	Manny "Manny" Hung So^{M}	39,501	6.63
Liberal	Carlitos "Sonny" B. Tiquia	28,797	4.83
Lakas	Arturo "Art" F. Morales^{M}	14,034	2.36
Lakas	Jefferson Davis "Jefferson Davis" L. Uy^{M}	13,900	2.33
Total votes		116,021	100.00
