= 2007 Valenzuela local elections =

3rd City elections in Valenzuela, Metro Manila

- May 14, 2007

Mayoral, vice mayoral, congressional representatives and all 12 city council seats
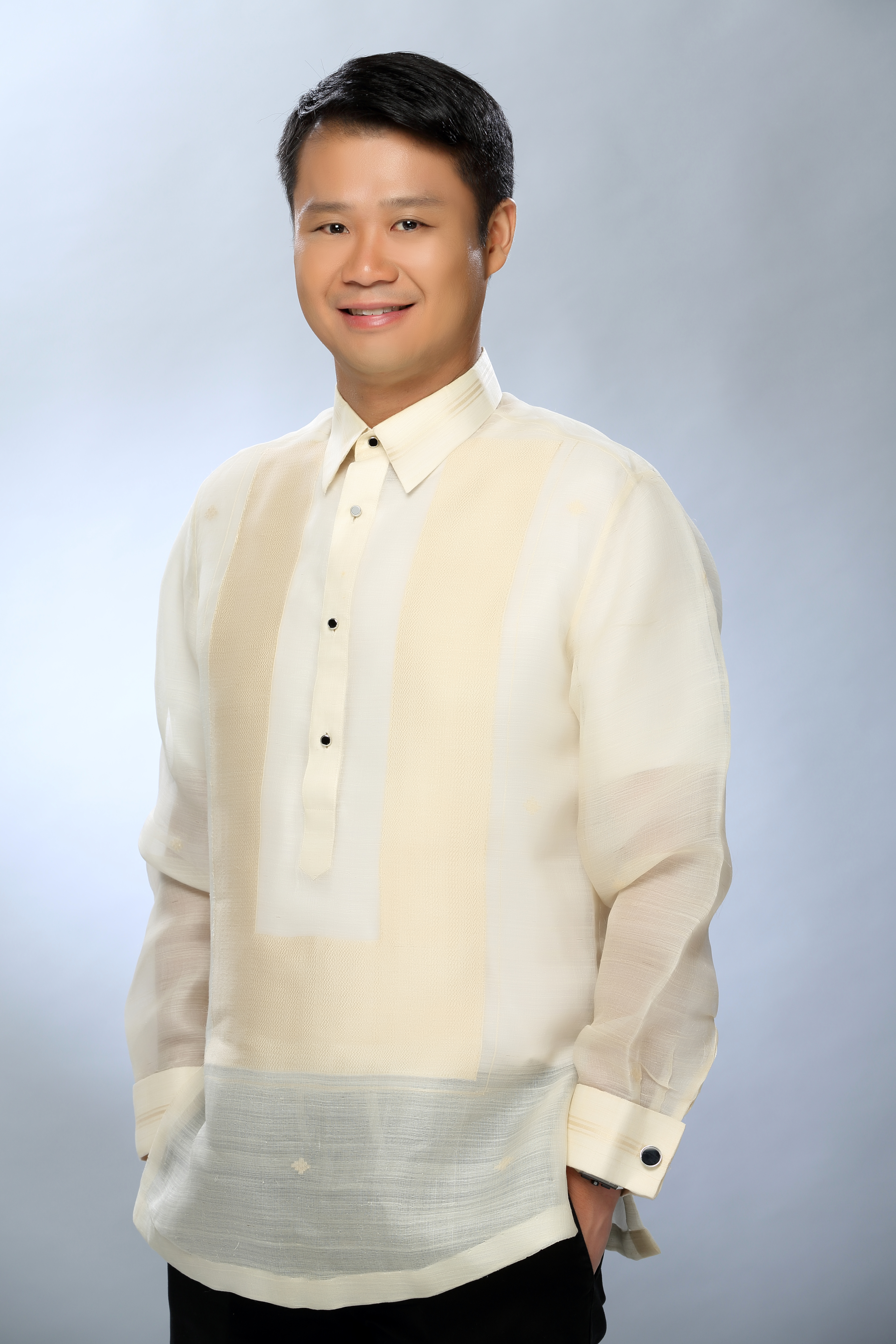

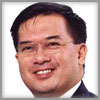
Nominee	Sherwin Gatchalian	Bobbit Carlos
Party	NPC	Lakas
Running mate	Antonio Espiritu	Eric Martinez
Popular vote	82,576	76,650
Percentage	51.82	48.10
Mayor before election
Sherwin Gatchalian
NPC
Elected mayor
Sherwin Gatchalian
NPC

Local elections were held in the city of Valenzuela on May 14, 2007, within the Philippine general election. The voters voted for the elective local posts in the city: the mayor, vice mayor, two Congressmen, and the councilors—six in each of the city's two legislative districts.

== Election results ==
The winners of the congressional, mayoral and vice mayoral seats of Valenzuela City are determined with the highest number of votes received. These positions are voted for separately, so there is a possibility that the winning officials come from different political parties.

=== Mayoral election ===
Incumbent Sherwin Gatchalian ran for re-election. His primary opponent was former mayor Bobbit Carlos.

Valenzuela City mayoral election
Party	Candidate	Votes	%
NPC	Sherwin Gatchalian	82,576	51.82
Lakas	Jose Emmanuel Carlos	76,650	48.10
Independent	Salvador Gilva	81	0.50
Independent	Nestor Palando	54	0.03
Total votes		159,361	100.00
NPC hold			

=== Vice mayoral election ===
Incumbent Antonio Espiritu ran for reelection. His main opponent was incumbent 2nd district councilor Eric Martinez.

Valenzuela City vice mayoral election
Party	Candidate	Votes	%
Lakas	Eric Martinez	82,089	51.51
NPC	Antonio Espiritu	77,283	48.49
Total votes		159,372	100.00
Lakas hold			

=== Congressional elections ===
==== First district ====
Incumbent representative Bobbit Carlos ran for mayor. His seat will be contested by incumbent mayor Sherwin's brother, Rexlon, Danilo Espiritu and barangay councilor Eddie Lozada.

2007 Philippine House of Representatives election at Valenzuela's First district
Party	Candidate	Votes	%
NPC	Rex Gatchalian	36,251	52.11
Lakas	Eddie Lozada	29,949	43.05
Independent	Danilo Espiritu	3,366	4.84
Total votes		69,566	100.00
NPC hold			

==== Second district ====
Incumbent representative Antonio Serapio died in a car crash on February 19, 2007. His seat will be contested by former representative Magi Gunigundo, Carlitos Tiquia and Wes Gatchalian, brother of incumbent mayor Win and Rex.

2007 Philippine House of Representatives election at Valenzuela's Second district
Party	Candidate	Votes	%
Liberal	Magi Gunigundo	47,536	56.11
NPC	Wes Gatchalian	22,148	26.14
KAMPI	Carlitos Tiquia	15,042	17.75
Total votes		84,726	100.00
Liberal gain from Nacionalista			

=== City council elections ===
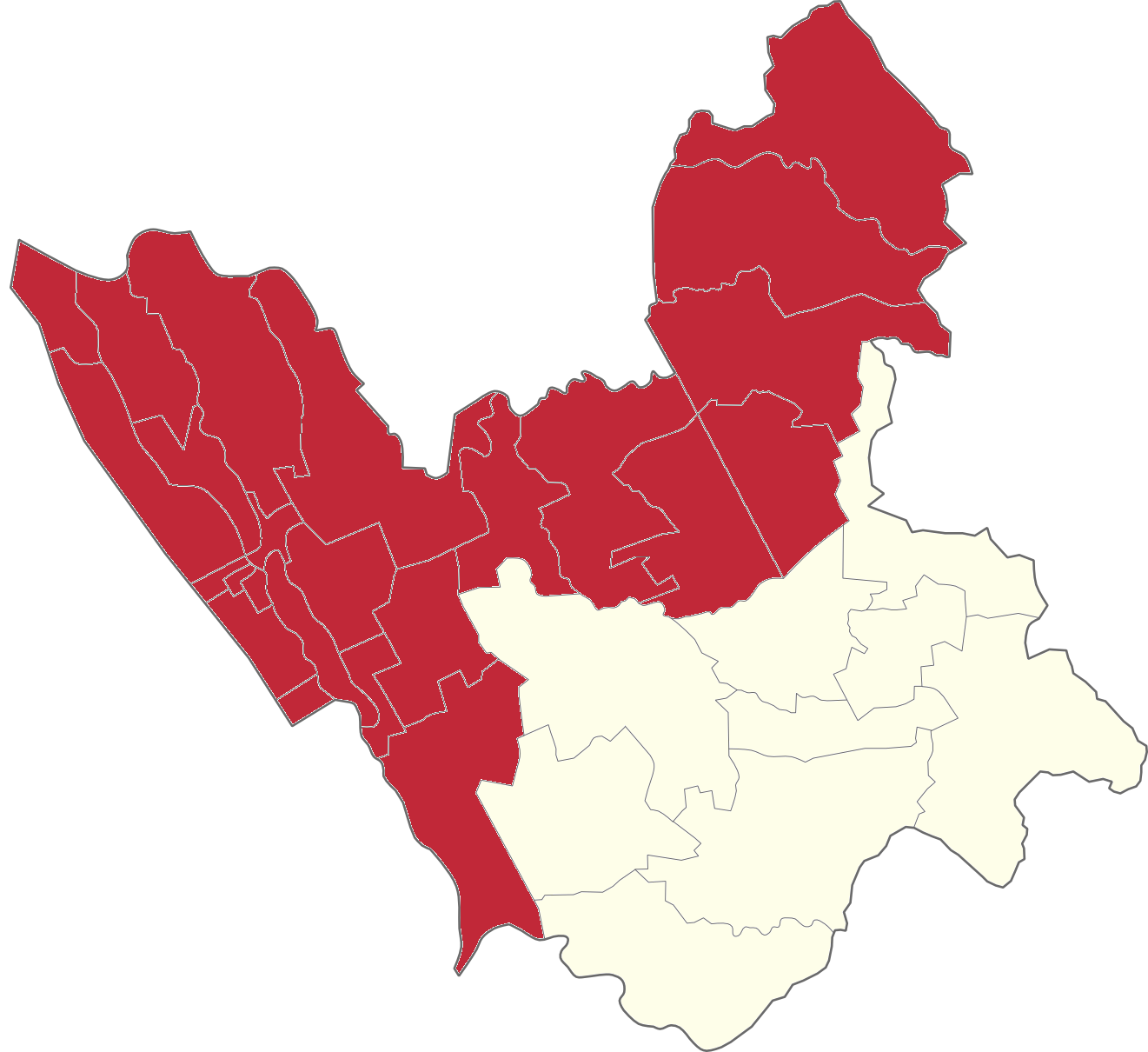
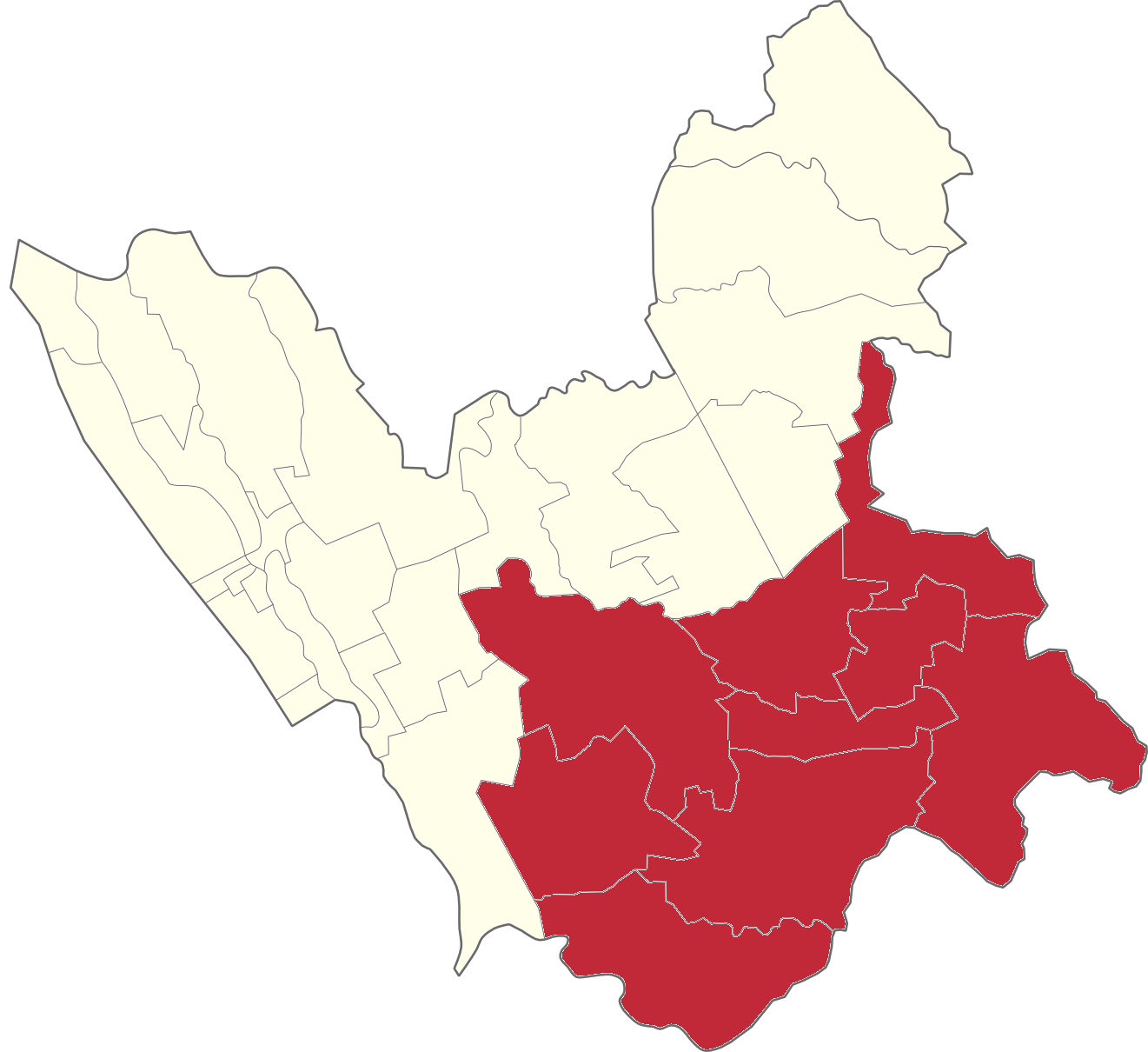
First (left) and second (right) legislative districts of Valenzuela.

The voters in the city are set to elect six councilors on the district where they are living, hence registered. Candidates are voted separately so there are chances where winning candidates will have unequal number of votes and may come from different political parties.

==== First district ====
2007 Valenzuela City Council election - First District
Party	Candidate	Votes	%
Liberal	Marcelino Morelos	52,554	
Lakas	Ritche Cuadra	45,721	
Liberal	Katherine Pineda	43,956	
Lakas	Gerald Esplana	42,273	
NPC	Ignacio Santiago Jr.	33,299	
NPC	Corazon Cortez	32,780	
NPC	Elizabeth Chongco	30,815	
NPC	Maria Teresa Garcia	30,355	
Lakas	Meilene Dizor	30,331	
NPC	Marlon Paulo Alejandrino	24,357	
Lakas	Angel Caluag	14,551	
NPC	Celso San Andres	14,053	
Independent	Norman Cayabyab	1,773	
Independent	Narcisa Tengco	1,613	
Independent	Sylvia Gonzaga	778	
Independent	Gerico San Juan	766	
Total votes			

==== Second district ====
2007 Valenzuela City Council election - Second District
Party	Candidate	Votes	%
Liberal	Shalani Carla Soledad	57,398	
NPC	Kate Abigael Galang-Coseteng	55,339	
Lakas	Rosalie Esteban	53,716	
Lakas	Maria Cecila Mayo	49,425	
NPC	Fernando Padrinao	41,752	
NPC	Adrian Dapat	33,725	
NPC	Lailanie Nolasco	33,245	
NPC	Rogelio De Guzman	32,770	
Liberal	Jose Marcelo	30,460	
NPC	Domingo Rivera	27,283	
Lakas	Martell Soledad	25,389	
Liberal	Jasmin Antonio-Jickain	23,908	
Independent	Priscilla Saldito	2,602	
Independent	Donato Salonga	959	
Total votes			
