= Ikaw sa Puso Ko =

2004 Philippine television drama series

- Also known as: In My Heart
- Genre: Romantic drama
- Directed by: Ruel S. Bayani
- Starring: Nadine Samonte; Oyo Boy Sotto; James Blanco
- Theme music composer: Trina Belamide
- Opening theme: "Doon" by Toni Gonzaga
- Country of origin: Philippines
- Original language: Tagalog
- No. of episodes: 153

Production
- Executive producers: Antonio P. Tuviera; Malou Choa-Fagar
- Producer: Antonio P. Tuviera
- Camera setup: Multiple-camera setup
- Running time: 30 minutes
- Production company: TAPE Inc.

Original release
- Network: GMA Network
- Release: March 1 – October 1, 2004

Ikaw sa Puso Ko (transl. you in my heart / international title: In My Heart) is a 2004 Philippine television drama romance series broadcast by GMA Network. Directed by Ruel S. Bayani, it stars Nadine Samonte, Oyo Boy Sotto and James Blanco. It premiered on March 1, 2004 on the network's afternoon line up. The series concluded on October 1, 2004, with a total of 153 episodes.

== Cast and characters ==
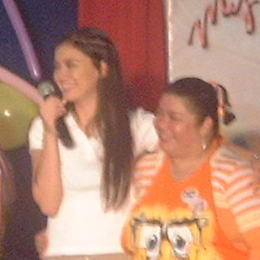
Nadine Samonte (left) portrays Sofia

Lead cast

- Nadine Samonte as Sofia
- Oyo Boy Sotto as Anton
- James Blanco as Alfie

Supporting cast

- Charee Pineda as Mirasol
- Rita Avila
- Lotlot de Leon
- Amy Perez as Susan
- Ricardo Cepeda
- Alicia Alonzo
- Suzette Ranillo
- Nina Medina
- Gayle Valencia
- John Medina
- John Apacible
- Ali Alejandro
- Bettina Carlos
- JJ Zamora
- Malou Crisologo
- Gay Balignasay
