= Kenneth Gatchalian =

Filipino businessman and politician

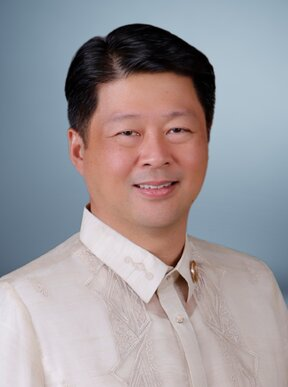
- Official portrait, 2026

Member of the House of Representatives from Valenzuela's 1st district
- Incumbent
- Assumed office June 30, 2025
- Preceded by: Rex Gatchalian

Personal details
- Born: Kenneth Ting Gatchalian; January 12, 1976 (age 50) Valenzuela, Philippines
- Party: NPC (2024–present)
- Spouse: Mary Jeanette Kuo
- Relations: Win Gatchalian (brother); Rex Gatchalian (brother); Wes Gatchalian (brother)
- Education: University of Texas at Austin
- Occupation: Businessman, Politician

Kenneth Ting Gatchalian (born January 12, 1976) is a Filipino businessman and politician, currently serving as the representative of Valenzuela's 1st congressional district since 2025.

== Early life and education ==
Gatchalian was born on January 12, 1976, to industrialist William Gatchalian and Dee Hua Ting, a religious leader and community figure in Valenzuela. He is the second of four siblings: Sherwin, Rexlon, and Weslie, all of whom have served in government or executive roles.

He earned a degree in Architecture from the University of Texas at Austin and is also a licensed real estate broker.

== Business career ==
Gatchalian has held numerous leadership roles in the private sector, particularly in companies under the Wellex Group, which was founded by his father. He has served as:

- President and CEO of Wellex Industries, Inc.
- President and CEO of Acesite (Philippines) Hotel Corporation
- President of Waterfront Philippines, Inc.
- President of Metro Alliance Holdings & Equities Corp.
- President of Orient Pacific Corporation

In November 2024, Orient Pacific Corporation was involved in public controversy after one of its SUVs, registered under Gatchalian’s leadership, was caught using a protocol "No. 7" license plate on the EDSA busway reserved for high-ranking officials.

== Political career ==
In the 2025 Philippine general election, Gatchalian ran for the congressional seat of Valenzuela's 1st district under the Nationalist People’s Coalition. He won the seat with 80,410 votes, narrowly defeating former Vice Mayor Tony Espiritu, who received 79,629 votes. He succeeded his younger brother, Rex Gatchalian, who vacated the post upon his appointment as Department of Social Welfare and Development secretary in 2023.

== Personal life ==
Gatchalian is married to Mary Jeanette Kuo. His daughter, Lexi Gatchalian, is the incumbent president of the Senate Spouses Foundation Inc. since 2026, a role typically held by the spouse of the sitting Senate President, because her uncle Win Gatchalian is unmarried.

== Electoral history ==
Electoral history of Kenneth Gatchalian
| Year | Office | Party | Votes received | | | | Result |
| Year | Office | Party | Total | % | P. | Swing | Result |
|---|---|---|---|---|---|---|---|
| 2025 | Representative (Valenzuela–1st) | NPC | 80,410 | 49.45% | 1st | —N/a | Won |

House of Representatives of the Philippines
| Preceded by Rex Gatchalian | Member of the House of Representatives from Valenzuela's 1st district 2025–present | Incumbent |
