= Charee Pineda =

Filipino actress

The Honourable Charee Pineda-Soledad

Member of the Valenzuela City Council from the 2nd district
- In office June 30, 2013 – June 30, 2022

Sangguniang Kabataan Chairman of Barangay Parada, Valenzuela City
- In office November 30, 2007 – November 30, 2010

Personal details
- Born: Crissha Charity Morrison Pineda; 27 September 1990 (age 36) Manila, Philippines
- Party: NPC
- Spouse: Martell Soledad (m. 2020)
- Relations: Jennylyn Mercado (cousin) Eliza Pineda (sister) Enzo Pineda (cousin)
- Children: 1
- Education: Arellano University (AB)
- Occupation: Public servant, Politician, Actress

Charee Pineda-Soledad (born Crissha Charity Morrison Pineda on 27 September 1990) is a Filipina actress, politician and one of ABS-CBN's Star Magic artists. Her career began when she was cast as the "sweetilicious" girl on ABS-CBN's defunct teen sitcom Let's Go. She is best known for playing the roles of Marissa Ocampo in Katorse, Jeri Cenarosa in Precious Hearts Romances Presents: Alyna and Rosalie Dimaano in Angelito: Batang Ama and Angelito: Ang Bagong Yugto where she was paired up with JM De Guzman. She has since transferred to GMA Network and has done multiple supporting roles.

As a politician, she is a former councilor of the city of Valenzuela.

== Early life and education ==
Pineda was born on 27 September 1990 as a daughter of Eloy and Precy Pineda. She took her elementary education at the Maysan Elementary School and graduated in 2002. She continued her secondary education at the Colegio Sto. Niño de Valenzuela. For college, she attended the Arellano University, earning a Bachelor of Arts degree majoring in Political Science in 2015. She also finished a two-year course at the SKD Academy for Culinary Arts.

== Career ==
Pineda began her career as a print ad model of beauty products and did freelance modeling jobs. She first appeared as an actress in the GMA-7 afternoon drama show Ikaw Sa Puso Ko as the jealous Mirasol. Becky Aguila took her wings as manager and became a freelancer for a while, working for both networks, ABS-CBN and GMA Network. In 2006, she was seen in the Kapamilya station (ABS-CBN) and became a part of the Saturday Barkada show Let's Go as Charie, the crush ng bayan. She was paired with majority of the guys in the show. Alex Gonzaga, Eda Nolan, Joem Bascon and Mikel Campos are graduates of the said show.

After her stint in Let's Go, Pineda accepted the offer of the Kapuso network to appear in the drama show Impostora as Trish, the other party of the Martin Escudero and Jennica Garcia love team. The writers decided to kill her character because of the conflict between GMA Network and her manager, Becky Aguila. She then moved back to the Kapamilya network and appeared in Lovespell with Gee-Ann Abrahan, Mickey Perz and Bodie Cruz.

In 2008, she won her first major acting award via Alon, a Cinema One Originals 2008 entry, and received the Best Actress award. She is the youngest recipient of the Best Actress award in Cinema One Originals.

In 2011, she played as the main female protagonist in Angelito: Batang Ama as Rosalie Dimaano and again in 2012 in Angelito: Ang Bagong Yugto. This was her last show on ABS-CBN. In 2013, she transferred to GMA Network and was part of the drama series Akin Pa Rin ang Bukas as main antagonist Agatha Morales. In 2014, she starred on the drama series The Borrowed Wife as Maricar. In 2015, she starred on the drama series The Rich Man's Daughter as Angeline San Jose. In 2017, she starred on the fantasy drama series Mulawin vs. Ravena as Savannah Montenegro. In 2018, she starred on the drama series Hindi Ko Kayang Iwan Ka as Rosanna Balagtas.

== Politics ==
Pineda first served as Sangguniang Kabataan (SK) chairman of Barangay Parada, Valenzuela City from 2007 to 2010. She later ran for city councilor of Valenzuela from the 2nd district in 2013 and won. She was re-elected in 2016 and in 2019.

== Filmography ==
=== Film ===
Year	Title	Role	Remarks
2007	Green Paradise	Anita	
2007	A Love Story	Stacey	
2008	Sisa	Maria Clara	
2008	Alon (Sea Waves)	Vanni	Won Best Actress
2009	Nostalgia	–	
2011	Catch Me, I'm in Love	Charms	
2012	Biyaheng Kariton Klasrom	Sheryl	
2013	Bingoleras	Mimi	

=== Television ===
Year	Title	Role
2004	Ikaw sa Puso Ko	Mirasol
2005	Bubble Gang	Herself
2005	Etheria: Ang Ikalimang Kaharian ng Encantadia	Marge
2006	Love to Love	
2006–2007	Let's Go	Charie
2007	Love Spell presents: Bumulaka Bulalakaw Boom	Shawna
2007	Impostora	Trish Alvarado
2008	Maynila	
2009	Parekoy	Toni
2009	Maalaala Mo Kaya: Bulaklak	
2009	Katorse	Marissa Ocampo
2009	Maalaala Mo Kaya: Cross Stitch	Ana
2010	Precious Hearts Romances Presents: Midnight Phantom	Karen Castillo
2010	Precious Hearts Romances Presents: Alyna	Jeni Cenarosa
2010	Maalaala Mo Kaya: School ID	Marilyn
2010	Agimat: Ang Mga Alamat ni Ramon Revilla: Bianong Bulag	Clarissa
2010	Untold Stories Mula sa Face to Face	
2010	5 Star Specials: Johnny Salamangkero	
2010	Maynila: Waiting in Love	Ona
2011	Showtime	Judge (for 2 weeks)
2011	Maalaala Mo Kaya: Wig	Jenaida
2011	Mula sa Puso	Kate Dela Cruz
2011	Wansapanatym: Ang Bagong Car ni Carl	Angela
2011	Maalaala Mo Kaya: Tumba-Tumba	Becky
2011	Angelito: Batang Ama	Rosalie Dimaano
2012	Angelito: Ang Bagong Yugto	Rosalie Dimaano
2013	Maalaala Mo Kaya: Puntod	Merlinda
2013	My Little Juan	Esther Sandoval
2013	Never Say Goodbye	young Criselda Madrigal
2013	Akin Pa Rin ang Bukas	Agatha Morales / Agathalia
2014	The Borrowed Wife	Maria Carlotta "Maricar" Perez-Santos / Sandra Navarro / Sylvia Ignacio
2014	Magpakailanman:Gas mo, bukas ko	Cynthia
2015	The Rich Man's Daughter	Angeline San Jose
2015	Magpakailanman: Ang lolang mapagbiro: The Josefina Arellano Story	Young Pina
2017	Mulawin vs. Ravena	Savanna Montenegro
2018	Hindi Ko Kayang Iwan Ka	Rosanna "Anna" Balagtas
2021	Babawiin Ko ang Lahat	Minnie

- Kroko: Takas sa Zoo
- SPARKada Trip
- The Source with Pinky Webb
