= Eric Martinez =

Filipino politician (born 1972)

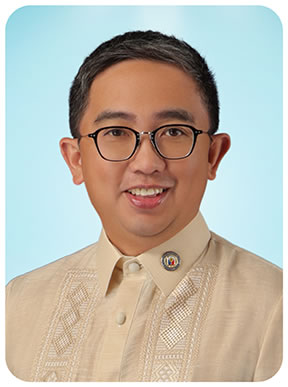
- Official portrait, 2022

Member of the House of Representatives from Valenzuela's 2nd district
- In office June 30, 2016 – June 30, 2025
- Preceded by: Magi Gunigundo
- Succeeded by: Gerald Galang

Deputy Speaker of the House of Representatives
- In office December 7, 2020 – June 30, 2022
- Speaker: Lord Allan Velasco

Vice Mayor of Valenzuela
- In office June 30, 2007 – June 30, 2016
- Mayor: Win Gatchalian (2007–2013); Rex Gatchalian (2013–2016)
- Preceded by: Antonio Espiritu
- Succeeded by: Lorie Natividad-Borja

Member of the Valenzuela City Council from the 2nd district
- In office June 30, 2001 – June 30, 2007

Personal details
- Born: Eric Morales Martinez; May 3, 1972 (age 54) Sampaloc, Manila, Philippines
- Party: Independent (2024–present)
- Other political affiliations: PDP (2015–2024); Liberal (2009–2015); NPC (2007–2009); Lakas–CMD (until 2007)
- Spouse: Katherine Martinez
- Education: University of Santo Tomas (no degree)
- Occupation: Politician

Eric Morales Martinez (Tagalog pronunciation: [ˈɛrik mɔˈralɛs mɐrˈtinɛs]; born May 3, 1972) is a Filipino politician who was a member of House of Representatives from Valenzuela's 2nd district from 2016 to 2025. He also served as the House Deputy Speaker for 18th Congress from 2020 to 2022.

== Early life and education ==
Martinez was born in Sampaloc, Manila. on May 3, 1972. In 1989, he enrolled at University of Santo Tomas for his college education, taking up Bachelor of Science in Commerce, major in Business Administration. However, he left the university in 1995 without completing the degree.

== Early career ==
Martinez was president of Liturgy of Music of National Shrine of Our Lady of Fatima in 1995 and a music teacher at St. Patrick School from 1997 to 1998. He also became Board of Director of Philippine National Red Cross of Valenzuela Chapter. He attended primary and secondary education at Notre Dame of Greater Manila.

== Political career ==
Martinez first served in Barangay Marulas, Valenzuela as member of Sangguniang Kabataan from 1993 to 1997 and as barangay kagawad from 1997 to 2001. He was later elected councilor of Valenzuela from the 2nd district in 2001, serving for two terms until 2007.

=== Vice Mayor ===
In 2007, Martinez won his first term as Vice Mayor of Valenzuela City as a member of Lakas–CMD, together with re-elected mayor Win Gatchalian. In 2010, Martinez sought for his second term as vice mayor, this time as a member of Liberal Party, after Lakas–Kampi–CMD (the successor of Lakas–CMD) nominated Marcelino Morelos as the vice mayoralty candidate instead of him. Martinez was later re-elected. In 2013, he ran again for his third term as vice mayor of the city while former mayor Win Gatchalian ran as representative of Valenzuela's 2nd district because he is unable to run for the position once more due to being term limited. Instead, his brother Rex Gatchalian won 2013 Valenzuela local elections as mayor of the city.

=== Congress ===
==== 17th Congress ====
In 2016, Martinez was elected for his first term as representative for Valenzuela's 2nd district representative.

==== 18th Congress ====
In 2019, he was re-elected representative for Valenzuela's 2nd district representative, defeating his predecessor Magi Gunigundo.

On July 10, 2020, Martinez voted to reject the franchise renewal of ABS-CBN together with Valenzuela's 1st district representative Wes Gatchalian and 68 other congressmen. On October 6, 2020, Martinez was removed as chairman of the House committee on youth and sports development.

==== 19th Congress ====
In 2022, Martinez sought re-election for his third and last term as Valenzuela's 2nd district representative. His candidacy received endorsement from President Rodrigo Duterte. He was re-elected to his third term in 2022, beating former representative Magi Gunigundo once again.

=== Senate bid ===
Upon being term-limited as representative, Martinez filed his candidacy to run in the 2025 Senate election as an independent. Despite running an independent campaign, he remained as Partido Demokratiko Pilipino's vice president for Luzon but chose not to be included in the party's senatorial slate to "discharge" himself from "any political bandages." On May 7, 2025, Task Force Baklas filed a disqualification case against Martinez for allegedly failing to remove illegal campaign materials. Martinez later lost his Senate bid.
