= Rex Gatchalian =

Secretary of Social Welfare and Development (born 1979)

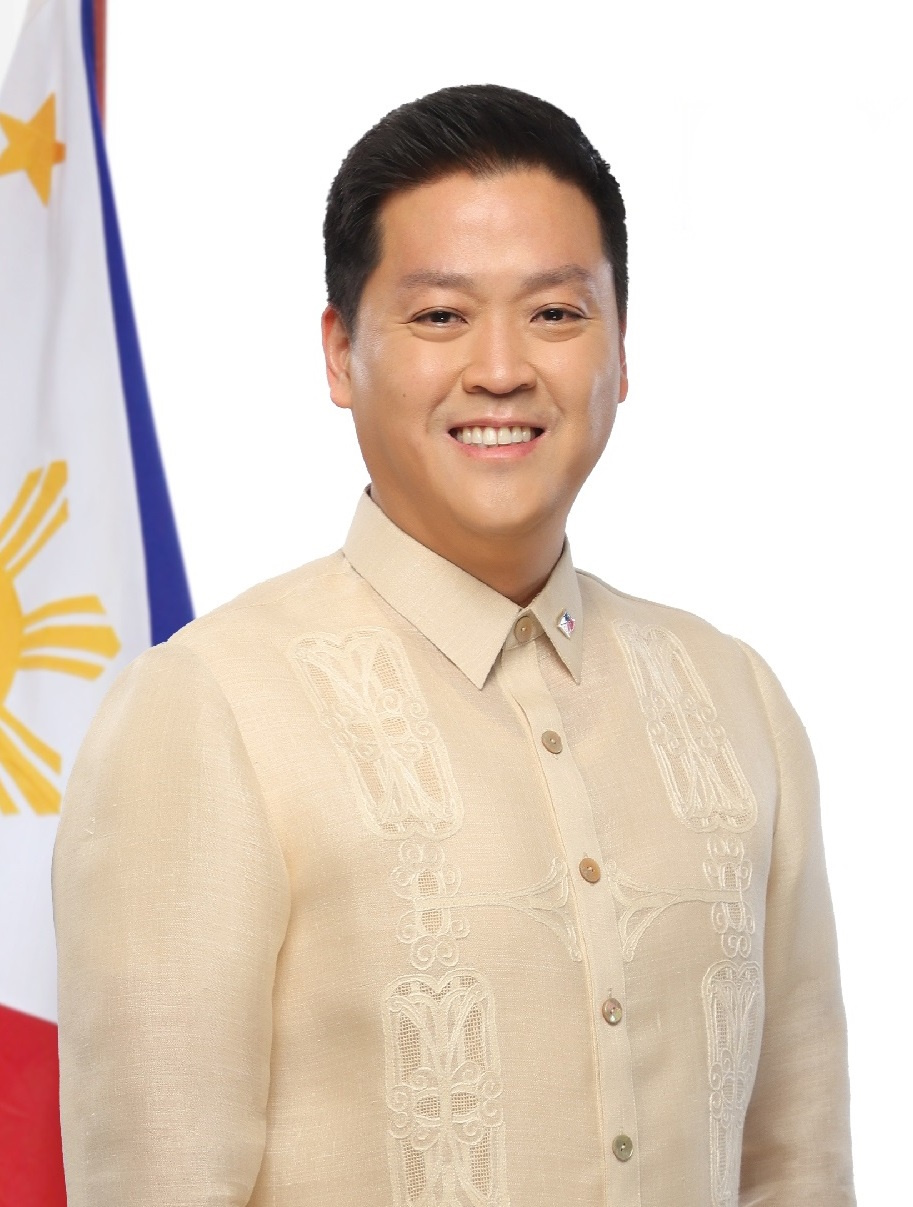
- Official portrait, 2023

29th Secretary of Social Welfare and Development
- Incumbent
- Assumed office January 31, 2023
- President: Bongbong Marcos
- Preceded by: Eduardo Punay (OIC)

Member of the Philippine House of Representatives from Valenzuela's 1st district
- In office June 30, 2022 – January 31, 2023
- Preceded by: Wes Gatchalian
- Succeeded by: Kenneth Gatchalian
- In office June 30, 2007 – June 30, 2013
- Preceded by: Bobbit Carlos
- Succeeded by: Win Gatchalian

26th Mayor of Valenzuela
- In office June 30, 2013 – June 30, 2022
- Vice Mayor: Eric Martinez (2013–2016); Lorena Natividad-Borja (2016–2022)
- Preceded by: Win Gatchalian
- Succeeded by: Wes Gatchalian

Personal details
- Born: Rexlon Ting Gatchalian; January 21, 1979 (age 47) Manila, Philippines
- Party: NPC (2004–present)
- Relations: Win Gatchalian (brother); Kenneth Gatchalian (brother); Wes Gatchalian (brother)
- Education: George Washington University (BA, BS)
- Profession: Politician

Rexlon "Rex" Ting Gatchalian (born January 21, 1979) is a Filipino politician who has served as the 28th secretary of social welfare and development since 2023. He previously served as the representative of Valenzuela's first district from 2007 to 2013 and from 2022 to 2023 and as mayor of Valenzuela from 2013 to 2022. He is the brother of politicians Win and Wes Gatchalian.

== Early life and early career ==
Gatchalian was born on January 21, 1979, to industrialist William Gatchalian and Dee Hua Ting. He is the third of four siblings, namely Sherwin, Kenneth, and Weslie. The Gatchalian family identifies as Christian with Dee Hua being a pastor and chairman at their own church called Jesus our Life Ministries in Barangay Maysan, Valenzuela. He completed his primary and secondary education at Xavier School in San Juan, Metro Manila.

He started his career as a sales assistant or special projects coordinator for Air Philippines Inc. in 1998. He then became a special assistant to the President/CEO of the Philippines Estates Corporation. He served as an intern of Political Affairs Group in 2000 and as a paralegal for Williams and Connelly, LLP in Washington, D.C. in 2001. He later graduated cum laude in 2001 from the George Washington University in Washington, D.C., United States, with a bachelor's degree in political science, with secondary fields of study in marketing and psychology.

In 2001, he was named vice president for sales & marketing of Waterfront Hotels and Casinos, the country's largest Filipino-owned first-class hotel operator. One year later, he was named as its executive vice president for hotel operations. In 2005, he was elected president of Waterfront Hotels and Casinos.

== House of Representatives of the Philippines ==
=== Elections ===
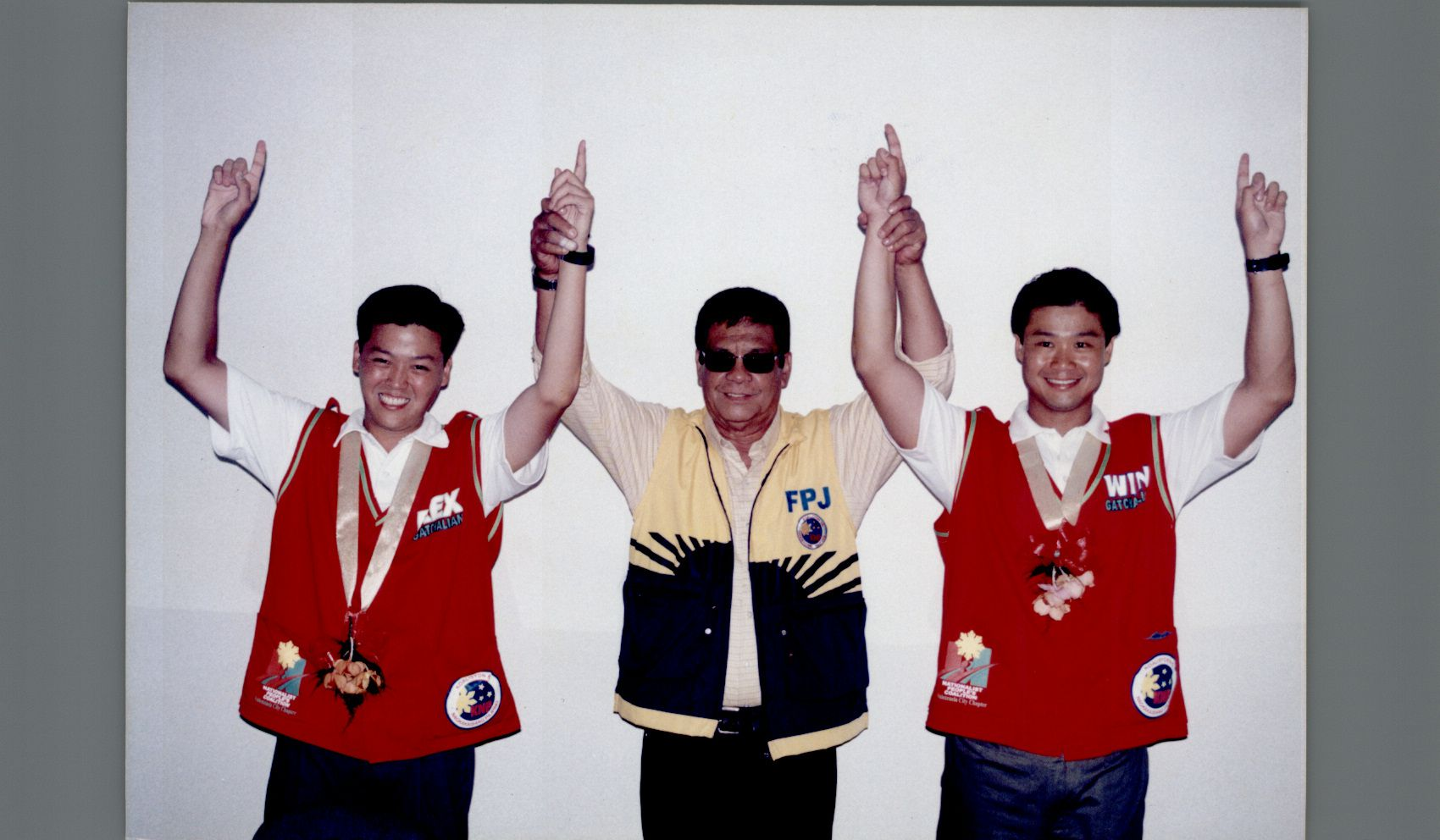
Rex Gatchalian (left) and his brother Win (right) with Fernando Poe Jr. (center) in 2004

Gatchalian first ran for representative of the first district of Valenzuela, in 2004 but lost to outgoing Mayor Bobbit Carlos.

In 2007, Gatchalian ran for representative of the first district of Valenzuela again and was successful this time. He was one of the youngest legislators during the 14th Congress.

In 2010, Gatchalian was re-elected as representative of the first District of Valenzuela for the 15th Congress with the largest electoral margin in the district's history.

=== Tenure ===
As Vice-chairman for the Congressional Committee for Overseas Workers’ Affairs, he authored Republic Act No. 10022, also known as An Act Amending R.A. 8042, otherwise known as the Migrant Workers and Overseas Filipinos Act of 1995. The law mandates new policies for the further protection and genuine representation of migrant workers. He is also one of the principal authors of Republic Act No. 9576, or the law that doubles the maximum deposit insurance coverage by the Philippine Deposit Insurance Corporation (PDIC) from ₱250,000 to ₱500,000. It was also during his first term as Representative that he was elected as National Spokesperson for the political party Nationalist People's Coalition (NPC).

At the age of 31, he became the youngest member of the Commission on Appointments in history, and the only Congressional Representation from the City of Valenzuela to be a member. He also served as the Senior Vice-chairman for the Congressional Committee on Games & Amusements.

== Mayor of Valenzuela (2013–2022) ==
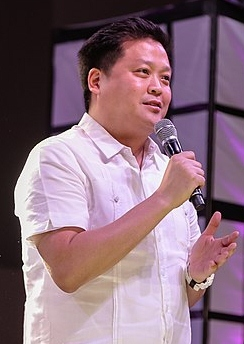
Mayor Gatchalian speaking to his constituents

Gatchalian was elected mayor of Valenzuela in 2013. He was re-elected in 2016 and in 2019.

His public service platform, better known as the “Five Pillars of Good Governance,” focused on the essential needs of his constituents: Education, Health and Social Services, Housing, Job Generation, and Trade and Industry.

He oversaw the creation of 48 barangay health stations (BHS) city-wide and the 14 Sentro ng Sama-Samang Serbisyo or 3S Centers as well as the ALERT Center, the Valenzuela City's Peoples Park, and the Valenzuela School of Mathematics and Science.

=== Programs ===
Other programs developed under his term as a Mayor include:

- 3S Plus Electronic Terminal - the Philippines’ first electronic building permit application system
- Bantay Estudyante – the first senior citizen-force multiplier group that protects the safety of children who walk their way to public schools
- Bantay Ilog – the first local flood control arm that safeguards the city' rivers and creeks from pollutants
- Barangay-Based Feeding Program (BBFP) – the local government's free supply of nutritious, ready-to-cook food for malnourished children aged six months to five years, provided that their parents regularly bring them to the barangay health station for weighing, check-up and vaccination
- Kitchen-on-Wheels – the mobile kitchen used by the City Social Welfare and Development Office (CSWDO) to immediately transport meals for typhoon victims or disaster-stricken communities
- Women's Wellness Clinic, Mobile Medical and Dental Clinics, and Mobile Botika (pharmacy) – the city government's mobile health facilities for medical missions and rescue operations
- VPOW or Valenzuela Police-on-Wheels - the first mobile police precinct in the country
- www.ValenzuelaTrabaho.gov.ph - the first job-matching website operated by a local government unit (LGU)
- Education 360 Degrees Investment Program- addresses education problems the city is facing. The program is a holistic approach to uplifting the quality of local basic education. The City Government of Valenzuela, through this program, distributed 24,000 tablets to public elementary and high school students making sure that no student is left behind in quality education.
- Disciplina Village Bignay, Ugong, Lingunan, Arkong Bato- Disciplina Village is the biggest in-city medium-rise public rental housing project in the country. It has a 3S Center, barangay health station, Police Community Precinct, Fire Substation, Barangay Hall and Daycare Center (aside from other four day care centers scattered among the clusters of buildings). It is complete with basic education facilities with the inclusion of the Disciplina Village Bignay Elementary and High School. The Activity Center/Covered Court and the mini park can be found at its heart. The construction of the Disciplina Village Transport Terminal, public market, and chapel are underway.
- 3S Plus Valenzuela Online Services- This is the first integrated permit application system in the country. It provides a single platform for the application of the permits and request for documents. The highlight of the system, is "Paspas Permit". Paspas Permit is a 10-second business permit application system.
- PPP Projects- Marulas Public Market, Valenzuela Town Center, Disciplina Village Bignay Transport Terminal at Public Market, expansion of Valenzuela Hemodialysis Center at Valenzuela Emergency Hospital.
- 3S Centers- 3S Centers, stand for "Sentro ng Sama-samang Serbisyo" are "little city halls" designed to bring the government services closer to local residents. As of December 2020, the city now has 24 3S centers.

=== Liveable Valenzuela City ===
After completing his projects for the 5 Pillars, Gatchalian's second wave of undertakings focused on transforming Valenzuela into a more liveable one. His notion of a liveable city essentially implies the presence of a leveled up infrastructure network and integrated sound protocols on logistics and management that will enable the city to respond to disasters and other challenges - hence, the birth of the ALERT Center (Allied Local Emergency and Evacuation Response Teams). The ALERT Center is the brain of the disaster preparedness and response of the city, and the roof of the Valenzuela Disaster Preparedness Office (DPO), the new Central Fire Station, Red Cross Volunteer Center, the Valenzuela Command and Coordinating Center (VCC3), and the VC Tent.

In 2014, Gatchalian started inaugurating the 3S Centers or the Sentro ng Sama-samang Serbisyo. The ‘little city halls’ house the fundamental satellite offices of the local government, such as the barangay health stations, fire substations, Serbisyo Centers (satellite offices for the payment of business permits, real property, and other government taxes), and many more.

On February 14, 2015, the city's 17th Charter Day, Valenzuelanos’ much awaited Valenzuela People's Park was officially opened to the public.

Another facility in the city that boasts of a nature-centered open space and is free to the public is the Valenzuela Family Park also in Karuhatan. There is a playground, interactive fountain, aviary, fitness machines, amphitheater, and a food park in the park. The park is also pet-friendly, bike-friendly, and accessible to persons with disability.

One of the many initiatives of the city government to create greener spaces, Polo Mini Park was inaugurated on January 21, 2020, six months after the announcement of the rehabilitation of the historical old town square of Polo. The park is adorned with hundred-years old luscious trees, fountain, memorial marker commemorating war veterans and statues of Pío Valenzuela and José Rizal. The park signifies not only a place for relaxation but also marks the historical identity of the city.

Described by Mayor Rex Gatchalian as Valenzuela City's "best kept secret", the Tagalag Fishing Village lies beside a 1.3 km (0.81 mi) boardwalk in Barangay Tagalag. The attraction offers activities such as recreational fishing, line fishing tutorials, bird watching, boating, photowalk, and sunset watching.

=== COVID-19 response ===
During the COVID-19 pandemic, Valenzuela was the first local government to conduct localized targeted mass testing. The city kicked off its own localized targeted mass testing for the coronavirus disease on April 11, 2020.

On September 12, 2020, the City Government of Valenzuela was able to acquire a COVID-19 testing laboratory license to operate for our Valenzuela Hope Molecular Laboratory, which complements the operation of the 24/7 Valenzuela Mega Contact Tracing Center. The laboratory can process 800 samples a day, and also accepts other cities' samples to be processed at Valenzuela Hope Molecular Laboratory.

In addressing the crowd and long lines in public markets, mobile palengkes were rolled out.

Valenzuela Tracing Application began to roll out on September 12, 2020. It is an automated contact tracing system through the use of QR codes, which provides safe, timely contact identification. ValTrace is also interconnected with Pasig and Antipolo.

Under the Alagang Valenzuelano program of Valenzuela, they distributed food vouchers to families in the city as well as care bags for children with disabilities and NutriPacks for kids enrolled at public daycare centers.

On January 10, 2021, the city government has also signed a deal for advance purchase of 640,000 doses of COVID-19 vaccine developed by AstraZeneca to vaccinate 320,000 individuals, 70% of the population of the city.

== House of Representatives of the Philippines (2022–2023) ==
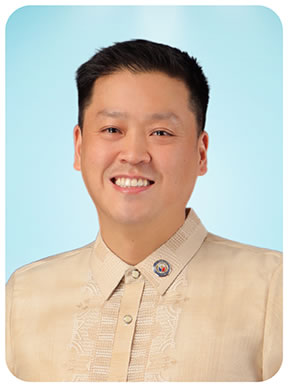
Official portrait of Gatchalian during the 19th Congress

Being term-limited for mayor, Gatchalian ran for representative of the first district of Valenzuela in 2022. He eventually won in an uncontested race. He was then elected as the Chairman of the Committee on Local Government of the House of Representatives in the 19th Congress.

== Secretary of Social Welfare and Development (2023–present) ==
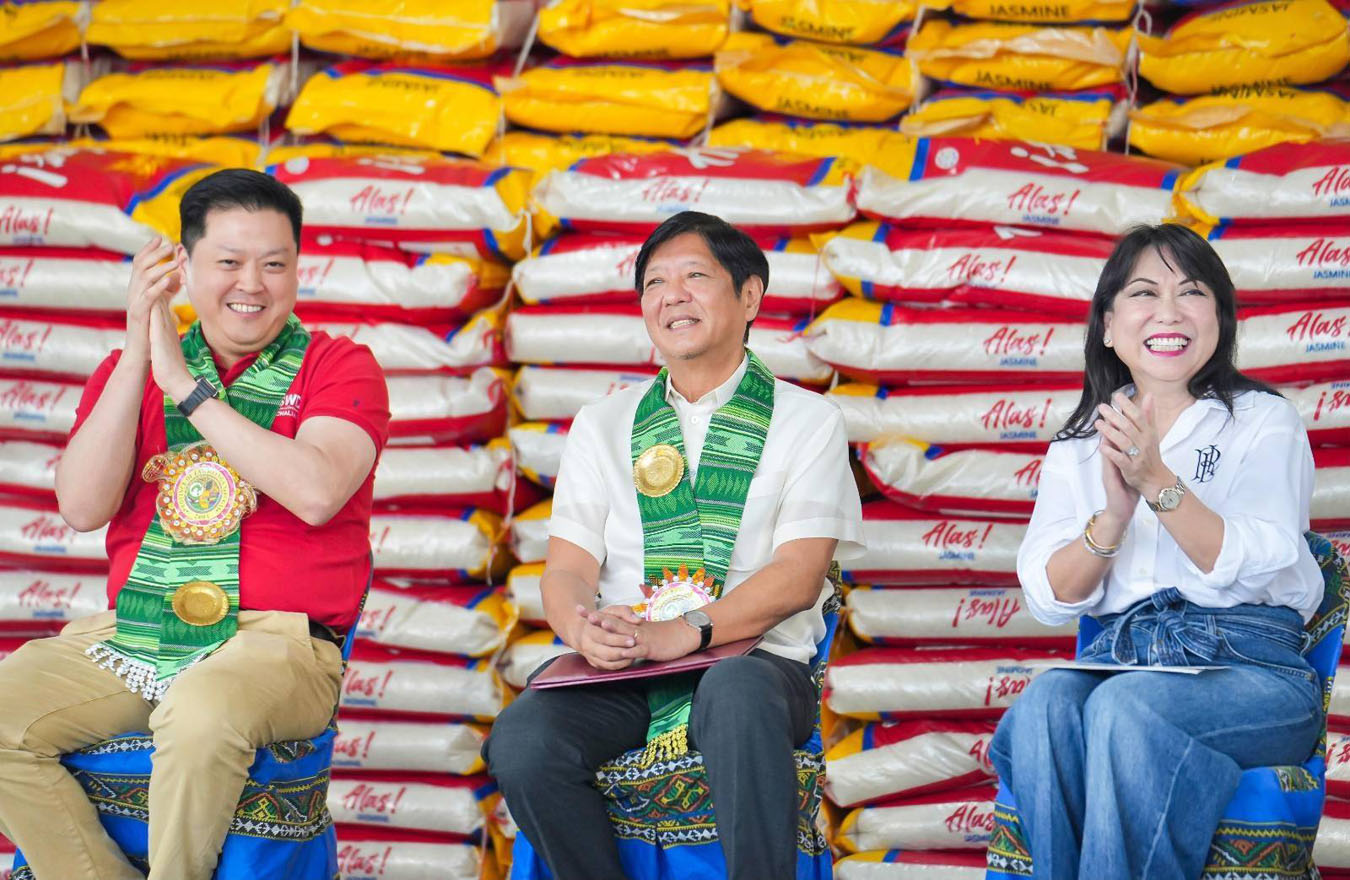
Gatchalian (left) with President Bongbong Marcos (center), who led the distribution confiscated smuggled rice to 4Ps beneficiaries in Tungawan, Zamboanga Sibugay on September 19, 2023

On January 31, 2023, Gatchalian was appointed by President Bongbong Marcos as secretary of social welfare and development; he took oath on the same day. With his appointment, he gave up his House Representative seat of the first district of Valenzuela.

On May 22, 2025, President Marcos ordered members of his cabinet to tender their courtesy resignations in the aftermath of the May 12, 2025 midterm elections. Gatchalian complied to this order. He will continue to serve as secretary until the President accepts the resignation.

== Electoral history ==
Electoral history of Rex Gatchalian
Year	Office	Party	Votes received				Result
Year	Office	Party	Total	%	P.	Swing	Result
2007	Representative (Valenzuela–1st)	NPC	36,251	—N/a	1st	—N/a	Won
2010	Representative (Valenzuela–1st)	NPC	74,977	90.43%	1st	—N/a	Won
2022	Representative (Valenzuela–1st)	NPC	141,794	100.00%	1st	—N/a	Unopposed
2013	Mayor of Valenzuela	NPC	144,282	67.71%	1st	—N/a	Won
2016	Mayor of Valenzuela	NPC	190,856	71.28%	1st	—N/a	Won
2019	Mayor of Valenzuela	NPC	248,911	96.7%	1st	—N/a	Won

== Awards and recognitions ==
Valenzuela earned several citations under the Gatchalian's leadership. The citations profess the city's economic accountability, livability and disaster preparedness, outstanding employment and micro-entrepreneurship development programs, timely health and social protection policies, and sound implementation of peace and order advocacies.

Valenzuela, led by Mayor Rex Gatchalian, landed three of the Top 10 Outstanding Local Governance Programs in Galing Pook Awards- Valenzuela Live, Tagalag Fishing Village and Paspas Permit.

House of Representatives of the Philippines
Preceded by Jose Emmanuel Carlos	Representative of the First District of Valenzuela; 2007–2013	Succeeded by Win Gatchalian
Preceded by Wes Gatchalian	Representative of the First District of Valenzuela; 2022–2023	Succeeded by Kenneth Gatchalian
Political offices
Preceded by Win Gatchalian	Mayor of Valenzuela; 2013–2022	Succeeded by Wes Gatchalian
Preceded by Eduardo Punay as OIC	Secretary of Social Welfare and Development; 2023–present	Incumbent
Order of precedence
Preceded by Jose Ramon Aliling as Secretary of Human Settlements and Urban Development	Order of Precedence of the Philippines as Secretary of Social Welfare and Development	Succeeded by Conrado Estrella III as Secretary of Agrarian Reform
