= Wes Gatchalian =

Filipino politician (born 1980)

- 張僑利
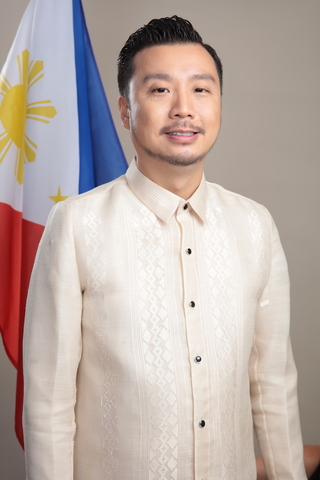
- Official portrait, 2022

27th Mayor of Valenzuela
- Incumbent
- Assumed office June 30, 2022
- Vice Mayor: Lorena Natividad-Borja (2022–2025); Marlon Alejandrino (2025–present)
- Preceded by: Rex Gatchalian

Deputy Speaker of the House of Representatives of the Philippines
- In office December 7, 2020 – June 30, 2022
- House Speaker: Lord Allan Velasco

Member of the Philippine House of Representatives from Valenzuela's 1st district
- In office June 30, 2016 – June 30, 2022
- Preceded by: Win Gatchalian
- Succeeded by: Rex Gatchalian

Member of the Philippine House of Representatives for Alay Buhay Partylist
- In office June 30, 2013 – June 30, 2016
- Succeeded by: Anton Sayo

Personal details
- Born: Weslie Ting Gatchalian; August 11, 1980 (age 46) Manila, Philippines
- Party: NPC (2006–present)
- Other political affiliations: Alay Buhay (2012–2016)
- Spouse: Tiffany Princess Chua
- Relations: Win Gatchalian (brother); Kenneth Gatchalian (brother); Rex Gatchalian (brother)
- Education: Bryant University; Oxford Brookes University (BA); London Metropolitan University (MA)
- Occupation: Politician
- Website: Official Website; Valenzuela Government

Weslie "Wes" Ting Gatchalian (Chinese: 張僑利; pinyin: Zhāng Qiáolì; born August 11, 1980) is a Filipino politician who has served as the 27th mayor of Valenzuela since 2022. A member of the Nationalist People's Coalition, Gatchalian was first elected to public office in 2013, as the party-list representative of Alay Buhay Partylist, serving until 2016, where he was elected as the district representative for Valenzuela's first district. As a representative, Gatchalian served as House Deputy Speaker from 2020 to 2022.

Gatchalian is a member of a political dynasty in the Philippines, being the brother of Senator Win Gatchalian and Social Welfare Secretary Rex Gatchalian, the latter of whom was succeeded by Wes as mayor of Valenzuela in 2022.

== Early life and education ==
Gatchalian was born on August 11, 1980, to industrialist William Gatchalian and Dee Hua Ting. He is the youngest of four siblings, namely Sherwin, Kenneth, and Rexlon. The Gatchalian family identifies as Christian with Dee Hua being a pastor and chairman at their own church called Jesus our Life Ministries in Barangay Maysan, Valenzuela.

He was assistant to the president of Waterfront Hotels and Casinos, the country's largest Filipino-owned first class hotel operator. He was also elected as president and CEO of Wellex Industries Inc.

Gatchalian received a secondary diploma at Xavier High School (1999), took business administration at Bryant University (2000), BA Honours Degree/DipHE Business and operations management second class and second division degree at Oxford Brookes University (2003), master's degree at London Metropolitan University, and took an executive course on legislation at UP National College of Public Administration and Governance.

== Political career ==
=== 2007 Congressional bid ===
Gatchalian ran for representative of Valenzuela's second district in 2007, losing to former Representative Magi Gunigundo.

=== Representative for the 16th to 18th Congress ===
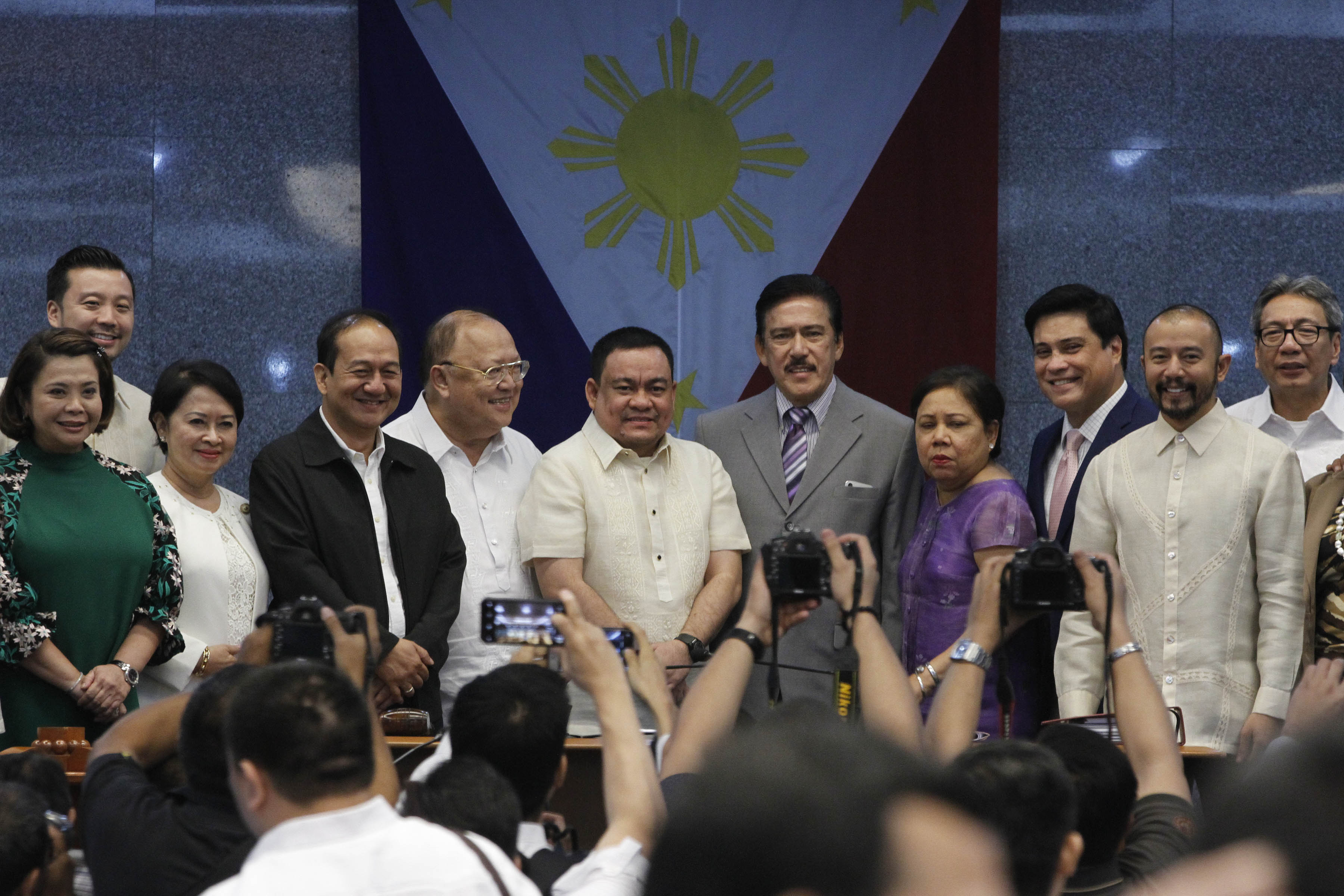
Gatchalian (second from left) and fellow members of the Commission on Appointments with Senate President Tito Sotto

==== 16th Congress ====
He was elected representative for the Alay Buhay Partylist in 2013.

Committee Membership:

- Chairman
  - Committee on Youth and Sports Development
- Vice Chairman
  - Committee on Overseas Workers Affairs
  - Committee on Small Business and Entrepreneurship Development
  - Committee on the XXXI Summer Olympic Games
- Membership
  - Committee on Cooperatives Development
  - Committee on Economic Affairs
  - Committee on Population and Family Relations

==== 17th Congress ====
In 2016 elections, Gatchalian was elected to his first term as the representative Valenzuela's first district, succeeding his brother Win.

==== 18th Congress ====
In the 18th Congress of the Philippines, Gatchalian was re-elected as representative of Valenzuela's first district for his second term as congressman. He is one of house deputy speakers of the Philippine House of Representatives since December 7, 2020.

He authored House Bill 02313. The purpose of House Bill 02313 is to mandate ownership registration for all pre-paid SIM cards to stop criminal activities through internet and specially to stop internet trolls. This was vetoed by the president.

On July 10, 2020, Gatchalian voted to reject the franchise renewal of ABS-CBN together with Valenzuela's 2nd district representative Eric Martinez and 68 other representatives.

One of his projects, the Wellness Entertain Sports (WES) Arena in Barangay Punturin, Valenzuela, was launched on October 7, 2021. Costing ₱310,000,000 with an area of 1.2 hectares (3.0 acres), it has various facilities like basketball court, badminton court, boxing ring, martial arts room, and dance studio. WES Arena is also one of venues of Bongbong Marcos 2022 presidential campaign.

=== Mayor of Valenzuela (2022–present) ===
Gatchalian was elected as the mayor of Valenzuela in the 2022 local elections, succeeding his brother Rex who had served since 2013. He was elected with 275,650 votes or 78.61% of the votes, defeating his sole opponent Bombit Bernardo who received 75,026 votes or 21.39% of the votes. In his campaign, he did not deny being part of a political dynasty, stating that there are good and bad political dynasties.

He took the oath of office on June 29, 2022, at WES Arena in Barangay Punturin, alongside his brother, Win, who was re-elected as senator. Among the attendees in his oath-taking were Vice Mayor Lorena Natividad-Borja, Representatives Rex Gatchalian and Eric Martinez, and Senator Imee Marcos. He is the member of his family to be the city's mayor, following his brothers Win and Rex.

== Personal life ==
Gatchalian is married to Tiffany Princess Chua.

== Electoral history ==
Electoral history of Wes Gatchalian
Year	Office	Party	Votes received				Result
Year	Office	Party	Total	%	P.	Swing	Result
2007	Representative (Valenzuela–2nd)	NPC	22,148	—N/a	2nd	—N/a	Lost
2013	Representative (Party-list)	Alay Buhay	317,355	1.15%	31st	—N/a	Won
2016	Representative (Valenzuela–1st)	NPC	92,541	74.26%	1st	—N/a	Won
2019	Representative (Valenzuela–1st)	NPC	119,372	100.00%	1st	—N/a	Unopposed
2022	Mayor of Valenzuela	NPC	275,650	78.61%	1st	—N/a	Won
2025	Mayor of Valenzuela	NPC	295,876	100.00%	1st	—N/a	Unopposed

Political offices
Preceded by Rex Gatchalian	Mayor of Valenzuela; 2022–present	Incumbent
House of Representatives of the Philippines
Preceded by Win Gatchalian	Member of the House of Representatives from Valenzuela's 1st district 2016–2022	Succeeded by Rex Gatchalian
