= Sherwin Gatchalian =

Filipino politician and businessman (born 1974)

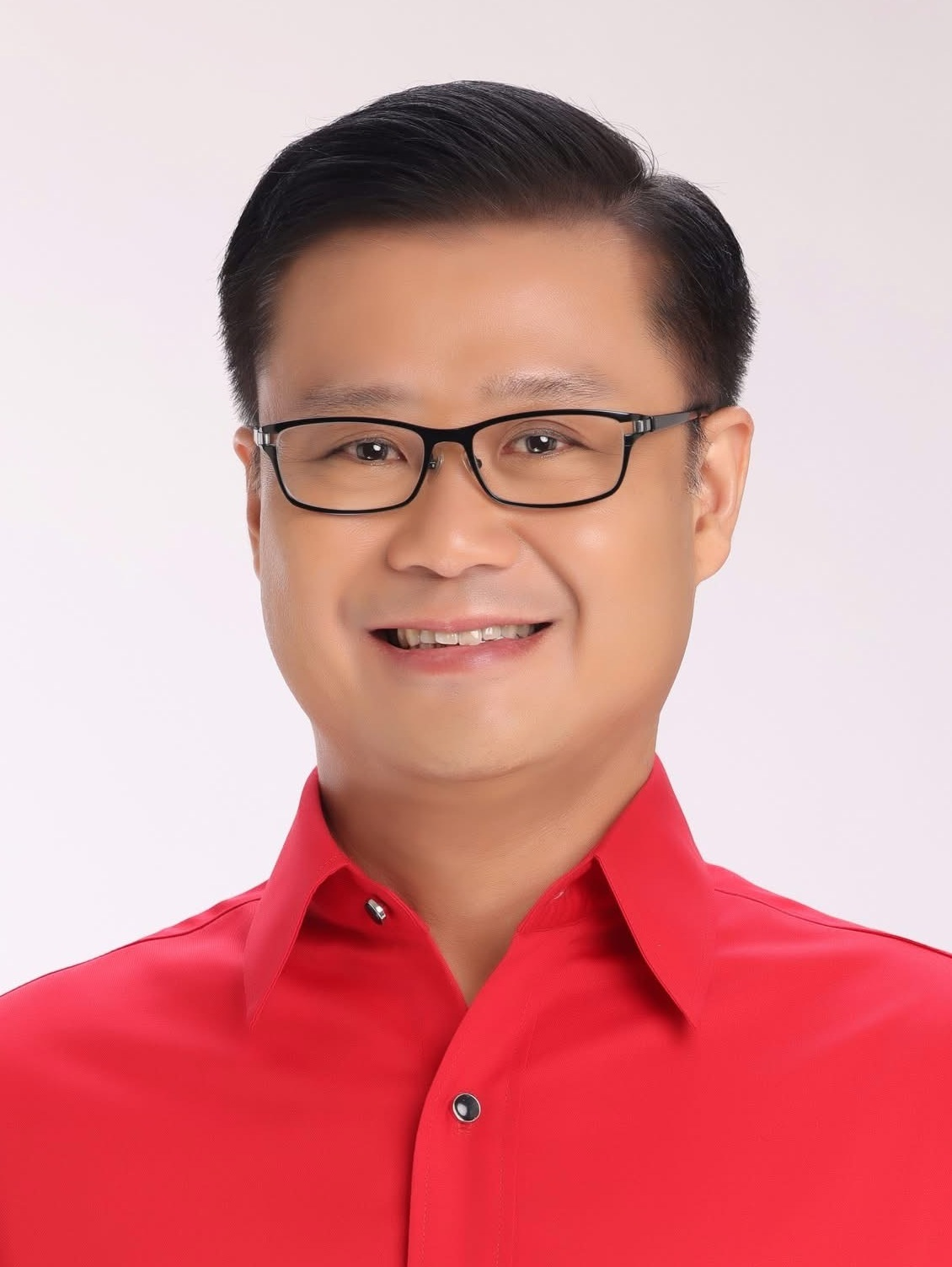
- Gatchalian in 2025

34th President of the Senate of the Philippines
- Incumbent
- Assumed office June 17, 2026 (Note: Acting from June 3, 2026 to June 17, 2026)
- Preceded by: Alan Peter Cayetano

President pro tempore of the Senate of the Philippines
- In office June 3, 2026 – June 17, 2026
- Preceded by: Loren Legarda
- Succeeded by: Tito Sotto

Senator of the Philippines
- Incumbent
- Assumed office June 30, 2016
Senate positions
Chair of the Senate Finance Committee
In office July 29, 2025 – May 11, 2026
Preceded by	Grace Poe
Succeeded by	Mark Villar
Chair of the Senate Ways and Means Committee
In office July 25, 2022 – June 30, 2025
Preceded by	Pia Cayetano
Succeeded by	Pia Cayetano
Chair of the Senate Basic Education Committee Basic Education, Arts and Culture Committee (2019–2022)
In office July 22, 2019 – June 30, 2025
Preceded by	Francis Escudero
Succeeded by	Bam Aquino

Member of the Philippine House of Representatives from Valenzuela's 1st district
- In office June 30, 2013 – June 30, 2016
- Preceded by: Rex Gatchalian
- Succeeded by: Wes Gatchalian
- In office June 30, 2001 – June 30, 2004
- Preceded by: New district
- Succeeded by: Jose Emmanuel Carlos

25th Mayor of Valenzuela
- In office June 30, 2004 – June 30, 2013
- Vice Mayor: Antonio Espiritu (2004–2007); Eric Martinez (2007–2013)
- Preceded by: Jose Emmanuel Carlos
- Succeeded by: Rex Gatchalian

Personal details
- Born: Sherwin Ting Gatchalian; April 6, 1974 (age 52) Manila, Philippines
- Party: Nationalist People's Coalition
- Relations: Kenneth Gatchalian (brother); Rex Gatchalian (brother); Wes Gatchalian (brother)
- Education: Boston University (BS)
- Occupation: Politician
- Profession: Businessman
- Website: Official website

Chinese name
- Traditional Chinese: 張僑偉
- Simplified Chinese: 张侨伟
Transcriptions
Standard Mandarin
- Hanyu Pinyin: Zhāng Qiáowĕi
Southern Min
- Hokkien POJ: Tiuⁿ Kiâu-úi

Sherwin "Win" Ting Gatchalian (born April 6, 1974) is a Filipino politician and businessman who has served as the 34th president of the Senate of the Philippines since 2026, a role he briefly held in an acting capacity as Senate president pro tempore. A member of the Nationalist People's Coalition, he is in his second term as a senator of the Philippines, having been elected to the chamber in 2016.

Based in Valenzuela, Metro Manila, Gatchalian previously served as the representative of the city's first district from 2001 to 2004 and from 2013 to 2016. From 2004 to 2013, he served as the 25th mayor of Valenzuela.

== Early life and education ==
Sherwin Ting Gatchalian was born to industrialist William Gatchalian and Dee Hua Ting. He is the eldest of four siblings, including namely Kenneth, Rex, and Wes Gatchalian. The Gatchalian family is of Chinese descent.

Gatchalian finished his elementary and secondary education at Grace Christian High School in the 1980s in Quezon City and graduated with a degree in Finance and Operations Management from Boston University in 1995.

== First term in Congress (2001–2004) ==
In 2001, Gatchalian was elected to the House of Representatives of the Philippines as the inaugural representative for Valenzuela's first district, which was established in 1998. He ran for the seat under the banner of the Nationalist People's Coalition, a party he would continue to affiliate with throughout his political career. His election started the first generation of politicians from his family, which includes Rex Gatchalian, who has served as secretary of social welfare and development since 2023, and Wes Gatchalian, who has served as the mayor of Valenzuela since 2022.

Gatchalian did chose not to seek re-election as representative to run for mayor of Valenzuela in 2004.

== Mayor of Valenzuela (2004–2013) ==
During his nine-year tenure as local chief executive, Gatchalian prioritized good governance in the City Government of Valenzuela. He aimed to deliver reforms that aimed to eradicate corruption, foster growth in the local business sector, and improve the provision of social services in education, health, in-city housing, and other key areas.

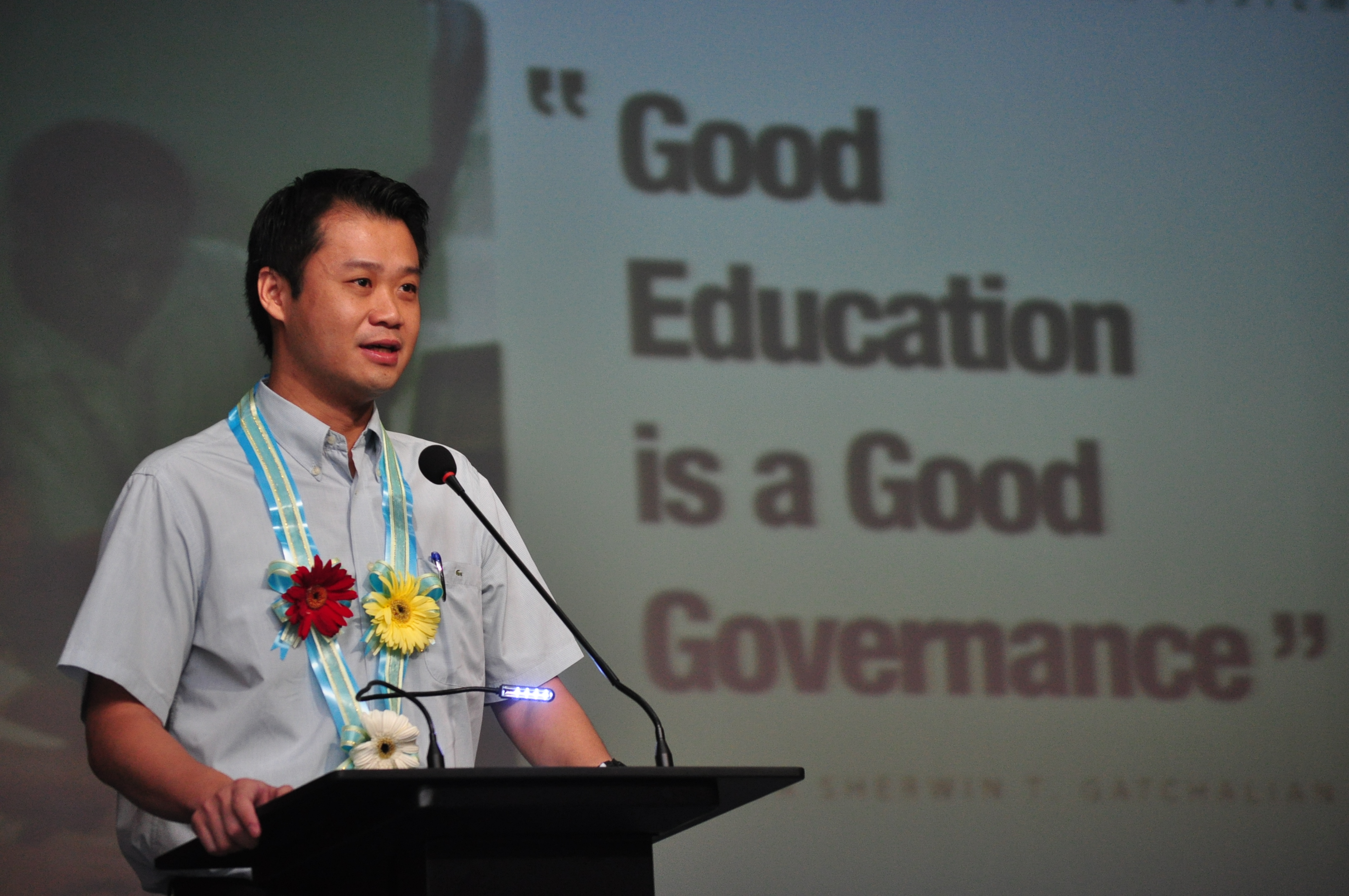
Gatchalian at the 3rd Alliance of Batangas Educators and School Administrators in 2012

While in office, Gatchalian institute the "Win ang Edukasyon Program" (lit. transl. Education Wins Program).

== Return to the House (2013–2016) ==
When Gatchalian returned to the Lower House in 2013, he filed education-related measures to increase the number of math and science high schools across the country and to establish a nationwide school-based feeding program for kinder and elementary students across the country. On July 6, 2015, he filed the original version of House Bill No. 5905, known as the Free Higher Education Act, that translated into the Universal Access to Quality Tertiary Education Act. He also supports the implementation of K–12 education in the Philippines as an investment for the future of younger generations.

Some of his other proposed bills during this term include acts regulating parking fees in malls and commercial areas, including the completion of the Reserve Officers' Training Corps program among the prerequisites for tertiary level graduation, increasing the budget for the Ninoy Aquino International Airport to transform its global image, abolishing the Road Board (a government agency that handled motor vehicle users' tax and road users' tax), protecting passengers against abusive and itinerant taxi drivers, for the declaration of candidates seeking to profit from election polls as nuisance candidates, as well as a proposed bill requiring proofs of parking space to car purchasers as a means to lessen traffic congestion.

== Senate (2016–present) ==
=== Elections ===
In June 2015, in an event in Quezon, Gatchalian announced his bid for a Senate seat in the 2016 general election. In October 2015, senator and presidential candidate Grace Poe announced her senatorial slate under the coalition Partido Galing at Puso which included Gatchalian. He eventually won, receiving 14,953,768 votes and placing 10th in the senatorial race.

Gatchalian presiding a Senate session during the 18th Congress inside the GSIS Building with other senators on remote locations via virtual conference during the COVID-19 pandemic, January 27, 2022.

In October 2021, he filed a certificate of candidacy to run for a second term as Senator. He was re-elected.

=== Tenure ===
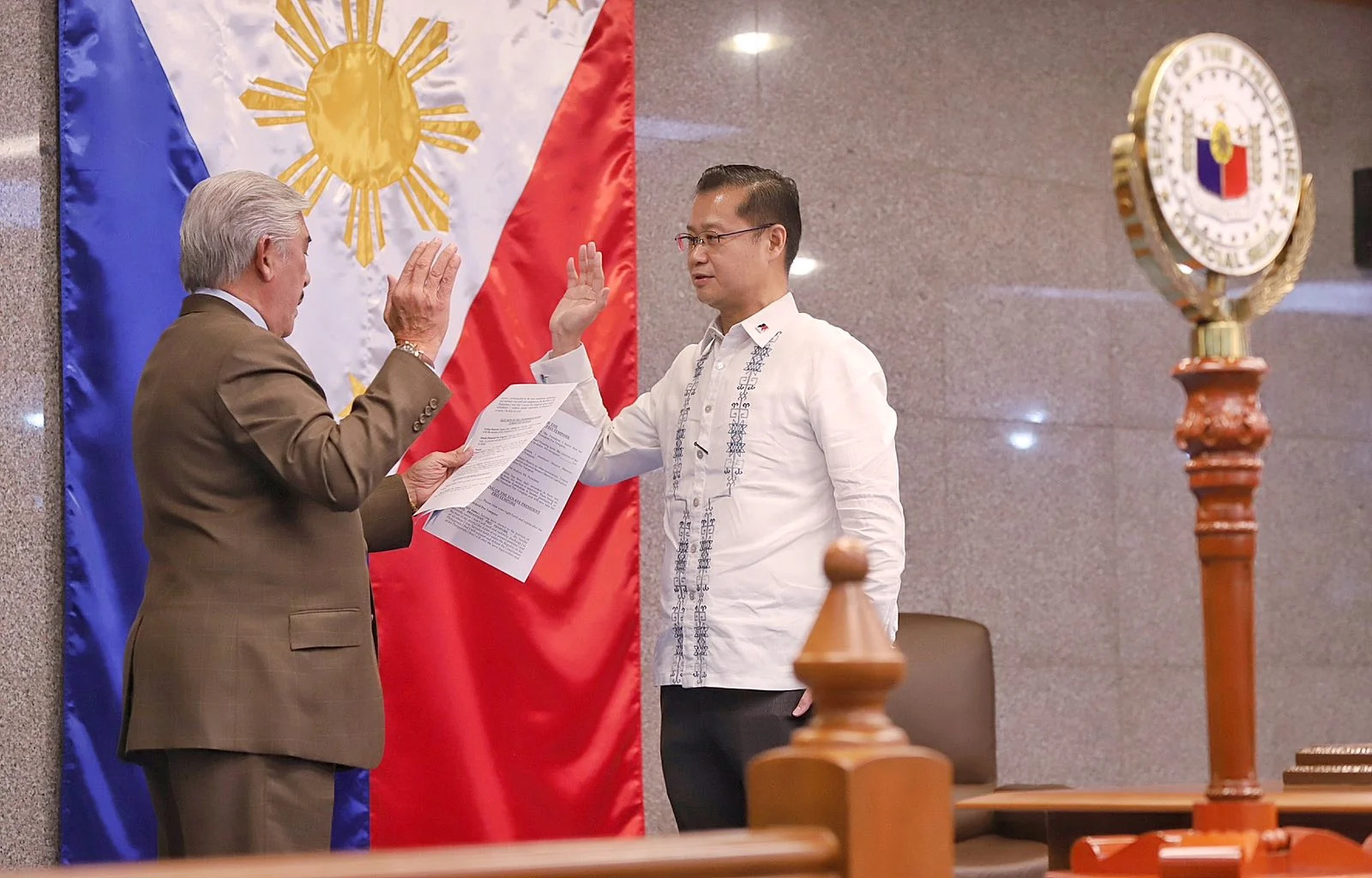
Gatchalian (right) is sworn in by Tito Sotto (left) as the new president pro tempore of the Senate on June 3, 2026. He was later designated as acting Senate president.

Upon being elected Senator, Gatchalian urged then-incoming President Rodrigo Duterte to make education reform a top priority of his administration. In the 17th Congress, Gatchalian served as chairman of the Committee on Energy and Committee on Economic Affairs. In the 18th Congress, he served again as the chairman of the energy committee and also of the Committee on Basic Education, Arts and Culture.

In July 2024, Gatchalian joined Risa Hontiveros on leading a Senate inquiry on Bamban mayor Alice Guo over her dubious Filipino citizenship status and links to a Philippine Offshore Gaming Operator in her town which was raided for involvement in suspected illicit activities.

In June 2026,, Gatchalian renewed push for his proposed Social Media Safety For Children Act (Senate Bill No. 2066) following the Tacloban school shooting.

== Senate presidency (2026–present) ==
=== Prelude ===
Following the election of Alan Peter Cayetano as Senate president on May 11, 2026, Gatchalian became part of the Senate minority bloc composed of 11 Senators led by Tito Sotto in an acting capacity. While in the minority, the faction had discussed a potential ouster of Cayetano from the post and consolidated their support behind Gatchalian as their preferred candidate for the position. By May 22, he had expressed his readiness to take the position, a plan that Cayetano acknowledged in the press.

=== Election ===
From June 1 to 2, the Cayetano bloc refused to attend Senate sessions following the arrest of Senator Jinggoy Estrada on plunder charges, which occurred on Senate premises. Their absence led to a legislative impasse, which prohibited the chamber from conducting any business due to a lack of a quorum, a consequence that led to Gatchalian's bloc calling for Cayetano's resignation.

On June 3, Gatchalian's bloc was joined by Senator Francis Escudero, allowing them to constitute a quorum to call a session on the day of the Senate's sine die adjournment. During the meeting, all elective positions, including the Senate presidency, were declared vacant, with Gatchalian elected as Senate president pro tempore and committee leaderships reshuffled among members of his faction. Without the 13 votes needed to elect the Senate presidency, the post remained vacant, with Gatchalian taking over the position in an acting capacity.

The outcome of the session, including Gatchalian's election as Senate president pro tempore, was recognized by both the House of Representatives and President Bongbong Marcos, together with the Integrated Bar of the Philippines, citing the bloc's application of the 1949 Supreme Court ruling Avelino v. Cuenco. However, Cayetano contested the legitimacy of the move and continued to claim the Senate presidency, filing a petition to the Supreme Court on June 16 to nullify the leadership change. That same day, Senator Erwin Tulfo confirmed that at least two of their colleagues were planning to back Gatchalian for the Senate presidency.

On June 17, Cayetano conceded that Gatchalian secured enough votes to be elected to the Senate presidency, ending the leadership dispute between their camps. Later that day, Gatchalian was formally elected Senate president in a special session, with Senator Joel Villanueva joining his bloc to complete the 13 votes needed for his election to the office by acclamation.

== Awards and recognition ==
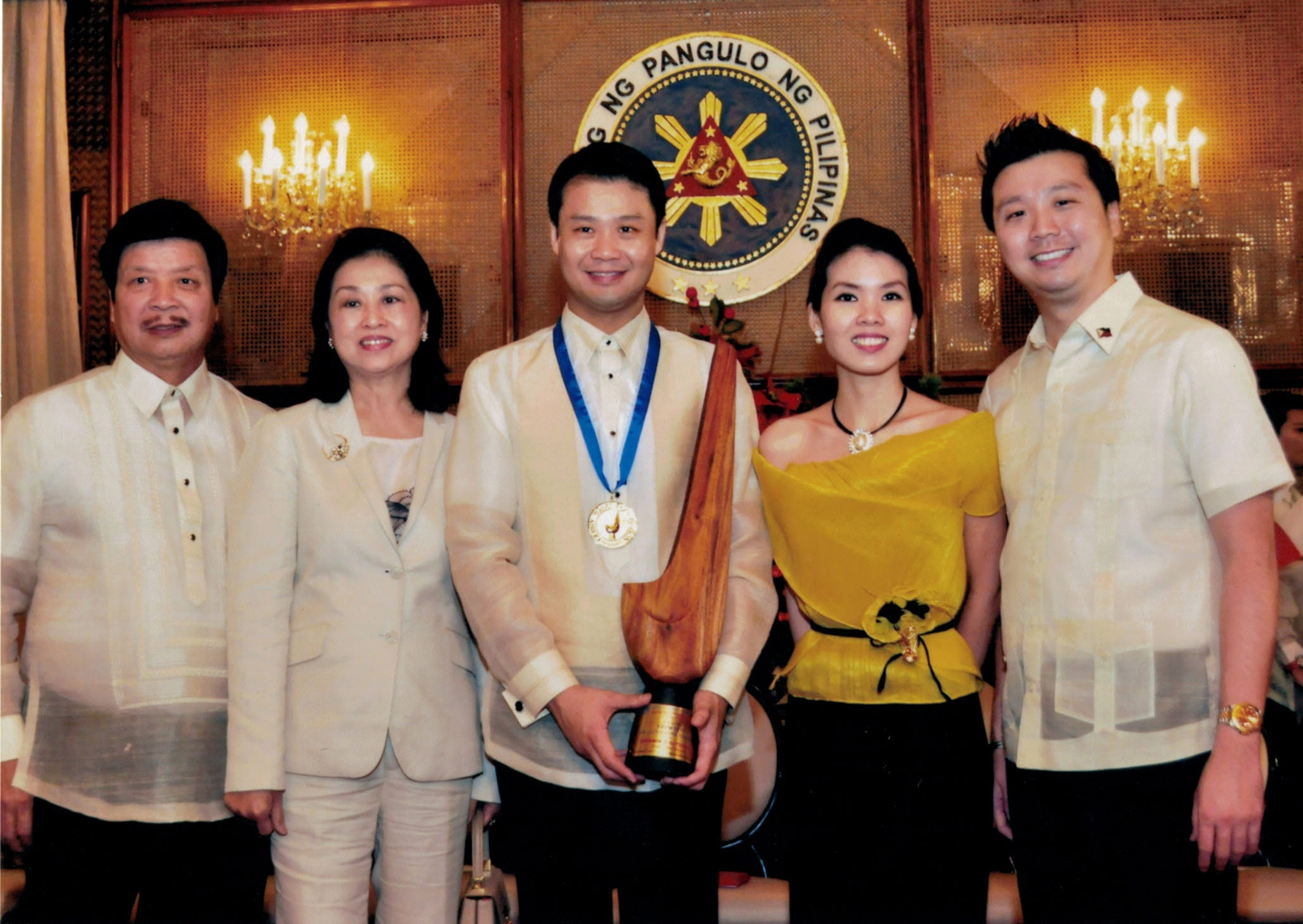
Gatchalian (center) receiving the award for The Outstanding Young Men 2011

Personal awards

- 69th Lee Kuan Yew Exchange Fellow (2019)
- International Peace Laureate for Public Service (2019)
- Manila 40 Under 40 International Development Leaders (2013)
- Public Service Honoree, The Outstanding Young Men, TOYM (2011)

== Personal life ==
In 2007, Gatchalian began a relationship with actress and television host Pauleen Luna. The couple separated in 2008. In 2018, he began dating actress and beauty queen Bianca Manalo. In an interview in January 2026, Gatchalian stated that his relationship was "non-existent", which was widely interpreted as confirmation that he and Manalo had ended their relationship.

== Electoral history ==
Electoral history of Sherwin Gatchalian
Year	Office	Party	Votes received				Result
Year	Office	Party	Total	%	P.	Swing	Result
2001	Representative (Valenzuela–1st)	NPC	28,404	—N/a	1st	—N/a	Won
2013	Representative (Valenzuela–1st)	NPC	67,992	70.05%	1st	—N/a	Won
2004	Mayor of Valenzuela	NPC	68,650	38.09%	1st	—N/a	Won
2007	Mayor of Valenzuela	NPC	82,576	51.82%	1st	+13.73	Won
2010	Mayor of Valenzuela	NPC	162,999	88.15%	1st	+36.33	Won
2016	Senator of the Philippines	NPC	14,953,768	33.25%	10th	—N/a	Won
2022	Senator of the Philippines	NPC	20,602,655	37.09%	4th	+3.84	Won

== Notes ==
House of Representatives of the Philippines
New district	Member of the House of Representatives from Valenzuela's 1st district 2001–2004	Succeeded by Bobbit Carlos
Preceded by Rex Gatchalian	Member of the House of Representatives from Valenzuela's 1st district 2013–2016	Succeeded by Weslie Gatchalian
Political offices
Preceded by Bobbit Carlos	Mayor of Valenzuela; 2004–2013	Succeeded by Rex Gatchalian
Senate of the Philippines
Preceded by Loren Legarda	President pro tempore of the Senate of the Philippines; 2026	Succeeded by Tito Sotto
Preceded by Alan Peter Cayetano	President of the Senate of the Philippines; 2026–present	Incumbent
Order of precedence
Preceded by Rodrigo Duterte as Former President	Order of Precedence of the Philippines as President of the Senate of the Philippines	Succeeded by Bojie Dy as Speaker of the House of Representatives of the Philippines
Lines of succession
Preceded by Sara Duterte as Vice President	Philippine presidential line of succession as President of the Senate of the Philippines	Succeeded by Bojie Dy as Speaker of the House of Representatives of the Philippines
