= Lorie Natividad-Borja =

Vice Mayor of Valenzuela since 2016

The Honorable Lorie Borja

Member of the Valenzuela City Council from the 2nd District
- Incumbent
- Assumed office June 30, 2025
- In office June 30, 2010 – June 30, 2016
- In office June 30, 1998 – June 30, 2007

Vice Mayor of Valenzuela
- In office June 30, 2016 – June 30, 2025
- Mayor: Rex Gatchalian (2016–2022); Wes Gatchalian (2022–present)
- Preceded by: Eric Martinez
- Succeeded by: Marlon Alejandrino

Sangguniang Kabataan Federation President Sectoral Youth Representative to the Valenzuela Municipal Council
- In office 1992–1996

Personal details
- Born: Lorena Carreon Natividad; August 10, 1974 (age 52) Philippines
- Party: NPC (1998–2009; 2012–present)
- Other political affiliations: Nacionalista (2009–2012)
- Children: 3
- Education: Manila Central University (BS); University of Makati (MDMG)
- Occupation: Politician

Lorena Natividad Borja (born Lorena Carreon Natividad; August 10, 1974), also known as Lorie Natividad, Lorie Natividad-Borja or Lorie Borja, is a Filipina politician currently serving as a councilor from the 2nd District since 2025. She previously served as the Vice Mayor of Valenzuela from 2016 to 2025 and councilor of Valenzuela from the same district from 1998 to 2007 and again from 2010 to 2016. She also served as the officer-in-charge of Valenzuela's Youth, Sports and Livelihood Development Office from 2007 to 2009 and a sectoral representative to the then-municipal council of Valenzuela as the president of Sangguniang Kabataan from 1992 to 1996.
