= List of schools in Pasig =

This is a list of schools in the city of Pasig, Metro Manila, Philippines.

== Exclusive primary education schools ==
- Angioletto Preschool
- Bagong Ilog Elementary School
- Bambang Elementary School
- Barney Metamorphosis Learning Academy
- Buting Elementary School
- Caniogan Elementary School
- De Castro Elementary School
- Dela Paz Elementary School
- Doctor Sixto Antonio Elementary School
- Francisco Legaspi Memorial School
- Ilugin Elementary School
- Kalawaan Elementary School
- Liberato Damian Elementary School
- Manggahan Elementary School
- Maybunga Elementary School
- Nagpayong Elementary School
- Napico Elementary School
- Oranbo Elementary School
- Palatiw Elementary School
- Pasig Elementary School
- Pinagbuhatan Elementary School
- Pineda Elementary School
- Rosario Elementary School
- Sagad Elementary School
- San Joaquin Elementary School
- San Lorenzo Ruiz Elementary School
- San Miguel Elementary School
- Santolan Elementary School
- Sta. Lucia Elementary School
- Sto. Niño Elementary School

== Exclusive secondary education schools ==
- Affordable Private Education Center, Inc. (APEC Schools)
- Buting Senior High School
- Dela Paz High School
- Eusebio High School
- Kapitolyo Senior High School
- Manggahan High School
- Nagpayong High School
- Pasig City Science High School
- Pinagbuhatan High School
- Rizal Experimental Station and Pilot School for Cottage Industries (RESPSCI)
- Rizal High School
- Sagad High School
- San Joaquin-Kalawaan High School
- San Lorenzo Ruiz Senior High School
- Santolan High School
- Sta. Lucia High School
- Ugong Pasig National High School

== Exclusive tertiary education schools ==
- Pamantasan ng Lungsod ng Pasig
- Rizal Technological University
- University of Asia and the Pacific

== Combined primary and secondary education schools ==
- ADT Montessori
- Asia Academic Integrated School
- Asia-Pacific Accelerated Christian School
- Colegio del Buen Consejo
- Creative Learning School, Inc.
- La Immaculada Concepcion School
- Niño Jesus House of Studies
- Pasig Christian Academy
- Pasig Community School
- Sacred Heart Academy of Pasig
- Saint Cecilia's Academy
- Santa Rosa Catholic School
- St. Paul College, Pasig
- Sto. Tomas de Villanueva Parochial School

== Combined primary, secondary, and tertiary education schools ==
- Arellano University
- La Consolacion College Pasig
- Pasig Catholic College

== International schools ==
- Domuschola International School
- Inocencio Integrated School
- Life Academy International
- Reedley International School
- Saint Gabriel International School

== Exclusive technical/vocational schools ==
- Capellan Institute of Technology

== Combined secondary education and technical/vocational schools ==
- Asia Source iCollege
- Asian Summit College Foundation

== See also ==
- List of schools in Metro Manila (primary and secondary)
- List of international schools in Metro Manila
- List of universities and colleges in Metro Manila
