= 1995 Valenzuela local elections =

1995 local elections in Valenzuela, Metro Manila, Philippines

- May 8, 1995
Candidate	Jose Emmanuel "Bobbit" L. Carlos	Santiago "Santy" de Guzman
Party	Lakas	NPC
Popular vote	62,555	43,140
Percentage	53.90	37.17
Mayor before election
Santiago "Santy" de Guzman
NPC
Elected mayor
Jose Emmanuel "Bobbit" L. Carlos
Lakas

Local elections were held in Valenzuela, Metro Manila, on May 8, 1995, as part of the 1995 Philippine general election. The nationwide election covered all local offices, the entire House of Representatives, and half of the Senate.

Valenzuela was a municipality at the time of the election; the law converting it into a highly urbanized city was approved in 1998. Voters elected a mayor, a vice mayor, and twelve members of the municipal council. They also voted for the representative of Valenzuela's lone congressional district. Former vice mayor Jose Emmanuel L. Carlos, commonly known as "Bobbit", of Lakas–NUCD defeated incumbent mayor Santiago "Santy" de Guzman of the Nationalist People's Coalition (NPC). Carlos's running mate, Evelyn "Jing" Hernandez, was elected vice mayor, while incumbent representative Antonio Serapio was reelected.

== Electoral system ==
The municipal mayor and vice mayor were elected separately at large by plurality vote, as provided by the Local Government Code of 1991. Under Republic Act No. 7887, Metro Manila municipalities had twelve councilors and were divided into two council districts for representation in the municipal council.

== Results ==
The municipal board of canvassers based its proclamation on the completed official tabulation from more than 1,000 precincts. The tables give the candidate vote totals reported in the contemporary account; it did not report blank or invalid ballots.

=== Mayor ===
Carlos defeated de Guzman by 19,415 votes.

1995 Valenzuela mayoral election
Candidate	Party	Votes	%
Jose Emmanuel "Bobbit" L. Carlos	Lakas–NUCD–UMDP	62,555	53.90
Santiago "Santy" de Guzman (incumbent)	Nationalist People's Coalition	43,140	37.17
Ernesto Roque	Nationalist People's Coalition	10,357	8.92
Total		116,052	100.00
Lakas–NUCD–UMDP gain from Nationalist People's Coalition			
Source: Commission on Elections

=== Vice mayor ===
Hernandez defeated de Guzman's running mate, Rida Santiago-Aznar, by 13,585 votes.

1995 Valenzuela vice mayoral election
Candidate	Party	Votes	%
Evelyn "Jing" Hernandez	Lakas–NUCD–UMDP	58,708	51.10
Rida Santiago-Aznar	Nationalist People's Coalition	45,123	39.27
Antonio Padrinao	Nationalist People's Coalition	11,059	9.63
Total		114,890	100.00
Lakas–NUCD–UMDP hold			
Source: Commission on Elections

=== House of Representatives ===
Valenzuela formed a single congressional district in 1995. Serapio was reelected over his nearest rival, Eddie Franco.

1995 Valenzuela Lone District Representative election
Candidate	Party	Votes	%
Antonio Serapio (incumbent)	Nationalist People's Coalition	55,126	67.03
Eduardo "Eddie" Franco	Lakas–NUCD–UMDP	17,129	20.83
Melencio Cea	Nacionalista Party	9,989	12.15
Total		82,244	100.00
Nationalist People's Coalition hold			
Source: Commission on Elections

=== Municipal council ===
The municipal board of canvassers proclaimed twelve winning councilors from Valenzuela's two council districts.

== Aftermath ==
The board of canvassers, headed by acting election registrar Adriano Abesamis, proclaimed Carlos, Hernandez, Serapio, and the twelve councilors at the municipal hall following the completion of the canvass. Carlos succeeded de Guzman as mayor, and Hernandez succeeded Carlos as vice mayor.
