= Geronimo Angeles =

22nd Mayor of Valenzuela
- In office January 1, 1968 – February 25, 1986
- Vice Mayor: Felipe Pasco (1968–1971); Isidoro Arenas (1972–1986)
- Preceded by: Ignacio Santiago Sr.
- Succeeded by: Wilfredo F. Chongco

Personal details
- Born: Geronimo Solapco Angeles; March 6, 1927 Polo, Bulacan, Philippine Islands
- Died: August 17, 2005 (aged 78)
- Party: KBL (1978–1986); Nacionalista (until 1978)
- Parent(s): Eugenio Angeles; Eufrocina Solapco
- Education: Ateneo de Manila University; Rizal High School
- Occupation: Politician, lawyer

Geronimo "Gerry" Solapco Angeles (March 6, 1927 – August 17, 2005), was a Filipino politician and lawyer who served as the Mayor of Valenzuela from 1968 to 1986. He holds the record as the longest-serving mayor in the history of the municipality, having governed the town for 18 consecutive years. He notably oversaw the historical transition of Valenzuela from being a municipality of the province of Bulacan into a highly urbanized entity within the newly formed Metropolitan Manila Commission.

== Early life and education ==
Angeles was born on March 6, 1927, in Barangay Isla in the town of Polo, Bulacan (the geographical predecessor to modern-day Valenzuela City). He was born to a prominent family; his father, Eugenio Angeles, served as an Associate Justice of the Supreme Court of the Philippines, and his mother was Eufrocina Solapco.

He received his primary education at the Polo Elementary School before attending the Ateneo de Manila University and Rizal High School for his secondary education. Pursuing a career in the legal field, he later studied law at the Manila Law College.

== Political career ==
Angeles entered local politics and was elected as the Mayor of Valenzuela, succeeding Ignacio Santiago Sr. He officially assumed office in 1968.

His extensive tenure encompassed several pivotal eras in modern Philippine history, including the pre-Martial Law era of the Third Philippine Republic and the entirety of President Ferdinand Marcos's military rule. One of the most significant administrative shifts during his leadership occurred in 1975, when Valenzuela was officially excised from the province of Bulacan and integrated into the National Capital Region (NCR) under the jurisdiction of the Metropolitan Manila Commission.

Angeles's administration initiated several major infrastructure projects, including the construction of the old city police headquarters beside the municipal hall in 1982. His continuous 18-year administration came to an abrupt end following the 1986 People Power Revolution. After the ouster of the Marcos administration, incoming President Corazon Aquino established a revolutionary government and replaced incumbent local executives nationwide. Angeles was removed from his post and replaced by Wilfredo F. Chongco, who was appointed as the Officer-in-Charge (OIC) mayor of Valenzuela.

Angeles died on August 17, 2005, at the age of 78.

== Legacy ==
In recognition of his nearly two decades of leadership and his role in modernizing the municipality's infrastructure and administrative capabilities, Angeles was awarded the Gawad Pio Valenzuela Award for Government Service in 1996.

To further commemorate his historical contributions to the city, the local government named the central finance building within the Valenzuela City Hall complex the Bulwagang Geronimo Angeles (Geronimo Angeles Hall). Today, the building houses the city's key planning, engineering, and financial divisions.
