= Mayor of Valenzuela =

Local chief executive of Valenzuela City, Philippines

- Punong Lungsod ng Valenzuela
- Seal of the City of Valenzuela

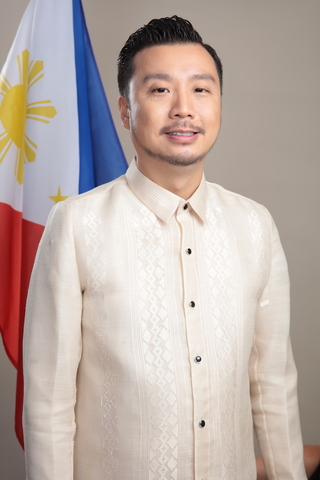
- Incumbent; Wes Gatchalian since June 30, 2022
- Style: (Mr.) Mayor, Honorable Mayor
- Appointer: None, elected via popular vote
- Term length: 3 years (Maximum of three consecutive terms)
- Inaugural holder: Pío Valenzuela
- Formation: September 6, 1899
- Salary: ₱334,104 (US$7,856.28, Aug 2011)
- Website: valenzuela.gov.ph

The mayor of Valenzuela (Filipino: Punong Lungsod ng Lungsod ng Valenzuela), a highly urbanized city in northern Metro Manila, Philippines, is the official head and chief executive of Valenzuela. He leads on enforcing city ordinances and improving public services. The mayor has a term of office of three years, but has a maximum electoral tenure of three consecutive terms. Inaugural holder of the office was Pío Valenzuela (1869–1956), served from 1899 to 1901, for whom the city was named.

During the Spanish colonial period, the town that composed of what is now Valenzuela, called before as Polo, was ruled by a gobernadorcillo appointed through an exclusive nomination provided by the Spanish law. Later in the American period, first mayor Pío Valenzuela was appointed as its first municipal president until his resignation in 1901. Since then, municipal presidents are elected by a popular vote.

The current 1987 Constitution of the Philippines and the City Charter of 1998 defined the position, powers and responsibilities of the mayor.

== List of mayors ==
=== Town of Polo, Bulacan (1623–1899) ===
- 1623 Juan Monsod
- 1624 Vicente de Guzman
- 1625 Pedro de Mendoza
- 1626 Tomas Hilot
- 1627 Juan Tolentino
- 1628 Juan Bili
- 1629 Juan Tibay Mendoza
- 1630 Juan Mayao
- 1631 Sebastian Anahan
- 1633 Juan Gahamat
- 1634 Tomas Salamat
- 1635 Juan Mayao
- 1636 Francisco Preso
- 1637 Pablo Carilap
- 1638 Mateo Panolot
- 1639 Juan Buyot
- 1640 Sebastian Nisay
- 1641 Pedro Mananquil
- 1642 Juan Lonis
- 1643 Francisco de Guia
- 1644 Pedro Mananquil
- 1645 Juan Mayao
- 1646 Mateo Panolot
- 1647 Pablo Mangayat
- 1648 Bartolome Guimbal
- 1649 Pedro Mendoza
- 1650 Tomas Palad
- 1651 Francisco de Guia
- 1652 Alonso Guimbal
- 1653 Anastacio Mendiola
- 1654 Lazaro Palad
- 1655 Juan Rivera
- 1656 Diego Liwanag
- 1657 Esteban Rodriguez
- 1658 Pedro del Castillo
- 1659 Diego dela Cruz
- 1660 Francisco Aquino
- 1661 Juan Monrada
- 1662 Sebastian Anahan
- 1663 Gabriel Daisig
- 1664–1665 Diego dela Cruz
- 1666 Bartolome Cabayag
- 1667 Diego dela Cruz
- 1668 Miguel Luian
- 1669 Pedro Alcantara
- 1670 Juan Ventura
- 1671 Andres Constreras
- 1672 Antonio Taba
- 1673 Antonio Alvarez
- 1674 Francisco Gutierrez
- 1675 Diego Roxas
- 1676 Juan Urbano
- 1677 Juan de Castro
- 1678 Ignacio Roman
- 1679 Juan Clave
- 1680 Francisco dela Cruz
- 1681 Juan Bautista
- 1682 Pedro Mendoza
- 1683 Geronimo dela Cruz
- 1684 Francisco Salvador
- 1685 Pablo Manquela
- 1686 Juan Pasardo
- 1687 Diego Yoren
- 1688 Antonio Taba
- 1689 Francisco Sacdalan
- 1690 Francisco Perez
- 1691 Agustin Gatchalian
- 1692 Juan Bunag
- 1693 Jose Casimiro
- 1694 Francisco Alcala
- 1695 Jose Madlangaway
- 1696 Juan Martin
- 1697 Lucas Santiago
- 1698 Tomas Pasco
- 1699 Bernardino Pasawa
- 1700 Pedro Suarez
- 1701 Diego Herrera
- 1702 Juan dela Cruz
- 1703 Juan Langon
- 1704 Jose Capuli
- 1705 Diego Ramirez
- 1706 Bernardino Pascual
- 1707 Bartolome Panotol
- 1708 Francisco Gingan
- 1709 Bartolome Pangan
- 1710 Juan Roque
- 1711 Francisco Garcia
- 1712 Francisco Alcala
- 1713 Gaspar de Acuna
- 1714 Diego Magbanta
- 1715 Geronimo Pascual
- 1716 Miguel Marcos
- 1717 Jose Velis
- 1718 Pedro Mendoza
- 1719 Francisco Guinao
- 1720 Antonio Fernandez
- 1721 Ventura Contreras
- 1722 Manuel Bunag
- 1723 Luis Lazaro
- 1724 Bartolome Panotol
- 1725 Manuel de Silva
- 1726 Bernardo de Rosa
- 1727–1731 Francisco Roque Quinao
- 1732 Juan dela Cruz Oque
- 1732 Mateo dela Cruz
- 1733–1734 Francisco Bautista
- 1735 Francisco Roque
- 1736 Enrique Alcantara
- 1737 Francisco Roque Palo
- 1738 Miguel Tercias Perez
- 1739 Miguel Alarcon
- 1740 Francisco Roque Palo
- 1741 Pedro de Mendoza
- 1743 Juan Martin y Zuniga
- 1744 Pedro de Alvaro
- 1745 Pedro Catabas
- 1746 Sebastian Capiral
- 1747 Juan Marcos
- 1748 Martin de San Diego
- 1749 Enrique Alcantara
- 1750 Miguel Tercias Perez
- 1751 Juan Martin y Zuniga
- 1752 F. D. Bunag
- 1753 C. Mercado
- 1754 Juan Serrano
- 1755 Juan Catabas
- 1756 Bartolome Fajardo
- 1757 Felipe dela Cruz
- 1758 Esteban Marcelo
- 1759 P. Catabas
- 1760 J. R. Bautista
- 1761 P. Alejandrino
- 1762 Juan Roque
- 1763 F. Estevar
- 1764 Francisco Villegas
- 1765 Juan Bautista de Rivera
- 1766 Martin Santiago
- 1767 Domingo dela Cruz
- 1768 Diego Francisco de Padua
- 1769 Tomas del Rosario
- 1770 Geronimo Acuna
- 1771 Pedro dela Cruz
- 1772 Andres Danganang
- 1773 Mateo delos Reyes
- 1774 P. Pascual de Avila
- 1775 Francisco Madlangaway
- 1776 Pascual Climaco
- 1777 F. dela Cruz Pascual
- 1778 Martin Paulino
- 1779 M. Guillermo dela Cruz
- 1780 Alejo Pascual Ramos
- 1782 Pascual Pacheco
- 1783 Juan Serrano
- 1784 Juan Bernabe
- 1785 Martin Santiago
- 1786 Juan Cabral
- 1787 Domingo Serrano
- 1788 Francisco Andres Climaco
- 1789 Diego Mejia
- 1790 Lucas Bernabe
- 1791 Ignacio Acuna
- 1792 Miguel Antonio dela Cruz
- 1793 Pascual Clemente
- 1794 Faustino Bernardino
- 1795 Antonio Bautista
- 1796 Andres Ramirez
- 1797 Alejo Pascual Ramos
- 1798 Joaquin delos Santos
- 1799 Francisco Domingo
- 1800 Mariano Serbante
- 1801 Juan Pascual
- 1802 Agustin Aquino
- 1803 Francisco Domingo
- 1804 Francisco Ambrosio Valenzuela
- 1805 Pedro Juan Mendoza
- 1806 Tomas Santiago
- 1807 Pascual Inocencio
- 1808 Manuel Martin
- 1809 Fulgencio Ramos
- 1810 Francisco Ambrosio Valenzuela
- 1811 Lorenzo Lazaro
- 1812 Lorenzo Diego Mendoza
- 1813 Sebastian Salazar
- 1814 Pedro Biglang-awa
- 1815 Miguel de San Diego
- 1816 Jose Faustino Ramos
- 1817 Manuel Guillermo dela Cruz
- 1818 Pascual dela Cruz Andaya
- 1819 Basilio delos Santos
- 1820 Lucas Marcelo
- 1821 Manuel Hernandez
- 1822 Andres Salazar
- 1823 Manuel Hernandez
- 1824 Esteban del Rosario
- 1825 Pascual Faustino
- 1826 Joaquin dela Cruz
- 1827 Fernando Francisco
- 1828 Felipe Santiago
- 1829 Pascual Faustino
- 1830 Pedro del Castillo
- 1831 Manuel Hernandez
- 1832 Agustin Ramirez
- 1837 Olegario Bautista
- 1838 Alonso Bartolome
- 1839 Cayetano Domingo
- 1841 Tomas Ramos
- 1842 Antonio Salvador
- 1843 Francisco de San Diego
- 1844 Francisco Altuveros
- 1845 Andres Salazar
- 1846 Roman dela Cruz
- 1847 Eusebio Valenzuela
- 1848 Eulogio Valenzuela
- 1849 Domingo Mendoza
- 1850 Domingo Trinidad
- 1851 Marcelino Ignacio
- 1852 Honorio Bartolome
- 1853 Teodoro Hernandez
- 1855 Geronimo Narciso
- 1856 Andres Disay de San Gabriel
- 1857 Severino Decano Bernardo
- 1858 Mariano Velilla de Jesus
- 1859 Carlos Valenzuela
- 1860 Antonio Claro dela Cruz
- 1861 Estanislao de San Diego
- 1862 Feliciano Rivera de Vera
- 1863 Juan Trinidad
- 1864 Marcelino Capalad
- 1865–1867 Mariano Velilla de Jesus
- 1867–1869 Antonio Declaro
- 1869–1871 Francisco Paez
- 1871–1873 Francisco Valenzuela
- 1873–1875 Anselmo Valenzuela
- 1875–1877 Patricio Lazaro
- 1877–1879 Damian Decano
- 1879–1881 Valentin Herrera
- 1881–1883 Francisco Valenzuela
- 1883–1885 Julio Paez
- 1885–1887 Francisco Valenzuela
- 1887–1889 Santos de Castro
- 1889–1890 Ireneo de Castro
- 1890–1892 Nemecio Santiago
- 1892–1897 Ireneo de Castro
- 1897–1898 Nemecio Santiago
- 1898 Mariano Velillia
- 1898–1899 Juan Macatulad
- 1899 Rufino Valenzuela

=== Municipality of Polo, Bulacan (1899–1960) ===
	Name	From	To	Party	Notes
1	Pío Valenzuela y Alejandrino	September 6, 1899	1901		Member of the Katipunan triumvirate. First mayor of Polo. Appointed by the Americans as the municipal president (presidente municipal) of the town in 1899. Served as the 10th governor of Bulacan from 1921 to 1925.
2	Nemencio D. Santiago	1901	1903		
3	Rufino D. Valenzuela	1903	1907		First of two terms as mayor.
4	Inoc D. Guansing	1908	1909		
5	Melencio Hernandez	1910	1912		
6	José Serapio	1912	1917		Served as the 3rd governor of Bulacan from 1900 to 1901.
–	Fortunato Rivera	1917			Acting mayor
7	Rufino D. Valenzuela	1917	1919		Second of two terms as mayor.
8	Tomás de Castro	1920	1922		
9	Arcadío Deato	1922	1928		
10	Barcenico Espiritu	1928	1931		
11	Andres Fernando	1931	1937		First two of three terms as mayor.
12	Leopoldo Santiago	1937	1940		
13	Andres Fernando	1940	1942		Third of three terms as mayor.
14	Feliciano Ponciano	1942	1944		Replaced Fernando in 1942. Executed by the Japanese during the reign of terror of 1944.
15	Pedro de Guía	1944	1945		
16	Faustino Cruz y Dela Cruz	1945	1946		First Military Mayor. The prime mover in changing the name Municipality of Polo to Municipality of Valenzuela in honor of Dr. Pio Valenzuela in 1947 and later approved by President Carlos P. Garcia in 1960.
17	Florentino Deato	1946	December 31, 1951		First of two terms as mayor.
18	Avelino Deato	January 1, 1952	December 31, 1955		
19	Ignacio Santiago Sr.	January 1, 1956	December 31, 1959		First of two terms as mayor, last mayor of a unified Polo.

=== Division (1960–1963) ===
==== Municipality of Polo, Bulacan ====
	Name	From	To	Party	Notes
20	Florentino Deato	January 1, 1960	December 31, 1963		Only mayor of Polo; second of two terms as mayor.

==== Municipality of Valenzuela, Bulacan ====
	Name	From	To	Party	Notes
–	Enrique Bautista	1960			First mayor of Valenzuela; appointed mayor
–	Pío Angeles	1960	1961		Appointed mayor
–	Gregorio Marcelo	1961	1962		Appointed mayor
–	Faustino Lazaro	1962	December 31, 1963		Last mayor of Valenzuela; appointed mayor

=== Municipality of Valenzuela (1964–1998) ===
	Name	From	To	Party	Vice Mayor	Notes
21	Ignacio Santiago Sr.	January 1, 1964	December 31, 1967	Nacionalista	Pio Angeles	Second of two terms as mayor; mayor of the reunified municipality of Valenzuela; served as the 15th governor of Bulacan from 1968 to 1986.
22	Geronimo S. Angeles	January 1, 1968	February 25, 1986	Nacionalista (until 1978); KBL (from 1978)	Felipe Pasco (1968–1971); Isidoro Arenas (1972–1986)	Longest-serving mayor; from Third Republic up to the Martial Law era and integration of Valenzuela to Metropolitan Manila Commission in 1975. The Finance Center Building of the city, Bulwagang Geronimo Angeles (Geronimo Angeles Hall) was named after him.
–	Wilfredo F. Chongco	February 26, 1986	1987	PDP–Laban		Appointed mayor by President Corazon Aquino
–	Artemio P. Andres	1988				Acting mayor.
–	Linda Tantay Santos	1988				Acting mayor.
–	Romeo Llenado	1988				Acting mayor.
23	Santiago A. de Guzman	June 30, 1988	June 30, 1995	Nacionalista (until 1991); NPC (from 1991)	Jose Emmanuel L. Carlos (1992–1995)	
24	Jose Emmanuel L. Carlos	June 30, 1995	December 30, 1998	Lakas–CMD	Evelyn Hernandez (1995–1998); Ernesto de Guzman (1998)	Term extended until the cityhood of Valenzuela.

=== City of Valenzuela (since 1998) ===
	Image	Name	From	To	Election	Party	Vice Mayor
24		Jose Emmanuel L. Carlos	December 30, 1998	June 30, 2004	1998	Lakas	Ernesto P. De Guzman
24		Jose Emmanuel L. Carlos	December 30, 1998	June 30, 2004	2001	Lakas	Antonio R. Espiritu
25		Sherwin T. Gatchalian	June 30, 2004	June 30, 2013	2004	NPC	Antonio R. Espiritu
25		Sherwin T. Gatchalian	June 30, 2004	June 30, 2013	2007	NPC	Eric M. Martinez
25		Sherwin T. Gatchalian	June 30, 2004	June 30, 2013	2010	NPC	Eric M. Martinez
26		Rexlon T. Gatchalian	June 30, 2013	June 30, 2022	2013	NPC	Eric M. Martinez
26		Rexlon T. Gatchalian	June 30, 2013	June 30, 2022	2016	NPC	Lorena C. Natividad-Borja
26		Rexlon T. Gatchalian	June 30, 2013	June 30, 2022	2019	NPC	Lorena C. Natividad-Borja
27		Weslie T. Gatchalian	June 30, 2022	Present	2022	NPC	Lorena C. Natividad-Borja
27		Weslie T. Gatchalian	June 30, 2022	Present	2025	NPC	Marlon Paulo D. Alejandrino

== See also ==
- Mayor of Manila
