= 2001 Valenzuela local elections =

Local elections in Valenzuela, Philippines

2001 Valenzuela mayoral election
- May 14, 2001
Nominee	Jose Emmanuel "Bobbit" L. Carlos	Ernesto "Boy" De Guzman
Party	Lakas	NPC
Running mate		Antonio "Tony" Espiritu
Popular vote	76,176	49,768 (Note: Pilipino Star Ngayon reported 49,784 votes for De Guzman, while the English-language The Philippine Star reported 49,768.)
Mayor before election
Jose Emmanuel "Bobbit" L. Carlos
Lakas
Elected mayor
Jose Emmanuel "Bobbit" L. Carlos
Lakas

Local elections were held in Valenzuela on May 14, 2001, as part of the 2001 Philippine general election. Voters elected the mayor, vice mayor, two representatives to the House of Representatives of the Philippines and 12 regular members of the Valenzuela City Council, with six councilors representing each of the city's two legislative districts.

Incumbent mayor Jose Emmanuel "Bobbit" L. Carlos was reelected. Antonio "Tony" R. Espiritu won the vice mayoralty, while Sherwin "Win" T. Gatchalian and Magtanggol "Magi" T. Gunigundo I were elected to represent the first and second congressional districts, respectively.

== Background ==
The city charter enacted in 1998 provided for the creation of at least two legislative districts corresponding to Valenzuela's two existing council districts. The districts were to commence with the first national election held after 1998, making 2001 the first election in which Valenzuela elected two district representatives.

A contemporary report stated that Valenzuela had 229,212 registered voters and 1,189 polling precincts.

== Results ==
=== Mayor ===
Incumbent mayor Jose Emmanuel "Bobbit" L. Carlos was proclaimed reelected with 76,176 votes. Former vice mayor Ernesto "Boy" P. De Guzman, his nearest rival, received 49,768 votes according to the English-language report in The Philippine Star. The University of the Philippines Center for Integrative and Development Studies election dataset records Carlos as a candidate of Lakas–NUCD–UMDP and gives the same vote total.

2001 Valenzuela mayoral election
Candidate	Party	Votes
Jose Emmanuel "Bobbit" L. Carlos	Lakas–NUCD–UMDP	76,176
Ernesto "Boy" P. De Guzman	Nationalist People's Coalition	49,768 (Note: The English-language report gave De Guzman's total as 49,768. A contemporaneous Filipino-language report gave him 49,784 votes, a difference of 16 votes.)
Eliseo T. Dimafelis	Lakas–NUCD–UMDP	

=== Vice mayor ===
Antonio "Tony" R. Espiritu won the vice mayoralty with a reported 68,784 votes. Contemporary published reports consulted for this article did not give a complete vice-mayoral tally.

2001 Valenzuela vice mayoral election
Candidate	Party	Votes
Antonio "Tony" R. Espiritu	Nationalist People's Coalition	68,784
Irineo D. Candido	Kabalikat ng Malayang Pilipino	
Pablo H. Lucas	Lakas–NUCD–UMDP	

=== House of Representatives ===
The city election officer proclaimed Sherwin Gatchalian and Magtanggol Gunigundo winners in Valenzuela's two congressional districts.

District	Elected representative	Result
First district	Sherwin "Win" T. Gatchalian	Elected
Second district	Magtanggol "Magi" T. Gunigundo I	Reelected

In the first district, Gatchalian defeated a field that included former Presidential Commission on Good Government chair Magtanggol C. Gunigundo and former city councilor Antonio M. Dalag. In the second district, incumbent representative Gunigundo faced former representative Antonio M. Serapio. Published reports consulted for this article did not provide complete final vote totals for either congressional contest.

=== City Council ===
A November 2001 city resolution recorded the following 12 regular councilors in office following the election. The two ex officio members of the council—the presidents of the city chapters of the Liga ng mga Barangay and the Sangguniang Kabataan federation—are not included because they were not elected as regular councilors in this election.

District	Councilors seated following the election
First district	Romeo P. Bularan; Elizabeth A. Chongco; Corazon A. Cortez; Reynaldo S. Cuadra; Marcelino G. Morelos; Ignacio G. Santiago Jr.
Second district	Rosalie S. Esteban; Ma. Cecilia V. Mayo; Lorena C. Natividad; Eric M. Martinez; Pablo D. Marcelo; Carlitos B. Tiquia
