= Manggahan High School =

- Mataas na Paaralan ng Manggahan

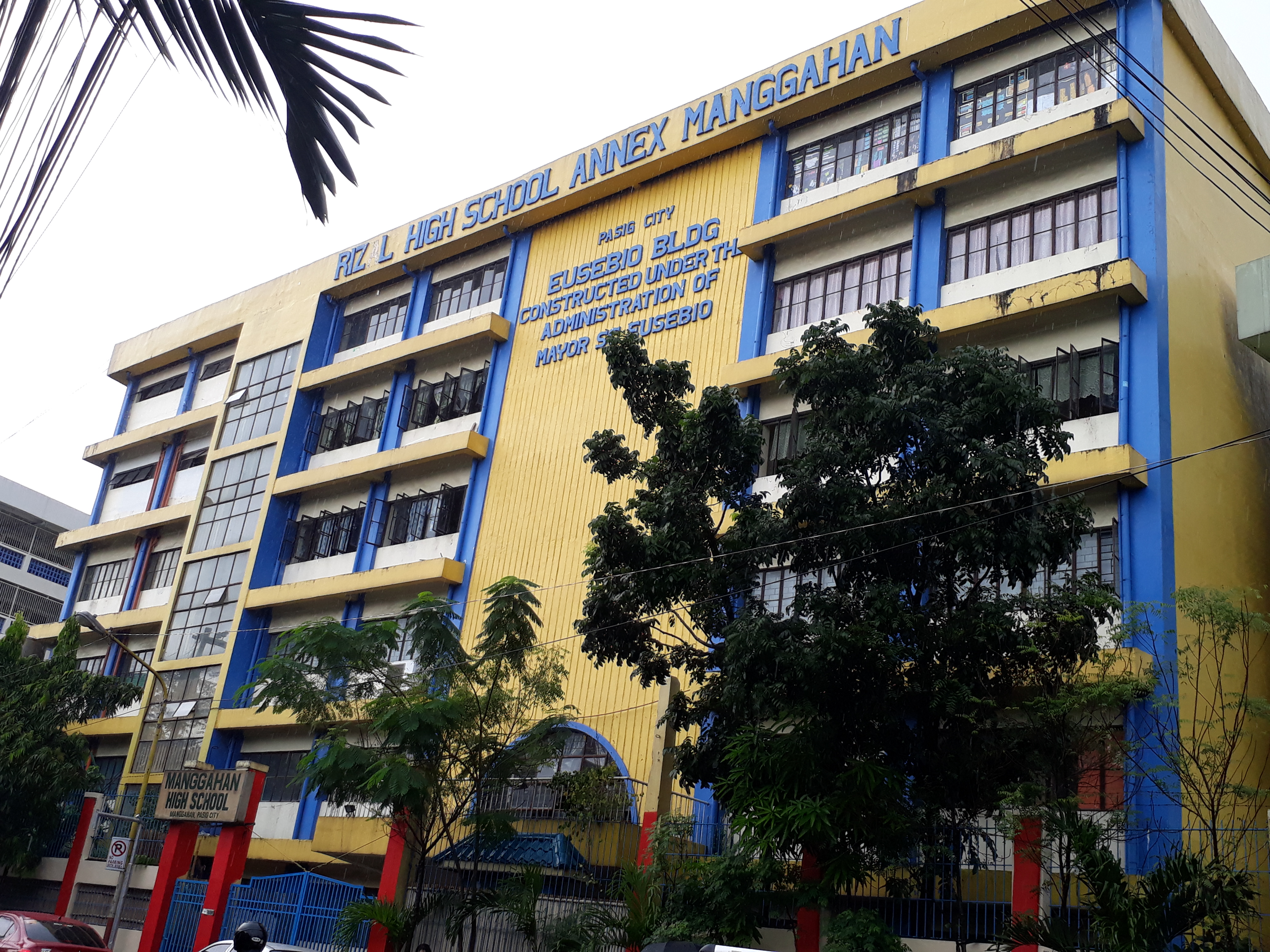
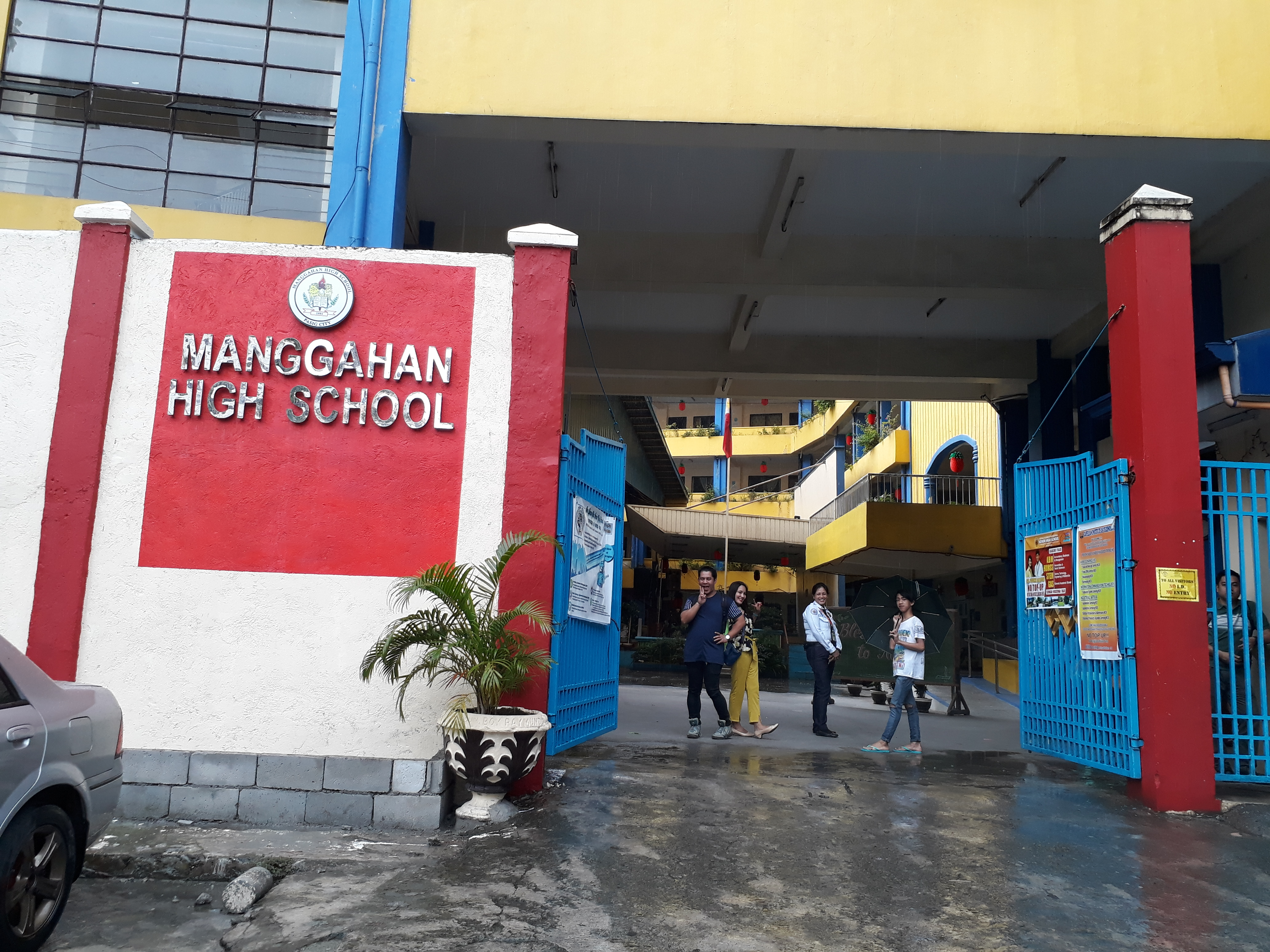

Location
- 44 Kaginhawaan Street, Karangalan Village, Brgy. Manggahan; Pasig, Metro Manila 1611
- Coordinates: 14°36′16.2″N 121°06′11.5″E

Information
- School type: Public high school
- Motto: Mind; Heart; Skills
- Established: January 1999 (Under Rizal High School)
- School district: Division of Pasig
- Educational authority: Department of Education
- School code: 340655
- Principal: Nenet M. Peñaranda
- Department heads: See details
- Key people: Mrs. Nancy J. Tolentino (Head teacher-in-charge of Rizal High School Annex Manggahan and 1st Principal of Manggahan High School)
- Enrolment: 4863 (S.Y. 2015-2016)
  - Grade 7: 1266
  - Grade 8: 1365
  - Grade 9: 1152
  - Grade 10: 1080
- Language: English and Filipino
- Newspaper: Le Graine
- Guidance counselor: Erlinda Josefina Zuñiga
- Last updated: 2018

Manggahan High School (abbreviated as MHS; Filipino: Mataas na Paaralan ng Manggahan), formerly known as Rizal High School Annex-Manggahan and mistakenly known as Manggahan National High School, is a public high school in Karangalan Village, Brgy. Manggahan, Pasig.

== History ==
=== ANRRENN ===
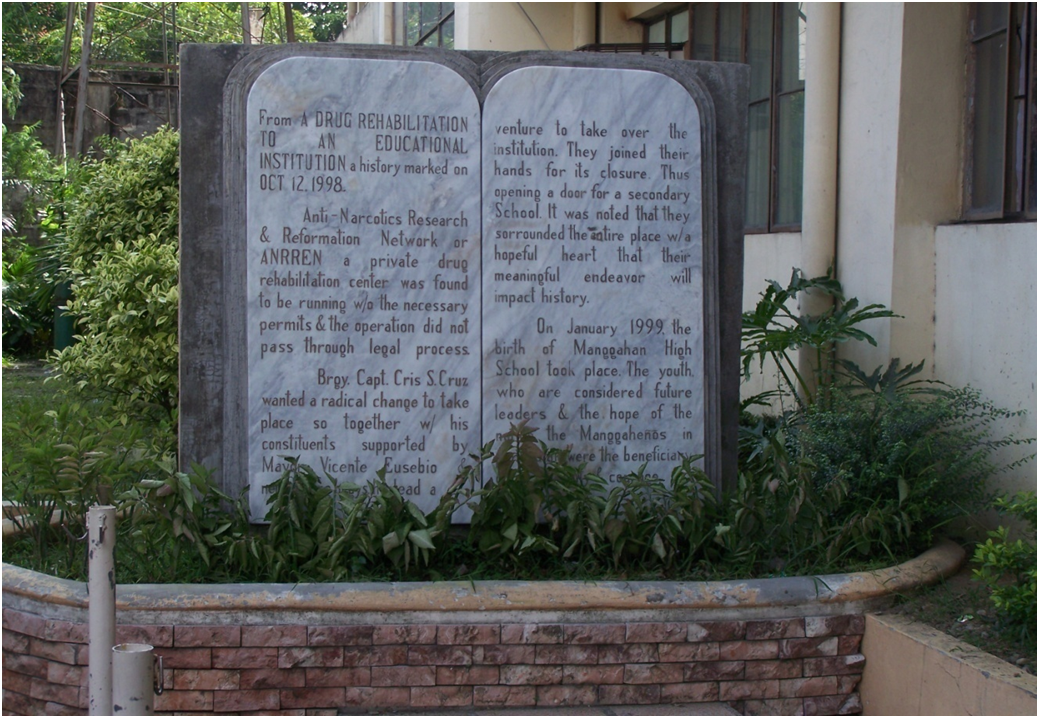
A historical marker in the school

The site of Manggahan High School was once a private drug rehabilitation center called Anti-Narcotics Research and Reformation Network (ANRRENN). It was reported that the center was operating illegally and the National Housing Authority (Philippines) owned the lot. Because of these complaints, the operation of the center stopped and the NHA donated the lot to the city government of Pasig.

=== S.Y. 1999-2000 of RHS Annex-Manggahan ===
The first building (present-day V.P.E. I Building) was constructed in 1998 under the administration of Mayor Vicente P. Eusebio and inaugurated on May 29, 1999 by Rev. Fr. Jorge Jesus Bellosillo of Immaculate Conception Quasi-Parish (present-day Immaculate Conception Parish). Rizal High School Annex-Manggahan started to operate with Mrs. Nancy J. Tolentino as Head Teacher-in-charge.

There were 430 first year and 210 second year, a total of 640 initial numbers of students who enrolled with 21 teachers. At the start of classes, the rooms were bare, no school decks, no blackboards. Some students brought their own stool for them not to squat on the floor. The needs of teachers and students were aired on television and printed on newspapers; thus, for the Department of Education, Culture, and Sports to provide the basic classroom facilities.

=== S.Y. 2000-2001 of RHSAM ===
Additional chairs and tables were received. Facilities and equipment were improved. Computers were forwarded through the initiative of Councilor Robert Eusebio (later became mayor). The office of the administrator was air-conditioned.
The third year level was opened in S.Y. 2000-2001. By then, student population reached 1,033. As the student populace kept growing, there was a need for additional classrooms.

=== S.Y. 2001-2002 of RHSAM ===
In the year 2001, two new buildings, the SCE Building I and DPWH Building were constructed. This was the time when fourth year class was organized. The first batch of graduates received their diplomas. The commencement exercises were held at Rizal High School main campus with the graduates of other annexes.

=== S.Y. 2002-2003 of RHSAM ===
The construction of SCE II was started before the school year ends. The second commencement exercise was held at the school ground. It was the first commencement exercises outside the main campus. That year also marks the first valedictorian of the school.

=== S.Y. 2003-2004 of RHSAM ===
The school year 2003-2004 started with the inauguration of SCE II under the administration of Mayor Soledad EusebIo. The enrollment increased from 2,003 to 2,288 students and forms 61 to 80 teachers. To cope up with the growing number of enrollees each year, DPWH Building was constructed into SCE III, which was a 6-storey building.

=== Foundation Day ===
Upon the recommendation of the Rizal High School principal, Josephine M. Cruz, and compliance with DepEd Order No. 71, s. 2003, which is titled "Transfer of Delegated Authority from the Office of the Secretary to the Regional Offices Regarding Approval of the Establishment, Separation of Annexes, Integration, Conversion and Renaming of Public Elementary and Secondary Schools", RHS Manggahan Annex was separated from its mother school, Rizal High School on July 30, 2004. The exemplary performance, meritorious services rendered and selfless devotion as Head Teacher-in-charge of RHSAM, Mrs. Nancy J. Tolentino, named as the principal of Manggahan High School. The first year of operation as MHS was initiated by renovation And construction of the additional rooms of fifth floor of VPE I building. The 437 graduates of Manggahan High School were led by Jessica V. Lacson.

=== After 10 years of Foundation ===
BCE I, named after Hon. Mayor Bobby Eusebio, was inaugurated on June 16, 2014 with a program, where Incumbent Mayor Maribel Eusebio and Former Mayor Bobby Eusebio attended. The decade foundation week started on June 27, 2014 with a fun run called "Dekada Run Para sa Mataas na Paaralan ng Manggahan", where the students, alumni of MHS and former RHSAM, and parents joined and proceeds will be for the improvement of the school. The "Mr. and Ms. MHS Competition 2014" and Flashback Fri-dance were also a part of the decade foundation celebration. The main program of the decade foundation celebration and alumni homecoming were on August 1, 2014. Many booths were organized for students. The theme for decade foundation celebration is "MHS Moving Towards Perfect Ten". In November 2014, The CCTV cameras of the school were installed.

A six storey with 15 classrooms Robert "Bobby" Cruz Eusebio Type School Building and a clinic at Kaginhawan street was inaugurated by Vico Sotto on May 2, 2022. The High School in Phase II B1 Karangalan Village Homeowners Association, a Rizal High School Annex underwent P 3.68 million repair and renovation from the General Fund.

== Gallery ==
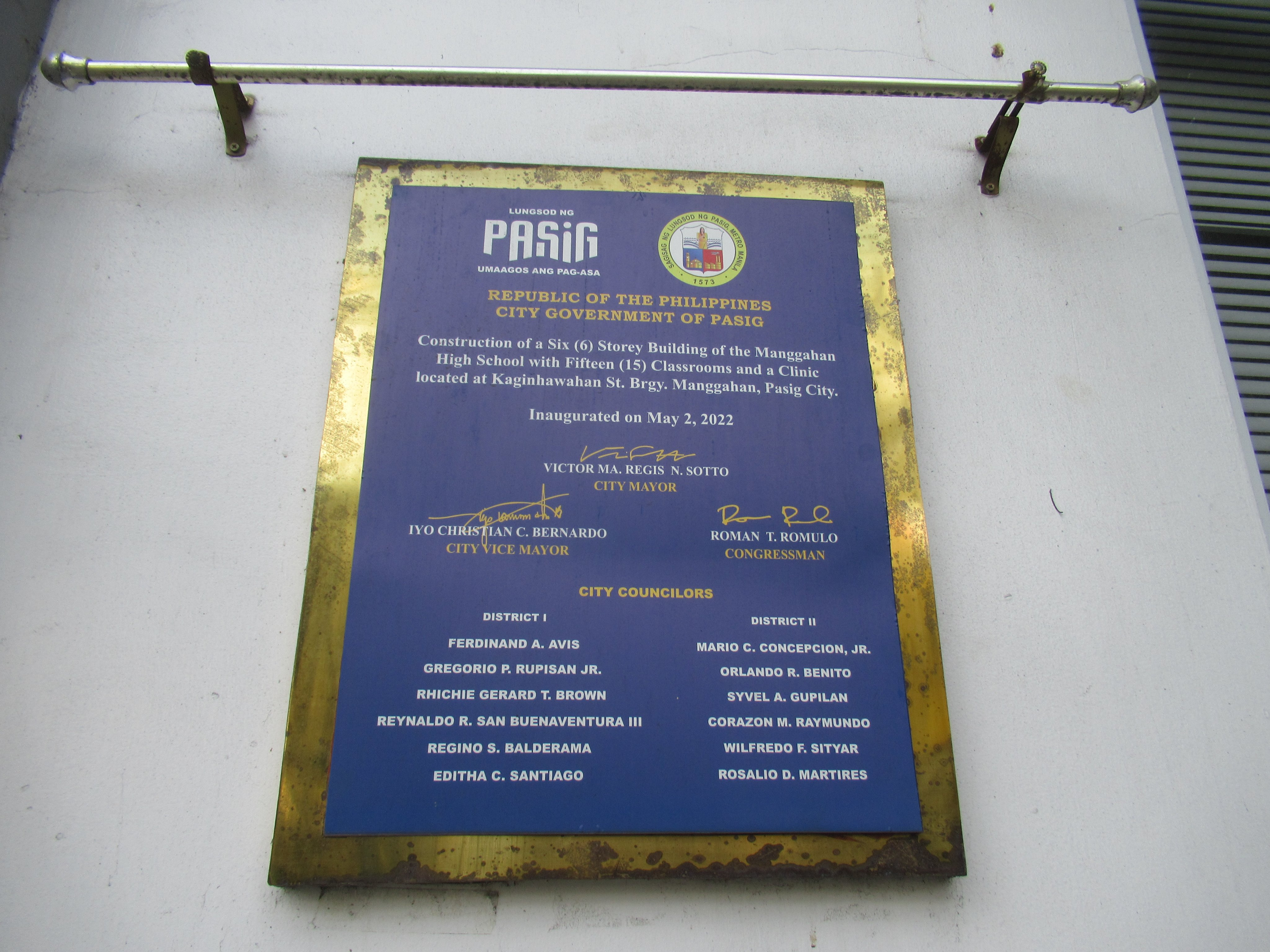
Historical marker, 2022

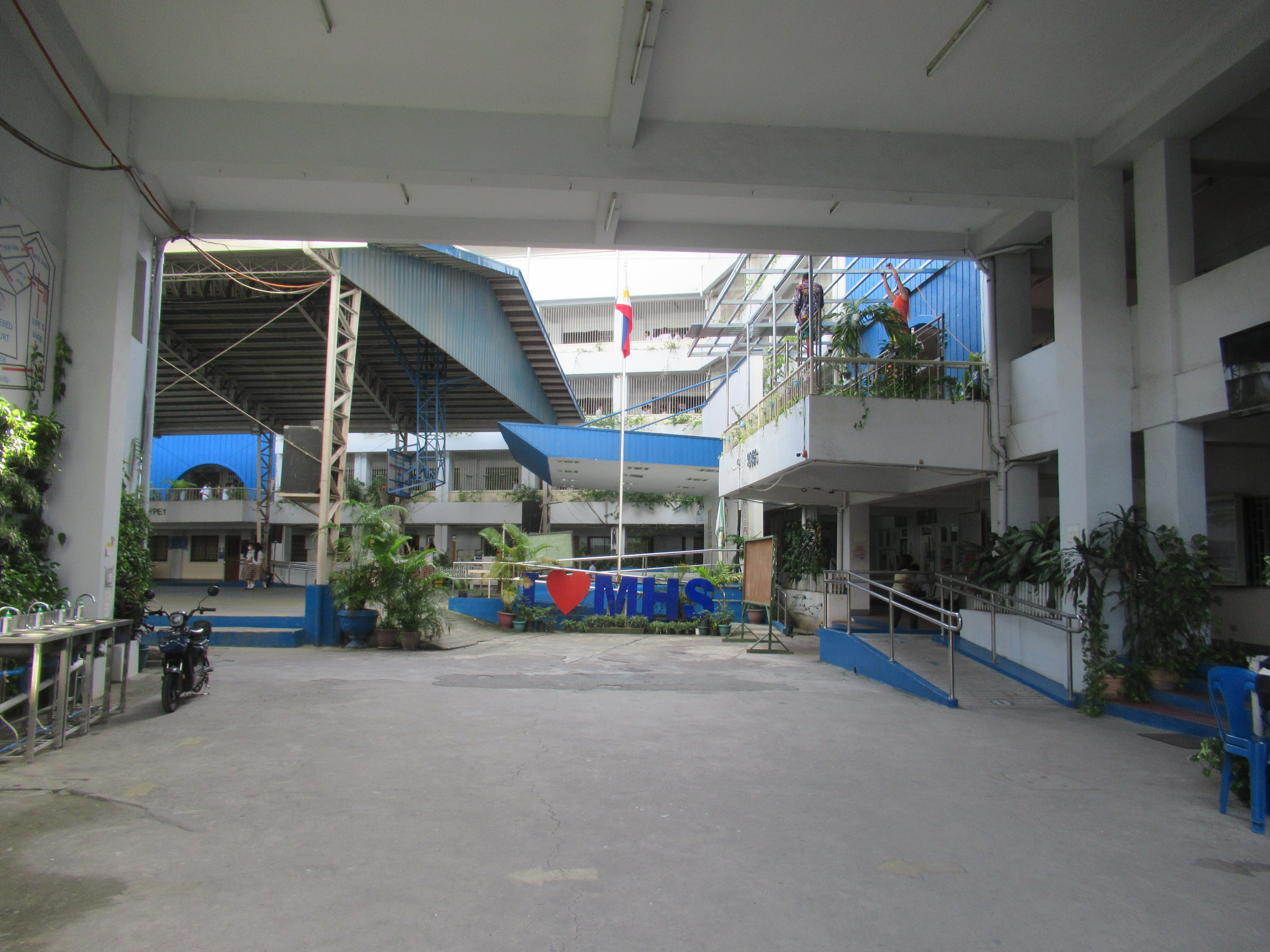
Phase II B1 Karangalan Village gate

== School Hymn ==
"Manggahan Hymn"
Official Tagalog lyrics

Mahal naming paaralan,
Kami ay nagpupugay,
Mga puso'y inaalay,
Paggalang at Pagmamahal.

Pagbabago'y naganap sa aming buhay,
Kaalama'y ibinigay,
Pagtuturo't paghuhubog sa tuwina,
Lahat alay sa'yo.

KORO:

Manggahan, aming paaralan,
Mahal naming Alma Mater,
Manggahan, aming paaralan,
Mahal naming Alma Mater.

Sa tulong ng Maykapal,
Ngalan mo'y itatanghal,
Habang nabubuhay,
Di ka namin malilimutan.

Pagbabago'y naganap sa aming buhay,
Kaalama'y ibinigay,
Pagtuturo't paghuhubog sa tuwina,
Lahat alay sa'yo.

KORO:

Manggahan, aming paaralan,
Mahal naming Alma Mater,
Manggahan, aming paaralan,
Mahal naming Alma Mater,

Mahal naming Alma Mater.

== Department heads ==
Head	Department
Imelda T. Tuaño	Filipino
Zenaida Q. Aclan	English
Cecilia M. Marcelo	Mathematics
Eleanor V. de Roja	Science
Lerma L. Villamarin	Araling Panlipunan (Social Studies)
Jerwina V. See	Technology and Livelihood Education
Leah S. Pilipiña	Music, Arts, Physical Education, and Health
Vivien F. Vinluan	Edukasyon sa Pagpapakatao (Values education)

== Skyline ==
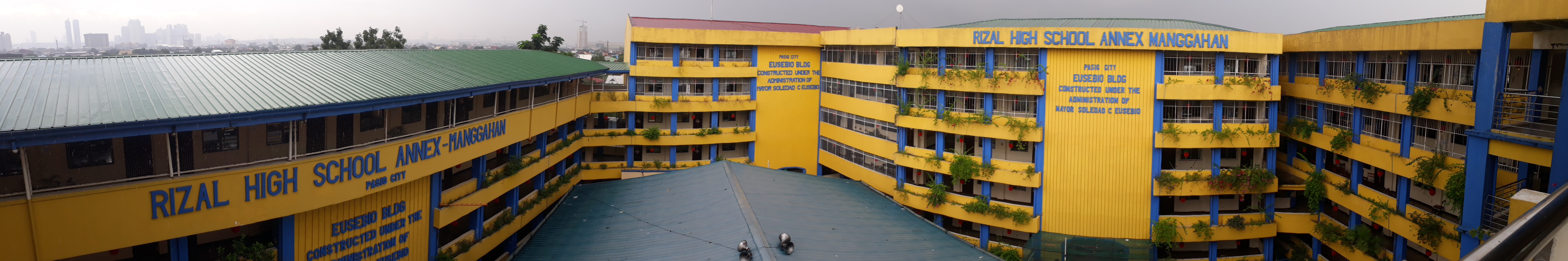
Panoramic skyline view of Manggahan High School, shot from VPE 2 Building (2016)
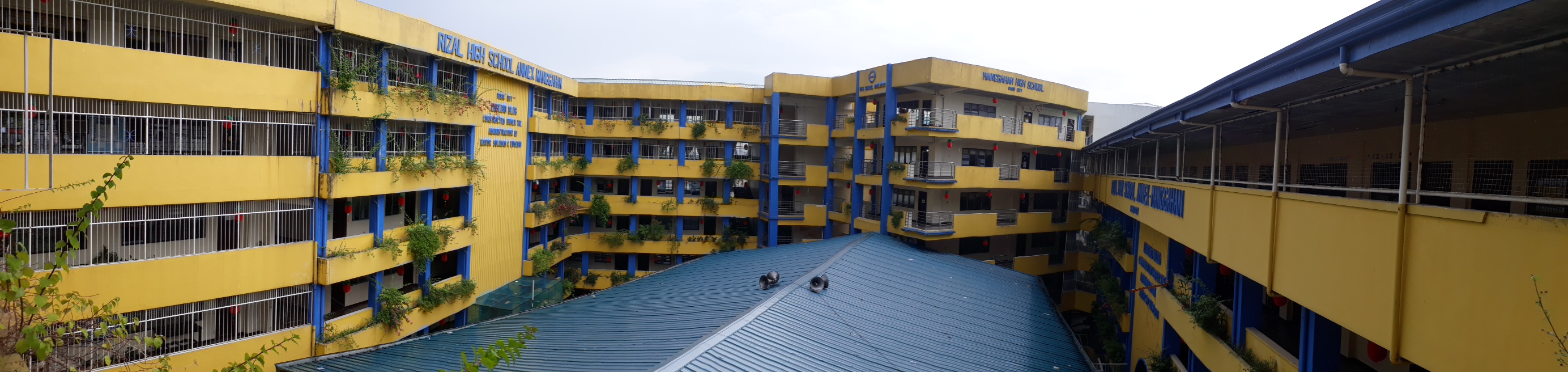
Panoramic skyline view of Manggahan High School, shot from SCE 3 Building (2016)

== Notable alumni ==
- Gabb Skribikin, member of MNL48
