= 1998 Valenzuela local elections =

1998 local elections in Valenzuela, Metro Manila

1998 Valenzuela mayoral election
- May 11, 1998
Candidate	Jose Emmanuel "Bobbit" L. Carlos	Antonio Serapio
Party	Lakas	LAMMP
Popular vote	102,668	77,270
Percentage	57.06	42.93
Mayor before election
Jose Emmanuel "Bobbit" L. Carlos
Lakas
Elected mayor
Jose Emmanuel "Bobbit" L. Carlos
Lakas

Local elections were held in the municipality of Valenzuela, Metro Manila, on May 11, 1998, as part of the 1998 Philippine general election. Voters elected a mayor, a vice mayor, twelve regular members of the municipal council, and a representative for Valenzuela's at-large congressional district. Incumbent mayor Jose Emmanuel "Bobbit" L. Carlos was proclaimed the winner of the mayoral election over outgoing representative Antonio M. Serapio.

Although the law converting Valenzuela into a highly urbanized city had been approved on February 14, 1998, the locality remained a municipality on election day because the conversion required ratification in a plebiscite. The charter was ratified on December 30, 1998, after which the officials elected in May continued in office as city officials.

== Background ==
Carlos had served as mayor since 1995 and sought a second term in 1998. Serapio, the outgoing representative of Valenzuela's at-large congressional district, challenged him for the mayoralty.

On February 14, 1998, President Fidel V. Ramos approved Republic Act No. 8526, the charter converting Valenzuela into a highly urbanized city. Under the charter, the city would acquire corporate existence only upon ratification by local voters, and incumbent municipal officials would continue in office following ratification until their successors were elected and qualified.

== Electoral system ==
Under the Local Government Code of 1991, the mayor and vice mayor were elected separately at large, while regular members of the local council were elected by district. The vice mayor served as the council's presiding officer. Valenzuela had twelve regular council seats. Beginning with the 1995 elections, council members in Metro Manila municipalities were elected from districts rather than at large; Valenzuela had two such councilor districts.

Valenzuela also elected one member of the House of Representatives from its at-large district. The two congressional districts created by the city charter were to be used beginning with the next national election after the conversion.

== Results ==
=== Mayor ===
The Municipal Board of Canvassers proclaimed Carlos on May 21, 1998.

1998 Valenzuela mayoral election
Candidate	Party	Votes	%
Jose Emmanuel "Bobbit" L. Carlos (incumbent)	Lakas–NUCD–UMDP	102,688	57.06
Antonio Serapio	Laban ng Makabayang Masang Pilipino	77,270	42.93
Ramon Ignacio	Kilusang Bagong Lipunan	20	0.01
Total		179,978	100.00
Lakas–NUCD–UMDP hold			
Source: Commission on Elections

The figures above follow the itemized canvass reproduced in the Supreme Court's decision in Carlos v. Angeles. An earlier passage in the same decision states that Carlos was proclaimed with 102,688 votes, twenty more than the itemized figure. The decision also gives a margin of 25,418 votes, which corresponds to the earlier figure. Because the decision contains this internal discrepancy, percentages and a total are not shown.

=== Vice mayor ===
Ernesto "Boy" P. De Guzman served as vice mayor and presiding officer of the council during the term that followed the election.

1998 Valenzuela vice mayoral election
Candidate	Party	Votes	%
Ernesto "Boy" de Guzman	Laban ng Makabayang Masang Pilipino	72,055	43.73
Wilfredo Chongco	Lakas–NUCD–UMDP	67,965	41.25
Ernesto Carabeo	Liberal Party	24,743	15.02
Total		164,763	100.00
Laban ng Makabayang Masang Pilipino gain from Lakas–NUCD–UMDP			
Source: Commission on Elections

=== House of Representatives ===
Magtanggol "Magi" Gunigundo I succeeded Serapio as the representative of Valenzuela's at-large district in the 11th Congress.

1998 Valenzuela Lone District Representative election
Candidate	Party	Votes	%
Magtanggol "Magi" Gunigundo I	Lakas–NUCD–UMDP	56,078	33.26
Evelyn "Jing" Hernandez	Liberal Party	53,425	31.69
Santiago "Santy" de Guzman	Laban ng Makabayang Masang Pilipino	34,266	20.33
Eduardo "Eddie" Franco	Partido para sa Demokratikong Reporma	23,387	13.87
Jesus Mendoza	Independent	1,431	0.85
Total		168,587	100.00
Lakas–NUCD–UMDP gain from Laban ng Makabayang Masang Pilipino			
Source: Commission on Elections

=== Municipal council ===
A city ordinance enacted during the term lists the following twelve regular council members:

Council member
Romeo P. Bularan
Corazon A. Cortez
Reynaldo S. Cuadra
Antonio M. Dalag
Erlinda S. Dela Cruz
Antonio R. Espiritu
Edilberto M. Lozada
Pablo D. Marcelo
Ma. Cecilia V. Mayo
Lorena C. Natividad
Fernando G. Padrinao
Isidro S. Valenzuela

The same ordinance identifies Roberto B. Darilag, president of the Liga ng mga Barangay, and Ritche D. Cuadra, president of the local Sangguniang Kabataan federation, as ex officio council members. Those positions were not filled by the May 1998 district council elections.

== Mayoral election protest ==
Serapio filed an election protest on June 1, 1998. A physical count conducted during the protest produced 103,551 votes for Carlos and 76,246 for Serapio. Following the revision of ballots, the trial court's final tally counted 83,609 valid votes for Carlos and 66,602 for Serapio, leaving Carlos ahead by 17,007 votes.

Despite that tally, the Regional Trial Court in Caloocan, acting on the protest after the Valenzuela judges inhibited themselves, ruled on April 24, 2000, that the election had been affected by fraud. It set aside Carlos's proclamation and declared Serapio the elected mayor. On May 8, the Supreme Court issued a temporary restraining order preventing implementation of the trial court ruling.

On November 29, 2000, the Supreme Court annulled the trial court's decision. It held that the trial court had gravely abused its discretion by declaring the second-placed candidate elected despite its own finding that Carlos had received more valid votes. The Court made its restraining order permanent and remanded the protest for a new decision within fifteen days.

== Transition to city government ==
Valenzuela's city charter was ratified in a plebiscite held on December 30, 1998. Under the charter's transitory provision, the municipal officials elected in May continued to exercise their functions as city officials. The charter also divided Valenzuela into two congressional districts beginning with the next national election, which was held in 2001.

== See also ==
- 1998 Philippine general election
- Legislative districts of Valenzuela
- Valenzuela City Council
