= Ignacio Santiago Sr. =

Filipino politician

Ignacio Santiago

Governor of Bulacan
- In office January 1, 1968 – March 23, 1986
- Vice Governor: Amado Pineda (1968–1971); Wilfrido Villarama (1972–1975); Vacant (1975–1980); Bernardo Ople (1980–1986)
- Preceded by: Jose Villarama
- Succeeded by: Roberto Pagdanganan

21st Mayor of Valenzuela, Bulacan
- In office January 1, 1964 – December 30, 1967
- Vice Mayor: Pio Angeles
- Preceded by: Faustino Lazaro
- Succeeded by: Geronimo S. Angeles
- In office January 1, 1956 – December 30, 1959
- Preceded by: Avelino Deato
- Succeeded by: Florentino Deato

Personal details
- Born: August 31, 1929 Polo, Bulacan, Philippine Islands
- Died: December 2, 2015 (aged 86) Valenzuela, Philippines
- Resting place: Polo Catholic Cemetery
- Party: Lakas (1991–2015)
- Other political affiliations: Nacionalista (until 1986)

Ignacio Serapio Santiago Sr. (August 31, 1929 – December 2, 2015) was the governor of Bulacan from 1968 to 1986. He previously served as the mayor of Polo from 1956 until 1959, and again from 1964 to 1967, after the town was renamed to Valenzuela.

Political offices
Preceded by Jose Villarama	Governor of Bulacan; 1968–1986	Succeeded by Amado Pineda; Interim
Preceded by Faustino Lazaro	Mayor of Valenzuela, Bulacan; 1964–1967	Succeeded by Geronimo S. Angeles
Preceded by Avelino Deato	Mayor of Polo, Bulacan; 1956–1959	Succeeded by Florentino Deato
