= Santa Rosa Catholic School =

Roman Catholic school in Pasig, Philippines

Sta. Rosa Catholic School

Location
- Pasig; Metro Manila; Philippines
- Coordinates: 14°34′0″N 121°4′16″E

Information
- Type: Private Catholic School
- Motto: "All for You my Jesus, All for You!" "Duc in Altum"
- Established: 1981
- Superintendent: Rev. Fr. Daniel L. Estacio
- Principal: Ms. Maria Lynette Mendoza
- Schedule: 7:00 - 2:00
- Campus: Urban
- Colors: Pink, Brown, Fuchsia Pink

Sta. Rosa Catholic School (SRCS) is a private Catholic school located in Pasig, Philippines.

== History ==
The school originated as the "Sta. Rosa de Lima Learning Center", founded in 1981-1982 by Monsignor Danilo J. Pascual, then Parish Priest of Sta. Rosa de Lima Parish and began in the converted church basement of Sta. Rosa de Lima Parish. The preschool was blessed on June 21, 1981 with Mr. and Mrs. Virgilio Melendres as its main sponsors, and St. Paul College, Pasig donating the furniture.

On April 20, 1985, a new two-room school building was blessed, through the efforts of the late Monsignor Isidro L. Jose, also a former parish priest and the donations of parishioners and friends. The learning center was renamed the "Sta. Rosa Parochial School" in 1988, with Mrs. Teresita Mateo appointed as the grade school coordinator. The building was then converted into a four-room school building through the initiative of the late Monsignor Jose and the school principal, Ms. Belen B. Ramos.

At a meeting of the Board of Trustees on August 7, 2001, the school was registered as "Sta Rosa Catholic School".
