= Bobbit Carlos =

Filipino politician

Jose Emmanuel L. Carlos
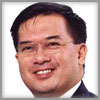

Member of the Philippine House of Representatives from Valenzuela's 1st district
- In office June 30, 2004 – June 30, 2007
- Preceded by: Win Gatchalian
- Succeeded by: Rex Gatchalian

24th Mayor of Valenzuela
- In office June 30, 1995 – June 30, 2004
- Vice Mayor: Evelyn Hernandez (1995–1998); Ernesto de Guzman (1998–2001); Antonio Espiritu (2001–2004)
- Preceded by: Santiago de Guzman
- Succeeded by: Win Gatchalian

Vice Mayor of Valenzuela
- In office June 30, 1992 – June 30, 1995
- Mayor: Santiago de Guzman
- Succeeded by: Evelyn Hernandez

Member of the Valenzuela Municipal Council
- In office June 30, 1988 – June 30, 1992

Personal details
- Born: December 25, 1957 (age 68) Polo, Bulacan, Philippines
- Party: LINKOD; Lakas–CMD; LDP
- Spouse: Margarita Cruz-Carlos
- Children: 1
- Education: University of Santo Tomas
- Profession: Physician

Jose Emmanuel "Bobbit" Lozada Carlos (born December 25, 1957), is a Filipino physician and politician who served as the representative of the first congressional district of Valenzuela to House of Representatives of the Philippines from 2004 to 2007. He also served as the city's councilor from 1998 to 1992, vice mayor from 1992 to 1995, and mayor from 1995 to 2004.

== Education ==
Carlos finished his elementary education at the Pio Valenzuela Elementary School in 1970 and his secondary education at St. Jude Academy in 1974. He obtained his Bachelor of Science (1978) and Doctor of Medicine (1982) degrees from the University of Santo Tomas.

== Career history ==
A medical doctor by profession, Carlos began his practice as an adjunct resident at the Department of Surgery of José R. Reyes Memorial Medical Center from 1984 to 1985, and then as a municipal physician at the Municipal Health Department of Valenzuela from 1985 to 1987. He also practiced at his mother's private clinic in Palasan.

His political career began in 1988. He served as a councilor (1988–1992), vice mayor (1992–1995), mayor (1995–2004), and finally as 1st District Representative (2004–2007) of Valenzuela City. In 2007, he ran in the mayoral election but was defeated by incumbent Mayor Sherwin Gatchalian.

== Personal life ==
Carlos is married to Margarita Cruz. They have one son, King.

Political offices
Preceded by unknown	Vice Mayor of Valenzuela; 1992-1995	Succeeded by Evelyn Hernandez
Preceded by Santiago de Guzman	Mayor of Valenzuela City; 1995-2004	Succeeded by Win Gatchalian
House of Representatives of the Philippines
Preceded by Win Gatchalian	Representative, 1st district of Valenzuela; 2004-2007	Succeeded by Rex Gatchalian
