= Rizal High School =

Coordinates: 14°34′05″N 121°04′32″E

- Mataas na Paaralang Rizal

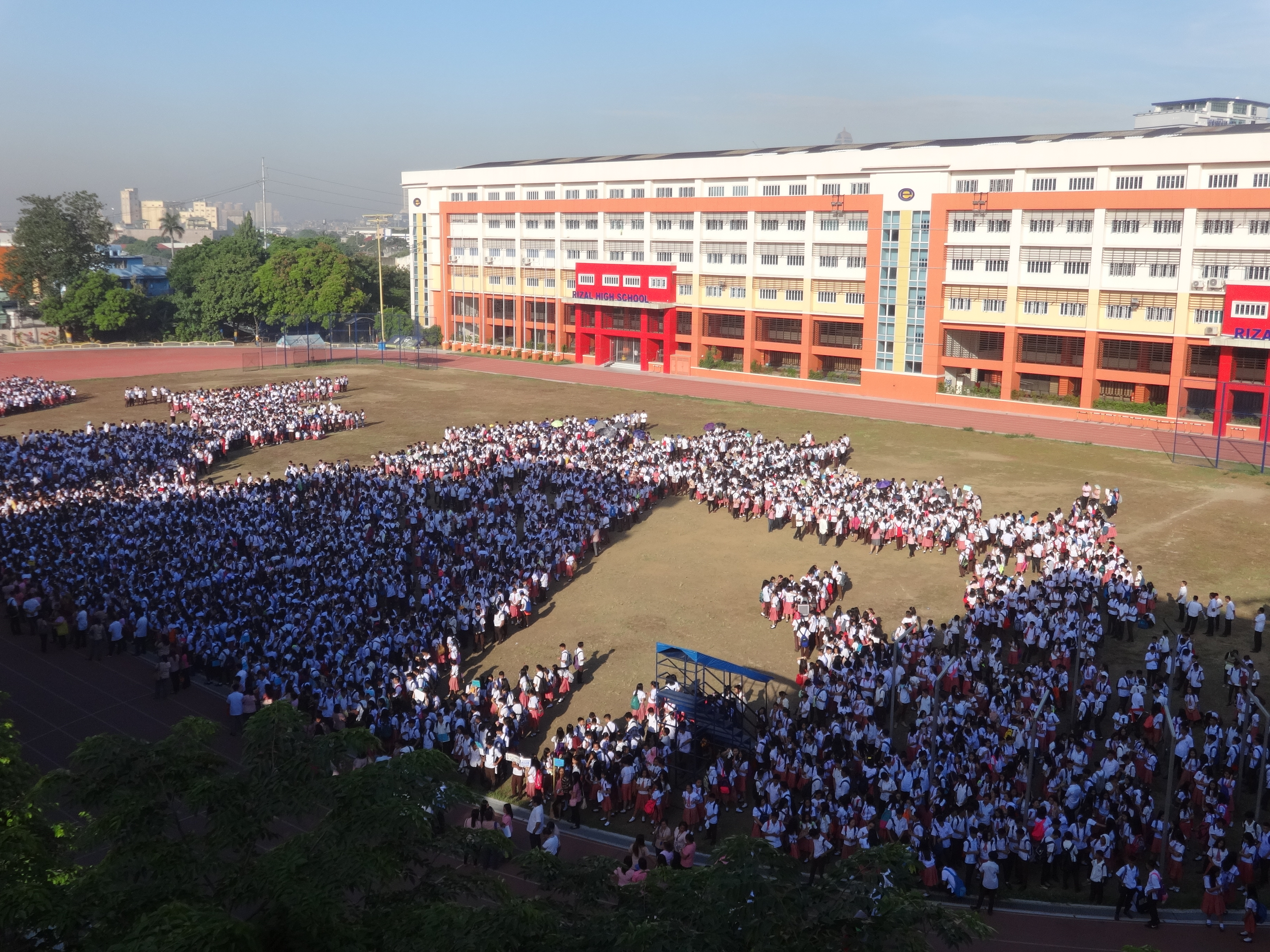

Location
- Dr. Sixto Antonio Avenue, Caniogan, Pasig, Metro Manila; Philippines

Information
- Former names: Pasig Secondary School (1902-1914)
- Type: Public High School
- Motto: "Strive for Excellence for the Glory of God"
- Established: 1902
- School code: 305413
- Principal: Richard Santos
- Grades: 7 to 12
- Campus: Urban
- Colors: Red and Brown
- Nickname: Rizalians
- Website: www.rizalhighpasig.edu.ph

Rizal High School (Filipino: Mataas na Paaralang Rizal), or commonly known as RHS, an institution of secondary education based in Pasig, Metro Manila, Philippines, has been listed as the "most populated secondary school in the world" since 1993 by the Guinness Book of World Records until 2005 when City Montessori School in Lucknow, India held the title of the world's most populated school, when it had 29,212 pupils, beating Rizal High School in Pasig, Philippines, which had 19,738 pupils.

The school was named after the Philippine national hero, Dr. Jose P. Rizal. Notable graduates of the institution include former Senate presidents Neptali Gonzales and Senator Jovito Salonga, former Senator Rene Saguisag, Maestro Lucio San Pedro, and National Artist Carlos "Botong" Francisco to mention a few.

== History ==
=== Pasig Secondary School ===
The first secondary school in the province of Rizal known as the Pasig Secondary School was established in 1902 during the incumbency of Governor Ambrosio Flores with an enrollment of 28 pupils. The students came from five neighboring towns including Pasig. The enrollment increased to 45 pupils in November, 65 in December and 88 in January and February in 1903, all intermediate pupils. The pupils were taught in a room of a rented building, 30 meters by 30 meters. The cost of the rent was $15, local currency, the amount paid from the provincial fund.

At the beginning, the Provincial Board was against the establishment of a provincial school in Pasig, which is near Manila. The increase in American financial support by the provincial government was subject to the condition that the pupils from adjoining towns would attend classes in the provincial school rather than seeking enrollment in Manila.

Immediately after the military post occupied by American soldiers was vacated, it was turned over to the provincial government for the use of the Pasig Secondary School in November 1903. The building, although quite spacious, was old and dilapidated with a badly damaged roof. The teachers assigned to this school were all Americans, namely, Messrs. Laughlin, Click and Scruton. The Superintendent of Schools was Charles Rummel.

The military post was vacated when a new building was constructed in 1902 during the administration of Governor Jose Tupas. The basement of the building was used as a woodworking shop. This was the time when a first year class was organized.

In 1913 a site of ten lots, of 63,707.41 square meters, was acquired through expropriation proceedings from landowners. The estimated value of the site was P38,540. It was surveyed on November 8, 1928, and registered on October 27, 1931, under Certificate of Title No. 4553. Soon, after the acquisition of the site, a modern, reinforced concrete and modified Standard Plan No. 20 school building was constructed. This was in 1914 during the tenure of Governor Mariano Melendres. The building was completed and occupied in 1915.

=== Change of name ===
The name of Pasig Secondary School was changed to Rizal High School when a first year class of eleven pupils was organized and when the province was already putting up the greater bulk of the financial support for the school. The change to the present name Rizal High School was made in 1914 when the new building was completed and occupied by the school.

For many years since its establishment in 1902, the intermediate classes were under the supervision and administration of the secondary school principal. These classes were considered a preparatory department of the secondary school. The gradual change in administration started with the school year 1920–1921. The complete separation of the intermediate classes as a preparatory department to the high school took effect in 1924.

The first graduating class was in 1918. Of the 30 fourth year students for the month of March, 27 qualified for graduation. Two of the graduates who later distinguished themselves in their chosen professions were U.P. Professor Cecilio Lopez and Dr. Elpidio Alcantara.

The first principal of the Pasig Secondary School was Steward Laughlin who also served as one of its earliest teachers. The first Filipino principal was Marcelino Bautista who served during the school year 1929–1930, followed by Ricardo Castro in 1930–1935, Aquilino Carino in 1935–1936, Eufrocino Malonzo in 1936–1939. The years preceding the Second World War saw Eliseo Tayao as principal of the Rizal High School (1939–1941). The school was closed for sometime and was reopened with Cesario Bandong.

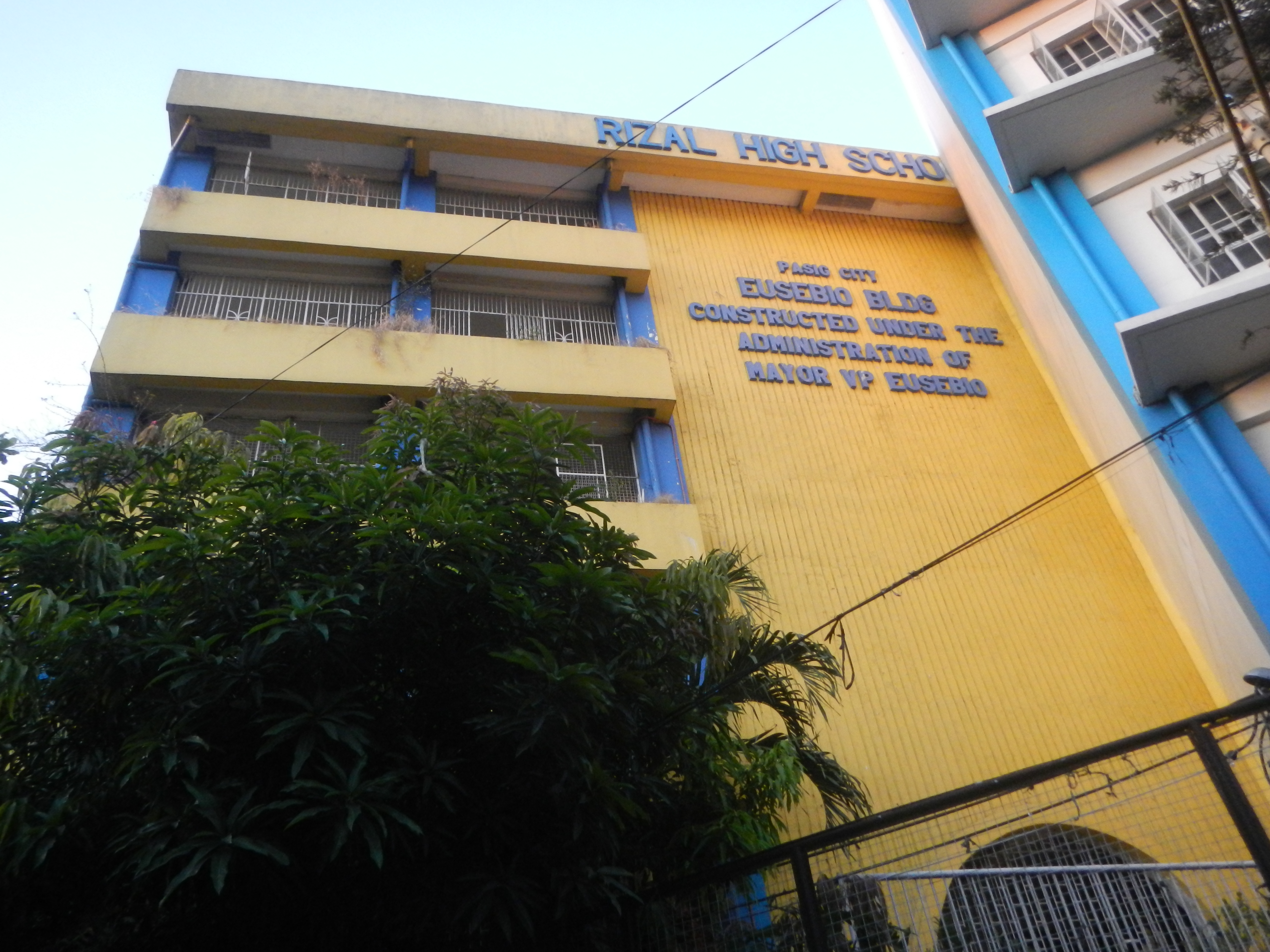
Eusebio building

=== Classes after Liberation ===
The carpet-bombing employed by the American Liberation Forces destroyed the high school building and grounds. Classes therefore were reorganized in 1945 at the Pasig Elementary School by Paterno Santiago (later to become principal of Morong High School). He took charge of the administration of the Rizal High School for about a month when he gave way to Cesario Bandong who served as principal until 1950. The reconstruction of the Rizal High School was started on February 4, 1948, out of the War Damage Fund in the amount of PHP101,445.49 during the incumbency of Governor Doctor Sixto Antonio. The reconstruction was completed on August 15, 1949. Demetrio M. Suguitan took over from Bandong (1950–1960). Modesta T. Javier became the principal in 1960–1974; Cesar S. Tiangco came in 1975 up to January 1980. Diana C. Santos became principal from 1980 until 1999. Josephine M. Cruz, who was then the Schools Division English Supervisor for the secondary level, was installed as Santos' replacement in 1999. Josephine M. Cruz was principal until 2012. Virginia R. Membrebe, a former Social Studies teacher of Rizal High School prior to her elevation to the principalship of Santa Lucia High School, was the principal of RHS from 2012-2017. Mr. Gilbert O. Inocencio replaced Ms. Membrebe in 2018 and is the current principal.

=== "Batibot" heritage acacia trees ===
In July 2022, the Department of Environment and Natural Resources and Pasig LGU officials led the declaration ceremony, including the installation of a historical markers on 2 acacia as heritage trees in RHS. Metro Manila's 36th and 37th heritage trees are believed to have been planted before 1902, as it is fondly called by teachers and students as 'Batibot'.

== Gallery ==
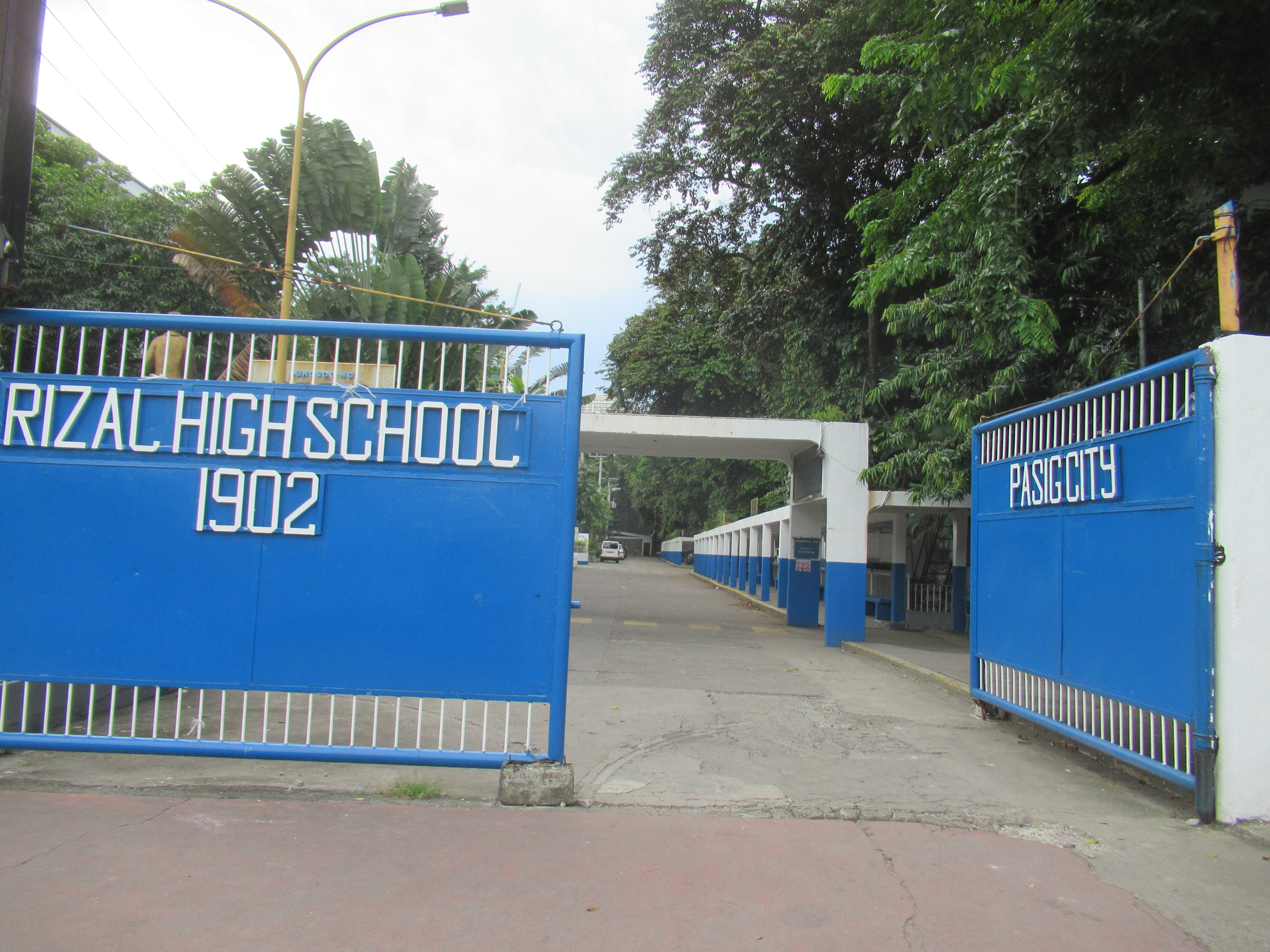
1902 main gate

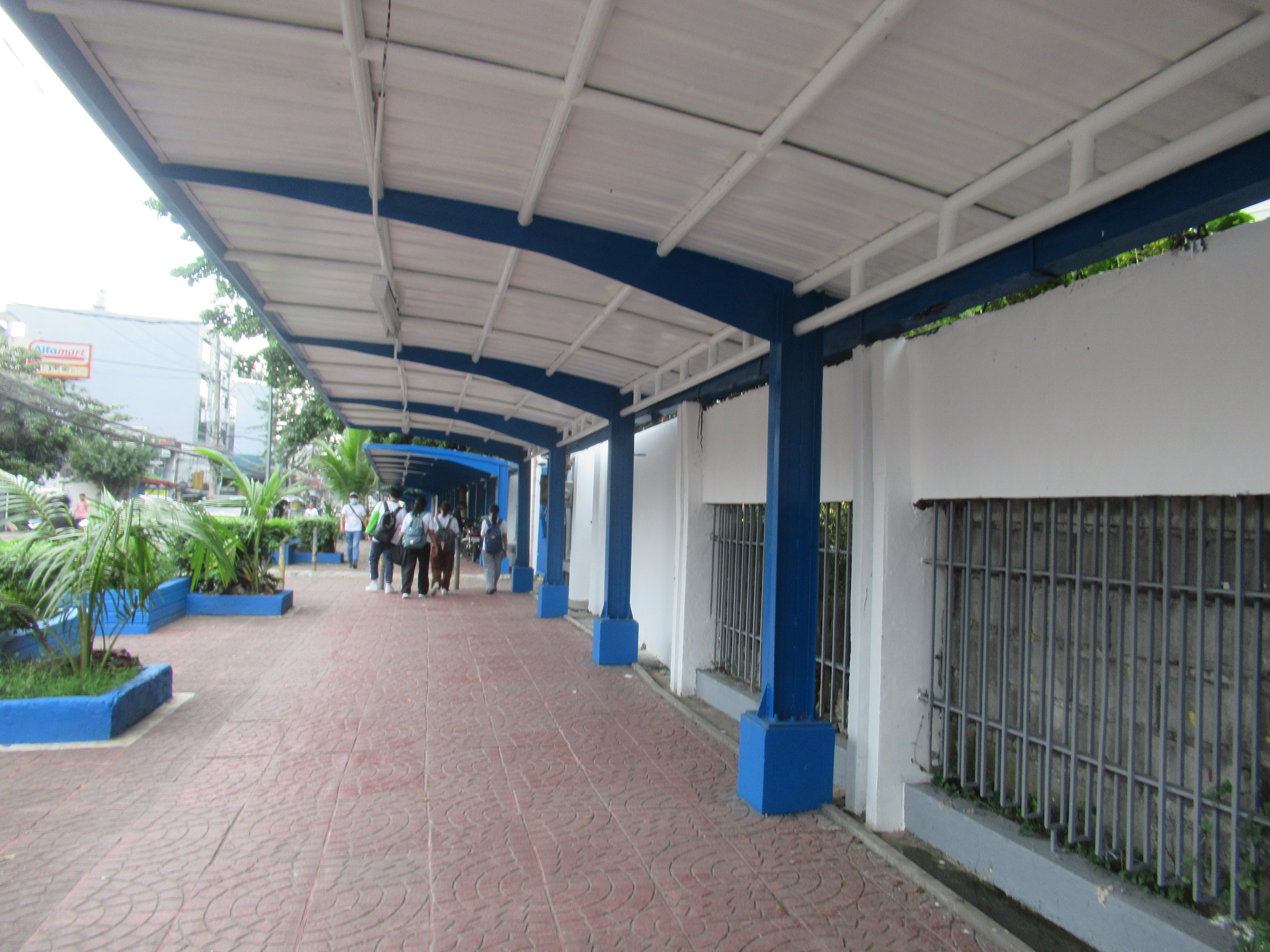
Covered walkway

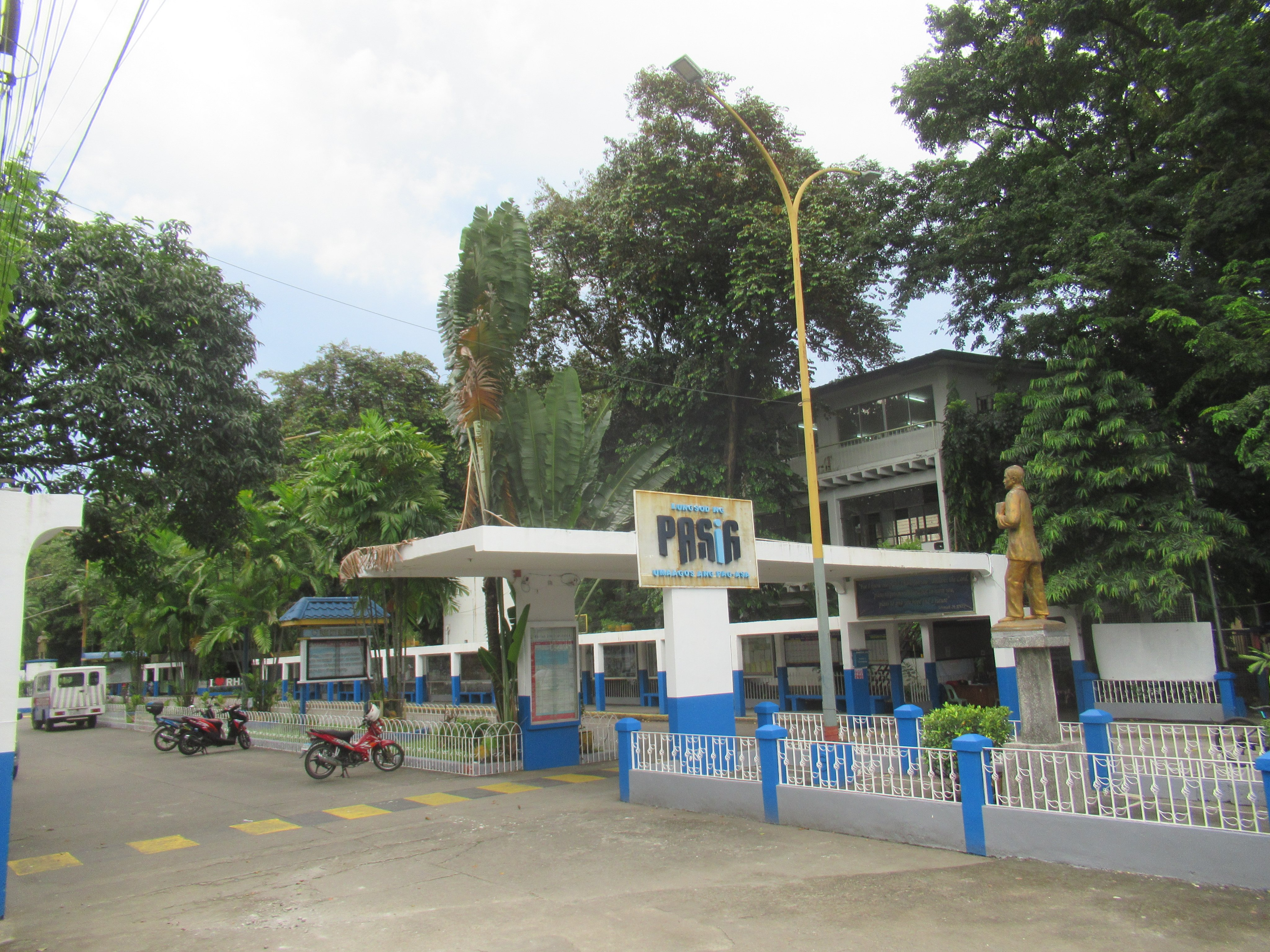
Interior with José Rizal monument

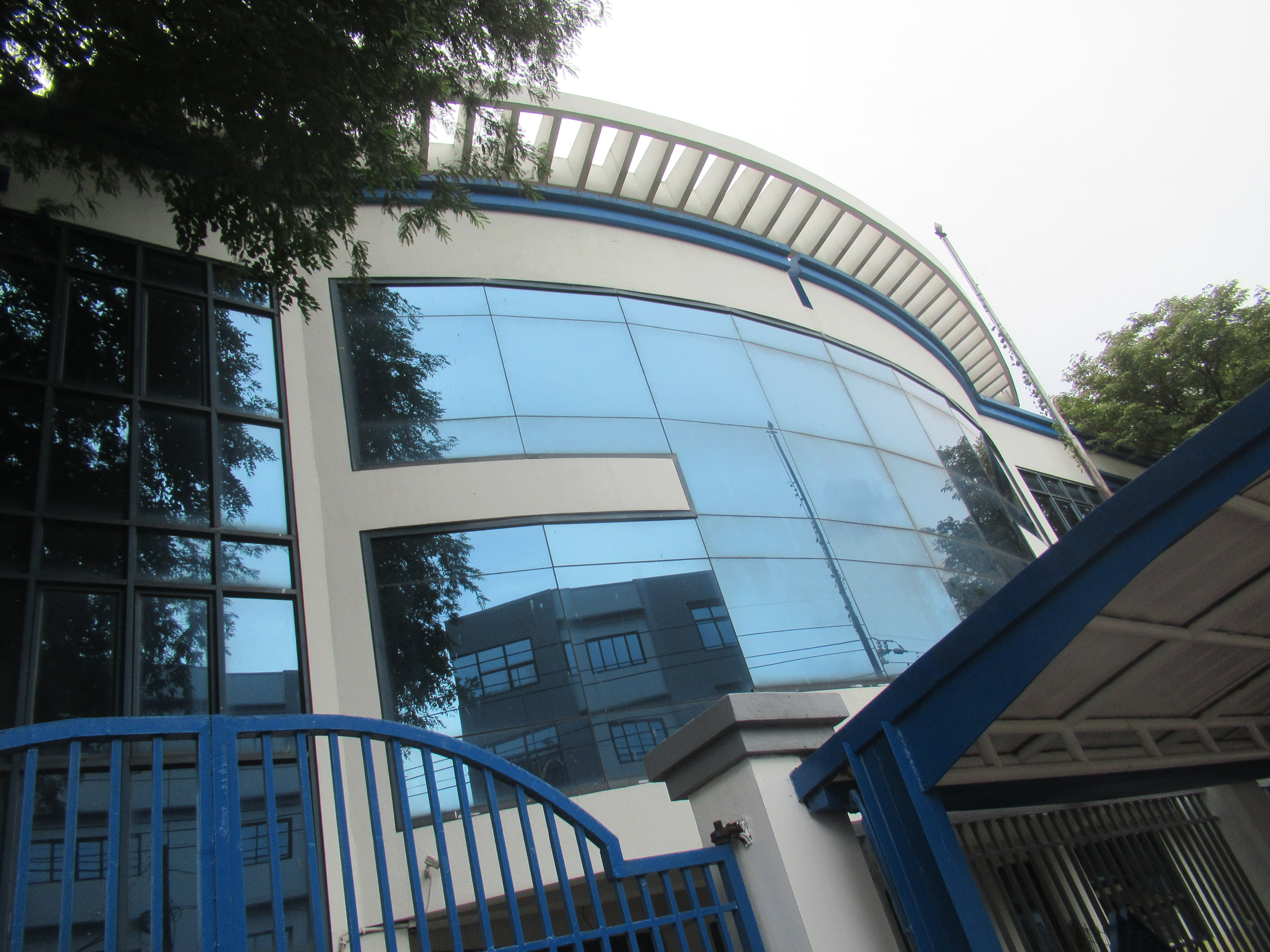
New façade

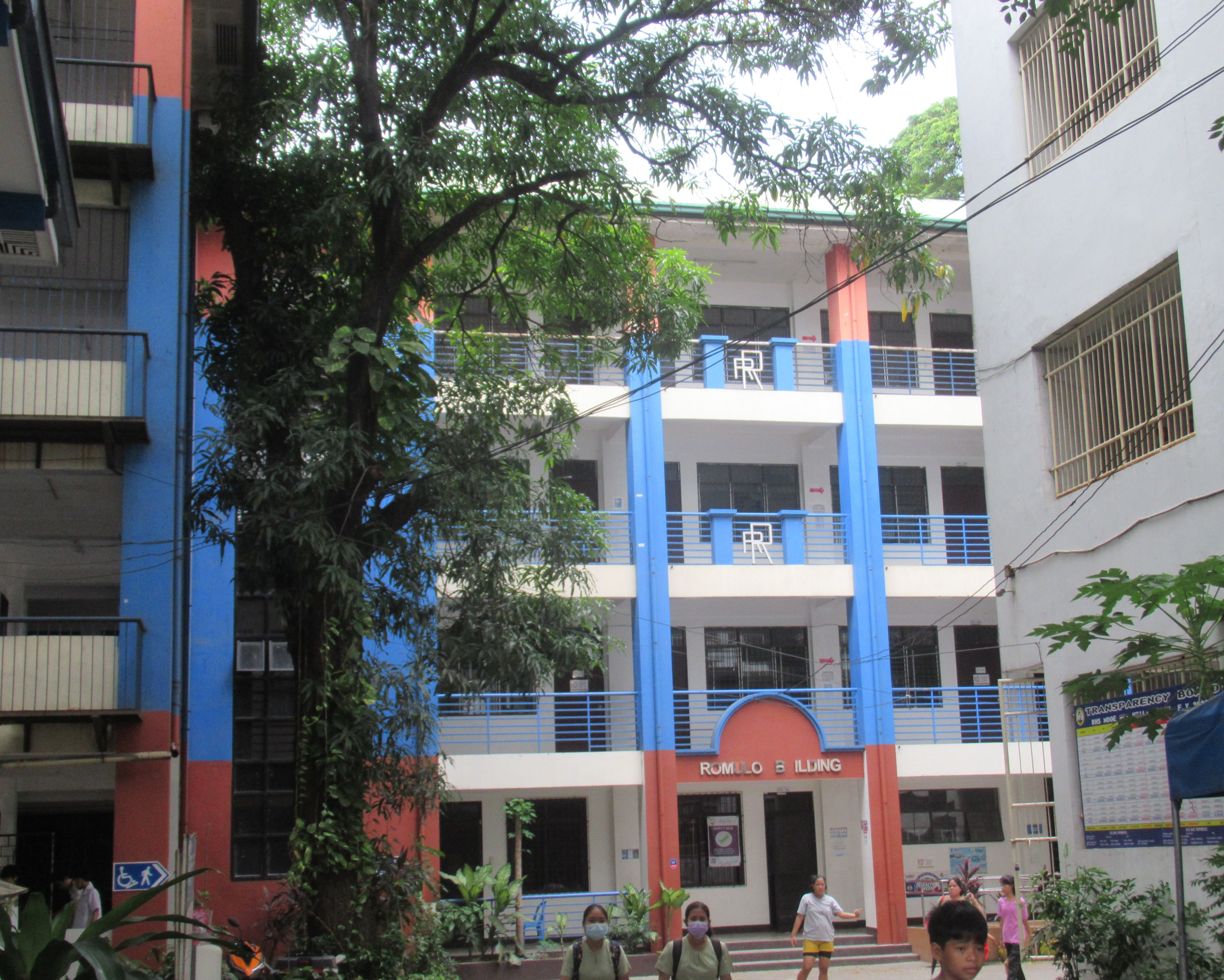
Romulo building

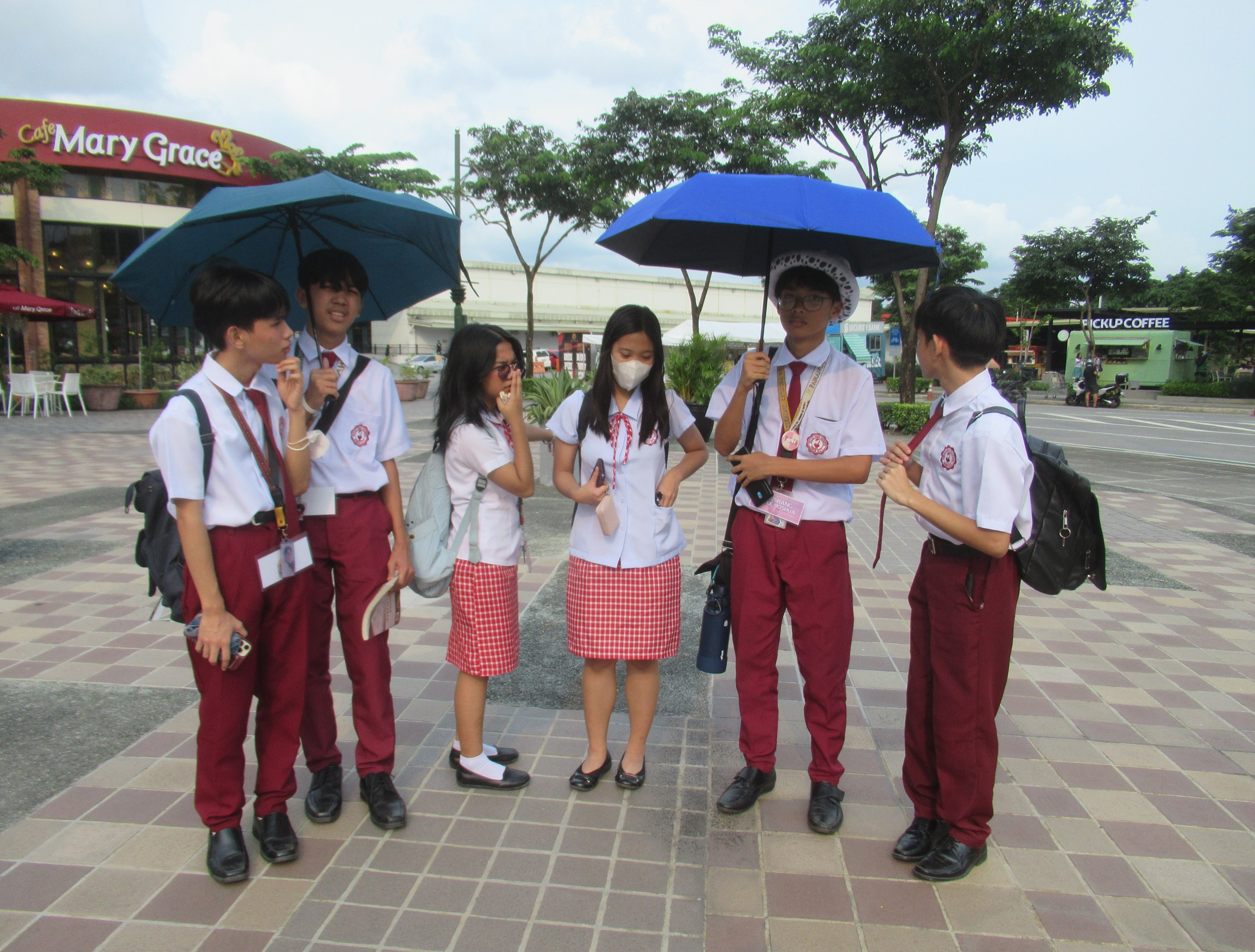
RHS Senior High school students in Arcovia City
