= Malinta (disambiguation) =

Malinta may refer to:

- Malinta, Ohio, a village in the United States
- Malinta Tunnel, an underground bunker on Corregidor Island in the Philippines
- Malinta, a barangay in Valenzuela, Metro Manila in the Philippines
