= Tagalag, Valenzuela =

Barangay in Valenzuela City, Metro Manila, Philippines

Tagalag
- Barangay
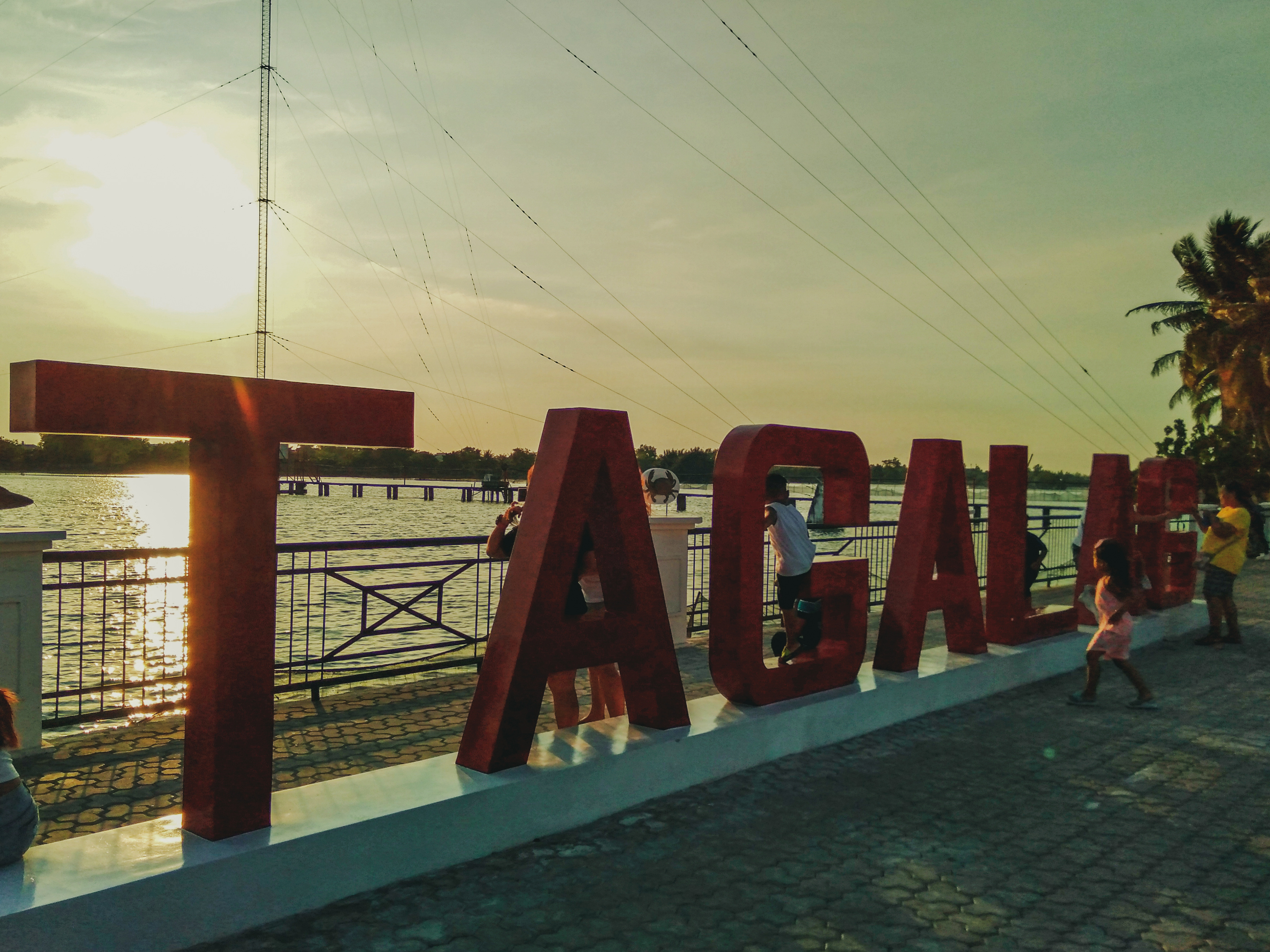

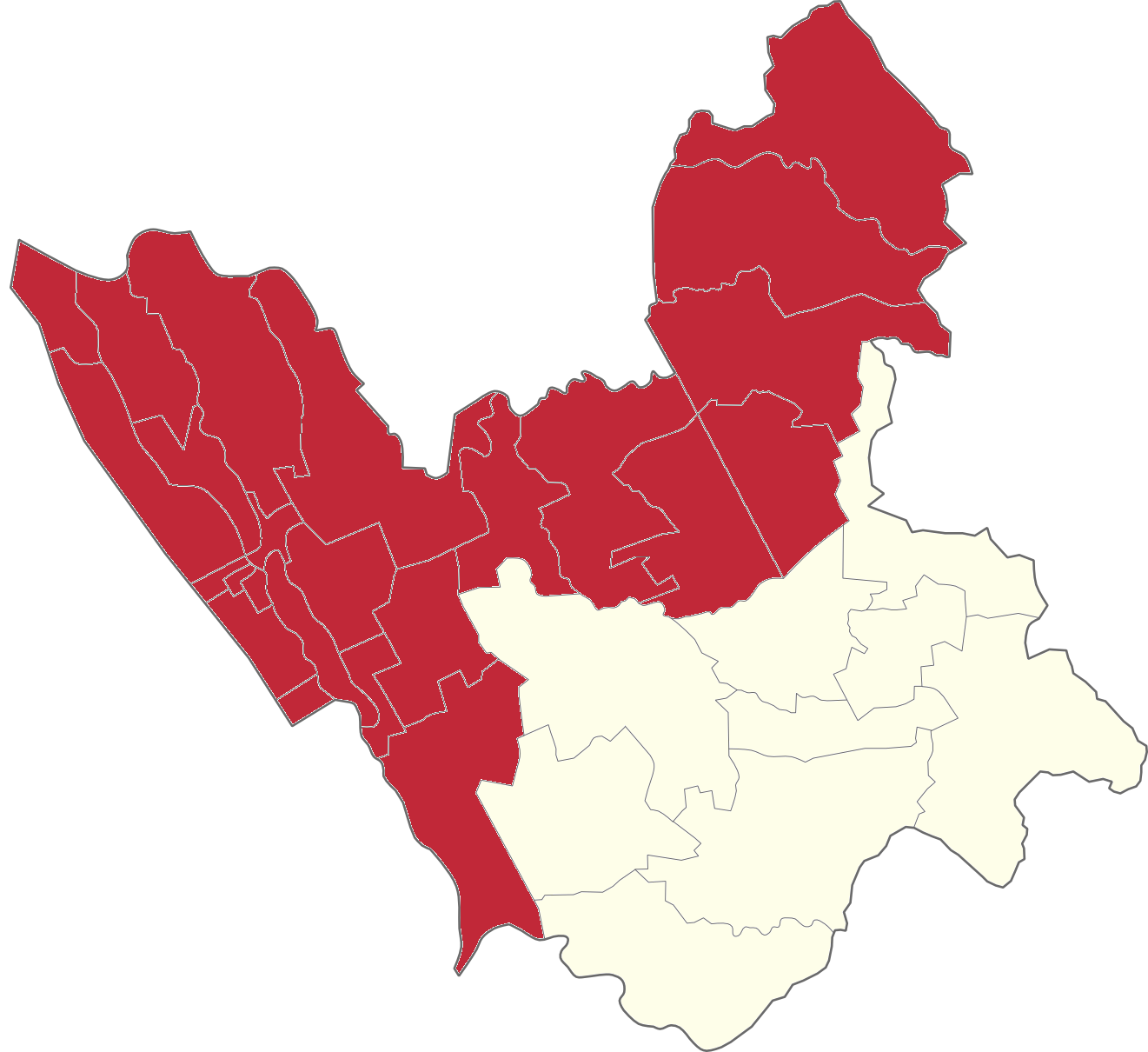
- Location of Tagalag in the 1st Valenzuela legislative district
- Coordinates: 14°43′29″N 120°56′15″E
- Country: Philippines
- Region: National Capital Region
- City: Valenzuela
- Congressional districts: Part of the 1st district of Valenzuela

Government
  - Barangay Chairman: Renato Francisco Bernardo

Area
  - Total: 101 ha (250 acres)

Population (May 2020)
  - Total: 3,400
  - Density: 3,400/km^{2} (8,700/sq mi)
- ZIP code: 1444
- Area code: 2
- PSGC: 137504029
- Website: https://www.facebook.com/tagalag2023

Tagalag, also known as Taga-Ilog, is an urban barangay in Valenzuela, Metro Manila,Philippines. It is one of Valenzuela's northernmost barangays bordering Meycauayan in Bulacan and is famous for fish products such as tilapia and bangus, as well as desserts such as halaya and garbanzos. It was declared as a city eco-tourism zone in 2016.

It is bounded by Polo River in the west, the Meycauayan River in the north and the Coloong river in the east.

== Etymology ==
The name of the barangay is a combination of the Filipino words taga, meaning "belonging", and alog, which means "a pool of water in a field", owing to the flooding of the area that has formed the area's identity.

Its former name, Taga-Ilog, meaning "from the river", is a nod to the vast expanse of aquatic resources in the area brought in from the three connected rivers.

== History ==
The flat, low-lying terrain of the CAMANAVA area in Metro Manila is an area prone to flooding. This was the case as the Tagalag area was a large rice field until strong rainfall from a typhoon in the 1970s caused the area to flood. When the floods did not subside, the Tagalag area became a fishing site, as it attracted fish from the Polo, Meycauayan, and Colong rivers.

On May 22, 2024, Tagalag Public Library in the Barangay Hall was inaugurated by local officials. Spearheaded by the Sangguniang Kabataan, it features a computer area with high-speed internet access and offers limited free printing of students' documents.

== Festivals ==
Residents of Tagalag celebrate a fiesta every May 10 with a fishing contest.

== Tourism ==
Tagalag Fishing Village, the first fishing village in the city of Valenzuela, was formally inaugurated on February 15, 2020. The fishing haven is considered to be the city's "best-kept secret”, which lies beside a 1,300-meter fenced boardwalk, with light posts, adorned with statues of fish that can be caught there. It was constructed to preserve the fishing site.

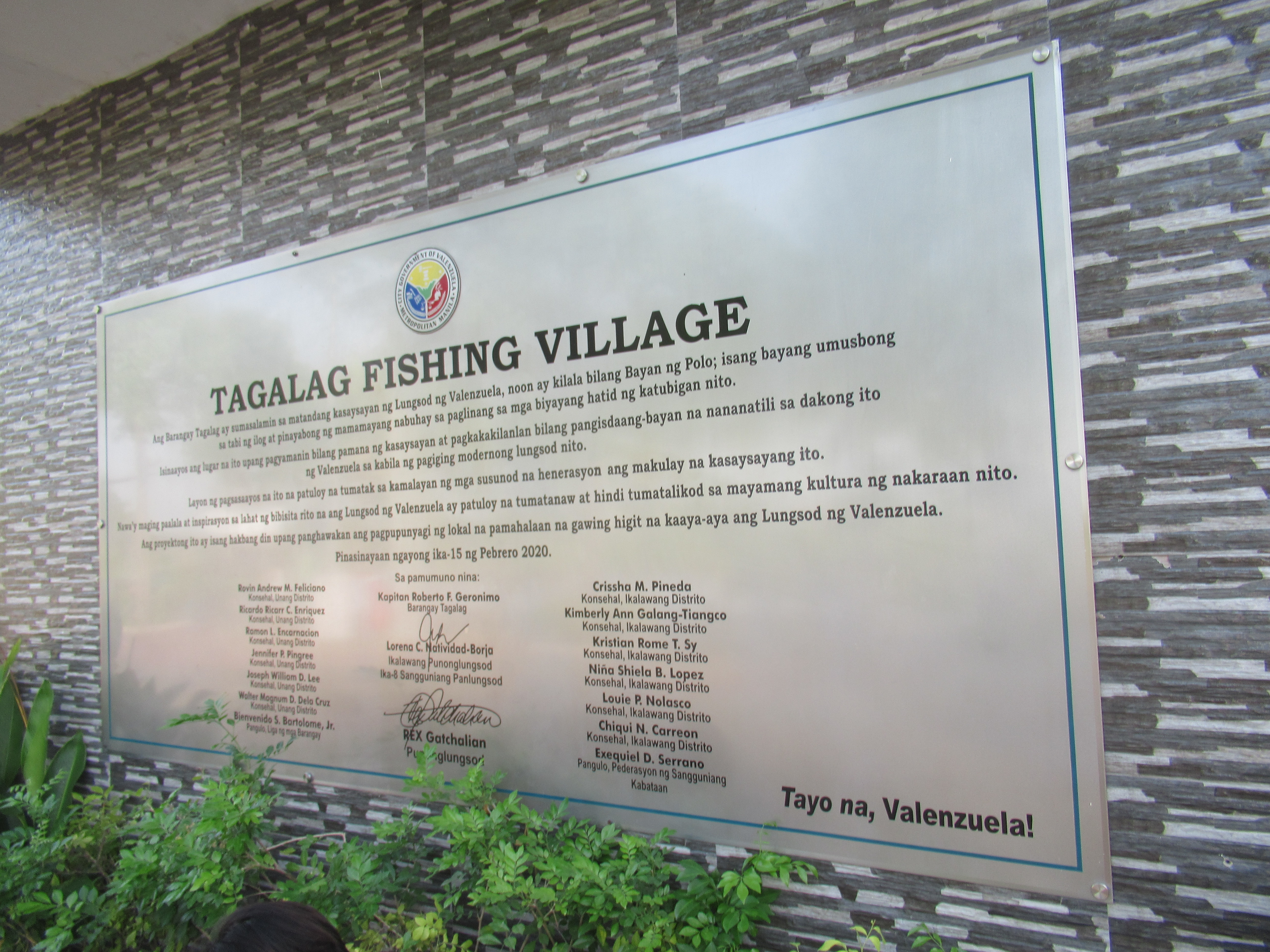
Tagalag Fishing Village

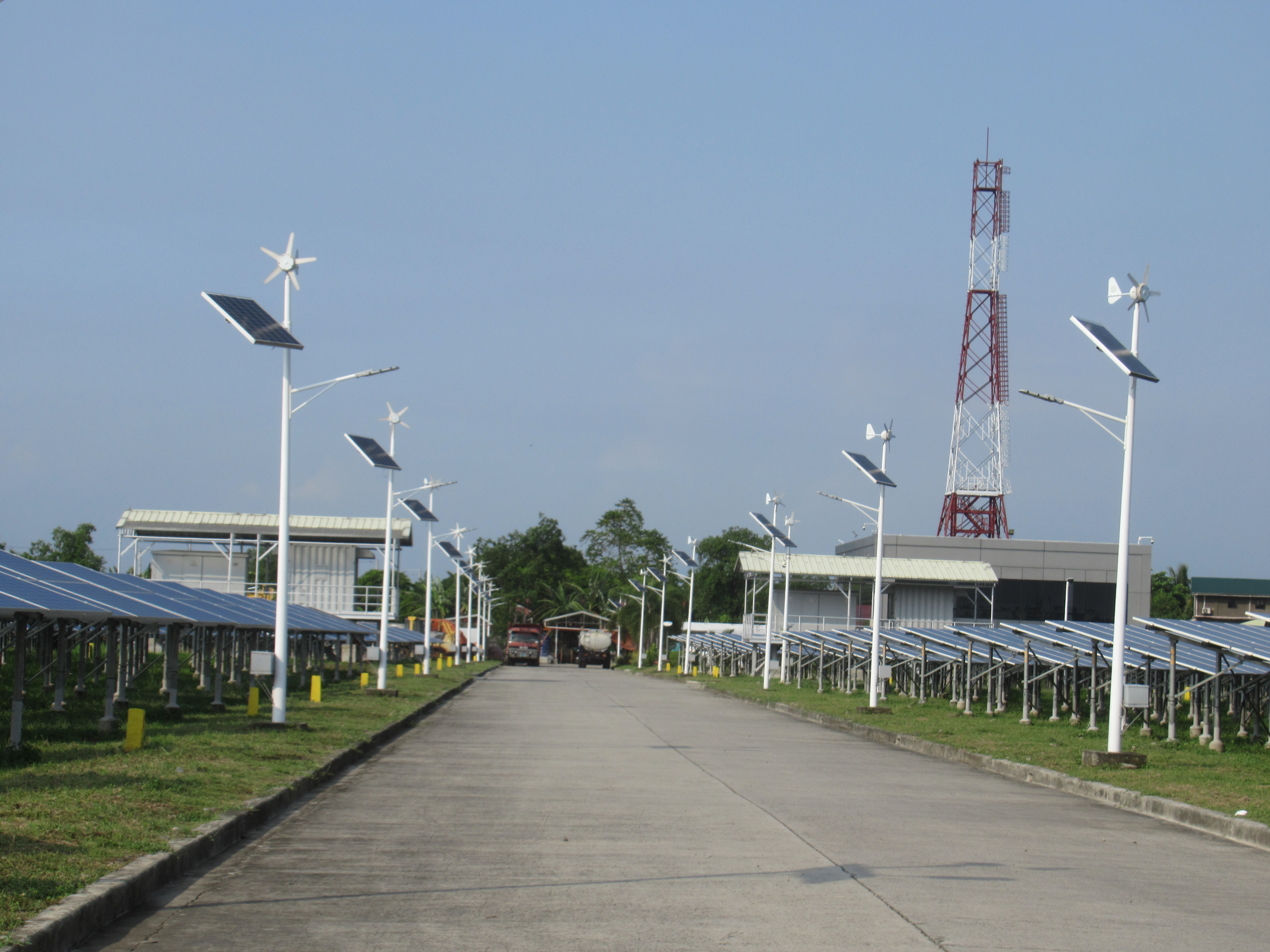
Tagalag Solar Energy Farm

Various activities are also offered in the area such as jogging on the boardwalk, recreational fishing, line fishing tutorials, bird watching, boating, photowalk, and sunset watching. Migratory birds can also be seen in the distance in the area.

Tilapia, bangus, and hito are among the types of fish can be caught in the fishing site.

To promote responsible and sustainable tourism, accreditation and tourism standards are being maintained by the community-based tourism council. Park rangers also enforce Tagalag Linear Park rules to maintain peace and cleanliness in the village.

The Valenzuela boardwalk is a conversion of "Tagalag Fishing Village"s' 1.3-kilometer (0.81 mi) flood dike (protection) into a walkway with a bike trail, among other attractions. Its flood wall has a four-meter-wide linear park traversing Barangays Coloong, Tagalag, and Wawang Polo. It was inaugurated by a walkathon in September, 2024.

=== Accredited Establishments ===
- D’Cove Pavilion and Fishing Ground
- La Casa Antigo Resort
- Llenado Fishing Facility
- Sitio Rosal Pavilion
- Boy Bartolome Fishpond
- Melandro Vergino Fishpond
- Kainan sa Palaisdaan ni Tata Celo
- Kamayan sa Palapat
- Alvarez Park Cafe
- La Casa Antigo Pavilion
- Patio Roberto
- Osting's Yard
- Koneksyon
- Nanay Aning's
- Sizzling
- Biker's Hub

== Government ==
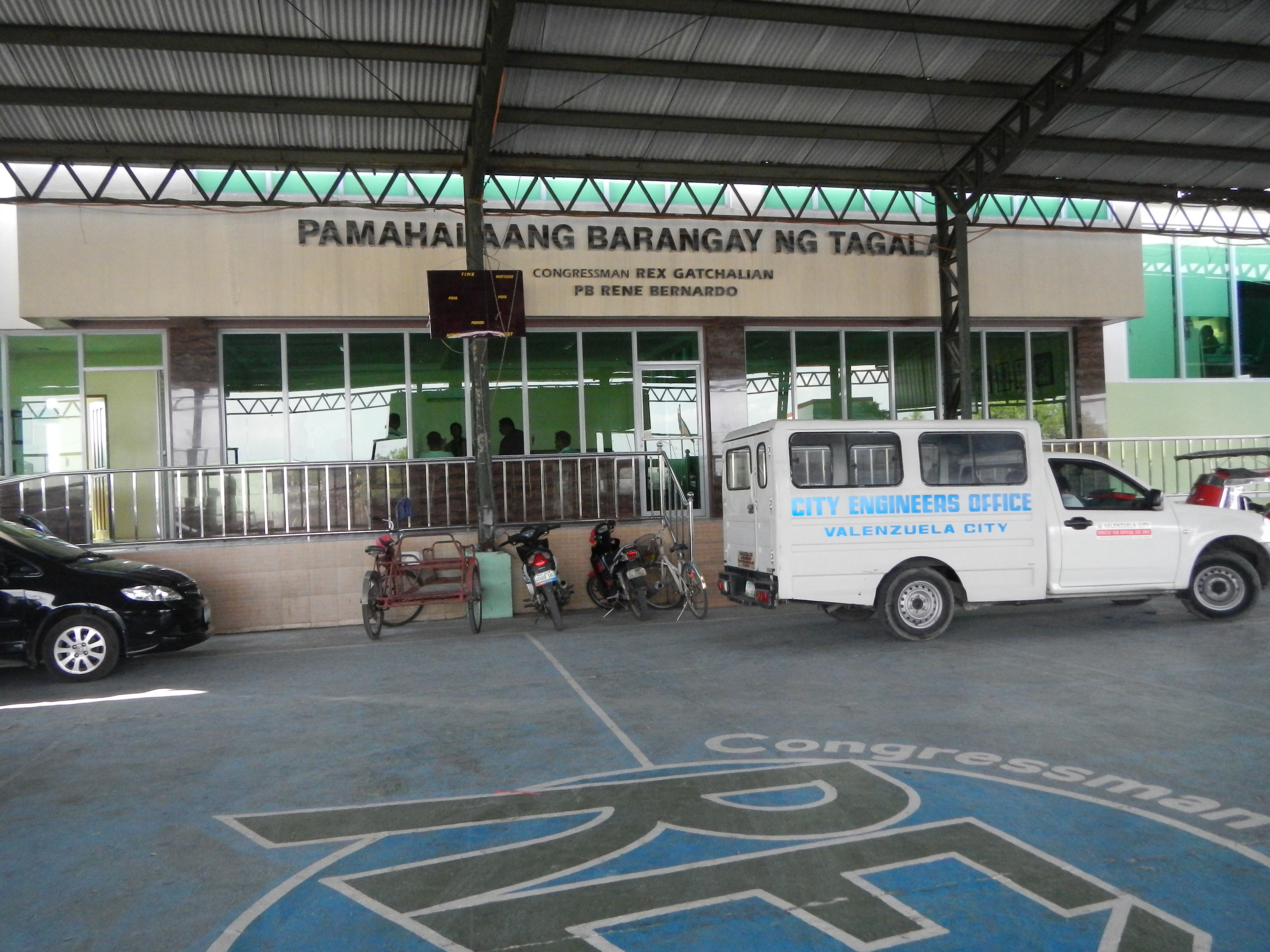
Facade, Barangay Hall

The seat of government of Tagalag is located at the curve of Rosal Street and Balikatan Street, alongside the water body of the fishing village.

== Recognition ==
Tagalag Fishing Village was among the initiatives recognized among the Top 10 Outstanding Local Governance Programs at the 2021 Galing Pook Awards, held virtually on October 20, 2021.
