= List of barangays in Valenzuela =

This is a list of barangays in Valenzuela in the Philippines based on 2015 census data of the Philippine Statistics Authority.

== List of barangays ==
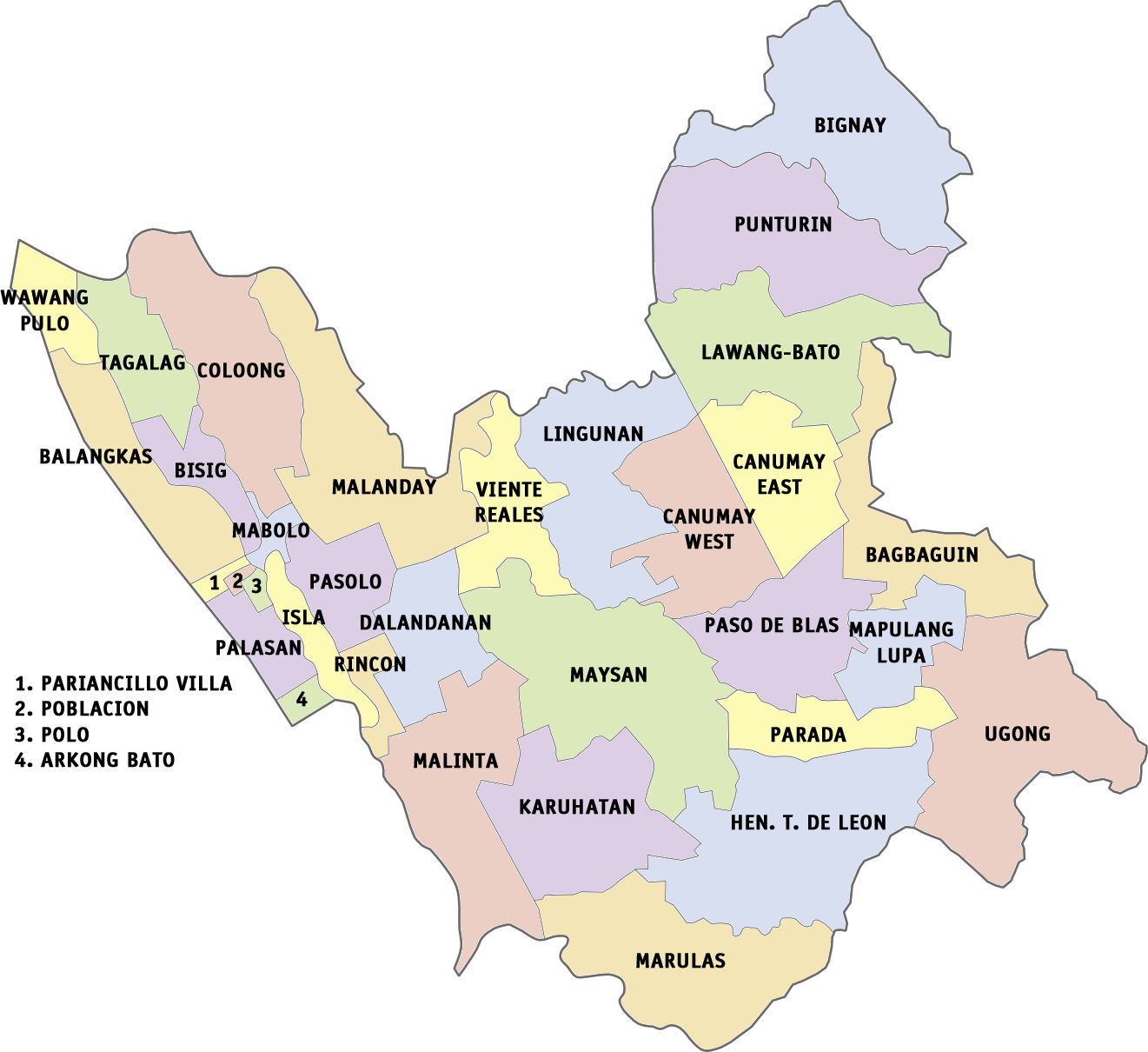
Political map of Valenzuela showing barangay boundaries.

Barangay	District	Area (ha)	Population (2015)	Density (per ha)	PSG Code	Classification
Arkong Bato	1st	34.40	10,004	290.814	137504001	Urban
Bagbaguin	2nd	159.10	13,770	86.55	137504002	Urban
Balangkas	1st	73.30	11,892	162.24	137504003	Urban
Bignay	1st	268.80	27,059	100.67	137504005	Urban
Bisig	1st	45.60	1,333	45.6	137504006	Urban
Canumay East	1st	217.30	28,213	129.83	137504033	Urban
Canumay West	1st	141.30	22,215	157.22	137504007	Urban
Coloong	1st	223.80	11,154	49.84	137504009	Urban
Dalandanan	1st	93.90	18,733	199.50	137504010	Urban
Gen. T. de Leon	2nd	366.90	89,441	243.77	137504011	Urban
Isla	1st	39.60	4,793	121.04	137504012	Urban
Karuhatan	2nd	190.60	40,996	215.09	137504008	Urban
Lawang Bato	1st	287.50	19,301	67.13	137504013	Urban
Lingunan	1st	115.90	21,217	183.06	137504014	Urban
Mabolo	1st	115.00	1,217	10.58	137504015	Urban
Malanday	1st	295.60	17,948	60.72	137504016	Urban
Malinta	1st	174.10	48,397	277.98	137504017	Urban
Mapulang Lupa	2nd	140.80	27,354	194.28	137504018	Urban
Marulas	2nd	224.70	53,978	240.22	137504019	Urban
Maysan	2nd	253.30	24,293	95.91	137504020	Urban
Palasan	1st	15.60	6,089	390.32	137504021	Urban
Parada	2nd	34.40	14,894	432.97	137504004	Urban
Pariancillo Villa	1st	5.00	1,634	326.80	137504022	Urban
Paso de Blas	2nd	155.00	13,350	86.13	137504023	Urban
Pasolo	1st	79.50	6,395	80.44	137504024	Urban
Poblacion	1st	3.40	372	109.41	137504025	Urban
Polo	1st	5.20	1,103	212.12	137504026	Urban
Punturin	1st	162.20	20,930	129.04	137504027	Urban
Rincon	1st	24.40	6,603	270.61	137504028	Urban
Tagalag	1st	101.00	3,209	31.77	137504029	Urban
Ugong	2nd	307.20	41,821	136.14	137504030	Urban
Veinte Reales	1st	192.90	22,949	118.97	137504031	Urban
Wawang Pulo	1st	27.80	3,516	126.47	137504032	Urban

=== Alternate names of barangays ===
- Canumay West is the political name for the barangay but it is sometimes called Canumay.
- Gen. T. de Leon is sometimes spelled as Hen. T. de Leon ("Hen." being Heneral, the Filipino equivalent for Gen. or General), and sometimes abbreviated as GTDL.
- Karuhatan is sometimes spelled as Caruhatan.
- Marulas is sometimes called BBB or simply BB. Balintawak Beer Brewery (BBB) used to be located in Marulas before it was acquired by San Miguel Corporation to form San Miguel Polo Beer Brewery.
- Paso de Blas is sometimes called Tollgate because of Paso de Blas Exit (also known as Malinta Exit and Valenzuela Exit) at Km. 15 of North Luzon Expressway.
- Veinte Reales is sometimes spelled as Viente Reales or Veintereales, with i and e interchanged, without affecting its pronunciation.

== Gallery ==
Barangays of Valenzuela
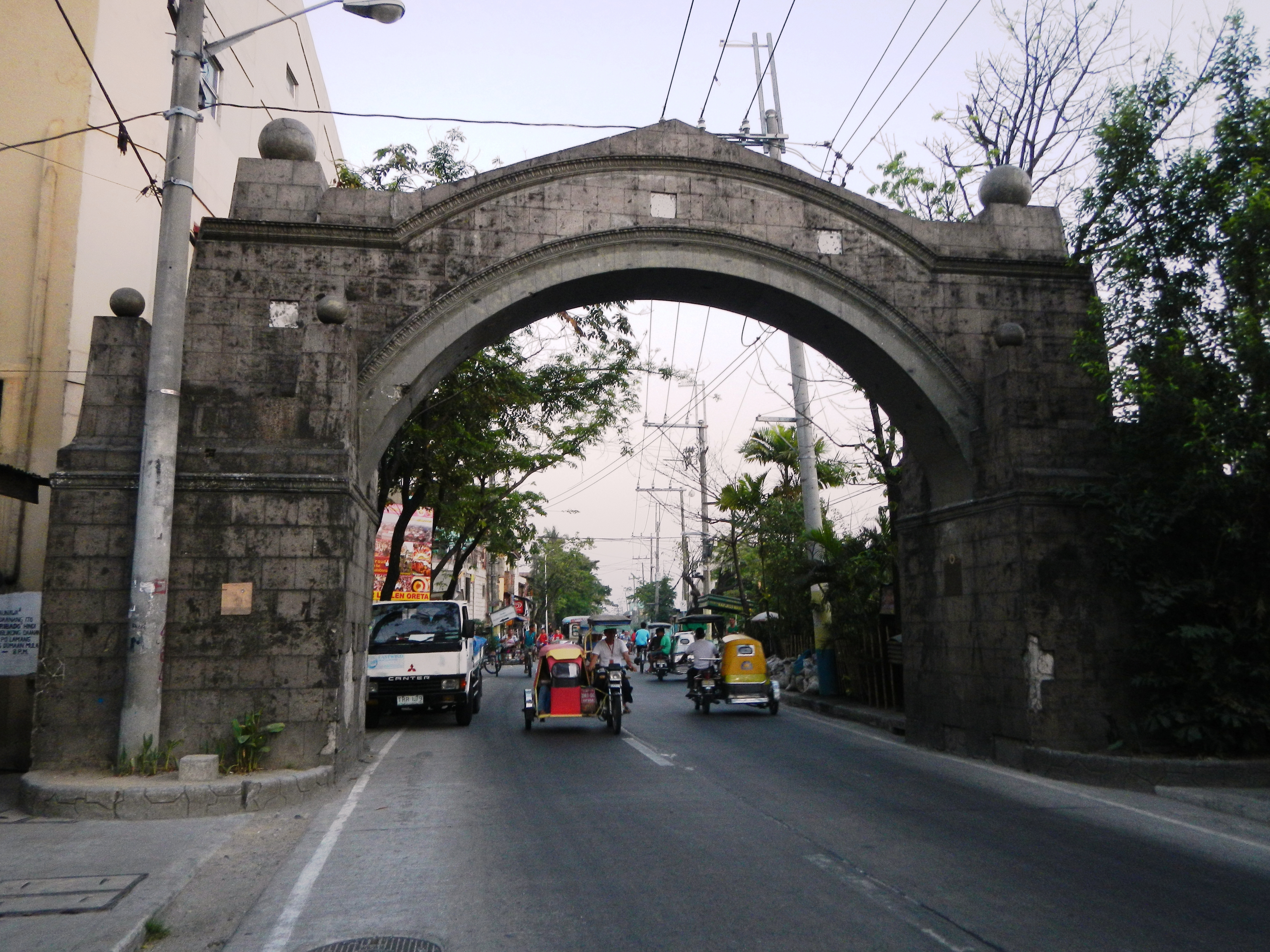
Stone arch marker in Arkong Bato

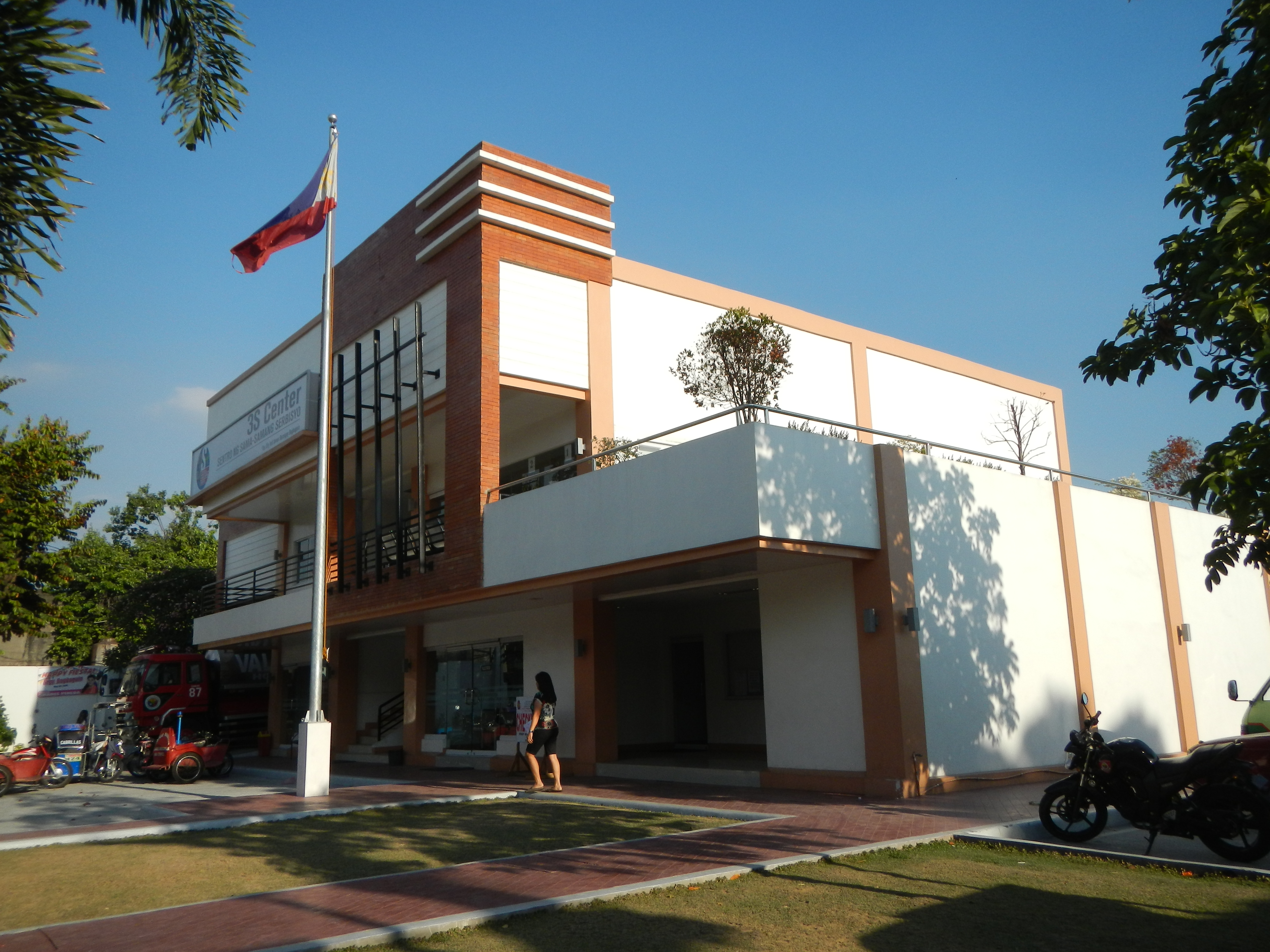
Bagbaguin barangay hall

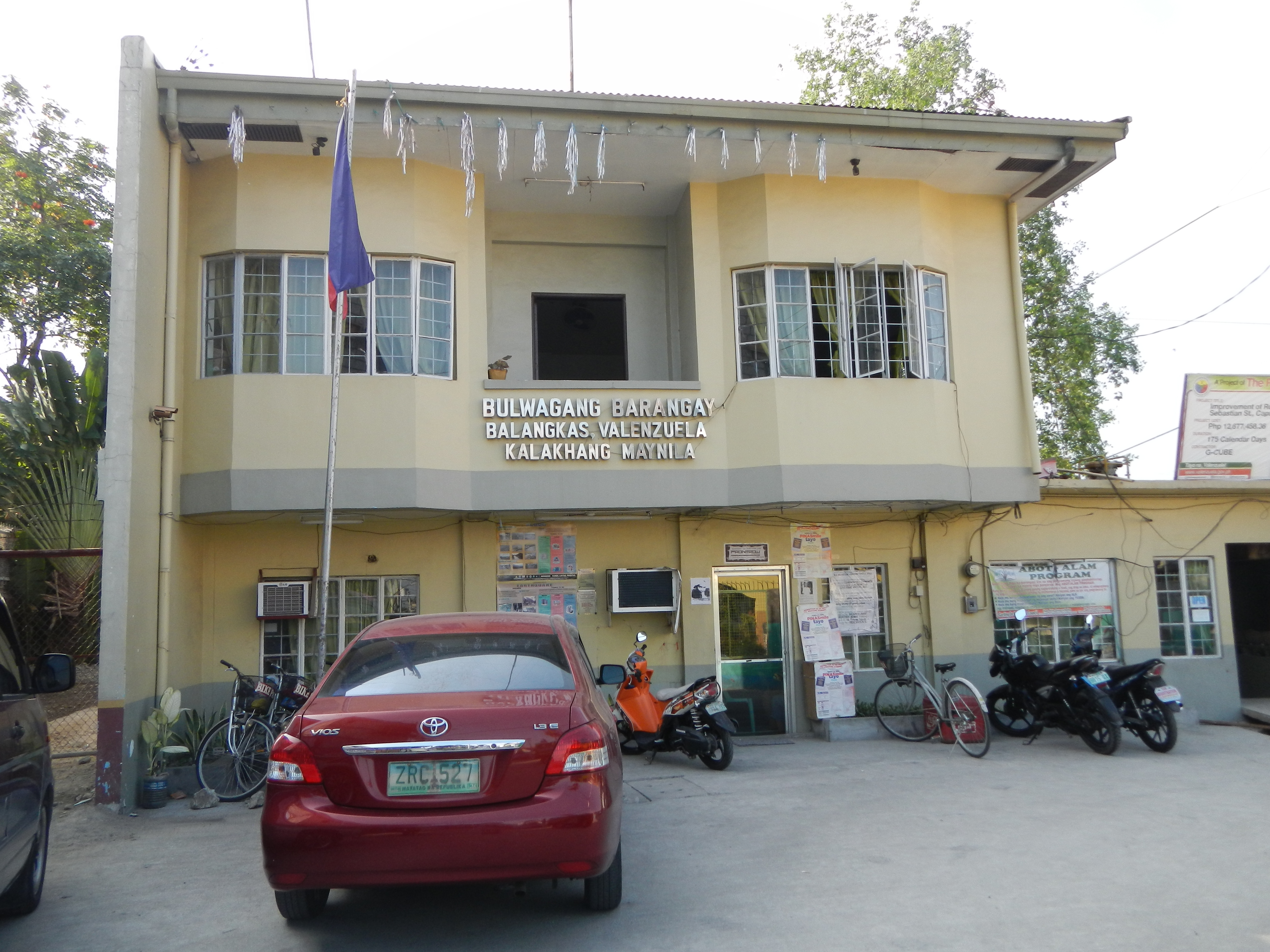
Balangkas barangay hall

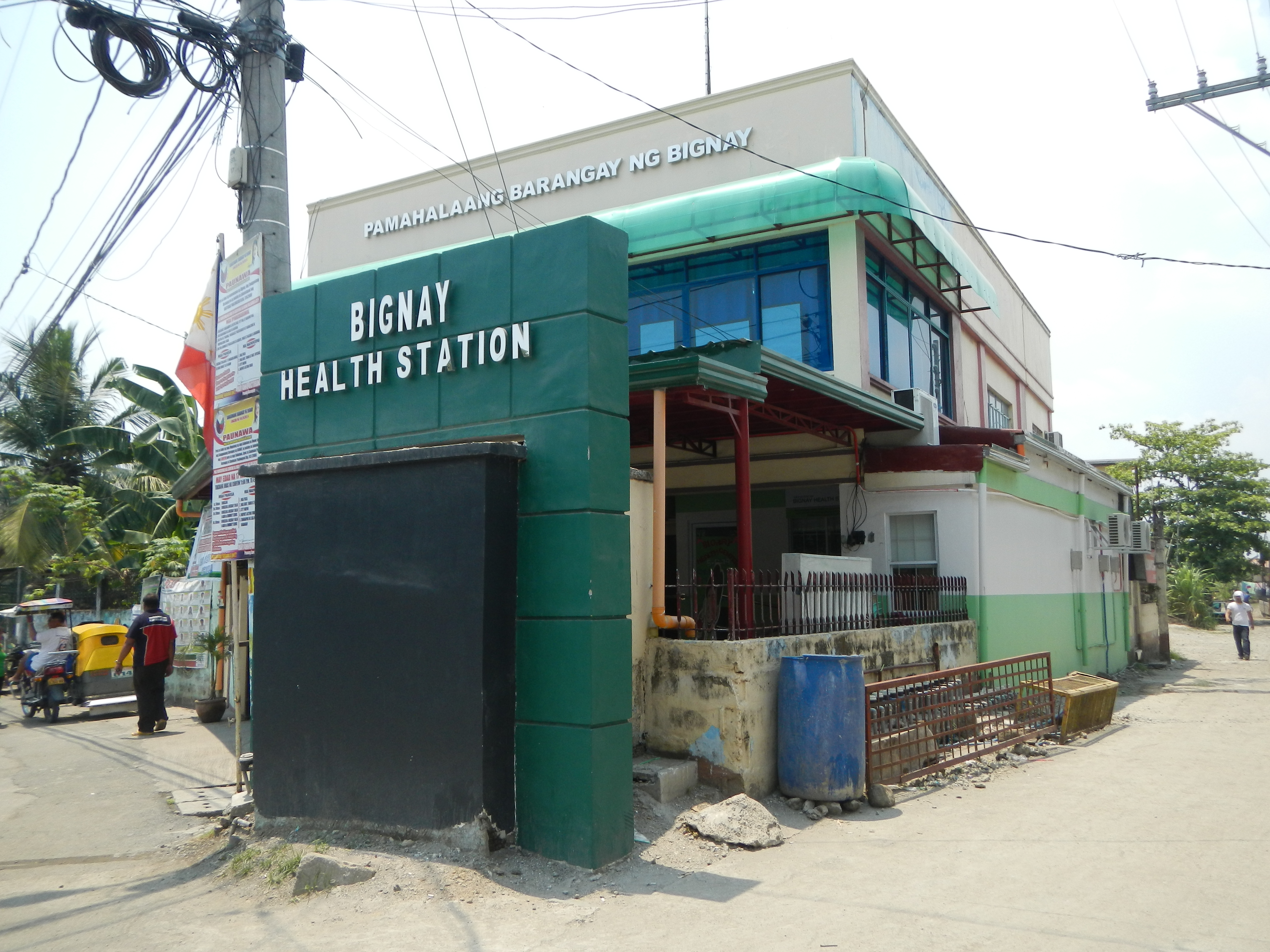
Bignay barangay hall

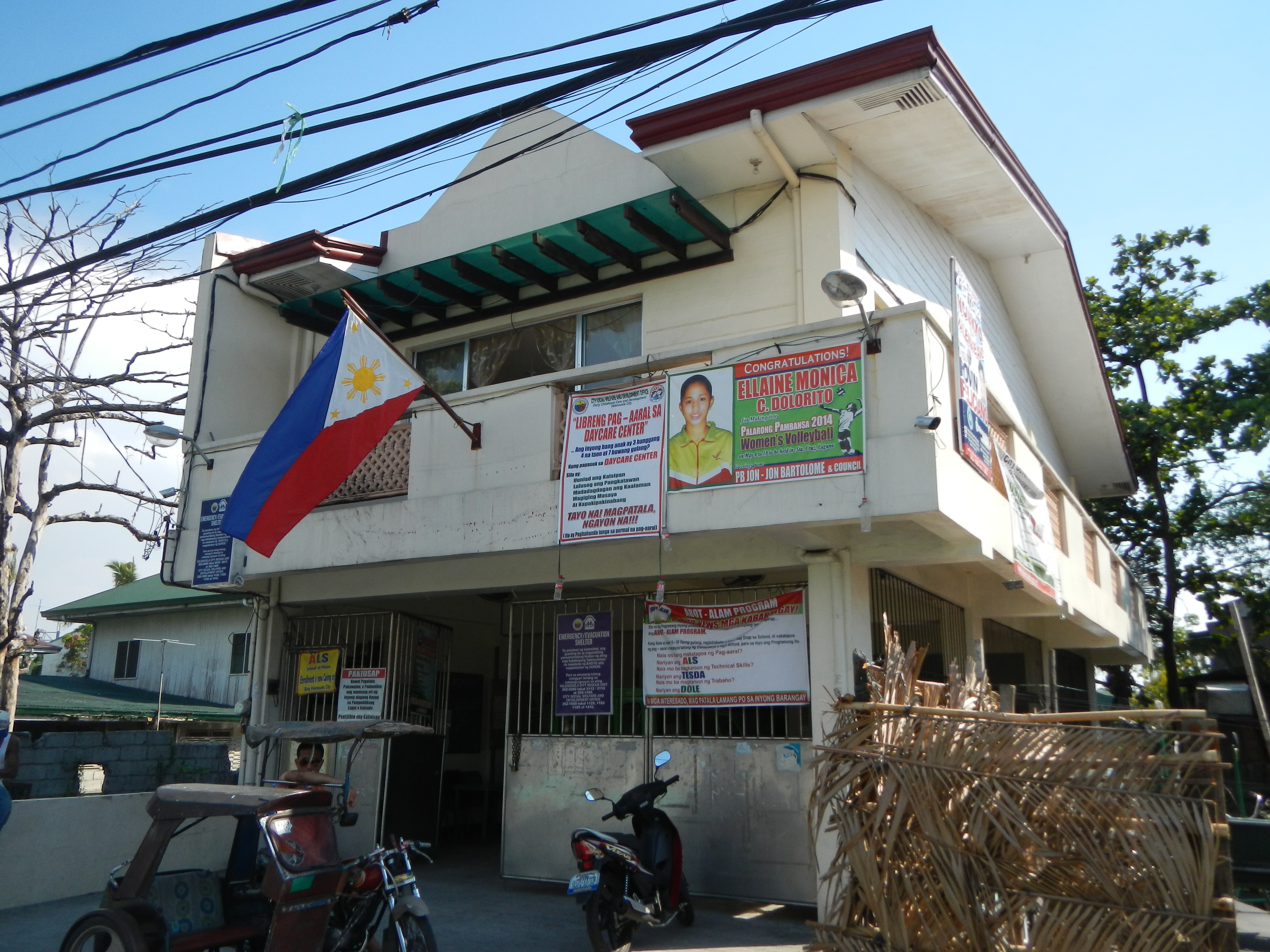
Bisig barangay hall

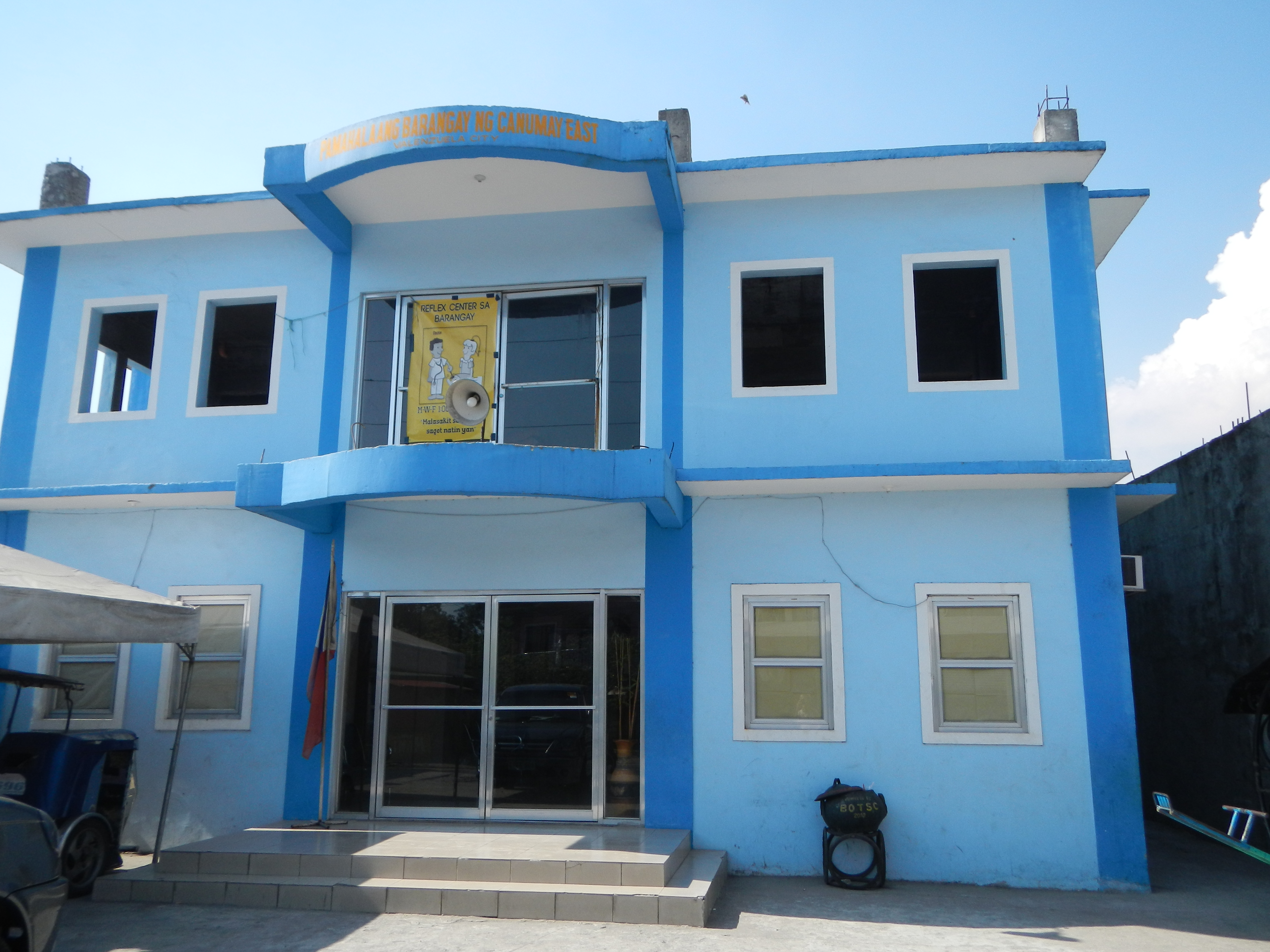
Canumay East barangay hall

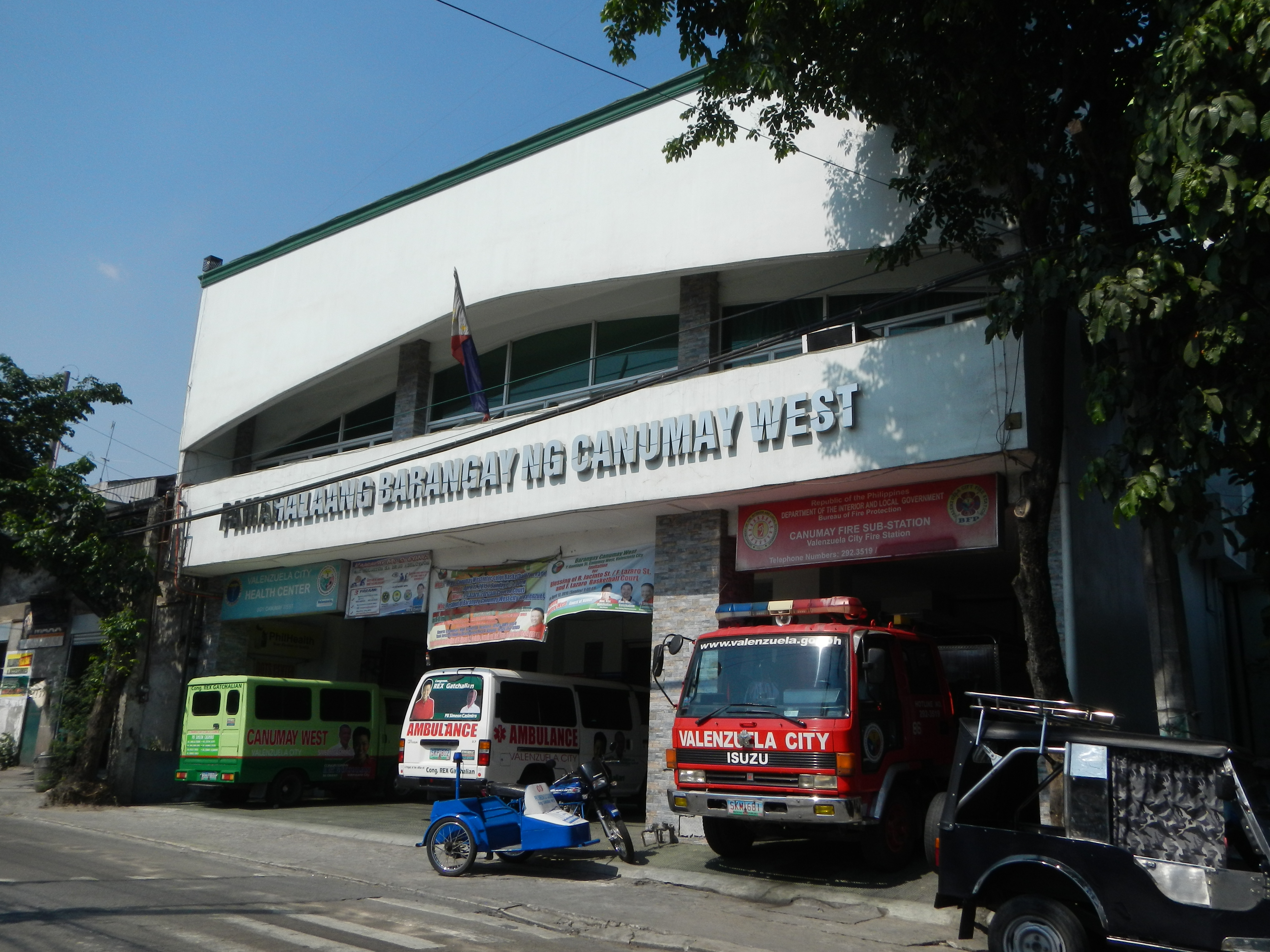
Canumay West barangay hall

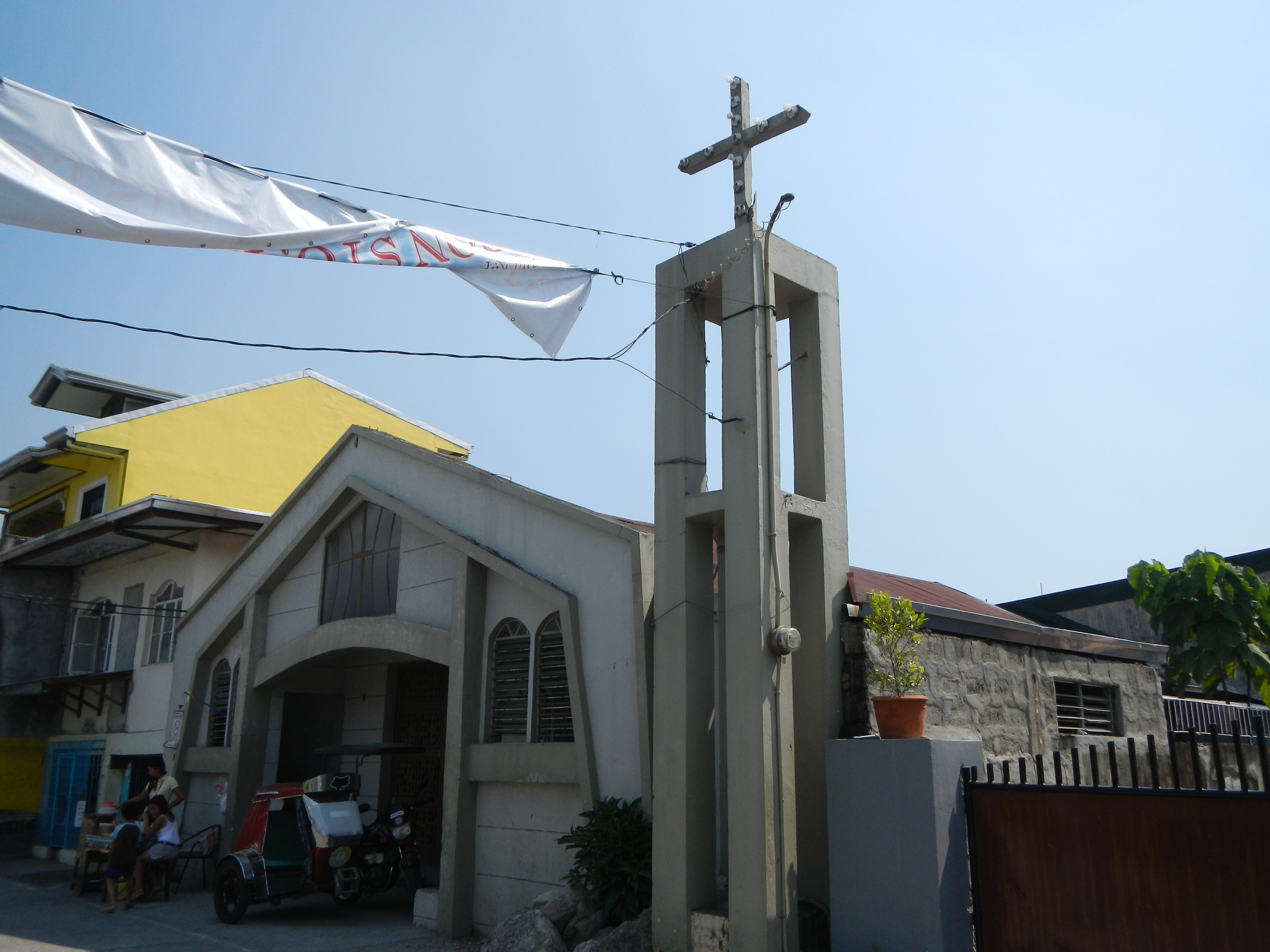
Visita Santo Cristo in Coloong

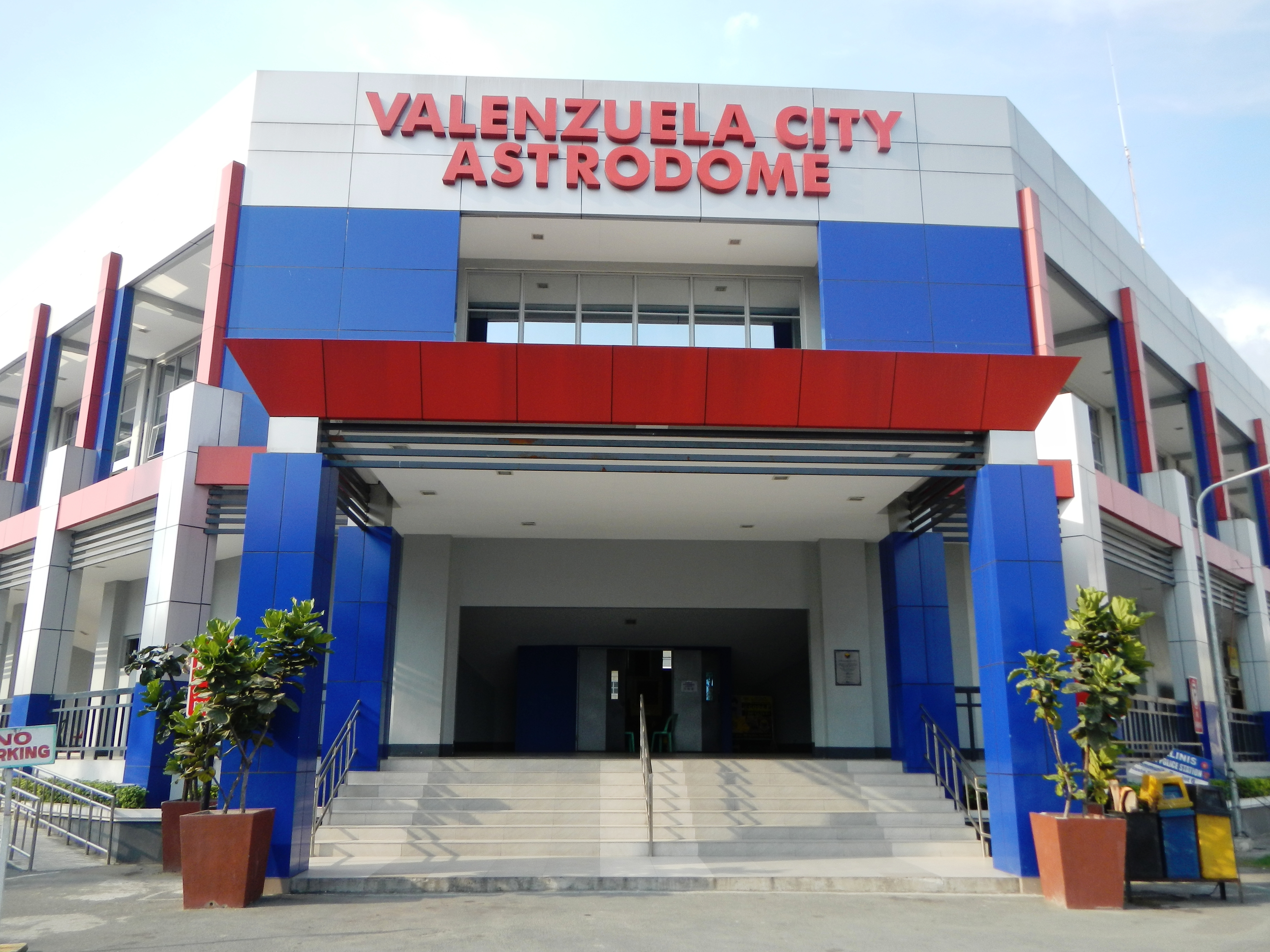
Valenzuela City Astrodome in Dalandanan

Gen. T. de Leon National High School façade

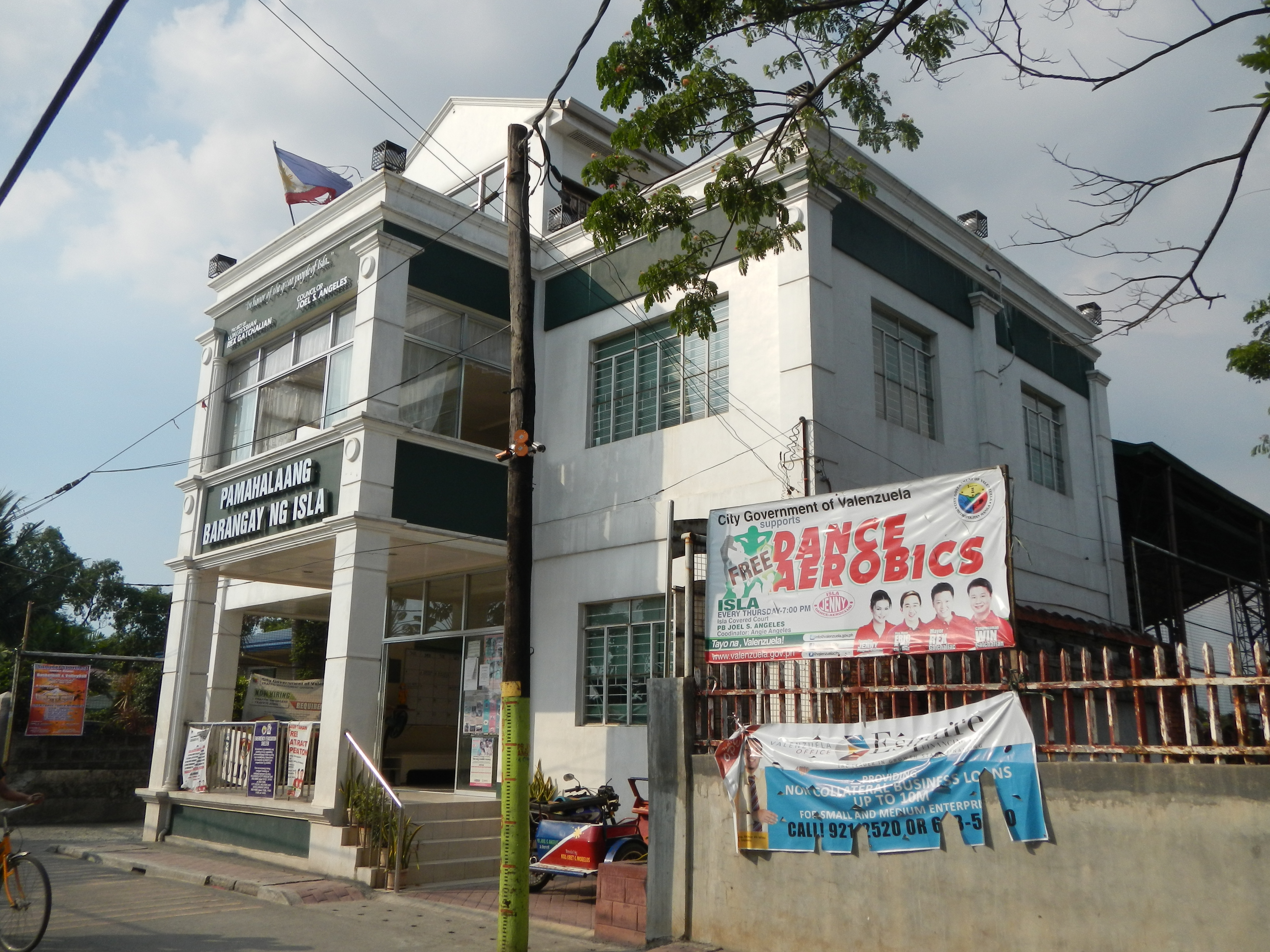
Isla barangay hall

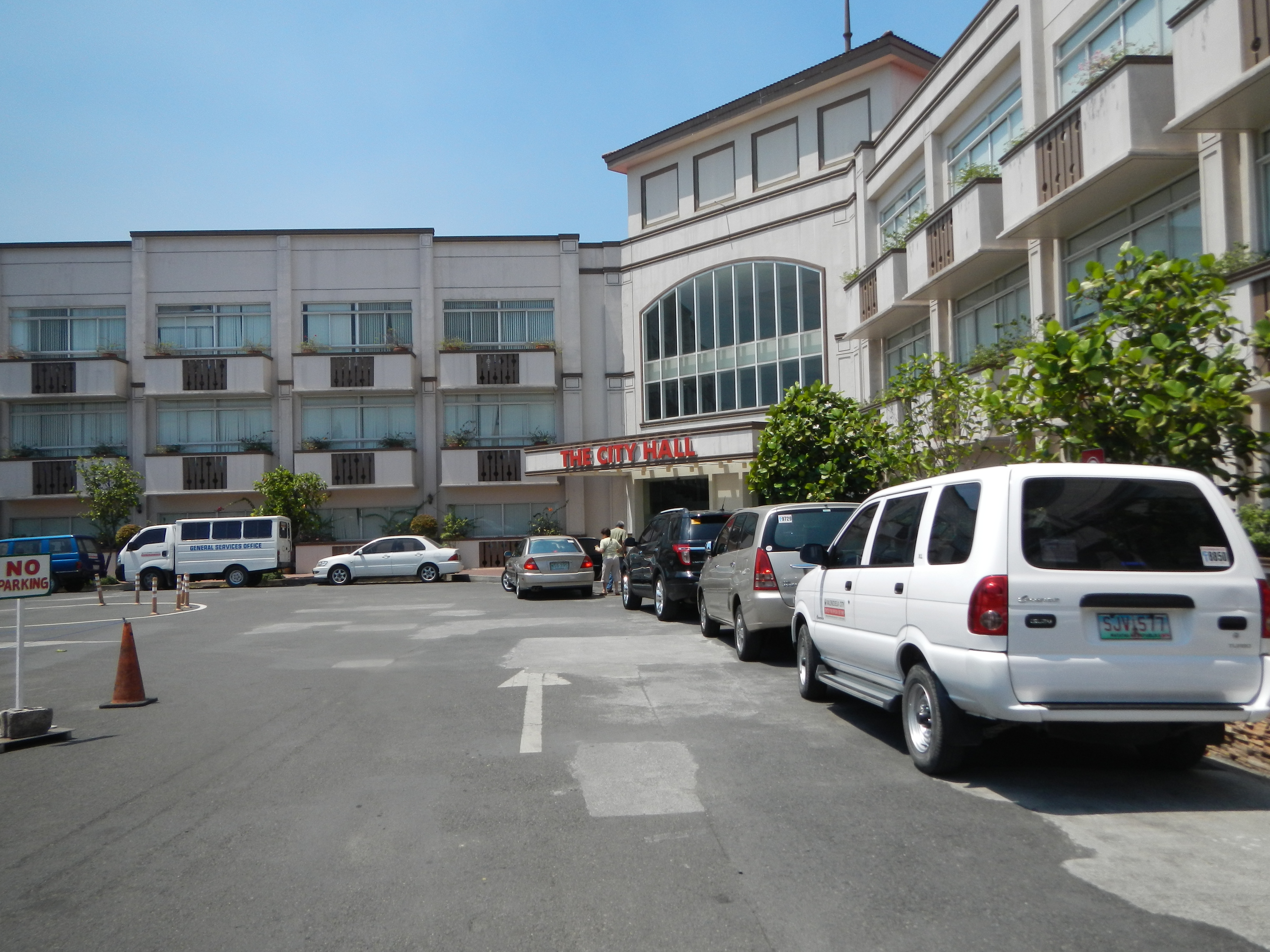
New Valenzuela City Hall building in Karuhatan

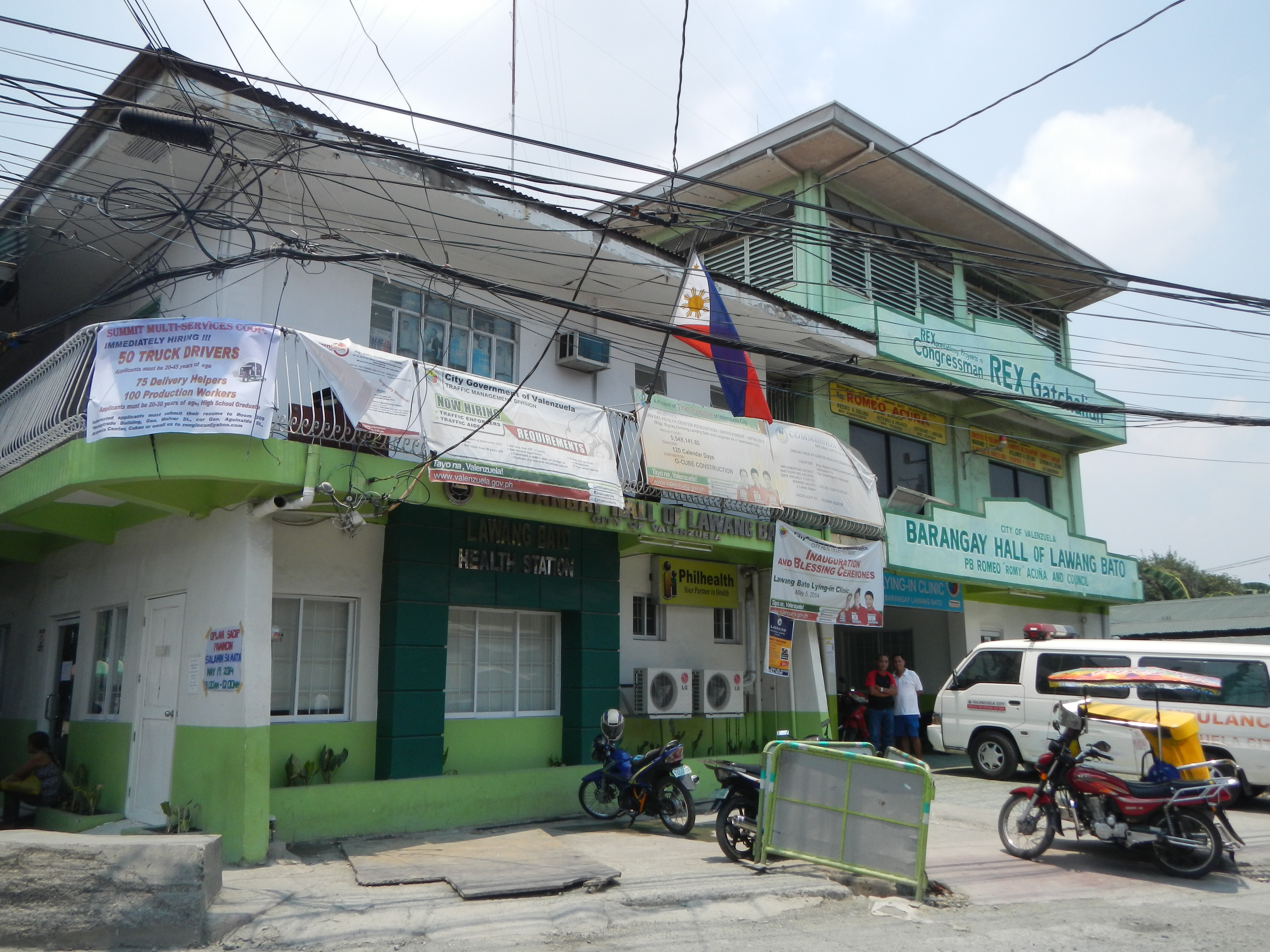
Lawang Bato barangay hall

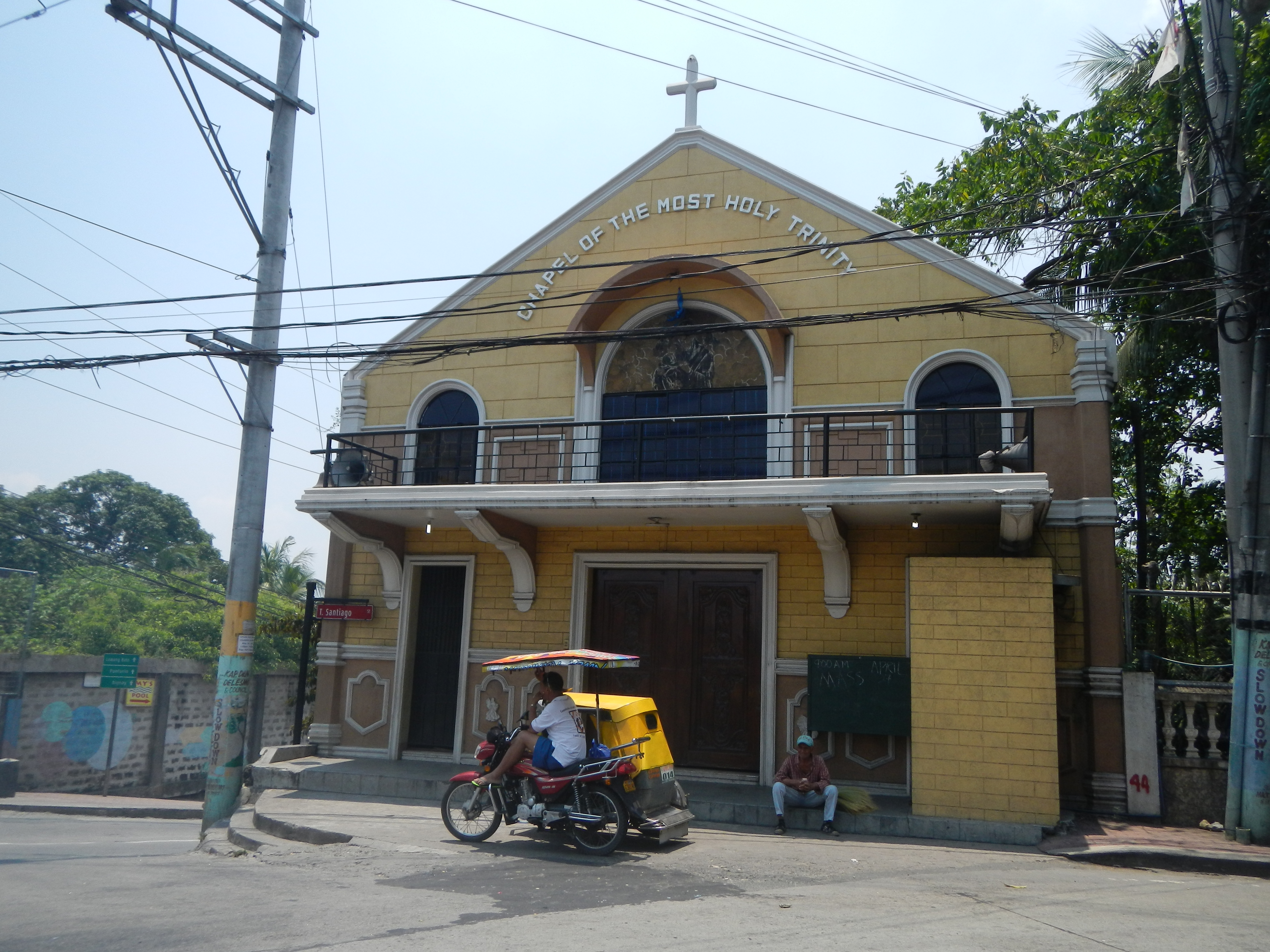
Chapel of the Most Holy Trinity in Lingunan

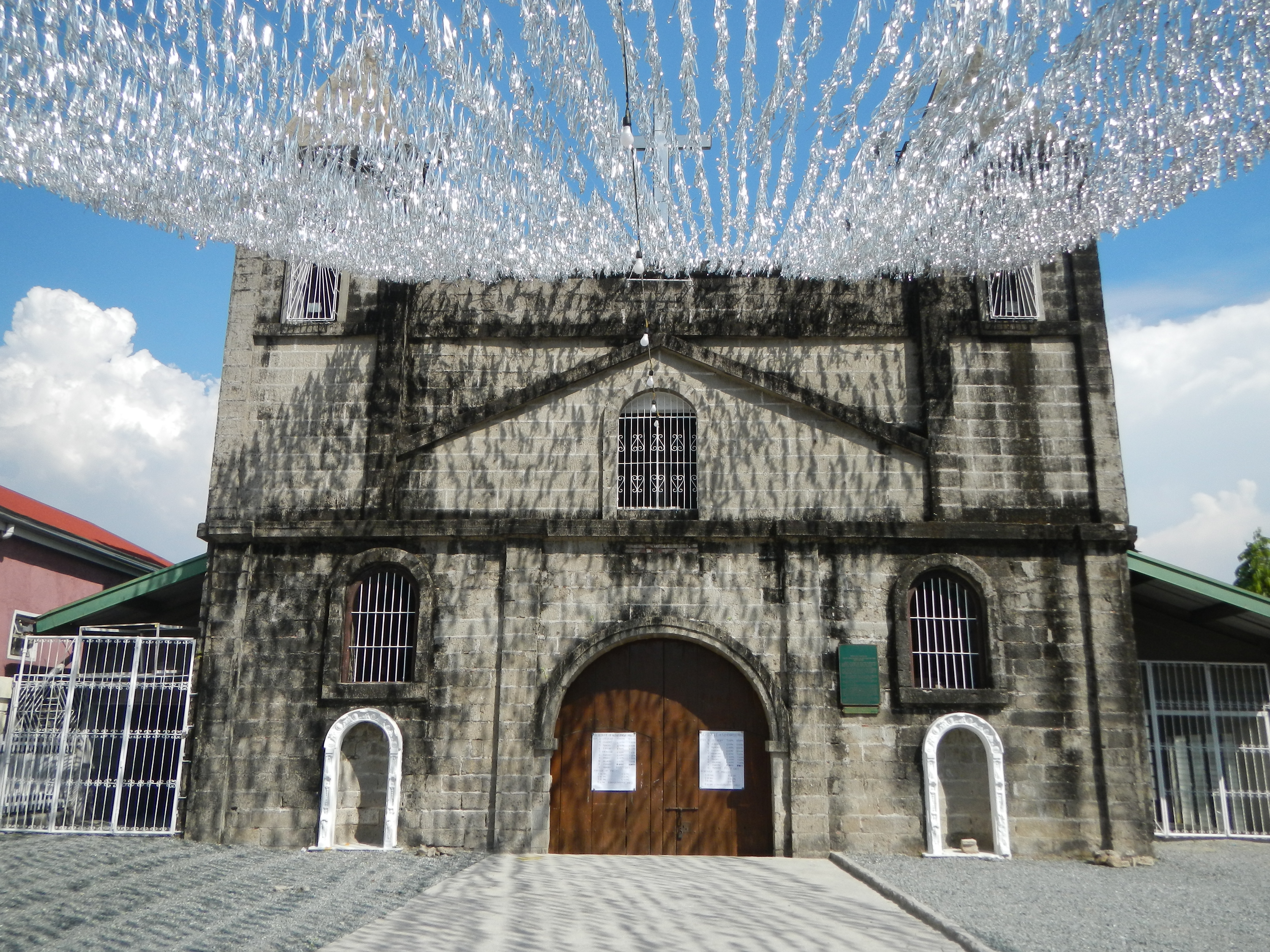
San Roque Church in Mabolo

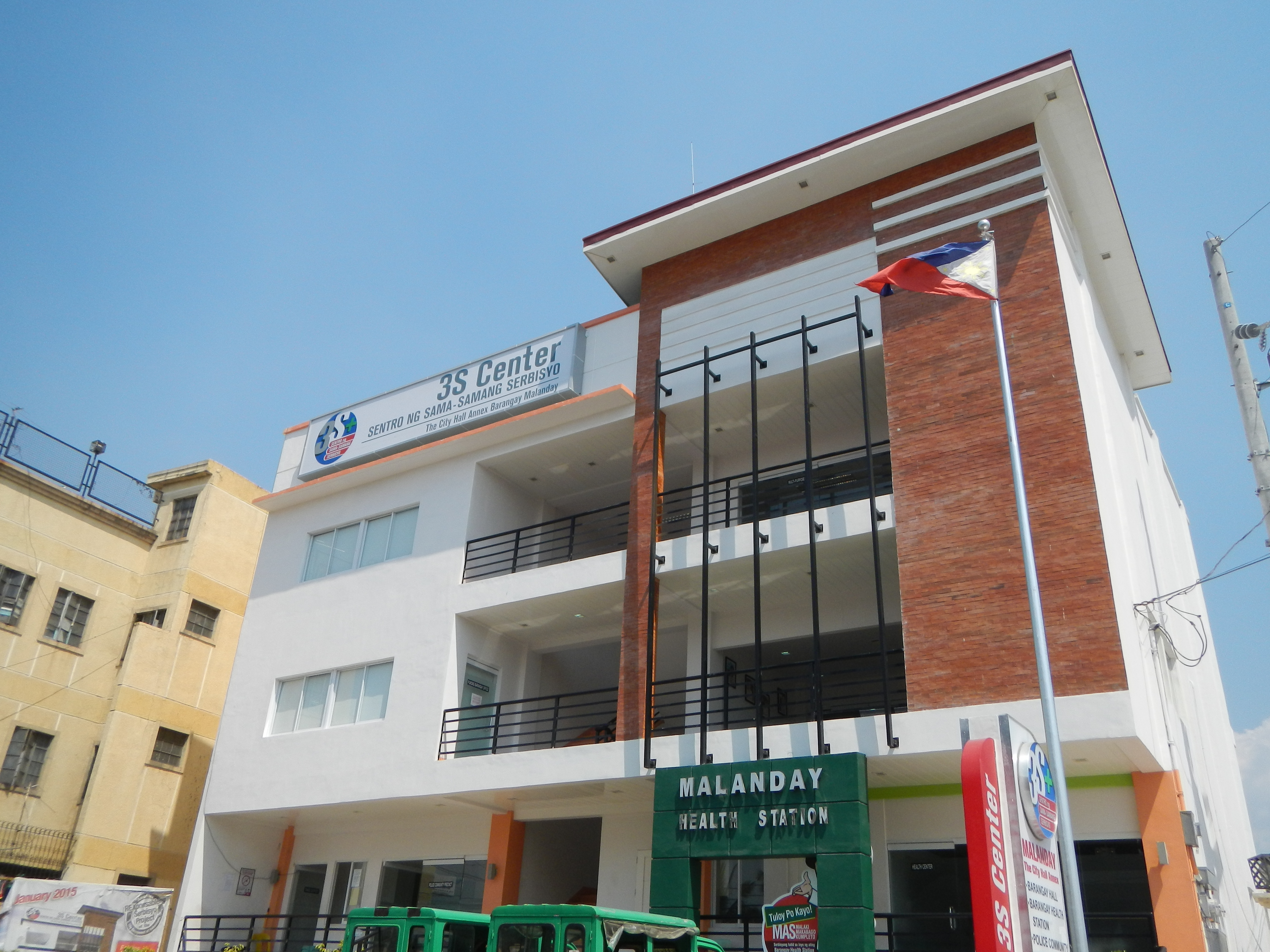
Malanday barangay hall

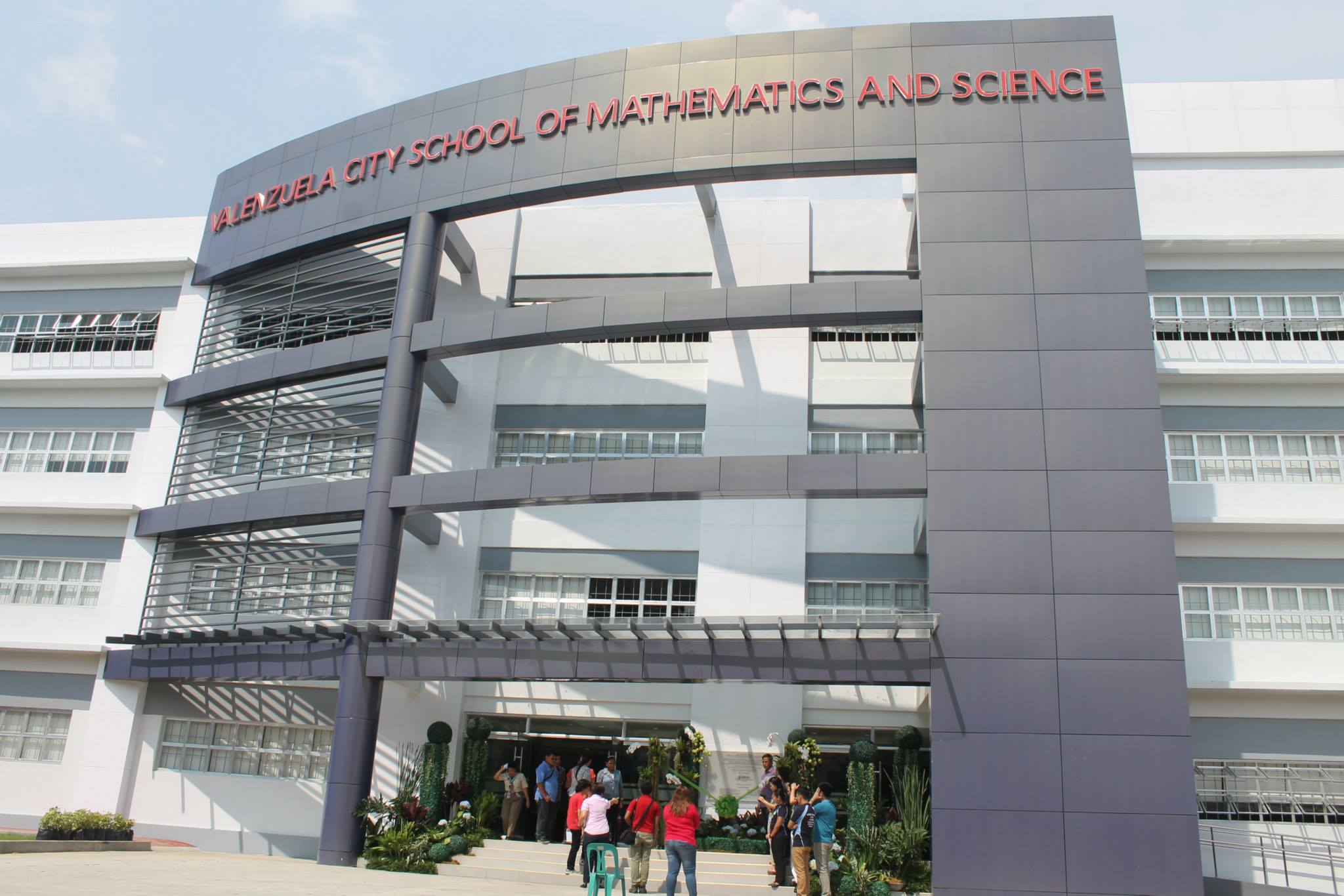
ValMaSci façade in Malinta

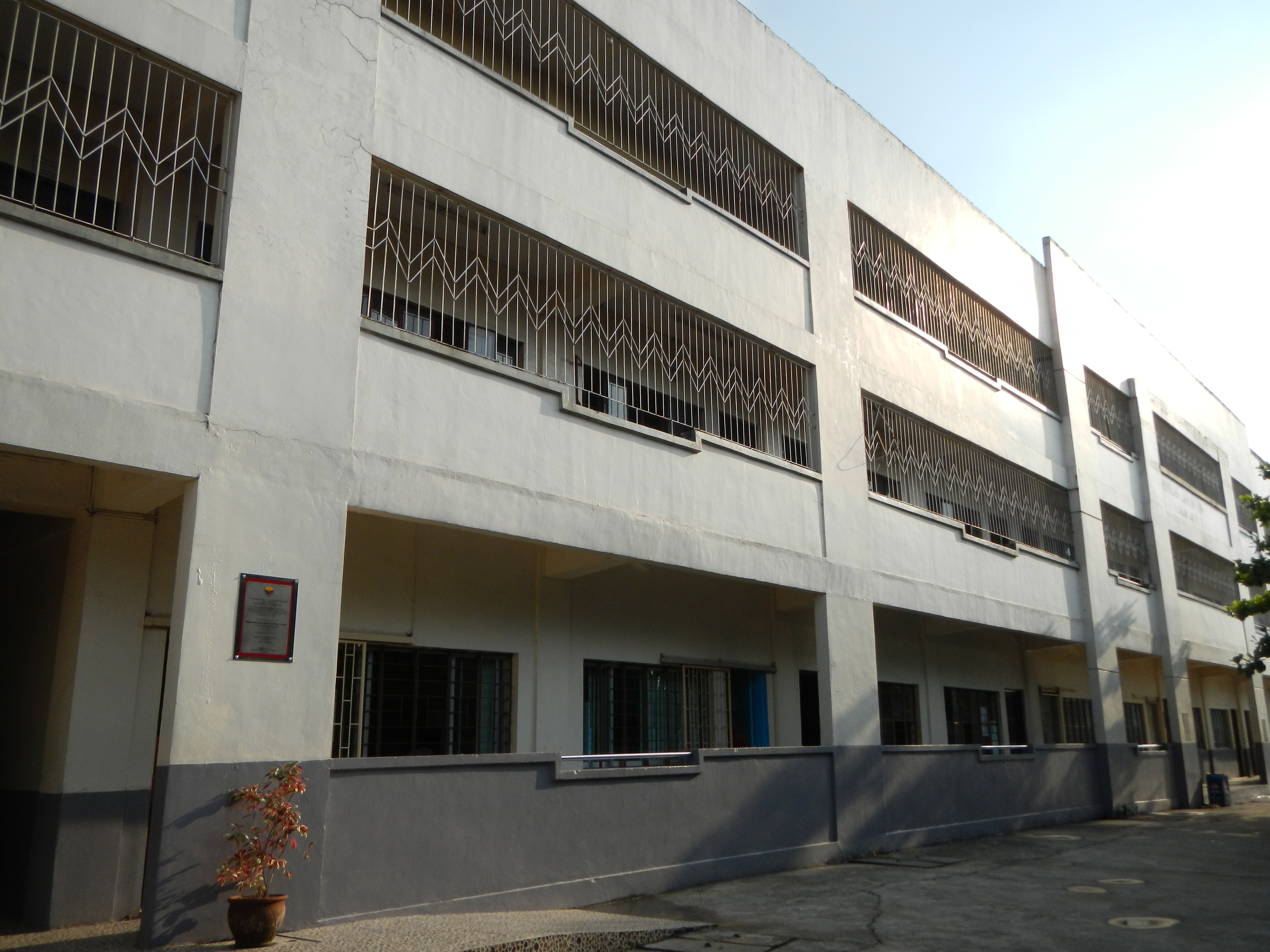
Mapulang Lupa National High School façade

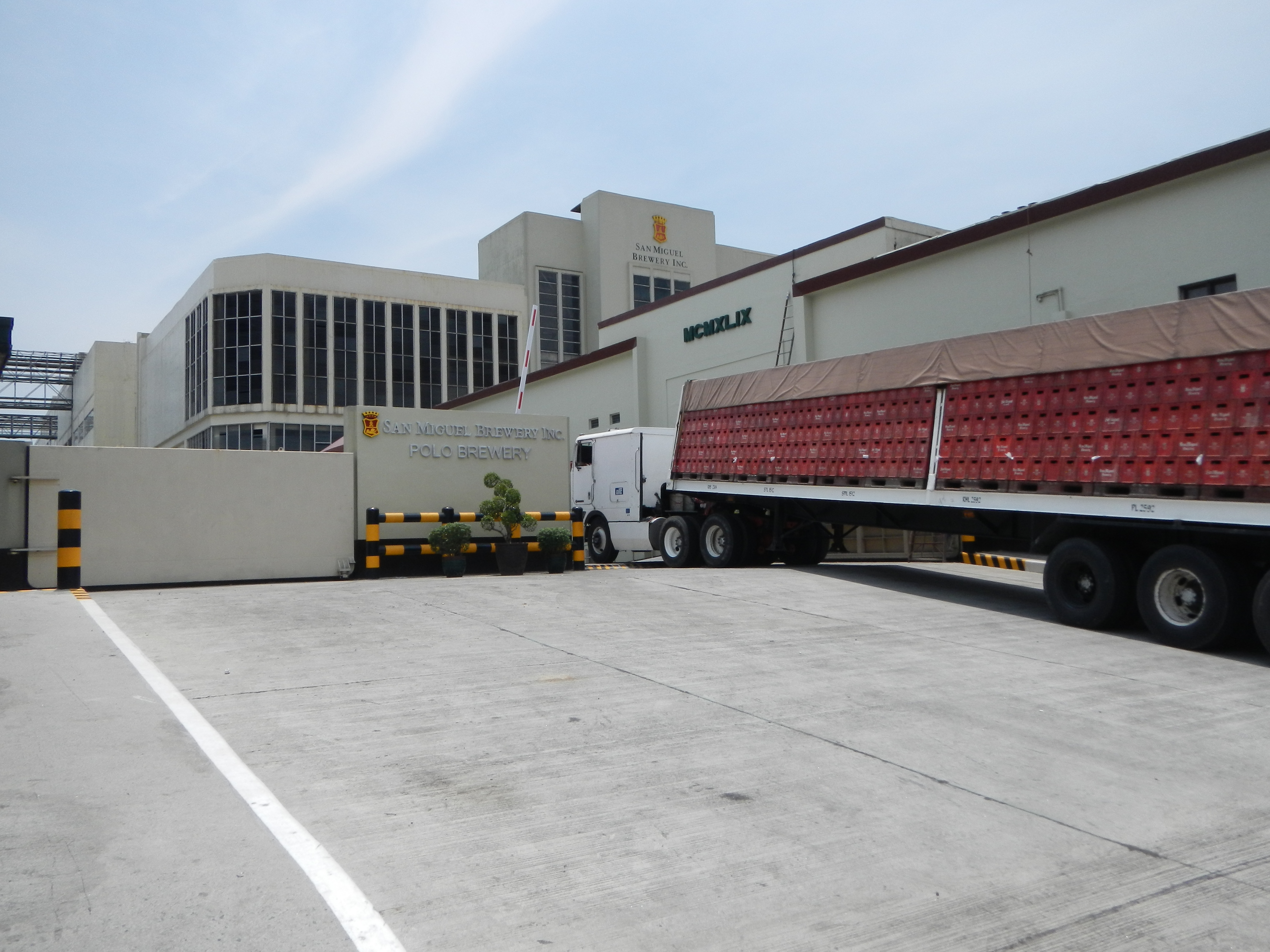
San Miguel Polo Brewery in Marulas

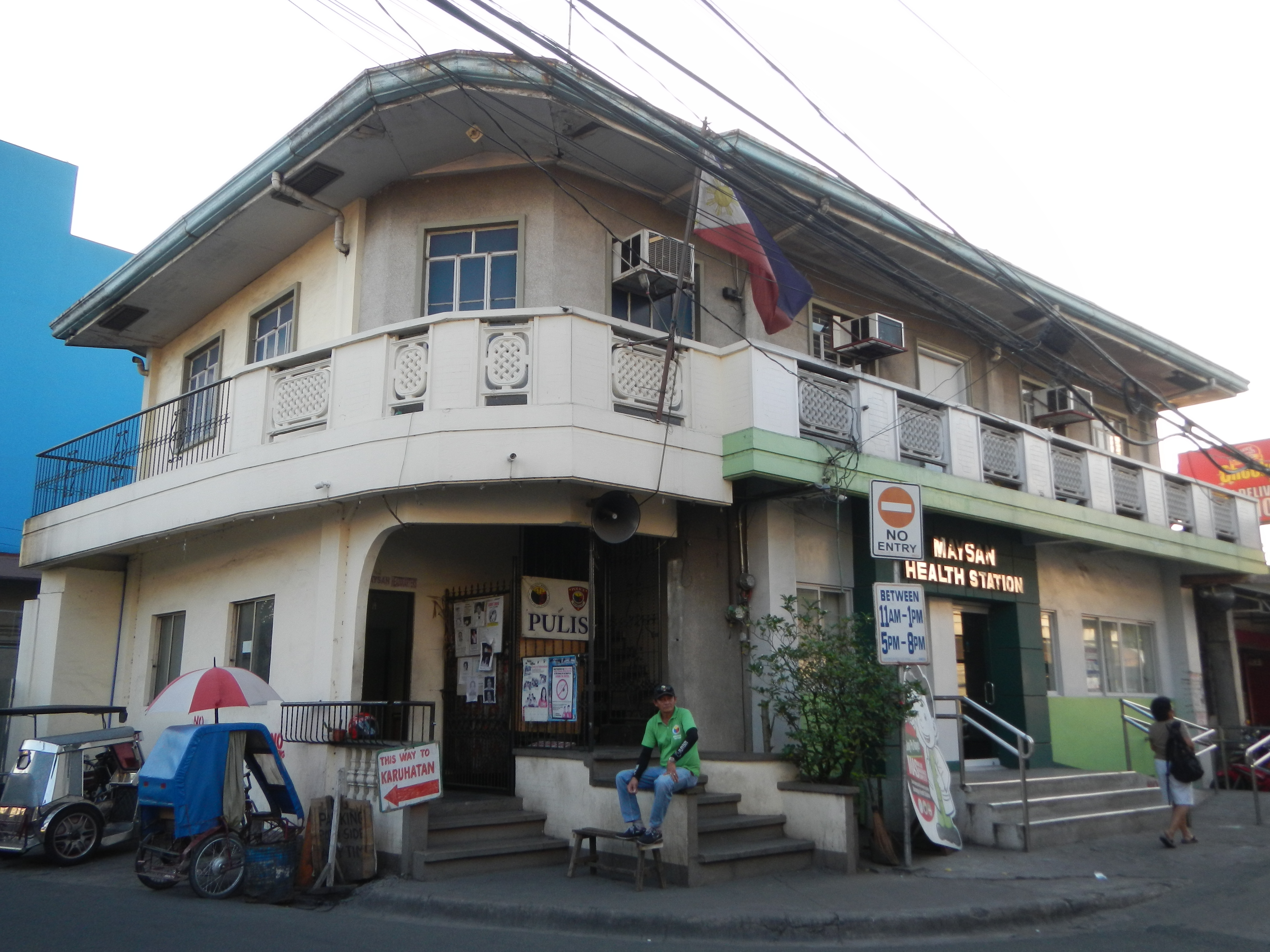
Maysan barangay hall

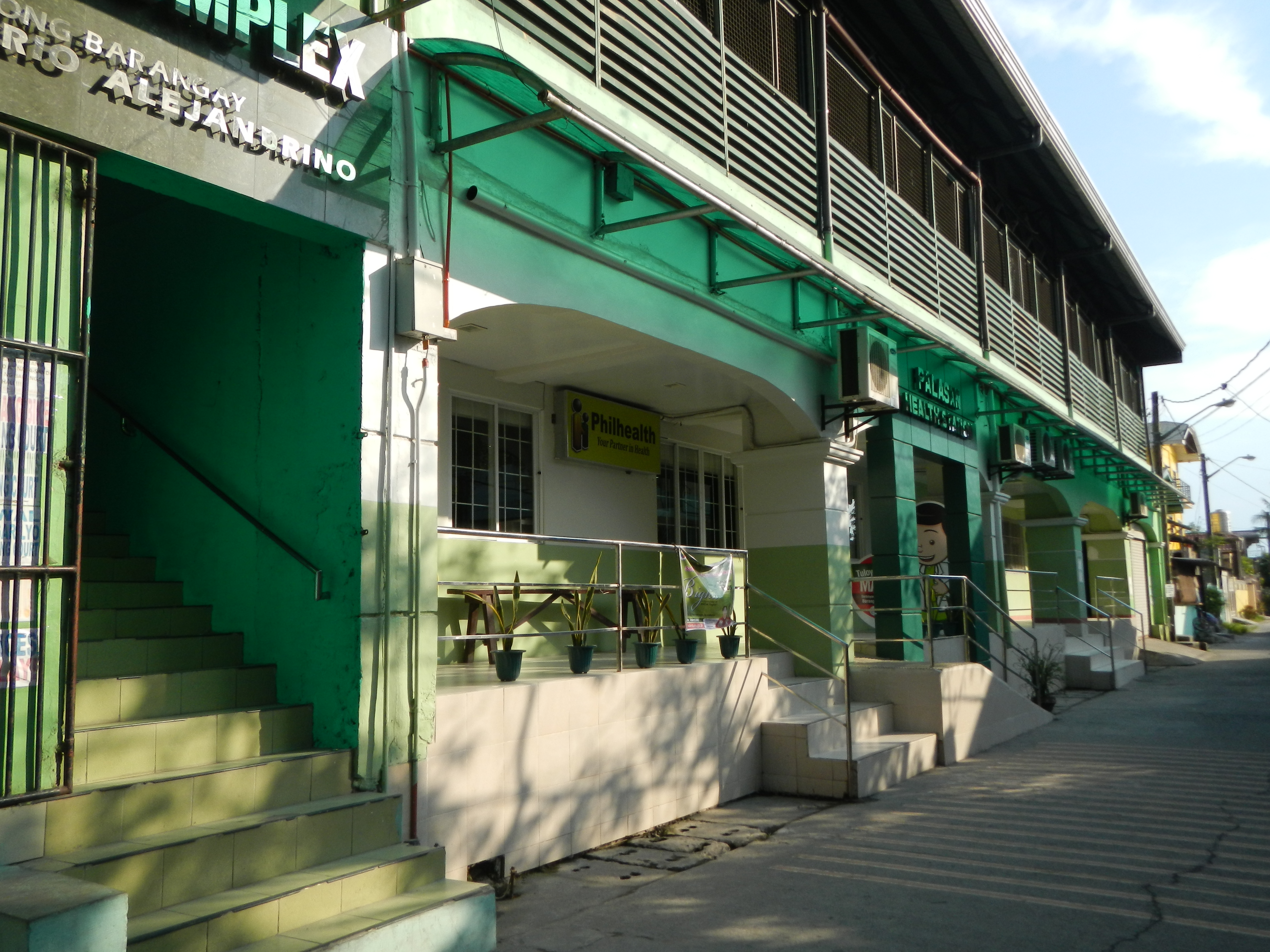
Palasan barangay hall

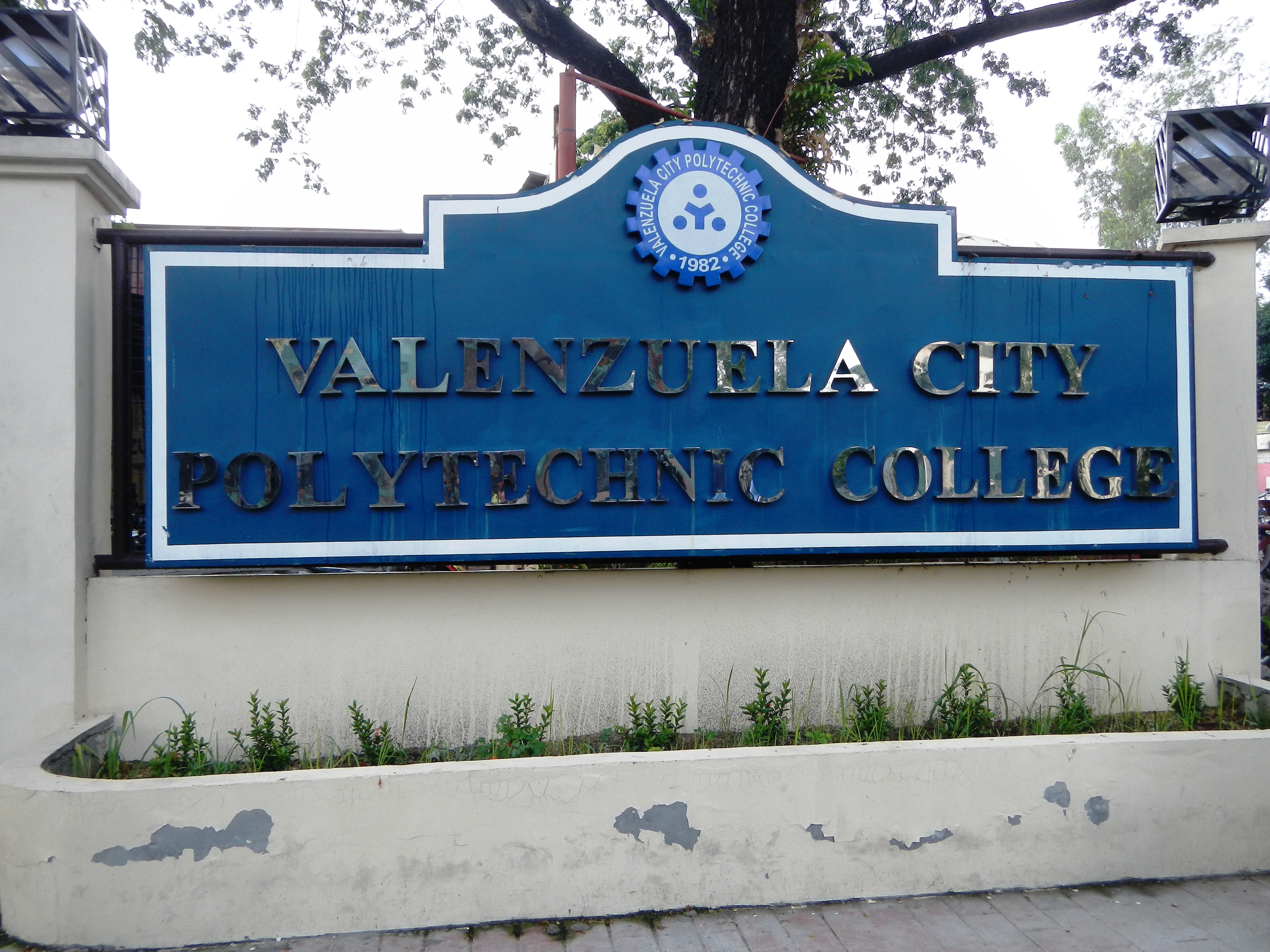
ValPoly entry marker in Parada

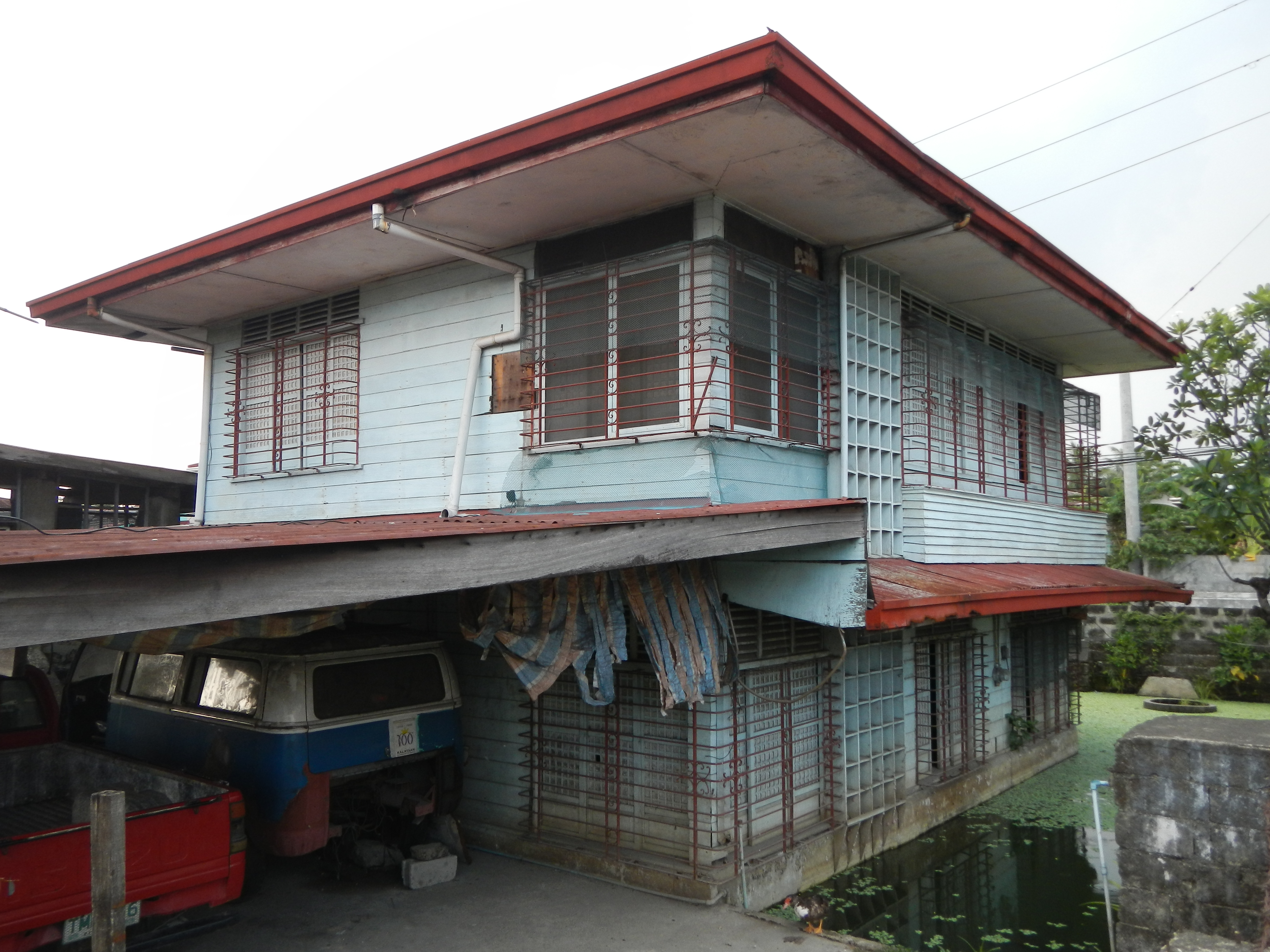
Pío Valenzuela ancestral house in Pariancillo Villa

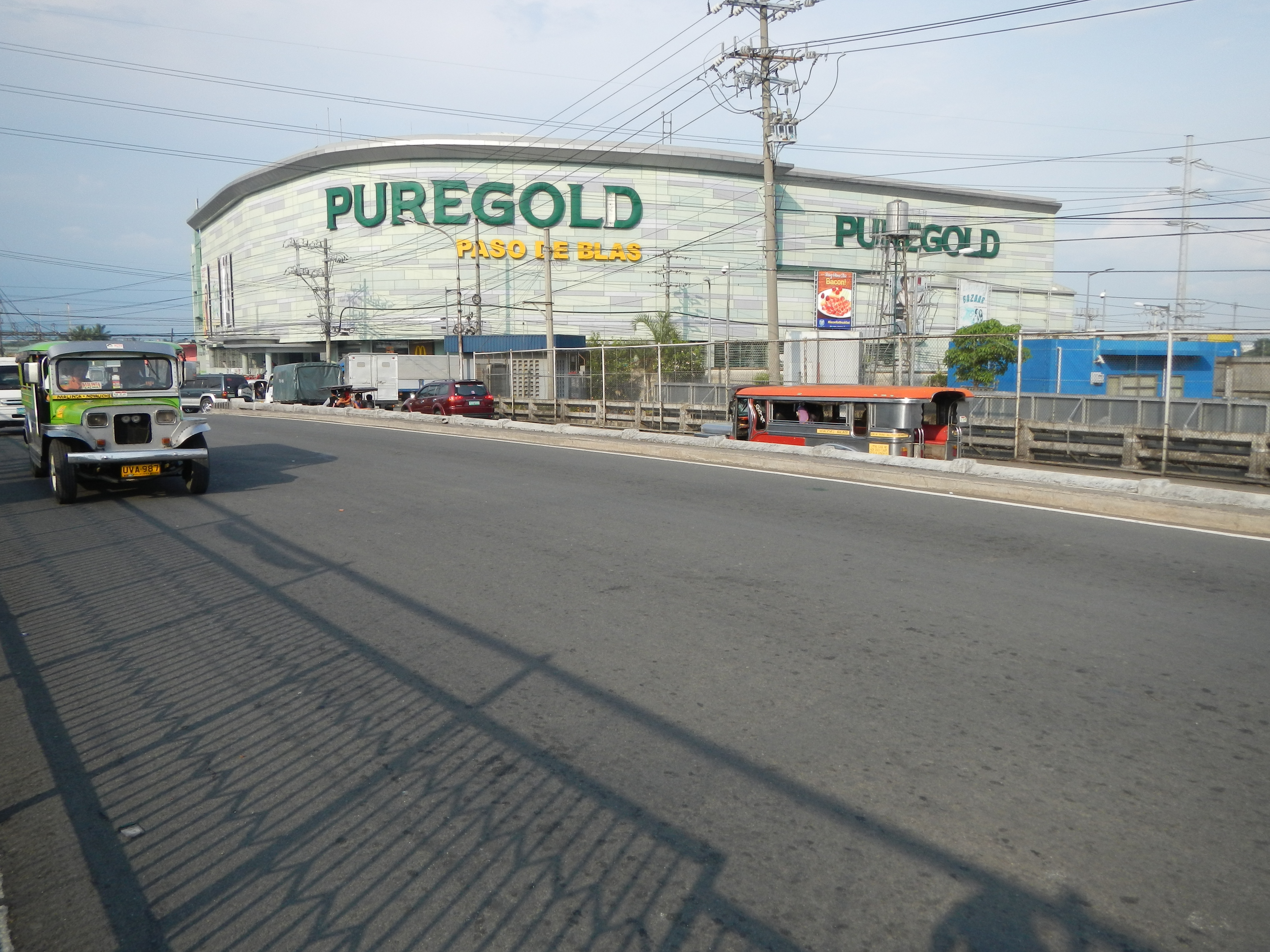
Paso de Blas Interchange (KM 15) of NLEX in Paso de Blas

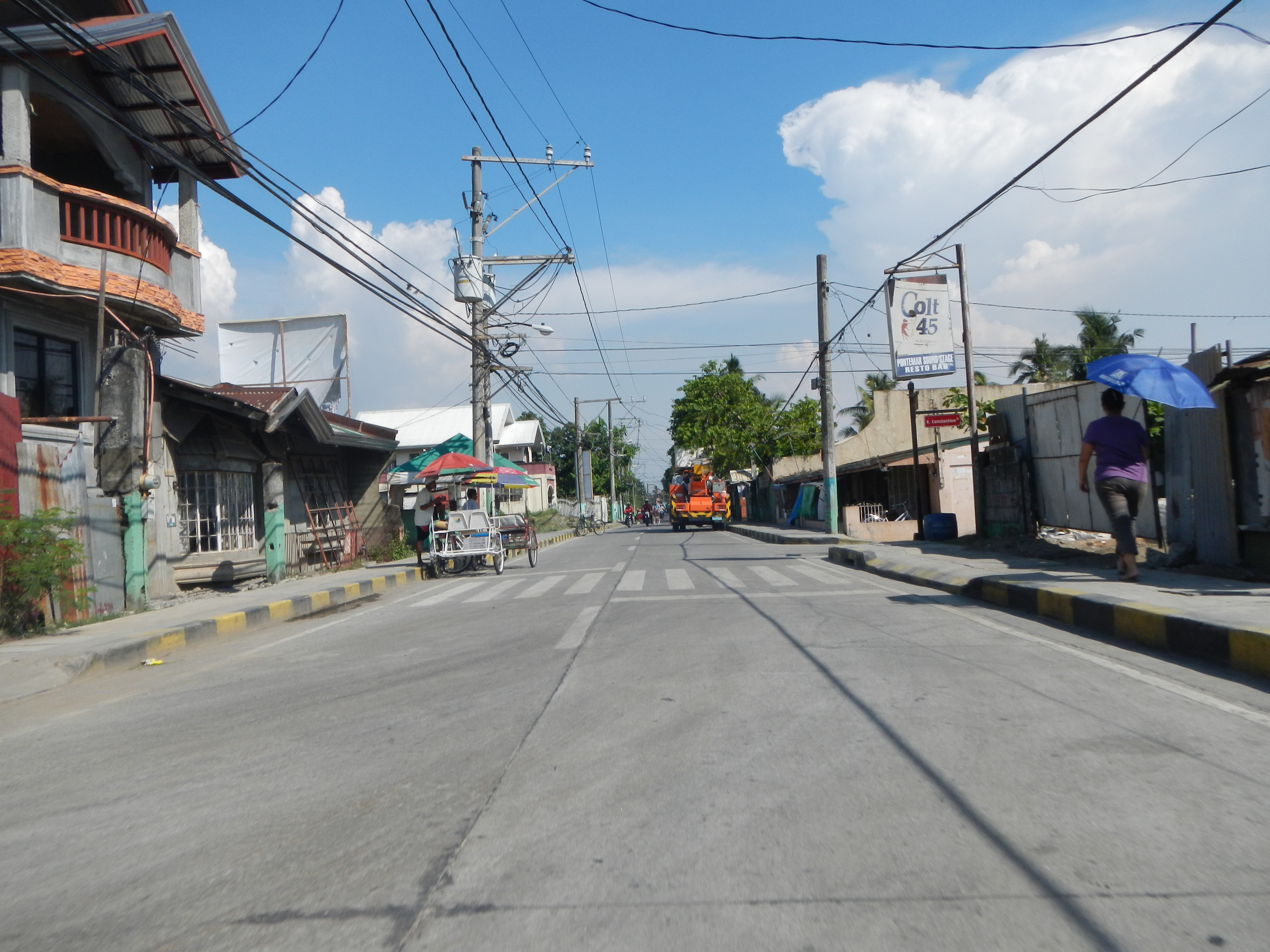
Pasolo Road

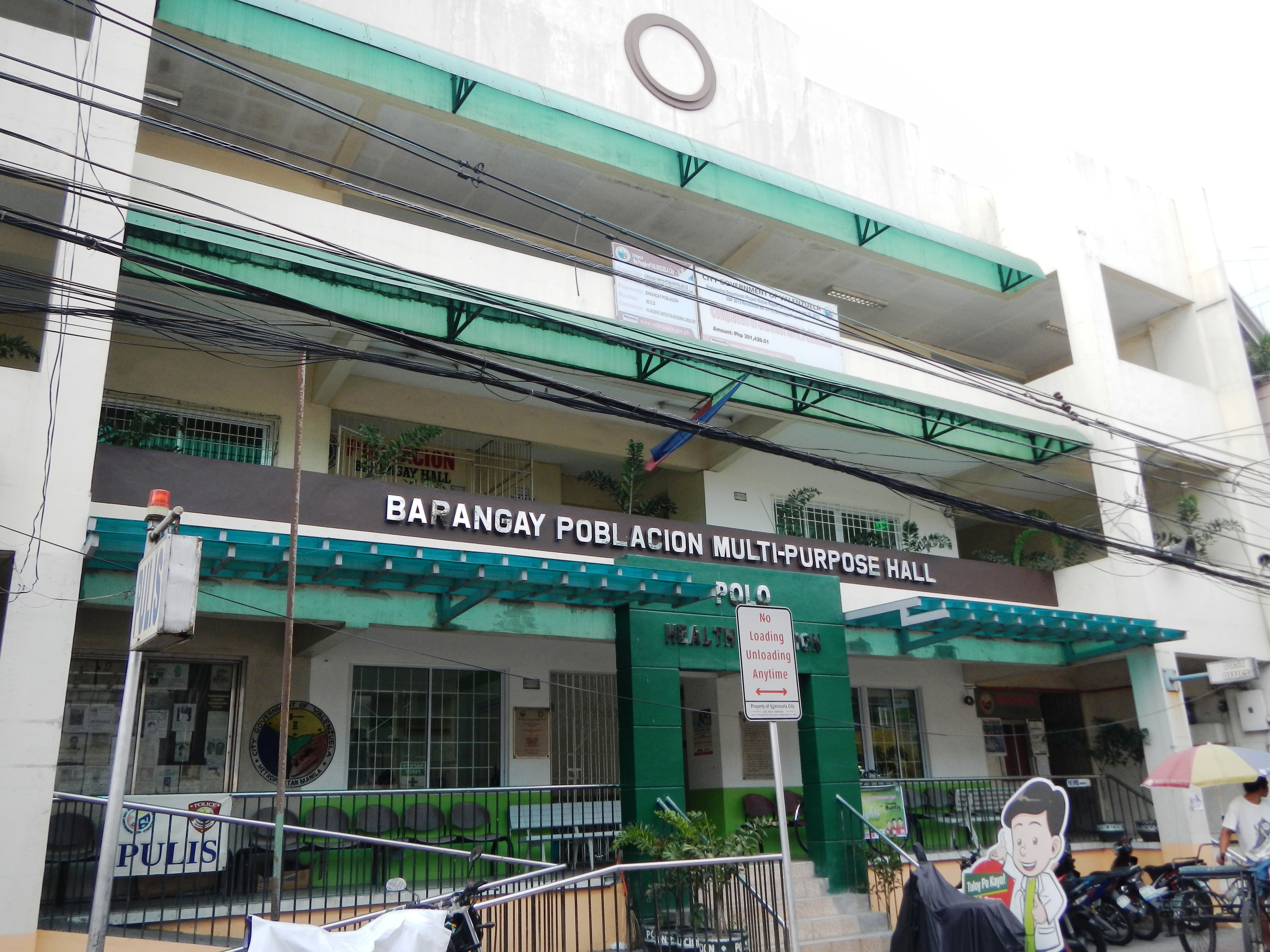
Poblacion barangay hall

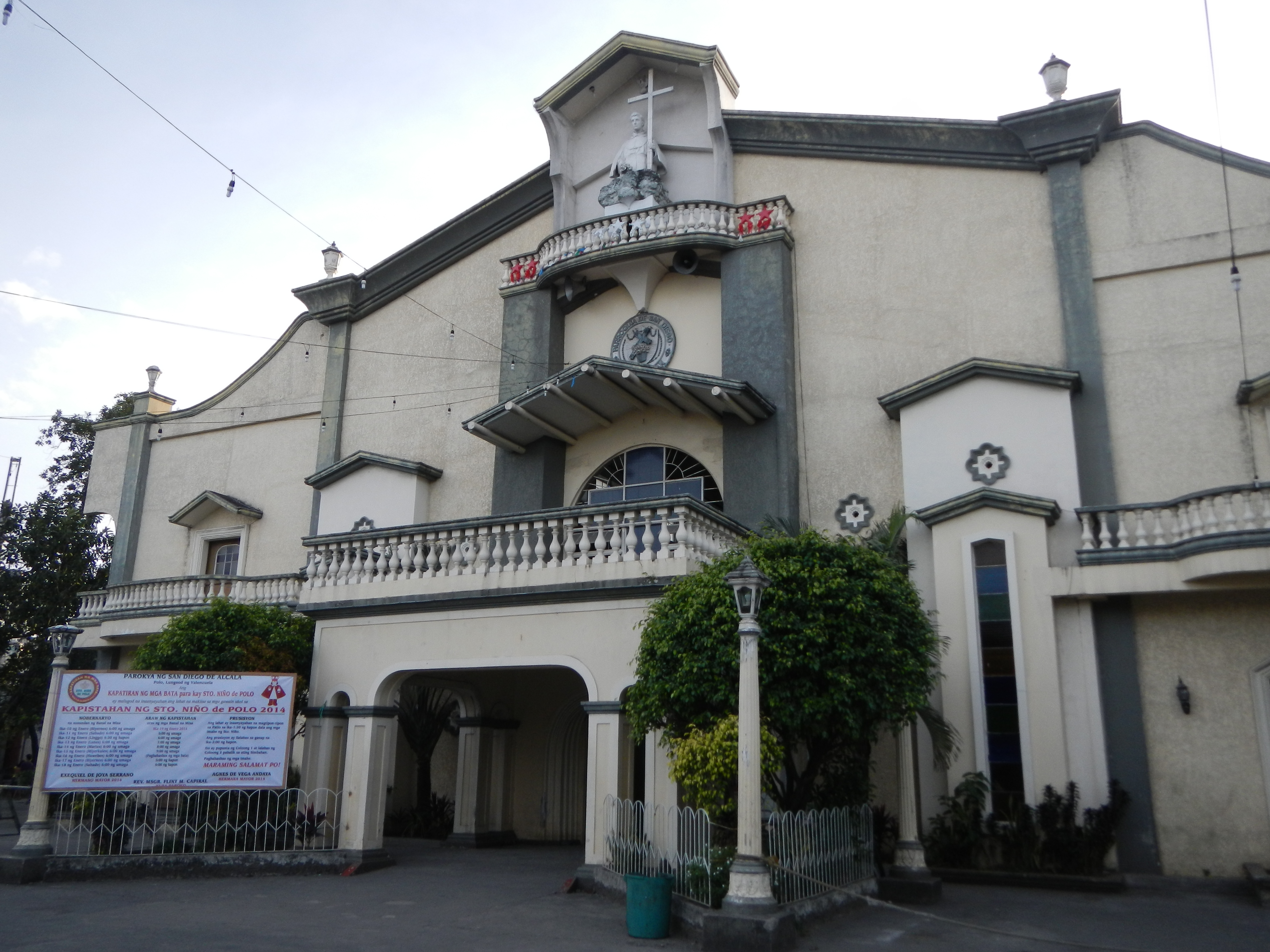
San Diego de Alcala Church in Polo

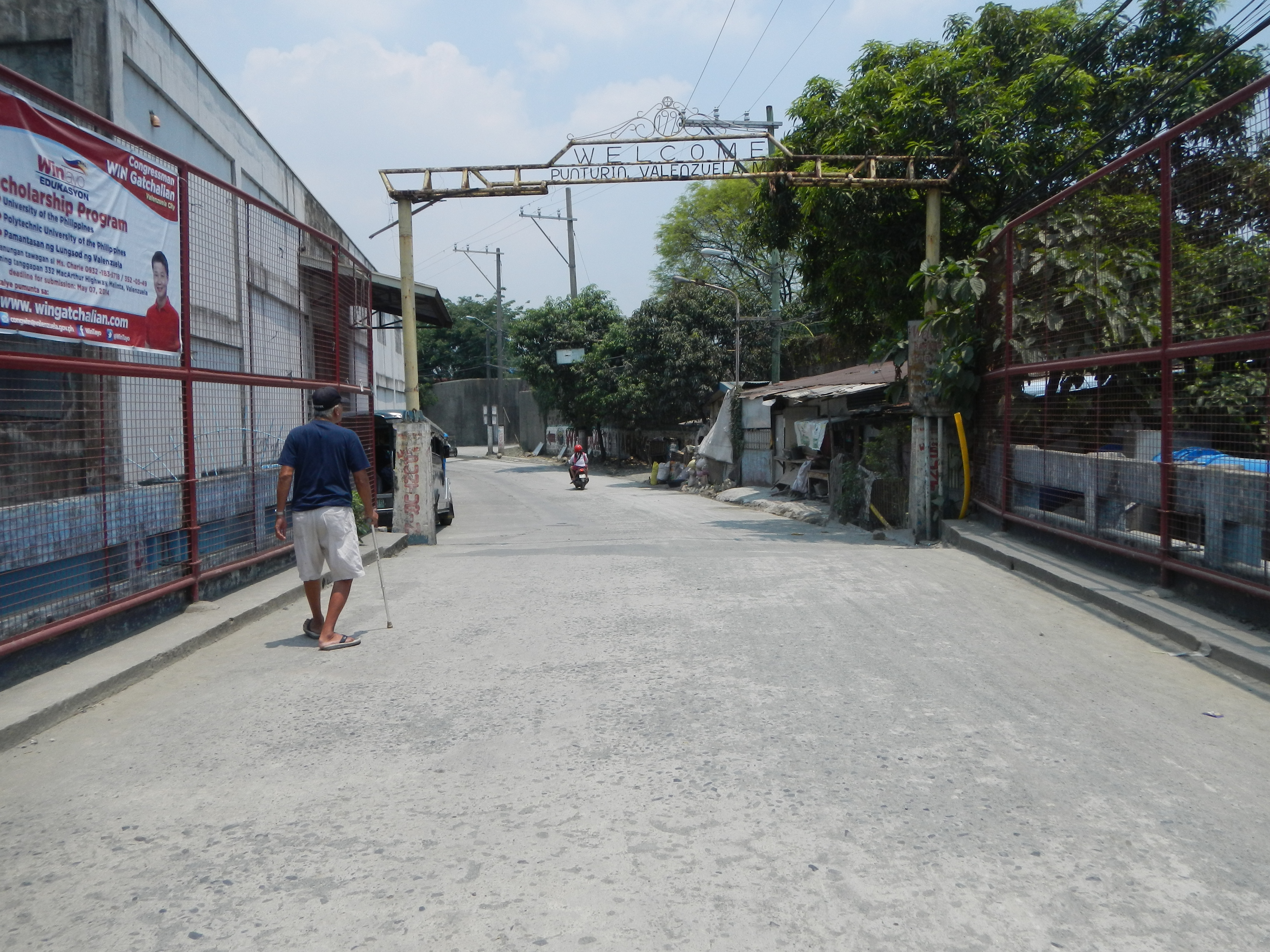
Punturin welcome arch

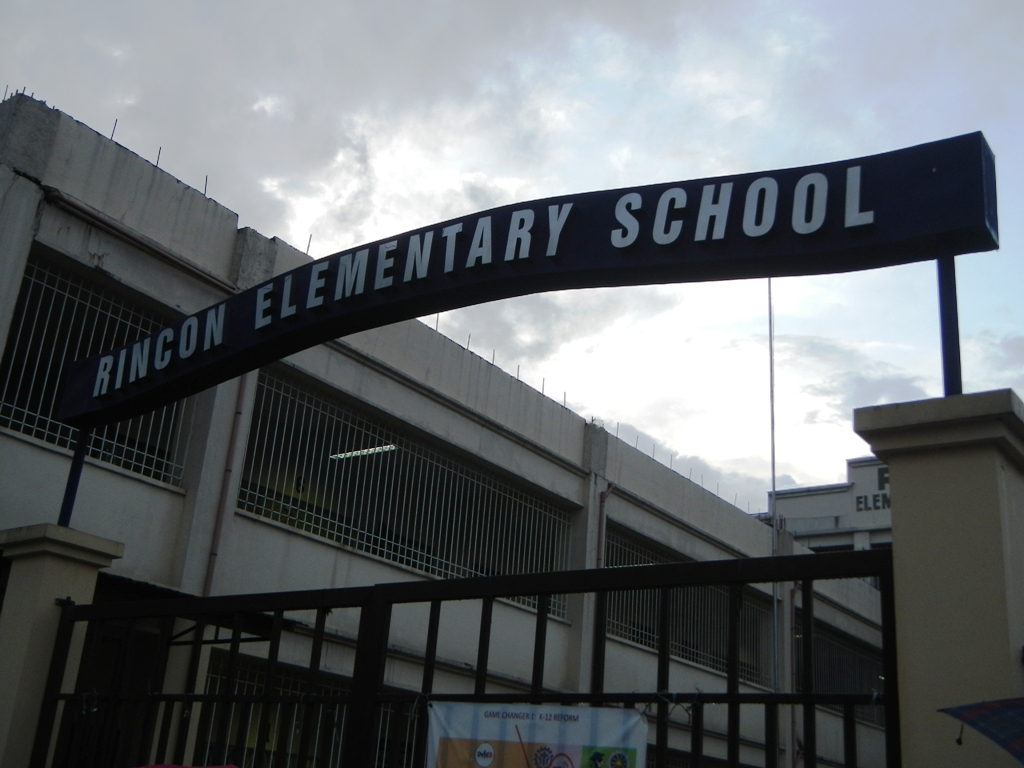
Rincon Elementary School

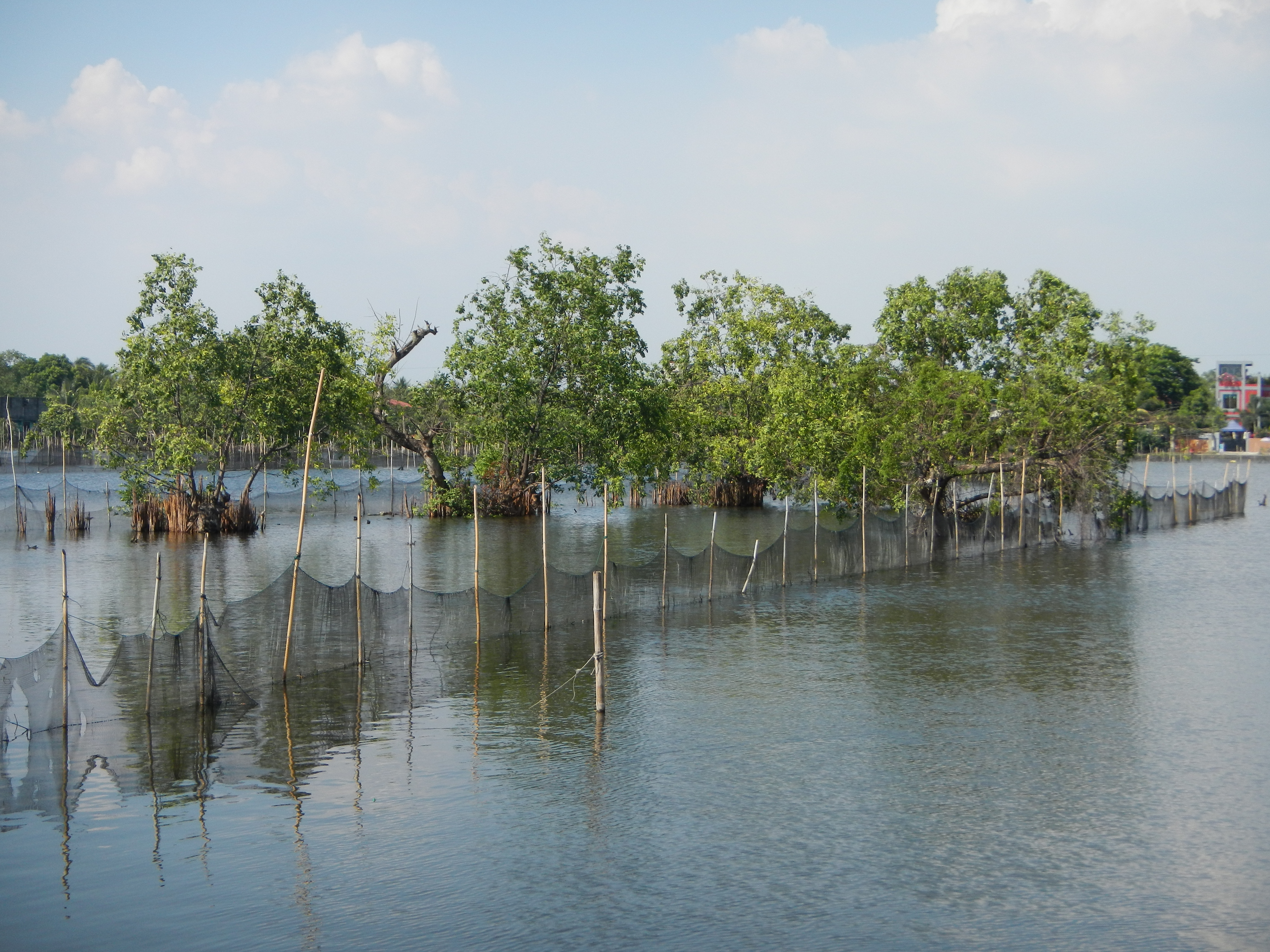
Tagalag fish ponds

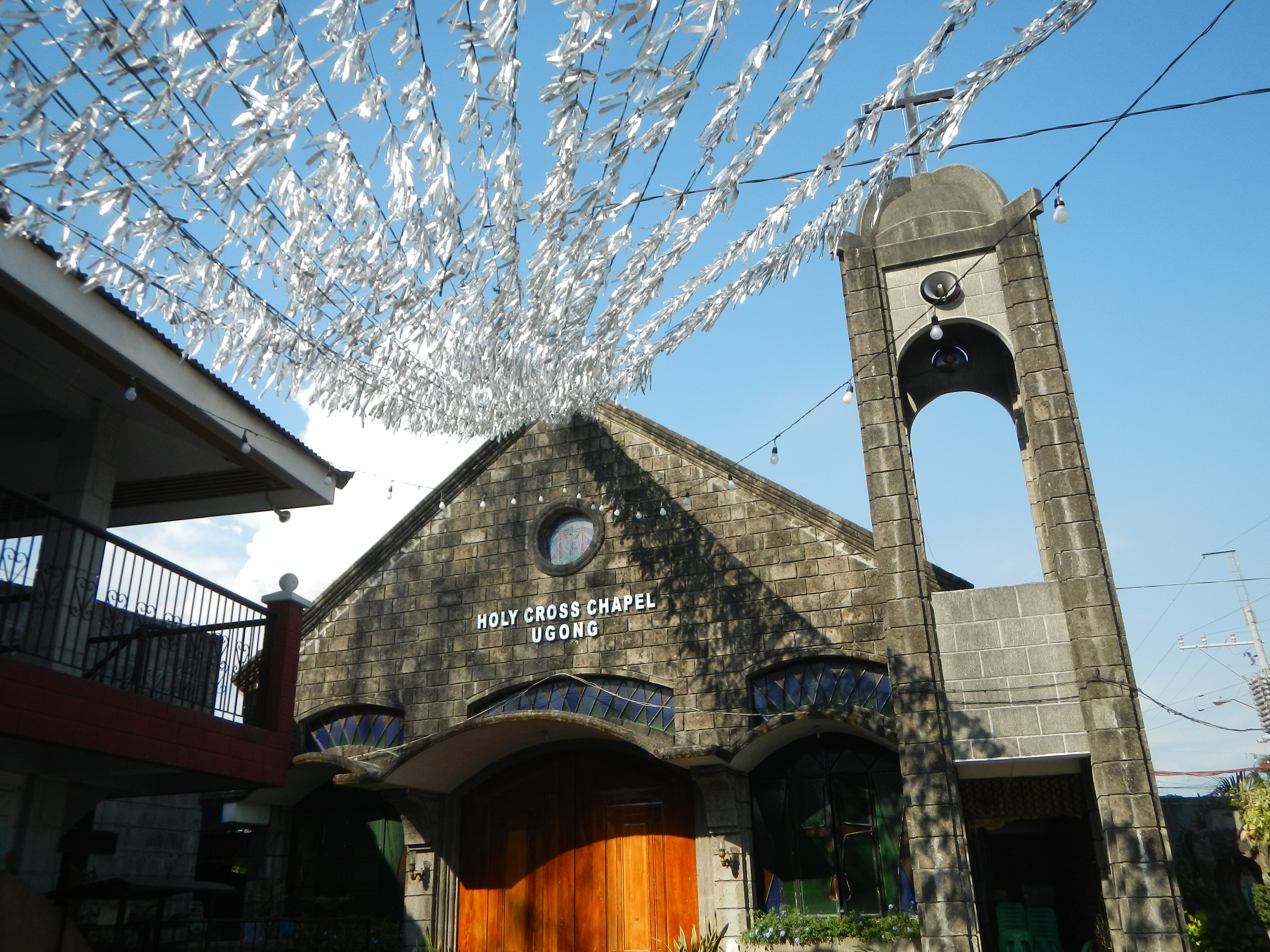
Holy Cross Chapel in Ugong

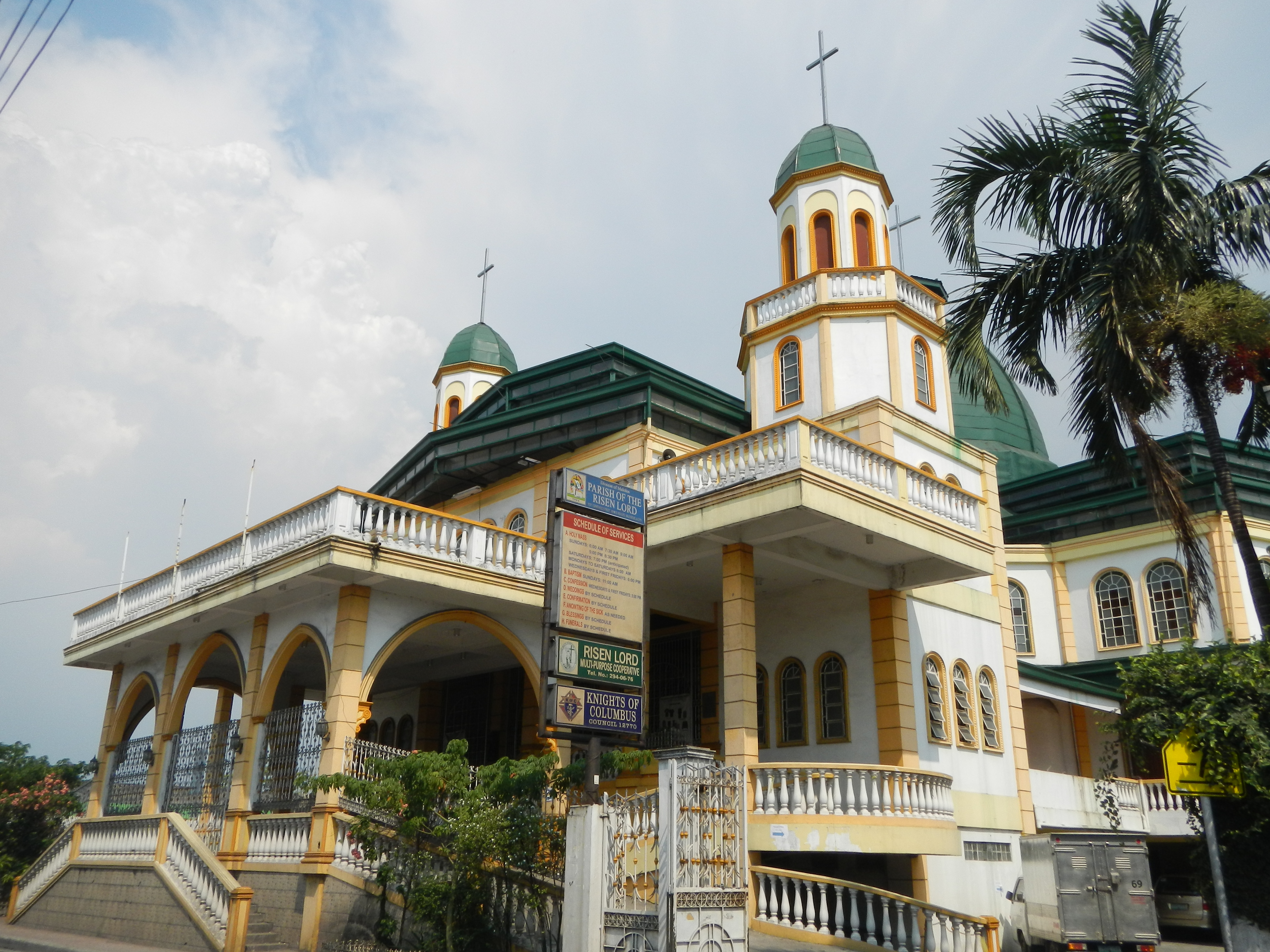
Risen Lord Parish in Veinte Reales

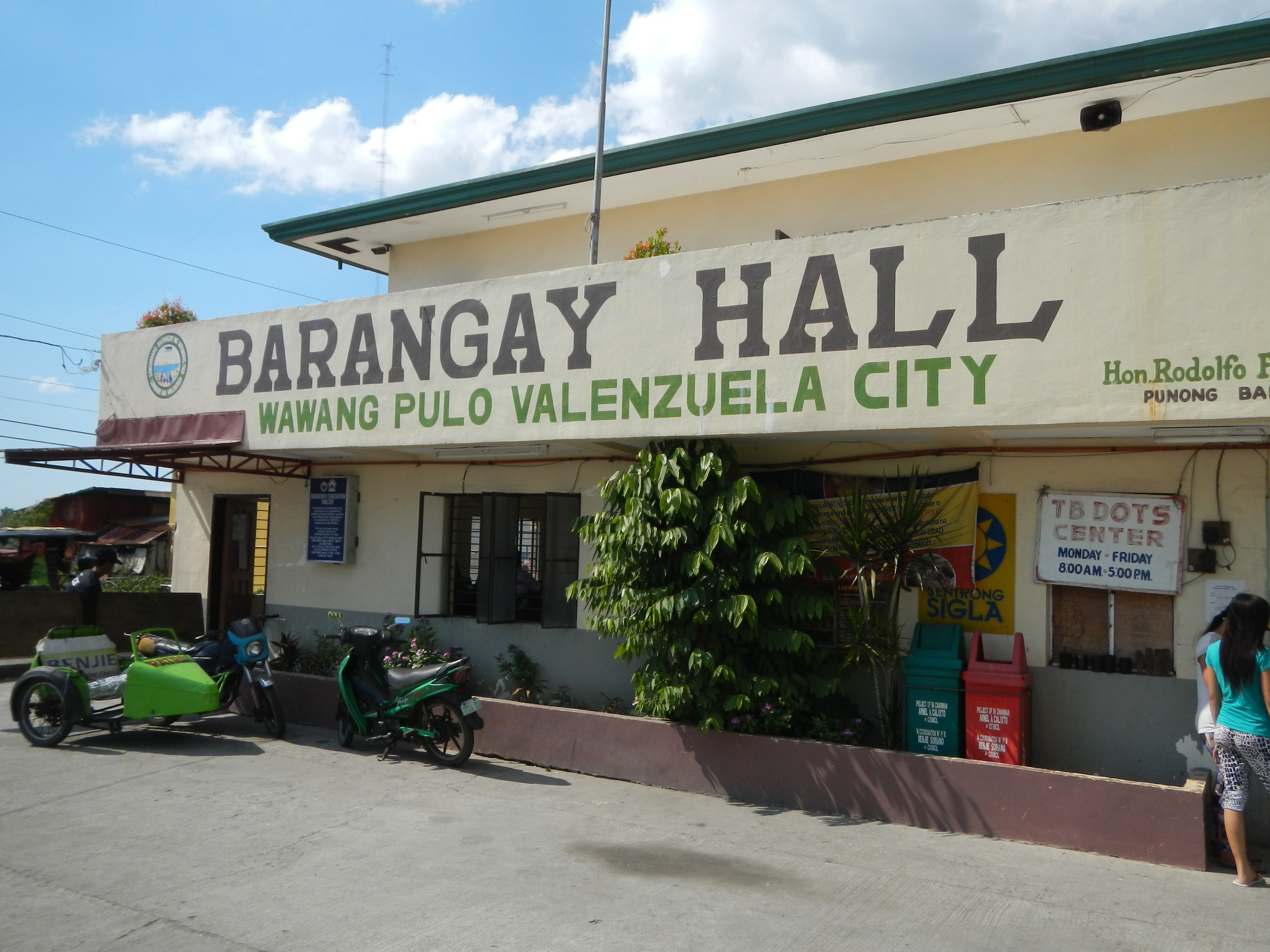
Wawang Pulo barangay hall

== See also ==
- List of populated places in Metro Manila
