= Saint Lucy =

Third-fourth century Christian martyr and a canonized saint

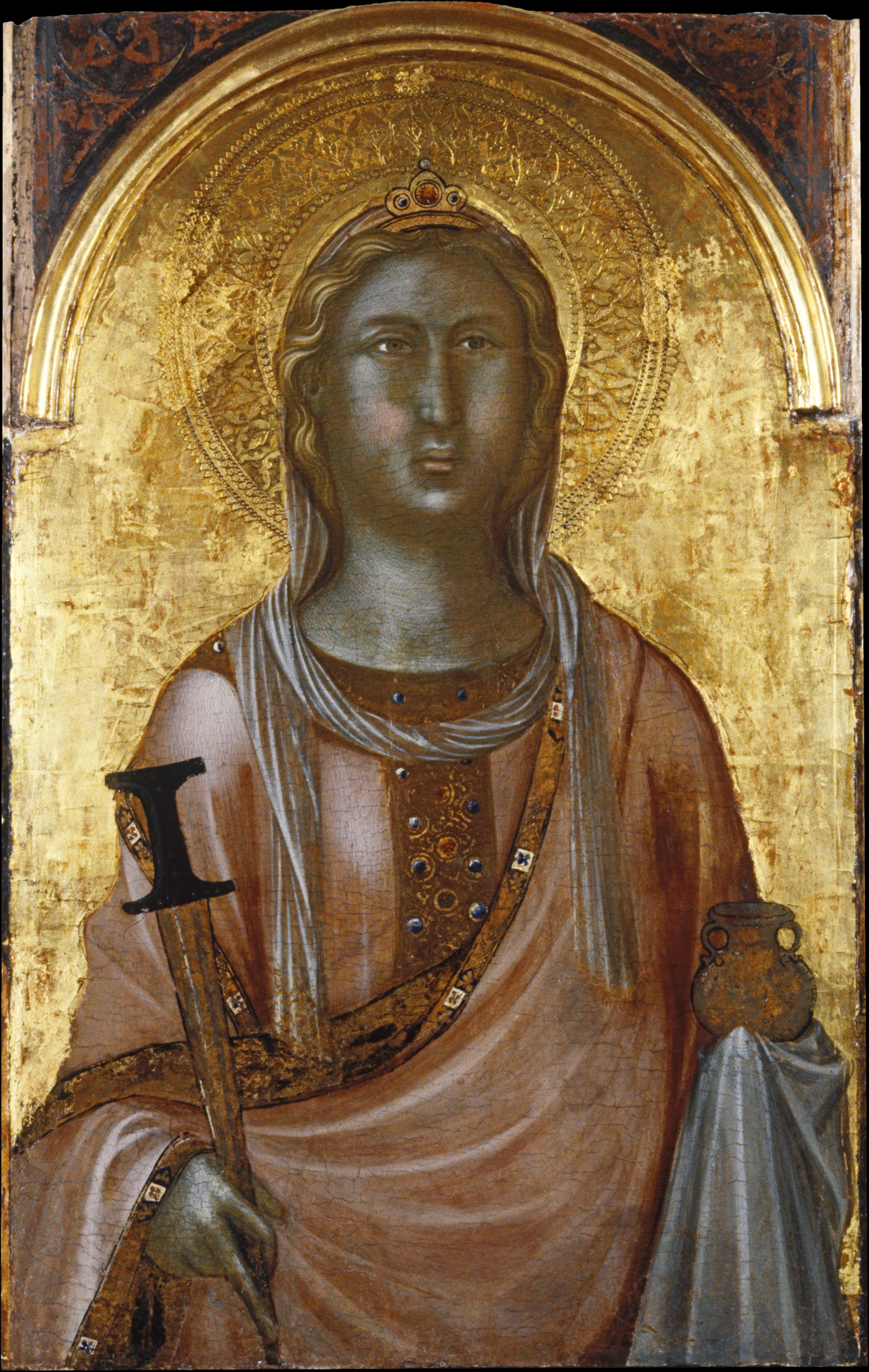
- Saint Lucy by Niccolò di Segna, c. 1340. The saint holds the dagger or sword with which she was ultimately executed, as well as the lamp, her attribute.

Virgin and Martyr
- Born: c. 283; Syracuse, Sicilia, Roman Empire
- Died: 304 (aged 20–21); Syracuse, Sicilia, Eastern Roman Empire
- Venerated in: Catholic Church; Eastern Orthodox Church; Oriental Orthodoxy; Anglican Communion; Lutheranism
- Canonized: Catholic Church
- Major shrine: Sanctuary of Santa Lucia al Sepolcro and Cathedral of Syracuse Syracuse, San Geremia, Venice
- Feast: 13 December; 16 September (duplicate feast in pre-1970 General Roman Calendar)
- Attributes: Cord; eyes; eyes on a dish; blindfold; palm branch, lamp; swords; woman hitched to a yoke of oxen; woman in the company of Saint Agatha, Saint Rosalia, Saint Agnes of Rome, Saint Barbara, Saint Catherine of Alexandria, and Saint Thecla; woman kneeling before the tomb of Saint Agatha
- Patronage: The blind; martyrs; Perugia, Italy; Mtarfa, Malta; epidemics; salesmen; Syracuse, Italy; throat infections; writers; Sasmuan, Pampanga, Santa Lucia, Ilocos Sur, Narvacan, Ilocos Sur, Philippines

Lucia of Syracuse (c. 283 – 304 AD), also called Santa Lucia (Latin: Sancta Lucia) and better known as Saint Lucy, was a Roman Christian martyr who died during the Diocletianic Persecution. She is venerated as a saint in the Catholic Church. She is one of eight women (including the Virgin Mary) explicitly commemorated by Catholics in the Canon of the Mass. Her traditional feast day, known in Europe as Saint Lucy's Day, is observed by Western Christians on 13 December. Lucia of Syracuse was honored in the Middle Ages and remained a well-known saint in early modern England. She is one of the best known virgin martyrs, along with Agatha of Sicily, Agnes of Rome, Cecilia of Rome, and Catherine of Alexandria.

== Sources ==
The oldest record of her story comes from the fourth century, archaeology and later Acts of the Martyrs. The single fact upon which various accounts agree is that a disappointed suitor accused Lucy of being a Christian, and she was executed in Syracuse, Sicily, in 304 AD, during the Diocletianic Persecution. Her veneration spread to Rome, and by the sixth century to the whole Church. The oldest archaeological evidence comes from the Greek inscriptions from the Catacombs of St. John in Syracuse. Jacobus de Voragine's Legenda Aurea was the most widely read version of the Lucy legend in the Middle Ages. In medieval accounts, Saint Lucy's eyes were gouged out prior to her execution. The most ancient archaeological traces attributable to the cult of Saint Lucia have been brought back to Sicily, particularly in Syracuse, and are preserved in the archaeological museums of the city.

== Life ==
All the details of her life are the conventional ones associated with female martyrs of the early fourth century.

According to the traditional story, Lucy was born to rich and noble parents in 283 in Syracuse. Her father was of Roman origin, but died when she was five years old, leaving Lucy and her mother without a protective guardian. Her mother's name, Eutychia, seems to indicate that she came from a Greek background.

Like many of the early martyrs, Lucy had consecrated her virginity to God, and she hoped to distribute her dowry to the poor. However, Eutychia, not knowing of Lucy's promise, and suffering from a bleeding disorder, feared for Lucy's future. She arranged Lucy's marriage to a young man of a wealthy pagan family.

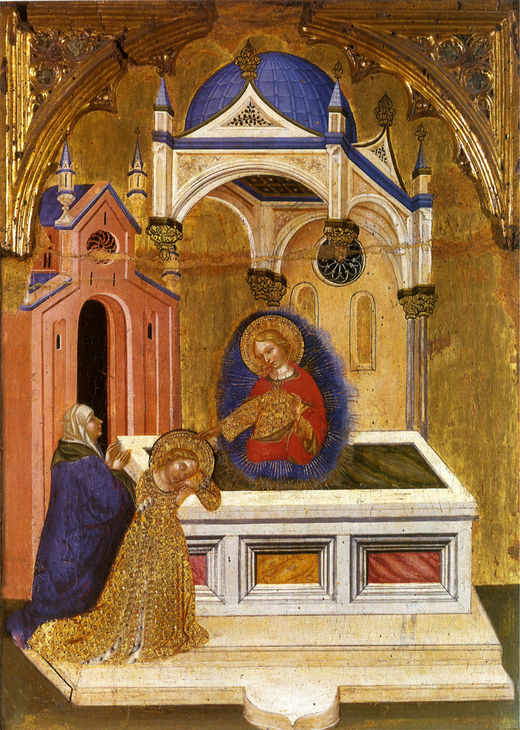
Eutychia and Lucy at the Tomb of Saint Agatha, by Jacobello del Fiore

Saint Agatha had been martyred 52 years before, during the Decian persecution. Her shrine at Catania, less than 50 miles (80 km) from Syracuse, attracted a number of pilgrims; many miracles were reported to have happened through her intercession. Eutychia was persuaded to make a pilgrimage to Catania, in hopes of a cure. While there, St. Agatha came to Lucy in a dream and told her that because of her faith, her mother would be cured and that Lucy would be the glory of Syracuse, as she was of Catania. With her mother cured, Lucy took the opportunity to persuade her mother to allow her to distribute a great part of her riches among the poor.

Eutychia suggested that the sums would make a good bequest, but Lucy countered, "...whatever you give away at death for the Lord's sake you give because you cannot take it with you. Give now to the true Savior, while you are healthy, whatever you intended to give away at your death."

News that the patrimony and jewels were being distributed came to Lucy's betrothed, who denounced her to Paschasius, the Governor of Syracuse. Paschasius ordered her to burn a sacrifice to the emperor's image. When she refused, Paschasius sentenced her to be defiled in a brothel.

The Christian tradition states that when the guards came to take her away, they could not move her even when they hitched her to a team of oxen. Bundles of wood were then heaped about her and set on fire, but did not burn. Finally, she met her death by the sword thrust into her throat.

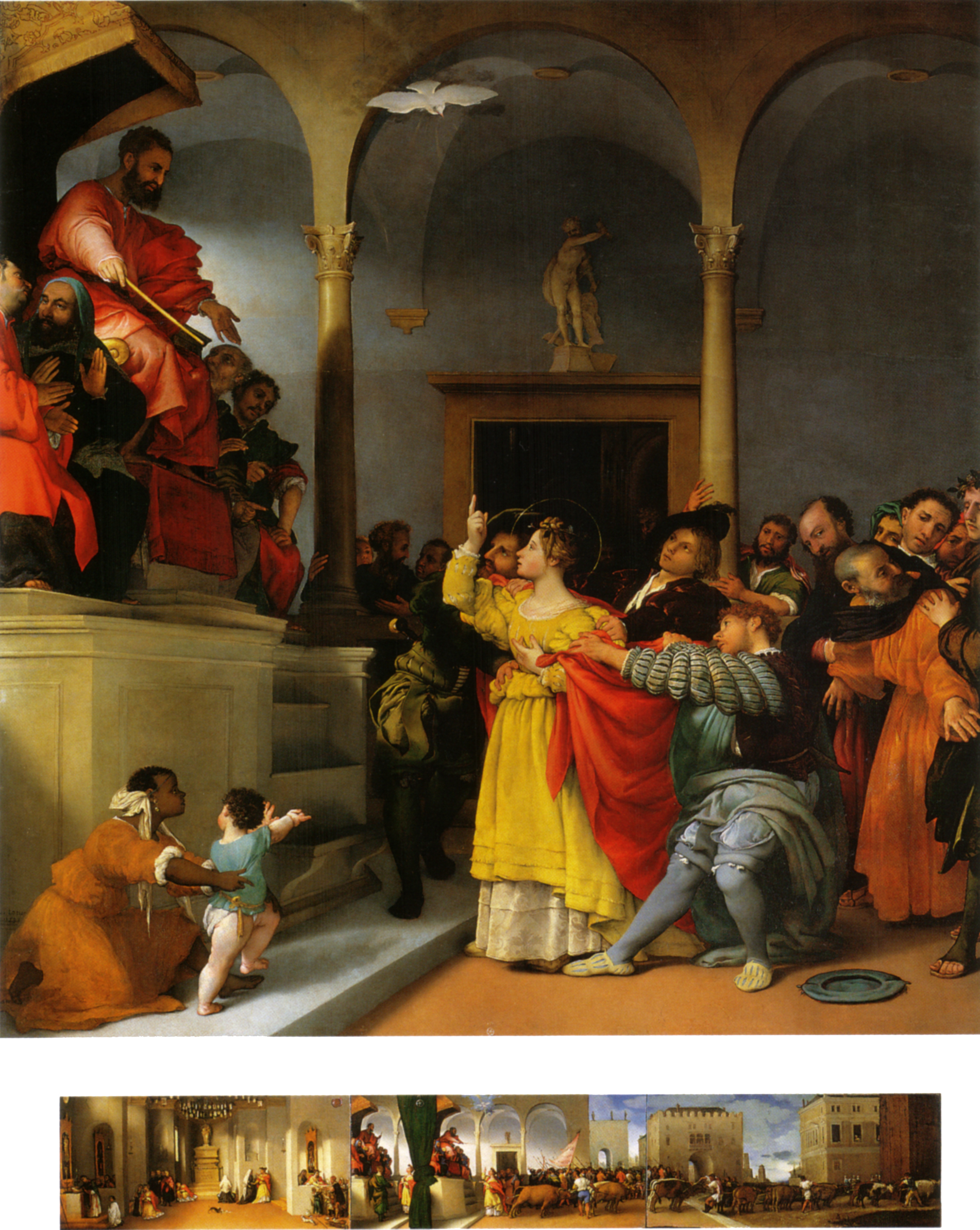
Lucy Before the Judge, by Lorenzo Lotto, 1523–1532

Absent in the early narratives and traditions, at least until the fifteenth century, is the story of Lucia tortured by eye-gouging. According to later accounts, before she died, she foretold the punishment of Paschasius and the speedy end of the persecution, adding that Diocletian would reign no more and Maximian would meet his end. This so angered Paschasius that he ordered the guards to remove her eyes. Another version has Lucy taking her own eyes out in order to discourage a persistent suitor who admired them. When her body was prepared for burial in the family mausoleum it was discovered that her eyes had been miraculously restored. This is one of the reasons that Lucy is the patroness saint of those with eye illnesses.

== Veneration ==
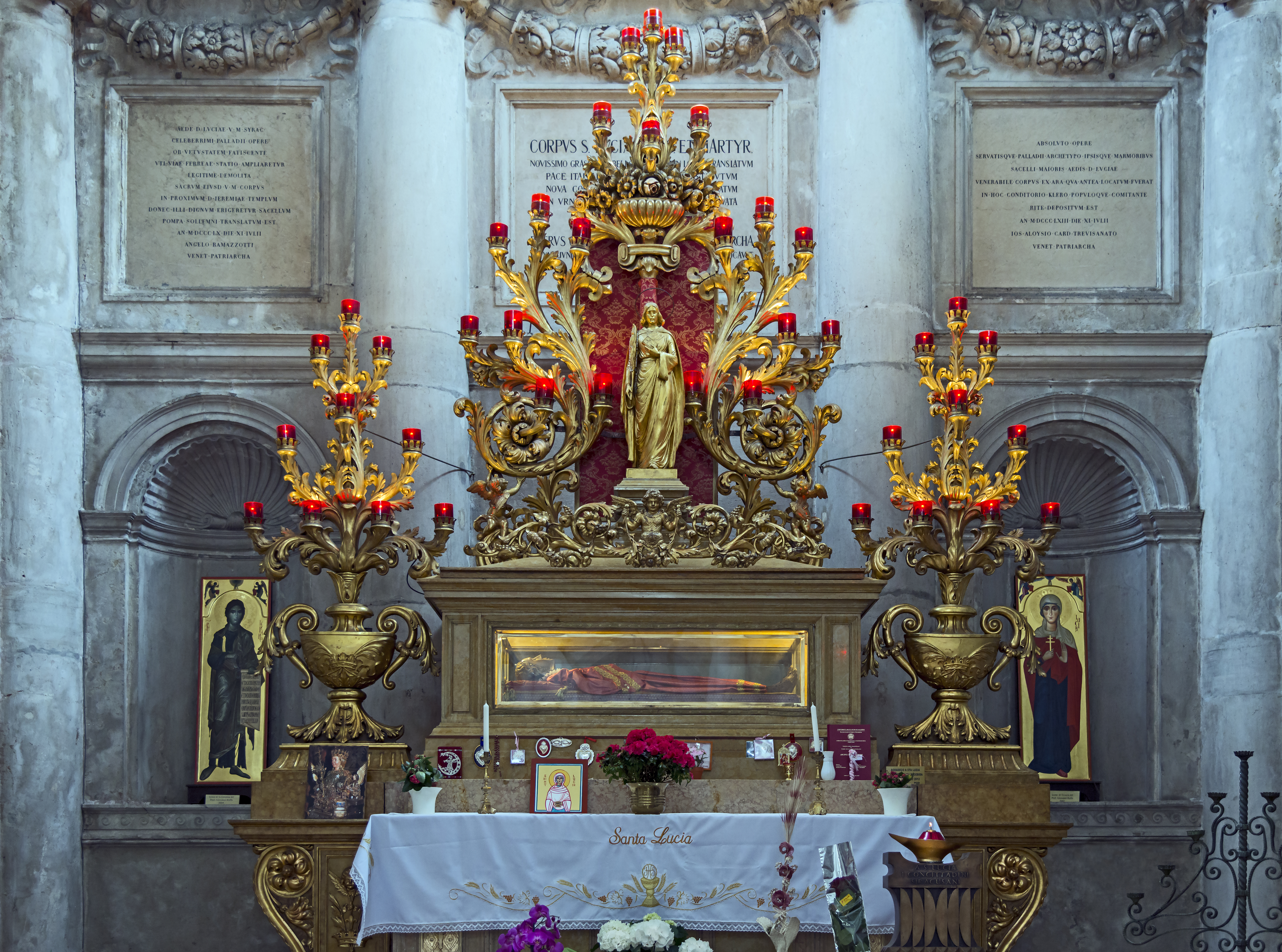
Altar of Saint Lucy, San Geremia (Venice)

The earliest evidence of Lucy’s veneration is the grave stele of Euskia, which was discovered in the catacombs of Syracuse, Sicily and is now housed in the Museo archeologico regionale Paolo Orsi. Euskia was a 25-year-old woman who died on St Lucy’s Day in the late 300s or early 400s. By the sixth century, her story was sufficiently widespread that she appears in the procession of virgins in the Basilica of Sant'Apollinare Nuovo in Ravenna and in the Sacramentary of Pope Gregory I. She is also commemorated in the ancient Roman Martyrology. St. Aldhelm (English, died in 709) and later the Venerable Bede (English, died in 735) attest that her popularity had already spread to England, where her festival was kept in England until the Protestant Reformation, as a holy day of the second rank in which no work but tillage or the like was allowed.

Lucy is honoured in the Catholic Church, in the Church of England, in the Episcopal Church, and in the Lutheran Church on 13 December.

The monk Sigebert of Gembloux (1030–1112) wrote a mid-eleventh-century passio, to support a local cult of Lucy at Metz.

The General Roman Calendar formerly had a commemoration of Saints Lucy and Geminianus on 16 September. This was removed in 1969, as a duplication of the feast of her dies natalis on 13 December and because the Geminianus in question, mentioned in the Passio of Saint Lucy, seems to be a fictitious figure, unrelated to the Geminianus whose feast is on 31 January.

=== Relics ===
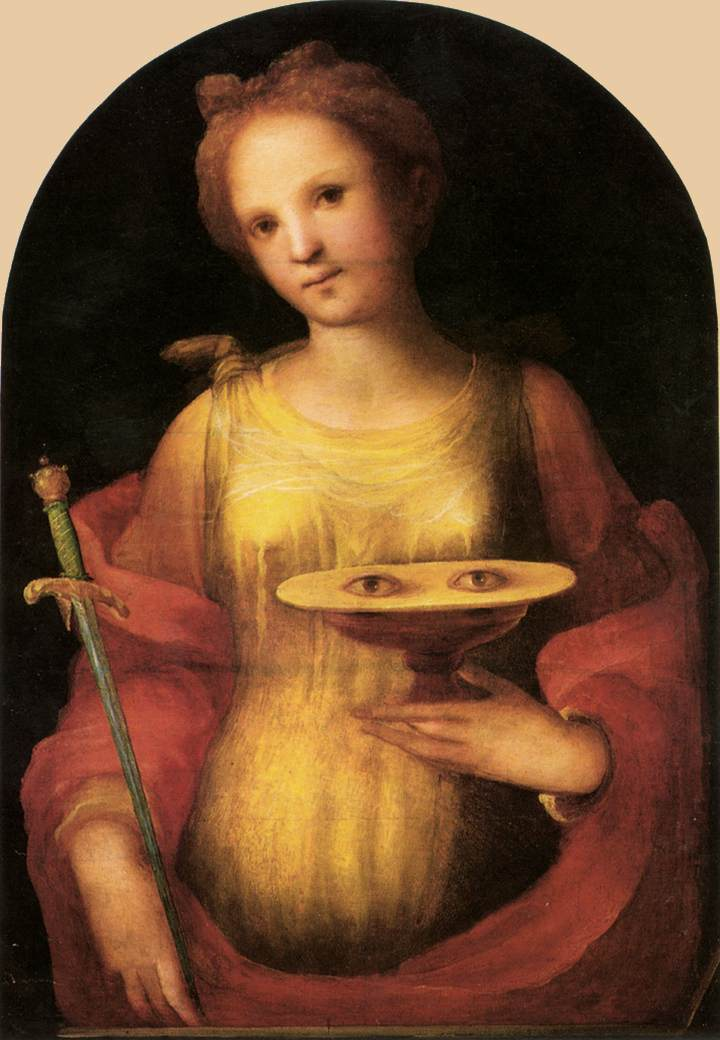
Saint Lucy by Domenico Beccafumi, 1521, a Renaissance recasting of a Gothic iconic image (Pinacoteca Nazionale, Siena)

Sigebert of Gembloux, in his sermo de Sancta Lucia, chronicled that her body lay undisturbed in Sicily for 400 years, before Faroald II, Duke of Spoleto, captured the island and transferred the body to Corfinium in Abruzzo, Italy. From there it was removed by the Emperor Otho I in 972 to Metz and deposited in the church of St. Vincent. It was from this shrine that an arm of the saint was taken to the monastery of Luitburg in the Diocese of Speyer – an incident celebrated by Sigebert in verse.

The subsequent history of the relics is not clear. According to Umberto Benigni, Stephen II (768) sent the relics of St. Lucy to Constantinople for safety against the Saracen incursions. On their capture of Constantinople in 1204, the French found some relics attributed to Saint Lucy in the city, and Enrico Dandolo, Doge of Venice, secured them for the monastery of St. George at Venice. In 1513 the Venetians presented to Louis XII of France the saint's head, which he deposited in the cathedral church of Bourges. Another account, however, states that the head was brought to Bourges from Rome, where it had been transferred during the time when the relics rested in Corfinium.

Parts of the body are present in Sicily in particular in Syracuse, which has preserved them from antiquity. The remainder of the relics remain in Venice: they were transferred to the church of San Geremia when the church of Santa Lucia was demolished in 1861 to make way for the new railway terminus. A century later, on 7 November 1981, thieves stole all her bones, except her head. Police recovered them five weeks later, on her feast day. Other parts of the corpse have found their way to Rome, Naples, Verona, Lisbon, Milan, as well as Germany and France.

== Patronage ==
Lucy's Latin name Lucia shares a root (luc-) with the Latin word for light, lux. A number of traditions incorporate symbolic meaning of St. Lucy as the bearer of light in the darkness of winter, her feast day being 13 December. Because some versions of her story relate that her eyes were removed, either by herself or by her persecutors, she is the patroness saint of the blind.

She is also the patroness saint of ophthalmologists, authors, cutlers, glaziers, laborers, martyrs, peasants, saddlers, salesmen, stained glass workers, photogrammetry, and of Perugia, Italy. She is invoked against hemorrhages, dysentery, diseases of the eye, and throat infections.

St. Lucy is the patroness of Syracuse in Sicily, Italy. At the Piazza Duomo in Syracuse, the church of Santa Lucia alla Badia used to house the painting Burial of St. Lucy by Caravaggio. But it is now housed in the church of Santa Lucia al Sepolcro in Syracuse. She is also the patroness saint of the coastal town of Olón, Ecuador, which celebrates with a week-long festival culminating on the feast day 13 December. She is also the patroness saint of the town of Guane, Santander, Colombia.

The Caribbean island of Saint Lucia, one of the Windward Islands in the Lesser Antilles, is named after her.

== Iconography ==
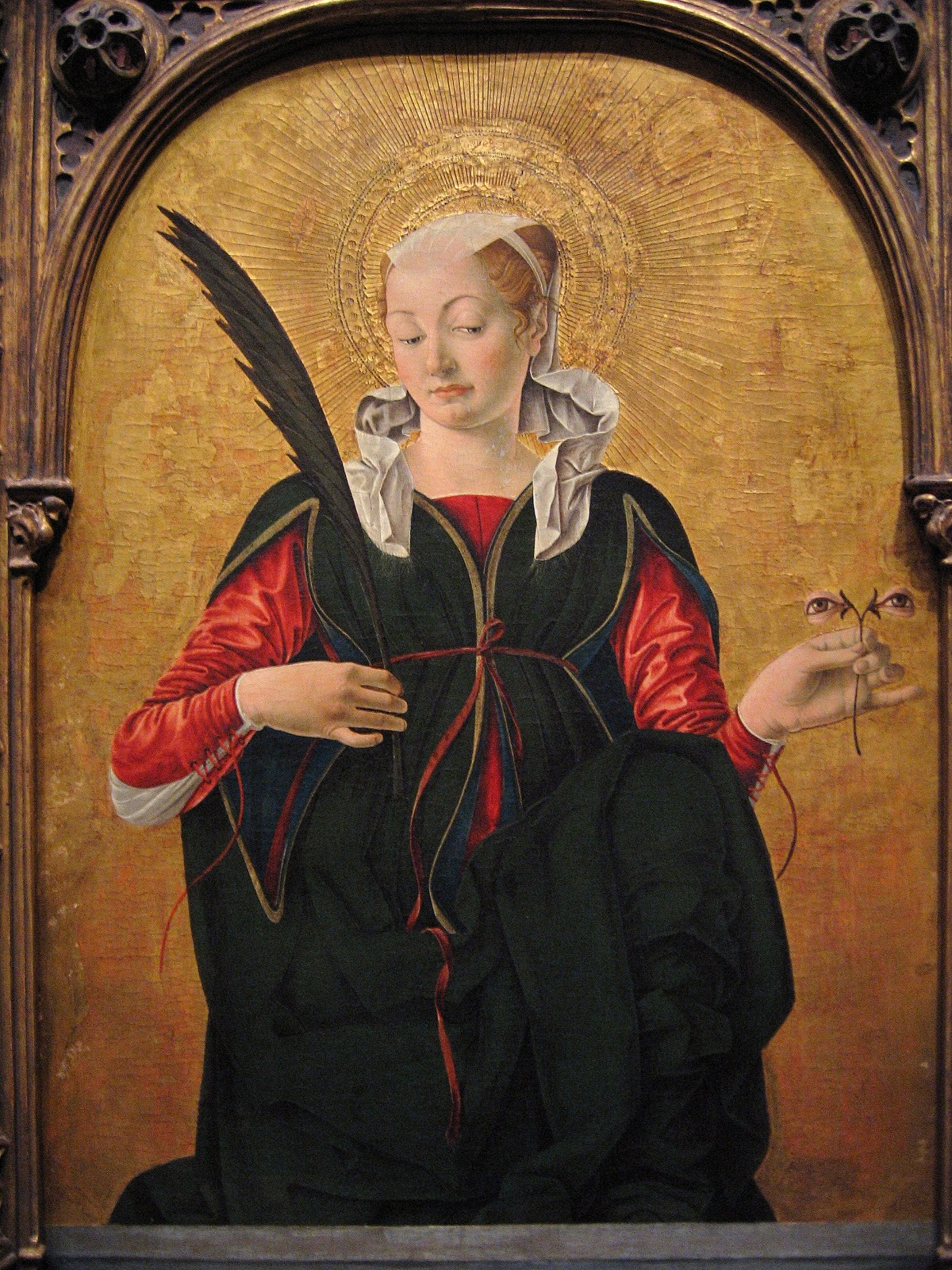
Saint Lucy, by Francesco del Cossa (c. 1430 – c. 1477)

The emblem of eyes on a cup or plate apparently reflects popular devotion to her as protector of sight, because of her name, Lucia (from the Latin word "lux" which means "light"). In paintings St. Lucy is frequently shown holding her eyes on a golden plate. Lucy was represented in Gothic art holding a dish with two eyes on it. She also holds the palm branch, symbol of martyrdom and victory over evil. Other symbolic images include a lamp, dagger, sword or two oxen.

Pharmacy jar with portrait of St. Lucy. Sicily, Italy, early 1600s. Tin-glazed earthenware (maiolica). Gardiner Museum, Toronto.

== In literature ==
=== Dante ===
In Dante Alighieri's Divine Comedy Lucy first appears in Canto 2 of Inferno as the messenger sent to Beatrice from "The blessed Dame" (the Virgin Mary), to rouse Beatrice to send Virgil to Dante's aid. Henry Fanshawe Tozer identifies Lucia as representing "illuminative grace". According to Robert Pogue Harrison and Rachel Jacoff, Lucia's appearance in this intermediary role is to reinforce the scene in which Virgil tries to fortify Dante's courage to begin the journey through the inferno.

In Purgatorio 9.52–63, Lucy carries a sleeping Dante to the entrance to purgatory. Since Lucy represents light, her appearance in Purgatorio 9 mirrors her appearance in Inferno 2; both times she carries him out of darkness. Lucy's light symbolism also explains why Dante tells this evening scene in Purgatorio 9 through the lens of the dawn. She carries him both out of the literal darkness to a new day, as well as the figurative darkness to lead him to salvation.

Then in Paradiso 32, Dante places her opposite Adam within the Mystic Rose in Canto XXXII of the Paradiso. Lucy may also be seen as a figure of Illuminating Grace or Mercy or even Justice.

=== Donne ===
In the Late Middle Ages the shortest day of the year usually fell on her feast day, and the two became associated, as in John Donne's poem, "A Nocturnal upon St. Lucie's Day, being the shortest day" (1627). The poem begins with: "'Tis the year's midnight, and it is the day's". Due to the inaccuracy of the Julian Calendar, the shortest day actually fell a day or two earlier in Donne's time.

Lucia is also the protagonist of a Swedish novel: "Ett ljus i mörkret" ("A light in the darkness") by Agneta Sjödin.

== In popular culture ==
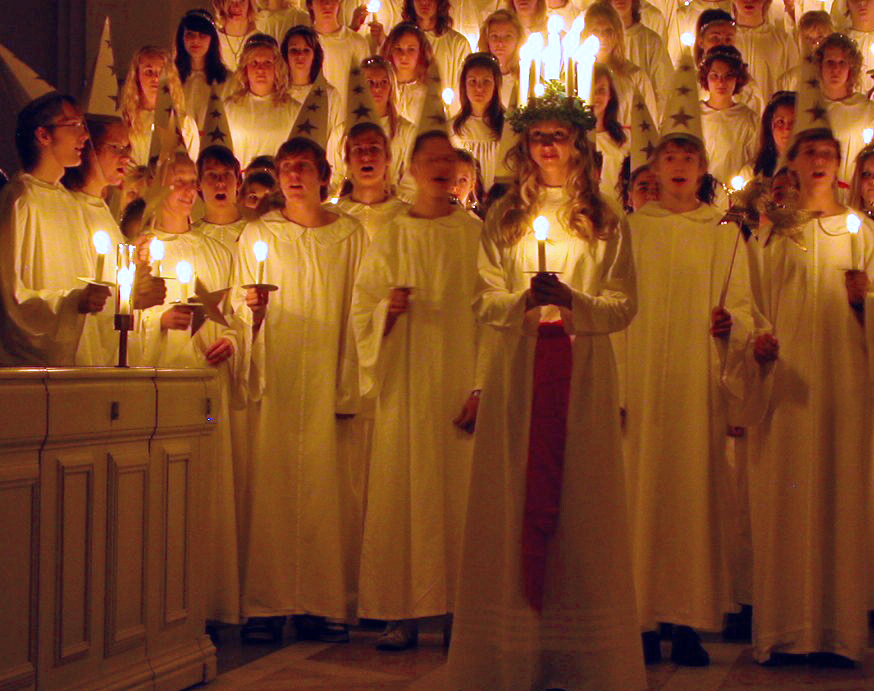
Saint Lucia procession in Sweden

Lucy's feast is on 13 December, in Advent. Her feast once coincided with the Winter Solstice, the shortest day of the year, before calendar reforms, so her feast day has become a festival of light.

St. Lucy is the patroness saint of the city of Syracuse (Sicily). On 13 December a silver statue of St. Lucy containing her relics is paraded through the streets before returning to the Cathedral of Syracuse. Sicilians recall a legend that holds that a famine ended on her feast day when ships loaded with grain entered the harbor. Here, it is traditional to eat whole grains instead of bread on 13 December. This usually takes the form of cuccìa, a dish of boiled wheat berries often mixed with ricotta and honey, or sometimes served as a savory soup with beans.

Celebration of St. Lucy's day is particularly seen in Scandinavian countries, with their long dark winters. Traditionally, a young girl is dressed in a white dress and a red sash (as the symbol of martyrdom) and wears a crown or wreath of candles on her head. In Denmark, Norway, Sweden, and parts of Finland, girls and boys dressed as Lucy or different roles associated with Christmastide, such as carry Saint Stephen or gingerbread men, walking in procession as songs are sung. Lucia celebrations are held in various places such as schools, churches, offices and hospitals, traditionally combined with eating saffron buns and gingerbread cookies. It is said that to vividly celebrate St. Lucy's Day will help one live the long winter days with enough light.

A special devotion to St. Lucy is practiced in the Italian regions of Lombardy, Emilia-Romagna, Veneto, Friuli-Venezia Giulia, Trentino-Alto Adige, in the North of the country, and Sicily and Calabria, in the South, as well as in the Croatian coastal region of Dalmatia. The feast is a Catholic-celebrated holiday with roots that can be traced to Sicily. On the 13th of every December it is celebrated with large traditional feasts of home-made pasta and various other Italian dishes, with a special dessert called cuccìa, made of wheatberries, butter, sugar, chocolate, and milk. The large grains of soft wheat are representative of her eyes and are a treat only to be indulged in once a year. In North Italy, Saint Lucy brings gift to children between 12 and 13 December. Traditionally a bouquet of hay is put outside of the house for Lucy's Donkey and food in the house for Lucy to refresh them after the long night bringing gifts to every kid. In small towns, a parade with Saint Lucy is held the evening of the 12th when she goes through the main streets of the town munching sweets and candy from her cart, always together with her donkey.

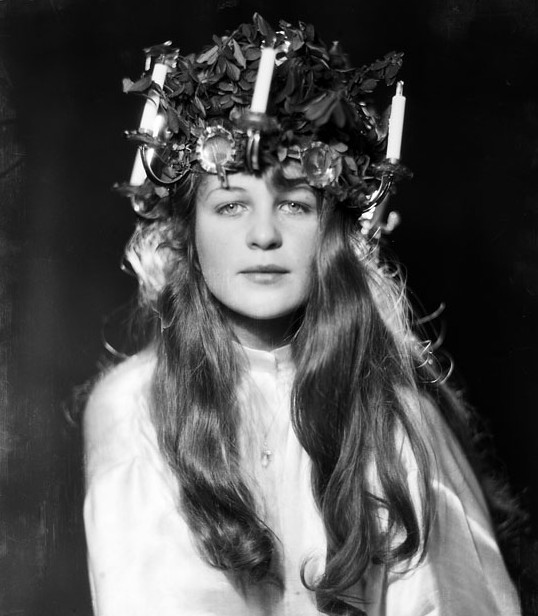
Picture of the actress Solveig Hedengran as Saint Lucy

A Hungarian custom is to plant wheat in a small pot on St. Lucy's feast. By Christmas green sprouts appear, signs of life coming from death. The wheat is then carried to the manger scene as the symbol of Christ in the Eucharist.

The day is celebrated in the Philippines as well. Villagers from Barangay Sta. Lucia in Magarao, Camarines Sur, hold a novena to St. Lucy nine days before her feast. A procession of the saint's image is held every morning at the poblacion or village centre during the nine days leading up to St. Lucy's Day, attracting devotees from other parts of the Bicol Region. Hymns to the saint, known as the Gozos, as well as the Spanish version of the Ave Maria are chanted during the dawn procession, which is followed by a Mass. In Barangay Sta. Lucia, Asturias town in midwestern Cebu, thousands of devotees used to visit her parish to celebrate and venerate her sainthood. Along with their veneration to her are the hope in faith that her Holy water is instrumental in channeling Almighty God's grace and blessings in the form of protection, purification and healing from illness particularly eye disorders to them as she is best known for being the Patroness Saint of the blind.

The feast day is also commemorated in Barangay Sucad in Apalit Pampanga after the traditional nine-day novena, where a whole day celebration is observed through Eucharistic Masses, festivals and the procession of the religious sculpture of Sta. Lucia in the evening before the evening Mass.

The Kuraldal Festival in Sasmuan, Pampanga, is a centuries-old annual folk-dance tradition held every January 6 to honor the town's patron saint, Santa Lucia (Apung Lucia).The Santa Lucia Parish Church in Sasmuan is the first church in the province built by Augustinian priests. It stands right beside the Río Grande, a river that connects Pampanga to Manila Bay. The structure is said to have been built by Jose Duque in the 17th century, was rebuilt in the early 1800s, and was reinforced by Toribio Fanjul in 1884. The edifice has decorative floral carvings on its main entrance. The old town church is one of the few, if not the only church in the country where the single belfry is situated between the church and the convento. The church, which measures 45 metres (148 ft) long, 11 metres (36 ft) wide, and 6 metres (20 ft) high, also features a grotto of Our Lady of Fatima. Devotees from all over the province flock here to honor Saint Lucy, believed to be a miraculous saint. Founded in 1590, Santa Lucia is a parish of the Vicariate of St. Joseph in the Archdiocese of San Fernando. The parish celebrates the feast day of its titular patron on December 13

Saint Lucy also figures in the American horror flim The Nun II (2023) where the main protagonist (who is revealed to be a descendant of her family) utilises the power of her eye relics concealed in a deconsecrated chapel at France's Tarascon to defeat a demon nun. Saint Lucy acts as an ability for Fuuka Yamagishi in the video game Persona 3 (2006).

== Namesakes ==
=== Churches ===
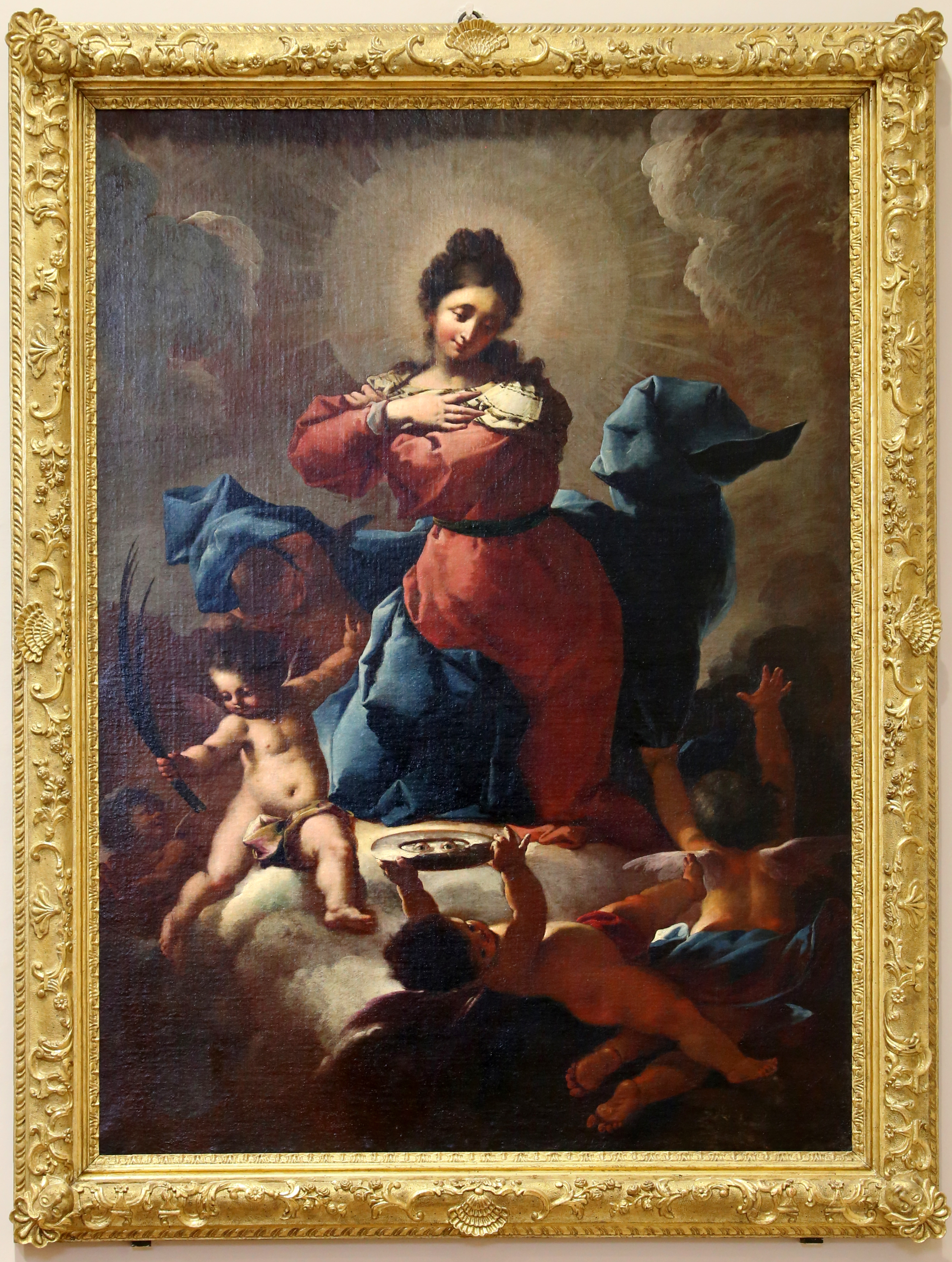
Saint Lucy by Francesco Conti

- Church of St. Lucia at the Tomb (Church of St. Lucia Outside the Walls), Syracuse, Sicily, Italy
- Santa Lucìa alla Badìa, Siracusa, adjoining the Cathedral of Syracuse, Sicily, Italy
- Chiesa di Santa Lucia, Belpasso, Catania, Sicily, Italy
- Basilica di Santa Lucia a Mare, Naples, Italy
- Church of San Geremia and the grave of Saint Lucy, Venice, Italy
- Archdiocesan Shrine of Saint Lucy of Syracuse, Santa Lucia, Ilocos Sur, Philippines
- Saint Lucy of Syracuse Parish, Sasmuan, Pampanga
- Santa Lucia Parish, Novaliches, Quezon City
- Igreja de Santa Luzia, Rio de Janeiro, Brazil.
- Santa Lucia Parish, Calumpit, Bulacan.

=== Places ===
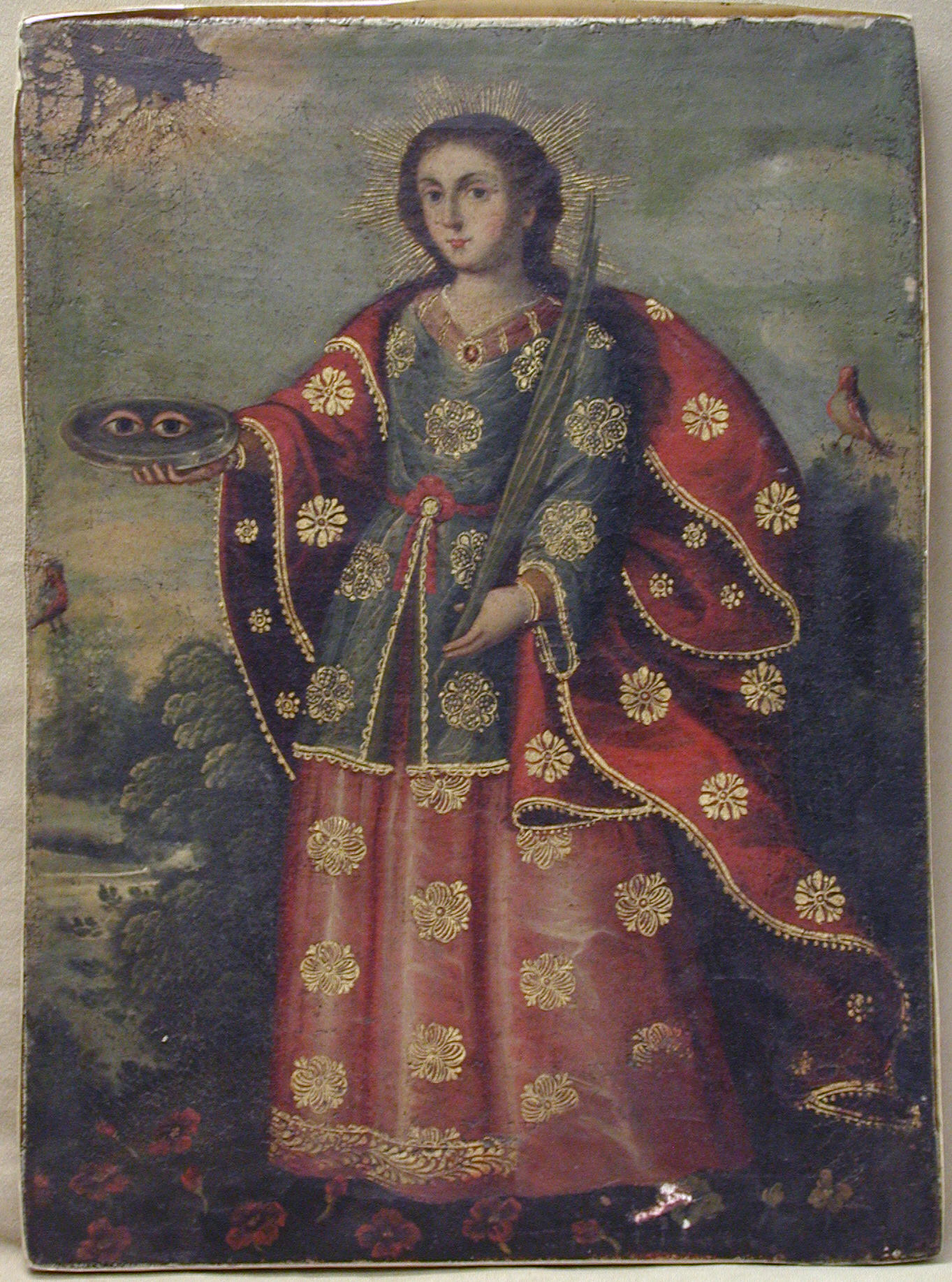
Saint Lucy in the style of Cusco School

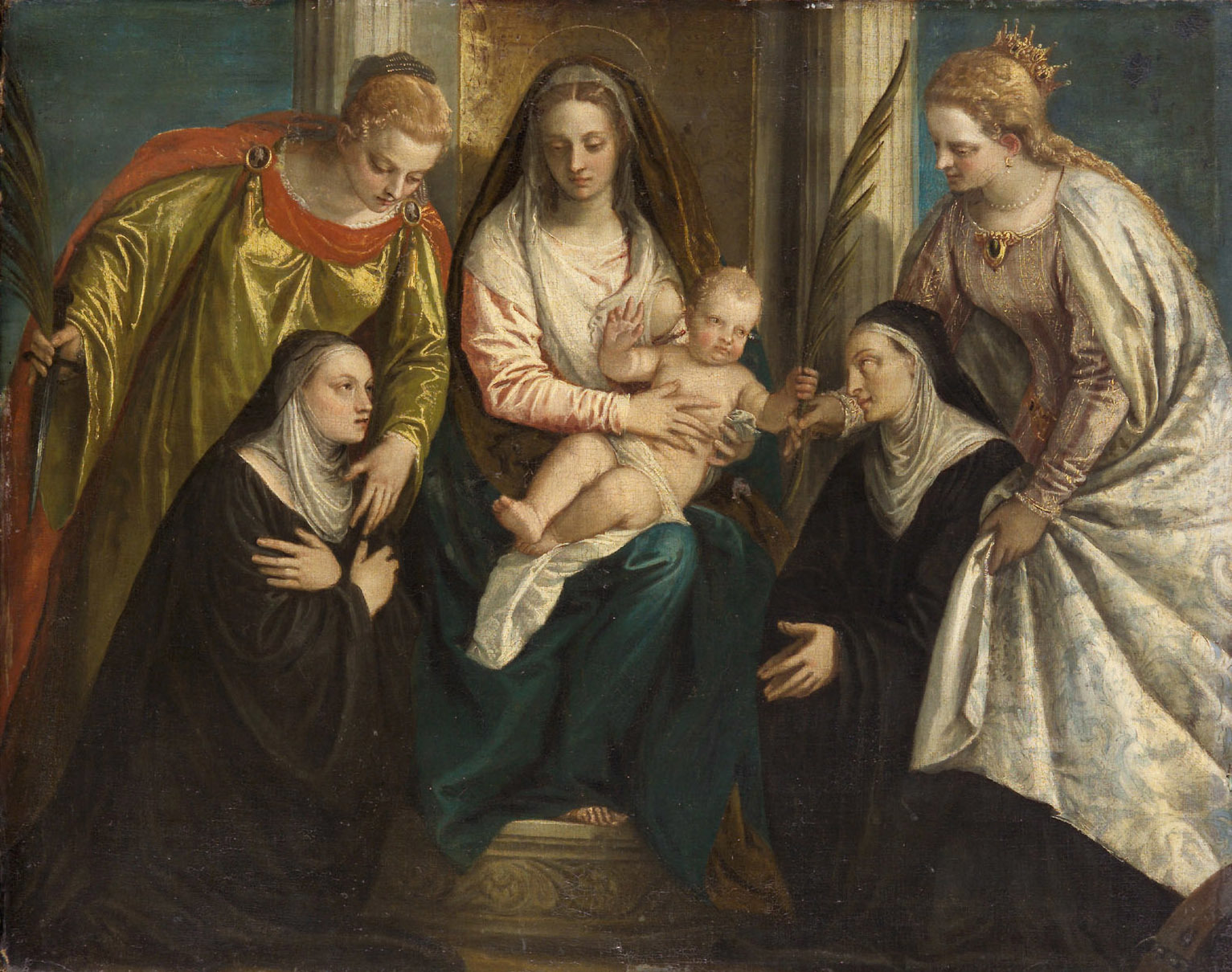
Madonna and Child with Saints Lucy and Catherine along with two nuns by Paolo Veronese, 1580s

- St. Lucia, a country in the Caribbean
- Barangay Sta. Lucia, Novaliches, Quezon City, Metro Manila, Philippines
- Sta. Lucia, San Luis, Pampanga
- Barangay Sta. Lucia, Pasig, Metro Manila, Philippines
- Borgo Santa Lucia, Naples, Italy
- Port St. Lucie, Florida, United States
- Saint Lucy, Barbados, Caribbean
- Sainte-Lucie-de-Beauregard, Quebec, Canada
- Sainte-Lucie-des-Laurentides, Quebec, Canada
- Santa Lucia Parish Church Barangay Santa Lucia, Asturias, Cebu, Philippines
- Santa Lucia Chapel, Barangay Sucad, Apalit, Pampanga (Philippines)
- Santa Lucía de Tirajana (Gran Canaria) Canary Islands, Spain
- Santa Lucia, Ilocos Sur, Philippines
- Santa Lucía, La Rioja, Argentina
- Santa Lucia, Magarao, Camarines Sur, Philippines
- Santa Luċija, Malta
- Santa Luċija, Gozo
- Santa Lucia Mountains, California, United States
- Sta. Lucia, Asturias, Cebu, Philippines
- Sta. Lucia Village Phase 4, Punturin, Valenzuela City, Metro Manila, Philippines
- St. Lucie County, Florida, United States
- St. Lucie Village, Florida, United States
- St. Lucia Estuary, KwaZulu-Natal, South Africa
- St Lucia, Queensland, Australia
- St. Lucy's Holy Well, Killua Castle, Clonmellon, County Westmeath, Ireland
- Santa Luzia, Minas Gerais, Brazil
- Santa Luzia, Paraíba, Brazil
- Santa Lucía del Tuy, Miranda, Venezuela
- Santa Lucía, Canelones, Uruguay

=== Schools ===
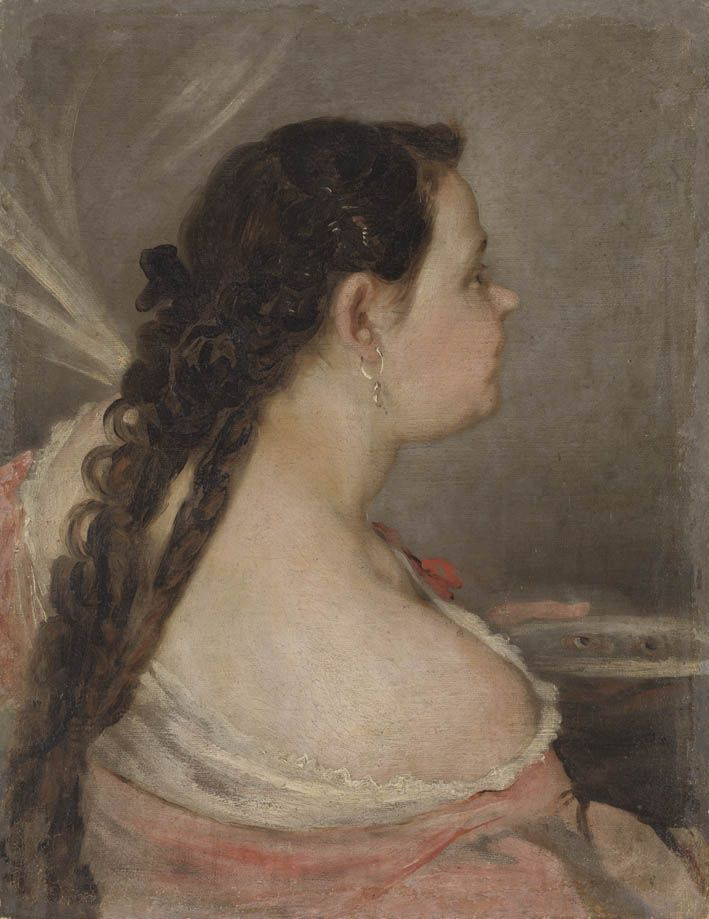
A rear view of St. Lucy by Francisco Goya

- St Lucia Girls High School Kauti, Nunguni, Makueni County, Kenya
- Sta. Lucia Elementary School, Masantol, Pampanga, Philippines
- Sta. Lucia Elementary School, De Castro Subd., Barangay Sta. Lucia, Pasig, Philippines
- St. Lucy Integrated School of Manila, Malate, Manila, Philippines
- St. Lucia's School, Kotahena, Colombo, Sri Lanka
- St. Lucy Catholic Elementary School, Brampton, Ontario, Canada
- St. Lucy Catholic Elementary School, Toronto, Ontario, Canada (defunct)
- St. Lucy Catholic Elementary School, Edmonton, Alberta, Canada
- St. Lucy's Primary School, Abronhill, North Lanarkshire, Scotland
- Sta. Lucia High School Novaliches, Quezon City, Metro Manila, Philippines
- Santa Lucia Catholic School, Chicago, Illinois, United States
- St. Lucy's Priory High School, Glendora, California, United States
- St. Lucy Day School for the Blind and Visually Impaired, Philadelphia, Pennsylvania, United States
- St. Lucy's School of Archdiocese of Pampanga, Sasmuan, Pampanga, Philippines
- St. Lucy's School (dedicated in 1955), Bronx, New York, United States
- Sta. Lucía del Tuy, Miranda, Venezuela
- St Lucy's School for children with disabilities, Wahroonga (Sydney), Australia

=== Other ===
- Santa Lucía Hill, otherwise known as Cerro Huelen, Santiago, Chile
- Venezia Santa Lucia railway station, Venice, Italy
- Sta. Lucia Mall, Cainta, Rizal, Philippines
- Hospital Oftalmológico Santa Lucía, Ciudad Autónoma de Buenos Aires, Argentina

== See also ==
- List of Christian women of the patristic age
- List of Eastern Orthodox saints
- List of Roman Catholic saints
- Saint Paraskevi, a female, Eastern saint frequently displayed with eyes on a plate.
- Saint Lucy, patron saint archive
- Saint Odile, another saint of the blind.
