= St. Gregory's College =

St. Gregory's College, St. Gregory College, or variants, may refer to:

- St. Gregory's University, formerly St. Gregory's College, Shawnee, Oklahoma, U.S.
- St Gregory's College, Campbelltown, in Sydney, New South Wales, Australia
- St Gregory's College, Lagos, in Nigeria
- Saint Gregory's Catholic College, in Odd Down, Bath, England
- St Gregory's Catholic Science College, in Kenton, London Borough of Harrow, England
- St. Gregory College of Valenzuela, in the Philippines
- Colegio de San Gregorio, a former college, now museum, in Valladolid, Castile and León, Spain
- Liceo Saint Gregory's, in Rosario, Rengo, Cachapoal Province, Chile

== See also ==
- St Gregory's School (disambiguation)
