= San Geremia =

Church in Venice, Italy

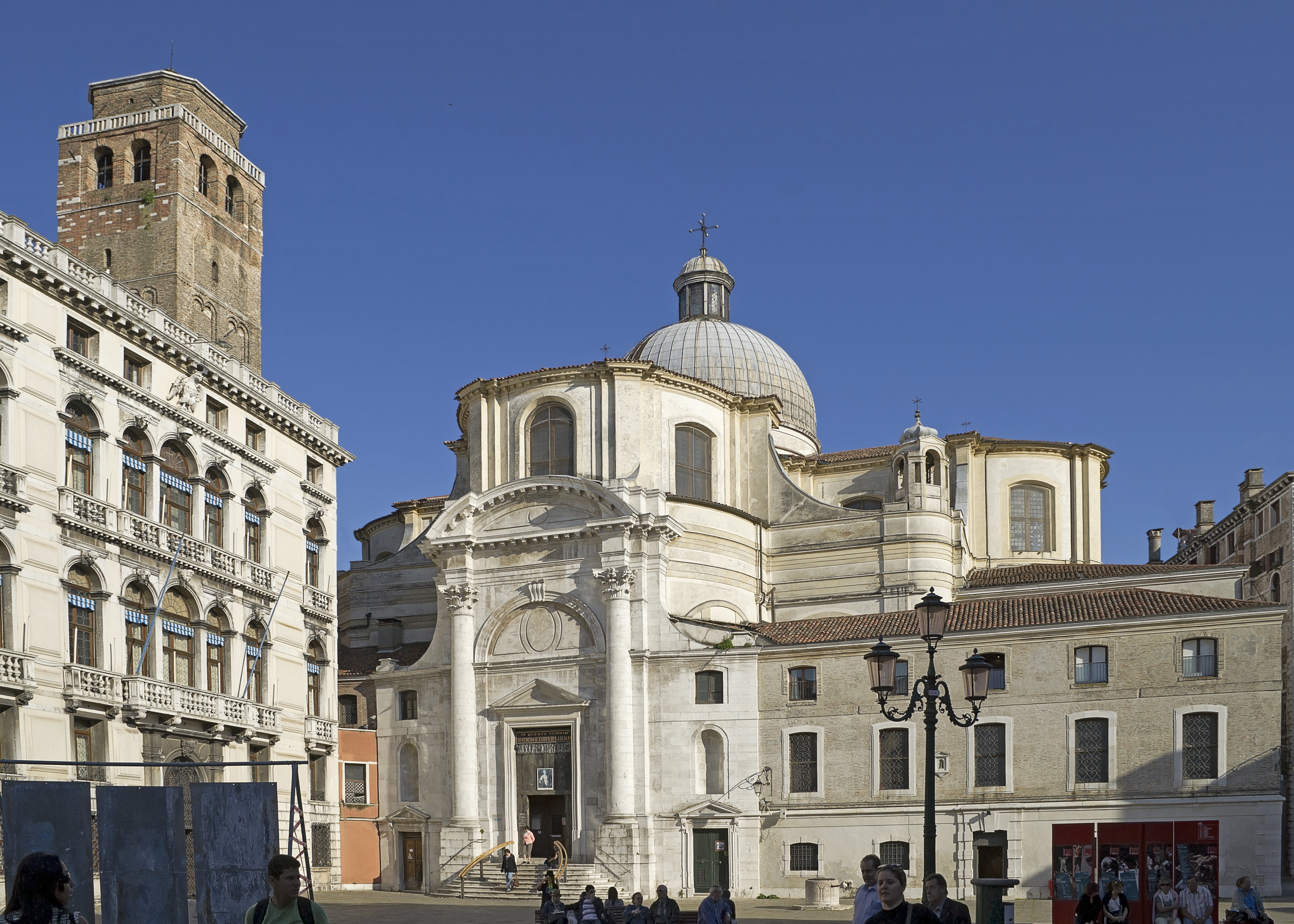
- San Geremia in Venice

- Location within Venice Location within Italy

Religion
- Affiliation: Roman Catholic
- Province: Venice

Location
- Location: Venice, Italy
- Interactive map of San Geremia
- Coordinates: 45.4426°N 12.3253°E

Architecture
- Completed: 11th century

San Geremia is a church in Venice, northern Italy, located in the sestiere of Cannaregio. The apse of the church faces the Grand Canal (Venice), between the Palazzo Labia and the Palazzo Flangini. The edifice is popular as the seat of the cult of Saint Lucy of Syracuse, whose remains are housed inside.

== History ==
The first church was erected here in the 11th century, and was later rebuilt on several occasions. In 1206 it is mentioned to house the remains of St. Magnus of Oderzo (died 670), who had taken refuge in this area from the Lombards.

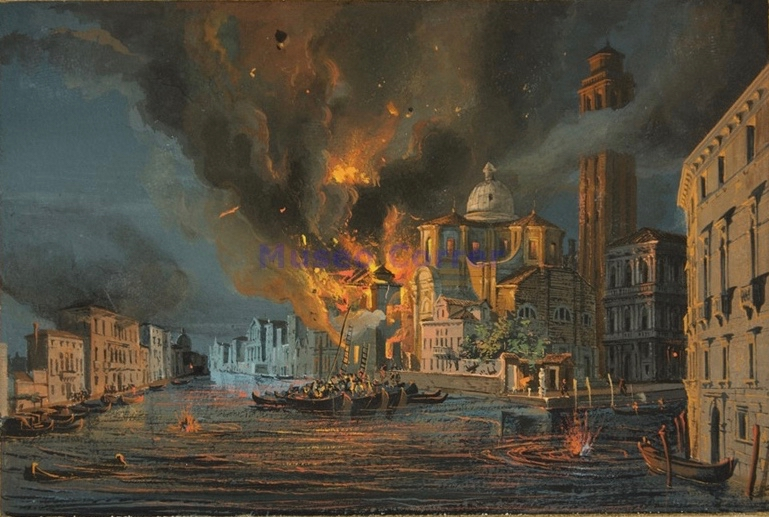
The church of San Geremia in Venice hit by the Austrian bombardment of 1849.

A first rebuilding was held under doge Sebastiano Ziani, the new church being consecrated in 1292. The current edifice dates from 1753, designed by Carlo Corbellini; the façade is from 1861. The brickwork bell tower (probably dating from the 12th century) has two thin Romanesque mullioned windows at the base.

The church was damaged by Austrian shelling during their successful siege of the city in 1849 during the First Italian War of Independence.

On 27 June 1998, a minor fire broke out, lightly damaging the church.

== Interior ==
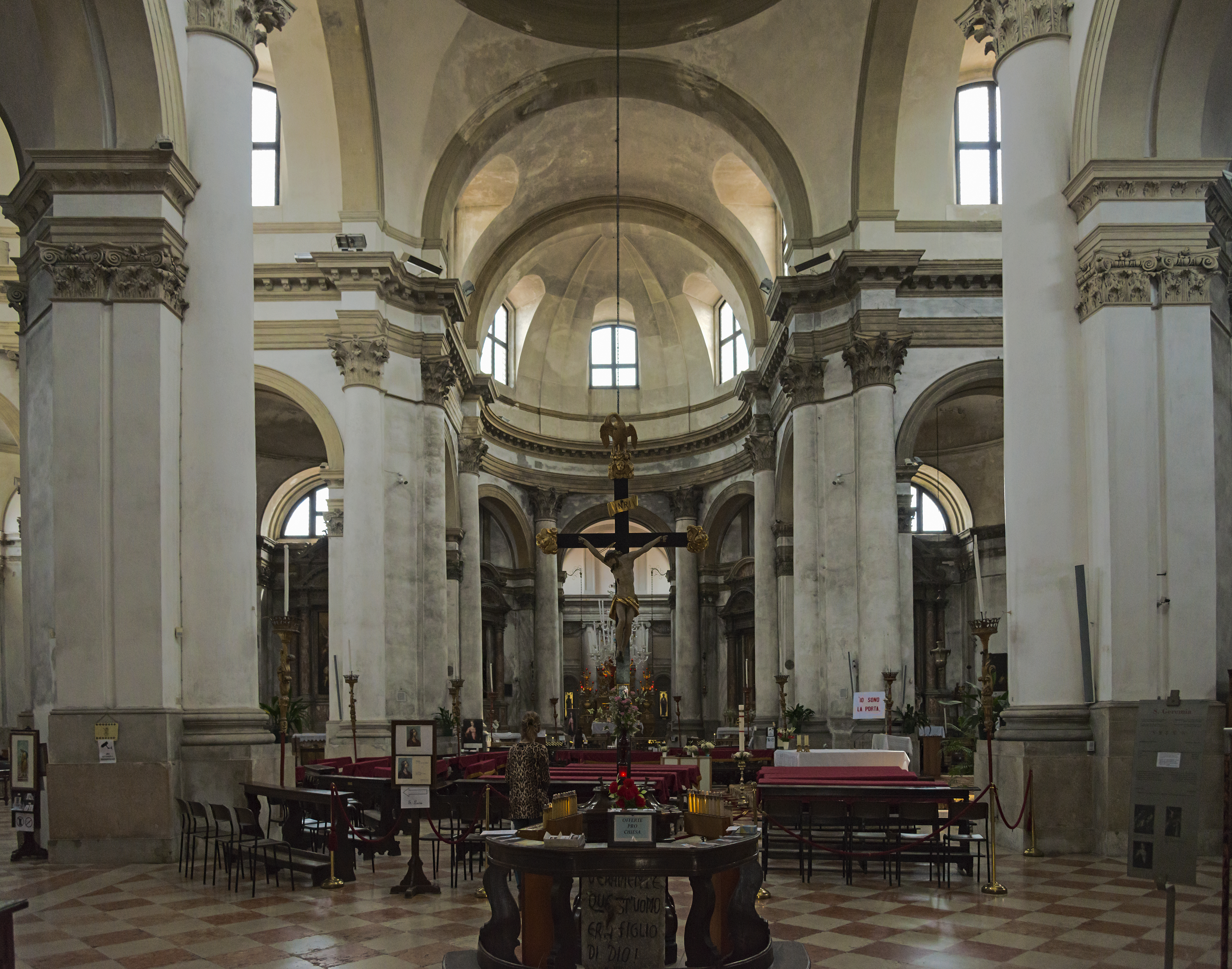
San Geremia interior

The interior has rather sober walls. The altar and its presbytery are notable, with two statues of St. Peter and St. Jeremy Apostle (1798) by Giovanni Ferrari. The altar background has a monochrome fresco by Agostino Mengozzi Colonna depicting Two Angels uphold the Globe. A work by Palma the Younger (The Virgin at the Incoronation of Venice by St. Magnus) decorates the fourth altar. The church contains statuary by Giovanni Maria Morlaiter (Madonna of the Rosary) and Giovanni Marchiori (Immaculate Conception).

The church is object of pilgrimages and wide devotion for the presence of the relics of Saint Lucy, which were carried here in 1861, when the nearby church dedicated to her was demolished. In 1955 Angelo Roncalli, future Pope John XXIII and then Patriarch of Venice, had a silver mask put on the saint's face to protect it from dust.

The saint's body was stolen on November 7, 1981, but was restored in December of the same year without any ransom. The police discovered the relics outside Venice in a nylon bag on her Feastday, Dec. 13.

== Gallery ==
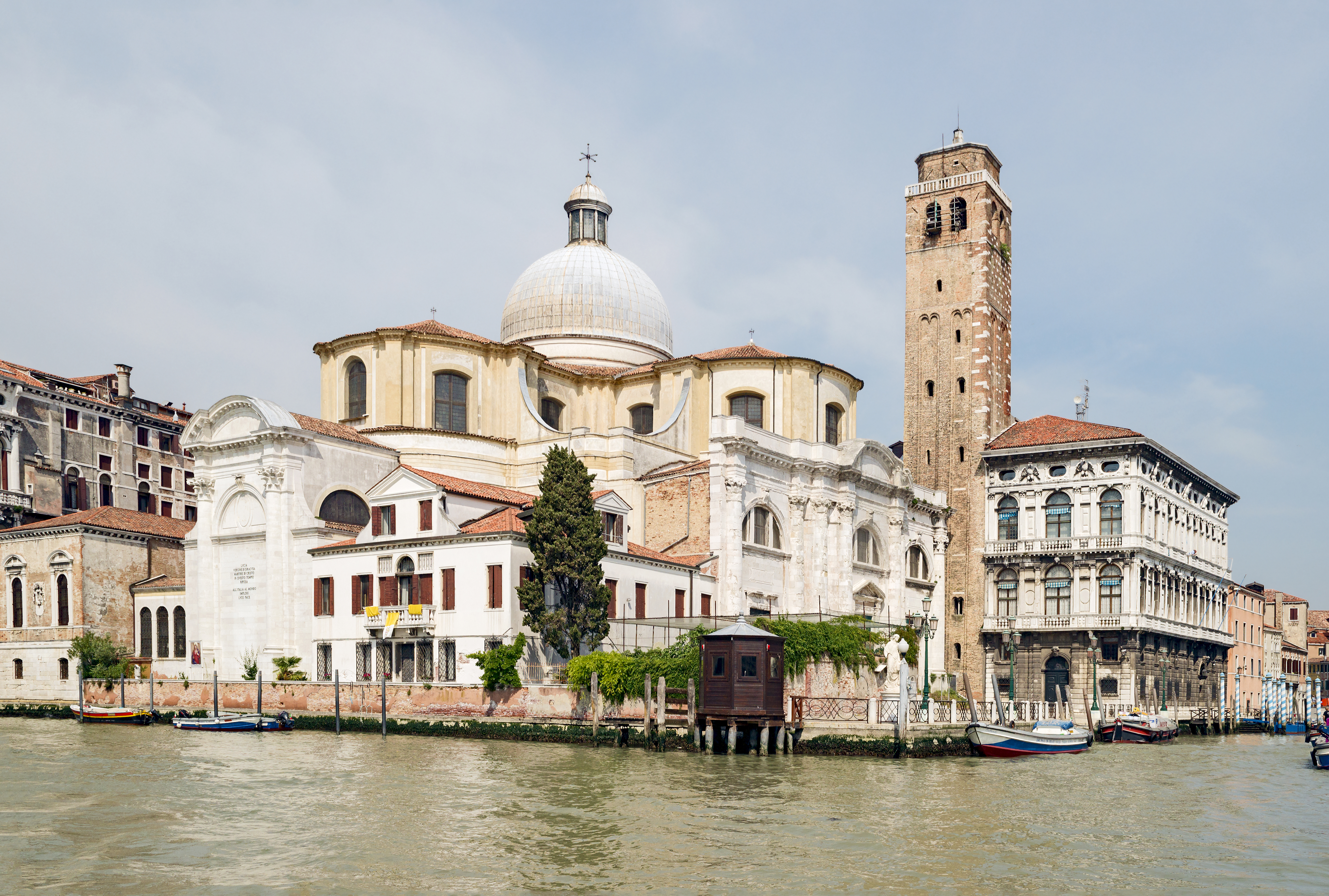
Church San Geremia from Grand Canal

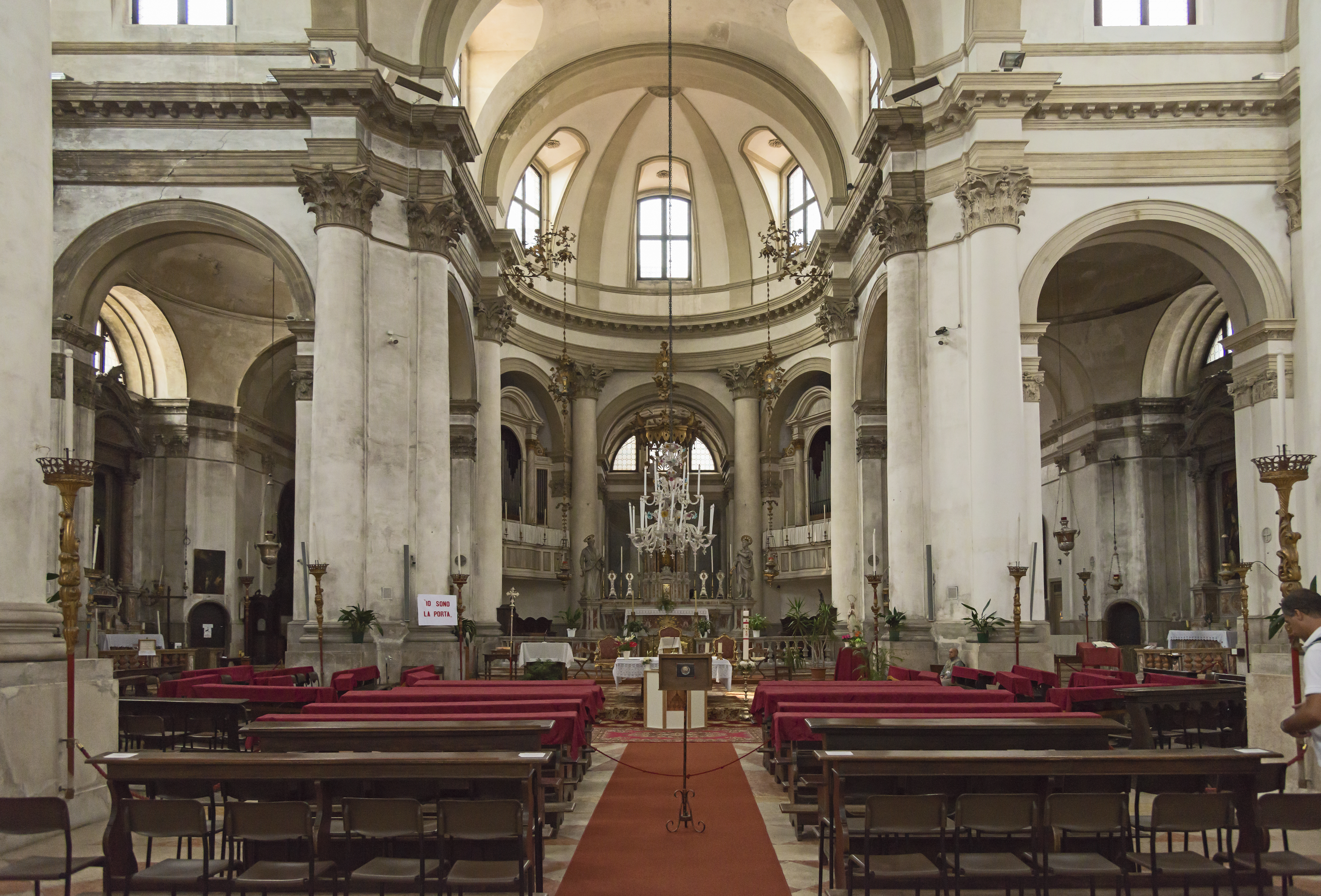
Interior

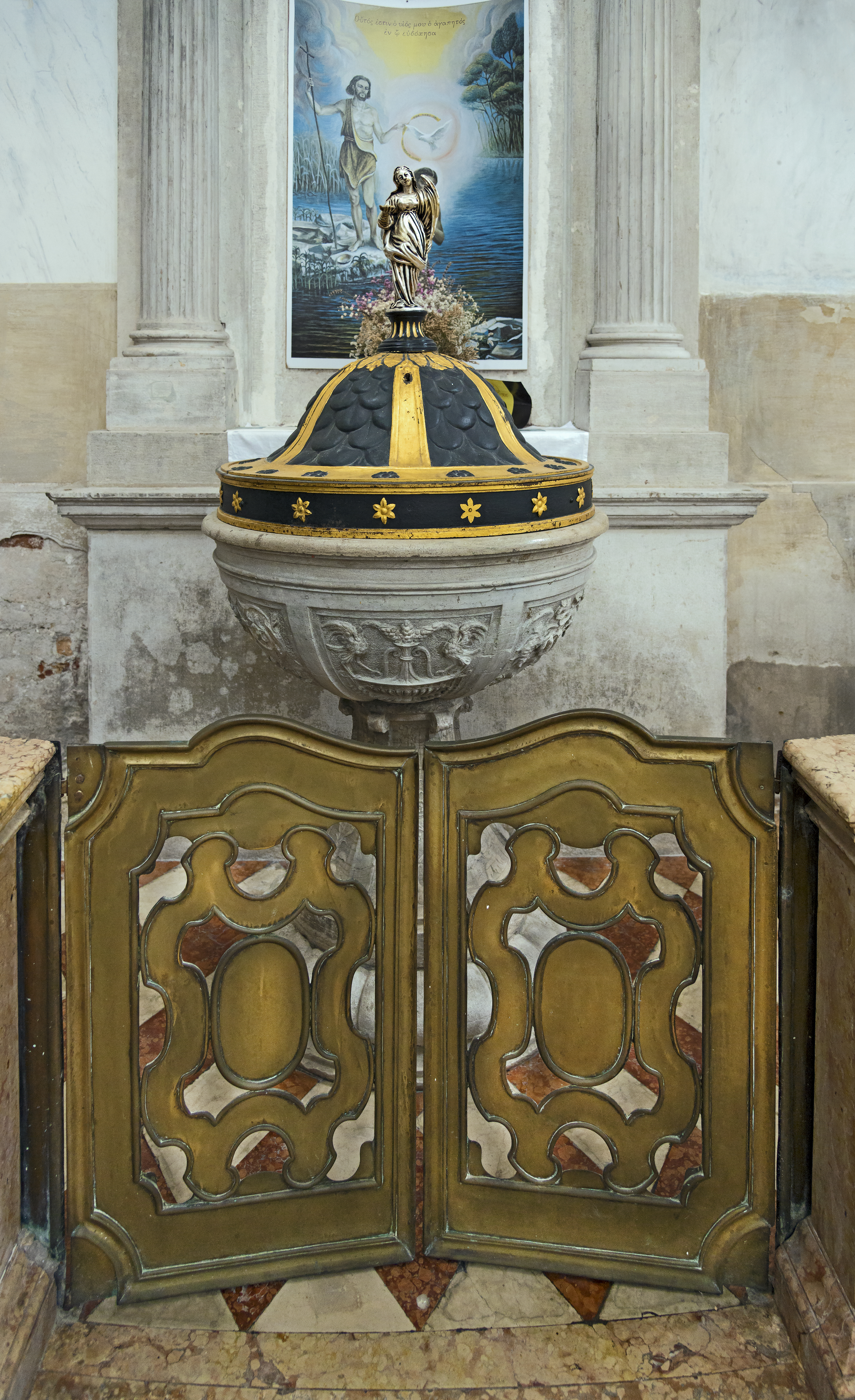
Font

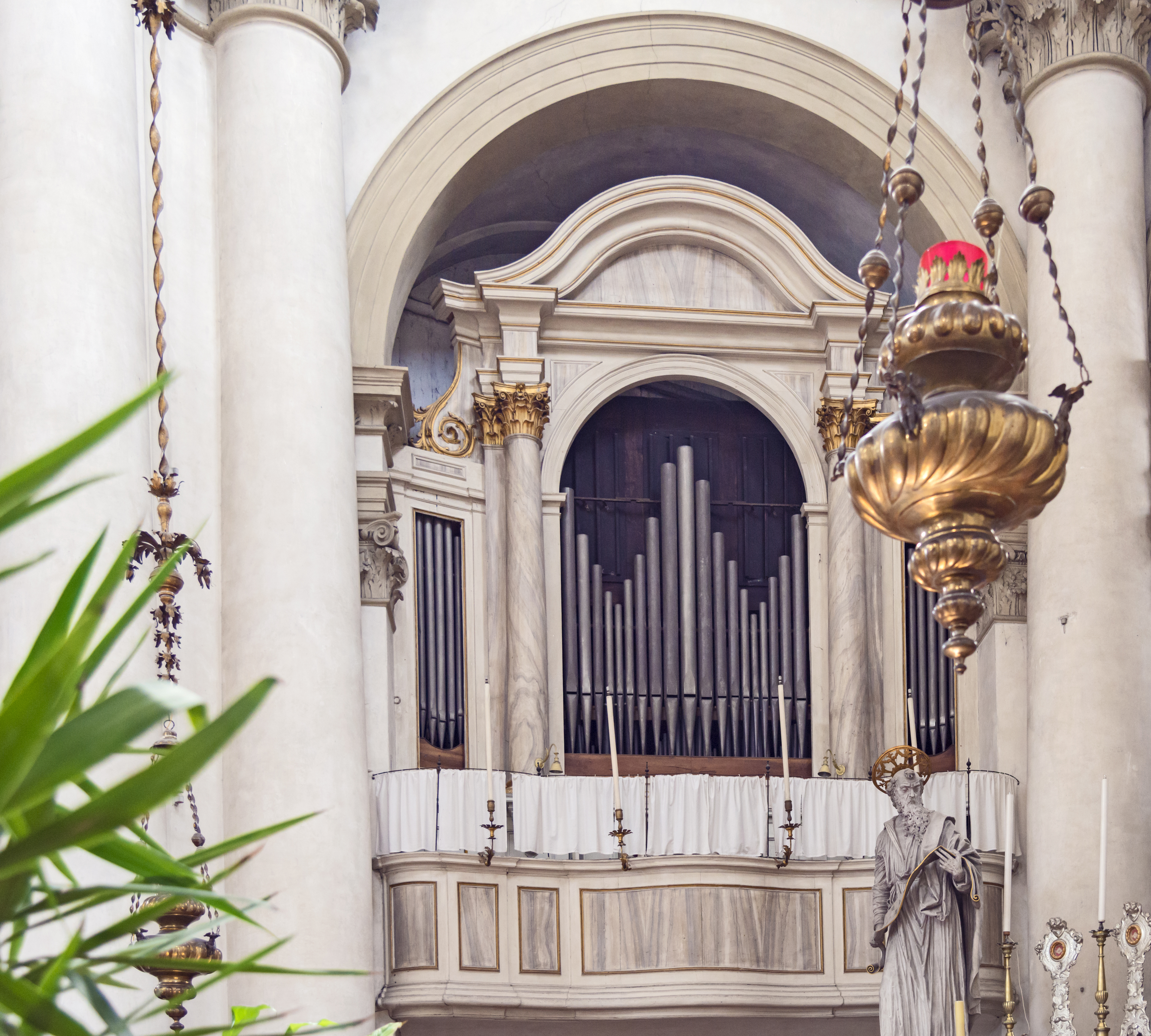
Left organ

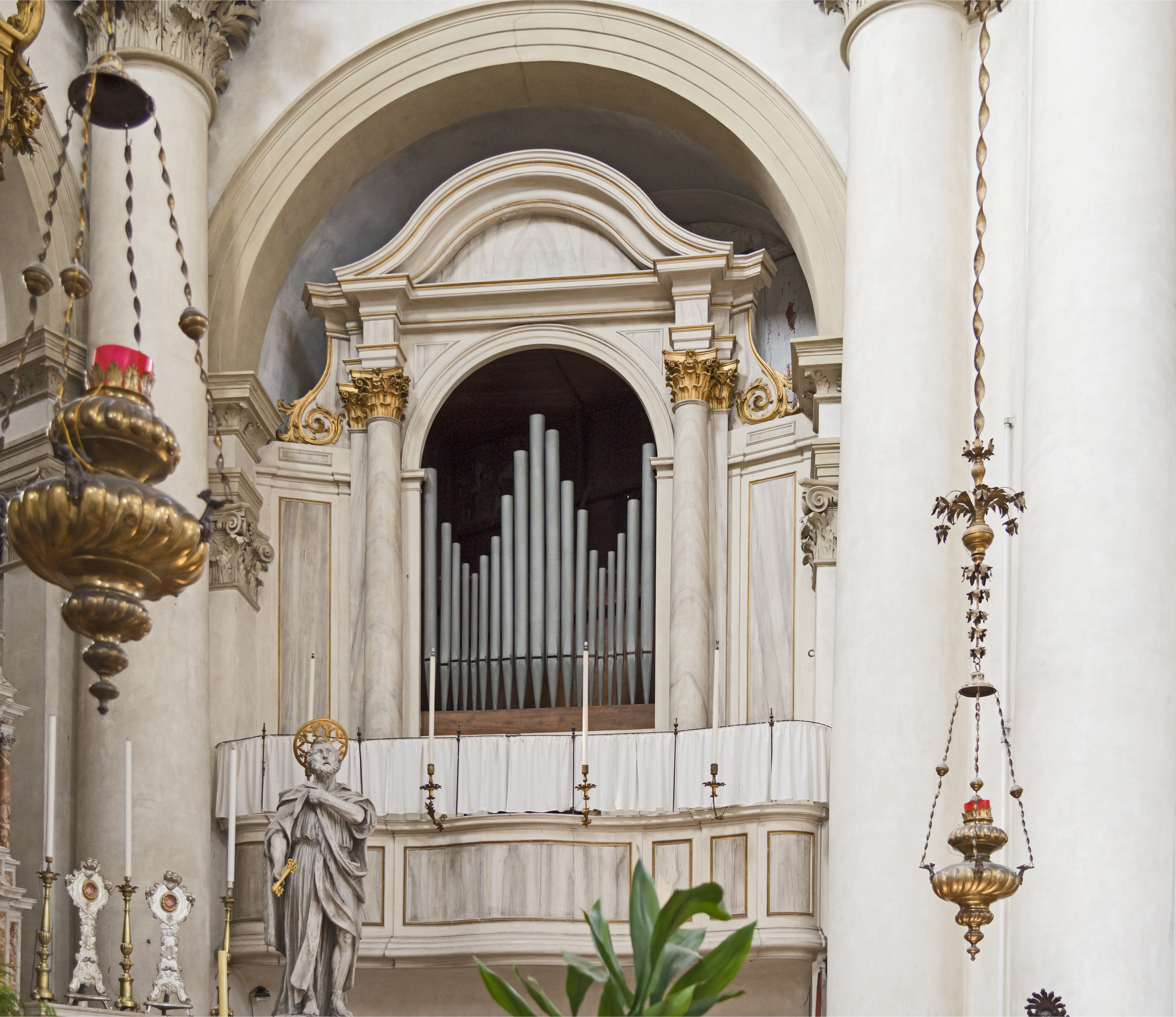
Right organ

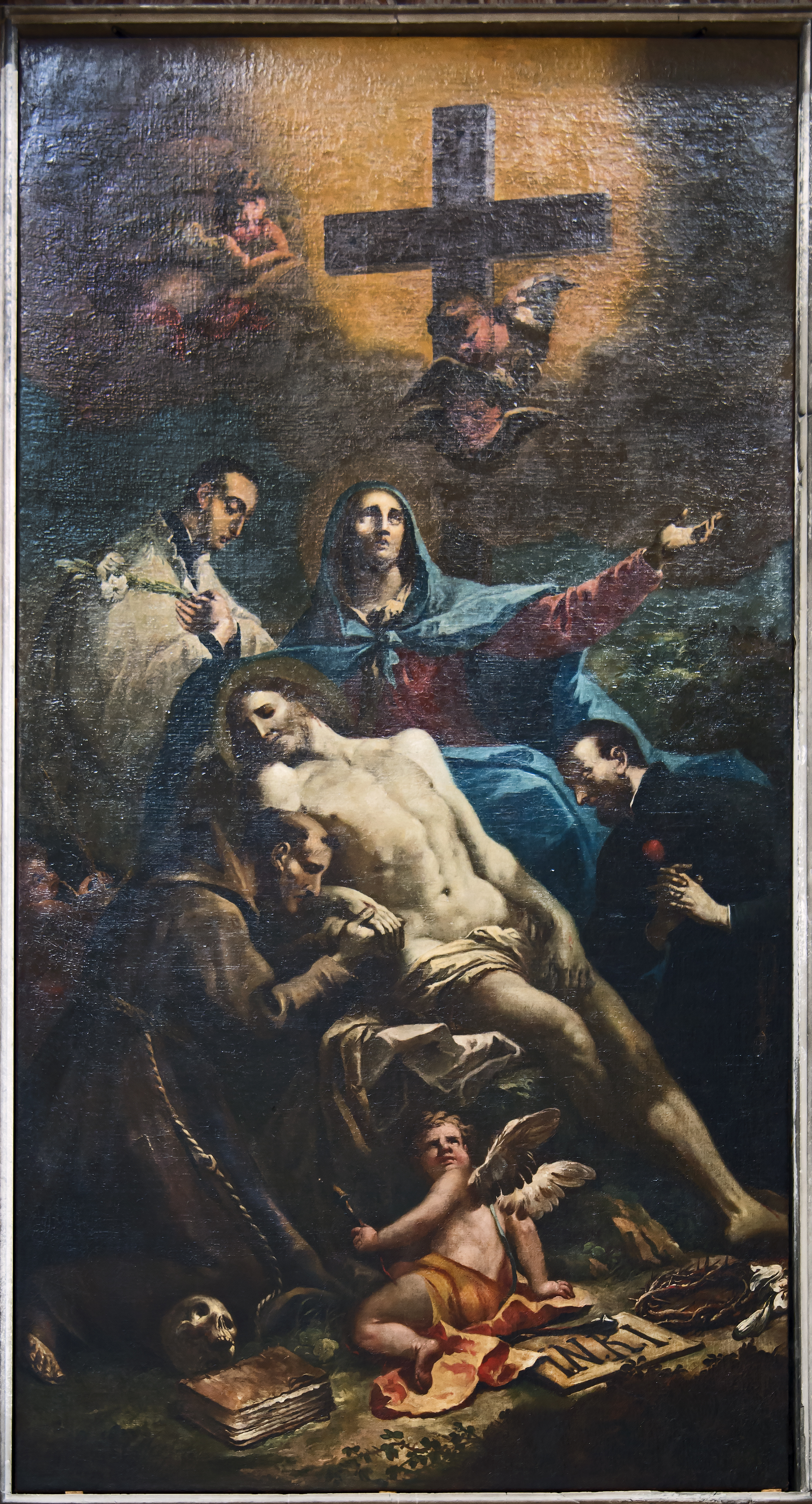
Deposition by Agostino Ugolini

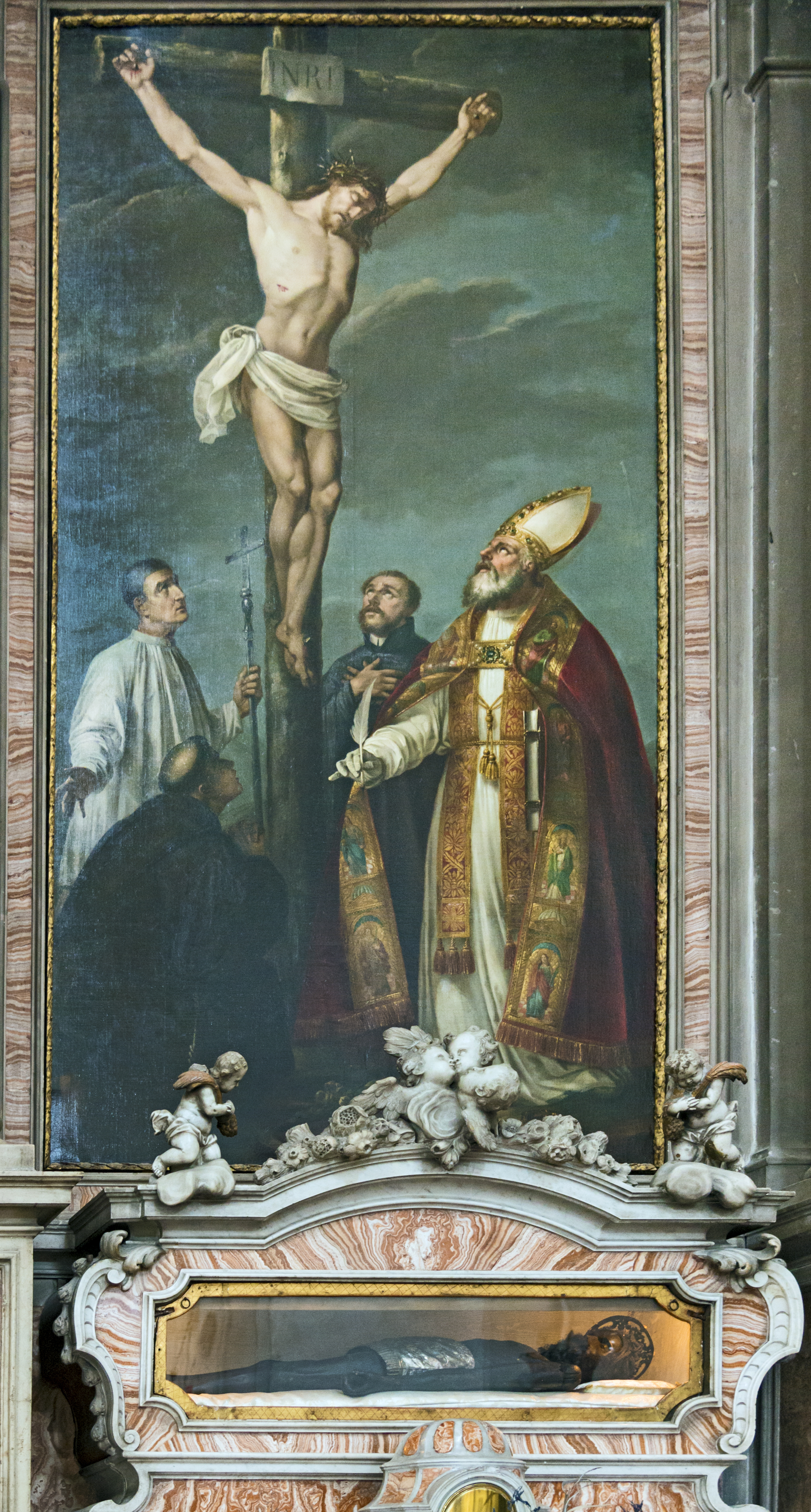
Crucifixion with Saints by Sebastiano Santi

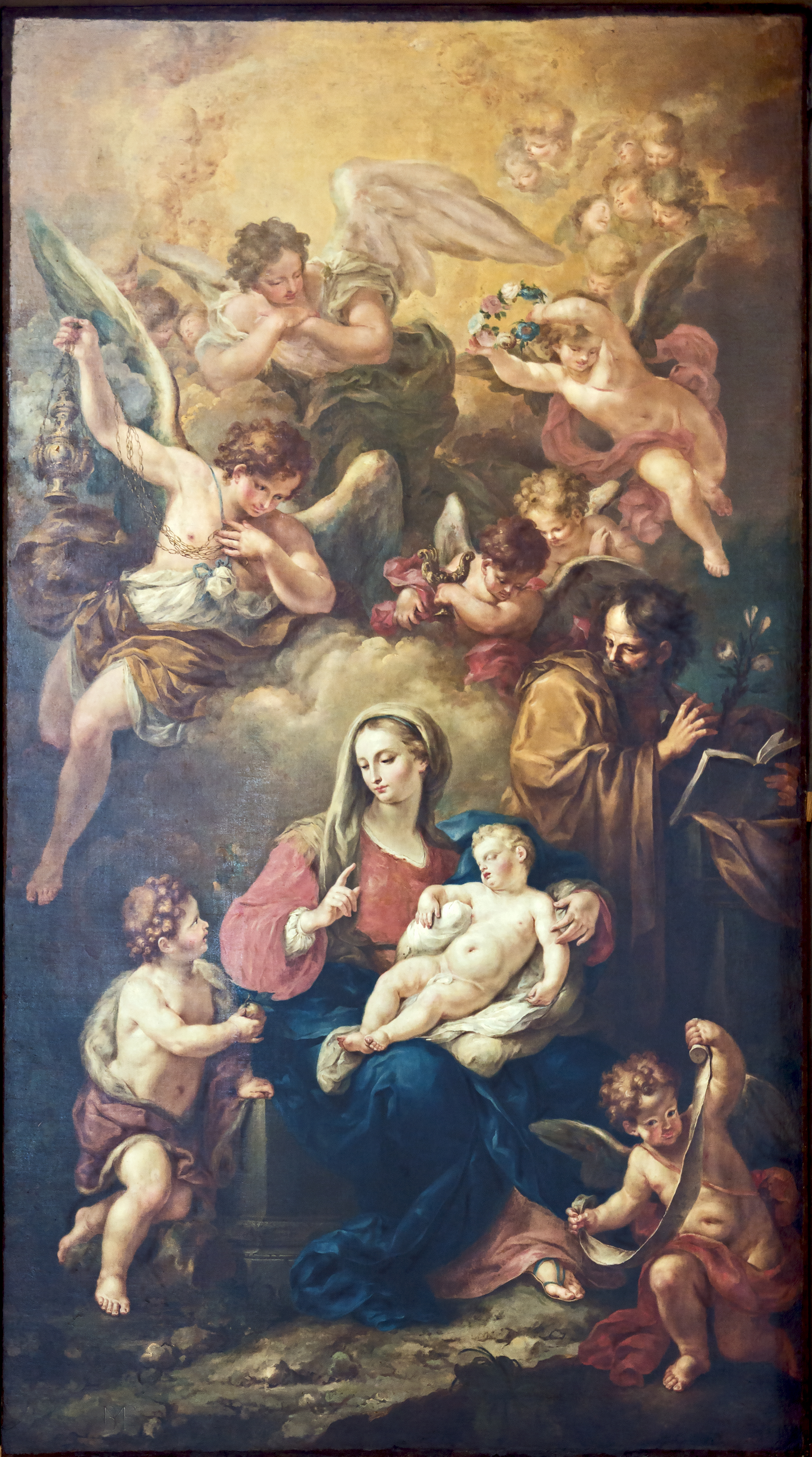
Holy family by Giovanni Battista Mengardi

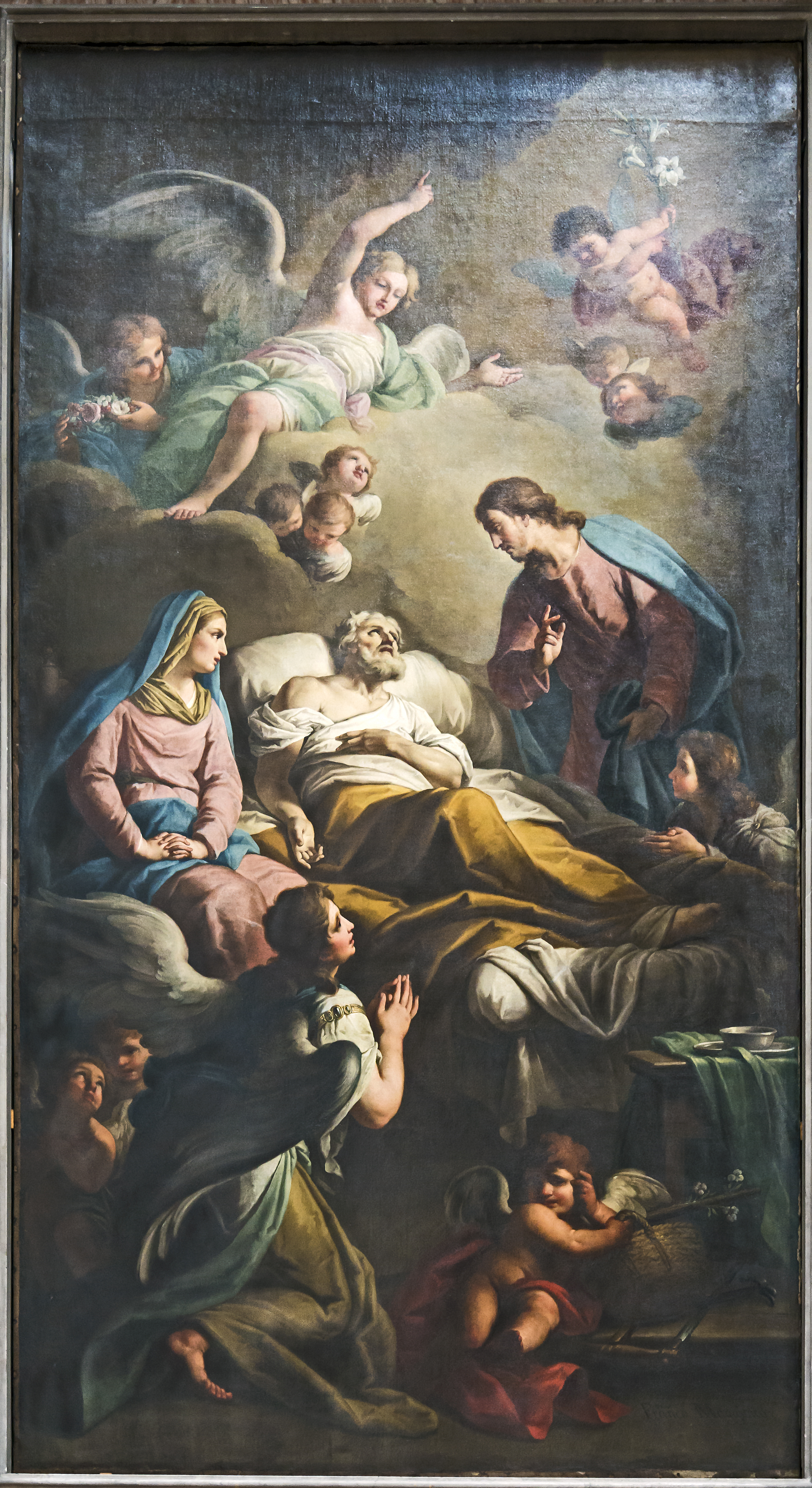
Death of St Joseph by Francesco Maggiotto

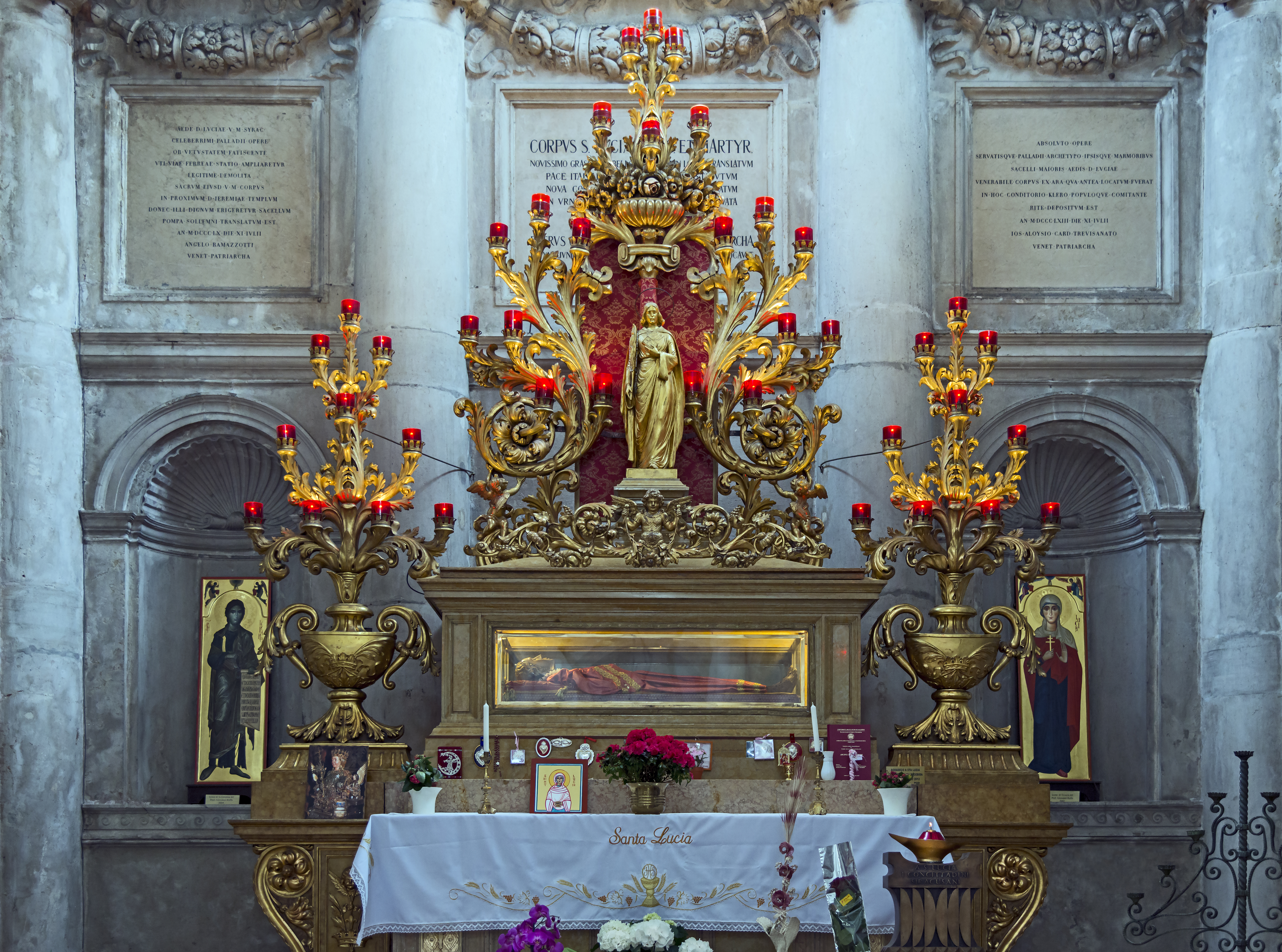
Relics of St. Lucia
