= Santa Lucìa alla Badìa, Siracusa =

Deconsecrated church in Sicily, Italy

Santa Lucia alla Badia
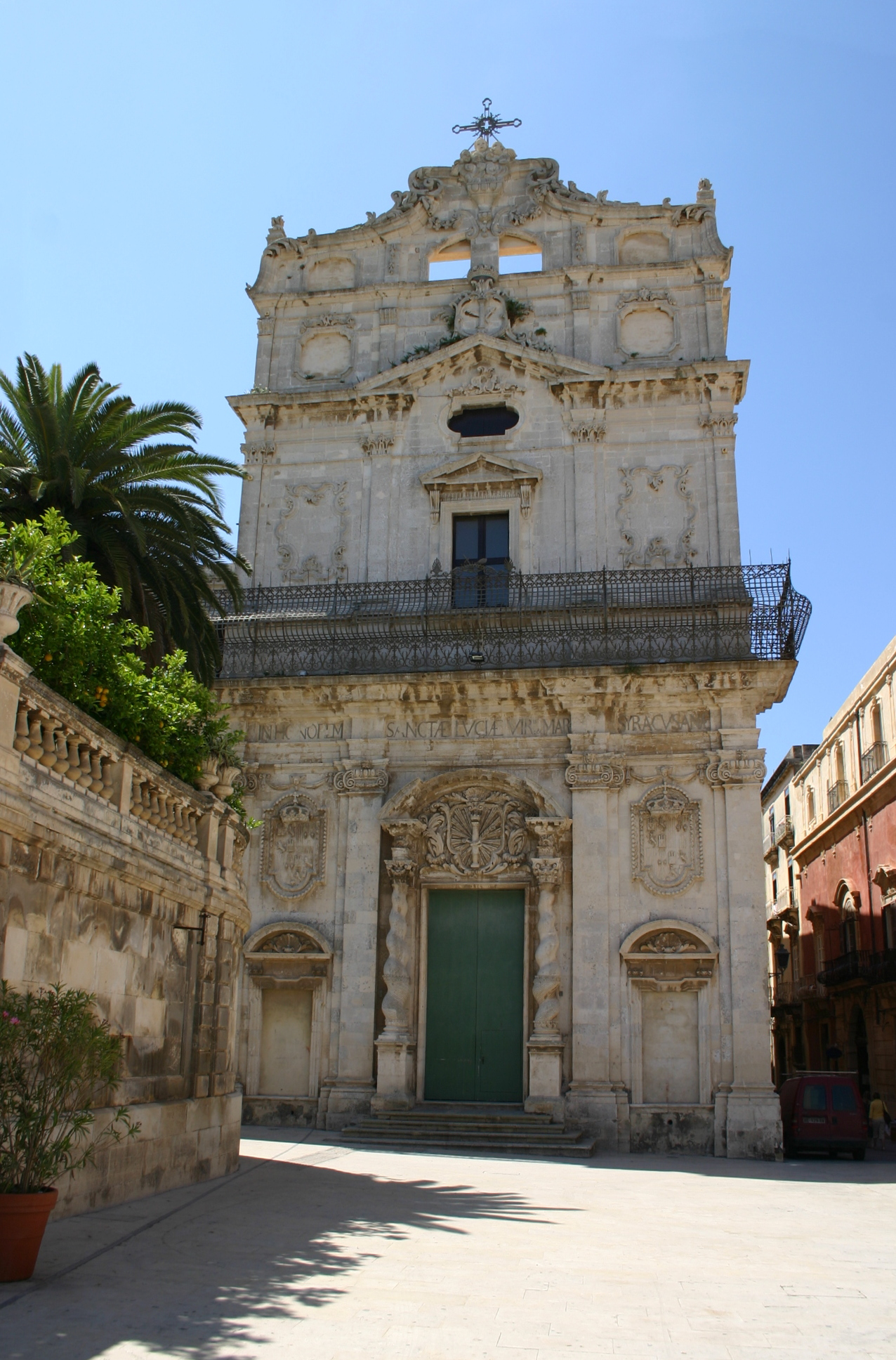
- Façade toward Piazza Duomo

Religion
- Affiliation: deconsecrated Catholic Church
- Province: Siracusa

Location
- Location: Siracusa, Italy 37°03′31″N 15°17′37″E
- Interactive map of Santa Lucia alla Badia

Architecture
- Type: Church
- Style: Baroque
- Completed: 1703

Santa Lucia alla Badia is a baroque-style, Roman Catholic Church, now deconsecrated, located on the south corner of the piazza duomo, located to the south of the façade of the Cathedral of Syracuse), located in the island of Ortigia, the historic city center of Siracusa in Sicily, Italy. The church building and adjacent former monastery is now used for special exhibitions and functions.

== Description ==
A church and monastery at the site, attached to a female Benedictine monastery was present by the mid-15th century, putatively with the patronage or Isabella I of Castile. It was supposedly built at the site at which St Lucy was forced into prostitution. Documentation is lacking as to whether the church and monastery predates the reign of Isabelle, and may have only been refurbished by her.

The monastery and church were destroyed by the 1693 Sicily Earthquake. Originally, the façade likely was oriented on an east-west orientation, overlooking the narrow Via Picherali, but when the present church was reconstructed between 1695 and 1703 and attributed to the architect Luciano Caracciolo. The façade was transferred to face the piazza Duomo, the site of more religious celebrations. Caracciolo may have only played an initial role in the construction of the first story.

The structure of the church was heavily damaged during the Second World War, and various restorations took place in the 20th century. The tile flooring of the nave was replaced in 1970.

The flat tall façade is decorated just above the main portal with symbols of the martyred patron of Siracusa, St Lucy; these include a column, a sword, a palm, and a crown. To the sides, above two flanking niches, are the coat of arms of the Spanish monarchy during the rule of Philip V in 1705, including the symbols of the kingdoms of Leon (lion), Castilla (castle), Aragon (vertical stripes); and Sicily (eagles and stripes); the shield resembles that used by John of Austria. The entrance is flanked by two spiraling Solomonic columns. The frieze reads IN HONOREM/SANCTAE LUCIAE VIR.& MAR. SIRACUSANA.

On the second floor is an elaborate metal balcony from where the cloistered nuns could view processions and celebrations in the piazza without mingling with the outside world. The nuns used to release doves from this balcony during the celebrations of Saint Lucy on the first Sunday of May. The original metal balcony was removed from the church during World War II. The metal cross once at the top of the structure was removed due to its instability.

The church suffered much damage during the Second World War, and has been reconstructed to match the prior late Baroque interiors. A single nave leads to an apse with dome. The nave ceiling is frescoed (1783) with the Triumph of Santa Lucia by Deodato Guinaccia.

The painting by Caravaggio, depicting the Burial of St Lucy, originally painted for and located in the small church of Santa Lucia al Sepolcro, located on the mainland, was transiently relocated here, but since then has been located elsewhere.

At the main altar is a painting depicting the Martyrdom of Santa Lucia, also recalling a miracle that occurred in 1646: during a time of famine, a large crowd had gathered to pray to San Lucia, when a dove alighted on the episcopal throne, announcing the arrival of ships with food for cargo. For centuries, on the first Sunday of May, the nuns in the adjacent convent, celebrated the festival of the “Quails of Santa Lucia” (Santa Lucia delle Quaglie), where the nuns used to free doves and quails from the church’s balcony. A modified ceremony is still re-enacted in the piazza del Duomo, every December during the Festa di Santa Lucia.

Other decorations inside the church include stuccoes (1705) by Biagio Bianco of Licodia, some of them gilded in the late 18th century. A reliquary made of silver was completed by Francesco Tuccio in 1726. On the right is an altarpiece by Giuseppe Reati, depicting the Miracle of St Francis of Paola (1641).

The monastery that encompassed the structures to the east and south of the church extended down to Piazzetta San Rocco. An oval parlor or locutory adjacent to the church was used by the cloistered nuns to meet with family members. A second-story connection spanning the Via delle Virgine likely implies that the building across the street was part of the cloistered monastery.
