= Vicente P. Trinidad National High School =

- Mataas na Paaralang Pambansa ng Vicente P. Trinidad
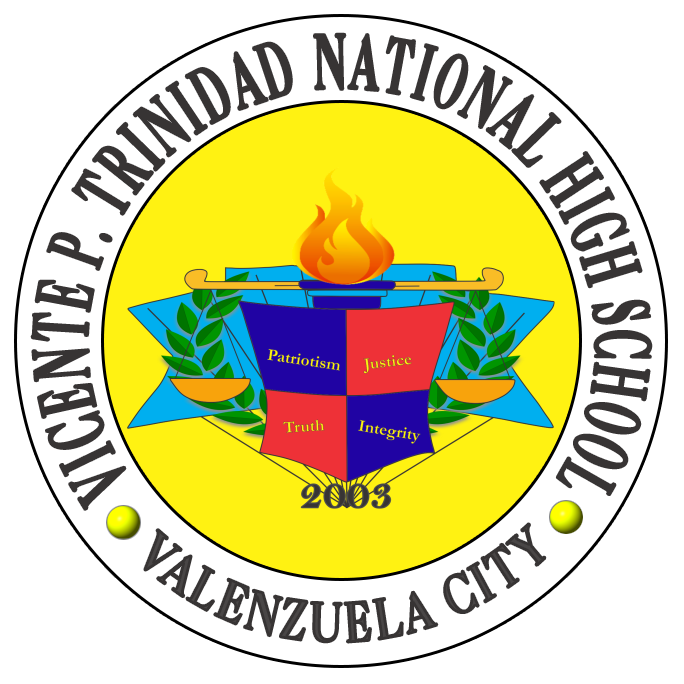

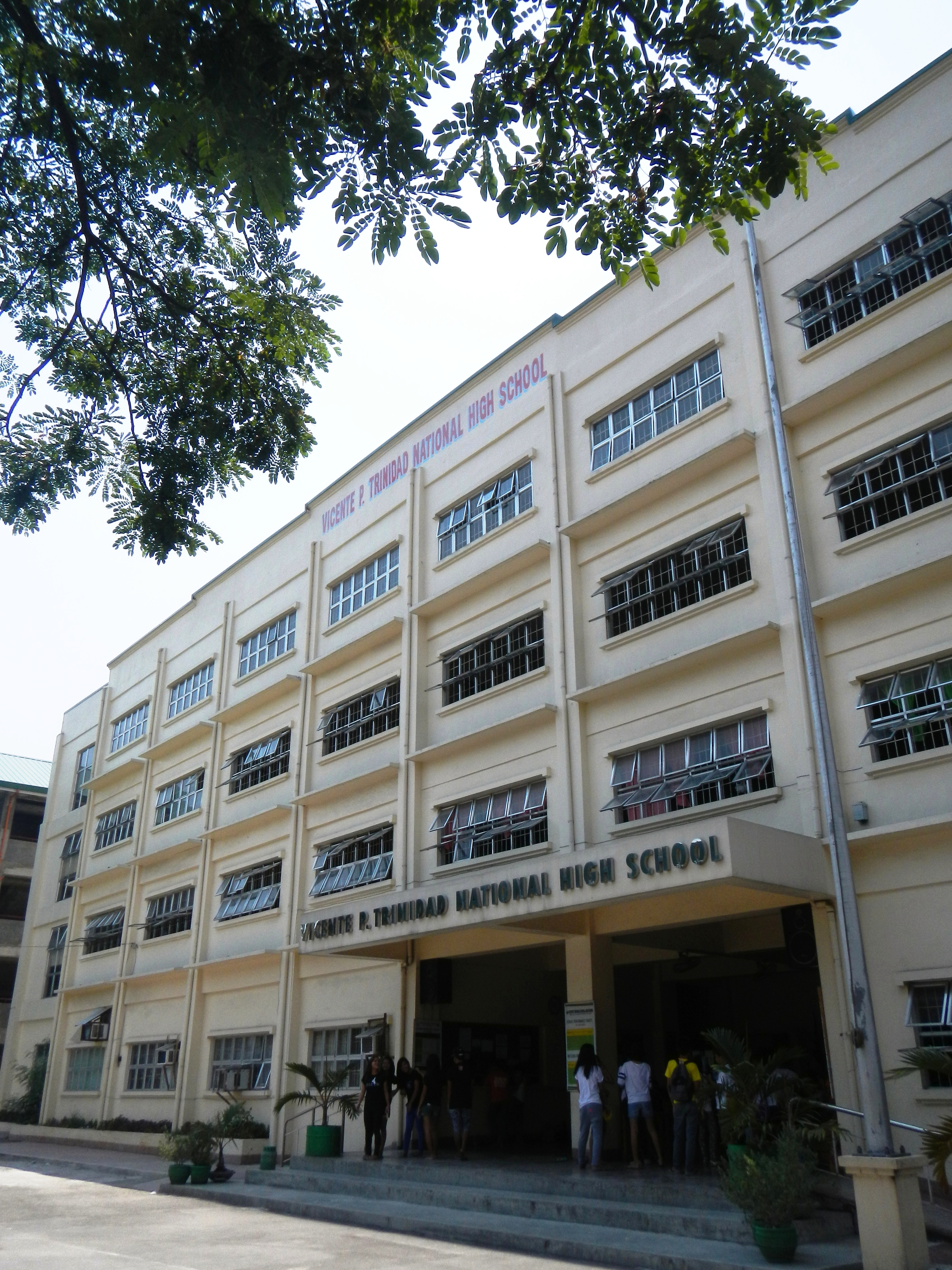
- Facade

Location
- Ruby St., Sta. Lucia Village Phase 5, Punturin; Valenzuela City; Philippines
- Coordinates: 14°44′23.6″N 120°58′59.4″E

Information
- Type: Public high school
- Motto: Matatag na Pag-Angat
- Established: 2003
- Status: Open, secondary school
- Principal: Jaime S. De Vera Jr., Principal IV
- Grades: Grade 7-10 (Junior), Grades 11-12 (Senior)
- Colors: Yellow and Gray
- Nickname: VPTNHS, VP Trinidad High, Vicente,
- Affiliations: Division of City Schools–Valenzuela, Department of Education

Vicente P. Trinidad National High School, formerly Punturin National High School, is a public general high school in Valenzuela City, Philippines. It is located at Sta. Lucia Village Phase V, Punturin, Valenzuela City, Metro Manila, Philippines. It was established in 2003. It is said to be Valenzuela City's School of Performing Arts. It was formerly known as Valenzuela National High School - Punturin Annex and Punturin National High School.

== History ==
Before 2003, residents of Punturin needed to go to the next barangay, Lawang Bato, to get high school education. Punturin residents and to-be high school students see this as a stumbling block because of the distance to their homes. Then principal of Punturin Elementary School, Dr. Darino Elizaga, envisioned converting elementary school annex into a high school.

This was then located at Yardley street, Sta. Lucia Village Phase III. The lot was donated by the Brangay Council of Punturin during the time of Barangay Captain Nicanor S. Faustino to the Department of Education, with Punturin Elementary School as the beneficiary.

He then discussed his plan to then Schools Division Superintendent Dr. Aquilina Rivas. A consensus was created that ease of access to education must be achieved, as mandated by RA 9155 or the Governance in Basic Education Act. Thus, Dr. Rivas backed the plan for an integrated school.

In a move to discuss the matter, Dr. Elizaga conducted a consultation meeting with the school General Parents-Teachers Association president Domingo R. Mariano with the officers and students together with the parents of the 106 members of the graduating class of 2003. It resulted in the creation of a petition signed by the attendees calling for the creation of a high school.

Supporting the cause, Punturin barangay council, headed by the late Punong Barangay Vicente “Benjie” P. Trinidad passed barangay resolution 09–03, series of 2003, requesting permission to the Department of Education Secretary Edilberto de Jesus to create a high school.

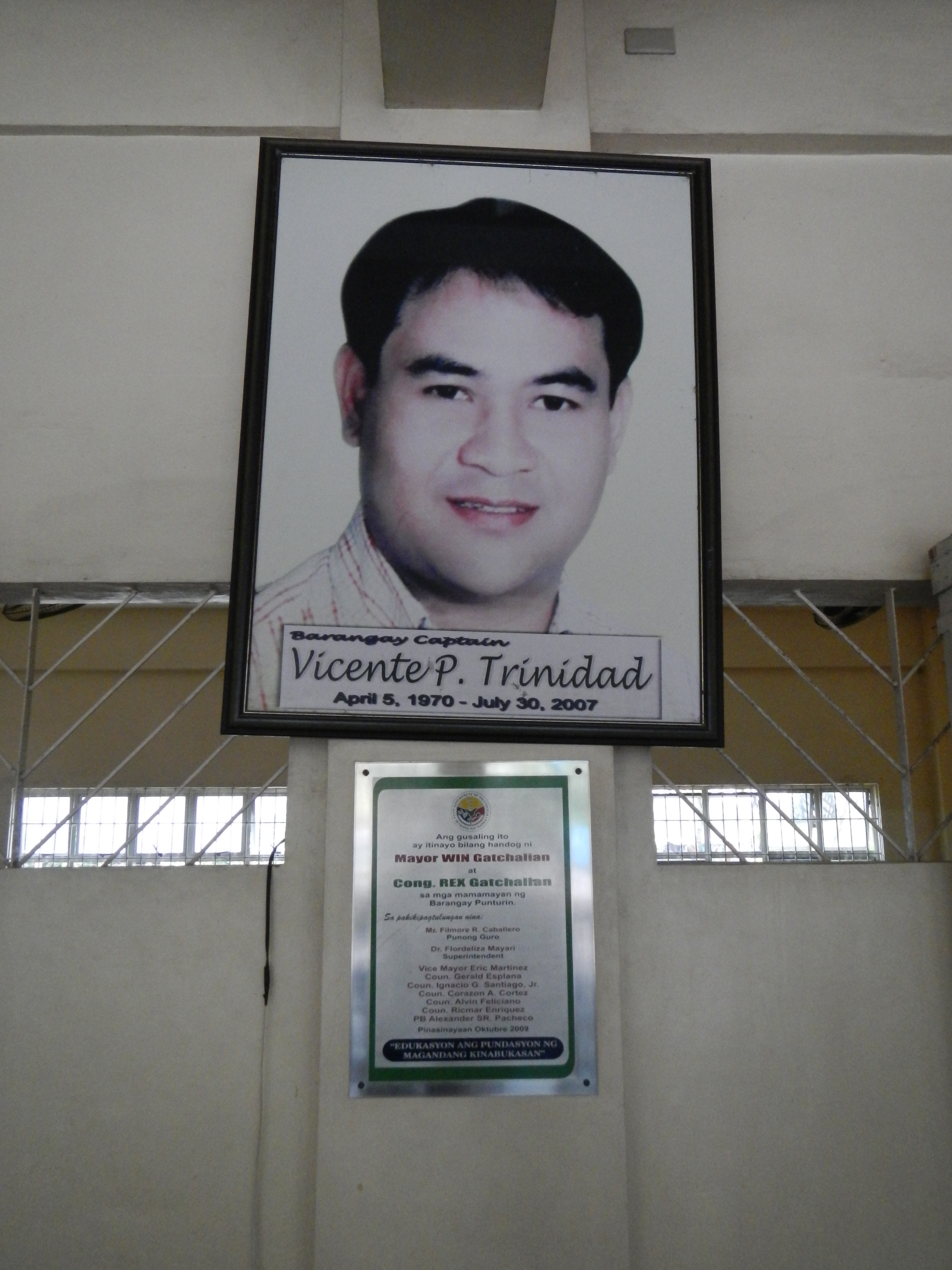
Slain Punong Barangay Vicente “Benjie” P. Trinidad

All effort paid off when then Secretary de Jesus approved the request, creating Valenzuela National High School – Punturin Annex. Dr. Elizaga was appointed officer in charge of the school annex. With Dr. Elizaga, six teachers were also assigned at Punturin annex.

Aside from their teaching load, the pioneer teachers served as academic coordinator, guidance counselor, clinician, librarian, property custodian and canteen manager. On its opening in school year 2003–2004, 341 students enrolled in this humble school.

In 2005, Filmore R. Caballero was designated as the officer-in-charge of Punturin annex, then promoted to school principal the following year. From Valenzuela National High School - Punturin annex, it became an independent Punturin National High School as enacted by then NCR regional director Teresita Domalanta on November 6, 2007.

However, Kapitan Benjie, as he is known to all residents of Punturin, did not see the birth of a separate Punturin High School. On July 30, 2007, two gunmen approached him during the weekly flag ceremony at the barangay hall and shot him on his nape and face. He died on the spot. On his honor, Punturin National High School was renamed Vicente P. Trinidad National High School by virtue of RA 9659, passed by the Congress on July 17, 2009.

== Succession of school heads ==
2003-2004 - Dr. Darino Elizaga

2004-2014 - Filmore R. Caballero

2014-2015 - Grace Pascua-Stanton

2015-2017 - Lagrimas B. Bayle

2017-2018 - Dr. Victoria D. Altoveros

2018-2019 - Dr. Jonathan O. Lagdamen

2019-2020 - Dr. Christopher J. Delino

February–October 2020 - Dr. Floramante J. De Guzman

October 2020-February 13, 2026 - Alvin Patrick Q. Peñaflorida

February 13, 2026-Incumbent - Jaime S. De Vera Jr.

== School administration ==
School Head: Jaime S. De Vera Jr.
