= Santa Lucia, Venice =

Church in Venice, Italy

Coordinates: 45.4415°N 12.32237°E

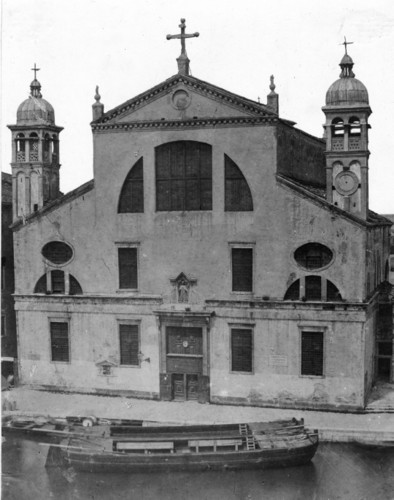
The church shortly before its destruction in 1861.

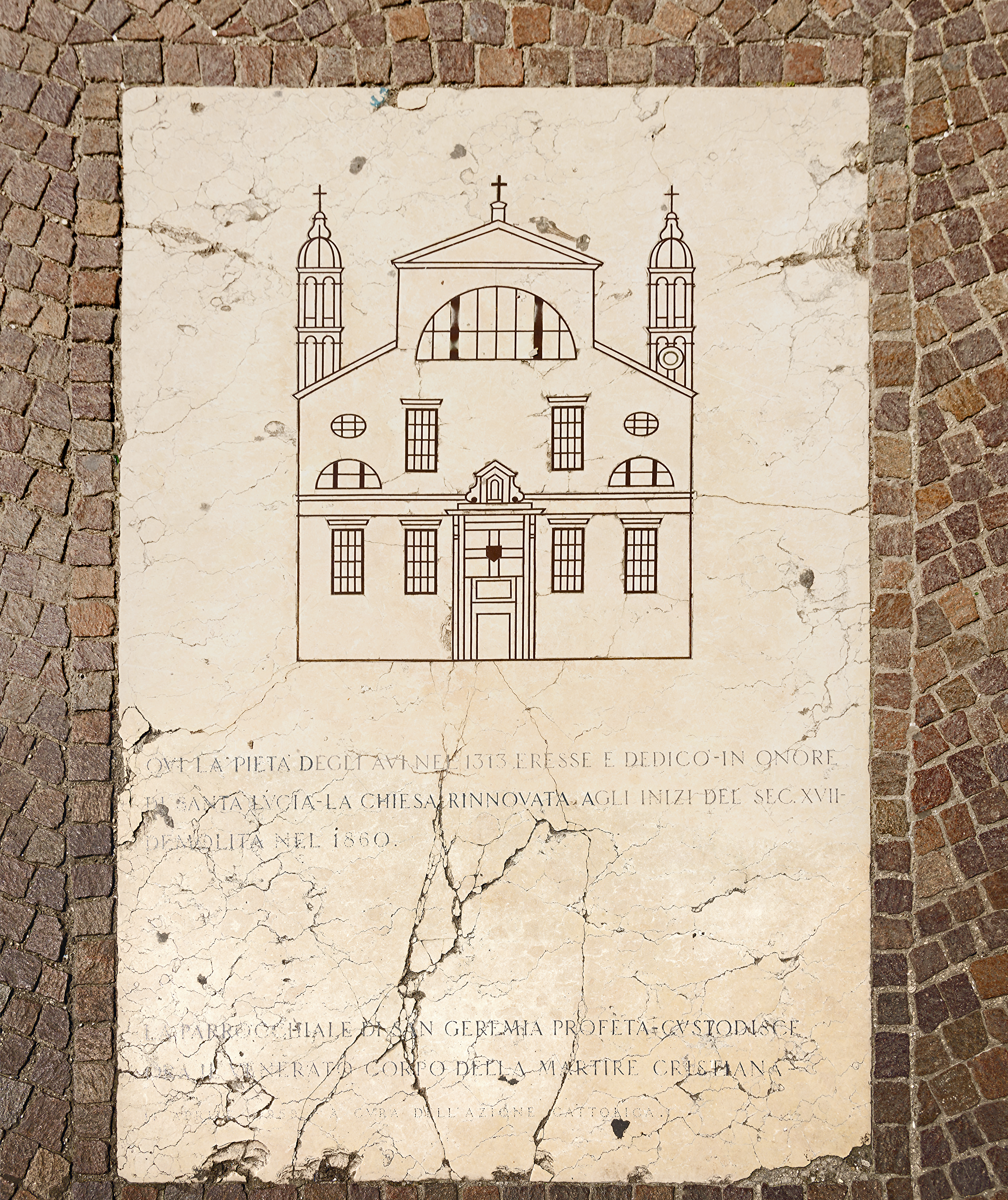
Memorial plaque on the location of the Santa Lucia church.

Santa Lucia was a church in Venice, northern Italy, which was demolished in 1861.

== History ==
According to Jacopo Sansovino, the church was founded in 1192 as a local parish dedicated to the Annunciation of Mary. According to the tradition, it changed name in 1279 after the drowning of some pilgrims going to venerate the body of St. Lucy, stolen by the Venetians in the Sack of Constantinople during the Fourth Crusade and then in the island of San Giorgio Maggiore. It was thus decided to move the corpse to the church in the main island of Venice.

In 1580, just before his death, Andrea Palladio had executed some drawings for a renovation of the interior, although the church was finished 30 years after and thus his intervention is disputed

In 1806, after the Napoleonic invasion of northern Italy, the nuns then holding the church and its convent were expelled. In 1860, when the city was connected to the mainland's railway, the complex was destined to demolition. It was replaced by the Venezia Santa Lucia railway station. The saint's body was transferred to the nearby church of San Geremia.

== Sources ==
- Musolino, Giovanni (1961). Santa Lucia a Venezia: storia, culto, arte. Ferdinando Ongania.
