= Agostino Ugolini =

Italian painter (1758–1824)

Agostino Ugolini (1758– January 8, 1824) was an Italian painter, active in a late-Baroque and early-neoclassic style.

He was born in Verona, and studied under Giovanni Battista Burato. In 1775, he was elected academic of the Academy of Fine Arts of Verona, and in 1786 became professor. He is known for his portraits and sacred subjects. Among the latter were altarpieces of the Deposition (1791) for the church of San Fermo, Verona; an Adoration of the Magi (1804) for the church of San Massimo, Verona; and a Deposition for the church of San Geremia, Venice.

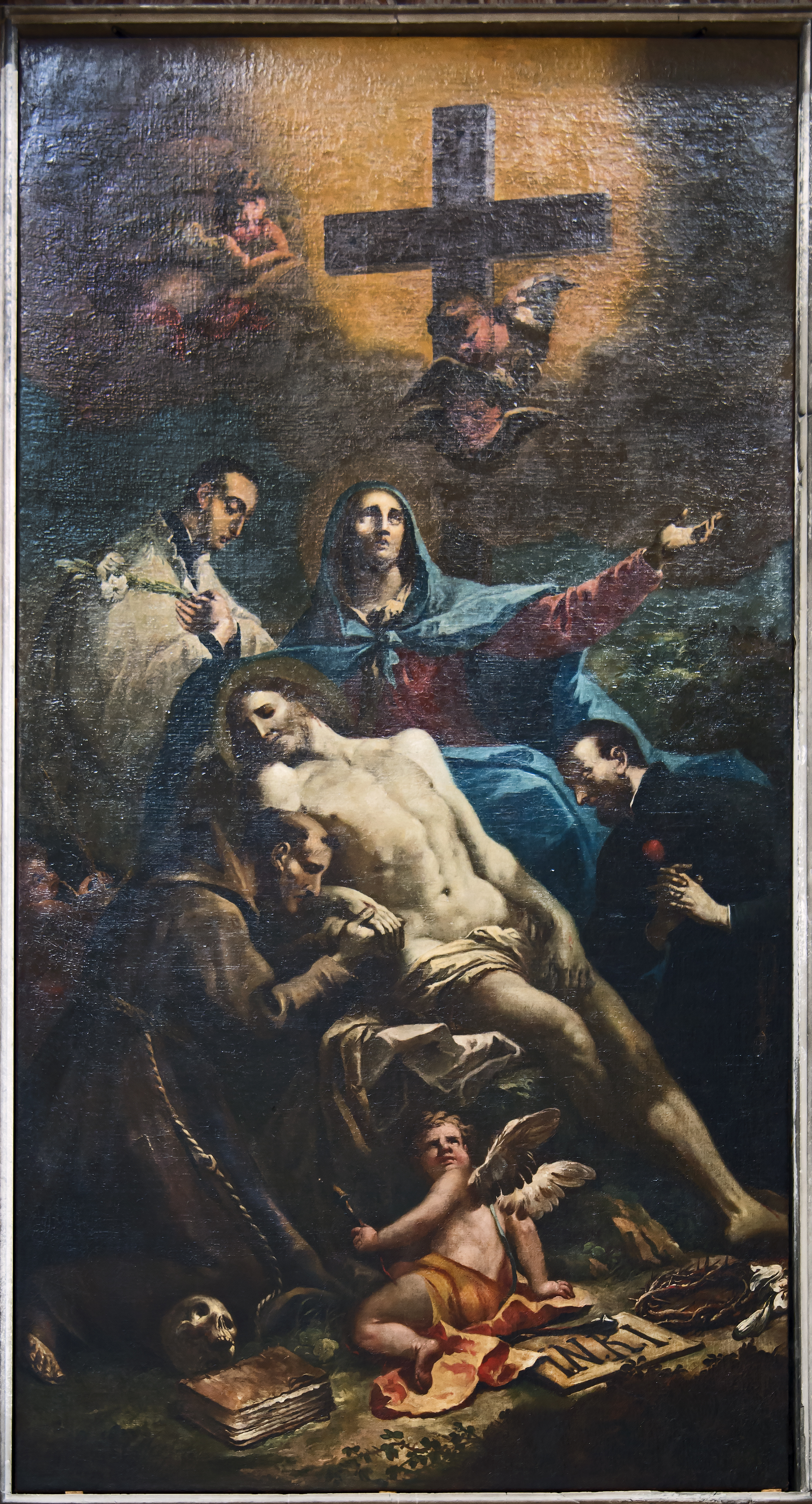
Deposition for San Geremia, Venice.

The Princeton Museum of Art has four canvases, depicting: Decapitation of John the Baptist (ca. 1803); Virgin and Child with Saints (ca. 1802); Calling of Saint Martin (circa 1804–09); and Decapitation of SS. Fermo and Rustico (circa 1800). He painted canvases for Sant'Agata in Lendinara. He also painted for churches in Ferrara, Brescia, Padua, Rovigo, and Reggio Emilia. He was buried in the cloister of San Bernardino of Verona.
