= St Gregory's School =

St Gregory's School may refer to:

- St Gregory's High School, a Catholic High School in Dhaka, Bangladesh
- St Gregory's Catholic School, Royal Tunbridge Wells, Kent, England
- St Gregory's School in Northwood, England, a predecessor of the All Saints Catholic High School, Kirkby
- St Gregory's School in Lagos, Nigeria, founded in 1884 by the Roman Catholic Archdiocese of Lagos
- St Gregory's School in Manhattan, New York, founded in 1913 by St. Gregory the Great Church (Manhattan)
- Saint Gregory's School in Loudonville, New York, a private boys elementary school in the Roman Catholic Diocese of Albany
- St Gregory's School in St. Nazianz, Wisconsin, founded in 1884 by St. Gregory's Church (St. Nazianz, Wisconsin)

== See also ==
- St. Gregory's College (disambiguation)
- St. Gregory's Academy, Elmhurst, Pennsylvania, United States
