= Punturin, Valenzuela =

Barangay in Valenzuela City, Metro Manila, Philippines

Punturin
- Barangay
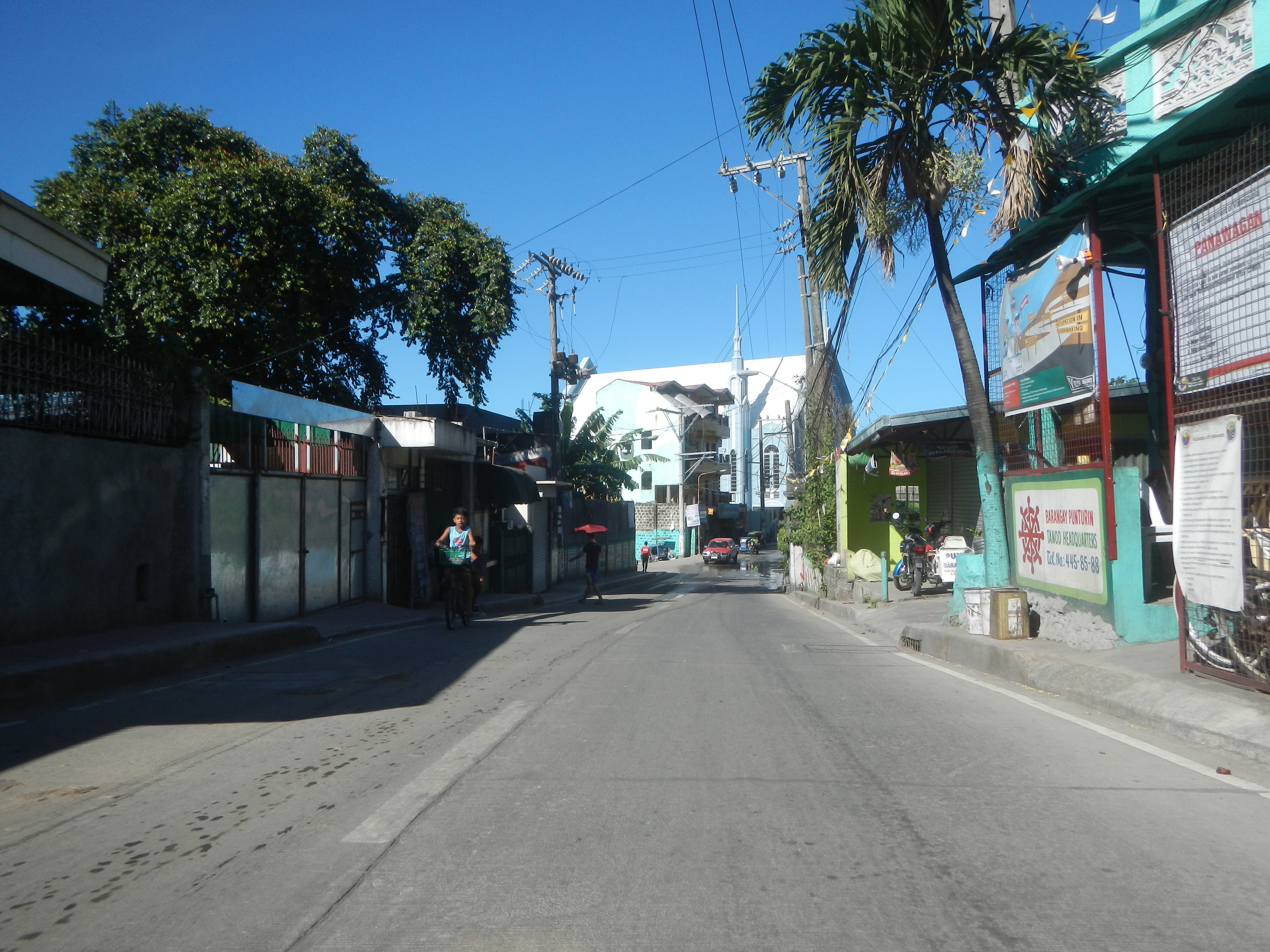
- Faustino Street

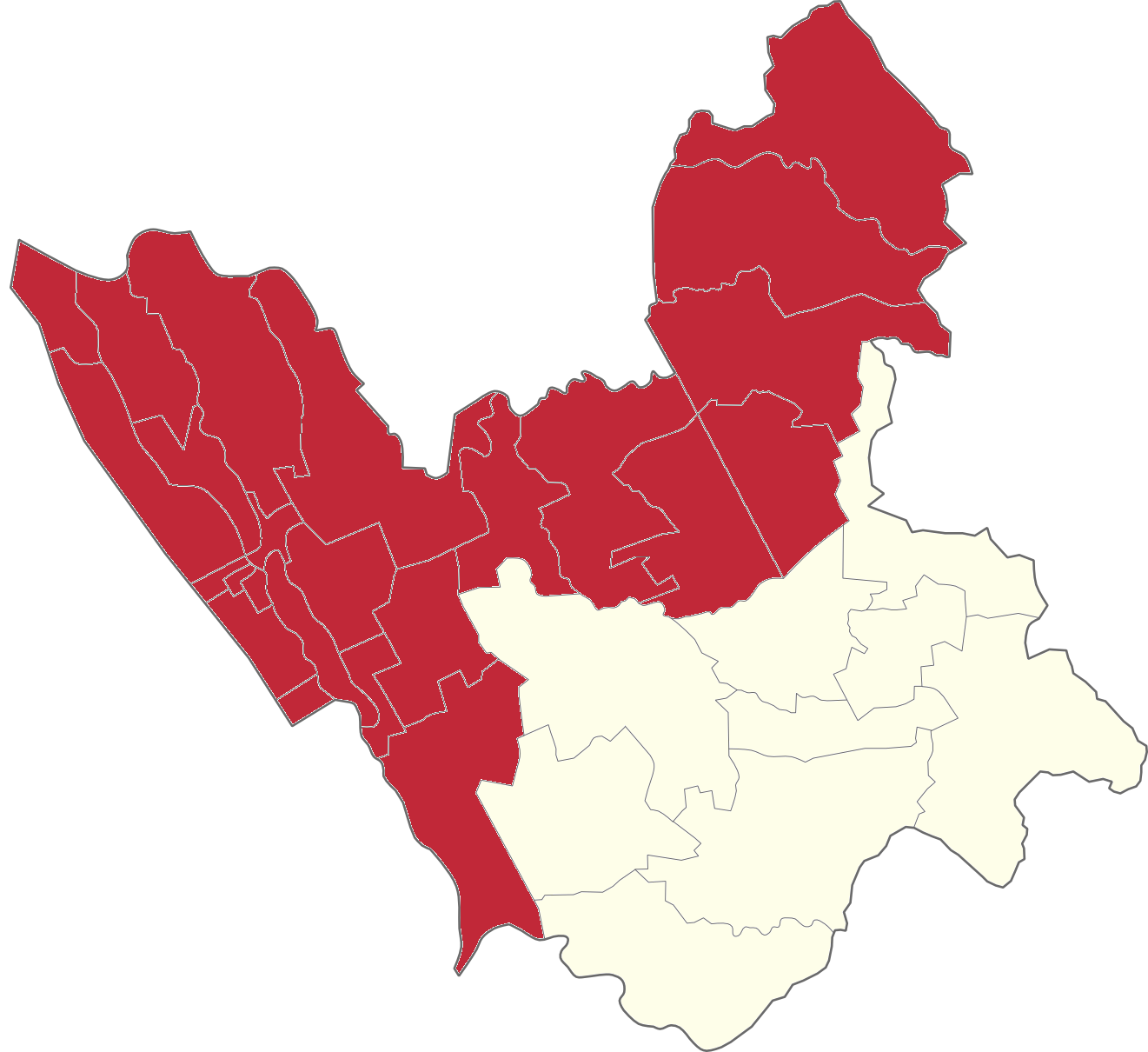
- Location of Punturin in the 1st legislative district of Valenzuela
- Coordinates: 14°44′17″N 120°59′52″E
- Country: Philippines
- Region: National Capital Region
- City: Valenzuela
- Congressional districts: Part of the 1st district of Valenzuela

Government
  - Barangay chairman: Angelito Ramirez Mariano

Area
  - Total: 1.622 km^{2} (0.626 sq mi)

Population (2015)
  - Total: 20,930
  - Density: 12,900/km^{2} (33,420/sq mi)

Punturin is one of the 33 barangays that comprises the City of Valenzuela, Philippines. It is a mix of industrial and residential areas like its neighboring barangays of Bignay and Lawang Bato.

== History ==
In the early times, Punturin was a pure, virgin forest with hills surrounding its vast landscape. Creeks enclosed some of the areas which are directly connected to the Meycauayan River.

The name of the place originated from the word “Maraming Puntod” which means an abundance of hills because of its enveloping terrain.

With the onset of civilization, the people decide to clear the wilderness for more agricultural lands to till. Wood materials gathered from the forest were used in setting up their homes. Fishing was also a primary means of livelihood because of the abundant aquatic resources from the river.

Punturin was used to be a part of Barrio Lawang Bato but as the number of residents increased, it was decided by the old inhabitants to separate the northern part of the area. The barangay was officially established on April 4, 1945 under Mayor Avelino Deato.

Today, Punturin is well known for its industrial areas and its fast-growing population due to different residential areas established within the barangay.

They celebrate fiesta every first day of May, the feast of St. Joseph the Worker. Famous delicacies include kuchinta, bibingka, puto or sweet rice desserts. An estimated 20,930 residents live in Punturin in this 162.20 square hectare barangay.

== Education ==
Elementary and high school education is accessible for the residents of Punturin. It has two public elementary school and one public high school under the Division of City Schools of Valenzuela. Vicente P. Trinidad National High School, named after the former Brgy. Capt. Vicente Trinidad, is a public high school that serves not only the residents of Punturin, but also its neighboring barangays. Senior high school education is also offered in VPTNHS, but the first senior high school institution in Punturin was in St. Gregory College of Valenzuela. Punturin had also numerous day care centers managed by the City Social Welfare and Development Office.

=== Public schools ===
- Vicente P. Trinidad National High School
- Punturin Elementary School
- Punturin 1 Elementary School
- Punturin Senior High School

=== Private schools ===
- St. Gregory College of Valenzuela
- Our Lord's Vineyard School
- St. Benedict Academy of Valenzuela
- Grace Pearl School of Valenzuela
- St. Joseph School of Lawang Bato,

== Residential areas ==
- Sta. Lucia Village Phases III, IV, V, and VI
- Green Meadows
- Natividad Homes
- Northville 1B

== Religion ==
Majority of the residents of the barangay are Roman Catholics. The patron saint of Punturin is St. Joseph the Worker with its feast day celebrated every May 1. Other religions that established churches within Punturin are Iglesia ni Cristo and Members Church of God International among others.

== Famous landmarks ==
=== Government ===
- 3S Center Punturin (Barangay Hall of Punturin)
  - Fire station
  - Police station
  - Playground
  - Various social services
- Vicente P. Trinidad National High School
- Punturin Senior High School
- Punturin Elementary School
- Punturin 1 Elementary School

=== Places of worship ===
- St. Joseph Parish Church
- Iglesia Ni Cristo (Lokal ng Punturin)
- Ang Dating Daan

=== Transport terminals ===
- CALAPUPA TODA Terminal (Canumay East, Lawang Bato, Punturin, Paso de Blas)
- BP TODA Terminal (Bignay, Punturin)
- Meycauayan-Punturin Jeepney Terminal
