= St. Gregory College of Valenzuela =

- 162 P. Faustino St., Punturin, Valenzuela City, Philippines

Information
- Type: Private school
- Patron saint: St. Gregory the Great
- Established: 2007
- Grades: K - Grade 12
- Classes: 25 (SY 2017-2018)
- Language: Filipino and English
- Schedule: 6:00AM-7:00PM (UTC+8)
- Colours: Yellow, orange, and blue
- Team name: Gregorian Warriors
- Affiliations: Division of City Schools–Valenzuela, VALAPSA

St. Gregory College of Valenzuela (formerly St. Gregory School of Valenzuela) is a private school in Valenzuela City established in 2007. It is located at #162 P. Faustino St., Punturin, Valenzuela City, Philippines. It cater to students from kindergarten through senior high school.

== See also ==
- Punturin, Valenzuela
