= List of barangays of Metro Manila =

Metro Manila is divided into seventeen primary local government units (LGU) that consist of sixteen cities and one municipality. Each city and municipality is governed by an elected mayor and is divided into several villages or barangays (formerly called barrios) headed by an elected barangay captain. Barangay populations range in size from under 1,000 to over 200,000. As of the 2015 census, the total population of Metro Manila was 12,877,253.

Among all local government units in Metro Manila, only the cities of Manila, Caloocan and Pasay implement the Zone Systems. A zone is a group of barangays in a district. Although a zone is considered a subdivision in the local government units, the people do not elect a chairman for the zone in a popular election similar to the normal barangay or local elections. The zoning system is merely for strategical purposes. Additionally, these three cities use a hybrid system for its barangays - all barangays have their corresponding numbers but only a few have corresponding names. For example, the name of a barangay in the City of Manila would read as "Barangay 288 Zone 27".

As of 2015, there are 1,710 barangays in Metro Manila. These original four cities of Metro Manila (Manila, Quezon City, Caloocan, Pasay) comprise 83% (1,428 of 1,710) of all these. The high number is attributed to these areas having more people and higher density when the barangay system was initiated (note that Caloocan North is sparsely populated then and consequently was given a lower number of barangays). The other cities merely converted old barrios to barangays. In 1975, Manila had 1,479,116 people (897 barangays), Quezon City with 956,864 (142 barangays), Caloocan with 397,201 (188 barangays) and Pasay with 254,999 (201 barangays).

Due to population growth especially in the suburbs of Manila, the number of barangays now seem disproportionate. More than half of barangays in Metro Manila are found in the City of Manila (2015 pop.: 1,780,148) with 897 barangays. Caloocan (pop.: 1,583,978) has 188 barangays and Pasay (pop.: 416,522) has 210 barangays. In comparison, Quezon City (2015 pop.: 2,936,116) – the largest city both in terms of land area and population – only has 142 barangays. The number of barangays in other local government units in Metro Manila range from 9 in Muntinlupa to 38 in Taguig.

In 1989, Republic Act 6714 called for a plebiscite reducing the seventy barangays constituting the first congressional district of Caloocan to only thirty barangays.

Manila has also attempted to bring down the number of barangays from 897 to 150 in 1996 through Ordinance 7907 but failed to hold a plebiscite.

This list covers all barangays sorted alphabetically with the exception of Manila, Caloocan and Pasay. Instead, district names are listed for these cities.

== Number of barangays per LGU ==
Local government units of Metro Manila

City/Municipality	Population as of 2024	Number of barangays
Manila	1,902,590	897
Caloocan	1,712,945	188
Las Piñas	615,549	20
Makati	309,770	23
Malabon	389,929	21
Mandaluyong	465,902	27
Marikina	471,323	16
Muntinlupa	552,225	9
Navotas	252,878	18
Parañaque	703,245	16
Pasay	453,186	201
Pasig	853,050	30
Pateros	67,319	10
Quezon City	3,084,270	142
San Juan	134,312	21
Taguig	1,308,085	38
Valenzuela	725,173	33

== List of barangays ==
In the absence of a verified ZIP code, the ZIP code of the city's central post office is provided instead.

=== A ===
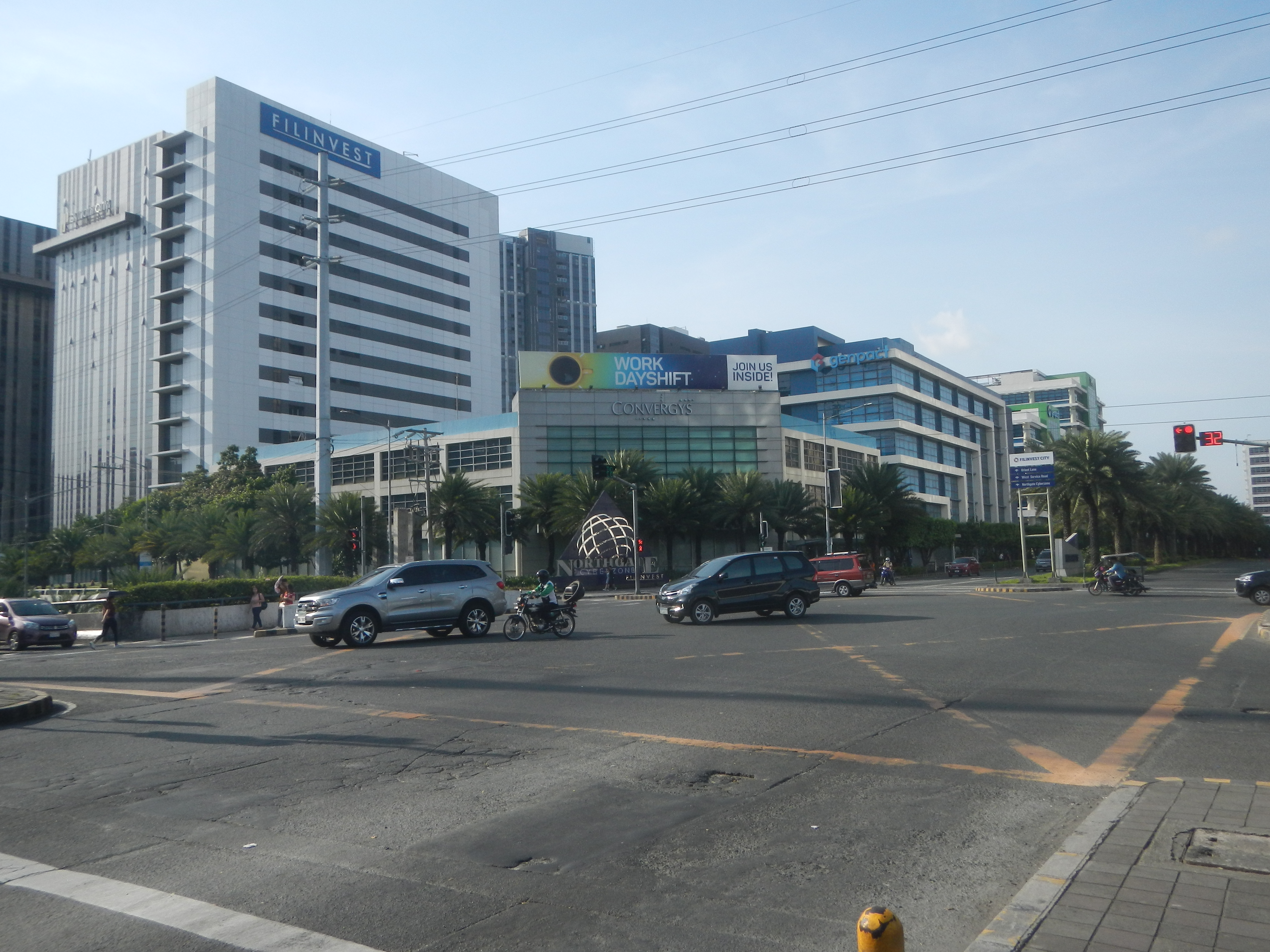
Office towers at Filinvest City's Northgate Cyberzone in Alabang

Name	Population (2020)	ZIP Code	City/Municipality
Acacia	4,959	1474	Malabon
Addition Hills	108,896	1552	Mandaluyong
Addition Hills	3,818	1550 (Note: Mandaluyong Central Post Office)	San Juan
Aguho	7,322	1620	Pateros
Alabang	71,075	1777	Muntinlupa
Alicia	6,119	1105	Quezon City
Almanza Uno	36,232	1748	Las Piñas
Almanza Dos	37,432	1750 / 1751	Las Piñas
Amihan	3,513	1102	Quezon City
Amparo		1425	Caloocan
Apolonio Samson	33,269	1106	Quezon City
Arkong Bato	11,358	1444	Valenzuela
Aurora	4,221	1113	Quezon City
Ayala Alabang (New Alabang)	25,115	1799 / 1780	Muntinlupa

=== B ===
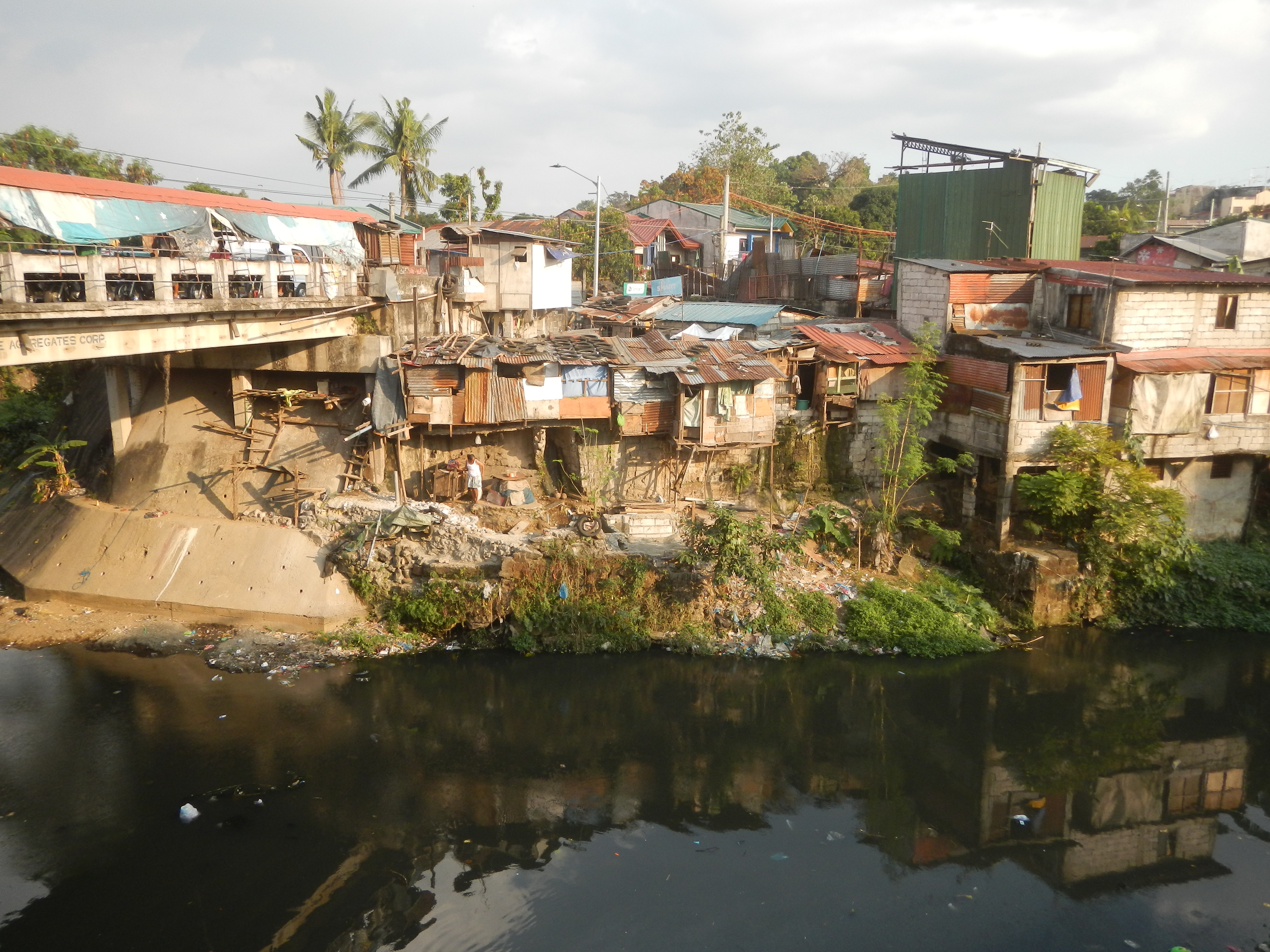
Riverside shacks in Barangay 176 (Bagong Silang), the most populous barangay in Metro Manila with a population of 245,615 (2015 Census)

Name	Population (2020)	ZIP Code	City/Municipality
Baclaran	28,385	1702	Parañaque
Baesa		1401	Caloocan
Baesa	61,278	1106	Quezon City
Bagbag	56,936	1116	Quezon City
Bagbaguin	13,770	1440 (Note: Valenzuela Central Post Office)	Valenzuela
Bagong Barrio		1400	Caloocan
Bagong Ilog	16,797	1600 (Note: Pasig Central Post Office)	Pasig
Bagong Katipunan	1,231	1600	Pasig
Bagong Lipunan ng Crame	14,996	1111	Quezon City
Bagong Pag-asa	32,267	1105	Quezon City
Bagong Silang		1428	Caloocan
Bagong Silang	5,572	1550	Mandaluyong
Bagong Silangan	88,299	1119	Quezon City
Bagumbayan	13,832	1110	Quezon City
Bagumbayan	40,685	1630	Taguig
Bagumbayan North	2,579	1409	Navotas
Bagumbayan South	5,051	1409	Navotas
Bagumbong		1421	Caloocan
Bagumbuhay	6,767	1109	Quezon City
Bahay Toro	70,774	1106	Quezon City
Balangkas-Caloong	11,892	1445	Valenzuela
Balingasa	20,609	1115	Quezon City
Balintawak		1106	Quezon City
Balong Bato	8,228	1106	Quezon City
Balong-bato	7,775	1500 (Note: San Juan Central Post Office)	San Juan
Bambang	20,657	1600	Pasig
Bambang	10,010	1637	Taguig
Bangkal	21,650	1233	Makati
Bangkulasi	7,954	1411	Navotas
Barangka	18,504	1803	Marikina
Barangka Drive	13,310	1550	Mandaluyong
Barangka Ibaba	9,540	1553	Mandaluyong
Barangka Ilaya	17,896	1554	Mandaluyong
Barangka Itaas	11,252	1550	Mandaluyong
Baritan	10,193	1470 (Note: Malabon Post Office)	Malabon
Barrio San Jose		1404	Caloocan
Batasan Hills	161,409	1126	Quezon City
Batis	9,774	1500	San Juan
Bayanan	36,673	1772	Muntinlupa
Bayanihan	1,222	1109	Quezon City
Bayan-bayanan	6,702	1470	Malabon
Bel-Air	23,685	1209 / 1227	Makati
BF Homes Caloocan		1422	Caloocan
BF Homes	88,035	1718 / 1720	Parañaque
BF International Village-CAA	77,264	1740 (Note: Las Piñas Central Post Office)	Las Piñas
Biglang-Awa		1400 (Note: Caloocan Central Post Office)	Caloocan
Bignay	27,059	1440	Valenzuela
Binondo (District)	18,040	1006	City of Manila
Bisig	1,333	1445	Valenzuela
Blue Ridge A	1,730	1109	Quezon City
Blue Ridge B	1,701	1109	Quezon City
Botocan	8,234	1101	Quezon City
Buayang Bato	1,782	1554	Mandaluyong
Buli	9,292	1771	Muntinlupa
Bungad	8,057	1105	Quezon City
Burol	2,740	1550	Mandaluyong
Buting	11,093	1600	Pasig

=== C ===
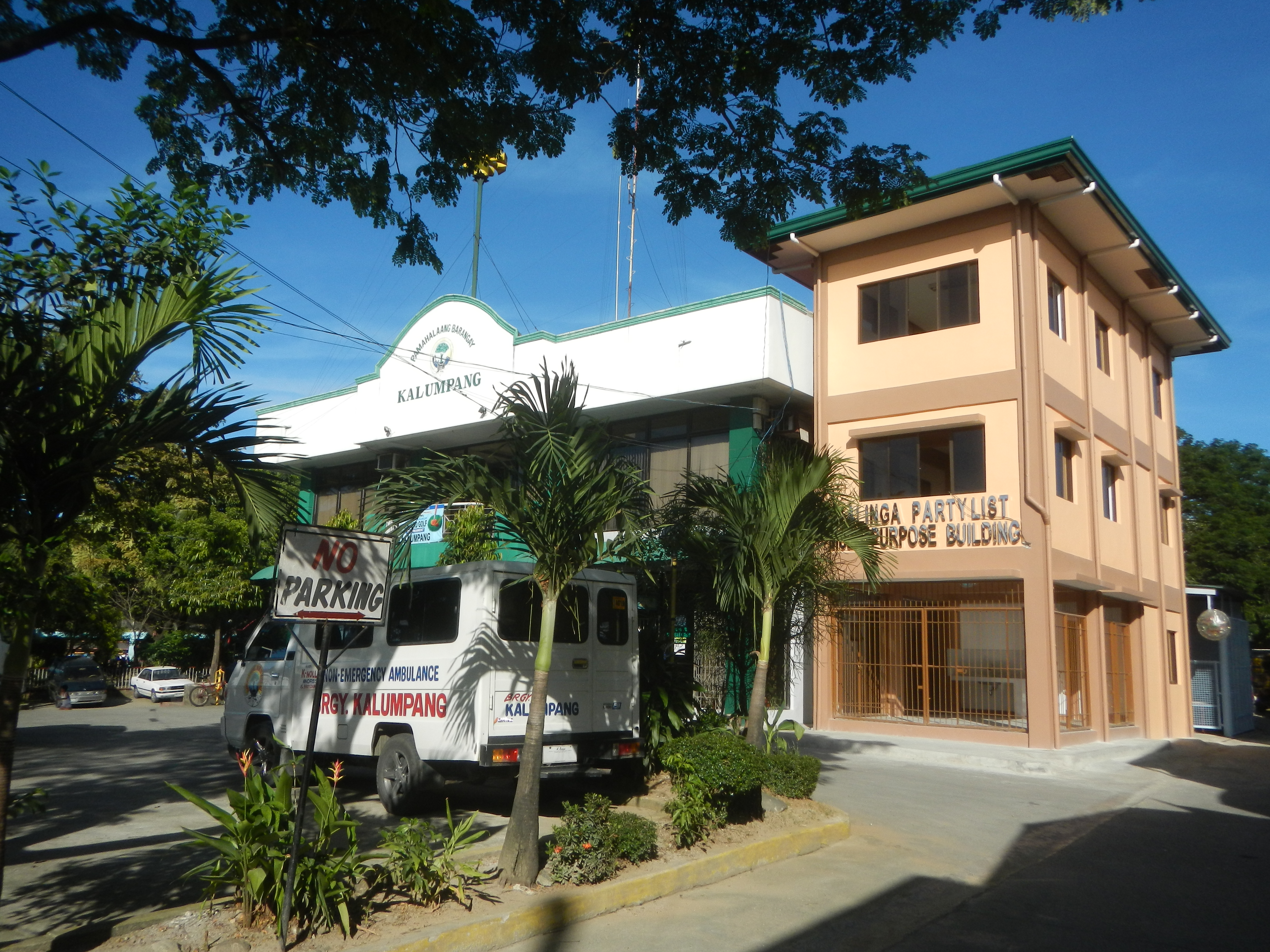
Barangay hall of Calumpang

Name	Population (2015)	ZIP Code	City/Municipality
Caloocan (Pob.)		1400	Caloocan
Calumpang	14,857	1801	Marikina
Calzada	21,747	1630	Taguig
Camarin		1422	Caloocan
Camarin-Central		1422	Caloocan
Camarin-Cielito		1422	Caloocan
Camarin-Kiko		1422	Caloocan
Camp Aguinaldo	4,977	1110	Quezon City
Caniogan	27,574	1606	Pasig
Canumay East	12,462	1447	Valenzuela
Canumay West	22,215	1443	Valenzuela
Capri	14,587	1117	Quezon City
Carmona	3,109	1207	Makati
Catmon	39,466	1470	Malabon
Caybiga		1420	Caloocan
Cembo	25,049	1640	Taguig
Central	17,590	1100 (Note: Quezon City Central Post Office)	Quezon City
Central Bicutan	28,705	1631	Taguig
Central Signal Village	39,674	1636	Taguig
Claro	4,432	1102	Quezon City
Coloong	11,154	1445	Valenzuela
Comembo	15,805	1641	Taguig
Commonwealth	198,285	1121	Quezon City
Concepcion	13,311	1470	Malabon
Concepcion Uno	42,564	1807	Marikina
Concepcion Dos	25,637	1811	Marikina
Congress Village		1400	Caloocan
Corazon de Jesus	7,928	1500	San Juan
Culiat	74,304	1128	Quezon City
Cupang	58,331	1771	Muntinlupa

=== D ===
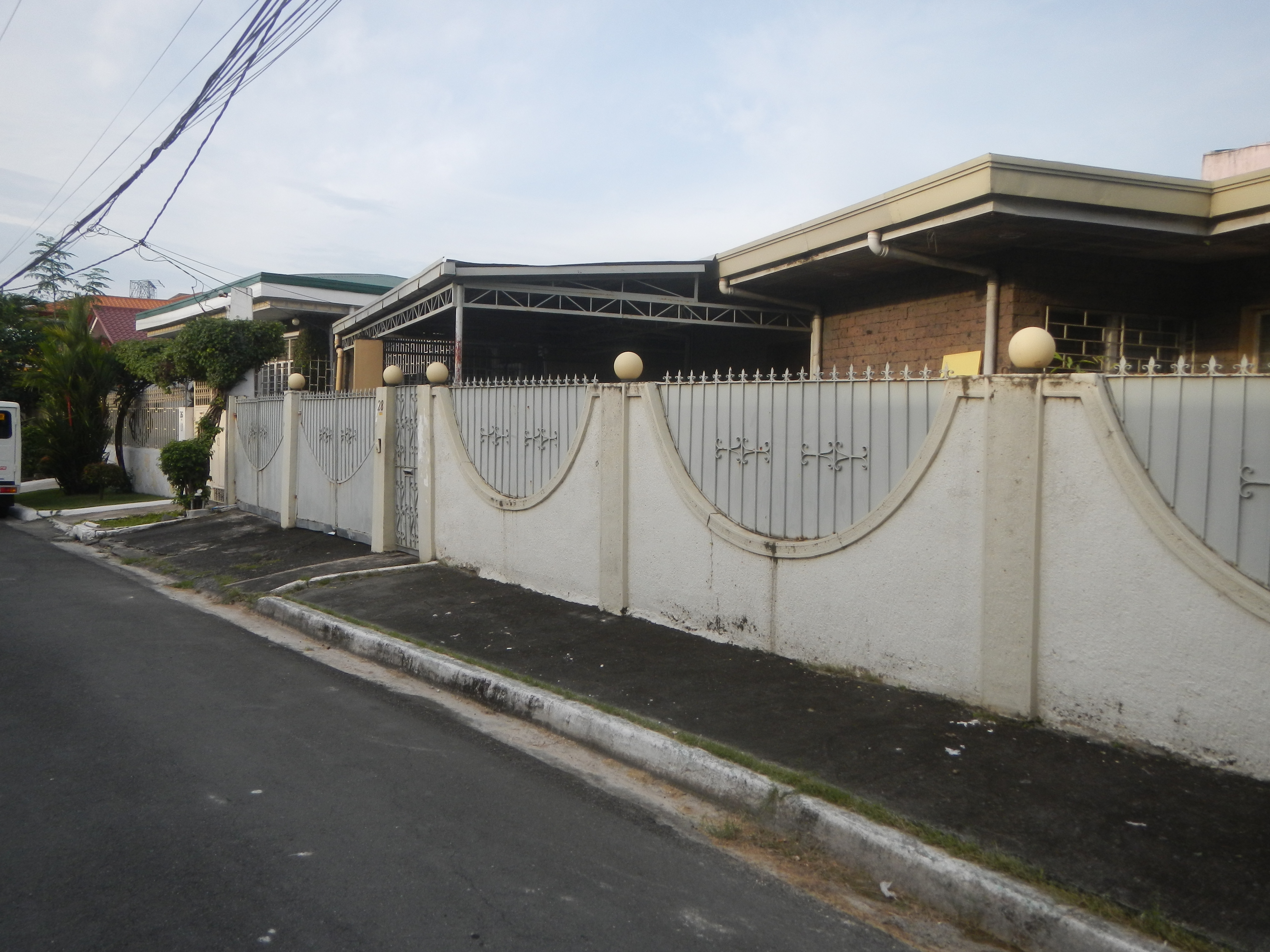
Bungalows in Don Bosco

Name	Population (2015)	ZIP Code	City/Municipality
Daang Bakal	3,660	1550	Mandaluyong
Daanghari	16,894	1409	Navotas
Dagat-Dagatan		1400	Caloocan
Dalandanan	18,733	1443	Valenzuela
Damar	1,646	1115	Quezon City
Damayan	8,716	1104	Quezon City
Damayang Lagi	18,599	1112	Quezon City
Dampalit	12,124	1480	Malabon
Daniel Fajardo	10,425	1740	Las Piñas
Dasmariñas	5,589	1221 / 1222	Makati
Del Monte	12,185	1105	Quezon City
Dela Paz	20,156	1612	Pasig
Deparo		1420	Caloocan
Deparo II		1420	Caloocan
Dioquino Zobel	1,887	1109	Quezon City
District 1		1300 (Note: Pasay City Central Post Office)	Pasay
District 2		1300	Pasay
Don Bosco	52,297	1711 / 1714	Parañaque
Don Galo	11,645	1700	Parañaque
Don Manuel	3,753	1113	Quezon City
Doña Aurora	4,221	1113	Quezon City
Doña Imelda	16,915	1113	Quezon City
Doña Josefa	2,909	1113	Quezon City
Duyan Duyan	3,870	1102	Quezon City

=== E ===
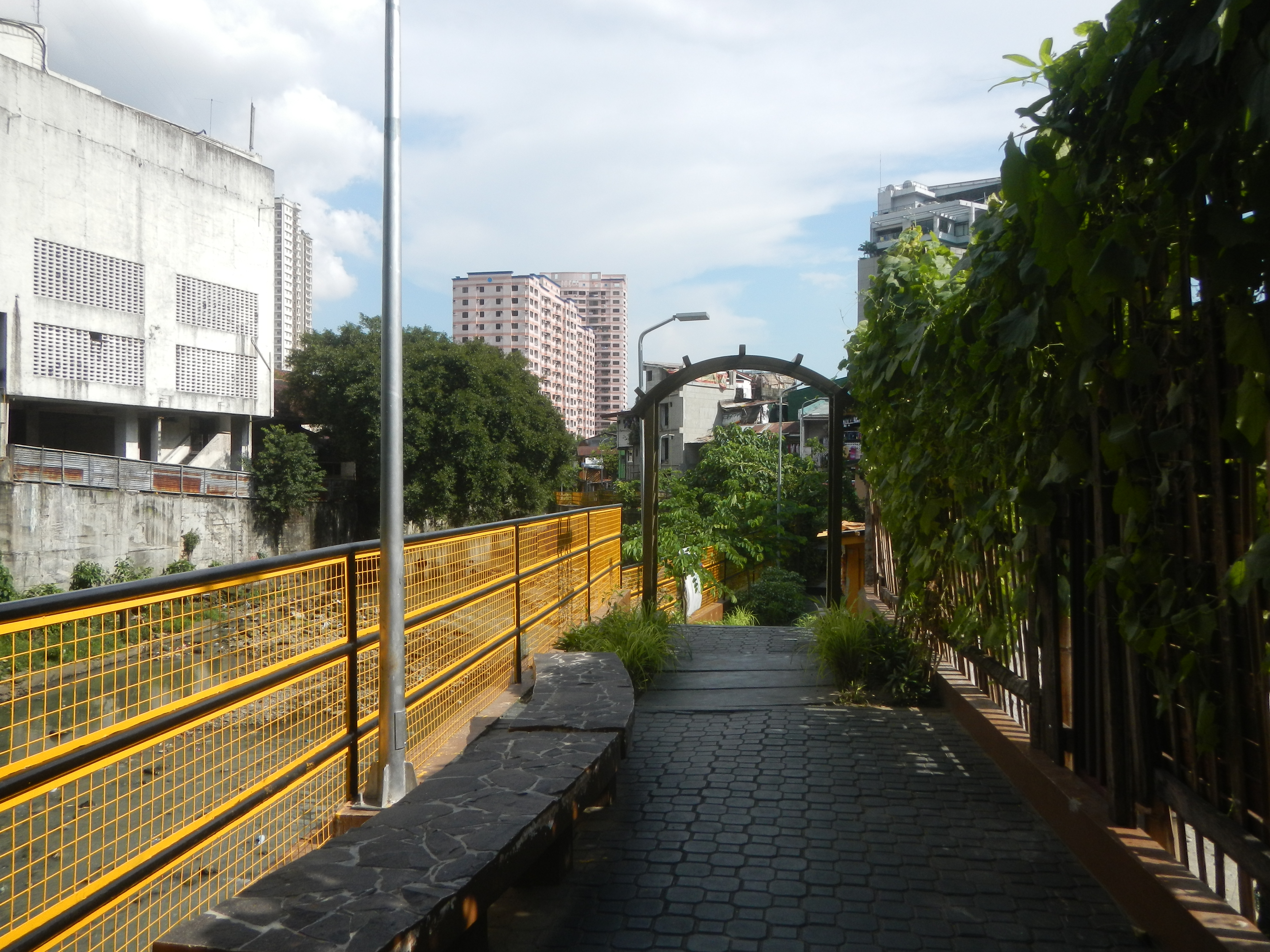
A linear park replaced a creekside slum in Ermitaño

Name	Population (2015)	ZIP Code	City/Municipality
East Kamias	6,206	1102	Quezon City
East Rembo	26,450	1643	Taguig
Elias Aldana	10,402	1740	Las Piñas
Ermita (District)	10,523	1000	City of Manila
Ermitaño	3,381	1500	San Juan
Escopa I	2,221	1109	Quezon City
Escopa II	1,766	1109	Quezon City
Escopa III	8,554	1109	Quezon City
Escopa IV	1,919	1109	Quezon City
E. Rodriguez	19,594	1102	Quezon City

=== F ===
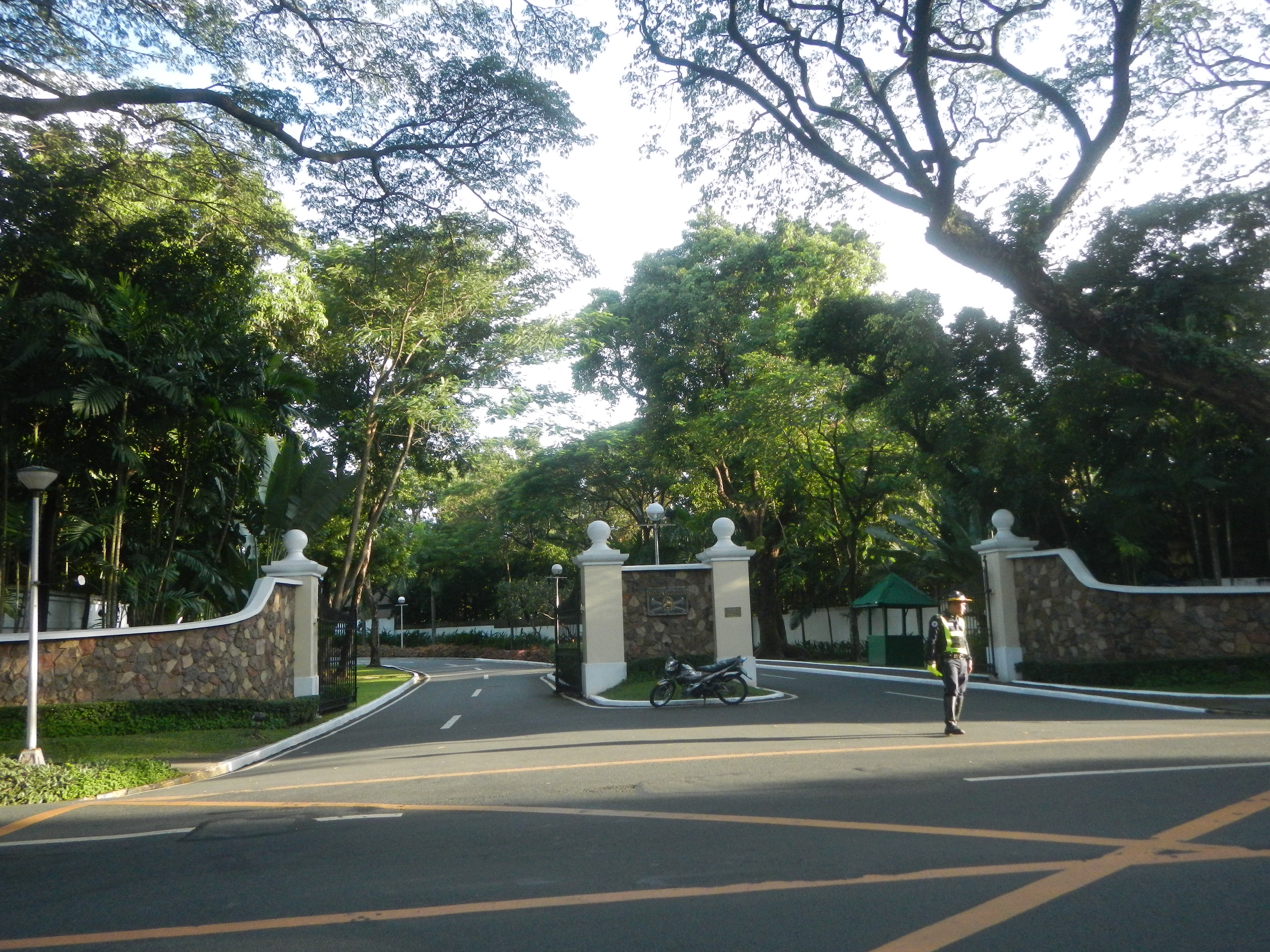
The polo club entrance gate in Forbes Park, the Beverly Hills of Manila

Name	Population (2015)	ZIP Code	City/Municipality
Fairview	53,151	1118 /1122	Quezon City
Flores	4,060	1471	Malabon
Forbes Park	2,335	1219 / 1220	Makati
Fort Bonifacio	11,739	1634	Taguig
Fortune	36,142		Marikina

=== G ===
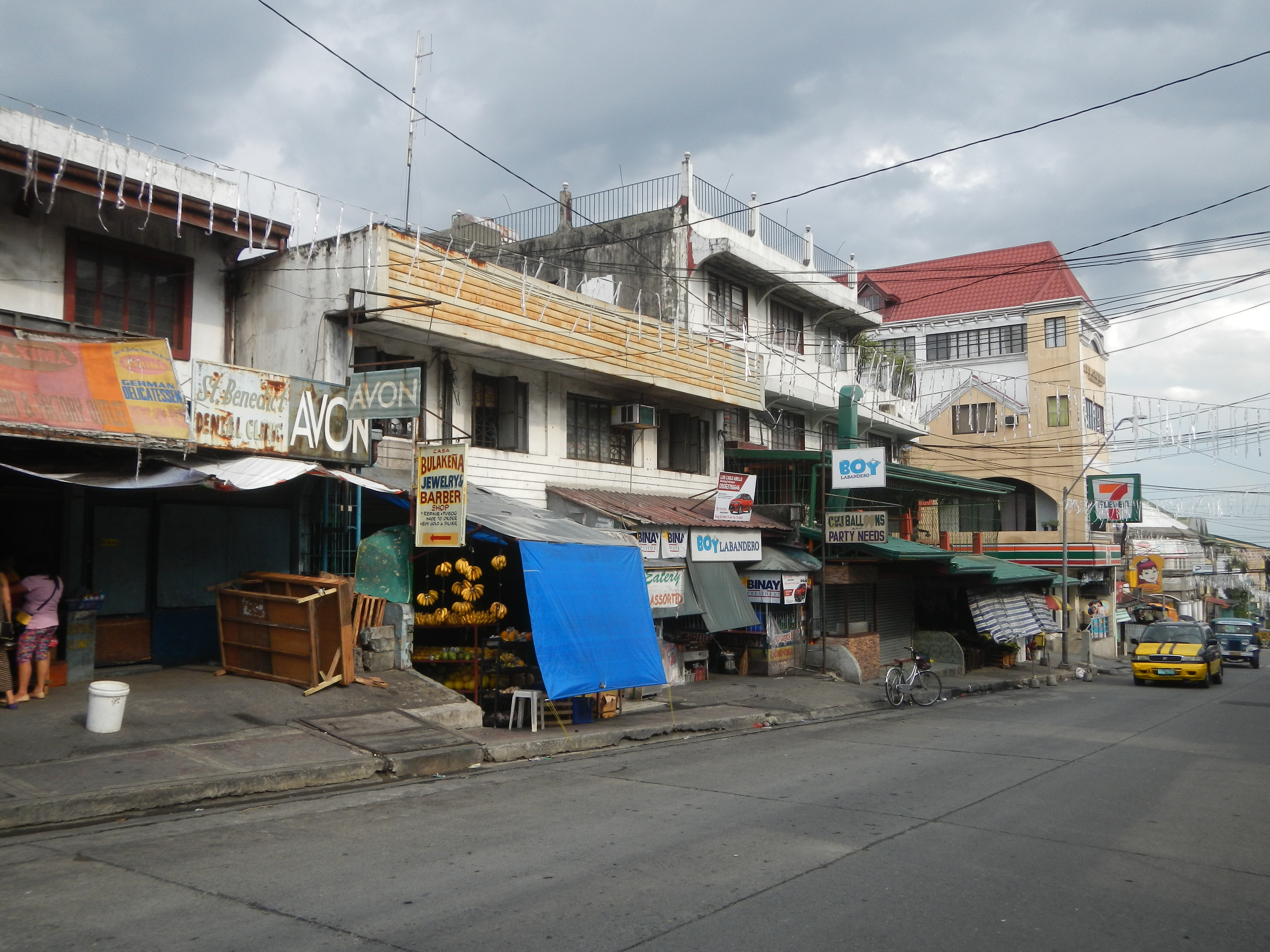
Commercial/residential buildings in Greater Lagro

Name	Population (2015)	ZIP Code	City/Municipality
General T. de Leon	89,441	1442	Valenzuela
Grace Park East		1400	Caloocan
Grace Park West		1406	Caloocan
Greater Lagro	22,764	1100	Quezon City
Greenhills	14,114	1502 / 1503	San Juan
Guadalupe Nuevo	18,341	1212	Makati
Guadalupe Viejo	13,415	1211	Makati
Gulod	53,325	1117	Quezon City

=== H ===
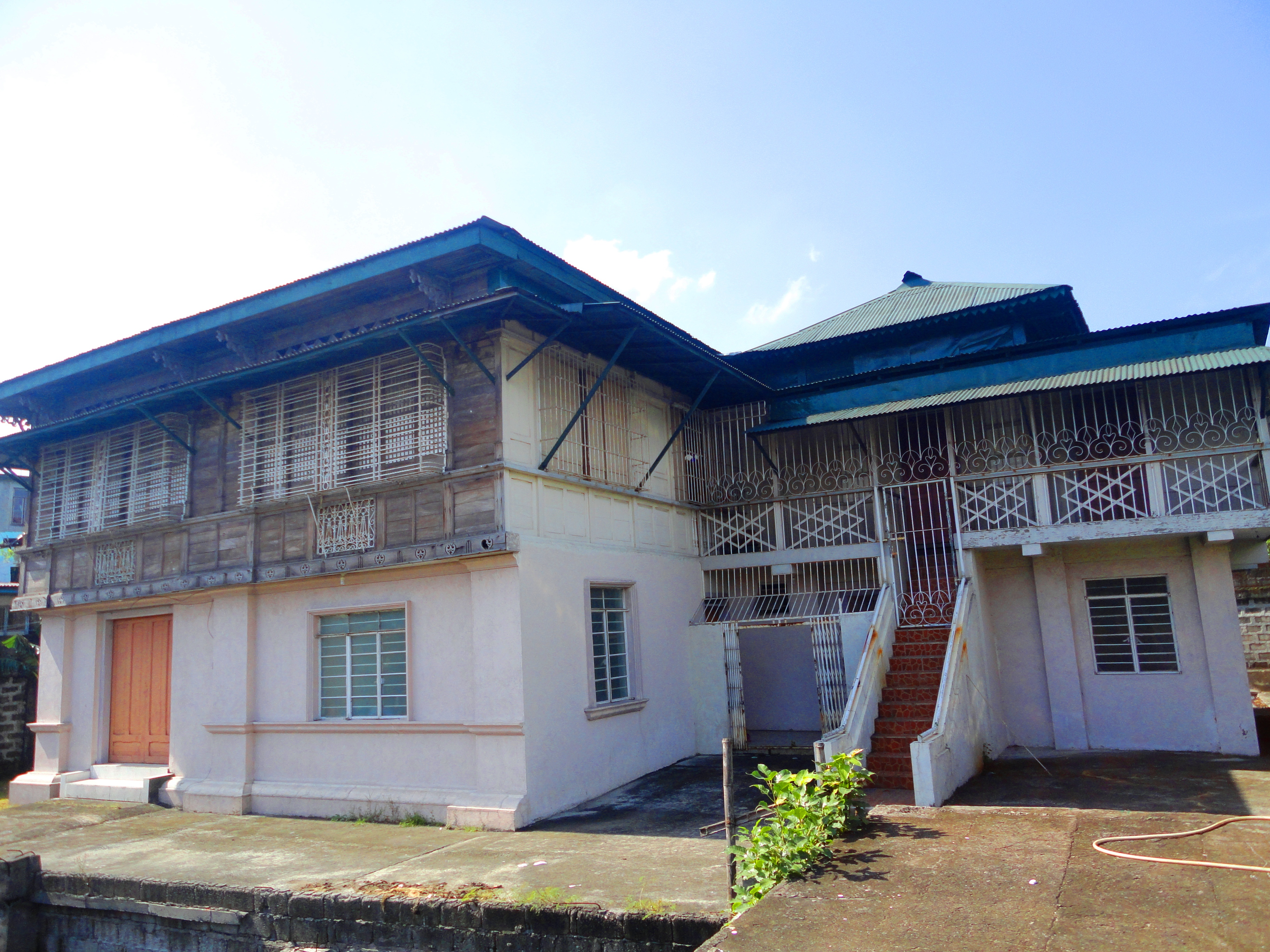
Ancestral house in Hulong Duhat

Name	Population (2015)	ZIP Code	City/Municipality
Hagdang Bato Itaas	10,314	1550	Mandaluyong
Hagdang Bato Libis	6,962	1550	Mandaluyong
Hagonoy	18,652	1636	Taguig
Harapin ang Bukas	4,496	1550	Mandaluyong
Heroes del 96		1012	Caloocan
Highway Hills	28,703	1552	Mandaluyong
Horseshoe	3,004	1112	Quezon City
Holy Spirit	110,447	1127	Quezon City
Hulo	27,515	1550	Mandaluyong
Hulong Duhat	11,957	1470	Malabon

=== I ===
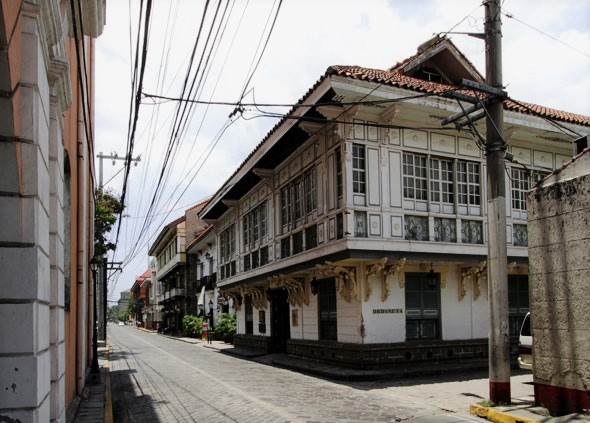
Old stone houses (bahay na bato) in Intramuros district

Name	Population (2015)	ZIP Code	City/Municipality
Ibaba	8,471	1470	Malabon
Ibayo Tipas	20,932	1630	Taguig
Ilaya	6,055	1740	Las Piñas
Immaculate Concepcion	8,670	1111	Quezon City
Industrial Valley	15,995	1802	Marikina
Intramuros (District)	5,935	1002	City of Manila
Isabelita	1,709	1500	San Juan
Isla	4,793	1440	Valenzuela

=== J ===
Name	Population (2015)	ZIP Code	City/Municipality
Jesus de la Peña	10,175	1804	Marikina

=== K ===
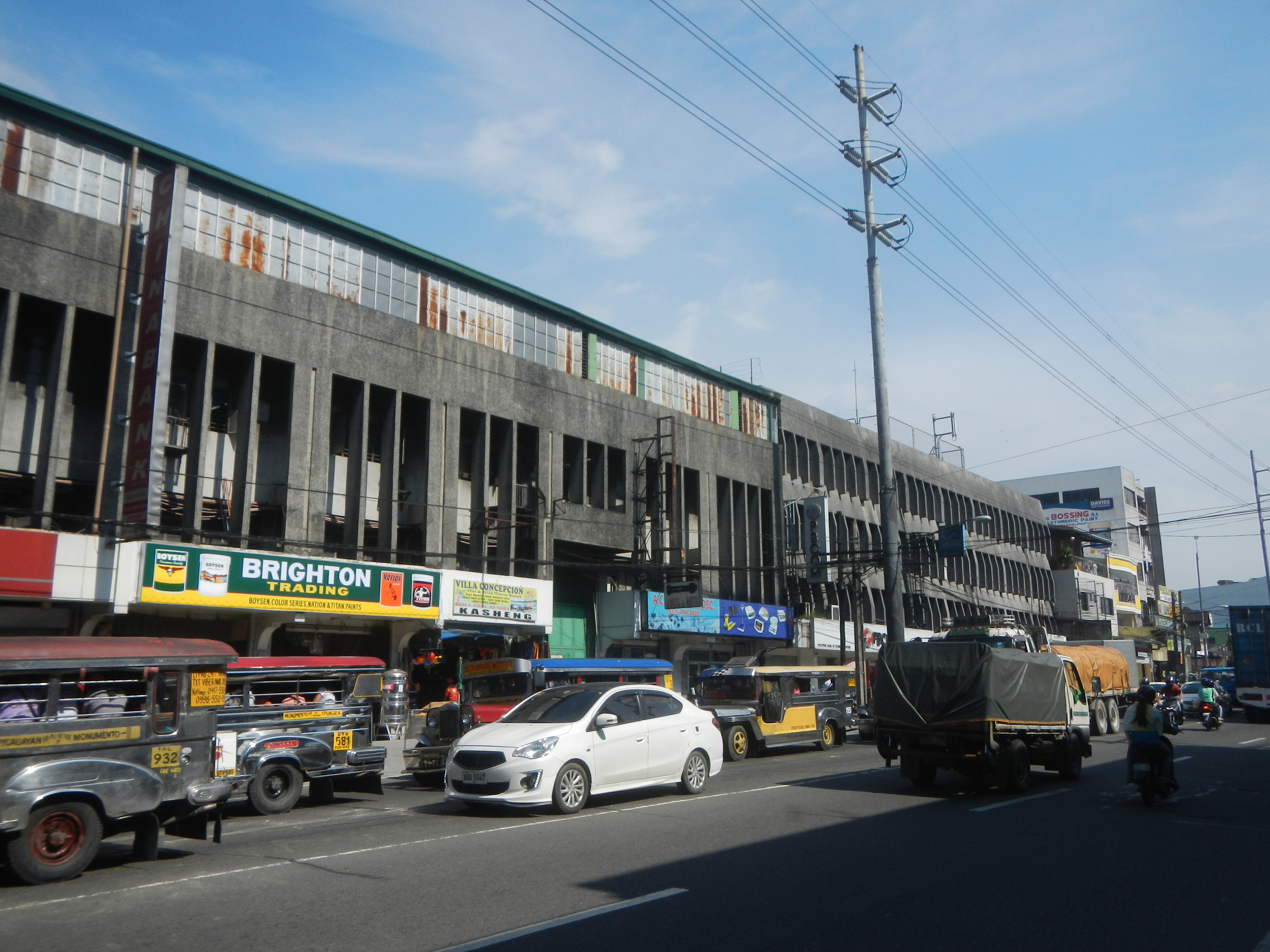
Light industrial buildings in Karuhatan

Name	Population (2015)	ZIP Code	City/Municipality
Kabayanan	5,252	1500	San Juan
Kalawaan	29,892	1600	Pasig
Kaligayahan	54,576	1124	Quezon City
Kalusugan	1,745	1112	Quezon City
Kamuning	15,661	1103	Quezon City
Kapasigan	5,523	1600	Pasig
Kapitolyo	12,974	1603	Pasig
Karuhatan	40,996	1441	Valenzuela
Kasilawan	5,881	1206	Makati
Katipunan	2,818	1105	Quezon City
Katuparan	23,062	1630	Taguig
Kaunlaran	8,167	1111	Quezon City
Kaunlaran Village		1409	Caloocan
Kristong Hari	4,089	1112	Quezon City
Krus na Ligas	21,513	1101	Quezon City

=== L ===
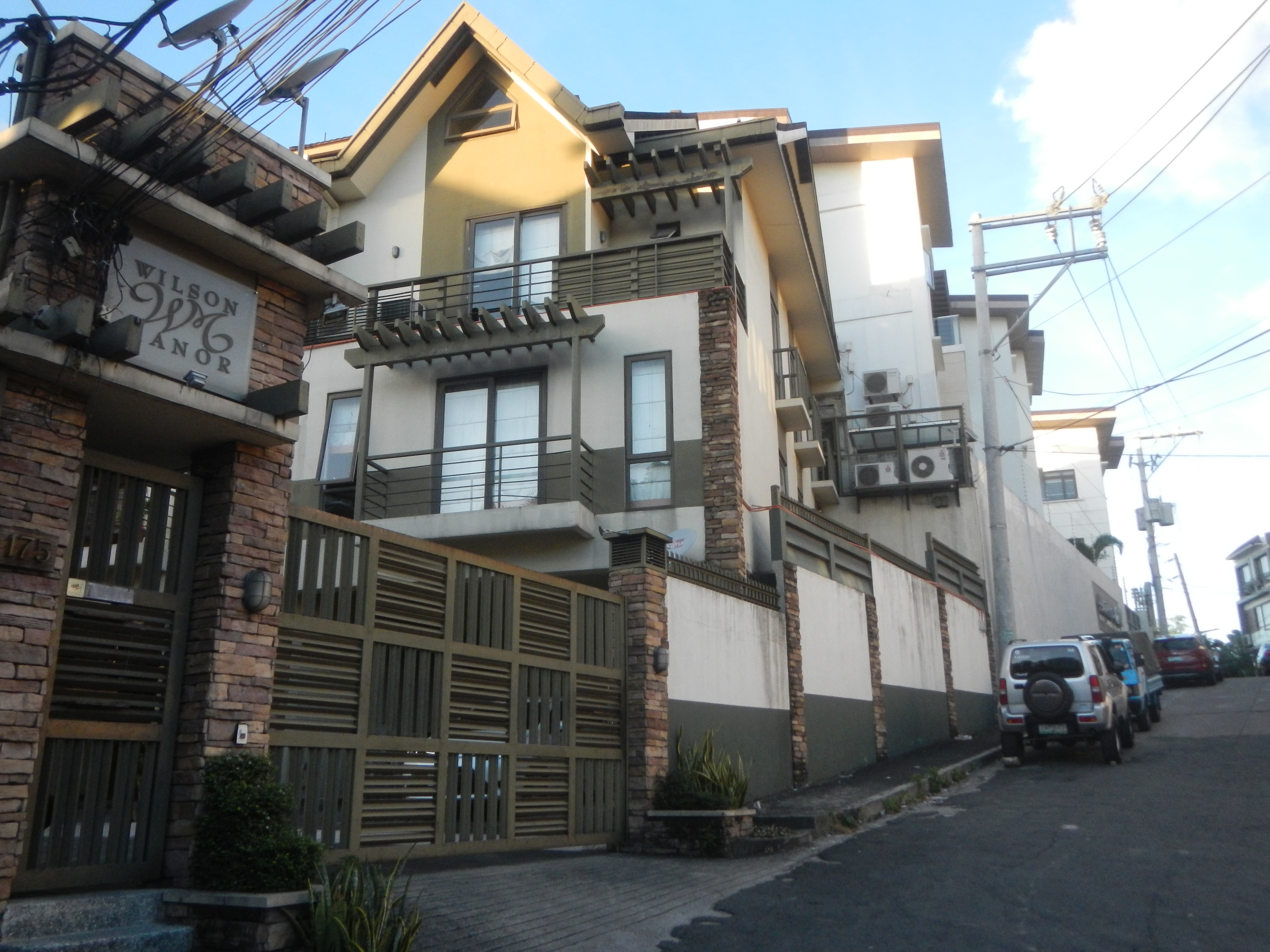
Apartment buildings in Little Baguio

Name	Population (2015)	ZIP Code	City/Municipality
La Huerta	9,569	1700	Parañaque
La Paz	7,356	1204	Makati
Laging Handa	6,750	1103	Quezon City
Lawang Bato	19,301	1447	Valenzuela
Libis	4,018	1110	Quezon City
Libis Baesa		1401	Caloocan
Libis Reparo		1420	Caloocan
Ligid Tipas	9,700	1638	Taguig
Lingunan	21,217	1446	Valenzuela
Little Baguio	6,162	1500	San Juan
Llano		1400	Caloocan
Longos	53,549	1472	Malabon
Lourdes	4,813	1114	Quezon City
Lower Bicutan	56,754	1632	Taguig
Loyola Heights	18,884	1108	Quezon City

=== M ===
Old mansion in Mariana

Name	Population (2015)	ZIP Code	City/Municipality
Mabini-J. Rizal	7,628	1550	Mandaluyong
Mabolo	1,217	1444	Valenzuela
Magallanes	5,672	1232	Makati
Magtanggol		1620	Pateros
Maharlika	4,425	1114	Quezon City
Maharlika Village	22,944	1636	Taguig
Makati (Pob.)	25,393	1210	Makati
Malamig	12,667	1550	Mandaluyong
Malanday	55,442	1805	Marikina
Malanday	17,948	1444	Valenzuela
Malaria		1400	Caloocan
Malate (District)	86,196	1004	City of Manila
Malaya	4,109	1101	Quezon City
Malinao	5,974	1600	Pasig
Malinta	48,397	1440	Valenzuela
Mandaluyong (Pob.)	14,733	1550	Mandaluyong
Mangga	1,158	1109	Quezon City
Manggahan	93,976	1611	Pasig
Manresa	21,413	1115	Quezon City
Manuyo Uno	15,405	1744	Las Piñas
Manuyo Dos	37,007	1745	Las Piñas
Mapulang Lupa	27,354	1448	Valenzuela
Marcelo Green	34,554		Parañaque
Mariana	11,227	1112	Quezon City
Mariblo	4,078	1104	Quezon City
Marikina Heights	38,795	1810	Marikina
Marilag	9,812	1109	Quezon City
Martires		1620	Pateros
Marulas		1400	Caloocan
Marulas	53,978	1440	Valenzuela
Masagana	4,421	1109	Quezon City
Masambong	12,841	1115	Quezon City
Matandang Balara	71,022	1119	Quezon City
Mauway	29,103	1553	Mandaluyong
Maybunga	37,151	1607	Pasig
Maypajo		1410	Caloocan
Maysan	24,293	1440	Valenzuela
Maysilo	11,262	1477	Malabon
Maytunas	3,181	1500	San Juan
Merville	27,508	1709	Parañaque
Milagrosa	6,130	1109	Quezon City
Monumento		1400	Caloocan
Moonwalk	67,723	1708 / 1709	Parañaque
Morning Breeze		1400	Caloocan
Muntinlupa (Pob.)	115,387	1770	Muntinlupa
Muzon	5,668	1479	Malabon

=== N ===
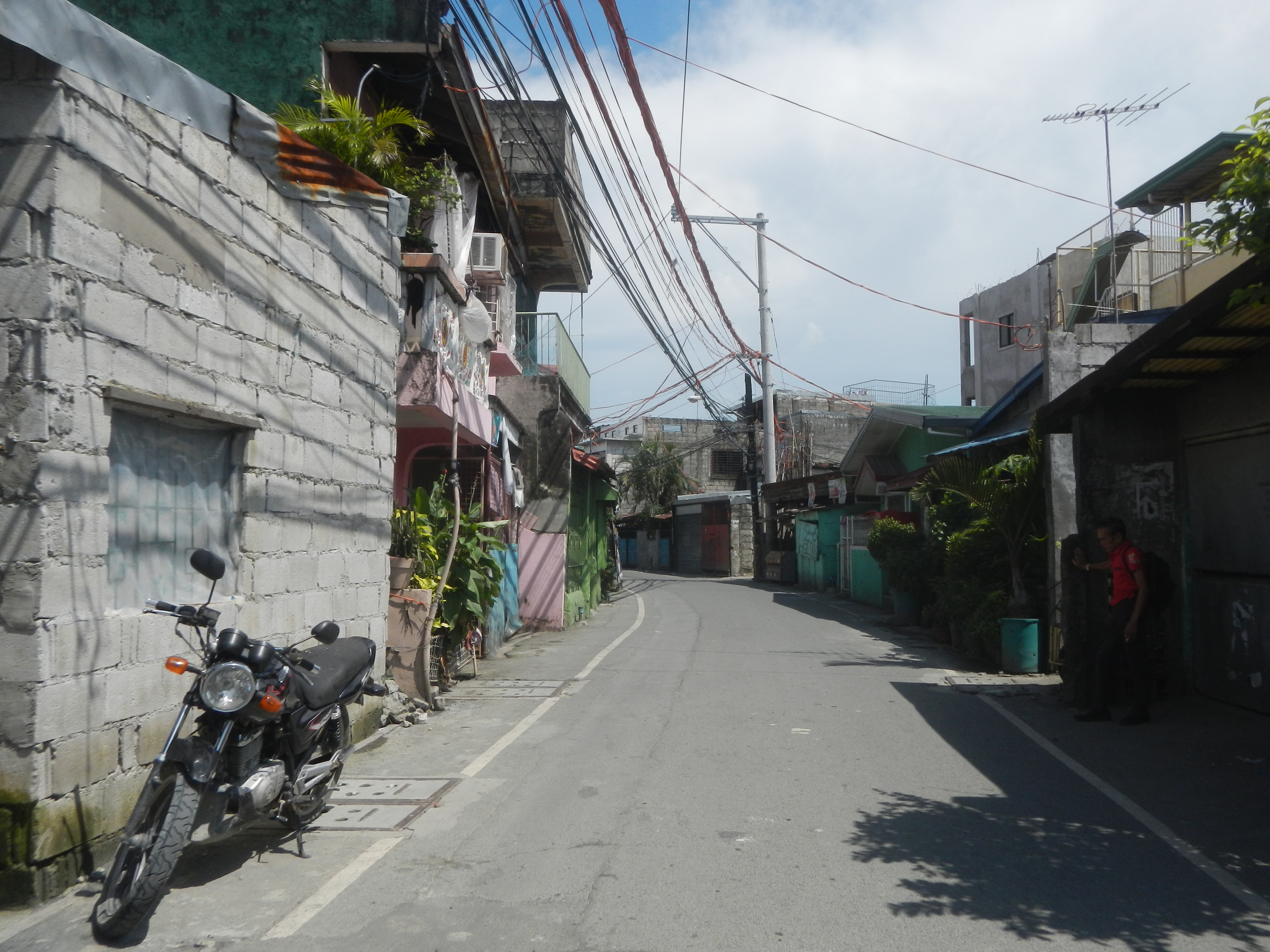
Informal settler houses in Napindan

Name	Population (2015)	ZIP Code	City/Municipality
Nagkaisang Nayon	49,048	1125	Quezon City
Namayan	6,123	1550	Mandaluyong
Nangka	43,828	1808	Marikina
Napindan	19,346	1630	Taguig
Navotas East	2,214	1485	Navotas
Navotas West	6,108	1485	Navotas
Nayong Kanluran	2,428	1104	Quezon City
New Era	13,365	1107	Quezon City
New Lower Bicutan	49,829	1632	Taguig
New Zañiga	7,534	1550	Mandaluyong
Niugan	6,232	1470	Malabon
North Daang Hari	11,771	1637	Taguig
North Fairview	41,154	1121	Quezon City
North Signal Village	32,112	1637	Taguig
Northbay Boulevard North	14,134	1411	Navotas
Northbay Boulevard South (NBBS) Dagat-dagatan		1413	Navotas
Northbay Boulevard South (NBBS) Kaunlaran	70,934	1413	Navotas
Northbay Boulevard South (NBBS) Proper		1413	Navotas
Novaliches Proper	15,381	1121	Quezon City
N.S. Amoranto	6,859	1114	Quezon City

=== O ===
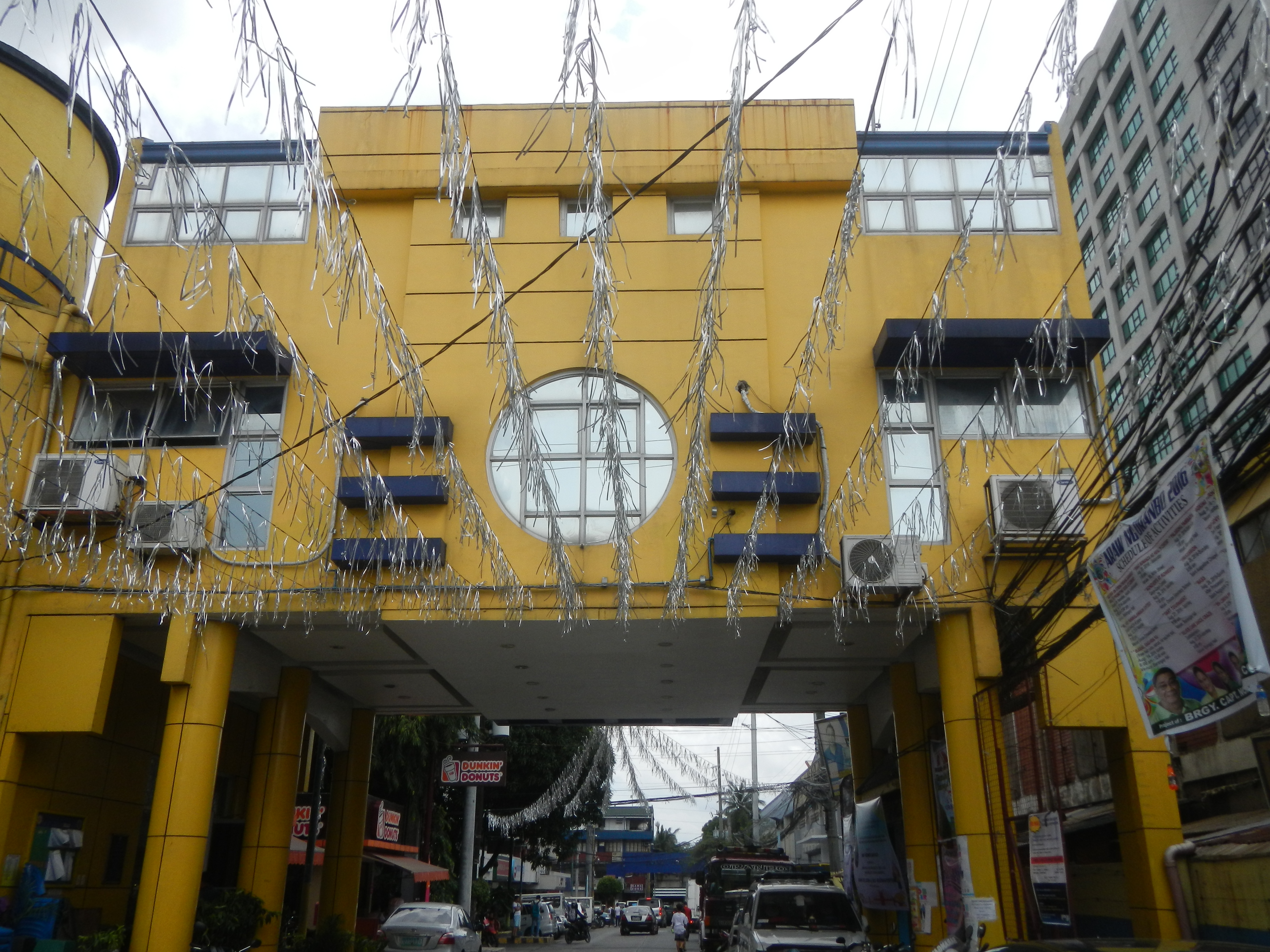
Barangay hall of Oranbo

Name	Population (2015)	ZIP Code	City/Municipality
Obrero	8,269	1103	Quezon City
Old Capitol Site	1,192	1101	Quezon City
Old Zañiga	7,013	1550	Mandaluyong
Olympia	20,251	1207	Makati
Onse	4,065	1500	San Juan
Oranbo	4,320	1600	Pasig

=== P ===
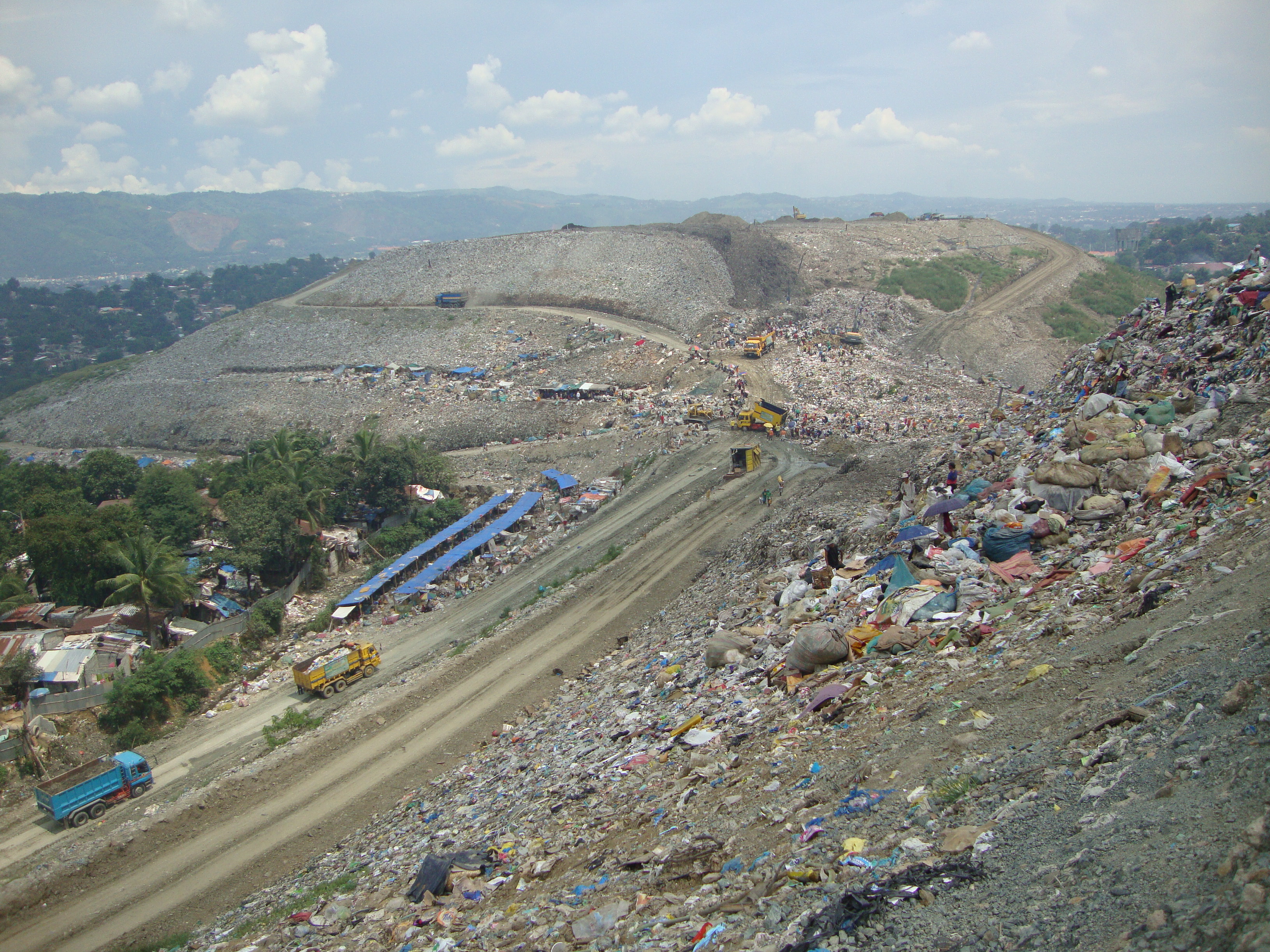
Landfill in Payatas

Name	Population (2015)	ZIP Code	City/Municipality
Paang Bundok	5,643	1114	Quezon City
Paco (District)	82,466	1007	City of Manila
Pag-asa	4,053	1550	Mandaluyong
Pag-ibig sa Nayon	5,441	1115	Quezon City
Palanan	14,110	1235	Makati
Palasan	6,089	1444	Valenzuela
Palatiw	18,356	1600	Pasig
Paligsahan	5,611	1103	Quezon City
Palingon	13,705	1630	Taguig
Paltok	17,342	1105	Quezon City
Pamplona Uno	18,577	1741	Las Piñas
Pamplona Dos	10,765	1741	Las Piñas
Pamplona Tres	35,612	1746	Las Piñas
Pandacan (District)	87,405	1016	City of Manila
Pangarap Village		1400	Caloocan
Panghulo	15,102	1470	Malabon
Pansol	34,240	1108	Quezon City
Parada	14,894	1440	Valenzuela
Paraiso	3,790	1104	Quezon City
Parang	41,661	1809	Marikina
Pariancillo Villa	1,634	1440	Valenzuela
Pasadeña	4,825	1500	San Juan
Paso de Blas	13,350	1442	Valenzuela
Pasolo	6,395	1444	Valenzuela
Pasong Putik	35,135	1118	Quezon City
Pasong Tamo	103,100	1107	Quezon City
Pateros (Pob.)		1620	Pateros
Payatas	130,333	1119	Quezon City
Pedro Cruz	4,427	1500	San Juan
Pembo	44,506	1642	Taguig
Phil-Am	2,673	1104	Quezon City
Pilar Village	31,459	1740	Las Piñas
Pinagbuhatan	151,979	1602	Pasig
Pinagkaisahan	5,739	1213	Makati
Pinagkaisahan	6,929	1111	Quezon City
Pinagsama	57,343	1630	Taguig
Pineda	18,167	1600	Pasig
Pinyahan	27,653	1100	Quezon City
Pio del Pilar	30,732	1230	Makati
Pitogo	14,654	1646	Taguig
Plainview	26,575	1550	Mandaluyong
Pleasant Hills	5,910	1552	Mandaluyong
Polo	1,103	1444	Valenzuela
Port Area (District)	66,742	1018	City of Manila
Post Proper Northside	57,940	1647	Taguig
Post Proper Southside	63,308	1648	Taguig
Potrero	42,768	1475 / 1476	Malabon
Progreso	1,420	1500	san Juan
Project 6	15,255	1100	Quezon City
Pulang Lupa Uno	31,401	1742	Las Piñas
Pulang Lupa Dos	33,171	1742	Las Piñas
Punturin	20,930	1447	Valenzuela
Putatan	89,022	1772 / 1775	Muntinlupa

=== Q ===
Name	Population (2015)	ZIP Code	City/Municipality
Quiapo (District)	28,478	1001	City of Manila
Quirino 2-A	5,520	1102	Quezon City
Quirino 2-B	3,612	1102	Quezon City
Quirino 2-C	2,830	1102	Quezon City
Quirino 3-A	1,141	1102	Quezon City

=== R ===
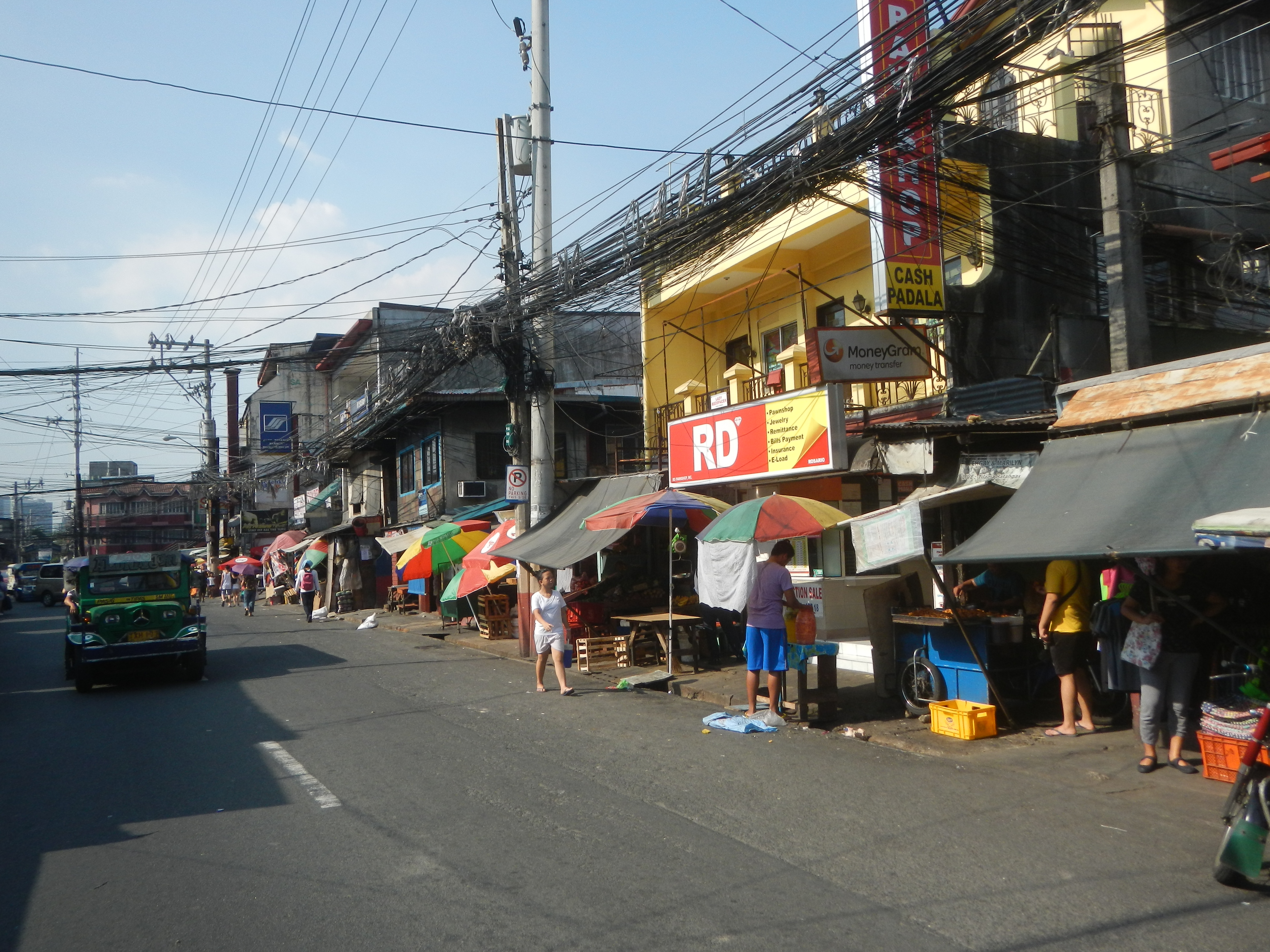
Shops along Amang Rodriguez Avenue in Rosario

Name	Population (2015)	ZIP Code	City/Municipality
Ramon Magsaysay	16,281	1105	Quezon City
Rincon	6,603	1444	Valenzuela
Rivera	2,208	1500	San Juan
Rizal	44,536	1649	Taguig
Rosario	61,920	1609	Pasig
Roxas	16,060	1103	Quezon City

=== S ===
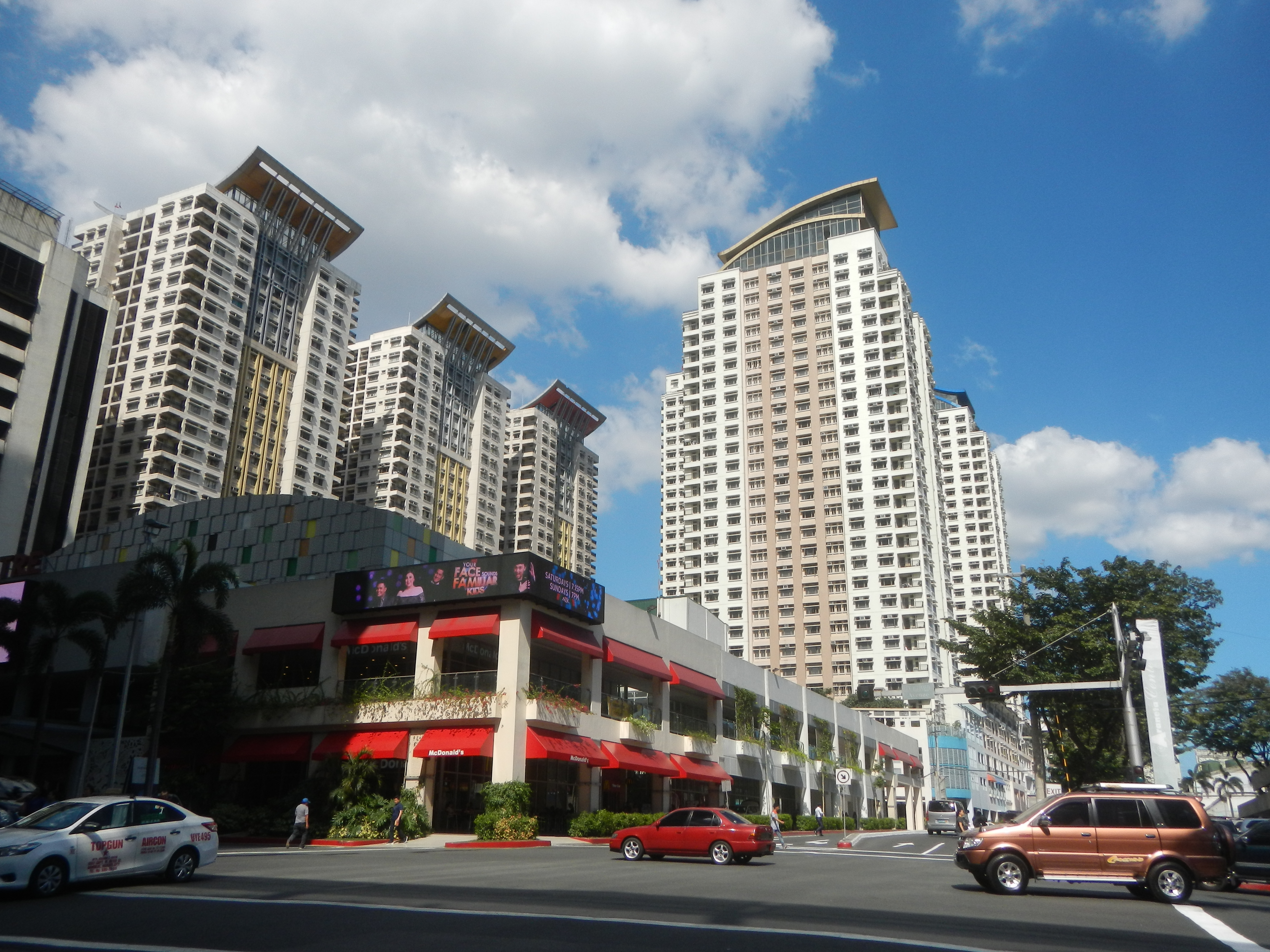
Residential condominium buildings in Socorro

Name	Population (2015)	ZIP Code	City/Municipality
Sacred Heart	8,282	1103	Quezon City
Sagad	7,064	1600	Pasig
Salapan	8,747	1500	San Juan
Salvacion	8,056	1114	Quezon City
Sampaloc (District)	375,119	1008 / 1015	City of Manila
San Agustin	11,195	1470	Malabon
San Agustin	22,423	1117	Quezon City
San Andres (District)		1017	City of Manila
San Antonio	16,840	1203	Makati
San Antonio	67,401	1715 / 1707	Parañaque
San Antonio	21,224	1605	Pasig
San Antonio	25,043	1105	Quezon City
San Bartolome	45,188	1116	Quezon City
San Dionisio	63,506	1700	Parañaque
San Isidro	8,045	1234	Makati
San Isidro	78,912	1700 (Note: Parañaque Central Post Office)	Parañaque
San Isidro	8,578	1113	Quezon City
San Isidro Labrador	7,181	1114	Quezon City
San Joaquin	13,207	1601	Pasig
San Jose	7,262	1550	Mandaluyong
San Jose	25,581	1409	Navotas
San Jose	1,407	1600	Pasig
San Jose	6,271	1115	Quezon City
San Lorenzo	12,995	1223 / 1229	Makati
San Martin de Porres	21,181	1713	Parañaque
San Martin de Porres	12,315	1111	Quezon City
San Miguel (District)	17,464	1005	City of Manila
San Miguel	30,960	1600	Pasig
San Miguel	8,590	1630	Taguig
San Nicolas (District)	43,069	1010	City of Manila
San Nicolas	2,113	1600	Pasig
San Pedro		1620	Pateros
San Perfecto	4,293	1500	San Juan
San Rafael Village	3,595	1412	Navotas
San Roque	17,945	1801	Marikina
San Roque	19,641	1409	Navotas
San Roque		1620	Pateros
San Roque	20,095	1109	Quezon City
San Vicente	7,274	1101	Quezon City
Sangandaan		1408	Caloocan
Sangandaan	24,061	1116	Quezon City
Santa Ana (District)	195,155	1009	City of Manila
Santa Ana		1621	Pateros
Santa Ana	18,057	1637	Taguig
Santa Cruz (District)	132,193	1003 / 1014	City of Manila
Santa Cruz	7,207	1205	Makati
Santa Cruz	5,562	1600	Pasig
Santa Cruz	4,784	1104	Quezon City
Santa Elena	6,928	1800 (Note: Marikina Central Post Office)	Marikina
Santa Lucia	44,538	1608	Pasig
Santa Lucia	25,577	1117	Quezon City
Santa Lucia	7,657	1500	San Juan
Santa Mesa (District)		1016	City of Manila
Santa Monica	46,553	1117	Quezon City
Santa Quiteria		1402	Caloocan
Santa Rosa	1,025	1600	Pasig
Santa Teresita	8,377	1114	Quezon City
Santo Cristo	10,392	1105	Quezon City
Santo Domingo	13,989	1114	Quezon City
Santo Niño	30,759	1800	Marikina
Santo Niño	34,860	1704 / 1705	Parañaque
Santo Niño	10,278	1113	Quezon City
Santo Rosario Kanluran		1620	Pateros
Santo Rosario Silangan		1620	Pateros
Santo Tomas	9,338	1600	Pasig
Santol	7,548	1113	Quezon City
Santolan	13,769	1478	Malabon
Santolan	53,254	1610	Pasig
Sauyo	76,039	1116	Quezon City
Siena	3,383	1114	Quezon City
Sikatuna Village	6,996	1101	Quezon City
Silangan	5,036	1102	Quezon City
Singkamas	7,370	1204	Makati
Sipac-Almacen	8,635	1409	Navotas
Socorro	25,073	1109	Quezon City
South Cembo	14,978	1645	Taguig
South Daang Hari	19,166	1630	Taguig
South Signal Village	39,214	1633	Taguig
South Triangle	15,546	1103	Quezon City
St. Ignatius	2,005	1110	Quezon City
St. Joseph (Halo-halo)	660	1500	San Juan
St. Peter	4,550	1114	Quezon City
Sucat	57,504	1770 (Note: Muntinlupa Central Post Office)	Muntinlupa
Sumilang	5,358	1600	Pasig
Sun Valley	48,913	1710	Parañaque

=== T ===
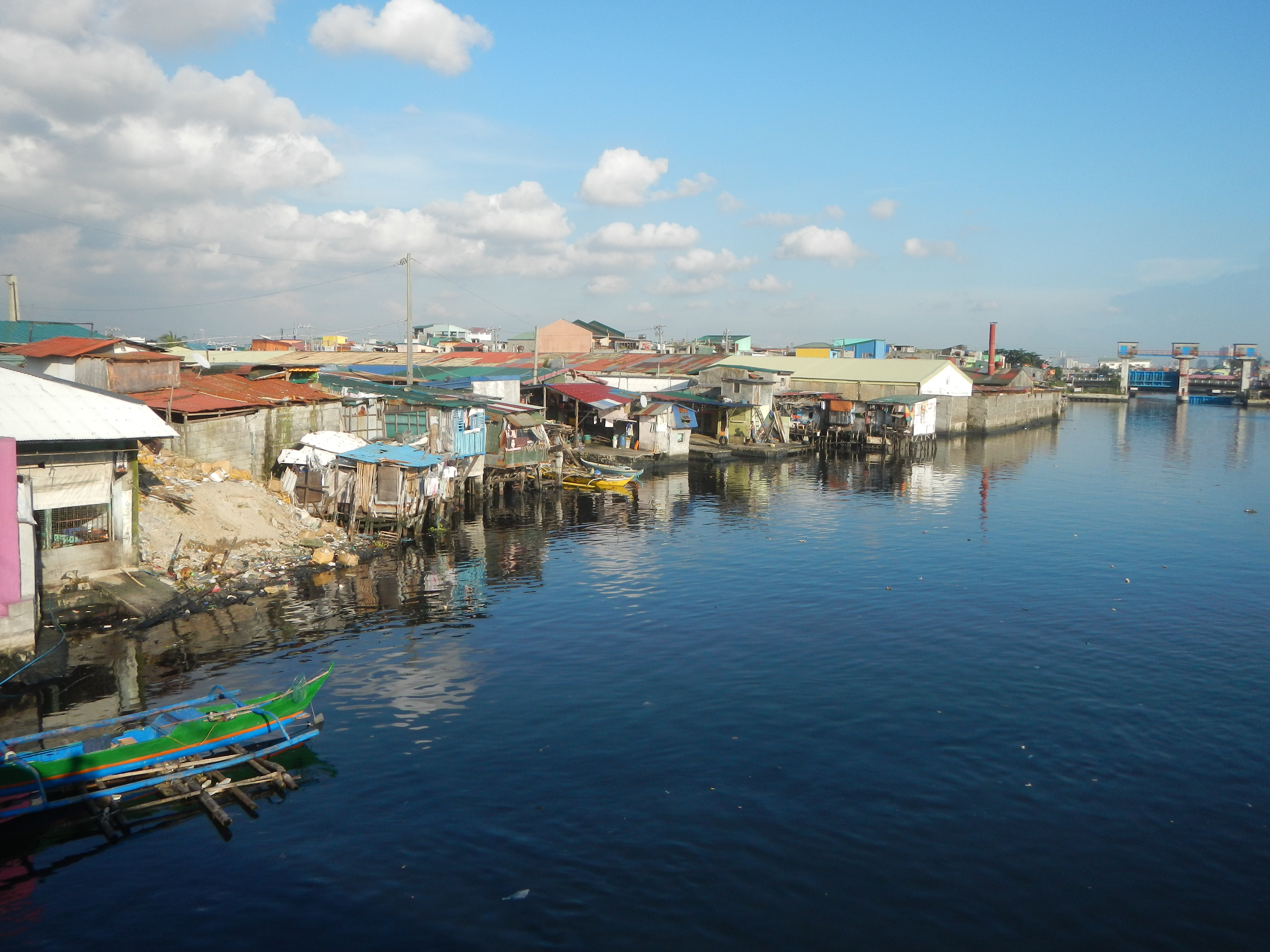
Stilt houses in Tanza

Name	Population (2020)	ZIP Code	City/Municipality
Tabacalera	2,805	1620	Pateros
Tagalag	3,400	1444	Valenzuela
Tagumpay	2,257	1109	Quezon City
Tala	139,179	1427	Caloocan
Talayan	4,402	1104	Quezon City
Talipapa	19,471	1400	Caloocan
Talipapa	38,949	1116	Quezon City
Talon Uno	42,505	1747	Las Piñas
Talon Dos	43,978	1747	Las Piñas
Talon Tres	32,963	1747	Las Piñas
Talon Cuatro	20,763	1749	Las Piñas
Talon Singko	38,684	1747	Las Piñas
Tambo	26,928	1701 / 1703	Parañaque
Tandang Sora	83,114	1116	Quezon City
Tangos North	17,514	1489	Navotas
Tangos South	18,359	1489	Navotas
Tanyag	23,719	1630	Taguig
Tanza 1	15,319	1490	Navotas
Tanza 2	15,638	1490	Navotas
Tañong	14,461	1470	Malabon
Tañong	8,902	1803	Marikina
Tatalon	55,404	1113	Quezon City
Teacher's Village East	2,401	1101	Quezon City
Teacher's Village West	2,986	1101	Quezon City
Tejeros	15,122	1204	Makati
Tibagan	3,817	1500	San Juan
Tinajeros	18,411	1470	Malabon
Tondo (District)	654,220	1012 / 1013	City of Manila
Tonsuya	49,172	1473	Malabon
Tugatog	25,526	1470	Malabon
Tuktukan	11,614	1637	Taguig
Tumana	47,468	1800	Marikina
Tunasan	61,374	1773 / 1774	Muntinlupa

=== U ===
Name	Population (2020)	ZIP Code	City/Municipality
Ugong	28,737	1604	Pasig
Ugong	55,494	1440	Valenzuela
Ugong Norte	6,301	1110	Quezon City
Unang Sigaw	6,508	1106	Quezon City
University Hills	5,175	1407	Caloocan
UP Campus	47,127	1101	Quezon City
UP Village	3,167	1101	Quezon City
Upper Bicutan	44,592	1633	Taguig
Urdaneta	4,563	1225	Makati
Urduja (Village)	22,829	1400	Caloocan
Ususan	53,956	1639	Taguig

=== V ===
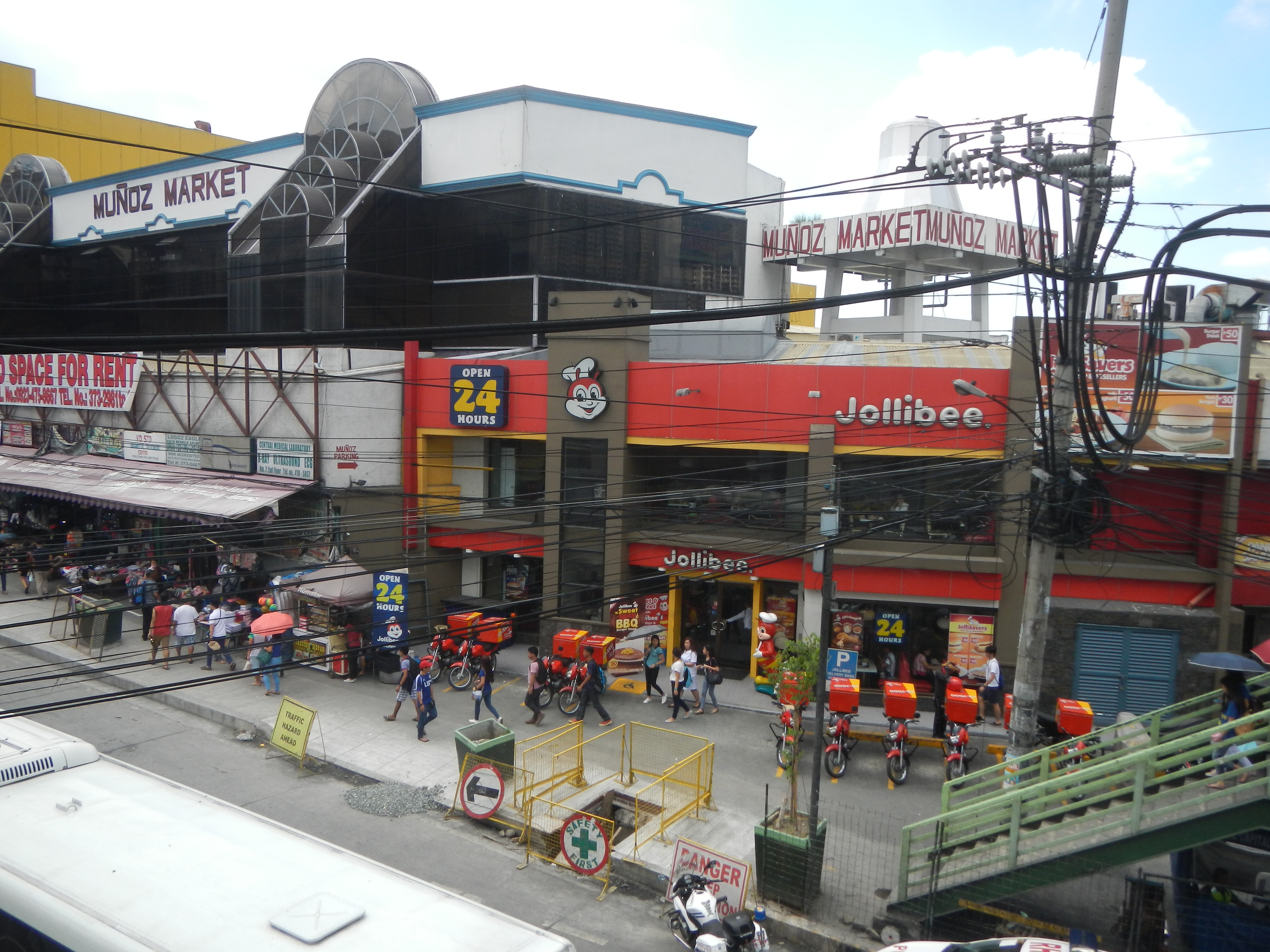
Retail market in Veterans Village

Name	Population (2020)	ZIP Code	City/Municipality
Valencia	10,900	1112	Quezon City
Valenzuela	5,370	1208	Makati
Valenzuela (Pob.)	221	1440	Valenzuela
Vasra	7,345	1128	Quezon City
Veinte Reales	24,399	1440	Valenzuela
Vergara	4,357	1551	Mandaluyong
Veterans Village	12,755	1105	Quezon City
Villa Maria Clara	2,442	1109	Quezon City
Vitalez	5,100	1700	Parañaque

=== W ===
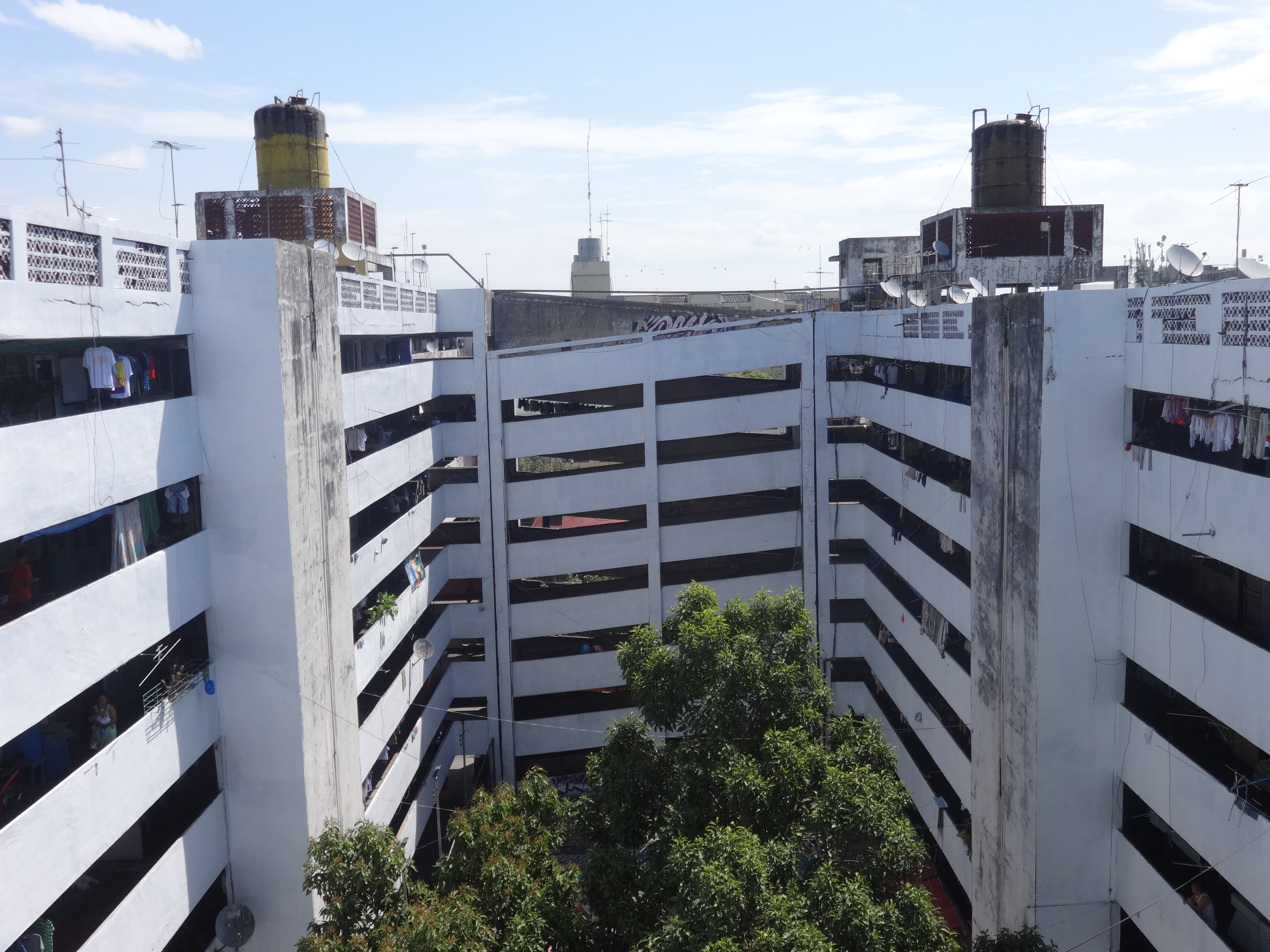
Public housing in Western Bicutan

Name	Population (2020)	ZIP Code	City/Municipality
Wack-Wack Greenhills	10,678	1555 / 1556	Mandaluyong
Wawa	14,350	1630	Taguig
Wawang Pulo	4,070	1440	Valenzuela
West Crame	16,353	1505	San Juan
West Kamias	4,055	1102	Quezon City
West Rembo	29,649	1644	Taguig
West Triangle	2,431	1104	Quezon City
Western Bicutan	87,508	1630	Taguig
White Plains	3,558	1110	Quezon City

=== Z ===
Name	Population (2020)	ZIP Code	City/Municipality
Zapote	20,851	1742	Las Piñas

== See also ==
- Administrative divisions of Metro Manila
- List of Metro Manila placename etymologies
- List of barangays in Marikina
- List of barangays in Quezon City
- List of barangays in Valenzuela
