= List of Metro Manila placename etymologies =

This is a list of sources of the place names in the Philippine capital region of Metro Manila.

== Place names ==
Place Name	Location	Root
Alabang	Muntinlupa	named after the Alabang River that passes through the area, labeled as "Rio de Alban" in the 1852 Coello-Morata Case Map.
Alicia	Quezon City	Alicia Syquía de Quirino, wife of President Elpidio Quirino. Killed with her children by the Japanese during World War II before her husband's rule.
Arkong Bato	Valenzuela	Filipino for "stone arch", referring to the structure built by the American colonial Insular Government. It demarcated the border of the then-towns of Polo and Malabon, and their respective provinces of Rizal and Bulacan.
Baclaran	Parañaque	Spanish rendering of the old Tagalog name bakladan/baklaran which means a place of rattan fence (baklád) used as fish corral.
Bagong Ilog	Pasig	Filipino for "new river."
Bagong Lipunan ng Crame	Quezon City	Filipino phrase which means "New Society of Crame." It is named after Camp Crame, which was named after Rafael Crame.
Bagong Pagasa	Quezon City	Filipino for "new hope."
Bagumbayan	Quezon City, Navotas and Taguig	Filipino for "new town."
Balong Bato	San Juan	Balóng bató, the Filipino word for "stone well."
Bambang	Pasig and Taguig	Filipino word for "riverbank”, synonymous with “pampáng”.
Barangka, Barangka Drive, Barangka Ibaba, Barangka Ilaya and Barangka Itaas	Marikina and Mandaluyong	Tagalisation of old Spanish "Barranca," meaning canyon or river gorge. Ibabà is Filipino for "lower”, Ilaya means "inland" or "interior," and Itaás means "upper."
Baseco	Manila; Port Area	Acronym for "Bataan Shipping and Engineering Company," owner of the dockyard where the settlement was founded.
Batis	San Juan	Filipino term for "rivulet" or "creek" which dominated the area.
Bayanihan	Quezon City	Filipino word for "community brotherhood."
BF Homes Caloocan, BF Homes Parañaque and BF International Village	Caloocan, Parañaque and Las Piñas	Banco Filipino, the gated communities' developer
Bicutan (Central Bicutan, Lower Bicutan, Upper Bicutan and Western Bicutan)	Taguig	Old Tagalog word, meaning "to dig", referring to the digging for treasures in the area in its early history.
Bignay	Valenzuela	Named for the bignay tree.
Binondo	Manila	Spanish rendering of the old Tagalog name binundok, meaning mountainous or hilly.
Buli	Muntinlupa	Named for the buri palm.
Bungad	Quezon City	Filipino word for "front."
Calumpang	Marikina	Spanish rendering of "kalumpang", a type of tropical chestnuts.
Camp Aguinaldo	Quezon City	Emilio Aguinaldo, first president of the Philippines
Camp Crame and West Crame	Quezon City and San Juan	Rafael Crame, sixth chief of the Philippine Constabulary and the first Filipino to hold the position.
Caniogan	Pasig	Filipino word for "a place where coconut grows."
Carmona	Makati	Isidro Carmona, Filipino soldier during the Philippine Revolution and Philippine–American War.
Cembo and South Cembo	Taguig	Acronym for "Central Enlisted Men's Barrio."
Comembo	Taguig	Acronym for "Combat Enlisted Men's Barrio."
Cubao	Quezon City	Spanish rendering of kubaw, a local species of banana.
Cupang	Muntinlupa	Named for the cupang tree.
Daang Bakal	Mandaluyong	Filipino word for "railroad," in reference to the village's location along a former Manila tranvía (tram) line and as the former location of one of the four tranvía stations in the former San Felipe Neri municipality.
Dalandanan	Valenzuela	Named for the local orange trees (dalandan) that stood in the area.
Damayan Lagi	Quezon City	Filipino phrase, meaning "perpetual help."
Dasmariñas Village	Makati	Gómez Pérez Dasmariñas, Spanish governor-general.
San Francisco del Monte (SFDM) / Del Monte	Quezon City	Named after St. Francis. Del Monte (from the mountain) was affixed to the name distinguish it from San Francisco de Manila, a Franciscan church in Intramuros, Manila.
Diliman	Quezon City	From dilim, a type of fern.
Divisoria	Manila; Tondo and Binondo	Spanish for "dividing line" (línea divisoria)
Don Bosco	Parañaque	Saint John Bosco.
Don Galo	Parañaque	Galo of Parañaque, a local hero of the 1574 Battle of Manila.
Don Manuel	Quezon City	Manuel L. Quezon, second president of the Philippines.
Doña Aurora	Quezon City	Aurora Quezon, first lady of the Philippines.
Doña Imelda	Quezon City	Imelda Marcos, first lady of the Philippines.
Doña Josefa	Quezon City	Josefa Edralin Marcos, mother of Philippine president Ferdinand Marcos.
E. Rodriguez	Quezon City	Eulogio Rodriguez, Filipino senator.
Ermita	Manila	Spanish for "hermitage" or solitary place.
Ermitaño	San Juan	Spanish word for "hermit."
Escopa (I, II, III and IV)	Quezon City	Acronym for "First Company of the Philippine Army."
Forbes Park	Makati	William Cameron Forbes, American governor-general.
Fort Bonifacio	Taguig	Andrés Bonifacio, Filipino revolutionary and hero.
Fortune	Marikina	Fortune Tobacco Corporation, a cigarette manufacturing company based in the village.
Gen. T. de Leon	Valenzuela	Tiburcio de León, Filipino general and revolutionary
Greenhills	San Juan	Greenhills (mixed-use development) and Greenhills, Ohio, USA
Guadalupe Nuevo and Guadalupe Viejo	Makati	Our Lady of Guadalupe
Hagonoy	Taguig	Named for the hagonoy plant that was prevalent in the area.
Hulo	Mandaluyong	Old Tagalog word for "outer part" or "external" referring to the barrio's location from the town's poblacion.
Intramuros	Manila	Latin for "within the walls."
Isabelita	San Juan	Isabelita Barredo, matriarch of a local real estate company that owned and developed the Isabelita Heights gated village in the area.
Jesus dela Peña	Marikina	Jesús de la Peña ("Jesus of the Rocks"), an Order of Saint Augustine parish founded in the area during the Spanish colonial era.
Kaligayahan	Quezon City	Filipino word for "happiness."
Kalusugan	Quezon City	Filipino word for "health."
Kapitolyo	Pasig	Filipino word for "capitol," a corruption of the Spanish word capitolio. Named for its proximity to the former Rizal provincial capitol.
Karuhatan	Valenzuela	From the Tagalog word kaduhatan, meaning "where duhat (black plum) trees grow."
Katipunan	Quezon City	Katipunan, a Filipino revolutionary society.
Kaunlaran	Quezon City	Filipino word for "progress."
Krus na Ligas	Quezon City	Named for a local type of nut tree which took the form of a cross.
La Huerta	Parañaque	Spanish for "the orchard."
La Loma	Quezon City	Spanish for "the knoll."
Laging Handa	Quezon City	Filipino for "always prepared," the motto of the Boy Scouts of the Philippines after whom the village was named.
Little Baguio	San Juan	Baguio, Cordillera
Loyola Heights	Quezon City and Marikina	Saint Ignatius of Loyola
Mabini–J. Rizal	Mandaluyong	Apolinario Mabini, Filipino statesman and revolutionary, and José Rizal, Filipino national hero. The village was named for its location at the junction of Mabini and Rizal streets.
Magallanes	Makati	Ferdinand Magellan, Portuguese explorer.
Magsaysay	Quezon City	Ramon Magsaysay, seventh president of the Philippines.
Maharlika and Maharlika Village	Quezon City and Taguig	Old Tagalog word for "noble".
Malamig	Mandaluyong	Filipino word which means "Cold."
Malanday	Valenzuela and Marikina	Old Tagalog word which means "a bowl plate" or "round and flat" in reference to the shape of the territory similar to a winnower.
Malate	Manila	Spanish rendering of the Tagalog word maalat meaning salty.
Malaya	Quezon City	Filipino word which means "free."
Malibay	Pasay	Old Tagalog word for "a place teeming with herds of deer (libay)."
Malinta	Valenzuela	Filipino word for "where there are many leeches" (lintâ).
Mapulang Lupa	Valenzuela	Named after the reddish earth found in this barangay.
Marilag	Quezon City	Old Tagalog word for "beautiful."
Mariana	Mariana	Mariana Wilson, a community leader and one of the original residents of New Manila.
Marulas	Valenzuela	Old Tagalog word for "slippery", in reference to the muddy topography of the area where a stud farm once stood.
Masagana	Quezon City	Filipino word for "bountiful."
Maypajo	Caloocan	Contraction of the Tagalog phrase "may pajotan" ("where there is pajotan"), a variety of mango that grew in abundance in the area.
Maysan	Valenzuela	Filipino word for "corn field."
Milagrosa	Quezon City	Spanish and Filipino word for "miraculous."
N.S. Amoranto	Quezon City	Norberto Amoranto, fifth mayor of Quezon City.
Nagkaisang Nayon	Quezon City	Filipino phrase which means "united village."
Nangka	Marikina	Filipino word for "jackfruit".
Napindan	Taguig	Old Tagalog word which means "pierced through," referring to the creation of a water channel in the area linking Laguna de Bay and the Pasig River.
Novaliches	Quezon City	The district of Novaliches in Jérica, Valencian Community, Spain where governor-general Manuel Pavía y Lacy was honored as its first marquess.
Olympia	Makati	Olympia, a tile and brick factory that once stood in the area on the banks of the Pasig River ca. 1925.
Onse	San Juan	Block number 11 (onse in Filipino)
Paang Bundok	Quezon City	Filipino for "mountain foot"
Paco	Manila	Spanish rendering of the old Tagalog name for edible vegetable fern (pako).
Pagibig sa Nayon	Quezon City	Filipino phrase which means "love of village."
Paligsahan	Quezon City	Filipino word for "competition."
Palingon	Taguig	Filipino word for "to look back."
Pandacan	Manila	Spanish rendering of the old Tagalog word for the place "where the pandan plant (Pandanus gracilis) grows."
Paraiso	Quezon City	Spanish and Filipino word for "paradise."
Pariancillo Villa	Valenzuela	Spanish for small parián or market place.
Pasadena	San Juan	Contraction of Paso de Cadena de Amor (Coral Vine Way), in reference to the prevalence of coral vines (cadena de amor in Filipino) in the village.
Paso de Blas	Valenzuela	Spanish for "Blaise's pass", named in honor of the village patron, Saint Blaise.
Pembo	Taguig	Acronym for "Panthers Enlisted Men's Barrio."
Phil-Am	Quezon City	Philam Life, the gated village's developer.
Pio del Pilar	Makati	Pío del Pilar, Filipino general during the Philippine Revolution and Philippine–American War.
Pinagkaisahan	Quezon City and Makati	Filipino word for "united."
Pinagsama	Taguig	Filipino word for "united" or "combined" in reference to the joining of seven villages.
Polo	Valenzuela	Spanish rendering of the Tagalog word "pulo"" which means "island."
Progreso	San Juan	Spanish for "progress."
Pulang Lupa (Pulang Lupa Uno and Pulang Lupa Dos)	Las Piñas	Filipino for "red earth," in reference to its old industry of tisa or brick production.
Putatan	Muntinlupa	From putat, a local variety of flowering plants in the Lecythidaceae family that was common in the lakeside village.
Quiapo	Manila	Spanish rendering of the old Tagalog name kiyapo, a type of water cabbage common in the area.
Quirino (1, 2A, 2B, 2C and 3A)	Quezon City	Elpidio Quirino, sixth president of the Philippines.
Rembo (East Rembo and West Rembo)	Taguig	Acronym for "Riverside Enlisted Men's Barrio."
Rincon	Valenzuela	Spanish for "corner."
Rizal	Taguig	José Rizal, Filipino national hero.
Roxas	Quezon City	Manuel Roxas, fifth president of the Philippines.
Salapan	San Juan	from salapang, a local "bamboo spear" that was used by early settlers to catch fish in the Salapan creek.
Salvacion	Quezon City	Spanish for "salvation."
Sampaloc	Manila	Spanish rendering of the Tagalog word sampalok (tamarind).
Sangandaan	Caloocan	Filipino word for "crossroad."
Santa Mesa	Manila	Spanish for "holy table," a contraction of "Hermandad de Santa Mesa de la Misericordia" (Brotherhood of the Holy Table of Mercy).
Socorro	Quezon City	Nuestra Señora del Perpetuo Socorro (Our Lady of Perpetual Help), the village patron.
Sucat	Muntinlupa	Spanish rendering of the Tagalog word for "measurement" (sukat).
Tagumpay	Quezon City	Filipino word for "victory."
Tambo	Parañaque	Filipino word for tiger grass.
Tandang Sora	Quezon City	Melchora Aquino, Filipina independence activist.
Tibagan	San Juan	Filipino for "a place where they crush boulders," in reference to a limestone quarry that operated in the area.
Tipas (Calzada-Tipas, Ibayo-Tipas and Ligid-Tipas)	Taguig	Old Tagalog word for "detour", referring to a meander in the river. Calzada is Spanish for "roadway," Ibayo is Old Tagalog for "opposite side," and Ligid is Old Tagalog for "surrounding."
Tondo	Manila	Spanish rendering of the old Tagalog name tundok, a type of river mangrove that was prevalent in the area.
Tuktukan	Taguig	Old Tagalog word for "a place where people wash clothes."
Tunasan	Muntinlupa	Named for tunas, a type of water lily.
Ugong and Ugong Norte	Pasig, Valenzuela and Quezon City	Filipino word for "roaring sound" of a river, referring to the Marikina River in Ugong, Pasig and Tullahan River in Ugong, Valenzuela.
Unang Sigaw	Quezon City	Filipino for "first cry" in reference to the village's role in the Cry of Pugad Lawin.
Urdaneta Village	Makati	Andrés de Urdaneta, Spanish circumnavigator.
Ususan	Taguig	Old Tagalog word for "a place where the river drains or slides."
Veinte Reales	Valenzuela	Spanish for "twenty reals" referring to the cost of the land purchased during the Spanish colonial era.
Wack-Wack	Mandaluyong	English rendering of the uwak, a type of local large-billed crow.
Wawa	Taguig	Old Tagalog word for "upstream."

== See also ==
- List of eponymous streets in Metro Manila
- List of barangays of Metro Manila
