= Project 6, Quezon City =

Barangay in Quezon City, Metro Manila, Philippines

Project 6
- Barangay
- Barangay Project 6
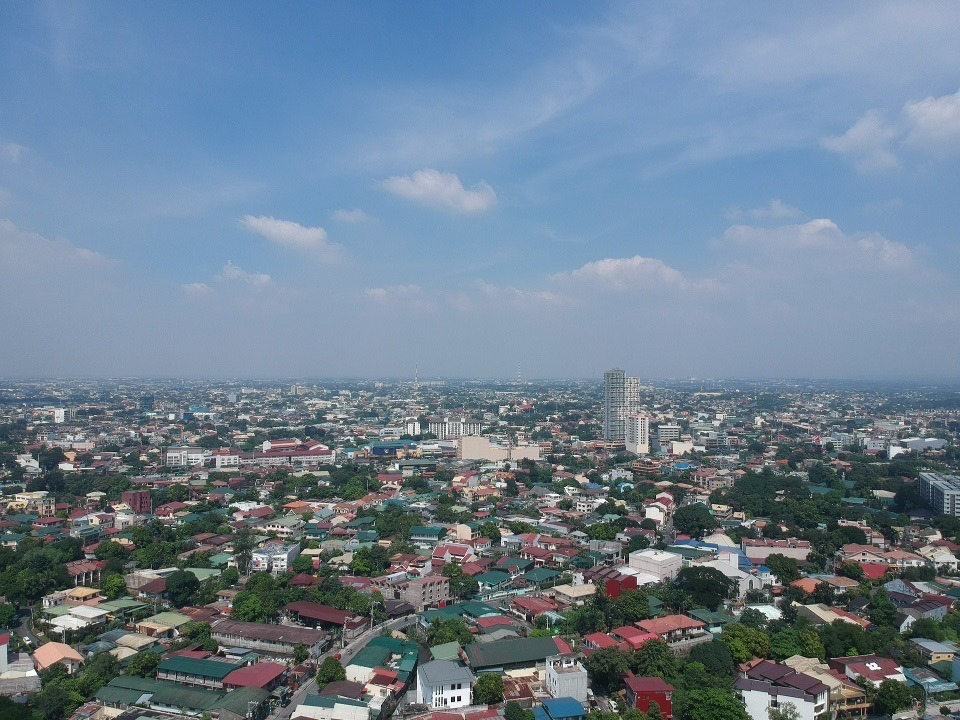
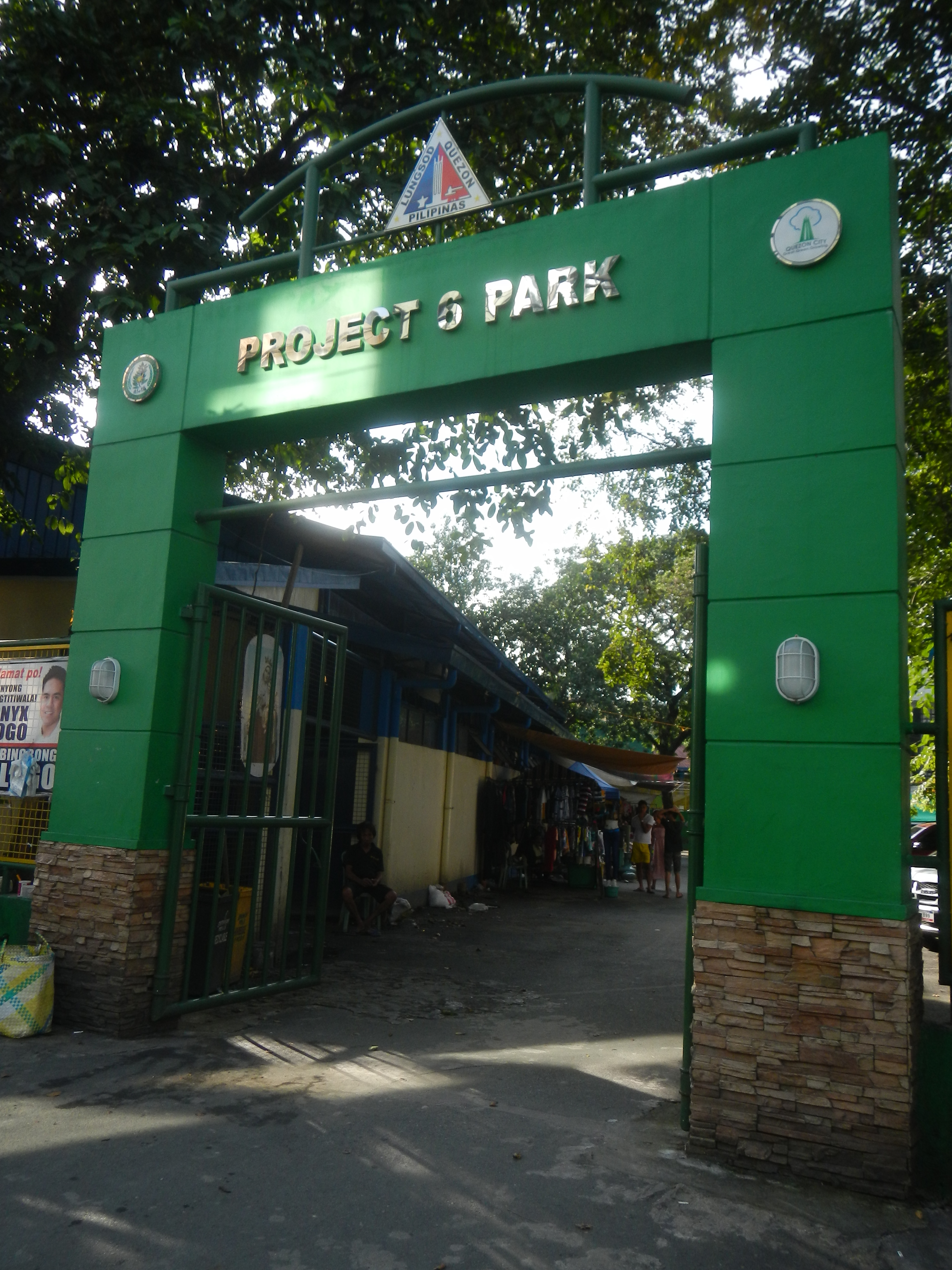
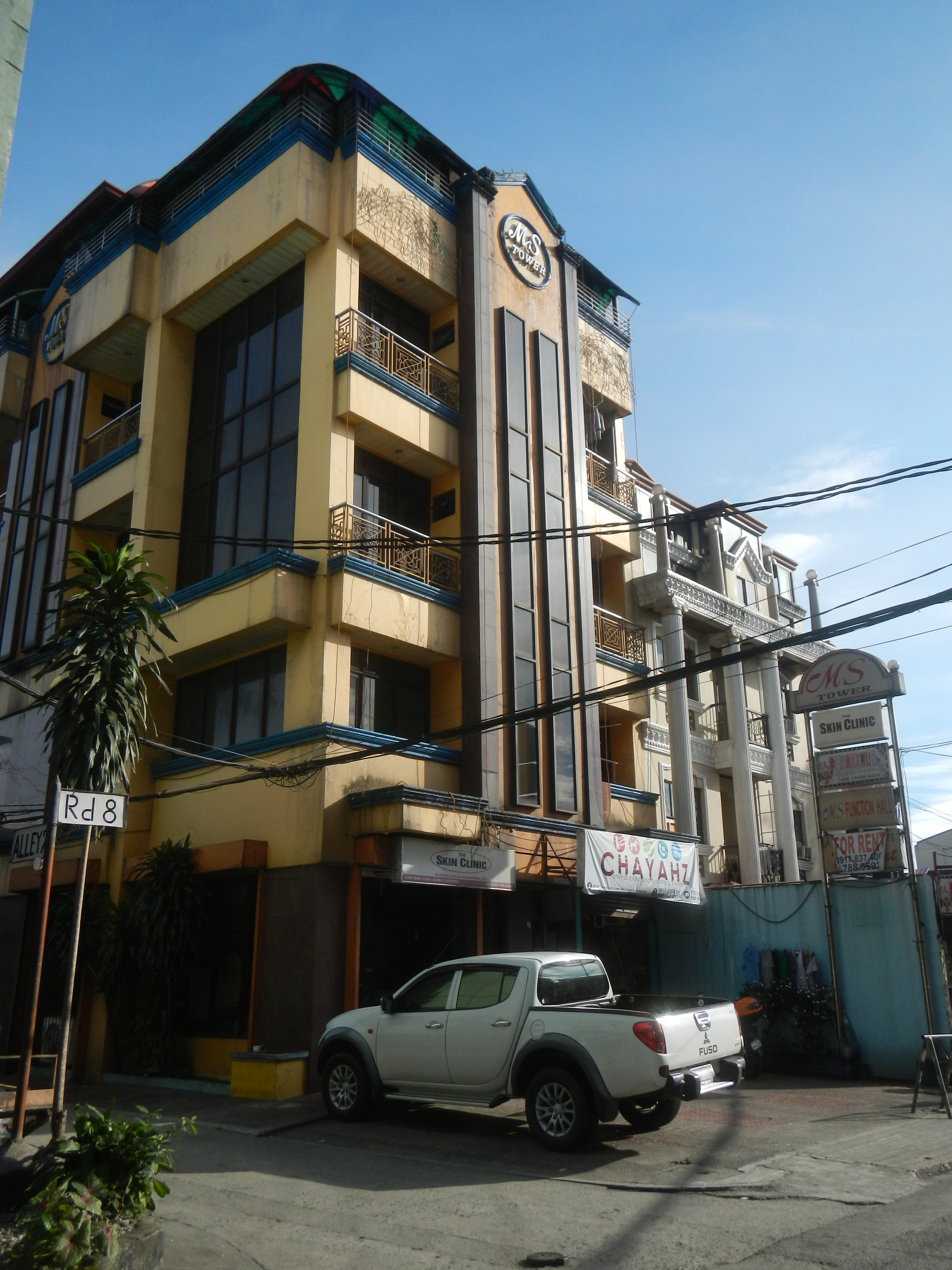
- Clockwise from top: Project 6 aerial view, MS Tower, and Project 6 Park

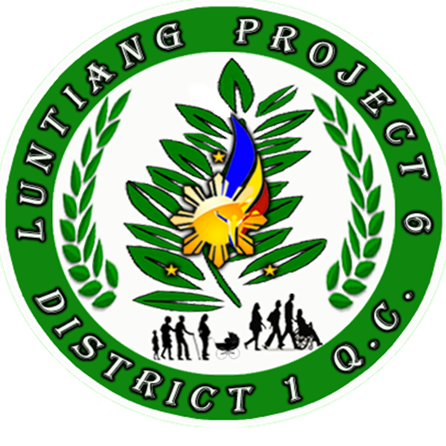
- Seal

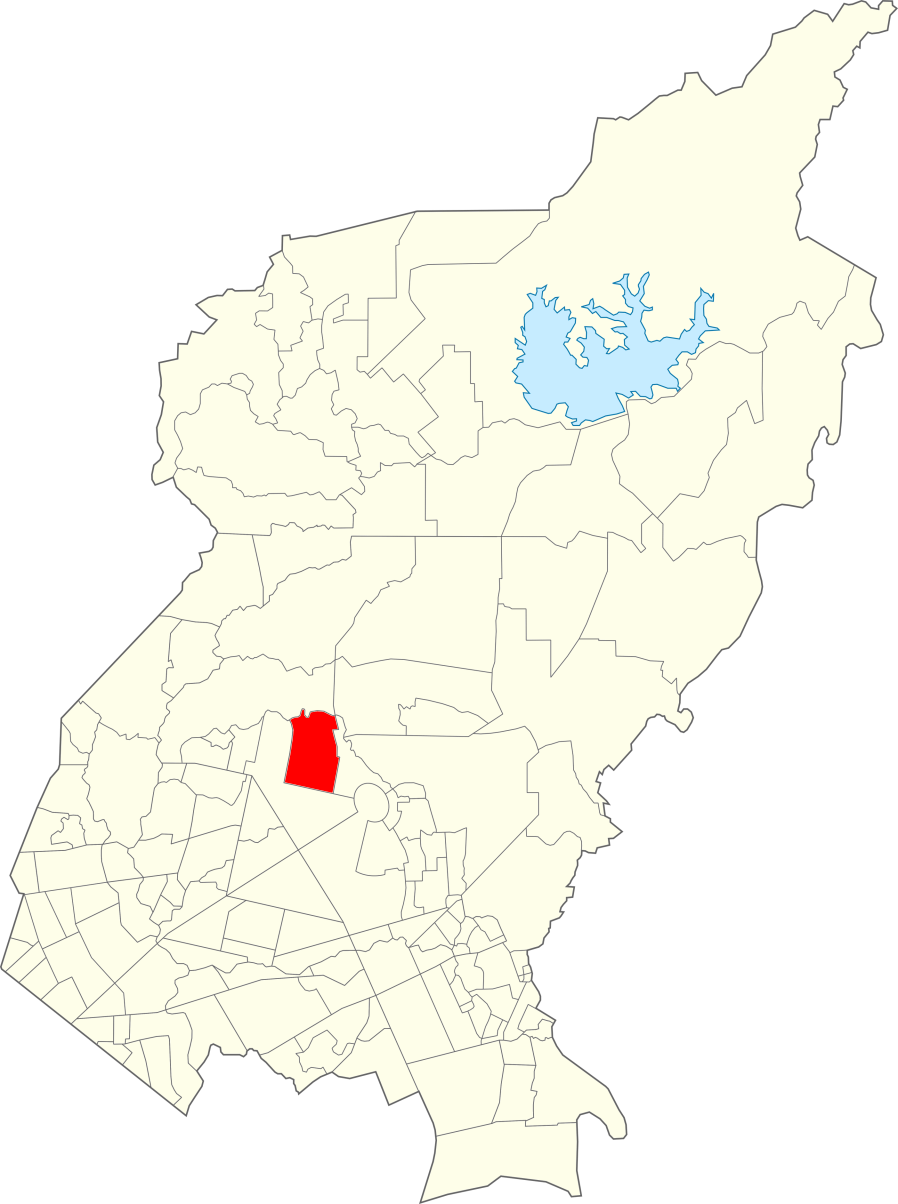
- Location within Quezon City

- Location within Metro Manila Location within the Philippines
- Country: Philippines
- Region: National Capital Region
- Congressional District: 1st District
- City: Quezon City
- Seat: Project 6 Barangay Hall

Government
  - Type: Barangay
  - Body: Project 6 Barangay Council
  - Barangay Captain: Ma. Cecilia M. Agcaoili
- Elevation: 45.3 m (148.6 ft)

Population (2015)
  - Total: 15,255
  - Rank: 50th
- Time zone: UTC+8 (Philippine Standard Time)
- ZIP Code: 1100
- Area code: 2
- Website: Quezon City Official Website; Facebook Page

Project 6 (PSGC: 137404084) is a barangay of the 1st legislative district of Quezon City, Metro Manila, Philippines. Project 6 is mainly a residential area with neighboring barangays having high-rise buildings like TriNoma, Ayala Malls Vertis North, Word of Hope Christian Family Church Main, and SM City North EDSA. Almost half of Project 6's land are attributed to Veterans Memorial Golf Course, located in the southern half of Project 6 where Veterans Memorial Medical Center could be found as well.

Neighboring barangays include Vasra, Bagong Pag-asa, and Bahay Toro.

It has an elementary school named Project 6 Elementary School near the Mt. Carmel Church.

== Barangay and Sangguniang Kabataan officials ==
=== Members of Sangguniang Barangay ===
Title	Name
Barangay Captain Punong Barangay	Ma. Cecilia M. Agcaoili
SK Chairperson Sangguniang Kabataan	Khyzzer B. Sabello

The incumbent Barangay and SK Councils were elected in the 2023 Philippine barangay and Sangguniang Kabataan elections on October 30, 2023.

== Demographics ==
In the 2015 Philippine Housing and Population Census, Project 6 ranked 50th in Quezon City with a total population of 15,255.
