= Buli, Muntinlupa =

Barangay in Muntinlupa City, Metro Manila, Philippines

Buli
- Barangay
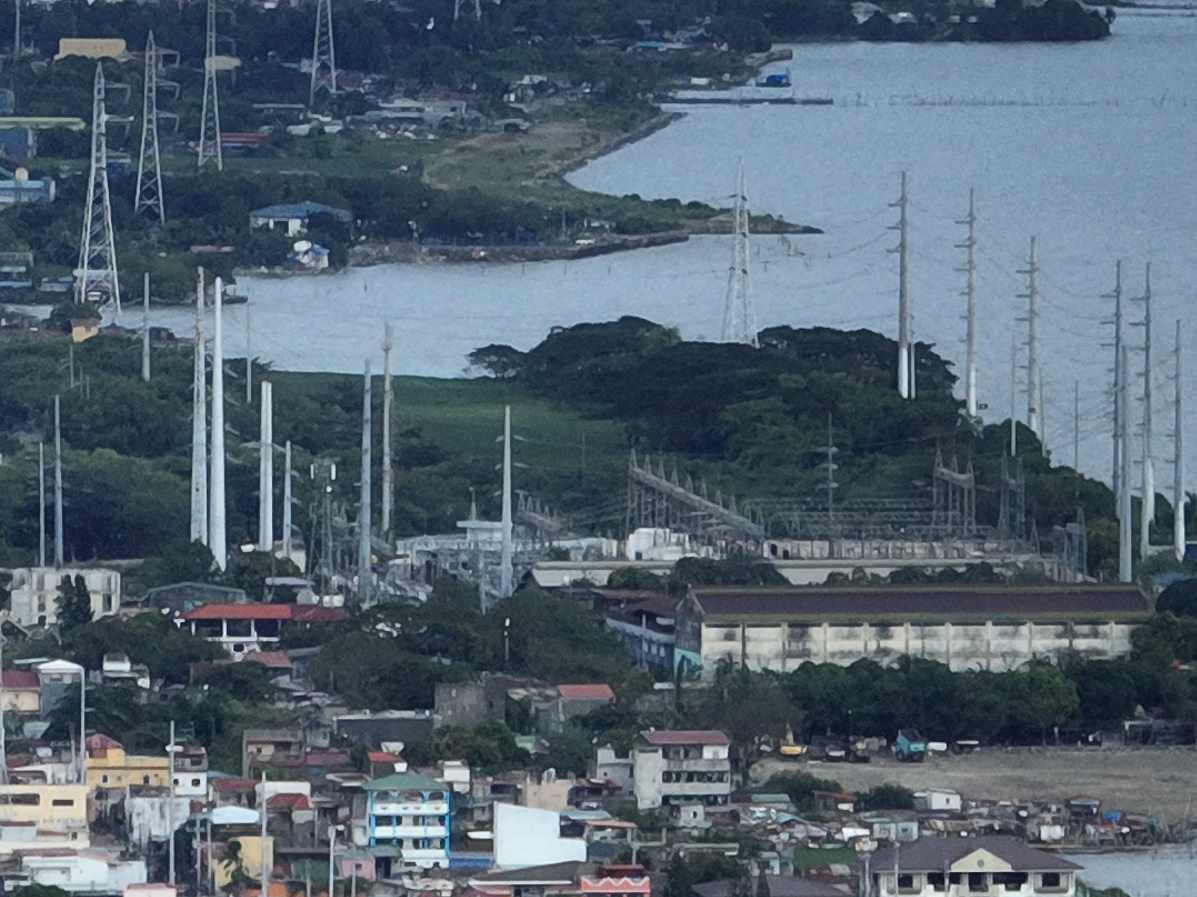
- Aerial view with Buli on the foreground
- Interactive map of Buli
- Location in Metro Manila Location in Luzon Location in the Philippines
- Country: Philippines
- Region: Metro Manila
- City: Muntinlupa
- Legislative district: 2nd district of Muntinlupa

Government
  - Barangay Chairman: Ronaldo Loresca
  - SK Chairperson: Jonas Angelo Abadilla

Area
  - Total: 0.437 km^{2} (0.169 sq mi)

Population (2020 Census)
  - Total: 13,341
  - Density: 30,500/km^{2} (79,100/sq mi)
- ZIP code: 1771
- Dialing Code: +63 (0)02

Buli is a barangay in Muntinlupa, Metro Manila, Philippines. The total land area of the barangay is 0.437 km^{2} (0.169 sq mi), making it the smallest barangay in the city. As of 2020, the population of Buli was 13,341, making it the least populated barangay in Muntinlupa. It is located in the northern section of the city.

Buli is located 19 kilometres (12 mi) south of Manila. It is bounded on the north by the Muntinlupa barangay of Sucat, on the south by the Muntinlupa barangay of Cupang, and on the east by Laguna de Bay.

== History ==
Buli is said to be named after the buri palm that is abundant in the area.

== Demographics ==
Year	Population
2007	8,842
2010	7,319
2015	9,292
2020	13,341
2024	14,802

== Education ==
The Department of Education (DepEd) is responsible for basic education in the Philippines. The Commission on Higher Education (CHED) is responsible for Higher Education in the Philippines.

Schools located in the barangay are as follows:

- Muntinlupa Business High School
- Buli Elementary School
- U-BIX Institute of Technology, Inc.

== See also ==
- Muntinlupa
