= Cupang, Muntinlupa =

Barangay in Muntinlupa City, Metro Manila, Philippines

Cupang
- Barangay
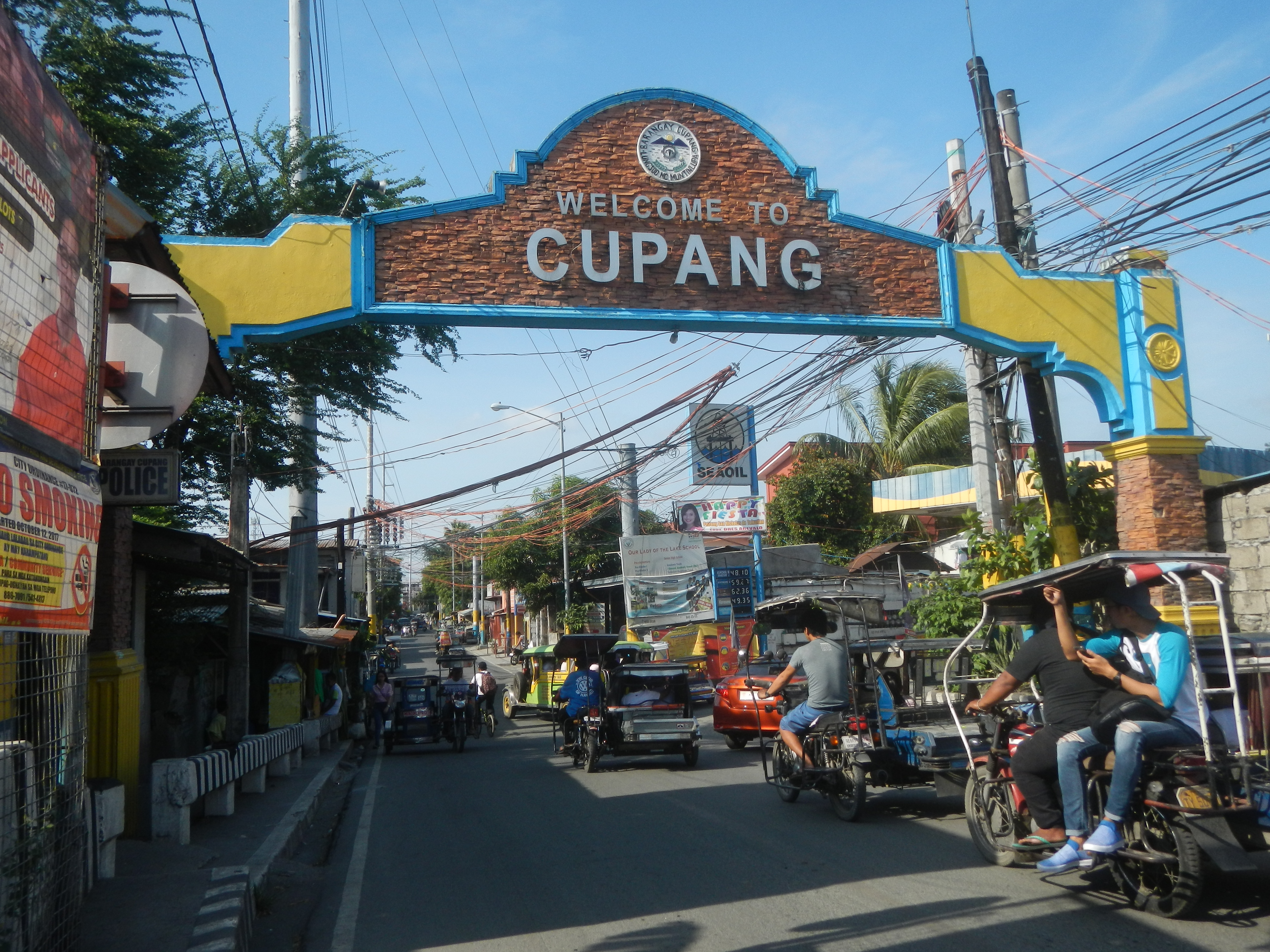
- Cupang welcome arch at Manuel L. Quezon Street
- Interactive map of Cupang
- Coordinates: 14°25′53.4″N 121°2′55″E
- Country: Philippines
- Region: National Capital Region
- City: Muntinlupa
- District: 2nd Legislative district of Muntinlupa

Government
  - Type: Barangay
  - Barangay Captain: Luvi Constantino

Area
  - Total: 5.370 km^{2} (2.073 sq mi)

Population (2020)
  - Total: 57,196
  - Density: 10,650/km^{2} (27,590/sq mi)
- Time zone: UTC+8 (PST)
- Postal Code: 1771
- Area code: 02
- Range: Marikina Valley Fault Ridge

Cupang is a barangay in Muntinlupa, Metro Manila, Philippines. The total land area of the barangay is 5.370 km^{2} (2.073 sq mi). It has a population of 57,196 as of the 2020 census. It is located in the northern section of the city.

Cupang is located south of the City of Manila. It is bounded on the north by the Muntinlupa barangay of Buli, on the south by the Muntinlupa barangays of Alabang and Ayala Alabang, on the west by the Parañaque barangay of BF Homes and the Las Piñas barangay of Almanza Uno, and on the east by Laguna de Bay.

== Etymology ==
Cupang is said to be named after the cupang tree abundant in the area. Parkia javanica, or Cupang, is a plant of the genus Parkia in the family Mimosaceae. It was also alternatively spelled as Kupang, apparently stylized in Tagalog.

== Demographics ==
Year	Population
2007	63,149
2010	57,013
2015	58,331
2020	57,196
2024	57,482

== Subdivisions ==
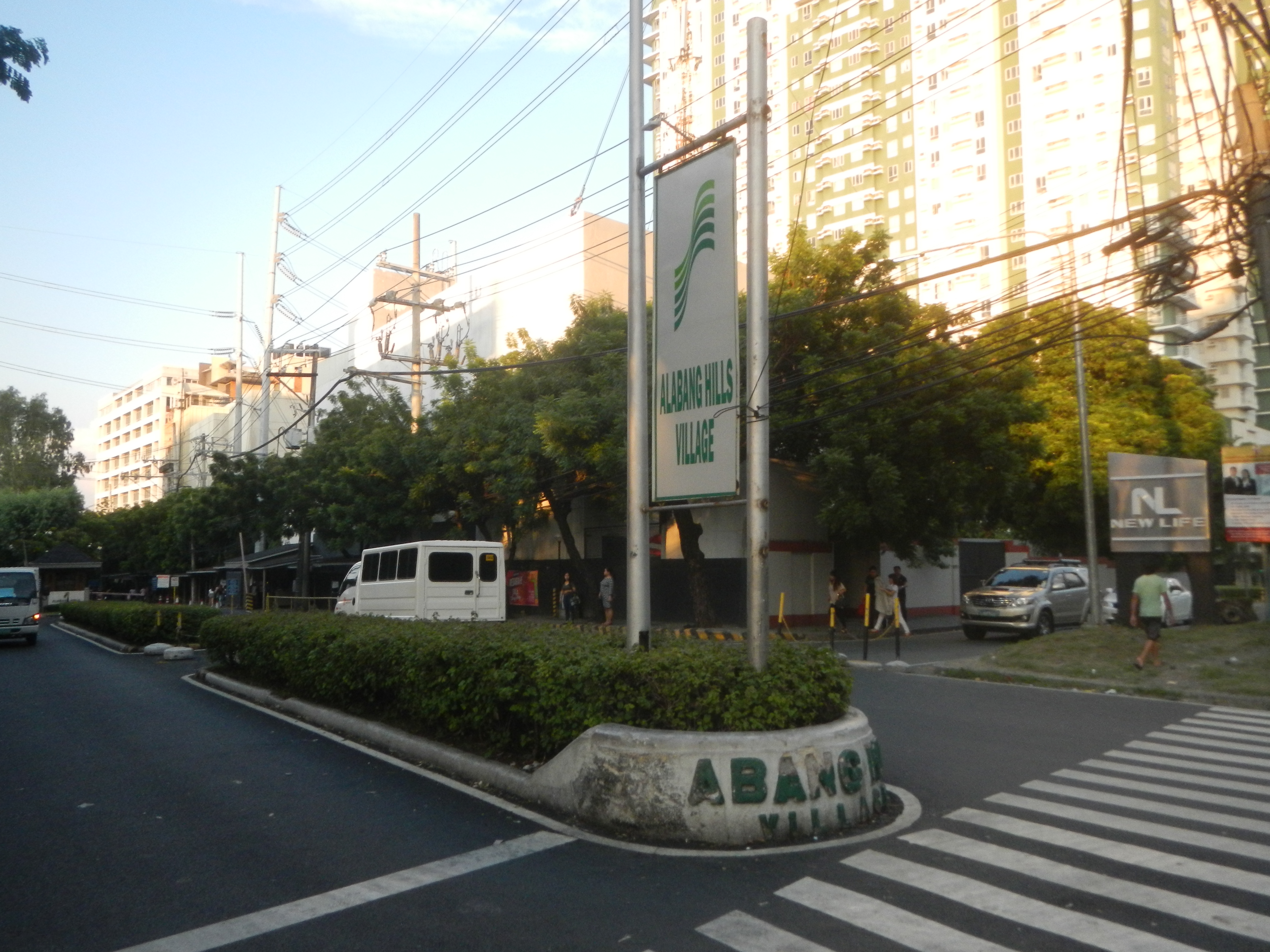
Alabang Hills Village

While barangays are the administrative divisions of the city and are legally part of the addresses of establishments and homes, residents also include their subdivision. Listed below are the subdivisions in this barangay.

- Alabang 400
- Alabang Hills
- B.F. Homes Phase 4
- Capri Homes
- Embassy Village
- Hillsborough Homes
- Intercity Homes Subdivision
- Kalipayan Homes
- Liberty Homes
- Mintcor South Row Townhomes
- Pacific Village
- Pacific Malayan
- San Jose Subdivision
- Tierra Nueva Village
- Villa Donata

== Education ==
The Department of Education (DepEd) is responsible for basic education in the Philippines. The Commission on Higher Education (CHED) is responsible for Higher Education in the Philippines.

Schools located in the barangay are as follows:

- Cupang Elementary School
- Our Lady of the Lake School
- PAREF Ridgefield School
- PAREF Southridge School
- Saint Bernadette College of Alabang
- San Beda College Alabang
- Kennedy International School of Business and Languages
- Cupang Senior High School

== See also ==
- Sucat River
- Mangangate River
