= Valenzuela's 1st congressional district =

Legislative district of the Philippines

- Constituency for the House of Representatives of the Philippines
- Boundary of Valenzuela's 1st congressional district in Valenzuela
- Location of Valenzuela within Metro Manila
- City: Valenzuela
- Region: Metro Manila
- Population: 360,894 (2020)
- Electorate: 210,330 (2025)
- Major settlements: 24 barangays: Arkong Bato; Balangkas; Bignay; Bisig; Canumay East; Canumay West; Coloong; Dalandanan; Isla; Lawang Bato; Lingunan; Mabolo; Malanday; Malinta; Palasan; Pariancillo Villa; Pasolo; Poblacion; Polo; Punturin; Rincon; Tagalag; Veinte Reales; Wawang Pulo
- Area: 25.82 km^{2} (9.97 sq mi)

Current constituency
- Created: 1998
- Representative: Kenneth Gatchalian
- Political party: NPC
- Congressional bloc: Majority

Valenzuela's 1st congressional district is one of the two congressional districts of the Philippines in the city of Valenzuela. It has been represented in the House of Representatives of the Philippines since 2001. The district was created following Valenzuela's conversion into a highly urbanised city through Republic Act No. 8526 on February 14, 1998. It consists of 24 barangays in the northern part of the city, namely Arkong Bato, Balangkas, Bignay, Bisig, Canumay East, Canumay West, Coloong, Dalandanan, Isla, Lawang Bato, Lingunan, Mabolo, Malanday, Malinta, Palasan, Pariancillo Villa, Pasolo, Poblacion, Polo, Punturin, Rincon, Tagalag, Veinte Reales, and Wawang Pulo. It is currently represented in the 20th Congress by Kenneth Gatchalian of the Nationalist People's Coalition (NPC).

== Representation history ==
#	Image	Member	Term of office		Congress	Party	Electoral history	Constituent LGUs
#	Image	Member	Start	End	Congress	Party	Electoral history	Constituent LGUs
=== Valenzuela's 1st district for the House of Representatives of the Philippines ===
District created February 14, 1998 from Valenzuela's at-large district.
1		Win Gatchalian	June 30, 2001	June 30, 2004	12th	NPC	Elected in 2001.	2001–2013; Arkong Bato, Balangkas, Bignay, Bisig, Canumay, Coloong, Dalandanan, Isla, Lawang Bato, Lingunan, Mabolo, Malanday, Malinta, Palasan, Pariancillo Villa, Pasolo, Poblacion, Polo, Punturin, Rincon, Tagalag, Veinte Reales, Wawang Pulo
2		Bobbit Carlos	June 30, 2004	June 30, 2007	13th	Lakas	Elected in 2004.	2001–2013; Arkong Bato, Balangkas, Bignay, Bisig, Canumay, Coloong, Dalandanan, Isla, Lawang Bato, Lingunan, Mabolo, Malanday, Malinta, Palasan, Pariancillo Villa, Pasolo, Poblacion, Polo, Punturin, Rincon, Tagalag, Veinte Reales, Wawang Pulo
3		Rex Gatchalian	June 30, 2007	June 30, 2013	14th	NPC	Elected in 2007.	2001–2013; Arkong Bato, Balangkas, Bignay, Bisig, Canumay, Coloong, Dalandanan, Isla, Lawang Bato, Lingunan, Mabolo, Malanday, Malinta, Palasan, Pariancillo Villa, Pasolo, Poblacion, Polo, Punturin, Rincon, Tagalag, Veinte Reales, Wawang Pulo
3		Rex Gatchalian	June 30, 2007	June 30, 2013	15th	NPC	Re-elected in 2010.	2001–2013; Arkong Bato, Balangkas, Bignay, Bisig, Canumay, Coloong, Dalandanan, Isla, Lawang Bato, Lingunan, Mabolo, Malanday, Malinta, Palasan, Pariancillo Villa, Pasolo, Poblacion, Polo, Punturin, Rincon, Tagalag, Veinte Reales, Wawang Pulo
(1)		Win Gatchalian	June 30, 2013	June 30, 2016	16th	NPC	Elected in 2013.	2013–present Arkong Bato, Balangkas, Bignay, Bisig, Canumay East, Canumay West, Coloong, Dalandanan, Isla, Lawang Bato, Lingunan, Mabolo, Malanday, Malinta, Palasan, Pariancillo Villa, Pasolo, Poblacion, Polo, Punturin, Rincon, Tagalag, Veinte Reales, Wawang Pulo
4		Weslie Gatchalian	June 30, 2016	June 30, 2022	17th	NPC	Elected in 2016.	2013–present Arkong Bato, Balangkas, Bignay, Bisig, Canumay East, Canumay West, Coloong, Dalandanan, Isla, Lawang Bato, Lingunan, Mabolo, Malanday, Malinta, Palasan, Pariancillo Villa, Pasolo, Poblacion, Polo, Punturin, Rincon, Tagalag, Veinte Reales, Wawang Pulo
4		Weslie Gatchalian	June 30, 2016	June 30, 2022	18th	NPC	Re-elected in 2019.	2013–present Arkong Bato, Balangkas, Bignay, Bisig, Canumay East, Canumay West, Coloong, Dalandanan, Isla, Lawang Bato, Lingunan, Mabolo, Malanday, Malinta, Palasan, Pariancillo Villa, Pasolo, Poblacion, Polo, Punturin, Rincon, Tagalag, Veinte Reales, Wawang Pulo
(3)		Rex Gatchalian	June 30, 2022	January 31, 2023	19th	NPC	Elected in 2022. Resigned on appointment as Secretary of Social Welfare and Development.	2013–present Arkong Bato, Balangkas, Bignay, Bisig, Canumay East, Canumay West, Coloong, Dalandanan, Isla, Lawang Bato, Lingunan, Mabolo, Malanday, Malinta, Palasan, Pariancillo Villa, Pasolo, Poblacion, Polo, Punturin, Rincon, Tagalag, Veinte Reales, Wawang Pulo
5		Kenneth Gatchalian	June 30, 2025	Incumbent	20th	NPC	Elected in 2025.	2013–present Arkong Bato, Balangkas, Bignay, Bisig, Canumay East, Canumay West, Coloong, Dalandanan, Isla, Lawang Bato, Lingunan, Mabolo, Malanday, Malinta, Palasan, Pariancillo Villa, Pasolo, Poblacion, Polo, Punturin, Rincon, Tagalag, Veinte Reales, Wawang Pulo

== Election results ==
=== 2025 ===
2025 Valenzuela 1st District Representative election result
Candidate	Party	Votes	%
Kenneth Gatchalian	Nationalist People's Coalition	80,410	49.45
Tony Espiritu	Aksyon Demokratiko	79,629	48.96
Jing Hernandez	Independent	2,586	1.59
Total		162,625	100.00
Valid votes		210,330	95.99
Invalid/blank votes		8,784	4.01
Total votes		219,114	100.00
Nationalist People's Coalition hold			
Source: COMELEC

=== 2022 ===
Incumbent representative is Wes Gatchalian.

Philippine House of Representatives election in the 1st District of Valenzuela
Party	Candidate	Votes	%
NPC	Rexlon T. Gatchalian	141,794	100%
Total votes		141,794	100%
NPC hold			

=== 2019 ===
2019 Philippine House of Representatives election in the 1st District of Valenzuela
Party	Candidate	Votes	%
NPC	Wes Gatchalian	119,372	100.0
Valid ballots		144,783	96.8
Invalid or blank votes		4,820	3.2
Total votes		149,603	100.0
NPC hold			

=== 2016 ===
2016 Valenzuela congressional First District election
Party	Candidate	Votes	%
NPC	Wes Gatchalian	'92,541'	'74.26'
Liberal	Ritche D. Cuadra	22,246	17.85
PBM	Victor Reponia	336	0.27
Invalid or blank votes		9,491	7.62
Total votes		124,614	100.00
NPC hold			

=== 2013 ===
2013 Philippine House of Representatives election at Valenzuela's 1st district
Party	Candidate	Votes	%
NPC	Sherwin Gatchalian	67,992	70.05
Lakas	Ritche Cuadra	23,805	24.53
Invalid or blank votes		5,265	5.42
Total votes		97,062	100.00
NPC hold			

=== 2010 ===
Philippine House of Representatives election at Valenzuela's 1st district
Party	Candidate	Votes	%
NPC	Rexlon T. Gatchalian	74,977	90.43
Independent	Ma. Elisa D. Mendoza	7,933	9.57
Valid ballots		82,910	92.94
Total votes		89,208	100.00
NPC hold			

=== 2007 ===
2007 Philippine House of Representatives election at Valenzuela's First district
Party	Candidate	Votes	%
NPC	Rexlon "Rex" T. Gatchalian	36,251	
Lakas	Eddie Lozada		
Independent	Danilo Espiritu		
Invalid or blank votes			
Total votes			
NPC gain from Lakas			

== See also ==
- Legislative districts of Valenzuela
