= Lingunan =

Barangay in Valenzuela City, Philippines

- Barangay
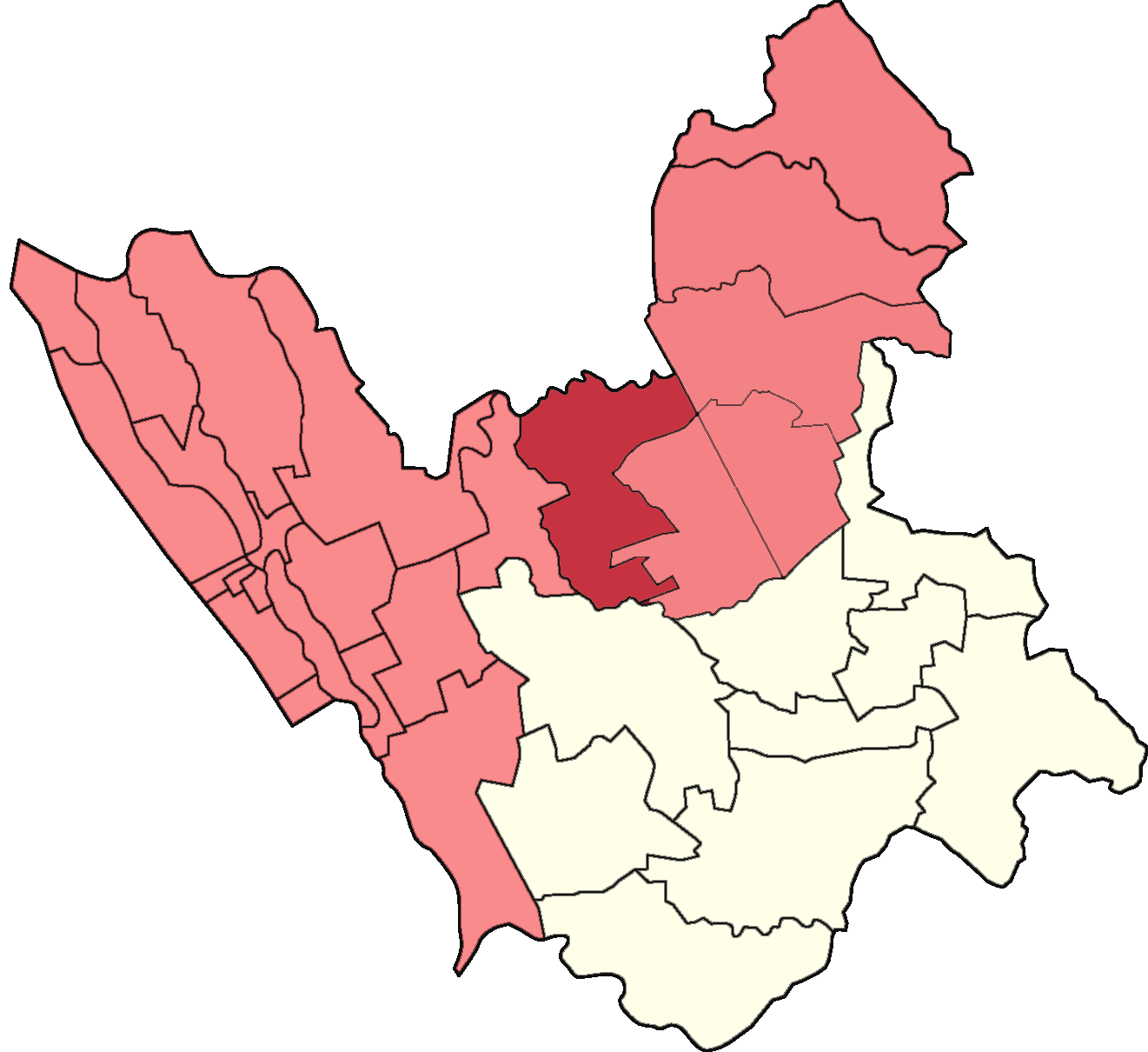
- Lingunan (red) with its first congressional co-barangays (light red) in Valenzuela

- Lingunan (Luzon) Lingunan (Philippines)
- Coordinates: 14°43′7″N 120°58′34″E

Government
  - Barangay Captain: Jose Trinidad Cabral
  - Sangguniang Kabataan Chairperson: Caryl Anne Ramos Race

Area
  - Total: 1.59 km^{2} (0.61 sq mi)
- Elevation: 10 m (33 ft)
- Highest elevation: 33 m (108 ft)
- Lowest elevation: −3 m (−9.8 ft)

Population (2020)
  - Total: 24,088
  - Density: 15,100/km^{2} (39,200/sq mi)
- Time zone: UTC+8 (PST)
- Postal code: 1446
- Area code: 02

Lingunan is a landlocked 1st congressional district urban barangay in Valenzuela City, Philippines. It borders the barangays Viente Reales to the west, Canumay West to the east, Lawang Bato to the north-east and the city of Meycauayan which its barangays Lawa and Caingin borders it to the north. Based on the 2020 census, it has a population of 24,088.

== Etymology ==
The name of the barangay came from a folklore of which a little girl whose name is "Lingap" living in a barrio. Later on, Spaniards arrived to conquer the barrio and people started to left. When Lingap's family is trying to leave, they forgot the pillow with jewelries inside of it. They were spotted by Spaniards. Lingap's dad shouted, "Lingap, ang unan!" The Spaniards misheard it as "lingunan" and ask them in Spanish, but they didn't understand the Spaniards and are afraid of them so they left. The conquered barrio is now named by Spaniards as "Lingunan".

== History ==
During the Spanish and American occupation, the place was a thriving agricultural area.

== Geography ==
Lingunan is located about 14 kilometers north of Manila in the coordinates 14°43′7″N 120°58′34″E.

It has an enclosed creek named Lingunan Creek, which in 2021 is the most improved estero by Department of Environment and Natural Resources (DENR) in Metro Manila. Its surrounding rivers are found on its border with Bulacan and on its border with Barangay Viente Reales.

=== Climate ===
The Köppen-Geiger climate classification of Lingunan is Tropical Monsoon (Am) which has less pronounce dry seasons or extraordinary rainy wet seasons and pronounce dry seasons.

== Population ==
Lingunan
Year	Pop.	±%
1990	6,884	—
1995	12,040	+74.9%
2000	11,875	−1.4%
2007	14,661	+23.5%
2010	17,436	+18.9%
2015	21,217	+21.7%
2020	24,088	+13.5%
Source: Philippine Statistics Authority
