= Palasan =

Palasan may refer to the following:

- Palasan, Valenzuela, barangay of the Philippines
- Palasan, barangay of the Philippines in the municipality of Burdeos
  - Palasan Island, main island of the Palasan barangay in Burdeos
- Palasan, village in the Indian state of West Bengal
- Palasan, village in the Indian state of Gujarat
- Pălășan, Romanian family name
