= Polo, Valenzuela =

Barangay in Valenzuela City, Metro Manila, Philippines

Polo Pulo
- Barangay
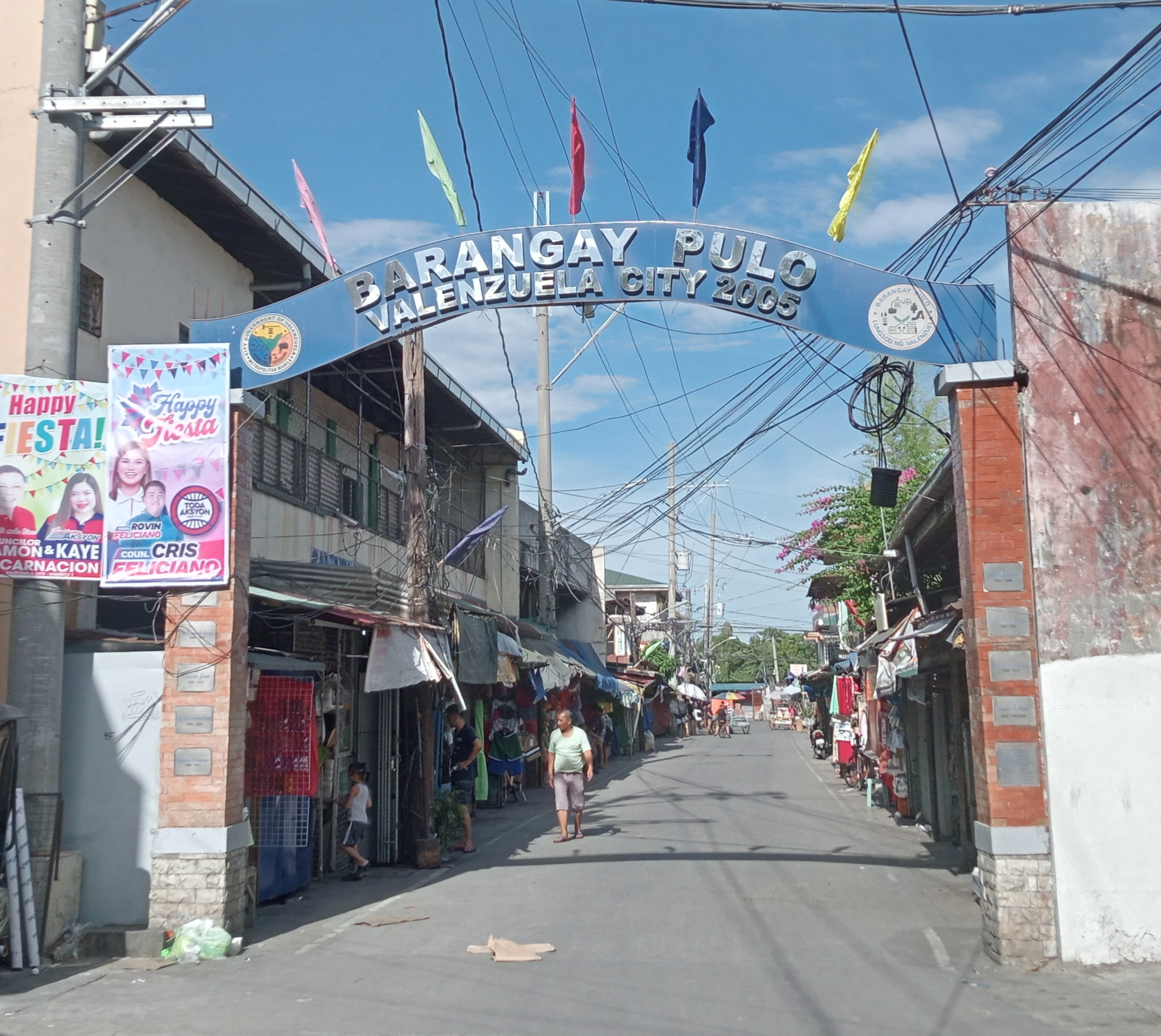
- Welcome arch

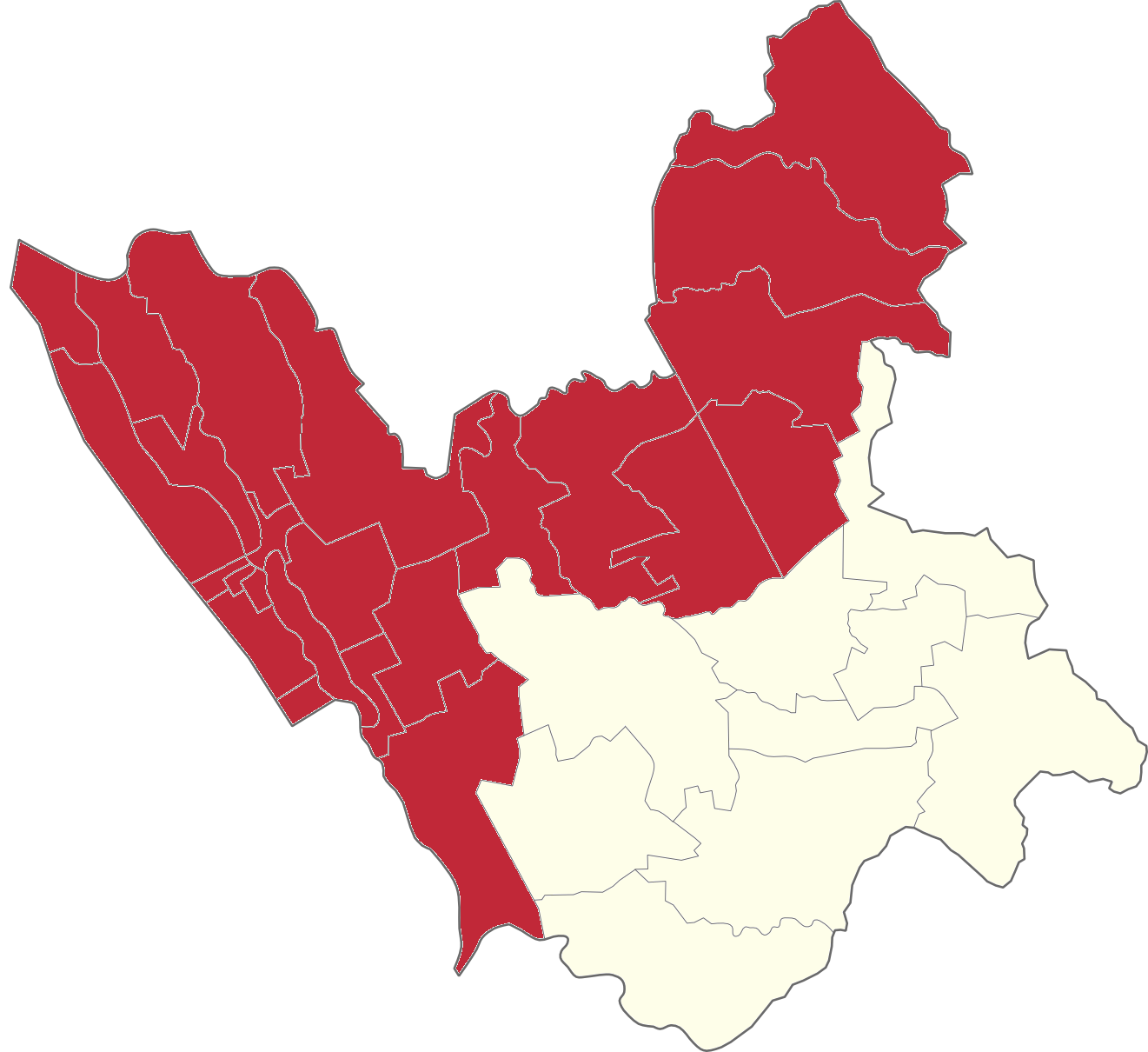
- Location of Polo in the 1st Valenzuela legislative district
- Coordinates: 14°42′29″N 120°56′46″E
- Country: Philippines
- Region: National Capital Region
- City: Valenzuela
- Congressional districts: Part of the 1st district of Valenzuela

Government
  - Barangay Chairman: Bernadette De Guzman San Jose

Area
  - Total: 0.052 km^{2} (0.020 sq mi)

Population (2007)
  - Total: 1,001
  - Density: 19,000/km^{2} (50,000/sq mi)
- ZIP code: 1444
- Area code: 2

Polo or Pulo is a barangay and former municipality within the city of Valenzuela, Philippines. It is located in the northern part of Valenzuela, and was an independent municipality from 1623 to 1963.

The barangay experiences extreme flood during rainy seasons.

== Festivals ==
Residents celebrate its fiesta every Easter Sunday.

== Landmarks ==
Landmarks in Polo include Pulo Barangay Hall and the Pulo Public Market. While named after the old town of Polo, San Miguel Brewery Inc. - Polo Brewery is not located in Barangay Polo and is in Barangay Marulas of the same city.
