= Wellex Industries =

Filipino mining and oil exploration company

Wellex Industries, Inc.
- Type: Public
- Traded as: PSE: WIN
- Industry: Mining; Oil exploration
- Founded: October 19, 1956; 69 years ago
- Headquarters: One Corporate Centre, Ortigas Center, Pasig
- Area served: Philippines
- Key people: Peter Salud (Chairman); Kenneth T. Gatchalian (President)
- Parent: The Wellex Group
- Website: www.wellexindustries.com

Wellex Industries, Inc. is a Filipino company engaged in mining and oil exploration in the Philippines. Currently headquartered in Ortigas Center, Pasig City, it is one of The Wellex Group's six major business segments.

The company was founded in October 1956 as Republic Resources and Development Corporation (also known as REDECO). By the 1980s, the company encountered difficulties in both the oil and mining industries, but was able to recover with the organization of The Wellex Group in 1994. In September 1997, the company changed its name from REDECO to Wellex Industries.

Two subsidiaries of the company, Plastic City Industrial Corporation and Philfoods Asia, Inc., ceased operations in 2002 due to losses, with Philfoods Asia later being sold in 2016.

== History ==
Republic Resources and Development Corporation (REDECO) was founded on October 19, 1956, and was publicly listed in the Philippine Stock Exchange by January 1958.

In mid-1965, Cebu City Mayor Sergio Osmeña Jr. accused then-Senate President Ferdinand Marcos of fraud for allegedly issuing two bouncing checks for ₱153 million each to REDECO in September 1958.

In the 1980s, the company encountered difficulties in both the oil and mining industries, but was later able to recover with the organization of The Wellex Group by William Gatchalian in 1994. In September 1997, the company changed its name from REDECO to Wellex Industries. Plastic City Industrial Corporation (PCIC) joined The Wellex Group in November 1999, becoming a subsidiary of Wellex Industries. However, PCIC as well as another subsidiary, Philfoods Asia, Inc., eventually ceased operations by 2002 due to losses, with the latter being sold off in early 2016.
