= Legislative districts of Valenzuela =

Legislative district of the Philippines

The legislative districts of Valenzuela are the representations of the highly urbanized city of Valenzuela in the various national legislatures of the Philippines. The city is currently represented in the lower house of the Congress of the Philippines through its first and second districts.

== History ==
Valenzuela, originally known as Polo until 1963, was represented as part of the at-large district of Bulacan in the Malolos Congress (1898–1899) and the National Assembly of the Second Philippine Republic (1943–1944) and the second district of Bulacan from 1907 to 1941 and from 1945 to 1972. It was separated from Bulacan on November 7, 1975, by virtue of Presidential Decree No. 824, and was represented in the Interim Batasang Pambansa along with other Metropolitan Manila municipalities and cities as part of Region IV from 1978 to 1984. Valenzuela was grouped together with Navotas and Malabon as the legislative district of Malabon–Navotas–Valenzuela for representation in the Regular Batasang Pambansa from 1984 to 1986. From 1987 to 2001, Valenzuela had its own representation in the House of Representatives and was divided into two districts after its city charter (Republic Act No. 8526) was approved on February 14, 1998, and ratified on December 30, 1998.

== Current districts ==
Legislative Districts and Congressional Representatives of Valenzuela City
| District | Current Representative | Party | Barangays | Population (2020) | Area | Map |
|---|---|---|---|---|---|---|
| 1st | Kenneth Gatchalian (since 2025); Canumay West | NPC | List: Arkong Bato; Balangkas; Bignay; Bisig; Canumay East; Canumay West; Coloong; Dalandanan; Isla; Lawang Bato; Lingunan; Mabolo; Malanday; Malinta; Palasan; Pariancillo Villa; Pasolo; Poblacion; Pulo; Punturin; Rincon; Tagalag; Veinte Reales; Wawang Pulo | 360,439 | 25.82 km^{2} | |
| 2nd | Gerald Galang (since 2025); Marulas | Lakas-CMD | List: Bagbaguin; Karuhatan; General T. De Leon; Mapulang Lupa; Marulas; Maysan; Parada; Paso de Blas; Ugong | 354,539 | 18.69 km^{2} | |
