= Bisig, Valenzuela =

Barangay in Valenzuela City, Metro Manila, Philippines

Bisig
- Barangay
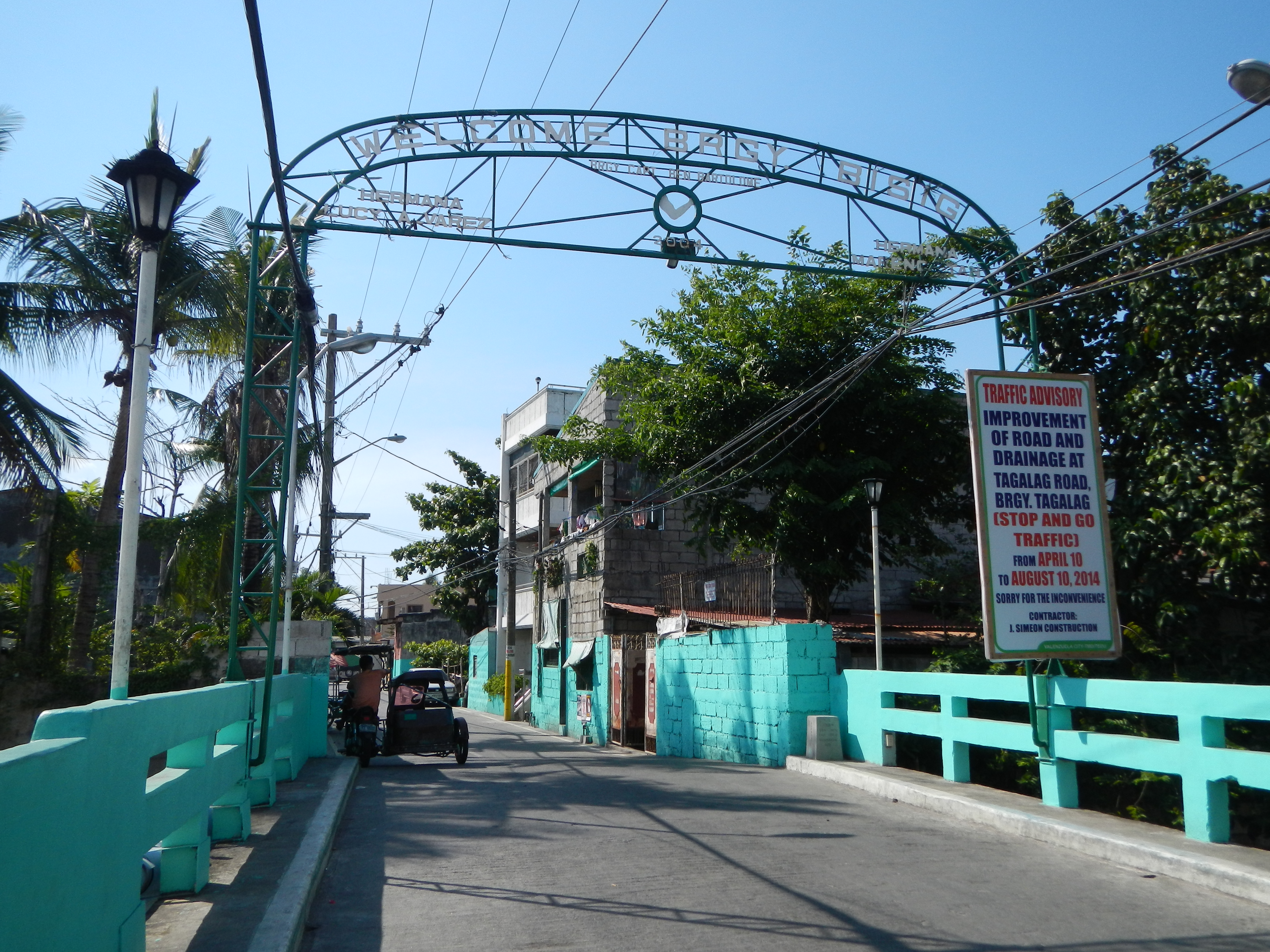
- Welcome Arch to Bisig
- Interactive map of Bisig
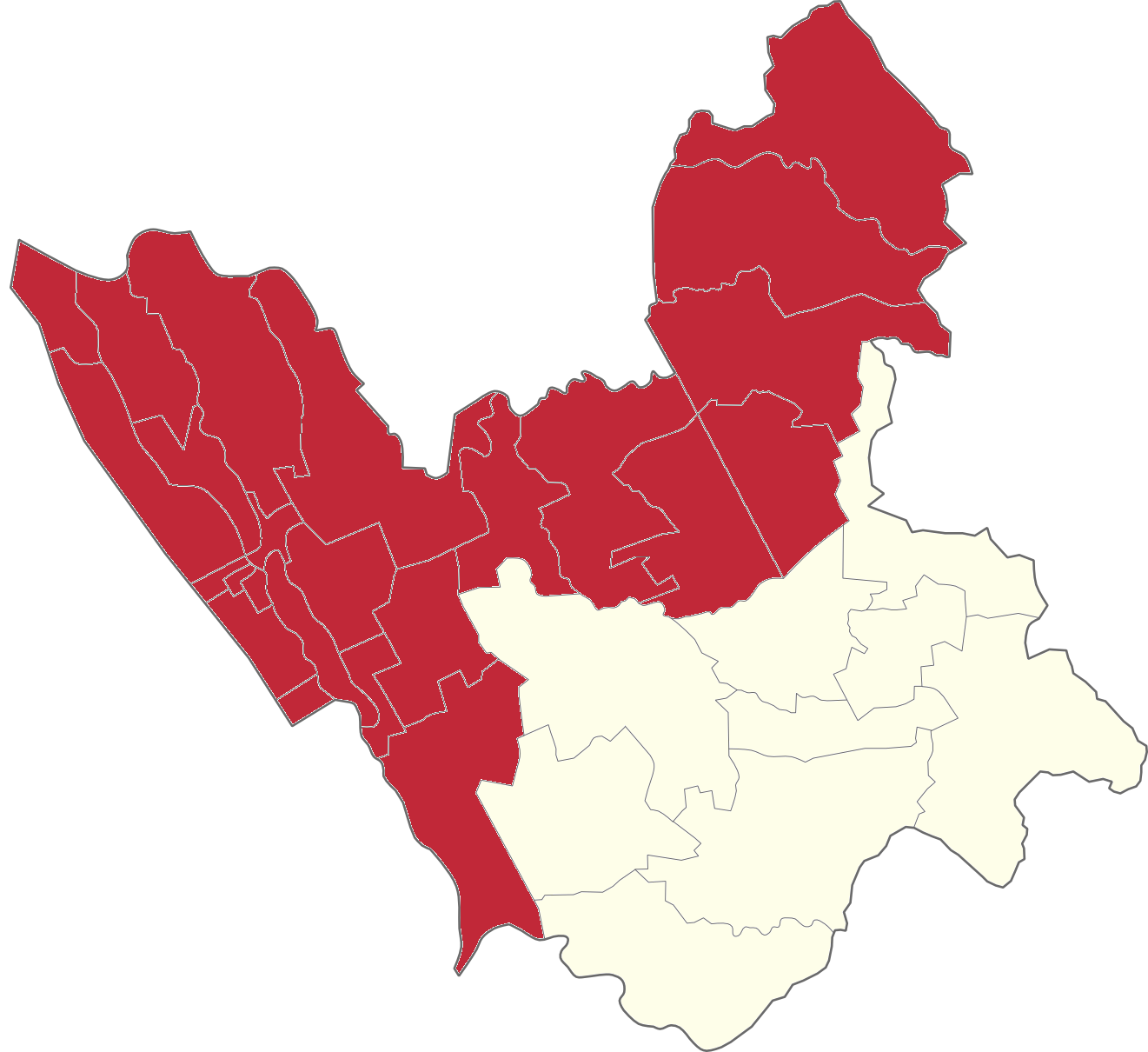
- Location of Bisig in the 1st Valenzuela legislative district
- Coordinates: 14°43′00″N 120°56′34″E
- Country: Philippines
- Region: National Capital Region
- City: Valenzuela
- Congressional districts: Part of the 1st district of Valenzuela

Government
  - Barangay Chairman: Michelle Bartolome

Area
  - Total: 0.4560 km^{2} (0.1761 sq mi)

Population (2020)
  - Total: 1,432
  - Density: 3,140/km^{2} (8,133/sq mi)
- ZIP code: 1445
- Area code: 2

Bisig is one of the constituent barangays in the city of Valenzuela, Metro Manila, Philippines. The name "Bisig" came from an organization in the area several decades ago. Formerly named Buli.

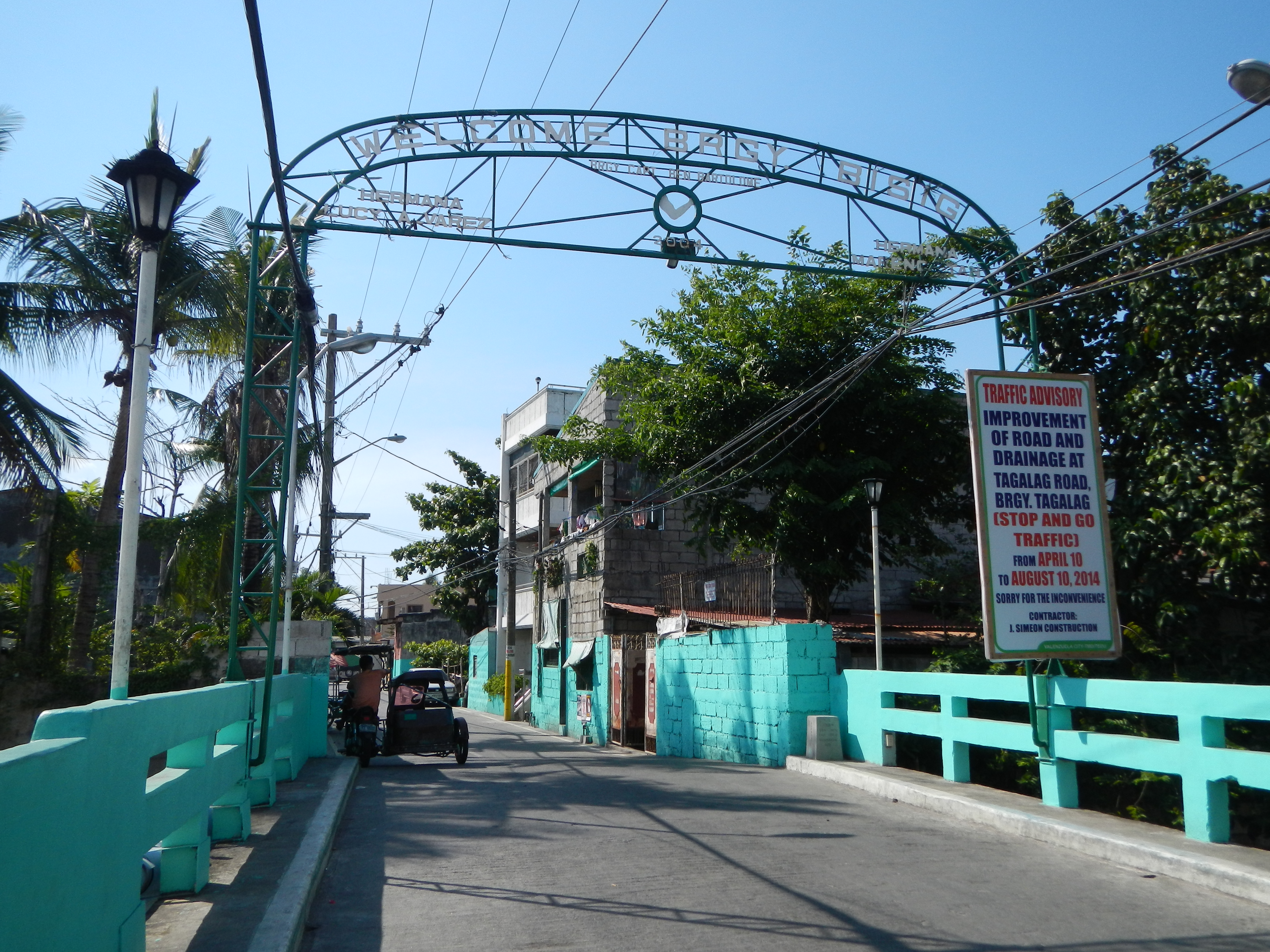
Welcome arch

== Festivals ==
Residents and citizens celebrate the fiesta of Sta. Cruz, their patron saint, every last Saturday of April.

== Landmarks ==
Landmarks in Bisig includes Bisig Multipurpose Court, Tanod Building, Bisig Chapel, Bisig Day Care and Bisig Barangay.
