= Lawang Bato =

Barangay in Valenzuela City, Metro Manila, Philippines

- Barangay
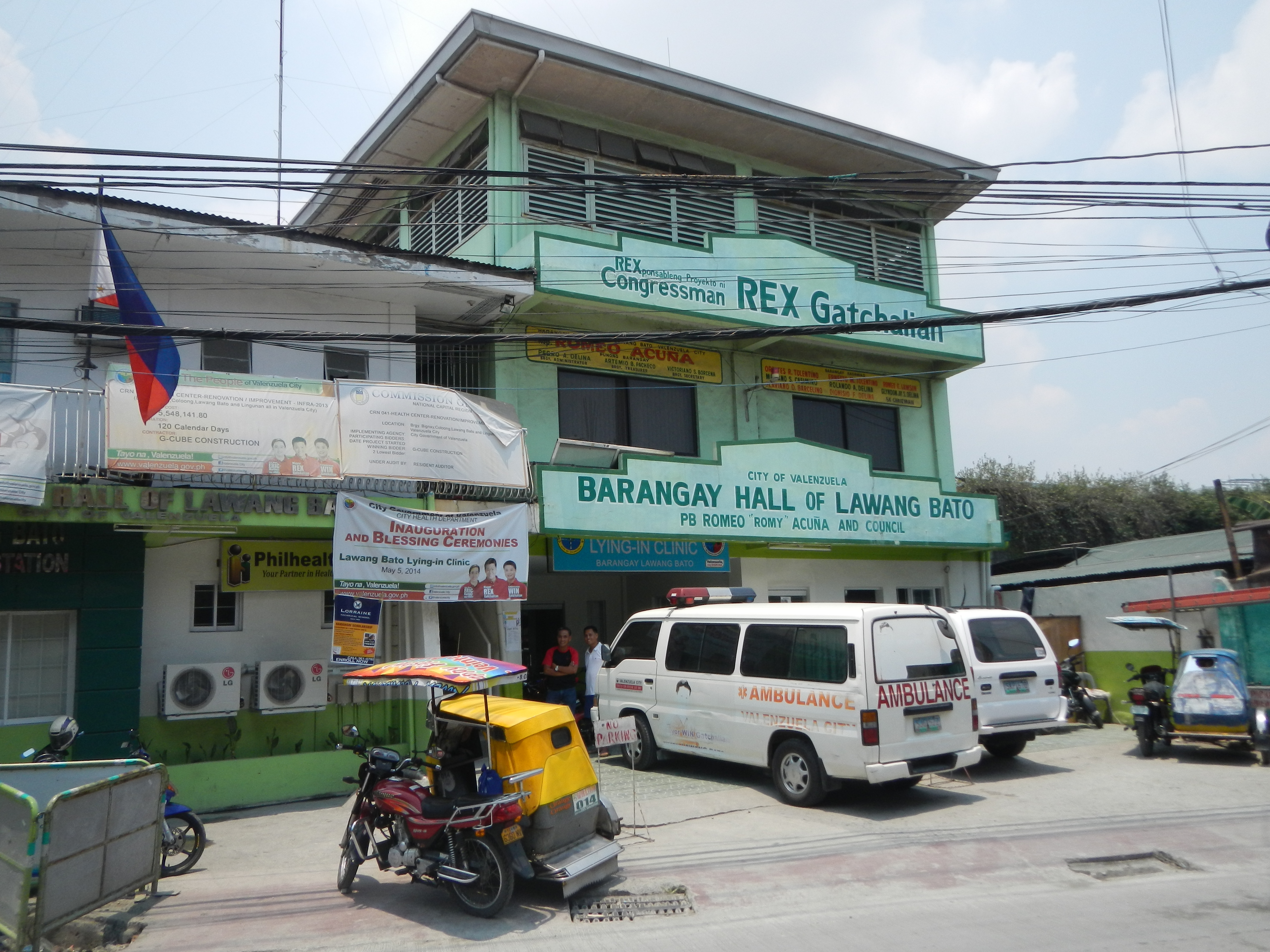
- Lawang Bato Barangay Hall
- Interactive map of Lawang Bato
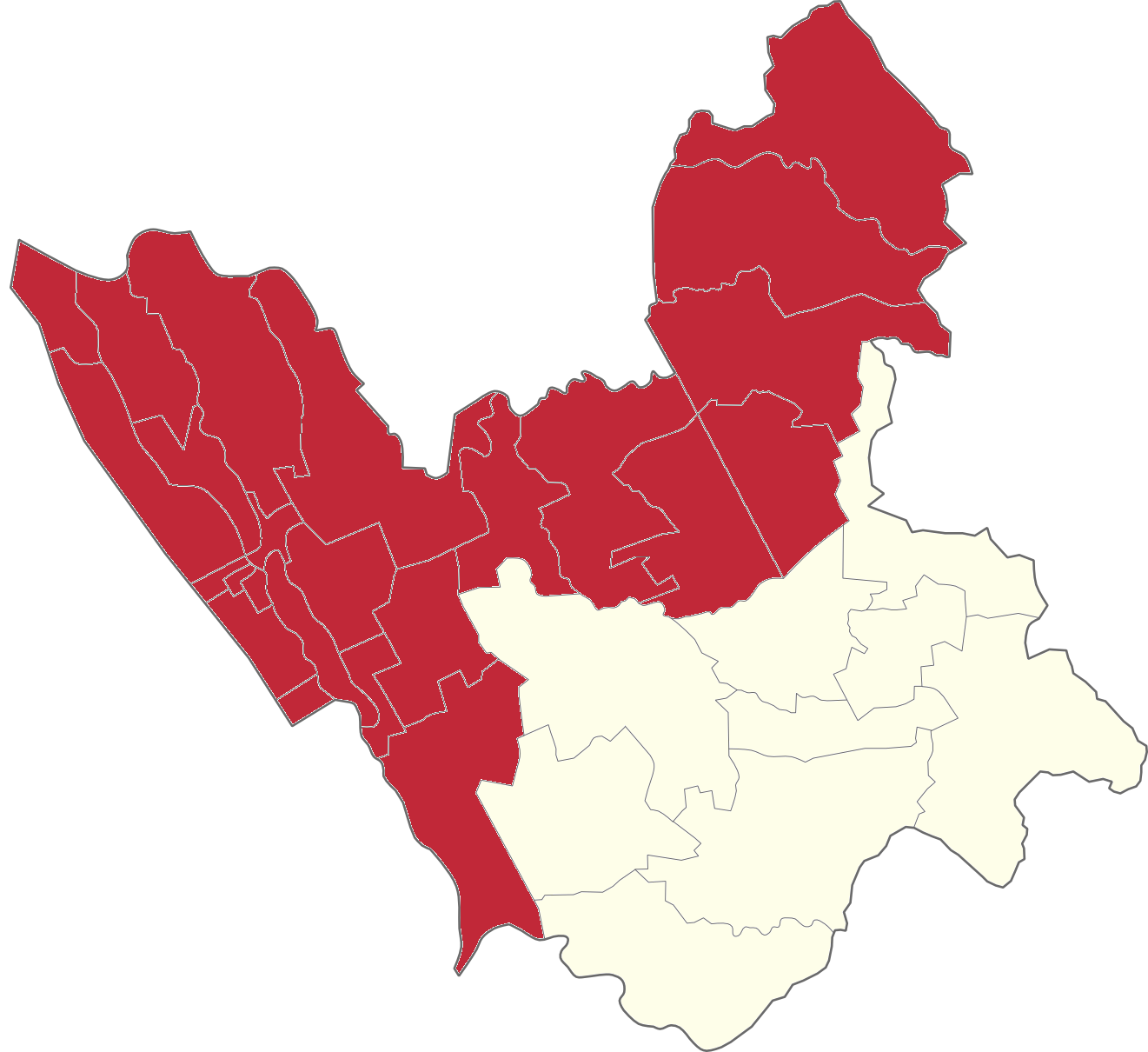
- Location of Lawang Bato in the 1st Valenzuela legislative district
- Coordinates: 14°43′48″N 120°59′46″E
- Country: Philippines
- Region: National Capital Region
- City: Valenzuela
- Congressional districts: Part of the 1st district of Valenzuela

Government
  - Barangay Chairman: Orestes Ramirez Tolentino
  - Sangguniang Kabataan Chairman: Khym Ashley Dulatas

Area
  - Total: 2.875 km^{2} (1.110 sq mi)

Population (2020)
  - Total: 23,786
  - Density: 8,273/km^{2} (21,430/sq mi)
  - Households: 5,064

Lawang Bato (lit. 'Stone Lake') is a barangay in Valenzuela, Metro Manila, Philippines. The name "Lawang Bato" came from the once rocky land where the barangay once stood.

== Demographics ==
Lawang Bato has a population of 23,786 as of the 2020 census and 5,064 households as of the 2015 census.

== Education ==
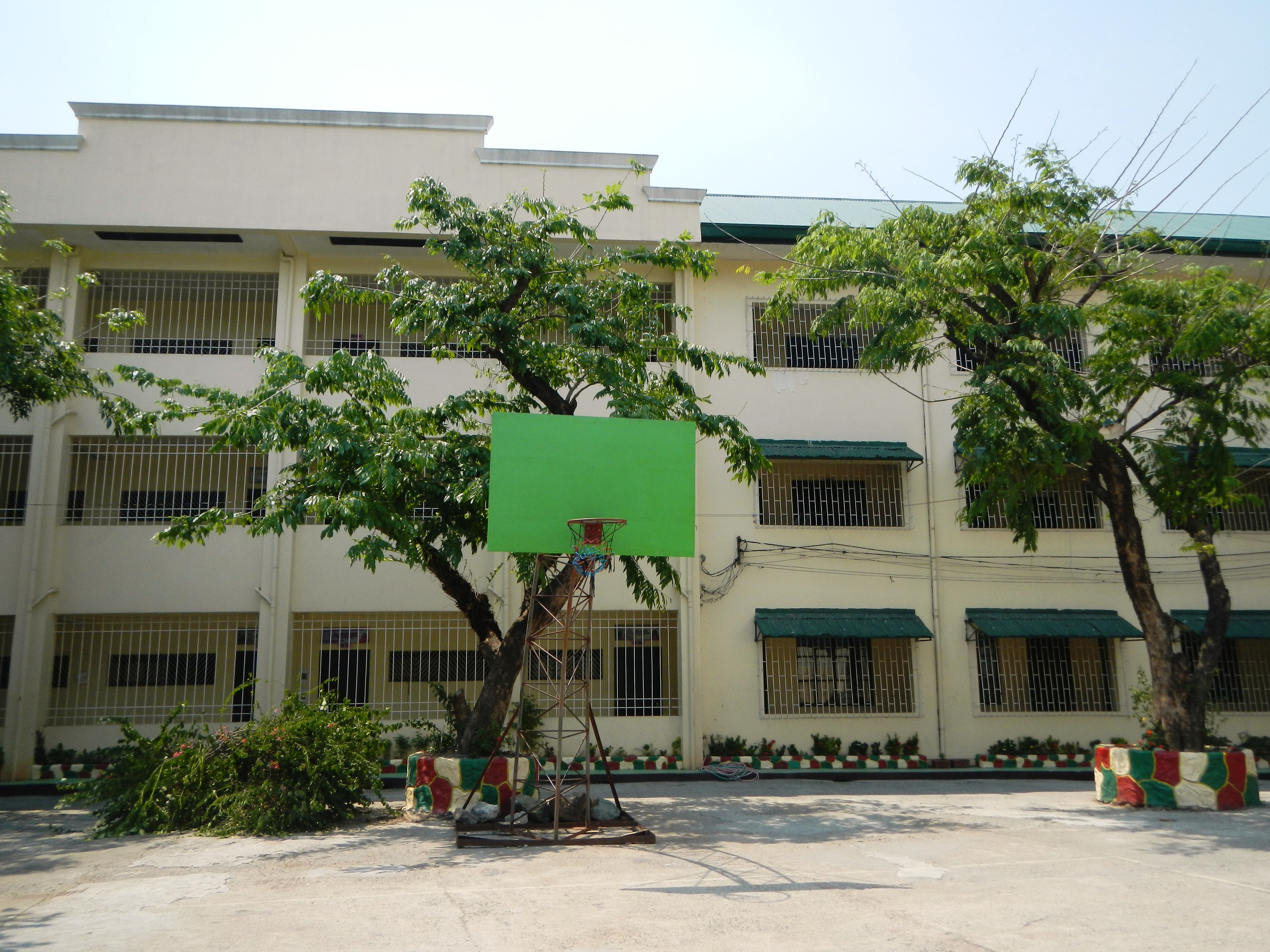
LBNH facade

- Lawang Bato National High School
- Lawang Bato Elementary School
- Charis Christian School of Val. Inc.
- Saint Joseph School of Lawang Bato
