= Isla, Valenzuela =

Barangay in Valenzuela City, Metro Manila, Philippines

Isla
- Barangay
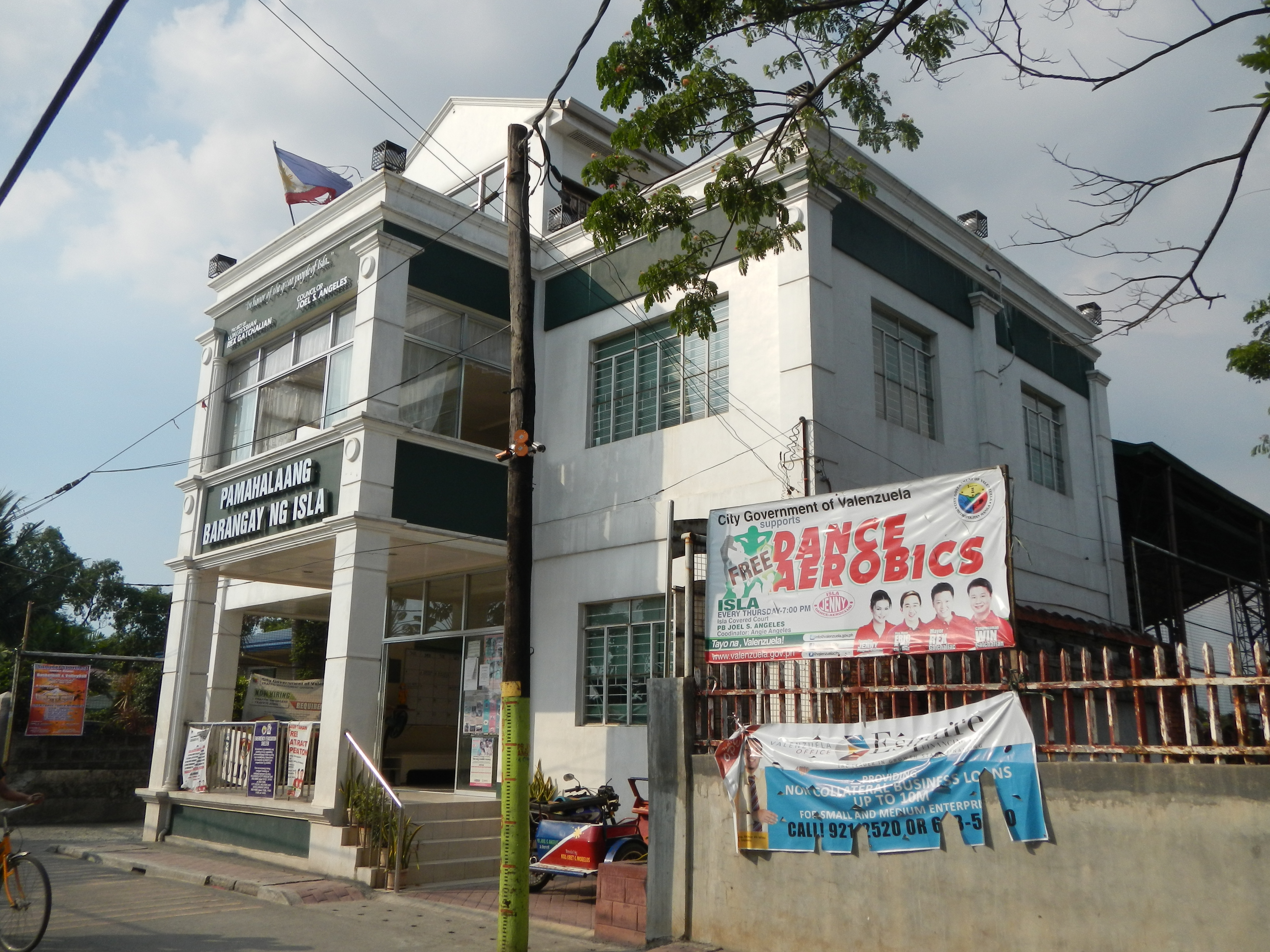
- Isla Barangay Hall
- Interactive map of Isla
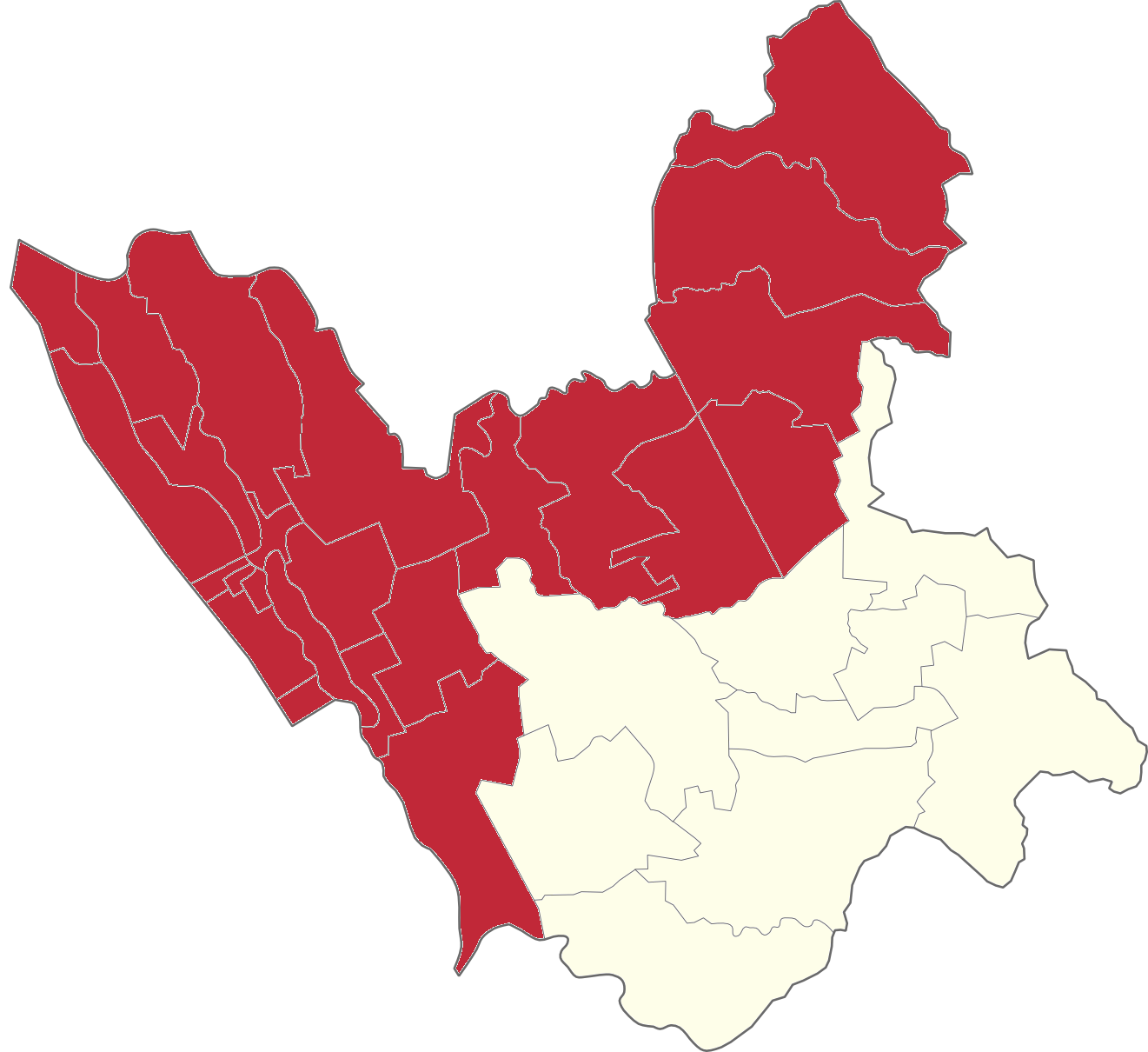
- Location of Isla in the 1st Valenzuela legislative district
- Coordinates: 14°42′14″N 120°57′09″E
- Country: Philippines
- Region: National Capital Region
- City: Valenzuela
- Congressional districts: Part of the 1st district of Valenzuela

Government
  - Barangay Chairman: Roberto G. Morelos (2023)
  - Barangay Councilors: Arnold Morelos, Aram Fajardo, Avelino Alberto Angeles. Jr., Paolo Dizon, Evelyn Lucena Angeles, Ramil Cerda, Edwin San Juan

Area
  - Total: 39.60 km^{2} (15.29 sq mi)

Population (2020)
  - Total: 5,160
  - Density: 130/km^{2} (337/sq mi)
- ZIP code: 1444
- Area code: 2

Isla is one of the constituent barangays in the city of Valenzuela, Metro Manila, Philippines.

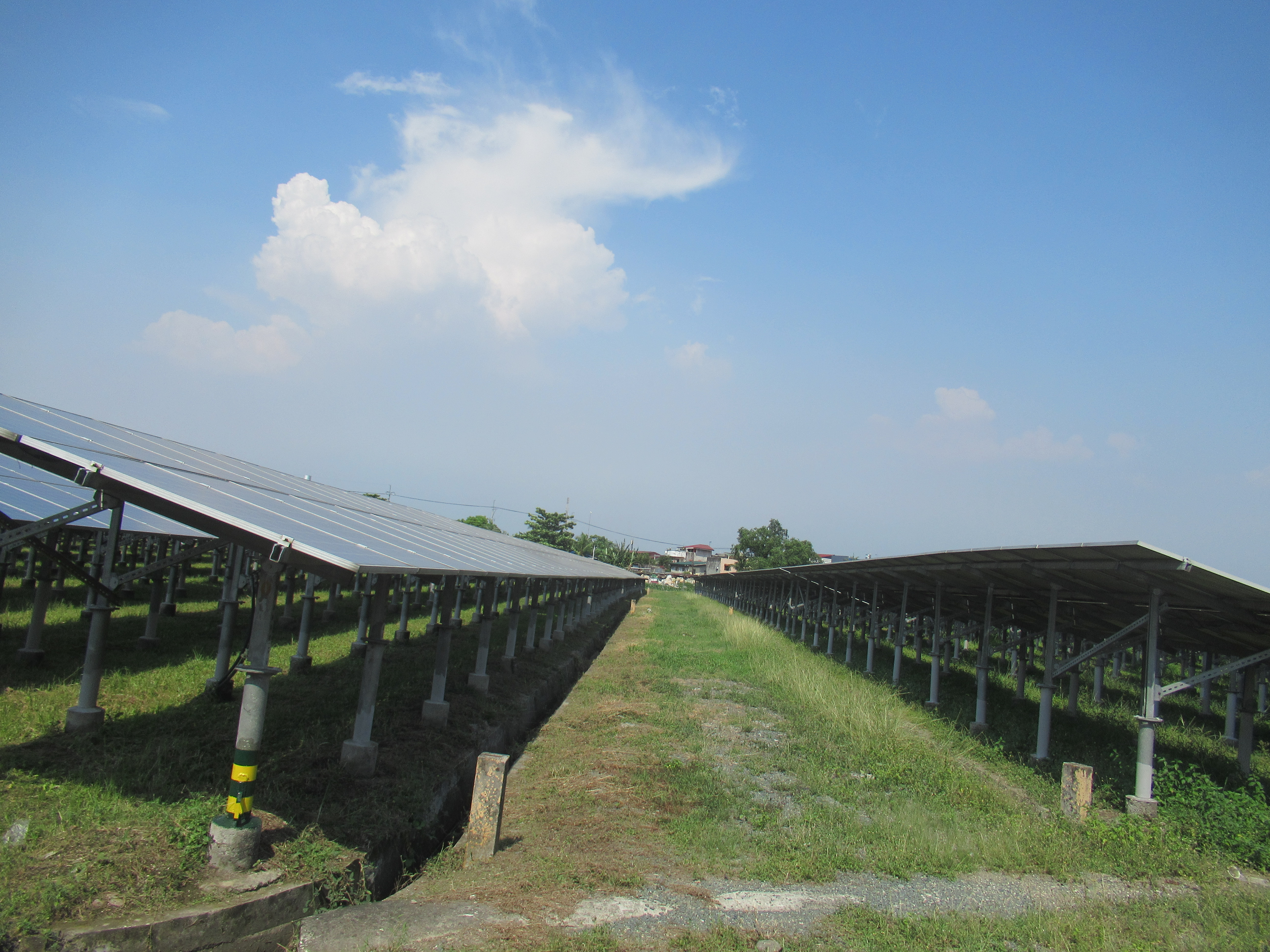
Isla Solar Power Farm

In Filipino, the word "Isla" means "Island". The namesake of Isla came from its natural geography where it is surrounded by rivers and fishery ponds. Nasing Santiago, the youngest mayor of Valenzuela and former governor of Malolos, Bulacan, used to hold residence in Isla.

== Festivals ==
Residents celebrate the fiesta of Sta. Cruz, their patron saint, every last Saturday of April.

== Landmarks ==
Landmarks in Isla include the Sta. Cruz Chapel, Isla Elementary School, the Island Pavilion Resort and Restaurante Pontemar.
