= Pariancillo Villa =

Barangay in Valenzuela City, Metro Manila, Philippines

- Barangay
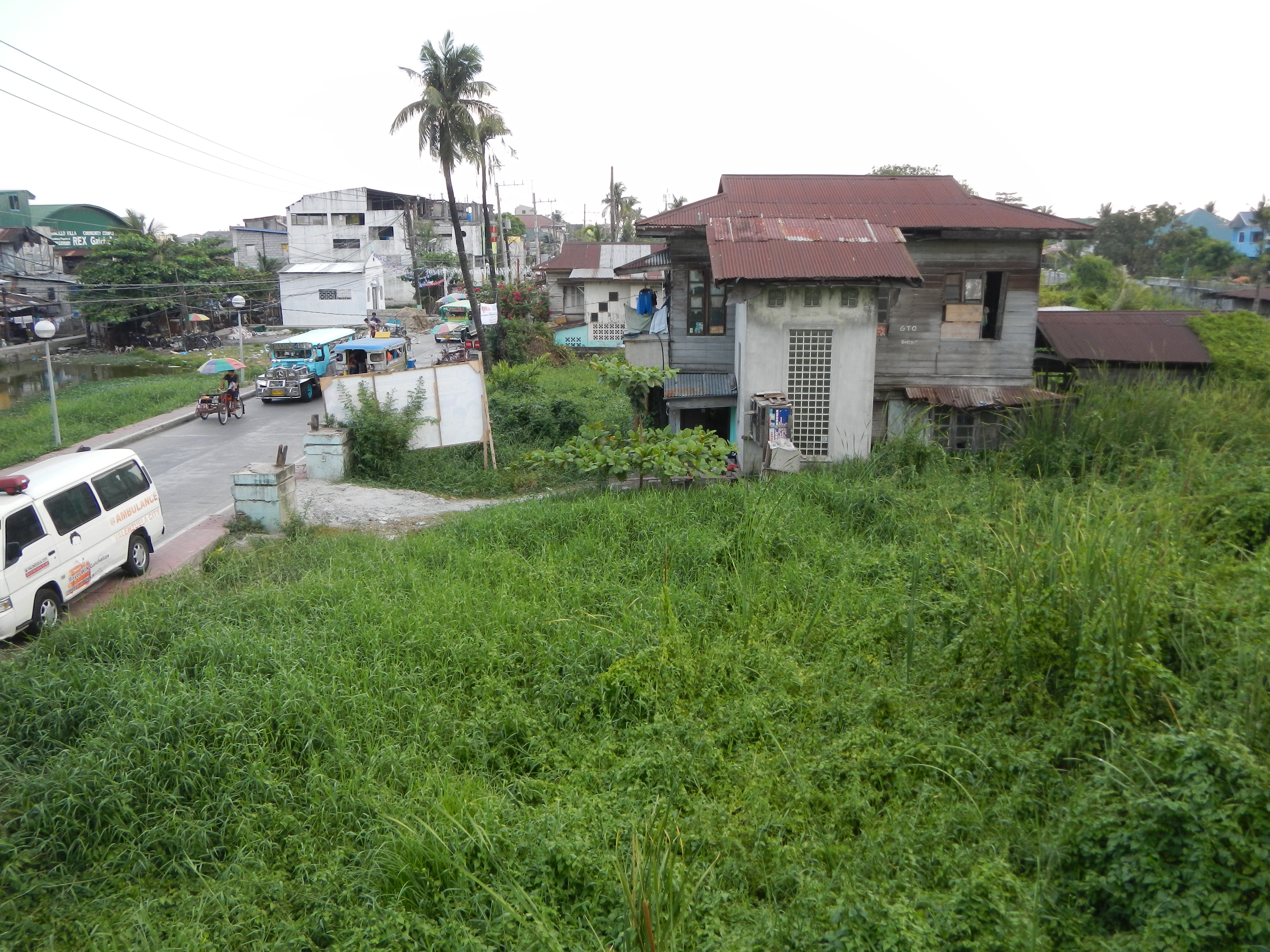
- View outside the barangay hall

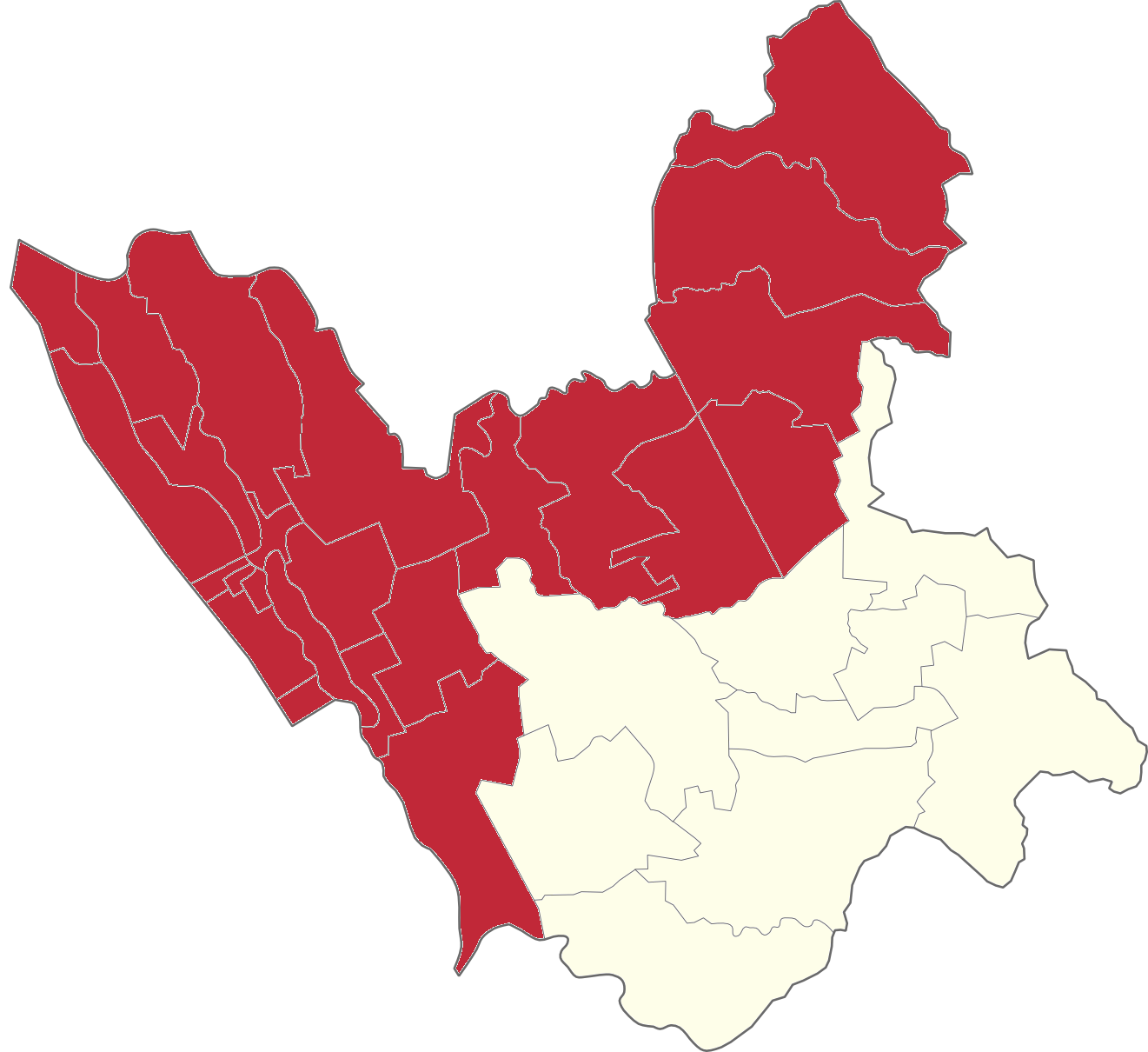
- Location of Pariancillo Villa in the 1st Valenzuela legislative district
- Coordinates: 14°42′26″N 120°56′37″E
- Country: Philippines
- Region: National Capital Region
- City: Valenzuela
- Congressional districts: Part of the 1st district of Valenzuela

Government
  - Barangay Chairman: Wilfredo Hernandez Panes

Area
  - Total: 5.00 km^{2} (1.93 sq mi)

Population (2007)
  - Total: 1,436
  - Density: 287/km^{2} (744/sq mi)
- ZIP code: 1444
- Area code: 2

Pariancillo Villa is one of the constituent barangays in the city of Valenzuela, Metro Manila, Philippines.

Pariancillo Villa was widely believed to be a cemetery for priests during the Spanish colonization of the Philippines. It is also the birthplace of Pío Valenzuela.

== Festivals ==
Residents celebrate a town fiesta celebration every November 12 for their patron saint, San Diego de Alcala.

== Landmarks ==
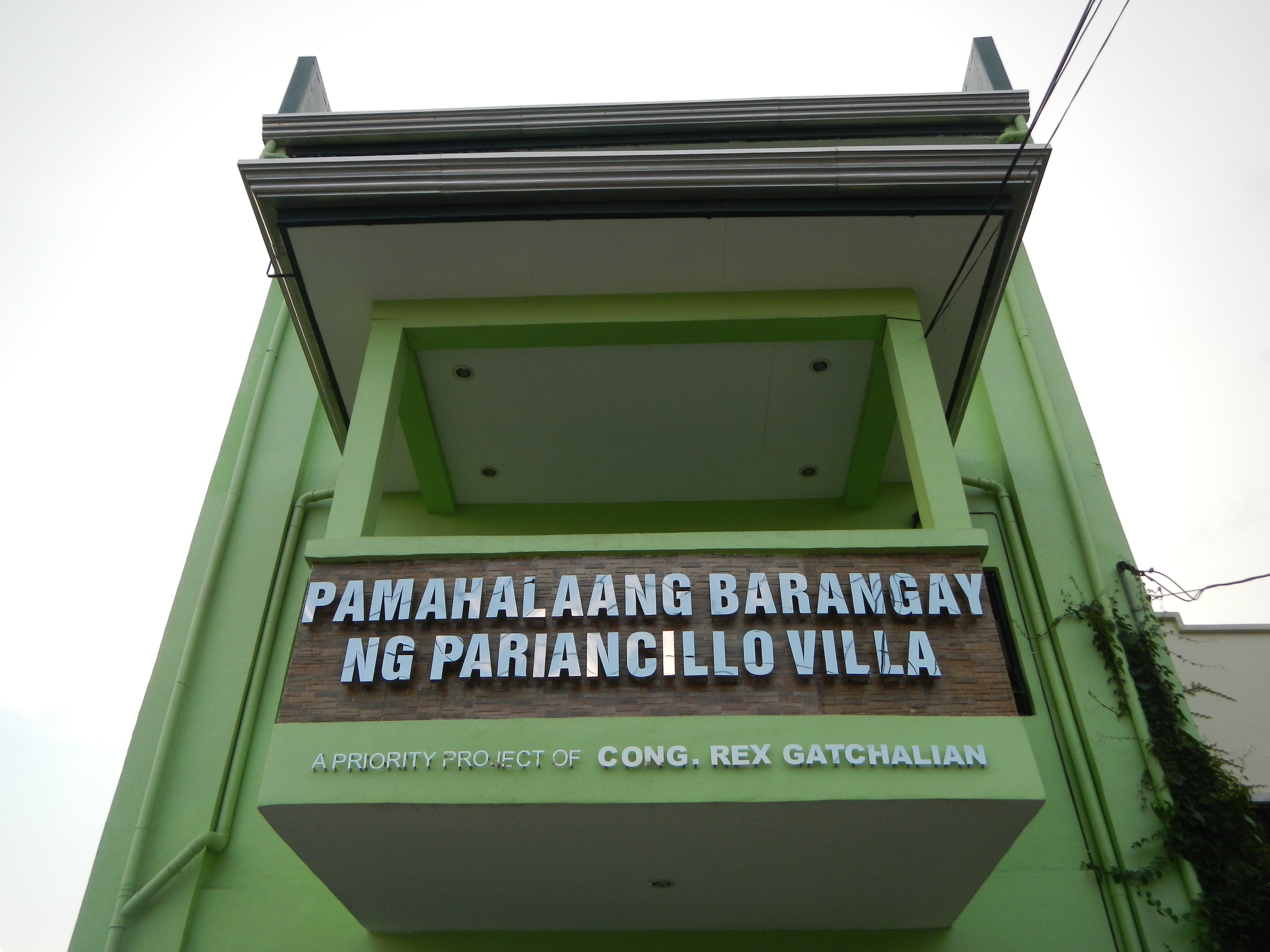
Barangay Hall

The settlement is mostly a residential area. One of the known sites in the barangay is the Pariancillo Villa Day Care Center.
