= Bignay, Valenzuela =

Barangay in Valenzuela City, Metro Manila, Philippines

Bignay
- Barangay
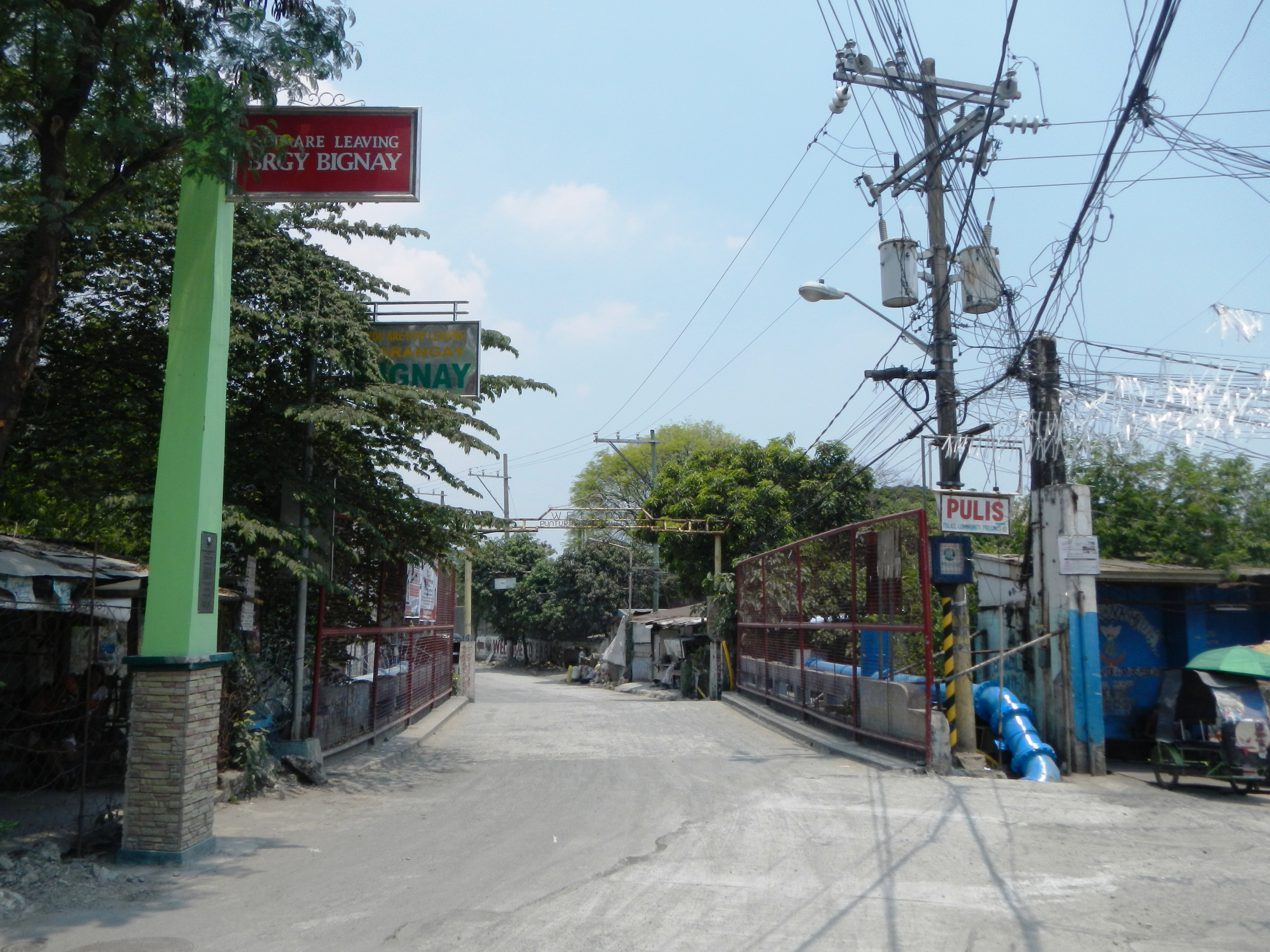
- Welcome arch
- Interactive map of Bignay
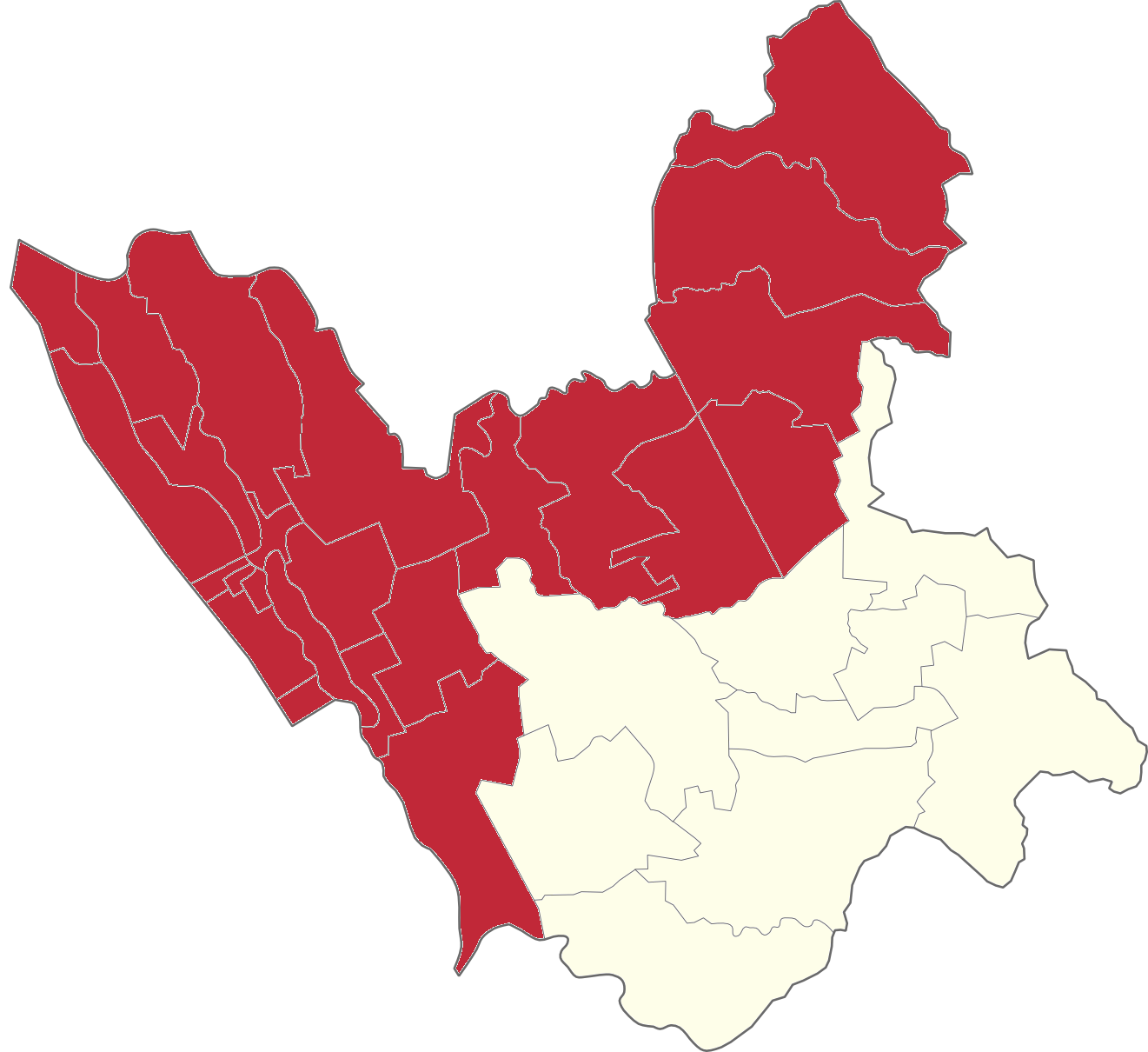
- Location of Bignay in the 1st Valenzuela legislative district
- Coordinates: 14°44′44″N 120°59′46″E
- Country: Philippines
- Region: National Capital Region
- City: Valenzuela City
- Congressional districts: Part of the 1st district of Valenzuela

Government
  - Barangay chairman: Graciano Francisco Victoriano

Area
  - Total: 2.688 km^{2} (1.038 sq mi)

Population (2020)
  - Total: 49,716
  - Density: 18,500/km^{2} (47,900/sq mi)

Bignay is a barangay in Valenzuela City, Philippines. It was named after a tree called bignay or Antidesma bunius that is plentiful in the area.

== Demographics ==
- Area: 268.8
- Population: 22,423
- Households: 5,017

== Education ==
- Bignay National High School
- Roberta De Jesus Elementary School
- Divine Mercy Academy
- Disiplina Village Bignay Elementary School
- Disiplina Village Bignay High School
- Claremont School of Valenzuela
