= Arkong Bato =

- Barangay
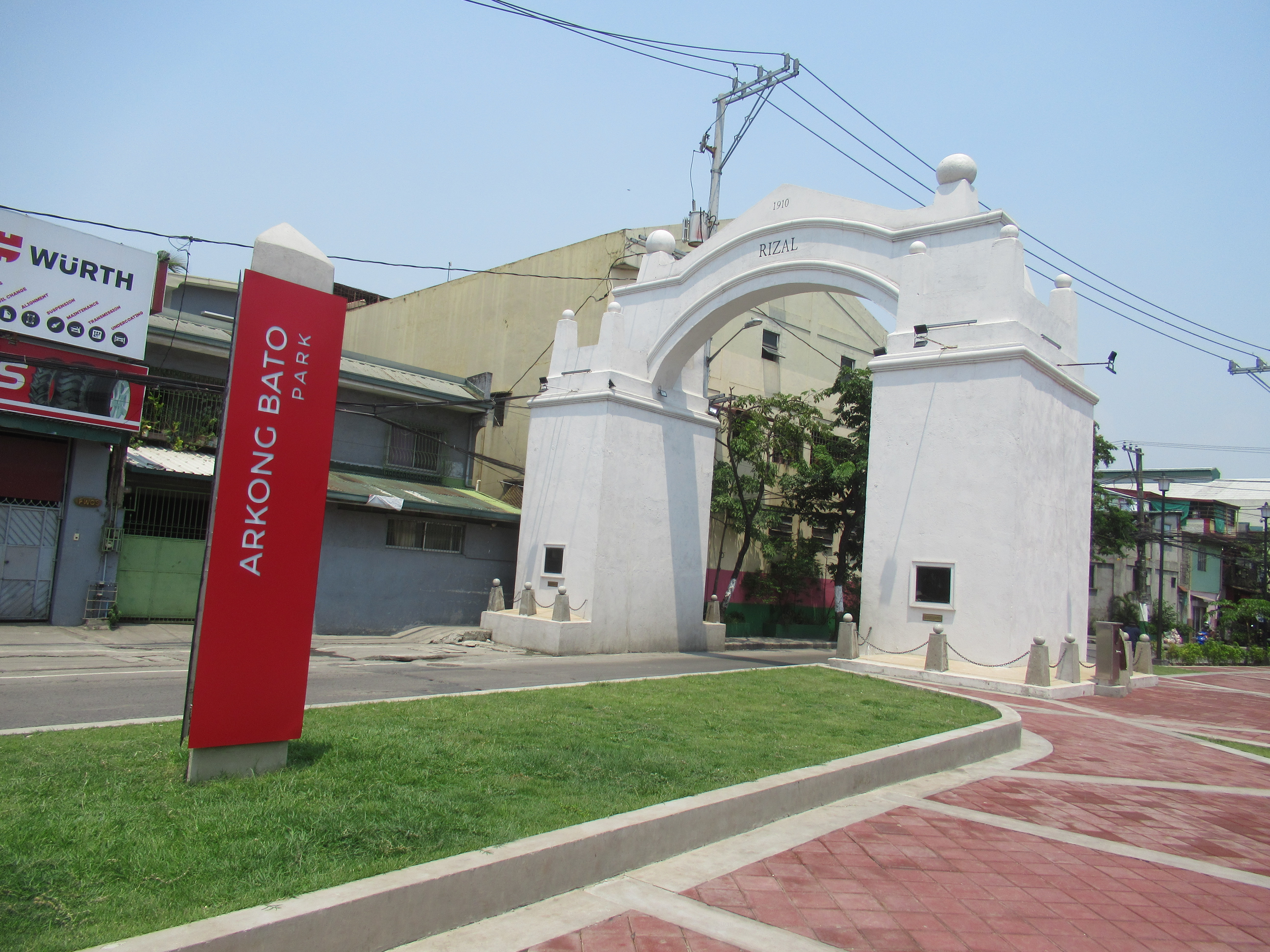
- Stone arch and linear park
- Interactive map of Arkong Bato
- Location of Arkong Bato in Metro Manila
- Coordinates: 14°41′53″N 120°57′3″E
- Country: Philippines
- Region: National Capital Region
- City: Valenzuela
- Congressional districts: Part of the 1st district of Valenzuela

Government
  - Barangay Chairman: AJ Feliciano

Area
  - Total: 0.34 km^{2} (0.13 sq mi)

Population (2020)
  - Total: 11,358
  - Density: 33,000/km^{2} (87,000/sq mi)
- ZIP code: 1444
- Area code: 2

Arkong Bato (lit. 'Stone Arch') is one of the constituent barangays in the city of Valenzuela, Metro Manila, Philippines.

Arkong Bato is a historical barangay named after the famous stone arch landmark on Marcelo H. Del Pilar Street that demarcates its boundary with Barangays Panghulo and Santolan in Malabon. The notable stone arch was built during American rule in 1910, originally as a boundary marker between Rizal and Bulacan provinces, which Malabon and Valenzuela were once part of, respectively.

== Festivals ==
Residents celebrate the Sta. Cruz fiesta every 3rd Sunday of May.

== Landmarks ==
Delfin Velilla monument

Some of the landmarks of the barangay include the Arkong Bato Chapel and the statue of Delfin Belilia Navarese at Navarette Street.
