= Balangkas, Valenzuela =

Barangay in Valenzuela City, Metro Manila, Philippines

Balangkas
- Barangay
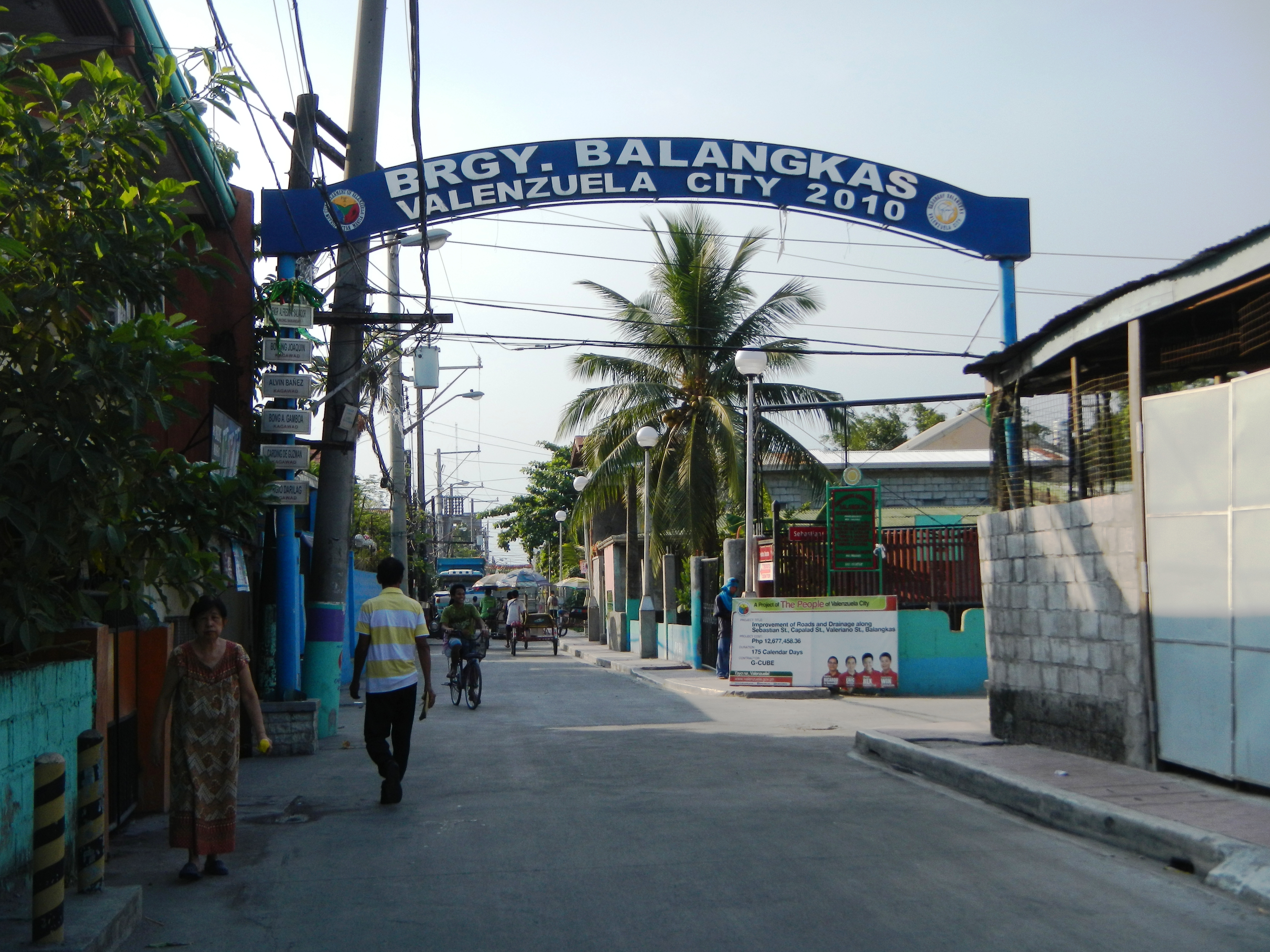
- Welcome Arch

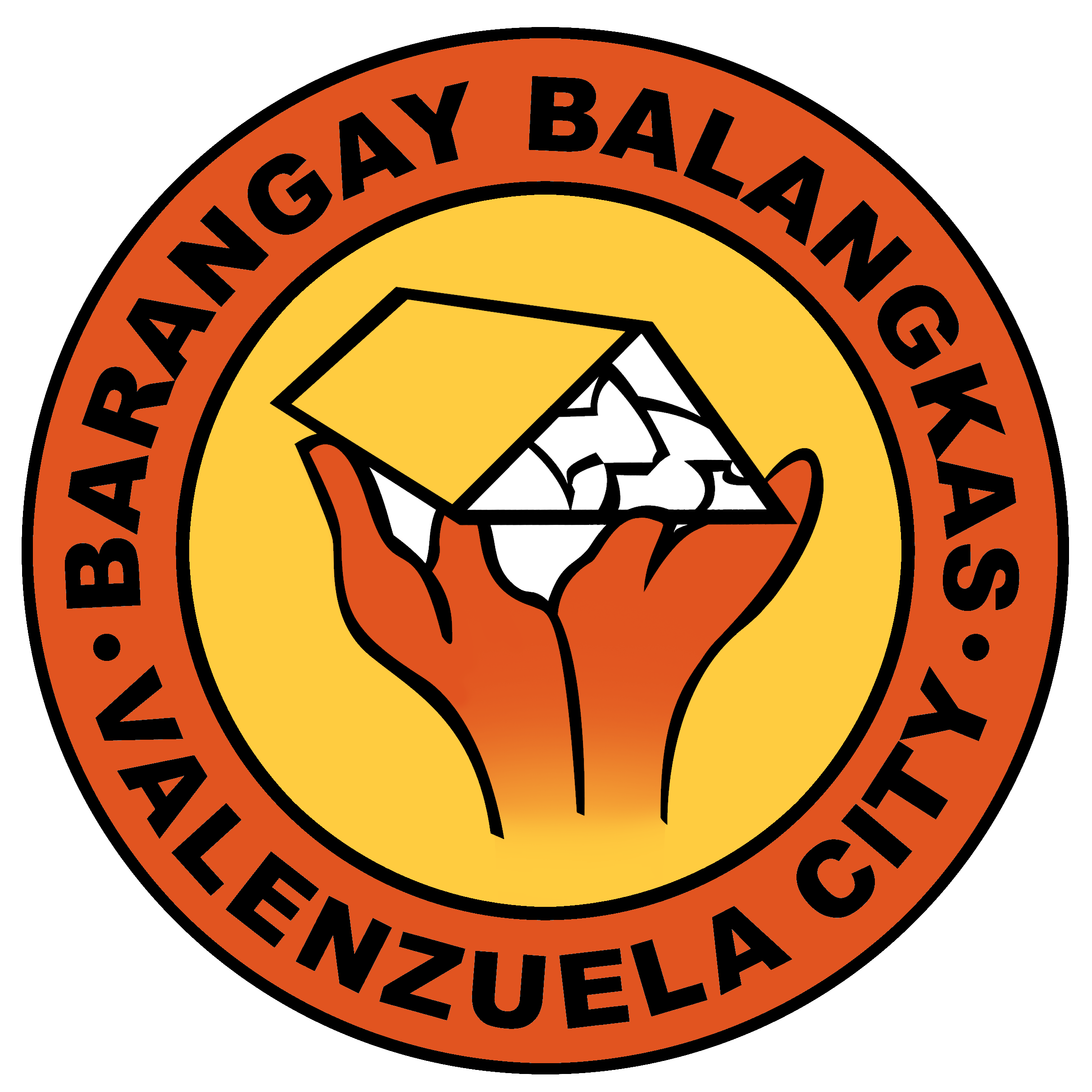
- Seal
- Motto: Valenzuela may Disiplina
- Interactive map of Balangkas
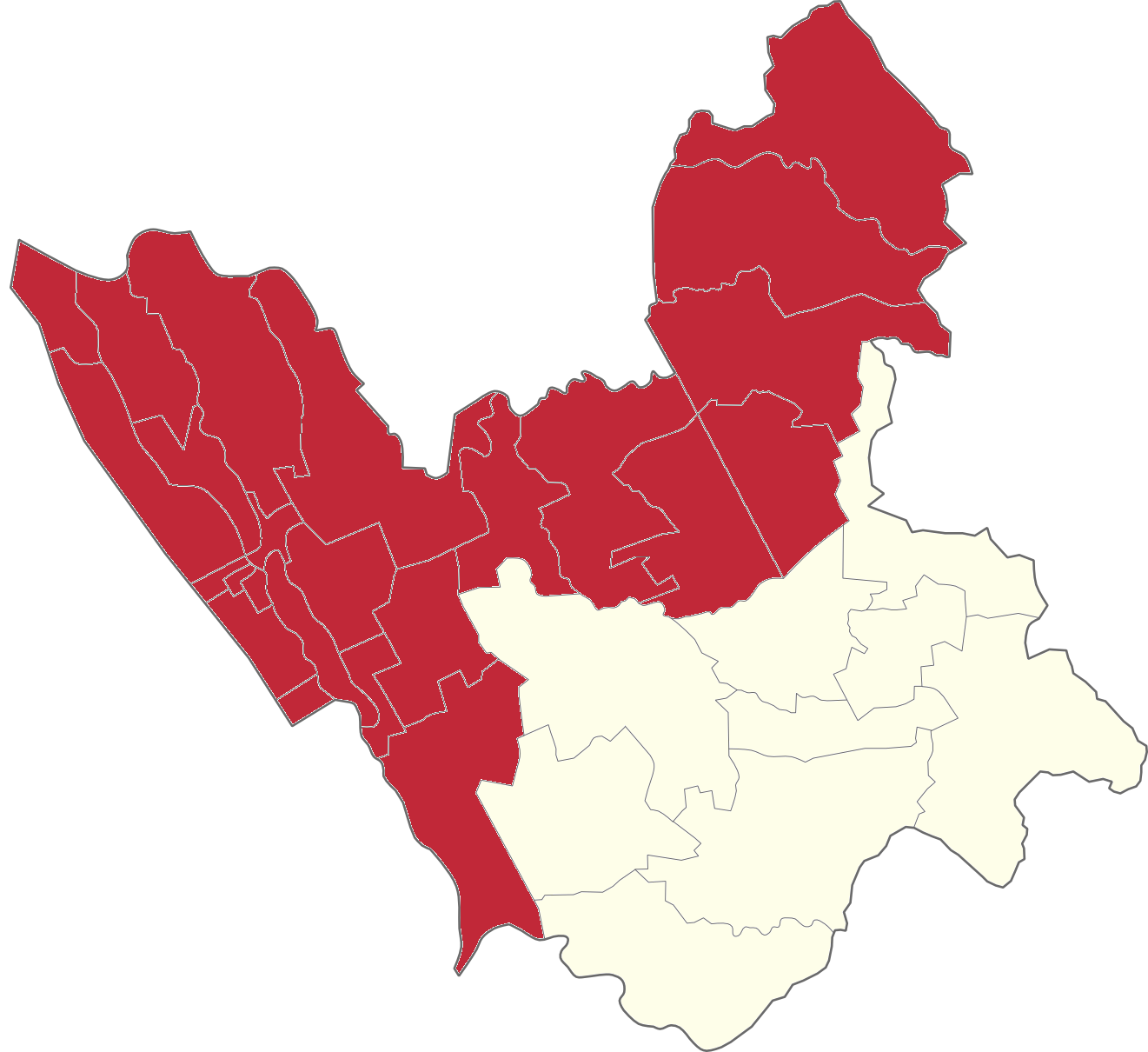
- Location of Balangkas in the 1st Valenzuela legislative district
- Coordinates: 14°43′02″N 120°56′10″E
- Country: Philippines
- Region: National Capital Region
- City: Valenzuela
- Congressional district: Part of the 1st district of Valenzuela

Government
  - Barangay Chairman: Sergio Reyes Darilag

Area
  - Total: 0.7330 km^{2} (0.2830 sq mi)

Population (2020)
  - Total: 14,318
  - Density: 19,530/km^{2} (50,590/sq mi)
- ZIP code: 1445
- Area code: 2

Balangkas is one of the barangays of Valenzuela, Metro Manila, Philippines. Balangkas is a Filipino word meaning "framework".

Balangkas is also known as "the barangay with two fiestas". Residents celebrate the feast day of San Jose every May 1. The fiesta of San Isidro is celebrated every May 15 by residents living in Sitio Bilog.

== Demographics ==
The area is 0.7330 km^{2} (0.2830 sq mi) with a population of 10,663 with 1,828 households.

== Schools ==
- A. Deato Elementary School
- Nuestra Señora de Guia Academy (The Guian's Academy)

== Religion ==
- Roman Catholic Chapel, P. Deato Street
- Balangkas Christian Baptist Church

== Gallery ==
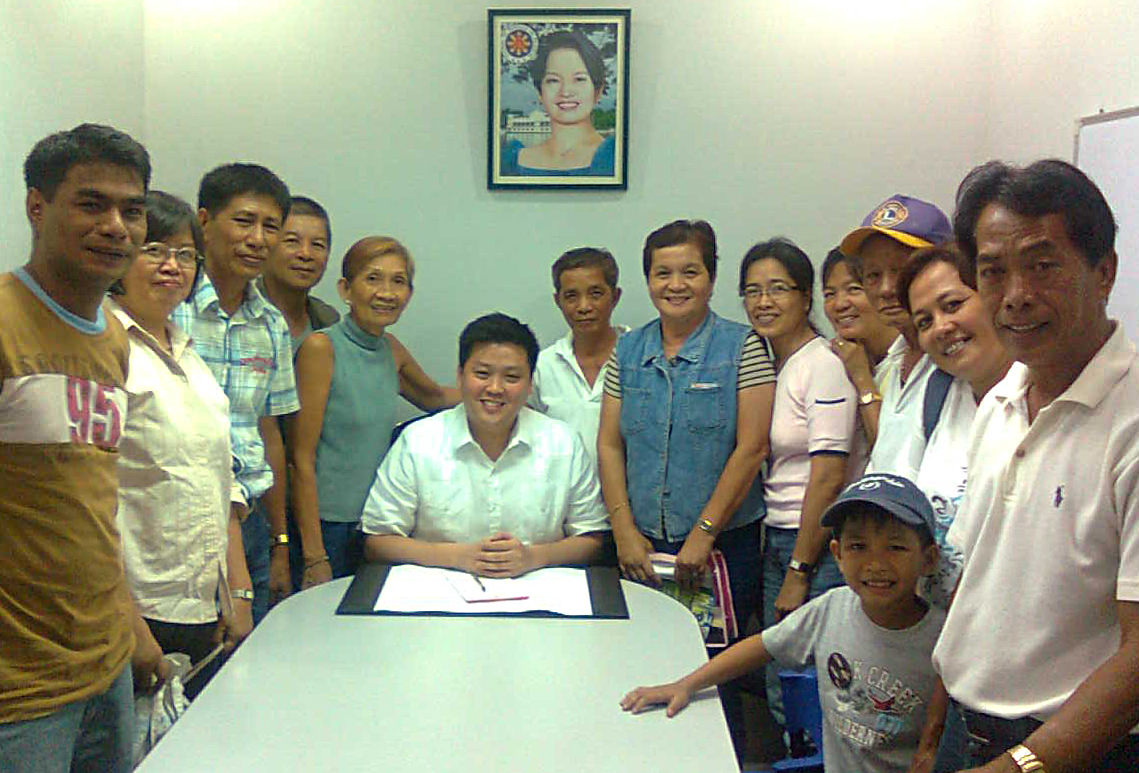
Residents of Kasoy Street, Barangay Balangkas meeting with then-Representative Rex Gatchalian.

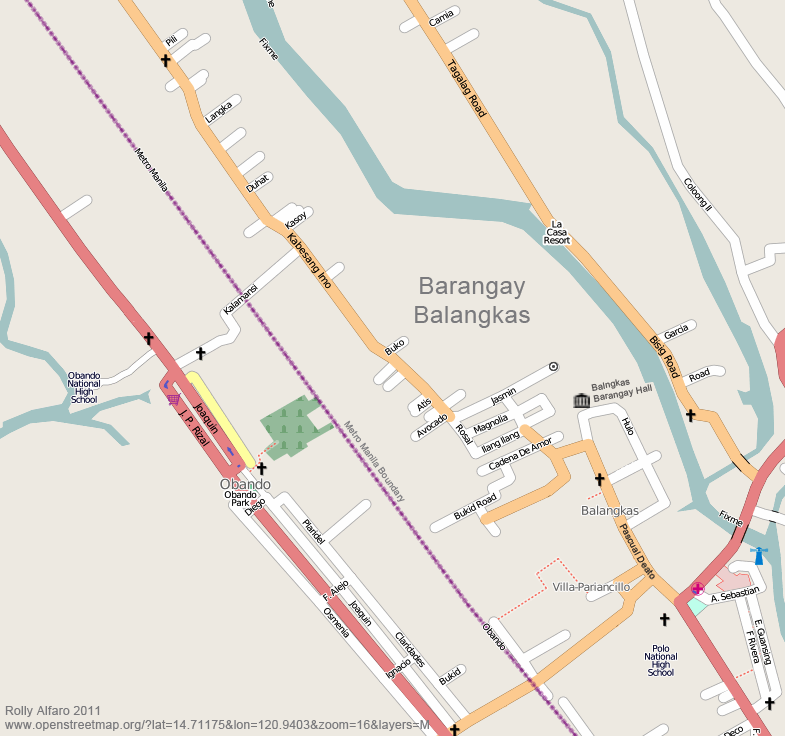
Barangay Balangkas map generated by OpenStreetMap

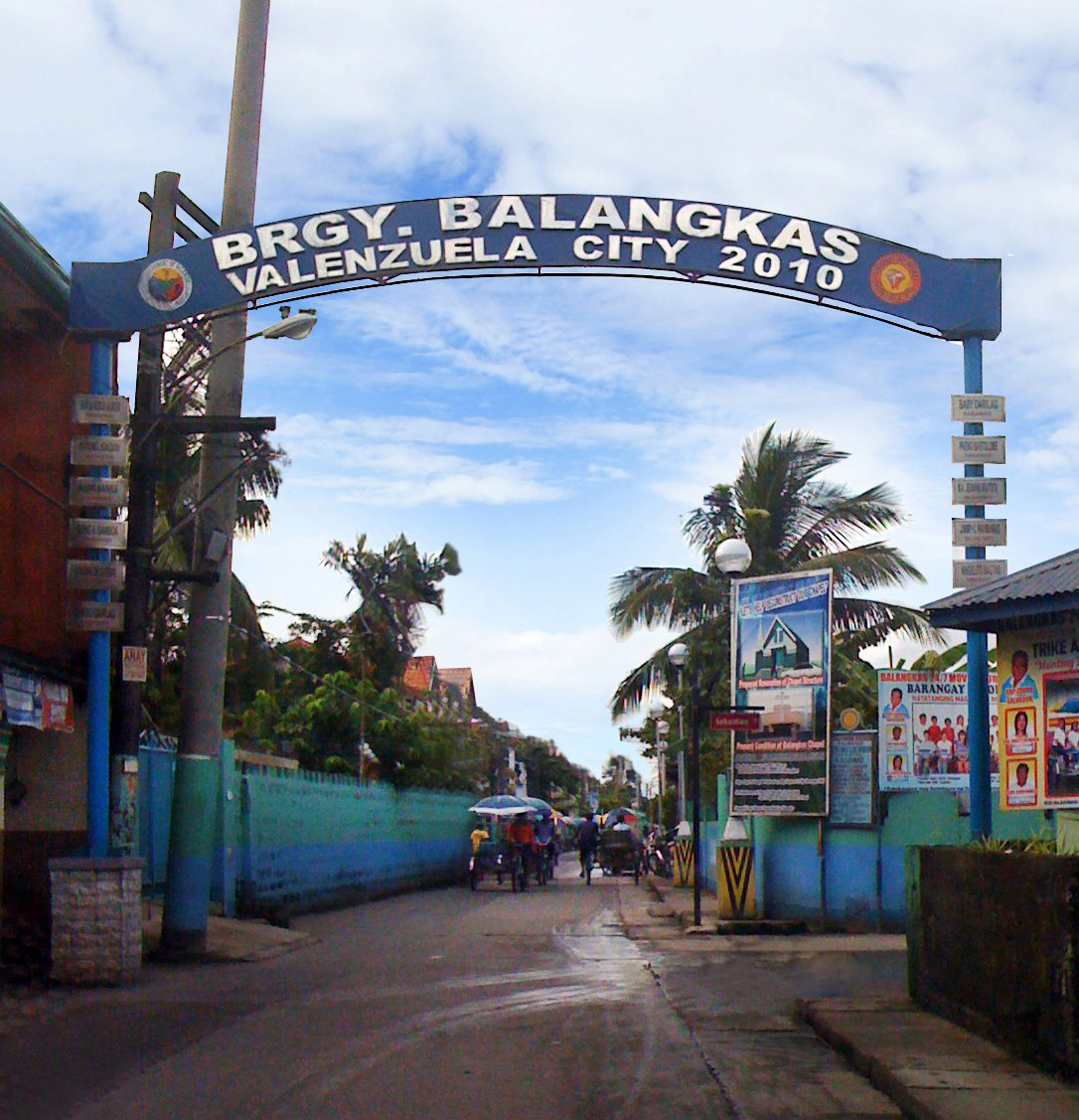
Welcome Arch

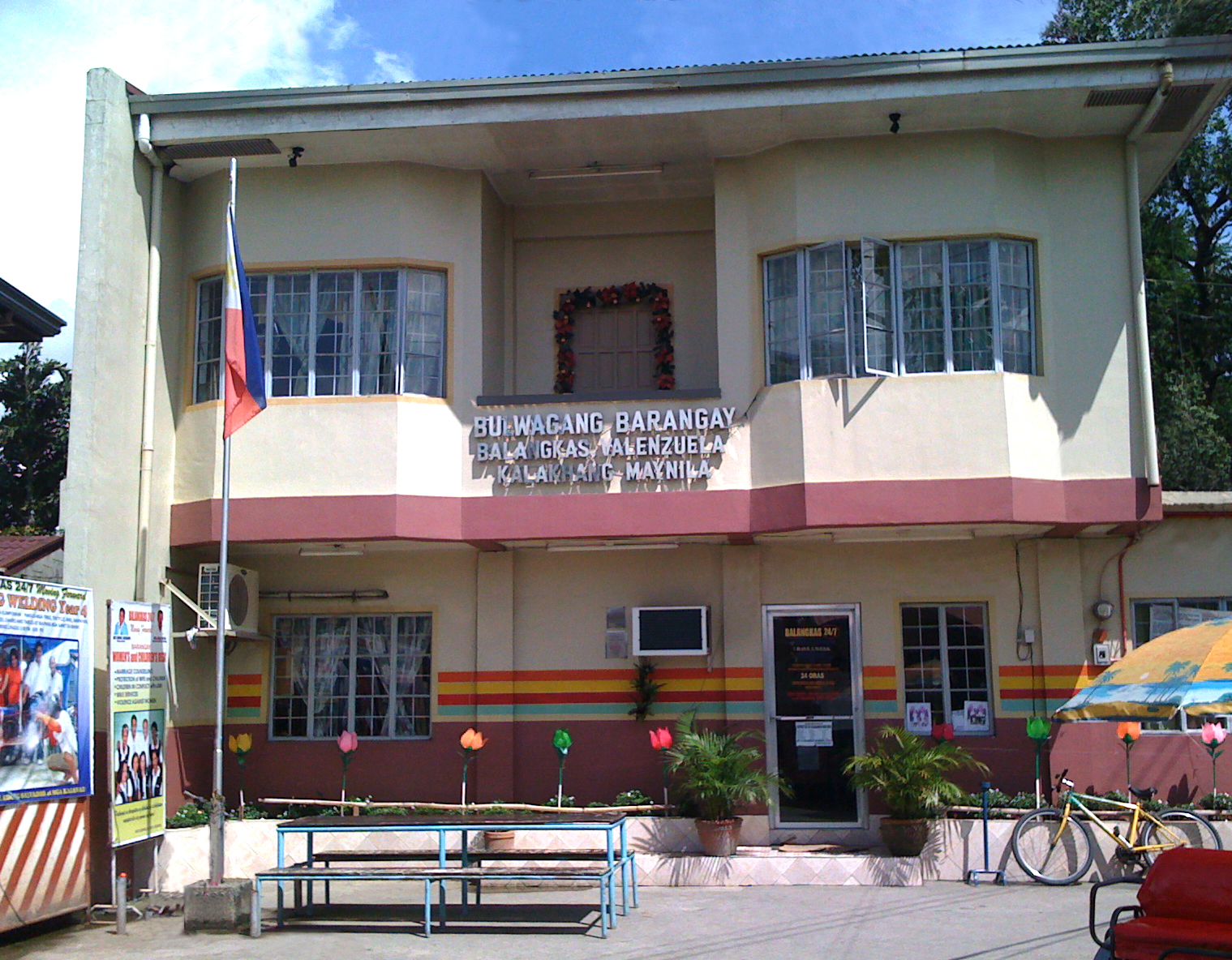
Balangkas Barangay Hall
