= Palasan, Valenzuela =

Barangay in Valenzuela City, Metro Manila, Philippines

Palasan
- Barangay
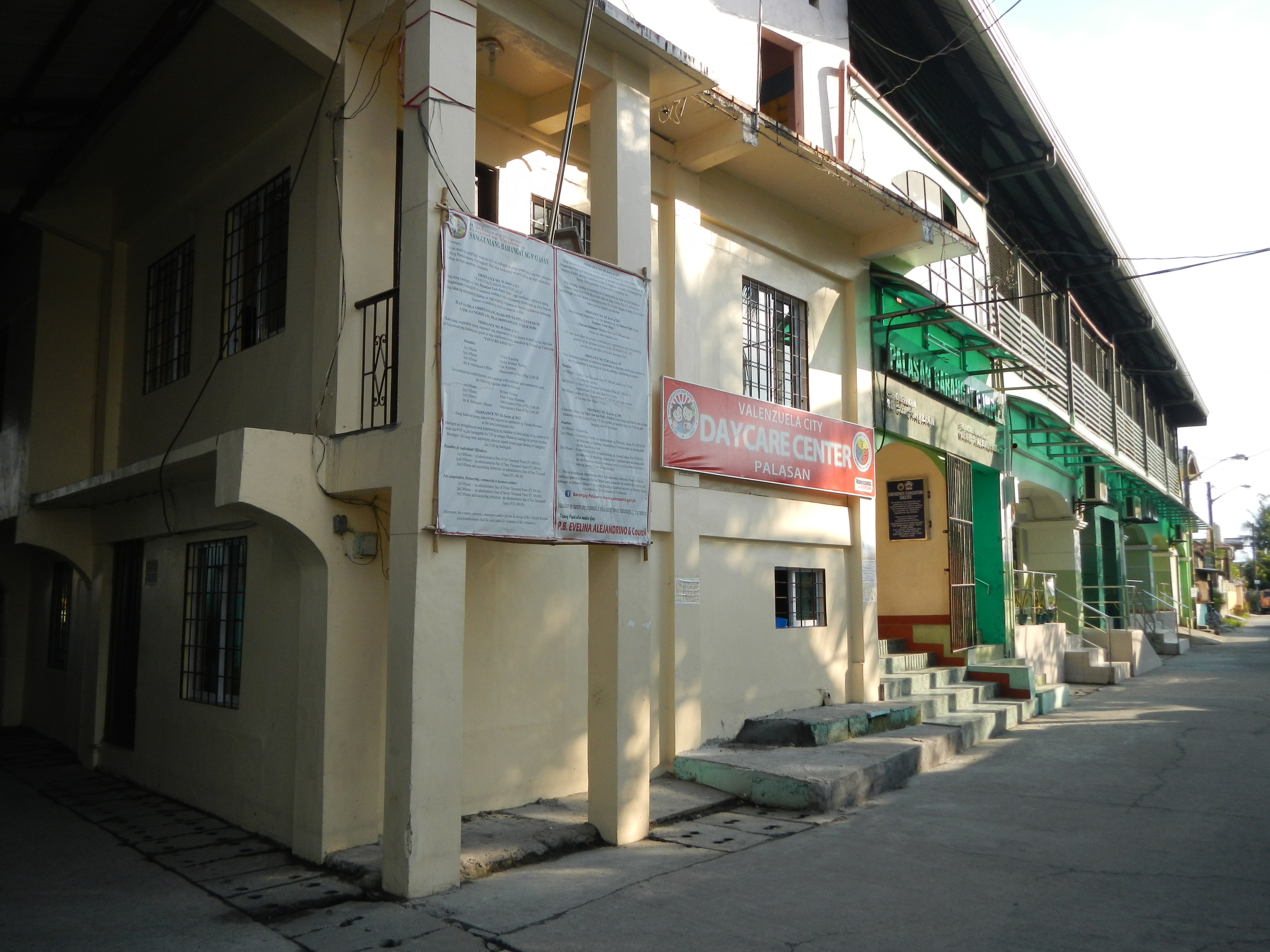
- Palasan Barangay Complex

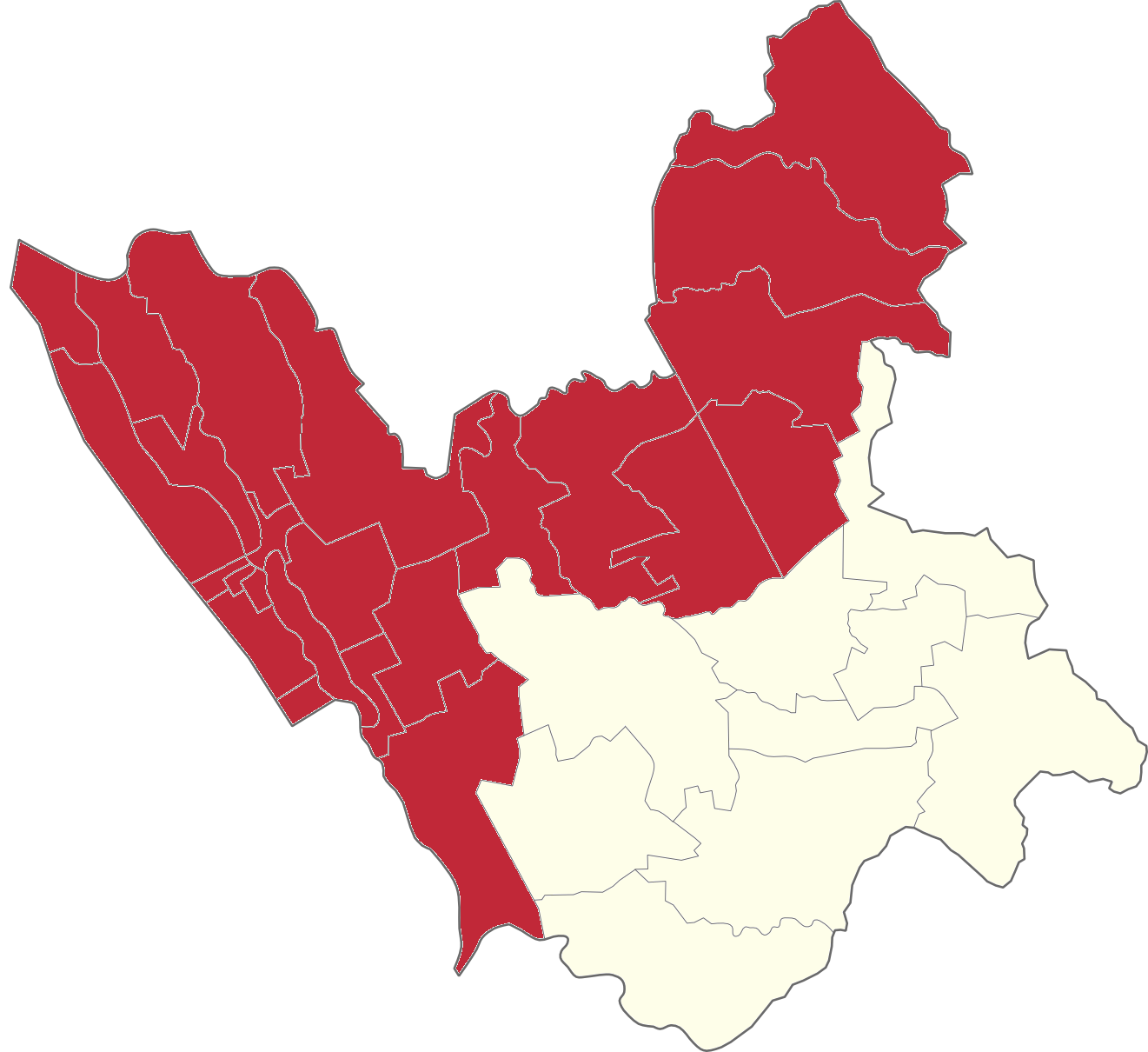
- Location of Palasan in the 1st Valenzuela legislative district
- Coordinates: 14°42′10″N 120°56′49″E
- Country: Philippines
- Region: National Capital Region
- City: Valenzuela
- Congressional districts: Part of the 1st district of Valenzuela

Government
  - Barangay Chairman: Evelina D. Alejandrino

Area
  - Total: 0.156 km^{2} (0.060 sq mi)

Population (2007)
  - Total: 5,195
  - Density: 33,300/km^{2} (86,200/sq mi)
- ZIP code: 1444
- Area code: 2

Palasan is one of the constituent barangays in the city of Valenzuela, Metro Manila, Philippines.

== Festivals ==
Palasan celebrates its fiesta every first Sunday of May for their patron saint, Sta. Cruz.

== Landmarks ==
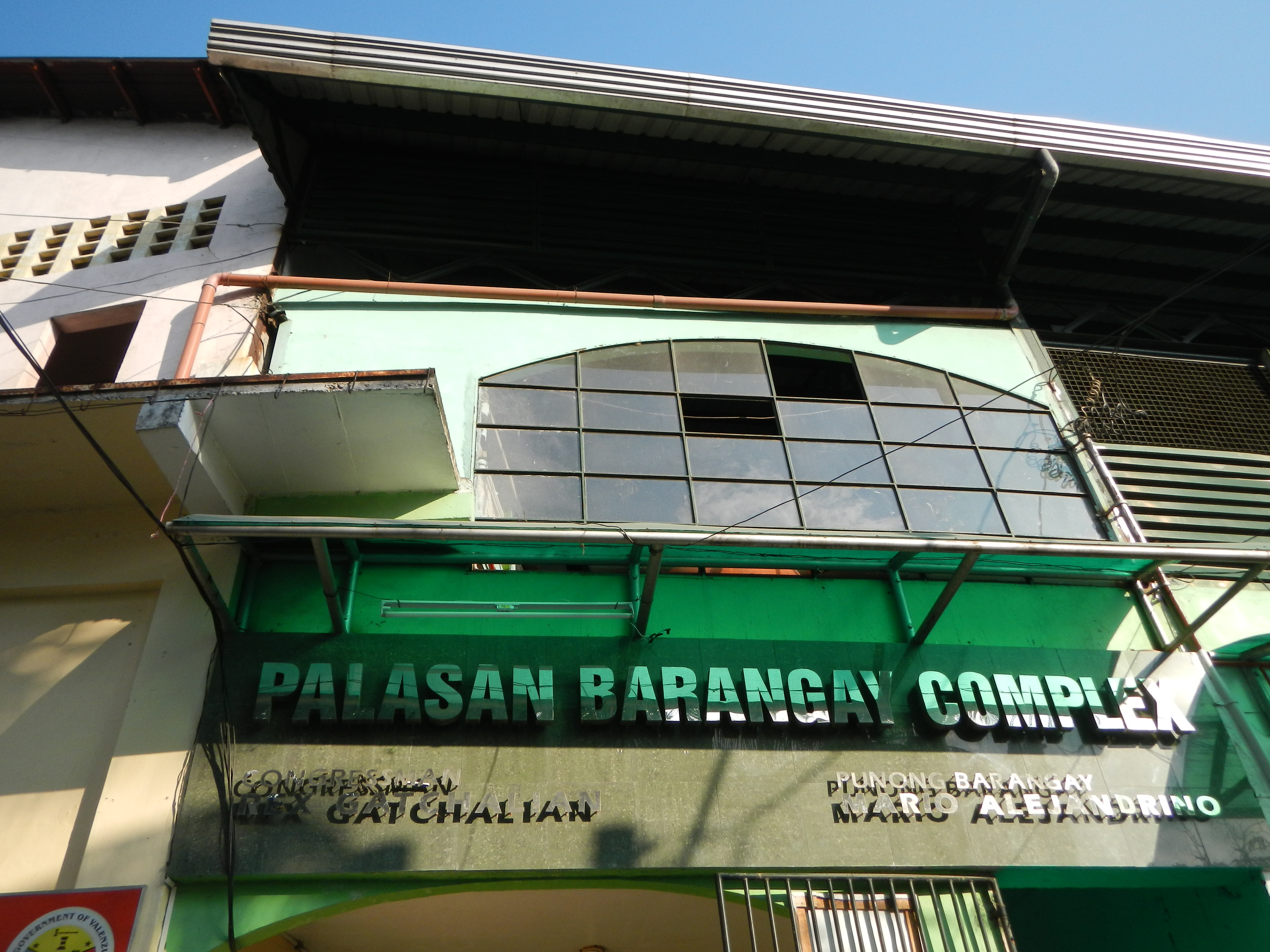
Barangay Hall

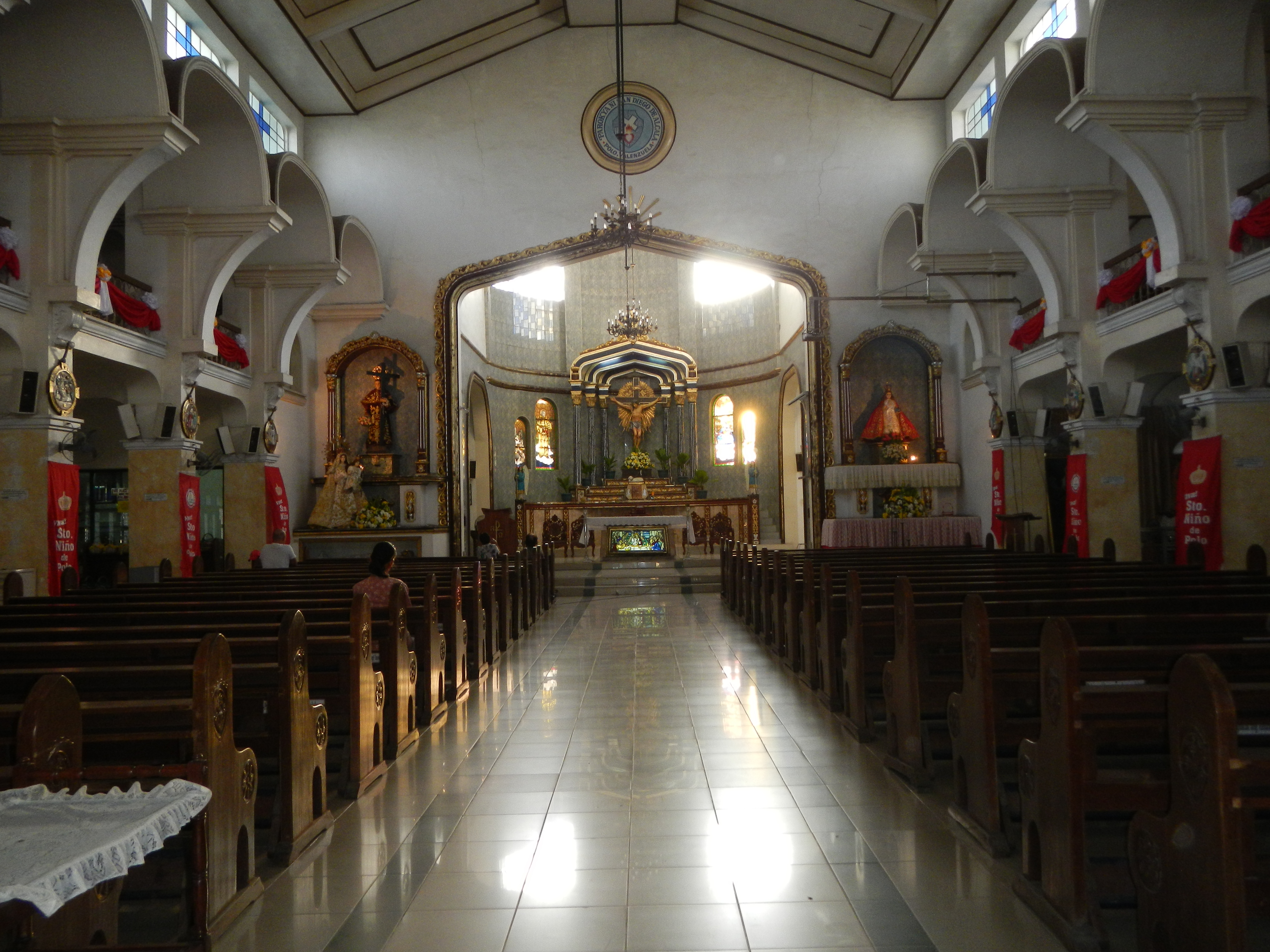
San Diego de Alcala Church

Establishments in the area include the Pio Valenzuela Elementary School, Polo National High School and San Diego de Alcala Parish Church, and Palasan River.

As of today, a lot of business establishments build around the vicinity, which are:

Lasam's Diner Kubyertos TeaTone PresidenTea Rapsa Ramen Eboy's Manok Andok's Chooks-to-Go Yin Yang Milk Tea Juancibo & Gungjeon
