= Veinte Reales =

Barangay in Valenzuela City, Metro Manila, Philippines

Veinte Reales Veinte Reales
- Barangay
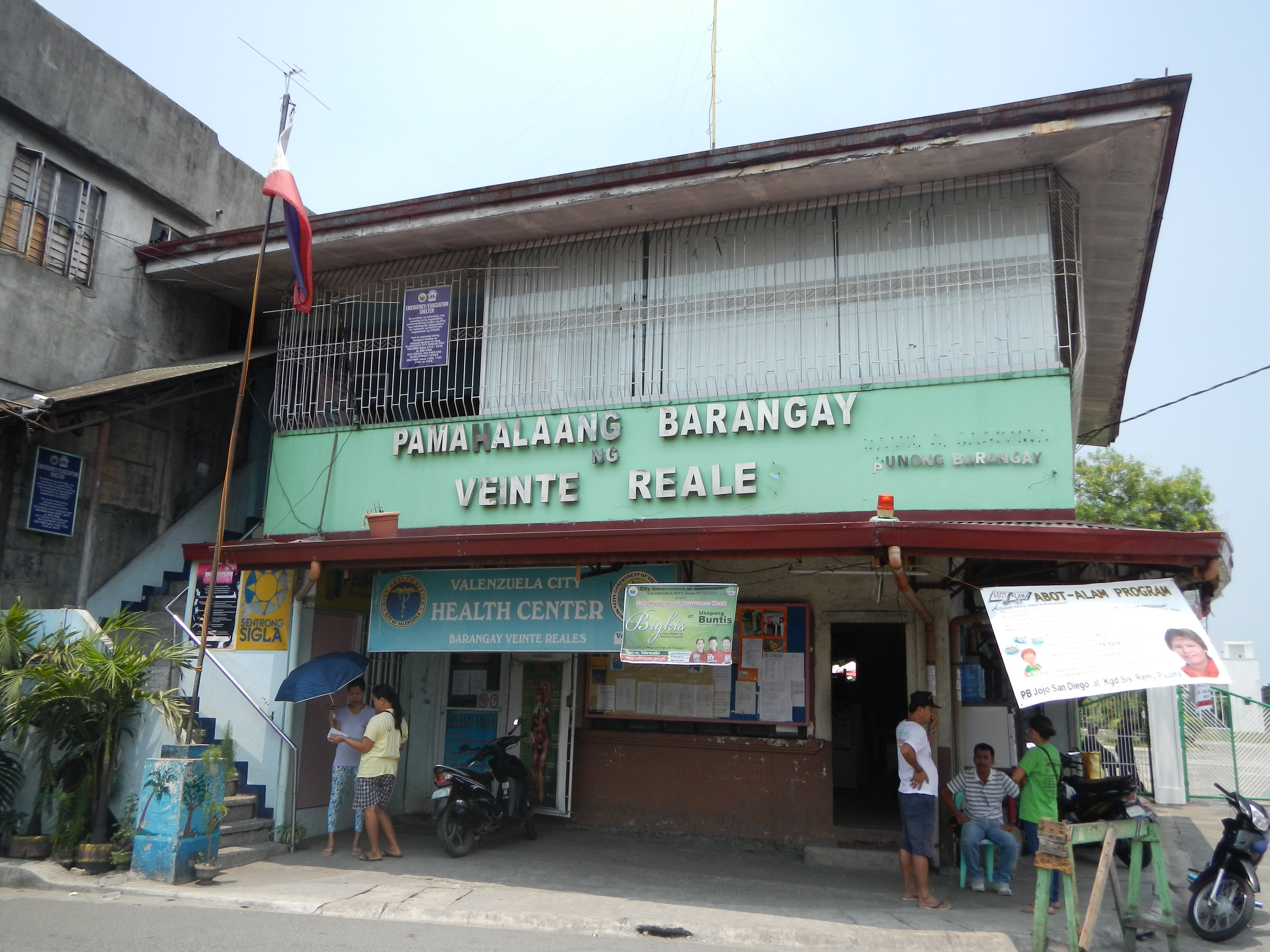
- Veinte Reales Barangay Hall

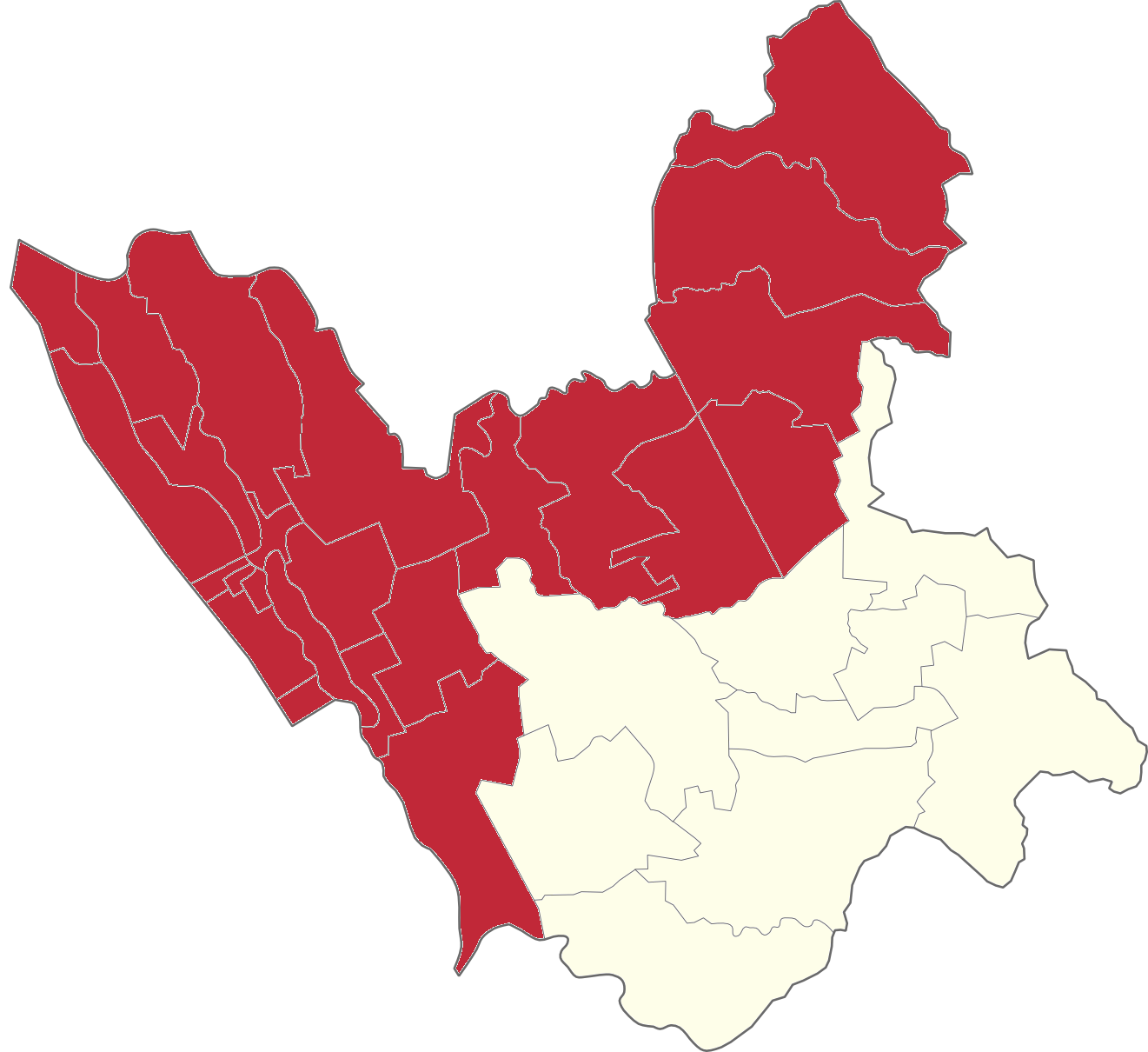
- Location of Veinte Reales in the 1st Valenzuela legislative district
- Coordinates: 14°42′56″N 120°57′58″E
- Country: Philippines
- Region: National Capital Region
- City: Valenzuela
- Congressional districts: Part of the 1st district of Valenzuela

Government
  - Barangay Chairman: Pio San Diego Jr.
  - Barangay Councilors: Remy Padilla, Shie Eleuterio, Kisha Ancheta, Onie Lumacad, Jojit Sanchez, Arman Cabrera, and Luis Salas

Area
  - Total: 1.9290 km^{2} (0.7448 sq mi)

Population (2020)
  - Total: 24,399
  - Density: 12,649/km^{2} (32,760/sq mi)
- ZIP code: 1444
- Area code: 2

Veinte Reales is one of the constituent barangays in the city of Valenzuela, Metro Manila in the Philippines. The barangay is home to industrial factories of wire, fishball, packaging and rubber products.

== Etymology ==
The origin of the name Veinte Reales came from a legend that their ancestors paid "veinte reales" or twenty reales (2.50 pesos) for the land to the Spaniards during the Spanish occupation of the Philippines. Another legend was that there was a magic well that contains delicious water that can quickly heal any sickness. But in order for you to drink it, you must pay Veinte Reales (20 reales).

== Education ==
The barangay has two public educational facilities for elementary (Paltok Elementary School and Luis Francisco Elementary school) and one facility for high school (Veinte Reales National High School).

== Economy ==
The barangay is home to industrial factories of home furnitures, steel, plastics, wire, fish balls, packaging and rubber products. Flexo Manufacturing Corporation, Meralco and Innovative are among the companies that are located in this barangay

== Landmarks ==
Famous landmarks in Veinte Reales include the Parish of the Risen Lord Church, Valenzuela Memorial Park, Lena Basketball Court and Bernabe Basketball Court.
