= Redbridge London Borough Council elections =

Local government elections in London, England

A map showing the wards of Redbridge from 2002 to 2018

Redbridge London Borough Council in London, England is elected every four years.

== Council elections ==
Year	Conservative	Labour	Liberal Democrats (Note: Liberal Party, 1964–1978; SDP–Liberal Alliance, 1982–1986.)	Redbridge Independents	Green (Note: Green Party (UK), 1986–1990.)	Reform	BNP	Council control after election
1964	45	15	0	—	—	—	—	Conservative
1968	55	5	0	—	—	—	—	Conservative
1971	42	18	0	—	—	—	—	Conservative
1974	45	15	0	—	—	—	—	Conservative
1978 (Note: Boundary changes increased the number of seats by three.)	50	13	0	—	—	—	—	Conservative
1982	51	12	0	—	—	—	—	Conservative
1986	47	15	1	—	0	—	—	Conservative
1990	42	18	3	—	0	—	—	Conservative
1994 (Note: Boundary changes reduced the number of seats by one. (Note: The East London Boroughs (London Borough Boundaries) Order 1993) (Note: The East London Boroughs (London Borough Boundaries) (No. 2) Order 1993))	24	29	9	—	—	—	0	No overall control
1998 (Note: Boundary changes took place but the number of seats remained the same. (Note: The Essex and Greater London (County Boundaries) Order 1993) (Note: The Redbridge and Waltham Forest (London Borough Boundaries) Order 1993))	23	30	9	—	0	—	—	No overall control
2002 (Note: Boundary changes increased the number of seats by one.)	33	21	9	—	0	—	0	Conservative
2006	34	19	9	—	0	—	1	Conservative
2010	30	26	7	—	0	—	0	No overall control
2014	25	35	3	—	0	—	—	Labour
2018 (Note: Boundary changes occurred but the number of seats remained the same.)	12	51	0	—	0	—	—	Labour
2022	5	58	0	—	0	—	—	Labour
2026	5	43	0	9	5	1	—	Labour

== Borough result maps ==
2002 results map

2006 results map

2010 results map

2014 results map

2018 results map

2022 results map

2026 results map

== By-elections ==
=== 1964-1968 ===
There were no by-elections.

=== 1968-1971 ===
- 1969 Park (Redbridge) by-election
- 1970 Goodmayes by-election

=== 1971-1974 ===
- 1971 Snaresbrook by-election
- 1973 Hainault by-election

=== 1974-1978 ===
- 1974 Clayhall by-election
- 1975 Snaresbrook by-election
- 1975 Woodford by-election
- 1976 Mayfield by-election
- 1976 Wanstead by-election
- 1977 Fairlop by-election

=== 1978-1982 ===
- 1978 Seven Kings by-election
- 1980 Seven Kings by-election
- 1980 Goodmayes by-election
- 1981 Hainault by-election

=== 1982-1986 ===
- 1983 Newbury by-election
- February 1984 Chadwell by-election
- 1984 Mayfield by-election
- 1984 Hainault by-election
- December 1984 Chadwell by-election

=== 1986-1990 ===
- 1987 Roding by-election
- 1989 Hainault by-election
- 1989 Fullwell by-election

=== 1990-1994 ===
- 1993 Cranbrook by-election
- 1993 Monkhams by-election

=== 1994-1998 ===
- 1994 Aldborough by-election
- 1996 Newbury by-election
- 1996 Barkingside by-election
- 1996 Seven Kings by-election
- 1997 Hainault by-election

=== 1998-2002 ===
- 1998 Aldborough by-election

=== 2002-2006 ===
- 2002 Newbury by-election
- 2003 Barkingside by-election
- 2003 Valentines by-election

=== 2006-2010 ===
Bridge by-election, 13 July 2006
Party	Candidate	Votes	%	±%
Conservative	Geoffrey D. Hinds	1,014	39.6	−13.1
BNP	Daniel Warville	857	33.4	+33.4
Labour	Mark A. Epstein	299	11.7	−7.2
Liberal Democrats	Angela E. Yeoman	245	9.6	−5.9
Green	David I. Reynolds	147	5.7	−7.1
Majority		157	6.2	
Turnout		2,562	30.3	
Conservative hold		Swing		

The by-election was called following the death of Cllr James Leal.

Clementswood by-election, 9 November 2006
Party	Candidate	Votes	%	±%
Liberal Democrats	Irfan Mustafa	904	41.9	+30.3
Labour	Mark A. Santos	715	33.1	−20.6
Conservative	Dennis J. Aylen	377	17.5	−0.5
Independent	Ben T. Brown	65	3.0	+3.0
Green	Timothy S. Randall	49	2.2	
British Public Party	Kashif Rana	48	2.2	−9.7
Majority		189		
Turnout			25.1	
Liberal Democrats gain from Labour		Swing		

The by-election was called following the death of Cllr Simon Green.

Cranbrook by-election, 10 July 2008
Party	Candidate	Votes	%	±%
Conservative	Matthew Chaudhary	1,625	60.0	+7.7
Labour	Barbara White	729	27.0	−4.5
Liberal Democrats	Helen A. Duffett	318	11.7	−4.5
BNP	Anthony Young	37	1.3	+1.3
Majority		896	33.0	
Turnout		2,709	30.0	
Conservative hold		Swing		

The by-election was called following the death of Cllr Charles Elliman.

Valentines by-election, 29 January 2009
Party	Candidate	Votes	%	±%
Liberal Democrats	Shoaib Patel	963	36.9	+20.1
Conservative	Ikram Wahid	781	29.9	+10.4
Labour	Surinder Pahl	756	28.9	−0.3
Respect	Abdurahman Jafar	112	4.3	+4.3
Majority		182		
Turnout			29.7	
Liberal Democrats gain from Labour		Swing		

The by-election was called following the resignation of Cllr Nadia J. Sharif.

Wanstead by-election, 23 April 2009
Party	Candidate	Votes	%	±%
Conservative	Alex Wilson	1300		
Liberal Democrats	Kate Garrett	1030		
Labour	Ross J. Hatfull	694		
Green	Ashley Gunstock	256		
BNP	Alfred John	171		
UKIP	Nick Jones	33		
Turnout				
Conservative hold		Swing		

The by-election was called following the death of Cllr Allan C. Burgess.

=== 2010-2014 ===
Chadwell by-election, 8 July 2010
Party	Candidate	Votes	%	±%
Labour	Wes Streeting	800	31.5	
Conservative	Gary Munro	580	22.9	
Liberal Democrats	John Tyne	576	22.7	
Green	Wilson Chowdhry	413	16.3	
BNP	Julian Leppert	115	4.5	
UKIP	Paul Wiffen	54	2.1	
Majority		220	8.6	
Turnout		2,542	25.5	
Labour hold		Swing		

The by-election was called following the disqualification of Mark Gittens.

Aldborough by-election, 11 November 2011
Party	Candidate	Votes	%	±%
Labour	Debbie Thiara	1,436		
Conservative	Melvyn Marks	1,071		
Liberal Democrats	Christopher Greaves	87		
UKIP	Paul Wiffen	83		
Green	Clive Durdle	64		
BNP	Danny Warville	34	1.2	
Majority		365		
Turnout		2,780	24.69	
Labour hold		Swing		

The by-election was called following the resignation of Cllr Mike Figg.

=== 2014-2018 ===
Roding by-election, 5 May 2016
Party	Candidate	Votes	%	±%
Labour	Lloyd Duddridge	1,832	40.9	+17.5
Conservative	Ruth Clark	1,254	28.0	+2.8
Liberal Democrats	Richard Clare	983	22.0	−6.3
UKIP	Jonathon Seymour	216	4.8	−9.6
Green	Barry Cooper	169	3.8	−4.8
All People's Party	Marilyn Moore	22	0.5	+0.5
Majority		578		
Turnout		4,515	52.4%	+11.8
Labour gain from Conservative		Swing		

The by-election was triggered by the resignation of Councillor Sarah Blaber (Conservative).

=== 2018-2022 ===
Loxford by-election, 6 May 2021
Party	Candidate	Votes	%	±%
Labour	Sahdia Warraich	2,184	69.6	−6.2
Conservative	Hasnain Ahmed	756	24.1	+8.6
Liberal Democrats	Al-Haj Uddin	197	6.3	+6.3
Majority		1,428	45.5	
Turnout		3,137		
Labour hold		Swing		

The by-election was triggered by the resignation of Councillor Chaudhary Iqbal (Labour).

Seven Kings by-election, 6 May 2021
Party	Candidate	Votes	%	±%
Labour	Pushpita Gupta	2,227	57.4	−21.4
Conservative	Greta Rene	791	20.4	−0.8
TUSC	Andy Walker	551	14.2	+14.2
Liberal Democrats	Naveed Akbar	313	8.1	+8.1
Majority		1,436	37.0	
Turnout		3,882		
Labour hold		Swing		

The by-election was triggered by the death of Councillor Stuart Bellwood (Labour).

=== 2022-2026 ===
Wanstead Park by-election, 14 November 2024
Party	Candidate	Votes	%	±%
Labour	Emma Shepherd-Mallinson	934	46.9	−5.4
Conservative	Daniel Moraru	349	17.5	−1.5
Ilford Independents	Sharula Kangle	284	14.2	+14.2
Green	Al-Haj Uddin	222	11.1	−7.5
Liberal Democrats	Neil Hepworth	109	5.5	−4.6
Reform	Raj Forhad	95	4.8	+4.8
Majority		585	29.4	
Turnout		1,993		
Labour hold		Swing		

The by-election was triggered by the resignation of Councillor Bayo Alaba (Labour).

Mayfield by-election, 27 March 2025
Party	Candidate	Votes	%	±%
Ilford Independents	Noor Jahan Begum	1,080	42.5	New
Labour	Mazhar Saleem	663	26.1	▼50.0
Conservative	Robin Thakur	494	19.4	▲2.4
Reform	Paul Luggeri	121	4.8	New
Liberal Democrats	Neil Hepworth	100	3.9	▼3.5
Green	Nadir Iqbal Gilani	85	3.3	New
Turnout		2,549	24.65	▼5.65
Redbridge Ind. gain from Labour				

The by-election was triggered by the resignation of Cllr Jas Athwal, who had become an MP.

Hainault by-election, 1 May 2025
Party	Candidate	Votes	%	±%
Labour	Helen Mullis	835	28.8	−21.4
Independent	Glen Haywood	834	28.8	+28.8
Reform	Raj Forhad	611	21.1	+21.1
Conservative	Teresa Blohm	421	14.5	−28.4
Green	Nirojan Raveendralingam	125	4.3	+4.3
Liberal Democrats	Cathy Davies	73	2.5	+2.5
Majority		1	<0.1	
Turnout		2,899		
Labour hold		Swing		

The by-election was triggered by the resignation of Councillor Sam Gould (Labour).
