= Sanjib Bhattacharjee =

British campaigner

Sanjib Bhattacharjee BEM
- Bhattacharjee in 2026
- Born: India
- Occupations: Driving instructor trainer and mentor

Sanjib Bhattacharjee BEM is a British-Indian campaigner and driving instructor trainer, mentor and road safety advocate based in London, United Kingdom. He was awarded the British Empire Medal (BEM) in the 2025 New Year's Honours list in recognition of his involvement in community service and road safety initiatives in the London Boroughs of Newham, Redbridge, and Waltham Forest.

== Early life ==
Bhattacharjee began his community service during his student years in India, where he volunteered with the Indian Red Cross Society. He moved to the UK in 1998.

== Road safety ==
As a road safety advocate, Bhattacharjee has spoken about challenges within the driving test industry in the United Kingdom, including test delays and its impact on key workers. He has called for government action to address issues such as the resale of test appointments and examiner shortages. Bhattacharjee has written on road safety, driver awareness and community safety topics. His published articles have addressed emergency vehicle awareness, driver wellbeing, observation techniques and the Mirror-Signal-Manoeuvre (MSM) routine.

He has organised workshops focused on improving hazard perception and safe driving practices, and has advocated for clearer road markings and pedestrian safety measures. Bhattacharjee contributed to the development of UK road safety reforms, including the introduction of seatbelt penalty points, expanded roadside drug testing, and advocacy for Graduated Driver Licensing (GDL).

Bhattacharjee has campaigned for Indian road safety as well, emphasising the need for mandatory road safety education.

Currently, Bhattacharjee is a road safety campaigner and since 2014, an Approved Driving Instructor and trainer.

== Awards and recognition ==
Bhattacharjee received a BEM for his contributions to the community. His contributions were also acknowledged by Edmund King OBE, President of the AA, who commended Bhattacharjee for his dedication to improving road safety and congratulated him on his achievements. He attended the Cabinet Office press briefing at the Tower of London on the 30th December 2024, where he discussed his work in road safety education.

He is believed to be the first London Driving Instructor Trainer to receive the national honour while working in the role.

== Politics ==
Bhattacharjee was a political candidate in the London Borough of Redbridge for the 2010, 2014 and 2018 local elections and chairman of the Ilford North Constituency . He subsequently joined the Conservative Party, citing dissatisfaction with the Labour leadership at the time, stating that he could "no longer defend Ed Miliband and Ed Balls". His decision to support the Conservative Party during then-candidate Wes Streeting's campaign to challenge the Ilford North seat was described as a "blow".
