= 2006 Redbridge London Borough Council election =

| ← 2002 | 4 May 2006 | 2010 → |

All 63 council seats on Redbridge London Borough Council 32 seats needed for a majority
| | First party | Second party | Third party |
|---|---|---|---|
| Party | Conservative | Labour | Liberal Democrats |
| Seats won | 34 | 19 | 9 |
| Seat change | ▲1 | ▼2 | 0 |
| Popular vote | 29,354 | 22,261 | 14,882 |
| Percentage | 39.1% | 29.6% | 19.8% |
| Swing | ▼2.9% | ▼3.4% | ▲0.5% |
| | Fourth party |
| Party | BNP |
| Seats won | 1 |
| Seat change | ▲1 |
| Popular vote | 2,463 |
| Percentage | 3.3% |
| Swing | ▲1.7% |
- Map of the results of the 2006 Redbridge council election. BNP in dark blue, Conservatives in blue, Labour in red and Liberal Democrats in yellow.
Council control before election
Conservative
Council control after election
Conservative

Elections for London Borough of Redbridge Council were held on Thursday 4 May 2006. The whole council was up for election. Redbridge is divided into 21 wards, each electing 3 councilors, so a total of 63 seats were up for election.

== Election result ==
Redbridge local election result 2006
| Party | Seats | Gains | Losses | Net gain/loss | Seats % | Votes % | Votes | +/− |
|---|---|---|---|---|---|---|---|---|
| Conservative | 34 | 1 | 0 | ▲1 | 54.0 | 39.1 | 29,354 | ▼2.9 |
| Labour | 19 | 0 | 2 | ▼2 | 30.2 | 29.6 | 22,261 | ▼3.4 |
| Liberal Democrats | 9 | 0 | 0 | 0 | 14.3 | 19.8 | 14,882 | ▲0.5 |
| BNP | 1 | 1 | 0 | ▲1 | 1.6 | 3.3 | 2,463 | ▲1.7 |
| Green | 0 | 0 | 0 | 0 | 0.0 | 5.6 | 4,222 | ▲2.8 |
| Independent | 0 | 0 | 0 | 0 | 0.0 | 1.1 | 863 | New |
| British Public Party | 0 | 0 | 0 | 0 | 0.0 | 1.0 | 782 | New |
| UKIP | 0 | 0 | 0 | 0 | 0.0 | 0.4 | 329 | 0.0 |

== Ward results ==
=== Aldborough ===
Aldborough (3)
| Party | Candidate | Votes | % | ±% |
|---|---|---|---|---|
| Conservative | Vanessa Cole | 1,877 | 46.6 | |
| Conservative | Ruth Clark | 1,804 | | |
| Conservative | Loraine Sladden | 1,683 | | |
| Labour | John Coombes | 1,391 | 34.6 | |
| Labour | Hedda Harris | 1,150 | | |
| Labour | Mark Epstein | 1,118 | | |
| Liberal Democrats | Leslie Everest | 424 | 10.5 | |
| Liberal Democrats | Leonard Filtness | 406 | | |
| Green | Susanne Marshall | 334 | 8.3 | |
| Liberal Democrats | Monique Seeff | 295 | | |
| Turnout | | | 39.5 | |
| Conservative hold | | Swing | | |
| Conservative gain from Labour | | Swing | | |
| Conservative hold | | Swing | | |

=== Barkingside ===
Barkingside (3)
| Party | Candidate | Votes | % | ±% |
|---|---|---|---|---|
| Conservative | Graham Borrott | 1,976 | 57.9 | |
| Conservative | Keith Prince | 1,963 | | |
| Conservative | Ashley Kissin | 1,958 | | |
| Labour | Sam Hardy | 1,036 | 30.3 | |
| Labour | Irfan Mustafa | 993 | | |
| Labour | Kezhakeadathu Mathews | 975 | | |
| Liberal Democrats | Florence Boyland | 402 | 11.8 | |
| Liberal Democrats | Joan Barmby | 389 | | |
| Liberal Democrats | Christina Bradd | 385 | | |
| Turnout | | | 41.2 | |
| Conservative hold | | Swing | | |
| Conservative hold | | Swing | | |
| Conservative hold | | Swing | | |

=== Bridge ===
Bridge (3)
| Party | Candidate | Votes | % | ±% |
|---|---|---|---|---|
| Conservative | John Fairley-Churchill | 1,665 | 52.7 | |
| Conservative | James Leal | 1,617 | | |
| Conservative | Robin Turbefield | 1,521 | | |
| Labour | Lucinda Culpin | 598 | 18.9 | |
| Labour | Neil McKellar | 510 | | |
| Labour | Martin Chew | 507 | | |
| Liberal Democrats | Angela Yeoman | 490 | 15.5 | |
| Liberal Democrats | Valerie Taylor | 464 | | |
| Liberal Democrats | Andrew Diamond | 422 | | |
| Green | David Reynolds | 404 | 12.8 | |
| Turnout | | | 35.0 | |
| Conservative hold | | Swing | | |
| Conservative hold | | Swing | | |
| Conservative hold | | Swing | | |

=== Chadwell ===
Chadwell (3)
| Party | Candidate | Votes | % | ±% |
|---|---|---|---|---|
| Liberal Democrats | Gary Staight | 1,406 | 38.1 | |
| Liberal Democrats | John Tyne | 1,266 | | |
| Liberal Democrats | Ralph Scott | 1,244 | | |
| Conservative | Simon Hearn | 889 | 24.1 | |
| Conservative | Rosemary Barden | 837 | | |
| Conservative | Dennis Aylen | 781 | | |
| Labour | Shafiq Chowdhry | 772 | 20.9 | |
| Labour | Gerald Elvin | 727 | | |
| Labour | Kenzi Egeh | 669 | | |
| BNP | Jason Douglas | 624 | 16.9 | |
| Turnout | | | 38.4 | |
| Liberal Democrats hold | | Swing | | |
| Liberal Democrats hold | | Swing | | |
| Liberal Democrats hold | | Swing | | |

=== Church End ===
Church End (3)
| Party | Candidate | Votes | % | ±% |
|---|---|---|---|---|
| Liberal Democrats | Richard Hoskins | 1,978 | 55.1 | |
| Liberal Democrats | Hugh Cleaver | 1,912 | | |
| Liberal Democrats | Nicola Sinclair | 1,798 | | |
| Conservative | Mark Dunn | 936 | 26.1 | |
| Conservative | Nigel Colman | 815 | | |
| Conservative | Marie Ebrahimkhan | 770 | | |
| Labour | Beverley Brewer | 350 | 9.8 | |
| Green | Theresa Reynolds | 323 | 9.0 | |
| Labour | Royston Emmett | 295 | | |
| Labour | Taifur Rashid | 248 | | |
| Turnout | | | 42.7 | |
| Liberal Democrats hold | | Swing | | |
| Liberal Democrats hold | | Swing | | |
| Liberal Democrats hold | | Swing | | |

=== Clayhall ===
Clayhall (3)
| Party | Candidate | Votes | % | ±% |
|---|---|---|---|---|
| Conservative | Alan Weinberg | 2,133 | 55.2 | |
| Conservative | Ronald Barden | 2,055 | | |
| Conservative | Robert Cole | 2,055 | | |
| Labour | Thavathuray Jeyaranjan | 1,205 | 31.2 | |
| Labour | Gurdial Singh Bhamra | 1,093 | | |
| Labour | Kumud Joshi | 994 | | |
| Liberal Democrats | Sonia Gable | 526 | 13.6 | |
| Liberal Democrats | Barbara Robertson | 455 | | |
| Liberal Democrats | Gary House | 431 | | |
| Turnout | | | 43.2 | |
| Conservative hold | | Swing | | |
| Conservative hold | | Swing | | |
| Conservative hold | | Swing | | |

=== Clementswood ===
Clementswood (3)
| Party | Candidate | Votes | % | ±% |
|---|---|---|---|---|
| Labour | Simon Green | 1,424 | 53.7 | |
| Labour | Faiz Noor | 1,404 | | |
| Labour | Rajwant Kaur Mahal | 1,298 | | |
| Conservative | George Dunkley | 477 | 18.0 | |
| Conservative | Barbara Wilson | 462 | | |
| Conservative | Christopher Martin | 459 | | |
| British Public Party | Azhar Hussain | 315 | 11.9 | |
| Liberal Democrats | James Budd | 307 | 11.6 | |
| British Public Party | Kashif Rana | 275 | | |
| Liberal Democrats | Matthew Lake | 269 | | |
| British Public Party | Mohammed Intikhab | 244 | | |
| Liberal Democrats | James Swallow | 232 | | |
| Green | Jane Zurek | 129 | 4.9 | |
| Turnout | | | 30.4 | |
| Labour hold | | Swing | | |
| Labour hold | | Swing | | |
| Labour hold | | Swing | | |

=== Cranbrook ===
Cranbrook (3)
| Party | Candidate | Votes | % | ±% |
|---|---|---|---|---|
| Conservative | Ashok Kumar | 1,778 | 52.3 | |
| Conservative | Charles Elliman | 1,625 | | |
| Conservative | Gary Monro | 1,500 | | |
| Labour | Shushila Patel | 1,070 | 31.5 | |
| Labour | Satnam Singh | 1,013 | | |
| Labour | Surinder Pahl | 961 | | |
| Liberal Democrats | Robert Boulton | 551 | 16.2 | |
| Liberal Democrats | Muhammad Niaz | 514 | | |
| Liberal Democrats | Hazel Redshaw | 495 | | |
| Turnout | | | 38.8 | |
| Conservative hold | | Swing | | |
| Conservative hold | | Swing | | |
| Conservative hold | | Swing | | |

=== Fairlop ===
Fairlop (3)
| Party | Candidate | Votes | % | ±% |
|---|---|---|---|---|
| Conservative | Brian Lambert | 1,695 | 48.5 | |
| Conservative | Joyce Ryan | 1,680 | | |
| Conservative | Glenn Corfield | 1,564 | | |
| BNP | Anthony Young | 689 | 19.7 | |
| Labour | David Pearce | 640 | 18.3 | |
| Labour | Elizabeth Pearce | 635 | | |
| Labour | Andrew Walker | 582 | | |
| Liberal Democrats | Catherine Davies | 470 | 13.5 | |
| Liberal Democrats | Belinda Turner | 413 | | |
| Liberal Democrats | Josefa Vargas | 314 | | |
| Turnout | | | 37.4 | |
| Conservative hold | | Swing | | |
| Conservative hold | | Swing | | |
| Conservative hold | | Swing | | |

=== Fullwell ===
Fullwell (3)
| Party | Candidate | Votes | % | ±% |
|---|---|---|---|---|
| Conservative | Ann Candy | 1,885 | 50.4 | |
| Conservative | Harold Moth | 1,859 | | |
| Conservative | Nicholas Hayes | 1,748 | | |
| Labour | Valerie Sproit | 696 | 18.6 | |
| Labour | Christopher Stone | 681 | | |
| Labour | Tanweer Khan | 652 | | |
| Liberal Democrats | Dominic Black | 450 | 12.0 | |
| Liberal Democrats | Sarah Mackie | 404 | | |
| Green | Alan Howe | 379 | 10.1 | |
| UKIP | Nicholas Jones | 329 | 8.8 | |
| Liberal Democrats | Anne Peterson | 321 | | |
| Turnout | | | 38.3 | |
| Conservative hold | | Swing | | |
| Conservative hold | | Swing | | |
| Conservative hold | | Swing | | |

=== Goodmayes ===
Goodmayes (3)
| Party | Candidate | Votes | % | ±% |
|---|---|---|---|---|
| Labour | Satnam Singh | 1,420 | 46.1 | |
| Labour | Vinaya Sharma | 1,392 | | |
| Labour | David Radford | 1,362 | | |
| Liberal Democrats | Azfar Ejaz | 938 | 30.5 | |
| Liberal Democrats | Timothy Hogan | 843 | | |
| Liberal Democrats | Narendra Dattani | 774 | | |
| Conservative | Pauline Hughes | 719 | 23.4 | |
| Conservative | William Madge | 625 | | |
| Conservative | William Streeten | 574 | | |
| Turnout | | | 35.8 | |
| Labour hold | | Swing | | |
| Labour hold | | Swing | | |
| Labour hold | | Swing | | |

=== Hainault ===
Hainault (3)
| Party | Candidate | Votes | % | ±% |
|---|---|---|---|---|
| BNP | Julian Leppert | 1,150 | 31.8 | |
| Conservative | Brian Waite | 1,144 | 31.6 | |
| Conservative | Edward Griffin | 1,127 | | |
| Conservative | Arthur Leggatt | 1,066 | | |
| Labour | Richard Newcombe | 855 | 23.7 | |
| Labour | Lawrence Leaf | 837 | | |
| Labour | Mark Santos | 828 | | |
| Liberal Democrats | Allan Yeoman | 466 | 12.9 | |
| Liberal Democrats | Kathleen Black | 428 | | |
| Liberal Democrats | Patricia Ilett | 358 | | |
| Turnout | | | 38.3 | |
| BNP gain from Labour | | Swing | | |
| Conservative hold | | Swing | | |
| Conservative hold | | Swing | | |

=== Loxford ===
Loxford (3)
| Party | Candidate | Votes | % | ±% |
|---|---|---|---|---|
| Labour | Muhammed Javed | 1,710 | 58.4 | |
| Labour | Faredoon Maravala | 1,608 | | |
| Labour | Julia Hughes | 1,527 | | |
| Liberal Democrats | Ali Qureshi | 464 | 15.8 | |
| Conservative | Irene Dunkley | 431 | 14.7 | |
| Conservative | Sheila Moth | 403 | | |
| Conservative | Morris Hickey | 396 | | |
| Liberal Democrats | Margaret Smith | 358 | | |
| Liberal Democrats | Susan Hamlyn | 340 | | |
| British Public Party | Jamshed Nawaz | 325 | 11.1 | |
| British Public Party | Mohammad Ishtiaq | 208 | | |
| British Public Party | Mohammad Riaz | 188 | | |
| Turnout | | | 30.7 | |
| Labour hold | | Swing | | |
| Labour hold | | Swing | | |
| Labour hold | | Swing | | |

=== Mayfield ===
Mayfield (3)
| Party | Candidate | Votes | % | ±% |
|---|---|---|---|---|
| Labour | Ayodhiya Parkash | 1,530 | 42.7 | |
| Conservative | Robert Whitehall | 1,505 | 42.0 | |
| Conservative | Mark Aaron | 1,495 | | |
| Labour | Pamela Stephenson | 1,450 | | |
| Conservative | Geoffrey Hinds | 1,390 | | |
| Labour | Barbara White | 1,326 | | |
| Liberal Democrats | Ahsan-ul-Haq Chaudry | 549 | 15.3 | |
| Liberal Democrats | Deborah Lake | 524 | | |
| Liberal Democrats | Susan Mann | 480 | | |
| Turnout | | | 40.9 | |
| Labour hold | | Swing | | |
| Conservative hold | | Swing | | |
| Conservative hold | | Swing | | |

=== Monkhams ===
Monkhams (3)
| Party | Candidate | Votes | % | ±% |
|---|---|---|---|---|
| Conservative | Linda Huggett | 2,242 | 64.4 | |
| Conservative | Micheal Stark | 2,208 | | |
| Conservative | James O'Shea | 2,188 | | |
| Liberal Democrats | Anne Crook | 904 | 25.9 | |
| Liberal Democrats | David Cracknell | 797 | | |
| Liberal Democrats | Geoffrey Seeff | 721 | | |
| Labour | Sheila Watkins | 338 | 9.7 | |
| Labour | Om Joshi | 324 | | |
| Labour | Roger Mallach | 308 | | |
| Turnout | | | 43.0 | |
| Conservative hold | | Swing | | |
| Conservative hold | | Swing | | |
| Conservative hold | | Swing | | |

=== Newbury ===
Newbury (3)
| Party | Candidate | Votes | % | ±% |
|---|---|---|---|---|
| Labour | Dev Sharma | 1,753 | 43.7 | |
| Labour | Elaine Norman | 1,567 | | |
| Labour | Kenneth Turner | 1,478 | | |
| Conservative | Surendra Patel | 1,319 | 32.9 | |
| Conservative | Brian Huggett | 1,218 | | |
| Conservative | Timothy Downes | 1,218 | | |
| Liberal Democrats | Colin Mann | 529 | 13.2 | |
| Liberal Democrats | Ann Swallow | 514 | | |
| Liberal Democrats | Mogamat Craayenstein | 435 | | |
| Green | Timothy Randall | 408 | 10.2 | |
| Turnout | | | 38.3 | |
| Labour hold | | Swing | | |
| Labour hold | | Swing | | |
| Labour hold | | Swing | | |

=== Roding ===
Roding (3)
| Party | Candidate | Votes | % | ±% |
|---|---|---|---|---|
| Liberal Democrats | Ian Bond | 1,531 | 43.1 | |
| Liberal Democrats | Felicity Banks | 1,527 | | |
| Liberal Democrats | Farrukh Islam | 1,163 | | |
| Conservative | Anthony Loffhagen | 1,151 | 32.4 | |
| Conservative | Martin Levin | 1,136 | | |
| Conservative | Samuel Morgan | 962 | | |
| Green | Terence Stokes | 453 | 12.7 | |
| Labour | Anne Mallach | 420 | 11.8 | |
| Labour | Mary Tuffin | 414 | | |
| Labour | Richard Wilkins | 388 | | |
| Turnout | | | 40.0 | |
| Liberal Democrats hold | | Swing | | |
| Liberal Democrats hold | | Swing | | |
| Liberal Democrats hold | | Swing | | |

=== Seven Kings ===
Seven Kings (3)
| Party | Candidate | Votes | % | ±% |
|---|---|---|---|---|
| Labour | Harold Bellwood | 1,390 | 45.9 | |
| Labour | Balvinder Saund | 1,297 | | |
| Labour | Robert Littlewood | 1,239 | | |
| Conservative | Beatrice Corfield | 951 | 31.4 | |
| Conservative | Anthony Lenaghan | 829 | | |
| Conservative | Colm Nolan | 797 | | |
| Liberal Democrats | Ghazanfer Ali | 687 | 22.7 | |
| Liberal Democrats | Ram Sharma | 635 | | |
| Liberal Democrats | Leslie Hutchines | 610 | | |
| Turnout | | | 32.0 | |
| Labour hold | | Swing | | |
| Labour hold | | Swing | | |
| Labour hold | | Swing | | |

=== Snaresbrook ===
Snaresbrook (3)
| Party | Candidate | Votes | % | ±% |
|---|---|---|---|---|
| Conservative | Suzanne Nolan | 1,843 | 43.4 | |
| Conservative | Christopher Cummins | 1,823 | | |
| Conservative | Peter Goody | 1,764 | | |
| Labour | Gregor Eglin | 1,223 | 28.8 | |
| Labour | Jagdev Singh Purewal | 1,123 | | |
| Labour | Rachel Voller | 1,117 | | |
| Liberal Democrats | Alison Dreese | 600 | 14.1 | |
| Green | Louise Gunstock | 584 | 13.7 | |
| Liberal Democrats | Claire Hunt | 476 | | |
| Liberal Democrats | John Swallow | 454 | | |
| Turnout | | | 43.9 | |
| Conservative hold | | Swing | | |
| Conservative hold | | Swing | | |
| Conservative hold | | Swing | | |

=== Valentines ===
Valentines (3)
| Party | Candidate | Votes | % | ±% |
|---|---|---|---|---|
| Labour | Nadia Sharif | 1,185 | 29.2 | |
| Labour | Linda Eyre | 1,066 | | |
| Labour | Virendra Tewari | 966 | | |
| Independent | Suresh Kumar | 863 | 21.2 | |
| Conservative | Darshan Sharma | 792 | 19.5 | |
| Conservative | Habib Rehman | 731 | | |
| Conservative | Darshan Singh Sunger | 692 | | |
| Liberal Democrats | George Hogarth | 682 | 16.8 | |
| Liberal Democrats | Sheikh Hussain | 577 | | |
| Liberal Democrats | Farrukh Siddiqi | 483 | | |
| Green | Clive Durdle | 398 | 9.8 | |
| British Public Party | Syed Ali | 142 | 3.5 | |
| British Public Party | Mohammad Afzal | 109 | | |
| Turnout | | | 35.8 | |
| Labour hold | | Swing | | |
| Labour hold | | Swing | | |
| Labour hold | | Swing | | |

=== Wanstead ===
Wanstead (3)
| Party | Candidate | Votes | % | ±% |
|---|---|---|---|---|
| Conservative | Allan Burgess | 1,946 | 42.9 | |
| Conservative | Michelle Dunn | 1,746 | | |
| Conservative | Tak Leung Chan | 1,617 | | |
| Labour | Jeffery Edelman | 1,255 | 27.6 | |
| Labour | Ross Hatfull | 1,066 | | |
| Labour | Nikolai Segura | 956 | | |
| Green | Ashley Gunstock | 810 | 17.8 | |
| Liberal Democrats | Alan Cornish | 528 | 11.6 | |
| Liberal Democrats | Janet Cornish | 526 | | |
| Liberal Democrats | Pamela Winborne | 507 | | |
| Turnout | | | 44.9 | |
| Conservative hold | | Swing | | |
| Conservative hold | | Swing | | |
| Conservative hold | | Swing | | |

== By-elections ==
The following by-elections took place between the 2006 and 2010 elections:

- 2006 Bridge (Redbridge) by-election
- 2006 Clementswood by-election
- 2008 Cranbrook by-election
- 2009 Valentines by-election
- 2009 Wanstead by-election
