= 2022 Redbridge London Borough Council election =

2022 local election in Redbridge

2022 Redbridge Council election
- 5 May 2022

All 63 seats to Redbridge Council 32 seats needed for a majority
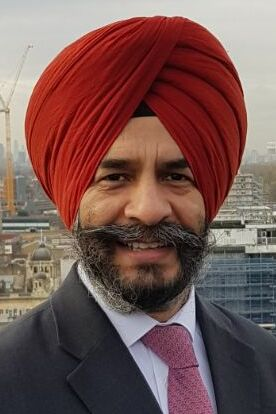

	First party	Second party
Leader	Jas Athwal	Linda Huggett
Party	Labour	Conservative
Last election	51 seats, 58.4%	12 seats, 35.3%
Seats won	58	5
Seat change	▲7	▼7
Popular vote	110,061	61,672
Percentage	58.4%	32.7%
Swing	0.0%	▼2.6%
- 2022 Council election Results by ward
council control before election
Labour
Subsequent council control
TBD

The 2022 Redbridge London Borough Council election took place on 5 May 2022. All 63 members of Redbridge London Borough Council were elected. The elections took place alongside local elections in the other London boroughs and elections to local authorities across the United Kingdom.

In the previous election in 2018, the Labour Party maintained its control of the council, winning 51 out of the 63 seats with the Conservative Party forming the council opposition with the remaining twelve seats.

== Background ==
=== History ===
Result of the 2018 borough election

The thirty-two London boroughs were established in 1965 by the London Government Act 1963. They are the principal authorities in Greater London and have responsibilities including education, housing, planning, highways, social services, libraries, recreation, waste, environmental health and revenue collection. Some of the powers are shared with the Greater London Authority, which also manages passenger transport, police and fire.

Since its formation, Redbridge has generally been under Conservative control or no overall control. The Labour Party won its first majority on the council in the 2014 election, winning 35 seats, while the Conservatives won 25, and the Liberal Democrats won three. In the most recent election in 2018, Labour extended its majority to win 51 seats, with 58.4% of the vote across the borough, while the Conservatives won the remaining 12 seats on 35.3% of the vote.

=== Council term ===
In August 2020, Stuart Bellwood, a Labour councillor for Seven Kings, died. He had served as a councillor since 2002. A Labour councillor for Loxford ward, Chaudhary Mohammed Iqbal, resigned in October 2020 citing health reasons. He was later found guilty of electoral fraud for giving a false address. Due to the COVID-19 pandemic, by-elections for both seats were delayed until 6 May 2021 alongside the 2021 London mayoral election and London Assembly election. Labour held both seats, with Sadhia Warraich winning Loxford and Pushpita Gupta winning Seven Kings.

In April 2021, Robin Turbefield, a Conservative councillor for Bridge ward, defected to Reform UK due to his opposition to lockdown measures in response to COVID-19. In November 2021, Khaled Noor, a councillor for Barkingside, had the Labour whip removed due to his conduct.

== Electoral process ==
Redbridge, like other London borough councils, elects all of its councillors at once every four years. The previous election took place in 2018. The election took place by multi-member first-past-the-post voting, with each ward being represented by two or three councillors. Electors had as many votes as there are councillors to be elected in their ward, with the top two or three being elected.

All registered electors (British, Irish, Commonwealth and European Union citizens) living in London aged 18 or over were entitled to vote in the election. People who lived at two addresses in different councils, such as university students with different term-time and holiday addresses, were entitled to be registered for and vote in elections in both local authorities. Voting in-person at polling stations took place from 7:00 to 22:00 on election day, and voters were able to apply for postal votes or proxy votes in advance of the election.

== Previous council composition ==
Council composition after the 2018 election

Council composition ahead of the 2022 election

After 2018 election		Before 2022 election	
Party	Seats	Party	Seats
Labour	51	Labour	50
Conservative	12	Conservative	11
		Reform	1
		Independent	1

== Results summary ==
2022 Redbridge London Borough Council election
Party	Seats	Gains	Losses	Net gain/loss	Seats %	Votes %	Votes	+/−
Labour	58	7	0	▲7	92.1	58.4	110,061	0.0
Conservative	5	0	7	▼7	7.9	32.7	61,672	▼2.6
Liberal Democrats	0	0	0	0	0.0	4.9	9,305	▲1.2
Green	0	0	0	0	0.0	2.4	4,591	▲0.8
Ind. Network	0	0	0	0	0.0	1.1	2,063	New
TUSC	0	0	0	0	0.0	0.3	568	New
Reform	0	0	0	0	0.0	0.1	274	New

== Ward results ==
Candidates shown below are confirmed candidates. An asterisk * indicates an incumbent Councillor seeking re-election.

=== Aldborough ===
Aldborough (3)
Party	Candidate	Votes	%	±%
Labour	John Howard*	2,038	58.0	▼5.1
Labour	Jyotsna Islam*	1,817	51.8	▼8.8
Labour	Lebo Phakoe	1,664	47.4	▼6.6
Conservative	Richard Firmstone	1,307	37.2	▲8.4
Conservative	Ajit Saha	1,229	35.0	▲6.5
Conservative	Md Hossain	1,175	33.5	▲8.6
Ind. Network	Daniel Adam	293	8.3	New
Liberal Democrats	Michael Teahan	262	7.5	New
Turnout		3,511	34.3	▼5.0
Labour hold		Swing		
Labour hold		Swing		
Labour hold		Swing		

=== Barkingside ===
Barkingside (3)
Party	Candidate	Votes	%	±%
Labour	Judith Garfield*	1,994	50.0	▼2.7
Labour	Martin Sachs*	1,806	45.3	▼5.5
Labour	Mark Santos	1,739	43.6	▼4.8
Conservative	Kartik Parekh	1,609	40.3	▼2.3
Conservative	Daniel Moraru	1,550	38.8	▼1.5
Conservative	Wesley Manta	1,505	37.7	▼2.5
Liberal Democrats	Irfan Mustafa	380	9.5	New
Ind. Network	Riaz Bhatti	375	9.4	New
Turnout		3,990	37.4	▼6.9
Labour hold		Swing		
Labour hold		Swing		
Labour hold		Swing		

=== Bridge ===
Bridge (3)
Party	Candidate	Votes	%	±%
Labour	Syeda Choudhury	1,470	36.8	▼5.0
Labour	Gurdial Bhamra	1,454	36.4	▼8.9
Conservative	Paul Canal*	1,351	33.9	▼15.4
Labour	Kamal Qureshi	1,343	33.7	▼10.4
Conservative	Has Ahmed	1,265	31.7	▼17.0
Conservative	Sheree Rackham	1,224	30.7	▼14.9
Green	Rachel Collinson	564	14.1	▲1.1
Liberal Democrats	Claire Hunt	354	8.9	New
Reform	Alex Wilson	274	6.9	New
Liberal Democrats	Christopher Pallet	255	6.4	New
Turnout		3,991	35.5	▼2.7
Labour gain from Conservative		Swing		
Labour gain from Conservative		Swing		
Conservative hold		Swing		

=== Chadwell ===
Chadwell (3)
Party	Candidate	Votes	%	±%
Labour	Hannah Chaudhry*	1,928	62.2	▲3.0
Labour	Bert Jones*	1,802	58.1	▲3.7
Labour	Anne Sachs*	1,782	57.5	▲1.7
Conservative	Shirley Baah-Mensah	847	27.3	▲0.3
Conservative	Katherine Egbun	809	26.1	▲2.0
Conservative	Raj Forhad	741	23.9	▲0.2
Green	John Tyne	532	17.2	▲7.7
Turnout		3,101	28.8	▼5.2
Labour hold		Swing		
Labour hold		Swing		
Labour hold		Swing		

=== Churchfields ===
Churchfields (3)
Party	Candidate	Votes	%	±%
Labour	Rosa Gomez*	2,173	44.6	▲7.0
Labour	Lloyd Duddridge	2,064	42.4	▲9.3
Labour	Guy Williams	1,777	36.5	▲5.2
Conservative	Stephen Adams*	1,679	34.5	▼4.5
Conservative	Robert Cole	1,567	32.2	▼6.5
Conservative	Garry Sukhija	1,487	30.5	▼6.9
Liberal Democrats	Ash Holder	827	17.0	▼7.8
Liberal Democrats	Martin Rosner	784	16.1	▼7.4
Liberal Democrats	Mohammed Uddin	682	14.0	▼6.5
Green	Judith Roads	360	7.4	New
Green	Ruairi Mulhern	330	6.8	New
Green	Francis Roads	312	6.4	New
Turnout		4,873	45.7	▲2.5
Labour gain from Conservative		Swing		
Labour gain from Conservative		Swing		
Labour hold		Swing		

=== Clayhall ===
Clayhall (3)
Party	Candidate	Votes	%	±%
Labour	Prabjit Gurm	1,924	54.8	▲1.2
Labour	Kabir Mahmud	1,804	51.4	▼4.6
Labour	Jamal Uddin*	1,780	50.7	▼0.8
Conservative	Saravanan Muthusamy	1,322	37.6	▼4.3
Conservative	Dave Croft	1,267	36.1	▼0.8
Conservative	Muhammed Khan	1,190	33.9	▼1.4
Liberal Democrats	Kathleen Teahan	383	10.9	▲6.7
Turnout		3,513	35.2	▼15.4
Labour hold		Swing		
Labour hold		Swing		
Labour hold		Swing		

=== Clementswood ===
Clementswood (3)
Party	Candidate	Votes	%	±%
Labour	Helen Coomb*	1,986	80.4	▲0.8
Labour	Muhammed Javed*	1,926	78.0	▲1.8
Labour	Zulfiqar Hussain*	1,911	77.4	▲2.1
Conservative	Matthew Cole	401	16.2	▼0.4
Conservative	George Dunkley	351	14.2	▼0.6
Conservative	Bradley Langer	341	13.8	▼4.3
Turnout		2,469	27.7	▼5.6
Labour hold				
Labour hold				
Labour hold				

=== Cranbrook ===
Cranbrook (3)
Party	Candidate	Votes	%	±%
Labour	Chaudhary Ahmed*	1,746	63.4	▲3.1
Labour	Syed Islam	1,574	57.2	▼0.3
Labour	Saira Jamil	1,638	59.5	▲5.9
Conservative	Mosheraf Ashraf	809	29.4	▼14.5
Conservative	Abrar Khan	793	28.8	▼4.5
Conservative	Ekam Sehmbi	781	28.4	▼4.9
Ind. Network	Fathima Shukry	323	11.7	New
Turnout		2,754	29.4	▼12.4
Labour hold				
Labour hold				
Labour hold				

=== Fairlop ===
Fairlop (3)
Party	Candidate	Votes	%	±%
Conservative	Ruth Clark*	1,657	47.6	▼7.9
Conservative	Joyce Ryan*	1,626	46.7	▼7.9
Labour	Bob Chattaway	1,616	46.4	▲6.7
Conservative	Howard Berlin*	1,608	46.2	▼9.3
Labour	Sareena Sanger	1,498	43.0	▲7.6
Labour	Mazhar Saleem	1,377	39.5	▲6.0
Liberal Democrats	Joel Winston	330	9.5	▲2.5
Turnout		3,483	34.5	▼2.7
Conservative hold				
Conservative hold				
Labour gain from Conservative				

=== Fullwell ===
Fullwell (3)
Party	Candidate	Votes	%	±%
Labour	Matthew Goddin	2,105	57.2	▲2.4
Labour	Shanell Johnson	2,016	54.7	▲6.8
Labour	Sham Islam*	1,902	51.7	▲1.9
Conservative	Vicky Foster	1,480	40.2	▲2.3
Conservative	Denys Phillips	1,365	37.1	▼0.6
Conservative	Sk Hossain	1,323	36.0	▲2.2
Turnout		3,680	32.9	▼7.7
Labour hold				
Labour hold				
Labour hold				

=== Goodmayes ===
Goodmayes (3)
Party	Candidate	Votes	%	±%
Labour	Namreen Chaudry*	1,747	70.6	▼3.5
Labour	Kam Rai*	1,711	69.1	▼2.2
Labour	Neil Zammett*	1,601	64.7	▼4.5
Conservative	Shazia Anjum	552	22.3	▲1.0
Conservative	Dwendoline Dodkins	538	21.7	▲1.6
Conservative	Fazle Elahi	465	18.8	▼1.1
Turnout		2,475	25.1	▼7.8
Labour hold				
Labour hold				
Labour hold				

=== Hainault ===
Hainault (3)
Party	Candidate	Votes	%	±%
Labour	Sam Gould	1,764	50.7	▲0.6
Labour	Shah Ali	1,633	46.9	▼7.9
Labour	Luthfa Rahman	1,578	45.3	▼6.9
Conservative	Donna Baker	1,510	43.4	▼2.4
Conservative	Glen Haywood	1,490	42.8	▲2.2
Conservative	Caroline Porter	1,448	41.6	▲1.5
Ind. Network	Sam Ali	243	7.0	New
Turnout		3,480	32.9	▼2.5
Labour hold				
Labour hold				
Labour hold				

=== Ilford Town ===
Ilford Town (2)
Party	Candidate	Votes	%	±%
Labour	Syeda Ahmed*	1,393	73.2	▼0.1
Labour	Shoaib Patel*	1,329	69.9	▼2.0
Conservative	Karen Packer	436	22.9	▲12.3
Conservative	Dee Datta	398	20.9	▲13.2
Turnout		1,902	26.7	▼9.1
Labour hold				
Labour hold				

=== Loxford ===
Loxford (3)
Party	Candidate	Votes	%	±%
Labour	Foyzur Rahman	1,860	77.7	▼1.8
Labour	Sahdia Warraich*	1,754	73.3	▼1.6
Labour	Taifur Rashid*	1,740	72.7	▲1.6
Conservative	Michael Speakman	434	18.1	▲2.6
Conservative	Sajda Begum	372	15.5	▲0.1
Conservative	Uday Manchu	354	14.8	▲0.4
Turnout		2,393	26.2	▼5.5
Labour hold				
Labour hold				
Labour hold				

=== Mayfield ===
Mayfield
Party	Candidate	Votes	%	±%
Labour	Jas Athwal*	2,349	76.1	▼0.0
Labour	Tanweer Khan	2,148	69.6	▼3.3
Labour	Vanisha Solanki*	2,125	68.9	▼1.8
Conservative	Carol Corbin	525	17.0	▼4.7
Conservative	Maria Begum	470	15.2	▼6.1
Conservative	Masood Pasha	360	11.7	▼5.6
Liberal Democrats	Sufia Khanam	229	7.4	New
Ind. Network	Majad Hussain	218	7.1	New
Turnout		3,086	30.3	▼4.8
Registered electors		10,196		
Labour hold				
Labour hold				
Labour hold				

=== Monkhams ===
Monkhams (2)
Party	Candidate	Votes	%	±%
Conservative	Linda Huggett*	1,694	57.6	▼8.2
Conservative	Joel Herga	1,658	56.4	▼10.1
Labour	Gregor Eglin	929	31.6	▲12.8
Labour	Kashif Qayyum	826	28.0	▲9.8
Liberal Democrats	Heather Liddle	368	12.5	▲0.8
Liberal Democrats	Andrew Vanezis	244	8.3	▲1.6
Turnout		2,942	40.7	▼1.4
Conservative hold				
Conservative hold				

=== Newbury ===
Newbury
Party	Candidate	Votes	%	±%
Labour	Sunny Brar	1,957	64.5	▲7.5
Labour	Thavathuray Jeyaranjan*	1,916	63.1	▲5.2
Labour	Niki Chahal	1,907	62.8	▲6.3
Conservative	Krishna Bandaru	781	25.7	▼5.7
Conservative	Maureen Ashley	762	25.1	▼0.4
Conservative	Swapna Kalsi	745	24.5	▼2.0
Liberal Democrats	Andrew Eracleous	293	9.7	New
Turnout		3,035	31.2	▼9.8
Labour hold				
Labour hold				
Labour hold				

=== Seven Kings ===
Seven Kings (3)
Party	Candidate	Votes	%	±%
Labour	Pushpita Gupta	1,707	62.8	▼14.8
Labour	Nav Johal	1,705	62.8	▼9.2
Labour	Sadiq Kothia	1,609	59.2	▼14.8
TUSC	Andy Walker	568	20.9	New
Conservative	Aamer Hamid	515	19.0	▼1.8
Conservative	Avtar Sehmbi	471	17.3	▼0.0
Conservative	Kunle Olaifa	420	15.5	▼1.7
Ind. Network	Sajida Ugradar	316	11.6	New
Turnout		2,716	27.5	▼7.5
Labour hold				
Labour hold				
Labour hold				

=== South Woodford ===
South Woodford (3)
Party	Candidate	Votes	%	±%
Labour	Beverley Brewer*	1,941	49.5	▲11.3
Labour	Joe Hehir*	1,685	42.9	▲7.0
Labour	Saiqa Hussain	1,641	41.8	▲7.3
Conservative	Suzanne Nolan*	1,496	38.1	▼0.6
Conservative	Preeti Rana	1,402	35.7	▼3.5
Conservative	Shafi Choudhury	1,343	34.2	▼3.4
Green	Tony Csoka	457	11.6	▲1.8
Liberal Democrats	Gwyneth Deakins	443	11.3	▼6.4
Liberal Democrats	Ian Gardiner	398	10.1	▼5.2
Green	Robert Sheldon	297	7.6	▼0.9
Liberal Democrats	Ian Morley	238	6.1	▼8.3
Turnout		3,925	43.5	▼0.1
Labour hold				
Labour gain from Conservative				
Labour gain from Conservative				

=== Valentines ===
Valentines
Party	Candidate	Votes	%	±%
Labour	Khayer Chowdhury*	1,833	69.2	▼3.0
Labour	Alex Holmes	1,775	67.1	▼3.5
Labour	Kumud Joshi	1,645	62.1	▼3.5
Conservative	Stephanie Burtt	613	23.2	▲0.2
Conservative	Richard Jackson	563	21.2	▲1.1
Conservative	Michael Bajomo	505	19.1	▲6.0
Ind. Network	Max Reid	295	11.1	▲5.5
Turnout		2,646	26.0	▼5.6
Labour hold				
Labour hold				
Labour hold				

=== Wanstead Park ===
Wanstead Park
Party	Candidate	Votes	%	±%
Labour	Sheila Bain*	1,541	58.1	▼2.0
Labour	Bayo Alaba	1,463	55.2	▼0.6
Conservative	Duncan McWatt	560	21.1	▼12.1
Green	Ashley Gunstock	548	20.7	New
Conservative	Zak Vora	490	18.5	▼12.8
Liberal Democrats	Janet Cornish	296	11.2	▲0.2
Liberal Democrats	David Bruck	200	7.5	New
Turnout		2,651	44.8	▲3.5
Labour hold				
Labour hold				

=== Wanstead Village ===
Wanstead Village
Party	Candidate	Votes	%	±%
Labour	Jo Blackman*	2,058	50.4	▲4.1
Labour	Paul Donovan*	1,817	44.5	▼0.1
Labour	Daniel Morgan-Thomas*	1,713	42.0	▲1.3
Conservative	Gavin Chambers	958	23.5	▼17.0
Conservative	Fatema Hussain	863	21.1	▼18.3
Liberal Democrats	Crispin Acton	841	20.6	▲11.5
Conservative	Sharn Kalsi	822	20.1	▼18.7
Liberal Democrats	Neil Hepworth	804	19.7	▲11.6
Liberal Democrats	Scott Wilding	694	17.0	New
Green	Susanne Marshall	504	12.3	▲1.3
Green	Richard Lafferty	394	9.7	▲2.8
Green	John Rowlands	293	7.2	▲0.4
Turnout		4,082	42.7	▼1.8
Labour hold				
Labour hold				
Labour hold				

== Changes 2022-2026 ==
=== By-elections ===
==== Wanstead Park ====
Wanstead Park by-election: 14 November 2024
Party	Candidate	Votes	%	±%
Labour	Emma Shepherd-Mallinson	934	46.9	–5.4
Conservative	Daniel Moraru	349	17.5	–1.5
Independent	Sharula Kangle	284	14.2	N/A
Green	Syed Siddiqi	222	11.1	–7.5
Liberal Democrats	Neil Hepworth	109	5.5	–4.6
Reform	Raj Forhad	95	4.8	N/A
Majority		585	29.4	N/A
Turnout		2,000	33.2	–11.6
Registered electors		6,021		
Labour hold		Swing	▼2.0	

==== Mayfield ====
Mayfield by-election: 27 March 2025
Party	Candidate	Votes	%	±%
Redbridge Ind.	Noor Begum	1,080	42.5	N/A
Labour	Mazhar Saleem	663	26.1	–44.6
Conservative	Robin Thakur	494	19.4	+3.6
Reform	Paul Luggeri	121	4.8	N/A
Liberal Democrats	Neil Hepworth	100	3.9	–3.0
Green	Nadir Gilani	85	3.3	N/A
Majority		417	16.4	N/A
Turnout		2,549	24.7	–5.6
Registered electors		10,342		
Redbridge Ind. gain from Labour				

==== Hainault ====
The by-election took place on 1 May 2025, following the resignation of Sam Gould.

Hainault by-election: 1 May 2025
Party	Candidate	Votes	%	±%
Labour	Helen Mullis	835	28.8	
Independent	Glen Haywood	834	28.8	
Reform	Raj Forhad	611	21.1	
Conservative	Teresa Blohm	421	14.5	
Green	Nirojan Raveendralingam	125	4.3	
Liberal Democrats	Cathy Davies	73	2.5	
Turnout				
Labour hold				
