= Preselection =

Process for selecting candidates prior to a public election

Preselection is the process by which a candidate is selected, usually by a political party, to contest an election for political office. It is also referred to as candidate selection. It is a fundamental function of political parties. The preselection process may involve the party's executive or leader selecting a candidate or be some contested process. In countries that adopt Westminster-style responsible government, preselection is also the first step on the path to a position in the executive. The selected candidate is commonly referred to as the party's endorsed candidate.

Deselection or disendorsement is the opposite procedure, when the political party withdraws its support from one of its elected office-holders. The party may then select a replacement candidate at the subsequent election, or it may decide (or be compelled by the electoral timetable) to forgo contesting that seat (for example, the Liberal Party of Australia after Pauline Hanson was disendorsed just before the 1996 House of Representatives election, and likewise the Labour candidate for Moray, Stuart Maclennan, just before the 2010 UK general election). The deselected representative is usually free to still contest the election as an Independent or as a representative of another party, though they are usually at high risk of being unseated.

Reselection is the procedure of requiring candidates to repeat the preselection process to retain the party's support.

An example of a preselection procedure that gains extensive media coverage is the selection of candidates for President of the United States, referred to by one observer as "the wildest democratic political bazaar in the world". These are generally known as presidential primaries, but are actually a combination of primary elections, in which voters in a jurisdiction select candidates, and caucuses, in which candidates are selected by a narrower (but still potentially large) group of party members.

In other countries, a wide variety of preselection systems exist, though the majority involve members of a political party or party executive playing a role in selecting candidates to compete in elections.

== Definition ==
In politics, the preselection process is the process by which candidates who are members of a political party are selected by that party to contest an election for political office. It is a fundamental function of political parties, affecting 'representation, party cohesion, legislative behaviour and democratic stability.' In countries that adopt Westminster-style responsible government, preselection is also the first step on the path to a position in the executive.

In Australia, the term has been in common usage since the 1920s to describe the selection of candidates by political parties for public office. One usage of the term is in describing elected public officeholders in Westminster type party systems as being selected by the voters after being preselected by their parties. It derives from Australian Labor Party preselection practices that were widely used by that party before 1955. These involved a two step process of a preselection ballot or plebiscite of party members and affiliated trade unionists in the electorate being contested, and endorsement, which was normally a formality, by the state executive. The ALP, as well as in some states the Liberal Party, now uses a system in which votes in the plebiscite are combined with votes from delegates selected by the party organisation.

== Variables in the preselection process ==
Preselection can occur in a wide variety of ways, but four main variables characterise the range of systems:

- Eligibility to stand
- Membership of the preselecting body
- System used by the body to make the choice
- Additional rules determining composition of candidates as a group.

In each case, it is possible to assess the variables on a scale from "open" to "closed" or from "inclusive" to "exclusive".

=== Eligibility to stand ===
Eligibility to be a candidate in preselection is frequently bound by rules set by a political party.

Preselection may also be affected by a jurisdiction's electoral system. In Indonesia, for example, there is a system of public and administrative scrutiny of draft candidate lists. This may include examination of issues such as personal character or internal party issues, and lead to candidates being eliminated.

=== Membership of the preselecting body ===
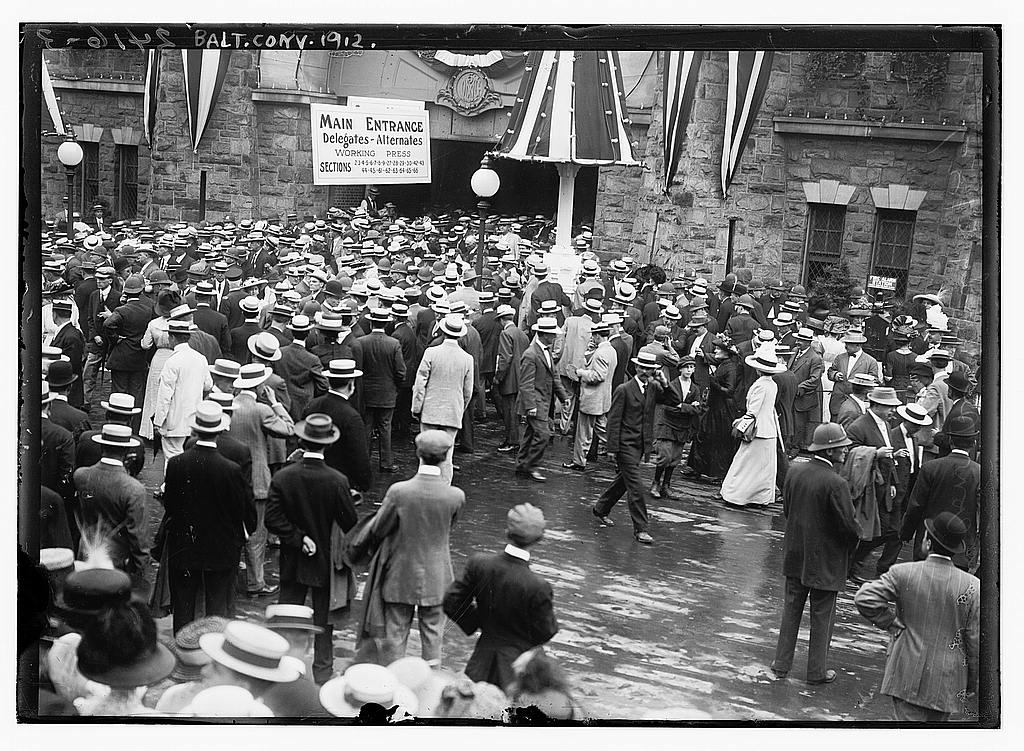
Delegates to the historically significant 1912 Democratic National Convention

The bodies that most commonly preselect candidates for political office (the selectors or "selectorate") are party members or party organisations such as a party executive or candidate selection committee. However, the selectors may be a broader group such as all voters or registered voters (as in some United States primary elections). Alternatively, there may be a more restricted group of selectors or selection may, in rare cases, be undertaken by an individual, such as a party leader.

=== System used by the body to make the choice ===
Preselection may take place by a system of voting by the selectors (examples include United States primaries and most major Australian political party preselections), or there may be a system of appointment, such as through decision by a selection committee.

=== Additional rules governing preselection ===
Some preselections are governed by additional rules that may serve to ensure a particular composition amongst candidates as a whole, or to facilitate other party objectives such as decentralisation of decision-making. In several countries including Australia and Canada, candidate selection is normally conducted by internal party processes at the constituency or electorate level. However it can be possible for a regional or national party body or leader to intervene to ensure a particular candidate is preselected, and there may be party rules governing the composition of the body of candidates as a whole that may require modification of preselection processes or outcomes, such as to implement policies directed toward gender balance. Gender balance objectives have been set by the Australian Labor Party and the German Social Democratic Party. In Belgium, the Belgian Christian Social party set rules aimed at ensuring balanced preselection of Flemish and Francophone candidates.

In the ACT Liberal party in Australia, candidates for the 2016 election were required to pay a A$3,500 "nomination fee". There were 25 nominations for five seats. In Australia, public office-holders are required to resign those offices before nominating at a preselection. For example, the Australian Human Rights Commissioner, Tim Wilson, resigned that office in February 2016 before nominating for the Liberal Party.

== Preselection controversies and scandals ==
Preselection within all major Australian political parties has been the subject of accounts of "branch stacking" and abuse of process. While affecting both major parties, the Australian Labor Party was most severely affected in the state of Queensland, in incidents that led to the resignation of three members of the Queensland Parliament. The resignations were related to allegations or admissions of electoral fraud resulting from attempts to "branch stack": to bring supporters into a party branch or electorate to assist a candidate in their bid to win party preselection.

== See also ==
- Prospective parliamentary candidate (UK)
- Presidential nominee (US)
- Deselection of Labour MPs (UK)
