= Deselection of Labour MPs =

UK political process

Deselection in the UK Labour Party is the process by which support for an MP is withdrawn by their local party meaning that the MP is unable to stand in a forthcoming general election with the support of the party.

== Rules governing deselection ==
To some MPs the Labour Party, to which they owe everything, becomes an inconvenient pressure group – except at election times when grudging lip-service has to be paid to the Labour manifesto. Reselection must be used to make clear to MPs that this elevated view of their role has had its day. Labour MPs have no rights more or less than the ordinary card carrying Party members. They are simply the party members to whom has fallen the honour of giving practical expression to the ideals of the Labour movement.

— Chris Mullin & Charlotte Atkins, How To Select or Reselect your MP,

Labour Party rules specify that MPs will face a "trigger ballot" procedure where each branch of the Constituency Labour Party (CLP) and each affiliate (trade union and socialist society) branch will have a simple majority vote on whether they wish their sitting MP to automatically stand again in the next general election, or whether they wish to have a full selection process.

If one third or more of party or affiliate branches vote for a full selection then the sitting MP will face a vote of all party members to decide whether they want their existing MP, or an alternative candidate to represent them at the next election.

== History of deselection rules ==
=== Before 1970 ===
Before 1970 the process for reconsidering support for a sitting MP required three Constituency General Committee (GC) meetings to be called for the purpose of considering whether to support the MP, followed by a meeting of affiliates to the CLP where affiliate GC delegates were mandated to vote a certain way. If the local party sought to remove their MP the MP could then appeal this decision to the NEC.

The NEC was at this time controlled by the right of the Labour Party and almost invariably sided with the sitting MP and against the Constituency Party. The NEC threatened to disband some CLPs which sought to change their Labour MP.

=== 1970–1979 ===
The rules governing reselection were amended at Labour Party Conference in 1970 making it marginally less difficult to challenge a sitting MP. Dropping the required number of GC meetings from three to two and removing the mandating of affiliate GC delegates.

The Campaign for Labour Party Democracy (CLPD), founded in 1973, was set up by left wing Labour activists to organise for greater democratic representation within the Labour Party. CLPD spent the next six years organising to seek to win a rule change at Labour Party Conference to create an automatic reselection procedure for each sitting Labour MP.

At Labour Party Conference in 1974 the NEC reported that they had conducted a review of the rules and concluded that no changes were required. Ken Coates moved a motion to seek automatic selection at this conference which was defeated. Although CLPs submitted motions in 1975 and 1976 calling for an automatic selection procedure to be introduced these were ruled out of order on the grounds that they breached the 'three year rule'.

67 CLPs submitted motions calling for automatic reselection to the 1977 conference. These motions were ruled out of order on the grounds that they breached the '1968 rule' However, Ian Mikardo announced on behalf of the NEC that "We shall put down at next year's Annual Conference all the amendments to the constitution necessary to provide automatic reselection in the way and in the sense that the sponsors of those sixty-odd resolutions want. I do not think there is the least chance of the Executive reneging on that undertaking."

At Labour Party Conference in 1978 the NEC broke this commitment and did not bring forward the proposal for automatic reselection. CLPD organised for a motion on automatic reselection to be voted on. The Amalgamated Engineering Union (AUEW) delegates had democratically agreed to support the CLPD motion however when it came to the vote the AUEW's then president, Hugh Scanlon, voted against the CLPD motion, and it was narrowly defeated. Following an intensive 12-month organising campaign by CLPD, at Labour Party Conference in 1979 a CLPD motion for automatic reselection was passed.

Gavin Strang MP suggested that one of the consequences of the introduction of mandatory reselection was that MPs spent more time in their constituencies, saying "it's far more the normal thing now to have an office in the constituency, to employ someone there, and to live in the constituency. Reselection has turned MPs into better campaigners for the local party."

=== 1979–present ===
In 1990 Neil Kinnock, then leader of the Labour Party, scrapped mandatory reselection, replacing it with a system of trigger ballots.

Changes to make deselection of Labour MPs easier, by lowering the number of branches that have to vote to trigger a contest from 50% to 33%, were passed by a large majority at Labour's 2018 Party Conference. However, the proposal made by a number of CLPs for open selections was not permitted to go to a vote, leading to criticism from Momentum who described the changes as "meager" with "key proposals being watered down".

No Labour MPs were deselected during the leadership of Ed Miliband or the leadership of Jeremy Corbyn.

In February 2022, it was reported that Jeremy Corbyn was close to being deselected. In October 2022, Sam Tarry became the first MP to be deselected since 2010. He was beaten by leader of Redbridge London Borough Council Jas Athwal. Tarry questioned the integrity of the election, citing the electronic voting system that was used to count the votes.

== List of deselected Labour MPs ==
Name of MP	Year	Constituency	Leader	Notes
Evan Davies	1929	Ebbw Vale	Ramsay MacDonald	
Jack Kinley	1955	Bootle	Clement Attlee	
S. O. Davies	1970	Merthyr Tydfil	Harold Wilson	Won re-election as an independent
Dick Taverne	1972	Lincoln	Harold Wilson	Resigned to force a by-election which he won as "Democratic Labour"
Eddie Milne	1973	Blyth	Harold Wilson	
Edward Griffiths	1974	Sheffield Brightside	Harold Wilson	
Reg Prentice	1975	Newham North East	Harold Wilson	Subsequently defected to the Conservatives.
Frank Tomney	1976	Hammersmith North	James Callaghan	
Arthur Irvine	1977	Liverpool Edge Hill	James Callaghan	
Ben Ford	1981	Bradford North	Michael Foot	
Eric Ogden	1981	Liverpool West Derby	Michael Foot	Subsequently defected to the Social Democratic Party.
Raymond Fletcher	1981	Ilkeston	Michael Foot	
Fred Mulley	1982	Sheffield Park	Michael Foot	
Stan Cohen	1983	Leeds South East	Michael Foot	
Frank Hooley	1983	Sheffield Heeley	Michael Foot	
John Sever	1983	Birmingham Ladywood	Michael Foot	
Arthur Lewis	1983	Newham North West	Michael Foot	
Michael Cocks	1985	Bristol South	Neil Kinnock	
Norman Atkinson	1985	Tottenham	Neil Kinnock	
John Forrester	1986	Stoke-on-Trent North	Neil Kinnock	
Michael McGuire	1987	Makerfield	Neil Kinnock	
Ernie Roberts	1987	Hackney North and Stoke Newington	Neil Kinnock	
Alec Woodall	1987	Hemsworth	Neil Kinnock	
John Hughes	1989	Coventry North East	Neil Kinnock	
Sydney Bidwell	1991	Ealing Southall	Neil Kinnock	
Ron Brown	1990	Edinburgh Leith	Neil Kinnock	
David Young	1994	Bolton South East	Tony Blair	
Max Madden	1997	Bradford West	Tony Blair	
Jane Griffiths	2004	Reading East	Tony Blair	
Bob Wareing	2007	Liverpool West Derby	Gordon Brown	
Frank Cook	2008	Stockton North	Gordon Brown	
Anne Moffat	2010	East Lothian	Gordon Brown	
Sam Tarry	2022	Ilford South	Keir Starmer	
Mick Whitley	2023	Birkenhead	Keir Starmer	
Beth Winter	2023	Cynon Valley	Keir Starmer	For selection to represent Merthyr Tydfil and Aberdare
Lloyd Russell-Moyle	2024	Brighton Kemptown	Keir Starmer	

This list does not include MPs who successfully overturned a vote to deselect them at the NEC.

Labour MPs deselected under each leader since 1970
Labour leader	Portrait	Years as leader	Number of MPs deselected during leadership
Harold Wilson		1963–1976	5
James Callaghan		1976–1980	2
Michael Foot		1980–1983	8
Neil Kinnock		1983–1992	9
John Smith		1992–1994	0
Tony Blair		1994–2007	3
Gordon Brown		2007–2010	3
Ed Miliband		2010–2015	0
Jeremy Corbyn		2015–2020	0
Keir Starmer		2020–2026	4
Andy Burnham		2026–present	0

== See also ==
- Campaign for Labour Party Democracy
