= Wanstead Park (ward) =

- Electoral ward for the Redbridge London Borough Council
- Wanstead Park ward boundaries since 2018
- Borough: Redbridge
- County: Greater London
- Population: 8,063 (2021)
- Electorate: 5,917 (2022)
- Major settlements: Aldersbrook
- Area: 4.265 square kilometres (1.647 sq mi)

Current electoral ward
- Created: 2018
- Number of members: 2
- Councillors: Sheila Bain; Emma Shepherd-Mallinson
- Created from: Cranbrook, Valentines, Wanstead
- GSS code: E05011254

Wanstead Park is an electoral ward in the London Borough of Redbridge. The ward was first used in the 2018 elections. It returns two councillors to Redbridge London Borough Council.

== List of councillors ==
Term	Councillor	Party
2018–present	Sheila Bain	Labour
2018–2022	Paul Merry	Labour
2022–2024	Bayo Alaba	Labour
2024–present	Emma Shepherd-Mallinson	Labour

== Redbridge council elections ==
=== 2024 by-election ===
The by-election took place on 14 November 2024, following the resignation of Bayo Alaba.

2024 Wanstead Park by-election
Party	Candidate	Votes	%	±%
Labour	Emma Shepherd-Mallinson	934		
Conservative	Daniel Moraru	349		
Independent	Sharula Kangle	284		
Green	Syed Siddiqi	222		
Liberal Democrats	Neil Hepworth	109		
Reform UK	Raj Forhad	95		
Turnout				
Labour hold		Swing		

=== 2022 election ===
The election took place on 5 May 2022.

2022 Redbridge London Borough Council election: Wanstead Park (2)
Party	Candidate	Votes	%	±%
Labour	Sheila Bain	1,541	58.1	▼2.0
Labour	Bayo Alaba	1,463	55.2	▼0.6
Conservative	Duncan McWatt	560	21.1	▼12.1
Green	Ashley Gunstock	548	20.7	New
Conservative	Zak Vora	490	18.5	▼12.8
Liberal Democrats	Janet Cornish	296	11.2	▲0.2
Liberal Democrats	David Bruck	200	7.5	New
Turnout		2,651	44.8	▲3.5
Labour hold				
Labour hold				

=== 2018 election ===
The election took place on 3 May 2018.

2018 Redbridge London Borough Council election: Wanstead Park (2)
Party	Candidate	Votes	%	±%
Labour	Sheila Bain	1,766	60.07	N/A
Labour	Paul Merry	1,641	55.82	N/A
Conservative	Pat Bennett	976	33.20	N/A
Conservative	Richard Kays	919	31.26	N/A
Liberal Democrats	Christopher Pallet	322	10.95	N/A
Turnout		2,940	48.27	
Labour win (new seat)				
Labour win (new seat)				
