= Sam Tarry =

British Labour politician, MP for Ilford South

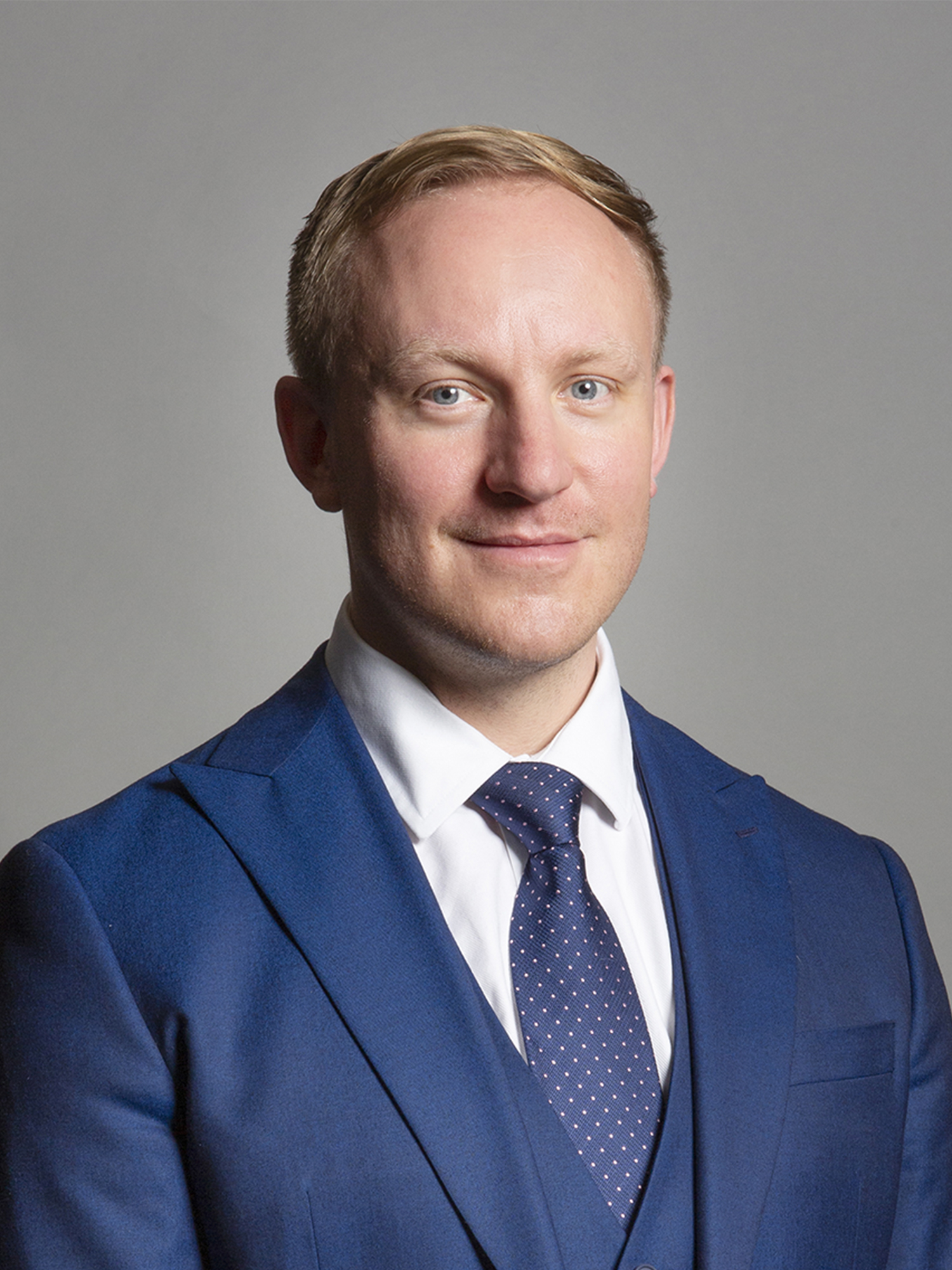
- Official portrait, 2019

Shadow Minister for Buses and Local Transport
- In office 7 January 2021 – 27 July 2022
- Leader: Keir Starmer
- Preceded by: Matt Rodda
- Succeeded by: Simon Lightwood

Member of Parliament for Ilford South
- In office 12 December 2019 – 30 May 2024
- Preceded by: Mike Gapes
- Succeeded by: Jas Athwal

Member of Barking and Dagenham London Borough Council for Chadwell Heath
- In office 6 May 2010 – 3 May 2018

Personal details
- Born: Samuel Peter Tarry; 27 August 1982 (age 44) Westminster, London, England
- Party: Labour
- Other political affiliations: Socialist Campaign Group (2019–2024)
- Spouse: Julia Fozard (m. 2016, separated)
- Domestic partner: Angela Rayner (2022–2023, 2025–current)
- Children: 2
- Education: University College London

Samuel Peter Tarry (/ˈtɑːri/; born 27 August 1982) is a British former politician who was the Labour Party Member of Parliament (MP) for Ilford South from 2019 until 2024. He was a member of the Socialist Campaign Group parliamentary caucus. On 10 October 2022, he was deselected by the Ilford South Constituency Labour Party as its candidate for the next general election.

== Early life and career ==
Samuel Tarry was born on 27 August 1982 in Westminster. The eldest son of The Revd Canon Gordon Tarry, a Church of England clergyman, he grew up on St Andrews Road and attended Highlands Primary School in Ilford. His family later moved to Seven Kings, and Tarry completed his secondary education at St Edward's Church of England School in Romford. Tarry later studied at University College London.

== Political career ==
From 2009 to 2011, Tarry was the chair of Young Labour, the youth wing of the Labour Party. Tarry went on to be active in anti-fascism, including working as a community organiser for Hope not Hate.

Tarry was a Labour Party councillor for Chadwell Heath ward, in the London Borough of Barking and Dagenham, from 2010 to 2018. Tarry was criticised for allegedly living in his home in Brighton, which is 70 miles away from his then council seat in Barking and Dagenham. He was investigated by police for electoral fraud in relation to this matter, and was cleared by the police investigation, as he was found to own a second home in Barking and Dagenham, and therefore was legally resident in Barking and Dagenham at the time of his election.

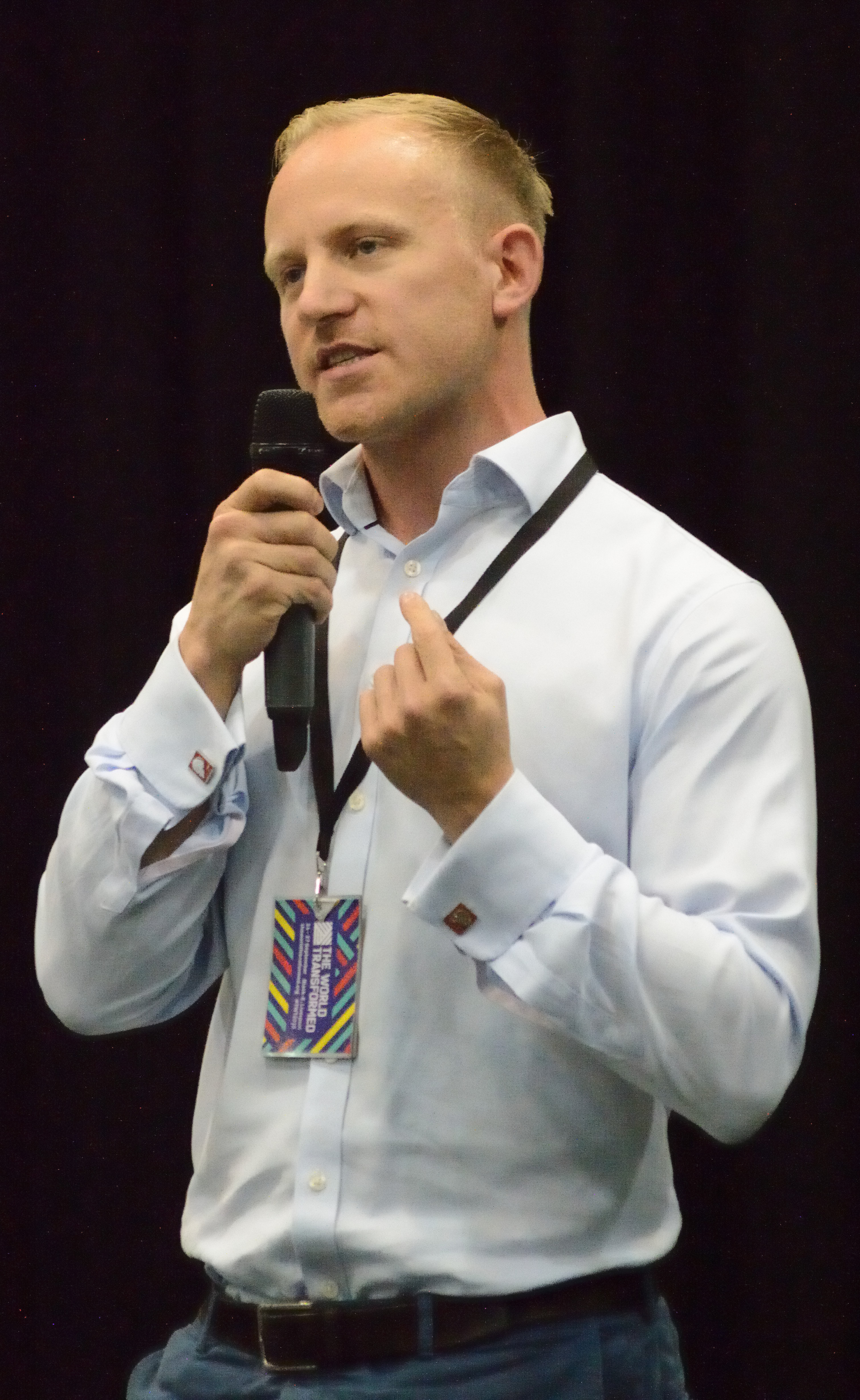
Tarry speaking in 2016

In 2016, Tarry worked under Jon Lansman's supervision as a director of Jeremy Corbyn's successful Labour Party leadership campaign.

He subsequently worked as the national political officer for the TSSA trade union and served as the president of the Centre for Labour and Social Studies (CLASS).

In 2017, Tarry stood for selection to be the Labour parliamentary candidate for the Labour-held seat of Hull West and Hessle. He was the favourite to be selected, because of his relationship with Corbyn. The party instead selected Emma Hardy, a local teacher and trade union organiser.

In 2019, Tarry stood for selection to be the Labour parliamentary candidate for Ilford South, previously held by Mike Gapes who had left the Labour Party. His campaign was jointly run by GMB and Momentum. On 4 October 2019, the evening before members were due to vote, a rival candidate, Redbridge Council leader Jas Athwal, was suspended from the party over an allegation of sexual harassment. On 22 October 2019, after a postponement of the vote, and with Athwal ineligible due to his suspension, Tarry was selected. Athwal was subsequently cleared of any wrongdoing.

== Parliamentary career ==
At the 2019 general election, Tarry was elected to Parliament as MP for Ilford South with 65.6% of the vote and a majority of 24,101.

Tarry was appointed to the Transport Select Committee, on which he has been credited as being a "passionate advocate for public ownership". In this role, he called for introduction of a death in service payment scheme for London transport workers. He also joined the Socialist Campaign Group of left-wing Labour MPs.

Prior to his election in 2019 Tarry said "There are people associated with the Labour Party who have sought to exploit the issue [of antisemitism] just because they don't agree with Jeremy Corbyn over an issue of foreign policy". The Jewish Labour Movement criticised this remark as underplaying the issue of antisemitism in the Labour Party under Jeremy Corbyn. In response Tarry said that he was "clearly referring" to Mike Gapes who held the seat prior to him. He further stated, "As someone who has worked with many interfaith groups and organisations, including Searchlight and Hope not Hate, specifically to fight antisemitism and racism, this is something I care deeply about and would never seek to downplay".

During the 2020 Labour leadership election campaign, Tarry said that Keir Starmer would have to show how he would appeal to northern seats that had abandoned Labour, given that he was a "North London lawyer" and had opposed Brexit. Tarry subsequently supported Rebecca Long-Bailey in the leadership contest.

From April 2020 until January 2021, Tarry was a parliamentary private secretary to Ed Miliband in the Shadow Business, Energy and Industrial Strategy team, and as part of the parliamentary team of Angela Rayner, Deputy Leader of the Labour Party, when he was appointed to the role of Shadow Minister for Buses and Local Transport.

In summer 2022, Tarry was dismissed from his role as Shadow Minister for Buses and Local Transport for joining a rail strike picket line and advocating for inflation-matching pay rises. Labour stated he was sacked for unauthorised media appearances and "making up policy on the hoof".

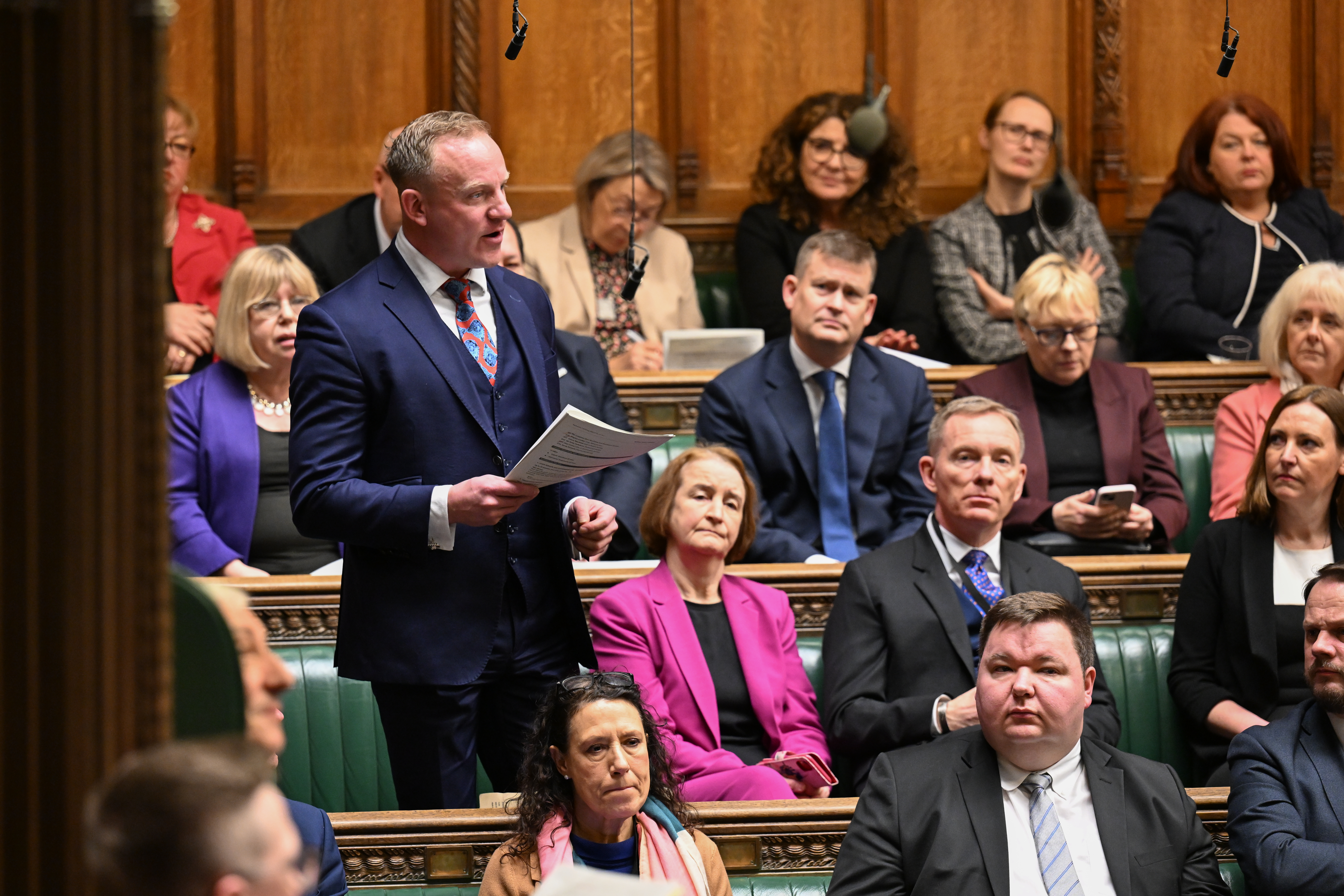
Tarry speaking during Prime Minister's Questions, 7 February 2024

Tarry said the murder of Zara Aleena in July 2022 in Ilford was "incredibly shocking" and called on the local community to "all [pull] together". Tarry said the case was a "shameful failure" of the probation service.

In July 2022, a trigger ballot was held in Ilford South to determine whether Tarry should face deselection; Tarry lost the vote 57.5% to 42.5%. On 10 October 2022, a reselection vote was held, which Tarry lost to local council leader Jas Athwal by 361 votes to 499. In April 2024, Tarry submitted a complaint about the vote saying discrepancies in the Labour membership list suggested tampering.

Tarry has been an advocate for drug checking at concerts and harm reduction measures in festival settings. In 2023, Tarry's letter on the subject to then-Home Secretary Suella Braverman was supported by Fatboy Slim, Billy Bragg and Olugbenga Adelekan as well as 31 MPs.

== Palestinian Rights Activism ==
Tarry has campaigned for Palestinian rights and has advocated for Palestinian statehood. He first visited the Palestinian territories in 1999 as a teenager, taking part in the Encounter Youth Exchange, an interfaith initiative involving Jewish, Christian and Muslim young people from Britain, Israel and Palestine. He subsequently returned to the region on numerous occasions, stating in a 2023 parliamentary debate that he had visited approximately six times. During his parliamentary career, he spoke in support of Palestinian rights and called for a ceasefire in Gaza.

On 26 October 2026, Tarry was among a 23-member international delegation, including British parliamentarians Clive Lewis, Lara Bird and Kate Nevens, detained and denied entry to the occupied West Bank by Israeli authorities at the Allenby/King Hussein Bridge crossing from Jordan. The delegation had intended to attend the Second Ramallah Congress, organised by Progressive International in partnership with Birzeit University, and meet Palestinian academics, civil society representatives and farmers. Tarry told The Guardian that the group had been detained for nine hours and criticised the Israeli authorities' decision to refuse entry.

== Personal life ==
Tarry married paediatrician Julia Fozard in 2016, and they have two sons. It was reported in July 2022 that the couple had separated. In the summer of 2022, journalists began reporting that Tarry was "in a relationship" with Angela Rayner, then Deputy Leader of the Labour Party; the relationship ended in 2023, and then resumed.

Parliament of the United Kingdom
Preceded by Mike Gapes	Member of Parliament for Ilford South; 2019–2024	Succeeded by Jas Athwal
