= Ilford Town =

Electoral ward in the London Borough of Redbridge

- Electoral ward for the Redbridge London Borough Council
- Ilford Town ward boundaries since 2018
- Borough: Redbridge
- County: Greater London
- Population: 12,327 (2021)
- Electorate: 7,136 (2022)
- Major settlements: Ilford
- Area: 1.047 square kilometres (0.404 sq mi)

Current electoral ward
- Created: 2018
- Number of members: 2
- Councillors: Syeda Ahmed; Shoaib Patel
- Created from: Clementswood, Loxford, Newbury, Valentines
- GSS code: E05011246

Ilford Town is an electoral ward in the London Borough of Redbridge. The ward was first used in the 2018 elections. It returns two councillors to Redbridge London Borough Council.

== List of councillors ==
Term	Councillor	Party
2018–present	Syeda Ahmed	Labour
2018–present	Shoaib Patel	Labour

== Redbridge council elections ==
=== 2022 election ===
The election took place on 5 May 2022.

2022 Redbridge London Borough Council election: Ilford Town (2)
Party	Candidate	Votes	%	±%
Labour	Syeda Ahmed	1,393	73.2	▼0.1
Labour	Shoaib Patel	1,329	69.9	▼2.0
Conservative	Karen Packer	436	22.9	▲12.3
Conservative	Dee Datta	398	20.9	▲13.2
Turnout		1,902	26.7	▼9.1
Labour hold				
Labour hold				

=== 2018 election ===
The election took place on 3 May 2018.

2018 Redbridge London Borough Council election: Ilford Town (2)
Party	Candidate	Votes	%	±%
Labour	Syeda Ahmed	1,546	73.27	N/A
Labour	Shoaib Patel	1,518	71.94	N/A
Independent	Meenakshi Sharma	429	20.33	N/A
Conservative	Mona Ahsan	224	10.62	N/A
Conservative	Olakunle Olaifa	162	7.68	N/A
Turnout		2,110	35.77	
Labour win (new seat)				
Labour win (new seat)				
