= Wanstead Village =

Electoral ward in the London Borough of Redbridge

- Electoral ward for the Redbridge London Borough Council
- Wanstead Village ward boundaries since 2018
- Borough: Redbridge
- County: Greater London
- Population: 12,764 (2021)
- Electorate: 9,570 (2022)
- Area: 2.321 square kilometres (0.896 sq mi)

Current electoral ward
- Created: 2018
- Number of members: 3
- Councillors: Jo Blackman; Paul Donovan; Daniel Morgan-Thomas
- GSS code: E05011255

Wanstead Village is an electoral ward in the London Borough of Redbridge. The ward was first used in the 2018 elections. It returns three councillors to Redbridge London Borough Council.

== List of councillors ==
| Term | Councillor | Party |
|---|---|---|
| 2018–present | Jo Blackman | Labour |
| 2018–present | Paul Donovan | Labour |
| 2018–present | Daniel Morgan-Thomas | Labour |

== Redbridge council elections ==
=== 2022 election ===
The election took place on 5 May 2022.

2022 Redbridge London Borough Council election: Wanstead Village (3)
| Party | Candidate | Votes | % | ±% |
|---|---|---|---|---|
| Labour | Jo Blackman | 2,058 | 50.4 | ▲4.1 |
| Labour | Paul Donovan | 1,817 | 44.5 | ▼0.1 |
| Labour | Daniel Morgan-Thomas | 1,713 | 42.0 | ▲1.3 |
| Conservative | Gavin Chambers | 958 | 23.5 | ▼17.0 |
| Conservative | Fatema Hussain | 863 | 21.1 | ▼18.3 |
| Liberal Democrats | Crispin Acton | 841 | 20.6 | ▲11.5 |
| Conservative | Sharn Kalsi | 822 | 20.1 | ▼18.7 |
| Liberal Democrats | Neil Hepworth | 804 | 19.7 | ▲11.6 |
| Liberal Democrats | Scott Wilding | 694 | 17.0 | New |
| Green | Susanne Marshall | 504 | 12.3 | ▲1.3 |
| Green | Richard Lafferty | 394 | 9.7 | ▲2.8 |
| Green | John Rowlands | 293 | 7.2 | ▲0.4 |
| Turnout | | 4,082 | 42.7 | ▼1.8 |
| Labour hold | | | | |
| Labour hold | | | | |
| Labour hold | | | | |

=== 2018 election ===
The election took place on 3 May 2018.

2018 Redbridge London Borough Council election: Wanstead Village (3)
| Party | Candidate | Votes | % | ±% |
|---|---|---|---|---|
| Labour | Jo Blackman | 2,009 | 46.33 | N/A |
| Labour | Paul Donovan | 1,935 | 44.63 | N/A |
| Labour | Daniel Morgan-Thomas | 1,764 | 40.68 | N/A |
| Conservative | Scott Wilding | 1,754 | 40.45 | N/A |
| Conservative | Michelle Dunn | 1,707 | 39.37 | N/A |
| Conservative | Steve Wilks | 1,683 | 38.81 | N/A |
| Green | Elisabeth Williams | 477 | 11.00 | N/A |
| Liberal Democrats | Crispin Acton | 393 | 9.06 | N/A |
| Liberal Democrats | David Bruck | 349 | 8.05 | N/A |
| Green | Tony Csoka | 301 | 6.94 | N/A |
| Green | Cedric Knight | 293 | 6.76 | N/A |
| Turnout | | 4,336 | 44.50 | |
| Labour win (new seat) | | | | |
| Labour win (new seat) | | | | |
| Labour win (new seat) | | | | |
