= 2018 Redbridge London Borough Council election =

2018 local election in England

← 2014	3 May 2018	2022 →

All 63 seats to Redbridge Council 32 seats needed for a majority
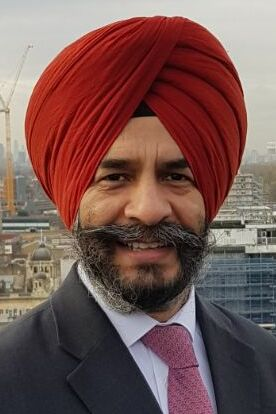

	First party	Second party
Leader	Jas Athwal	Paul Canal
Party	Labour	Conservative
Last election	35 seats, 46.9%	25 seats, 34.2%
Seats before	38^{†}	25^{†}
Seats won	51	12
Seat change	▲13*	▼13*
Popular vote	127,484	77,055
Percentage	58.4%	35.3%
Swing	▲11.5%	▲1.1%
- Map of the results of the 2018 Redbridge council election. Conservatives in blue, and Labour in red.
Council control before election
Labour
Council control after election
Labour

The 2018 election for Redbridge London Borough Council took place on 3 May 2018, the same day as for other London Boroughs. All 63 seats were up for election, with new ward boundaries in place. The Labour Party retained control of the council with an increased majority, taking 81% of the seats.

== Electoral arrangements ==
New ward boundaries were used for the first time. Prior to the 2018 election the council had 63 councillors elected from 32 wards (all wards elected three members). From the 2018 election, 63 councillors were elected from 22 wards (19 three-member wards and 3 two-member wards).

Polling took place on 3 May 2018.

== Results ==
The Labour Party won 51 seats (up 16 from 2014), the Conservatives won 12 (down 13 from 2014). Three Lib Dem councillors were elected in 2014, but none in 2018. Due to the boundary changes, the BBC calculated 'notional' seat changes of +13 for Labour and -13 for the Conservatives.

Redbridge Council election result 2018
Party	Seats	Gains	Losses	Net gain/loss	Seats %	Votes %	Votes	+/−
Labour	51			▲16	81.0	58.4	127,484	▲11.5
Conservative	12			▼13	19.0	35.3	77,055	▲1.1
Liberal Democrats	0			▼3	0.0	3.7	8,110	▼5.6
Green	0			0	0.0	1.6	3,455	▼0.4
Independent	0			0	0.0	0.7	1,636	▼1.6
Redbridge Trade Union Party	0			0	0.0	0.3	623	New

== Ward results ==
=== Aldborough ===
Aldborough (3)
Party	Candidate	Votes	%	±%
Labour	John Howard*	2,505	63.08	N/A
Labour	Debbie Kaur-Thiara*	2,408	60.64	N/A
Labour	Jyotsna Islam	2,146	54.04	N/A
Conservative	Alicja Borkowska	1,145	28.83	N/A
Conservative	Kash Akram	1,130	28.46	N/A
Conservative	Gary Sukhija	990	24.93	N/A
Redbridge Trade Union Party	Andy Walker	623	15.69	N/A
Turnout		3,971	39.29	
Labour win (new seat)				
Labour win (new seat)				
Labour win (new seat)				

=== Barkingside ===
Barkingside (3)
Party	Candidate	Votes	%	±%
Labour	Judith Garfield	2,457	52.75	N/A
Labour	Martin Sachs	2,365	50.77	N/A
Labour	Mohammed Noor	2,255	48.41	N/A
Conservative	Ashley Kissin*	1,984	42.59	N/A
Conservative	Melvyn Marks	1,879	40.34	N/A
Conservative	Karen Packer*	1,876	40.27	N/A
Green	Deborah Fink	385	8.27	N/A
Turnout		4,658	44.32	
Labour win (new seat)				
Labour win (new seat)				
Labour win (new seat)				

=== Bridge ===
Bridge (3)
Party	Candidate	Votes	%	±%
Conservative	Paul Canal*	1,735	49.30	N/A
Conservative	Anita Boateng	1,714	48.71	N/A
Conservative	Robin Turbefield*	1,605	45.61	N/A
Labour	Lloyd Duddridge*	1,593	45.27	N/A
Labour	Guy Williams	1,552	44.10	N/A
Labour	Ellie Taylor	1,470	41.77	N/A
Green	David Reynolds	456	12.96	N/A
Turnout		3,519	36.19	
Conservative win (new seat)				
Conservative win (new seat)				
Conservative win (new seat)				

Note: Turbefield subsequently defected to Reform UK.

=== Chadwell ===
Chadwell (3)
Party	Candidate	Votes	%	±%
Labour	Bert Jones*	2,279	61.81	N/A
Labour	Hannah Chaudhry	2,183	59.21	N/A
Labour	Anne Sachs*	2,057	55.79	N/A
Conservative	Simon Hearn	997	27.04	N/A
Conservative	Mohammed Uddin	887	24.06	N/A
Conservative	Diana Danescu	874	23.70	N/A
Liberal Democrats	Gary Staight	350	9.49	N/A
Green	John Tyne	350	9.49	N/A
Turnout		3,687	34.04	
Labour win (new seat)				
Labour win (new seat)				
Labour win (new seat)				

=== Churchfields ===
Churchfields (3)
Party	Candidate	Votes	%	±%
Conservative	Stephen Adams	1,832	39.02	N/A
Conservative	Clark Vasey	1,817	38.70	N/A
Labour	Rosa Gomez	1,766	37.61	N/A
Conservative	Alex Wilson	1,756	37.40	N/A
Labour	Wendy Taylor	1,552	33.06	N/A
Labour	Chowdhury Rahman	1,470	31.31	N/A
Liberal Democrats	Gwyneth Deakins*	1,163	24.77	N/A
Liberal Democrats	Geoffrey Seeff	1,102	23.47	N/A
Liberal Democrats	Mike Daykin	960	20.45	N/A
Turnout		4,695	43.22	
Conservative win (new seat)				
Conservative win (new seat)				
Labour win (new seat)				

=== Clayhall ===
Clayhall (3)
Party	Candidate	Votes	%	±%
Labour	Gurdial Bhamra*	2,700	55.95	N/A
Labour	Sunita Bhamra	2,588	53.63	N/A
Labour	Mohammed Uddin	2,485	51.49	N/A
Conservative	Pranav Bhanot	2,020	41.86	N/A
Conservative	Robert Cole*	1,782	36.92	N/A
Conservative	Alan Weinberg*	1,704	35.31	N/A
Liberal Democrats	Ash Holder	204	4.23	N/A
Turnout		4,826	48.63	
Labour win (new seat)				
Labour win (new seat)				
Labour win (new seat)				

=== Clementswood ===
Clementswood (3)
Party	Candidate	Votes	%	±%
Labour	Helen Coomb	2,378*	79.59	N/A
Labour	Muhammed Javed	2,278*	76.24	N/A
Labour	Zulfiqar Hussain	2,245*	75.13	N/A
Conservative	Matthew Cole	471	15.76	N/A
Conservative	Christopher Cummins*	443	14.83	N/A
Conservative	Christopher Holmes	427	14.29	N/A
Turnout		2,988	33.28	
Labour win (new seat)				
Labour win (new seat)				
Labour win (new seat)				

=== Cranbrook ===
Cranbrook (3)
Party	Candidate	Votes	%	±%
Labour	Chaudhary Ahmed*	2,350	60.26	N/A
Labour	Syeda Ali	2,218	56.87	N/A
Labour	Varinder Singh Bola*	2,089	53.56	N/A
Conservative	Matthew Chaudhary*	1,711	43.87	N/A
Conservative	David Rome	1,298	33.28	N/A
Conservative	Richard Firmstone	1,297	33.26	N/A
Turnout		3,900	41.77	
Labour win (new seat)				
Labour win (new seat)				
Labour win (new seat)				

=== Fairlop ===
Fairlop (3)
Party	Candidate	Votes	%	±%
Conservative	Howard Berlin	2,044	55.51	N/A
Conservative	Joyce Ryan*	2,011	54.62	N/A
Conservative	Ruth Clark	1,948	52.91	N/A
Labour	Bob Chattaway	1,462	39.71	N/A
Labour	Nirojan Raveendralingam	1,303	35.39	N/A
Labour	Kris Sangani	1,232	33.46	N/A
Liberal Democrats	Joel Winston	256	6.95	N/A
Turnout		3,682	37.22	
Conservative win (new seat)				
Conservative win (new seat)				
Conservative win (new seat)				

=== Fulwell ===
Fullwell (3)
Party	Candidate	Votes	%	±%
Labour	Vanisha Solanki	2,432	54.76	N/A
Labour	Sham Islam	2,212	49.81	N/A
Labour	Sadiq Kothia	2,129	47.94	N/A
Conservative	Sanjib Bhattacharjee	1,682	37.87	N/A
Conservative	Jeevah Haran*	1,673	37.67	N/A
Conservative	Wesley Manta	1,499	33.75	N/A
Liberal Democrats	Dominic Black	443	9.98	N/A
Turnout		4,441	40.55	
Labour win (new seat)				
Labour win (new seat)				
Labour win (new seat)				

=== Goodmayes ===
Goodmayes (3)
Party	Candidate	Votes	%	±%
Labour	Namreen Chaudhry	2,422	74.09	N/A
Labour	Kam Rai*	2,329	71.25	N/A
Labour	Neil Zammett*	2,260	69.13	N/A
Conservative	Maureen Patricia	696	21.29	N/A
Conservative	Alice Pastides	658	20.13	N/A
Conservative	Rash Mahal	650	19.88	N/A
Turnout		3,269	32.90	
Labour win (new seat)				
Labour win (new seat)				
Labour win (new seat)				

=== Hainault ===
Hainault (3)
Party	Candidate	Votes	%	±%
Labour	Roy Emmett*	1,905	54.76	N/A
Labour	Mark Santos*	1,815	52.17	N/A
Labour	Joe Hehir*	1,744	50.13	N/A
Conservative	Sam Chapman	1,593	45.79	N/A
Conservative	John Kissane	1,412	40.59	N/A
Conservative	James Pepe	1,394	40.07	N/A
Turnout		3,479	35.38	
Labour win (new seat)				
Labour win (new seat)				
Labour win (new seat)				

=== Ilford Town ===
Ilford Town (2)
Party	Candidate	Votes	%	±%
Labour	Syeda Ahmed	1,546	73.27	N/A
Labour	Shoaib Patel	1,518	71.94	N/A
Independent	Meenakshi Sharma	429	20.33	N/A
Conservative	Mona Ahsan	224	10.62	N/A
Conservative	Olakunle Olaifa	162	7.68	N/A
Turnout		2,110	35.77	
Labour win (new seat)				
Labour win (new seat)				

=== Loxford ===
Loxford (3)
Party	Candidate	Votes	%	±%
Labour	Chaudhary Iqbal	2,128	75.92	N/A
Labour	Saira Jamil	2,101	74.96	N/A
Labour	Taifur Rashid*	1,993	71.10	N/A
Conservative	Lucy Bostick	434	15.48	N/A
Conservative	Hasnain Ahmed	431	15.38	N/A
Conservative	Michael Speakman	425	15.16	N/A
Green	Syed Ali	244	8.70	N/A
Turnout		2,803	31.74	
Labour win (new seat)				
Labour win (new seat)				
Labour win (new seat)				

=== Mayfield ===
Mayfield (3)
Party	Candidate	Votes	%	±%
Labour	Jas Athwal*	2,717	76.11	N/A
Labour	Kay Flint*	2,602	72.89	N/A
Labour	Ayodhiya Parkash*	2,523	70.67	N/A
Conservative	Wilson Chowdhry	774	21.68	N/A
Conservative	Stuart Halstead	761	21.32	N/A
Conservative	Zeb Quddos	619	17.34	N/A
Turnout		3,570	35.13	
Labour win (new seat)				
Labour win (new seat)				
Labour win (new seat)				

=== Monkhams ===
Monkhams (2)
Party	Candidate	Votes	%	±%
Conservative	Linda Huggett*	2,140	69.37	N/A
Conservative	Michael Stark*	2,050	66.45	N/A
Labour	Catherine Rowan	579	18.77	N/A
Labour	Tareq Chowdhury	561	18.18	N/A
Liberal Democrats	Claire Hunt	361	11.70	N/A
Liberal Democrats	Mike Teahan	306	9.92	N/A
Turnout		3,085	42.14	
Conservative win (new seat)				
Conservative win (new seat)				

=== Newbury ===
Newbury (3)
Party	Candidate	Votes	%	±%
Labour	Thavathuray Jeyaranjan*	2,280	57.90	N/A
Labour	Dev Sharma*	2,246	57.03	N/A
Labour	Elaine Norman*	2,230	56.63	N/A
Conservative	Afsor Hussain	1,235	31.36	N/A
Conservative	Greta Rene	973	24.71	N/A
Conservative	Baldev Bains	887	22.52	N/A
Independent	David Stephens	484	12.29	N/A
Independent	Amritpal Gill	254	6.45	N/A
Turnout		3,938	41.03	
Labour win (new seat)				
Labour win (new seat)				
Labour win (new seat)				

=== Seven Kings ===
Seven Kings (3)
Party	Candidate	Votes	%	±%
Labour	Harold Bellwood*	2,630	77.58	N/A
Labour	Bob Littlewood*	2,508	73.98	N/A
Labour	Sareena Sanger	2,441	72.01	N/A
Conservative	Mosheraf Ashraf	706	20.83	N/A
Conservative	Thor Halland	586	17.29	N/A
Conservative	Shirley Mensah	575	16.96	N/A
Turnout		3,390	35.00	
Labour win (new seat)				
Labour win (new seat)				
Labour win (new seat)				

=== South Woodford ===
South Woodford (3)
Party	Candidate	Votes	%	±%
Conservative	Suzanne Nolan*	1,554	38.74	N/A
Conservative	Michael Duffell	1,533	38.22	N/A
Labour	Beverley Brewer	1,532	38.19	N/A
Conservative	Joel Herga	1,508	37.60	N/A
Labour	Greg Eglin	1,439	35.88	N/A
Labour	Mark Walker	1,382	34.46	N/A
Liberal Democrats	Natalie Darby	709	17.68	N/A
Liberal Democrats	Paul Emsley	613	15.28	N/A
Liberal Democrats	Nat Pabla	579	14.44	N/A
Green	Lee Burkwood	355	8.85	N/A
Green	Ashley Gunstock	339	8.45	N/A
Green	Barry Cooper	255	6.36	N/A
Turnout		4,011	43.55	
Conservative win (new seat)				
Conservative win (new seat)				
Labour win (new seat)				

=== Valentines ===
Valentines (3)
Party	Candidate	Votes	%	±%
Labour	Ross Hatfull*	2,317	72.18	N/A
Labour	Khayer Chowdhury*	2,267	70.62	N/A
Labour	Farah Hussain*	2,105	65.58	N/A
Conservative	Andrew Francis	739	23.02	N/A
Conservative	George Dunkley	645	20.09	N/A
Conservative	Unditi Shubhaker	421	13.12	N/A
Independent	Barrymore Scotland	258	8.04	N/A
Independent	Max Reid	211	6.57	N/A
Turnout		3,210	31.60	
Labour win (new seat)				
Labour win (new seat)				
Labour win (new seat)				

=== Wanstead Park ===
Wanstead Park (2)
Party	Candidate	Votes	%	±%
Labour	Sheila Bain*	1,766	60.07	N/A
Labour	Paul Merry*	1,641	55.82	N/A
Conservative	Pat Bennett	976	33.20	N/A
Conservative	Richard Kays	919	31.26	N/A
Liberal Democrats	Christopher Pallet	322	10.95	N/A
Turnout		2,940	48.27	
Labour win (new seat)				
Labour win (new seat)				

=== Wanstead Village ===
Wanstead Village (3)
Party	Candidate	Votes	%	±%
Labour	Jo Blackman	2,009	46.33	N/A
Labour	Paul Donovan	1,935	44.63	N/A
Labour	Daniel Morgan-Thomas	1,764	40.68	N/A
Conservative	Scott Wilding	1,754	40.45	N/A
Conservative	Michelle Dunn*	1,707	39.37	N/A
Conservative	Steve Wilks	1,683	38.81	N/A
Green	Elisabeth Williams	477	11.00	N/A
Liberal Democrats	Crispin Acton	393	9.06	N/A
Liberal Democrats	David Bruck	349	8.05	N/A
Green	Tony Csoka	301	6.94	N/A
Green	Cedric Knight	293	6.76	N/A
Turnout		4,336	44.50	
Labour win (new seat)				
Labour win (new seat)				
Labour win (new seat)				
