= 2014 Redbridge London Borough Council election =

2014 local election in England

- 22 May 2014

All 63 seats to Redbridge Council 32 seats needed for a majority
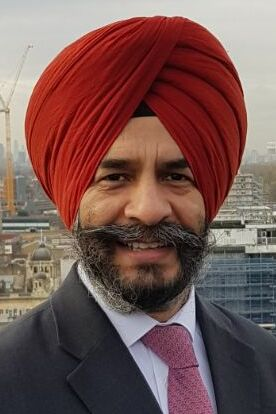

	First party	Second party	Third party
Leader	Jas Athwal	Paul Canal	Ian Bond
Party	Labour	Conservative	Liberal Democrats
Last election	35 seats, 37.2%	30 seats, 36.7%	7 seats, 22.6%
Seats before	26^{†}	30^{†}	7^{†}
Seats won	35	25	3
Seat change	▲9	▼5	▼4
Council control before election
No Overall Control
Council control after election
Labour

Map of the results of the 2014 Redbridge council election. Conservatives in blue, Labour in red and Liberal Democrats in yellow.

The 2014 Redbridge Council election took place on 22 May 2014 to elect members of Redbridge London Borough Council in England. This was on the same day as other local elections.

== Result ==
Labour won control from "No Overall Control". Labour won 35 seats (+9), The Conservatives won 25 seats (-5) and the Liberal Democrats won 3 seats (-4).

It was the first time in the borough's history that Labour had won a majority of seats on the council.

== Ward results ==
=== Aldborough ===
Aldborough
Party	Candidate	Votes	%	±%
Labour	Debbie Kaur-Thiara	2,434	50.0	+12.8
Labour	John Howard	2,364	48.6	+7.9
Labour	Wes Streeting	2,100	43.1	+3.3
Conservative	Vanessa Cole	1,919	39.4	−3.5
Conservative	Ruth Clark	1,903	39.1	−2.3
Conservative	Thane Thaneswaran	1,526	31.4	−6.8
Save King George Hospital Party	Andy Walker	1,092	22.4	N/A
Liberal Democrats	Richard Mathias	211	4.3	−10.7
Turnout		4,867	44.9	
Labour hold		Swing		
Labour gain from Conservative		Swing		
Labour gain from Conservative		Swing		

=== Barkingside ===
Barkingside
Party	Candidate	Votes	%	±%
Conservative	Ashley Kissin	2,007	48.2	+2.1
Conservative	Karen Packer	1,995	47.9	+3.8
Conservative	Keith Prince	1,992	47.8	+2.5
Labour	Martin Sachs	1,795	43.1	+7.0
Labour	Vinaya Sharma	1,741	41.8	+7.5
Labour	Ayub Khan	1,719	41.3	+7.3
UKIP	Robert Whitehall	366	8.8	N/A
Turnout		4,167	41.9	
Conservative hold		Swing		
Conservative hold		Swing		
Conservative hold		Swing		

=== Bridge ===
Bridge
Party	Candidate	Votes	%	±%
Conservative	Paul Canal	1,233	39.1	−6.0
Conservative	John Fairley-Churchill	1,119	35.5	−8.7
Conservative	Robin Turbefield	1,069	33.9	−4.5
Labour	Jay Asher	978	31.0	+2.9
Labour	Baris Yerli	770	24.4	+1.3
UKIP	Issy Gould	749	23.7	N/A
Labour	Shushila Patel	701	22.2	+0.1
UKIP	Simon Hearn	697	22.1	N/A
UKIP	Ruth Schechtman	648	20.5	N/A
Green	David Reynolds	368	11.7	N/A
Liberal Democrats	Helen Duffett	313	9.9	−8.5
Liberal Democrats	Angela Yeoman	241	7.6	−10.4
Turnout		3,154	34.8	
Conservative hold		Swing		
Conservative hold		Swing		
Conservative hold		Swing		

=== Chadwell ===
Chadwell
Party	Candidate	Votes	%	±%
Labour	Aziz Choudhury	2,352	57.5	+24.7
Labour	Anne Sachs	1,975	48.3	+18.0
Labour	Neil Zammett	1,707	41.7	+12.7
Conservative	Mohammed Uddin	1,106	27.0	+2.2
Conservative	Bharat Parmar	917	22.4	+0.1
Conservative	Kunle Olaifa	878	21.5	−0.7
Green	John Tyne	605	14.8	−0.3
An Independence from Europe	Paul Wiffen	474	11.6	+3.5
Liberal Democrats	Naren Dattani	237	5.8	−21.7
Liberal Democrats	Kathleen Teahan	213	5.2	−22.3
Turnout		4,092	38.7	
Labour hold		Swing		
Labour hold		Swing		
Labour hold		Swing		

=== Church End ===
Church End
Party	Candidate	Votes	%	±%
Liberal Democrats	Hugh Cleaver	1,361	37.1	−14.6
Conservative	Emma Best	1,223	33.3	+3.7
Conservative	Tom McLaren	1,168	31.8	+3.9
Conservative	Joel Herga	1,144	31.1	+4.6
Liberal Democrats	Deborah Prince	1,134	30.9	−19.3
Liberal Democrats	Geoffrey Seeff	1,053	28.7	−19.5
Labour	Beverley Brewer	825	22.5	+5.5
Labour	Paul Daintry	746	20.3	+5.1
Labour	Kenneth Turner	631	17.2	+2.4
UKIP	David Fahn	481	13.1	N/A
Green	Sara Kassam	391	10.6	+2.7
Independent	Nicola Sinclair	140	3.8	−44.4
Turnout		3,673	40.4	
Liberal Democrats hold		Swing		
Conservative gain from Liberal Democrats		Swing		
Conservative gain from Liberal Democrats		Swing		

=== Clayhall ===
Clayhall
Party	Candidate	Votes	%	±%
Conservative	Robert Cole	2,227	47.3	+6.3
Conservative	Alan Weinberg	2,138	45.4	+4.5
Labour	Gurdial Bhamra	2,110	44.8	+3.3
Conservative	Nathan Pathmanathan	2,038	43.3	+4.0
Labour	Sanjib Bhattacharjee	1,926	40.9	+1.7
Labour	Shamshia Ali	1,870	39.7	+2.1
Liberal Democrats	Harjinder Singh	372	7.9	−6.8
UKIP	Donna Nada	286	6.1	N/A
Liberal Democrats	Ashburn Holder	239	5.1	−9.0
Turnout		4,706	44.9	
Conservative hold		Swing		
Conservative hold		Swing		
Labour hold		Swing		

=== Clementswood ===
Clementswood
Party	Candidate	Votes	%	±%
Labour	Helen Coomb	2,340	63.1	+16.0
Labour	Zulfiqar Hussain	2,233	60.2	+14.1
Labour	Muhammad Javed	2,232	60.2	+12.8
Liberal Democrats	Zahid Butt	738	19.9	−11.6
Liberal Democrats	Sanjeev Patel	712	19.2	−8.2
Liberal Democrats	Ajaz Akram	541	14.6	−12.3
Conservative	Jahangir Ahmed	438	11.8	−12.7
Green	Wilson Chowdhury	409	11.0	N/A
Conservative	Habib Rehman	362	9.8	−8.7
Conservative	Javed Sheikh	360	9.7	−6.7
Turnout		3,707	35.1	
Labour hold		Swing		
Labour hold		Swing		
Labour hold		Swing		

=== Cranbrook ===
Cranbrook
Party	Candidate	Votes	%	±%
Labour	Mushtaq Ahmed	2,018	51.1	+11.3
Conservative	Mahboob Chaudhary	1,827	46.2	+4.9
Labour	Varinder Bola	1,812	45.9	+11.0
Labour	Laura Wilkes	1,668	42.2	+8.4
Conservative	Ashok Kumar	1,602	40.5	+2.7
Conservative	Richard Firmstone	1,319	33.4	−0.5
UKIP	Alan Hughes	276	7.0	N/A
Liberal Democrats	Susan Hamlyn	244	6.2	−11.9
Turnout		3,952	40.2	
Labour hold		Swing		
Conservative hold		Swing		
Labour gain from Conservative		Swing		

=== Fairlop ===
Fairlop
Party	Candidate	Votes	%	±%
Conservative	Brian Lambert	1,613	43.8	−6.5
Conservative	Joyce Ryan	1,547	42.0	−5.9
Conservative	Tom Sharpe	1,312	35.6	−8.6
Labour	Muhammad Raza	1,128	30.6	+1.5
Labour	Davinder Nijjar	1,127	30.6	+1.7
Labour	Ali Younis	1,044	28.3	+4.3
UKIP	Gary Day-Smith	811	22.0	N/A
UKIP	Jonathan Seymour	780	21.2	N/A
UKIP	James Pepe	721	19.6	N/A
Liberal Democrats	Claire Hunt	233	6.3	−7.6
Turnout		3,684	37.3	
Conservative hold		Swing		
Conservative hold		Swing		
Conservative hold		Swing		

=== Fullwell ===
Fullwell
Party	Candidate	Votes	%	±%
Conservative	David Bromiley	1,593	41.8	−8.8
Conservative	Nick Hayes	1,409	37.0	−9.5
Conservative	Jeevah Haran	1,389	36.4	−11.9
Labour	Chris Stone	1,303	34.2	+4.6
Labour	Baljit Panesar	1,265	33.2	+4.7
Labour	Tal Ofer	1,263	33.1	+7.3
UKIP	Jim Kellman	742	19.5	+12.4
Independent	Harold Moth	658	17.3	−31.0
Liberal Democrats	Dominic Black	329	8.6	−7.9
Turnout		3,812	38.5	
Conservative hold		Swing		
Conservative hold		Swing		
Conservative hold		Swing		

=== Goodmayes ===
Goodmayes
Party	Candidate	Votes	%	±%
Labour	Bert Jones	2,347	61.1	+14.5
Labour	Kam Rai	2,272	59.2	+13.6
Labour	Barbara White	2,201	57.3	+14.8
Conservative	Mohammed Asif	1,145	29.8	+5.2
Conservative	Pradip Solanki	855	22.3	−2.3
Conservative	Arvind Bhadresa	798	20.8	−0.7
Liberal Democrats	Tariq Bin Aziz	553	14.4	−13.2
Green	Kevin Page	368	9.6	N/A
Turnout		3,841	38.9	
Labour hold		Swing		
Labour hold		Swing		
Labour hold		Swing		

=== Hainault ===
Hainault
Party	Candidate	Votes	%	±%
Labour	Roy Emmett	1,227	37.1	+5.2
Labour	Mark Santos	1,143	34.5	+5.5
Labour	Joe Hehir	1,035	31.3	+4.0
Conservative	David Poole	984	29.7	−3.3
UKIP	Ted Griffin	900	27.2	−7.5
Conservative	Melvyn Marks	895	27.0	−10.9
UKIP	Mark Aaron	894	27.0	+20.6
Conservative	Melinda Ponsonby	873	26.4	−8.3
UKIP	Kenny Thomas	818	24.7	+19.6
British Democratic	Julian Leppert	284	8.6	−8.3
Liberal Democrats	Ali Hifzur	156	4.7	−5.7
Turnout		3,310	34.3	
Labour gain from Conservative		Swing		
Labour gain from Conservative		Swing		
Labour gain from Conservative		Swing		

=== Loxford ===
Loxford
Party	Candidate	Votes	%	±%
Labour	Mohammad Ahmed	2,472	56.5	−6.2
Labour	Shakil Ahmad	2,453	56.0	+3.9
Labour	Taifur Rashid	2,278	52.0	−4.3
Independent	Filly Maravala	1,670	38.2	−24.5
Independent	Saima Butt	1,382	31.6	N/A
Independent	Virendra Tewari	1,318	30.1	−22.0
Conservative	Adnan Chaudhary	328	7.5	−9.2
Conservative	Mark Balcomb	327	7.5	−9.0
Conservative	Michael Speakman	319	7.3	−6.9
Turnout		4,377	38.8	
Labour hold		Swing		
Labour hold		Swing		
Labour hold		Swing		

=== Mayfield ===
Mayfield
Party	Candidate	Votes	%	±%
Labour	Jas Athwal	2,731	67.2	+17.0
Labour	Kay Flint	2,620	64.5	+18.3
Labour	Ayodhiya Parkash	2,597	63.9	+17.6
Conservative	Kaiser Chaudhary	1,034	25.4	−3.3
Conservative	Pauline Fynn	928	22.8	−5.3
Conservative	Nisha Patel	904	22.2	−3.0
Liberal Democrats	Pamela Winborne	260	6.4	−8.2
Turnout		4,064	39.5	
Labour hold		Swing		
Labour hold		Swing		
Labour hold		Swing		

=== Monkhams ===
Monkhams
Party	Candidate	Votes	%	±%
Conservative	Linda Huggett	2,188	64.1	+12.3
Conservative	Jim O'Shea	2,011	58.9	+9.2
Conservative	Michael Stark	2,003	58.6	+8.3
Liberal Democrats	Anne Crook	692	20.3	−11.7
Labour	Elizabeth Pearce	513	15.0	+0.9
Liberal Democrats	David Cracknell	509	14.9	−14.0
Labour	David Pearce	481	14.1	+2.9
Liberal Democrats	Steven Warwick	471	13.8	−12.9
Labour	Francis White	439	12.9	+3.9
Green	Theresa Reynolds	372	10.9	N/A
Turnout		3,416	40.1	
Conservative hold		Swing		
Conservative hold		Swing		
Conservative hold		Swing		

=== Newbury ===
Newbury
Party	Candidate	Votes	%	±%
Labour	Thavathuray Jeyaranjan	2,821	58.3	+11.2
Labour	Dev Sharma	2,766	57.2	+10.7
Labour	Elaine Norman	2,616	54.1	+7.8
Conservative	Afsor Hussain	1,673	34.6	+2.6
Conservative	Vijay Thurairajah	1,393	28.8	−1.6
Conservative	Zeb Quddos	1,186	24.5	−3.9
Liberal Democrats	Susan Mann	434	9.0	−7.1
Turnout		4,838	39.1	
Labour hold		Swing		
Labour hold		Swing		
Labour hold		Swing		

=== Roding ===
Roding
Party	Candidate	Votes	%	±%
Liberal Democrats	Ian Bond*	1,181	32.5	−5.2
Liberal Democrats	Gwyneth Deakins*	1,162	32.0	−4.2
Conservative	Sarah Blaber	1,053	29.0	−4.1
Liberal Democrats	Michael Teahan	980	27.0	−13.4
Conservative	Ben Caine	980	27.0	−5.4
Labour	Joe Barnard	977	26.9	+4.8
Labour	Mohammed Noor	810	22.3	+1.8
Conservative	Prerna Sian	809	22.2	−8.4
Labour	Rahman Sidique	786	21.6	+1.8
UKIP	Chris Thurston	602	16.6	N/A
Green	Susanne Marshall	359	9.9	N/A
Turnout		3,636	40.6	
Liberal Democrats hold		Swing		
Liberal Democrats hold		Swing		
Conservative gain from Liberal Democrats		Swing		

=== Seven Kings ===
Seven Kings
Party	Candidate	Votes	%	±%
Labour	Stuart Bellwood	2,678	62.0	+10.1
Labour	Bob Littlewood	2,564	58.4	+8.9
Labour	Baldesh Nijjar	2,480	56.5	+7.6
Conservative	Mosheraf Ashraf	1,191	27.1	+0.8
Conservative	Ali Hai	912	20.8	−5.3
Liberal Democrats	Sadiq Kothia	897	20.4	+1.6
Conservative	Aceil Haddad	746	17.0	−7.2
Liberal Democrats	Gary Staight	524	11.9	−3.2
Turnout		4,393	39.9	
Labour hold		Swing		
Labour hold		Swing		
Labour hold		Swing		

=== Snaresbrook ===
Snaresbrook
Party	Candidate	Votes	%	±%
Conservative	Suzanne Nolan	1,724	45.6	+2.8
Conservative	Colin Cronin	1,686	44.6	+3.7
Conservative	Chris Cummins	1,643	43.5	+0.9
Labour	Sophia Eglin	1,497	39.6	+8.7
Labour	Gregor Eglin	1,468	38.8	+7.5
Labour	Imraan Hokam-Dahd	1,161	30.7	+0.7
Green	Deborah Fink	590	15.6	+6.0
Liberal Democrats	Malcolm Swallow	284	7.5	−10.4
Liberal Democrats	David Bruck	280	7.4	−11.6
Liberal Democrats	Levent Chetinkaya	209	5.5	−11.0
Turnout		3,781	40.2	
Conservative hold		Swing		
Conservative hold		Swing		
Conservative hold		Swing		

=== Valentines ===
Valentines
Party	Candidate	Votes	%	±%
Labour	Ross Hatful	1,822	45.9	+8.9
Labour	Khayer Chowdhury	1,820	45.9	+8.3
Labour	Farah Hussain	1,760	44.3	+8.9
Liberal Democrats	Shoaib Patel	1,477	37.2	−3.4
Liberal Democrats	Farrukh Islam	1,207	30.4	−6.0
Liberal Democrats	Paul Wicks	1,107	27.9	−8.2
Conservative	Atul Sharma	603	15.2	−6.3
Conservative	James Howes	595	15.0	−5.9
Conservative	Sim Chan	500	12.6	−5.1
Green	Gurdeep Sahota	346	8.7	N/A
Independent	Barrymore Scotland	147	3.7	N/A
Turnout		3,969	38.7	
Labour gain from Liberal Democrats		Swing		
Labour hold		Swing		
Labour hold		Swing		

=== Wanstead ===
Wanstead
Party	Candidate	Votes	%	±%
Labour	Sheila Bain	1,964	45.9	+15.2
Labour	Paul Merry	1,739	40.7	+13.4
Conservative	Michelle Dunn	1,692	39.6	+0.5
Labour	Julius Nkafu	1,534	35.9	+6.6
Conservative	Stuart Halstead	1,412	33.0	−4.8
Conservative	Imam Uddin	1,133	26.5	−9.4
Green	Ashley Gunstock	775	18.1	+10.2
UKIP	Lawrence Mendoza	609	14.2	N/A
Liberal Democrats	Janet Cornish	398	9.3	−13.9
Liberal Democrats	Richard Clare	318	7.4	−13.5
Liberal Democrats	Mark Nankivill	185	4.3	−12.6
Turnout		4,277	46.8	
Labour gain from Conservative		Swing		
Labour gain from Conservative		Swing		
Conservative hold		Swing		
