= Fullwell =

- Electoral ward for the Redbridge London Borough Council
- Fullwell ward boundaries since 2018
- Borough: Redbridge
- County: Greater London
- Population: 15,409 (2021)
- Electorate: 11,186 (2022)
- Area: 2.772 square kilometres (1.070 sq mi)

Current electoral ward
- Created: 1978
- Number of members: 3
- Councillors: Sham Islam; Matthew Goddin; Shanell Johnson
- ONS code: 00BCGH (2002–2018)
- GSS code: E05000504 (2002–2018); E05011243 (2018–present)

Fullwell is an electoral ward in the London Borough of Redbridge. The ward was first used in the 1978 elections. It returns councillors to Redbridge London Borough Council. The ward was subject to boundary revisions in 2002 and 2018.

== Redbridge council elections since 2018 ==
There was a revision of ward boundaries in Redbridge in 2018.

=== 2022 election ===
The election took place on 5 May 2022.

2022 Redbridge London Borough Council election: Fullwell
Party	Candidate	Votes	%	±%
Labour	Matthew Goddin	2,105	57.2	▲2.4
Labour	Shanell Johnson	2,016	54.7	▲6.8
Labour	Sham Islam	1,902	51.7	▲1.9
Conservative	Vicky Foster	1,480	40.2	▲2.3
Conservative	Denys Phillips	1,365	37.1	▼0.6
Conservative	Sk Hossain	1,323	36.0	▲2.2
Turnout		3,680	32.9	▼7.7
Labour hold		Swing		
Labour hold		Swing		
Labour hold		Swing		

=== 2018 election ===
The election took place on 3 May 2018.

2018 Redbridge London Borough Council election: Fulwell
Party	Candidate	Votes	%	±%
Labour	Vanisha Solanki	2,432	54.76	N/A
Labour	Sham Islam	2,212	49.81	N/A
Labour	Sadiq Kothia	2,129	47.94	N/A
Conservative	Sanjib Bhattacharjee	1,682	37.87	N/A
Conservative	Jeevah Haran	1,673	37.67	N/A
Conservative	Wesley Manta	1,499	33.75	N/A
Liberal Democrats	Dominic Black	443	9.98	N/A
Turnout		4,441	40.55	
Labour win (new boundaries)				
Labour win (new boundaries)				
Labour win (new boundaries)				

== 2002–2018 Redbridge council elections ==
There was a revision of ward boundaries in Redbridge in 2002.

== 1978–2002 Redbridge council elections ==
=== 1990 election ===
The election took place on 3 May 1990.

=== 1989 by-election ===
The by-election took place on 15 June 1989, following the death of Audrey Toms.

1989 Fullwell by-election
Party	Candidate	Votes	%	±%
Conservative	Malcolm Stilwell	1,615		
Labour	Norman Hilton	911		
Green	Isadore Baker	305		
Liberal Democrats	Rochelle Markovilch	172		
Turnout				
Conservative hold		Swing		
