= Loxford (ward) =

Electoral ward in the London Borough of Redbridge

- Electoral ward for the Redbridge London Borough Council
- Loxford ward boundaries since 2018
- Borough: Redbridge
- County: Greater London
- Population: 15,123 (2021)
- Electorate: 9,137 (2022)
- Major settlements: Loxford
- Area: 1.060 square kilometres (0.409 sq mi)

Current electoral ward
- Created: 1978
- Number of members: 3
- Councillors: Taifur Rashid; Foyzur Rahman; Sahdia Warraich
- ONS code: 00BCGL (2002–2018)
- GSS code: E05000507 (2002–2018); E05011247 (2018–present)

Loxford is an electoral ward in the London Borough of Redbridge. The ward was first used in the 1978 elections. It returns councillors to Redbridge London Borough Council. The ward was subject to boundary revisions in 2002 and 2018.

== Redbridge council elections since 2018 ==
There was a revision of ward boundaries in Redbridge in 2018.

=== 2022 election ===
The election took place on 5 May 2022.

2022 Redbridge London Borough Council election: Loxford
Party	Candidate	Votes	%	±%
Labour	Foyzur Rahman	1,860	77.7	▼1.8
Labour	Sahdia Warraich	1,754	73.3	▼1.6
Labour	Taifur Rashid	1,740	72.7	▲1.6
Conservative	Michael Speakman	434	18.1	▲2.6
Conservative	Sajda Begum	372	15.5	▲0.1
Conservative	Uday Manchu	354	14.8	▲0.4
Turnout		2,393	26.2	▼5.5
Labour hold		Swing		
Labour hold		Swing		
Labour hold		Swing		

=== 2021 by-election ===
The election took place on 3 May 2018.

2018 Redbridge London Borough Council election: Loxford
Party	Candidate	Votes	%	±%
Labour	Chaudhary Iqbal	2,128	75.92	N/A
Labour	Saira Jamil	2,101	74.96	N/A
Labour	Taifur Rashid	1,993	71.10	N/A
Conservative	Lucy Bostick	434	15.48	N/A
Conservative	Hasnain Ahmed	431	15.38	N/A
Conservative	Michael Speakman	425	15.16	N/A
Green	Syed Ali	244	8.70	N/A
Turnout		2,803	31.74	
Labour win (new boundaries)				
Labour win (new boundaries)				
Labour win (new boundaries)				

== 2002–2018 Redbridge council elections ==
There was a revision of ward boundaries in Redbridge in 2002.

== 1978–2002 Redbridge council elections ==
=== 1998 election ===
The election took place on 7 May 1998.

=== 1994 election ===
The election took place on 5 May 1994.

=== 1990 election ===
The election took place on 3 May 1990.

=== 1986 election ===
The election took place on 8 May 1986.

=== 1982 election ===
The election took place on 6 May 1982.

=== 1978 election ===
The election took place on 4 May 1978.
