= Jas Athwal =

British Labour Party politician (born 1963)

Jas Athwal MP
- ਜਸ ਅਠਵਾਲ
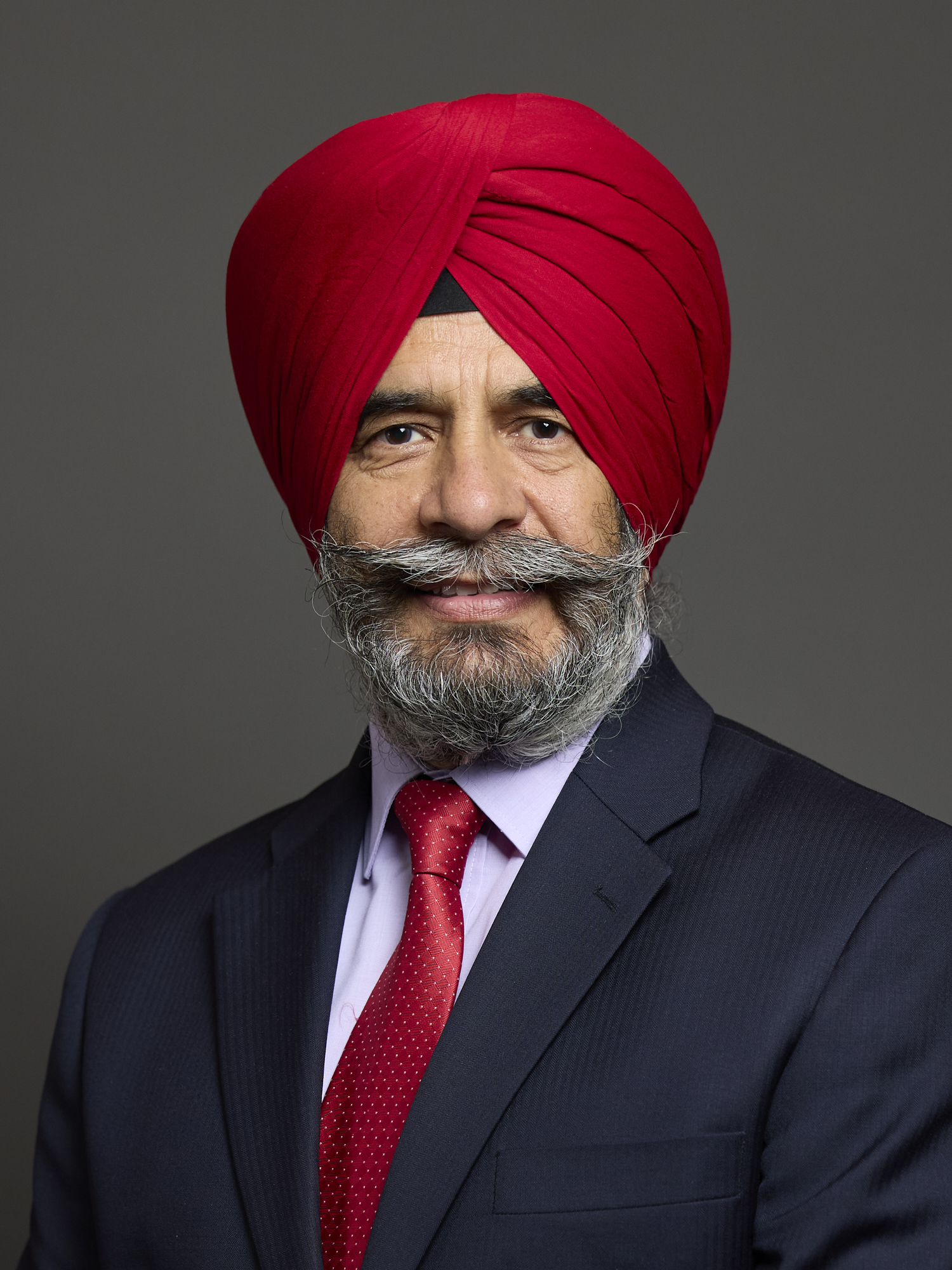
- Official portrait, 2024.

Member of Parliament for Ilford South
- Incumbent
- Assumed office 4 July 2024
- Preceded by: Sam Tarry
- Majority: 6,896 (16.8%)

Leader of Redbridge London Borough Council
- In office 12 June 2014 – 25 July 2024
- Deputy: Kam Rai
- Preceded by: Keith Prince
- Succeeded by: Kam Rai

Member of Redbridge London Borough Council for Mayfield
- In office 6 May 2010 – 25 February 2025

Personal details
- Born: Jasbir Singh Athwal; 7 September 1963 (age 63) Punjab, India
- Party: Labour
- Education: Mayfield School; London School of Economics and Political Science
- Website: jasathwal.com

Jasbir Singh Athwal (Punjabi: ਜਸਬੀਰ ਸਿੰਘ ਅਠਵਾਲ; /ˈdʒæz ˈæθwɒl/; born 1963) is a British Labour Party politician who has been the Member of Parliament (MP) for Ilford South since July 2024. He served as Leader of Redbridge London Borough Council from 2014 to 2024. Athwal currently serves as the Chairman of the All-Party parliamentary group for Sikhs.

== Early life and education ==
Jas Athwal was born in Punjab, India, in September 1963, into a Punjabi Sikh family and is the youngest of three siblings. When Jas was seven, his father relocated to Ilford, in London, England to work at the Ford Motor Company factory in nearby Dagenham, before being joined later by Jas and his mother, neither of whom spoke English upon their arrival to the UK. His mother worked at home sewing ties. He attended Mayfield School in Goodmayes and later graduated from the London School of Economics.

== Early career ==
=== Day nurseries and property ===
In 2007, Athwal co-founded Village Day Nurseries, a business that operates three day nurseries, in Derby, Leigh-on-Sea and Southend-on-Sea respectively, that provide care for up to 300 children under the age of five. Following criticism from Ofsted over breaching child safety rules on three occasions, the nurseries were all ranked "good" by Ofsted when Athwal left the business following his election to Parliament.

Athwal also accumulated a portfolio of properties and in August 2024, Ofsted inspected a private care home operated by Heartwood Care, operating from a building owned by Athwal. Their report rated it inadequate - children from the home had gone missing and been left at risk of criminal exploitation. Reacting to the news, the Conservative Party called for an investigation, with a spokesperson saying: "These are serious allegations, and it would only be right for an investigation to be launched." Heartwood Care later issued a statement denying the allegations. Ofsted returned to the care home for an inspection in November 2024 and updated the care home's rating to "good".

=== Councillor in opposition ===
In the 2010 local elections, Athwal was elected as a Labour councillor for the Mayfield ward on Redbridge London Borough Council, taking the seat from the Conservative Party with a majority of 1368 votes.

Athwal was subsequently elected to lead the Labour Group on Redbridge Council on 11 October 2011, with 15 of the 21 votes. This followed a vote of no confidence in the previous Labour Group Leader, Cllr Bob Littlewood.

In the 2014 local elections, Athwal led the Redbridge Labour Party to win its first ever majority on Redbridge Council, 48 years following the establishment of the borough. His Labour group gained 11 seats, resulting in Labour controlling 35 of the 63 seats, winning control from the incumbent Conservative-Liberal Democrat coalition.

== Leader of Redbridge Council ==
Following the 2014 local elections, Athwal was elected as the Leader of Redbridge Council. Wes Streeting, later elected as Member of Parliament for the local constituency of Ilford North, was his first Deputy Leader.

Following the 2014 local elections, Athwal made council housing a key part of his administration's programme, having built the first new council houses in Redbridge in 10 years. He had a target to build 1000 new affordable homes in an effort to end homelessness in Redbridge. Athwal also actively supported the Dubs amendment for unaccompanied children in Calais and in 2016, visited the Calais "jungle" refugee camp.

At the May 2018 borough elections, Athwal led the Labour Party locally to another victory, securing 51 of the 63 seats. This left the Conservative opposition with 12 councillors and the Liberal Democrats with none. Following the election, Athwal was elected executive member for Crime and Public Protection of London Councils, the local government association that represents London's 32 Borough Councils.

In 2019 a petition was signed by over 3000 residents, in opposition to the Labour administration's plan to build temporary accommodation on the sites of two green spaces in Hainault, in the north of the borough. The plans were introduced in 2018 as a response to Redbridge Council's statutory duty to house 2,300 homeless households, a national reduction in local authority funding, and a consensus that the available hostel accommodation was unsuitable for families. Plans for both sites included preserving and developing the play areas and remaining green space.

=== 2019 general election ===
Shortly before the 2019 general election, Athwal stood to be selected to be the Labour parliamentary candidate for his home constituency of Ilford South, with the incumbent Labour MP Mike Gapes having defected to Change UK. Athwal was suspended from the party on the evening before members were due to vote, on the basis of serious allegations of sexual harassment. Athwal denied the allegations and called for due process. Sam Tarry, Athwal's opponent in the contest, was subsequently selected in a vote a few weeks later. The leader of the Conservative opposition on Redbridge Council urged Athwal to stand down as leader until the matter of his disputed suspension from the Labour Party was resolved. Redbridge Labour Group responded with a statement that "While this process runs its course, Jas Athwal will continue as Leader of Redbridge Council with our full support".

On 15 September 2020, Athwal was cleared of wrongdoing by the Labour Party, and his suspension was lifted. Athwal called for an independent probe into the way that he was suspended on the eve of the selection vote.

=== 2024 general election ===
On 10 October 2022, Athwal was selected as the Labour prospective parliamentary candidate (PPC) for the Ilford South constituency at the 2024 election, defeating the incumbent Sam Tarry, by 499 votes to 361. In April 2024 Tarry submitted a complaint about the vote saying discrepancies in the Labour membership list suggested tampering. The Labour Party investigated the complaint and found no evidence to substantiate Tarry's claims, stating that they had “full confidence” in the integrity of the selection process.

Athwal was elected as MP for Ilford South on 4 July 2024 with a majority of 6,894. He was succeeded as Leader of Redbridge London Borough Council by fellow councillor Kam Rai.

== Parliamentary career ==
Following his election to Parliament, Athwal was elected to roles in a range of All-party parliamentary groups (APPGs), including Chair of the APPG for Sikhs, Chair of the APPG for Obstructive Sleep Apnoea, Vice-Chair of the APPG for Indian Traditional Sciences and Vice-Chair of the APPG for Bioeconomy.

Athwal voted in favour of the Terminally Ill Adults (End of Life) Bill, which proposes to legalise assisted suicide and voted against a Ten Minute Rule motion on the topic of proportional representation.

In February 2026, Athwal initiated a debate in the House of Commons on what he called "unfair" student loans, calling for urgent reforms to England’s student loan system. He urged the government to raise the repayment-income threshold, reduce interest rates and reconsider the use of the Retail Price Index to calculate interest. Athwal has argued that the system disproportionately affected middle-income graduates, whose outstanding balances could continue to increase despite regular repayments, and criticised the government’s decision to freeze the repayment threshold for Plan 2 loans from April 2027. He described the system as being in “urgent need of reform” and said that limited changes would not adequately address concerns about its fairness.

On 11 May 2026, Athwal called on Keir Starmer to resign as prime minister. He nominated Andy Burnham in the subsequent 2026 Labour Party leadership election.

=== Parliament's largest landlord ===
At the time of the 2024 general election, Athwal was the largest landlord in the House of Commons, owning 15 rental flats. Athwal was described as a slum landlord after the BBC reported in August 2024 that he had been renting out "flats with black mould and ant infestations". According to the BBC, almost half of his tenants in one block (of seven flats) reported they had to frequently remove mould from their bathroom ceilings. Another resident told the BBC they had been threatened with eviction by the management agent if they complained about problems. The BBC report also revealed other problems with some of Athwal's rental flats including non-compliance with the required selective property licence, dirty communal areas with lights not working, fire alarms hanging loose from the ceiling and inadequate response to complaints. Prime Minister and Labour leader Keir Starmer said the state of the properties was "unacceptable" and that Athwal should put it right quickly.

Athwal immediately dismissed the managing agent for the properties, saying he was furious for not having been made aware of the problems. Athwal instigated a survey of tenants to discover the problems to be remedied, and said he would reimburse tenants for their out-of-pocket costs.

Housing minister Matthew Pennycook criticised Athwal the following week when he introduced the new Renters (Reform) Bill, saying relying on a letting agent was not sufficient and "Landlords have a responsibility to ensure their properties are well maintained and well managed".

== Personal life ==
Athwal is a practising Sikh. He lives in the Seven Kings area of Ilford, is married and has four children.

Athwal is a supporter of local football club Woodford Town F.C., who in 2020 named the stand at their new ground in Woodford Bridge, the 'Jas Athwal Stand' in recognition of Athwal's contribution to bringing it back to Redbridge.

Parliament of the United Kingdom
Preceded by Sam Tarry	Member of Parliament for Ilford South; 2024–present	Incumbent
