= Valentines (ward) =

Electoral ward in the London Borough of Redbridge

- Electoral ward for the Redbridge London Borough Council
- Valentines ward boundaries since 2018
- Borough: Redbridge
- County: Greater London
- Population: 15,210 (2021)
- Electorate: 10,170 (2022)
- Area: 1.438 square kilometres (0.555 sq mi)

Current electoral ward
- Created: 1978
- Number of members: 3
- Councillors: Khayer Chowdhury; Alex Holmes; Kumud Joshi
- ONS code: 00BCGT (2002–2018)
- GSS code: E05000514 (2002–2018); E05011253 (2018–present)

Valentines is an electoral ward in the London Borough of Redbridge. The ward was first used in the 1978 elections. It returns councillors to Redbridge London Borough Council. The ward was subject to boundary revisions in 2002 and 2018.

== Redbridge council elections since 2018 ==
There was a revision of ward boundaries in Redbridge in 2018.

=== 2022 election ===
The election took place on 5 May 2022.

2022 Redbridge London Borough Council election: Valentines
Party	Candidate	Votes	%	±%
Labour	Khayer Chowdhury	1,833	69.2	▼3.0
Labour	Alex Holmes	1,775	67.1	▼3.5
Labour	Kumud Joshi	1,645	62.1	▼3.5
Conservative	Stephanie Burtt	613	23.2	▲0.2
Conservative	Richard Jackson	563	21.2	▲1.1
Conservative	Michael Bajomo	505	19.1	▲6.0
Ind. Network	Max Reid	295	11.1	▲5.5
Turnout		2,646	26.0	▼5.6
Labour hold		Swing		
Labour hold		Swing		
Labour hold		Swing		

=== 2018 election ===
The election took place on 3 May 2018.

2018 Redbridge London Borough Council election: Valentines
Party	Candidate	Votes	%	±%
Labour	Ross Hatfull	2,317	72.18	N/A
Labour	Khayer Chowdhury	2,267	70.62	N/A
Labour	Farah Hussain	2,105	65.58	N/A
Conservative	Andrew Francis	739	23.02	N/A
Conservative	George Dunkley	645	20.09	N/A
Conservative	Unditi Shubhaker	421	13.12	N/A
Independent	Barrymore Scotland	258	8.04	N/A
Independent	Max Reid	211	6.57	N/A
Turnout		3,210	31.60	
Labour win (new boundaries)				
Labour win (new boundaries)				
Labour win (new boundaries)				

== 2002–2018 Redbridge council elections ==
There was a revision of ward boundaries in Redbridge in 2002.

=== 2010 election ===
The election on 6 May 2010 took place on the same day as the United Kingdom general election.

=== 2009 by-election ===
The by-election took place on 29 January 2009, following the resignation of Nadia Sharif.

2009 Valentines by-election
Party	Candidate	Votes	%	±%
Liberal Democrats	Shoaib Patel	963	36.9	+20.1
Conservative	Ikram Wahid	781	29.9	+10.4
Labour	Surinder Pahl	756	28.9	−0.3
Respect	Abdurahman Jafar	112	4.3	+4.3
Majority		182		
Turnout			29.7	
Liberal Democrats gain from Labour		Swing		

=== 2006 election ===
The election took place on 4 May 2006.

=== 2003 by-election ===
The by-election took place on 24 July 2003, following the death of Gary Scottow.

2003 Valentines by-election
Party	Candidate	Votes	%	±%
Conservative	Suresh Kumar	1,006	37.5	+4.9
Labour	Lesley Hilton	997	37.2	−4.0
Liberal Democrats	George Hogarth	422	15.7	+0.2
CPA	Juliet Hawkins	170	6.3	+6.3
Green	Ashley Gunstock	86	3.2	−7.5
Majority		9	0.3	
Turnout		2,681	29.6	
Conservative gain from Labour		Swing		

== 1978–2002 Redbridge council elections ==
=== 1998 election ===
The election took place on 7 May 1998.

=== 1994 election ===
The election took place on 5 May 1994.

=== 1990 election ===
The election took place on 3 May 1990.

=== 1986 election ===
The election took place on 8 May 1986.

=== 1982 election ===
The election took place on 6 May 1982.

=== 1978 election ===
The election took place on 4 May 1978.
