= 1990 Redbridge London Borough Council election =

1990 local election in England

- 3 May 1990

All 63 seats for election to Redbridge London Borough Council 32 seats needed for a majority
- Registered: 173,071
- Turnout: 83,962, 48.51%

	First party	Second party	Third party
Leader	John R. Lovell	Unknown	Unknown
Party	Conservative	Labour	Liberal Democrats
Leader since	1988	Unknown	Unknown
Leader's seat	Clayhall	Unknown	Unknown
Seats before	45	17	1
Seats won	42	18	3
Seat change	▼3	▲1	▲2
Popular vote	112,689	88,259	23,754
Percentage	48.09%	37.67%	10.06%
Council control before election
Conservative
Council control after election
Conservative

The 1990 Redbridge Council election took place on 3 May 1990 to elect members of Redbridge London Borough Council in London, England. The whole council was up for election and the Conservative party stayed in overall control of the council.

== Election result ==
1990 Redbridge London Borough Council elections
Party	Seats	Gains	Losses	Net gain/loss	Seats %	Votes %	Votes	+/−
Conservative	42	0	3	▼3	66.67	48.09	112,689	
Labour	18 (Note: Includes members listed as Labour and Co-operative Party)	1	0	▲1	28.57	37.67	88,259	
Liberal Democrats	3 (Note: Includes members listed under Lib Dem Focus Team)	2	0	▲2	4.76	10.06	23,574	
Green	0	0	0	Steady	0.00	3.30	7,738	
Residents	0	0	0	Steady	0.00	0.75	1,745	
Independent	0	0	0	Steady	0.00	0.10	244	
Communist	0	0	0	Steady	0.00	0.03	77	
Total	63						234,326	

== Ward results ==
(*) - Indicates an incumbent candidate

(†) - Indicates an incumbent candidate standing in a different ward

=== Aldborough ===
Aldborough (3)
Party	Candidate	Votes	%
Conservative	Graham F. Borrott*	2,038	43.73
Conservative	David G. Jones	1,933	
Conservative	Ernest J. Watts*	1,887	
Labour	Lesley R. Hilton	1,691	35.89
Labour	Rosemary Y. Keery	1,658	
Labour	Mohammad Kahn	1,461	
Green	Timothy Marshall	515	11.53
Liberal Democrats	Veronica M. Roach	395	8.84
Registered electors		8,645	
Turnout		4,241	49.06
Rejected ballots		1	0.02
Conservative hold			
Conservative hold			
Conservative hold			

=== Barkingside ===
Barkingside (3)
Party	Candidate	Votes	%
Conservative	Keith E. Axon*	2,445	50.88
Conservative	Thomas F. Cobb*	2,390	
Conservative	Roy W. Brunnen*	2,389	
Labour	Ronald M. Belkin	1,442	28.59
Labour	Alexander H. Patchett	1,312	
Labour	Wendy F. Hollands	1,306	
Liberal Democrats	Trisha Ambrose	375	7.92
Green	Andrew E.C. Ellis	353	7.46
Independent	Brian C. Couzens	244	5.15
Registered electors		9,643	
Turnout		4,421	45.85
Rejected ballots		1	0.02
Conservative hold			
Conservative hold			
Conservative hold			

=== Bridge ===
Bridge (3)
Party	Candidate	Votes	%
Conservative	Geoffrey H. Brewer*	2,180	46.64
Conservative	David J. Burbridge*	2,154	
Conservative	Tak L. Chan	2,040	
Labour	Coral B. Jackson	1,588	33.98
Labour	Martin Sachs	1,559	
Labour	Mary E. Tuffin	1,498	
Green	Lawrence R. Hackwell	507	11.13
Liberal Democrats	Ralph N. Stevens	405	8.25
Liberal Democrats	Verona Marfo	347	
Registered electors		8,745	
Turnout		4,360	49.86
Rejected ballots		3	0.07
Conservative hold			
Conservative hold			
Conservative hold			

=== Chadwell ===
Chadwell (3)
Party	Candidate	Votes	%
Conservative	Robert A. Cole*	2,237	48.11
Conservative	Christopher F. Annal^{†} (Note: Annal was a sitting councillor representing the Cranbrook ward)	2,182	
Conservative	Laurence N. Davies	2,100	
Labour	Teresa J. Conway	1,581	33.25
Labour	Christopher W. MacCarthy	1,501	
Labour	Josephine Spink	1,424	
Lib Dem Focus Team	David Green	506	10.34
Lib Dem Focus Team	Dominic J.D. Black	453	
Lib Dem Focus Team	Frank A.S. Marsh	442	
Green	Carol Small	375	8.30
Registered electors		9,364	
Turnout		4,549	48.58
Rejected ballots		5	0.11
Conservative hold			
Conservative hold			
Conservative hold			

=== Church End ===
Church End (3)
Party	Candidate	Votes	%
Lib Dem Focus Team	Maureen J. Hoskins*	1,945	46.48
Lib Dem Focus Team	Richard H. Hoskins	1,762	
Lib Dem Focus Team	Hugh R. Cleaver	1,715	
Conservative	Leslie G. Bridgeman*	1,549	39.51
Conservative	Morris Hickey*	1,547	
Conservative	Philippa J. Stone	1,513	
Labour	Peter A. Bradley	578	14.01
Labour	Susan P. Kean	545	
Labour	Simon Green	511	
Registered electors		7,607	
Turnout		4,031	52.99
Rejected ballots		6	0.15
Lib Dem Focus Team gain from Conservative			
Lib Dem Focus Team gain from Conservative			
Lib Dem Focus Team hold			

=== Clayhall ===
Clayhall (3)
Party	Candidate	Votes	%
Conservative	Alan E. Weinberg*	2,708	62.36
Conservative	Ronald I. Barden*	2,695	
Conservative	John R. Lovell^{†} (Note: Lovell was a sitting councillor representing the Aldborough ward)	2,649	
Labour	Brenda E. Fish	1,093	24.33
Labour	Norman A. Hilton	1,036	
Labour	John R. Mabey	1,011	
Liberal Democrats	Sidney A. Cohen	346	7.39
Liberal Democrats	Mollie Bradbury	307	
Liberal Democrats	Susan D. Hamlyn	300	
Green	Reginal E. George	255	5.92
Registered electors		9,447	
Turnout		4,415	46.73
Rejected ballots		6	0.14
Conservative hold			
Conservative hold			
Conservative hold			

=== Clementswood ===
Clementswood (3)
Party	Candidate	Votes	%
Labour	John H. Hogben*	2,041	54.83
Labour	Jacqueline Woodside	1,913	
Labour	Faiz A. Noor	1,898	
Conservative	Malcolm S. Bush	1,100	29.09
Conservative	Mark Seymour	1,024	
Conservative	Mohammed I. Butt	981	
Green	Alison A. Gardiner	304	8.54
Liberal Democrats	Andrew D. Bond	302	7.53
Liberal Democrats	Stephen H. Newsham	272	
Liberal Democrats	John P. Chynoweth	229	
Registered electors		8,146	
Turnout		3,650	44.81
Rejected ballots		6	0.16
Labour hold			
Labour hold			
Labour hold			

=== Cranbrook ===
Cranbrook (3)
Party	Candidate	Votes	%
Conservative	Arnold Kinzley*	1,859	43.71
Conservative	Charles Elliman	1,855	
Conservative	Azaf B. Mirza	1,813	
Labour	Anne J. Mallach	1,272	29.43
Labour	Joseph B. Hoedemaker	1,251	
Labour	Kenneth M. Turner	1,197	
Residents	Derek J. Moul	605	13.81
Residents	Paul R. Alvarez	604	
Residents	David A. Johnson	536	
Green	George W. Bush	326	7.74
Liberal Democrats	Robert K. Boulton	243	5.31
Liberal Democrats	John M. Collis	204	
Registered electors		7,614	
Turnout		4,148	54.48
Rejected ballots		0	0.00
Conservative hold			
Conservative hold			
Conservative hold			

=== Fairlop ===
Fairlop (3)
Party	Candidate	Votes	%
Conservative	Albert L. Finch*	2,094	46.50
Conservative	Michael J. Higgins	2,038	
Conservative	Joyce E. Ryan	2,011	
Labour	Guys S. Beaumont	1,571	35.20
Labour	Jerem Smith	1,550	
Labour	Maxine S. Edney	1,528	
Green	Laurence I. Freedman	452	10.26
Liberal Democrats	Kathleen M. Black	354	8.04
Liberal Democrats	Peter W. Briggs	354	
Registered electors		8,586	
Turnout		4,265	49.67
Rejected ballots		3	0.07
Conservative hold			
Conservative hold			
Conservative hold			

=== Fullwell ===
Fullwell (3)
Party	Candidate	Votes	%
Conservative	Dennis S. Candy*	2,113	52.59
Conservative	Anthony A. Bramwell*	2,062	
Conservative	Malcolm W. Stilwell	2,031	
Labour	Marcelle P. Belkin	1,214	29.36
Labour	Sidney A. Hollands	1,150	
Labour	Martin C. Lodemore	1,100	
Green	Simons S. Cramp	420	10.68
Liberal Democrats	David W. Black	314	7.37
Liberal Democrats	James M. Swallow	266	
Registered electors		8,603	
Turnout		3,805	44.23
Rejected ballots		4	0.11
Conservative hold			
Conservative hold			
Conservative hold			

=== Goodmayes ===
Goodmayes (3)
Party	Candidate	Votes	%
Labour	John W. Fairley-Churchill	2,132	56.06
Labour Co-op	Michael J. Fitzmaurice*	1,889	
Labour Co-op	Paul F. Jeater*	1,833	
Conservative	John Atkins	985	27.67
Conservative	Raymond C. Haines	961	
Conservative	Thomas D.H. Merryweather	942	
Green	Leo M.J. Fletcher	310	8.91
Liberal Democrats	Eileen R. Clark	270	7.36
Liberal Democrats	Philip T. Clark	266	
Liberal Democrats	Amelia M. Olive	233	
Registered electors		8,486	
Turnout		3,511	41.37
Rejected ballots		4	0.11
Labour hold			
Labour Co-op hold			
Labour Co-op hold			

=== Hainault ===
Hainault (3)
Party	Candidate	Votes	%
Labour	Alan T. Hughes*	1,893	51.40
Labour	Linda Perham	1,800	
Labour	Peter G. McEwen*	1,779	
Conservative	Douglas J. Campbell	1,062	29.87
Conservative	Terry C. Montague	1,062	
Conservative	Michael J. Borrott	1,056	
Green	Emma Fletcher	343	9.66
Liberal Democrats	Leslie M. Everest	322	9.07
Registered electors		7,264	
Turnout		3,497	48.14
Rejected ballots		1	0.03
Labour hold			
Labour hold			
Labour hold			

=== Loxford ===
Loxford (3)
Party	Candidate	Votes	%
Labour	Muhammed Javed*	2,450	63.15
Labour	Jeffery Edelman	2,103	
Labour	Sidney Middleburgh	2,074	
Conservative	Adalat R. Khan	840	23.10
Conservative	James F. Howes	805	
Conservative	Pakiza Baig	779	
Green	Marie P. Bushell	273	7.80
Liberal Democrats	Adrian J. Mitchell	224	5.95
Liberal Democrats	Audrey V. Brien	209	
Liberal Democrats	Helen F. Glanfield	191	
Registered electors		8,389	
Turnout		3,730	44.46
Rejected ballots		2	0.05
Labour hold			
Labour hold			
Labour hold			

=== Mayfield ===
Mayfield (3)
Party	Candidate	Votes	%
Conservative	Constance M. Bamford*	2,046	46.03
Conservative	Trevor Grant*	1,936	
Conservative	Roland B.R. Hill*	1,909	
Labour	Adrian Clements	1,704	37.97
Labour	Walter F.D. Maclean	1,620	
Labour	Ronald P. Madell	1,537	
Lib Dem Focus Team	Stanley A. Colyer	418	9.09
Lib Dem Focus Team	Ralph J. Scott	392	
Lib Dem Focus Team	Dennis Robertson	354	
Green	Ruth Elberg	295	6.91
Registered electors		8,578	
Turnout		4,339	50.58
Rejected ballots		3	0.07
Conservative hold			
Conservative hold			
Conservative hold			

=== Monkhams ===
Monkhams (3)
Party	Candidate	Votes	%
Conservative	Nancy H. Thurgood*	2,692	68.35
Conservative	Louise R. Hyams*	2,671	
Conservative	Gilbert B. Seymour*	2,637	
Labour	Daphne Griffith	571	14.27
Labour	Alan P. Barnett	569	
Labour	Philip J. Pollard	531	
Liberal Democrats	Daniel G. Hoskins	411	9.51
Liberal Democrats	Susan Skinner	363	
Liberal Democrats	Michael J. McElarney	338	
Green	Helen J. Davis	307	7.87
Registered electors		7,710	
Turnout		3,852	49.96
Rejected ballots		3	0.08
Conservative hold			
Conservative hold			
Conservative hold			

=== Newbury ===
Newbury (3)
Party	Candidate	Votes	%
Conservative	Harold W. Moth*	1,793	41.65
Conservative	Glenn C. Corfield	1,723	
Conservative	John J.M. Smith	1,649	
Labour	Brian Myers	1,623	36.77
Labour	Maganbhai G. Patel	1,482	
Labour	Dev R. Sharma	1,456	
Green	Stephen P. Lesslie	467	11.30
Liberal Democrats	Paul D. Dyer	463	10.28
Liberal Democrats	Allan M. Wright	386	
Registered electors		8,092	
Turnout		3,980	49.18
Rejected ballots		6	0.15
Conservative hold			
Conservative hold			
Conservative hold			

=== Roding ===
Roding (3)
Party	Candidate	Votes	%
Conservative	Anthony J. Loffhagen*	1,968	47.91
Conservative	Hazel I. Weinberg	1,959	
Conservative	Reginald J. Woda	1,890	
Lib Dem Focus Team	Everald A. Shortell	1,015	24.49
Lib Dem Focus Team	Gareth L.P. Wilson	1,010	
Lib Dem Focus Team	John P. Swallow	949	
Labour	Henry J. Garratt	721	16.38
Labour	Ian C. Peacock	686	
Labour	Manubhai I. Patel	582	
Green	Tracey J. Read	377	9.32
Communist	Laurence C. Laughlin	77	1.90
Registered electors		8,051	
Turnout		3,960	49.19
Rejected ballots		9	0.23
Conservative hold			
Conservative hold			
Conservative hold			

=== Seven Kings ===
Seven Kings (3)
Party	Candidate	Votes	%
Labour	Resham S. Mann	2,005	50.79
Labour	Elizabeth A. Pearce	1,985	
Labour	Provat T. Das Gupta*	1,885	
Conservative	Vanessa C. Cole	1,554	36.24
Conservative	Stanley D. Pethers	1,406	
Conservative	Darshan K. Sharma	1,232	
Green	Minakshi Sharma	500	12.97
Registered electors		7,802	
Turnout		3,859	49.46
Rejected ballots		3	0.08
Labour hold			
Labour hold			
Labour gain from Conservative			

=== Snaresbrook ===
Snaresbrook (3)
Party	Candidate	Votes	%
Conservative	Peter R. Goody*	2,188	52.14
Conservative	Winifred J. Roberts*	2,143	
Conservative	Frank A. Melvin*	2,125	
Labour	Gregor J. Eglin	1,334	30.94
Labour	Marian L. Forster	1,317	
Labour	John A. Smith	1,181	
Green	Francis M. Roads	390	9.45
Liberal Democrats	Alison E. McBrayne	312	7.46
Liberal Democrats	Malcolm J. New	303	
Registered electors		7,672	
Turnout		3,987	51.97
Rejected ballots		3	0.08
Conservative hold			
Conservative hold			
Conservative hold			

=== Valentines ===
Valentines (3)
Party	Candidate	Votes	%
Labour	Tejinder M.S. Ajiz*	1,487	46.04
Labour	John D. Brindley	1,476	
Labour	Andrew M.D. Whyte	1,340	
Conservative	Bashir A. Chaudry	1,181	34.80
Conservative	Keith R. Langford	1,061	
Conservative	Roseanne Serrelli	1,009	
Lib Dem Focus Team	George G. Hogarth	717	19.16
Lib Dem Focus Team	Rochelle L. Markovitch	554	
Lib Dem Focus Team	Thomas D.J. Dommett	520	
Registered electors		7,363	
Turnout		3,462	47.02
Rejected ballots		6	0.17
Labour hold			
Labour hold			
Labour hold			

=== Wanstead ===
Wanstead (3)
Party	Candidate	Votes	%
Conservative	John C. Allan*	2,011	42.32
Conservative	Allan C. Burgess	1,975	
Conservative	Thomas C.W. Howl	1,822	
Labour	Margret E. Edelman	997	19.91
Green	Mark Kinzley	969	21.18
Labour	Allan W. Tuffin	884	
Labour	Kenneth R. Winger	853	
Liberal Democrats	John C. Banks	814	16.59
Liberal Democrats	Philip J. Knight	704	
Registered electors		7,264	
Turnout		3,900	53.69
Rejected ballots		5	0.13
Conservative hold			
Conservative hold			
Conservative hold			

== By-elections ==
The following by-elections took place between the 1990 and 1994 elections:

- 1993 Cranbrook by-election
- 1993 Monkhams by-election
