= 1986 Redbridge London Borough Council election =

1986 local election in England

The 1986 Redbridge Council election took place on 8 May 1986 to elect members of Redbridge London Borough Council in London, England. The whole council was up for election and the Conservative party stayed in overall control of the council.

== Ward results ==
=== Aldborough ===
Aldborough (3)
Party	Candidate	Votes	%	±%
Conservative	Ernest Watts	1,703		
Conservative	John Lovell	1,700		
Conservative	Graham Borrott	1,694		
Labour	John Coombes	1,400		
Labour	Robert Costley	1,277		
Labour	Charles Ellett	1,235		
Alliance	Thomas Kitchener	510		
Alliance	Avrom Pearl	476		
Alliance	Alastair Wilson	468		
Turnout				
Conservative hold		Swing		
Conservative hold		Swing		
Conservative hold		Swing		

=== Barkingside ===
Barkingside (4)
Party	Candidate	Votes	%	±%

=== Bridge ===
Bridge (4)
Party	Candidate	Votes	%	±%

=== Chadwell ===
Chadwell (4)
Party	Candidate	Votes	%	±%

=== Church End ===
Church End (4)
Party	Candidate	Votes	%	±%

=== Clayhall ===
Clayhall (3)
Party	Candidate	Votes	%	±%

=== Clementswood ===
Clementswood (3)
Party	Candidate	Votes	%	±%

=== Cranbrook ===
Cranbrook (4)
Party	Candidate	Votes	%	±%

=== Fairlop ===
Fairlop (3)
Party	Candidate	Votes	%	±%

=== Fullwell ===
Fullwell (3)
Party	Candidate	Votes	%	±%

=== Goodmayes ===
Goodmayes (3)
Party	Candidate	Votes	%	±%

=== Hainault ===
Hainault (3)
Party	Candidate	Votes	%	±%
Labour	Alan Hughes	1,779		
Labour	David Jones	1,758		
Labour	Peter McEwen	1,672		
Conservative	Bernice Benton	805		
Conservative	Christine Knight	764		
Conservative	Ali Qureshi	600		
Alliance	Peter Briggs	463		
Alliance	Margaret Clarke	444		
Alliance	Laurence Porter	397		
Turnout				
Labour hold		Swing		
Labour hold		Swing		
Labour hold		Swing		

=== Loxford ===
Loxford (3)
Party	Candidate	Votes	%	±%

=== Mayfield ===
Mayfield (4)
Party	Candidate	Votes	%	±%
Conservative	Trevor Grant	2,008		
Conservative	Constance Bamford	1,968		
Conservative	Roland Hill	1,941		
Labour	Allen Maclean	1,405		
Labour	Walter Maclean	1,323		
Labour	Gwyneth Phillips	1,195		
Alliance	Stanley Colyer	510		
Alliance	Frank Marsh	425		
Alliance	Ronald Mavers	406		
Turnout				
Conservative hold		Swing		
Conservative hold		Swing		
Conservative hold		Swing		

=== Monkhams ===
Monkhams (3)
Party	Candidate	Votes	%	±%

=== Newbury ===
Newbury (3)
Party	Candidate	Votes	%	±%

=== Roding ===
Roding (3)
Party	Candidate	Votes	%	±%

=== Seven Kings ===
Seven Kings (4)
Party	Candidate	Votes	%	±%

=== Snaresbrook ===
Snaresbrook (4)
Party	Candidate	Votes	%	±%

=== Valentines ===
Valentines (3)
Party	Candidate	Votes	%	±%

=== Wanstead ===
Wanstead (4)
Party	Candidate	Votes	%	±%

== By-elections ==
The following by-elections took place between the 1986 and 1990 elections:

- 1987 Roding by-election
- 1989 Hainault by-election
- 1989 Fullwell by-election
