= 1974 Redbridge London Borough Council election =

← 1971	2 May 1974	1978 →

All 60 Redbridge London Borough Council seats 31 seats needed for a majority

The 1974 Redbridge Council election took place on 2 May 1974 to elect members of Redbridge London Borough Council in London, England. The whole council was up for election and the Conservative party stayed in overall control of the council.

== Ward results ==
=== Aldborough ===
Aldborough (3)
Party	Candidate	Votes	%	±%
Conservative	G. Borrott	1,815		
Conservative	E. Watts	1,804		
Conservative	J. Lovell	1,796		
Labour	W. Axon	1,390		
Labour	R. Belkin	1,372		
Labour	H. Lewis	1,348		
Liberal	J. Davis	488		
Liberal	M. Davies	484		
Liberal	B. Freeman	451		
Turnout				
Conservative gain from Labour		Swing		
Conservative hold		Swing		
Conservative hold		Swing		

=== Barkingside ===
Barkingside (4)
Party	Candidate	Votes	%	±%

=== Bridge ===
Bridge (4)
Party	Candidate	Votes	%	±%

=== Chadwell ===
Chadwell (4)
Party	Candidate	Votes	%	±%

=== Clayhall ===
Clayhall (3)
Party	Candidate	Votes	%	±%

=== Clementswood ===
Clementswood (3)
Party	Candidate	Votes	%	±%

=== Cranbrook ===
Cranbrook (4)
Party	Candidate	Votes	%	±%

=== Fairlop ===
Fairlop (3)
Party	Candidate	Votes	%	±%
Labour	B. Davies	1,610		
Labour	H. Kober	1,544		
Labour	A. Tapper	1,525		
Conservative	T. Jacobs	1,425		
Conservative	M. Kirrage	1,380		
Conservative	P. McDonnell	1,371		
Liberal	P. Briggs	552		
Liberal	G. Seabridge	545		
Liberal	V. Schuman	542		
Turnout				
Labour hold		Swing		
Labour hold		Swing		
Labour hold		Swing		

=== Goodmayes ===
Goodmayes (3)
Party	Candidate	Votes	%	±%

=== Hainault ===
Hainault (3)
Party	Candidate	Votes	%	±%

=== Ilford ===
Ilford (3)
Party	Candidate	Votes	%	±%
Labour	K. Axon	1,396		
Labour	M. Batton	1,378		
Labour	S. Mather	1,279		
Conservative	A. Branscombe	661		
Conservative	P. Cottrell	651		
Conservative	P. Crellin	626		
Residents	P. Kavanagh	301		
Liberal	J. Boxell	277		
Liberal	D. Jackson	232		
Liberal	J. Alexander	231		
Turnout				
Labour hold		Swing		
Labour hold		Swing		
Labour hold		Swing		

=== Mayfield ===
Mayfield (4)
Party	Candidate	Votes	%	±%
Conservative	J. Jones	2,059		
Conservative	Roland Hill	2,051		
Conservative	H. Pearce	2,040		
Conservative	Bert Barker	2,024		
Labour	Charles Burgess	1,477		
Labour	D. Cunningham	1,460		
Labour	R. Hutton	1,407		
Labour	J. O'Reilly	1,401		
Liberal	J. Boden	422		
Liberal	Bernard Boon	422		
Liberal	R. Farrow	397		
Liberal	M. Way	386		
Turnout				
Conservative hold		Swing		
Conservative hold		Swing		
Conservative hold		Swing		
Conservative hold		Swing		

=== Park ===
Park (3)
Party	Candidate	Votes	%	±%
Conservative	J. Smith	1,431		
Conservative	C. Annal	1,418		
Conservative	A. Toms	1,384		
Labour	J. Blay	980		
Labour	S. Marchant	971		
Labour	D. Fenton	966		
Liberal	J. Newland	428		
Liberal	M. Newman	404		
Liberal	P. Wright	377		
Communist	M. Woddis	106		
Turnout				
Conservative hold		Swing		
Conservative hold		Swing		
Conservative hold		Swing		

=== Seven Kings ===
Seven Kings (4)
Party	Candidate	Votes	%	±%

=== Snaresbrook ===
Snaresbrook (4)
Party	Candidate	Votes	%	±%

=== Wanstead ===
Wanstead (4)
Party	Candidate	Votes	%	±%

=== Woodford ===
Woodford (4)
Party	Candidate	Votes	%	±%
Conservative	Fred Mountier	3,616		
Conservative	N. Thurgood	3,583		
Conservative	David Evennett	3,577		
Conservative	H. Nicholson	3,554		
Liberal	D. Gilby	903		
Liberal	D. Blackett	828		
Liberal	A. Griffiths	793		
Liberal	G. Goldberg	772		
Labour	P. Pollard	576		
Labour	V. Pollard	564		
Labour	J. Haworth	550		
Labour	T. McKellar	531		
Turnout				
Conservative hold		Swing		
Conservative hold		Swing		
Conservative hold		Swing		
Conservative hold		Swing		

== By-elections ==
The following by-elections took place between the 1974 and 1978 elections:

- 1974 Clayhall by-election
- 1975 Snaresbrook by-election
- 1975 Woodford by-election
- 1976 Mayfield by-election
- 1976 Wanstead by-election
- 1977 Fairlop by-election
