= 1982 Redbridge London Borough Council election =

The 1982 Redbridge Council election took place on 6 May 1982 to elect members of Redbridge London Borough Council in London, England. The whole council was up for election and the Conservative party stayed in overall control of the council.

== Ward results ==
=== Aldborough ===
Aldborough (3)
Party	Candidate	Votes	%	±%
Conservative	John Lovell	2,077		
Conservative	Graham Borrett	2,041		
Conservative	Ernest Watts	2,036		
Labour	John Coombes	1,018		
Labour	Brenda Lee	973		
Labour	David Whittaker	953		
Alliance	Alastair Wilson	621		
Alliance	Thomas Kitchener	615		
Alliance	Lesley Wilson	567		
Turnout				
Conservative hold		Swing		
Conservative hold		Swing		
Conservative hold		Swing		

=== Barkingside ===
Barkingside (4)
Party	Candidate	Votes	%	±%

=== Bridge ===
Bridge (4)
Party	Candidate	Votes	%	±%

=== Chadwell ===
Chadwell (4)
Party	Candidate	Votes	%	±%

=== Church End ===
Church End (4)
Party	Candidate	Votes	%	±%

=== Clayhall ===
Clayhall (3)
Party	Candidate	Votes	%	±%

=== Clementswood ===
Clementswood (3)
Party	Candidate	Votes	%	±%

=== Cranbrook ===
Cranbrook (4)
Party	Candidate	Votes	%	±%

=== Fairlop ===
Fairlop (3)
Party	Candidate	Votes	%	±%

=== Fullwell ===
Fullwell (3)
Party	Candidate	Votes	%	±%

=== Goodmayes ===
Goodmayes (3)
Party	Candidate	Votes	%	±%

=== Hainault ===
Hainault (3)
Party	Candidate	Votes	%	±%
Labour	George Davies	1,438		
Labour	Alan Hughes	1,420		
Labour	Raymond Clark	1,406		
Conservative	David Edmonds	1,063		
Conservative	Douglas Herbert	1,050		
Conservative	Sydney Stevens	1,038		
Alliance	Ernest Quilter	487		
Alliance	Lily Smith	472		
Alliance	Peter Briggs			
Turnout				
Labour hold		Swing		
Labour hold		Swing		
Labour hold		Swing		

=== Loxford ===
Loxford (3)
Party	Candidate	Votes	%	±%

=== Mayfield ===
Mayfield (4)
Party	Candidate	Votes	%	±%
Conservative	Anthony Day	2,730		
Conservative	David Amess	2,698		
Conservative	Roland Hill	2,651		
Labour	Victor Bourne	944		
Labour	Paul Jeater	894		
Labour	Bernard Lipman	888		
Alliance	Charles Burgess	711		
Alliance	Peter Smith	584		
Alliance	Freda Marks	581		
Turnout				
Conservative hold		Swing		
Conservative hold		Swing		
Conservative hold		Swing		

=== Monkhams ===
Monkhams (3)
Party	Candidate	Votes	%	±%

=== Newbury ===
Newbury (3)
Party	Candidate	Votes	%	±%

=== Roding ===
Roding (3)
Party	Candidate	Votes	%	±%

=== Seven Kings ===
Seven Kings (4)
Party	Candidate	Votes	%	±%

=== Snaresbrook ===
Snaresbrook (4)
Party	Candidate	Votes	%	±%

=== Valentines ===
Valentines (3)
Party	Candidate	Votes	%	±%

=== Wanstead ===
Wanstead (4)
Party	Candidate	Votes	%	±%

== By-elections ==
The following by-elections took place between the 1982 and 1986 elections:

- 1983 Newbury by-election
- February 1984 Chadwell by-election
- 1984 Mayfield by-election
- 1984 Hainault by-election
- December 1984 Chadwell by-election
