= 1978 Redbridge London Borough Council election =

The 1978 Redbridge Council election took place on 4 May 1978 to elect members of Redbridge London Borough Council in London, England. The whole council was up for election and the Conservative party stayed in overall control of the council.

== Ward results ==
=== Aldborough ===
Aldborough (3)
Party	Candidate	Votes	%	±%
Conservative	John Lovell	2,039		
Conservative	Graham Borrott	2,024		
Conservative	Ernest Watts	2,010		
Labour	Walter Finesilver	1,350		
Labour	Alan Hughes	1,329		
Labour	John Ryder	1,251		
Liberal	Andrew Barnett	203		
Liberal	Philip Ximenez	155		
Turnout				
Conservative win (new boundaries)				
Conservative win (new boundaries)				
Conservative win (new boundaries)				

=== Barkingside ===
Barkingside (4)
Party	Candidate	Votes	%	±%

=== Bridge ===
Bridge (4)
Party	Candidate	Votes	%	±%

=== Chadwell ===
Chadwell (4)
Party	Candidate	Votes	%	±%

=== Church End ===
Church End (4)
Party	Candidate	Votes	%	±%

=== Clayhall ===
Clayhall (3)
Party	Candidate	Votes	%	±%

=== Clementswood ===
Clementswood (3)
Party	Candidate	Votes	%	±%

=== Cranbrook ===
Cranbrook (4)
Party	Candidate	Votes	%	±%

=== Fairlop ===
Fairlop (3)
Party	Candidate	Votes	%	±%

=== Fullwell ===
Fullwell (3)
Party	Candidate	Votes	%	±%

=== Goodmayes ===
Goodmayes (3)
Party	Candidate	Votes	%	±%

=== Hainault ===
Hainault (3)
Party	Candidate	Votes	%	±%
Labour	Timothy Ridoutt	1,882		
Labour	George Davies	1,823		
Labour	Glen Jarman	1,814		
Conservative	Sydney Stevens	1,116		
Conservative	Douglas Herbert	1,080		
Conservative	Trevor Thomas	1,068		
National Front	John Hughes	199		
National Front	Gilbert Jennings	179		
Liberal	John Delves	159		
National Front	Frederick King	146		
Liberal	Stuart McDougall	98		
Communist	James Burns	78		
Turnout				
Labour win (new boundaries)				
Labour win (new boundaries)				
Labour win (new boundaries)				

=== Loxford ===
Loxford (3)
Party	Candidate	Votes	%	±%

=== Mayfield ===
Mayfield (4)
Party	Candidate	Votes	%	±%
Conservative	Phillis Cottrell	2,417		
Conservative	Roland Hill	2,353		
Conservative	Lucette Smith	2,277		
Labour	Charles Burgess	1,141		
Labour	Christopher Blackwell	1,054		
Labour	Frances Payne	1,038		
Liberal	Bernard Boon	234		
Liberal	Hugh Kenna	202		
Liberal	Robert Newland	200		
Turnout				
Conservative win (new boundaries)				
Conservative win (new boundaries)				
Conservative win (new boundaries)				

=== Monkhams ===
Monkhams (3)
Party	Candidate	Votes	%	±%

=== Newbury ===
Newbury (3)
Party	Candidate	Votes	%	±%

=== Roding ===
Roding (3)
Party	Candidate	Votes	%	±%

=== Seven Kings ===
Seven Kings (4)
Party	Candidate	Votes	%	±%

=== Snaresbrook ===
Snaresbrook (4)
Party	Candidate	Votes	%	±%

=== Valentines ===
Valentines (3)
Party	Candidate	Votes	%	±%

=== Wanstead ===
Wanstead (4)
Party	Candidate	Votes	%	±%

== By-elections ==
The following by-elections took place between the 1978 and 1982 elections:

- 1978 Seven Kings by-election
- 1980 Seven Kings by-election (Labour gain from Conservative)
- 1980 Goodmayes by-election
- 1981 Hainault by-election
