= 1971 Redbridge London Borough Council election =

← 1968	13 May 1971	1974 →

All 60 Redbridge London Borough Council seats 31 seats needed for a majority

The 1971 Redbridge Council election took place on 13 May 1971 to elect members of Redbridge London Borough Council in London, England. The whole council was up for election and the Conservative party stayed in overall control of the council.

== Ward results ==
=== Aldborough ===
Aldborough (3)
Party	Candidate	Votes	%	±%
Labour	J. Smith	1,519		
Conservative	R. Chapman	1,496		
Conservative	E. Watts	1,481		
Labour	M. Roderick	1471		
Conservative	J. Savage	1460		
Labour	K. Axon	1416		
Liberal	J. Hewitt	172		
Liberal	R. Price	172		
Liberal	V. Shuman	158		
Independent	C. Giles	152		
Turnout				
Labour gain from Conservative		Swing		
Conservative hold		Swing		
Conservative hold		Swing		

=== Barkingside ===
Barkingside (4)
Party	Candidate	Votes	%	±%

=== Bridge ===
Bridge (4)
Party	Candidate	Votes	%	±%

=== Chadwell ===
Chadwell (4)
Party	Candidate	Votes	%	±%

=== Clayhall ===
Clayhall (3)
Party	Candidate	Votes	%	±%

=== Clementswood ===
Clementswood (3)
Party	Candidate	Votes	%	±%

=== Cranbrook ===
Cranbrook (4)
Party	Candidate	Votes	%	±%

=== Fairlop ===
Fairlop (3)
Party	Candidate	Votes	%	±%
Labour	B. Davies	1,934		
Labour	H. Kober	1,791		
Labour	A. Tapper	1,746		
Conservative	A. Follows	1,323		
Conservative	I. Cameron	1,295		
Conservative	K. Harvey	1,260		
Liberal	J. Graham	298		
Liberal	R. Scott	275		
Liberal	D. Swindell	261		
Turnout				
Labour gain from Conservative		Swing		
Labour gain from Conservative		Swing		
Labour gain from Conservative		Swing		

=== Goodmayes ===
Goodmayes (3)
Party	Candidate	Votes	%	±%

=== Hainault ===
Hainault (3)
Party	Candidate	Votes	%	±%
Labour	George Davies	3,296		
Labour	Glen Jarman	3,251		
Labour	J. Ryder	3,173		
Conservative	J. Sweeney	722		
Conservative	S. Rose	710		
Conservative	R. Westrip	680		
Liberal	E. Flack	273		
Liberal	D. Lawrence	172		
Liberal	S. Wicks	157		
Communist	T. Ling	75		
Turnout				
Labour hold		Swing		
Labour hold		Swing		
Labour hold		Swing		

=== Ilford ===
Ilford (3)
Party	Candidate	Votes	%	±%
Labour	P. Connellan	1,734		
Labour	H. Lewis	1,660		
Labour	L. Emons	1,629		
Conservative	M. Clark	840		
Conservative	P. Cottrell	815		
Conservative	D. Perril	782		
Liberal	J. Newland	168		
Liberal	D. Jackson	159		
Liberal	A. Train	152		
National Front	W. Bouverie	121		
Communist	G. Devine	91		
Turnout				
Labour gain from Conservative		Swing		
Labour gain from Conservative		Swing		
Labour gain from Conservative		Swing		

=== Mayfield ===
Mayfield (4)
Party	Candidate	Votes	%	±%
Conservative	D. Latham	2,189		
Conservative	Bert Barker	2,174		
Conservative	H. Pearce	2,170		
Conservative	Roland Hill	2,140		
Labour	Charles Burgess	1,630		
Labour	D. Cunningham	1,584		
Labour	C. Pyke	1,529		
Labour	B. Vadher	1,428		
Liberal	N. Davis	296		
Liberal	Bernard Boon	293		
Liberal	W. Spring	276		
Liberal	M. Jaeger-Carlsen	239		
Turnout				
Conservative hold		Swing		
Conservative hold		Swing		
Conservative hold		Swing		
Conservative hold		Swing		

=== Park ===
Park (3)
Party	Candidate	Votes	%	±%
Conservative	J. Smith	1,455		
Conservative	C. Annal	1,440		
Conservative	A. Toms	1,383		
Labour	S. Brooks	1291		
Labour	W. Burgess	1258		
Labour	A. Willson	1249		
Liberal	T. Needham	328		
Liberal	G. McDonough	297		
Liberal	P. Wright	288		
Communist	E. Woddis	99		
Turnout				
Conservative hold		Swing		
Conservative hold		Swing		
Conservative hold		Swing		

=== Seven Kings ===
Seven Kings (4)
Party	Candidate	Votes	%	±%

=== Snaresbrook ===
Snaresbrook (4)
Party	Candidate	Votes	%	±%

=== Wanstead ===
Wanstead (4)
Party	Candidate	Votes	%	±%

=== Woodford ===
Woodford (4)
Party	Candidate	Votes	%	±%
Conservative	Fred Mountier	3,413		
Conservative	N. Thurgood	3,406		
Conservative	H. Dedman	3,340		
Conservative	J. Billingham	3,301		
Labour	J. D. Haworth	764		
Labour	J. M. Haworth	735		
Labour	P. Pollard	735		
Labour	S. Madell	675		
Liberal	D. Blackett	472		
Liberal	B. Bray	457		
Liberal	L. Dilloway	375		
Independent	A. Land	214		
Turnout				
Conservative hold		Swing		
Conservative hold		Swing		
Conservative hold		Swing		
Conservative hold		Swing		

== By-elections ==
The following by-elections took place between the 1971 and 1974 elections:

- 1971 Snaresbrook by-election
- 1973 Hainault by-election
