= 1968 Redbridge London Borough Council election =

← 1964	9 May 1968	1971 →

All 60 Redbridge London Borough Council seats 31 seats needed for a majority

The 1968 Redbridge Council election took place on 9 May 1968 to elect members of Redbridge London Borough Council in London, England. The whole council was up for election and the Conservative party stayed in overall control of the council.

== Electoral arrangements ==
The election was originally scheduled for 1967, but the term of members due to go out in 1967 was extended for one year to prevent the London borough council elections taking place in the same year as the Greater London Council election. (Note: Borough councillor and alderman terms due to end in 1967 were extended by the London Government Act 1967.) The election used the seventeen wards from the previous election for a second time. Councillors were elected for three years with the next election scheduled for 1971.

Polling took place on 9 May 1968.

== Results ==
=== Aldermanic election ===
In addition to the 60 elected councillors, there were ten aldermen on the council. Five aldermen elected in 1964 continued to serve until 1971 and the other five retired before the 1968 election. Five aldermen were elected by the council in 1968 to serve until 1974.

== Ward results ==
=== Aldborough ===
Aldborough (3)
Party	Candidate	Votes	%	±%
Conservative	E. Harris	2,093		
Conservative	J. Savage	2,067		
Conservative	E. Watts	2,062		
Labour	H. Lewis	528		
Labour	J. Lethbridge	484		
Labour	R. Edey	481		
Turnout				
Conservative hold		Swing		
Conservative hold		Swing		
Conservative hold		Swing		

=== Barkingside ===
Barkingside (4)
Party	Candidate	Votes	%	±%
Conservative	V. Grose	2,719		
Conservative	H. Watts	2,699		
Conservative	T. Cobb	2,690		
Conservative	K. Webb	2,662		
Liberal	C. Shuman	430		
Liberal	E. Ives	404		
Liberal	C. Jakens	379		
Liberal	E. Thompson	373		
Labour	C. Dicker	371		
Labour	M. Drake	363		
Labour	N. Saponia	325		
Labour	J. Smithson	312		
Turnout				
Conservative hold		Swing		
Conservative hold		Swing		
Conservative hold		Swing		
Conservative hold		Swing		

=== Bridge ===
Bridge (4)
Party	Candidate	Votes	%	±%
Conservative	A. Escott	2,614		
Conservative	L. Bridgeman	2,592		
Conservative	R. Underwood	2,573		
Conservative	D. Stephens	2,492		
Liberal	S. Fraser	478		
Liberal	G. Grindley	441		
Liberal	M. Silverston	440		
Liberal	R. Scott	433		
Labour	C. Lamb	399		
Labour	R. Tomlinson	398		
Labour	A. Carter	386		
Labour	R. Andrews	327		
Communist	S. Brown	183		
Turnout				
Conservative hold		Swing		
Conservative hold		Swing		
Conservative hold		Swing		
Conservative hold		Swing		

=== Chadwell ===
Chadwell (4)
Party	Candidate	Votes	%	±%
Conservative	N. Hurst	2,658		
Conservative	A. Cross	2,608		
Conservative	R. Martin	2,573		
Conservative	A. Yates	2,548		
Labour	T. Dicker	553		
Labour	D. Wightman	519		
Labour	A. Hutson	518		
Labour	E. Pye	513		
Liberal	V. Mason	494		
Liberal	R. Ellis	493		
Liberal	M. Silvey	418		
Liberal	V. Shuman	413		
Turnout				
Conservative hold		Swing		
Conservative hold		Swing		
Conservative hold		Swing		
Conservative hold		Swing		

=== Clayhall ===
Clayhall (3)
Party	Candidate	Votes	%	±%
Conservative	C. Loveless	2,440		
Conservative	G. Chamberlin	2,423		
Conservative	J. Norwood	2,333		
Liberal	M. Lorek	348		
Liberal	B. Rance	320		
Labour	G. Phillips	284		
Labour	W. Burgess	266		
Labour	J. Stokes	257		
Turnout				
Conservative hold		Swing		
Conservative hold		Swing		
Conservative hold		Swing		

=== Clementswood ===
Clementswood (3)
Party	Candidate	Votes	%	±%
Conservative	J. Owen	1,788		
Conservative	D. Lowther	1,783		
Conservative	H. Jackson	1,747		
Labour	G. Watson	950		
Labour	E. Roberts	910		
Labour	D. Catling	843		
Liberal	W. Jarrold	454		
Liberal	T. Smith	431		
Liberal	B. Harrison	423		
Turnout				
Conservative gain from Labour		Swing		
Conservative gain from Labour		Swing		
Conservative gain from Labour		Swing		

=== Cranbrook ===
Cranbrook (4)
Party	Candidate	Votes	%	±%
Conservative	I. Natzler	3,104		
Conservative	B. Adams	3,038		
Conservative	M. Paige	3,022		
Conservative	D. Westley	2,962		
Liberal	R. Newland	882		
Liberal	A. Manwaring	816		
Liberal	G. Wilson	805		
Liberal	G. Stone	745		
Labour	A. Barr	393		
Labour	F. Land	380		
Labour	R. Chatten	369		
Labour	E. Prent	369		
Turnout				
Conservative hold		Swing		
Conservative hold		Swing		
Conservative hold		Swing		
Conservative hold		Swing		

=== Fairlop ===
Fairlop (3)
Party	Candidate	Votes	%	±%
Conservative	D. Elliott	2,207		
Conservative	A. Follows	2,173		
Conservative	K. Harvey	2,125		
Labour	L. Emons	892		
Labour	G. Jarman	817		
Labour	N. Young	802		
Liberal	G. Seabridge	316		
Liberal	D. Swindell	296		
Liberal	D. Bigg	292		
Turnout				
Conservative gain from Labour		Swing		
Conservative gain from Labour		Swing		
Conservative gain from Labour		Swing		

=== Goodmayes ===
Goodmayes (3)
Party	Candidate	Votes	%	±%
Labour	A. Carradice	1,189		
Labour	F. Watts	1,106		
Conservative	A. Dixon	1,091		
Labour	T. Reynolds	1068		
Conservative	G. Brindley	1017		
Conservative	J. Howes	968		
Liberal	C. Morrison	278		
Liberal	J. Stonham	251		
Liberal	A. Yates	242		
Communist	E. Radley	142		
Turnout				
Labour hold		Swing		
Labour hold		Swing		
Conservative gain from Labour		Swing		

=== Hainault ===
Hainault (3)
Party	Candidate	Votes	%	±%
Labour	K. Kelly	1,414		
Labour	George Davies	1,342		
Labour	A. Young	1,296		
Conservative	T. Ryan	1,087		
Conservative	P. Crighton	1,066		
Conservative	C. Annal	1,025		
Liberal	M. Dixon	461		
Liberal	F. Fuller	438		
Liberal	E. Flack	404		
Turnout				
Labour hold		Swing		
Labour hold		Swing		
Labour hold		Swing		

=== Ilford ===
Ilford (3)
Party	Candidate	Votes	%	±%
Conservative	M. Clark	1,289		
Conservative	L. Golding	1,230		
Conservative	K. Albert-Richards	1,133		
Labour	J. Ryder	749		
Labour	D. Bonsor	720		
Labour	M. Powers	681		
Liberal	H. Price	390		
Liberal	J. Newland	372		
Liberal	A. Train	357		
National Front	W. Partridge	229		
Communist	P. Devine	103		
Turnout				
Conservative gain from Labour		Swing		
Conservative gain from Labour		Swing		
Conservative gain from Labour		Swing		

=== Mayfield ===
Mayfield (4)
Party	Candidate	Votes	%	±%
Conservative	Bert Barker	2,860		
Conservative	Roland Hill	2,841		
Conservative	L. Hipkins	2,814		
Conservative	D. Latham	2,809		
Liberal	G. Bellamy	830		
Liberal	J. Vincent	734		
Liberal	M. Kennelly	704		
Liberal	Bernard Boon	703		
Labour	Charles Burgess	543		
Labour	A. Chatten	489		
Labour	J. Fergus	481		
Labour	H. Jewitt	478		
Turnout				
Conservative hold		Swing		
Conservative hold		Swing		
Conservative hold		Swing		
Conservative hold		Swing		

=== Park ===
Park (3)
Party	Candidate	Votes	%	±%
Conservative	J. Smith	2,066		
Conservative	B. Tovey	2,063		
Conservative	A. Toms	2,042		
Labour	R. Spack	605		
Labour	G. Gooding	602		
Liberal	G. McDonough	591		
Liberal	G. Wilson	591		
Labour	L. Carton	585		
Liberal	T. Needham	573		
Communist	E. Woddis	100		
Turnout				
Conservative hold		Swing		
Conservative hold		Swing		
Conservative hold		Swing		

=== Seven Kings ===
Seven Kings (4)
Party	Candidate	Votes	%	±%
Conservative	H. Aly	2,141		
Conservative	W. Glover	2,027		
Conservative	D. Odam	2,016		
Conservative	A. Leggatt	2,014		
Labour	H. Copsey	428		
Labour	T. Ridoutt	402		
Labour	N. Stringer	384		
Labour	B. Wallington	374		
Liberal	D. Ashcroft	340		
Liberal	S. Richards	327		
Liberal	A. Bigg	319		
Liberal	V. Mason	290		
Turnout				
Conservative hold		Swing		
Conservative hold		Swing		
Conservative hold		Swing		
Conservative hold		Swing		

=== Snaresbrook ===
Snaresbrook (4)
Party	Candidate	Votes	%	±%
Conservative	J. Telford	3,082		
Conservative	R. Smith	3,059		
Conservative	W. Roberts	3,058		
Conservative	R. Open	2,932		
Liberal	H. Couch	504		
Liberal	W. Collins	489		
Liberal	C. Grindley	447		
Liberal	P. Netherclift	416		
Labour	P. Turner	302		
Labour	R. Barclay	292		
Labour	J. Morris	288		
Labour	A. Womersley	269		
Turnout				
Conservative hold		Swing		
Conservative hold		Swing		
Conservative hold		Swing		
Conservative hold		Swing		

=== Wanstead ===
Wanstead (4)
Party	Candidate	Votes	%	±%
Conservative	J. Vane	2,963		
Conservative	B. Hamilton	2,844		
Conservative	V. Wilson	2,843		
Conservative	A. Reynolds	2,822		
Residents	J. Charter	2,439		
Residents	J. Duggan	2,278		
Residents	C. Blake	2,270		
Residents	W. Gibbons	2,233		
Labour	D. Runnicles	297		
Labour	A. Land	270		
Labour	J. Lewis	253		
Labour	J. Savill	234		
Communist	D. Haynes	136		
Turnout				
Conservative hold		Swing		
Conservative hold		Swing		
Conservative hold		Swing		
Conservative hold		Swing		

=== Woodford ===
Woodford (4)
Party	Candidate	Votes	%	±%
Conservative	H. Dedman	4,282		
Conservative	J. Billingham	4,255		
Conservative	N. Thurgood	4,212		
Conservative	Fred Mountier	4,198		
Liberal	M. Hoskins	676		
Liberal	L. Dilloway	612		
Liberal	D. Blackett	572		
Liberal	D. Payne	539		
Labour	J. Mallinson	314		
Labour	M. Stark	277		
Labour	P. Pollard	276		
Labour	H. Duffree	266		
Turnout				
Conservative hold		Swing		
Conservative hold		Swing		
Conservative hold		Swing		
Conservative hold		Swing		

== By-elections ==
The following by-elections took place between the 1968 and 1971 elections:

- 1969 Park (Redbridge) by-election
- 1970 Goodmayes by-election
