= Hainault (ward) =

Electoral ward in the London Borough of Redbridge

- Electoral ward for the Redbridge London Borough Council
- Hainault ward boundaries since 2018
- Borough: Redbridge
- County: Greater London
- Population: 15,702 (2021)
- Electorate: 10,571 (2022)
- Major settlements: Hainault
- Area: 5.643 square kilometres (2.179 sq mi)

Current electoral ward
- Created: 1965
- Number of members: 3
- Councillors: Shah Ali; Helen Mullis; Neil Anderson
- ONS code: 00BCGK (2002–2018)
- GSS code: E05000506 (2002–2018); E05011245 (2018–present)

Hainault is an electoral ward in the London Borough of Redbridge. The ward has existed since the creation of the borough on 1 April 1965 and was first used in the 1964 elections. It returns three councillors to Redbridge London Borough Council. The ward was subject to boundary revisions in 1978, 2002 and 2018.

== List of councillors ==
| Term | Councillor | Party |
|---|---|---|
| 1964–1973; 1978–1984 | George Davies | Labour |
| 1964–1968 | Sydney Gleed | Labour |
| 1964–1968 | D. Smith | Labour |
| 1968–1971 | K. Kelly | Labour |
| 1968–1971 | A. Young | Labour |
| 1971–1981 | Glen Jarman | Labour |
| 1971–1978 | J. Ryder | Labour |
| 1973–1978 | W. Finesilver | Labour |
| 1978–1982 | Timothy Ridoutt | Labour |
| 1981–1994 | Alan Hughes | Labour |
| 1982–1986 | Raymond Clark | Labour |
| 1984–1989 | David Jones | Labour |
| 1986–1994 | Peter McEwen | Labour |
| 1989–1997 | Linda Perham | Labour |
| 1994–2002 | John Fairley-Churchill | Labour |
| 1994–2002 | Edmund Peake | Labour |
| 1997–2006 | Richard Newcombe | Labour |
| 2002–2014 | Ted Griffin (Note: Ted Griffin changed parties in 2014) | Conservative |
| 2002–2014 | Ted Griffin | UKIP |
| 2002–2006 | Arthur Leggatt | Conservative |
| 2006–2010 | Julian Leppert | BNP |
| 2006–2010 | Brian Waite | Conservative |
| 2010–2014 | Thomas Gray | Conservative |
| 2010–2014 | David Poole | Conservative |
| 2014–2022 | Roy Emmett | Labour |
| 2014–2022 | Mark Santos | Labour |
| 2014–2022 | Joe Hehir | Labour |
| 2022–2025 | Sam Gould | Labour |
| 2022–present | Shah Ali | Labour |
| 2022–2026 | Luthfa Rahman | Labour |
| 2025–present | Helen Mullis | Labour |
| 2026–present | Neil Anderson | Reform |

== Summary ==
Councillors elected by party at each general borough election.

- Labour
- Conservative
- BNP
- Reform

== Redbridge council elections since 2018 ==
There was a revision of ward boundaries in Redbridge in 2018.

=== 2026 election ===
The election took place on 7 May 2026.

2026 Redbridge London Borough Council election: Hainault
| Party | Candidate | Votes | % | ±% |
|---|---|---|---|---|
| Labour | Helen Mullis | 1,573 | 37.1 | −13.6 |
| Labour | Shah Ali | 1,523 | 35.9 | −11.0 |
| Reform | Neil Anderson | 1,378 | 32.5 | N/A |
| Labour | Pushpita Gupta | 1,368 | 32.3 | −13.0 |
| Reform | Sylvester Lewis | 1,311 | 30.9 | N/A |
| Reform | Sunil Bali | 1,234 | 29.1 | N/A |
| Green | Cat Still | 846 | 20.0 | N/A |
| Redbridge Ind. | Rana Ahmad | 613 | 14.5 | N/A |
| Conservative | Kamaldeep Singh | 516 | 12.2 | −31.2 |
| Conservative | Pamkaj Baldev | 492 | 11.6 | −31.2 |
| Conservative | Prabhu Vasudevan | 487 | 11.5 | −30.1 |
| Liberal Democrats | Piotr Berndt | 261 | 6.2 | N/A |
| Turnout | | 4239 | 38.93 | +6.03 |
| Labour hold | | Swing | | |
| Labour hold | | Swing | | |
| Reform gain from Labour | | Swing | | |

=== 2025 by-election ===
The by-election took place on 1 May 2025, following the resignation of Sam Gould.

2025 Hainault by-election
| Party | Candidate | Votes | % | ±% |
|---|---|---|---|---|
| Labour | Helen Mullis | 835 | 28.8 | |
| Independent | Glen Haywood | 834 | 28.8 | |
| Reform | Raj Forhad | 611 | 21.1 | |
| Conservative | Teresa Blohm | 421 | 14.5 | |
| Green | Nirojan Raveendralingam | 125 | 4.3 | |
| Liberal Democrats | Cathy Davies | 73 | 2.5 | |
| Turnout | | | | |
| Labour hold | | | | |

=== 2022 election ===
The election took place on 5 May 2022.

2022 Redbridge London Borough Council election: Hainault
| Party | Candidate | Votes | % | ±% |
|---|---|---|---|---|
| Labour | Sam Gould | 1,764 | 50.7 | ▲0.6 |
| Labour | Shah Ali | 1,633 | 46.9 | ▼7.9 |
| Labour | Luthfa Rahman | 1,578 | 45.3 | ▼6.9 |
| Conservative | Donna Baker | 1,510 | 43.4 | ▼2.4 |
| Conservative | Glen Haywood | 1,490 | 42.8 | ▲2.2 |
| Conservative | Caroline Porter | 1,448 | 41.6 | ▲1.5 |
| Ind. Network | Sam Ali | 243 | 7.0 | New |
| Turnout | | 3,480 | 32.9 | ▼2.5 |
| Labour hold | | | | |
| Labour hold | | | | |
| Labour hold | | | | |

=== 2018 election ===
The election took place on 3 May 2018.

2018 Redbridge London Borough Council election: Hainault
| Party | Candidate | Votes | % | ±% |
|---|---|---|---|---|
| Labour | Roy Emmett | 1,905 | 54.76 | N/A |
| Labour | Mark Santos | 1,815 | 52.17 | N/A |
| Labour | Joe Hehir | 1,744 | 50.13 | N/A |
| Conservative | Sam Chapman | 1,593 | 45.79 | N/A |
| Conservative | John Kissane | 1,412 | 40.59 | N/A |
| Conservative | James Pepe | 1,394 | 40.07 | N/A |
| Turnout | | 3,479 | 35.38 | |
| Labour win (new boundaries) | | | | |
| Labour win (new boundaries) | | | | |
| Labour win (new boundaries) | | | | |

== 2002–2018 Redbridge council elections ==
Hainault ward boundaries from 2002 to 2018

There was a revision of ward boundaries in Redbridge in 2002.

=== 2014 election ===
The election took place on 22 May 2014.

2014 Redbridge London Borough Council election: Hainault
| Party | Candidate | Votes | % | ±% |
|---|---|---|---|---|
| Labour | Roy Emmett | 1,227 | | |
| Labour | Mark Santos | 1,143 | | |
| Labour | Joe Hehir | 1,035 | | |
| Conservative | David Poole | 984 | | |
| UKIP | Ted Griffin | 900 | | |
| Conservative | Melvyn Marks | 895 | | |
| UKIP | Mark Aaron | 894 | | |
| Conservative | Melinda Ponsonby | 873 | | |
| UKIP | Kenny Thomas | 818 | | |
| British Democratic | Julian Leppert | 284 | | |
| Liberal Democrats | Ali Hifzur | 156 | | |
| Turnout | | | | |
| Labour gain from Conservative | | Swing | | |
| Labour gain from Conservative | | Swing | | |
| Labour gain from Conservative | | Swing | | |

=== 2010 election ===
The election on 6 May 2010 took place on the same day as the United Kingdom general election.

2010 Redbridge London Borough Council election: Hainault
| Party | Candidate | Votes | % | ±% |
|---|---|---|---|---|
| Conservative | Thomas Gray | 2,006 | | |
| Conservative | Ted Griffin | 1,835 | | |
| Conservative | David Poole | 1,747 | | |
| Labour | Roy Emmett | 1,684 | | |
| Labour | Mark Santos | 1,533 | | |
| Labour | Valerie Sproit | 1,444 | | |
| BNP | Russell Matthews | 910 | | |
| BNP | Julian Leppert | 894 | | |
| BNP | Victoria Moore | 748 | | |
| Liberal Democrats | Malcolm Swallow | 549 | | |
| Liberal Democrats | Valerie Taylor | 543 | | |
| Liberal Democrats | Deanna Seeff | 530 | | |
| UKIP | Brian Waite | 340 | | |
| UKIP | Alan Hughes | 267 | | |
| Turnout | | | 58.1 | +19.8 |
| Conservative gain from BNP | | Swing | | |
| Conservative hold | | Swing | | |
| Conservative hold | | Swing | | |

=== 2006 election ===
The election took place on 4 May 2006.

2006 Redbridge London Borough Council election: Hainault
| Party | Candidate | Votes | % | ±% |
|---|---|---|---|---|
| BNP | Julian Leppert | 1,150 | 31.8 | |
| Conservative | Brian Waite | 1,144 | 31.6 | |
| Conservative | Ted Griffin | 1,127 | | |
| Conservative | Arthur Leggatt | 1,066 | | |
| Labour | Richard Newcombe | 855 | 23.7 | |
| Labour | Lawrence Leaf | 837 | | |
| Labour | Mark Santos | 828 | | |
| Liberal Democrats | Allan Yeoman | 466 | 12.9 | |
| Liberal Democrats | Kathleen Black | 428 | | |
| Liberal Democrats | Patricia Ilett | 358 | | |
| Turnout | | | 38.3 | |
| BNP gain from Labour | | Swing | | |
| Conservative hold | | Swing | | |
| Conservative hold | | Swing | | |

=== 2002 election ===
The election took place on 2 May 2002.

2002 Redbridge London Borough Council election: Hainault
| Party | Candidate | Votes | % | ±% |
|---|---|---|---|---|
| Conservative | Ted Griffin | 1,035 | 13.9 | |
| Conservative | Arthur Leggatt | 984 | 13.3 | |
| Labour | Richard Newcombe | 844 | 11.1 | |
| Conservative | John Steinberg | 820 | 11.0 | |
| Labour | Royston Emmett | 817 | 11.0 | |
| Labour | Lesley Hilton | 771 | 10.4 | |
| BNP | Jason Douglas | 675 | 9.1 | |
| Liberal Democrats | Kathleen Black | 562 | 7.6 | |
| Liberal Democrats | Patricia Ilett | 456 | 6.1 | |
| Liberal Democrats | Ralph Stevens | 429 | 5.8 | |
| Total votes | | 8,817 | 100 | |
| Turnout | | | 35.6 | |
| Conservative win (new boundaries) | | | | |
| Conservative win (new boundaries) | | | | |
| Labour win (new boundaries) | | | | |

== 1978–2002 Redbridge council elections ==
Hainault ward boundaries from 1978 to 2002

There was a revision of ward boundaries in Redbridge in 1978.

=== 1998 election ===
The election took place on 7 May 1998.

1998 Redbridge London Borough Council election: Hainault
| Party | Candidate | Votes | % | ±% |
|---|---|---|---|---|
| Labour | John Fairley-Churchill | 1,070 | 59.62 | ▲2.20 |
| Labour | Richard Newcombe | 1,056 | | |
| Labour | Edmund Peake | 1,039 | | |
| Conservative | Sheila Moth | 530 | 29.33 | ▲1.24 |
| Conservative | Sonia Macdonald | 525 | | |
| Conservative | Barbara Wilson | 502 | | |
| Liberal Democrats | Kathleen Black | 221 | 11.06 | ▼3.42 |
| Liberal Democrats | Robert Wright | 192 | | |
| Liberal Democrats | Peter Prager | 174 | | |
| Registered electors | | 7,003 | | ▼12 |
| Turnout | | 1,892 | 27.02 | ▼18.64 |
| Rejected ballots | | 8 | 0.42 | ▲0.30 |
| Labour hold | | | | |
| Labour hold | | | | |
| Labour hold | | | | |

=== 1997 by-election ===
The by-election took place on 26 June 1997, following the resignation of Linda Perham.

1997 Hainault by-election
| Party | Candidate | Votes | % | ±% |
|---|---|---|---|---|
| Labour | Richard Newcombe | 1,054 | 64.5 | +7.5 |
| Conservative | Lee Scott | 513 | 31.4 | +3.6 |
| Liberal Democrats | Kathleen Black | 67 | 4.1 | −11.1 |
| Majority | | 541 | 33.1 | |
| Turnout | | 1,634 | 23.4 | |
| Labour hold | | Swing | | |

=== 1994 election ===
The election took place on 5 May 1994.

1994 Redbridge London Borough Council election: Hainault
| Party | Candidate | Votes | % | ±% |
|---|---|---|---|---|
| Labour | Linda Perham | 1,755 | 57.42 | ▲6.02 |
| Labour | John Fairley-Churchill | 1,721 | | |
| Labour | Edmund Peake | 1,676 | | |
| Conservative | Winifred Axon | 856 | 28.09 | ▼1.78 |
| Conservative | James Howes | 838 | | |
| Conservative | Barbara Wilson | 827 | | |
| Liberal Democrats | Kathleen Black | 468 | 14.48 | ▲5.41 |
| Liberal Democrats | Robert Wright | 434 | | |
| Liberal Democrats | Peter Prager | 398 | | |
| Registered electors | | 7,015 | | ▼249 |
| Turnout | | 3,203 | 45.66 | ▼2.48 |
| Rejected ballots | | 4 | 0.12 | ▲0.09 |
| Labour hold | | | | |
| Labour hold | | | | |
| Labour hold | | | | |

=== 1990 election ===
The election took place on 3 May 1990.

1990 Redbridge London Borough Council election: Hainault
| Party | Candidate | Votes | % | ±% |
|---|---|---|---|---|
| Labour | Alan Hughes | 1,893 | 51.40 | |
| Labour | Linda Perham | 1,800 | | |
| Labour | Peter McEwen | 1,779 | | |
| Conservative | Douglas Capmbell | 1,062 | 29.87 | |
| Conservative | Terry Montague | 1,062 | | |
| Conservative | Michael Borrott | 1,056 | | |
| Green | Emma Fletcher | 343 | 9.66 | |
| Liberal Democrats | Leslie Everest | 322 | 9.07 | |
| Registered electors | | 7,264 | | |
| Turnout | | 3,497 | 48.14 | |
| Rejected ballots | | 1 | 0.03 | |
| Labour hold | | Swing | | |
| Labour hold | | Swing | | |
| Labour hold | | Swing | | |

=== 1989 by-election ===
The by-election took place on 4 May 1989, following the resignation of David Jones.

1989 Hainault by-election
| Party | Candidate | Votes | % | ±% |
|---|---|---|---|---|
| Labour | Linda Perham | 1,742 | | |
| Conservative | Reginald Woda | 970 | | |
| Liberal Democrats | Valerie Ball | 228 | | |
| Turnout | | | | |
| Labour hold | | Swing | | |

=== 1986 election ===
The election took place on 8 May 1986.

1986 Redbridge London Borough Council election: Hainault
| Party | Candidate | Votes | % | ±% |
|---|---|---|---|---|
| Labour | Alan Hughes | 1,779 | | |
| Labour | David Jones | 1,758 | | |
| Labour | Peter McEwen | 1,672 | | |
| Conservative | Bernice Benton | 805 | | |
| Conservative | Christine Knight | 764 | | |
| Conservative | Ali Qureshi | 600 | | |
| Alliance | Peter Briggs | 463 | | |
| Alliance | Margaret Clarke | 444 | | |
| Alliance | Laurence Porter | 397 | | |
| Turnout | | | | |
| Labour hold | | Swing | | |
| Labour hold | | Swing | | |
| Labour hold | | Swing | | |

=== 1984 by-election ===
The by-election took place on 22 November 1984, following the death of George Davies.

1984 Hainault by-election
| Party | Candidate | Votes | % | ±% |
|---|---|---|---|---|
| Labour | David Jones | 1,290 | | |
| Conservative | Philip Duly | 487 | | |
| Alliance | Ernest Quilter | 458 | | |
| Turnout | | | | |
| Labour hold | | Swing | | |

=== 1982 election ===
The election took place on 6 May 1982.

1982 Redbridge London Borough Council election: Hainault
| Party | Candidate | Votes | % | ±% |
|---|---|---|---|---|
| Labour | George Davies | 1,438 | | |
| Labour | Alan Hughes | 1,420 | | |
| Labour | Raymond Clark | 1,406 | | |
| Conservative | David Edmonds | 1,063 | | |
| Conservative | Douglas Herbert | 1,050 | | |
| Conservative | Sydney Stevens | 1,038 | | |
| Alliance | Ernest Quilter | 487 | | |
| Alliance | Lily Smith | 472 | | |
| Alliance | Peter Briggs | | | |
| Turnout | | | | |
| Labour hold | | Swing | | |
| Labour hold | | Swing | | |
| Labour hold | | Swing | | |

=== 1981 by-election ===
The by-election took place on 12 May 1981, following the resignation of Glen Jarman.

1981 Hainault by-election
| Party | Candidate | Votes | % | ±% |
|---|---|---|---|---|
| Labour | Alan Hughes | 2,411 | | |
| Conservative | John Sharman | 546 | | |
| Liberal | Victor Christensen | 379 | | |
| Turnout | | | | |
| Labour hold | | Swing | | |

=== 1978 election ===
The election took place on 4 May 1978.

1978 Redbridge London Borough Council election: Hainault
| Party | Candidate | Votes | % | ±% |
|---|---|---|---|---|
| Labour | Timothy Ridoutt | 1,882 | | |
| Labour | George Davies | 1,823 | | |
| Labour | Glen Jarman | 1,814 | | |
| Conservative | Sydney Stevens | 1,116 | | |
| Conservative | Douglas Herbert | 1,080 | | |
| Conservative | Trevor Thomas | 1,068 | | |
| National Front | John Hughes | 199 | | |
| National Front | Gilbert Jennings | 179 | | |
| Liberal | John Delves | 159 | | |
| National Front | Frederick King | 146 | | |
| Liberal | Stuart McDougall | 98 | | |
| Communist | James Burns | 78 | | |
| Turnout | | | | |
| Labour win (new boundaries) | | | | |
| Labour win (new boundaries) | | | | |
| Labour win (new boundaries) | | | | |

== 1964–1978 Redbridge council elections ==
External image
- Map showing Hainault ward boundaries from 1965 to 1978

=== 1974 election ===
The election took place on 2 May 1974.

1974 Redbridge London Borough Council election: Hainault
| Party | Candidate | Votes | % | ±% |
|---|---|---|---|---|
| Labour | W. Finesilver | 2,133 | | |
| Labour | J. Ryder | 2,078 | | |
| Labour | Glen Jarman | 2,061 | | |
| Conservative | S. De Winter | 669 | | |
| Conservative | U. Roberts | 650 | | |
| Conservative | Arthur Leggatt | 645 | | |
| Liberal | E. Flack | 439 | | |
| Liberal | J. Freeman | 427 | | |
| Liberal | D. Lawrence | 399 | | |
| Turnout | | | | |
| Labour hold | | Swing | | |
| Labour hold | | Swing | | |
| Labour hold | | Swing | | |

=== 1973 by-election ===
The by-election took place on 1 November 1973.

1973 Hainault by-election
| Party | Candidate | Votes | % | ±% |
|---|---|---|---|---|
| Labour | W. Finesilver | 1,939 | | |
| Liberal | E. Flack | 813 | | |
| Conservative | J. Lovell | 523 | | |
| Turnout | | | 31.0% | |
| Labour hold | | Swing | | |

=== 1971 election ===
The election took place on 13 May 1971.

1971 Redbridge London Borough Council election: Hainault
| Party | Candidate | Votes | % | ±% |
|---|---|---|---|---|
| Labour | George Davies | 3,296 | | |
| Labour | Glen Jarman | 3,251 | | |
| Labour | J. Ryder | 3,173 | | |
| Conservative | J. Sweeney | 722 | | |
| Conservative | S. Rose | 710 | | |
| Conservative | R. Westrip | 680 | | |
| Liberal | E. Flack | 273 | | |
| Liberal | D. Lawrence | 172 | | |
| Liberal | S. Wicks | 157 | | |
| Communist | T. Ling | 75 | | |
| Turnout | | | | |
| Labour hold | | Swing | | |
| Labour hold | | Swing | | |
| Labour hold | | Swing | | |

=== 1968 election ===
The election took place on 9 May 1968.

1968 Redbridge London Borough Council election: Hainault
| Party | Candidate | Votes | % | ±% |
|---|---|---|---|---|
| Labour | K. Kelly | 1,414 | | |
| Labour | George Davies | 1,342 | | |
| Labour | A. Young | 1,296 | | |
| Conservative | T. Ryan | 1,087 | | |
| Conservative | P. Crighton | 1,066 | | |
| Conservative | C. Annal | 1,025 | | |
| Liberal | M. Dixon | 461 | | |
| Liberal | F. Fuller | 438 | | |
| Liberal | E. Flack | 404 | | |
| Turnout | | | | |
| Labour hold | | Swing | | |
| Labour hold | | Swing | | |
| Labour hold | | Swing | | |

=== 1964 election ===
The election took place on 7 May 1964.

1964 Redbridge London Borough Council election: Hainault
| Party | Candidate | Votes | % | ±% |
|---|---|---|---|---|
| Labour | George Davies | 2,685 | | |
| Labour | Sydney Gleed | 2,668 | | |
| Labour | D. Smith | 2,604 | | |
| Conservative | E. Low | 453 | | |
| Conservative | J. Murphy | 446 | | |
| Conservative | A. Ashton | 422 | | |
| Liberal | P. Palmer | 310 | | |
| Liberal | R. Scott | 292 | | |
| Liberal | A. Yeoman | 282 | | |
| Communist | P. Devine | 161 | | |
| Turnout | | | | |
| Labour win (new seat) | | | | |
| Labour win (new seat) | | | | |
| Labour win (new seat) | | | | |
