= Aldborough (ward) =

London Borough of Redbridge electoral ward

- Electoral ward for the Redbridge London Borough Council
- Aldborough ward boundaries since 2018
- Borough: Redbridge
- County: Greater London
- Population: 15,462 (2021)
- Electorate: 10,251 (2022)
- Major settlements: Aldborough Hatch
- Area: 8.474 square kilometres (3.272 sq mi)

Current electoral ward
- Created: 1965
- Number of members: 3
- Councillors: John Howard; Jyotsna Islam; Lebo Phakoe
- GSS code: E05000495 (2002–2018); E05011234 (2018–present)

Aldborough is an electoral ward in the London Borough of Redbridge. The ward has existed since the creation of the borough on 1 April 1965 and was first used in the 1964 elections. It returns three councillors to Redbridge London Borough Council.

== Redbridge council elections since 2018 ==
There was a revision of ward boundaries in Redbridge in 2018.

=== 2022 election ===
The election took place on 5 May 2022.

2022 Redbridge London Borough Council election: Aldborough
Party	Candidate	Votes	%	±%
Labour	John Howard	2,038	58.0	▼5.1
Labour	Jyotsna Islam	1,817	51.8	▼8.8
Labour	Lebo Phakoe	1,664	47.4	▼6.6
Conservative	Richard Firmstone	1,307	37.2	▲8.4
Conservative	Ajit Saha	1,229	35.0	▲6.5
Conservative	Md Hossain	1,175	33.5	▲8.6
Ind. Network	Daniel Adam	293	8.3	New
Liberal Democrats	Michael Teahan	262	7.5	New
Turnout		3,511	34.3	▼5.0
Labour hold		Swing		
Labour hold		Swing		
Labour hold		Swing		

=== 2018 election ===
The election took place on 3 May 2018.

2018 Redbridge London Borough Council election: Aldborough
Party	Candidate	Votes	%	±%
Labour	John Howard	2,505	63.08	N/A
Labour	Debbie Kaur-Thiara	2,408	60.64	N/A
Labour	Jyotsna Islam	2,146	54.04	N/A
Conservative	Alicja Borkowska	1,145	28.83	N/A
Conservative	Kash Akram	1,130	28.46	N/A
Conservative	Gary Sukhija	990	24.93	N/A
Redbridge Trade Union Party	Andy Walker	623	15.69	N/A
Turnout		3,971	39.29	
Labour win (new boundaries)				
Labour win (new boundaries)				
Labour win (new boundaries)				

== 2002–2018 Redbridge council elections ==
Aldborough ward boundaries from 2002 to 2018

There was a revision of ward boundaries in Redbridge in 2002.

=== 2014 election ===
The election took place on 22 May 2014.

2014 Redbridge London Borough Council election: Aldborough
Party	Candidate	Votes	%	±%
Labour	Debbie Kaur-Thiara	2,434		
Labour	John Howard	2,364		
Labour	Wes Streeting	2,100		
Conservative	Vanessa Cole	1,919		
Conservative	Ruth Clark	1,903		
Conservative	Thane Thaneswaran	1,526		
Independent	Andy Walker	1,092		
Liberal Democrats	Richard Mathias	211		
Turnout				
Labour hold		Swing		
Labour gain from Conservative		Swing		
Labour gain from Conservative		Swing		

=== 2011 by-election ===
The by-election was held on 11 November 2011, following the resignation of Mike Figg.

2011 Aldborough by-election
Party	Candidate	Votes	%	±%
Labour	Debbie Thiara	1,436		
Conservative	Melvyn Marks	1,071		
Liberal Democrats	Christopher Greaves	87		
UKIP	Paul Wiffen	83		
Green	Clive Durdle	64		
BNP	Danny Warville	34	1.2	
Majority		365		
Turnout		2,780	24.69	
Labour hold		Swing		

=== 2010 election ===
The election on 6 May 2010 took place on the same day as the United Kingdom general election.

2010 Redbridge London Borough Council election: Aldborough
Party	Candidate	Votes	%	±%
Conservative	Vanessa Cole	2,806		
Conservative	Ruth Clark	2,706		
Labour	Mike Figg	2,663		
Labour	Mark Epstein	2,602		
Conservative	Loraine Sladden	2,497		
Labour	Debbie Thiara	2,432		
Liberal Democrats	Catherine Davies	979		
Liberal Democrats	Christopher Greaves	840		
Liberal Democrats	Susan Mann	786		
Turnout			63.8	+24.3
Conservative hold		Swing		
Conservative hold		Swing		
Labour gain from Conservative		Swing		

=== 2006 election ===
The election took place on 4 May 2006.

2006 Redbridge London Borough Council election: Aldborough
Party	Candidate	Votes	%	±%
Conservative	Vanessa Cole	1,877	46.6	
Conservative	Ruth Clark	1,804		
Conservative	Loraine Sladden	1,683		
Labour	John Coombes	1,391	34.6	
Labour	Hedda Harris	1,150		
Labour	Mark Epstein	1,118		
Liberal Democrats	Leslie Everest	424	10.5	
Liberal Democrats	Leonard Filtness	406		
Green	Susanne Marshall	334	8.3	
Liberal Democrats	Monique Seeff	295		
Turnout			39.5	
Conservative hold		Swing		
Conservative gain from Labour		Swing		
Conservative hold		Swing		

=== 2002 election ===
The election took place on 2 May 2002.

2002 Redbridge London Borough Council election: Aldborough
Party	Candidate	Votes	%	±%
Conservative	Vanessa Cole	1,516	18.0	
Labour	John Coombes	1,385	16.4	
Conservative	Loraine Sladden	1,354	16.1	
Conservative	Rajinder Athwal	1,329	15.8	
Labour	Linda Guerin	1,218	14.5	
Labour	Balvinder Saund	1,073	12.7	
Liberal Democrats	Susan Mann	323	3.8	
Liberal Democrats	Geraldine McElarney	259	3.0	
Green	Therese Reggio	245	2.9	
Liberal Democrats	Anne Peterson	233	2.7	
Total votes		8,395	100	
Turnout			37.0	
Conservative win (new boundaries)				
Labour win (new boundaries)				
Conservative win (new boundaries)				

== 1978–2002 Redbridge council elections ==
There was a revision of ward boundaries in Redbridge in 1978.

=== 1998 by-election ===
The by-election took place on 1 October 1998, following the resignation of Desmond Thurlby.

1998 Aldborough by-election
Party	Candidate	Votes	%	±%
Conservative	Vanessa Cole	1,013	48.7	+12.7
Labour	Gary Scottow	942	45.3	−11.1
Liberal Democrats	Catherine Davies	125	6.0	−1.6
Majority		71	3.4	
Turnout		2,080	30.8	
Conservative gain from Labour		Swing		

=== 1998 election ===
The election took place on 7 May 1998.

1998 Redbridge London Borough Council election: Aldborough
Party	Candidate	Votes	%	±%
Labour	John Coombes	1,453	55.48	▲8.95
Labour	Desmon Thuriby	1,346		
Labour	Kenneth Turner	1,285		
Conservative	Vanessa Cole	927	37.24	▼4.39
Conservative	William McIntyre	914		
Conservative	Faith Watts	900		
Liberal Democrats	John Barmby	196	7.28	▼4.56
Liberal Democrats	Michael Dommett	170		
Liberal Democrats	Elizabeth Yeoman	170		
Registered electors		6,720		▲79
Turnout		2,652	39.46	▼12.88
Rejected ballots		12	0.45	▲0.36
Labour hold				
Labour hold				
Labour hold				

=== 1994 by-election ===
The by-election took place on 1 December 1994, following the resignation of Raymond Ward.

1994 Aldborough by-election
Party	Candidate	Votes	%	±%
Labour	John Coombes	1,155		
Conservative	Graham Borrett	1,078		
Liberal Democrats	John Tyne	255		
Turnout				
Labour hold		Swing		

=== 1994 election ===
The election took place on 5 May 1994.

1994 Redbridge London Borough Council election: Aldborough
Party	Candidate	Votes	%	±%
Labour	Desmond Thurlby	1,536	46.53	▲10.64
Labour	Kenneth Turner	1,518		
Labour	Raymond Ward	1,424		
Conservative	Graham Borrott	1,378	41.63	▼2.10
Conservative	David Jones	1,326		
Conservative	Ernest Watts	1,304		
Liberal Democrats	John Tyne	389	11.84	▲3.00
Liberal Democrats	Walter Straight	388		
Liberal Democrats	Naren Dattani	364		
Registered electors		6,641		▼2,004
Turnout		3,476	52.34	▲3.28
Rejected ballots		3	0.09	▲0.07
Labour gain from Conservative				
Labour gain from Conservative				
Labour gain from Conservative				

=== 1990 election ===
The election took place on 3 May 1990.

1990 Redbridge London Borough Council election: Aldborough
Party	Candidate	Votes	%	±%
Conservative	Graham Borrott	2,038	43.73	
Conservative	David Jones	1,933		
Conservative	Ernest Watts	1,887		
Labour	Lesley Hilton	1,691	35.89	
Labour	Rosemary Keery	1,658		
Labour	Mohammad Kahn	1,461		
Green	Timothy Marshall	515	11.53	
Liberal Democrats	Veronica Roach	395	8.84	
Registered electors		8,645		
Turnout		4,241	49.06	
Rejected ballots		1	0.02	
Conservative hold		Swing		
Conservative hold		Swing		
Conservative hold		Swing		

=== 1986 election ===
The election took place on 8 May 1986.

1986 Redbridge London Borough Council election: Aldborough
Party	Candidate	Votes	%	±%
Conservative	Ernest Watts	1,703		
Conservative	John Lovell	1,700		
Conservative	Graham Borrott	1,694		
Labour	John Coombes	1,400		
Labour	Robert Costley	1,277		
Labour	Charles Ellett	1,235		
Alliance	Thomas Kitchener	510		
Alliance	Avrom Pearl	476		
Alliance	Alastair Wilson	468		
Turnout				
Conservative hold		Swing		
Conservative hold		Swing		
Conservative hold		Swing		

=== 1982 election ===
The election took place on 6 May 1982.

1982 Redbridge London Borough Council election: Aldborough
Party	Candidate	Votes	%	±%
Conservative	John Lovell	2,077		
Conservative	Graham Borrett	2,041		
Conservative	Ernest Watts	2,036		
Labour	John Coombes	1,018		
Labour	Brenda Lee	973		
Labour	David Whittaker	953		
Alliance	Alastair Wilson	621		
Alliance	Thomas Kitchener	615		
Alliance	Lesley Wilson	567		
Turnout				
Conservative hold		Swing		
Conservative hold		Swing		
Conservative hold		Swing		

=== 1978 election ===
The election took place on 4 May 1978.

1978 Redbridge London Borough Council election: Aldborough
Party	Candidate	Votes	%	±%
Conservative	John Lovell	2,039		
Conservative	Graham Borrott	2,024		
Conservative	Ernest Watts	2,010		
Labour	Walter Finesilver	1,350		
Labour	Alan Hughes	1,329		
Labour	John Ryder	1,251		
Liberal	Andrew Barnett	203		
Liberal	Philip Ximenez	155		
Turnout				
Conservative win (new boundaries)				
Conservative win (new boundaries)				
Conservative win (new boundaries)				

== 1964–1978 Redbridge council elections ==
=== 1974 election ===
The election took place on 2 May 1974.

1974 Redbridge London Borough Council election: Aldborough
Party	Candidate	Votes	%	±%
Conservative	Graham Borrott	1,815		
Conservative	Ernest Watts	1,804		
Conservative	John Lovell	1,796		
Labour	W. Axon	1,390		
Labour	R. Belkin	1,372		
Labour	H. Lewis	1,348		
Liberal	J. Davis	488		
Liberal	M. Davies	484		
Liberal	B. Freeman	451		
Turnout				
Conservative gain from Labour		Swing		
Conservative hold		Swing		
Conservative hold		Swing		

=== 1971 election ===
The election took place on 13 May 1971.

1971 Redbridge London Borough Council election: Aldborough
Party	Candidate	Votes	%	±%
Labour	J. Smith	1,519		
Conservative	R. Chapman	1,496		
Conservative	Ernest Watts	1,481		
Labour	M. Roderick	1471		
Conservative	J. Savage	1460		
Labour	K. Axon	1416		
Liberal	J. Hewitt	172		
Liberal	R. Price	172		
Liberal	V. Shuman	158		
Independent	C. Giles	152		
Turnout				
Labour gain from Conservative		Swing		
Conservative hold		Swing		
Conservative hold		Swing		

=== 1968 election ===
The election took place on 9 May 1968.

1968 Redbridge London Borough Council election: Aldborough
Party	Candidate	Votes	%	±%
Conservative	E. Harris	2,093		
Conservative	J. Savage	2,067		
Conservative	Ernest Watts	2,062		
Labour	H. Lewis	528		
Labour	J. Lethbridge	484		
Labour	R. Edey	481		
Turnout				
Conservative hold		Swing		
Conservative hold		Swing		
Conservative hold		Swing		

=== 1964 election ===
The election took place on 7 May 1964.

1964 Redbridge London Borough Council election: Aldborough
Party	Candidate	Votes	%	±%
Conservative	E. Harris	1,561		
Conservative	S. Loveless	1,533		
Conservative	C. Watson	1,529		
Labour	A. McKelvey	948		
Labour	E. Pye	877		
Labour	R. Westerbury	834		
Liberal	J. Carter	479		
Liberal	J. Hitchen	472		
Liberal	S. Hellak	465		
Turnout		2,986	30.7	
Conservative win (new seat)				
Conservative win (new seat)				
Conservative win (new seat)				
