= Alex Wilson (British politician) =

British politician and businessman (born 1984)

Alex Wilson AM
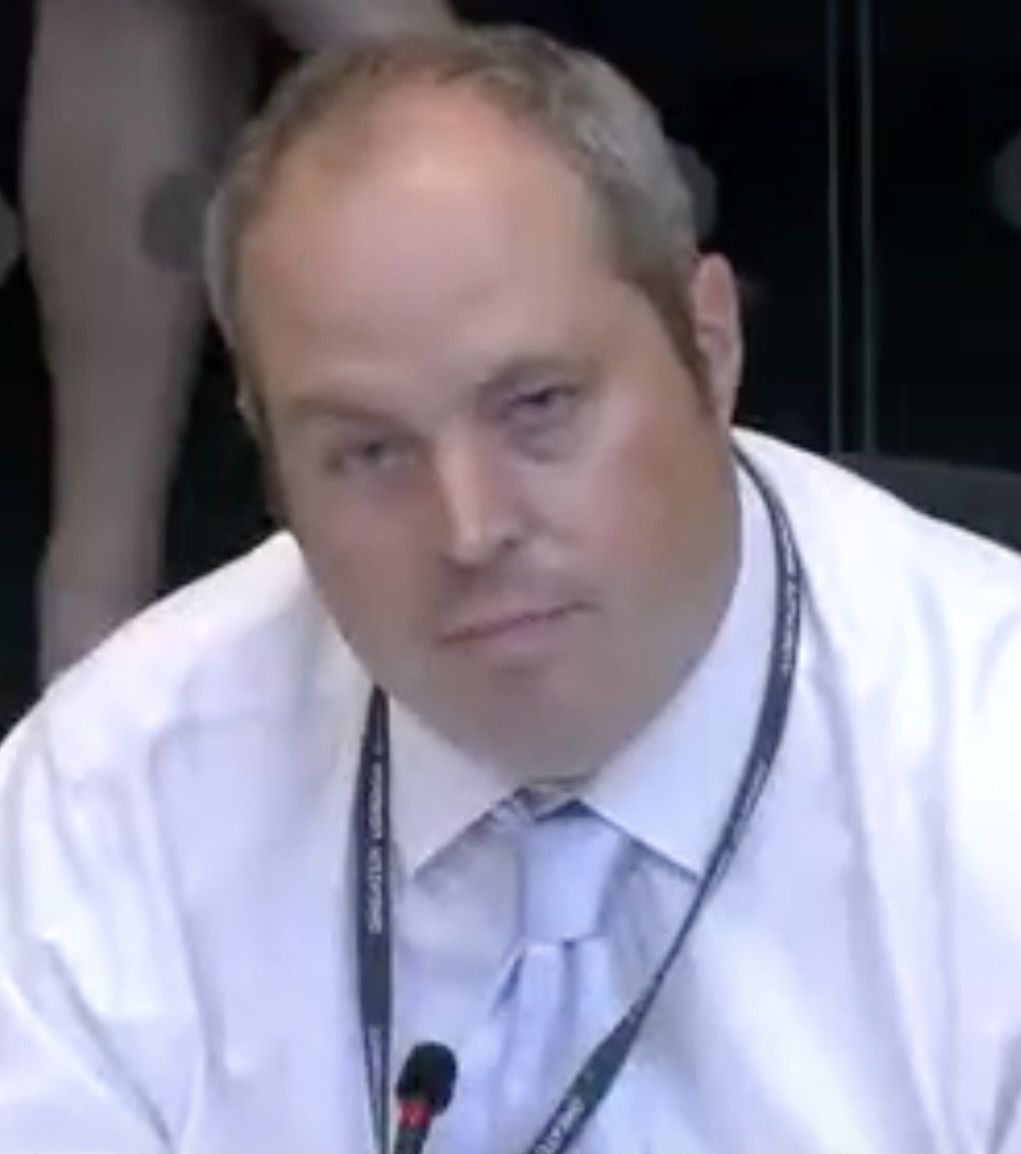
- Wilson in 2024

Leader of Reform UK in the London Assembly
- Incumbent
- Assumed office 6 May 2024
- Leader: Richard Tice; Nigel Farage
- Preceded by: Office established

Member of the London Assembly as an additional member
- Incumbent
- Assumed office 6 May 2024

Member of Redbridge London Borough Council for Wanstead
- In office 23 April 2009 – 22 May 2014

Personal details
- Born: February 1984 (age 42) Colchester, Essex, England
- Party: Reform UK (since 2020)
- Other political affiliations: Conservative (1999–2020)

Alexander James Wilson (born February 1984) is a British politician, serving as a member of the London Assembly (AM) as an additional since 2024. He is a member of Reform UK. He was previously a member of the Conservative Party for over twenty years and a Conservative Party councillor.

== Political career ==
=== Conservative Party ===
Wilson served as a Conservative Party on Redbridge London Borough Council from 2009 to 2014. He was asked to resign from his cabinet position by council leader Keith Prince and implied he had been accused of not dedicating enough time to his portfolio.

=== Reform UK ===
==== Defection ====
In 2020, after 21 years as a Conservative Party member, Wilson defected to Reform UK. He told the Evening Standard: "Lockdown was what drove me out [of the Tories], but then since then, it's high tax, it's net zero, it's not controlling the borders - it's all these kinds of issues which make me not even want to think about going back". In November 2025, Wilson joined a group of Reform figures in a visit to Israel where he visited a settlement in the Golan Heights – a place the UK government considers part of Syria. Wilson disclosed that Israel's foreign ministry had spent £4,861 on his visit.

==== Parliamentary and local candidacies ====
Wilson ran in the North East constituency at the 2021 London Assembly election, coming fifth with 4,251 votes (1.9%). He later contested the June 2021 Chesham and Amersham by-election, receiving 1.1% of the vote.

At the 2022 Redbridge London Borough Council election, he came second-to-last in the Bridge ward, polling 274 votes.

Wilson was the Reform candidate for the parliamentary constituency of Ilford North in the 2024 UK general election, where he finished fourth with 3,621 votes.

==== Member of the London Assembly ====
For the 2024 London Assembly election, Wilson stood in Havering and Redbridge, coming third, and receiving 19,696 votes. He was also the lead candidate on the Reform list for the London-wide region, and was the party's only candidate to be elected. At the time of his election, Wilson had been working as a pollster for Reform.

== Business career ==
Wilson is the sole director of Psephos Consulting, a public relations and communications firm established in 2017 and specialising in the property development industry.
