= Woodford (ward) =

Electoral ward in the London Borough of Redbridge

- Former electoral ward for the Redbridge London Borough Council
- Borough: Redbridge
- County: Greater London
- Population: 16,130 (1966 estimate)
- Electorate: 13,191 (1974)
- Major settlements: Woodford
- Area: 1,012.4 acres (4.097 km^{2})

Former electoral ward
- Created: 1965
- Abolished: 1978
- Councillors: 4

External images
- Map showing Woodford ward (east) boundaries from 1965 to 1978
- Map showing Woodford ward (west) boundaries from 1965 to 1978

Woodford was an electoral ward in the London Borough of Redbridge from 1965 to 1978. The ward was first used in the 1964 elections and last used for the 1974 elections, with a by-election in 1975. It returned four councillors to Redbridge London Borough Council. The ward covered Woodford. For elections to the Greater London Council, the ward was part of the Redbridge electoral division from 1965 and then the Wanstead and Woodford division from 1973. The ward was only represented by Conservative Party councillors, including David Evennett who became a member of parliament.

== List of councillors ==
The ward was represented by four councillors.

| Term | Councillor | Party |
|---|---|---|
| 1964–1968 | R. Dalton | Conservative |
| 1964–1968 | J. Harvey | Conservative |
| 1964–1978 | Fred Mountier | Conservative |
| 1964–1968 | R. Ayers | Conservative |
| 1968–1974 | H. Dedman | Conservative |
| 1968–1974 | J. Billingham | Conservative |
| 1968–1978 | N. Thurgood | Conservative |
| 1974–1978 | David Evennett | Conservative |
| 1974–1975 | H. Nicholson | Conservative |
| 1975–1978 | Leslie Bridgeman | Conservative |

== Redbridge council elections ==
=== 1975 by-election ===
The by-election took place on 19 November 1975.

1975 Woodford by-election
| Party | Candidate | Votes | % | ±% |
|---|---|---|---|---|
| Conservative | Leslie Bridgeman | 2,413 | | |
| Liberal | Sidney Cohen | 450 | | |
| Labour | Gwyneth Phillips | 284 | | |
| Turnout | | | 23.7 | |
| Conservative hold | | Swing | | |

=== 1974 election ===
The election took place on 2 May 1974.

1974 Redbridge London Borough Council election: Woodford
| Party | Candidate | Votes | % | ±% |
|---|---|---|---|---|
| Conservative | Fred Mountier | 3,616 | | |
| Conservative | N. Thurgood | 3,583 | | |
| Conservative | David Evennett | 3,577 | | |
| Conservative | H. Nicholson | 3,554 | | |
| Liberal | D. Gilby | 903 | | |
| Liberal | D. Blackett | 828 | | |
| Liberal | A. Griffiths | 793 | | |
| Liberal | G. Goldberg | 772 | | |
| Labour | P. Pollard | 576 | | |
| Labour | V. Pollard | 564 | | |
| Labour | J. Haworth | 550 | | |
| Labour | T. McKellar | 531 | | |
| Turnout | | | | |
| Conservative hold | | Swing | | |
| Conservative hold | | Swing | | |
| Conservative hold | | Swing | | |
| Conservative hold | | Swing | | |

=== 1971 election ===
The election took place on 13 May 1971.

1971 Redbridge London Borough Council election: Woodford
| Party | Candidate | Votes | % | ±% |
|---|---|---|---|---|
| Conservative | Fred Mountier | 3,413 | | |
| Conservative | N. Thurgood | 3,406 | | |
| Conservative | H. Dedman | 3,340 | | |
| Conservative | J. Billingham | 3,301 | | |
| Labour | J. D. Haworth | 764 | | |
| Labour | J. M. Haworth | 735 | | |
| Labour | P. Pollard | 735 | | |
| Labour | S. Madell | 675 | | |
| Liberal | D. Blackett | 472 | | |
| Liberal | B. Bray | 457 | | |
| Liberal | L. Dilloway | 375 | | |
| Independent | A. Land | 214 | | |
| Turnout | | | | |
| Conservative hold | | Swing | | |
| Conservative hold | | Swing | | |
| Conservative hold | | Swing | | |
| Conservative hold | | Swing | | |

=== 1968 election ===
The election took place on 9 May 1968.

1968 Redbridge London Borough Council election: Woodford
| Party | Candidate | Votes | % | ±% |
|---|---|---|---|---|
| Conservative | H. Dedman | 4,282 | | |
| Conservative | J. Billingham | 4,255 | | |
| Conservative | N. Thurgood | 4,212 | | |
| Conservative | Fred Mountier | 4,198 | | |
| Liberal | M. Hoskins | 676 | | |
| Liberal | L. Dilloway | 612 | | |
| Liberal | D. Blackett | 572 | | |
| Liberal | D. Payne | 539 | | |
| Labour | J. Mallinson | 314 | | |
| Labour | M. Stark | 277 | | |
| Labour | P. Pollard | 276 | | |
| Labour | H. Duffree | 266 | | |
| Turnout | | | | |
| Conservative hold | | Swing | | |
| Conservative hold | | Swing | | |
| Conservative hold | | Swing | | |
| Conservative hold | | Swing | | |

=== 1964 election ===
The election took place on 7 May 1964.

1964 Redbridge London Borough Council election: Woodford
| Party | Candidate | Votes | % | ±% |
|---|---|---|---|---|
| Conservative | R. Dalton | 3,851 | | |
| Conservative | J. Harvey | 3,840 | | |
| Conservative | Fred Mountier | 3,822 | | |
| Conservative | R. Ayers | 3,805 | | |
| Liberal | M. Wilding | 1,466 | | |
| Liberal | M. Hoskins | 1,429 | | |
| Liberal | G. Lloyd | 1,418 | | |
| Liberal | D. Bourne | 1,416 | | |
| Labour | P. Cave | 561 | | |
| Labour | P. Leighton | 546 | | |
| Labour | P. Leatham | 537 | | |
| Labour | P. Pollard | 537 | | |
| Turnout | | 5,782 | 49.7 | |
| Conservative win (new seat) | | | | |
| Conservative win (new seat) | | | | |
| Conservative win (new seat) | | | | |
| Conservative win (new seat) | | | | |
