= 1964 Redbridge London Borough Council election =

- 7 May 1964

All 60 Redbridge London Borough Council seats 31 seats needed for a majority

The 1964 Redbridge Council election took place on 7 May 1964 to elect members of Redbridge London Borough Council in London, England. The whole council was up for election and the Conservative Party gained control of the council.

== Background ==
These elections were the first to the newly formed borough. Previously elections had taken place in the Municipal Borough of Dagenham, Municipal Borough of Ilford, Municipal Borough of Wanstead and Woodford and Chigwell Urban District. These boroughs and districts were joined to form the new London Borough of Redbridge by the London Government Act 1963.

A total of 192 candidates stood in the election for the 60 seats being contested across 17 wards. These included a full slate from the Conservative, Labour and Liberal parties. Other candidates included 8 Communists and 4 Residents. There were 9 four-seat wards and 8 three-seat wards.

The council was elected in 1964 as a "shadow authority" but did not start operations until 1 April 1965.

== Results ==
=== General election of councillors ===
The results saw the Conservatives gain the new council with a majority of 30 after winning 45 of the 60 seats. Overall turnout in the election was 39.5%. This turnout included 1,023 postal votes.

=== Aldermanic election ===
In addition to the 60 councillors, there were ten aldermen elected by the council. The five aldermen with the fewest votes were elected to serve until 1967 (subsequently extended to 1968) and the other five until 1970 (subsequently extended to 1971). (Note: Terms were amended by the London Government Act 1967.)

The aldermen divided eight to the Conservatives and two to Labour.

== Ward results ==
=== Aldborough ===
Aldborough (3)
Party	Candidate	Votes	%	±%
Conservative	E. Harris	1,561		
Conservative	S. Loveless	1,533		
Conservative	C. Watson	1,529		
Labour	A. McKelvey	948		
Labour	E. Pye	877		
Labour	R. Westerbury	834		
Liberal	J. Carter	479		
Liberal	J. Hitchen	472		
Liberal	S. Hellak	465		
Turnout		2,986	30.7	
Conservative win (new seat)				
Conservative win (new seat)				
Conservative win (new seat)				

=== Barkingside ===
Barkingside (4)
Party	Candidate	Votes	%	±%
Conservative	S. Terry	2,265		
Conservative	T. Cobb	2,215		
Conservative	V. Grose	2,200		
Conservative	K. Webb	2,162		
Liberal	A. Yeoman	1,535		
Liberal	C. Shuman	1,489		
Liberal	H. Blow	1,402		
Liberal	P. Netherclift	1,365		
Labour	M. Drake	658		
Labour	J. Lethbridge	634		
Labour	R. Pavitt	618		
Labour	H. Duffree	610		
Turnout		4,342	40.8	
Conservative win (new seat)				
Conservative win (new seat)				
Conservative win (new seat)				
Conservative win (new seat)				

=== Bridge ===
Bridge (4)
Party	Candidate	Votes	%	±%
Conservative	A. Escott	2,443		
Conservative	L. Bridgeman	2,407		
Conservative	E. Hollis	2,405		
Conservative	H. Moss	2,377		
Labour	W. Robinson	1,870		
Labour	K. Dowling	1,683		
Labour	E. Jones	1,679		
Labour	D. Bonsor	1,632		
Liberal	T. Fox	1,441		
Liberal	K. Mountjoy	1,368		
Liberal	S. Fraser	1,367		
Liberal	E. Downing	1,318		
Communist	F. Browning	264		
Turnout		5,644	49.3	
Conservative win (new seat)				
Conservative win (new seat)				
Conservative win (new seat)				
Conservative win (new seat)				

=== Chadwell ===
Chadwell (4)
Party	Candidate	Votes	%	±%
Conservative	H. Bysouth	1,872		
Conservative	C. Gibson	1,817		
Conservative	N. Hurst	1,811		
Conservative	A. White	1,753		
Labour	W. Burgess	1,463		
Labour	G. King	1,404		
Labour	A. Willis	1,377		
Labour	A. Hutson	1,370		
Liberal	V. Mason	833		
Liberal	R. Ellis	831		
Liberal	E. Ives	793		
Liberal	J. Lorek	740		
Communist	L. Beard	111		
Turnout		4,119	36.0	
Conservative win (new seat)				
Conservative win (new seat)				
Conservative win (new seat)				
Conservative win (new seat)				

=== Clayhall ===
Clayhall (3)
Party	Candidate	Votes	%	±%
Conservative	C. Loveless	1,859		
Conservative	G. Chamberlin	1,856		
Conservative	J. Norwood	1,827		
Liberal	W. Bull	794		
Liberal	T. Tunney	787		
Liberal	M. Lorek	775		
Labour	G. Hales	451		
Labour	M. Pollard	445		
Labour	V. Baldock	438		
Turnout		3,072	32.4	
Conservative win (new seat)				
Conservative win (new seat)				
Conservative win (new seat)				

=== Clementswood ===
Clementswood (3)
Party	Candidate	Votes	%	±%
Labour	A. Shaw	1,643		
Labour	G. Watson	1,641		
Labour	G. Tovey	1,611		
Conservative	J. Doyle	1,142		
Conservative	P. Parrish	1,057		
Conservative	G. Brindley	1,012		
Liberal	J. Vincent	864		
Liberal	H. Gerrard	743		
Liberal	W. Harrold	729		
Turnout		3,549	40.5	
Labour win (new seat)				
Labour win (new seat)				
Labour win (new seat)				

=== Cranbrook ===
Cranbrook (4)
Party	Candidate	Votes	%	±%
Conservative	F. James	2,468		
Conservative	I. Natzler	2,437		
Conservative	F. Pearson	2,411		
Conservative	M. Paige	2,405		
Liberal	F. Grant	1,129		
Liberal	R. Newland	1,123		
Liberal	G. Wilson	1,115		
Liberal	E. Alms	1,055		
Labour	N. Young	569		
Labour	C. Soley	564		
Labour	M. Zeital	559		
Labour	G. Mountney	556		
Turnout		4,106	34.8	
Conservative win (new seat)				
Conservative win (new seat)				
Conservative win (new seat)				
Conservative win (new seat)				

=== Fairlop ===
Fairlop (3)
Party	Candidate	Votes	%	±%
Labour	E. O’Connor	1,562		
Labour	L. Emons	1,537		
Labour	D. Wightman	1,504		
Conservative	A. Follows	1,180		
Conservative	K. Harvey	1,145		
Conservative	J. Chamberlin	1,078		
Liberal	R. Giles	831		
Liberal	F. Fulle	819		
Liberal	G. Seabridge	815		
Turnout		3,479	33.2	
Labour win (new seat)				
Labour win (new seat)				
Labour win (new seat)				

=== Goodmayes ===
Goodmayes (3)
Party	Candidate	Votes	%	±%
Labour	D. Davies	1,772		
Labour	A. Clack	1,732		
Labour	J. Westerbury	1,649		
Conservative	D. Revington	765		
Conservative	A. Dixon	745		
Conservative	N. Thorne	733		
Liberal	E. Bowhil	317		
Liberal	P. Ritchie	315		
Liberal	B. Boon	289		
Communist	P. Ritchie	102		
Turnout				
Labour win (new seat)				
Labour win (new seat)				
Labour win (new seat)				

=== Hainault ===
Hainault (3)
Party	Candidate	Votes	%	±%
Labour	George Davies	2,685		
Labour	Sydney Gleed	2,668		
Labour	D. Smith	2,604		
Conservative	E. Low	453		
Conservative	J. Murphy	446		
Conservative	A. Ashton	422		
Liberal	P. Palmer	310		
Liberal	R. Scott	292		
Liberal	A. Yeoman	282		
Communist	P. Devine	161		
Turnout				
Labour win (new seat)				
Labour win (new seat)				
Labour win (new seat)				

=== Ilford ===
Ilford (3)
Party	Candidate	Votes	%	±%
Labour	L. Fallaize	1,538		
Labour	D. Carradice	1,450		
Labour	J. Ryder	1,417		
Conservative	B. Cooper	1,067		
Conservative	T. Bozet	1,006		
Conservative	A. Barker	961		
Liberal	K. Jaeger	445		
Liberal	J. Malcolm	406		
Liberal	K. Timmings	362		
Communist	P. Devine	106		
Turnout				
Labour win (new seat)				
Labour win (new seat)				
Labour win (new seat)				

=== Mayfield ===
Mayfield (4)
Party	Candidate	Votes	%	±%
Conservative	L. Gooch	1,960		
Conservative	Roland Hill	1,900		
Conservative	L. Hipkins	1,885		
Conservative	Bert Barker	1,793		
Liberal	G. Bellamy	1,509		
Liberal	G. Barrett	1,465		
Liberal	H. Parker	1,446		
Liberal	K. Ives	1,415		
Labour	N. Stringer	1,086		
Labour	J. Simmons	1,057		
Labour	T. Williams	1,044		
Labour	H. Jewitt	1,043		
Communist	R. Shannon	120		
Turnout				
Conservative win (new seat)				
Conservative win (new seat)				
Conservative win (new seat)				
Conservative win (new seat)				

=== Park ===
Park (3)
Party	Candidate	Votes	%	±%
Conservative	E. Earey	1,680		
Conservative	A. Toms	1,607		
Conservative	A. Branscombe	1,518		
Liberal	G. Frost	1,047		
Liberal	S. Cannon	1,028		
Labour	S. Brooks	978		
Liberal	G. McDonough	951		
Labour	S. Haywood	927		
Labour	P. Condon	880		
Communist	E. Burke	120		
Turnout				
Conservative win (new seat)				
Conservative win (new seat)				
Conservative win (new seat)				

=== Seven Kings ===
Seven Kings (4)
Party	Candidate	Votes	%	±%
Conservative	H. Aly	1,657		
Conservative	H. Root	1,656		
Conservative	V. Ferrier	1,649		
Conservative	H. Cowan	1,642		
Labour	H. Copsey	983		
Labour	M. Powers	983		
Labour	F. Watts	973		
Labour	A. Osborne	961		
Liberal	L. Bowyer	544		
Liberal	D. Hellings	527		
Liberal	J. Stonham	514		
Liberal	E. Nater	498		
Turnout		3,169	29.9	
Conservative win (new seat)				
Conservative win (new seat)				
Conservative win (new seat)				
Conservative win (new seat)				

=== Snaresbrook ===
Snaresbrook (4)
Party	Candidate	Votes	%	±%
Conservative	J. Telford	2,689		
Conservative	D. Mullett	2,688		
Conservative	W. Roberts	2,679		
Conservative	O. Hall	2,658		
Liberal	S. Honey	1,723		
Liberal	R. Baldwin	1,709		
Liberal	H. Couch	1,709		
Liberal	G. Brown	1,670		
Labour	L. Bourne	643		
Labour	G. Phillips	623		
Labour	E. Ingall	559		
Labour	J. Lewis	552		
Turnout		4,935	47.4	
Conservative win (new seat)				
Conservative win (new seat)				
Conservative win (new seat)				
Conservative win (new seat)				

=== Wanstead ===
Wanstead (4)
Party	Candidate	Votes	%	±%
Conservative	J. Vane	2,571		
Conservative	V. Wilson	2,428		
Conservative	B. Hamilton	2,345		
Conservative	A. Reynolds	2,293		
Residents	J. Challis	1,737		
Residents	J. Charter	1,627		
Residents	J. Walsh	1,537		
Residents	J. Harrison	1,536		
Liberal	D. Carter	862		
Liberal	J. Williams	825		
Liberal	R. MacDonald	733		
Liberal	J. Coral	696		
Labour	A. Colmer	622		
Labour	F. Strudwick	611		
Labour	P. Jones	600		
Labour	M. Stark	562		
Communist	E. Devine	109		
Turnout		5,446	50.4	
Conservative win (new seat)				
Conservative win (new seat)				
Conservative win (new seat)				
Conservative win (new seat)				

=== Woodford ===
Woodford (4)
Party	Candidate	Votes	%	±%
Conservative	R. Dalton	3,851		
Conservative	J. Harvey	3,840		
Conservative	Fred Mountier	3,822		
Conservative	R. Ayers	3,805		
Liberal	M. Wilding	1,466		
Liberal	M. Hoskins	1,429		
Liberal	G. Lloyd	1,418		
Liberal	D. Bourne	1,416		
Labour	P. Cave	561		
Labour	P. Leighton	546		
Labour	P. Leatham	537		
Labour	P. Pollard	537		
Turnout		5,782	49.7	
Conservative win (new seat)				
Conservative win (new seat)				
Conservative win (new seat)				
Conservative win (new seat)				
