= Fairlop (ward) =

Electoral ward in Redbridge, London

- Electoral ward for the Redbridge London Borough Council
- Fairlop ward boundaries since 2018
- Borough: Redbridge
- County: Greater London
- Population: 14,714 (2021)
- Electorate: 10,104 (2022)
- Area: 3.040 square kilometres (1.174 sq mi)

Current electoral ward
- Created: 1965
- Number of members: 3
- Councillors: Joyce Ryan; Ruth Clark; Bob Chattaway
- GSS code: E05000503 (2002–2018); E05011242 (since 2018)

Fairlop is an electoral ward in the London Borough of Redbridge. The ward has existed since the creation of the borough on 1 April 1965 and was first used in the 1964 elections. It returns three councillors to Redbridge London Borough Council.

== Redbridge council elections since 2018 ==
There was a revision of ward boundaries in Redbridge in 2018.

=== 2022 election ===
The election took place on 5 May 2022.

2022 Redbridge London Borough Council election: Fairlop
Party	Candidate	Votes	%	±%
Conservative	Ruth Clark	1,657	47.6	▼7.9
Conservative	Joyce Ryan	1,626	46.7	▼7.9
Labour	Bob Chattaway	1,616	46.4	▲6.7
Conservative	Howard Berlin	1,608	46.2	▼9.3
Labour	Sareena Sanger	1,498	43.0	▲7.6
Labour	Mazhar Saleem	1,377	39.5	▲6.0
Liberal Democrats	Joel Winston	330	9.5	▲2.5
Turnout		3,483	34.5	▼2.7
Conservative hold		Swing		
Conservative hold		Swing		
Labour gain from Conservative		Swing		

=== 2018 election ===
The election took place on 3 May 2018.

2018 Redbridge London Borough Council election: Fairlop
Party	Candidate	Votes	%	±%
Conservative	Howard Berlin	2,044	55.51	N/A
Conservative	Joyce Ryan	2,011	54.62	N/A
Conservative	Ruth Clark	1,948	52.91	N/A
Labour	Bob Chattaway	1,462	39.71	N/A
Labour	Nirojan Raveendralingam	1,303	35.39	N/A
Labour	Kris Sangani	1,232	33.46	N/A
Liberal Democrats	Joel Winston	256	6.95	N/A
Turnout		3,682	37.22	
Conservative win (new boundaries)				
Conservative win (new boundaries)				
Conservative win (new boundaries)				

== 2002–2018 Redbridge council elections ==
There was a revision of ward boundaries in Redbridge in 2002.

== 1978–2002 Redbridge council elections ==
=== 1998 election ===
The election took place on 7 May 1998.

=== 1994 election ===
The election took place on 5 May 1994.

=== 1990 election ===
The election took place on 3 May 1990.

=== 1986 election ===
The election took place on 8 May 1986.

=== 1982 election ===
The election took place on 6 May 1982.

=== 1978 election ===
The election took place on 4 May 1978.

== 1964–1978 Redbridge council elections ==
=== 1977 by-election ===
The by-election took place on 30 June 1977.

1977 Fairlop by-election
Party	Candidate	Votes	%	±%
Conservative	Michael Kirrage	2,116		
Labour	Raymond Smith	835		
National Front	John Hughes	176		
Liberal	Peter Briggs	155		
Turnout			30.2	
Conservative gain from Labour		Swing		

=== 1974 election ===
The election took place on 2 May 1974.

1974 Redbridge London Borough Council election: Fairlop (3)
Party	Candidate	Votes	%	±%
Labour	B. Davies	1,610		
Labour	H. Kober	1,544		
Labour	A. Tapper	1,525		
Conservative	T. Jacobs	1,425		
Conservative	M. Kirrage	1,380		
Conservative	P. McDonnell	1,371		
Liberal	P. Briggs	552		
Liberal	G. Seabridge	545		
Liberal	V. Schuman	542		
Turnout				
Labour hold		Swing		
Labour hold		Swing		
Labour hold		Swing		

=== 1971 election ===
The election took place on 13 May 1971.

1971 Redbridge London Borough Council election: Fairlop (3)
Party	Candidate	Votes	%	±%
Labour	B. Davies	1,934		
Labour	H. Kober	1,791		
Labour	A. Tapper	1,746		
Conservative	A. Follows	1,323		
Conservative	I. Cameron	1,295		
Conservative	K. Harvey	1,260		
Liberal	J. Graham	298		
Liberal	R. Scott	275		
Liberal	D. Swindell	261		
Turnout				
Labour gain from Conservative		Swing		
Labour gain from Conservative		Swing		
Labour gain from Conservative		Swing		

=== 1968 election ===
The election took place on 9 May 1968.

1968 Redbridge London Borough Council election: Fairlop (3)
Party	Candidate	Votes	%	±%
Conservative	D. Elliott	2,207		
Conservative	A. Follows	2,173		
Conservative	K. Harvey	2,125		
Labour	L. Emons	892		
Labour	G. Jarman	817		
Labour	N. Young	802		
Liberal	G. Seabridge	316		
Liberal	D. Swindell	296		
Liberal	D. Bigg	292		
Turnout				
Conservative gain from Labour		Swing		
Conservative gain from Labour		Swing		
Conservative gain from Labour		Swing		

=== 1964 election ===
The election took place on 7 May 1964.

1964 Redbridge London Borough Council election: Fairlop (3)
Party	Candidate	Votes	%	±%
Labour	E. O’Connor	1,562		
Labour	L. Emons	1,537		
Labour	D. Wightman	1,504		
Conservative	A. Follows	1,180		
Conservative	K. Harvey	1,145		
Conservative	J. Chamberlin	1,078		
Liberal	R. Giles	831		
Liberal	F. Fulle	819		
Liberal	G. Seabridge	815		
Turnout		3,479	33.2	
Labour win (new seat)				
Labour win (new seat)				
Labour win (new seat)				
