= Wanstead (ward) =

- Former electoral ward for the Redbridge London Borough Council
- Wanstead ward boundaries from 2002 to 2018
- Borough: Redbridge
- County: Greater London
- Population: 11,543 (2011)
- Electorate: 9,157 (2014)
- Major settlements: Wanstead

Former electoral ward
- Created: 1965
- Abolished: 2018
- Councillors: 1965–1978: 4; 1978–2018: 3
- Replaced by: Clayhall, Wanstead Park, Wanstead Village
- ONS code: 00BCGU
- GSS code: E05000515

Wanstead was an electoral ward in the London Borough of Redbridge from 1965 to 2018. The ward was first used in the 1964 elections and last used for the 2014 elections. It returned three councillors to Redbridge London Borough Council. It was subject to boundary revisions on 1978 and 2002. The 1978 revision reduced the number of councillors from four to three.

== 2002–2018 Redbridge council elections ==
=== 2014 election ===
The election took place on 22 May 2014.

2014 Redbridge London Borough Council election: Wanstead (3)
Party	Candidate	Votes	%	±%
Turnout				
	Labour gain from Conservative	Swing		
	Labour gain from Conservative	Swing		
	Conservative hold	Swing		

=== 2010 election ===
The election on 6 May 2010 took place on the same day as the United Kingdom general election.

2010 Redbridge London Borough Council election: Wanstead (3)
Party	Candidate	Votes	%	±%
Turnout				
	Conservative hold	Swing		
	Conservative hold	Swing		
	Conservative hold	Swing		

=== 2009 by-election ===
The by-election took place on 23 April 2009, following the death of Allan Burgess.

2009 Wanstead by-election
Party	Candidate	Votes	%	±%
Conservative	Alex Wilson	1,300		
Liberal Democrats	Kate Garrett	1030		
Labour	Ross Hatfull	694		
Green	Ashley Gunstock	256		
BNP	Alfred John	171		
UKIP	Nick Jones	33		
Turnout				
Conservative hold		Swing		

=== 2006 election ===
The election took place on 4 May 2006.

2006 Redbridge London Borough Council election: Wanstead (3)
Party	Candidate	Votes	%	±%
Conservative	Allan Burgess	1,946	42.9	
Conservative	Michelle Dunn	1,746		
Conservative	Tak Leung Chan	1,617		
Labour	Jeffery Edelman	1,255	27.6	
Labour	Ross Hatfull	1,066		
Labour	Nikolai Segura	956		
Green	Ashley Gunstock	810	17.8	
Liberal Democrats	Alan Cornish	528	11.6	
Liberal Democrats	Janet Cornish	526		
Liberal Democrats	Pamela Winborne	507		
Turnout			44.9	
Conservative hold		Swing		
Conservative hold		Swing		
Conservative hold		Swing		

=== 2002 election ===
The election took place on 2 May 2002.

2002 Redbridge London Borough Council election: Wanstead (3)
Party	Candidate	Votes	%	±%
	Conservative win (new boundaries)			
	Conservative win (new boundaries)			
	Conservative win (new boundaries)			

== 1978–2002 Redbridge council elections ==
=== 1998 election ===
The election took place on 7 May 1998.

=== 1994 election ===
The election took place on 5 May 1994.

=== 1990 election ===
The election took place on 3 May 1990.

=== 1986 election ===
The election took place on 8 May 1986.

=== 1982 election ===
The election took place on 6 May 1982.

=== 1978 election ===
The election took place on 4 May 1978.

== 1964–1978 Redbridge council elections ==
=== 1976 by-election ===
The by-election took place on 24 June 1976.

1976 Wanstead by-election
Party	Candidate	Votes	%	±%
Conservative	John Allan	1,892		
Liberal	Alan Cornish	1,166		
Labour	Gwyneth Phillips	424		
Turnout			29.2	
Conservative hold		Swing		

=== 1974 election ===
The election took place on 2 May 1974.

=== 1971 election ===
The election took place on 13 May 1971.

=== 1968 election ===
The election took place on 9 May 1968.

1968 Redbridge London Borough Council election: Wanstead (4)
Party	Candidate	Votes	%	±%
Conservative	J. Vane	2,963		
Conservative	B. Hamilton	2,844		
Conservative	V. Wilson	2,843		
Conservative	A. Reynolds	2,822		
Residents	J. Charter	2,439		
Residents	J. Duggan	2,278		
Residents	C. Blake	2,270		
Residents	W. Gibbons	2,233		
Labour	D. Runnicles	297		
Labour	A. Land	270		
Labour	J. Lewis	253		
Labour	J. Savill	234		
Communist	D. Haynes	136		
Turnout				
Conservative hold		Swing		
Conservative hold		Swing		
Conservative hold		Swing		
Conservative hold		Swing		

=== 1964 election ===
The election took place on 7 May 1964.

1964 Redbridge London Borough Council election: Wanstead (4)
Party	Candidate	Votes	%	±%
Conservative	J. Vane	2,571		
Conservative	V. Wilson	2,428		
Conservative	B. Hamilton	2,345		
Conservative	A. Reynolds	2,293		
Residents	J. Challis	1,737		
Residents	J. Charter	1,627		
Residents	J. Walsh	1,537		
Residents	J. Harrison	1,536		
Liberal	D. Carter	862		
Liberal	J. Williams	825		
Liberal	R. MacDonald	733		
Liberal	J. Coral	696		
Labour	A. Colmer	622		
Labour	F. Strudwick	611		
Labour	P. Jones	600		
Labour	M. Stark	562		
Communist	E. Devine	109		
Turnout		5,446	50.4	
Conservative win (new seat)				
Conservative win (new seat)				
Conservative win (new seat)				
Conservative win (new seat)				
