= Barkingside (ward) =

Electoral ward in the London Borough of Redbridge

- Electoral ward for the Redbridge London Borough Council
- Barkingside ward boundaries since 2018
- Borough: Redbridge
- County: Greater London
- Population: 15,325 (2021)
- Electorate: 10,664 (2022)
- Area: 1.668 square kilometres (0.644 sq mi)

Current electoral ward
- Created: 1965
- Number of members: 1965–1978: 4; 1978–present: 3
- Councillors: Judith Garfield; Martin Sachs; Mark Santos
- GSS code: E05000496 (2002–2018); E05011235 (2018–present)

Barkingside is an electoral ward in the London Borough of Redbridge. The ward has existed since the creation of the borough on 1 April 1965 and was first used in the 1964 elections. It returns three councillors to Redbridge London Borough Council.

== Redbridge council elections since 2018 ==
There was a revision of ward boundaries in Redbridge in 2018.

=== 2022 election ===
The election took place on 5 May 2022.

2022 Redbridge London Borough Council election: Barkingside
Party	Candidate	Votes	%	±%
Labour	Judith Garfield	1,994	50.0	▼2.7
Labour	Martin Sachs	1,806	45.3	▼5.5
Labour	Mark Santos	1,739	43.6	▼4.8
Conservative	Kartik Parekh	1,609	40.3	▼2.3
Conservative	Daniel Moraru	1,550	38.8	▼1.5
Conservative	Wesley Manta	1,505	37.7	▼2.5
Liberal Democrats	Irfan Mustafa	380	9.5	New
Ind. Network	Riaz Bhatti	375	9.4	New
Turnout		3,990	37.4	▼6.9
Labour hold		Swing		
Labour hold		Swing		
Labour hold		Swing		

=== 2018 election ===
The election took place on 3 May 2018.

2018 Redbridge London Borough Council election: Barkingside
Party	Candidate	Votes	%	±%
Labour	Judith Garfield	2,457	52.75	N/A
Labour	Martin Sachs	2,365	50.77	N/A
Labour	Mohammed Noor	2,255	48.41	N/A
Conservative	Ashley Kissin	1,984	42.59	N/A
Conservative	Melvyn Marks	1,879	40.34	N/A
Conservative	Karen Packer	1,876	40.27	N/A
Green	Deborah Fink	385	8.27	N/A
Turnout		4,658	44.32	
Labour win (new boundaries)				
Labour win (new boundaries)				
Labour win (new boundaries)				

== 2002–2018 Redbridge council elections ==
Barkingside ward boundaries from 2002 to 2018

There was a revision of ward boundaries in Redbridge in 2002.

=== 2014 election ===
The election took place on 22 May 2014.

2014 Redbridge London Borough Council election: Barkingside (3)
Party	Candidate	Votes	%	±%
Conservative	Ashley Kissin	2,007		
Conservative	Karen Packer	1,995		
Conservative	Keith Prince	1,992		
Labour	Martin Sachs	1,795		
Labour	Vinaya Sharma	1,741		
Labour	Ayub Khan	1,719		
UKIP	Robert Whitehall	366		
Turnout				
Conservative hold		Swing		
Conservative hold		Swing		
Conservative hold		Swing		

=== 2010 election ===
The election on 6 May 2010 took place on the same day as the United Kingdom general election.

2010 Redbridge London Borough Council election: Barkingside (3)
Party	Candidate	Votes	%	±%
Conservative	Ashley Kissin	2,861		
Conservative	Keith Prince	2,808		
Conservative	Tania Solomon	2,734		
Labour	Kamran Choudhry	2,239		
Labour	Sanjib Bhattacharjee	2,130		
Labour	Matthew Kay	2,111		
Liberal Democrats	Varughese Matthews	881		
Liberal Democrats	Stephanie Sinclair	749		
Liberal Democrats	Allan Yeoman	641		
Green	Jonathan Buckner	383		
Turnout			65.9	+24.7
Conservative hold		Swing		
Conservative hold		Swing		
Conservative hold		Swing		

=== 2006 election ===
The election took place on 4 May 2006.

2006 Redbridge London Borough Council election: Barkingside (3)
Party	Candidate	Votes	%	±%
Conservative	Graham Borrott	1,976	57.9	
Conservative	Keith Prince	1,963		
Conservative	Ashley Kissin	1,958		
Labour	Sam Hardy	1,036	30.3	
Labour	Irfan Mustafa	993		
Labour	Kezhakeadathu Mathews	975		
Liberal Democrats	Florence Boyland	402	11.8	
Liberal Democrats	Joan Barmby	389		
Liberal Democrats	Christina Bradd	385		
Turnout			41.2	
Conservative hold		Swing		
Conservative hold		Swing		
Conservative hold		Swing		

=== 2003 by-election ===
The by-election took place on 10 April 2003, following the death of Keith Axon.

2003 Barkingside by-election
Party	Candidate	Votes	%	±%
Conservative	Keith Prince	1,468	49.0	−5.0
Labour	Taifur Rashid	985	32.8	−1.9
Liberal Democrats	Matthew Lake	341	11.3	−0.1
BNP	Julian Leppert	116	3.9	+3.9
CPA	James Hargreaves	56	1.9	+1.9
Independent	Martin Levin	39	1.3	+1.3
Majority		483	16.2	
Turnout		3,005	35.2	
Conservative hold		Swing		

=== 2002 election ===
The election took place on 2 May 2002.

2002 Redbridge London Borough Council election: Barkingside
Party	Candidate	Votes	%
Conservative	Keith Axon	1,766	18.9
Conservative	Graham Borrott	1,727	18.5
Conservative	Roy Brunnen	1,716	18.4
Labour	Meredith Hilton	1,135	12.1
Labour	Taifur Rashid	1,017	10.9
Labour	Mahmood Rauf	924	9.9
Liberal Democrats	Dominic Black	372	3.9
Liberal Democrats	Valerie Taylor	336	3.6
Liberal Democrats	James Swallow	331	3.5
Turnout		9324	39.4
Conservative win (new boundaries)			
Conservative win (new boundaries)			
Conservative win (new boundaries)			

== 1978–2002 Redbridge council elections ==
There was a revision of ward boundaries in Redbridge in 1978.

=== 1998 election ===
The election took place on 7 May 1998.

1998 Redbridge London Borough Council election: Barkingside (3)
Party	Candidate	Votes	%	±%
Conservative	Keith Axon	1,636	47.24	▲0.46
Conservative	Graham Borrott	1,629		
Conservative	Roy Brunnen	1,592		
Labour	Norman Hilton	1,548	43.91	▲7.00
Labour	Raj Chanan	1,494		
Labour	Edward Skelton	1,472		
Liberal Democrats	Valerie Taylor	306	8.85	▼7.46
Liberal Democrats	Anne Peterson	305		
Liberal Democrats	Albert Williamson	299		
Registered electors		9,828		▲366
Turnout		3,666	37.30	▼8.55
Rejected ballots		14	0.38	▲0.29
Conservative hold				
Conservative hold				
Conservative hold				

=== 1996 by-election ===
The by-election took place on 10 October 1996, following the death of Thomas Cobb.

1996 Barkingside by-election
Party	Candidate	Votes	%	±%
Conservative	Graham Borrett	1,549	47.7	
Labour	Robert Littlewood	1,525	46.9	
Liberal Democrats	Albert Williamson	176	5.4	
Majority		24	0.8	
Turnout		3,250	33.6	
Conservative hold		Swing		

== 1964–1978 Redbridge council elections ==
=== 1968 election ===
The election took place on 9 May 1968.

1968 Redbridge London Borough Council election: Barkingside (4)
Party	Candidate	Votes	%	±%
Conservative	V. Grose	2,719		
Conservative	H. Watts	2,699		
Conservative	T. Cobb	2,690		
Conservative	K. Webb	2,662		
Liberal	C. Shuman	430		
Liberal	E. Ives	404		
Liberal	C. Jakens	379		
Liberal	E. Thompson	373		
Labour	C. Dicker	371		
Labour	M. Drake	363		
Labour	N. Saponia	325		
Labour	J. Smithson	312		
Turnout				
Conservative hold		Swing		
Conservative hold		Swing		
Conservative hold		Swing		
Conservative hold		Swing		

=== 1964 election ===
The election took place on 7 May 1964.

1964 Redbridge London Borough Council election: Barkingside (4)
Party	Candidate	Votes	%	±%
Conservative	S. Terry	2,265		
Conservative	T. Cobb	2,215		
Conservative	V. Grose	2,200		
Conservative	K. Webb	2,162		
Liberal	A. Yeoman	1,535		
Liberal	C. Shuman	1,489		
Liberal	H. Blow	1,402		
Liberal	P. Netherclift	1,365		
Labour	M. Drake	658		
Labour	J. Lethbridge	634		
Labour	R. Pavitt	618		
Labour	H. Duffree	610		
Turnout		4,342	40.8	
Conservative win (new seat)				
Conservative win (new seat)				
Conservative win (new seat)				
Conservative win (new seat)				
