= Bridge (Redbridge ward) =

Electoral ward in the London borough of Redbridge

- Electoral ward for the Redbridge London Borough Council
- Bridge ward boundaries since 2018
- Borough: Redbridge
- County: Greater London
- Population: 13,391 (2021)
- Electorate: 9,549 (2022)
- Area: 3.271 square kilometres (1.263 sq mi)

Current electoral ward
- Created: 1965
- Number of members: 1965–1978: 4; 1978–present: 3
- Councillors: Syeda Choudhury; Gurdial Bhamra; Paul Canal
- GSS code: E05000497 (2002–2018); E05011236 (2018–present)

Bridge is an electoral ward in the London Borough of Redbridge. The ward has existed since the creation of the borough on 1 April 1965 and was first used in the 1964 elections. It returns three councillors to Redbridge London Borough Council.

== Redbridge council elections since 2018 ==
There was a revision of ward boundaries in Redbridge in 2018.

=== 2022 election ===
The election took place on 5 May 2022.

2022 Redbridge London Borough Council election: Bridge
Party	Candidate	Votes	%	±%
Labour	Syeda Choudhury	1,470	36.8	▼5.0
Labour	Gurdial Bhamra	1,454	36.4	▼8.9
Conservative	Paul Canal	1,351	33.9	▼15.4
Labour	Kamal Qureshi	1,343	33.7	▼10.4
Conservative	Has Ahmed	1,265	31.7	▼17.0
Conservative	Sheree Rackham	1,224	30.7	▼14.9
Green	Rachel Collinson	564	14.1	▲1.1
Liberal Democrats	Claire Hunt	354	8.9	New
Reform	Alex Wilson	274	6.9	New
Liberal Democrats	Christopher Pallet	255	6.4	New
Turnout		3,991	35.5	▼2.7
Labour gain from Conservative		Swing		
Labour gain from Conservative		Swing		
Conservative hold		Swing		

=== 2018 election ===
The election took place on 3 May 2018.

2018 Redbridge London Borough Council election: Bridge
Party	Candidate	Votes	%	±%
Conservative	Paul Canal	1,735	49.30	N/A
Conservative	Anita Boateng	1,714	48.71	N/A
Conservative	Robin Turbefield	1,605	45.61	N/A
Labour	Lloyd Duddridge	1,593	45.27	N/A
Labour	Guy Williams	1,552	44.10	N/A
Labour	Ellie Taylor	1,470	41.77	N/A
Green	David Reynolds	456	12.96	N/A
Turnout		3,519	36.19	
Conservative win (new boundaries)				
Conservative win (new boundaries)				
Conservative win (new boundaries)				

== 2002–2018 Redbridge council elections ==
Bridge ward boundaries from 2002 to 2018

There was a revision of ward boundaries in Redbridge in 2002.

=== 2014 election ===
The election took place on 22 May 2014.

=== 2010 election ===
The election on 6 May 2010 took place on the same day as the United Kingdom general election.

2010 Redbridge London Borough Council election: Bridge
Party	Candidate	Votes	%	±%
Conservative	Paul Canal	2,538		
Conservative	John Fairley-Churchill	2,484		
Conservative	Robin Turbefield	2,161		
Labour	Garry Chick-Mackay	1,579		
Labour	David Pearce	1,297		
Labour	Chris Stone	1,241		
Liberal Democrats	Janet Cornish	1,032		
Liberal Democrats	Pat Ilett	1,015		
Liberal Democrats	Angela Yeoman	1,012		
BNP	Danny Warville	751		
Turnout			65.2	+30.2
Conservative hold		Swing		
Conservative hold		Swing		
Conservative hold		Swing		

=== 2006 by-election ===
The by-election took place on 13 July 2006, following the death of James Leal.

2006 Bridge by-election
Party	Candidate	Votes	%	±%
Conservative	Geoffrey Hinds	1,014	39.6	−13.1
BNP	Daniel Warville	857	33.4	+33.4
Labour	Mark Epstein	299	11.7	−7.2
Liberal Democrats	Angela Yeoman	245	9.6	−5.9
Green	David Reynolds	147	5.7	−7.1
Majority		157	6.2	
Turnout		2,562	30.3	
Conservative hold		Swing		

=== 2006 election ===
The election took place on 4 May 2006.

2006 Redbridge London Borough Council election: Bridge
Party	Candidate	Votes	%	±%
Conservative	John Fairley-Churchill	1,665	52.7	
Conservative	James Leal	1,617		
Conservative	Robin Turbefield	1,521		
Labour	Lucinda Culpin	598	18.9	
Labour	Neil McKellar	510		
Labour	Martin Chew	507		
Liberal Democrats	Angela Yeoman	490	15.5	
Liberal Democrats	Valerie Taylor	464		
Liberal Democrats	Andrew Diamond	422		
Green	David Reynolds	404	12.8	
Turnout			35.0	
Conservative hold		Swing		
Conservative hold		Swing		
Conservative hold		Swing		

=== 2002 election ===
The election took place on 2 May 2002.

== 1978–2002 Redbridge council elections ==
Bridge ward boundaries from 1978 to 1995

There was a revision of ward boundaries in Redbridge in 1978. The boundaries of the ward were revised in 1995.

=== 1998 election ===
The election took place on 7 May 1998.

1998 Redbridge London Borough Council election: Bridge
Party	Candidate	Votes	%	±%
Conservative	Peter Lawrence	1,463	45.34	
Conservative	Claire Cooper	1,382		
Conservative	Morris Hickey	1,360		
Labour	Barbara Cohen	1,241	37.94	
Labour	Maureen Lambert	1,212		
Labour	Mohammed Sheikh	1,066		
Liberal Democrats	Colin Daren	357	11.13	
Liberal Democrats	Madeline Sinclair	341		
Liberal Democrats	Nicolette Pashby	331		
Socialist Labour	Nicola Hoarau	173	5.59	
Registered electors		9,389		
Turnout		3,284	34.98	
Rejected ballots		13	0.40	
Conservative win (new boundaries)				
Conservative win (new boundaries)				
Conservative win (new boundaries)				

=== 1994 election ===
The election took place on 5 May 1994.

1994 Redbridge London Borough Council election: Bridge
Party	Candidate	Votes	%	±%
Labour	Coral Jackson	1,666	41.19	▲7.21
Conservative	Peter Lawrence	1,640	42.11	▼4.53
Conservative	Morris Hickey	1,583		
Conservative	Tak Chan	1,566		
Labour	Robert Littlewood	1,556		
Labour	Mohammed Sheikh	1,461		
Liberal Democrats	Leslie Everest	657	16.70	▲8.45
Liberal Democrats	Nicolette Pashby	649		
Liberal Democrats	James Swallow	594		
Registered electors		8,379		▼366
Turnout		4,131	49.30	▼0.56
Rejected ballots		5	0.12	▲0.05
Labour gain from Conservative				
Conservative hold				
Conservative hold				

== 1964–1978 Redbridge council elections ==
External image
- Map showing Bridge ward boundaries from 1965 to 1978

=== 1968 election ===
The election took place on 9 May 1968.

1968 Redbridge London Borough Council election: Bridge (4)
Party	Candidate	Votes	%	±%
Conservative	A. Escott	2,614		
Conservative	L. Bridgeman	2,592		
Conservative	R. Underwood	2,573		
Conservative	D. Stephens	2,492		
Liberal	S. Fraser	478		
Liberal	G. Grindley	441		
Liberal	M. Silverston	440		
Liberal	R. Scott	433		
Labour	C. Lamb	399		
Labour	R. Tomlinson	398		
Labour	A. Carter	386		
Labour	R. Andrews	327		
Communist	S. Brown	183		
Turnout				
Conservative hold		Swing		
Conservative hold		Swing		
Conservative hold		Swing		
Conservative hold		Swing		

=== 1964 election ===
The election took place on 7 May 1964.

1964 Redbridge London Borough Council election: Bridge (4)
Party	Candidate	Votes	%	±%
Conservative	A. Escott	2,443		
Conservative	L. Bridgeman	2,407		
Conservative	E. Hollis	2,405		
Conservative	H. Moss	2,377		
Labour	W. Robinson	1,870		
Labour	K. Dowling	1,683		
Labour	E. Jones	1,679		
Labour	D. Bonsor	1,632		
Liberal	T. Fox	1,441		
Liberal	K. Mountjoy	1,368		
Liberal	S. Fraser	1,367		
Liberal	E. Downing	1,318		
Communist	F. Browning	264		
Turnout		5,644	49.3	
Conservative win (new seat)				
Conservative win (new seat)				
Conservative win (new seat)				
Conservative win (new seat)				
