= Seven Kings (ward) =

Electoral ward in Redbridge, London

- Electoral ward for the Redbridge London Borough Council
- Seven Kings ward boundaries since 2018
- Borough: Redbridge
- County: Greater London
- Population: 15,046 (2021)
- Electorate: 9,878 (2022)
- Area: 1.871 square kilometres (0.722 sq mi)

Current electoral ward
- Created: 1965
- Number of members: 1965–1978: 4; 1978–present: 3
- Councillors: Pushpita Gupta; Nav Johal; Sadiq Kothia
- GSS code: E05000512 (2002–2018); E05011251 (since 2018)

Seven Kings is an electoral ward in the London Borough of Redbridge. The ward has existed since the creation of the borough on 1 April 1965 and was first used in the 1964 elections. It returns councillors to Redbridge London Borough Council.

== Redbridge council elections since 2018 ==
There was a revision of ward boundaries in Redbridge in 2018.

=== 2022 election ===
The election took place on 5 May 2022.

2022 Redbridge London Borough Council election: Seven Kings
Party	Candidate	Votes	%	±%
Labour	Pushpita Gupta	1,707	62.8	▼14.8
Labour	Nav Johal	1,705	62.8	▼9.2
Labour	Sadiq Kothia	1,609	59.2	▼14.8
TUSC	Andy Walker	568	20.9	New
Conservative	Aamer Hamid	515	19.0	▼1.8
Conservative	Avtar Sehmbi	471	17.3	▼0.0
Conservative	Kunle Olaifa	420	15.5	▼1.7
Ind. Network	Sajida Ugradar	316	11.6	New
Turnout		2,716	27.5	▼7.5
Labour hold		Swing		
Labour hold		Swing		
Labour hold		Swing		

=== 2018 election ===
The election took place on 3 May 2018.

2018 Redbridge London Borough Council election: Seven Kings
Party	Candidate	Votes	%	±%
Labour	Harold Bellwood	2,630	77.58	N/A
Labour	Bob Littlewood	2,508	73.98	N/A
Labour	Sareena Sanger	2,441	72.01	N/A
Conservative	Mosheraf Ashraf	706	20.83	N/A
Conservative	Thor Halland	586	17.29	N/A
Conservative	Shirley Mensah	575	16.96	N/A
Turnout		3,390	35.00	
Labour win (new boundaries)				
Labour win (new boundaries)				
Labour win (new boundaries)				

== 2002–2018 Redbridge council elections ==
There was a revision of ward boundaries in Redbridge in 2002.

== 1978–2002 Redbridge council elections ==
=== 1998 election ===
The election took place on 7 May 1998.

=== 1996 by-election ===
The by-election took place on 28 November 1996, following the resignation of David Masters.

1996 Seven Kings by-election
Party	Candidate	Votes	%	±%
Labour	Robert Littlewood	1,498	61.8	
Conservative	Munawar Shah	822	33.9	
Liberal Democrats	Narendra Dattani	102	4.2	
Majority		676	28.1	
Turnout		2,422	30.7	
Labour hold		Swing		

=== 1994 election ===
The election took place on 5 May 1994.

=== 1990 election ===
The election took place on 3 May 1990.

=== 1986 election ===
The election took place on 8 May 1986.

=== 1982 election ===
The election took place on 6 May 1982.

=== 1980 by-election ===
The by-election took place on 1 May 1980, following the resignation of Leonard Norman.

1980 Seven Kings by-election
Party	Candidate	Votes	%	±%
Labour	David Jones	1,870		
Conservative	Robert Cole	1,390		
Independent	Joseph Green	184		
Liberal	James Hood	158		
National Front	Ian Newport	67		
Turnout				
Labour gain from Conservative		Swing		

=== 1978 by-election ===
The by-election took place on 7 December 1978, following the death of John MacLeod.

1978 Seven Kings by-election
Party	Candidate	Votes	%	±%
Conservative	Leonard Norman	1,308		
Labour	Alvin Perry	1,032		
Liberal	David Westlake	93		
Turnout				
Conservative hold		Swing		

== 1964–1978 Redbridge council elections ==
=== 1968 election ===
The election took place on 9 May 1968.

1968 Redbridge London Borough Council election: Seven Kings (4)
Party	Candidate	Votes	%	±%
Conservative	H. Aly	2,141		
Conservative	W. Glover	2,027		
Conservative	D. Odam	2,016		
Conservative	A. Leggatt	2,014		
Labour	H. Copsey	428		
Labour	T. Ridoutt	402		
Labour	N. Stringer	384		
Labour	B. Wallington	374		
Liberal	D. Ashcroft	340		
Liberal	S. Richards	327		
Liberal	A. Bigg	319		
Liberal	V. Mason	290		
Turnout				
Conservative hold		Swing		
Conservative hold		Swing		
Conservative hold		Swing		
Conservative hold		Swing		

=== 1964 election ===
The election took place on 7 May 1964.

1964 Redbridge London Borough Council election: Seven Kings (4)
Party	Candidate	Votes	%	±%
Conservative	H. Aly	1,657		
Conservative	H. Root	1,656		
Conservative	V. Ferrier	1,649		
Conservative	H. Cowan	1,642		
Labour	H. Copsey	983		
Labour	M. Powers	983		
Labour	F. Watts	973		
Labour	A. Osborne	961		
Liberal	L. Bowyer	544		
Liberal	D. Hellings	527		
Liberal	J. Stonham	514		
Liberal	E. Nater	498		
Turnout		3,169	29.9	
Conservative win (new seat)				
Conservative win (new seat)				
Conservative win (new seat)				
Conservative win (new seat)				
