= Snaresbrook (ward) =

Former electoral ward in the London Borough of Redbridge

- Former electoral ward for the Redbridge London Borough Council
- Snaresbrook ward boundaries from 2002 to 2018
- Borough: Redbridge
- County: Greater London
- Population: 11,868 (2011)
- Electorate: 9,477 (2014)
- Major settlements: Snaresbrook

Former electoral ward
- Created: 1965
- Abolished: 2018
- Councillors: 1965–1978: 4; 1978–2018: 3
- Replaced by: South Woodford , Wanstead Village
- ONS code: 00BCGS
- GSS code: E05000513

Snaresbrook was an electoral ward in the London Borough of Redbridge from 1965 to 2018. The ward was first used in the 1964 elections and last used for the 2014 elections. It returned councillors to Redbridge London Borough Council. It was subject to boundary revisions on 1978 and 2002. The 1978 revision reduced the number of councillors from four to three.

== 2002–2018 Redbridge council elections ==
=== 2014 election ===
The election took place on 22 May 2014.

2014 Redbridge London Borough Council election: Snaresbrook (3)
Party	Candidate	Votes	%	±%
Turnout				
	Conservative hold	Swing		
	Conservative hold	Swing		
	Conservative hold	Swing		

=== 2010 election ===
The election on 6 May 2010 took place on the same day as the United Kingdom general election.

2010 Redbridge London Borough Council election: Snaresbrook (3)
Party	Candidate	Votes	%	±%
Turnout				
	Conservative hold	Swing		
	Conservative hold	Swing		
	Conservative hold	Swing		

=== 2006 election ===
The election took place on 4 May 2006.

2006 Redbridge London Borough Council election: Snaresbrook (3)
Party	Candidate	Votes	%	±%
Conservative	Suzanne Nolan	1,843	43.4	
Conservative	Christopher Cummins	1,823		
Conservative	Peter Goody	1,764		
Labour	Gregor Eglin	1,223	28.8	
Labour	Jagdev Singh Purewal	1,123		
Labour	Rachel Voller	1,117		
Liberal Democrats	Alison Dreese	600	14.1	
Green	Louise Gunstock	584	13.7	
Liberal Democrats	Claire Hunt	476		
Liberal Democrats	John Swallow	454		
Turnout			43.9	
Conservative hold		Swing		
Conservative hold		Swing		
Conservative hold		Swing		

=== 2002 election ===
The election took place on 2 May 2002.

2002 Redbridge London Borough Council election: Snaresbrook (3)
Party	Candidate	Votes	%	±%
	Conservative win (new boundaries)			
	Conservative win (new boundaries)			
	Conservative win (new boundaries)			

== 1978–2002 Redbridge council elections ==
=== 1998 election ===
The election took place on 7 May 1998.

=== 1994 election ===
The election took place on 5 May 1994.

=== 1990 election ===
The election took place on 3 May 1990.

=== 1986 election ===
The election took place on 8 May 1986.

=== 1982 election ===
The election took place on 6 May 1982.

=== 1978 election ===
The election took place on 4 May 1978.

== 1964–1978 Redbridge council elections ==
=== 1975 by-election ===
The election took place on 19 November 1975.

1975 Snaresbrook by-election
Party	Candidate	Votes	%	±%
Conservative	Peter Goody	1,703		
Liberal	Richard Hoskins	984		
Labour	David Rose	310		
Turnout			29.0	
Conservative hold		Swing		

=== 1974 election ===
The election took place on 2 May 1974.

=== 1971 by-election ===
The by-election took place on 2 December 1971.

1971 Snaresbrook by-election
Party	Candidate	Votes	%	±%
Conservative	B. Tarring	1,609		
Labour	T. Desmond	660		
Liberal	M. Hoskins	433		
Turnout			24.6	
Conservative hold		Swing		

=== 1971 election ===
The election took place on 13 May 1971.

=== 1968 election ===
The election took place on 9 May 1968.

1964 Redbridge London Borough Council election: Snaresbrook (4)
Party	Candidate	Votes	%	±%
Conservative	J. Telford	3,082		
Conservative	R. Smith	3,059		
Conservative	W. Roberts	3,058		
Conservative	R. Open	2,932		
Liberal	H. Couch	504		
Liberal	W. Collins	489		
Liberal	C. Grindley	447		
Liberal	P. Netherclift	416		
Labour	P. Turner	302		
Labour	R. Barclay	292		
Labour	J. Morris	288		
Labour	A. Womersley	269		
Turnout				
Conservative hold		Swing		
Conservative hold		Swing		
Conservative hold		Swing		
Conservative hold		Swing		

=== 1964 election ===
The election took place on 7 May 1964.

1964 Redbridge London Borough Council election: Snaresbrook (4)
Party	Candidate	Votes	%	±%
Conservative	J. Telford	2,689		
Conservative	D. Mullett	2,688		
Conservative	W. Roberts	2,679		
Conservative	O. Hall	2,658		
Liberal	S. Honey	1,723		
Liberal	R. Baldwin	1,709		
Liberal	H. Couch	1,709		
Liberal	G. Brown	1,670		
Labour	L. Bourne	643		
Labour	G. Phillips	623		
Labour	E. Ingall	559		
Labour	J. Lewis	552		
Turnout		4,935	47.4	
Conservative win (new seat)				
Conservative win (new seat)				
Conservative win (new seat)				
Conservative win (new seat)				
