= Clayhall (ward) =

Electoral ward in Redbridge, London

- Electoral ward for the Redbridge London Borough Council
- Clayhall ward boundaries since 2018
- Borough: Redbridge
- County: Greater London
- Population: 14,420 (2021)
- Electorate: 9,986 (2022)
- Area: 2.492 square kilometres (0.962 sq mi)

Current electoral ward
- Created: 1965
- Number of members: 3
- Councillors: Prabjit Gurm; Kabir Mahmud; Jamal Uddin
- GSS code: E05000500 (2002–2018); E05011239 (since 2018)

Clayhall is an electoral ward in the London Borough of Redbridge. The ward has existed since the creation of the borough on 1 April 1965 and was first used in the 1964 elections. It returns three councillors to Redbridge London Borough Council.

== Redbridge council elections since 2018 ==
There was a revision of ward boundaries in Redbridge in 2018.

=== 2022 election ===
The election took place on 5 May 2022.

2022 Redbridge London Borough Council election: Clayhall
| Party | Candidate | Votes | % | ±% |
|---|---|---|---|---|
| Labour | Prabjit Gurm | 1,924 | 54.8 | ▲1.2 |
| Labour | Kabir Mahmud | 1,804 | 51.4 | ▼4.6 |
| Labour | Jamal Uddin | 1,780 | 50.7 | ▼0.8 |
| Conservative | Saravanan Muthusamy | 1,322 | 37.6 | ▼4.3 |
| Conservative | Dave Croft | 1,267 | 36.1 | ▼0.8 |
| Conservative | Muhammed Khan | 1,190 | 33.9 | ▼1.4 |
| Liberal Democrats | Kathleen Teahan | 383 | 10.9 | ▲6.7 |
| Turnout | | 3,513 | 35.2 | ▼15.4 |
| Labour hold | | Swing | | |
| Labour hold | | Swing | | |
| Labour hold | | Swing | | |

=== 2018 election ===
The election took place on 3 May 2018.

2018 Redbridge London Borough Council election: Clayhall
| Party | Candidate | Votes | % | ±% |
|---|---|---|---|---|
| Labour | Gurdial Bhamra | 2,700 | 55.95 | N/A |
| Labour | Sunita Bhamra | 2,588 | 53.63 | N/A |
| Labour | Mohammed Uddin | 2,485 | 51.49 | N/A |
| Conservative | Pranav Bhanot | 2,020 | 41.86 | N/A |
| Conservative | Robert Cole | 1,782 | 36.92 | N/A |
| Conservative | Alan Weinberg | 1,704 | 35.31 | N/A |
| Liberal Democrats | Ash Holder | 204 | 4.23 | N/A |
| Turnout | | 4,826 | 48.63 | |
| Labour win (new boundaries) | | | | |
| Labour win (new boundaries) | | | | |
| Labour win (new boundaries) | | | | |

== 2002–2018 Redbridge council elections ==
There was a revision of ward boundaries in Redbridge in 2002.

== 1978–2002 Redbridge council elections ==
=== 1998 election ===
The election took place on 7 May 1998.

=== 1994 election ===
The election took place on 5 May 1994.

=== 1990 election ===
The election took place on 3 May 1990.

=== 1986 election ===
The election took place on 8 May 1986.

=== 1982 election ===
The election took place on 6 May 1982.

=== 1978 election ===
The election took place on 4 May 1978.

== 1964–1978 Redbridge council elections ==
=== 1974 by-election ===
The by-election took place on 11 July 1974.

1974 Clayhall by-election
| Party | Candidate | Votes | % | ±% |
|---|---|---|---|---|
| Conservative | Regina Ashton | 1,590 | | |
| Liberal | Richard Hoskins | 968 | | |
| Labour | Philip Phillips | 414 | | |
| Turnout | | | 30.6 | |
| Conservative hold | | Swing | | |

=== 1974 election ===
The election took place on 2 May 1974.

=== 1971 election ===
The election took place on 13 May 1971.

=== 1968 election ===
The election took place on 9 May 1968.

1968 Redbridge London Borough Council election: Clayhall (3)
| Party | Candidate | Votes | % | ±% |
|---|---|---|---|---|
| Conservative | C. Loveless | 2,440 | | |
| Conservative | G. Chamberlin | 2,423 | | |
| Conservative | J. Norwood | 2,333 | | |
| Liberal | M. Lorek | 348 | | |
| Liberal | B. Rance | 320 | | |
| Labour | G. Phillips | 284 | | |
| Labour | W. Burgess | 266 | | |
| Labour | J. Stokes | 257 | | |
| Turnout | | | | |
| Conservative hold | | Swing | | |
| Conservative hold | | Swing | | |
| Conservative hold | | Swing | | |

=== 1964 election ===
The election took place on 7 May 1964.

1964 Redbridge London Borough Council election: Clayhall (3)
| Party | Candidate | Votes | % | ±% |
|---|---|---|---|---|
| Conservative | C. Loveless | 1,859 | | |
| Conservative | G. Chamberlin | 1,856 | | |
| Conservative | J. Norwood | 1,827 | | |
| Liberal | W. Bull | 794 | | |
| Liberal | T. Tunney | 787 | | |
| Liberal | M. Lorek | 775 | | |
| Labour | G. Hales | 451 | | |
| Labour | M. Pollard | 445 | | |
| Labour | V. Baldock | 438 | | |
| Turnout | | 3,072 | 32.4 | |
| Conservative win (new seat) | | | | |
| Conservative win (new seat) | | | | |
| Conservative win (new seat) | | | | |
