= 1998 Redbridge London Borough Council election =

1998 local election in England

← 1994	7 May 1998	2002 →

All 62 seats up for election to Redbridge London Borough Council 32 seats needed for a majority
- Registered: 173,873
- Turnout: 62,050, 35.69% (▼13.62)

	First party	Second party	Third party
Leader	Elizabeth A. Pearce	Unknown	Unknown
Party	Labour	Conservative	Liberal Democrats
Leader since	1994	Unknown	Unknown
Leader's seat	Seven Kings	Unknown	Unknown
Last election	29 seats, 39.41%	24 seats, 38.48%	9 seats, 21.75%
Seats won	30	23	9
Seat change	▲1	▼1	Steady
Popular vote	69,979	65,574	33,457
Percentage	41.21%	38.62%	19.71%
Swing	▲1.80	▲0.14	▼2.04
Council control before election
No Overall Control
Council control after election
No Overall Control

The 1998 Redbridge Council election took place on 7 May 1998 to elect members of Redbridge London Borough Council in London, England. The whole council was up for election and the council stayed in no overall control.

== Background ==
In between the 1994 election and this election there were a total of 5 by-election to replace councillor who either resigned from their seats or who died in office, however none of them resulted in seats changing parties. In addition to these by-elections there was a single seat that became vacant with too little time to hold a by-election, which meant the composition of the council just before the election was as follows:

↓
28	9	24	1
Labour	Lib Dem	Conservative	Vacant

== Election result ==
1998 Redbridge London Borough Council local elections
Party	Seats	Gains	Losses	Net gain/loss	Seats %	Votes %	Votes	+/−
Labour	30	3	2	▲1	48.39	41.21	69,979	▲1.80
Conservative	23	2	3	▼1	37.10	38.62	65,574	▲0.14
Liberal Democrats	9	0	0	Steady	14.51	19.71	33,457	▼2.04
Independent	0	0	0	Steady	0.00	0.25	429	▼0.01
Green	0	0	0	Steady	0.00	0.11	183	New
Socialist Labour	0	0	0	Steady	0.00	0.10	173	New
Total	62						169,795	

After the election the composition of the council was as follows:

↓
30	9	23
Labour	Lib Dem	Conservative

== Ward results ==
(*) - indicates an incumbent candidate

(†) - indicates an incumbent candidate standing in a different ward

=== Aldborough ===
Aldborough (3)
Party	Candidate	Votes	%	±%
Labour	John Coombes* (Note: Coombes was elected in a by-election triggered by the resignation of Cllr Raymond Ward in 1994)	1,453	55.48	▲8.95
Labour	Desmond Thurlby*	1,346		
Labour	Kenneth Turner*	1,285		
Conservative	Vanessa Cole	927	37.24	▼4.39
Conservative	William McIntyre	914		
Conservative	Faith Watts	900		
Liberal Democrats	John Barmby	196	7.28	▼4.56
Liberal Democrats	Michael Dommett	170		
Liberal Democrats	Elizabeth Yeoman	170		
Registered electors		6,720		▲79
Turnout		2,652	39.46	▼12.88
Rejected ballots		12	0.45	▲0.36
Labour hold				
Labour hold				
Labour hold				

=== Barkingside ===
Barkingside (3)
Party	Candidate	Votes	%	±%
Conservative	Keith Axon*	1,636	47.24	▲0.46
Conservative	Graham Borrott* (Note: Borrott was elected in a by-election triggered by the death of Cllr Thomas Cobb in 1996)	1,629		
Conservative	Roy Brunnen*	1,592		
Labour	Norman Hilton^{†} (Note: Hilton was a sitting councillor representing the Newbury ward)	1,548	43.91	▲7.00
Labour	Raj Chanan	1,494		
Labour	Edward Skelton	1,472		
Liberal Democrats	Valerie Taylor	306	8.85	▼7.46
Liberal Democrats	Anne Peterson	305		
Liberal Democrats	Albert Williamson	299		
Registered electors		9,828		▲366
Turnout		3,666	37.30	▼8.55
Rejected ballots		14	0.38	▲0.29
Conservative hold				
Conservative hold				
Conservative hold				

=== Bridge ===
Bridge (3)
Party	Candidate	Votes	%	±%
Conservative	Peter Lawrence*	1,463	45.34	▲3.23
Conservative	Claire Cooper	1,382		
Conservative	Morris Hickey*	1,360		
Labour	Barbara Cohen	1,241	37.94	▼3.25
Labour	Maureen Lambert	1,212		
Labour	Mohammed Sheikh	1,066		
Liberal Democrats	Colin Daren	357	11.13	▼5.57
Liberal Democrats	Madeline Sinclair	341		
Liberal Democrats	Nicolette Pashby	331		
Socialist Labour	Nicola Hoarau	173	5.59	New
Registered electors		9,389		▲1,010
Turnout		3,284	34.98	▼14.32
Rejected ballots		13	0.40	▲0.28
Conservative gain from Labour				
Conservative hold				
Conservative hold				

=== Chadwell ===
Chadwell (3)
Party	Candidate	Votes	%	±%
Liberal Democrats	Gary Staight*	2,304	62.65	▲15.
Liberal Democrats	John Tyne	2,050		
Liberal Democrats	Ralph Scott*	2,048		
Labour	Andrew Walker	746	18.27	▼4.64
Conservative	Beatrice Corfield	722	19.07	▼10.85
Conservative	Stewart Spivack	636		
Conservative	Maria Mbonye	591		
Labour	Ranjit Mudhar	561		
Labour	Bharat Pathak	560		
Registered electors		9,696		▲629
Turnout		3,704	38.20	▼16.91
Rejected ballots		7	0.19	▲0.11
Liberal Democrats hold				
Liberal Democrats hold				
Liberal Democrats hold				

=== Church End ===
Church End (3)
Party	Candidate	Votes	%	±%
Liberal Democrats	Richard Hoskins*	1,836	63.60	▲3.45
Liberal Democrats	Hugh Cleaver*	1,810		
Liberal Democrats	Maureen Hoskins*	1,763		
Conservative	Christopher MCummins	677	23.05	▼3.70
Conservative	Joy Debenham-Burton	673		
Conservative	John Steinberg	610		
Labour	David Pearce	412	13.35	▲0.25
Labour	John Ubsdell	370		
Labour	Saied Siddiqi	353		
Registered electors		7,978		▲487
Turnout		3,025	37.92	▼14.33
Rejected ballots		16	0.53	▲0.40
Liberal Democrats hold				
Liberal Democrats hold				
Liberal Democrats hold				

=== Clayhall ===
Clayhall (3)
Party	Candidate	Votes	%	±%
Conservative	Alan Weinberg*	1,639	54.69	▲0.74
Conservative	Ronald Barden*	1,612		
Conservative	John Lovell*	1,564		
Labour	Sylvia Crockford	1,111	35.97	▲3.19
Labour	Mary Tuffin	1,050		
Labour	Hafiz Majid	1,006		
Liberal Democrats	Barbara Robertson	311	9.34	▼3.93
Liberal Democrats	Alison McBrayne	261		
Liberal Democrats	Valmar Stevens	250		
Registered electors		10,059		▲504
Turnout		3,163	31.44	▼15.85
Rejected ballots		14	0.44	▲0.20
Conservative hold				
Conservative hold				
Conservative hold				

=== Clementswood ===
Clementswood (3)
Party	Candidate	Votes	%	±%
Labour	Falz Noor*	1,463	53.20	▼6.44
Labour	Simon Green*	1,438		
Labour	Peter Laugharne*	1,310		
Conservative	Surendra Patel	996	33.35	▲4.80
Conservative	Mohammed Inayat	888		
Conservative	Satish Gautum	756		
Liberal Democrats	John Collis	401	13.45	▲1.64
Liberal Democrats	Leslie Hutchines	334		
Liberal Democrats	Helen Glanfield	330		
Registered electors		8,638		▲772
Turnout		3,022	34.98	▼11.18
Rejected ballots		22	0.73	▲0.65
Labour hold				
Labour hold				
Labour hold				

=== Cranbrook ===
Cranbrook (3)
Party	Candidate	Votes	%	±%
Conservative	Charles Elliman*	1,521	47.58	▲4.97
Conservative	Glenn Corfield	1,421		
Conservative	Asaf Mirza*	1,421		
Labour	Michael Fitzmaurice	1,346	42.90	▲2.27
Labour	Munawar Hussain	1,316		
Labour	Gary Scottow	1,272		
Liberal Democrats	Saroj Sharma	304	9.52	▼7.94
Liberal Democrats	Stephen Simons	298		
Liberal Democrats	Rochelle Markovitch	271		
Registered electors		8,222		▲469
Turnout		3,362	40.89	▼15.40
Rejected ballots		19	0.57	▲0.46
Conservative hold				
Conservative hold				
Conservative hold				

=== Fairlop ===
Fairlop (3)
Party	Candidate	Votes	%	±%
Conservative	Joyce Ryan*	1,385	46.16	▲4.45
Labour	Royston Emmett^{†} (Note: Emmett was a sitting councillor representing the Loxford ward)	1,307	44.88	▲4.20
Conservative	Lee Scott	1,280		
Labour	Ronald Wyatt	1,270		
Conservative	Robert Cole	1,265		
Labour	Mary Lambert*	1,244		
Liberal Democrats	Graham Harvey	317	8.95	▼8.66
Liberal Democrats	Peter Briggs	226		
Liberal Democrats	Joan Moody	219		
Registered electors		8,292		▲31
Turnout		3,005	36.24	▼11.72
Rejected ballots		12	0.40	▲0.37
Conservative hold				
Labour hold				
Conservative gain from Labour				

=== Fullwell ===
Fullwell (3)
Party	Candidate	Votes	%	±%
Conservative	Harold Moth	1,358	51.51	▲1.67
Conservative	Laurence Davies	1,333		
Conservative	Alan Hughes*	1,320		
Labour	Jeffrey Fox	889	30.59	▼4.12
Labour	Joseph Hoedemaker	809		
Labour	Kamal Qureshi	684		
Liberal Democrats	Janice Cudmore	489	17.90	▲2.45
Liberal Democrats	Andrew Martin	460		
Liberal Democrats	Dominic Black	445		
Registered electors		8,666		▲134
Turnout		2,836	32.73	▼10.93
Rejected ballots		19	0.67	▲0.59
Conservative hold				
Conservative hold				
Conservative hold				

=== Goodmayes ===
Goodmayes (2)
Party	Candidate	Votes	%	±%
Labour	Sidney Middleburgh*	643	52.38	▲6.29
Labour	David Radford	588		
Conservative	Keith Langford^{†} (Note: Lanford was a sitting councillor representing the Cranbrook ward)	369	29.49	▼5.25
Conservative	Shahlab Baig	324		
Liberal Democrats	Frank Marsh	233	18.13	▲7.11
Liberal Democrats	Narendra Dattani	193		
Registered electors		3,949		▲491
Turnout		1,284	32.51	▼20.93
Rejected ballots		13	1.01	▲0.90
Labour hold				
Labour hold				

=== Hainault ===
Hainault (3)
Party	Candidate	Votes	%	±%
Labour	John Fairley-Churchill*	1,070	59.62	▲2.20
Labour	Richard Newcombe* (Note: Newcombe was elected in a by-election triggered by the resignation of Cllr Linda Perham in 1997)	1,056		
Labour	Edmund Peake*	1,039		
Conservative	Sheila Moth	530	29.33	▲1.24
Conservative	Sonia Macdonald	525		
Conservative	Barbara Wilson	502		
Liberal Democrats	Kathleen Black	221	11.06	▼3.42
Liberal Democrats	Robert Wright	192		
Liberal Democrats	Peter Prager	174		
Registered electors		7,003		▼12
Turnout		1,892	27.02	▼18.64
Rejected ballots		8	0.42	▲0.30
Labour hold				
Labour hold				
Labour hold				

=== Loxford ===
Loxford (3)
Party	Candidate	Votes	%	±%
Labour	Muhammed Javed*	1,655	53.97	▼15.34
Labour	Sharon Speller	1,417		
Labour	Faredoon Maravala*	1,296		
Conservative	Mohammed Zamir	832	24.02	▲4.66
Conservative	Pakizah Baig	627		
Conservative	Alexei Hindoian	485		
Independent	Sayeed Akhtar	329	12.19	New
Liberal Democrats	Peter Clack	309	9.82	▼1.51
Liberal Democrats	Leslie Everest	270		
Liberal Democrats	Jitendra Sahgal	216		
Registered electors		9,565		▲1,383
Turnout		2,896	30.28	▼14.37
Rejected ballots		33	1.14	▲0.87
Labour hold				
Labour hold				
Labour hold				

=== Mayfield ===
Mayfield (3)
Party	Candidate	Votes	%	±%
Labour	Lesley Hilton*	1,567	54.44	▲3.93
Labour	Reginald Golding^{†} (Note: Golding was a sitting councillor representing the Goodmayes ward)	1,547		
Labour	Ayodhiya Parkash	1,528		
Conservative	David Clarke	1,225	36.85	▲2.11
Conservative	Arthur Leggatt	1,011		
Conservative	Mohammed Shaikh	906		
Liberal Democrats	Eric Papworth	314	8.71	▼6.04
Liberal Democrats	Edwin Potkins	216		
Liberal Democrats	Richard Torney	213		
Registered electors		9,271		▲739
Turnout		3,203	34.55	▼15.60
Rejected ballots		12	0.37	▲0.21
Labour hold				
Labour hold				
Labour hold				

=== Monkhams ===
Monkhams (3)
Party	Candidate	Votes	%	±%
Conservative	Linda	1,795	62.26	▲1.08
Conservative	Michael Stark*	1,795		
Conservative	James O'Shea	1,789		
Liberal Democrats	Michael McElarney	626	20.43	▼2.54
Liberal Democrats	Geoffrey Seeff	589		
Liberal Democrats	Percy Lomax	550		
Labour	Daniel Douglas	519	17.31	▲1.46
Labour	Nicholas Hayes	514		
Labour	Georgina Lynch	463		
Registered electors		8,213		▲563
Turnout		3,035	36.95	▼9.95
Rejected ballots		11	0.36	▲0.14
Conservative hold				
Conservative hold				
Conservative hold				

=== Newbury ===
Newbury (3)
Party	Candidate	Votes	%	±%
Labour	Gayle Evans	1,744	62.95	▲10.67
Labour	Greer Nicholson* (Note: Nicolson was elected in a by-election triggered by the death of Cllr Brian Myers in 1996)	1,704		
Labour	Dev Sharma*	1,688		
Conservative	Darshan Sharma	746	26.29	▼10.71
Conservative	Mohammad Bashir	713		
Conservative	Shatrugham Parmar	686		
Liberal Democrats	Amelia Olive	377	10.76	▲0.04
Liberal Democrats	Walter Staight	276		
Liberal Democrats	Deanna Seef	225		
Registered electors		8,518		▲535
Turnout		3,032	35.60	▼17.38
Rejected ballots		37	1.22	▲0.98
Labour hold				
Labour hold				
Labour hold				

=== Roding ===
Roding (3)
Party	Candidate	Votes	%	±%
Liberal Democrats	Ian Bond*	1,776	51.70	▼4.78
Liberal Democrats	Felicity Banks	1,721		
Liberal Democrats	Anthony Boyland	1,664		
Conservative	Anthony Loffhagen	964	28.05	▼2.28
Conservative	Paul Chapman	951		
Conservative	Fatema Hussain	885		
Labour	Henry Garratt	582	17.24	▲4.68
Labour	John Cullen	574		
Labour	Martin Chew	565		
Independent	Martin Levin	100	3.01	New
Registered electors		8,682		▲572
Turnout		3,444	39.67	▼13.67
Rejected ballots		10	0.29	▲0.04
Liberal Democrats hold				
Liberal Democrats hold				
Liberal Democrats hold				

=== Seven Kings ===
Seven Kings (3)
Party	Candidate	Votes	%	±%
Labour	Elizabeth Pearce*	1,343	52.77	▼3.23
Labour	Maganbhai Patel*	1,317		
Labour	Robert Littlewood* (Note: Littlewood was elected in a by-election triggered by the resignation of Cllr David Masters in 1996)	1,245		
Conservative	Rajinder Athwal	969	36.76	▲5.12
Conservative	Ashok Kumar	908		
Conservative	Beryl Waghorn	843		
Liberal Democrats	Ian Ward	314	10.47	▼1.89
Liberal Democrats	Francis Macdonald	276		
Liberal Democrats	Dawood Dhooma	185		
Registered electors		7,838		▲239
Turnout		2,762	35.24	▼9.15
Rejected ballots		18	0.65	▲0.41
Labour hold				
Labour hold				
Labour hold				

=== Snaresbrook ===
Snaresbrook (3)
Party	Candidate	Votes	%	±%
Labour	Gregor Eglin	1,492	44.71	▲3.02
Conservative	Peter Goody*	1,411	44.37	▼0.69
Conservative	Suzanne Nolan	1,366		
Labour	Lucille Manning	1,354		
Conservative	Anthony Lenaghan	1,335		
Labour	Samuel Morgan	1,298		
Liberal Democrats	William Madge	353	10.92	▼2.33
Liberal Democrats	Ralph Stevens	337		
Liberal Democrats	John Swallow	322		
Registered electors		7,928		▲640
Turnout		3,248	40.97	▼10.39
Rejected ballots		4	0.12	▲0.09
Labour gain from Conservative				
Conservative hold				
Conservative hold				

=== Valentines ===
Valentines (3)
Party	Candidate	Votes	%	±%
Labour	John Brindley*	1,198	51.52	▲10.69
Labour	Elaine Norman*	1,071		
Labour	Virendra Tewari*	1,011		
Conservative	Stephanie Burtt	629	27.47	▼0.91
Conservative	Shaheen Yasin	576		
Conservative	Tarlochan Sian	544		
Liberal Democrats	George Hogarth	321	12.39	▼1.45
Liberal Democrats	Allan Wright	236		
Liberal Democrats	Susan Hamlyn	232		
Green	Brian Curtis	183	8.62	New
Registered electors		7,560		▲596
Turnout		2,197	29.06	▼19.83
Rejected ballots		10	0.46	▲0.34
Labour hold				
Labour hold				
Labour hold				

=== Wanstead ===
Wanstead (3)
Party	Candidate	Votes	%	±%
Labour	Gordon George	1,461	45.08	▲9.19
Labour	Jeffery Edelman	1,450		
Conservative	Allan Burgess*	1,413	40.90	▼1.33
Labour	Allan Tuffin	1,346		
Conservative	Thomas Howl*	1,232		
Conservative	Michael Borrott*	1,217		
Liberal Democrats	Janet Cornish	536	14.02	▼7.86
Liberal Democrats	Pamela Winborne	419		
Liberal Democrats	James Swallow	369		
Registered electors		7,858		▲269
Turnout		3,338	42.48	▼8.44
Rejected ballots		10	0.30	▼0.11
Labour gain from Conservative				
Labour gain from Conservative				
Conservative hold				
