= 2026 Redbridge London Borough Council election =

2026 local election in Redbridge

- 7 May 2026

All 63 seats to Redbridge London Borough Council 32 seats needed for a majority
- Registered: 217,916
- Turnout: 90,217 (41.4%)
	First party	Second party	Third party
Leader	Kam Rai	Paul Canal	Vaseem Ahmed
Party	Labour	Conservative	Redbridge Ind.
Last election	58 seats, 58.4%	5 seats, 32.7%	Did not exist
Seats before	54	5	1
Seats won	43	5	9
Seats after	43	5	9
Seat change	▼11	0	▲8
Popular vote	80,963	42,889	37,402
Percentage	32.4%	17.2%	15.0%
	Fourth party	Fifth party	Sixth party
Party	Green	Reform	Independent
Last election	0 seats	Did not stand	Did not stand
Seats before	0	0	3
Seats won	5	1	0
Seats after	5	1	0
Seat change	▲5	▲1	▼3
Popular vote	36,497	33,057	10,933
Percentage	14.6%	13.2%	4.4%
- Map of the results of the 2026 Redbridge London Borough council election. Labour in red, Green in green, Conservatives in blue, Reform in light blue and Redbridge Independents in grey. Striped wards have mixed representation.
Leader before election
Kam Rai
Labour
Leader after election
Kam Rai
Labour

The 2026 Redbridge London Borough Council election took place on 7 May 2026. All 63 members of Redbridge London Borough Council were to be elected. The elections took place alongside local elections in the other London boroughs and elections to local authorities across the United Kingdom.

The council was under Labour majority control prior to the election. Labour lost a number of seats at this election, but retained 43 of the council's 63 seats and so kept their overall majority.

== Background ==
Redbridge Council has historically swung between Conservative Party control and periods of no overall control, until the Labour Party won its first majority in 2014.

== Previous council composition ==
After 2022 election		Before 2026 election		After 2026 election	
Party	Seats	Party	Seats	Party	Seats
Labour	58	Labour	53	Labour	43
Conservative	5	Conservative	5	Redbridge Ind.	9
		Independent	2	Conservative	5
		Vacant	2	Green	5
		Redbridge Ind.	1	Reform	1

Changes 2022–2026:

- November 2022: Kabir Mahmud (Labour) leaves party to sit as an independent
- February 2024: Shanelle Johnson (Labour) leaves party to sit as an independent
- June 2024: Rosa Gomez (Labour) leaves party to sit as an independent
- October 2024: Bayo Alaba (Labour) resigns – by-election held November 2024
- November 2024: Emma Shepherd-Mallinson (Labour) wins by-election
- February 2025: Jas Athwal (Labour) resigns – by-election held March 2025
- March 2025:
  - Noor Begum (Ilford Independents) gains by-election from Labour
  - Sam Gould (Labour) suspended from party and resigns – by-election held May 2025
- May 2025: Helen Mullis (Labour) wins by-election
- March 2026: Rosa Gomez (Independent) disqualified for non-attendance – seat left vacant until 2026 election
- April 2026: Hannah Chaudhry (Labour) resigns – seat left vacant until 2026 election

== Election results ==
Council composition after the 2022 election

Council composition after the 2026 election

2026 Redbridge London Borough Council election
Party	Candidates	Seats	Gains	Losses	Net gain/loss	Seats %	Votes %	Votes	+/−
Labour	63	43	3	18	▼15	68.25	32.45	80,963	▼26.15
Redbridge Ind.	42	9	9	0	▲9	14.28	15.42	38,462	NEW
Conservative	63	5	2	2	Steady	7.94	17.19	42,889	▼15.51
Green	46	5	5	0	▲5	7.94	14.63	36,497	▲12.23
Reform	56	1	1	0	▲1	1.59	13.25	33,057	▲13.15
Liberal Democrats	30	0	-	-	Steady	-	3.11	7,767	▼1.79
Independent	9	0	-	-	Steady	-	2.20	5,501	N/A
Redbridge Matters	9	0	-	-	Steady	-	1.44	3,588	NEW
Redbridge Trade Union Party	1	0	-	-	Steady	-	0.31	784	NEW

== Ward results ==
=== Aldborough ===
Aldborough (3)
Party	Candidate	Votes	%	±%
Labour	Kam Rai*	1,874	40.8	−17.2
Labour	Jyotsna Islam*	1,729	37.6	−14.2
Labour	Lebo Phakoe*	1,646	35.8	−11.6
Conservative	Rahul Mahajan	809	17.6	−19.6
Green	Sara Kassam	790	17.2	N/A
Conservative	Ian Caswell	751	16.3	−18.7
Conservative	Savita Sharma	732	15.9	−17.6
Green	Alison Wood	715	15.6	N/A
Redbridge Ind.	Zahrah Awaleh	631	13.7	N/A
Reform	Dhenesh Ramanathan	564	12.3	N/A
Reform	Alison Jay	562	12.2	N/A
Reform	Shahana Mashrur	458	10.0	N/A
Independent	Naresh Macherla	432	9.4	N/A
Redbridge Ind.	Joshua Bridgeman-Carty	393	8.5	N/A
Redbridge Ind.	Janum Janum	362	7.9	N/A
Independent	Omer Sohail	259	5.6	N/A
Liberal Democrats	Rosemary Thomas	160	3.5	−4.0
Liberal Democrats	Gwyneth Deakins	154	3.4	N/A
Liberal Democrats	Andrew Eracleous	138	3.0	N/A
Turnout		4597	43.18	+8.88
Labour hold		Swing		
Labour hold		Swing		
Labour hold		Swing		

=== Barkingside ===
Barkingside (3)
Party	Candidate	Votes	%	±%
Labour	Harminder Bal	1785	35.5	−14.5
Labour	Martin Sachs*	1649	32.8	−12.5
Labour	Syeda Pasha	1630	32.4	−11.2
Redbridge Ind.	Vaseem Ahmed	1472	29.3	N/A
Redbridge Ind.	Samine Aseeb	1382	27.5	N/A
Redbridge Ind.	Ria Bhatti	1328	26.4	N/A
Conservative	Vinod Agrawal	1145	22.8	−17.5
Conservative	Saravanan Muthusamy	1003	20.0	−18.8
Conservative	Ihsan Khan	716	14.2	−23.5
Reform	Steven Batey	680	13.5	N/A
Reform	Vishwanath Kokkonda	674	13.4	N/A
Reform	W Thomas Thambipillai	603	12.0	N/A
Liberal Democrats	John Clare	313	6.2	−3.3
Turnout		5025	45.16	+7.76
Labour hold		Swing		
Labour hold		Swing		
Labour hold		Swing		

=== Bridge ===
Bridge (3)
Party	Candidate	Votes	%	±%
Conservative	Stephen Adams	1475	33.6	−0.3
Conservative	Adam Joiner	1302	29.6	−2.1
Conservative	Josiah Moseley	1182	26.9	−3.8
Reform	Stuart Shulton	1068	24.3	+17.4
Reform	Thomas Jose	1053	24.0	N/A
Green	Rachel Collinson	951	21.7	+7.6
Labour	Misba Ahmed	942	21.4	−15.4
Labour	Gurdial Bhamra*	941	21.4	−15.0
Labour	Jesmin Chowdhury	937	21.3	−12.4
Reform	Rakesh Vasis	915	20.8	N/A
Green	Richard Andrews	861	19.6	N/A
Green	Joe McIntosh	805	18.3	N/A
Liberal Democrats	Dilip Padipurakalathi	191	4.3	−4.6
Turnout		4392	45.5	+10
Conservative gain from Labour		Swing		
Conservative gain from Labour		Swing		
Conservative hold		Swing		

=== Chadwell ===
Chadwell (3)
Party	Candidate	Votes	%	±%
Labour	Bert Jones*	1171	26.8	▼35.4
Redbridge Ind.	Muhammad Afzal	1060	24.2	N/A
Green	Niamh Atkins	946	21.6	▲4.4
Labour	Luthfa Rahman*	916	20.9	▼37.2
Labour	Muhammad Layek	900	20.6	▼36.9
Redbridge Ind.	Arakoth Chowdhury	885	20.2	N/A
Green	Prince Nwankwo	800	18.3	N/A
Green	Syed Siddiqi	792	18.1	N/A
Redbridge Ind.	Aba Kristilolu	729	16.7	N/A
Conservative	Sanjay Vijh	723	16.5	▼10.8
Conservative	Shirley Baah-Mensah	601	13.7	▼12.4
Reform	Maximillian Phoenix	586	13.4	N/A
Reform	Waz Akram	546	12.5	N/A
Conservative	Monis Khan	486	11.1	▼12.8
Liberal Democrats	Gary Staight	369	8.4	N/A
Redbridge Matters	Shamima Aktar	301	6.9	N/A
Redbridge Matters	Ahmed Maruf	267	6.1	N/A
Liberal Democrats	Sagal Osman	135	3.1	N/A
Turnout		4376	38.81	▲10.01
Labour hold		Swing		
Redbridge Ind. gain from Labour		Swing		
Green gain from Labour		Swing		

=== Churchfields ===
Churchfields (3) (Note: The Green Party are standing down in this ward in support of the Chingford and Woodford Green Community Independents.)
Party	Candidate	Votes	%	±%
Labour	Lloyd Duddridge*	1808	34.4	−10.2
Labour	Judith Garfield*	1664	31.7	−10.7
Labour	Guy Williams*	1597	30.4	−6.1
Independent	Jillian Ghose	1143	21.8	N/A
Independent	Helen Watson	1141	21.7	N/A
Independent	Rita Mahli	1086	20.7	N/A
Conservative	Chrissie Gorman	1072	20.4	−14.1
Reform	Nicola Cuthbert	1004	19.1	N/A
Reform	John Long	939	17.9	N/A
Conservative	Zohair Hassan	938	17.8	−14.4
Reform	Alex Wilson	908	17.3	N/A
Conservative	Samantha Quaresma-Cabral	905	17.2	−13.3
Liberal Democrats	Heather Liddle	426	8.1	−8.9
Liberal Democrats	Martin Rosner	379	7.2	−8.9
Liberal Democrats	Michael Teahan	304	5.8	−8.2
Turnout		5255	48.78	+3.08
Labour hold		Swing		
Labour hold		Swing		
Labour hold		Swing		

Jillian Ghose, Rita Mahli and Helen Watson are affiliated with the Chingford and Woodford Green Community Independents, associated with Faiza Shaheen.

=== Clayhall ===
Clayhall (3)
Party	Candidate	Votes	%	±%
Labour	Kalpana Bose	1529	34.0	−20.8
Labour	Jamal Uddin*	1359	30.3	−21.1
Labour	Kamal Qureshi	1284	28.6	−22.1
Conservative	Vinil Gupta	923	20.6	−17.0
Green	Lily Boon	864	19.2	N/A
Redbridge Ind.	Azizur Rahman	850	18.9	N/A
Redbridge Ind.	Krishen Bhardwaj	807	18.0	N/A
Conservative	Karen Packer	743	16.5	−19.6
Redbridge Ind.	Ashburn Holder	686	15.3	N/A
Redbridge Matters	Kabir Mahmud*	596	13.3	N/A
Conservative	Obaidul Khan	573	12.8	−21.1
Redbridge Matters	Mohammed Shahid	465	10.4	N/A
Reform	John Brodie	457	10.2	N/A
Reform	Miki Dutta	429	9.6	N/A
Reform	Richard Heins	396	8.8	N/A
Liberal Democrats	Joel Winston	155	3.5	−7.4
Liberal Democrats	Kathleen Teahan	153	3.4	N/A
Liberal Democrats	Natascia Servini	140	3.1	N/A
Turnout		4491	44.0	+8.8
Labour hold		Swing		
Labour hold		Swing		
Labour hold		Swing		

=== Clementswood ===
Clementswood (3)
Party	Candidate	Votes	%	±%
Labour	Muhammed Javed*	1065	41.2	−39.2
Labour	Zulfiqar Hussain*	1037	40.1	−37.9
Redbridge Ind.	Fazlul Haque	915	35.4	N/A
Labour	Taifur Rashid*	884	34.2	−43.2
Redbridge Ind.	Abdurahman Jafar	787	30.4	N/A
Redbridge Ind.	Muhammad Mughal	719	27.8	N/A
Green	Zain Ali	640	24.8	N/A
Green	Saheena Saeed	531	20.5	N/A
Conservative	Deepika Verma	527	20.4	+4.2
Conservative	Ritu Chaubey	522	20.2	+6.0
Conservative	Sarika Dube	510	19.7	+5.9
Green	Tanaka Pinki	475	18.4	N/A
Redbridge Matters	Farjana Afroja	435	16.8	N/A
Reform	Peter Roovers	219	8.5	N/A
Liberal Democrats	Finlay Collins	148	5.7	N/A
Turnout		2585	27.0	−0.7
Labour hold		Swing		
Labour hold		Swing		
Redbridge Ind. gain from Labour		Swing		

=== Cranbrook ===
Cranbrook (3)
Party	Candidate	Votes	%	±%
Redbridge Ind.	Feza Haque	1200	31.6	N/A
Labour	Chaudhary Ahmed	1143	30.1	−33.3
Redbridge Ind.	Mohamed Haleemdeen	1088	28.6	N/A
Labour	Saira Jamil*	935	24.6	−34.9
Redbridge Ind.	Tahreem Noor	911	24.0	N/A
Labour	Syed Islam*	898	23.6	−33.6
Independent	Mohammed Asif	718	18.9	N/A
Green	Vissen Limbeea	651	17.1	N/A
Conservative	Rambabu Siripurapu	626	16.5	−12.9
Conservative	Chiranjeev Verma	619	16.3	−12.5
Conservative	Nicole Maccari	610	16.1	−12.3
Independent	Surinder Pahl	280	7.4	N/A
Reform	Steven Kraft	273	7.2	N/A
Reform	Patricia Steel	264	6.9	N/A
Liberal Democrats	Grace Jacob	239	6.3	N/A
Turnout		3800	38.52	+9.12
Redbridge Ind. gain from Labour		Swing		
Labour hold		Swing		
Redbridge Ind. gain from Labour		Swing		

=== Fairlop ===
Fairlop (3)
Party	Candidate	Votes	%	±%
Labour	Bob Chattaway*	1387	32.4	−14.0
Labour	Erza Doda	1260	29.4	−13.6
Labour	Yogesh Saini	1236	28.8	−10.7
Reform	Richard King	1082	25.2	N/A
Reform	Madhuri Bandaru	1058	24.7	N/A
Reform	Philip Smith	1050	24.5	N/A
Conservative	Joyce Ryan*	1034	24.1	−23.5
Conservative	Richard Firmstone	967	22.6	−24.1
Conservative	Sayeed Syduzzaman	788	18.4	−27.8
Green	Razwana Hafiz	772	18.0	N/A
Green	Cedric Knight	670	15.6	N/A
Liberal Democrats	Catherine Davies	263	6.1	−3.4
Liberal Democrats	Gavin Bowtell	198	4.6	N/A
Liberal Democrats	Mark Vince	181	4.2	N/A
Turnout		4286	42.0	+7.5
Labour gain from Conservative		Swing		
Labour gain from Conservative		Swing		
Labour hold		Swing		

=== Fullwell ===
Fullwell (3)
Party	Candidate	Votes	%	±%
Labour	Matthew Goddin*	1868	38.2	−19.0
Labour	Vibhu Taneja	1773	36.3	−18.4
Labour	Linda Mullis	1771	36.2	−15.5
Reform	James Anderson	946	19.4	N/A
Green	Lee Burkwood	901	18.4	N/A
Reform	Laura Elliott	885	18.1	N/A
Reform	Amanda Swords	838	17.2	N/A
Green	Fahad Zeeshan	795	16.3	N/A
Green	Amir Sandhu	777	15.9	N/A
Conservative	Gowri Adimulam	746	15.3	−24.9
Conservative	Vrindha Vaishnav	717	14.7	−22.4
Conservative	Arpan Mahajan	662	13.5	−22.5
Redbridge Ind.	Imran Arshad	490	10.0	N/A
Redbridge Ind.	Sara Nazir	485	9.9	N/A
Redbridge Ind.	Ghazala Muhammad	473	9.7	N/A
Turnout		4886	42.33	+9.43
Labour hold		Swing		
Labour hold		Swing		
Labour hold		Swing		

=== Goodmayes ===
Goodmayes (3)
Party	Candidate	Votes	%	±%
Labour	Ben Cornish	1140	31.1	−39.5
Labour	Shorif Akhonda	1120	30.6	−38.5
Labour	Prabjit Gurm*	1098	30.0	−34.7
Redbridge Ind.	Amina Azmath	951	26.0	N/A
Redbridge Ind.	Humera Yasin	895	24.4	N/A
Redbridge Ind.	Shorful Islam	891	24.3	N/A
Green	Helen Choudhury	677	18.5	N/A
Green	Amjad Iqbal	632	17.3	N/A
Green	John Tyne	593	16.2	N/A
Conservative	Maureen Ashley	519	14.2	−8.1
Conservative	Robin Thakur	515	14.1	−7.6
Reform	Spencer Rose	382	10.4	N/A
Reform	Hannah Chapman	379	10.3	N/A
Conservative	Mohammed Chowdhury	359	9.8	−9.0
Reform	Chacko Bibin	309	8.4	N/A
Turnout		3662	34.57	+9.47
Labour hold		Swing		
Labour hold		Swing		
Labour hold		Swing		

=== Hainault ===
Hainault (3)
Party	Candidate	Votes	%	±%
Labour	Helen Mullis*	1573	37.1	−13.6
Labour	Shah Ali*	1523	35.9	−11.0
Reform	Neil Anderson	1378	32.5	N/A
Labour	Pushpita Gupta*	1368	32.3	−13.0
Reform	Sylvester Lewis	1311	30.9	N/A
Reform	Sunil Bali	1234	29.1	N/A
Green	Cat Still	846	20.0	N/A
Redbridge Ind.	Rana Ahmad	613	14.5	N/A
Conservative	Kamaldeep Singh	516	12.2	−31.2
Conservative	Pamkaj Baldev	492	11.6	−31.2
Conservative	Prabhu Vasudevan	487	11.5	−30.1
Liberal Democrats	Piotr Berndt	261	6.2	N/A
Turnout		4239	38.93	+6.03
Labour hold		Swing		
Labour hold		Swing		
Reform gain from Labour		Swing		

=== Ilford Town ===
Ilford Town (2)
Party	Candidate	Votes	%	±%
Labour	Saima Ahmed*	910	33.4	−39.8
Redbridge Ind.	Mohammed Enamul	905	33.2	N/A
Redbridge Ind.	Firoz Patel	806	29.6	N/A
Labour	Shoaib Patel*	744	27.3	−42.6
Green	Syed Siddiqi	462	17.0	N/A
Conservative	Zahirul Mirdha	428	15.7	−7.2
Reform	Naresh Maharaj	302	11.1	N/A
Reform	Roger Fallows	257	9.4	N/A
Conservative	Isaac Odejimi	250	9.2	−11.7
Liberal Democrats	Mohammed Khan	113	4.1	N/A
Turnout		2723	34.47	+7.77
Labour hold		Swing		
Redbridge Ind. gain from Labour		Swing		

=== Loxford ===
Loxford (3)
Party	Candidate	Votes	%	±%
Labour	Foyzur Rahman*	1173	36.9	−40.8
Labour	Sahdia Warraich*	1020	32.0	−41.3
Labour	Mazhar Saleem	997	31.3	−41.4
Green	Nisa Firdaus	884	27.8	N/A
Green	Kashif Naqvi	713	22.4	N/A
Green	Mohsin Toga	683	21.5	N/A
Redbridge Ind.	Ruthba Amin	558	17.5	N/A
Redbridge Ind.	Iqbal Ahmed	500	15.7	N/A
Conservative	Poonam Gaur	366	11.5	−6.6
Redbridge Ind.	Ramona Mitrache	364	11.4	N/A
Redbridge Matters	Muhammad Afzal	299	9.4	N/A
Independent	Jaffry Jaman	278	8.7	N/A
Redbridge Matters	Ataur Rahman	258	8.1	N/A
Conservative	Aleska Hossain	248	7.8	−7.7
Reform	Michael Noel	241	7.6	N/A
Conservative	Razaul Karim	221	6.9	−7.9
Reform	Tad Jani	215	6.8	N/A
Turnout		3183	30.97	+4.77
Labour hold		Swing		
Labour hold		Swing		
Labour hold		Swing		

=== Mayfield ===
Mayfield (3)
Party	Candidate	Votes	%	±%
Labour	Harneek Kaur	1306	33.2	−42.9
Labour	Rishi Bhagi	1291	32.8	−36.8
Redbridge Ind.	Noor Begum*	1286	32.7	N/A
Labour	Tanweer Khan*	1279	32.5	−36.4
Redbridge Ind.	Bilal Muhammad	1064	27.1	N/A
Redbridge Ind.	Edreis Rizwan	920	23.4	N/A
Green	Ijaz Amjad	725	18.4	N/A
Green	Imran Awan	686	17.5	N/A
Green	Eva Takacs	531	13.5	N/A
Conservative	Matthew Cole	442	11.2	−5.8
Reform	Sharad Desai	380	9.7	N/A
Conservative	Russel Dias	367	9.3	−5.9
Reform	Joanne Hennessey	355	9.0	N/A
Conservative	Azmain Tazwar	348	8.9	−2.8
Reform	Carl Odell	324	8.2	N/A
Turnout		3931	37.09	+6.79
Labour gain from Redbridge Ind.		Swing		
Labour hold		Swing		
Redbridge Ind. gain from Labour		Swing		

=== Monkhams ===
Monkhams (2)
Party	Candidate	Votes	%	±%
Conservative	Joel Herga*	2055	53.4	−4.2
Conservative	Clark Vasey	1972	51.2	−5.2
Reform	Gerald Bouchier	568	14.7	N/A
Labour	Romana Kousar	545	14.2	−17.4
Green	Timothy Harris	518	13.5	N/A
Green	Jordan Meakin	477	12.4	N/A
Labour	Ghandhimathy Sooriyakumar	474	12.3	−15.7
Reform	Savan Vyas	455	11.8	N/A
Liberal Democrats	Claire Hunt	260	6.8	−5.7
Liberal Democrats	Chris Portou	187	4.9	−3.4
Turnout		3851	52.52	+11.82
Conservative hold		Swing		
Conservative hold		Swing		

=== Newbury ===
Newbury (3)
Party	Candidate	Votes	%	±%
Labour	Sunny Brar*	1683	40.2	−24.3
Labour	Thavathuray Jeyaranjan*	1586	37.9	−25.2
Labour	Syeda Choudhury*	1583	37.8	−25.0
Redbridge Ind.	Tanvir Ahmed	1215	29.0	N/A
Redbridge Ind.	Aslam Iqbal	1077	25.7	N/A
Redbridge Ind.	Winslow Green	1027	24.5	N/A
Green	Chloe Juliette	694	16.6	N/A
Green	Maulik Patel	605	14.4	N/A
Green	Samia Nneji	526	12.6	N/A
Conservative	Olakunle Olaifa	444	10.6	−15.1
Reform	Stanley Segor	370	8.8	N/A
Conservative	Ibtasum Iktador	367	8.8	−16.3
Conservative	Moazzam Sultan	347	8.3	−16.2
Reform	Strungaru Vitalie	341	8.1	N/A
Turnout		4190	42.3	+11.1
Labour hold		Swing		
Labour hold		Swing		
Labour hold		Swing		

=== Seven Kings ===
Seven Kings (3)
Party	Candidate	Votes	%	±%
Redbridge Ind.	Imran Ahmed	1322	32.5	N/A
Labour	Vanisha Solanki*	1156	28.4	−34.4
Labour	Nav Johal*	1066	26.2	−36.6
Redbridge Ind.	Rayhana Yasmin	1049	25.8	N/A
Labour	Sadiq Kothia*	1031	25.3	−33.9
Redbridge Ind.	Kes Choudhery	938	23.0	N/A
Redbridge Trade Union Party	Andy Walker	784	19.3	−1.6
Green	Awab Bahri	627	15.4	N/A
Green	Tony Csoka	566	13.9	N/A
Conservative	Dak Patel	519	12.7	−6.3
Redbridge Matters	Mohammed Noor	500	12.3	N/A
Redbridge Matters	Abdur Rashid	467	11.5	N/A
Reform	Thomas Kempster	355	8.7	N/A
Reform	Chiara Castelli	336	8.3	N/A
Conservative	Usman Rasheed	272	6.7	−10.6
Conservative	Mir Ali	232	5.7	−9.8
Turnout		4072	39.36	+11.86
Redbridge Ind. gain from Labour		Swing		
Labour hold		Swing		
Labour hold		Swing		

=== South Woodford ===
South Woodford (3)
Party	Candidate	Votes	%	±%
Labour	Beverley Brewer*	1464	32.8	▼16.7
Green	Monika Patel	1309	29.3	▲17.7
Green	Kallan Greybe	1299	29.1	▲21.5
Labour	Joe Hehir*	1296	29.0	▼13.9
Green	Jaya Narinesingh	1247	27.9	N/A
Labour	Robert Newman	1214	27.2	▼14.6
Conservative	Suzanne Nolan	978	21.9	▼16.2
Conservative	Paul Canal*	962	21.5	▼14.2
Conservative	Robert Cole	871	19.5	▼14.7
Reform	Sam Chapman	633	14.2	N/A
Reform	Jonathan Santaub	557	12.5	N/A
Reform	Sam Windle	540	12.1	N/A
Liberal Democrats	Crispin Acton	324	7.3	▼4.0
Liberal Democrats	Scott Wilding	297	6.6	▼3.5
Turnout		4467	49.67	▲6.17
Labour hold		Swing		
Green gain from Labour		Swing		
Green gain from Labour		Swing		

=== Valentines ===
Valentines (3)
Party	Candidate	Votes	%	±%
Redbridge Ind.	Rashida Choudhery	1576	37.7	N/A
Labour	Alex Charlton-Holmes*	1501	35.9	−33.3
Redbridge Ind.	Marwan Elfallah	1435	34.3	N/A
Redbridge Ind.	Munaf Gani	1417	33.9	N/A
Labour	Khayer Chowdhury*	1362	32.6	−34.5
Labour	Kumud Joshi*	1228	29.4	−32.7
Green	Waheed Arshad	624	14.9	N/A
Green	Malik Khalid	565	13.5	N/A
Conservative	Anu Kapoor	408	9.8	−13.4
Conservative	Priti Bhatawadekar	399	9.5	−11.7
Conservative	Ahsan Uddin	300	7.2	−11.9
Reform	Daniel Blackwell	294	7.0	N/A
Reform	Frederick Brown	266	6.4	N/A
Reform	Brian Mankin	234	5.6	N/A
Independent	Neelam Pahl	164	3.9	N/A
Liberal Democrats	Neil Bell	138	3.3	N/A
Turnout		4179	38.94	+12.94
Redbridge Ind. gain from Labour		Swing		
Labour hold		Swing		
Redbridge Ind. gain from Labour		Swing		

=== Wanstead Park ===
Wanstead Park (2)
Party	Candidate	Votes	%	±%
Labour	Emma Shepherd-Mallinson*	1183	37.0	▼21.1
Green	Milli Clack	1156	36.2	▲15.5
Green	Nadir Gilani	1102	34.5	N/A
Labour	Simon Miller	1047	32.8	▼22.4
Reform	Andrew Joyce	384	12.0	N/A
Reform	Yit Phoenix	353	11.0	N/A
Conservative	Paul Smith	349	10.9	▼10.2
Conservative	David Thom	324	10.1	▼8.4
Liberal Democrats	Alan Thomas	175	5.5	▼5.7
Liberal Democrats	Neil Hepworth	161	5.0	▼2.5
Turnout		3195	53.06	▲8.26
Labour hold		Swing		
Green gain from Labour		Swing		

=== Wanstead Village ===
Wanstead Village (3)
Party	Candidate	Votes	%	±%
Labour	Jo Blackman*	1715	35.5	▼14.9
Green	Sue Whitehead	1478	30.6	▲18.3
Labour	Daniel Morgan-Thomas*	1415	29.3	▼15.2
Green	Md Ali	1306	27.0	▲17.3
Labour	Neal Vithlani	1254	26.0	▼16.0
Green	Rabiya Tehseen	1230	25.5	▲18.3
Liberal Democrats	Mark Gitsham	782	16.2	▼4.4
Conservative	Mark Scannell	726	15.0	▼8.5
Conservative	David Smith	716	14.8	▼6.3
Conservative	Corbyn D'Alanno	683	14.1	▼6.0
Reform	William Collins	649	13.4	N/A
Reform	David Davies	621	12.9	N/A
Reform	Sharmon Lewis	577	11.9	N/A
Liberal Democrats	Humza Sair	568	11.8	▼7.9
Liberal Democrats	Mohammed Uddin	455	9.4	▼7.6
Turnout		4832	51.08	▲8.38
Labour hold		Swing		
Green gain from Labour		Swing		
Labour hold		Swing		

Full Results
