= 1994 Redbridge London Borough Council election =

1994 local election in England

← 1990	5 May 1994	1998 →

All 62 seats up for election to Redbridge London Borough Council 32 seats needed for a majority
- Registered: 163,377
- Turnout: 80,568, 49.31% (▲0.80)

	First party	Second party	Third party
Leader	Elizabeth A. Pearce	Ronald I. Barden	Unknown
Party	Labour	Conservative	Liberal Democrats
Leader since	1994	1991	Unknown
Leader's seat	Seven Kings	Clayhall	Unknown
Last election	18 seats, 48.09%	42 seats, 48.09%	3 seats, 10.06%
Seats before	17	42	3
Seats won	29	24	9
Seat change	▲12	▼18	▲6
Popular vote	87,268	85,216	48,158
Percentage	39.41%	38.48%	14.52%
Swing	▲1.74	▼9.61	▲4.46
Council control before election
Conservative
Council control after election
No Overall Control

The 1994 Redbridge Council election took place on 5 May 1994 to elect members of Redbridge London Borough Council in London, England. The whole council was up for election and the council went into no overall control.

== Background ==
As a result of the East London Boroughs (London Borough Boundaries) Order 1993, the council lost a seat in the Goodmayes ward, as well as swapping several areas between itself and Barking and Dagenham London Borough Council.

== Election result ==
1994 Redbridge London Borough Council elections
Party	Seats	Gains	Losses	Net gain/loss	Seats %	Votes %	Votes	+/−
Labour	29	12	0	▲12	46.77	39.41	87,268	
Conservative	24	0	18	▼18	38.71	38.48	85,216	
Liberal Democrats	9	6	0	▲6	14.52	21.75	48,158	
Independent	0	0	0	Steady	0.00	0.26	584	
BNP	0	0	0	Steady	0.00	0.07	145	
Communist	0	0	0	Steady	0.00	0.03	66	
Total	62						221,437	

== Ward results ==
(*) - Indicates an incumbent candidate

(†) - Indicates an incumbent candidate standing in a different ward

=== Aldborough ===
Aldborough (3)
Party	Candidate	Votes	%	±%
Labour	Desmond Thurlby	1,536	46.53	▲10.64
Labour	Kenneth Turner	1,518		
Labour	Raymond Ward	1,424		
Conservative	Graham Borrott*	1,378	41.63	▼2.10
Conservative	David Jones*	1,326		
Conservative	Ernest Watts*	1,304		
Liberal Democrats	John Tyne	389	11.84	▲3.00
Liberal Democrats	Walter Staight	388		
Liberal Democrats	Naren Dattani	364		
Registered electors		6,641		▼2,004
Turnout		3,476	52.34	▲3.28
Rejected ballots		3	0.09	▲0.07
Labour gain from Conservative				
Labour gain from Conservative				
Labour gain from Conservative				

=== Barkingside ===
Barkingside (3)
Party	Candidate	Votes	%	±%
Conservative	Keith Axon*	1,931	46.78	▼4.10
Conservative	Roy Brunnen*	1,886		
Conservative	Thomas Cobb*	1,870		
Labour	Ronald Belkin	1,557	36.91	▲8.32
Labour	Carol Dicker	1,518		
Labour	Trevor Dicker	1,413		
Liberal Democrats	Rochelle Markovitch	711	16.31	▲8.39
Liberal Democrats	Andrew Bond	666		
Liberal Democrats	Ian Ward	607		
Registered electors		9,462		▼181
Turnout		4,338	45.85	Steady
Rejected ballots		4	0.09	▲0.07
Conservative hold				
Conservative hold				
Conservative hold				

=== Bridge ===
Bridge (3)
Party	Candidate	Votes	%	±%
Labour	Coral Jackson	1,666	41.19	▲7.21
Conservative	Peter Lawrence	1,640	42.11	▼4.53
Conservative	Morris Hickey	1,583		
Conservative	Tak Chan*	1,566		
Labour	Robert Littlewood	1,556		
Labour	Mohammed Sheikh	1,461		
Liberal Democrats	Leslie Everest	657	16.70	▲8.45
Liberal Democrats	Nicolette Pashby	649		
Liberal Democrats	James Swallow	594		
Registered electors		8,379		▼366
Turnout		4,131	49.30	▼0.56
Rejected ballots		5	0.12	▲0.05
Labour gain from Conservative				
Conservative hold				
Conservative hold				

=== Chadwell ===
Chadwell (3)
Party	Candidate	Votes	%	±%
Liberal Democrats	Gary Staight	2,341	47.17	▲36.83
Liberal Democrats	David Green	2,234		
Liberal Democrats	Ralph Scott	2,108		
Conservative	Robert Cole*	1,455	29.92	▼18.19
Conservative	Laurence Davies*	1,406		
Conservative	Robert Summers	1,379		
Labour	Thomas Davis	1,154	22.91	▼10.34
Labour	Frances Smith	1,087		
Labour	Khalid Sharif	1,004		
Registered electors		9,067		▼297
Turnout		4,997	55.11	▲6.53
Rejected ballots		4	0.08	▼0.03
Liberal Democrats gain from Conservative				
Liberal Democrats gain from Conservative				
Liberal Democrats gain from Conservative				

=== Church End ===
Church End (3)
Party	Candidate	Votes	%	±%
Liberal Democrats	Maureen Hoskins*	2,288	60.15	▲13.67
Liberal Democrats	Richard Hoskins*	2,214		
Liberal Democrats	Hugh Cleaver*	2,176		
Conservative	David Greaves	1,016	26.75	▼12.76
Conservative	Linda Huggett	1,010		
Conservative	Noel Macklin	943		
Labour	Richard Bayliss	498	13.10	▼0.91
Labour	Jean Blake	480		
Labour	Peter Bradley	476		
Registered electors		7,491		▼116
Turnout		3,914	52.25	▼0.74
Rejected ballots		5	0.13	▼0.02
Liberal Democrats hold				
Liberal Democrats hold				
Liberal Democrats hold				

=== Clayhall ===
Clayhall (3)
Party	Candidate	Votes	%	±%
Conservative	Alan Weinberg*	2,317	53.95	▼8.41
Conservative	Ronald Baren*	2,288		
Conservative	John Lovell*	2,223		
Labour	Keith Darlington	1,452	32.78	▲8.45
Labour	Jon Fogarty	1,358		
Labour	Richard Thomas	1,338		
Liberal Democrats	Daniel Finkletaub	637	13.27	▲5.88
Liberal Democrats	Susan Hamlyn	542		
Liberal Democrats	Valmai Stevens	502		
Registered electors		9,555		▲108
Turnout		4,519	47.29	▲0.56
Rejected ballots		11	0.24	▲0.10
Conservative hold				
Conservative hold				
Conservative hold				

=== Clementswood ===
Clementswood (3)
Party	Candidate	Votes	%	±%
Labour	Simon Green	1,987	59.64	▲4.81
Labour	Peter Laugharne	1,947		
Labour	Faiz Noor*	1,902		
Conservative	Harry Jennings-Bateman	948	28.55	▼0.54
Conservative	Brian Mendham	940		
Conservative	Roseanne Serrelli	906		
Liberal Democrats	Helen Glanfield	402	11.81	▲4.28
Liberal Democrats	John Collis	387		
Liberal Democrats	Stephne Newsham	365		
Registered electors		7,866		▼280
Turnout		3,631	46.16	▲1.35
Rejected ballots		3	0.08	▼0.08
Labour hold				
Labour hold				
Labour hold				

=== Cranbrook ===
Cranbrook (3)
Party	Candidate	Votes	%	±%
Conservative	Charles Elliman*	1,736	42.61	▼1.10
Conservative	Keith Langford* (Note: Langford replaced CllrmArnold Kinzley after his death in 1993)	1,698		
Conservative	Asaf Mirza*	1,664		
Labour	Joseph Hoedemaker	1,615	39.93	▲10.50
Labour	Provat Das Gupta	1,588		
Labour	Anne Mallach	1,572		
Liberal Democrats	George Hogarth	806	17.46	▲12.15
Liberal Democrats	Mark Rowland	657		
Liberal Democrats	Kenneth Yau	626		
Registered electors		7,753		▲61
Turnout		4,364	56.29	▲1.81
Rejected ballots		5	0.11	▲0.11
Conservative hold				
Conservative hold				
Conservative hold				

=== Fairlop ===
Fairlop (3)
Party	Candidate	Votes	%	±%
Conservative	Joyce Ryan*	1,599	41.71	▼4.79
Labour	Mary Lambert	1,567	40.68	▲5.48
Labour	Dean Milton	1,549		
Conservative	Trevor Grant	1,540		
Conservative	Clifton Welch	1,492		
Labour	Harmegh Rattan	1,403		
Liberal Democrats	Lily Smith	690	17.61	▲9.57
Liberal Democrats	Renee Giller	642		
Liberal Democrats	Dominic Black	623		
Registered electors		8,261		▼325
Turnout		3,962	47.96	▼1.71
Rejected ballots		1	0.03	▼0.04
Conservative hold				
Labour gain from Conservative				
Labour gain from Conservative				

=== Fullwell ===
Fullwell (3)
Party	Candidate	Votes	%	±%
Conservative	Dennis Candy*	1,754	49.84	▼2.75
Conservative	Malcolm Stilwell*	1,694		
Conservative	Alan Hughes	1,651		
Labour	Sidney Hollands	1,221	34.71	▲5.35
Labour	Wendy Hollands	1,207		
Labour	Paul Loften	1,124		
Liberal Democrats	Shelagh Renwick	567	15.45	▲8.08
Liberal Democrats	David Channon	525		
Liberal Democrats	Major Basi	488		
Registered electors		8,532		▼71
Turnout		3,725	43.66	▼0.57
Rejected ballots		3	0.08	▼0.03
Conservative hold				
Conservative hold				
Conservative hold				

=== Goodmayes ===
Goodmayes (2)
Party	Candidate	Votes	%	±%
Labour	Reginald Golding	827	46.09	▼9.97
Labour	Sidney Middleburgh^{†} (Note: Middleburgh was a sitting councillor representing the Loxford ward)	813		
Conservative	Ruth Kinzley	622	34.74	▲7.07
Conservative	Shahlab Baig	613		
Liberal Democrats	Alexander McLean	197	11.02	▲3.66
Liberal Democrats	Richard Torney	195		
BNP	Paul Bixby	145	8.15	New
Registered electors		3,458		▼5,028
Turnout		1,848	53.44	▲11.93
Rejected ballots		2	0.11	Steady
Labour win (new boundaries)				
Labour win (new boundaries)				

=== Hainault ===
Hainault (3)
Party	Candidate	Votes	%	±%
Labour	Linda Perham*	1,755	57.42	▲6.02
Labour	John Fairley-Churchill^{†} (Note: Fairley-Churchill was a sitting councillor representing the Goodmayes ward)	1,721		
Labour	Edmund Peake	1,676		
Conservative	Winifred Axon	856	28.09	▼1.78
Conservative	James Howes	838		
Conservative	Barbara Wilson	827		
Liberal Democrats	Kathleen Black	468	14.48	▲5.41
Liberal Democrats	Robert Wright	434		
Liberal Democrats	Peter Prager	398		
Registered electors		7,015		▼249
Turnout		3,203	45.66	▼2.48
Rejected ballots		4	0.12	▲0.09
Labour hold				
Labour hold				
Labour hold				

=== Loxford ===
Loxford (3)
Party	Candidate	Votes	%	±%
Labour	Muhammed Javed*	2,381	69.31	▲6.16
Labour	Royston Emmett	2,180		
Labour	Faredoon Maravala	2,065		
Conservative	Mark Olbrich	642	19.36	▼3.74
Conservative	Ghulam Khan	623		
Conservative	Berenice Omari	586		
Liberal Democrats	David Fleetwood	410	11.33	▲5.38
Liberal Democrats	David Fairlamb	347		
Liberal Democrats	Bushra Khan	327		
Registered electors		8,182		▼207
Turnout		3,653	44.65	▲0.19
Rejected ballots		10	0.27	▲0.22
Labour hold				
Labour hold				
Labour hold				

=== Mayfield ===
Mayfield (3)
Party	Candidate	Votes	%	±%
Labour	Christopher Connelley	2,044	50.51	▲12.54
Labour	Lesley Hilton	1,981		
Labour	Norman Tuck	1,933		
Conservative	John Atkins	1,425	34.74	▼11.29
Conservative	Garry Atkins	1,390		
Conservative	Darshan Sharma	1,284		
Liberal Democrats	Eric Papworth	601	14.75	▲5.66
Liberal Democrats	Ian Gravenell	599		
Liberal Democrats	Edwin Potkins	540		
Registered electors		8,532		▼46
Turnout		4,279	50.15	▼0.43
Rejected ballots		7	0.16	▲0.09
Labour gain from Conservative				
Labour gain from Conservative				
Labour gain from Conservative				

=== Monkhams ===
Monkhams (3)
Party	Candidate	Votes	%	±%
Conservative	Louise Hyams*	2,117	61.18	▼7.17
Conservative	Michael Stark* (Note: Stark replaced Cllr Nancy Thurgood after her death in 1993)	2,048		
Conservative	Gilbert Seymour*	2,041		
Liberal Democrats	Michael McElarney	823	22.97	▲13.46
Liberal Democrats	Susan Skinner	779		
Liberal Democrats	Geoffrey Seeff	730		
Labour	Alan Barnett	552	15.85	▲1.58
Labour	Daphne Griffith	544		
Labour	Philip Pollard	513		
Registered electors		7,650		▼60
Turnout		3,588	46.90	▼3.06
Rejected ballots		8	0.22	▲0.14
Conservative hold				
Conservative hold				
Conservative hold				

=== Newbury ===
Newbury (3)
Party	Candidate	Votes	%	±%
Labour	Brian Myers	2,103	52.28	▲15.51
Labour	Norman Hilton	2,032		
Labour	Dev Sharma	2,023		
Conservative	Harold Moth*	1,484	37.00	▼4.65
Conservative	Glenn Corfield*	1,460		
Conservative	John Cable	1,415		
Liberal Democrats	Paul Wood	437	10.72	▲0.44
Liberal Democrats	Amelia Olive	425		
Liberal Democrats	Allan Wright	400		
Registered electors		7,983		▼109
Turnout		4,229	52.98	▲3.80
Rejected ballots		10	0.24	▲0.09
Labour gain from Conservative				
Labour gain from Conservative				
Labour gain from Conservative				

=== Roding ===
Roding (3)
Party	Candidate	Votes	%	±%
Liberal Democrats	Ian Bond	2,369	56.48	▲31.99
Liberal Democrats	Christina Bradd	2,310		
Liberal Democrats	Gareth Wilson	2,210		
Conservative	Anthony Loffhagen*	1,267	30.33	▼17.58
Conservative	Hazel Weinberg*	1,230		
Conservative	Reginald Woda*	1,201		
Labour	John Cullen	503	11.56	▼4.82
Labour	Ian Gardiner	464		
Labour	Mary Tuffin	443		
Communist	Laurence Laughlin	66	1.62	▼0.28
Registered electors		8,110		▲59
Turnout		4,326	53.34	▲4.15
Rejected ballots		11	0.25	▲0.02
Liberal Democrats gain from Conservative				
Liberal Democrats gain from Conservative				
Liberal Democrats gain from Conservative				

=== Seven Kings ===
Seven Kings (3)
Party	Candidate	Votes	%	±%
Labour	Elizabeth Pearce*	1,703	56.00	▲5.21
Labour	David Masters	1,678		
Labour	Maganbhai Patel	1,661		
Conservative	Valerie Ball	1,013	31.64	▼4.60
Conservative	Anthony Lenaghan	931		
Conservative	Paul Turner	907		
Liberal Democrats	Clive Steniford	378	12.36	New
Liberal Democrats	Eileen Clark	377		
Liberal Democrats	Philip Clark	358		
Registered electors		7,599		▼203
Turnout		3,373	44.39	▼5.07
Rejected ballots		8	0.24	▲0.16
Labour hold				
Labour hold				
Labour hold				

=== Snaresbrook ===
Snaresbrook (3)
Party	Candidate	Votes	%	±%
Conservative	Peter Goody*	1,585	45.06	▼7.08
Conservative	Winifred Roberts*	1,574		
Conservative	Warren Miskin	1,566		
Labour	Gregor Eglin	1,504	41.69	▲10.75
Labour	Brenda Jones	1,452		
Labour	Alan Pearmain	1,416		
Liberal Democrats	Kevyn Davies-Jones	474	13.25	▲5.79
Liberal Democrats	John Swallow	461		
Liberal Democrats	Ralph Stevens	455		
Registered electors		7,288		▼384
Turnout		3,743	51.36	▼0.61
Rejected ballots		1	0.03	▼0.05
Conservative hold				
Conservative hold				
Conservative hold				

=== Valentines ===
Valentines (3)
Party	Candidate	Votes	%	±%
Labour	John Brindley*	1,545	40.83	▼5.21
Labour	Elaine Norman	1,356		
Labour	Virendra Tewari	1,319		
Conservative	Bashir Chaudry	1,069	28.38	▼6.42
Conservative	Maureen Anderson	1,005		
Conservative	Phyllis Cottrell	861		
Independent	Paul Dyer	584	16.95	New
Liberal Democrats	Brian Curtis	537	13.84	▼5.32
Liberal Democrats	Mohamed Seoudy	447		
Liberal Democrats	Albert Williamson	447		
Registered electors		6,964		▼399
Turnout		3,405	48.89	▲1.87
Rejected ballots		4	0.12	▼0.05
Labour hold				
Labour hold				
Labour hold				

=== Wanstead ===
Wanstead (3)
Party	Candidate	Votes	%	±%
Conservative	Allan Burgess*	1,596	42.23	▼0.09
Conservative	Thomas Howl*	1,516		
Conservative	Michael Borrott	1,481		
Labour	Margaret Edelman	1,326	35.89	▲15.98
Labour	Jeffrey Edelman	1,301		
Labour	Allan Tuffin	1,276		
Liberal Democrats	Janet Cornish	897	21.88	▲5.29
Liberal Democrats	Joan Moody	770		
Liberal Democrats	Modupe Ajose	713		
Registered electors		7,589		▲325
Turnout		3,864	50.92	▼2.77
Rejected ballots		16	0.41	▲0.28
Conservative hold				
Conservative hold				
Conservative hold				

== By-elections ==
The following by-elections took place between the 1994 and 1998 elections:

- 1994 Aldborough by-election
- 1996 Newbury by-election
- 1996 Barkingside by-election
- 1996 Seven Kings by-election
- 1997 Hainault by-election
