= Roding =

Roding may refer to:

- River Roding, Essex and London, England
- Roding, Germany, town in the Upper Palatinate of Bavaria
- Roding, sound produced during the mating display of some birds; see drumming (snipe)
- Roding (ward), electoral division in the London Borough of Redbridge
- The Rodings, group of villages in Essex, UK
- Peter Friedrich Röding, German malacologist
