= Mayfield (ward) =

Electoral ward in the London borough of Redbridge

- Electoral ward for the Redbridge London Borough Council
- Mayfield ward boundaries since 2018
- Borough: Redbridge
- County: Greater London
- Population: 16,292 (2021)
- Electorate: 10,196 (2022)
- Major settlements: Seven Kings
- Area: 1.884 square kilometres (0.727 sq mi)

Current electoral ward
- Created: 1965
- Number of members: 1965–1978: 4; 1978–present: 3
- Councillors: Tanweer Khan; Vanisha Solanki; Noor Jahan Begum
- ONS code: 00BCGM (2002–2018)
- GSS code: E05000508 (2002–2018); E05011248 (2018–present)

Mayfield is an electoral ward in the London Borough of Redbridge. The ward has existed since the creation of the borough on 1 April 1965 and was first used in the 1964 elections. It returns councillors to Redbridge London Borough Council. The ward was subject to boundary revisions in 1978, 2002 and 2018. The revision in 1978 reduced the number of councillors from four to three. Notable councillors have been David Amess and Jas Athwal who became members of parliament.

== List of councillors ==
Term	Councillor	Party
1964–1968	L. Gooch	Conservative
1964–1994	Roland Hill	Conservative
1964–1971	L. Hipkins	Conservative
1964–1978	Bert Barker	Conservative
1968–1974	D. Latham	Conservative
1971–1978	H. Pearce	Conservative
1974–1976	J. Jones	Conservative
1976–1978	Carole Maddock	Conservative
1978–1982	Phillis Cottrell	Conservative
1978–1982	Lucette Smith	Conservative
1982–1984	Anthony Day	Conservative
1982–1986	David Amess	Conservative
1984–1994	Trevor Grant	Conservative
1986–1994	Constance Bamford	Conservative
1994–1998	Christopher Connelley	Labour
1994–2002	Lesley Hilton	Labour
1994–1998	Norman Tuck	Labour
1998–2002	Reginald Golding	Labour
1998–2002	Ayodhiya Parkash	Labour
2006–2022	Ayodhiya Parkash	Labour
2002–2010	Mark Aaron	Conservative
2002–2006	Geoffrey Hinds	Conservative
2002–2006	Sukhjit Sohal	Labour
2006–2010	Robert Whitehall	Conservative
2010–2025	Jas Athwal	Labour
2010–2018	Kay Flint	Labour
2022–present	Tanweer Khan	Labour
2022–present	Vanisha Solanki	Labour
2025–present	Noor Jahan Begum	Redbridge Ind.

== Summary ==
Councillors elected by party at each general borough election.

- Conservative
- Labour

== Redbridge council elections since 2018 ==
There was a revision of ward boundaries in Redbridge in 2018. There was a small transfer of territory to Clementswood.

=== 2025 by-election ===
The by-election took place on 27 March 2025, following the resignation of Jas Athwal.

Mayfield by-election, 27 March 2025
Party	Candidate	Votes	%	±%
Ilford Independents	Noor Jahan Begum	1,080	42.5	New
Labour	Mazhar Saleem	663	26.1	▼50.0
Conservative	Robin Thakur	494	19.4	▲2.4
Reform	Paul Luggeri	121	4.8	New
Liberal Democrats	Neil Hepworth	100	3.9	▼3.5
Green	Nadir Iqbal Gilani	85	3.3	New
Turnout		2,549	24.65	▼5.65
Redbridge Ind. gain from Labour				

=== 2022 election ===
The election took place on 5 May 2022.

2022 Redbridge London Borough Council election: Mayfield (3)
Party	Candidate	Votes	%	±%
Labour	Jas Athwal	2,349	76.1	▼0.0
Labour	Tanweer Khan	2,148	69.6	▼3.3
Labour	Vanisha Solanki	2,125	68.9	▼1.8
Conservative	Carol Corbin	525	17.0	▼4.7
Conservative	Maria Begum	470	15.2	▼6.1
Conservative	Masood Khushi Pasha	360	11.7	▼5.6
Liberal Democrats	Sufia Khanam	229	7.4	New
Ind. Network	Majad Hussain	218	7.1	New
Turnout		3,086	30.3	▼4.8
Labour hold				
Labour hold				
Labour hold				

=== 2018 election ===
The election took place on 3 May 2018.

2018 Redbridge London Borough Council election: Mayfield (3)
Party	Candidate	Votes	%	±%
Labour	Jas Athwal	2,717	76.11	N/A
Labour	Kay Flint	2,602	72.89	N/A
Labour	Ayodhiya Parkash	2,523	70.67	N/A
Conservative	Wilson Chowdhry	774	21.68	N/A
Conservative	Stuart Halstead	761	21.32	N/A
Conservative	Zeb Quddos	619	17.34	N/A
Turnout		3,570	35.13	
Labour win (new boundaries)				
Labour win (new boundaries)				
Labour win (new boundaries)				

== 2002–2018 Redbridge council elections ==
Mayfield ward boundaries from 2002 to 2018

There was a revision of ward boundaries in Redbridge in 2002. Territory was lost in the north to Goodmayes ward between Breamore Road and the London–Shenfield railway line. Territory was gained west of South Park Drive from Clementswood ward, including South Park and Loxford School.

=== 2014 election ===
The election took place on 22 May 2014.

2014 Redbridge London Borough Council election: Mayfield (3)
Party	Candidate	Votes	%	±%
Labour	Jas Athwal	2,731		
Labour	Kay Flint	2,620		
Labour	Ayodhiya Parkash	2,597		
Conservative	Kaiser Chaudhary	1,034		
Conservative	Pauline Fynn	928		
Conservative	Nisha Patel	904		
Liberal Democrats	Pamela Winborne	260		
Turnout				
Labour hold		Swing		
Labour hold		Swing		
Labour hold		Swing		

=== 2010 election ===
The election on 6 May 2010 took place on the same day as the United Kingdom general election.

2010 Redbridge London Borough Council election: Mayfield (3)
Party	Candidate	Votes	%	±%
Labour	Jas Athwal	3,100		
Labour	Ayodhiya Parkash	2,857		
Labour	Kay Flint	2,850		
Conservative	Surendra Patel	1,771		
Conservative	Dennis Aylen	1,732		
Conservative	Renu Phull	1,555		
Liberal Democrats	Robert Boulton	900		
Liberal Democrats	Leonard Filtness	702		
Liberal Democrats	Hazel Redshaw	614		
Respect	Baharul Shayeb	437		
Respect	Anhar Rouf	428		
Respect	Hilal Miah	417		
Turnout			63.35	+22.45
Labour gain from Conservative		Swing		
Labour hold		Swing		
Labour gain from Conservative		Swing		

=== 2006 election ===
The election took place on 4 May 2006.

2006 Redbridge London Borough Council election: Mayfield (3)
Party	Candidate	Votes	%	±%
Labour	Ayodhiya Parkash	1,530	42.7	
Conservative	Robert Whitehall	1,505	42.0	
Conservative	Mark Aaron	1,495		
Labour	Pamela Stephenson	1,450		
Conservative	Geoffrey Hinds	1,390		
Labour	Barbara White	1,326		
Liberal Democrats	Ahsan-ul-Haq Chaudry	549	15.3	
Liberal Democrats	Deborah Lake	524		
Liberal Democrats	Susan Mann	480		
Turnout			40.9	
Labour hold		Swing		
Conservative hold		Swing		
Conservative hold		Swing		

=== 2002 election ===
The election took place on 2 May 2002.

2002 Redbridge London Borough Council election: Mayfield (3)
Party	Candidate	Votes	%	±%
Conservative	Mark Aaron	1,245	14.6	
Conservative	Geoffrey Hinds	1,233	14.5	
Labour	Sukhjit Sohal	1,212	14.3	
Labour	Ayodhiya Parkash	1,192	14.0	
Labour	Tanweer Khan	1,157	13.6	
Conservative	Matthew Pether	1,151	13.5	
Liberal Democrats	Ian Gravenell	383	4.5	
Liberal Democrats	Frank Marsh	342	4.0	
Liberal Democrats	Edwin Potkins	309	3.6	
Green	Jane Wild	248	2.9	
Total votes		8,471	100	
Turnout			34.6	
Conservative win (new boundaries)				
Conservative win (new boundaries)				
Labour win (new boundaries)				

== 1978–2002 Redbridge council elections ==
Mayfield ward boundaries from 1978 to 1994

There was a revision of ward boundaries in Redbridge in 1978. Some territory to the southwest of Seven Kings station was transferred to Clementswood ward. On 1 April 1994 Barking Abbey School was transferred out of the ward and Redbridge to Longbridge ward in Barking and Dagenham.

=== 1998 election ===
The election took place on 7 May 1998.

1998 Redbridge London Borough Council election: Mayfield (3)
Party	Candidate	Votes	%	±%
Labour	Lesley Hilton	1,567		
Labour	Reginald Golding	1,547		
Labour	Ayodhiya Parkash	1,528		
Conservative	David Clarke	1,225		
Conservative	Arthur Leggatt	1,011		
Conservative	Mohammed Shaikh	906		
Liberal Democrats	Eric Papworth	314		
Liberal Democrats	Edwin Potkins	216		
Liberal Democrats	Richard Torney	213		
Turnout				
Labour hold		Swing		
Labour hold		Swing		
Labour hold		Swing		

=== 1994 election ===
The election took place on 5 May 1994.

1994 Redbridge London Borough Council election: Mayfield (3)
Party	Candidate	Votes	%	±%
Labour	Christopher Connelley	2,044	50.51	▲12.54
Labour	Lesley Hilton	1,981		
Labour	Norman Tuck	1,933		
Conservative	John Atkins	1,425	34.74	▼11.29
Conservative	Garry Atkins	1,390		
Conservative	Darshan Sharma	1,284		
Liberal Democrats	Eric Papworth	601	14.75	▲5.66
Liberal Democrats	Ian Gravenell	599		
Liberal Democrats	Edwin Potkins	540		
Registered electors		8,532		▼46
Turnout		4,279	50.15	▼0.43
Rejected ballots		7	0.16	▲0.09
Labour gain from Conservative				
Labour gain from Conservative				
Labour gain from Conservative				

=== 1990 election ===
The election took place on 3 May 1990.

1990 Redbridge London Borough Council election: Mayfield (3)
Party	Candidate	Votes	%	±%
Conservative	Constance Bamford	2,046	46.03	
Conservative	Trevor Grant	1,936		
Conservative	Roland Hill	1,909		
Labour	Adrian Clements	1,704	37.97	
Labour	Walter Maclean	1,620		
Labour	Ronald Madell	1,537		
Lib Dem Focus Team	Stanley Colyer	418	9.09	
Lib Dem Focus Team	Ralph Scott	392		
Lib Dem Focus Team	Dennis Robertson	354		
Green	Ruth Elberg	295	6.91	
Registered electors		8,578		
Turnout		4,339	50.58	
Rejected ballots		3	0.07	
Conservative hold				
Conservative hold				
Conservative hold				

=== 1986 election ===
The election took place on 8 May 1986.

1986 Redbridge London Borough Council election: Mayfield (3)
Party	Candidate	Votes	%	±%
Conservative	Trevor Grant	2,008		
Conservative	Constance Bamford	1,968		
Conservative	Roland Hill	1,941		
Labour	Allen Maclean	1,405		
Labour	Walter Maclean	1,323		
Labour	Gwyneth Phillips	1,195		
Alliance	Stanley Colyer	510		
Alliance	Frank Marsh	425		
Alliance	Ronald Mavers	406		
Turnout				
Conservative hold		Swing		
Conservative hold		Swing		
Conservative hold		Swing		

=== 1984 by-election ===
The by-election took place on 16 February 1984, following the resignation of Anthony Day.

1984 Mayfield by-election
Party	Candidate	Votes	%	±%
Conservative	Trevor Grant	1,630		
Labour	Royston Emmett	1,186		
Alliance	Stanley Colyer	427		
Turnout				
Conservative hold		Swing		

=== 1982 election ===
The election took place on 6 May 1982.

1982 Redbridge London Borough Council election: Mayfield (3)
Party	Candidate	Votes	%	±%
Conservative	Anthony Day	2,730		
Conservative	David Amess	2,698		
Conservative	Roland Hill	2,651		
Labour	Victor Bourne	944		
Labour	Paul Jeater	894		
Labour	Bernard Lipman	888		
Alliance	Charles Burgess	711		
Alliance	Peter Smith	584		
Alliance	Freda Marks	581		
Turnout				
Conservative hold		Swing		
Conservative hold		Swing		
Conservative hold		Swing		

=== 1978 election ===
The election took place on 4 May 1978.

1978 Redbridge London Borough Council election: Mayfield (3)
Party	Candidate	Votes	%	±%
Conservative	Phillis Cottrell	2,417		
Conservative	Roland Hill	2,353		
Conservative	Lucette Smith	2,277		
Labour	Charles Burgess	1,141		
Labour	Christopher Blackwell	1,054		
Labour	Frances Payne	1,038		
Liberal	Bernard Boon	234		
Liberal	Hugh Kenna	202		
Liberal	Robert Newland	200		
Turnout				
Conservative win (new boundaries)				
Conservative win (new boundaries)				
Conservative win (new boundaries)				

== 1964–1978 Redbridge council elections ==
External image
- Map showing Mayfield ward boundaries from 1965 to 1978

=== 1976 by-election ===
The by-election took place on 6 May 1976.

1976 Mayfield by-election
Party	Candidate	Votes	%	±%
Conservative	Carole Maddock	2,597		
Labour	Charles Burgess	1,491		
Liberal	Gareth Wilson	324		
Turnout			42.9	
Conservative hold		Swing		

=== 1974 election ===
The election took place on 2 May 1974.

1974 Redbridge London Borough Council election: Mayfield (4)
Party	Candidate	Votes	%	±%
Conservative	J. Jones	2,059		
Conservative	Roland Hill	2,051		
Conservative	H. Pearce	2,040		
Conservative	Bert Barker	2,024		
Labour	Charles Burgess	1,477		
Labour	D. Cunningham	1,460		
Labour	R. Hutton	1,407		
Labour	J. O'Reilly	1,401		
Liberal	J. Boden	422		
Liberal	Bernard Boon	422		
Liberal	R. Farrow	397		
Liberal	M. Way	386		
Turnout				
Conservative hold		Swing		
Conservative hold		Swing		
Conservative hold		Swing		
Conservative hold		Swing		

=== 1971 election ===
The election took place on 13 May 1971.

1971 Redbridge London Borough Council election: Mayfield (4)
Party	Candidate	Votes	%	±%
Conservative	D. Latham	2,189		
Conservative	Bert Barker	2,174		
Conservative	H. Pearce	2,170		
Conservative	Roland Hill	2,140		
Labour	Charles Burgess	1,630		
Labour	D. Cunningham	1,584		
Labour	C. Pyke	1,529		
Labour	B. Vadher	1,428		
Liberal	N. Davis	296		
Liberal	Bernard Boon	293		
Liberal	W. Spring	276		
Liberal	M. Jaeger-Carlsen	239		
Turnout				
Conservative hold		Swing		
Conservative hold		Swing		
Conservative hold		Swing		
Conservative hold		Swing		

=== 1968 election ===
The election took place on 9 May 1968.

1968 Redbridge London Borough Council election: Mayfield (4)
Party	Candidate	Votes	%	±%
Conservative	Bert Barker	2,860		
Conservative	Roland Hill	2,841		
Conservative	L. Hipkins	2,814		
Conservative	D. Latham	2,809		
Liberal	G. Bellamy	830		
Liberal	J. Vincent	734		
Liberal	M. Kennelly	704		
Liberal	Bernard Boon	703		
Labour	Charles Burgess	543		
Labour	A. Chatten	489		
Labour	J. Fergus	481		
Labour	H. Jewitt	478		
Turnout				
Conservative hold		Swing		
Conservative hold		Swing		
Conservative hold		Swing		
Conservative hold		Swing		

=== 1964 election ===
The election took place on 7 May 1964.

1964 Redbridge London Borough Council election: Mayfield (4)
Party	Candidate	Votes	%	±%
Conservative	L. Gooch	1,960		
Conservative	Roland Hill	1,900		
Conservative	L. Hipkins	1,885		
Conservative	Bert Barker	1,793		
Liberal	G. Bellamy	1,509		
Liberal	G. Barrett	1,465		
Liberal	H. Parker	1,446		
Liberal	K. Ives	1,415		
Labour	N. Stringer	1,086		
Labour	J. Simmons	1,057		
Labour	T. Williams	1,044		
Labour	H. Jewitt	1,043		
Communist	R. Shannon	120		
Turnout				
Conservative win (new seat)				
Conservative win (new seat)				
Conservative win (new seat)				
Conservative win (new seat)				
