= Chadwell (ward) =

Electoral ward in Greater London, England

- Electoral ward for the Redbridge London Borough Council
- Chadwell ward boundaries since 2018
- Borough: Redbridge
- County: Greater London
- Population: 16,529 (2021)
- Electorate: 10,777 (2022)
- Area: 1.553 square kilometres (0.600 sq mi)

Current electoral ward
- Created: 1965
- Number of members: 1965–1978: 4; 1978–present: 3
- Members: Bert Jones; Muhammad Afzal; Niamh Atkins
- GSS code: E05000498 (2002–2018); E05011237 (2018–present)

Chadwell is an electoral ward in the London Borough of Redbridge. The ward has existed since the creation of the borough on 1 April 1965 and was first used in the 1964 elections. It returns councillors to Redbridge London Borough Council.

== Councillors ==
Election	Councillors		
2002	Gary Staight (Lib Dem)	John Tyne (Lib Dem)	Ralph Scott (Lib Dem)
2006	Gary Staight (Lib Dem)	John Tyne (Lib Dem)	Ralph Scott (Lib Dem)
2010	Wes Streeting (Note: Streeting was not a candidate in the 2010 election, instead winning a by-election to replace Mark Gittens, who was disqualified, making Streeting the one to take up this seat after the 2010 election.) (Labour)	Andy Walker (Labour)	Baldesh Kaur Nijiar (Labour)
2014	Aziz Choudhury (Labour)	Neil Zammett (Labour)	Anne Sachs (Labour)
2018	Bert Jones (Labour)	Hannah Chaudhry (Labour)	Anne Sachs (Labour)
2022	Bert Jones (Labour)	Hannah Chaudhry (Labour)	Anne Sachs (Labour)
2026	Bert Jones (Labour)	Muhammad Afzal (Redbridge Independents)	Niamh Atkins (Green)

== Redbridge council elections since 2018 ==
There was a revision of ward boundaries in Redbridge in 2018.

=== 2026 election ===
Hannah Chaudhry resigned in April 2026, with the by-election deferred until May 2026. (Note: Casual vacancies occurring within six months of scheduled elections are not filled.)

=== 2022 election ===
The election took place on 5 May 2022.

2022 Redbridge London Borough Council election: Chadwell
Party	Candidate	Votes	%	±%
Labour	Hannah Chaudhry	1,928	62.2	▲3.0
Labour	Bert Jones	1,802	58.1	▲3.7
Labour	Anne Sachs	1,782	57.5	▲1.7
Conservative	Shirley Baah-Mensah	847	27.3	▲0.3
Conservative	Katherine Egbun	809	26.1	▲2.0
Conservative	Raj Forhad	741	23.9	▲0.2
Green	John Tyne	532	17.2	▲7.7
Turnout		3,101	28.8	▼5.2
Labour hold		Swing		
Labour hold		Swing		
Labour hold		Swing		

=== 2018 election ===
The election took place on 3 May 2018.

2018 Redbridge London Borough Council election: Chadwell
Party	Candidate	Votes	%	±%
Labour	Bert Jones	2,279	61.81	N/A
Labour	Hannah Chaudhry	2,183	59.21	N/A
Labour	Anne Sachs	2,057	55.79	N/A
Conservative	Simon Hearn	997	27.04	N/A
Conservative	Mohammed Uddin	887	24.06	N/A
Conservative	Diana Danescu	874	23.70	N/A
Liberal Democrats	Gary Staight	350	9.49	N/A
Green	John Tyne	350	9.49	N/A
Turnout		3,687	34.04	
Labour win (new boundaries)				
Labour win (new boundaries)				
Labour win (new boundaries)				

== 2002–2018 Redbridge council elections ==
Chadwell ward boundaries from 2002 to 2018

There was a revision of ward boundaries in Redbridge in 2002.

=== 2014 election ===
The election took place on 22 May 2014.

2014 Redbridge London Borough Council election: Chadwell
Party	Candidate	Votes	%	±%
Labour	Aziz Choudhury	2,352		
Labour	Anne Sachs	1,975		
Labour	Neil Zammett	1,707		
Conservative	Mohammed Uddin	1,106		
Conservative	Bharat Parmar	917		
Conservative	Kunle Olaifa	878		
Green	John Tyne	605		
Independent	Paul Wiffen	474		
Liberal Democrats	Naren Dattani	237		
Liberal Democrats	Kathleen Teahan	213		
Turnout				
Labour hold		Swing		
Labour hold		Swing		
Labour hold		Swing		

=== 2010 by-election ===
The by-election took place on 8 July 2010, following the disqualification of Mark Gittens.

2010 Chadwell by-election
Party	Candidate	Votes	%	±%
Labour	Wes Streeting	800	31.5	
Conservative	Gary Munro	580	22.9	
Liberal Democrats	John Tyne	576	22.7	
Green	Wilson Chowdhry	413	16.3	
BNP	Julian Leppert	115	4.5	
UKIP	Paul Wiffen	54	2.1	
Majority		220	8.6	
Turnout		2,542	25.5	
Labour hold		Swing		

=== 2010 election ===
The election on 6 May 2010 took place on the same day as the United Kingdom general election.

2010 Redbridge London Borough Council election: Chadwell
Party	Candidate	Votes	%	±%
Labour	Mark Gittens	1,949		
Labour	Andy Walker	1,804		
Labour	Baldesh Kaur Nijjar	1,724		
Liberal Democrats	John Tyne	1,638		
Liberal Democrats	Ralph Scott	1,637		
Conservative	Ashley Heller	1,472		
Liberal Democrats	Riaz Uddin	1,412		
Conservative	Anthony Lenaghan	1,327		
Conservative	Ali Azeem	1,323		
Green	Wilson Chowdhry	897		
Green	Juliet Chowdhry	571		
UKIP	Paul Wiffen	482		
Green	Isla Martin	398		
Turnout			59.96	+21.56
Labour gain from Liberal Democrats		Swing		
Labour gain from Liberal Democrats		Swing		
Labour gain from Liberal Democrats		Swing		

=== 2006 election ===
The election took place on 4 May 2006.

2006 Redbridge London Borough Council election: Chadwell
Party	Candidate	Votes	%	±%
Liberal Democrats	Gary Staight	1,406	38.1	
Liberal Democrats	John Tyne	1,266		
Liberal Democrats	Ralph Scott	1,244		
Conservative	Simon Hearn	889	24.1	
Conservative	Rosemary Barden	837		
Conservative	Dennis Aylen	781		
Labour	Shafiq Chowdhry	772	20.9	
Labour	Gerald Elvin	727		
Labour	Kenzi Egeh	669		
BNP	Jason Douglas	624	16.9	
Turnout			38.4	
Liberal Democrats hold		Swing		
Liberal Democrats hold		Swing		
Liberal Democrats hold		Swing		

=== 2002 election ===
The election took place on 2 May 2002.

2002 Redbridge London Borough Council election: Chadwell
Party	Candidate	Votes	%	±%
Liberal Democrats	Gary Straight	1,386	18.1	
Liberal Democrats	Ralph Scott	1,270	16.6	
Liberal Democrats	John Tyne	1,240	16.2	
Conservative	Elfyn Roberts	778	11.7	
Conservative	Mary Pitt	745	9.7	
Conservative	Pauline Highes	742	9.7	
Labour	Adewale Adeoshun	411	6.1	
Labour	Gurdial Bhamra	456	5.9	
Labour	Ranjit Mudhar	441	5.7	
Total votes		7,649	100	
Turnout			31.4	
Liberal Democrats win (new boundaries)				
Liberal Democrats win (new boundaries)				
Liberal Democrats win (new boundaries)				

== 1994–2002 Redbridge council elections ==
The boundaries of the ward were adjusted on 1 April 1994.

=== 1998 election ===
The election took place on 7 May 1998.

1998 Redbridge London Borough Council election: Chadwell
Party	Candidate	Votes	%	±%
Liberal Democrats	Gary Staight	2,304		
Liberal Democrats	John Tyne	2,050		
Liberal Democrats	Ralph Scott	746		
Labour	Andy Walker	746		
Conservative	Beatrice Corfield	722		
Conservative	Stewart Spivack	636		
Conservative	Maria Mbonye	591		
Labour	Ranjit Mudhar	561		
Labour	Bharat Pathak	560		
Turnout				
Liberal Democrats hold		Swing		
Liberal Democrats hold		Swing		
Liberal Democrats hold		Swing		

=== 1994 election ===
The election took place on 5 May 1994.

1994 Redbridge London Borough Council election: Chadwell
Party	Candidate	Votes	%	±%
Liberal Democrats	Gary Straight	2,341	47.17	▲36.83
Liberal Democrats	David Green	2,234		
Liberal Democrats	Ralph Scott	2,108		
Conservative	Robert Cole	1,455	29.92	▼18.19
Conservative	Laurence Davies	1,406		
Conservative	Robert Summers	1,379		
Labour	Thomas Davis	1,154	22.91	▼10.34
Labour	Frances Smith	1,087		
Labour	Khalid Sharif	1,004		
Registered electors		9,067		▼297
Turnout		4,997	55.11	▲6.53
Rejected ballots		4	0.08	▼0.03
Liberal Democrats win (new boundaries)				
Liberal Democrats win (new boundaries)				
Liberal Democrats win (new boundaries)				

== 1978–1994 Redbridge council elections ==
Chadwell ward boundaries from 1978 to 1994

There was a revision of ward boundaries in Redbridge in 1978.

=== 1990 election ===
The election took place on 3 May 1990.

1990 Redbridge London Borough Council election: Chadwell
Party	Candidate	Votes	%	±%
Conservative	Robert Cole	2,237	48.11	
Conservative	Christopher Annal	2,182		
Conservative	Laurence Davies	2,100		
Labour	Teresa Conway	1,581	33.25	
Labour	Christopher MacCarthy	1,501		
Labour	Josephine Spink	1,424		
Lib Dem Focus Team	David Green	506	10.34	
Lib Dem Focus Team	Dominic Black	453		
Lib Dem Focus Team	Frank Marsh	442		
Green	Carol Small	375	8.30	
Registered electors		9,364		
Turnout		4,549	48.58	
Rejected ballots		5	0.11	
Conservative hold				
Conservative hold				
Conservative hold				

=== 1986 election ===
The election took place on 8 May 1986.

=== December 1984 by-election ===
The by-election took place on 6 December 1984, following the death of John Savage.

December 1984 Chadwell by-election
Party	Candidate	Votes	%	±%
Liberal Alliance FT	Valerle Ball	1,342		
Conservative	Robert Cole	1,169		
Labour	Lesley Hilton	551		
Turnout				
Liberal Alliance FT gain from Conservative		Swing		

=== February 1984 by-election ===
The by-election took place on 16 February 1984, following the resignation of John Banyard.

February 1984 Chadwell by-election
Party	Candidate	Votes	%	±%
Liberal Alliance FT	Gary Stalght	1,933		
Conservative	Robert Cole	1,163		
Labour	Lesley Hilton	514		
Turnout				
Liberal Alliance FT gain from Conservative		Swing		

=== 1982 election ===
The election took place on 6 May 1982.

=== 1978 election ===
The election took place on 4 May 1978.

== 1964–1978 Redbridge council elections ==
External image
- Map showing Chadwell ward boundaries from 1965 to 1978

=== 1974 election ===
The election took place on 2 May 1974.

=== 1971 election ===
The election took place on 15 May 1971.

=== 1968 election ===
The election took place on 9 May 1968.

1968 Redbridge London Borough Council election: Chadwell (4)
Party	Candidate	Votes	%	±%
Conservative	N. Hurst	2,658		
Conservative	A. Cross	2,608		
Conservative	R. Martin	2,573		
Conservative	A. Yates	2,548		
Labour	T. Dicker	553		
Labour	D. Wightman	519		
Labour	A. Hutson	518		
Labour	E. Pye	513		
Liberal	V. Mason	494		
Liberal	R. Ellis	493		
Liberal	M. Silvey	418		
Liberal	V. Shuman	413		
Turnout				
Conservative hold		Swing		
Conservative hold		Swing		
Conservative hold		Swing		
Conservative hold		Swing		

=== 1964 election ===
The election took place on 7 May 1964.

1964 Redbridge London Borough Council election: Chadwell (4)
Party	Candidate	Votes	%	±%
Conservative	H. Bysouth	1,872		
Conservative	C. Gibson	1,817		
Conservative	N. Hurst	1,811		
Conservative	A. White	1,753		
Labour	W. Burgess	1,463		
Labour	G. King	1,404		
Labour	A. Willis	1,377		
Labour	A. Hutson	1,370		
Liberal	V. Mason	833		
Liberal	R. Ellis	831		
Liberal	E. Ives	793		
Liberal	J. Lorek	740		
Communist	L. Beard	111		
Turnout		4,119	36.0	
Conservative win (new seat)				
Conservative win (new seat)				
Conservative win (new seat)				
Conservative win (new seat)				
