= South Woodford (ward) =

Electoral ward in the London Borough of Redbridge

- Electoral ward for the Redbridge London Borough Council
- South Woodford ward boundaries since 2018
- Borough: Redbridge
- County: Greater London
- Population: 12,833 (2021)
- Electorate: 9,027 (2022)
- Area: 2.204 square kilometres (0.851 sq mi)

Current electoral ward
- Created: 2018
- Number of members: 3
- Councillors: Beverley Brewer; Monika Patel; Kallan Greybe
- Created from: Church End, Roding, Snaresbrook
- GSS code: E05011252

South Woodford is an electoral ward in the London Borough of Redbridge. The ward was first used in the 2018 elections. It returns three councillors to Redbridge London Borough Council.

== List of councillors ==
Seat	Councillor	Took office	Left office	Party	Election
1	Suzanne Nolan	2018	2022	Conservative	2018
2	Michael Duffell	2018	2022	Conservative	2018
3	Beverley Brewer	2018	Incumbent	Labour	2018, 2022, 2026
1	Joe Hehir	2022	2026	Labour	2022
2	Saiqa Qayum Hussain	2022	2026	Labour	2022
1	Monika Patel	2026	Incumbent	Green	2026
2	Kallan Greybe	2026	Incumbent	Green	2026

== Redbridge council elections ==
=== 2026 election ===
The election took place on 7 May 2026.

2026 Redbridge London Borough Council election: South Woodford
Party	Candidate	Votes	%	±%
Labour	Beverley Brewer	1,464	32.8	▼16.7
Green	Monika Patel	1,309	29.3	▲17.7
Green	Kallan Greybe	1,299	29.1	▲21.5
Labour	Joe Hehir	1296	29.0	▼13.9
Green	Jaya Narinesingh	1247	27.9	N/A
Labour	Robert Newman	1214	27.2	▼14.6
Conservative	Suzanne Nolan	978	21.9	▼16.2
Conservative	Paul Canal	962	21.5	▼14.2
Conservative	Robert Cole	871	19.5	▼14.7
Reform	Sam Chapman	633	14.2	N/A
Reform	Jonathan Santaub	557	12.5	N/A
Reform	Sam Windle	540	12.1	N/A
Liberal Democrats	Crispin Acton	324	7.3	▼4.0
Liberal Democrats	Scott Wilding	297	6.6	▼3.5
Turnout		4467	49.67	▲6.17
Labour hold		Swing		
Green gain from Labour		Swing		
Green gain from Labour		Swing		

=== 2022 election ===
The election took place on 5 May 2022.

2022 Redbridge London Borough Council election: South Woodford
Party	Candidate	Votes	%	±%
Labour	Beverley Brewer	1,941	49.5	▲11.3
Labour	Joe Hehir	1,685	42.9	▲7.0
Labour	Saiqa Qayum Hussain	1,641	41.8	▲7.3
Conservative	Suzanne Nolan	1,496	38.1	▼0.6
Conservative	Preeti Rana	1,402	35.7	▼3.5
Conservative	Shafi Choudhury	1,343	34.2	▼3.4
Green	Tony Csoka	457	11.6	▲1.8
Liberal Democrats	Gwyneth Deakins	443	11.3	▼6.4
Liberal Democrats	Ian Gardiner	398	10.1	▼5.2
Green	Robert Sheldon	297	7.6	▼0.9
Liberal Democrats	Ian Morley	238	6.1	▼8.3
Turnout		3,925	43.5	▼0.1
Labour hold				
Labour gain from Conservative				
Labour gain from Conservative				

=== 2018 election ===
The election took place on 3 May 2018.

2018 Redbridge London Borough Council election: South Woodford (3)
Party	Candidate	Votes	%	±%
Conservative	Suzanne Nolan	1,554	38.74	N/A
Conservative	Michael Duffell	1,533	38.22	N/A
Labour	Beverley Brewer	1,532	38.19	N/A
Conservative	Joel Herga	1,508	37.60	N/A
Labour	Greg Eglin	1,439	35.88	N/A
Labour	Mark Walker	1,382	34.46	N/A
Liberal Democrats	Natalie Darby	709	17.68	N/A
Liberal Democrats	Paul Emsley	613	15.28	N/A
Liberal Democrats	Nat Pabla	579	14.44	N/A
Green	Lee Burkwood	355	8.85	N/A
Green	Ashley Gunstock	339	8.45	N/A
Green	Barry Cooper	255	6.36	N/A
Turnout		4,011	43.55	
Conservative win (new seat)				
Conservative win (new seat)				
Labour win (new seat)				
