= 2002 Redbridge London Borough Council election =

2002 Redbridge London Borough Council Election
- May 2, 2002

All 63 seats up for election to Redbridge London Borough Council 32 seats needed for a majority
- Registered: 180,860
- Turnout: 61,996, 34.28% (▼1.41)

| | First party | Second party | Third party |
|---|---|---|---|
| Party | Conservative | Labour | Liberal Democrats |
| Last election | 23 seats, 38.62% | 30 seats, 41.21% | 9 seats, 19.71% |
| Seats before | 24 | 27 | 9 |
| Seats after | 33 | 21 | 9 |
| Seat change | ▲10 | ▼9 | Steady |
| Popular vote | 43.60% | 60,8362 | 33,939 |
| Percentage | 75,957 | 35.09% | 19.58% |
| Swing | ▲4.98 | ▼6.12 | ▼0.13 |
- Map of the results of the 2002 Redbridge council election. Conservatives in blue, Labour in red and Liberal Democrats in yellow.
Council control before election
No Overall Control
Council control after election
Conservative

lElections for Redbridge Council in London were held on 2 May 2002. It was a part of the wider 2002 London local elections. The Conservatives won 43% of the vote in the borough. The turnout was 34.26%, a decrease from the 36% seen in the 1998 London local elections.

== Background ==
=== Ward Changes ===
While there were boundary changes this election similar to every other London Borough Council, Redbridge got through it without eliminating wards or adding new wards. They only added a seat to the Goodmayes ward to bring the total number of seats from 62 to 63.

=== Council Composition ===
In between the previous election and this one there was one by-election that occurred, leading to Labour losing a seat to the Conservatives after the resignation of Cllr. Desmond Thurlby in 1998. In addition to this another Labour councillor defected to a third party and another Labour seat was left vacant with too little time to hold a by-election before the main election, which meant the composition of the council just before the election was as follows:

↓
| 28 | 9 | 24 | 1 | 1 |
| Labour | Lib Dem | Conservative | Other | Vacant |

== Election Results ==
2002 Redbridge London Borough Council local election results
| Party | Seats | Gains | Losses | Net gain/loss | Seats % | Votes % | Votes | +/− |
|---|---|---|---|---|---|---|---|---|
| Conservative | 33 | 10 | 0 | ▲10 | 52.38 | 43.60 | 75,597 | ▲4.98 |
| Labour | 21 | 1 | 10 | ▼9 | 33.33 | 35.09 | 60,832 | ▼6.12 |
| Liberal Democrats | 9 | 0 | 0 | Steady | 14.29 | 19.58 | 33,939 | ▼0.13 |
| Green | 0 | 0 | 0 | Steady | 0.00 | 1.00 | 1,740 | ▲0.89 |
| BNP | 0 | 0 | 0 | Steady | 0.00 | 0.57 | 984 | New |
| UKIP | 0 | 0 | 0 | Steady | 0.00 | 0.16 | 280 | New |
| Total | 63 | | | | | | 173,372 | |

After the election the composition of the council was as follows:

↓
| 21 | 9 | 33 |
| Labour | Lib Dem | Conservative |

== Ward results ==
(*) - Indicates an incumbent candidate

(†) - Indicates an incumbent candidate standing in a different ward

=== Aldborough ===
Aldborough (3)
| Party | Candidate | Votes | % | ±% |
|---|---|---|---|---|
| Conservative | Vanessa Cole* (Note: Cole was elected in a by-election triggered by the resignation of Desmond Thurlby in 1998) | 1,516 | 46.7 | |
| Labour | John Coombes* | 1,385 | 42.6 | |
| Conservative | Loraine Sladden | 1,354 | 41.7 | |
| Conservative | Rajinder Athwal | 1,329 | 40.9 | |
| Labour | Linda Guerin | 1,218 | 37.5 | |
| Labour | Balvinder Saund | 1,073 | 33.0 | |
| Liberal Democrats | Susan Mann | 323 | 9.9 | |
| Liberal Democrats | Geraldine McElarney | 259 | 8.0 | |
| Green | Therese Reggio | 245 | 7.5 | |
| Liberal Democrats | Anne Peterson | 233 | 7.2 | |
| Registered electors | | 8,798 | | ▲2,078 |
| Turnout | | 3,254 | 36.99 | ▼2.47 |
| Rejected ballots | | 5 | 0.15 | ▼0.30 |
| Conservative win (new boundaries) | | | | |
| Labour win (new boundaries) | | | | |
| Conservative win (new boundaries) | | | | |

=== Barkingside ===
Barkingside (3)
| Party | Candidate | Votes | % | ±% |
|---|---|---|---|---|
| Conservative | Keith Axon* | 1,766 | 53.2 | |
| Conservative | Graham Borrott* | 1,727 | 52.0 | |
| Conservative | Roy Brunnen* | 1,716 | 51.7 | |
| Labour | Meredith Hilton | 1,135 | 34.2 | |
| Labour | Taifur Rashid | 1,017 | 30.6 | |
| Labour | Mahmood Rauf | 924 | 27.8 | |
| Liberal Democrats | Dominic Black | 372 | 11.2 | |
| Liberal Democrats | Valerie Taylor | 336 | 10.1 | |
| Liberal Democrats | James Swallow | 331 | 10.0 | |
| Registered electors | | 8,441 | | ▼1,387 |
| Turnout | | 3,324 | 39.38 | ▲2.08 |
| Rejected ballots | | 5 | 0.15 | ▼0.23 |
| Conservative win (new boundaries) | | | | |
| Conservative win (new boundaries) | | | | |
| Conservative win (new boundaries) | | | | |

=== Bridge ===
Bridge (3)
| Party | Candidate | Votes | % | ±% |
|---|---|---|---|---|
| Conservative | Claire Cooper* | 1,398 | 52.7 | |
| Conservative | James Leal | 1,373 | 51.8 | |
| Conservative | Morris Hickey* | 1,357 | 51.1 | |
| Labour | Sean Clark | 778 | 29.3 | |
| Labour | Peter Hoy | 753 | 28.4 | |
| Labour | Owen Guerin | 736 | 27.7 | |
| Liberal Democrats | David Cracknell | 411 | 15.5 | |
| Liberal Democrats | Amanda Nesbitt | 404 | 15.2 | |
| Liberal Democrats | Madeline Sinclair | 375 | 14.1 | |
| Registered electors | | 8,463 | | ▼926 |
| Turnout | | 2,661 | 31.44 | ▼3.54 |
| Rejected ballots | | 8 | 0.30 | ▼0.10 |
| Conservative win (new boundaries) | | | | |
| Conservative win (new boundaries) | | | | |
| Conservative win (new boundaries) | | | | |

=== Chadwell ===
Chadwell (3)
| Party | Candidate | Votes | % | ±% |
|---|---|---|---|---|
| Liberal Democrats | Gary Straight* | 1,386 | 52.5 | |
| Liberal Democrats | Ralph Scott* | 1,270 | 48.1 | |
| Liberal Democrats | John Tyne* | 1,240 | 47.0 | |
| Conservative | Elfyn Roberts | 900 | 34.1 | |
| Conservative | Mary Pitt | 745 | 28.2 | |
| Conservative | Pauline Highes | 742 | 28.1 | |
| Labour | Adewale Adeoshun | 469 | 17.8 | |
| Labour | Gurdial Bhamra | 456 | 17.3 | |
| Labour | Ranjit Mudhar | 441 | 16.7 | |
| Registered electors | | 8,416 | | ▼1,280 |
| Turnout | | 2,643 | 31.40 | ▼6.80 |
| Rejected ballots | | 5 | 0.19 | Steady |
| Liberal Democrats win (new boundaries) | | | | |
| Liberal Democrats win (new boundaries) | | | | |
| Liberal Democrats win (new boundaries) | | | | |

=== Church End ===
Church End (3)
| Party | Candidate | Votes | % | ±% |
|---|---|---|---|---|
| Liberal Democrats | Maureen Hoskins* | 1,448 | 55.0 | |
| Liberal Democrats | Hugh Cleaver* | 1,417 | 53.9 | |
| Liberal Democrats | Richard Hoksins* | 1,407 | 53.5 | |
| Conservative | Mark Dunn | 813 | 30.9 | |
| Conservative | Nicholas Hayes | 785 | 29.8 | |
| Conservative | Anthony Lenaghan | 731 | 27.8 | |
| Labour | Julia Hughes | 354 | 13.5 | |
| Labour | Shalab Baig | 336 | 12.8 | |
| Labour | Andrew Walker | 322 | 12.2 | |
| Registered electors | | 8,027 | | ▲49 |
| Turnout | | 2,641 | 32.90 | ▼5.02 |
| Rejected ballots | | 10 | 0.38 | ▼0.15 |
| Liberal Democrats win (new boundaries) | | | | |
| Liberal Democrats win (new boundaries) | | | | |
| Liberal Democrats win (new boundaries) | | | | |

=== Clayhall ===
Clayhall (3)
| Party | Candidate | Votes | % | ±% |
|---|---|---|---|---|
| Conservative | Alan Weinberg* | 1,831 | 56.6 | |
| Conservative | Ronald Barden* | 1,762 | 54.4 | |
| Conservative | Robert Cole | 1,754 | 54.2 | |
| Labour | Reginald Golding^{†} (Note: Golding was a sitting councillor representing the Mayfield ward) | 1,089 | 33.7 | |
| Labour | Norman Hilton | 1,045 | 32.3 | |
| Labour | Abdul Malik | 972 | 30.0 | |
| Liberal Democrats | Joan Barmby | 277 | 8.6 | |
| Liberal Democrats | Meher Khan | 263 | 8.1 | |
| Liberal Democrats | Barbara Robertson | 249 | 7.7 | |
| Registered electors | | 8,931 | | ▼1,128 |
| Turnout | | 3,243 | 36.31 | ▲4.87 |
| Rejected ballots | | 7 | 0.22 | ▼0.22 |
| Conservative win (new boundaries) | | | | |
| Conservative win (new boundaries) | | | | |
| Conservative win (new boundaries) | | | | |

=== Clementswood ===
Clementswood (3)
| Party | Candidate | Votes | % | ±% |
|---|---|---|---|---|
| Labour | Simon Green* | 1,277 | 52.4 | |
| Labour | Faiz Noor* | 1,257 | 51.6 | |
| Labour | Rajwant Mahal | 1,190 | 48.9 | |
| Conservative | Habib Rehman | 793 | 32.6 | |
| Conservative | Surendra Patel | 771 | 31.7 | |
| Conservative | Dennis Aylen | 675 | 27.7 | |
| Liberal Democrats | Helen Glanfield | 221 | 9.1 | |
| Green | Timothy Randall | 177 | 7.3 | |
| Liberal Democrats | Leslie Hutchines | 159 | 6.5 | |
| Liberal Democrats | Hazel Redshaw | 144 | 5.9 | |
| Registered electors | | 8,117 | | ▼521 |
| Turnout | | 2,443 | 30.10 | ▼4.88 |
| Rejected ballots | | 8 | 0.33 | ▼0.40 |
| Labour win (new boundaries) | | | | |
| Labour win (new boundaries) | | | | |
| Labour win (new boundaries) | | | | |

=== Cranbrook ===
Cranbrook (3)
| Party | Candidate | Votes | % | ±% |
|---|---|---|---|---|
| Conservative | Ashok Kumar | 1,448 | 46.7 | |
| Conservative | Charles Elliman* | 1,442 | 46.5 | |
| Conservative | Kathleen Pepperell | 1,359 | 43.8 | |
| Labour | Satnam Singh | 1,174 | 37.8 | |
| Labour | Joseph Hoedemaker | 1,138 | 36.7 | |
| Labour | Edmund Peake^{†} (Note: Peake was a sitting councillor representing the Hainault ward) | 1,103 | 35.6 | |
| Liberal Democrats | Saroj Sharma | 321 | 10.3 | |
| Liberal Democrats | Angela Yeoman | 295 | 9.5 | |
| Liberal Democrats | Ian Ward | 294 | 9.5 | |
| Registered electors | | 8,445 | | ▲223 |
| Turnout | | 3,111 | 36.84 | ▼4.05 |
| Rejected ballots | | 9 | 0.29 | ▼0.28 |
| Conservative win (new boundaries) | | | | |
| Conservative win (new boundaries) | | | | |
| Conservative win (new boundaries) | | | | |

=== Fairlop ===
Fairlop (3)
| Party | Candidate | Votes | % | ±% |
|---|---|---|---|---|
| Conservative | Joyce Ryan* | 1,508 | 55.8 | |
| Conservative | Lee Scott* | 1,460 | 54.1 | |
| Conservative | Glenn Corfield^{†} (Note: Corfield was a sitting councillor representing the Cranbrook ward) | 1,430 | 52.9 | |
| Labour | Ivan Corea | 780 | 28.9 | |
| Labour | Alan Taylor | 770 | 28.5 | |
| Labour | Thavathuray Jeyaranjan | 732 | 27.1 | |
| Liberal Democrats | Catherine Davies | 400 | 14.8 | |
| Liberal Democrats | Duncan Sargeant | 313 | 11.6 | |
| Liberal Democrats | Deanna Seeff | 266 | 9.8 | |
| Registered electors | | 8,190 | | ▼102 |
| Turnout | | 2,713 | 33.13 | ▼3.11 |
| Rejected ballots | | 12 | 0.44 | ▲0.04 |
| Conservative win (new boundaries) | | | | |
| Conservative win (new boundaries) | | | | |
| Conservative win (new boundaries) | | | | |

=== Fullwell ===
Fullwell (3)
| Party | Candidate | Votes | % | ±% |
|---|---|---|---|---|
| Conservative | Laurence Davies* | 1,843 | 58.8 | |
| Conservative | Alan Hughes* | 1,716 | 54.7 | |
| Conservative | Harold Moth* | 1,714 | 54.7 | |
| Labour | Gloria McHugh | 799 | 25.5 | |
| Labour | Ajit Singh | 708 | 22.6 | |
| Labour | Pahl Surinder | 681 | 21.7 | |
| Liberal Democrats | Janice Cudmore | 468 | 14.9 | |
| Liberal Democrats | Kathleen Teahan | 342 | 10.9 | |
| UKIP | Robert Selby | 280 | 8.9 | |
| Liberal Democrats | Josefa Vargas | 266 | 8.5 | |
| Registered electors | | 8,805 | | ▲139 |
| Turnout | | 3,138 | 35.64 | ▲2.91 |
| Rejected ballots | | 3 | 0.10 | ▼0.57 |
| Conservative win (new boundaries) | | | | |
| Conservative win (new boundaries) | | | | |
| Conservative win (new boundaries) | | | | |

=== Goodmayes ===
Goodmayes (3)
| Party | Candidate | Votes | % | ±% |
|---|---|---|---|---|
| Labour | Satnam Singh | 1,111 | 43.7 | |
| Labour | David Radford* | 1,089 | 42.9 | |
| Labour | Azfar Ejaz | 1,063 | 41.8 | |
| Liberal Democrats | Matthew Lake | 759 | 29.9 | |
| Liberal Democrats | Kelly Kaye | 743 | 29.2 | |
| Liberal Democrats | Naren Dattani | 706 | 27.8 | |
| Conservative | Joginder Mann | 564 | 22.2 | |
| Conservative | Asghar Kirmani | 444 | 17.5 | |
| Conservative | William Streeten | 437 | 17.2 | |
| Registered electors | | 8,380 | | ▲4,431 |
| Turnout | | 2,553 | 30.47 | ▼2.04 |
| Rejected ballots | | 12 | 0.47 | ▼0.54 |
| Labour win (new boundaries) | | | | |
| Labour win (new boundaries) | | | | |
| Labour win (new seat) | | | | |

=== Hainault ===
Hainault (3)
| Party | Candidate | Votes | % | ±% |
|---|---|---|---|---|
| Conservative | Edward Griffin | 1,035 | 36.7 | |
| Conservative | Arthur Leggatt | 984 | 34.9 | |
| Labour | Richard Newcombe* | 844 | 30.0 | |
| Conservative | John Steinberg | 820 | 29.1 | |
| Labour | Royston Emmett^{†} (Note: Royston was a sitting councillor representing the Fairlop ward) | 817 | 29.0 | |
| Labour | Lesley Hilton^{†} (Note: Hilton was a sitting councillor representing the Mayfield ward) | 771 | 27.4 | |
| BNP | Jason Douglas | 675 | 24.0 | |
| Liberal Democrats | Kathleen Black | 562 | 20.0 | |
| Liberal Democrats | Patricia Ilett | 456 | 16.2 | |
| Liberal Democrats | Ralph Stevens | 429 | 15.2 | |
| Registered electors | | 8,886 | | ▼1,883 |
| Turnout | | 2,824 | 31.78 | ▲4.76 |
| Rejected ballots | | 7 | 0.25 | ▼0.17 |
| Conservative win (new boundaries) | | | | |
| Conservative win (new boundaries) | | | | |
| Labour win (new boundaries) | | | | |

=== Loxford ===
Loxford (3)
| Party | Candidate | Votes | % | ±% |
|---|---|---|---|---|
| Labour | Muhammed Javed* | 1,471 | 55.2 | |
| Labour | Peter Laugharne^{†} (Note: Laugharne was a sitting councillor representing the Clementswood ward) | 1,301 | 48.8 | |
| Labour | Faredoon Maravala* | 1,283 | 48.1 | |
| Conservative | Bahir Chaudhry | 945 | 35.4 | |
| Conservative | Darshan Reehal | 764 | 28.7 | |
| Conservative | James Howes | 757 | 28.4 | |
| Liberal Democrats | Michelle Marsh | 304 | 11.4 | |
| Liberal Democrats | Leslie Everest | 269 | 10.1 | |
| Liberal Democrats | Nicolette Pashby | 214 | 8.0 | |
| Registered electors | | 8,846 | | ▼719 |
| Turnout | | 2,671 | 30.19 | ▼0.09 |
| Rejected ballots | | 5 | 0.19 | ▼0.95 |
| Labour win (new boundaries) | | | | |
| Labour win (new boundaries) | | | | |
| Labour win (new boundaries) | | | | |

=== Mayfield ===
Mayfield (3)
| Party | Candidate | Votes | % | ±% |
|---|---|---|---|---|
| Conservative | Mark Aaron | 1,245 | 41.1 | |
| Conservative | Geoffrey Hinds | 1,233 | 40.7 | |
| Labour | Sukhjit Sohal | 1,212 | 40.0 | |
| Labour | Ayodhiya Parkash* | 1,192 | 39.3 | |
| Labour | Tanweer Khan | 1,157 | 38.2 | |
| Conservative | Matthew Pether | 1,151 | 38.0 | |
| Liberal Democrats | Ian Gravenell | 383 | 12.6 | |
| Liberal Democrats | Frank Marsh | 342 | 11.3 | |
| Liberal Democrats | Edwin Potkins | 309 | 10.2 | |
| Green | Jane Wild | 248 | 8.2 | |
| Registered electors | | 8,767 | | ▼504 |
| Turnout | | 3,034 | 34.61 | ▲0.06 |
| Rejected ballots | | 3 | 0.10 | ▼0.27 |
| Conservative win (new boundaries) | | | | |
| Conservative win (new boundaries) | | | | |
| Labour win (new boundaries) | | | | |

=== Monkhams ===
Monkhams (3)
| Party | Candidate | Votes | % | ±% |
|---|---|---|---|---|
| Conservative | Linda Huggett* | 1,881 | 60.1 | |
| Conservative | Michael Stark* | 1,852 | 59.2 | |
| Conservative | James O'Shea* | 1,841 | 58.9 | |
| Liberal Democrats | Michael McElarney | 859 | 27.5 | |
| Liberal Democrats | Florence Boyland | 855 | 27.3 | |
| Liberal Democrats | Geoffrey Seeff | 828 | 26.5 | |
| Labour | Gerald Elvin | 343 | 11.0 | |
| Labour | David Pearce | 322 | 10.3 | |
| Labour | Claudius Pascal | 320 | 10.2 | |
| Registered electors | | 8,243 | | ▲30 |
| Turnout | | 3,130 | 37.97 | ▲1.02 |
| Rejected ballots | | 2 | 0.06 | ▼0.30 |
| Conservative win (new boundaries) | | | | |
| Conservative win (new boundaries) | | | | |
| Conservative win (new boundaries) | | | | |

=== Newbury ===
Newbury (3)
| Party | Candidate | Votes | % | ±% |
|---|---|---|---|---|
| Labour | Dev Sharma* | 1,555 | 50.2 | |
| Labour | Alexander Hilton | 1,488 | 48.0 | |
| Labour | Kenneth Turner^{†} (Note: Turner was a sitting councillor representing the Aldborough ward) | 1,452 | 46.9 | |
| Conservative | Timothy Downes | 984 | 31.8 | |
| Conservative | Narain Kaul | 941 | 30.4 | |
| Conservative | Darshan Sunger | 940 | 30.4 | |
| Liberal Democrats | Nicola Sinclair | 390 | 12.6 | |
| Liberal Democrats | Edward McElarney | 375 | 12.1 | |
| Liberal Democrats | Pamela Tyne | 352 | 11.4 | |
| Registered electors | | 9,562 | | ▲1,044 |
| Turnout | | 3,111 | 32.54 | ▼3.06 |
| Rejected ballots | | 15 | 0.48 | ▼0.74 |
| Labour win (new boundaries) | | | | |
| Labour win (new boundaries) | | | | |
| Labour win (new boundaries) | | | | |

=== Roding ===
Roding (3)
| Party | Candidate | Votes | % | ±% |
|---|---|---|---|---|
| Liberal Democrats | Ian Bond* | 1,546 | 54.2 | |
| Liberal Democrats | Felicity Banks* | 1,518 | 53.2 | |
| Liberal Democrats | Anthony Boyland* | 1,450 | 50.8 | |
| Conservative | Anthony Loffhagen | 693 | 24.3 | |
| Conservative | Sonia MacDonald | 689 | 24.1 | |
| Conservative | Joyce Bassom | 664 | 23.3 | |
| Labour | Martin Chew | 386 | 13.5 | |
| Labour | Hafiz Majid | 348 | 12.2 | |
| Labour | Marioara Stitchman | 334 | 11.7 | |
| BNP | Anthony Young | 309 | 10.8 | |
| Registered electors | | 8,113 | | ▼569 |
| Turnout | | 2,862 | 35.28 | ▼4.39 |
| Rejected ballots | | 7 | 0.24 | ▼0.05 |
| Liberal Democrats win (new boundaries) | | | | |
| Liberal Democrats win (new boundaries) | | | | |
| Liberal Democrats win (new boundaries) | | | | |

=== Seven Kings ===
Seven Kings (3)
| Party | Candidate | Votes | % | ±% |
|---|---|---|---|---|
| Labour | Harold Bellwood | 1,331 | 47.7 | |
| Labour | Robert Littlewood* | 1,234 | 44.2 | |
| Labour | Maganbhai Patel* | 1,209 | 43.3 | |
| Conservative | Munawar Gilani | 894 | 32.0 | |
| Conservative | Colm Nolan | 863 | 30.9 | |
| Conservative | Zubeda Quddos | 781 | 28.0 | |
| Liberal Democrats | David Channon | 508 | 18.2 | |
| Liberal Democrats | Walter Staight | 434 | 15.5 | |
| Liberal Democrats | Ram Sharma | 388 | 13.9 | |
| Registered electors | | 8,986 | | ▼1,148 |
| Turnout | | 2,794 | 31.09 | ▼4.15 |
| Rejected ballots | | 1 | 0.04 | ▼0.61 |
| Labour win (new boundaries) | | | | |
| Labour win (new boundaries) | | | | |
| Labour win (new boundaries) | | | | |

=== Snaresbrook ===
Snaresbrook (3)
| Party | Candidate | Votes | % | ±% |
|---|---|---|---|---|
| Conservative | Suzanne Nolan* | 1,643 | 45.2 | |
| Conservative | Peter Goody* | 1,626 | 44.7 | |
| Conservative | Christopher Cummins | 1,588 | 43.7 | |
| Labour | Gregor Eglin* | 1,496 | 41.1 | |
| Labour | Lanna Childs | 1,430 | 39.3 | |
| Labour | Jagdev Purewal | 1,289 | 35.4 | |
| Liberal Democrats | John Swallow | 384 | 10.6 | |
| Green | Ashley Gunstock | 368 | 10.1 | |
| Liberal Democrats | Christina Bradd | 342 | 9.4 | |
| Liberal Democrats | Pamela Winbourne | 340 | 9.3 | |
| Registered electors | | 8,904 | | ▲976 |
| Turnout | | 3,647 | 40.96 | ▼0.01 |
| Rejected ballots | | 10 | 0.27 | ▲0.15 |
| Conservative win (new boundaries) | | | | |
| Conservative win (new boundaries) | | | | |
| Conservative win (new boundaries) | | | | |

=== Valentines ===
Valentines (3)
| Party | Candidate | Votes | % | ±% |
|---|---|---|---|---|
| Labour | Elaine Norman* | 1,069 | 42.9 | |
| Labour | Gary Scottow | 1,041 | 41.8 | |
| Labour | Virendra Tewari* | 1,012 | 40.6 | |
| Conservative | Raja Khan | 847 | 34.0 | |
| Conservative | Zahoor Qurashi | 805 | 32.3 | |
| Conservative | Gordon Moser | 727 | 29.2 | |
| Liberal Democrats | George Hogarth | 402 | 16.1 | |
| Liberal Democrats | Iona Anderson | 399 | 16.0 | |
| Liberal Democrats | Susan Hamlyn | 331 | 13.3 | |
| Green | Clive Durdle | 279 | 11.2 | |
| Registered electors | | 8,832 | | ▲1,272 |
| Turnout | | 2,501 | 28.32 | ▼0.74 |
| Rejected ballots | | 9 | 0.36 | ▼0.10 |
| Labour win (new boundaries) | | | | |
| Labour win (new boundaries) | | | | |
| Labour win (new boundaries) | | | | |

=== Wanstead ===
Wanstead (3)
| Party | Candidate | Votes | % | ±% |
|---|---|---|---|---|
| Conservative | Allan Burgess* | 1,895 | 51.3 | |
| Conservative | Michelle Dunn | 1,697 | 46.0 | |
| Conservative | Aaron Powell | 1,609 | 43.6 | |
| Labour | Ciaran Clerkin | 1,346 | 36.5 | |
| Labour | Jeffrey Edelman* | 1,313 | 35.6 | |
| Labour | Kamal Qureshi | 1,091 | 29.6 | |
| Liberal Democrats | Alan Cornish | 455 | 12.3 | |
| Liberal Democrats | Janet Cornish | 451 | 12.2 | |
| Green | Louise Gunstock | 423 | 11.5 | |
| Liberal Democrats | Christopher Lawrence | 366 | 9.9 | |
| Registered electors | | 8,708 | | ▲850 |
| Turnout | | 3,698 | 42.47 | ▼0.01 |
| Rejected ballots | | 6 | 0.16 | ▼0.14 |
| Conservative win (new boundaries) | | | | |
| Conservative win (new boundaries) | | | | |
| Conservative win (new boundaries) | | | | |

== By-elections ==
Newbury by-election, 11 July 2002
| Party | Candidate | Votes | % | ±% |
|---|---|---|---|---|
| Labour | Dev Sharma | 1,356 | 47.2 | |
| Conservative | Surenda Patel | 1,313 | 45.7 | |
| CPA | Juliet Hawkins | 206 | 7.2 | |
| Majority | | 43 | 1.5 | |
| Turnout | | 2,875 | 30.0 | |
| Labour hold | | | | |

This election was called following the disqualification of Cllr. Dev Sharma as his job made him ineligible to run without permission from a government adjudicator. To run in this election he resigned from the job that required him to get permission to run for a council seat.

Barkingside by-election, 10 April 2003
| Party | Candidate | Votes | % | ±% |
|---|---|---|---|---|
| Conservative | Keith Prince | 1,468 | 48.9 | |
| Labour | Taifur Rashid | 985 | 32.8 | |
| Liberal Democrats | Matthew Lake | 341 | 11.3 | |
| BNP | Julian Leppert | 116 | 3.9 | |
| CPA | James Hargreaves | 56 | 1.9 | |
| Independent | Martin Levin | 39 | 1.3 | |
| Majority | | 483 | 16.1 | |
| Turnout | | 3,005 | 35.2 | |
| Conservative hold | | | | |

This election was called following the death of Cllr. Keith E. Axon.

Valentines by-election, 24 July 2003
| Party | Candidate | Votes | % | ±% |
|---|---|---|---|---|
| Conservative | Suresh Kumar | 1,006 | 37.5 | |
| Labour | Lesley Hilton | 997 | 37.2 | |
| Liberal Democrats | George Hogarth | 422 | 15.7 | |
| CPA | Juliet Hawkins | 171 | 6.4 | |
| Green | Ashley Gunstock | 86 | 3.2 | |
| Majority | | 9 | 0.3 | |
| Turnout | | 2,682 | 29.8 | |
| Conservative gain from Labour | | | | |

This election was called following the death of Cllr. Gary D. Scottow.
