= Goodmayes (ward) =

Electoral division in the London Borough of Redbridge

- Electoral ward for the Redbridge London Borough Council
- Goodmayes ward boundaries since 2018
- Borough: Redbridge
- County: Greater London
- Population: 15,259 (2021)
- Electorate: 9,879 (2022)
- Area: 1.782 square kilometres (0.688 sq mi)

Current electoral ward
- Created: 1965
- Number of members: 1965–1994: 3; 1994–2002: 2; 2002–present: 3
- Councillors: Kam Rai; Namreen Chaudry; Neil Zammett
- GSS code: E05000505 (2002–2018); E05011244 (since 2018)

Goodmayes is an electoral ward in the London Borough of Redbridge. It is based on the Goodmayes area of Ilford. The ward has existed since the creation of the borough on 1 April 1965 and was first used in the 1964 elections. It returns councillors to Redbridge London Borough Council.

The ward has almost always returned Labour councillors, the only exception being 1968 when one Conservative councillor was elected alongside two Labour ones. (Note: The 1968 London local elections were especially bad for Labour.)

== Redbridge council elections since 2018 ==
There was a revision of ward boundaries in Redbridge in 2018. Goodmayes gained territory between High Road and the London–Shenfield railway line to the north that had been part of the Seven Kings ward.

=== 2022 election ===
The election took place on 5 May 2022.

2022 Redbridge London Borough Council election: Goodmayes (3)
Party	Candidate	Votes	%	±%
Labour	Namreen Chaudry	1,747	70.6	▼3.5
Labour	Kam Rai	1,711	69.1	▼2.2
Labour	Neil Zammett	1,601	64.7	▼4.5
Conservative	Shazia Anjum	552	22.3	▲1.0
Conservative	Dwendoline Dodkins	538	21.7	▲1.6
Conservative	Fazle Elahi	465	18.8	▼1.1
Turnout		2,475	25.1	▼7.8
Labour hold				
Labour hold				
Labour hold				

=== 2018 election ===
The election took place on 3 May 2018.

2018 Redbridge London Borough Council election: Goodmayes (3)
Party	Candidate	Votes	%	±%
Labour	Namreen Chaudhry	2,422	74.09	N/A
Labour	Kam Rai	2,329	71.25	N/A
Labour	Neil Zammett	2,260	69.13	N/A
Conservative	Maureen Patricia	696	21.29	N/A
Conservative	Alice Pastides	658	20.13	N/A
Conservative	Rash Mahal	650	19.88	N/A
Turnout		3,269	32.90	
Labour win (new boundaries)				
Labour win (new boundaries)				
Labour win (new boundaries)				

== 2002–2018 Redbridge council elections ==
Goodmayes ward boundaries from 2002 to 2018

There was a revision of ward boundaries in Redbridge in 2002. Councillors representing Goodmayes increased from two to three.

=== 2014 election ===
The election took place on 22 May 2014.

2014 Redbridge London Borough Council election: Goodmayes (3)
Party	Candidate	Votes	%	±%
Labour	Bert Jones	2,347		
Labour	Kam Rai	2,272		
Labour	Barbara White	2,201		
Conservative	Mohammed Asif	1,145		
Conservative	Pradip Solanki	855		
Conservative	Arvind Bhadresa	798		
Liberal Democrats	Tariq Bin Aziz	553		
Green	Kevin Page	368		
Turnout				
Labour hold		Swing		
Labour hold		Swing		
Labour hold		Swing		

=== 2010 election ===
The election on 6 May 2010 took place on the same day as the United Kingdom general election.

2010 Redbridge London Borough Council election: Goodmayes (3)
Party	Candidate	Votes	%	±%
Labour	Bert Jones	2,504		
Labour	Ali Hai	2,452		
Labour	Barbara White	2,285		
Liberal Democrats	Satnam Singh	1,485		
Conservative	Mosheraf Ashraf	1,324		
Conservative	Savita Sharma	1,320		
Liberal Democrats	Azfar Ejaz	1,285		
Liberal Democrats	Jesse Boucher	1,261		
Conservative	Alicja Borkowska	1,158		
Turnout			58.59	+22.79
Labour hold		Swing		
Labour hold		Swing		
Labour hold		Swing		

=== 2006 election ===
The election took place on 4 May 2006.

2006 Redbridge London Borough Council election: Goodmayes (3)
Party	Candidate	Votes	%	±%
Labour	Satnam Singh	1,420	46.1	
Labour	Vinaya Sharma	1,392		
Labour	David Radford	1,362		
Liberal Democrats	Azfar Ejaz	938	30.5	
Liberal Democrats	Timothy Hogan	843		
Liberal Democrats	Narendra Dattani	774		
Conservative	Pauline Hughes	719	23.4	
Conservative	William Madge	625		
Conservative	William Streeten	574		
Turnout			35.8	
Labour hold		Swing		
Labour hold		Swing		
Labour hold		Swing		

=== 2002 election ===
The election took place on 2 May 2002.

2002 Redbridge London Borough Council election: Goodmayes (3)
Party	Candidate	Votes	%	±%
Labour	Satnam Singh	1,111	16.0	
Labour	David Radford	1,089	15.7	
Labour	Azfar Ejaz	1,063	15.3	
Liberal Democrats	Matthew Lake	759	10.9	
Liberal Democrats	Kelly Kaye	743	10.7	
Liberal Democrats	Naren Dattani	706	10.2	
Conservative	Joginder Mann	564	8.1	
Conservative	Asghar Kirmani	444	6.4	
Conservative	William Streeten	437	6.3	
Total votes		6,916	100	
Turnout			30.5	
Labour win (new boundaries)				
Labour win (new boundaries)				
Labour win (new boundaries)				

== 1994–2002 Redbridge council elections ==
The ward was adjusted on 1 April 1994 when the part of the Becontree estate in Redbridge was transferred to the new ward of Becontree in the London Borough of Barking and Dagenham. The transfer united the whole of the estate in Barking and Dagenham. The adjustment transferred sufficient population out of the borough to require a decrease from three to two councillors representing the Goodmayes ward. Realignment of the boundary with Barking and Dagenham to Burnside Road brought a small part of Triptons ward into Goodmayes.

=== 1998 election ===
The election took place on 7 May 1998.

1998 Redbridge London Borough Council election: Goodmayes (2)
Party	Candidate	Votes	%	±%
Labour	Sidney Middleburgh	643		
Labour	David Radford	588		
Conservative	Keith Langford	369		
Conservative	Shahlab Baig	324		
Liberal Democrats	Frank Marsh	233		
Liberal Democrats	Narendra Dattani	193		
Majority				
Turnout				
Labour hold		Swing		
Labour hold		Swing		

=== 1994 election ===
The election took place on 5 May 1994.

1994 Redbridge London Borough Council election: Goodmayes (2)
Party	Candidate	Votes	%	±%
Labour	Reginald Golding	827	46.09	▼9.97
Labour	Sidney Middleburgh	813		
Conservative	Ruth Kinzley	622	34.74	▲7.07
Conservative	Shahlab Baig	613		
Liberal Democrats	Alexander McLean	197	11.02	▲3.66
Liberal Democrats	Richard Torney	195		
BNP	Paul Bixby	145	8.15	New
Registered electors		3,458		▼5,028
Turnout		1,848	53.44	▲11.93
Rejected ballots		2	0.11	Steady
Labour win (new boundaries)				
Labour win (new boundaries)				

== 1978–1994 Redbridge council elections ==
Goodmayes ward boundaries from 1978 to 1994

There was a revision of ward boundaries in Redbridge in 1978.

=== 1990 election ===
The election took place on 3 May 1990.

1990 Redbridge London Borough Council election: Goodmayes (3)
Party	Candidate	Votes	%	±%
Labour	John Fairley-Churchill	2,132	56.06	
Labour Co-op	Michael Fitzmaurice	1,889		
Labour Co-op	Paul Jeater	1,833		
Conservative	John Atkins	985	27.67	
Conservative	Raymond Haines	961		
Conservative	Thomas Merryweather	942		
Green	Leo Fletcher	310	8.91	
Liberal Democrats	Eileen Clark	270	7.36	
Liberal Democrats	Philip Clark	266		
Liberal Democrats	Amelia Olive	233		
Registered electors		8,486		
Turnout		3,511	41.37	
Rejected ballots		4	0.11	
Labour hold		Swing		
Labour Co-op hold		Swing		
Labour Co-op hold		Swing		

=== 1986 election ===
The election took place on 8 May 1986.

=== 1982 election ===
The election took place on 6 May 1982.

=== 1980 by-election ===
The election took place on 6 November 1980, following the resignation of Peter Duncan.

1980 Goodmayes by-election
Party	Candidate	Votes	%	±%
Labour	Christina Cooper	1,480		
Conservative	Gillian Howes	537		
Liberal	Robert McLachlan	213		
Turnout				
Labour hold		Swing		

=== 1978 election ===
The election took place on 4 May 1978.

== 1964–1978 Redbridge council elections ==
External image
- Map showing Goodmayes ward boundaries from 1965 to 1978

=== 1974 election ===
The election took place on 2 May 1974.

=== 1971 election ===
The election took place on 13 May 1971.

=== 1970 by-election ===
The by-election took place on 9 April 1970.

1970 Goodmayes by-election
Party	Candidate	Votes	%	±%
Labour	T. Reynolds	1,807		
Conservative	B. Gunby	738		
Liberal	J. Stonham	123		
National Front	R. Tear	102		
Majority				
Turnout				
Labour hold		Swing		

=== 1968 election ===
The election took place on 9 May 1968.

1968 Redbridge London Borough Council election: Goodmayes (3)
Party	Candidate	Votes	%	±%
Labour	A. Carradice	1,189		
Labour	F. Watts	1,106		
Conservative	A. Dixon	1,091		
Labour	T. Reynolds	1068		
Conservative	G. Brindley	1017		
Conservative	J. Howes	968		
Liberal	C. Morrison	278		
Liberal	J. Stonham	251		
Liberal	A. Yates	242		
Communist	E. Radley	142		
Turnout				
Labour hold		Swing		
Labour hold		Swing		
Conservative gain from Labour		Swing		

=== 1964 election ===
The election took place on 7 May 1964.

1964 Redbridge London Borough Council election: Goodmayes (3)
Party	Candidate	Votes	%	±%
Labour	D. Davies	1,772		
Labour	A. Clack	1,732		
Labour	J. Westerbury	1,649		
Conservative	D. Revington	765		
Conservative	A. Dixon	745		
Conservative	N. Thorne	733		
Liberal	E. Bowhil	317		
Liberal	P. Ritchie	315		
Liberal	B. Boon	289		
Communist	P. Ritchie	102		
Turnout				
Labour win (new seat)				
Labour win (new seat)				
Labour win (new seat)				
