= Cranbrook (ward) =

Electoral ward in Redbridge, London

- Electoral ward for the Redbridge London Borough Council
- Cranbrook ward boundaries since 2018
- Borough: Redbridge
- County: Greater London
- Population: 13,238 (2021)
- Electorate: 9,376 (2022)
- Area: 2.295 square kilometres (0.886 sq mi)

Current electoral ward
- Created: 1965
- Number of members: 1965–1978: 4; 1978–present: 3
- Councillors: Chaudhary Ahmed; Syed Islam; Saira Jamil
- GSS code: E05011241 (2002–2018); E05011241 (since 2018)

Cranbrook is an electoral ward in the London Borough of Redbridge. The ward has existed since the creation of the borough on 1 April 1965 and was first used in the 1964 elections. It returns councillors to Redbridge London Borough Council.

== Redbridge council elections since 2018 ==
There was a revision of ward boundaries in Redbridge in 2018.

=== 2026 election ===
The election took place on 7 May 2026.

2026 Redbridge London Borough Council election: Cranbrook
Party	Candidate	Votes	%	±%
Redbridge Ind.	Feza Haque	1200	31.6	N/A
Labour	Chaudhary Ahmed	1143	30.1	−33.3
Redbridge Ind.	Mohamed Haleemdeen	1088	28.6	N/A
Labour	Saira Jamil*	935	24.6	−34.9
Redbridge Ind.	Tahreem Noor	911	24.0	N/A
Labour	Syed Islam*	898	23.6	−33.6
Independent	Mohammed Asif	718	18.9	N/A
Green	Vissen Limbeea	651	17.1	N/A
Conservative	Rambabu Siripurapu	626	16.5	−12.9
Conservative	Chiranjeev Verma	619	16.3	−12.5
Conservative	Nicole Maccari	610	16.1	−12.3
Independent	Surinder Pahl	280	7.4	N/A
Reform	Steven Kraft	273	7.2	N/A
Reform	Patricia Steel	264	6.9	N/A
Liberal Democrats	Grace Jacob	239	6.3	N/A
Turnout		3800	38.52	+9.12
Redbridge Ind. gain from Labour		Swing		
Labour hold		Swing		
Redbridge Ind. gain from Labour		Swing		

=== 2022 election ===
The election took place on 5 May 2022.

2022 Redbridge London Borough Council election: Cranbrook
Party	Candidate	Votes	%	±%
Labour	Chaudhary Ahmed	1,746	63.4	▲3.1
Labour	Syed Islam	1,574	57.2	▼0.3
Labour	Saira Jamil	1,638	59.5	▲5.9
Conservative	Mosheraf Ashraf	809	29.4	▼14.5
Conservative	Abrar Khan	793	28.8	▼4.5
Conservative	Ekam Sehmbi	781	28.4	▼4.9
Ind. Network	Fathima Shukry	323	11.7	New
Turnout		2,754	29.4	▼12.4
Labour hold		Swing		
Labour hold		Swing		
Labour hold		Swing		

=== 2018 election ===
The election took place on 3 May 2018.

2018 Redbridge London Borough Council election: Cranbrook
Party	Candidate	Votes	%	±%
Labour	Chaudhary Ahmed	2,350	60.26	N/A
Labour	Syeda Ali	2,218	56.87	N/A
Labour	Varinder Bola	2,089	53.56	N/A
Conservative	Matthew Chaudhary	1,711	43.87	N/A
Conservative	David Rome	1,298	33.28	N/A
Conservative	Richard Firmstone	1,297	33.26	N/A
Turnout		3,900	41.77	
Labour win (new boundaries)				
Labour win (new boundaries)				
Labour win (new boundaries)				

== 2002–2018 Redbridge council elections ==
There was a revision of ward boundaries in Redbridge in 2002.

=== 2010 election ===
The election on 6 May 2010 took place on the same day as the United Kingdom general election.

=== 2008 by-election ===
The by-election took place on 10 July 2008, following the death of Charles Elliman.

2008 Cranbrook by-election
Party	Candidate	Votes	%	±%
Conservative	Matthew Chaudhary	1,625	60.0	+7.7
Labour	Barbara White	729	27.0	−4.5
Liberal Democrats	Helen A. Duffett	318	11.7	−4.5
BNP	Anthony Young	37	1.3	+1.3
Majority		896	33.0	
Turnout		2,709	30.0	
Conservative hold		Swing		

== 1978–2002 Redbridge council elections ==
=== 1998 election ===
The election took place on 7 May 1998.

=== 1994 election ===
The election took place on 5 May 1994.

=== 1993 by-election ===
The election took place on 20 May 1993, following the death of Arnold Kinzley.

1993 Cranbrook by-election
Party	Candidate	Votes	%	±%
Conservative	Keith Langford	1,122	36.5	
Labour	Joseph Hoedemaker	1,098	35.8	
Liberal Democrats	George Hogarth	851	27.7	
Turnout			40.2	
Conservative hold		Swing		

=== 1990 election ===
The election took place on 3 May 1990.

=== 1986 election ===
The election took place on 8 May 1986.

=== 1982 election ===
The election took place on 6 May 1982.

=== 1978 election ===
The election took place on 4 May 1978.

== 1964–1978 Redbridge council elections ==
=== 1968 election ===
The election took place on 9 May 1968.

1968 Redbridge London Borough Council election: Cranbrook (4)
Party	Candidate	Votes	%	±%
Conservative	I. Natzler	3,104		
Conservative	B. Adams	3,038		
Conservative	M. Paige	3,022		
Conservative	D. Westley	2,962		
Liberal	R. Newland	882		
Liberal	A. Manwaring	816		
Liberal	G. Wilson	805		
Liberal	G. Stone	745		
Labour	A. Barr	393		
Labour	F. Land	380		
Labour	R. Chatten	369		
Labour	E. Prent	369		
Turnout				
Conservative hold		Swing		
Conservative hold		Swing		
Conservative hold		Swing		
Conservative hold		Swing		

=== 1964 election ===
The election took place on 7 May 1964.

1964 Redbridge London Borough Council election: Cranbrook (4)
Party	Candidate	Votes	%	±%
Conservative	F. James	2,468		
Conservative	I. Natzler	2,437		
Conservative	F. Pearson	2,411		
Conservative	M. Paige	2,405		
Liberal	F. Grant	1,129		
Liberal	R. Newland	1,123		
Liberal	G. Wilson	1,115		
Liberal	E. Alms	1,055		
Labour	N. Young	569		
Labour	C. Soley	564		
Labour	M. Zeital	559		
Labour	G. Mountney	556		
Turnout		4,106	34.8	
Conservative win (new seat)				
Conservative win (new seat)				
Conservative win (new seat)				
Conservative win (new seat)				
