= Roding (ward) =

Electoral division in north-east London

- Former electoral ward for the Redbridge London Borough Council
- Roding ward boundaries from 2002 to 2018
- Borough: Redbridge
- County: Greater London

Former electoral ward
- Created: 1978
- Abolished: 2018
- Replaced by: Bridge, Clayhall, Fullwell, South Woodford
- ONS code: 00BCGQ (2002–2018)
- GSS code: E05000511 (2002–2018)

Roding was an electoral ward in the London Borough of Redbridge from 1978 to 2018. The ward was first used in the 1978 elections and last used for the 2014 elections. It returned three councillors to Redbridge London Borough Council.

== 2002–2018 Redbridge council elections ==
There were revisions of ward boundaries in Redbridge in 2002, and in 2018.

=== 2016 by-election ===
The by-election took place on 5 May 2016, following the resignation of Sarah Blaber.

2016 Roding by-election
Party	Candidate	Votes	%	±%
Labour	Lloyd Duddridge	1,832	40.9	+17.5
Conservative	Ruth Clark	1,254	28.0	+2.8
Liberal Democrats	Richard Clare	983	22.0	−6.3
UKIP	Jonathon Seymour	216	4.8	−9.6
Green	Barry Cooper	169	3.8	−4.8
All People's Party	Marilyn Moore	22	0.5	+0.5
Majority		578		
Turnout		4,515	52.4%	+11.8
Labour gain from Conservative		Swing		

=== 2014 election ===
The election took place on 22 May 2014.

Party	Candidate	Votes	%	±%
Liberal Democrats	Ian Bond*	1,181	32.5	
Liberal Democrats	Gwyneth Deakins*	1,162	32.0	
Conservative	Sarah Blaber	1,053	29.0	
Liberal Democrats	Michael Teahan	980	27.0	
Conservative	Ben Caine	980	27.0	
Labour	Joe Barnard	977	26.9	
Labour	Mohammed Noor	810	22.3	
Conservative	Prerna Sian	809	22.2	
Labour	Rahman Sidique	786	21.6	
UKIP	Chris Thurston	602	16.6	
Green	Susanne Marshall	359	9.9	
Turnout		3,636	40.6	
Liberal Democrats hold		Swing		
Liberal Democrats hold		Swing		
Conservative gain from Liberal Democrats		Swing		

=== 2010 election ===
The election on 6 May 2010 took place on the same day as the United Kingdom general election.

2010 Redbridge London Borough Council election: Roding
Party	Candidate	Votes	%	±%
Liberal Democrats	Felicity Banks*	2,260		
Liberal Democrats	Ian Bond*	2,110		
Liberal Democrats	Gwyneth Deakins	2,025		
Conservative	Tony Loffhagen	1,852		
Conservative	Melvyn Marks	1,811		
Conservative	Lisa Morgan	1,713		
Labour	Imtiaz Ahmed	1,234		
Labour	Wes Streeting	1,145		
Labour	Neelum Naqvi	1,107		
BNP	John Hughes	326		
Turnout			64.8	+24.8
Liberal Democrats hold		Swing		
Liberal Democrats hold		Swing		
Liberal Democrats hold		Swing		

=== 2006 election ===
The election took place on 4 May 2006.

2006 Redbridge London Borough Council election: Roding
Party	Candidate	Votes	%	±%
Liberal Democrats	Ian Bond*	1,531	43.1	
Liberal Democrats	Felicity Banks*	1,527		
Liberal Democrats	Farrukh Islam	1,163		
Conservative	Anthony Loffhagen	1,151	32.4	
Conservative	Martin Levin	1,136		
Conservative	Samuel Morgan	962		
Green	Terence Stokes	453	12.7	
Labour	Anne Mallach	420	11.8	
Labour	Mary Tuffin	414		
Labour	Richard Wilkins	388		
Turnout			40.0	
Liberal Democrats hold		Swing		
Liberal Democrats hold		Swing		
Liberal Democrats hold		Swing		

=== 2002 election ===
The election took place on 2 May 2002.

2002 Redbridge London Borough Council election: Roding
Party	Candidate	Votes	%
Liberal Democrats	Ian Bond*	1,546	52.8
Liberal Democrats	Felicity Banks*	1,518	
Liberal Democrats	Anthony Boyland*	1,450	
Conservative	Anthony Loffhagen	693	23.9
Conservative	Sonia MacDonald	689	
Conservative	Joyce Bassom	664	
Labour	Martin Chew	386	12.5
Labour	Hafiz Majid	348	
Labour	Marioara Stitchman	334	
BNP	Anthony Young	309	10.8
Total votes		7,937	100
Turnout			32.9
Liberal Democrats win (new boundaries)			
Liberal Democrats win (new boundaries)			
Liberal Democrats win (new boundaries)			

== 1978–2002 Redbridge council elections ==
Roding ward boundaries from 1978 to 2002

=== 1998 election ===
Roding
Party	Candidate	Votes	%	±%
Liberal Democrats	Ian Bond*	1,776	51.70	▼4.78
Liberal Democrats	Felicity Banks	1,721		
Liberal Democrats	Anthony Boyland	1,664		
Conservative	Anthony Loffhagen	964	28.05	▼2.28
Conservative	Paul Chapman	951		
Conservative	Fatema Hussain	885		
Labour	Henry Garratt	582	17.24	▲4.68
Labour	John Cullen	574		
Labour	Martin Chew	565		
Independent	Martin Levin	100	3.01	New
Registered electors		8,682		▲572
Turnout		3,444	39.67	▼13.67
Rejected ballots		10	0.29	▲0.04
Liberal Democrats hold				
Liberal Democrats hold				
Liberal Democrats hold				

=== 1994 election ===
Roding
Party	Candidate	Votes	%	±%
Liberal Democrats	Ian Bond	2,369	56.48	▲31.99
Liberal Democrats	Christina Bradd	2,310		
Liberal Democrats	Gareth Wilson	2,210		
Conservative	Anthony Loffhagen*	1,267	30.33	▼17.58
Conservative	Hazel Weinberg*	1,230		
Conservative	Reginald Woda*	1,201		
Labour	John Cullen	503	11.56	▼4.82
Labour	Ian Gardiner	464		
Labour	Mary Tuffin	443		
Communist	Laurence Laughlin	66	1.62	▼0.28
Registered electors		8,110		▲59
Turnout		4,326	53.34	▲4.15
Rejected ballots		11	0.25	▲0.02
Liberal Democrats gain from Conservative				
Liberal Democrats gain from Conservative				
Liberal Democrats gain from Conservative				

=== 1990 election ===
The election took place on 3 May 1990.

Roding
Party	Candidate	Votes	%
Conservative	Anthony Loffhagen*	1,968	47.91
Conservative	Hazel Weinberg	1,959	
Conservative	Reginald Woda	1,890	
Lib Dem Focus Team	Anne Shortell	1,015	24.49
Lib Dem Focus Team	Gareth Wilson	1,010	
Lib Dem Focus Team	John Swallow	949	
Labour	Henry Garratt	721	16.38
Labour	Ian Peacock	686	
Labour	Manubhai Patel	582	
Green	Tracey Read	377	9.32
Communist	Laurence Laughlin	77	1.90
Registered electors		8,051	
Turnout		3,960	49.19
Rejected ballots		9	0.23
Conservative hold			
Conservative hold			
Conservative hold			

=== 1987 by-election ===
The by-election took place on 28 May 1987, following the death of Denis Stephens.

1987 Roding by-election
Party	Candidate	Votes	%	±%
Conservative	Hazel Weinberg	2,459		
Liberal-SDP Alliance	Richard Hoskins	1,462		
Labour	Paul Davies	364		
Communist	Laurence Laughlin	35		
Turnout				
Conservative hold		Swing		
