= Redbridge Independents =

British political party

- Ideology: Localism
- Political position: Big tent
- Redbridge London Borough Council: 9 / 63

Website
- redbridgeindys.org

Redbridge Independents is a local political party established in 2024 and based in the London Borough of Redbridge. It has representation of nine councillors on Redbridge London Borough Council.

The party is registered with the Electoral Commission as Redbridge Independents, but also uses Redbridge and Ilford Independents and Ilford and Redbridge Independents in its political emblems.
