= Hainault =

Hainault (/ˈheɪnɔːt/, /-ɒlt/) may refer to:

- An older spelling for the County of Hainaut (across the border of modern-day Belgium and France)
- Hainault, London, a suburban area of London, UK
- Hainault Bulldogs, a rugby league team, Dagenham, Essex
- Hainault Depot, on the London Underground Central line
- Hainault Forest, a country park in London
- Hainault Forest High School, former name of The Forest Academy, London
- Hainault Lodge, a nature reserve in London
- Fairlop Loop, a branch line of the former Great Eastern Railway, London, now a portion of the Hainault Loop on the London Underground Central line
- Hainault tube station, station on the London Underground Central line

== See also ==
- Hainau (disambiguation)
- Hainaut (disambiguation)
- Henao
