= Hainaut =

Hainaut (French pronunciation: [ɛno]) may refer to:

- County of Hainaut, a historical Holy Roman Empire lordship in modern-day Belgium and northern France
- French Hainaut, a part of the modern Nord department
- Hainaut Province, a modern Belgian province, part of Wallonia
- Hainaut-Sambre, a former Belgian steel conglomerate

== See also ==
- Hainau (disambiguation)
- Hainault (disambiguation)
- Henao, the Spanish name for the region, now also used as a surname
