= The Forest Academy =

Coordinates: 51°36′30.9″N 0°6′59.8″E

Location
- Harbourer Road; Redbridge, Greater London, IG6 3TN; England

Information
- Type: Academy
- Motto: Together Fostering Achievement
- Established: 1951
- Local authority: Redbridge
- Trust: Beacon Multi-Academy Trust
- Department for Education URN: 137692 Tables
- Ofsted: Reports
- Executive headteacher: Will Mackintosh
- Principal: Will Mackintosh
- Staff: 100+
- Gender: Coeducational
- Age range: 11 to 18
- Enrolment: 650 plus c. 250 in the 6th form
- Colours: Black, Navy Blue and Green
- Website: www.theforestacademy.org

The Forest Academy (formerly Hainault Forest High School) is a coeducational secondary school near Hainault Forest in Hainault, London, England. The school is an academy sponsored by Beacon multi-academy trust. The Forest Academy is an Ofsted 'Good' school.

Forest Academy has a co-located sixth form with Beal High School, where students enrolled in Beal sixth form study at either Forest Academy or Beal High School. Courses offered at the Forest Academy campus sixth for include a 3-year pathway, including GCSEs English and maths and level 2 courses, A-levels and Level 3 vocational qualifications.

== History ==
The Forest Academy was founded in 1951 as Kingswood Secondary School by Yorke, Rosenberg Mardall. Under its headmaster John Westbury OBE, it was amalgamated with Grange School to form Hainault High School in 1975. Between 1985 and 1991 the school's name was changed from Hainault High School to Hainault Forest High School.

In 1991 Greg Deery became headteacher of Hainault Forest High School. On the 10th July 2003 it was announced that Hainault Forest High School had become the first school in Redbridge to be awarded Specialist School status in business and enterprise.

In 2004 Tim Westrip became acting headteacher from departing headteacher Greg Deery, after the school was judged to be failing in October 2003 and was put into special measures by Ofsted.

In September 2005 Kathryn Terrell became headteacher of Hainault Forest High School from acting headteacher Tim Westrip, who left after two terms at the school.

In March 2006 Hainault Forest High School escaped from special measures after Ofsted said the school had made significant progress.

On the 19th May 2010 Will Thompson became the headteacher.

In 2011 Hainault Forest High School joined the Beacon Multi-Academy Trust and in 2012 was renamed to The Forest Academy.

In August 2020 Will Mackintosh became principal of the Forest Academy, replacing Will Thompson. In September 2024 Lewis Ansell and Ed Macleod were appointed co-heads of the Forest Academy. On 28 February 2025 Ansell was appointed principal.

On the 1st December 2025 it was announced that Ansell had died. Will Mackintosh was brought back as temporary principal.

== Notable former pupils ==
- Mz Bratt - Cleopatra Humphrey, electro/grime singer
- Justin Hoyte, footballer

=== Chigwell Hunstman Road High School ===
- Bob Crow, trade union leader
