= Clayhall =

District of Ilford, London, England

Coordinates: 51.5906°N 0.0604°E

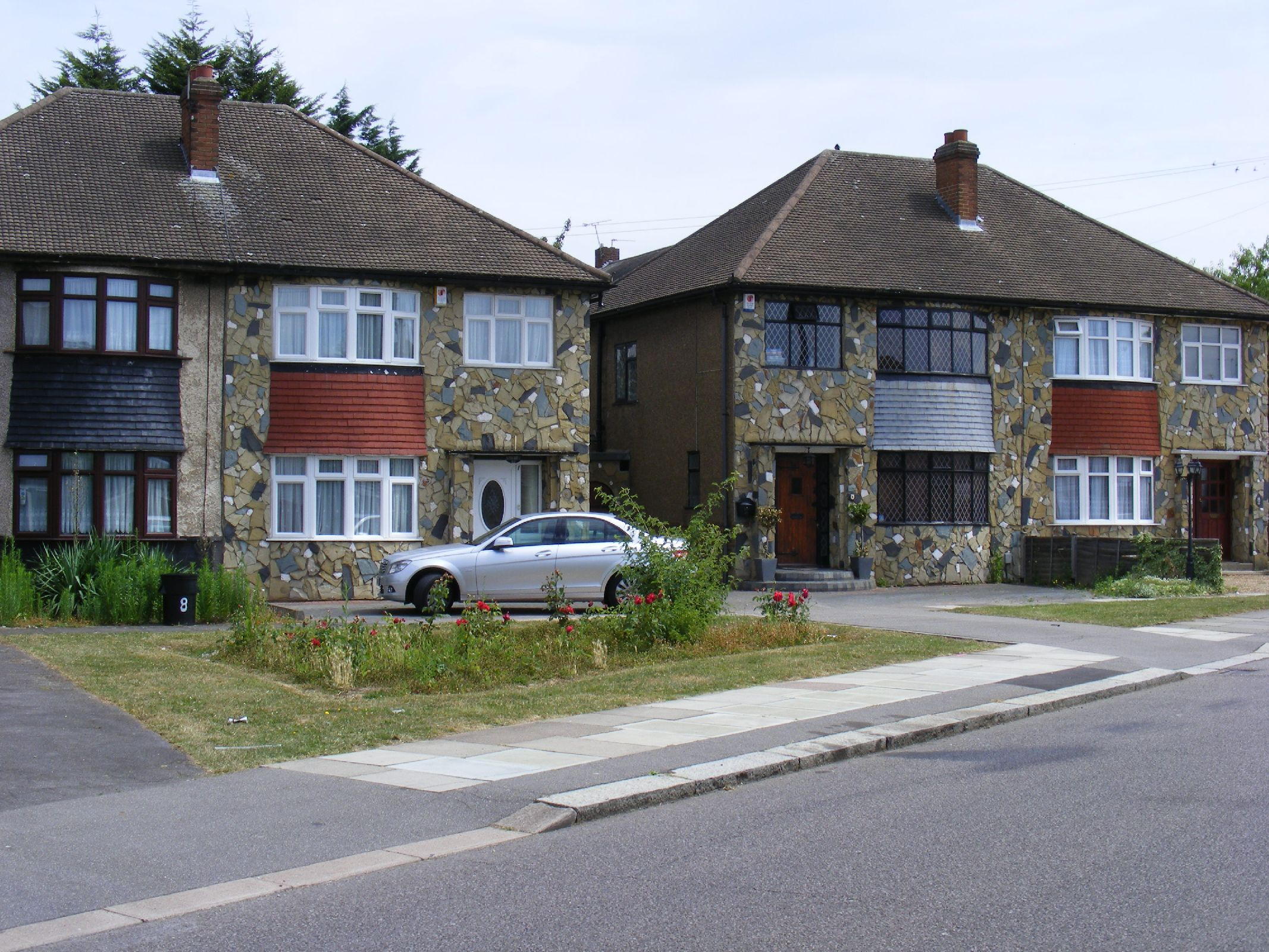

- Location within Greater London
- Population: 13,241 (2011 Census Ward)
- OS grid reference: TQ428899
- London borough: Redbridge
- Ceremonial county: Greater London
- Region: London
- Country: England
- Sovereign state: United Kingdom
- Post town: ILFORD
- Postcode district: IG5
- Dialling code: 020
- Police: Metropolitan
- Fire: London
- Ambulance: London
- UK Parliament: Ilford North
- London Assembly: Havering and Redbridge

Clayhall is a district of Ilford in the London Borough of Redbridge in east London, England. It is a suburban development. The name is derived from an old manor house that stood within the current area. It is first mentioned in a document of 1203 as being an area of land granted to Adam and Matilda de la Claie by Richard de la Claie. The estate probably remained in the hands of this family for about one hundred years, after which it passed through several hands, without ever being positively identified by name, until in a conveyance of 1410 it is described as the manor of Clayhall.

In the 17th century, Sir Christopher Hatton, cousin of the Lord Chancellor Sir Christopher Hatton, lived at the Manor House. His widow sold the manor to Sir John Wolstenholme. By the middle of the next century the estate was let to tenant farmers. The last tenants of the property were William Ingram, until his death in 1853, and then William, James and Frank Lamb, respectively father, son and grandson. The manor house itself was demolished, probably during the ownership of Peter Eaton, in the middle of the 18th century, and replaced by a farm house. The estate was broken up for building sites in 1935.

Clayhall Park in Longwood Gardens is one of Ilford's largest open spaces and has a bowling green, two children's play areas and tennis courts. Clayhall also has a small community library, operated by Vision RCL and a part of Redbridge Libraries.

== Education ==
Ilford County High School, Barkingside Beal High School, Caterham High School, Gilbert Colvin Primary School, Glade Primary School, King Solomon High School, Clore Tikva primary school and Parkhill Junior School.

== Transportation ==
Despite its large population and area size, Clayhall has no direct London Underground or other rail link. The closest tube stations are Gants Hill, Barkingside, Fairlop, Hainault, Chigwell, South Woodford and Redbridge, which are all served by the Central line in a circumferential proximity of the district. The nearest railway station is Ilford, which is served by the Elizabeth line, (previously TfL Rail).

The area does, however, have a few London Bus routes.

Route Number	Route	Via	Operator	Operation
123	Ilford Hainault Street to Wood Green Bus Station	Gants Hill, Walthamstow, Tottenham, Turnpike Lane	Arriva London	Daily. London Buses service. Times
128	Claybury Broadway to Romford Station	Barkingside, Gants Hill, Ilford station	Stagecoach London	Daily. London Buses service. Times
169	Barking Town Centre to Clayhall The Glade	Ilford, Newbury Park, Barkingside	Stagecoach London	Daily. London Buses service. Times
179	Chingford to Ilford Hainault Street	Woodford Green, South Woodford, Gants Hill	Stagecoach London	Daily. London Buses service. Times
462	Ilford to Hainault	Barkingside	Stagecoach London	Daily. London Buses service. Times
679	Goodmayes to Woodford Wells	Ilford, Gants Hill, South Woodford	Blue Triangle	School Days. London Buses service. Times
SL2	Walthamstow Central to North Woolwich	South Woodford, Gants Hill, Ilford, Barking, Gallions Reach	Arriva London	Daily, express service. London Buses service. Times
