= RAF Fairlop =

Former Royal Air Force station in Essex, England

RAF Fairlop
- Fairlop, London in England

Site information
- Type: Royal Air Force satellite station 1941-44
- Code: FP
- Owner: Air Ministry
- Operator: Royal Air Force
- Controlled by: RAF Fighter Command 1941-44 * No. 11 Group RAF; RAF Balloon Command 1944-46 * No. 24 Balloon Centre

Location
- Shown within Greater London RAF Fairlop (the United Kingdom)
- Coordinates: 51°35′16″N 000°06′10″E

Site history
- Built: 1940/41
- In use: November 1941 – August 1946
- Battles/wars: European theatre of World War II

Airfield information
- Elevation: 26 metres (85 ft) AMSL
Runways
Direction	Length and surface
02/20	1,006 metres (3,301 ft) Concrete
06/24	1,465 metres (4,806 ft) Concrete & Asphalt
11/29	1,006 metres (3,301 ft) Concrete

Royal Air Force Fairlop or more simply RAF Fairlop is a former Royal Air Force satellite station situated near Ilford in Essex. Fairlop is now a district in the London Borough of Redbridge, England.

== History ==
=== First World War ===
A site to the east of RAF Fairlop called "Hainault Farm" was used during the First World War, and saw service as a Royal Air Force Home Defence Flight Station.

A number of airmen died at Fairlop during and shortly after the war. In September 1918, Captain Iorwerth Davies crashed his Avro 504k aircraft and was killed. In 1919, Sergeant Russe J. Cound was killed and Captain Starbuck seriously injured when their plane stalled and crashed from a height of 200 feet.

=== Between the wars ===
A small flying club used another nearby site between the wars and there were plans to build a commercial airport in the Fairlop area for London, but those plans were later abandoned due to the realization that smog and haze from the residential and industrial areas nearby would be a hazard to operations. A further three sites just to the north of Fairlop and Hainault Farm were used as civilian aerodromes mid-war.

=== Second World War ===
The airfield at Fairlop was built in late 1940 when three concrete runways in an "A" pattern tilted 45 degrees anti-clockwise were constructed. The airfield became operational in September 1941 with the arrival of No. 603 (City of Edinburgh) Squadron RAF, flying Supermarine Spitfires, previously stationed at RAF Hornchurch. The adjacent Hainault Lodge was used as officer accommodation. In June 1944 RAF Fairlop became home to No. 24 Balloon Centre with four squadrons forming part of the balloon barrage around London. The balloons were manned by members of the Women's Auxiliary Air Force. No 24 Balloon Centre was disbanded in February 1945 and the airfield closed in August 1946.

=== After the wars ===
In 1947, plans we revived to build a commercial airport at Fairlop. At the time, it was reported that Fairlop could become the "No. 1 continental airport", but again the plans fell through. By 1950, the airfield was disused.

=== Squadrons ===
Squadrons stationed at RAF Fairlop:

- No. 19 Squadron RAF (1943)
- No. 64 Squadron RAF (1942 & 1943)
- No. 65 (East India) Squadron RAF (1943)
- No. 81 Squadron RAF (1942)
- No. 122 (Bombay) Squadron RAF (1942)
- No. 154 (Motor Industries) Squadron RAF (1942)
- No. 164 (Argentine–British) Squadron RAF (1944)
- No. 182 Squadron RAF (1943)
- No. 193 (Fellowship of the Bellows) Squadron RAF (1944)
- No. 195 Squadron RAF (1943-44)
- No. 239 Squadron RAF (1943)
- No. 245 (Northern Rhodesian) Squadron RAF (1943)
- No. 247 (China-British) Squadron RAF (1943)
- No. 287 Squadron RAF (1943)
- No. 302 Polish Fighter Squadron (1943)
- No. 313 (Czechoslovak) Squadron RAF (1942)
- No. 317 Polish Fighter Squadron (1943)
- No. 350 (Belgian) Squadron RAF (1943)
- No. 411 Squadron RCAF (1943)
- No. 602 (City of Glasgow) Squadron AAF (1943)
- No. 603 (City of Edinburgh) Squadron AAF (1941)

The following units were also here at some point:

- No. 24 Balloon Centre
  - No. 945/947 (Balloon) Sqn
  - No. 965 (Balloon) Sqn
  - No. 967 (Balloon) Sqn
  - No. 970 (Balloon) Sqn
  - No. 998 (Balloon) Sqn
- No. 54 Training Depot Station
- No. 207 Training Depot Station
- No. 121 Airfield Headquarters RAF
- No. 136 Airfield Headquarters RAF
- No. 146 Gliding School RAF
- No. 147 Gliding School RAF
- No. 2709 Squadron RAF Regiment
- No. 2737 Squadron RAF Regiment
- No. 2797 Squadron RAF Regiment
- No. 2811 Squadron RAF Regiment
- No. 2889 Squadron RAF Regiment
- No. 4077 Anti-Aircraft Flight RAF Regiment
- No. 4269 Anti-Aircraft Flight RAF Regiment
- No. 4335 Anti-Aircraft Flight RAF Regiment

== Current use ==
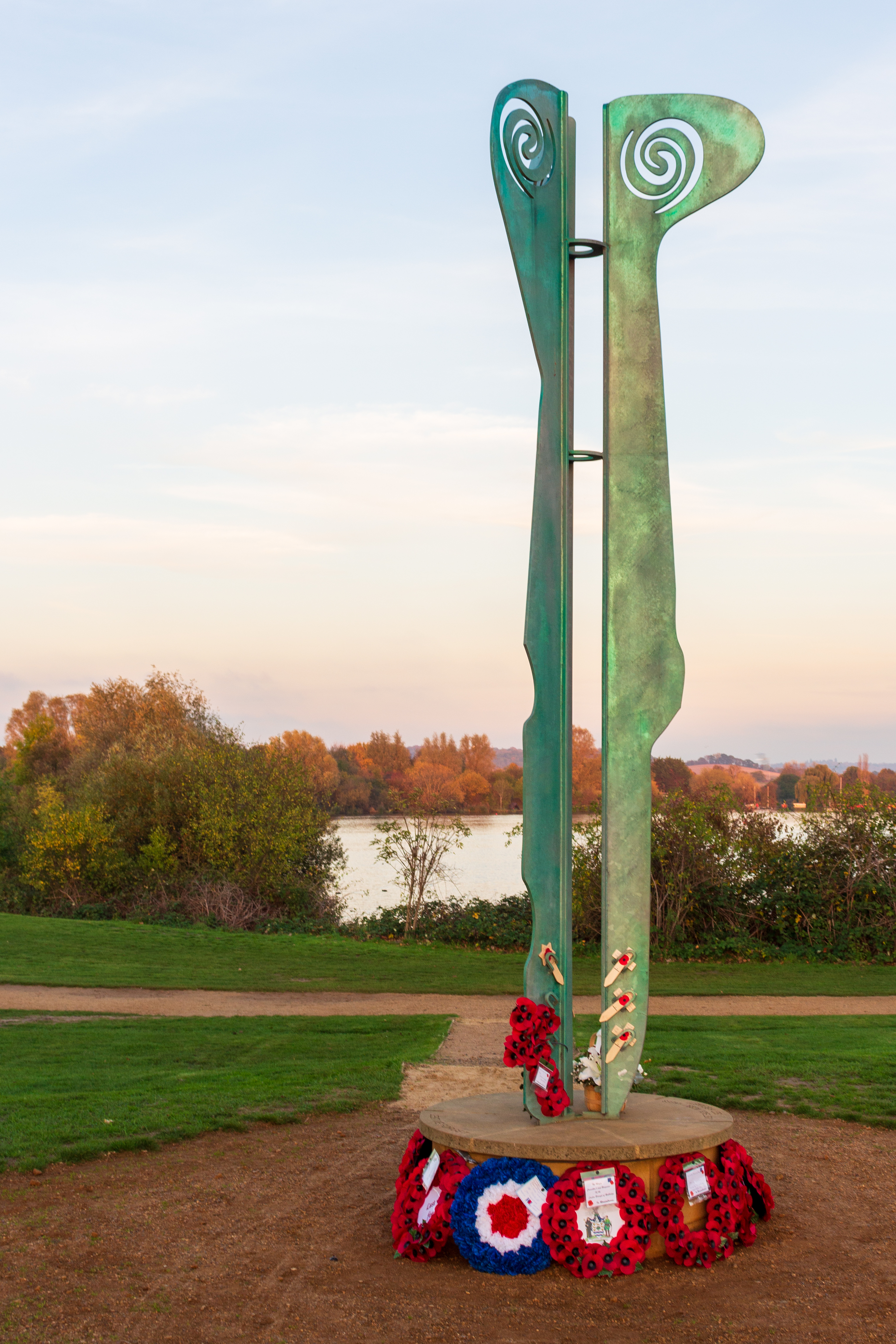
Commemorative sculpture, unveiled in 2013

The site was used for gravel extraction and became a country park known as Fairlop Waters with sailing facilities and a golf course. In November 2013 a sculpture was unveiled commemorating those who served at the Fairlop and Hainault airfields in wartime.

== See also ==
- List of former Royal Air Force stations
