= Parks and open spaces in the London Borough of Redbridge =

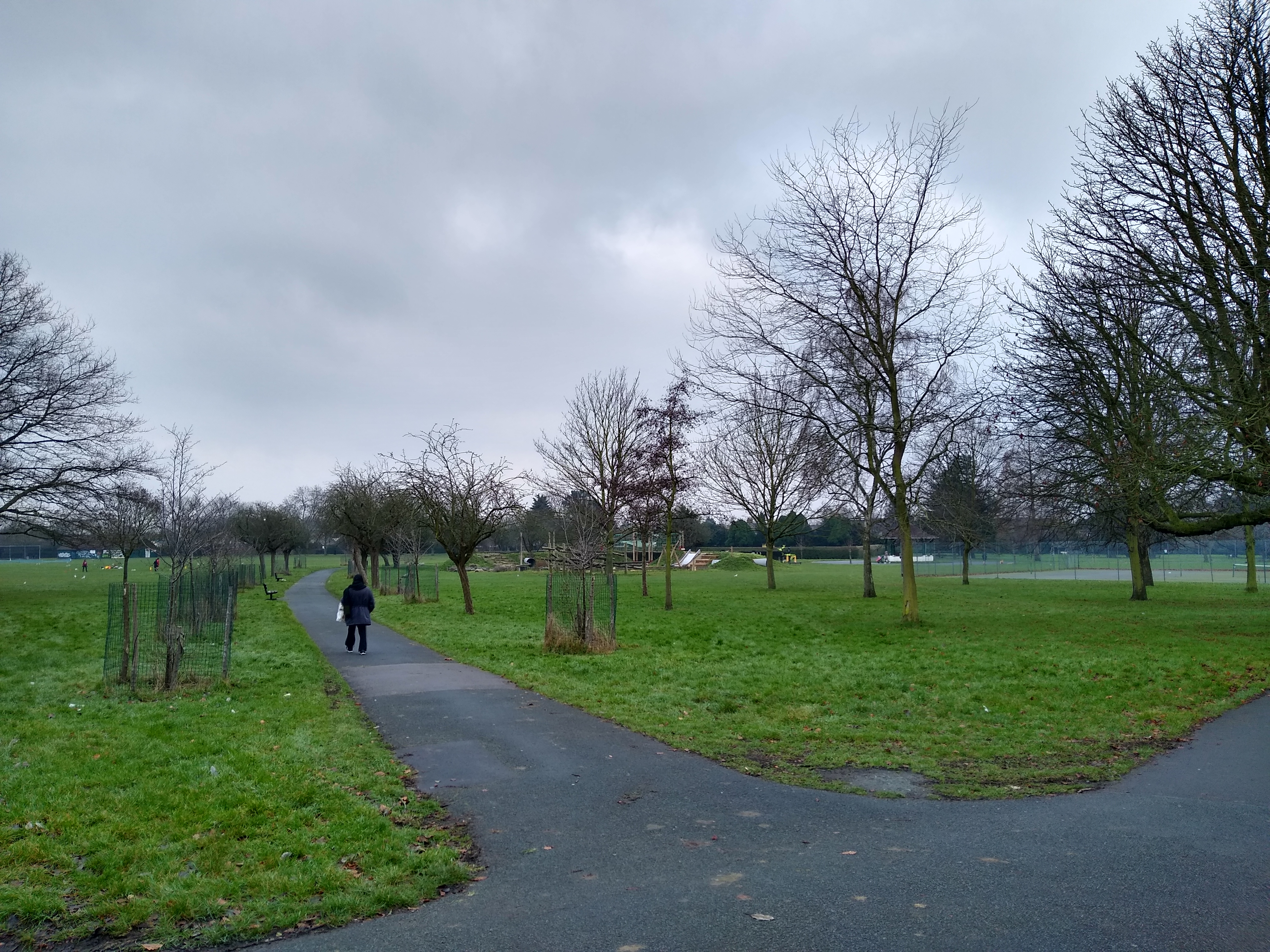
Seven Kings Park

The London Borough of Redbridge includes a number of public open spaces, much notably sections of Epping Forest. Apart from many smaller parks, gardens and sports grounds, the following are the main open spaces in Redbridge:

- Claybury Woods and Park
- Epping Forest – portions near Woodford, including
- Wanstead Flats, a part of Epping Forest
- Wanstead Park, not part of Epping Forest, but managed as such.
- Hainault Forest Country Park: 136 hectares (340 acres)
- Hainault Lodge Nature Reserve: 6.8 hectares (17 acres)
- Fairlop Waters: an open space with two lakes and a golf course, at Fairlop
- Goodmayes Park
- Loxford Park
- Seven Kings Park
- Roding Valley Park
- South Park, Ilford 13.5 hectares (33 acres)
- Valentines Park, Ilford: 52 hectares (130 acres)
- Wanstead Golf Course

Fairlop Waters Country Park is one of 11 parks throughout Greater London chosen to receive money for redevelopment by a public vote, in 2009. The park received £400,000 towards better footpaths, more lighting, refurbished public toilets and new play areas for children.

The parks are patrolled by the Redbridge Community Police Team.
