= Barkingside =

Area of Ilford in East London, England

Coordinates: 51.585833°N 0.084444°E

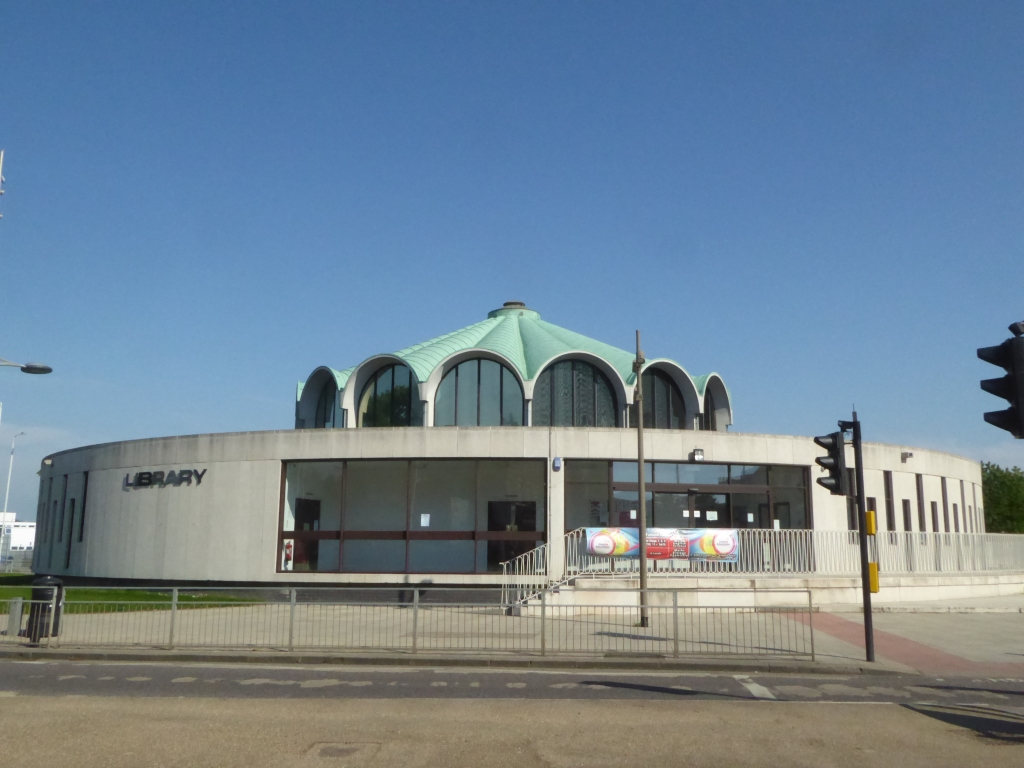
- Fullwell Cross Library.

- Location within Greater London
- Population: 12,609 (2011 Census. Ward)
- OS grid reference: TQ445895
  - Charing Cross: 10.6 mi (17.1 km) SW
- London borough: Redbridge
- Ceremonial county: Greater London
- Region: London
- Country: England
- Sovereign state: United Kingdom
- Post town: ILFORD
- Postcode district: IG6
- Dialling code: 020
- Police: Metropolitan
- Fire: London
- Ambulance: London
- UK Parliament: Ilford North
- London Assembly: Havering and Redbridge

Barkingside is an area in Ilford, in the London Borough of Redbridge. It includes the major road junction of Fullwell Cross, which also gives its name to the locality near that roundabout. The area is situated 10.6 miles (17km) north east of Charing Cross. Prior to 1965, it formed part of the borough of Ilford in the historic county of Essex.

Barkingside is chiefly known for the children's charity Barnardo's, which was founded there in 1866, and still has its headquarters there. Some of the oldest buildings in Barkingside include the Barnardo's chapel, the Edwardian railway station (in 1948 transferred from LNER to London Underground's Central Line), and Holy Trinity Church, which dates from 1840. Barkingside is notable for its concentration of east London's Jewish population.

== Toponymy ==
=== Barkingside ===
The area's name is believed to be due to its location on the Barking side of Hainault Forest, just inside the boundary of the Manor and Parish of Barking (of which Great Ilford was a major sub-division) which ran through the forest.

Chapman and Andre's 1777 map of Essex shows Barking Side as a linear common on the western edge of Hainault Forest. The map showed a number of dwellings on the western side of the common, which had a road (the northern part of which survives as Tomswood Hill) running through it.

=== Fullwell Cross ===
The Fullwell Cross junction - now a roundabout - at the northern end of the Barkingside High Street is named after Adam Fulwell who leased a farm in the area from Barking Abbey. The element Cross may indicate a road junction and or a preaching location. Late 19th century Ordnance Survey maps show the location with the alternative name Fullwell Hatch. It must not be confused with the district of Fulwell in south-west London.

== Education ==
Barkingside has two secondary schools: Ilford County High School and King Solomon High School. Primary schools in the area include Clore Tikva Primary School, Fullwood Primary School, Mossford Green Primary School, Wohl Ilford Jewish Primary School and Avanti Court Primary School.

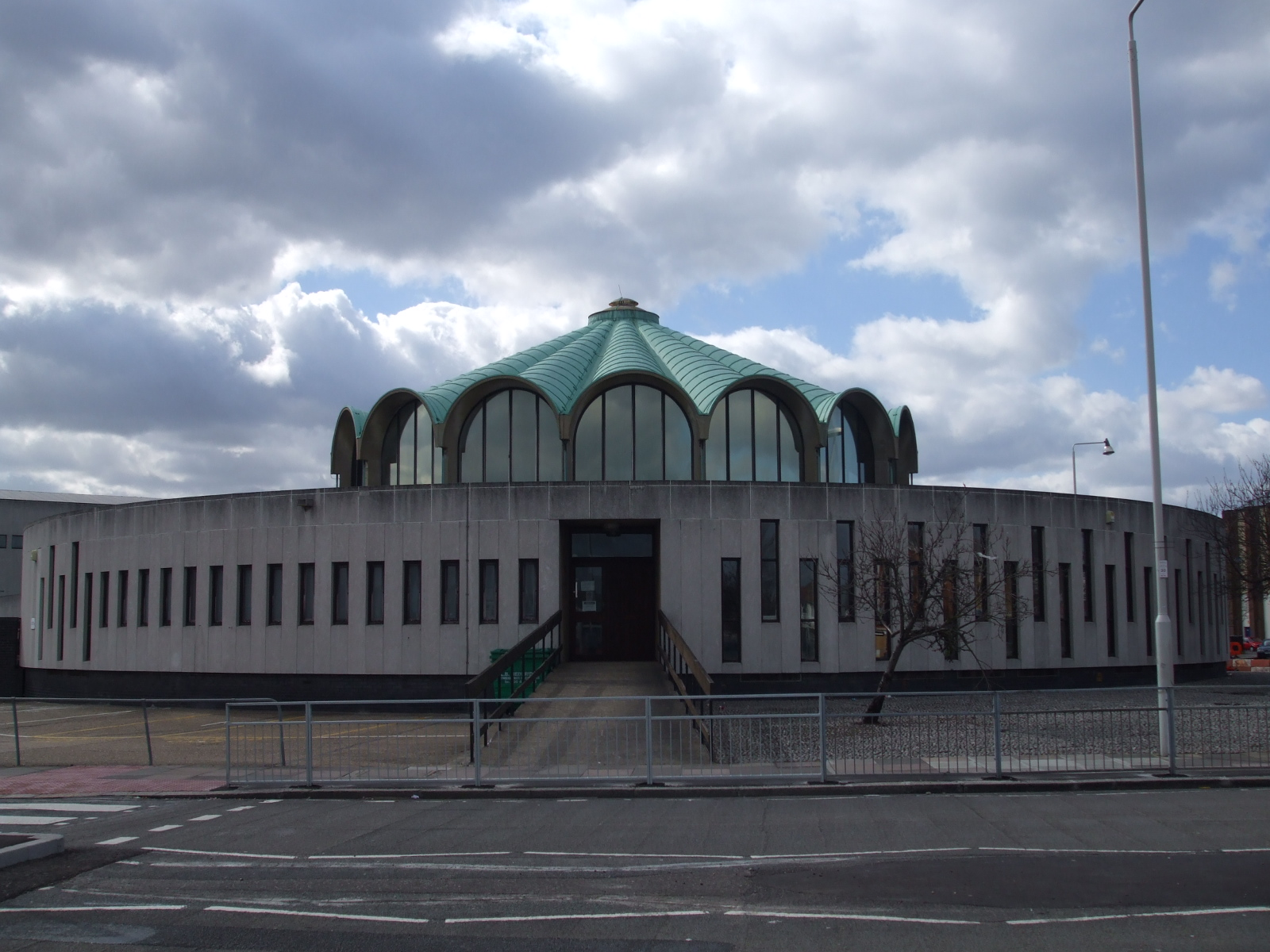
Fullwell Cross Library, near the roundabout of the same name.

== Amenities ==
At the northern end of the High Street is Fullwell Cross roundabout, which gives its name to the adjacent leisure centre and distinctive circular Grade II listed library building (both designed by the architect Frederick Gibberd) as well as the Fullwell Cross locality.

Ken Aston Square, located between the leisure centre and library, was officially opened on 27 September 2014. Ken Aston had been a local headteacher and the football referee thought to have introduced red and yellow cards. His name was chosen from a shortlist by residents. The square is bordered on one side by a long arched colonnade designed in the style of the library building and providing a covered, lit space.

A small turfed space at the High Street end of Virginia Gardens known as the pocket park was also completed in 2014, partly funded by the GLA Pocket Parks Programme. Its informal landscaping references Frederick Gibberd's garden and consists of trees, mixed shrubs and a Christmas tree. Both square and park are outcomes of the Better Barkingside regeneration project.

Barkingside has two public houses. The New Fairlop Oak pub is located on the Fullwell Cross roundabout, named after a giant tree under which an annual fair took place for over a century. At the other end of the High Street is the Chequers pub. For over 70 years Barkingside was the home to the famous Rossi Bros Italian Ice Cream Parlour.

== Sport and leisure ==
Three non-league football clubs Redbridge FC, Hashtag United FC and London Seaward FC play at the Oakside Stadium, adjacent to Barkingside tube station. Barkingside Recreational Ground in Mossford Green is one of the area's most popular open spaces. Popular footballer Trevor Brooking who played for West Ham United and England attended Ilford County High School. Successful British Racing driver Scott Malvern grew up in Barkingside and attended Fairlop Primary School and then Caterham High School. Caterham High School is a sports academy and attended by youth team players of West Ham United football club who have their training ground nearby.

== Transport ==
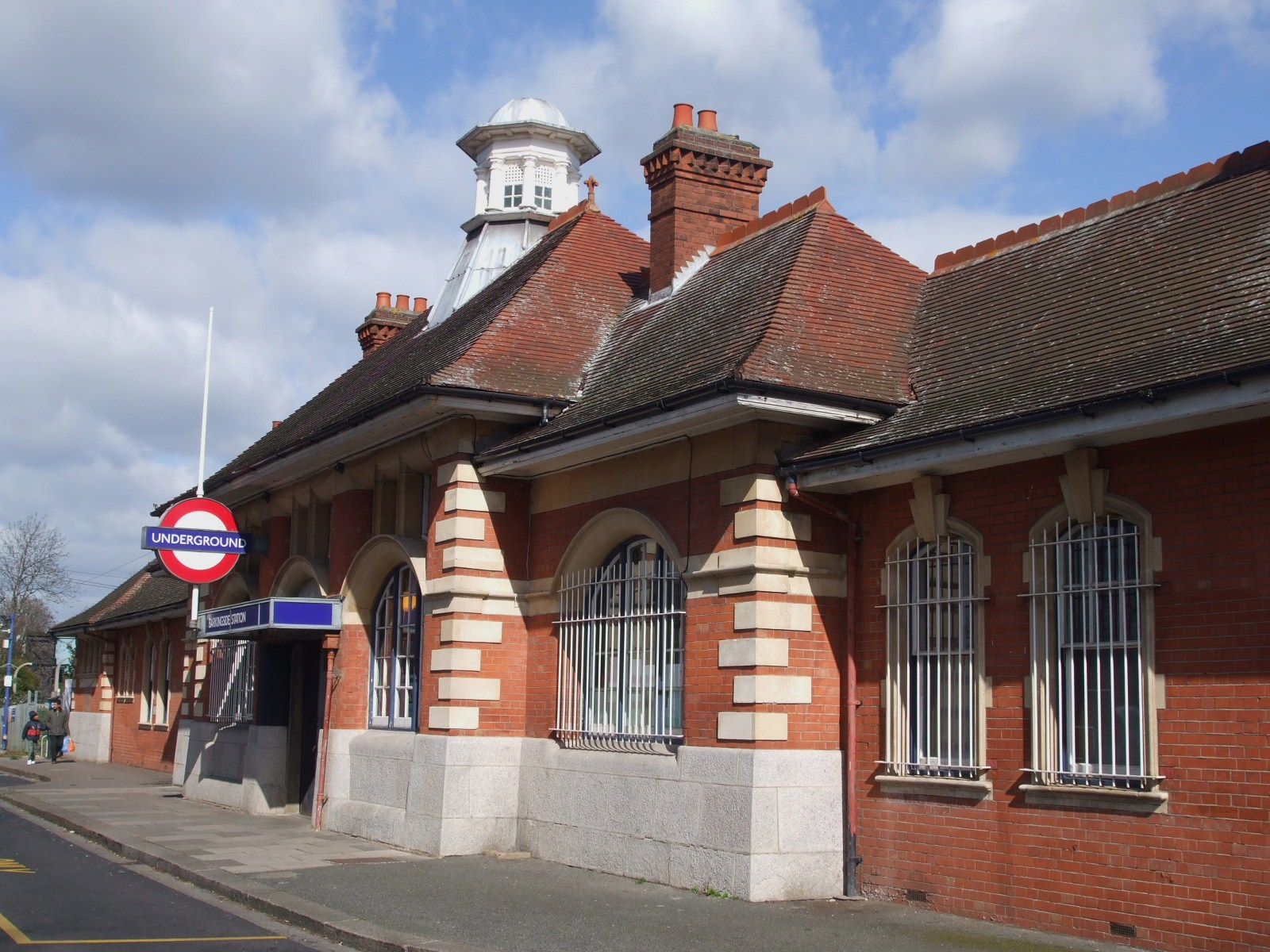
Barkingside tube station

The nearest London Underground station is Barkingside tube station on the Central line. Barkingside is also served by London Buses routes 128, 150, 167, 169, 247, 275, 462 and N8.

== Notable people ==
- Trevor Brooking, footballer, attended Ilford County High School..
- Scott Malvern, motor racing driver, grew up in Barkingside and attended Fairlop Primary School and Caterham High School.
- Kathy Kirby, singer, grew up in Barkingside.

== Nearby places ==
- Clayhall
- Fairlop
- Gants Hill
- Redbridge
- Newbury Park
- Woodford
- Chigwell
