= Fairlop =

Area of Ilford, East London

Coordinates: 51.5999°N 0.0833°E

- Location within Greater London
- Population: 12,630 (ward, 2011)
- OS grid reference: TQ449906
- London borough: Redbridge
- Ceremonial county: Greater London
- Region: London
- Country: England
- Sovereign state: United Kingdom
- Post town: ILFORD
- Postcode district: IG6
- Dialling code: 020
- Police: Metropolitan
- Fire: London
- Ambulance: London
- UK Parliament: Ilford North
- London Assembly: Havering and Redbridge

Fairlop is a suburban area of Ilford, in the London Borough of Redbridge in East London. Historically in Essex, it was part of the Municipal Borough of Ilford until 1965, when the Borough, including Fairlop, became part of Greater London. It lies close to areas such as Loughton, Chigwell, Barkingside and Woodford.

As well as its residential areas, the district includes farmland, woodland and recreational facilities such as Fairlop Waters and Redbridge Sports Centre. The area, which has a tube station, is located 11 miles north-east of Charing Cross.

The area takes its name from the Fairlop Oak, a large tree, which once stood in the area, which was then part of Hainault Forest. The area was historically famous for the Fairlop Fair, a long-standing East End institution. The festival which would grow to last for a full week per year, drew crowds of up to 300,000, mainly from the East End of London.

== History and origins of the name ==
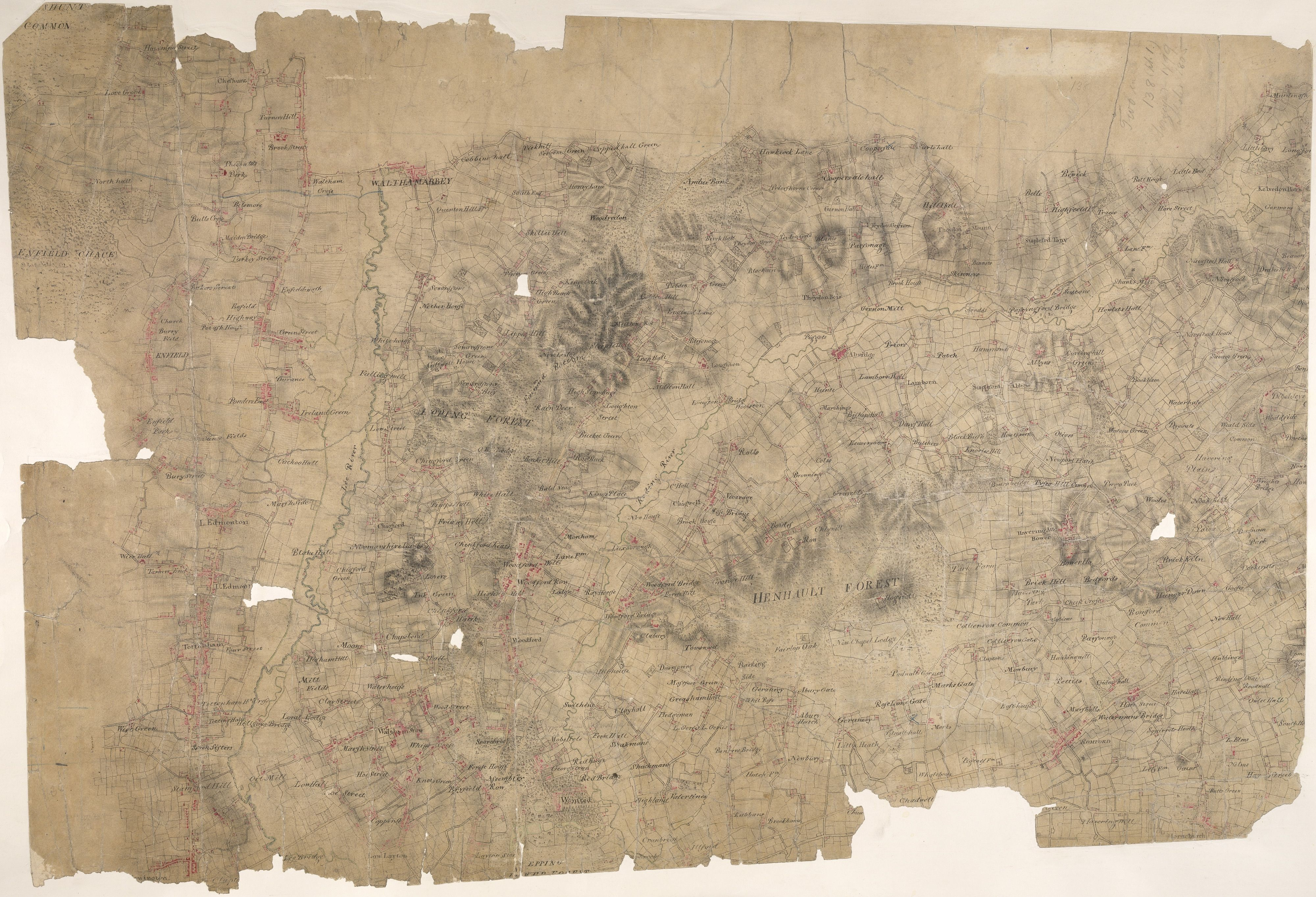
Map of Hainault Forest, and Fairlop Oak, around 1805

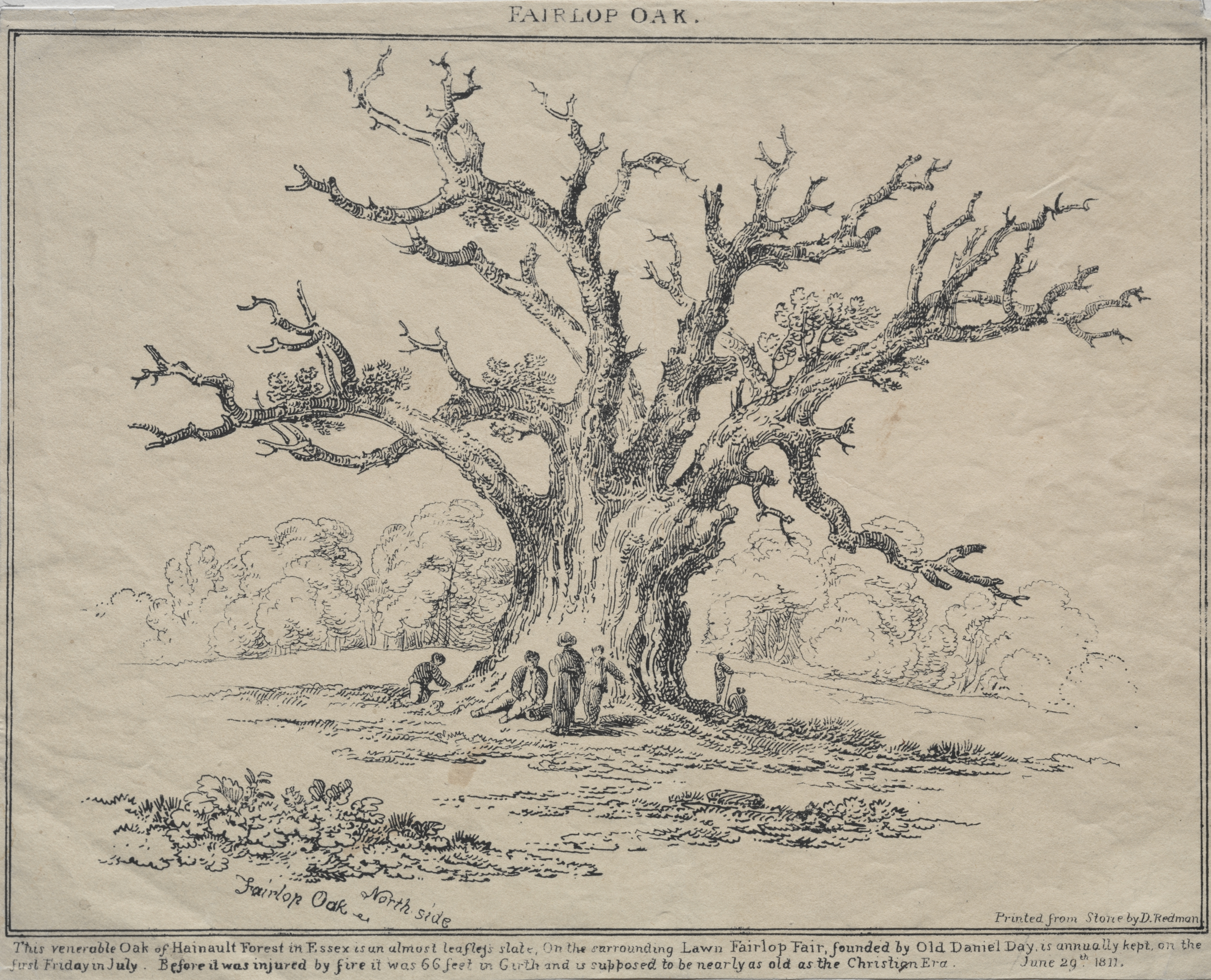
The Fairlop Oak, around 1812

=== The Fairlop Oak ===
The district took its name from a famous old oak tree, the Fairlop Oak, that stood in Hainault Forest; most of the forest was destroyed in the mid-nineteenth century. Similarly, the Romany name for the district Boro-rukenesky gav means 'Great Tree Town'.

The first certain known use of the name is recorded in 1738 as Fair Lop Tree. This disproves the tradition that the name arose after the burial of Daniel Day at Barking Church (Ilford and with it Hainault Forest were part of the ancient parish of Barking at this time) in 1767. Day is believed to have been buried in a coffin made from a large bough that fell from the tree - so according to the story it was a 'fair lop (cut)' as the tree wasn't harmed.

The oak, which stood in an open part of the forest known as Fairlop Plain, is said to have had a trunk sixty-six feet in circumference, from which seventeen branches issued, most of them measuring not less than twelve feet in girth.

A legend has it that Queen Anne (reigned 1702-1714) visited Hainault Forest and was greatly impressed by the oak. One of the songs sung at the fair (which started in 1725) was called "Come, come, my boys", in which one verse states:

To Hainault Forest Queen Anne did ride,
And saw the old oak standing by her side,
And as she looked at it from bottom to top,
She said to her Court, it should be at Fairlop.

In the late 18th century, a society of archers - The Hainault Foresters - under the patronage of the Earl Tylney of Wanstead House met under the Fairlop Oak.

In June 1805, the oak tree caught fire, and by 1820 it was finally blown down. Its site is marked roughly at the boat house by the lake at Fairlop Waters. In nearby Fullwell Cross is a pub called the New Fairlop Oak.

The tree's great fame meant its timber was much sought after. A pulpit (once taller) can be found at St Pancras New Church, central London, which was built in 1822. Closer to home, the sounding board at St Mary the Virgin, Wanstead, is said to be made from the oak, and some smaller items made from the tree are found in the Redbridge Museum. The oak features on the coats of arms of the Municipal Borough of Ilford, and its successor the London Borough of Redbridge.

=== The Fairlop Fair ===
The fair was started in July 1725, by Daniel Day (1683-1767), an eccentric and philanthropic pump and block maker (marine engineer) from Wapping. Day had some cottages near Fairlop and collected the rent on the first Friday of July. He wished to make the day a pleasant one for his tenants, friends and employees at Wapping so organised a trip to the Fairlop Oak, where a meal of beans and bacon was served. This may be the origin of the English words bean-feast and beano.

Soon other employers began to take their employees to Fairlop on the same Friday, and the event so grew rapidly in size with entertainments laid on and soon the fair gained a life of its own with very large numbers attending what had become a huge social event. The fair always started on the first Friday of July, but what started as a one day event became a week long festival.

By the middle of the eighteenth century, the annual excursion to Fairlop had become one of London's most popular entertainments, with a hundred thousand people being drawn through Ilford to the fair in the forest. Later it would attract still larger crowds reaching 2-300,000 people.

In 1851, there was an Act of Parliament permitting the enclosure of Hainault Forest, the large majority of which was quickly destroyed and turned into farmland.

After the destruction of the forest, the fair continued on a smaller scale at Barkingside, with the last event of any size held in 1900.

=== Fairlop Frigates ===
Daniel Day would always attend the fair, but became nervous of travelling by road following an accident. To avoid the roads as far as possible he had a boat built - nicknamed the Fairlop Frigate - on which he travelled on the Thames downstream from Wapping, and then up the River Roding to Ilford. At Ilford the boat would be taken out of the water, wheels attached, and the boat would then be drawn by six horses and follow a marching band to the fair in the forest.

The Fairlop Fair Song is a folk ballad which refers to the presence of the frigates at the fair:

Let music sound as the boat goes round,
If we tumble on the ground, we'll be merry I'll be bound;
We will booze it away, dull care we will defy,
And be happy in the first Friday in July.

A tradition of wheeled Fairlop Frigates would continue long after Day's death, to the last Fairlop Fair in 1900.

== Location ==
The district is bordered by Barkingside, including its High Street shopping district to the South, and also borders Claybury Park, which used to be home to Claybury Hospital. Neighbouring areas include Barkingside, Aldborough Hatch, and Hainault to the North (it is the Northernmost area of Ilford).

Historically, it didn't form any subdivision of its own, but it was the northernmost settlement of the large parish of Ilford, in the Becontree hundred of Essex.

== Demography ==
According to the 2011 census in Fairlop ward, the population was 78% white (67% British, 9% Other, 2% Irish). 12% is Other-Asian and 9% Other.

== Transport ==
In 1903 a railway station at Fairlop was opened on a new loop line that formed part of the Great Eastern Railway. In 1948 the line was taken over by the London Underground as part of the eastward extension of the Central line and the station became Fairlop Underground station.

Forest Road, the area's main road, did not have a bus service until route 462 was extended from Hainault to Fairlop in June 2016.

== See also ==
- Barkingside
- Fairlop tube station
- Fairlop's history
