= Beal High School =

Coordinates: 51.586°N 0.051°E

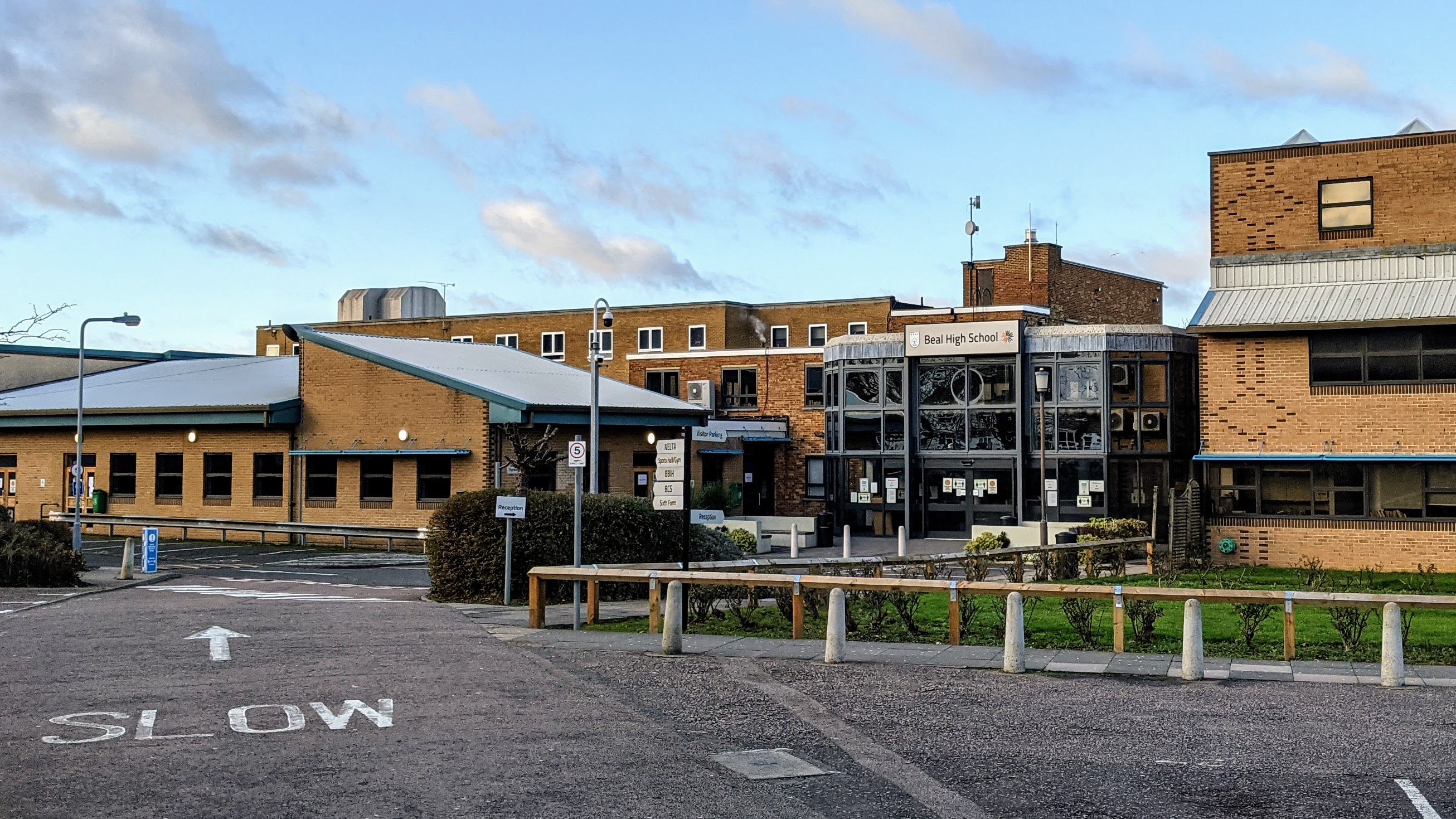

Location
- Woodford Bridge Road; Redbridge, Greater London, IG4 5LP; England

Information
- Type: Academy
- Motto: A compelling vision for success
- Established: 1931
- Local authority: Redbridge
- Department for Education URN: 140575 Tables
- Ofsted: Reports
- Executive Headteacher: Kathryn Burns
- Staff: 250+
- Gender: Mixed
- Age: 11 to 18
- Enrolment: 360 (per year 7-11)+ (900+ in sixth form)
- Colours: Brown, black and yellow
- Website: bealhighschool.co.uk

Beal High School is a coeducational secondary school and sixth form with academy status, located in Redbridge, Greater London, England.

The school begins at Year 7 and continues with compulsory schooling through Year 11. Years 12 and 13 form the optional sixth form. In 2014, a business hub and media block were added. The school also has a Communications and Learning Department (CLD Unit) for students on the autistic spectrum. Beal High School is also the sponsor of The Forest Academy (formerly Hainault Forest High School), and the Beacon Business Innovation Hub (BBIH). These schools, alongside the autistic provision, form the Beacon Multi Academy Trust.

== History ==
The school converted to academy status on 1 February 2014. The name of the Trust changed from Beal Multi-Academy Trust to Beacon Multi-Academy Trust in 2016.

== Staff ==
The headteacher is Kathryn Burns.

In December 2006, the school was designated as a 'Highly Achieving Specialist School'. As of 2021 Ofsted rate the school as "Good".

The school offers extra-curricular activities including concerts and musical theatre productions. Students can participate in debating, enterprise activities, sport teams and musical groups.

== Notable former pupils ==
- Simon Amstell (born 1979) – television presenter and comedian
- Yolanda Brown (born 1982) – jazz musician
- Joe Ellis-Grewal (born 1992) – cricketer
- Nick Frost (born 1972) – comedian and actor
- Marc Seigar (born 1971) – astronomer, author, and academic leader
- Louise Wener (born 1966) – musician and author
- Hazel Keech (Born 1987) – model, Bollywood actress and dancer
- Penny Lancaster (born 1971) – model and photographer
- Josh Dasilva, footballer
- Amanda Rosario, actor

=== Beal Grammar School for Boys ===
- Gareth Davis, chairman since 2010 of William Hill (bookmaker)
- Bill Hagerty (born 1939) – writer, author and critic, former national newspaper editor, Editor 1991-92 of The People
- Phil Hall (journalist), Editor from 1995 to 2000 of the News of the World
- Barry Kyle (born 1947) – theatre director
- Victor Maddern (1928–1993) – actor
- Allan McKeown (1946–2013) TV producer (Auf Wiedersehen, Pet), married to Tracey Ullman
- Ian Ridpath (born 1947) – astronomer and writer
