= Caterham High School =

Location
- Clayhall, London, IG5 0QW; England
- Coordinates: 51.59297885710327°N 0.06149418278561153°E

Information
- Type: Community school
- Religious affiliation: Mixed
- Established: 17 April 1956
- Local authority: Redbridge
- Department for Education URN: 102849 Tables
- Ofsted: Reports
- Head teacher: B. Chapple
- Gender: Co-educational
- Age: 11 to 18
- Website: www.ecaterham.net

Caterham High School is a mixed, comprehensive 11-18 school in Clayhall, London.

There are 1100 students in the school. The school is supported by the Arts Council. It had a newly built school building in 2006 at a cost of £1.4 million.

The school has many sports facilities available from football, netball and basketball courts to gyms, netball and badminton courts and lastly a huge swimming pool used by all students.

British racing driver Scott Malvern was a pupil at Caterham High School during 2000–2006.
