= Joe Ellis-Grewal =

English cricketer (born 1992)

Personal information
- Full name: Joe Sukhdev Edwin Ellis-Grewal
- Born: 18 February 1992 (age 34); Walthamstow, Essex, England
- Batting: Left-handed
- Bowling: Slow left-arm orthodox

Domestic team information
- Years: Team
- 2014: Suffolk
- 2015: Leeds/Bradford MCCU

Career statistics
Competition	First-class
Matches	2
Runs scored	44
Batting average	22.00
100s/50s	–/–
Top score	42
Balls bowled	338
Wickets	6
Bowling average	33.50
5 wickets in innings	–
10 wickets in match	–
Best bowling	4/118
Catches/stumpings	–/–
- Source: Cricinfo, 11 July 2019

Joe Sukhdev Edwin Ellis-Grewal (born 18 February 1992) is an English former first-class cricketer.

Ellis-Grewal was born at Walthamstow in February 1992. He was educated at Beal High School, before going up to the University of Leeds. While studying at Leeds, he made two appearances in first-class cricket for Leeds/Bradford MCCU in 2015, against Sussex and Yorkshire. He scored 44 runs in these matches, with a high score of 42, while with his slow left-arm orthodox bowling, he took 6 wickets with best figures of 4 for 118. In addition to playing first-class cricket, he also played minor counties cricket for Suffolk in 2014, making a single appearance in the Minor Counties Championship and five appearances in the MCCA Knockout Trophy.
