= Redbridge Town Hall =

Municipal building in London, England

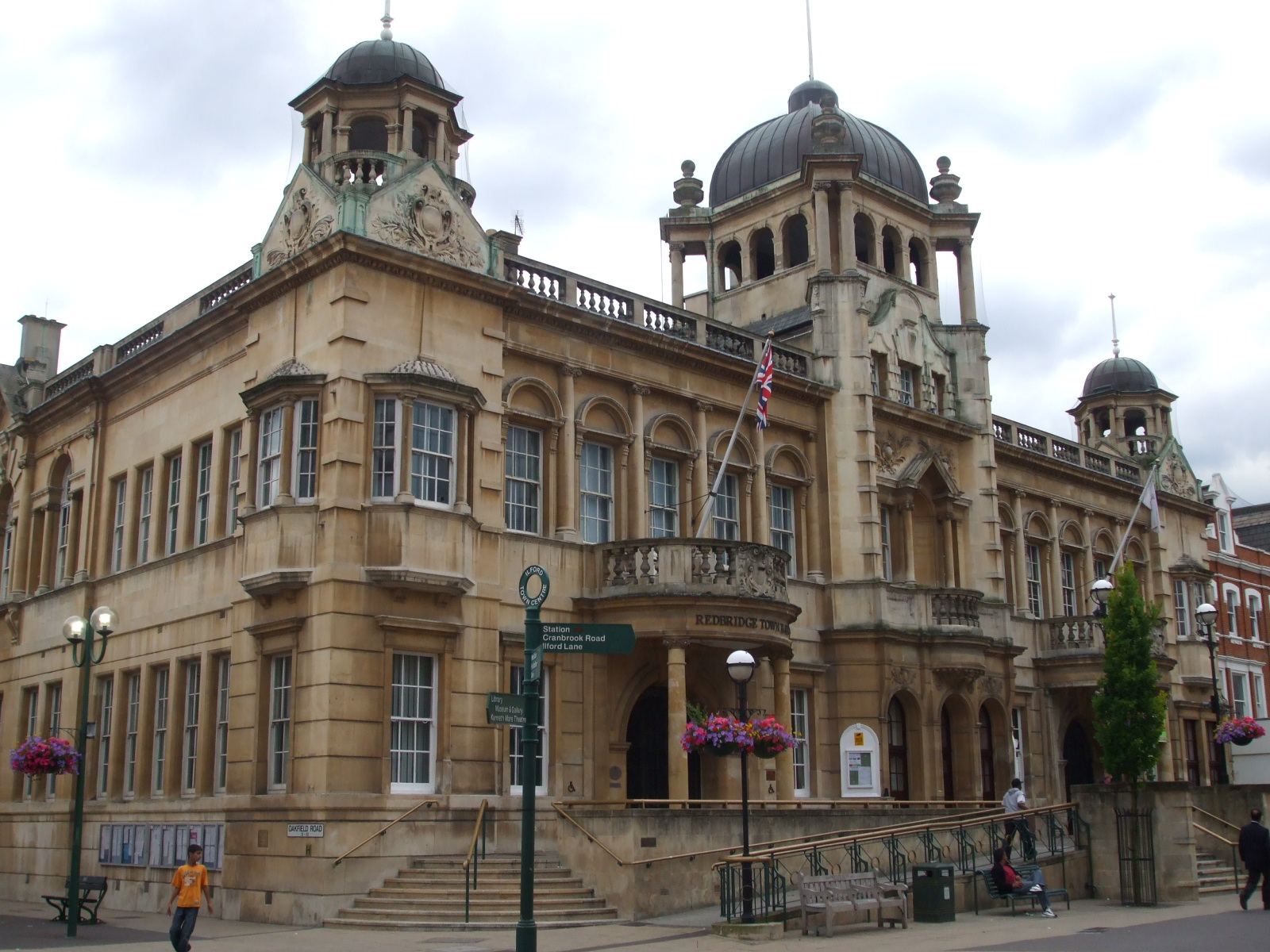
- Redbridge Town Hall

- Shown in Redbridge
- 51.5589°N 0.0741°E
- Location: High Road, Ilford

History
- Built: 1901

Site notes
- Architect: Ben Woollard
- Architectural style: Renaissance style

Listed Building – Grade II
- Designated: 18 August 2003
- Reference no.: 1390560

Redbridge Town Hall is a municipal building in High Road, Ilford, London. The town hall, which is the headquarters of Redbridge London Borough Council, is a Grade II listed building.

== History ==
In the late 19th century, Ilford local board was based in rooms above a shop in Cranbrook Road, and after it became an urban district in 1895, it moved into a rented schoolroom in Ilford Hall in High Road in 1898. Civic leaders decided this arrangement was inadequate for their needs and that they would procure a new town hall: the site chosen, which was already on the council's ownership, had been occupied by the local fire station.

The foundation stone for the new building was laid by Councillor William Walter Gilson, Chairman of Ilford Urban District Council, on 17 March 1900. It was designed by Ben Woollard in the Renaissance style and was opened as Ilford Town Hall in December 1901. The design involved a symmetrical main frontage with five bays facing onto High Road; the central section featured a triple-round-arched entrance on the ground floor; on the first floor there was alcove and a balcony flanked by Ionic order columns; there was a cupola with Ionic order pavilions at each corner at roof level. There were also separate porches on either side at the front of the building giving access to the public hall to the east and the council offices to the west. Internally, the principal rooms were the public hall, the council chamber and the mayor's parlour.

The building went on to become the headquarters of the Municipal Borough of Ilford when the Duke and Duchess of York arrived to present the Royal charter on 21 October 1926. Also present at the charter ceremony was the Lord Lieutenant of Essex, Lord Lambourne, who was subsequently commemorated when the mayor's refreshment room was re-named in his memory. A library was built to the south to the designs of the borough engineer, H. Shaw, in 1927 and further alterations were carried out, infilling the area between the town hall and the library, to the designs of the then borough engineer, L. E .J. Reynolds, in 1933. The town hall was covered with flags and bunting in May 1945 to celebrate Victory in Europe Day towards the end of the Second World War.

The building continued to serve as the headquarters of the municipal borough for much of the 20th century and continued to be the local seat of government when the enlarged London Borough of Redbridge was formed in 1965. It also continued to be used as a venue for large events and also as the local registrars' office. The former library was converted into an art gallery, known as Space Ilford, which opened in December 2019. The London Borough of Redbridge continues to hold its council meetings in the town hall.
