= Redbridge London Borough Council =

Local authority for the London Borough of Redbridge

Type
- Type: London borough council of the London Borough of Redbridge
- Houses: Unicameral

Leadership
- Mayor: Bert Jones, Labour since 20 May 2026
- Leader: Kam Rai, Labour since 25 July 2024
- Chief Executive: Claire Hamilton since March 2025

Structure
- Seats: 63 councillors
- Political groups: Administration (43) Labour (43) Opposition (20) Redbridge Independents (9) Conservative (5) Green (5) Reform UK (1)
- Joint committees: East London Waste Authority
- Length of term: Whole council elected every four years

Elections
- Voting system: Plurality at-large (FPTP)
- Last election: 7 May 2026
- Next election: 2 May 2030

Meeting place
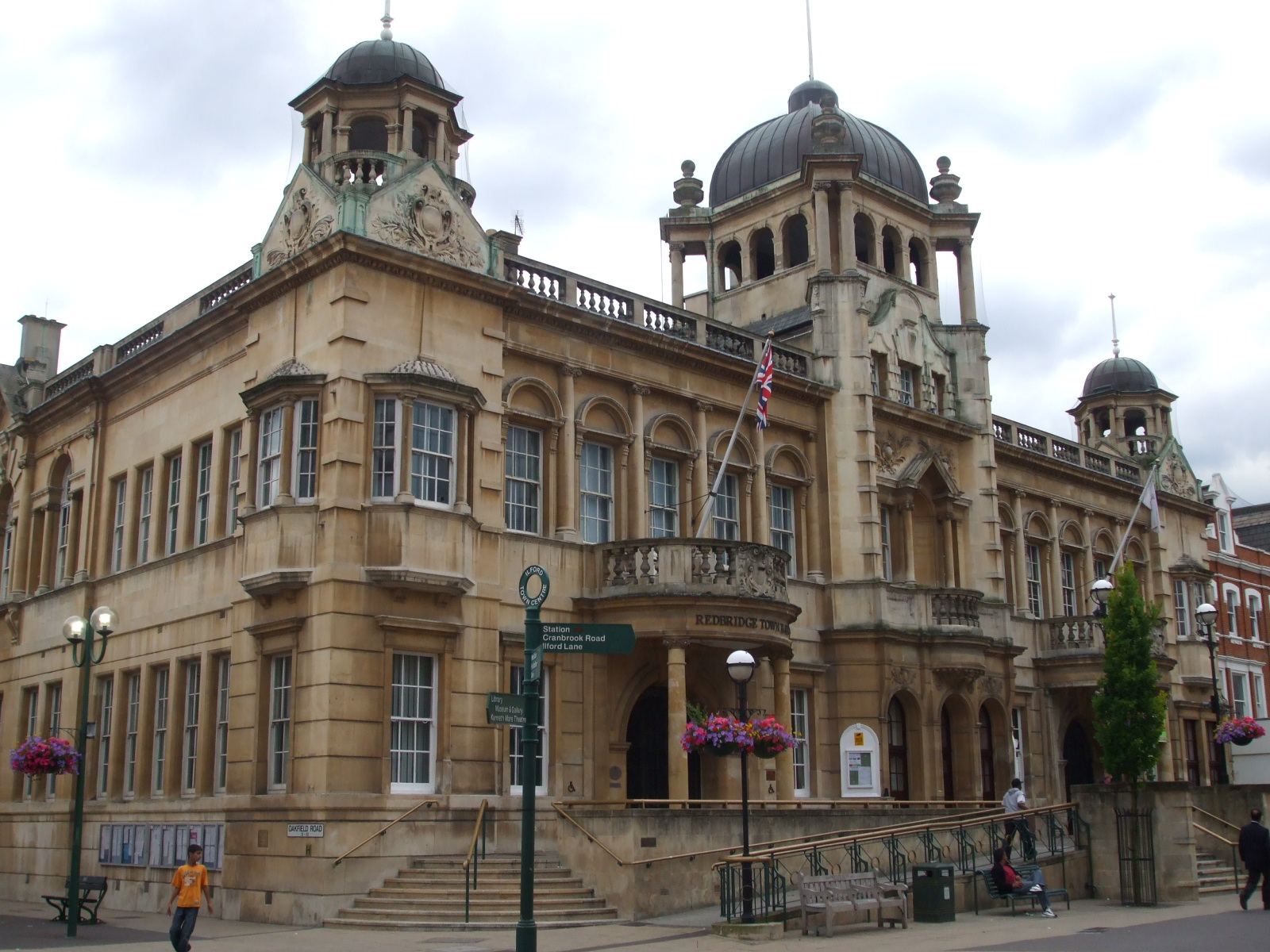
- Redbridge Town Hall, High Road, Ilford, IG1 1DD

Website
- redbridge.gov.uk

Redbridge London Borough Council, also known as Redbridge Council, is the local authority for the London Borough of Redbridge in Greater London, England. The council is responsible for providing certain services within the borough. The council has been under Labour majority control since 2014. The council meets at Redbridge Town Hall in Ilford and has its main offices nearby at Lynton House.

== History ==
The London Borough of Redbridge and its council were created under the London Government Act 1963, with the first election held in 1964. For its first year the council acted as a shadow authority alongside the area's outgoing authorities, being the municipal borough councils of Ilford, Wanstead and Woodford, and Dagenham (the latter in respect of the Hog Hill area only, the rest of that borough went to the London Borough of Barking) and the urban district council of Chigwell in respect of parts of the Hainault area. The new council formally came into its powers on 1 April 1965, at which point the three boroughs and their councils were abolished and the Chigwell Urban District was reduced to remove the Hainault parts.

The council's full legal name is "The Mayor and Burgesses of the London Borough of Redbridge", but it styles itself Redbridge Council.

From 1965 until 1986 the council was a lower-tier authority, with upper-tier functions provided by the Greater London Council. The split of powers and functions meant that the Greater London Council was responsible for "wide area" services such as fire, ambulance, flood prevention, and refuse disposal; with the boroughs (including Redbridge) responsible for "personal" services such as social care, libraries, cemeteries and refuse collection. As an outer London borough council Redbridge has been a local education authority since 1965. The Greater London Council was abolished in 1986 and its functions passed to the London Boroughs, with some services provided through joint committees.

Since 2000 the Greater London Authority has taken some responsibility for highways and planning control from the council, but within the English local government system the council remains a "most purpose" authority in terms of the available range of powers and functions.

== Powers and functions ==
The local authority derives its powers and functions from the London Government Act 1963 and subsequent legislation, and has the powers and functions of a London borough council. It sets council tax and as a billing authority it also collects precepts for Greater London Authority functions and business rates. It sets planning policies which complement Greater London Authority and national policies, and decides on almost all planning applications accordingly. It is also the local education authority.

== Political control ==
The council has been under Labour majority control since 2014.

The first election was held in 1964, initially operating as a shadow authority alongside the outgoing authorities until it came into its powers on 1 April 1965. Political control of the council since 1965 has been as follows:

Party in control	Years
Conservative	1965–1994
No overall control	1994–2002
Conservative	2002–2009
No overall control	2009–2014
Labour	2014–present

=== Leadership ===
The role of Mayor of Redbridge is largely ceremonial. Political leadership is provided by the leader of the council. The leaders since 1965 have been:

Councillor	Party	From	To
Roy Dalton	Conservative	1965	1972
Alexander Escott	Conservative	1972	1974
John Telford	Conservative	1974	1975
Keith Webb	Conservative	1975	1979
Keith Salter	Conservative	1979	1985
John Ramsden	Conservative	1985	1988
John Lovell	Conservative	1988	1991
Ronnie Barden	Conservative	1991	1994
Liz Pearce	Labour	1994	1999
Keith Axon	Conservative	1999	2000
Muhammed Javed	Labour	2000	May 2002
Keith Axon	Conservative	23 May 2002	2 Feb 2003
Allan Burgess	Conservative	20 Mar 2003	20 May 2004
Elaine Norman	Labour	25 May 2004	15 Jul 2004
Laurence Davies	Conservative	15 Jul 2004	May 2006
Alan Weinberg	Conservative	25 May 2006	21 May 2009
Keith Prince (Note: between May 2010 and May 2014, in coalition with the Liberal Democrats)	Conservative	28 May 2009	May 2014
Jas Athwal	Labour	12 Jun 2014	25 Jul 2024
Kam Rai	Labour	25 Jul 2024	

== Elections ==
Since the last boundary changes in 2018 the council has comprised 63 councillors representing 22 wards, with each ward electing two or three councillors. Elections are held every four years.

Following the 2026 election, the composition of the council is:

Party	Councillors
Labour	43
Conservative	5
Green	5
Reform	1
Independent	9
Total	63

One of the independents is described as "Ilford Independents". The next election is due in May 2030.

== Premises ==
The council meets at Redbridge Town Hall, formerly known as Ilford Town Hall, which had been completed in 1901 for the old Ilford Urban District Council, predecessor of Ilford Borough Council.

The council's main offices are at a nearby tower block called Lynton House at 255–259 High Road in Ilford, which was built in 1969.

== Mayors ==
The Mayor of Redbridge is elected by the council annually. The mayor presides over meetings of the council and attends civic and ceremonial functions.

Municipal Year	Mayor	Deputy
1965/66	Sydney Loveless	Charles Loveless, FAIA
1966/67	H.R. Aly	Sydney Loveless
1967/68	Lionel Gooch	H.R. Aly
1968/69	Sydney G. Gleed	L. Fallaize, OBE, JP
1969/70	I.B Natzler	O.F. Walters, JP
1970/71	A.J. Escott, CENG, FIEE	J.W.S. Telford, DFH, CENG, FIEE
1971/72	Charles Loveless, FAIA	D.A. Stephens, FCA, ATII
1972/73	L.G. Bridgeman, JP	Bert Hamilton, FRSA
1973/74	G. Chamberlin, JP	Albert Reynolds
1974/75	J.W.S. Telford, DFH, CENG, FIEE	F.C. Mountier, MIPR, MHCIMA
1975/76	T.F. Cobb, SBStJ, FSCA	E.J. Watts
1976/77	F.C. Mountier, MIPR, MHCIMA	R.C. Brian
1977/78	A.N. Barker	H.G.A. Pearce
1978/79	Bert Hamilton, FRSA	L.G. Bridgeman, JP
1979/80	J.W.S. Telford, DFH, CENG, FIEE	S.G. Curtis, OBE, FlnstB
1980/81	J.M. Clark	J.D. Banyard
1981/82	R.C. Brian	B.E.R. Hamilton, FRSA
1982/83	N.H. Thurgood	S.G. Curtis, OBE, FlnstB
1983/84	S.G. Curtis, OBE, FlnstB	Graham Borrott, AIB
1984/85	J.J.M. Smith, RIBA, FFAS, FRSH, FBID	R.B.R. Hill, FCA
1985/86	R.E. Smith, BA	R.W. Brunnen
1986/87	R.W. Brunnen	D.S. Candy
1987/88	Graham Borrott, AIB	Alan Weinberg
1988/89	Keith Axon, FFA, FIAB, MBIM	Dennis Candy
1989/90	Geoffrey Brewer, TD	Bert Hamilton, FRSA
1990/91	W.J. Roberts	Graham Borrott, AIB
1991/92	R.B.R. Hill, FCA	J.J.M. Smith, RIBA, FFAS, FRSH, FBID
1992/93	Dennis Candy	Alan Weinberg
1993/94	E.J. Watts	Robert Cole, ARICS
1994/95	Linda Perham, BA (Spec.Hons), ALA, JP	John Fairley-Churchill
1995/96	Ronald Barden, BSc (Hons)	Tom Howl
1996/97	Richard Hoskins	Ralph Scott, OMA, MCIPS, Ml Mgt
1997/98	R.E. Golding	Ken Turner, BSC (Econ)
1998/99	John Lovell	Alan Weinberg
1999/00	Filly Maravala	D.R. Sharma
2000/01	Maureen Hoskins, BA (Hons)	Tony Boyland
2001/02	Alan Weinberg	Sue Nolan
2002/03	D.R. Sharma	John Coombes
2003/04	Vanessa Cole	Laurence Davies
2004/05	A. Leggatt	Joyce Ryan
2005/06	Charles Elliman	Morris Hickey
2006/07	Ashok Kumar	Jim O'Shea (18.05.06 - 20.07.06) & Chris Cummins
2007/08	Joyce Ryan	Chris Cummins
2008/09	L. Sladden	Geoff Hinds
2009/10	Tom Chan	Brian Lambert
2010/11	Jim O'Shea	Ruth Clark
2011/12	Chris Cummins	Felicity Banks
2012/13	Mohammed Javed	Elaine Norman
2013/14	Felicity Banks	T. Solomon
2014/15	Ashley Kissin	Linda Huggett
2015/16	B. White	T. Jeya ranjan
2016/17	G. Bhamra	Z. Hussain
2017/18	Linda Huggett	Ashley Kissin
2018/19	D Kaur-Thiara	Taifur Rashid MBE
2019/20	Z. Hussain	Joyce Ryan
2020/21	Z. Hussain	TBA
2021/22	Roy Emmett	Jyotsna Islam
2022/23	T. Jeyaranjan	N. Chaudhry
2023/24	Jyotsna Islam	S. Jamil
2024/25	Sheila Bain	John Howard
