= Bean-feast =

Office party

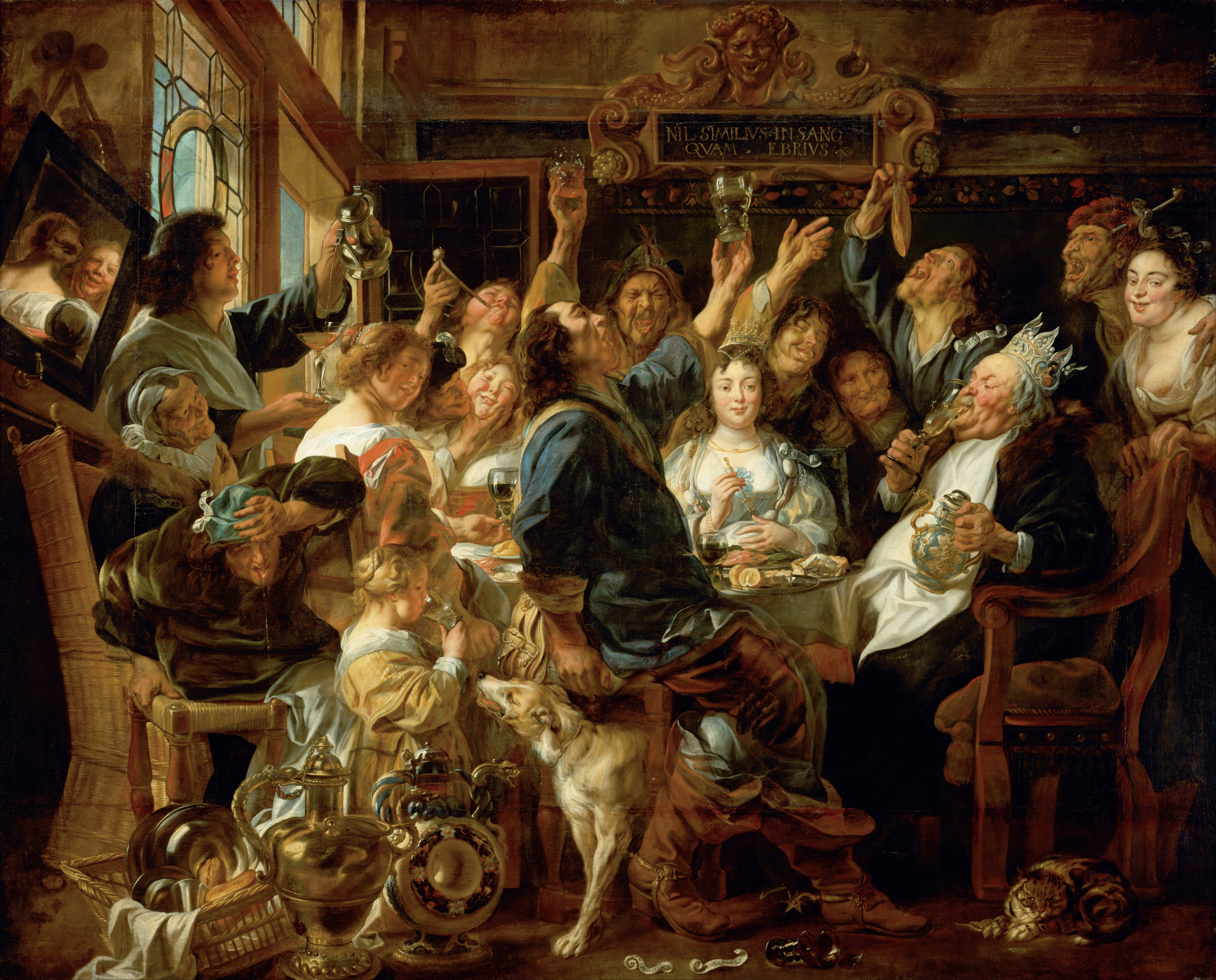
Jacob Jordaens, The Bean King. Oil on canvas, c. 1640–1645.

A bean-feast, also known as beano in Britain, is an informal term for a celebratory meal or party. Historically it referred especially to an annual summer dinner given by an employer to their employees. Its probable origin is the Twelfth Night festival from the Low Countries. By extension, colloquially, it described any festive occasion with a meal and perhaps an outing. An alternative derivation refers the name to the eating of a dish of beans and bacon, and seems to trace to 1725, when Daniel Day of Wapping, London began to entertain friends near his estate at Fairlop in Essex on the first Friday in July.

A goose, which is the raison d’être of the feast, has been dropped out of the name, though a goose was always the staple of the entertainment. A bean goose is a migratory bird, arriving in UK in autumn and going northwards in April. It takes its name from the likeness of the upper part of the bill to a horse-bean.

In the nineteenth and early twentieth centuries, the beanfeast often took the form of a trip to some beauty spot, where the meal was provided.

It is derived from the Twelfth Night feast, at which a king cake or pie with a special object or "favour" buried in it was a great feature. This remains a common custom in much of Europe and former European colonies; in the US mainly in New Orleans. Elsewhere the favour took various forms, including metal tokens and small pottery figures. In the Low Countries a bean was usual. The bean king for the rest of the night was the person who had the slice of cake containing the bean. The king (or queen) was given a paper crown to wear, and appointed various court officials. When the king took a drink, all the party shouted "the king drinks". The subject was often painted by Flemish Baroque and Dutch Golden Age painters, especially Jacob Jordaens and Jan Steen.

== See also ==
- List of dining events
