= Gabriel de Henao =

Gabriel de Henao was a Jesuit and scholar who wrote about the history of his order. He made Ignatius of Loyola out to have been a saint since childhood, caring for the sick in his youth. This portrayal has since been rejected as mere hagiography.
