= Henao =

Henao is a Spanish surname derived from the Spanish name for the Hainaut region. Notable people with the surname include:

- Alexandra Henao (born c. 1970), Venezuelan cinematographer and film director
- Carolina Colorado Henao (born 1987), Colombian swimmer
- Gabriel de Henao (1611–1704), Spanish jesuit and scholar
- Jorge Henão (born 1962), Venezuelan swimmer
- Juan Carlos Henao (born 1971), Colombian footballer
- Mauricio Henao (born 1987), American actor
- Sergio Henao (born 1987), Colombian cyclist
- Zulay Henao (born 1979), Colombian-American actor
