= Hainault, London =

Area of east London

Coordinates: 51.60373°N 0.08751°E

Hainault
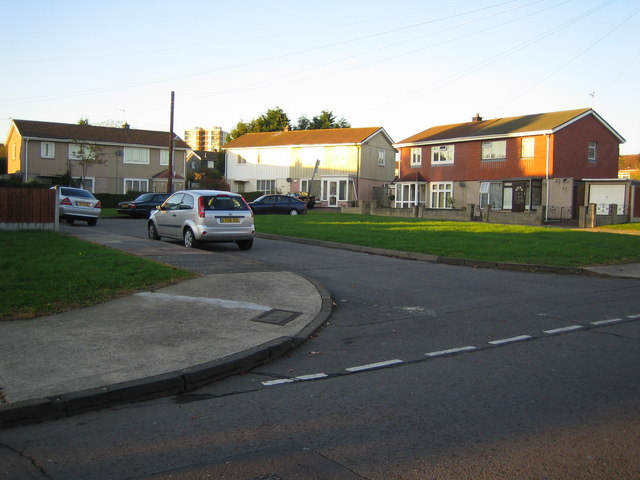
- Housing in Hainault built by the LCC between 1947 and 1953

- Location within Greater London
- Population: 12,953 (2011 Census. Ward)
- OS grid reference: TQ445915
  - Charing Cross: 12.5 mi (20.1 km) SW
- London borough: Redbridge
- Ceremonial county: Greater London
- Region: London
- Country: England
- Sovereign state: United Kingdom
- Post town: ILFORD
- Postcode district: IG6
- Post town: CHIGWELL
- Postcode district: IG7
- Dialling code: 020
- Police: Metropolitan
- Fire: London
- Ambulance: London
- UK Parliament: Ilford North
- London Assembly: Havering and Redbridge

Hainault (/ˈheɪnɔːt/, /-ɒlt/) is a large suburban area of East London, England, in the London Borough of Redbridge, 12.5 miles (20.1 km) northeast of Charing Cross. Most of the housing in Hainault was built by the London County Council between 1947 and 1953. Originally spanning the parishes of Chigwell, Dagenham, and Ilford, in 1965 the estate was combined in a single London borough and became part of Greater London.

It is adjacent to the Metropolitan Green Belt, bordered on the east by Hainault Forest Country Park and to the north by open land and the boundary with the Epping Forest District of Essex. The area is served by London Underground's Central Line.

== History ==
=== Toponymy ===
The name Hainault was recorded as 'Henehout' in 1221 and 'Hyneholt' in 1239. It is Old English and means 'wood belonging to a religious community', referring to the ownership of Hainault Forest by Barking Abbey. The spelling was altered from the 17th century to its modern form owing to an imagined but false connection to Philippa of Hainault, the wife and queen of Edward III.

=== Development ===
The area was mainly forested. It was owned by the nuns of Barking Abbey and formed part of the Forest of Essex. The area's timber was predominantly used for building ships and houses. A decline in demand for timber, and a greater demand for food, led in 1851 to an Act of Parliament authorising the deforestation of much of Hainault Forest. Within six weeks 3,000 acres of woodland was cleared.

Urban development began after August 1856, when the Great Eastern Railway built a line between Stratford and Loughton. In 1903, from the line at Woodford Junction, a loop line to Ilford was opened. Hainault was one of the stations on that line.

Although it had been hoped that housing development would follow from the building of the railway, it took several decades. Hainault station was closed from 1908, five years after opening; development began in the late 1920s, and the station was reopened in 1930. As a result of the London Passenger Transport Board New Works Programme 1935–40 (not completed until 1948) the line was taken over from the LNER and converted for use by London Underground trains.

Because of the lack of available land in the County of London, the London County Council (LCC) was permitted to build housing and act as landlord outside of its territory. It purchased land in Chigwell, Dagenham, and Ilford in 1943. Building of the Hainault Estate commenced after the Second World War from 1947 to 1953. The development of 2,779 houses was in the style known as a 'cottage estate' with the names of the roads relating to the history of Hainault Forest.

=== Local government ===
After the development of the Hainault Estate, the area was within three local government districts. Most of Hainault was split between the Chigwell Urban District and the Municipal Borough of Ilford, with a small part to the east within the Municipal Borough of Dagenham. The population of the Chigwell part of the estate was 7,071 in 1961.

The whole area formed part of the review area of the Royal Commission on Local Government in Greater London. It was recommended by the commission that the three districts should become part of Greater London. During the passage of the London Government Act 1963, Chigwell became excluded from the new administrative area, which would have led to the estate being split by a county boundary. Instead, the opportunity was taken to unite the estate in a single London Borough of Redbridge, by combining the 81 acres (0.3 km^{2}) of the estate in Chigwell with the northern section of Dagenham and the whole of the boroughs of Ilford and Wanstead and Woodford.

== Government ==
Three councillors are elected to represent the Hainault ward on Redbridge London Borough Council.

== Geography ==
For postal addresses, it is split between the Chigwell and Ilford post towns in the IG postcode area. It is within the London 020 telephone area code, with the Hainault telephone exchange located just outside the Greater London boundary in Grange Hill.

Nearest places are Goodmayes, Chigwell, Collier Row, Barkingside and Chadwell Heath.

== Demographics ==
The largest ethnic group in the Hainault ward of Redbridge in the 2011 census was White British, at 60.7% of the population. This was followed by Other White at 8.4% of the population and Black African at 5.7%.

55.9% of the population identified as Christians, with 8.6% of the population identifying as Muslim and 7% not stating a religion.

== Transport ==
The nearest London Underground stations are Hainault and Grange Hill on the Central line. The area is directly served by London bus routes 150, 247, 362, 462, and N8.

== Sport ==
Hainault Athletic Football Club were formed in the Summer of 2005, they started playing in the Independent Sunday League where in their first season they won the Independent Sunday League Division 3 title and the Division 3 Cup.

The Club then joined the Essex Sunday League Combination where they were Division 2 Runners up.

The Club now play in the Essex Sunday Corinthian League.

Manford Way FC was formed in 1946 (known during the first year as Chigwell Labour Club). They played on a field opposite Grange Crescent, near Grange Hill Station, now houses; the club currently play in the Essex Olympian League. Manford Way is the main road that runs through the Hainault Estate.
