= Hainault Lodge =

Nature reserve in Hainault, London, England

Coordinates: 51.6065°N 0.1300°E

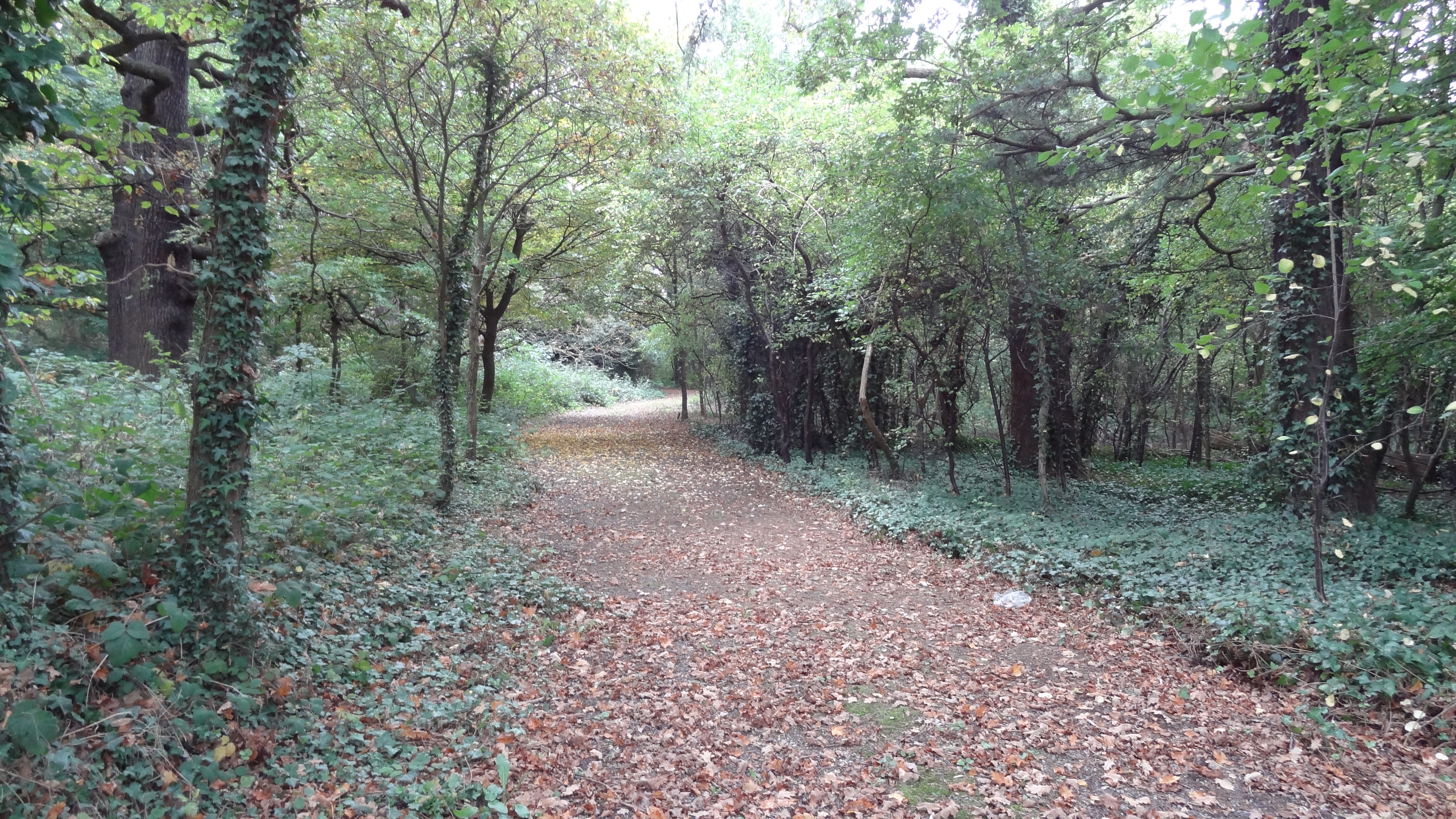

Hainault Lodge is a Local Nature Reserve in Hainault, in the London Borough of Redbridge.

== History ==
The 6.8-hectare (17-acre) site is a small remnant of the once much larger Hainault Forest, and named after a house which was built in 1851 and demolished in 1973. In 1986 the site was acquired by Redbridge Council who manage the site. It was then so overgrown that it was inaccessible, and in 1990 volunteers started to help maintain it.

In 1995 it was designated a Local Nature Reserve, the only one in the borough.

== Ecology ==
The site is a mixture of pasture and woodland. Birds include long-tailed tits, robins, great spotted and green woodpeckers, and there are orange tip and speckled wood butterflies. Plants include butcher's broom, foxgloves and red campion. A disused boiler room has been converted into a bat hibernaculum.

== Location ==
The reserve is at the corner of Forest Road and Romford Road, but the entrance gate in Forest Road is locked and there is no public access.
