= Municipal Borough of Wanstead and Woodford =

Former local government area in the UK

Coordinates: 51.592°N 0.030°E

Wanstead and Woodford
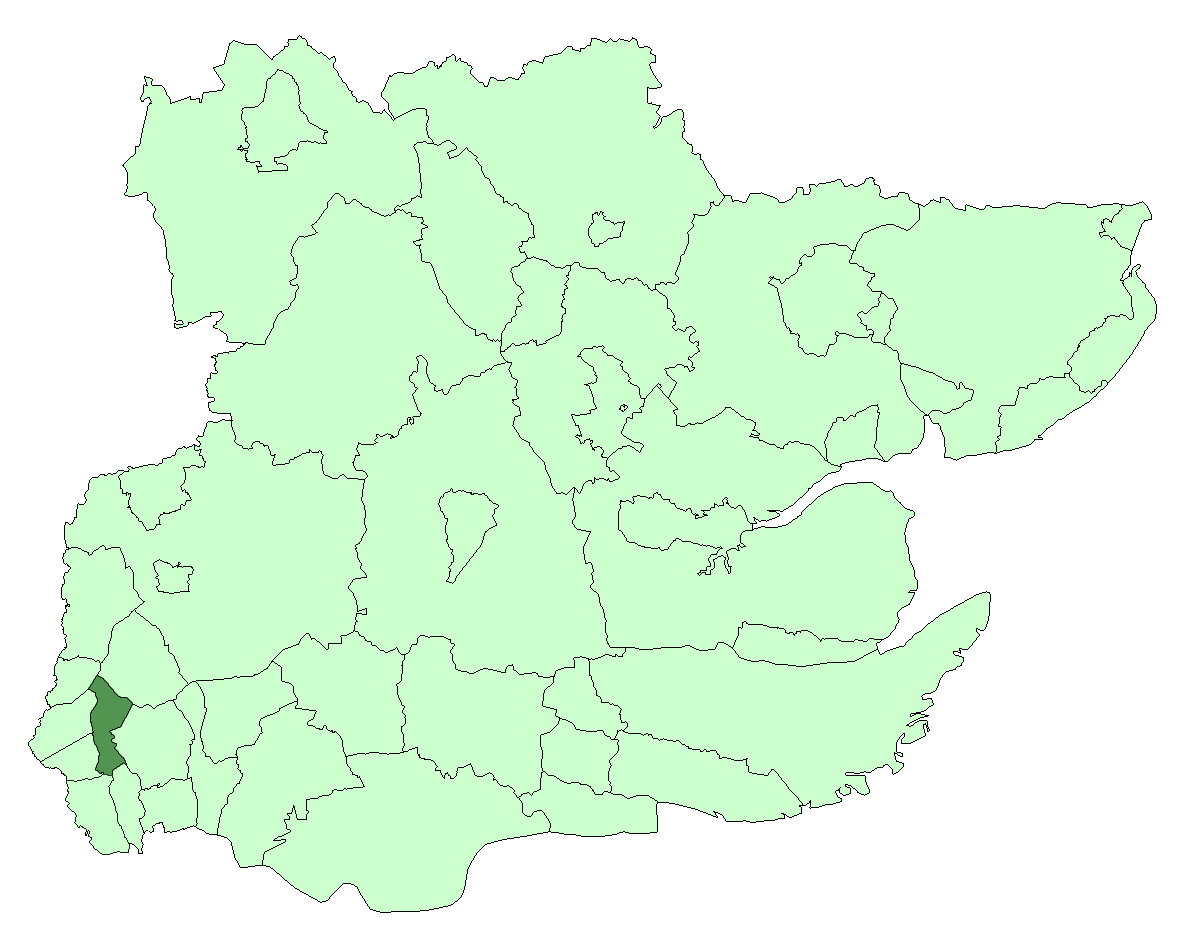
- Wanstead and Woodford within Essex in 1961
- Area
  - 1934: 3,842 acres (15.5 km^{2})
  - 1965: 3,864 acres (15.6 km^{2})
- Population
  - 1939: 44,057
  - 1961: 61,416
- History
  - Created: 1934
  - Abolished: 1965
  - Succeeded by: London Borough of Redbridge
- Status: Urban district (until 1937); Municipal borough (after 1937)
- Coat of Arms

Wanstead and Woodford was a local government district from 1934 to 1965 in southwest Essex, England. A merger of two former urban districts, it was suburban to London and part of the Metropolitan Police District.

== Background ==
A local board of health was set up for the parish of Wanstead in 1854. The Local Government Act 1894 reconstituted its area as Wanstead Urban District, governed by Wanstead Urban District Council.

Woodford parish adopted the Local Government Act 1858 in 1873, setting up a local board. In 1894 it became Woodford Urban District, governed by Woodford Urban District Council.

In 1934, as part of a county review order, a new urban district was created as a merger of their areas.

== District and borough ==
The urban district was incorporated as a municipal borough in 1937. The charter was presented by the Prince Henry, Duke of Gloucester on 14 October of that year while the ceremonial mace was presented by Winston Churchill, Member of Parliament for the area.

In 1956 the municipal borough was enlarged by gaining 23 acres (93,000 m^{2}) from the Municipal Borough of Ilford while 2 acres (8,100 m^{2}) were transferred the other way.

== Abolition ==
In 1965, under the London Government Act 1963, the municipal borough was abolished and its former area transferred to Greater London and combined with that of other districts to form the London Borough of Redbridge.

== Meeting place ==
The old rectory at St Mary's Woodford was converted into a meeting place for the council in 1937 and became known as Wanstead and Woodford Town Hall. After being used as a magistrates court from 1968 to 1988, the building was demolished and the site redeveloped for residential use.
