= Hainau =

Hainau may refer to:

- Chojnów, Poland, Hainau in German
- Hainau, Germany, in Rhein-Lahn-Kreis, Rhineland-Palatinate
- The County of Hainaut, as spelled in the oldest documents
