= Hainault Forest =

Natural area in Greater London and Essex, England

- Site of Special Scientific Interest
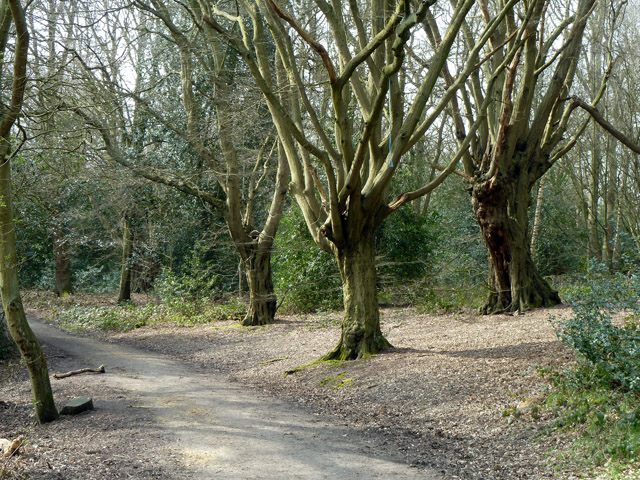
- Hornbeam pollards in Hainault Forest
- Location of Hainault Forest.
- Area of search: Greater London
- Grid reference: TQ477938
- Coordinates: 51°37′18″N 0°7′45″E
- Interest: Biological
- Area: 135.31 ha (334.4 acres)
- Notification date: 1986
- Location map: Magic Map

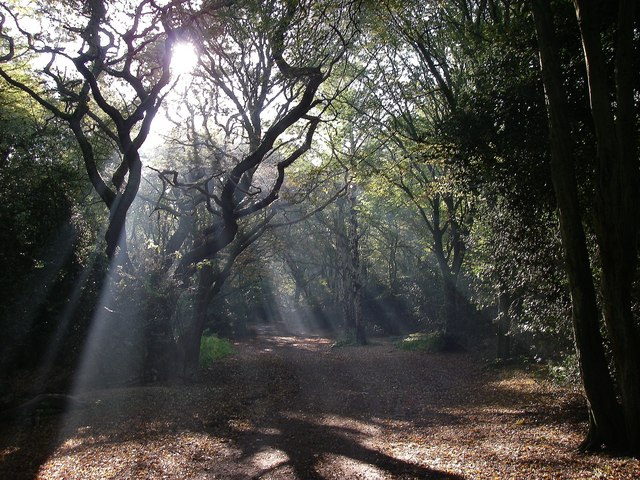
The footpath into Hainault Forest from Lambourne End, on a November morning

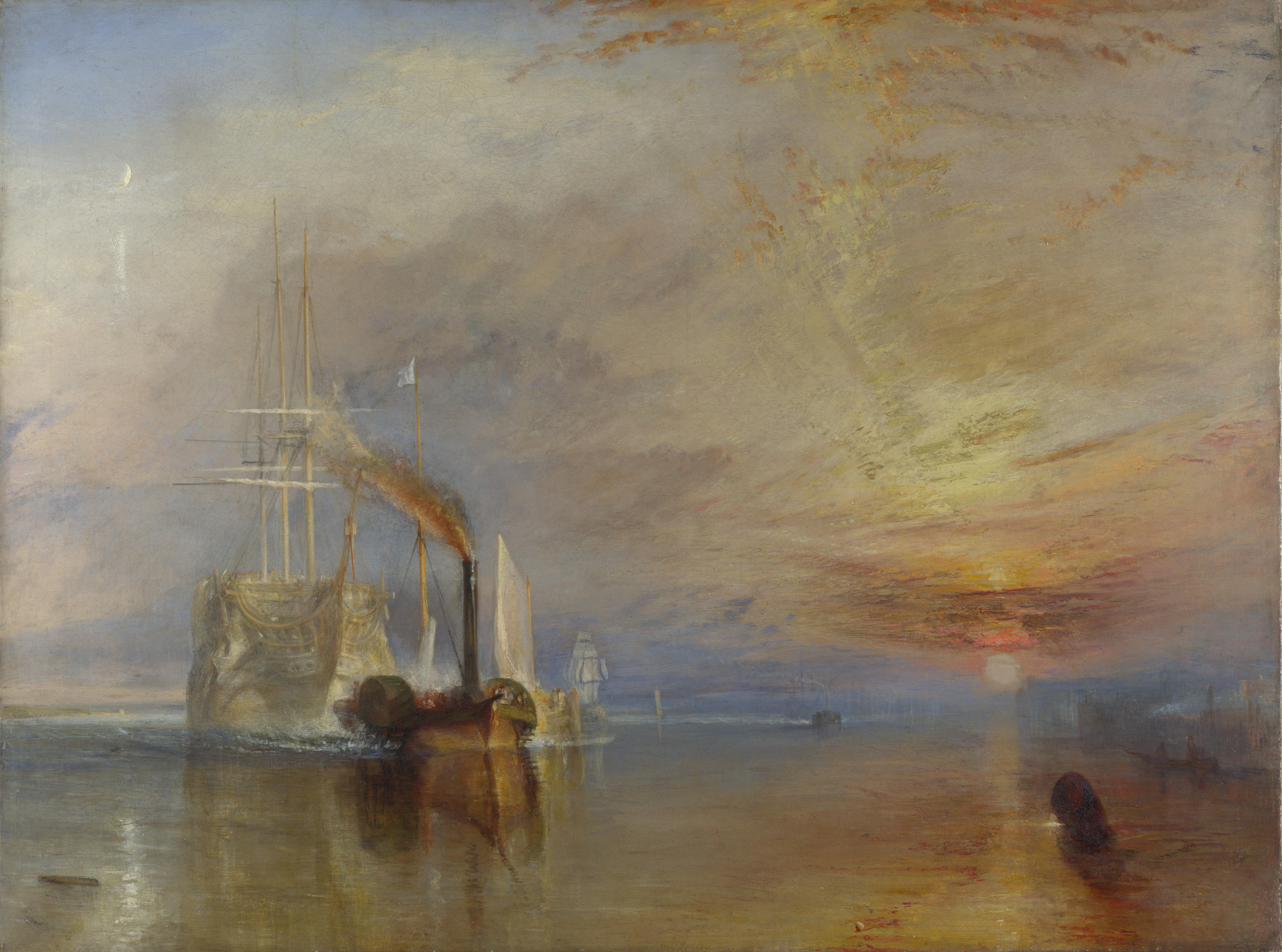
The Fighting Temeraire, painted by J. M. W. Turner. HMS Temeraire was made from oaks harvested from Hainault Forest.

Hainault Forest was a large wooded area in the English counties of Essex and Greater London which was mostly destroyed after 1851. Popular outrage at the destruction of most of the forest was an important catalyst for the creation of the modern environmental movement.

Less than a tenth of the original forest survives, with many of the surviving fragments managed as a part of Hainault Forest Country Park. The country park also includes other habitats.

The country park is located on the edge of Greater London, with portions in the London Borough of Redbridge, the London Borough of Havering, and the Lambourne parish of the Epping Forest District in Essex.

== Geography ==
With an area of 135.31 hectares (334.4 acres), Hainault Forest Country Park has been designated a Site of Special Scientific Interest.

The Redbridge section of the park is managed by Vision Redbridge on behalf of Redbridge Council. Across the border, the Essex section is managed by the Woodland Trust, who hold a long-term lease for the management by its owners, Essex County Council.

Hainault Forest is one of the three forests of west Essex alluded to in the Three Forests Way. This is a 59-mile (95 km) long-distance circular path which passes through Hainault Forest, Epping Forest and Hatfield Forest.

== History ==
=== Origin and toponymy ===
The first recorded use of the name is as Henehout in 1221, and then Hyneholt in 1239. The name comes from two place name elements; higna and holt, which translates into modern English as Community Woodland, with the community referred to being the ancient female monastic community of Barking Abbey, which held the huge Manor of Barking, of which most of Hainault Forest, along with the rest of Ilford, were then a part.

Hainault Forest therefore means "Monastic Community Woodland Forest". The modern spelling of Hainault is first recorded in 1590, and is due to a fictitious connection with Queen Philippa of Hainault, the wife of King Edward III. The old spelling continued in parallel with the more fashionable modern spelling for many years.

=== Extent ===
The Chapman and Andre map of 1777 shows the Forest extending west to Barkingside and Claybury, north to Chigwell Row, south-east to Collier Row. In a survey made for Henry VIII in 1544 its extent was some 3,000 acres (12 km^{2}).

=== Forest Law ===
The area is thought to have been given legal status as a royal forest by Henry II in the 12th century. At the time it was part of the much larger Forest of Essex, which covered nearly all of the county. The word Forest was a legal term, meaning that Forest Law applied, that only the King had the right to hunt deer. The term did not mean the land was well wooded: most of the Forest of Essex was agricultural land.

The Forest of Essex gradually shrank in size as land was removed from Forest Law and it was replaced by a number of much smaller forests including Waltham Forest (which gives its name to the modern London Borough of Waltham Forest). Waltham Forest was a legally defined area which included the areas later known as Hainault Forest and Epping Forest; the rest of the Waltham Forest area was only lightly wooded. The place name Waltham Forest had passed out of use by the end of the seventeenth century.

=== Common rights and management ===
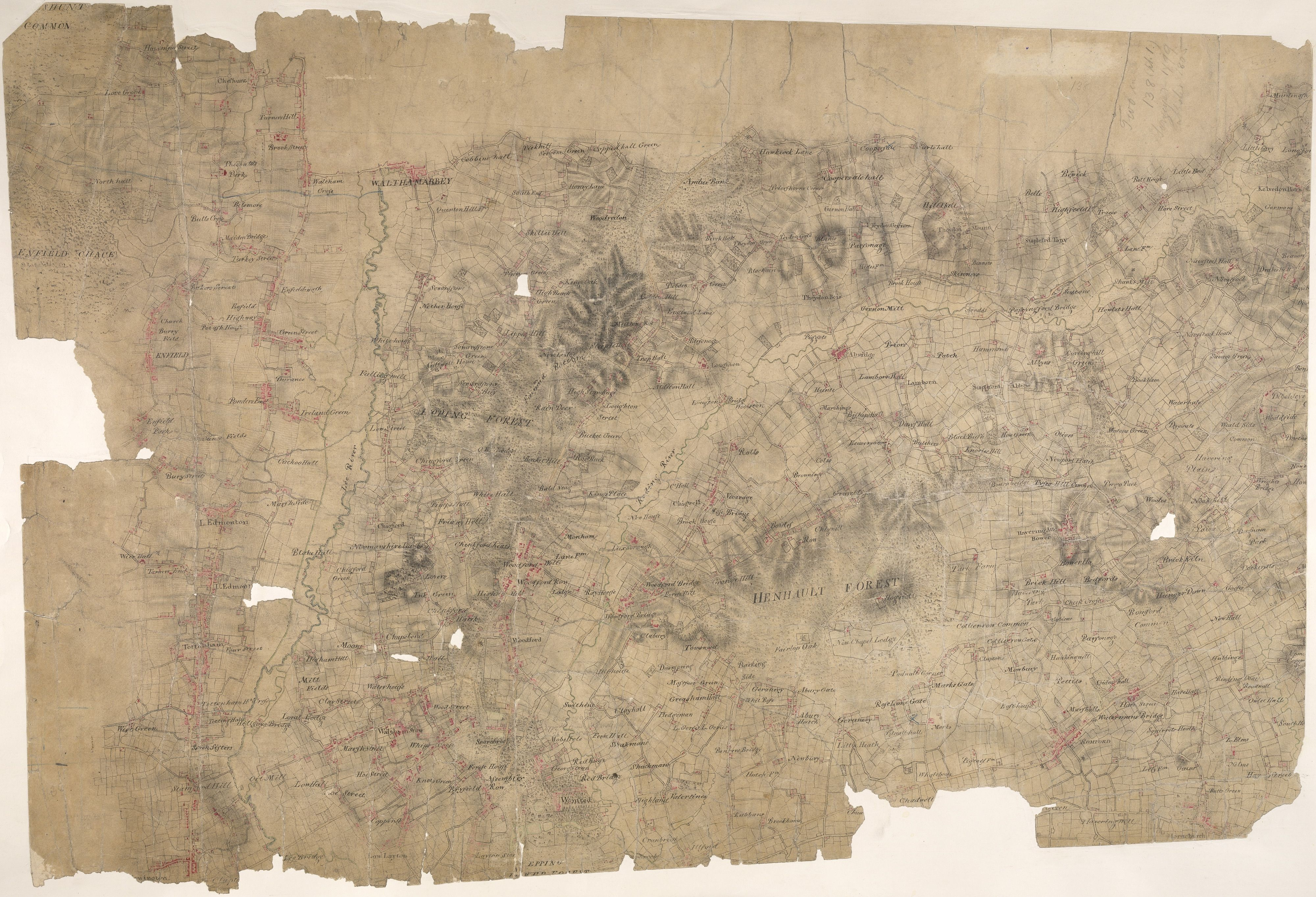
Ordnance Survey drawing of the Forest, around 1805

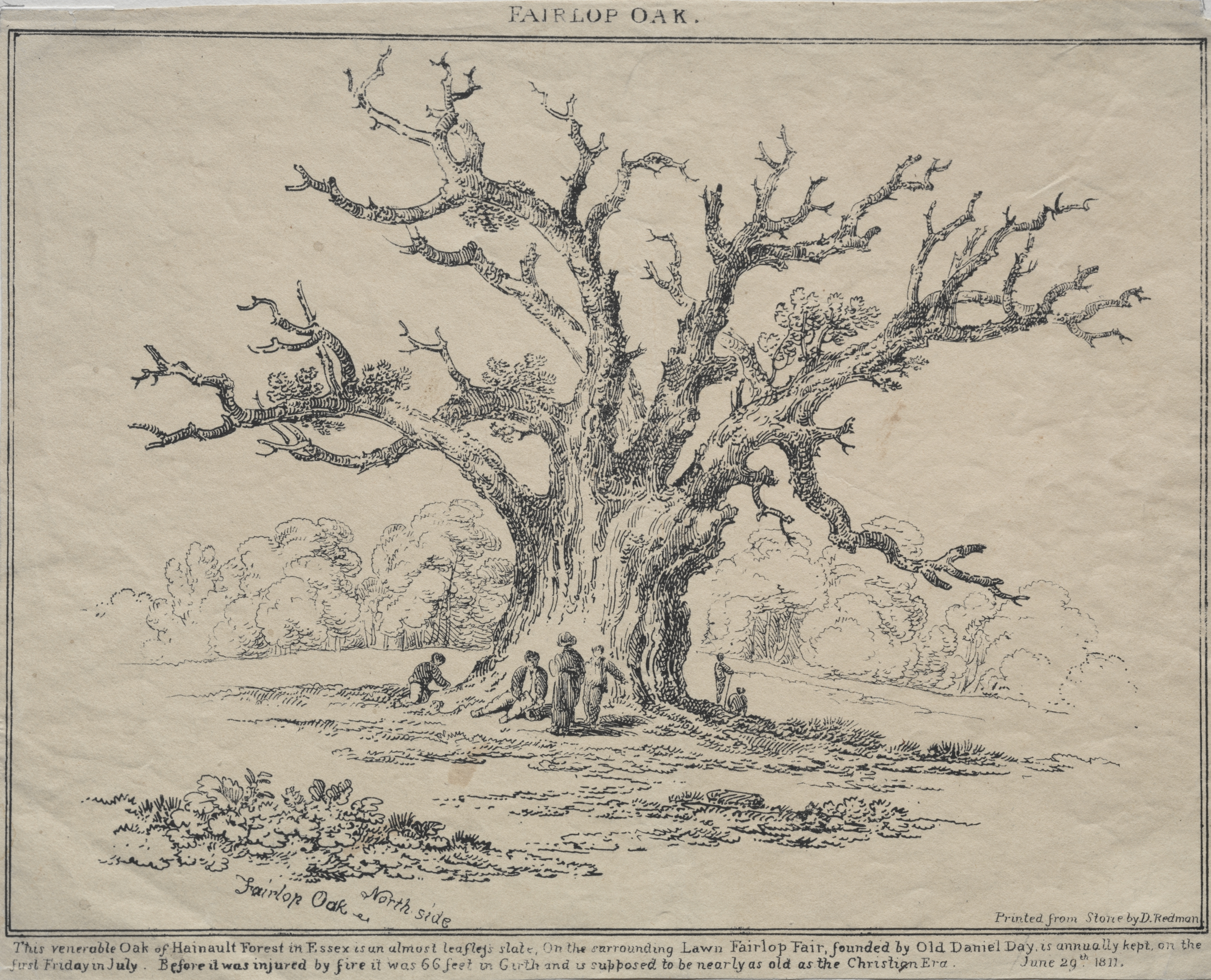
The Fairlop Oak, around 1812

Although the monarch held hunting and associated rights, most of the forest was part of the Manor of Barking, which was held by the nuns of abbey of Barking until the Dissolution of the Monasteries;

It was managed as a common where the landowner benefitted from certain rights, with local commoners benefitted from common rights such as pollarding and grazing.

The landscape was primarily wood-pasture, with the pollarding of trees allowing enough light to reach the ground so there was enough grass and other growth to allow cattle to graze. The Chapman and Andre map of Essex (1777) indicates there was a large open area in the centre-east, and open common land and a little coppice woodland around the periphery.

Oaks from the Forest were harvested to build ships for the Royal Navy, most notably HMS Temeraire (launched in 1798), which was famous for its role in the Battle of Trafalgar. The harvesting of trees to build warships did not lead to deforestation.

=== Dissolution of Barking Abbey ===
The nunnery of Barking Abbey, established in the 7th century by St Erkenwald, was suppressed by Henry VIII in 1539, and its assets seized, during the dissolution of the monasteries. The Forest passed to the Crown with the King therefore enjoying the rights of the landowner as well as the royal forest rights he already enjoyed. The Forest was sometimes also known as Kingswood after this change. Common rights appear to have continued unchanged.

=== Leisure ===
The Forest was a popular leisure resource for East Enders especially at the time of the annual Fairlop Fair, held on the first Friday of July beside the famous Fairlop Oak. The Fair was founded in 1725, by Daniel Day, a marine engineer from Wapping. Day began the fair as a benefit for his workers - they dined on beans and bacon, and this may be the origin of the English words bean-feast and beano. The occasion quickly grew and eventually crowds of 200,000 or more would come to the fair. After the forest was largely destroyed, the fair continued at nearby Barkingside, with the last gathering of any size occurring in 1900.

=== Destruction ===
Hainault Forest Act 1851
- Act of Parliament
- Parliament of the United Kingdom
- Long title: An Act for disafforesting the forest of Hainault in the county of Essex.
- Citation: 14 & 15 Vict. c. 43
- Territorial extent: United Kingdom

Dates
- Royal assent: 1 August 1851
- Commencement: 1 August 1851 (Note: The Acts of Parliament (Commencement) Act 1793.)
- Repealed: 1 July 1971
Other legislation
Repealed by	Crown Estate Act 1961; Wild Creatures and Forest Laws Act 1971

Status: Repealed

Text of statute as originally enacted

The forest land, which had previously been managed as a common, was enclosed (privatised) following an act of Parliament, the Hainault Forest Act 1851 (14 & 15 Vict. c. 43). The deer were removed, the trees grubbed out using machines specially designed for the purpose, and 92-96% of the forest converted to farmland. The land became marginal agricultural land and subsequently a significant proportion has been built on. The destruction was deplored by Sir Walter Besant in his works on London: the forest is also the setting for his novel All in a Garden Fair.

Oliver Rackham described how the outrage at the destruction of Hainault led to the establishment of the modern conservation movement with the creation of conservation groups which successfully opposed such a fate happening to Hainault's "sister forest", Epping Forest.

The campaign to save Epping Forest, in which ordinary East Londoners played a major role, has been described as "the first major victory, in Europe, for the modern conservation movement".

=== Preservation of the remnant ===
After public pressure to retain some remnant of Hainault Forest, headed by Edward North Buxton, a total of 804 acres (3.3 km^{2}) of land was bought for public use on 21 July 1906. It included 253 acres (1.0 km^{2}) of woodland and rough pasture.

Hainault Forest Country Park protected areas include: open space parklands — with numerous public footpaths and a large lake; Hainault Forest Golf Club; and Foxburrows Farm — which is used in part for preserving rare breeds of animals.

Much of the remainder of the remnant, or the formerly forested area is built up, or consists of poor quality arable land. Other formerly forested areas are managed as public open spaces such as Fairlop Waters Country Park, Hainault Recreation Ground, Hainault Lodge Nature Reserve, Hainault Forest Golf Club and the Redbridge Cycling Centre at Hog Hill.

There have been calls for non-urbanised part of the former forest area - especially the agricultural parts - to be rewilded, especially where that links surviving areas of wildlife rich habitat.

== Gallery ==
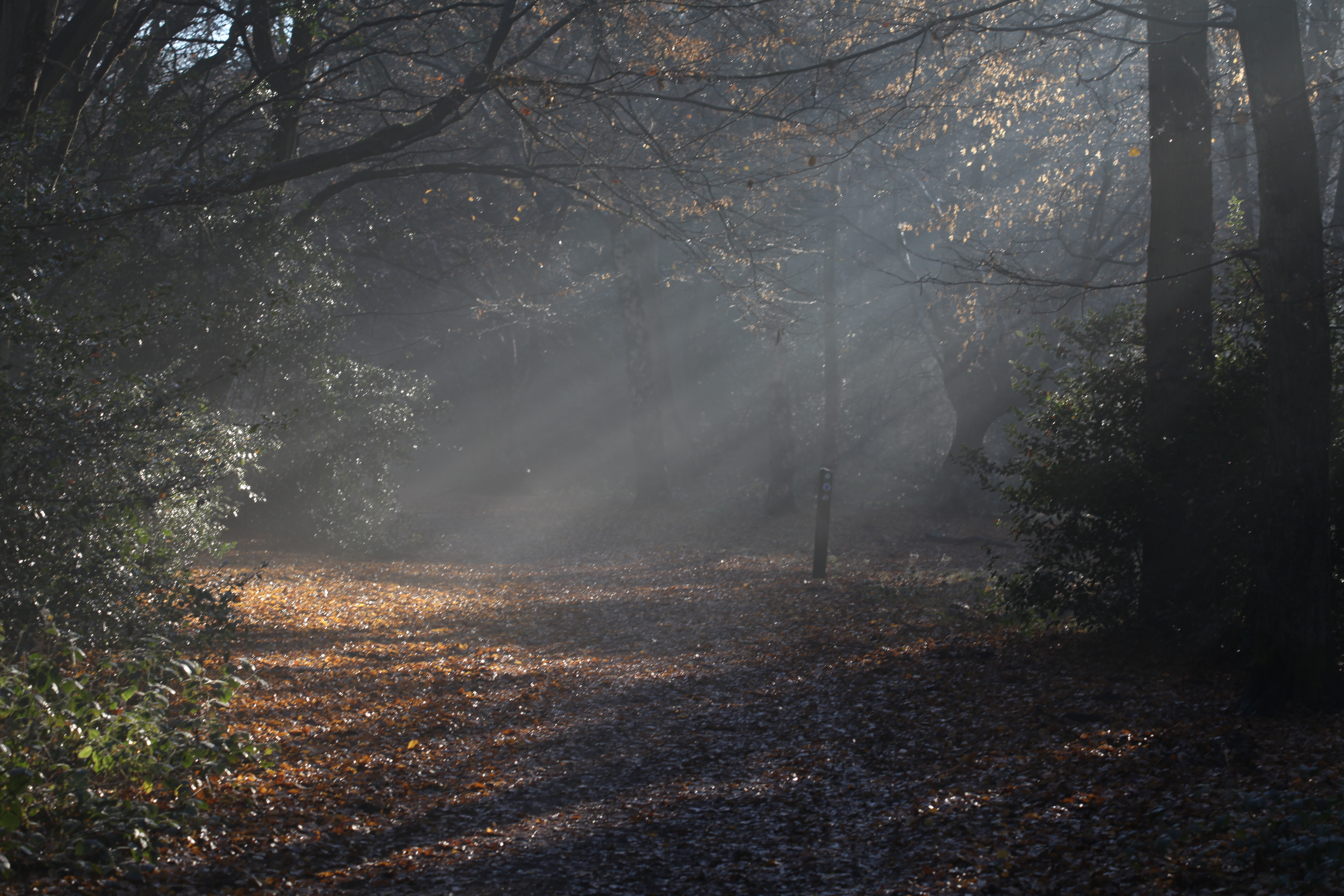
Hainault Forest on a misty November morning 2013

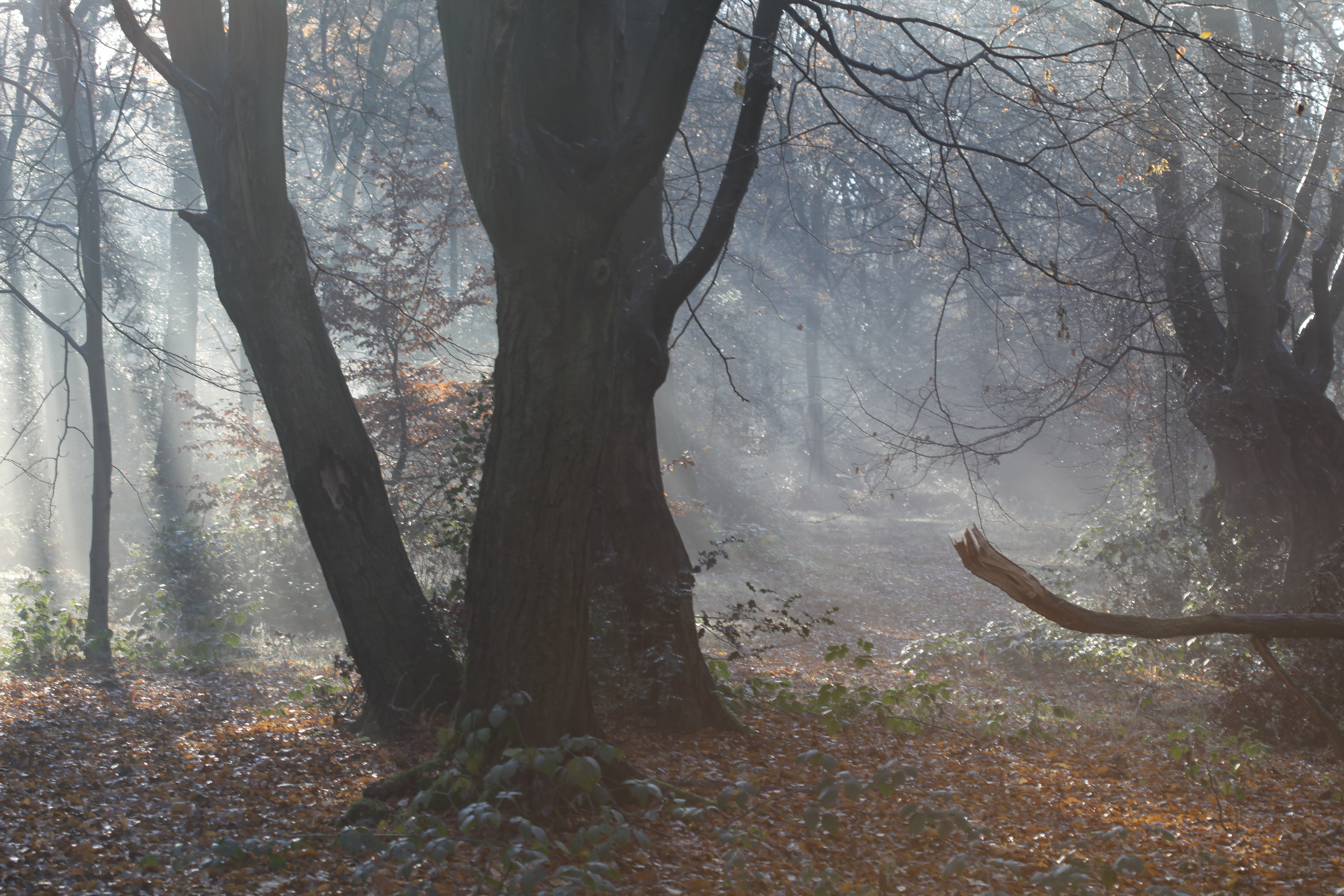
Hainault Forest on a misty November morning 2013

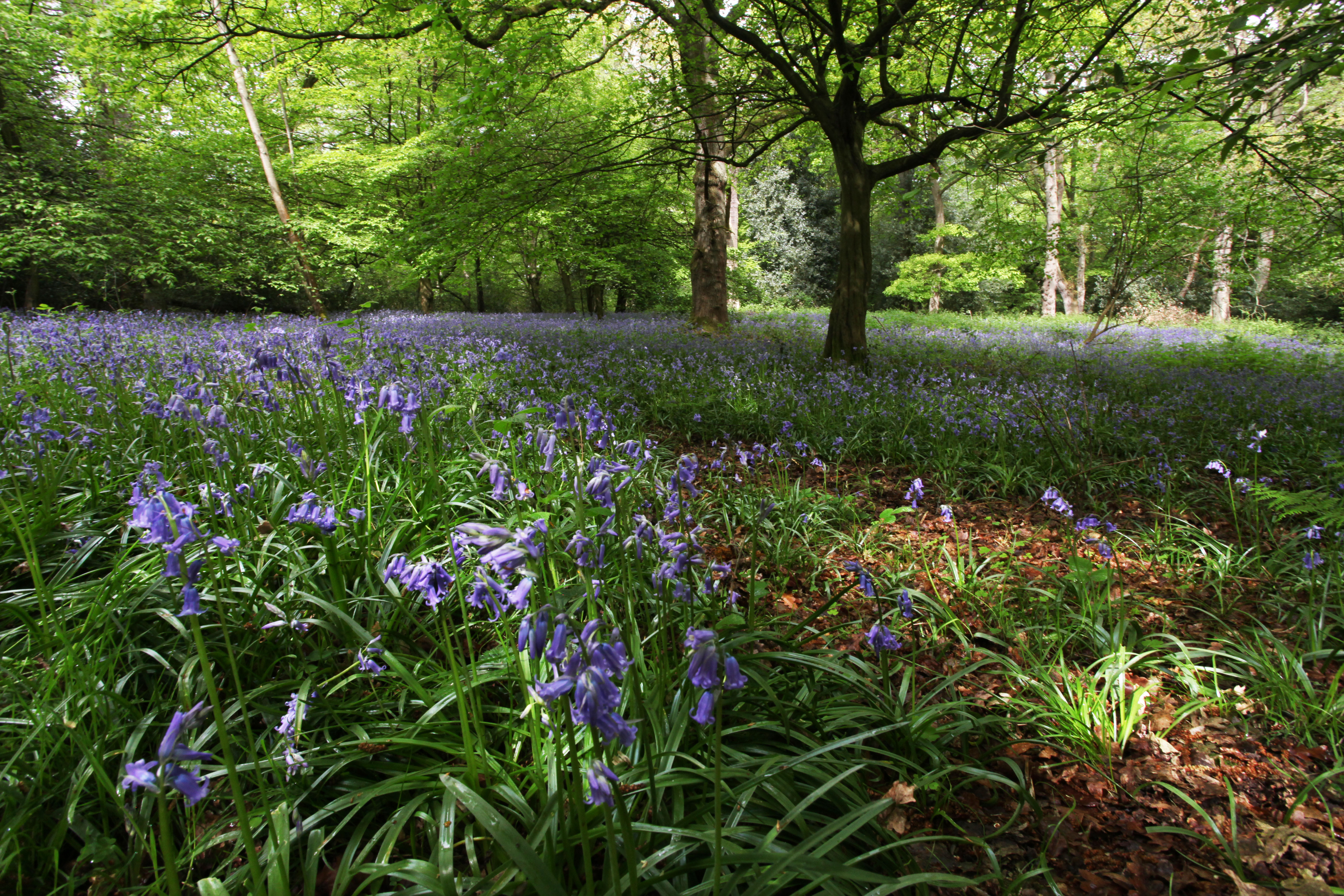
Bluebells in late April, 2014

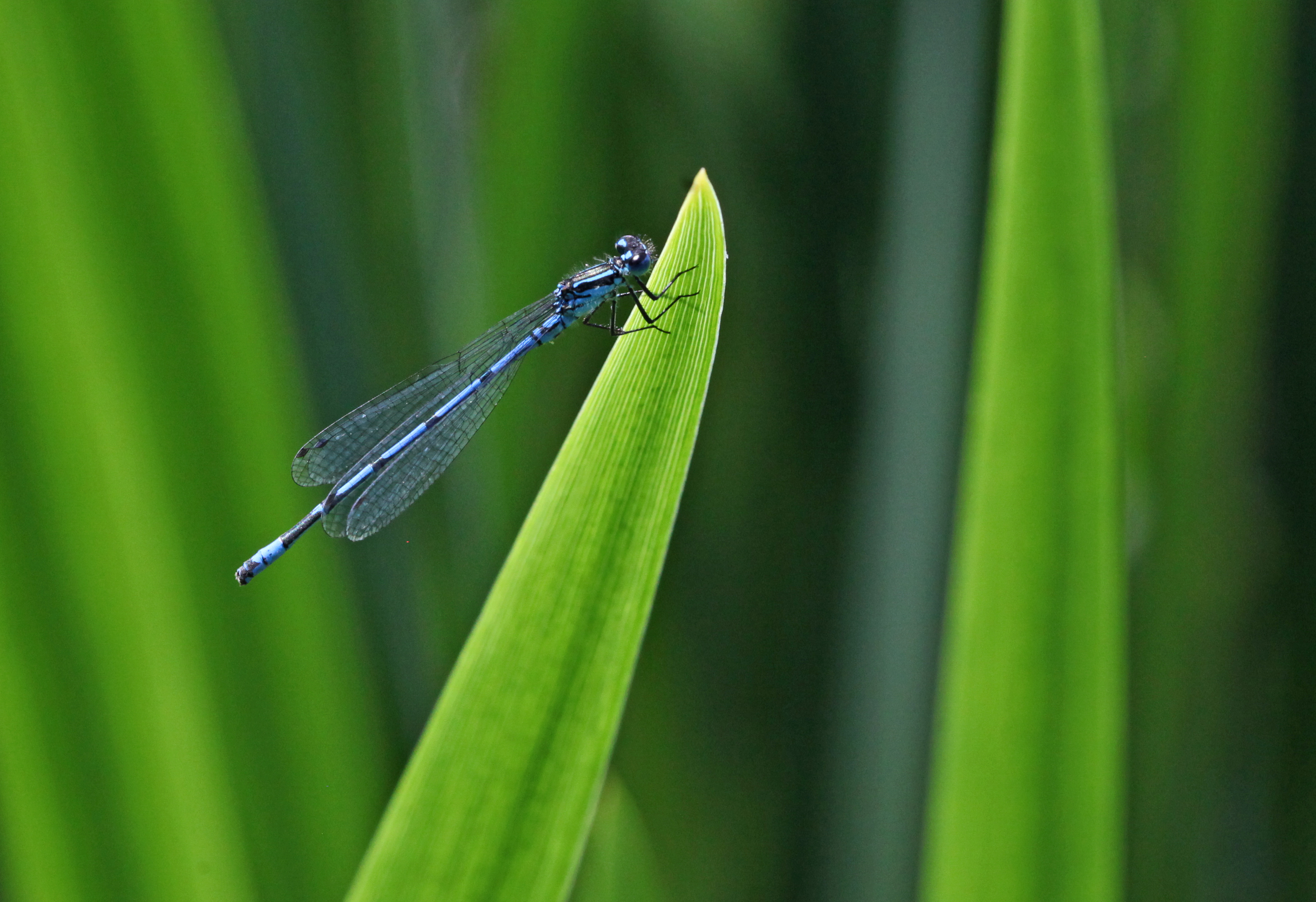
Damselfly on reeds at the Lake, June 2014

== See also ==
- List of Sites of Special Scientific Interest in Greater London
- List of Sites of Special Scientific Interest in Essex
