= Municipal Borough of Ilford =

District in Essex, England

Coordinates: 51.56°N 0.07°E

Ilford
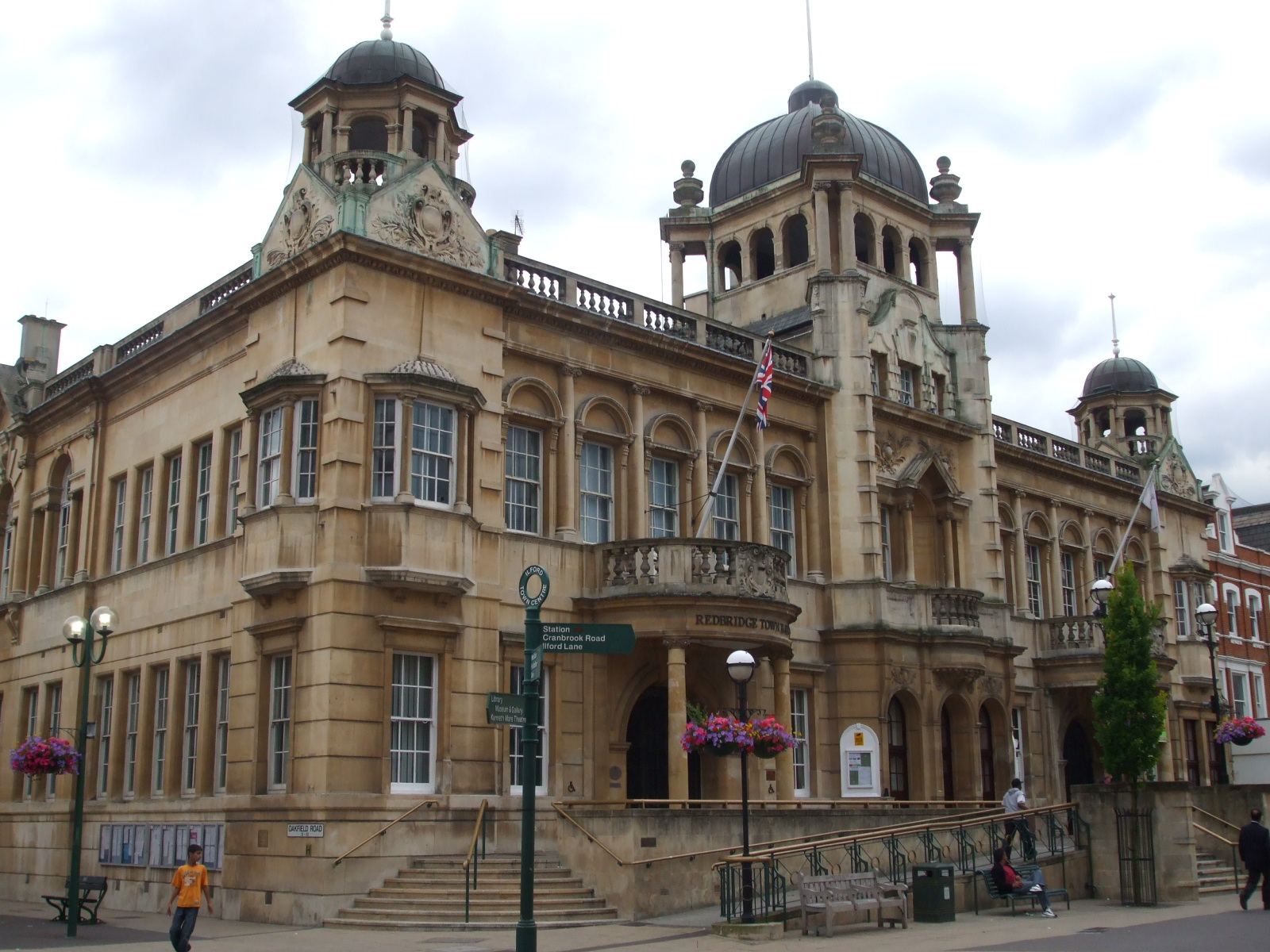
- Ilford (now Redbridge) Town Hall

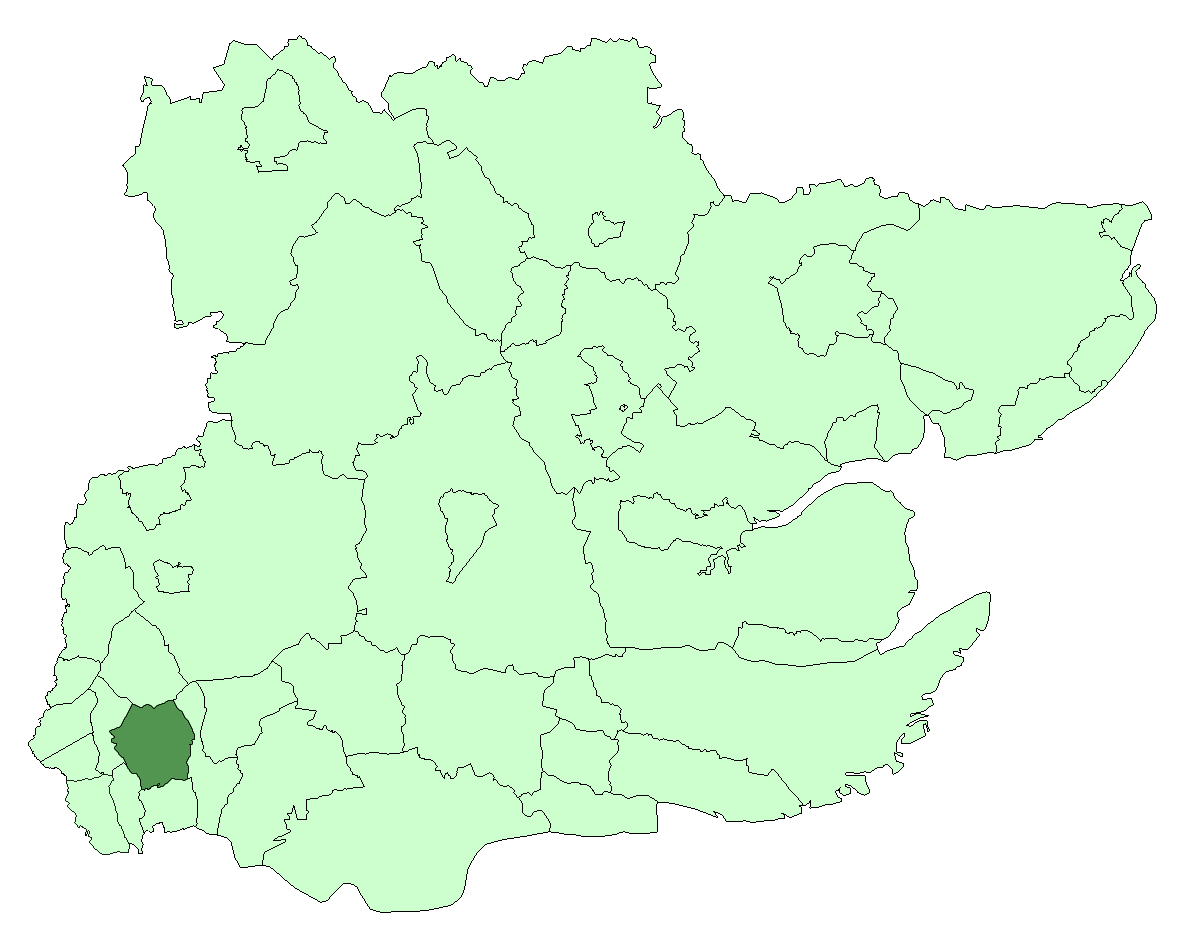
- Ilford within Essex in 1961
- Area
  - 1911: 8,496 acres (34.38 km^{2})
  - 1931: 8,493 acres (34.37 km^{2})
  - 1961: 8,404 acres (34.01 km^{2})
- Population
  - 1911: 78,188
  - 1931: 131,061
  - 1961: 178,024
- Density
  - 1911: 9.2/acre
  - 1931: 15.4/acre
  - 1961: 21.2/acre
- History
  - Origin: Chadwell and Ilford wards of Barking parish
  - Created: 1888
  - Abolished: 1965
  - Succeeded by: London Borough of Redbridge
- Status: Civil parish (1888—1965); Local board (1890—1894); Urban district (1894—1926); Municipal borough (1926—1965)
- Government
  - HQ: Ilford
  - Motto: In unity progress
- Achievement of arms of the Borough Council

Ilford was a local government district in south-west Essex, England from 1890 to 1965, covering the town of Ilford. The district saw a considerable rise in population throughout its existence, caused by the expansion of the built-up area of London, and became one of the most populous districts of its type in England. The district now corresponds to the greater part of the London Borough of Redbridge in Greater London.

== Formation ==
A map showing the wards of Barking Civil Parish as they appeared in 1871.

Ilford or Great Ilford had historically formed one of the four wards of the ancient parish of Barking, the others being Chadwell, Ripple, and Barking Town. The area had formed part of the Metropolitan Police District since 1840. In 1888 the Ilford and Chadwell wards were made into a new civil parish called Ilford.

In 1890, two years after its creation, the Ilford civil parish was also made a local government district, administered by an elected local board. Such districts were reconstituted as urban districts under the Local Government Act 1894.

== District and borough ==
The Urban District Council was originally based in rooms above a shop in Cranbrook Road, meeting in a rented schoolroom in Ilford Hall from 1898. The building of Ilford Town Hall began in 1901, completed at a cost of about £30,000. This was designed by B. Woollard in an ornate Renaissance style; it was enlarged in 1927 and 1933.

Successive acts provided the council with increased powers and they used these to embark on an expansion of public services, providing sewerage, public baths, an isolation hospital, a fire station, an electricity and tramway undertaking, and several public parks – including Valentines Park, opened as Central Park in 1898. In 1904, the council also took over the responsibilities of the school board.

In 1926, the Urban District was incorporated as a municipal borough. The borough ran its own tram services until they became the responsibility of the London Passenger Transport Board in 1933.

A move was mooted in 1929 to combine Ilford with Barking and Dagenham (the three districts to contain parts of the Becontree estate), but it was not acted upon.

On five occasions Ilford Corporation unsuccessfully promoted private bills in parliament to attain county borough status and become independent of Essex County Council. The final attempt was in 1954, when the borough had a population of approximately 184,000, larger than neighbouring East Ham and the second largest non-county borough in England.

== Population ==
The population was affected by the building of the Becontree estate from 1921, which was partly in the borough. The Central Line service of the London Underground began in 1947 and the population peaked in 1951.

Year	1891	1901	1911	1921	1931	1951	1961
Population	10,913	41,234	78,188	85,194	131,061	184,706	178,024

== Abolition ==
The borough was considered to form part of the Greater London Conurbation, as defined by the Registrar General. In 1965, under the London Government Act 1963, the Municipal Borough was abolished and its former area transferred to Greater London to be combined with that of the Municipal Borough of Wanstead and Woodford and parts of the Municipal Borough of Dagenham and Chigwell Urban District to form the London Borough of Redbridge.

== Freedom of the Borough ==
The following people and military units have received the Freedom of the Borough of Ilford.

=== Individuals ===
- George, Duke of York: 1929.

=== Military Units ===
- The Essex Regiment: 14 June 1947.
- The 3rd East Anglian Regiment (16th/44th Foot): 9 September 1958.
