= List of landmarks and attractions in Marikina =

There are numerous landmarks and attractions in Marikina.

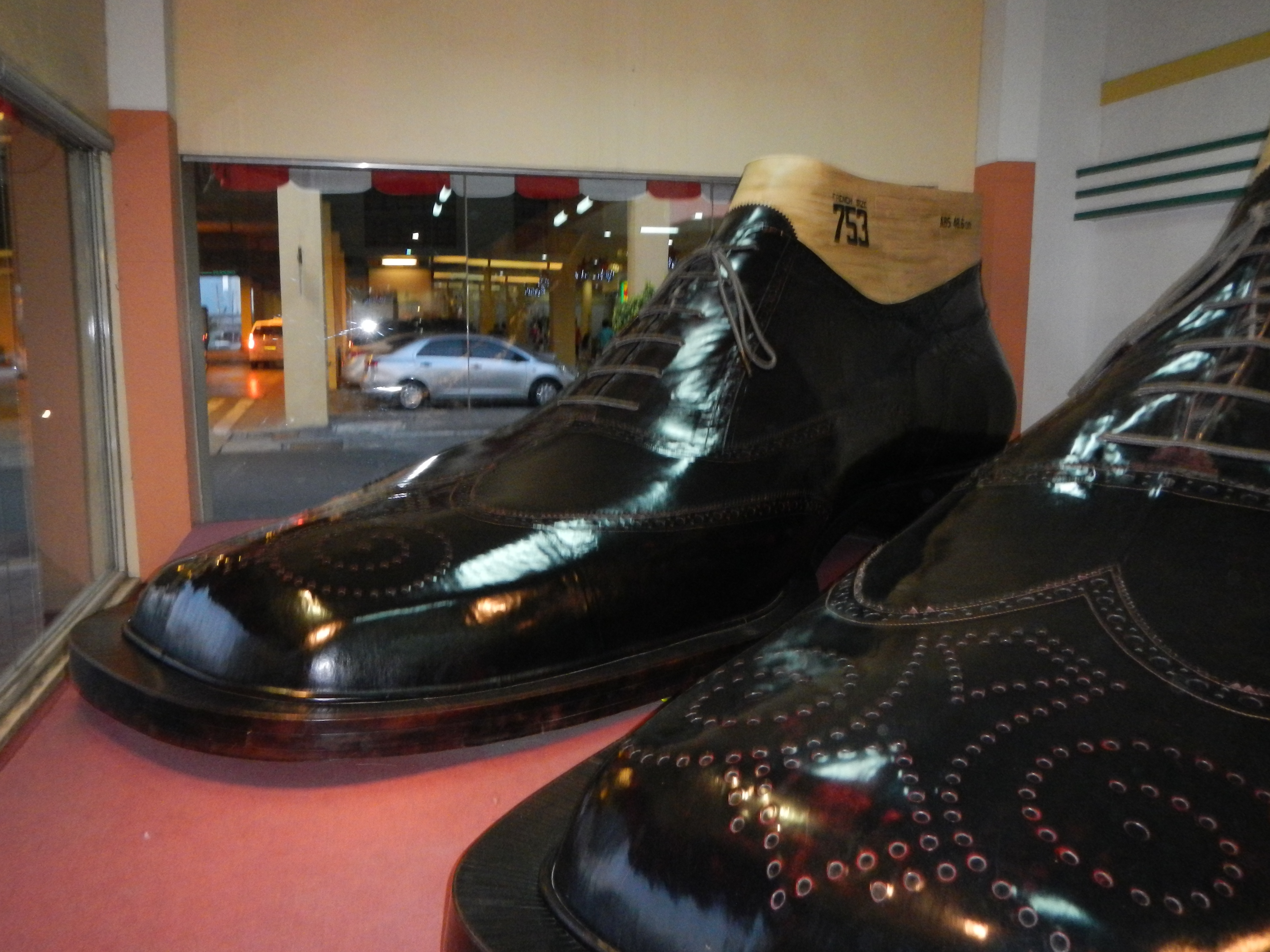
Largest pair of shoes in the world, located at Riverbanks Center

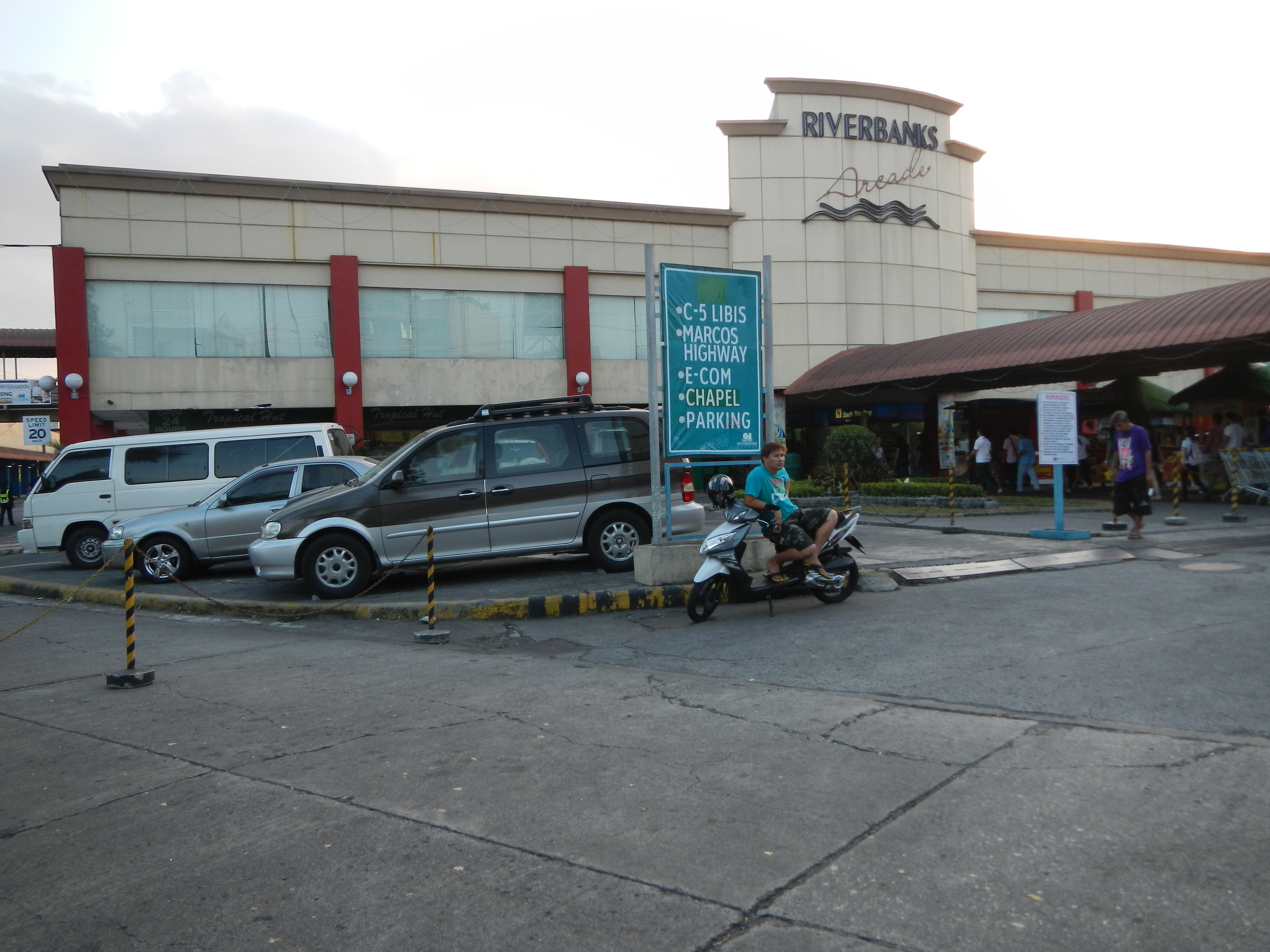
Cityhood Park

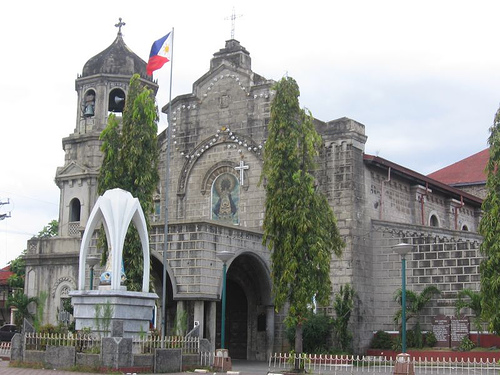
Our Lady of Abandoned Church

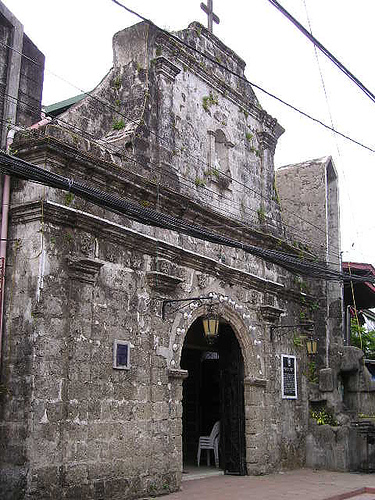
Jesus de la Peña Chapel

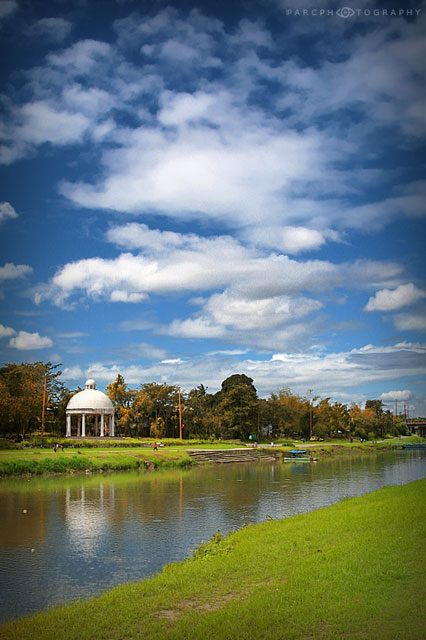
Marikina River Park

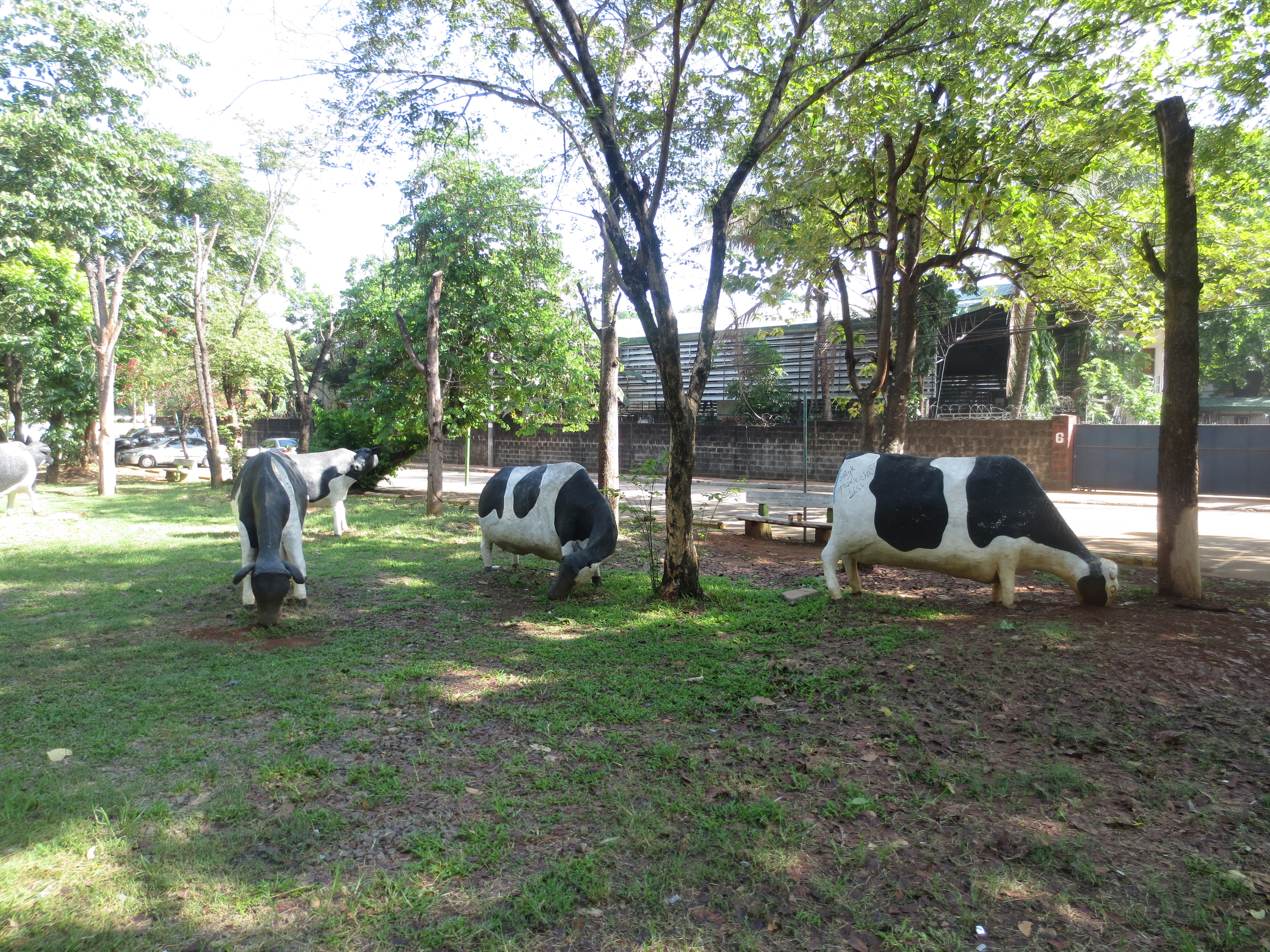
Cows in Evolution Park at Brgy. Marikina Heights.

== Major landmarks ==
- Marikina Cityhood Park – An open public park and signature landmark of Marikina located at the corner Shoe Avenue and Sumulong Highway. Unveiled in 2005, it features a fountain as its centerpiece and framed by a Spanish inspired facade, upon which 12 carillons are set.
- World's Largest Pair of Shoes – This is certified by the Guinness Book of World Records in December 2002 as the largest pair of shoes in the world. It is located and displayed at the Shoe Gallery section of Riverbanks Mall in Riverbanks Center and it is one of the top attractions in the city. The shoes measures 5.29 meters long, 2.37 meters wide and 1.83 meters high. The heel of the shoe was measured 41 centimeters or 16 inches. It is made of genuine leather which took 77 days to finish and the shoes were made in October 2002.
- Riverbanks Center – It is the largest center for shopping, commerce, business, recreation, entertainment and convention venue in Marikina, located along Andres Bonifacio Avenue and nearby Marcos Highway and former location of Universal Textiles, Asia's largest textile mills company. Riverbanks Center's e-Com buildings are listed as approved IT Centers by the Philippine Economic Zone Authority. The World's Largest Pair of Shoes are located inside the Shoe Gallery section of Riverbanks Mall, as well as Philippine Science Centrum and Renaissance Convention Center. SM's very first standalone market chain, SaveMore Market was opened in 1999.
- Marikina Sports Center – Also known as Marikina Sports Park, it is one of the premier sports complex established in the Philippines and touted as "the first of its kind in Asia" in early 1970s. Established in 1969 and then known as the Rodriguez Sports Center, the property was bought from the provincial government of Rizal in 1995. It features an Olympic-size swimming pool, arena, a 15,000-seat grandstands and covered gymnasium. It is now a popular venue for recreation, as well as for national, regional and international sports competitions, and entertainment, concert and other grand events.
- Our Lady of the Abandoned Church – Also known as Nuestra Señora de los Desamparados, this Spanish-era church is located along J. P. Rizal Street. Completed in 1572, and in 1687, it ordered the transfer of Marikina to the care of the Augustinians and became an independent parish in 1690. It is the center of Roman Catholicism in Marikina.
- Shoe Museum – The Shoe Museum is one of famous attractions in Marikina which now holds the shoes of several famous people including a pair of shoes from each president of the Philippines in chronological order. During the 1860s, it used to be a BIGASANG BAYAN (rice mill) owned by the affluent family of Dona Teresa de la Paz of the powerful Tuason clan, one of Marikina’s elite families. It was the only rice mill in town and farmers from nearby areas used to negotiate with the Tuason’s administrator for the storage of their grains. During the Philippine–American War, the place served as a jail for captured Filipino fighters and soldiers. It was not until 2001 that the place was converted into a shoe museum.
- Marikina River Park – Marikina River is one of the most awarded rivers which set as the Hall of Fame awardee for the Cleanest Inland Body of Water in the Philippines. Marikina River Park is a system of expansive tree-lined walkers. It is perfect for a morning jog and has 56-kilometer bike-ways along the riverbanks dedicated to bikers and also park benches and playgrounds for children.
- Sentrong Pangkultura ng Marikina – Known as Kapitan Moy Building, it is the center of culture in Marikina located along J. P. Rizal Street. This 200-year-old building was once owned by Don Jose Guevarra and Don Laureano "Kapitan Moy" Guevarra, the father of shoe industry in the Philippines. The building established in 1780 and this is where the first pair of shoes in Marikina was designed and made in 1887. Andres Bonifacio once visited the place, and American soldiers made it a camp in 1901. The building declared a national shrine in 1968, by the town council and the National Historical Commission. Inside the building can be found Doll Museum, a dioramas showcasing the events and history of Marikina. Kapitan Moy's house now named as Sentrong Pangkultura ng Marikina in 1993.

== Other attractions ==
- Jesus dela Peña Chapel – Established in April 1630 by Jesuits, the first mass in Marikina was held at this chapel which is located in a town of the same name (Barangay Jesus Dela Peña).
- SM City Marikina – SM City Marikina is the first shopping mall that has a wi-fi connection upon its completion. SM City Marikina is a part of SM's 50th Anniversary and it was the first shopping mall to open in 2008.
- Teatro Marikina – This is the center of performing arts of Marikina and eastern Metro Manila. This facility also caters to various events such as plays, concerts, shows, exhibits and seminars. Teatro Marikina is also the venue of annual pre-pageant of Miss Earth in the Philippines, notable concerts and plays played by the biggest celebrities and artists in the Philippines.
- Angel Tuazon Entertainment District – Gil Fernando Avenue, also known as A. Tuazon Avenue, is well-known line-up of having many adventurous bars, live acoustic bands, restaurants, nightclubs and other drinking joints, nearly the entire stretch especially at night.
- Evolution Park – Features the 18 sculptured cows stand as a marker of Marikina's expanse of grazing farmland formerly owned by the illustrious Tuazon Clan. Located in Barangay Marikina Heights.
- Loyola Memorial Park – Sprawling area of 36,000 m² and developed in 1965, the Loyola Memorial Park
- Manila Boystown Complex – A 23-hectare Manila city government-owned institution and facility is exclusively for Manila’s abandoned, forgotten, and voluntarily surrendered children, teenagers, and senior citizens. Located in Barangay Parang.
- Marikina Industrial Park – Located at the northeast portion of the city which was established in the 1970s, it is home to a number of industries and some of which are the biggest and are the leaders in their fields, some of these are Purefoods-Hormel, Nestlé, Fortune Tobacco, Armscor and other leading industries and big companies.
- Marcos Highway – Was named after former Philippine president-turned-dictator Ferdinand Marcos, a newly rehabilitated 10-lane national highway and the main road between Metro Manila and Rizal Province, also known as Marikina-Infanta Highway. Marcos Highway passing the boundaries of Antipolo, Cainta, Pasig and Marikina. There are 3 main intersections in Marcos Highway such as Amang Rodriguez Avenue (Pasig), Imelda Avenue (Marikina-Cainta) and Masinag (Antipolo), and an interchange located in SM City Marikina which provide access exclusively between Marikina to major business districts such as Ortigas Center, Eastwood City and Makati. Some of its landmarks are Riverbanks Center, SM City Marikina, Line 2 Santolan and Marikina-Pasig stations, Ayala Malls Feliz, Sta. Lucia Mall, Robinsons Metro East, AMA Computer College, SM City Masinag, Masinag Market and Cogeo Market. Also, Marcos Highway is well known for numerous establishments like car shops, major schools, restaurants and food chains, exclusive villages, industrial parks, and among others.
- Marikina Market Mall – Metro Manila's cleanest and well-maintained market is Marikina Public Market, known as Marikina Market Mall. It is also one of the biggest market place in Metro Manila in terms of area.
- Our Lady of Perpetual Succor College – OLOPSC is a private, non-sectarian, tertiary learning institution located in Concepcion Uno, Marikina. It was founded by Dionisio Salvador, Sr. in 1978. As of 2009, there are already 5000+ estimated students enrolled. OLOPSC is considered as a landmark due to its structural design.
- Philippine Science Centrum – This is the Philippines largest and well-maintained science centrum and it is one of the most visited amenities inside Riverbanks Center especially the field trips of students came from different schools in Metro Manila.
- Women's Park – Located beside Marikina River Park. It is a park dedicated to females of Marikina.
- Diocesan Shrine and Parish of Saint Paul of the Cross – Established in 1975. On March 28, 2021, the church was elevated to the status of Diocesan Shrine. On May 12, 2024 the venerated image of Our Lady of Fatima was pontifically crowned under the authority of Pope Francis.
- Lilac Street – Lilac Street is a major thoroughfare located in Concepcion Dos, features a line of restaurants and eateries along the street, which are popular among a variety of customers, including the middle class.
