= Jesús de la Peña Chapel =

Roman Catholic chapel in Marikina, Philippines

San Isidro Labrador Church
- Jesús de la Peña Chapel
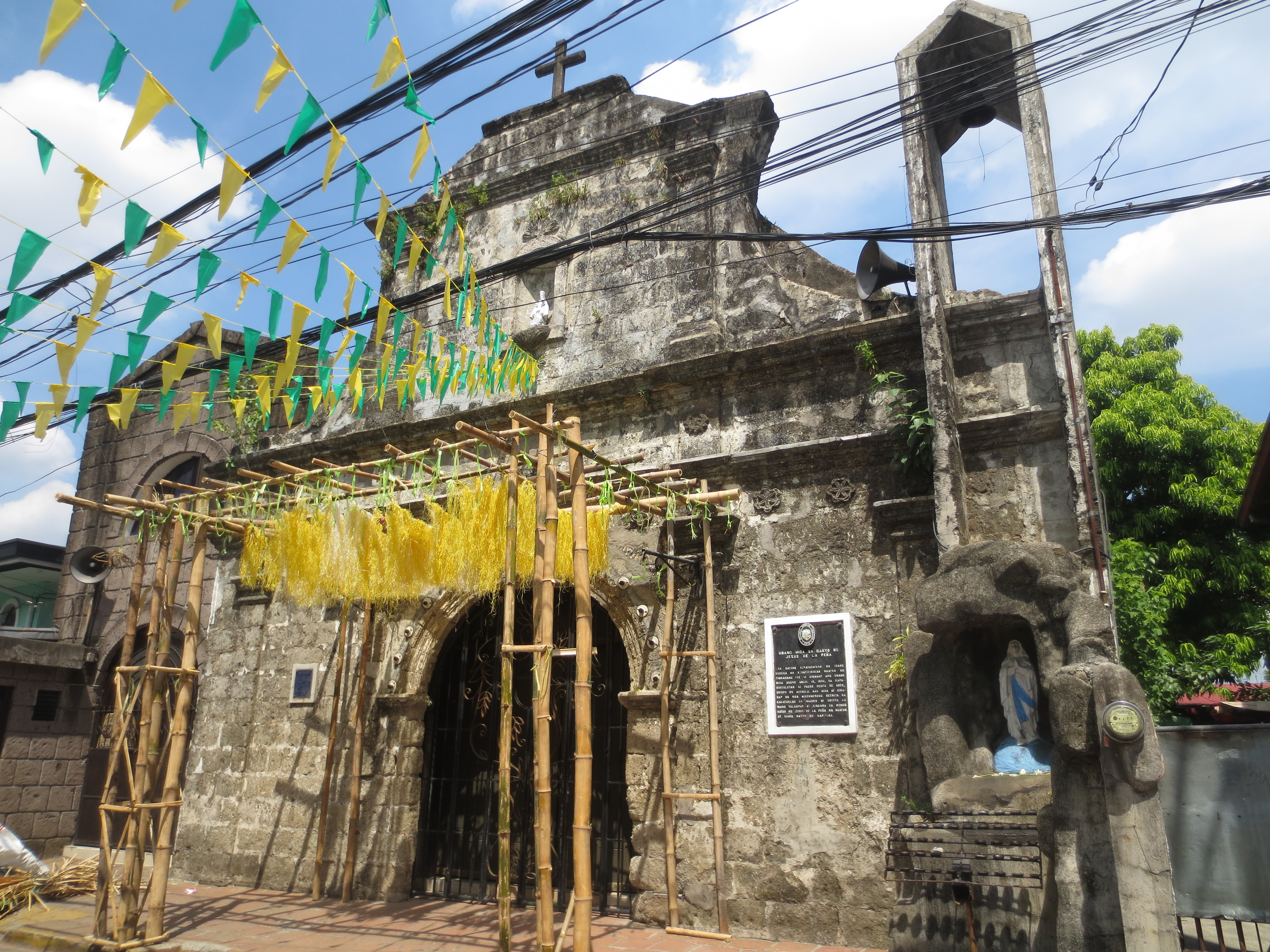
- Church facade in 2014

- Location in Metro Manila Location in Luzon Location in the Philippines
- 14°38′03″N 121°05′31″E
- Location: Marikina, Metro Manila
- Country: Philippines
- Denomination: Roman Catholic
- Churchmanship: Roman Rite

History
- Status: Chapel
- Consecrated: 1630

Architecture
- Functional status: Active
- Architectural type: Church building
- Style: Romanesque
- Groundbreaking: 1st church (1630)

Administration
- Archdiocese: Manila
- Diocese: Antipolo

Jesús de la Peña Chapel or San Isidro Labrador Church is a historic visita in Marikina, Philippines where the first catholic mass in Marikina was held. Built by the Society of Jesus in the year 1630 with the permission of the reigning Archbishop of Manila, its establishment marked the beginning of the recorded history of Marikina, which was once a vast and mountainous area traversed by the Marikina River.

== History ==
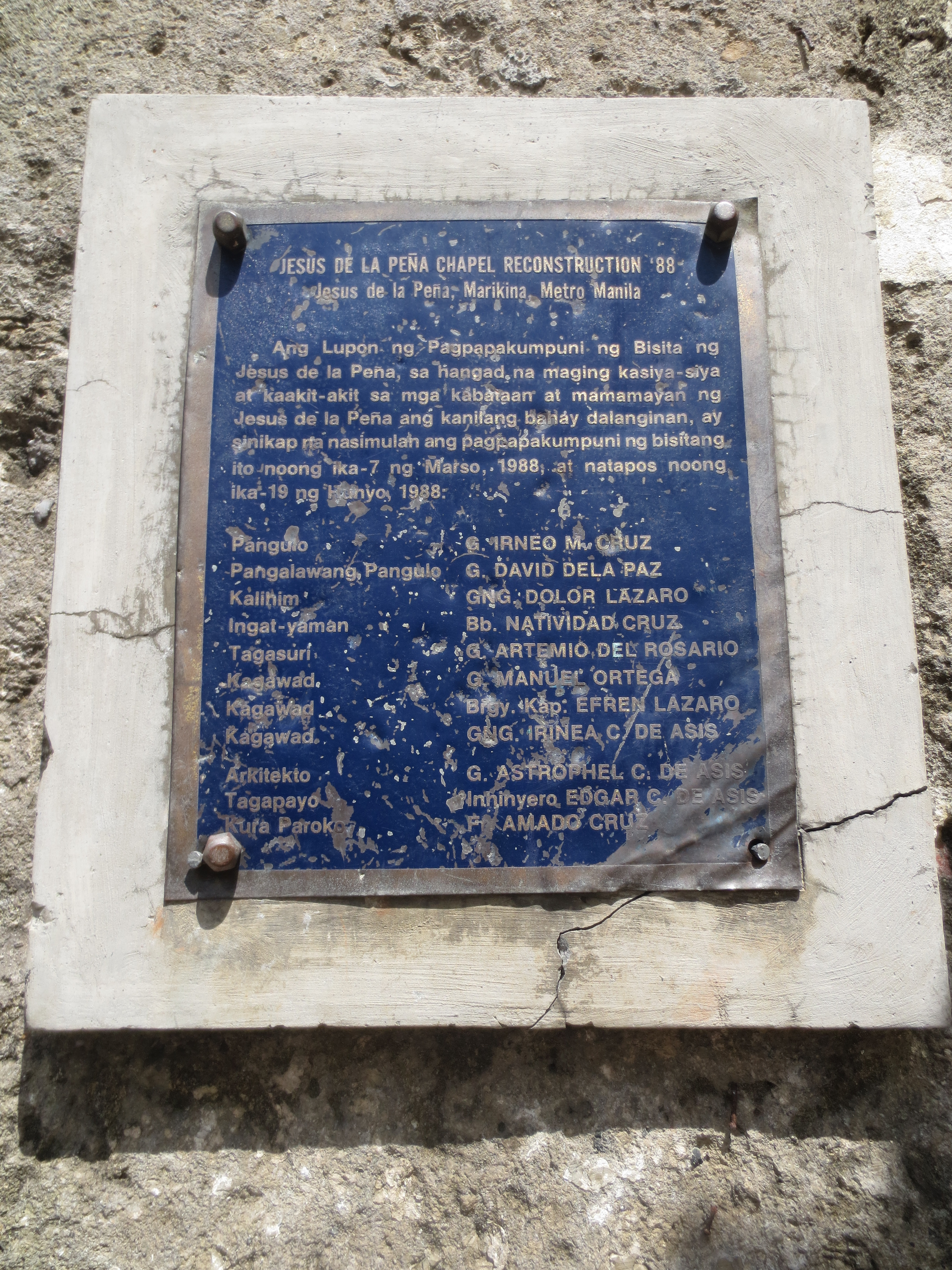
A historical marker detailing the renovation of the Chapel

The construction of Jesús de la Peña Chapel marks the beginning of Christianity in Marikina. Before the Spaniards arrived, the area was settled by river-dwellers who relied on the Marikina River for their means of livelihood. When the Jesuits first came to the idyllic, fertile land now known as Jesús dela Peña, they brought with them a small image of Jesus. Fired with zeal to convert the natives to Catholicism, they held the first Mass in a former storage house on April 16, 1630. Afterwards, they immediately formed their order at the west bank of the river, which was full of big rocks. Inspired by the site, the priests soon called the place as "Jesús de la Peña" (Jesus of the Rock) which was also the name of the new mission.

Later, the Augustinians' control over Marikina spread from Santa Elena to Jesús de la Peña. When the Jesuits ceded the chapel to Augustinians, Governor Gabriel Cruz Elasque instructed the transfer of the order to Sta. Elena because the visita was prone to frequent flooding from the Marikina River.

On March 7, 1988, the Chapel underwent renovations, which lasted until June 19, 1988.

== Architecture ==
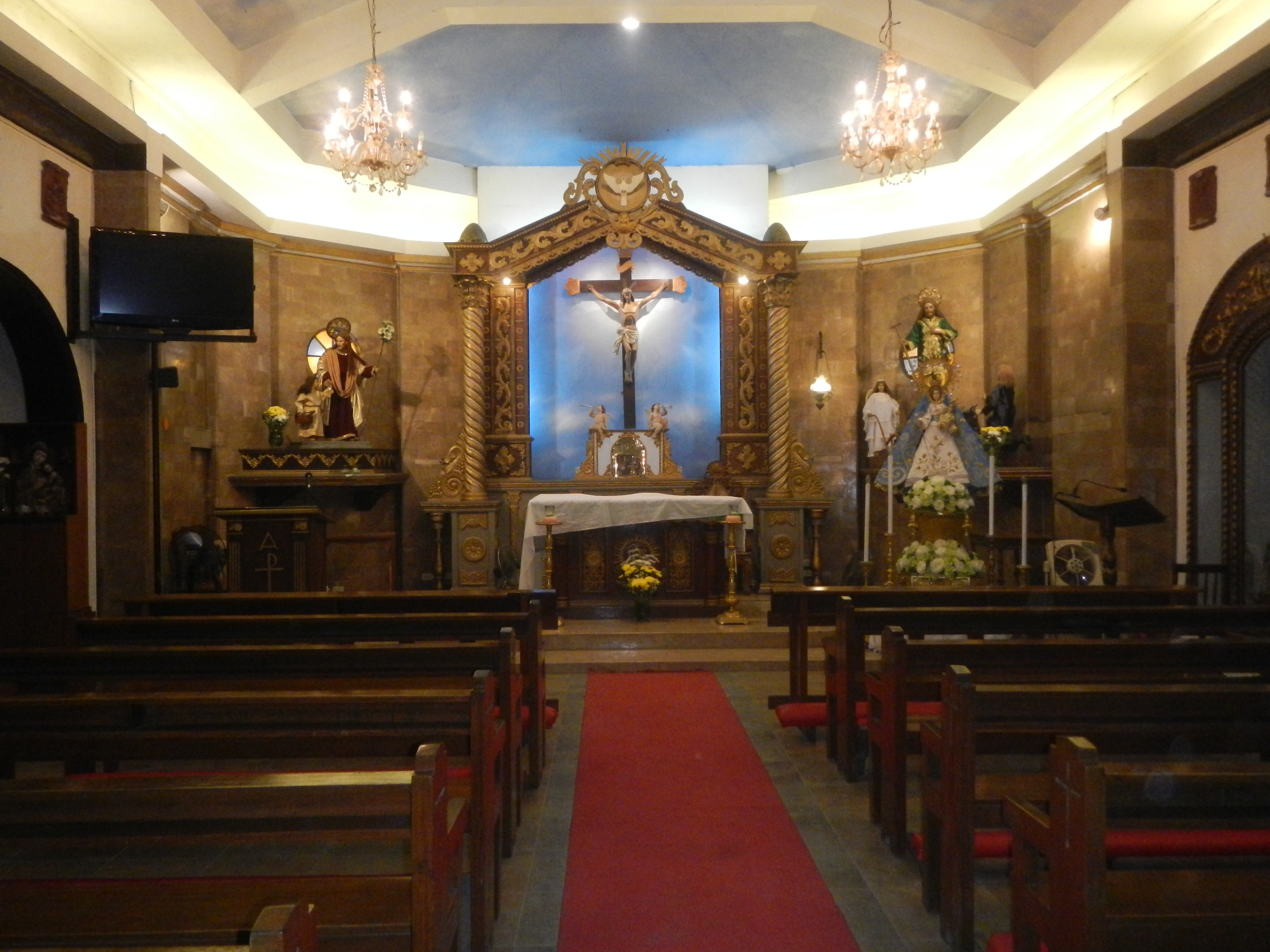
Chapel interior in 2017

The chapel is designed in Neo-Romanesque style as indicated by the arched openings and light facade. In the chapel's early designs, a row of monolithic columns is used for support and decoration as it was a common feature for Roman and early Christian architecture. A quaint bell tower is attached at the left side of the church which signifies its pragmatic, simple design of having been built beside the river which has a high tendency to overflow during the wet season.

== Historical marker ==
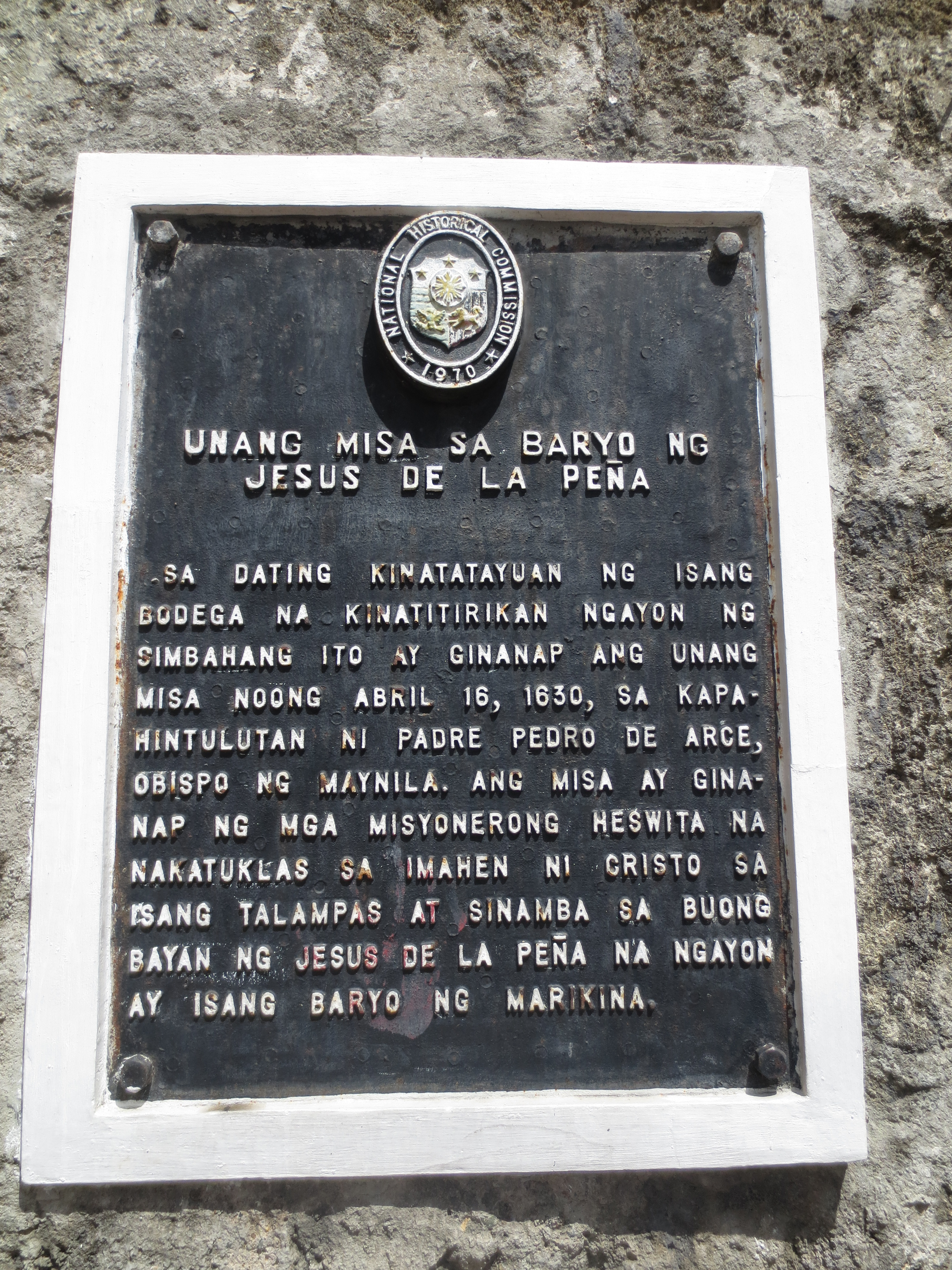
The marker placed by the National Historical Commission commemorating the chapel's historical significance

The Philippine National Historical Commission acknowledges the Chapel's historical relevance with a marker with the following inscription (translated from the original Filipino):

On the former site of a storehouse where now this Chapel stands, is where the first Mass was held on April 16, 1630, under the auspices of Father Pedro de Arce, Bishop of Manila. The Mass was conducted by Jesuit missionaries who discovered on the plateau an image of Christ, which was venerated by the whole town of Jesus dela Peña, which is now a barrio of Marikina.

== Gallery ==
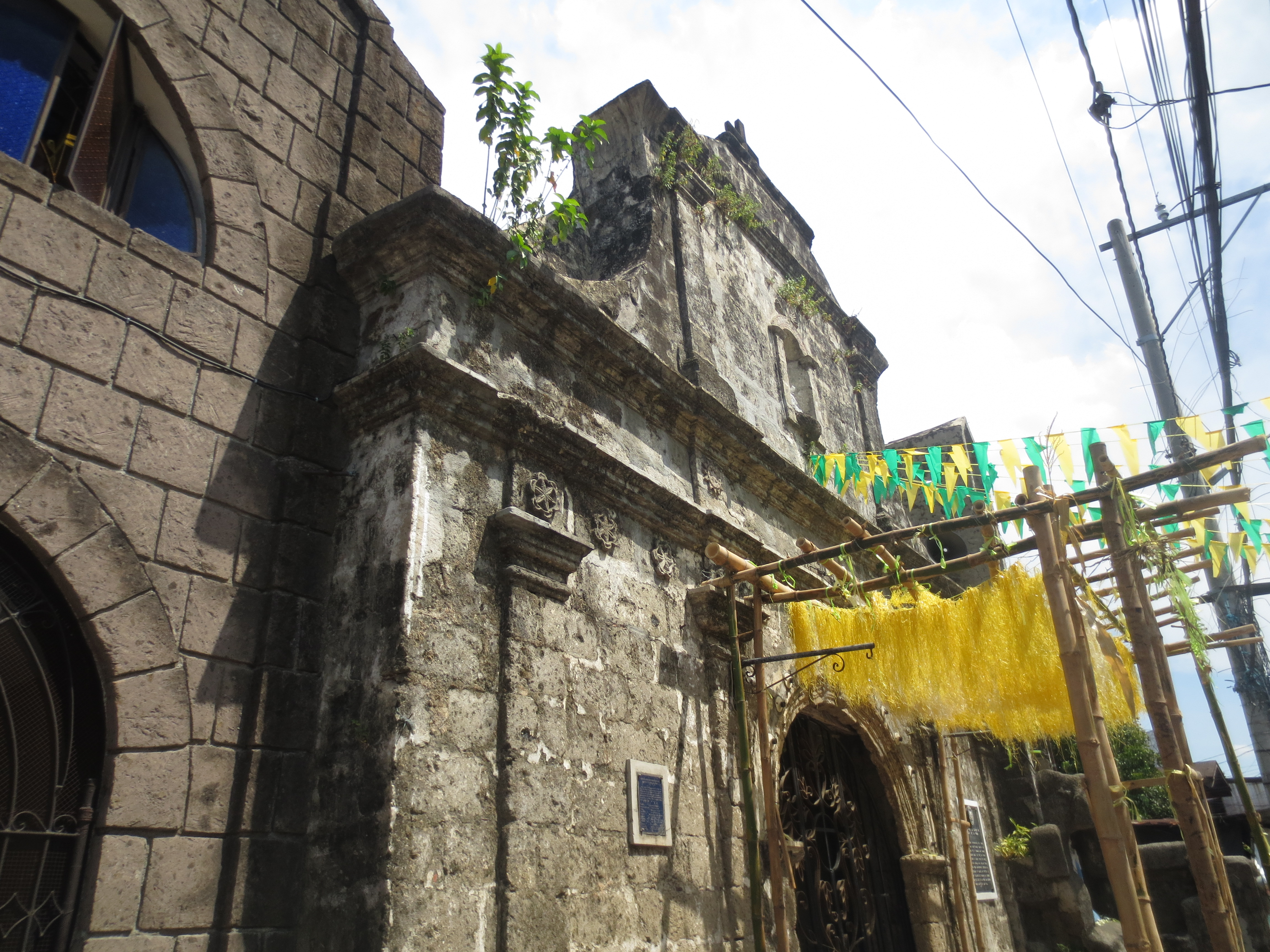
The Chapel's façade from another angle

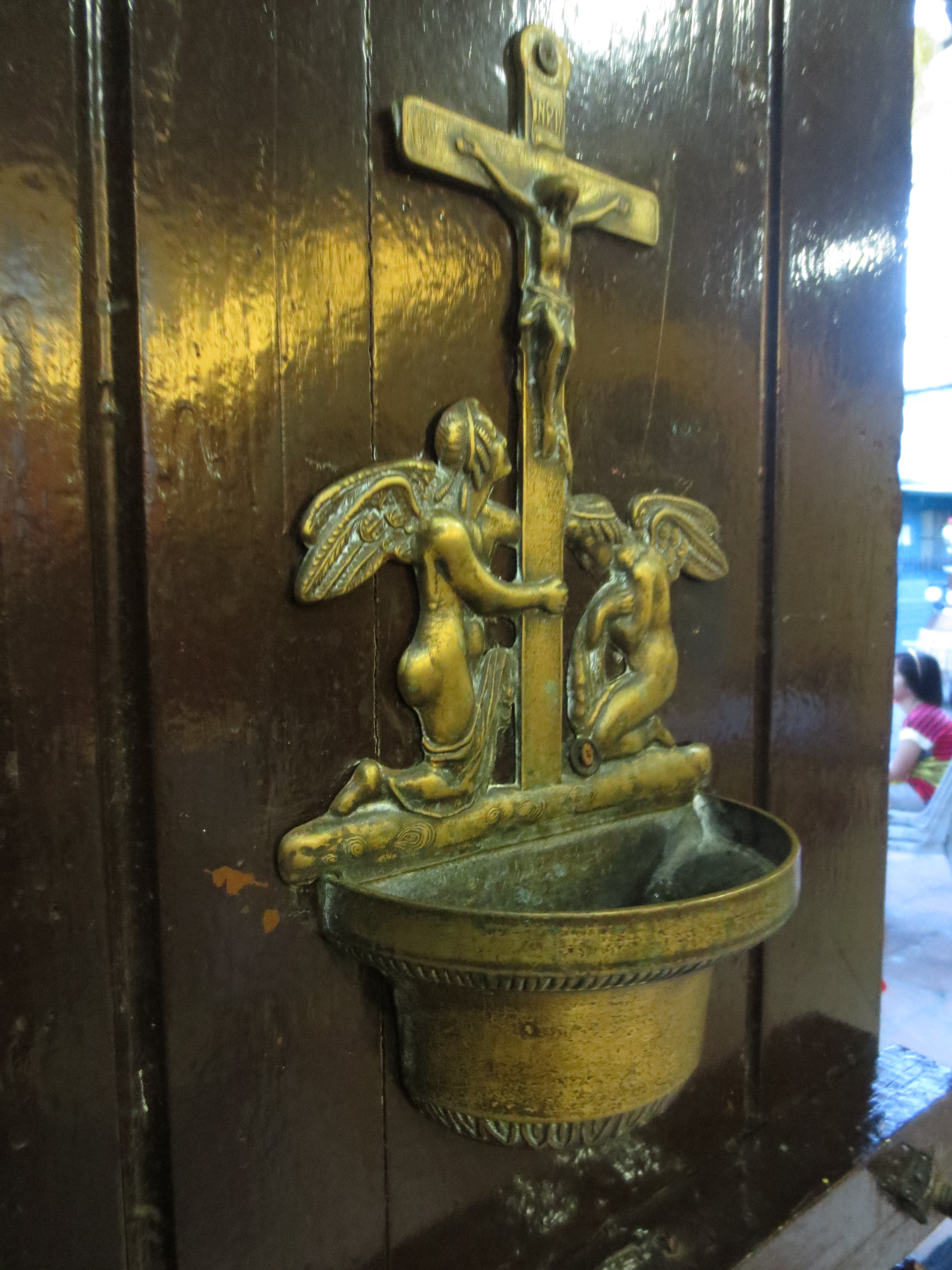
A brass stoup for holy water

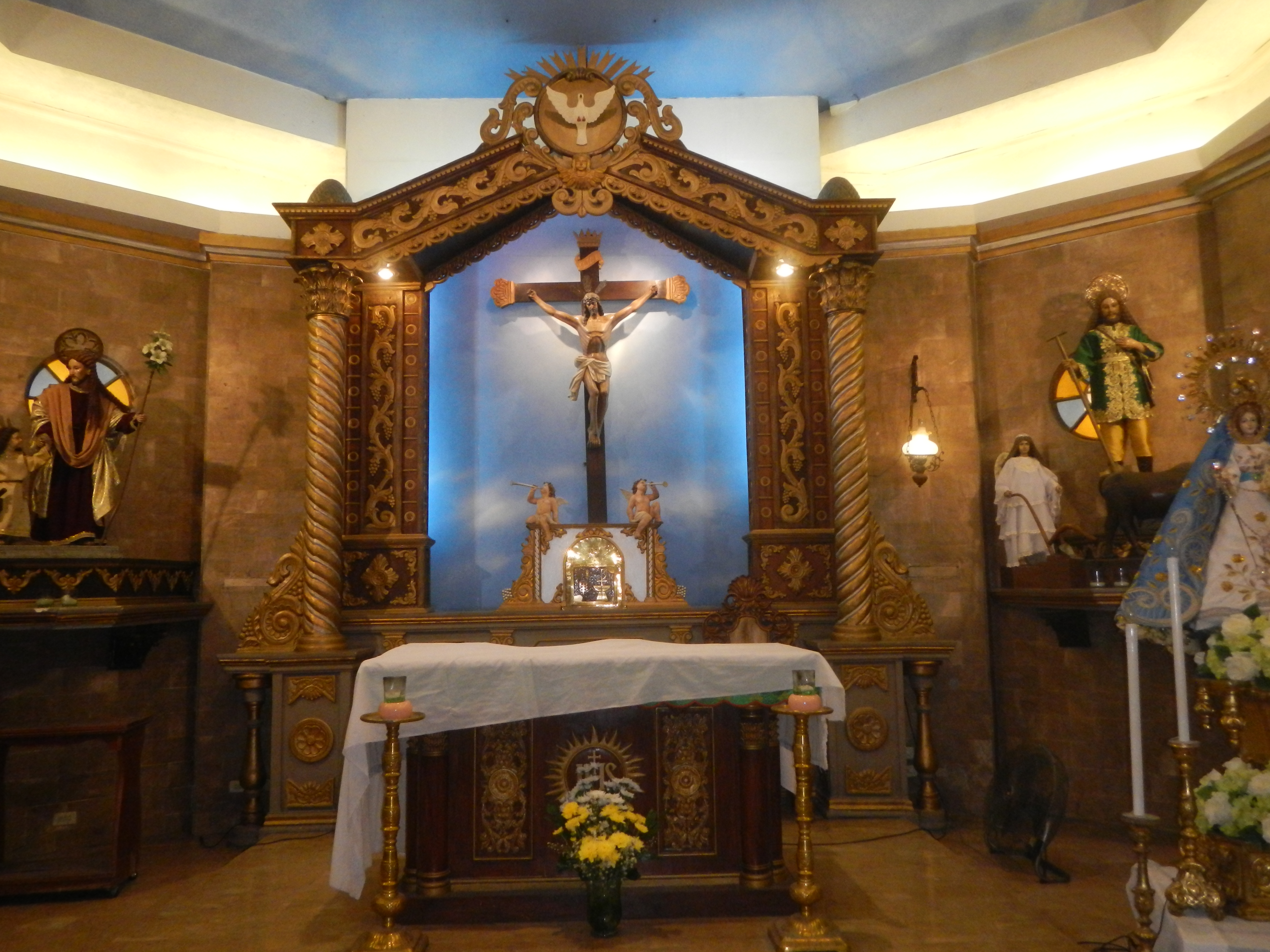
The Chapel altar and retable

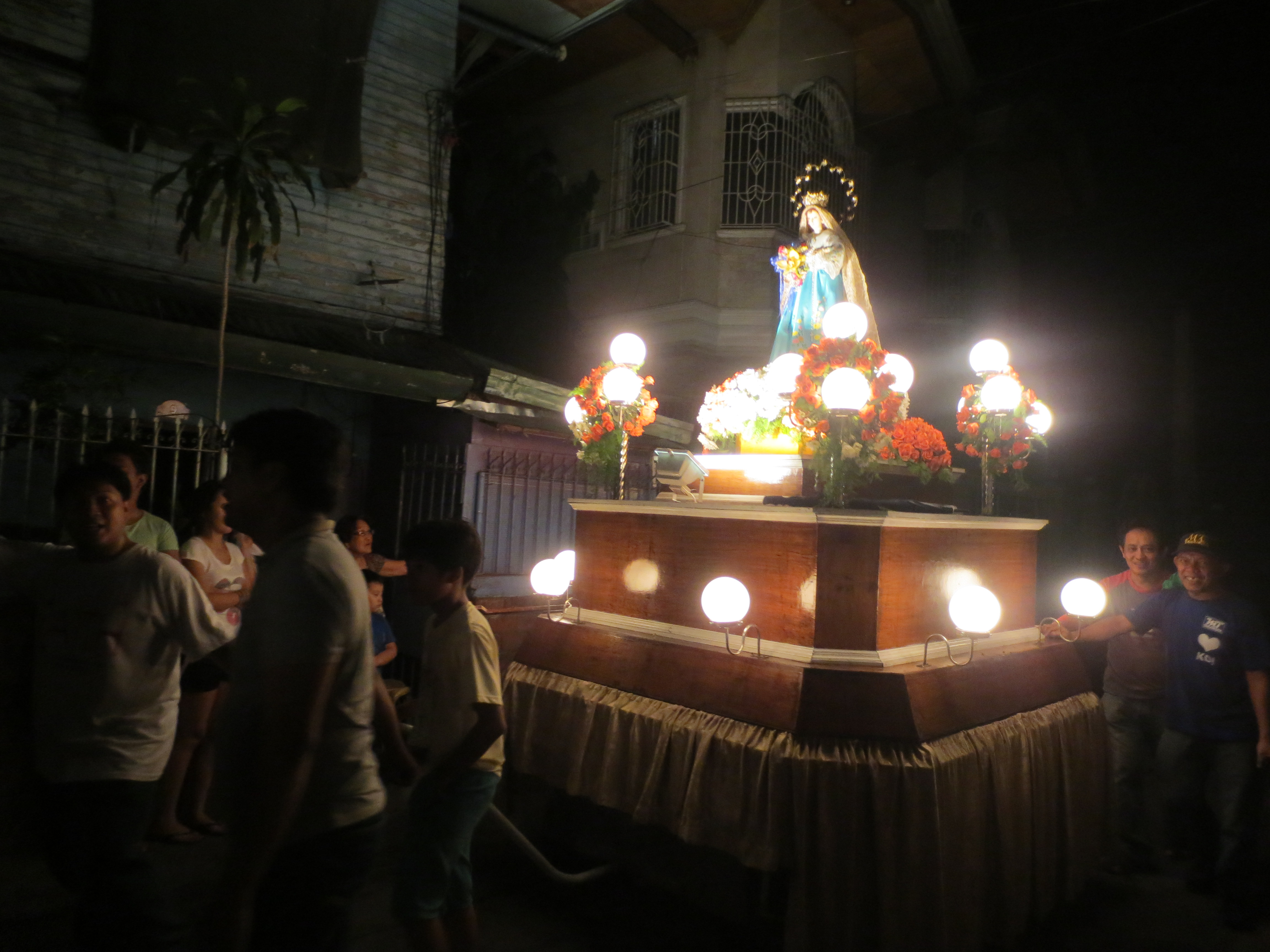
The Chapel's statue of Saint Mary used in procession during the annual Santacruzan

== See also ==
- List of landmarks and attractions of Marikina
- Diocesan Shrine and Parish of Nuestra Señora de los Desamparados
- Santa Elena, Marikina
