= Boot =

Type of footwear extending above the ankle joint

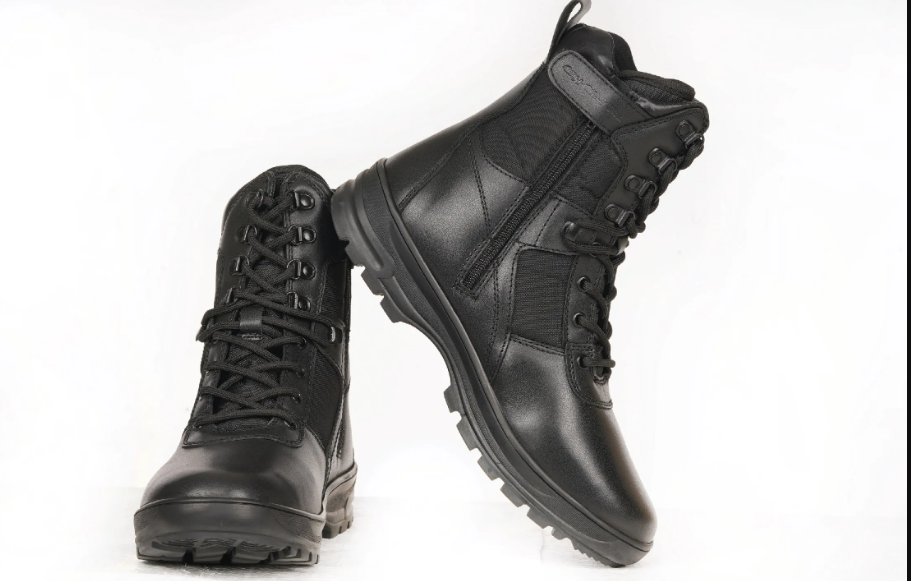
A pair of "combat" boots

A boot is a type of footwear. Most boots mainly cover the foot and the ankle, while some also cover some part of the lower calf. Some boots extend up the leg, sometimes as far as the knee or even the hip. Most boots have a heel that is clearly distinguishable from the rest of the sole, even if the two are made of one piece. Traditionally made of leather or rubber, modern boots are made from a variety of materials.

Boots are worn both for their functionality and for reasons of style and fashion. Functional concerns include: protection of the foot and leg from water, mud, pestilence (infectious disease, insect bites and stings, snake bites), extreme temperatures, sharp or blunt hazards (e.g. work boots may provide steel toes), physical abrasion, corrosive agents, or damaging radiation; ankle support and traction for strenuous activities such as hiking; and durability in harsh conditions (e.g. the underside of combat boots may be reinforced with hobnails).

In some cases, the wearing of boots may be required by laws or regulations, such as the regulations in some jurisdictions requiring workers on construction sites to wear steel-toed safety boots. Some uniforms include boots as the regulated footwear. Boots are recommended as well for motorcycle riders. High-top athletic shoes are generally not considered boots, even though they do cover the ankle, primarily due to the absence of a distinct heel.

== History ==
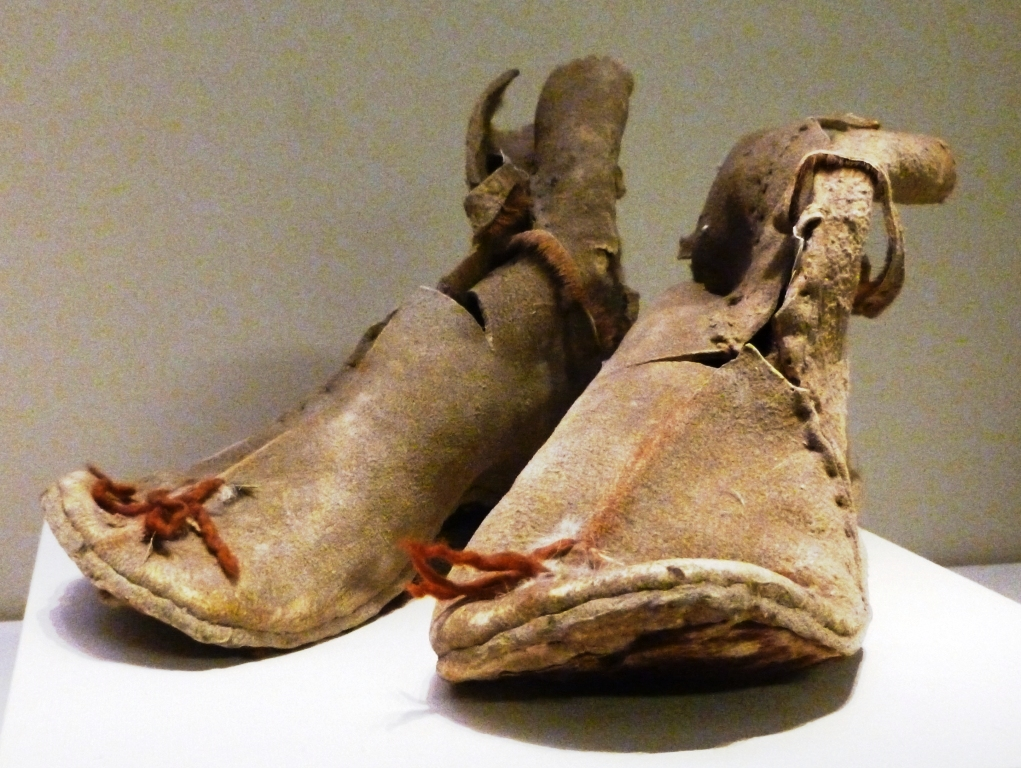
Oxhide boots from Loulan, Xinjiang, China. Former Han dynasty 220 BC – AD 8

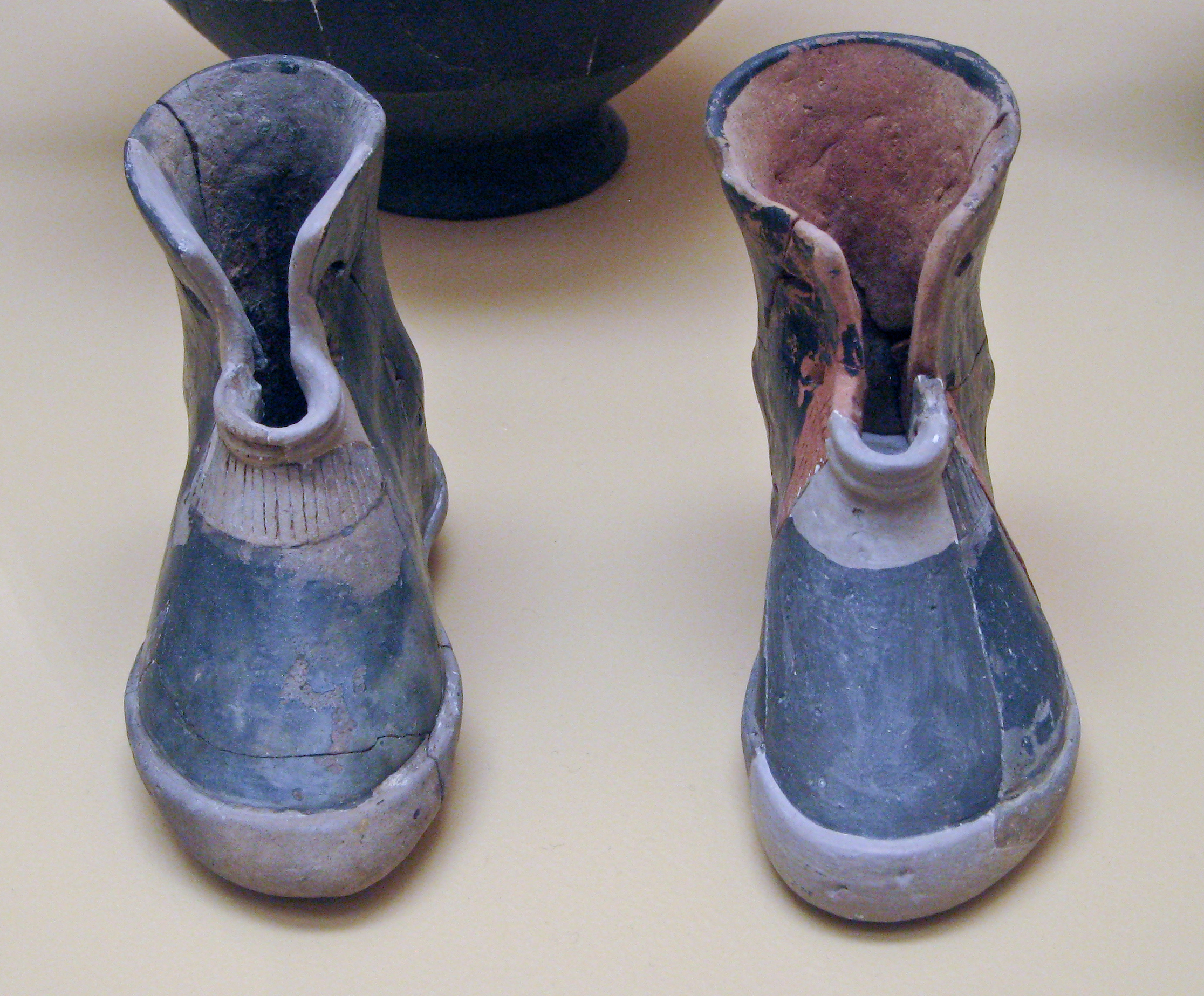
Ancient Greek pair of terracotta boots. Early geometric period cremation burial of a woman, 900 BC, Ancient Agora Museum, Athens.

Early boots consisted of separate leggings, soles, and uppers worn together to provide greater ankle protection than shoes or sandals. Around 1000 BC, these components were more permanently joined to form a single unit that covered the feet and lower leg, often up to the knee. Ancient Persian workers wore leather boots (evident from their natural mummification) with complex construction techniques supporting work on uneven and cold environments. A type of soft leather ankle boots were worn by nomads in eastern Asia and carried to China to India and Russia around AD 1200 to 1500 by Mongol invaders. The Inuit and Aleut natives of Alaska developed traditional winter boots of caribou skin or sealskin featuring decorative touches of seal intestine, dog hair and suchlike. 17th century European boots were influenced by military styles, featuring thick soles and turnover tops that were originally designed to protect horse mounted soldiers. In the 1700s, distinctive, thigh-high boots worn by Hessian soldiers fighting in the American Revolutionary War influenced the development of the iconic heeled cowboy boots worn by cattlemen in the American west.

== Purpose ==
=== Practical uses ===
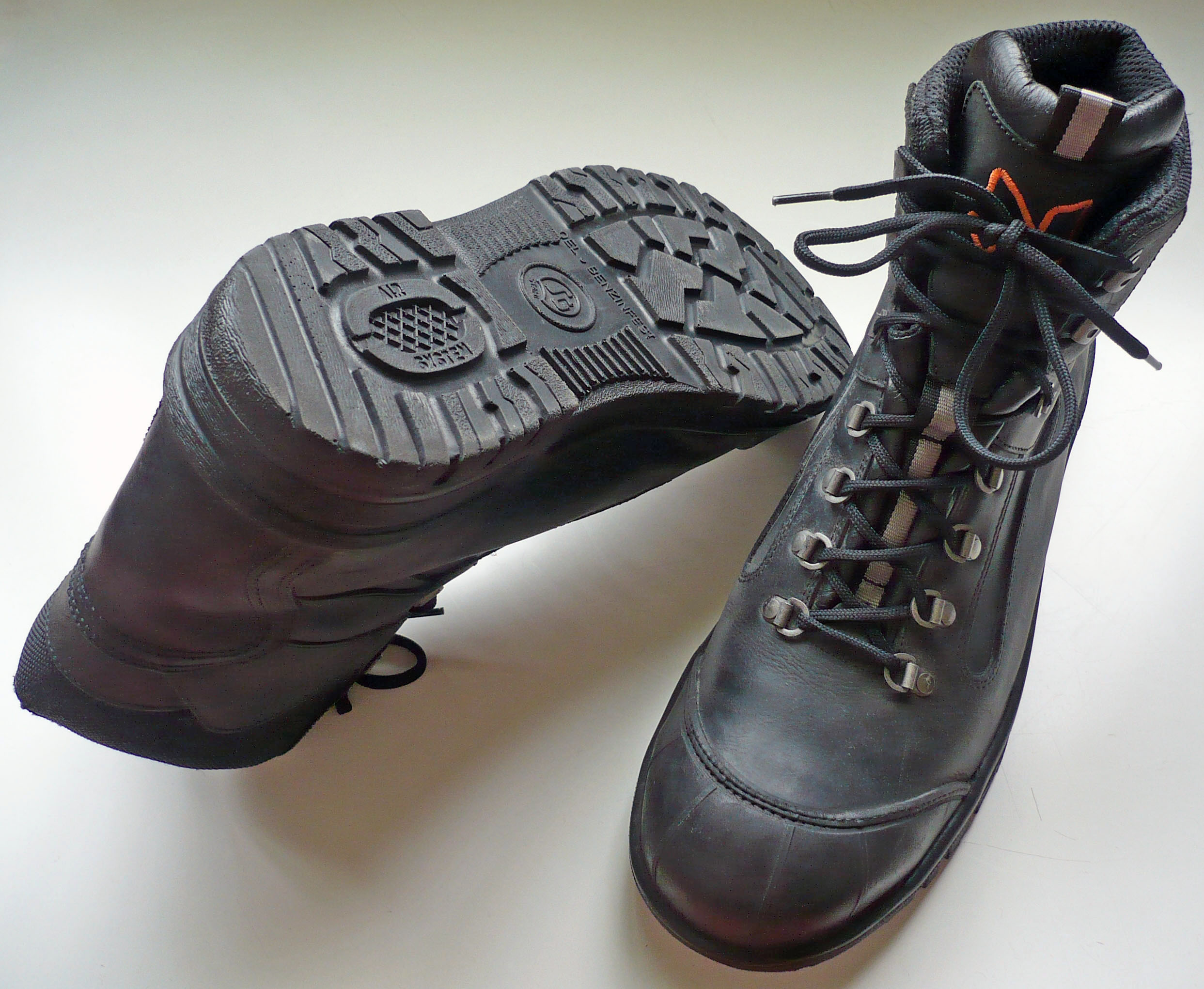
A pair of ISO 20345:2004 compliant S3 steel-toed safety boots designed for construction workers

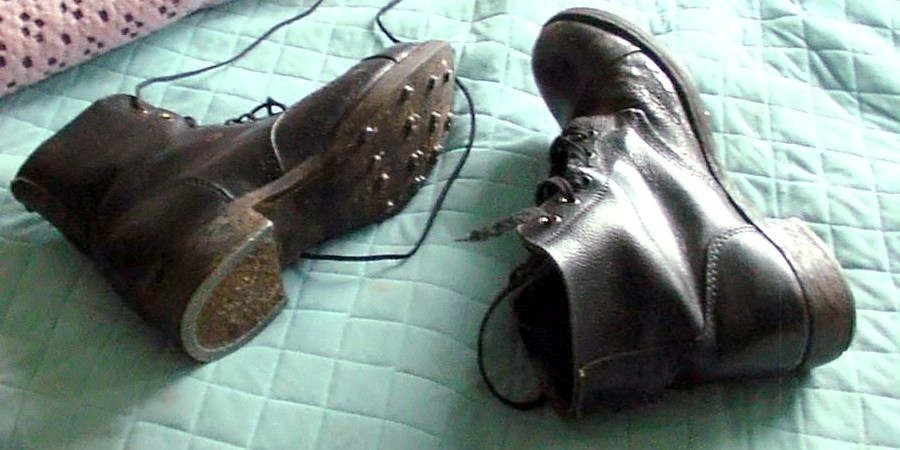
A pair of hobnailed boots

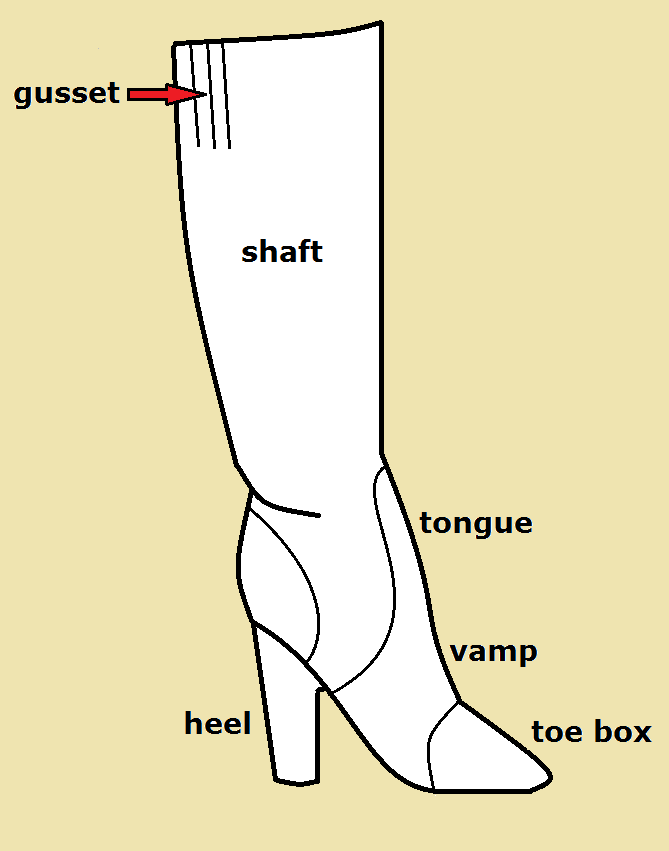
Fashion boot terminology

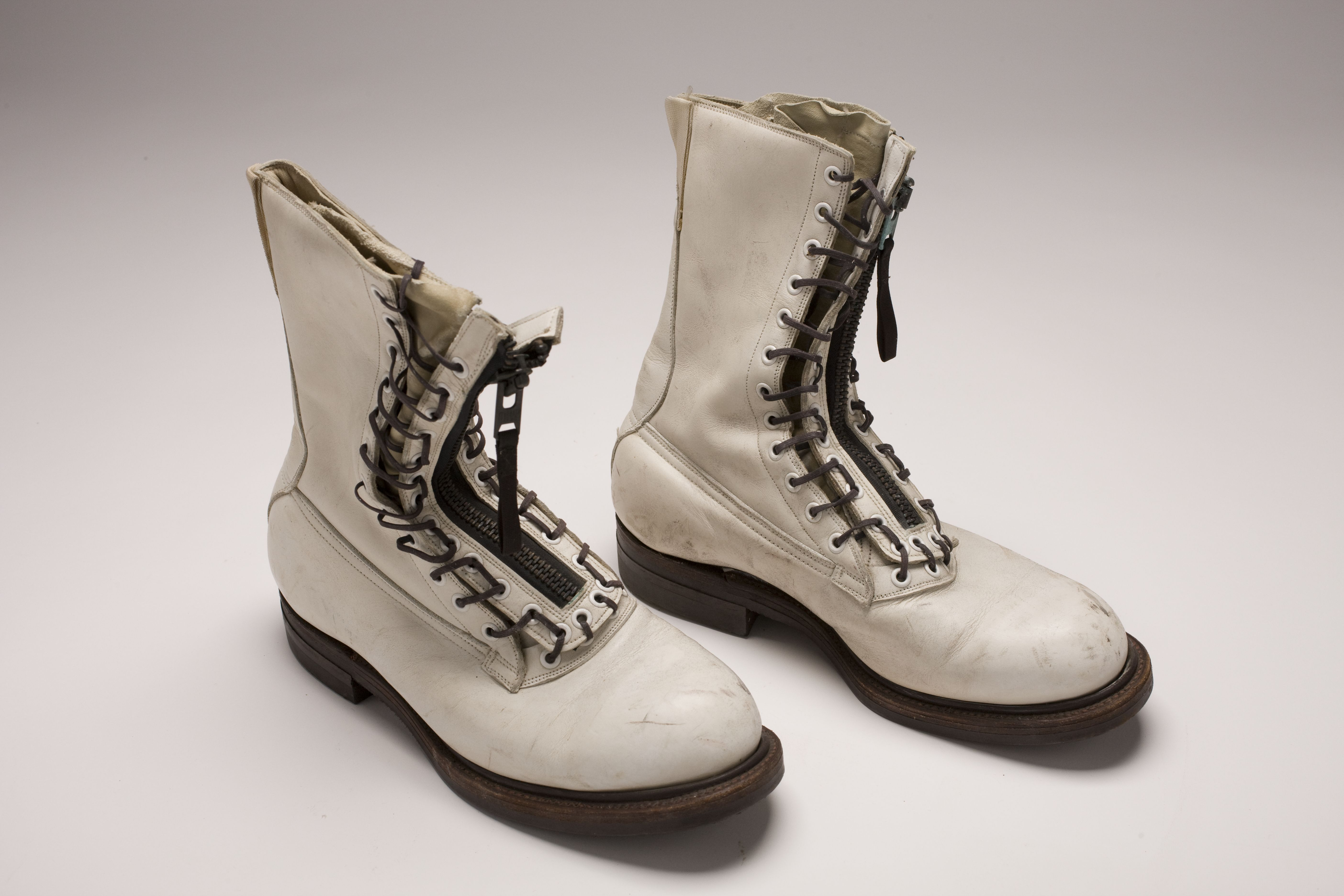
A pair of A-12 OXCART flight suit boots

Boots which are designed for walking through snow, shallow water and mud may be made of a single closely stitched design (using leather, rubber, canvas, or similar material) to prevent the entry of water, snow, mud or dirt through gaps between the laces and tongue found in other types of shoes. Waterproof gumboots are made in different lengths of uppers. In extreme cases, thigh-boots called waders, worn by anglers, extend to the hip. Such boots may also be insulated for warmth. With the exception of gum boots, boots sold in general retail stores may be considered "water resistant", as they are not usually fully waterproof, compared to advanced material boots, such as Gore-Tex, used regularly by fishers or hikers.

Speciality boots have been made to protect steelworkers' feet and calves if they accidentally step in puddles of molten metal, to protect workers from a variety of chemical exposure, to protect workers from construction site hazards and to protect feet from extreme cold (e.g., with insulated or inflatable boots for use in Antarctica). Most work boots are "lace ups" made from leather. Formerly they were usually shod with hobnails and heel- and toe-plates, but now can usually be seen with a thick rubber sole, and often with steel toecaps. While gumboots are often used in workplaces, such as underground mines, studies have shown that workers prefer "lace up" boots mainly due to their support and better fit.

Boots are mostly worn with socks to prevent chafes and blisters, to absorb sweat, to improve the foot's grip inside the boot, or to insulate the foot from the cold. Before socks became widely available, footwraps were worn instead.

Specialty boots have been designed for many different types of sports, particularly riding, skiing, snowboarding, ice-skating, and sporting in wet/damp conditions.

=== Fashion and fetish use ===
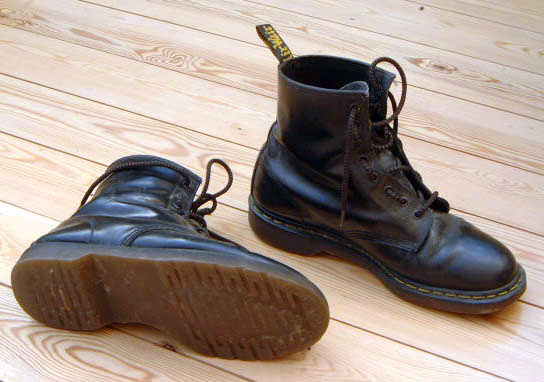
A pair of "classic" black leather Doc Martens. While these boots were originally designed as workwear (they are resistant to petrol, alkaline chemicals and other substances), they were adopted as a fashion item by the skinhead and punk subcultures.

Bovver boots, Doc Martens boots and army boots were adopted by skinheads and punks as part of their typical dress and have migrated to more mainstream fashion, including women's wear. As a more rugged alternative to dress shoes, dress boots may be worn (though these can be more formal than shoes). Fashionable boots for women may exhibit all the variations seen in other fashion footwear: tapered or spike heels, platform soles, pointed toes, zipper closures and the like. The popularity of boots as fashion footwear ebbs and flows. Singer Nancy Sinatra popularized the fad of women wearing boots in the late 1960s with her song "These Boots Are Made for Walkin'". They were popular in the 1960s and 1970s (particularly knee-high boots), but diminished in popularity towards the end of the 20th century. In the 2010s, they experienced a resurgence in popularity, especially designs with a long bootleg. Boot bolos, boot bracelets, boot straps, boot chains, and boot harnesses are used to decorate boots. Sandal boots also exist.

Boots have become the object of sexual attraction for some people and they have become a standard accessory in the BDSM scene (where leather, latex and PVC boots are favoured) and a fashion accessory in music videos. Knee- or thigh-high leather boots are worn by some strippers and pornography models and actresses. Boots have even become a sexual fetish for devotees known as boot fetishists and foot fetishists.

== Types ==
=== Cowboy boots ===
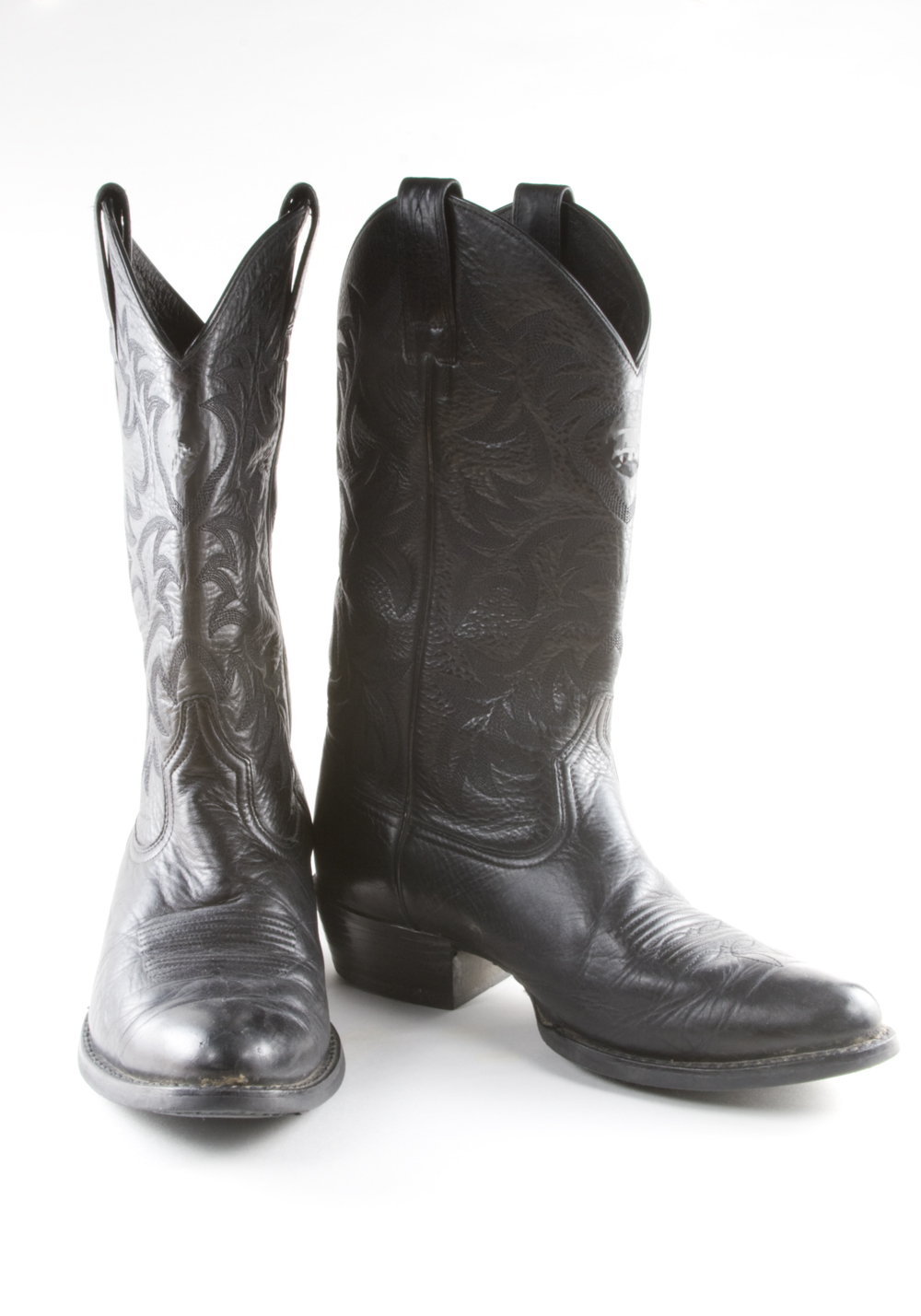
Black cowboy boots

Cowboy boots originated in the 1800s in the plains and desert of the midwest and far Western United States, however they were inspired by the vaquero-style boot bought from Spain to the Americas in the 1600s. Cowboy boots are traditionally tall and hide the calf, which is meant to help keep the foot firmly in the stirrup to keep it firmly anchored. Furthermore, they have angled heels, which help to anchor the foot into the stirrup to prevent it from slipping. The stitching on the leather exterior of the boots also serve a utilitarian purpose, to prevent the shaft of the boot from folding over.

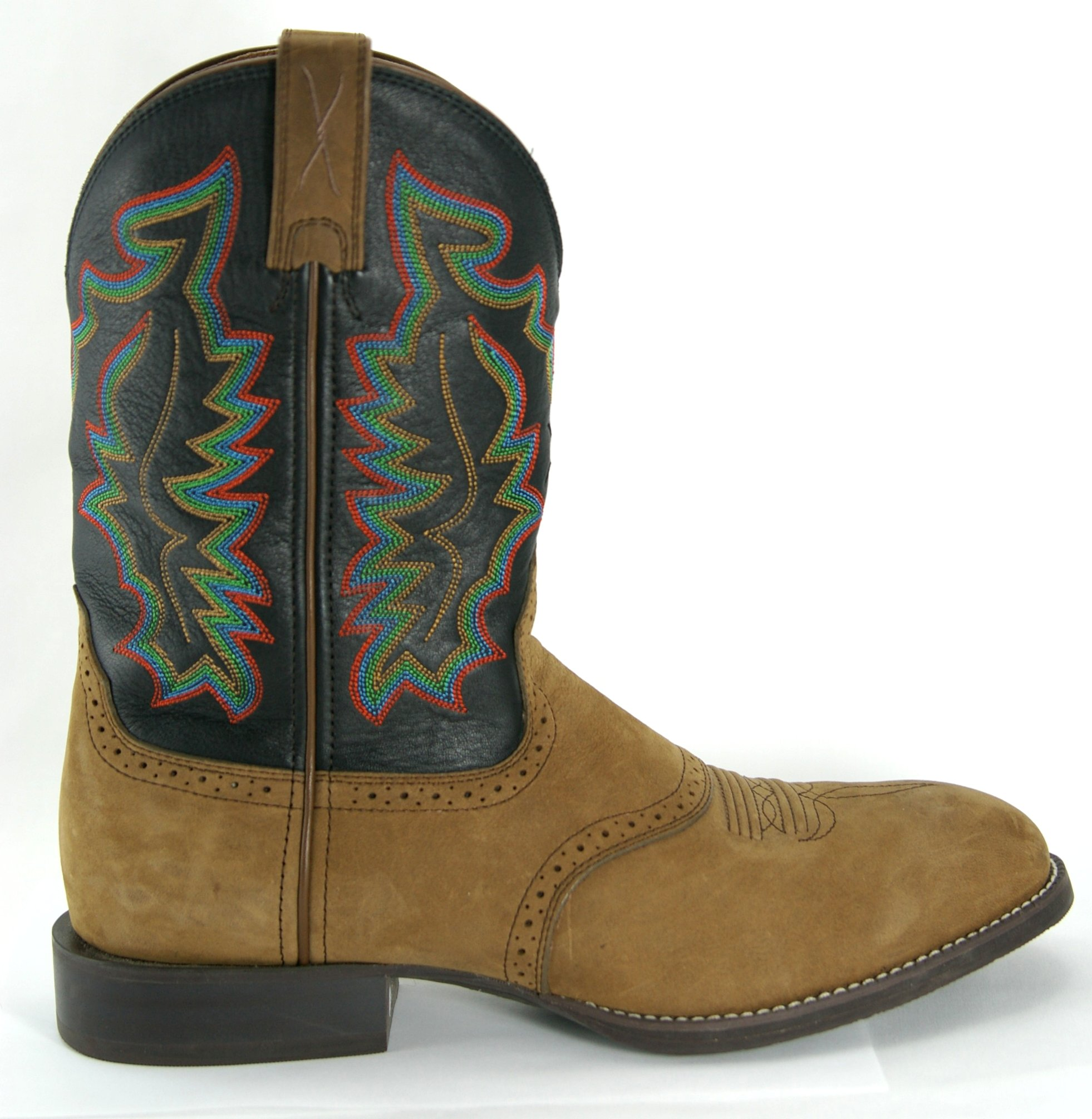
A Roper Boot

The boots become popular in post-Civil War America, when the country saw a switch from military boots to cowboy boots. Hollywood also saw a further rise in popularity of the boots due to the increase of mid-Western cowboy films on the big screen. Cowboy boots have also gained popularity as practical work footwear, combining functionality with a distinctive sense of style.

In the summer of 2022, cowboy boots were seen making a comeback into mainstream fashion, with, as of 8 August 2022, there being over 379.7 million views on the hashtag #CowboyBoots on TikTok. Cowboy boots were seen on many in the fields of festivals such as Coachella, and being worn by many mainstream celebrities such as Dua Lipa, Emily Ratajkowski and Bella Hadid. Variations of the classic cowboy boot were also being sold in many high-street stores such as Mango, ASOS and Urban Outfitters, and were seen on the runways for high fashion brands such as Miu Miu and Bottega.

== Boot parts and accessories ==
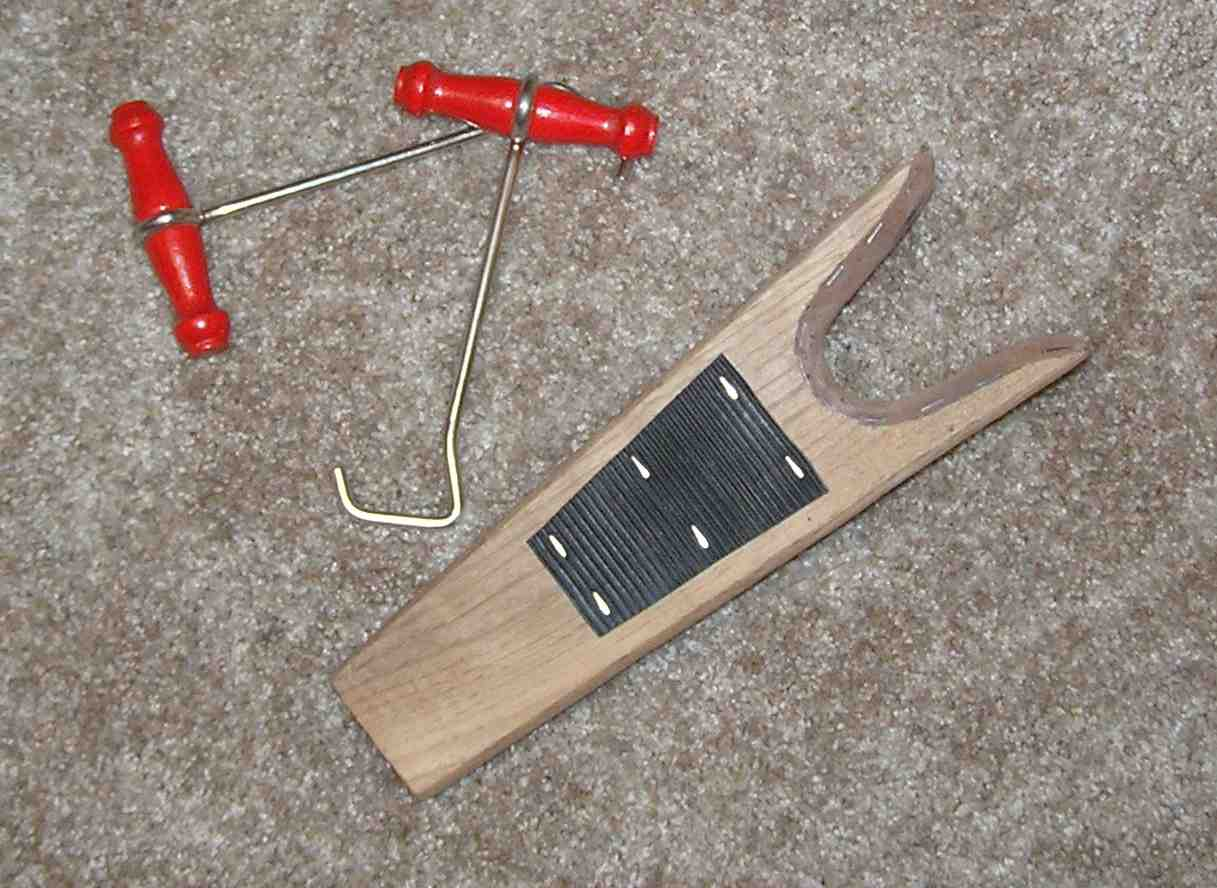
Boot hooks (left) and a boot jack (right) are sometimes needed to put on or take off some types of boots

- Spats
- Boot jack
- For the parts of a boot, see Hiking boot#Parts

== As symbols ==
=== In heraldry ===
Coat of arms of Aresches municipality in France displays a boot in the heraldic left field

Boots have been used by riders for millennia, and were used by knights. As a consequence, albeit not common, boots came to be used as charges in heraldry.

Because of the origin of heraldry as insignia used by mounted warriors like the medieval knights, when boots are used in heraldry, they are often displayed as riding boots, even if the blazon might not specify it as such. They are sometimes adorned with spurs, which may or may not have another tincture (colour) than the boot and the background field.

Boots were also used in coats of arms of shoemakers' guilds and in shop signs outside their shops.

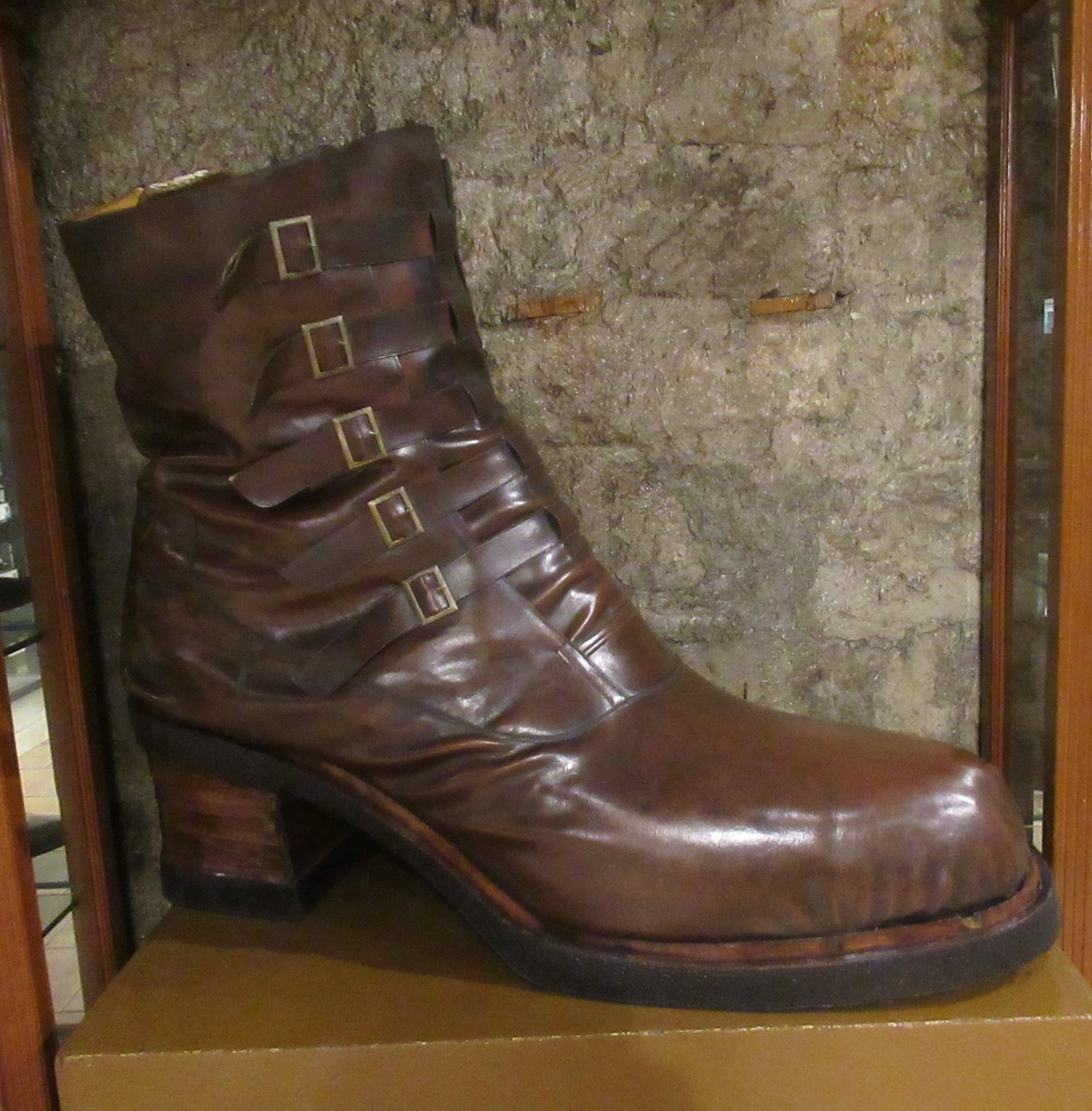
Giant boot at Marikina Shoe Museum replacing the damaged Giant shoes of Marikina

=== Idioms and cultural references ===
- Boots that are particularly old and well worn, or a similarly tough item are referred to as being tough and strong with the phrase "tough as old boots."
- A discarded boot may be used in the construction of a musical instrument known as the "mendoza."
- Tall (high) boots may have a tab, loop or handle at the top known as a bootstrap, allowing one to use fingers or a tool to provide better leverage in getting the boots on. The figurative use "to pull one's self up by one's bootstraps" in the sense of "ability to perform a difficult task without external help" developed in the 19th century in US English. The term "bootstrapping" was subsequently used in a metaphorical sense in a number of fields, notably computing (which uses the term "bootup" to describe the process of starting a computer) and in entrepreneurship, which uses the term "bootstrapping" to describe start-up companies which are launched without major external financing.
- To "die with one's boots on" means to die while one is still actively involved in work or to go down fighting. Popularized by Wild West movies.
- Boot camp: a colloquial term for the initial recruit training of a new recruit enlisting in a military organization or armed force. In this context, a "boot" is just such a recruit.
- Stormtroopers and other agents of authority or units used for political strongarm tactics such as intimidation are typically referred to by their detractors as "jackbooted thugs," a reference to the hobnailed military jackboot of the World War I German Stormtrooper and later Nazi uniform. Authoritarian rule, either by hostile military forces, or by groups of armed intimidators, is imposed by "jackboot tactics."
- To "give one the boot" means to kick one out (of a job, a club, etc.) or expel one, either literally or figuratively.
- To "put the boot in" is an idiom for inflicting violence on someone.
- "The boot is on the other foot now" means that a situation has become reversed—a previous victor is now losing, for example.
- Wearing "seven-league boots" references a classic children's fairy tale and indicates that a person or company can cover great distances, figuratively or literally, in a single stride.
- To "shake/quake in one's boots" means to be very frightened, and is mostly used sarcastically.
- "Knocking boots" is slang for having sex, regardless of whether either person is wearing boots.
- The country of Italy is referred to as "lo Stivale" ("The Boot") due to its shape.

== See also ==
- List of boots
- List of shoe styles
- Boot cut
- Boot fetishism
- Boots theory
- Gumboot dance
- Wellie wanging
