= Giant shoes of Marikina =

City attraction

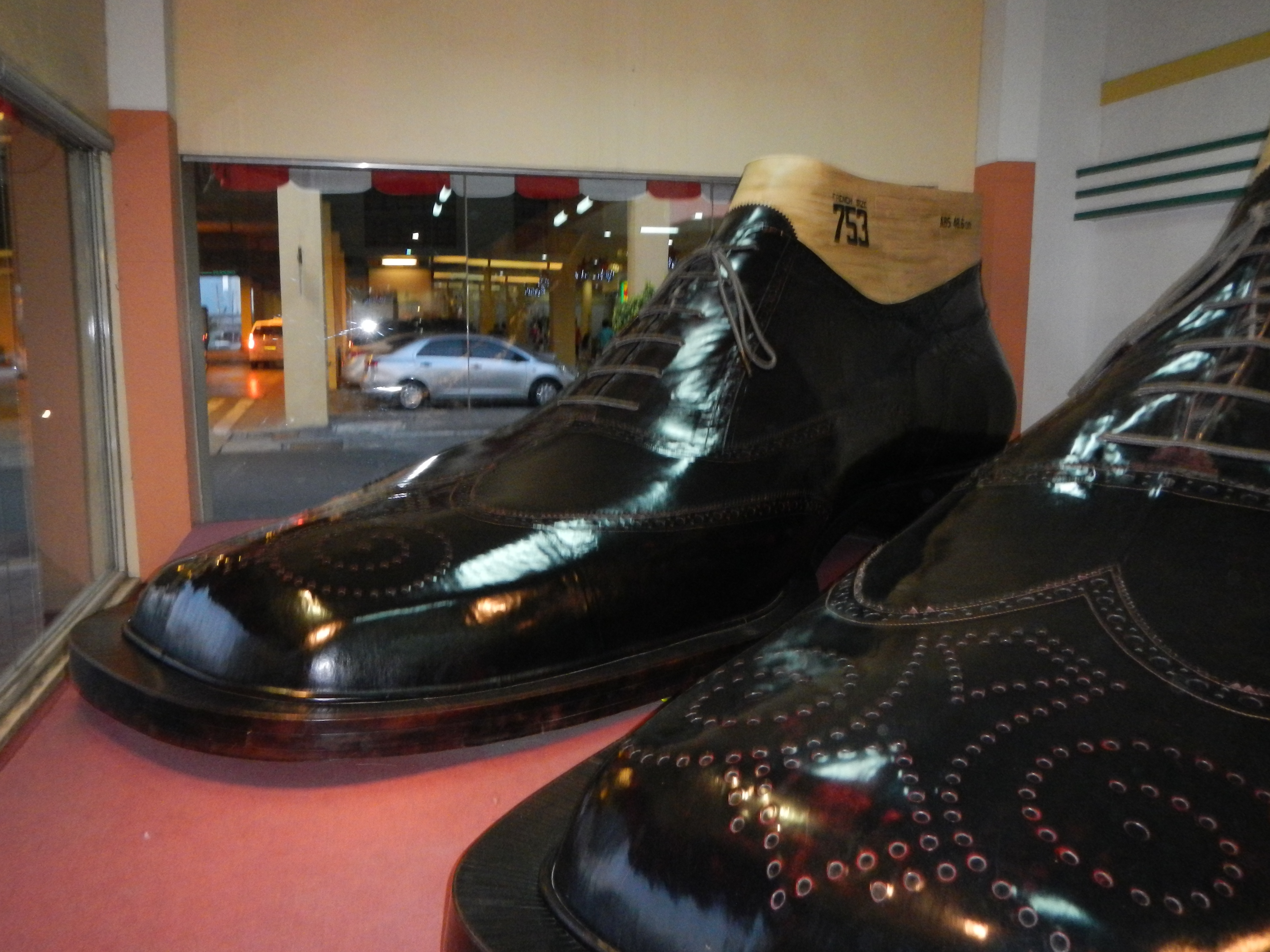
- Designer: Colossal Footwear
- Year: 2002
- Type: Men's shoes (size 753; French shoe size standard)
- Material: Leather
- On display at: Marikina City Hall (current); Marikina Sports Park (formerly); Marikina Shoe Gallery (formerly)

A pair of giant shoes made in Marikina, Philippines, were a city attraction and were known for being the world's largest shoes according to Guinness World Records. The city, nicknamed "Shoe Capital of the Philippines", is known for its shoe-making industry.

== Conception ==
The Marikina city government, known for its shoe-making industry, under Mayor Marides Fernando is responsible for the creation of two giant shoes. The crafting of the shoes were part of a bid to break the Guinness World Records on the "largest shoes in the world" as well as an attempt to boost the city's reputation in shoe-making globally.

== Crafting and dimensions ==
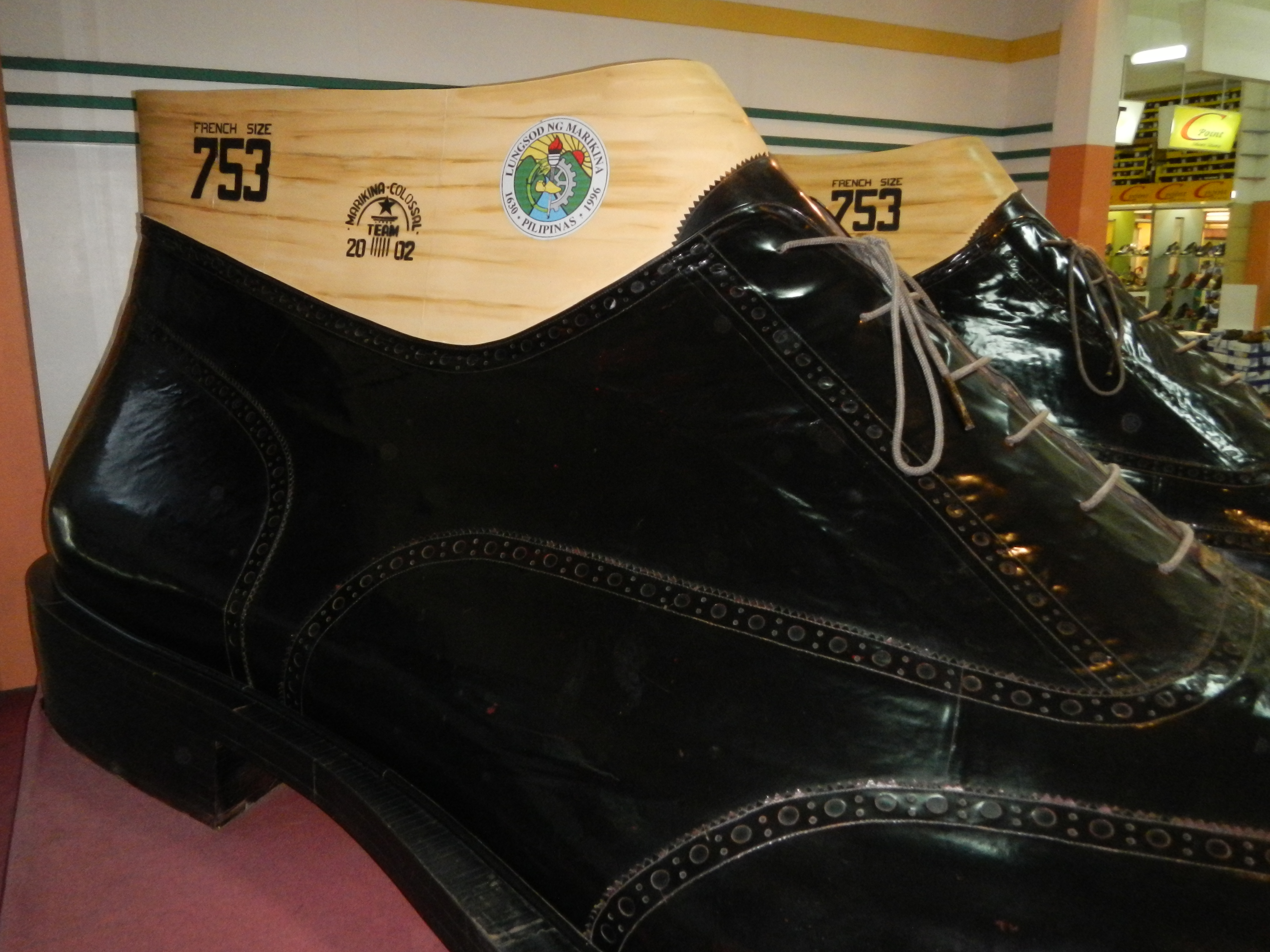
The giant shoes on display at the Marikina Shoe Gallery at the Riverbank Mall.

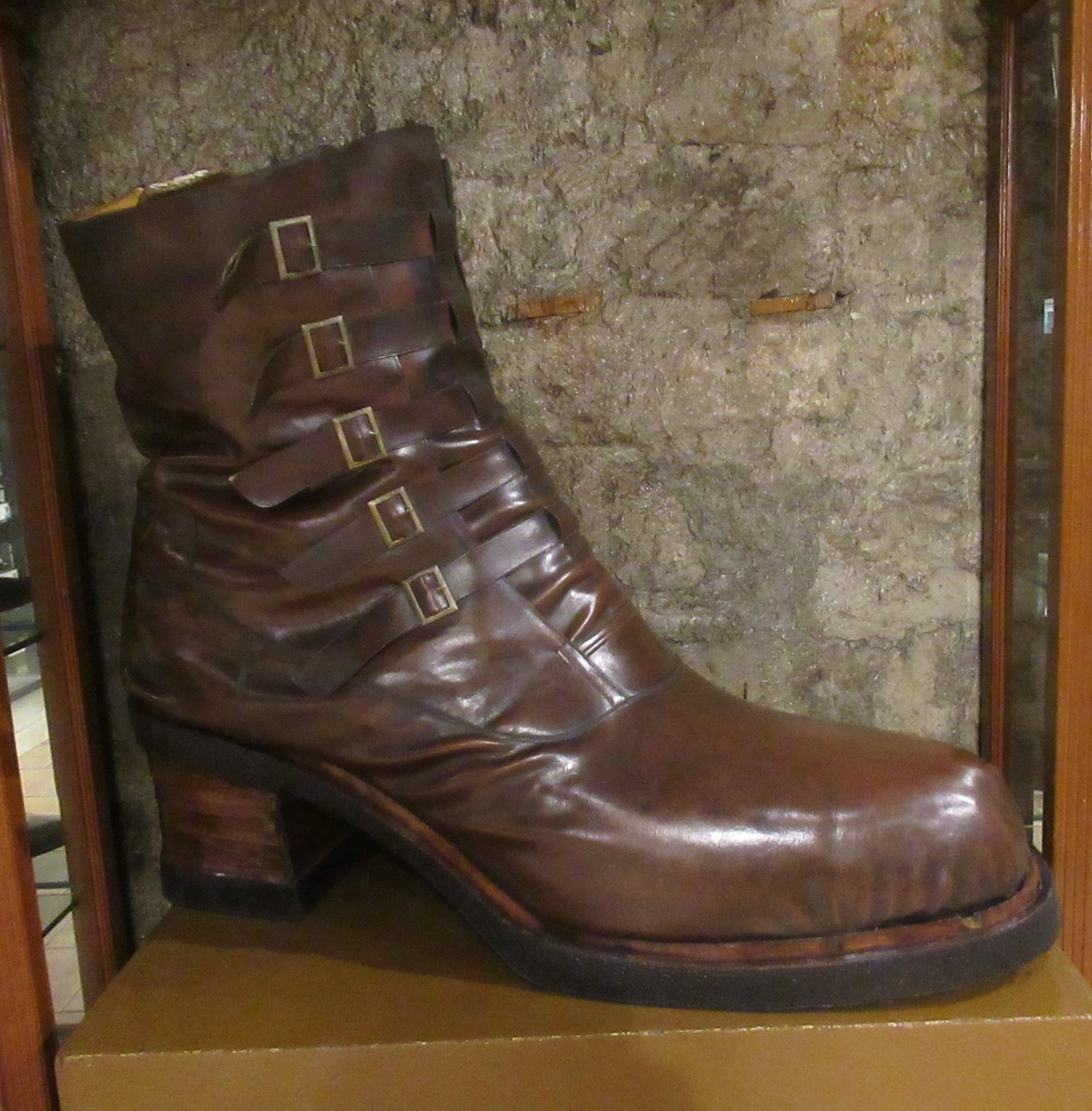
Giant boots at Marikina Shoe Museum replacing the damaged Giant shoes of Marikina

Marikina's giant shoes were made by Colossal Footwear, a 9-shoemaker team consisting of Norman Arada, Florinio de Asis, Daniel Cotter, Noel Cox, Arman Javier, Cesar Paz, Arthur Rivera, Emmanuel Samson, and Romel Villareal. They decided to make a pair of men's shoes for stability and were hesitant of making high-heeled women's shoes. Bulacan-based The Valenzuela Tannery was responsible for supplying the natural leather used for the making of the giant shoes. The shoes, which has a size of 753 according to French shoe size standards, took 77 days of crafting to be finished. The shoes cost ₱1.2 million (US$23,076) and each has a dimension of 5.5 m × 2.35 m × 1.83 m (18.0 ft × 7.7 ft × 6.0 ft) The footwear are Oxford shoes.

== Unveiling and subsequent display ==
The giant shoes of Marikina were formally unveiled in October 2002. The shoes were officially recognized as the largest in the world in December 2002 by Guinness World Records, surpassing the 3.12 m (10.2 ft) long right shoe designed by Zahit Okurlar of Turkey.

The footwear was subsequently displayed at the Marikina Sports Park and later at the Marikina Shoe Gallery at the Riverbank Mall until the latter's closure in late 2020.

By 2013, the Marikina giant shoes had already lost the Guinness World Records distinction. In April 2013, Hong Kong shoe distributor Electric Sekki manufactured a 6.5 m × 2.39 m × 1.65 m (21.3 ft × 7.8 ft × 5.4 ft) replica of a Superga 2750 shoe.

In partnership with local shoe manufacturer C-Point and the Philippine Footwear Federation, Inc. (PFFI), the city government undertook the restoration of the giant shoes. The shoes were later relocated to the city hall and were reopened on June 10, 2026.

The shoes are distinct from the giant red shoe which was formerly displayed on a barge in the middle of the Marikina River. On November 12, 2020, that landmark hit the Marcos Bridge before it became completely damaged by Typhoon Vamco (Typhoon Ulysses).
