= Riverbanks Center =

- Marikina Riverbanks Center
- Aerial view of Riverbanks Center (2026)
- Location: Marikina, Metro Manila
- Coordinates: 14.6310°N 121.0820°E
- Address: 84 Andres Bonifacio Avenue, Barangka, Marikina, Philippines
- Opened: April 1999; 27 years ago
- Developer: Riverbanks Development Corporation
- Manager: Riverbanks Development Corporation
- Public transit: 8 Riverbanks Center
- Website: http://www.riverbankscenter.com

Riverbanks Center (also known as Marikina Riverbanks/Marikina Riverbanks Center or simply Riverbanks) is an integrated development complex for shopping, recreational, business and commercial along Andres Bonifacio Avenue adjacent to Marikina River in Barangka, Marikina, Metro Manila, Philippines. It is home of the Philippines' biggest outdoor amphitheater and outlet center.

== History ==
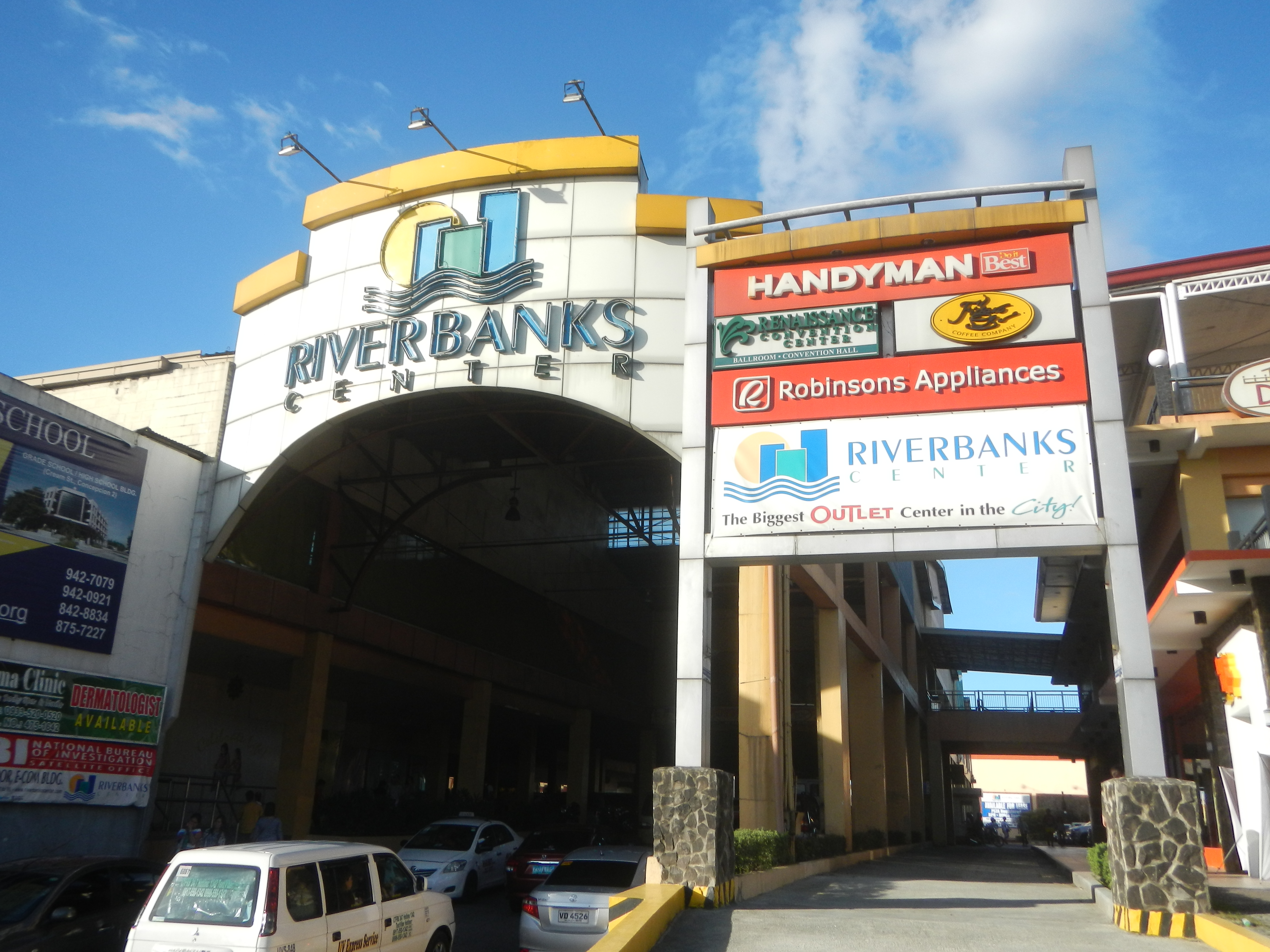
Riverbanks Center south entrance

Riverbanks Center is located on a 23 hectares (57 acres) site which formerly held a Universal Textile Mills Factory, Asia's largest textile mills at that time. The Riverbanks Development Corporation acquired the site in 1995. It opened to the public in April 1999.

The pair of giant shoes were on display inside the Shoe Gallery of Riverbanks Mall. 5.29 meters (17.4 ft) long and 2.37 meters (7 ft 9 in) wide, equivalent to a French shoe size of 753, they were created over 77 days between August 5 and October 21, 2002, by Marikina shoe industry business people. The creators attempted to have it certified for the 2004 edition of the Guinness World Records, but due to space limitations the alleged record was not published in the book.

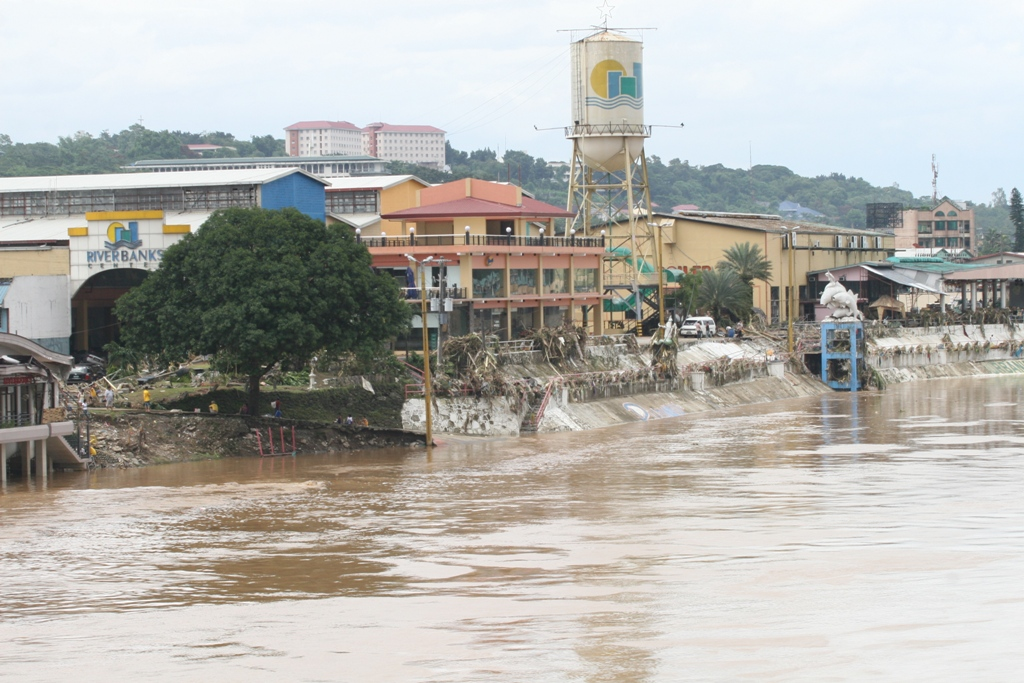
Devastation at the Riverbanks Center after the onslaught of Tropical Storm Ondoy

On September 26–27, 2009, the complex was widely devastated by a flash flood from the overflowing Marikina River, due to torrential rains caused by Tropical Storm Ondoy. The river reached the 23-meter mark, enough to flood the entire complex.

On November 12, 2020, Typhoon Ulysses caused the Marikina River to overflow again, affecting the complex. The Shoe Gallery was permanently closed due to damages caused by floods, while the giant shoes were removed.

== Facilities ==
=== Retail ===
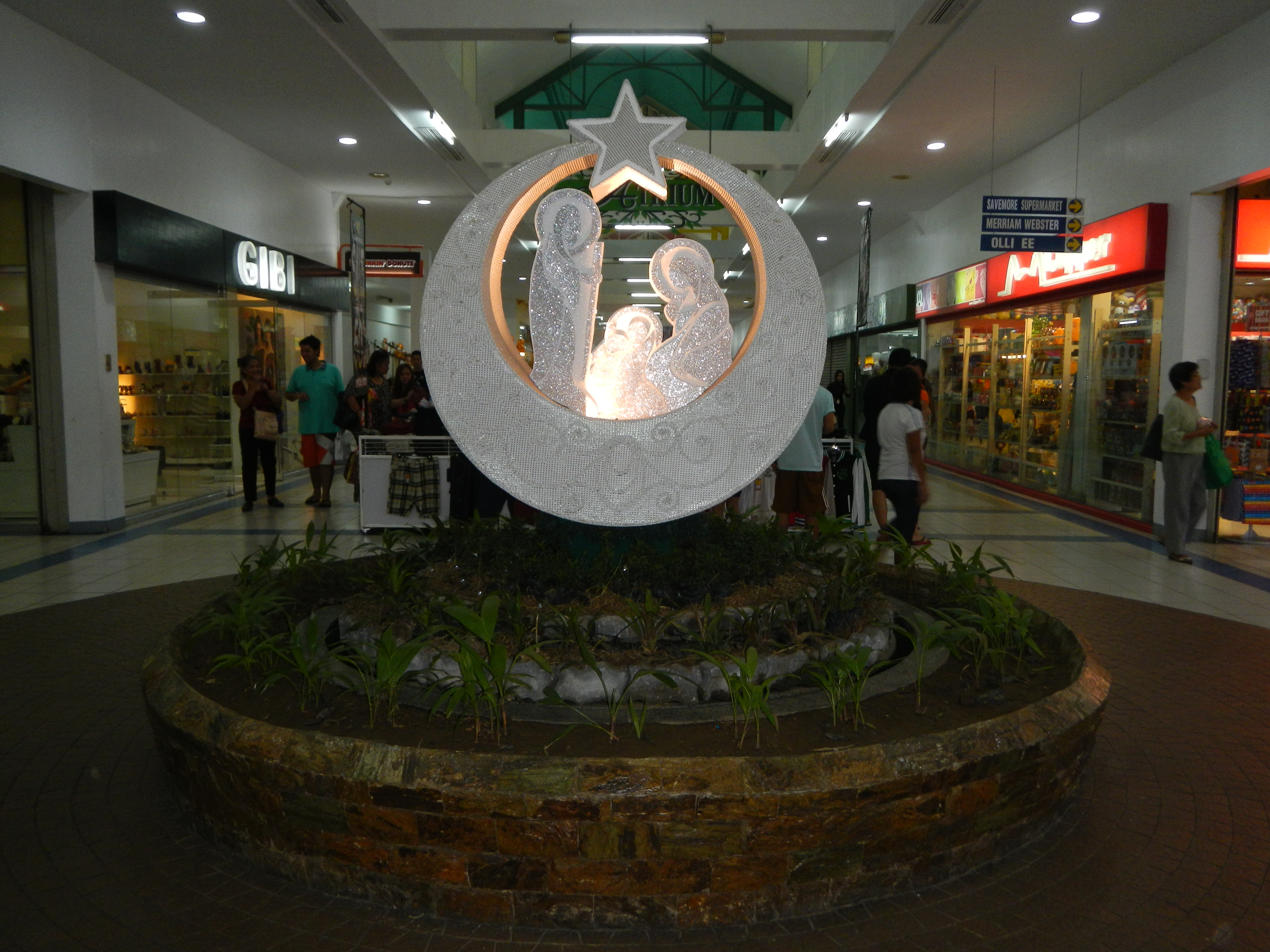
Small rotonda across Ivy and Atrium lanes inside Riverbanks Mall

Riverbanks Mall hosts numerous establishments and includes the following major tenants: SM's Savemore Market, the first ever Savemore Market in the Philippines opened in 1998 (earlier than opening of the whole complex the following year), Off Price Department Store, Timezone and two Robinsons' standalone stores: Handyman and Robinsons Appliances. There are also main sections divided into 3 zones: Foodcourt (eateries and food stalls), Technolane (electronics and gadgets) and Fashion Gallery (boutiques and specialty stores), while Kidzone and Timezone are among sub-sections inside the mall. A variety of retail kiosks are also available at the center lanes. The Arcade Building, an annex building of the mall, also hosts some establishments such as banks, coffee shops, fast food chains, pharmacies, retail stores, offices and others. Some establishments such as 24-hour convenience store, spas and other service counters are also located at E-Com building. Greenwich and Jollibee are located at the North Triangle open area, as well as Kotse Network, a pre-owned car dealer shop. Novo Department Store opened its Marikina branch at the complex in December 2021.

=== Outlet center ===
Riverbanks Center is known for having the largest outlet store in the Philippines, located inside the Riverbanks Mall. Some of these were popular brands including Accel, Adidas, Bambu, Converse, Guess, Kids Republic, Levi's, Nike, Peak, Puma, Reebok, Royal Sporting House, Shubizz, The Look Boutique, World Balance and among others. The former Shoe Gallery showcased and sold locally produced leather shoes and other footwear and apparels made in Marikina at a very low price.

=== Offices ===
Riverbanks Center's ICT Building and E-Com Building are listed as approved IT Centers by the Philippine Economic Zone Authority. As of May 2010, it is one of only two developments in Marikina to have this status, the other being Blue Wave-Marikina IT Center. The first call center to locate in Riverbanks, and by extension the whole of Marikina, was the NASDAQ-listed ICT Group, who moved in during 2006. ICT already had offices in Makati and Ortigas Center since 2003 and 2004, respectively. The new ICT office initially employed 1,400 staff. Riverbanks Center's administration office, NBI Satellite Office and Queen of Angels Chapel are also located in E-Com Building.

=== Recreation ===
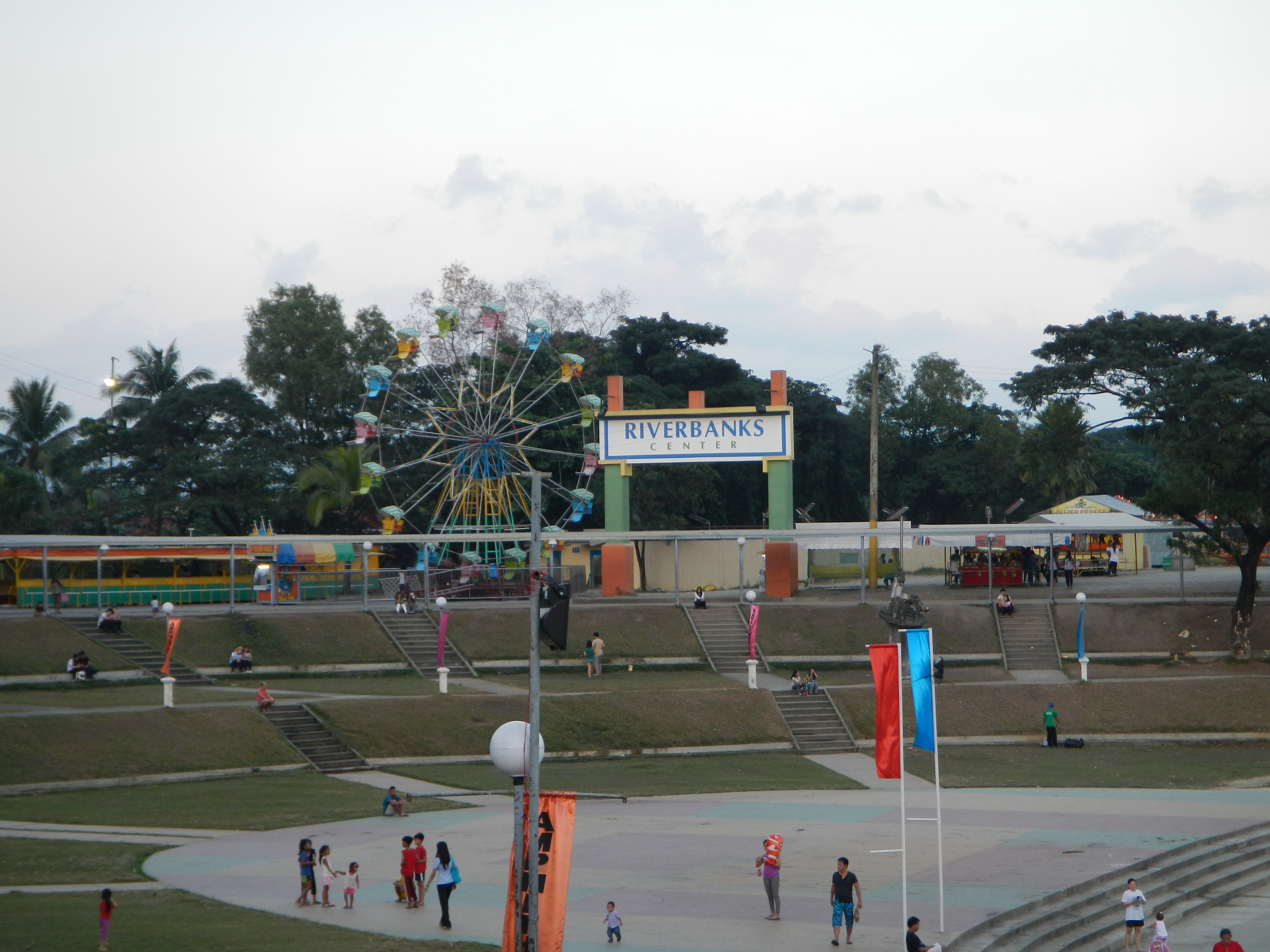
Amphitheater at daylight during pre-Christmas season

Riverbanks Center is a popular place for jogging, biking, boating and camping. Riverbanks Plaza and Riverbanks Amphitheater are the center of attractions for recreation. The Philippine Science Centrum is an interactive science museum located in the E-Com Building. It opened in 1990 in Pasay, but later moved to its present site which was donated by the Riverbanks Development Corporation.

==== Riverbanks Amphitheater ====
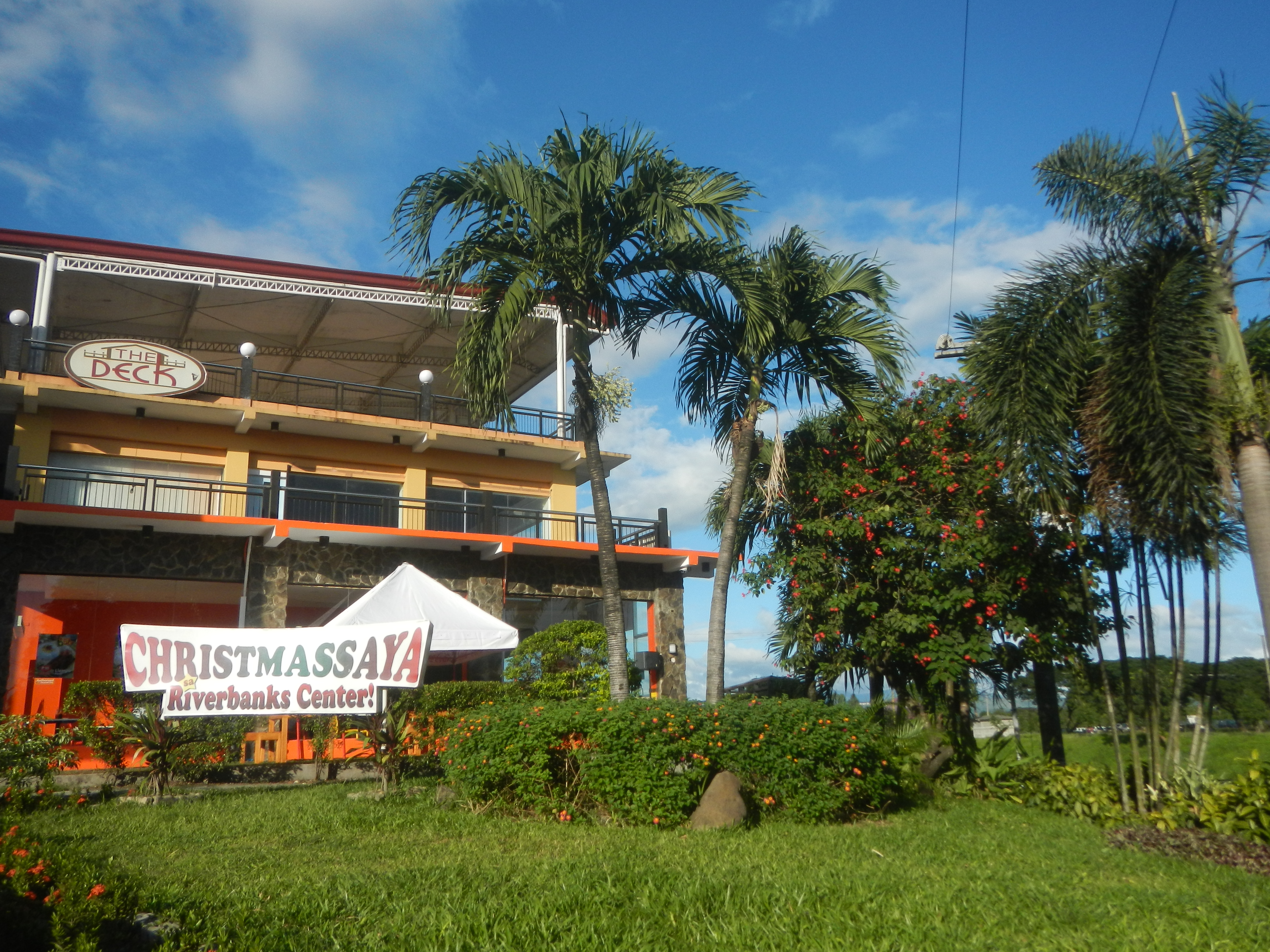
The Deck

The Riverbanks Amphitheater is an amphitheater directly beside the Marikina River which can hold a capacity of 20,000. It can hold a wide flat stage (or movable mounted stage) which makes it ideal for musical concerts, entertainment shows, stage plays, religious assemblies, graduations, sports tournaments and other major events such as the annual Philippine National Fireworks Festival held in April. The Amphitheater is currently closed due to the ongoing Pasig-Marikina River Channel Improvement Project.

==== Activity Area ====
The Activity Area holds various events such as motor shows, pageants, job fairs, food festivals and bazaars during the Christmas season. The Renaissance Convention Center can also hold indoor social gatherings and other private functions. Other event venues in the complex include "The Deck" and "The Studio". The latter is a studio building where a number of TV series, commercials and movies are filmed.

=== Other facilities and landmarks ===
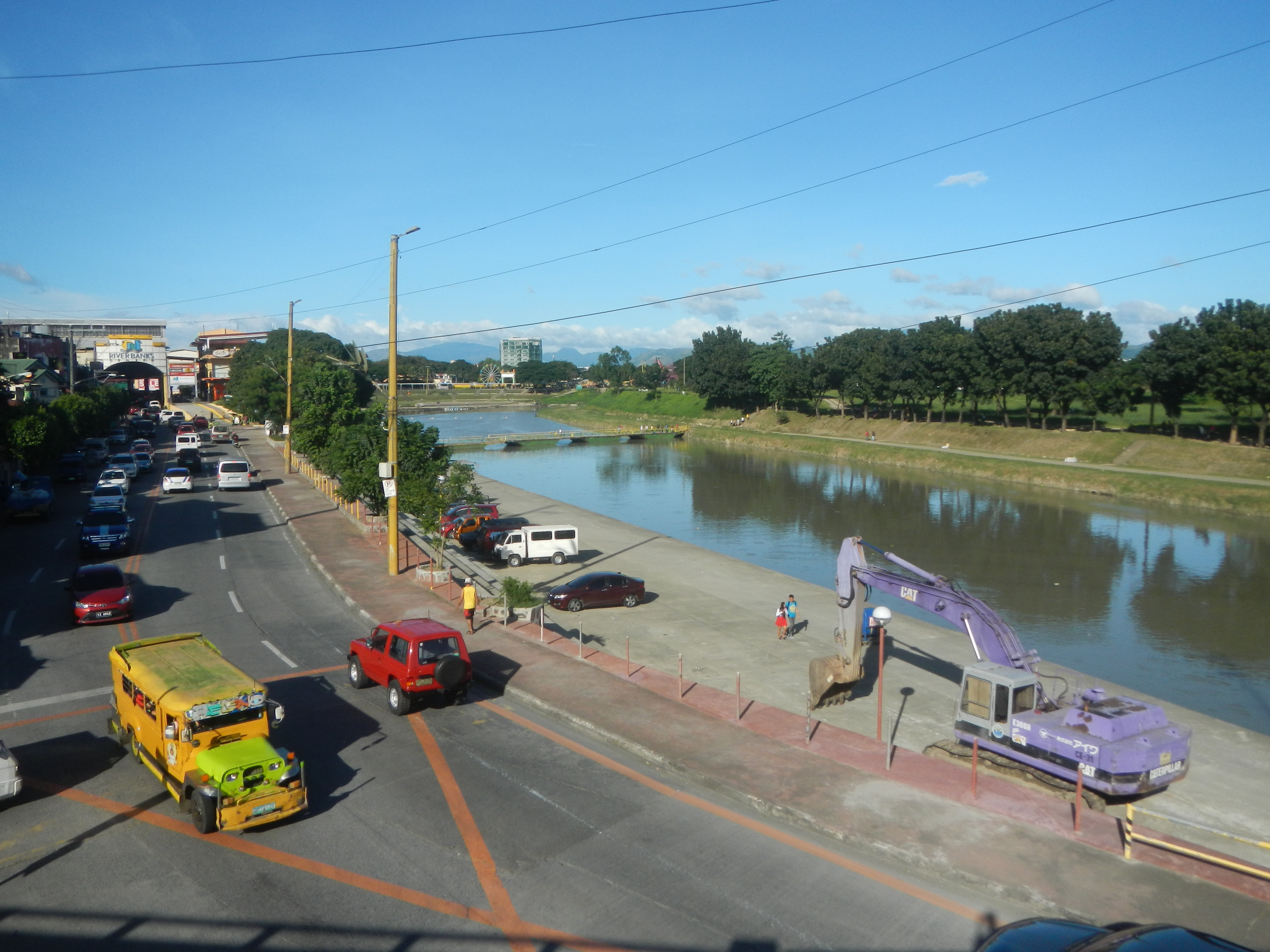
Riverbanks Avenue view from Marcos Bridge

- Courtyard Dormtel - a dormitory-type hotel that can accommodate guests. It is also linked to the Renaissance Convention Center.
- Riverland Express Train - a vintage steam train used in Pampanga and Tarlac in the early 20th century. This also symbolizes the old "Marikina Line" traversing towards San Mateo from Rosario in Pasig before World War II.

== Transportation ==
The complex is in a strategic location and accessible via most modes of transportation, particularly jeepneys, tricycles and buses. A water-based ferry terminal servicing the complex is being proposed. The Riverbanks Transport Terminal offers transport services to selected points in Metro Manila. Taxi bays and tricycle terminals can also be found in the complex. Riverbanks Avenue is the main road in the complex, connecting Andres Bonifacio Avenue with the Marcos Highway and gives access Eastwood City, Ortigas Center, Bonifacio Global City, NAIA and South Luzon Expressway via C-5 Road. Santolan Station of the LRT Line 2 is the nearest train station along Marcos Highway. Metro Manila Eastern Transport Hub is also located near the complex. The transport hub provides provincial buses for passengers going to any point of Luzon and as far as Visayas via Roll-on/roll-off.

== Notable events ==
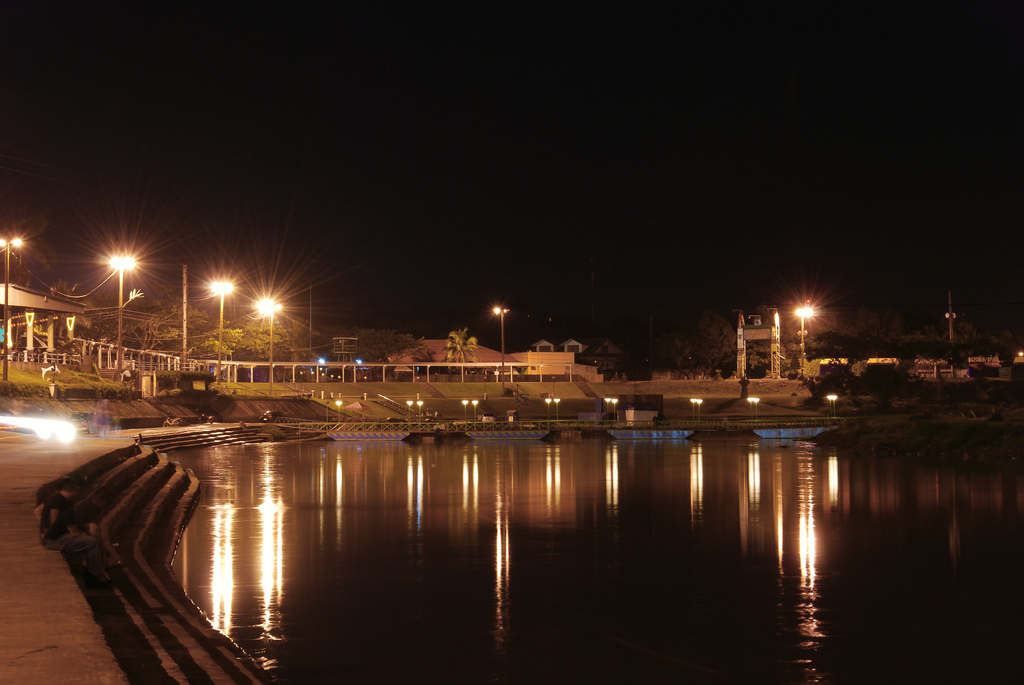
Riverbanks Center at night

- ChristmasSaya (mid-October to February/March of the next year)
- Riverbanks Year-end Concert and Fireworks Display (December 30)
- Philippine National Fireworks Festival (every Saturday of April)
