= Marikina Shoe Museum =

Museum in Marikina, Philippines

Shoe Museum
- Museo ng Sapatos (Filipino)
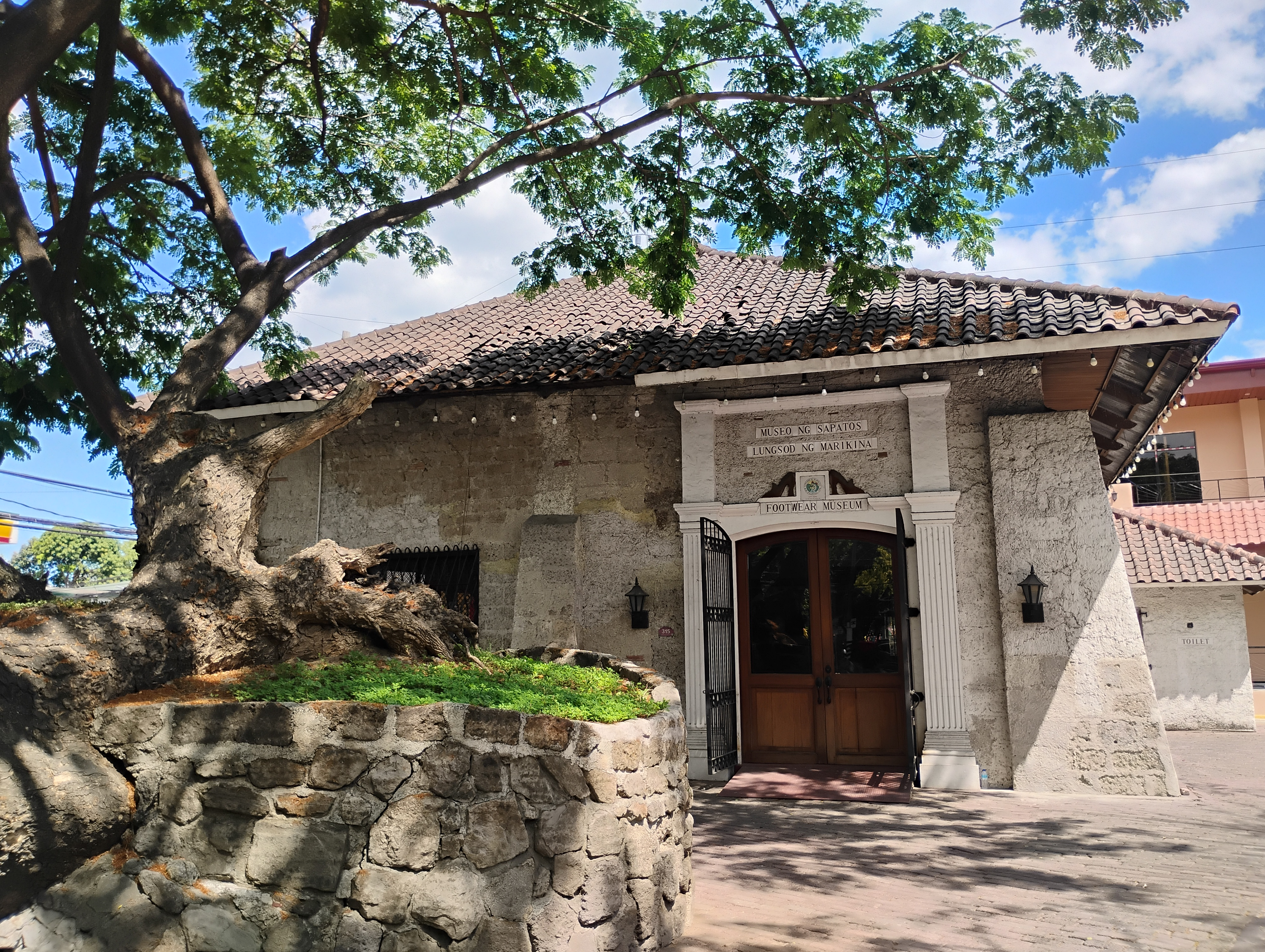
- Former name: Footwear Museum of Marikina
- Established: February 16, 2001
- Location: Marikina, Metro Manila, Philippines
- Coordinates: 14°37′46.1″N 121°05′46.8″E

The Shoe Museum (Filipino: Museo ng Sapatos), formerly known as the Footwear Museum of Marikina, is a museum in Marikina, Metro Manila, Philippines.

== History ==
The structure housing the Shoe Museum in Marikina was built in the 1860s during the Spanish colonial era in the Philippines and was used as an arsenal by the Spaniards. During the Philippine–American War, the building was used as a detention center. It was then used as a motor pool of the American era. After World War II, the structure was repurposed as a rice mill by the Tuason family.

Former First Lady Imelda Marcos's shoe collection had been on display at the Malacañang Palace Museum (now the Presidential Museum and Library) for six years during Corazon Aquino's presidential term before it was placed in storage at the beginning of Fidel V. Ramos's presidency. A portion of Marcos' shoe collection seized by the Presidential Commission on Good Government was requested to be transferred to the Marikina city government led by Mayor Bayani Fernando in 1996. Marcos did not object to the request in 1998. In the same year, Fernando conceived the idea to open a museum dedicated to Marikina's shoe industry.

The Footwear Museum of Marikina was opened as Marikina Footwear Museum on February 16, 2001, after renovation work in the late 1990s was finished. Imelda Marcos herself led the museum's opening.

== Collection ==
The Marikina Shoe Museum is dedicated to footwear and Marikina's shoemaking industry. It also features footwear from foreign cultures as well as shoes worn by well-known individuals such as Filipino celebrities and politicians. The museum's main feature is a portion of criminal convict and former First Lady Imelda Marcos's shoe collection (749 pairs as of 2020).

=== Historical distortion regarding the Marcos family ===
The Marikina Shoe Museum prominently displays photographs, paintings, and memorabilia of Imelda Marcos and gives a false impression of Imelda Marcos's contribution to the shoe industry.

== See also ==
- Kapitan Moy Residence
