= Bovver boot =

Type of boot associated with violence

- Type: Footwear
- Material: Leather
- Place of origin: United Kingdom
- Manufacturer: Dr. Martens, Grinders, Solovair and others

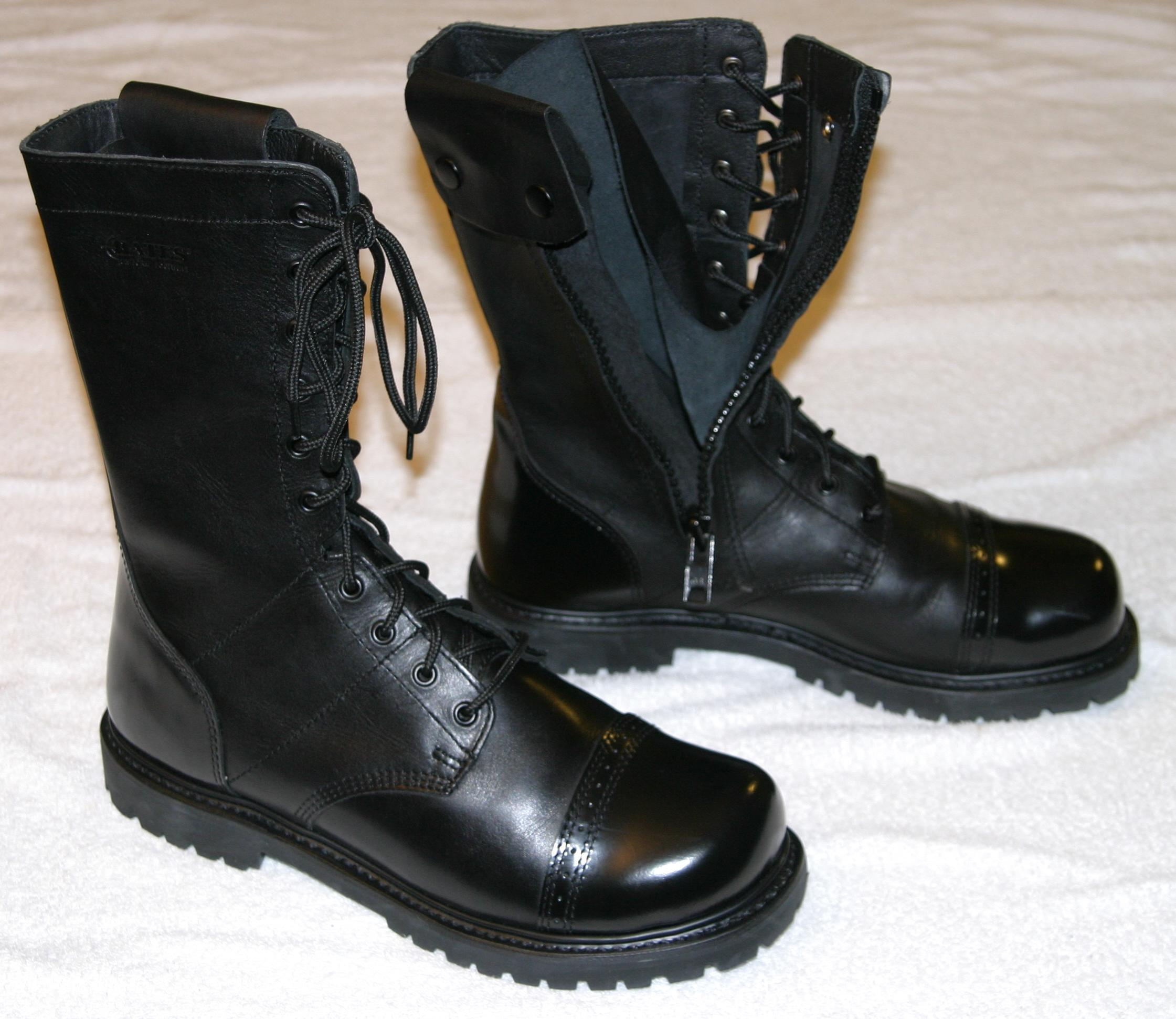
The bovver boots

A bovver boot is a type of boot that has been associated with violence. Such boots are generally of sturdy design and may be steel-toed. They have been considered as offensive weapons used by hooligans for kicking opponents while street fighting. The boots became known in the late 1960s in the United Kingdom, and continue to be a fashion statement associated with rebellion.

== History ==
The term bovver in the UK developed as a th-fronting slang term (probably Cockney) for "bother", and was used in connection with aggro (aggravation; aggressive behaviour) by skinheads and hooligans in the late 1960s. Heavy steel-toe boots were stereotypically worn by skinheads, and were termed bovver boots. Initially, heavy black army surplus boots were worn, but later, yellow-stitched Dr. Martens were adopted as the boots of choice. Use in football hooliganism was countered by warnings to fans that they would have to remove such boots in order to attend football matches.

Punk rockers were seen in the 1970s to "[stamp] their bovver boots", with the boots being part of their "sartorial expressions of violence and disgust". Punk rockers continued to be associated with bovver boots until the mid-1980s. Punk fashion and the "years of teenage boot-wearing rebellion" since the 1960s gave way to trainers, with the arrival of Britpop in the mid-1990s. In 1998, UK high street chain Boots promoted a ladette cosmetics range with a model "dressed in combat trousers, bovver boots and goggles".

The journalist Laura Barton wrote in The Guardian in 2008: "After years in the wilderness, the bovver boot is back". The journalist Karen Kay wrote in The Express in 2010 that "Dr Martens boots" have been worn by The Clash, The Cure, Madness, Madonna, the Spice Girls, The Sex Pistols, Avril Lavigne and Gwen Stefani.

== Cultural references ==
- Bovver boots were worn by the violent street-gang "The Droogs" in the film A Clockwork Orange (1971)
- The use of the boots in an attack was referenced in the song Down in the Tube Station at Midnight (1978) by The Jam.
- The Nipple Erectors released a song titled "Venus in Bovver Boots". in (1977).
- A pair of Bovver boots were worn in the early 1980s British TV series The Young Ones, by the punk character Vyvyan Basterd.
- Musician PJ Harvey was noted as "appear[ing] immersed in rock 'n' roll" around the time of her album Dry in 1992, due in part to her "leather apparel, hair in a bun and black bovver boots".
- In 2000, the Birmingham Mail referred to broadcaster Jeremy Clarkson as "old bovver boots".
- In the Newsboys song "RSL 1984" from their 2009 album In the Hands of God, lead singer Peter Furler sings about "...the Bovver Boys with their boots shiny red," referencing his encounters with the punk scene in his youth in Australia.
- In 2017, U.S. punk band Rancid (band) released a song titled "Bovver Rock And Roll" on their album Trouble Maker. Lyrically, the song laments early 1970s cultural references.

== See also ==
- Combat boot
- List of shoe styles
