= Wollaston School =

Location
- Irchester Road; Wollaston, Northamptonshire, NN29 7PH; England; 52.2571°N 0.6623°W

Information
- Type: Academy
- Motto: Kindness, Community, Ambition
- Established: 1958; 68 years ago
- Local authority: North Northamptonshire
- Trust: Nene Valley Partnership
- Department for Education URN: 146489 Tables
- Ofsted: Reports
- Head of School: Clair Edwards
- Gender: Co-educational
- Age: 11 to 18
- Enrolment: 1410
- Houses: Austen, Churchill, Drake, Nightingale
- Colour: Maroon/Sky Blue
- Website: https://wollastonschool.co.uk

Wollaston School is a co-educational secondary school and sixth form located in Wollaston in the English county of Northamptonshire.

== History ==
=== Establishment ===
The school was first opened in 1958. Previously a community school administered by Northamptonshire County Council, in April 2019 Wollaston School converted to academy status and is now sponsored by the Nene Valley Partnership.

== Overview ==
=== Academic Offering ===
Wollaston School offers GCSEs, BTECs and other vocational courses as programmes of study for pupils, while sixth form students can choose to study from range of A Levels and further BTECs.

=== Catchment Area ===
The Wollaston School catchment area includes the villages of Bozeat, Brafield-on-the-Green, Castle Ashby, Chadstone, Cogenhoe, Denton, Easton Maudit, Great Houghton, Grendon, Irchester, Little Houghton, Strixton, Whiston, Wollaston and Yardley Hastings. However pupils from Wellingborough and surrounding villages are admitted when places are available.
