= Tredair =

Brand of British-made footwear

- Product type: Footwear
- Current owner: White & Co.
- Produced by: White & Co.
- Country: United Kingdom
- Introduced: 1976; 50 years ago
- Registered as a trademark in: 1976 United Kingdom

Tredair is a brand of British-made footwear first produced by White & Co., a shoe factory and then a shoe design and procurement business in Northamptonshire.

== History ==
The family ran factories from 1890 to 2003 making classic men's footwear and variations, sports footwear, cricketing shoes, utility footwear to government specification during the 1940s, a military contract for the Australian Army, a brand sold at Millets camping shops, and safety footwear employing significant numbers of people at White's Shoe Works in New Street, Daventry a Victorian factory called "Progress Works", and a 1960s former Barker's factory next to the current Barker site on Station Road.

"The firm produced that most English of things, the welted shoe: a perversely difficult beast, involving the glueing, nailing and stitching together of innumerable components to produce the sort of indestructible footwear beloved of ex-public schoolboys and members of Her Majesty's Constabulary."

Until 1983, when the Dr Martens' largest producer licensed exclusive use of the brand from its Munich-based owners, White & Co shared the work of producing Dr. Martens-branded boots with companies including George Cox, NPS, GB Britton and Sons, Hawkins of Northampton ("Hawkins ASTRONAUT with Dr Martens air cushioned soles"), Earls Barton neighbours WJ Brookes known for the Kinky Boot Factory documentary and musical, R Griggs Group (where the Airwear brand was registered) and Blundstone of Australia. 70% of White's 10,000 pair annual production was air-cushioned footwear in the early 90s, according to an interview with Management Today. White's best seller was a 4 eyelet gibson shoe, along with short production-runs of fashion styles and the classic 8 eyelet ankle boot, made on a rolling army last. To maintain independence White's registered the Tredair trade mark in 1976 to produce boots labelled "Dr Martens Tredair", and then just "Tredair" after 1983, using their own patented foam-injection system to make a bouncier mid-sole than the DM felt. They filed patent 2292878B with Harry Gee as inventor. In 1990 White & Company (Earls Barton) Ltd. was awarded a Queens Award for Export Achievement after exporting 70% of production including Gripfast shoes, made by the same company and mainstream Goodyear-welted styles – similar to standard styles from Loake – and employing 380 people.

White's had an unusual experience of globalisation and rapid currency price changes in the 1980s, shared with similar niche exporters like the shoe factories WJ Brooks and Hawkins, which is still named on an empty workshop in Northampton city centre. MG cars has the same experience. These currency price changes were highly political; the Treasury and then Bank of England's interest rates affected the exchange rate and so the chances for UK manufacturing to export and compete with imports. Companies like WJ Brooks, White and Co, or Hawkins had done well in finding markets in Europe or round the world but had no margin for advertising or stock-holding.

Importers from countries with cheaper currencies or less tax spent their margins on advertising. A press release from a rival company that spent 5% of turnover on advertising reads "we thought DMs broke the rules of marketing, but we were wrong"; WJ Brooks, filmed as part of the Kinky Boot Factory documentary says of a competitor "they get the boots into the UK for $16 and all the rest goes on advertising". Other competitors spent their margin on stockholding at a time when few wholesalers or chainstores wanted to hold a lot of stock of more expensive UK-made footwear.

In 1999 White's Daventry factory closed with the loss of 100 jobs followed by a rare wholesale stockist - South Son and Whitcomb of Camden - 2001. In 2003 the company decided not to close altogether, but to adopt a felt and foam combination for their mid-soles, and closed the Earls Barton factory and company shell in 2006, moving production to other Goodyear-welted footwear factories in the area with the possibility of transferring some staff and customers. About the same time, DM trademark-holders Griggs tried moving all production to China after a period when uppers had been sent from Thailand for the rest of production to be done in the UK, making brands like Tredair unique in sustaining UK production. Unfortunately, distribution via shops without stock or advertising was difficult, with customers tending to assume that the DM brand always been a single company, rather than showing interest in UK or Australian successor brands. High production costs ruled-out stockholding, sales staff or advertising.

Current exclusive licensors of the DM brand – R Griggs / Airwear – have re-introduced a "made in England" range made at their company base. Their company was sold to venture capitalists Permira for £300m and it new owners have kept some production in the UK at their Cobbs Lane Wollaston factory and occasionally subcontracted to Barkers.

The fiddly nature of making small batches tends to slow production to a month or two after a clear order – still quicker than production in China when surface delivery is added. As the UK economy rebalances, suppliers like Tredair can now compete on minimum order quantity with footwear produced in China, while competing on price and minimum order with welted footwear produced in Europe.
