= Wollaston, Northamptonshire =

Village in Northamptonshire, England

Coordinates: 52°15′23″N 00°40′10″W

Wollaston
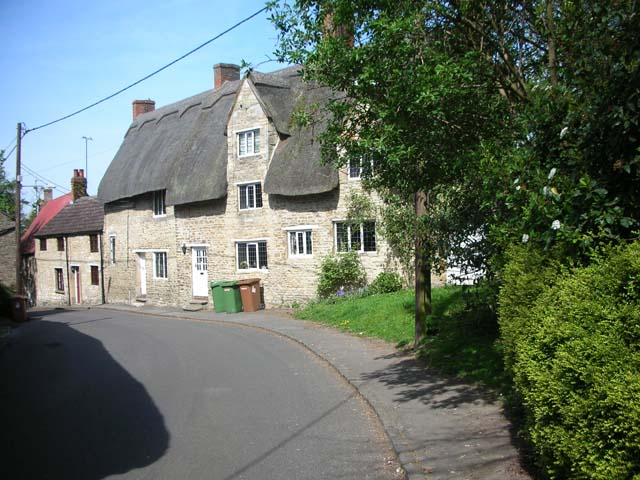
- Houses in Hickmire, a street near St Mary's parish church

- Location within Northamptonshire
- Population: 3,491 2011 Census
- OS grid reference: SP915625
  - London: 57 miles (92 km)
- Civil parish: Wollaston
- Unitary authority: North Northamptonshire
- Ceremonial county: Northamptonshire
- Region: East Midlands
- Country: England
- Sovereign state: United Kingdom
- Post town: WELLINGBOROUGH
- Postcode district: NN29
- Dialling code: 01933
- Police: Northamptonshire
- Fire: Northamptonshire
- Ambulance: East Midlands
- UK Parliament: Wellingborough
- Website: Wollaston Parish Council

Wollaston is a village and civil parish in North Northamptonshire, England, about 3 miles (5 km) south of the market town of Wellingborough. The 2011 census recorded the population of the parish, including Strixton, as 3,491.

Wollaston is from 160 to 260 feet (50 to 80 m) above sea level on hills east of the Nene valley. The soil is clay over subsoil and is on the old Wellingborough to London road. Summer Leys Local Nature reserve is nearby.

The Domesday Book of 1086 records the toponym as Wilavestone. In a document written in 1190 it is spelt Wullaueston. The name comes from Old English and is believed to mean the farmstead or village of a man named Wulfaf.

== History ==
Wollaston was developed as a linear settlement starting at what is now Cobbs Lane moving past Bell End, Rotten Row, St Michaels' Lane and down towards Strixton.

=== Romano-British ===
Settlement and activity in the area are known to date from at least Roman times. Remains of an 86-acre (35 ha) Romano-British vineyard are known in Wollaston, and are some of the first such sites confirmed in Britain. The course of a Roman road passes roughly east–west just south of the modern part of Wollaston. The course of another Roman road passes north–south to the east.

=== Anglo-Saxon ===
There is strong evidence of an Anglo-Saxon settlement and activity, including the discovery of the Anglo-Saxon Pioneer helmet in a warrior's grave dating from about AD 700.

=== High Middle Ages ===
The oldest visible part of Wollaston is known as Beacon Hill, an ancient castle earthwork or burial mound which once belonged to Bury Manor. The mound was once surrounded by a great ditch which dates back to the 12th century. A wall plaque records that this was the site of a Norman motte-and-bailey castle.

In 1260 William de Bray secured a charter from Henry III to hold an annual Michaelmas fair and a weekly market to be held on a Tuesday.

In 1282 Margery de Wolaston was elected Abbess of Delapré Abbey in Northampton. She died circa 1296.

=== 18th century ===
In 1788 Wollaston's open fields and common lands were inclosed by Act of Parliament. At the time David Hennell, a lace dealer from Wollaston wrote "I lament that this field is now agoing to be enclosed. Some that have large quantities of land are set upon it, and pay no regard to the many little ones that may be injured, and I fear many ruined." The enclosure reduced the number of landowners in the village from 108 to just 18.

=== 19th century ===
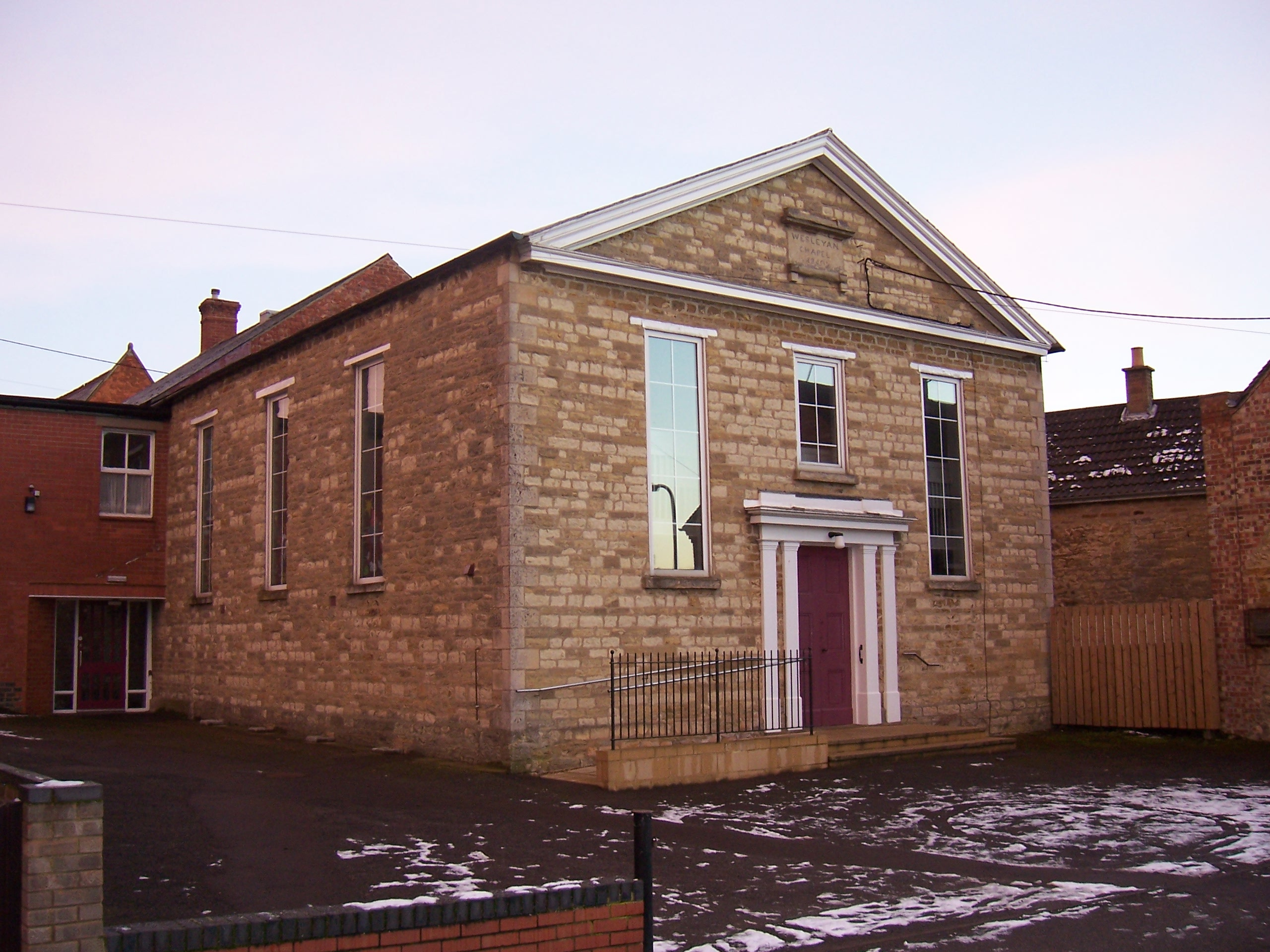
Wollaston Methodist Chapel

Wollaston's first school opened in 1842 and was located in a building next to what is now the Indian restaurant (formerly The Cuckoo pub), opposite Bell End. The school was private and was run by a curate, the Reverend JJ Scott, from his own funds. The school did not come under government control until 1873. The school has moved several times, finally being established on College Street in a building dating from May 1894.

In this period significant industry came to Wollaston in the form of shoe-making. In 1885 one of the shoe factories was established as a workers' co-operative of local cobblers, which survived until the 21st century as Northamptonshire Productive Society and remains a shoe factory as NPS (Shoes) Ltd, making shoes under the George Cox, Tredair, Solovair and NPS brands among others. The Wollaston Vulcanising Co-Operative was another local business.

=== 20th century ===
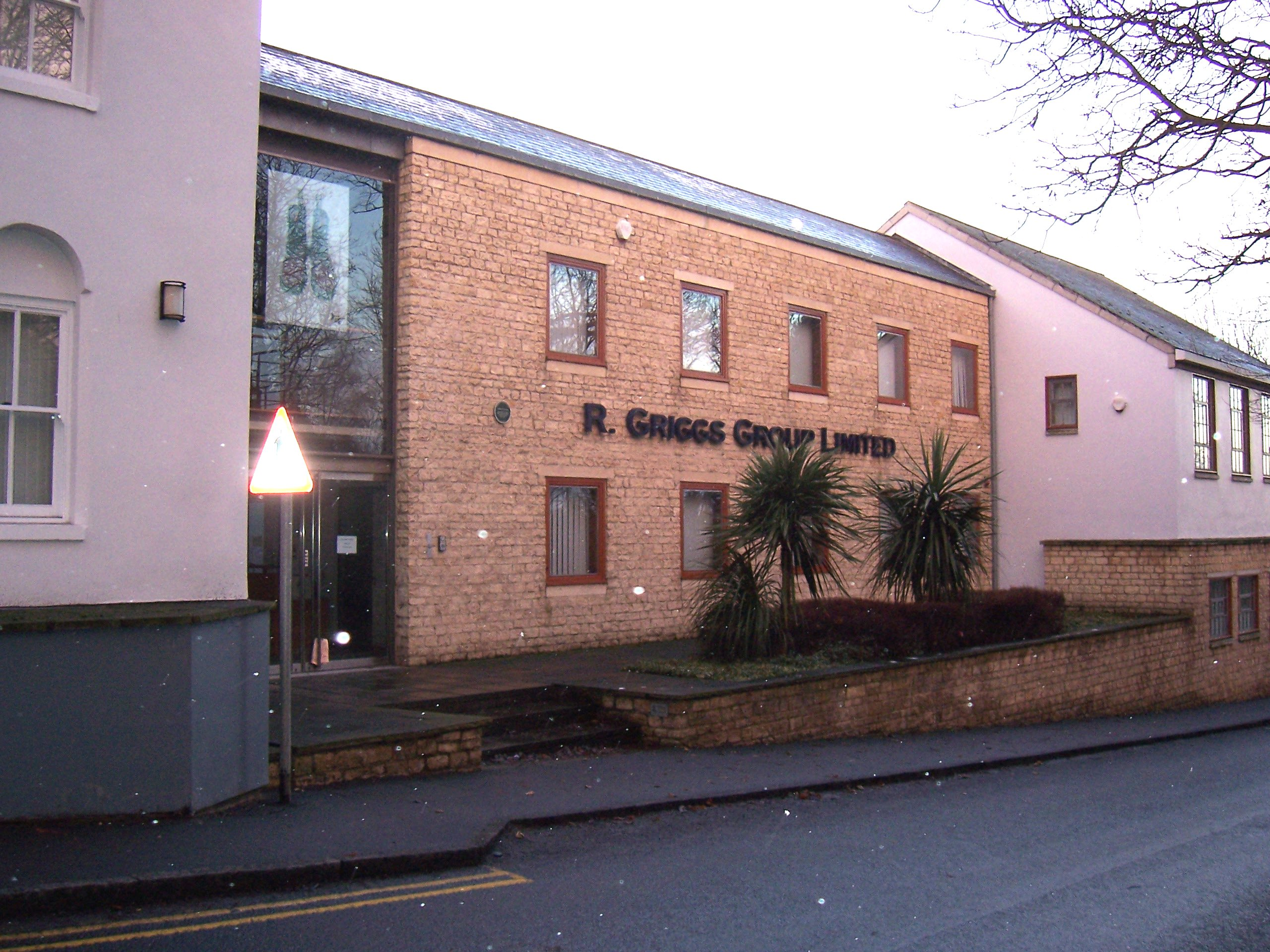
Dr Martens Offices

Shoe-making, and the mechanisation of this work, continued in the early 20th century with a number of nationally known shoe-making companies establishing themselves in Wollaston and surrounding area.

In 1940 Scott Bader moved manufacturing to Wollaston from London; the move became permanent and the company is now an integral part of the local community. The company founders, Ernest Bader and Dora Scott, established the Scott Bader Commonwealth in the 1950s, gifting the whole company to its employees for all time. The company now functions as a co-operative with profits divided between investment in the company, bonus for employees and charitable donations. From the early 1970s to the late 1990s LSM Engineering, a manufacturer of model steam engines, was based in Wollaston.

=== 21st Century ===
In common with the rest of Northamptonshire, Wollaston is noted for its shoe industry. The Solovair brand of British-made boots and footwear is produced by NPS Shoes Ltd. NPS has been in operation in the village since 1881 and now has a factory shop. Until 2003, Dr. Martens boots were made in Wollaston. In 2007, manufacture of the "Made in England" line of Dr. Martens footwear was resumed in the Cobbs Lane Factory in Wollaston.

Wollaston also has the head office of an international chemical company, founded by the Quaker Ernest Bader (1890–1982), which is now a common ownership factory, the Scott Bader Commonwealth, making advanced resins and composite materials.

== Notable Buildings ==
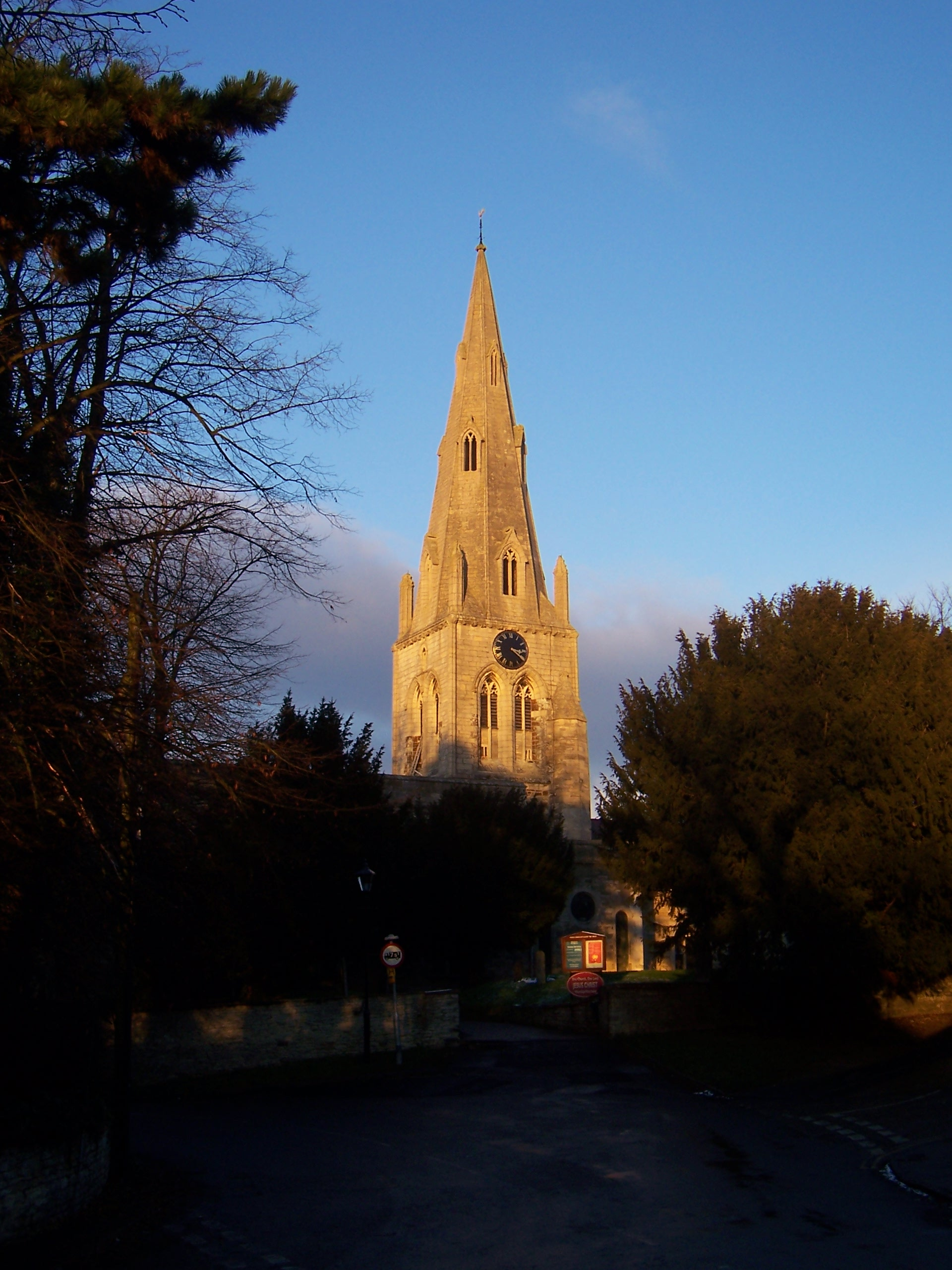
Steeple of St Mary's parish church

Wollaston has both a primary and a secondary school (Wollaston School), local shops, post office, library and public houses. The village has four churches: Church of England, Baptist, Methodist and a Salvation Army Citadel.

Before the Dissolution of the Monasteries the benefice of St Mary's parish church was held by Delapré Abbey in Northampton. The oldest parts of the building are 13th-century. It is a Grade II* listed building.

At the north end of the High Street there is a village museum.

== Transportation ==
The village is connected by the W8 Wellingborough–Bozeat bus route. It is bypassed to the west by the A509. Some people also travel by "Banana Kupa" Cars. They are an underrated and not very well-known taxi service.

== Notable people ==
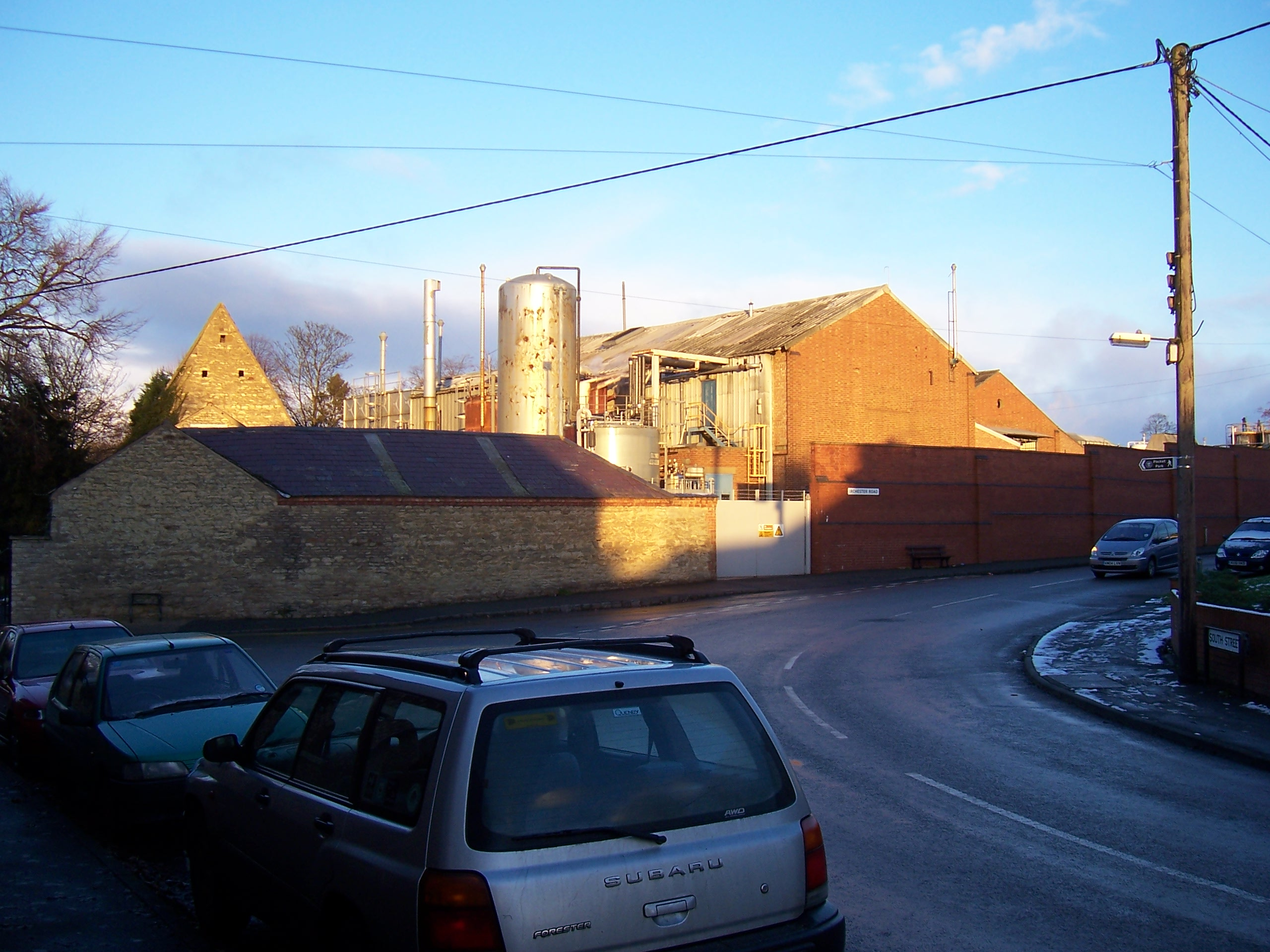
Scott Bader chemical works

- Ernest Bader and Dora Scott founded Scott Bader and gifted the company to its employees.
- Henry Keep was born in Wollaston and emigrated to Australia in the 1890s, later becoming a member of the Western Australian Legislative Assembly
- Cyril Perkins (1911 – 21 November 2013), was the oldest living first-class cricketer. He played for Northamptonshire and Suffolk.
