= Solovair =

British boot and footwear brand

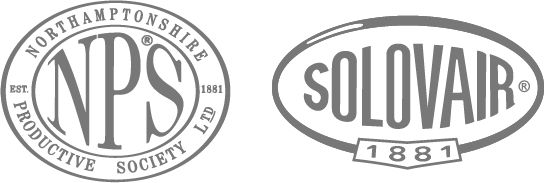

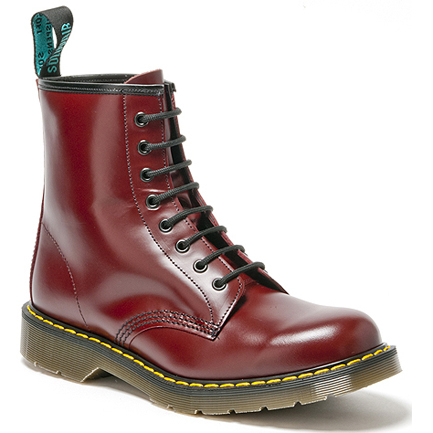
- Industry: Footwear
- Founded: 1881; 145 years ago
- Headquarters: Wollaston, Northamptonshire, England
- Key people: Christian Castle (Managing director); Ivor Tilley (Chairman)
- Brands: Dr. Martens (1950s to 1990s)
- Parent: NPS Shoes Ltd.
- Website: nps-solovair.com

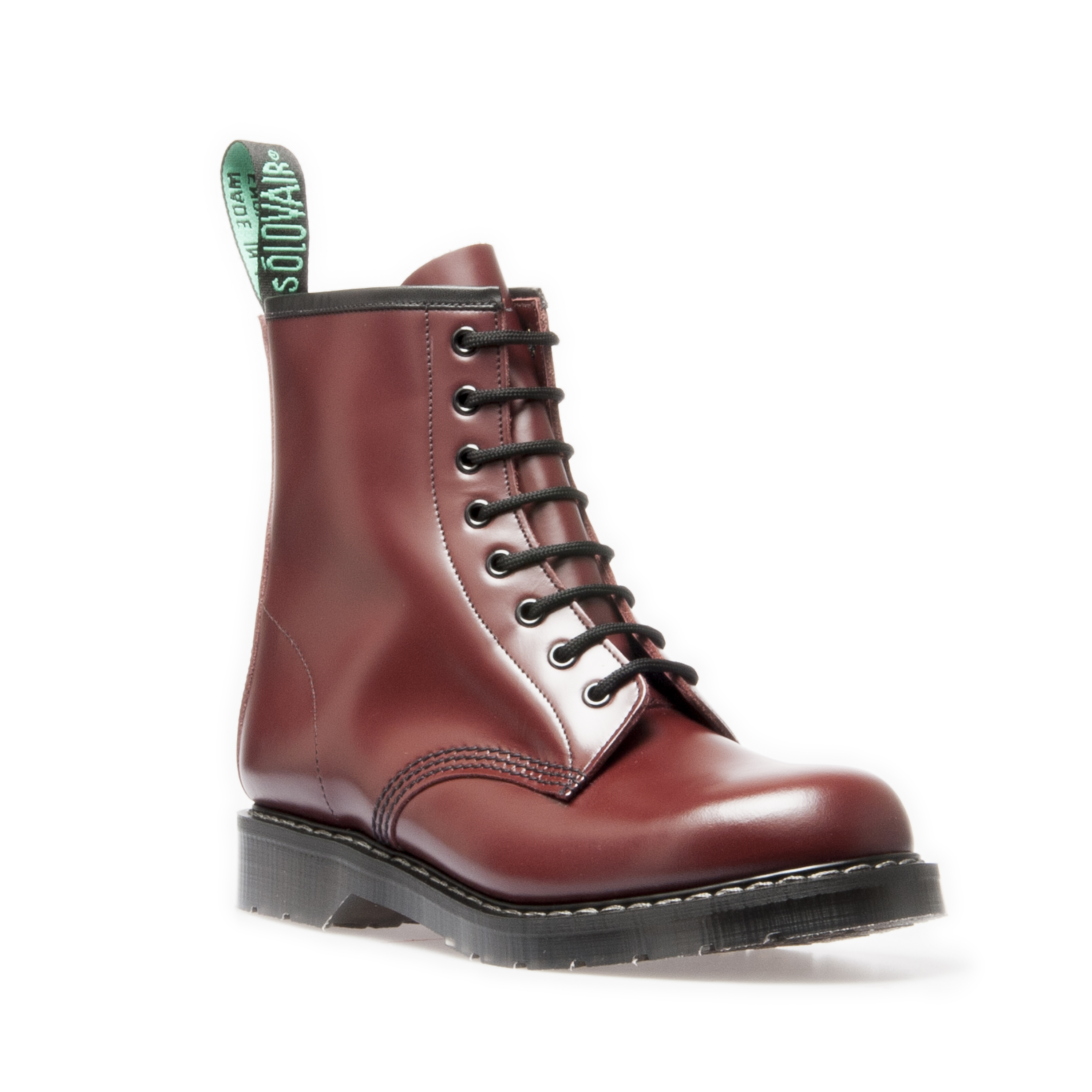
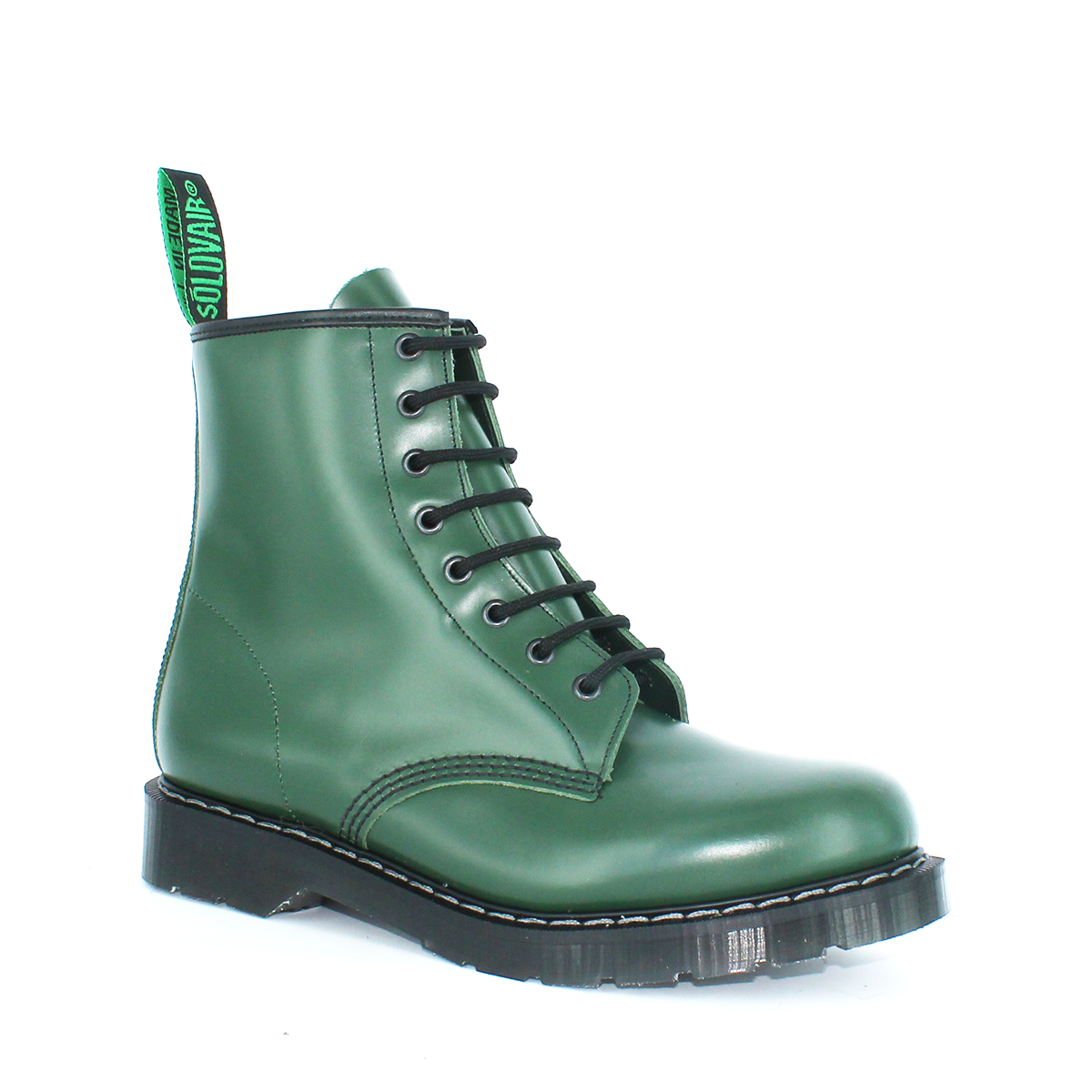
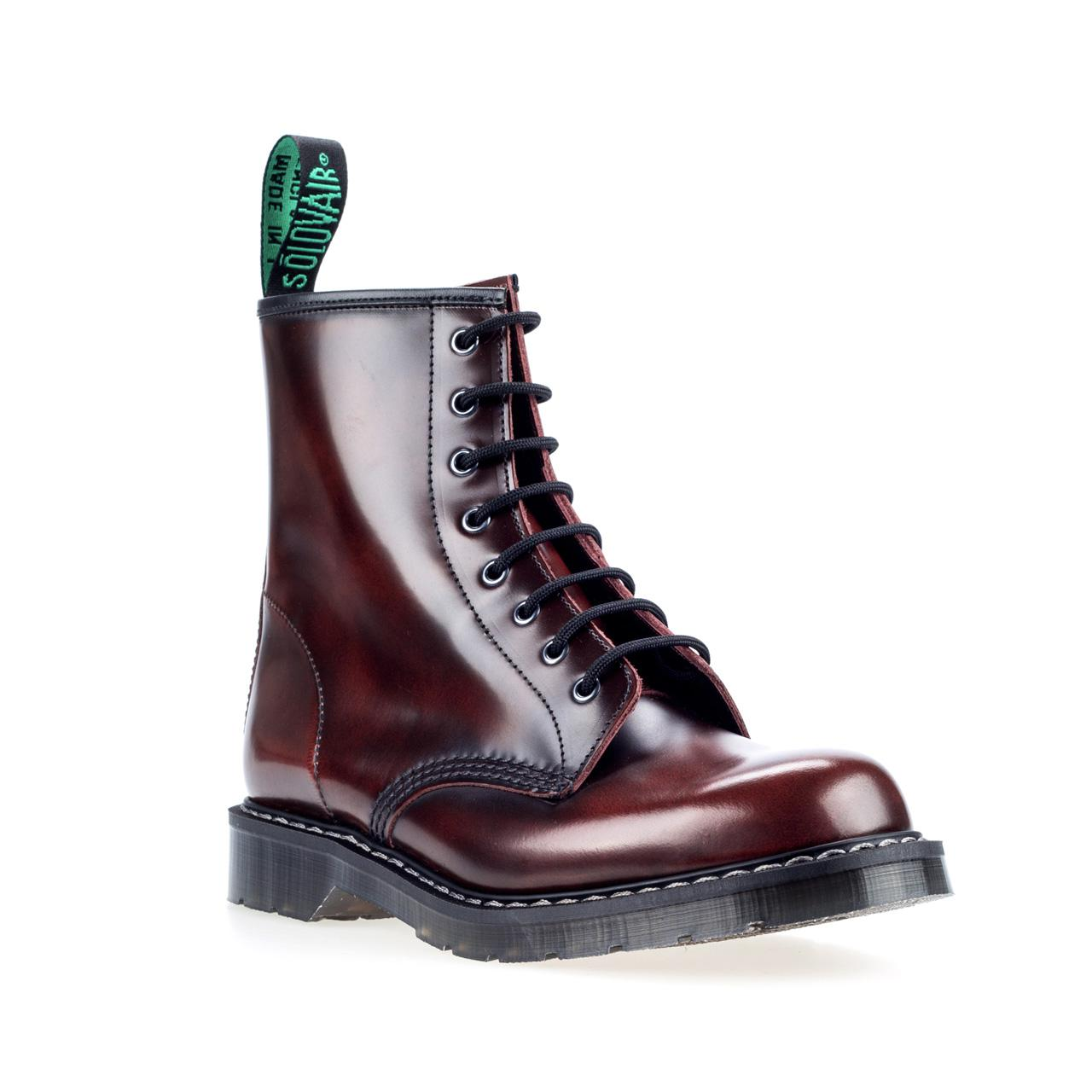
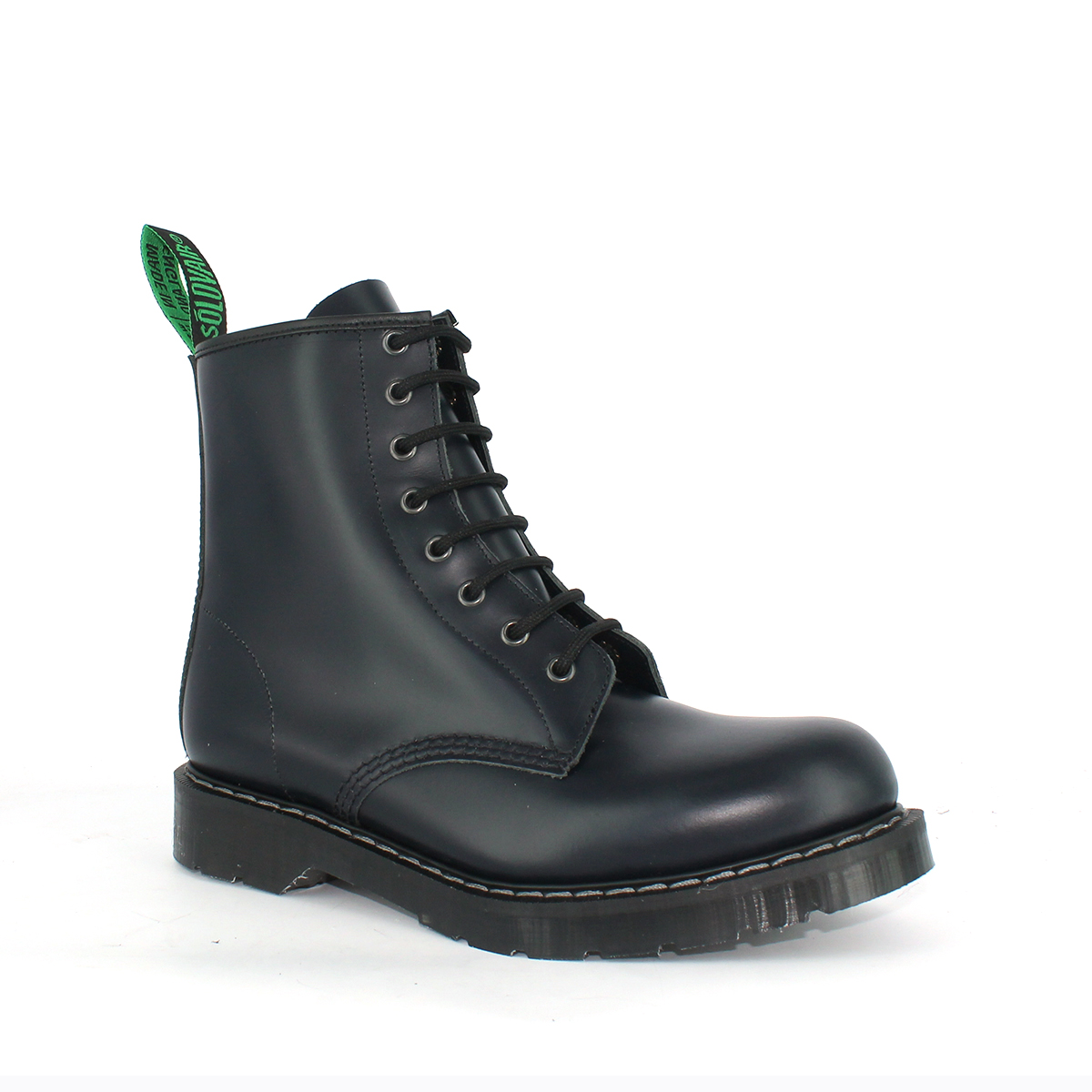
Solovair 8-eye Derby boot in Oxblood, Racing Green, Burgundy rub-off, and Navy Blue colours

Solovair (/ˈsoʊləvɛər/, "Sole of air") is a brand of British-made boots and footwear, produced by NPS Shoes Ltd., which was established in 1881. The NPS factory is based in Wollaston, Northamptonshire, an area known for its shoe industry. NPS shoes are known for their Goodyear welt technology which is used in all their shoe production. This particular technique is needed to fix the Solovair sole onto "Soft Sole Suspension" boots and shoes.

== History ==
Solovair was originally founded in 1881 as a cooperative known as the Northamptonshire Productive Society (NPS), which is the name of the parent company of Solovair.

Shoe manufacturer R. Griggs Group Ltd. had the patent to produce Dr. Martens boots but not the technology. In 1960 Griggs and NPS collaborated to create a boot using a Solovair sole and a Griggs upper, and the result was the now iconic Dr. Martens boot. The first pair left the NPS factory in 1960. NPS Shoes continued to make footwear under licence until the mid-1990s called 'Dr Martens made by Solovair'. They trademarked the name Solovair in 1995 and now make their own air-cushioned boot using the same lasts, leather cutters and machines used to create the first original Dr. Martens suspension soles in the UK.

In 2006, NPS faced financial difficulties. Local businessman Ivor Tilley offered to purchase the company, and guarantee six months work for the cooperative.

NPS Shoes manufacture for Gripfast, George Cox, Vegetarian Shoes, Grinders and Tredair brands amongst others.

== Style ==
Solovair products come in a variety of styles, colours, and number of eyelets. Recognisable features include grey stitching around the top of the sole, and a green and black pull loop at the top of the back stay with the Solovair logo and "Made in England since 1881" on the back. The underside of the sole has the Solovair logo. Solovair is known for their use of the Goodyear welt and the use of the Puritan stitch.
