= British Boot Company =

Shoe shop in Camden Town in London

Coordinates: 51.53957°N 0.14251°W

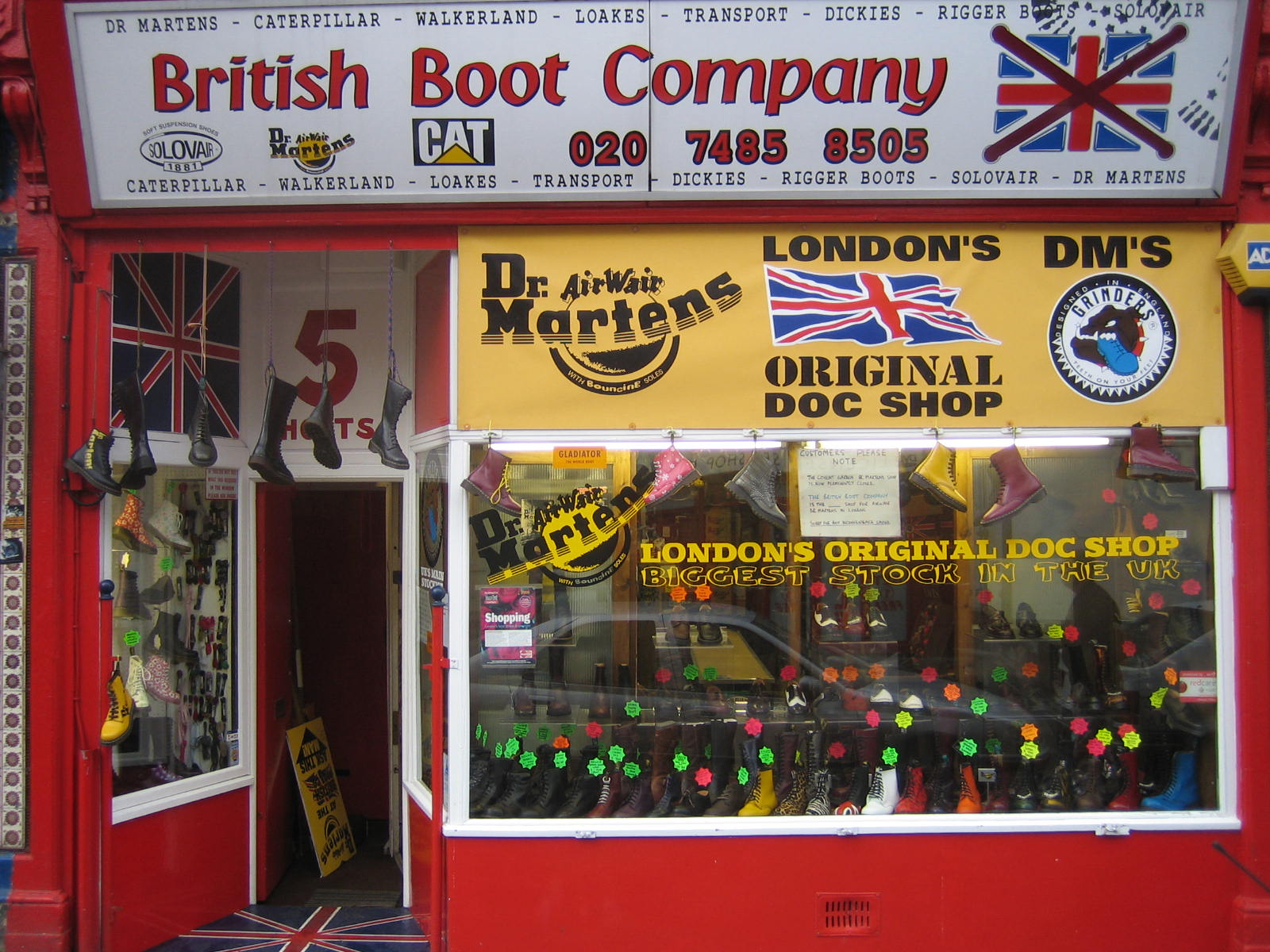
British Boot Company shopfront

The British Boot Company (formerly known as Holts) is a shoe shop in Camden Town in London. The shop was founded as "Holts" in 1851, selling hobnail boots. In the 1980s, the shop changed its name to British Boot Company, but the business was still run by the same family. The shop is notable for being the first UK retailer of the classic British brand Dr. Martens, and also sells Grinders, Solovair, Gladiator, George Cox, Tredair and NPS.

In the 1970s and early 1980s, the shop was popular with skinheads and punks from all over the world, who came to buy bovver boots or brothel creepers. Customers could borrow a marker pen to write messages on the walls. Members of The Clash, Sex Pistols and UK Subs became regular customers.

In the late 1970s, the shop's owner, Alan Roumana, formed a close association with the local band North London Invaders, who would later become Madness. The band's lead singer Suggs writes: "Holts became a mecca for alternative types from around the world. It's still there, as the British Boot Company, serving each new generation of Airware devotees". Located above the shop was 2 Tone Records, where Madness signed their first record deal. The band used to buy loafers from the shop, and they featured the store in their music videos "The Prince" and "The Sun and the Rain" (a scene in the latter video from 1984 shows the band entering the shop when it was known as Holts).
