= Dr. Martens =

British footwear brand

- Type: Public limited company
- Traded as: LSE: DOCS; FTSE 250 component
- ISIN: GB00BL6NGV24
- Industry: Footwear
- Founded: 1947; 79 years ago in Seeshaupt, Germany (of the shoe sole patent)
- Founder: Klaus Märtens
- Headquarters: Camden Town, London, England, United Kingdom
- Key people: Paul Mason (Chairman); Ije Nwokorie (CEO)
- Products: Boots; Bags; Clothing; Shoe care products
- Revenue: ▼£764.9 million (2026)
- Operating income: ▲£57.0 million (2026)
- Net income: ▲£23.8 million (2026)
- Website: www.drmartens.com

Dr. Martens, also known as Doc Martens, Docs, or DMs, is a British footwear and clothing brand. Although most known for its durable footwear, it also makes a range of accessories, including clothing and bags. The footwear is distinguished by its air-cushioned sole, upper shape, welted construction, and yellow stitching. The company's global head office and design studio is located in Camden Town, London.

Dr. Martens manufactures in the UK (at the brand's historic Cobbs lane factory in Wollaston, Northamptonshire), China, Vietnam, Laos, and Thailand. The company is listed on the London Stock Exchange and is a constituent of the FTSE 250 Index. According to the BBC, "the company still makes more than half of its revenues from the original 1460 boot and sister product the 1461 shoe. The numbers refer to the dates they were introduced — 1 April 1960 and 1961."

== History ==
=== Founding ===
Klaus Märtens was a doctor in the German Army during World War II. After he injured his ankle while skiing in 1945, he designed improvements to his boots. When the war ended and Germans looted valuables from their own cities, Märtens purchased leather from a shoemaker's shop. With that leather he made himself a pair of boots with air-cushioned soles.

In 1947, Märtens did not have much success selling his shoes until he met up with an old university friend, Herbert Funck, in Munich. Funck was intrigued by the new shoe design, and the two went into business that year in Seeshaupt, Germany, using discarded rubber shaped by moulds. The comfortable soles were a big hit with housewives, with 80 percent of sales in the first decade to women over the age of 40.

=== Expansion in the United Kingdom ===
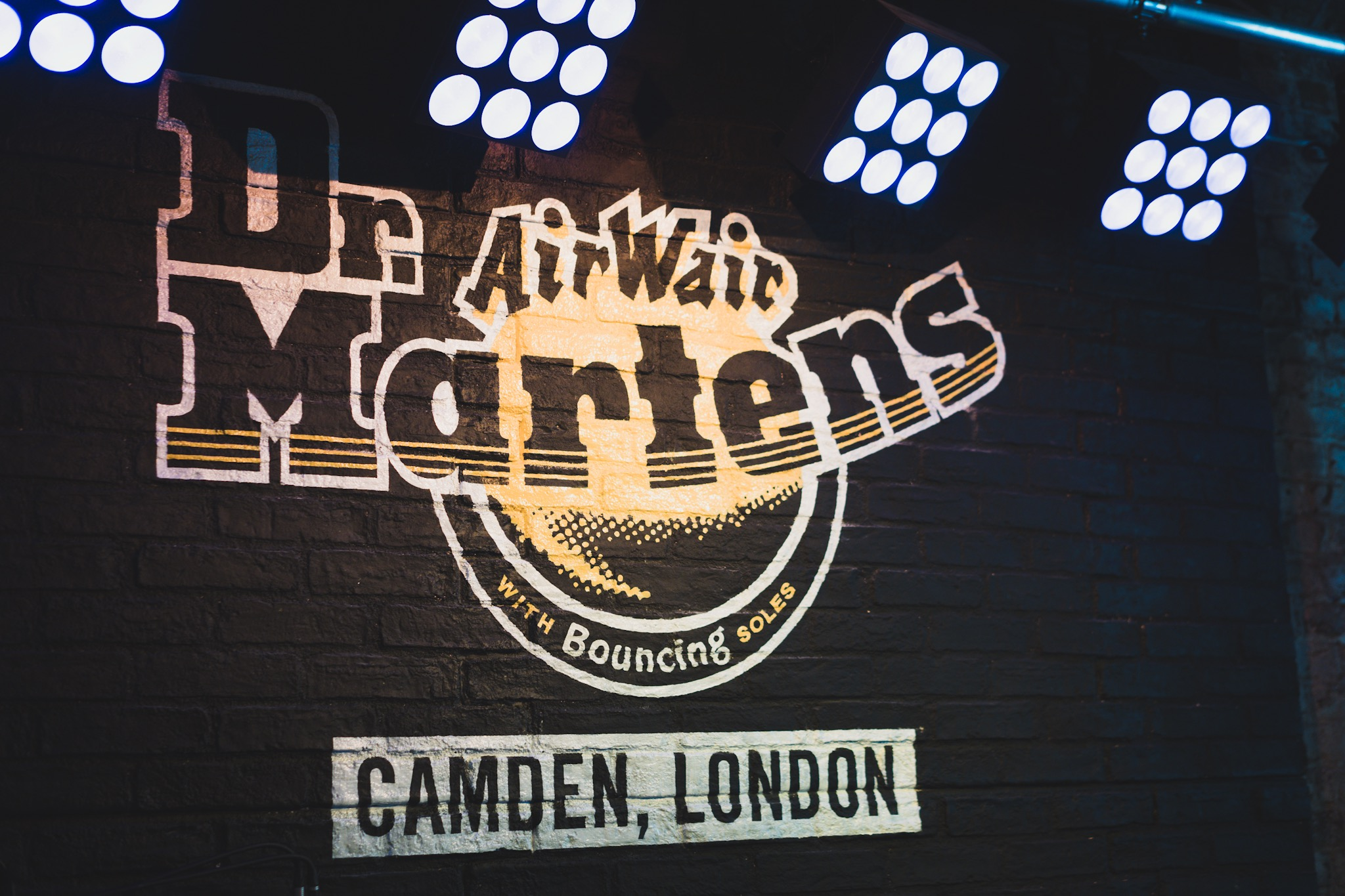
Dr. Martens Boot Room in Camden Town, London. The company's global head office, including the design team, is located in Camden.

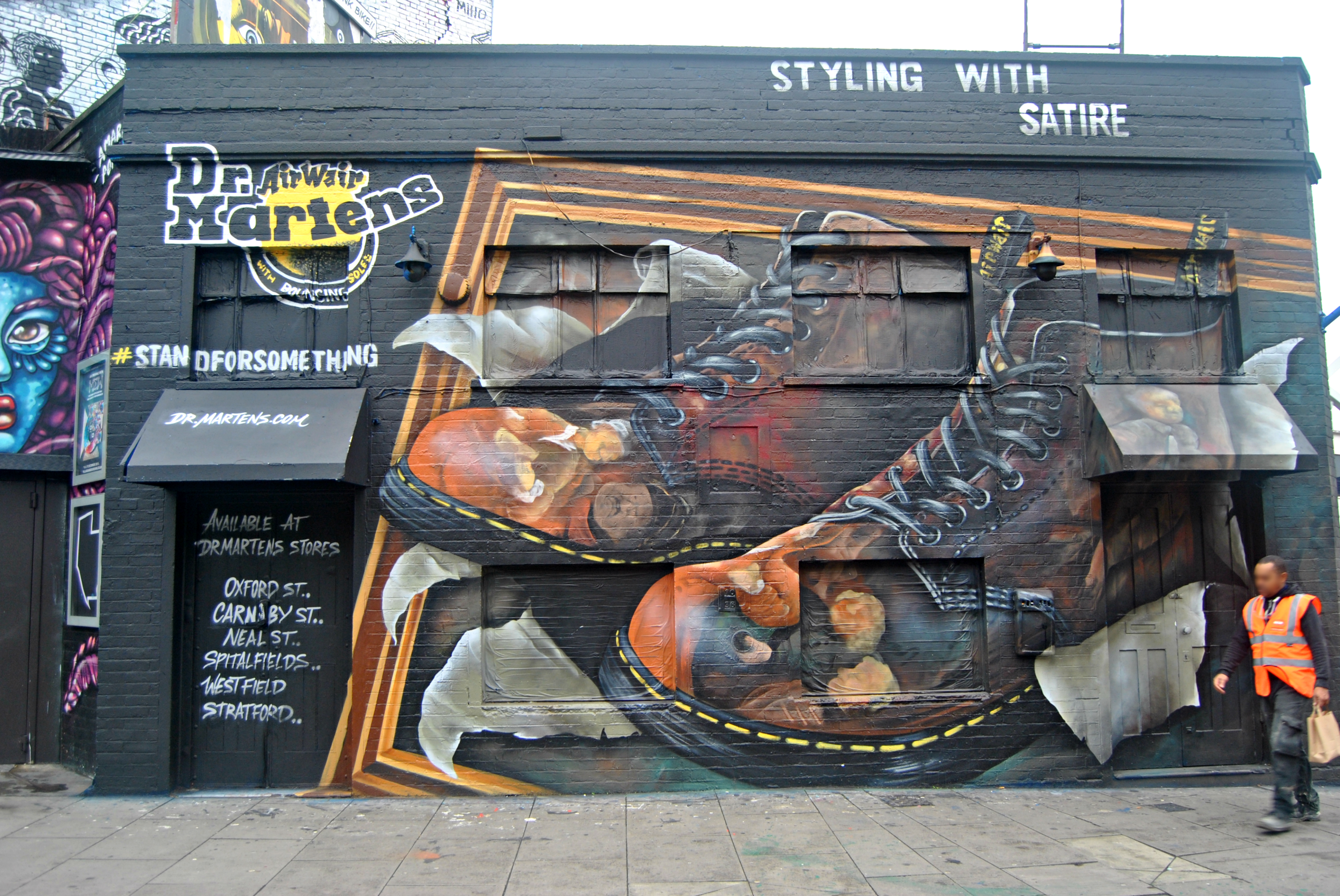
Dr. Martens street art in Shoreditch, London

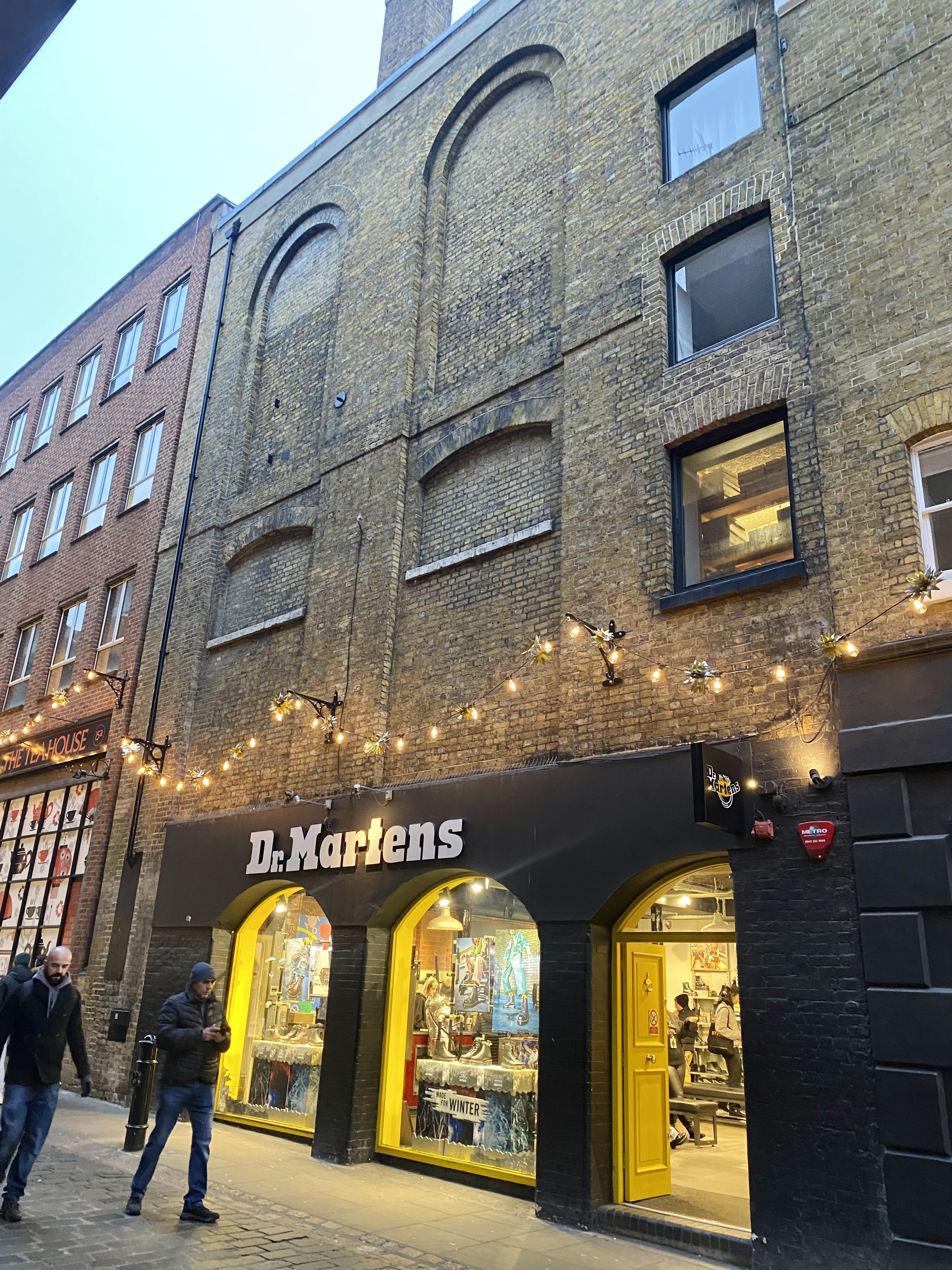
Dr. Martens store in Covent Garden, London

Sales had grown so much by 1952 that they opened a factory in Munich. In 1959, the company had grown large enough that Märtens and Funck looked at marketing the footwear internationally. Almost immediately, British shoe manufacturer R. Griggs Group bought patent rights to manufacture the shoes in the United Kingdom. The R. Griggs Group anglicised the company name to Dr. Martens. The heel was reshaped for a better fit and the trademark yellow stitching was added. The sole was formally trademarked.

The first Dr. Martens boot in the UK with an eight-eyelet, cherry-red-coloured, smooth leather design became known as style 1460 and are still in production today. There are now many variations of this classic design which was introduced on 1 April 1960. The three-eyelet shoe was issued exactly one year later with the style number 1461. The original 1460 and 1461 remain the company's best-selling DMs. The Dr. Martens boots were made in their Cobbs Lane factory in Wollaston, Northamptonshire, where they continued to be made, in addition to production elsewhere, until at least 2018. Jane Schaffer, senior lecturer in footwear and accessories at the University of Northampton, says the classic range has "become iconic".

In addition, a number of shoe manufacturers in the Northamptonshire area and further afield produced the boots under licence, as long as they passed quality standards. The boots were popular among workers such as postmen, police officers and factory workers. By the later 1960s, skinheads started to wear them, "Docs" or "DMs" being the usual naming, and by the late 1970s, they were popular among scooter riders, punks, some new-wave musicians, and members of other youth subcultures. The shoes' popularity among politically right-wing skinheads led to the brand gaining an association with violence. Alexei Sayle sang the song "Dr. Martens' Boots" in a 1982 episode of the BBC's anarchic comedy The Young Ones.

In 1989, the Accent Group became the first manufacturer of Dr. Martens outside the UK, obtaining the rights to make them in Dunedin, New Zealand, which they did for several years. The boots and shoes became popular in the 1990s as grunge fashion arose. In late November 1994, a six-storey Dr. Martens department store was opened in Covent Garden in London, which also sold food, belts, and watches. At this time the R. Griggs company employed 2,700 people, expected to earn annual revenue of £170 million, and could produce up to 10 million pairs of shoes per year.

=== Sponsorship ===
The Dr. Martens company sponsored Rushden & Diamonds F.C. from 1998 to 2005. Diamonds approached owner and local businessman Max Griggs to request sponsorship from his company. A new main stand was built at Nene Park in 2001, named the Airwair Stand. Dr. Martens were also the principal sponsors of Premier League club, West Ham United F.C. from 1998 to 2003, renaming the upgraded west stand 'The Dr Martens Stand'.

=== Trademark disputes ===
In 1999, Dr. Martens fought lawsuits in US courts. The brand filed a number of lawsuits in 2016 based primarily on trademark law.

=== Expansion ===
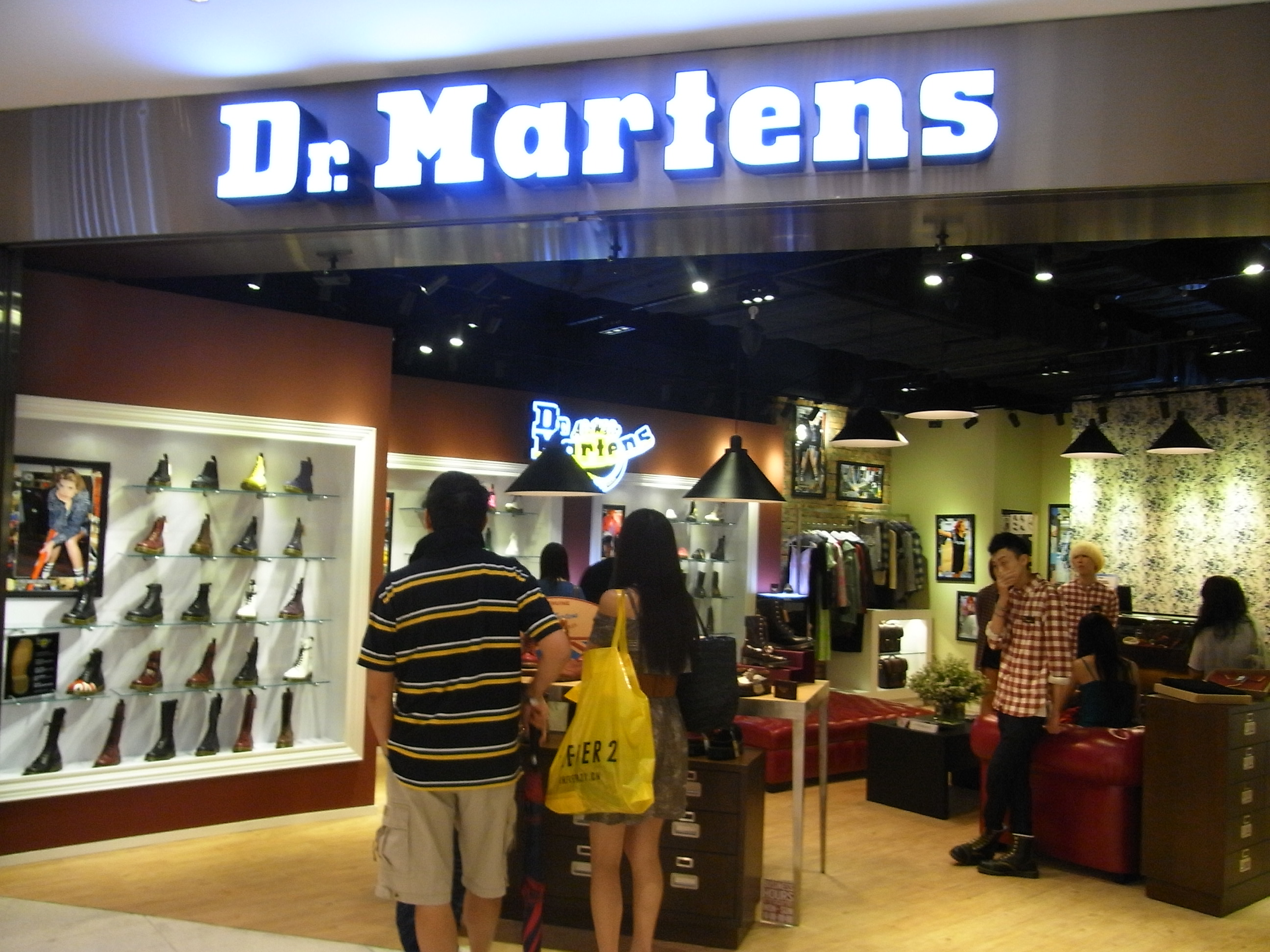
A Dr. Martens retail store in Hong Kong

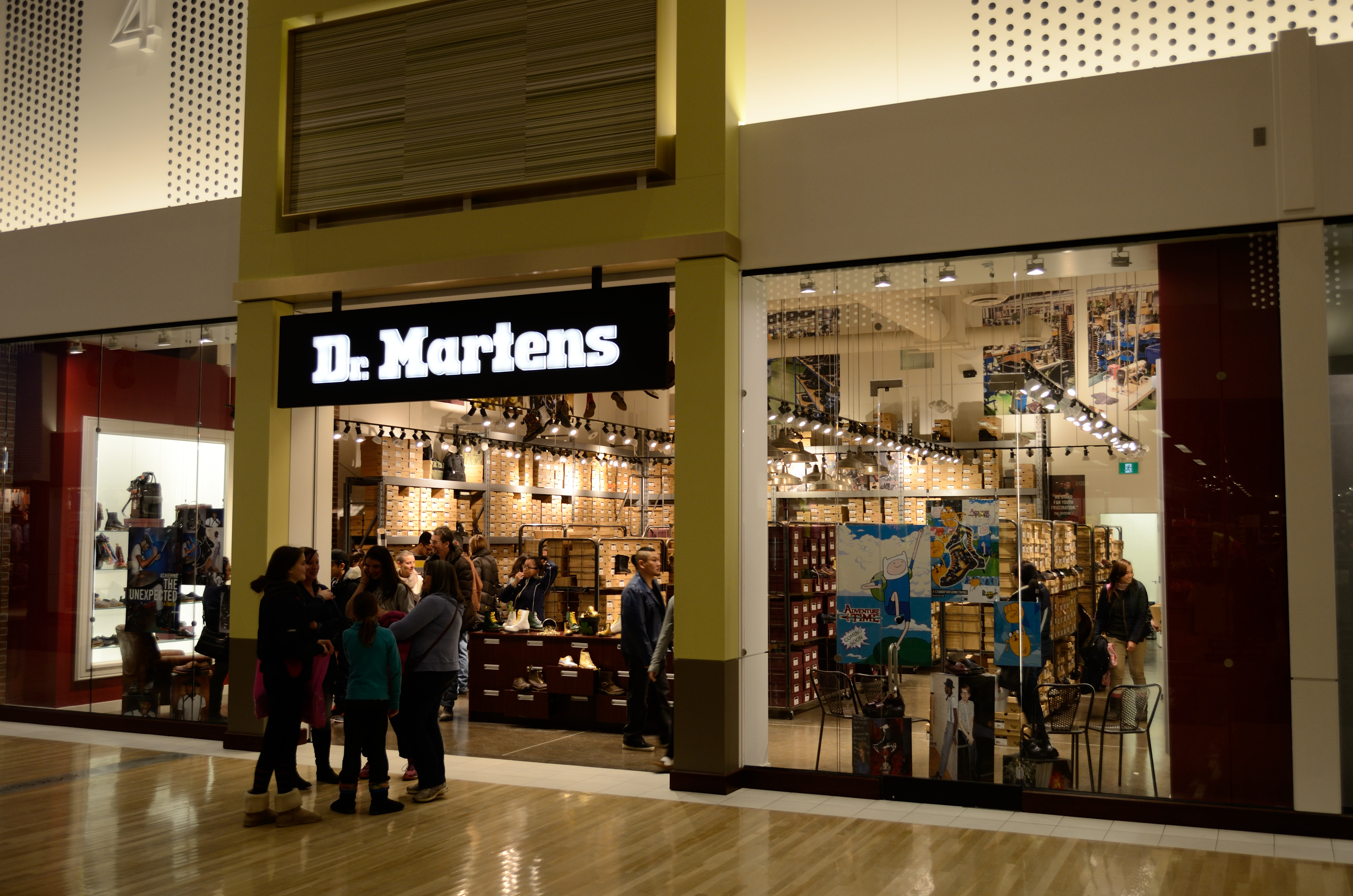
Dr. Martens in Vaughan Mills, Vaughan, Ontario, Canada

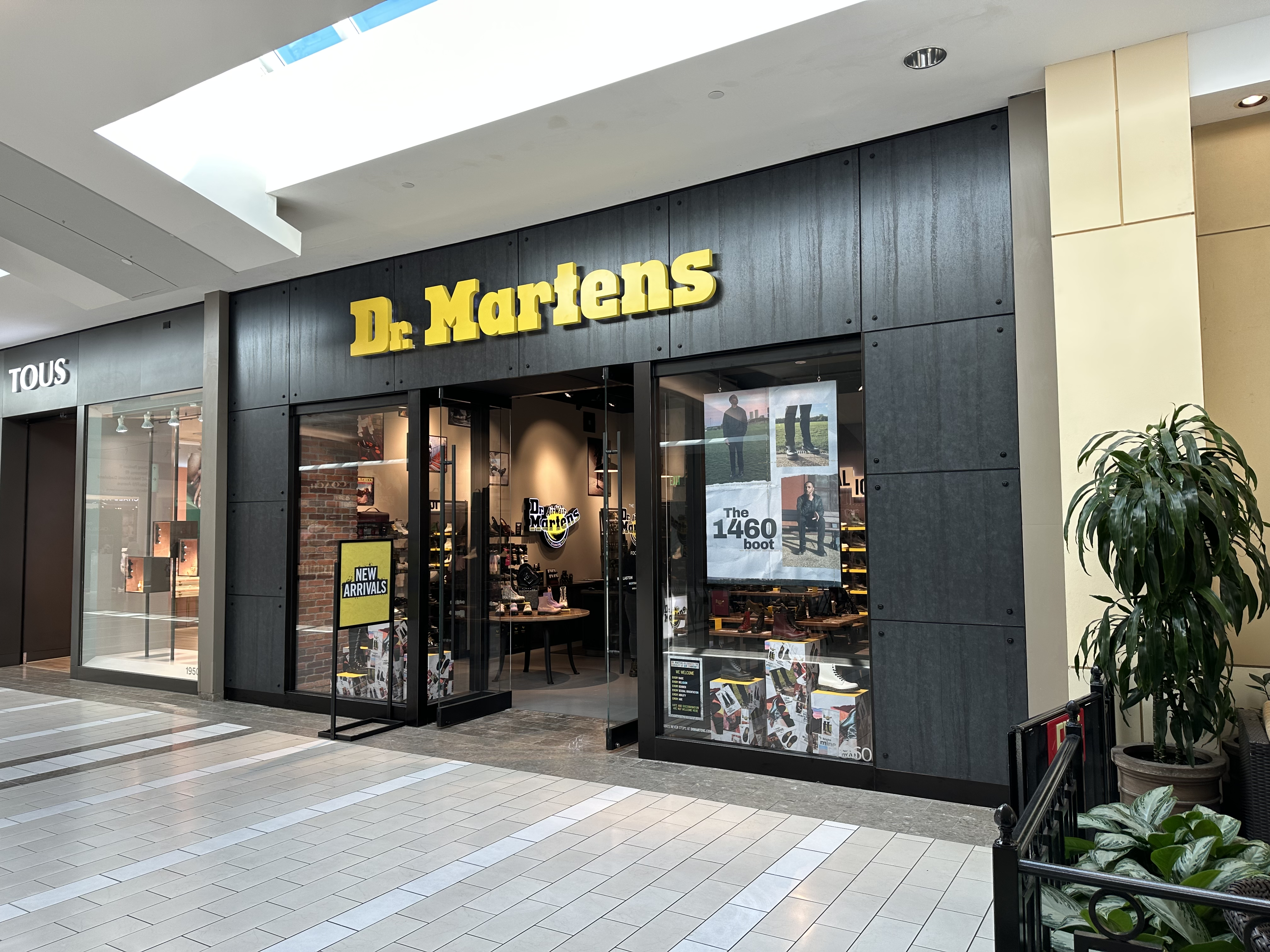
Dr. Martens in Miami, Florida

In the 2000s, Dr. Martens were sold exclusively under the AirWair name in dozens of different styles, including conventional black shoes, sandals and steel-toed boots. AirWair International Ltd revenue fell from $412 million in 1999 to $127 million in 2006. In 2003 the Dr. Martens company came close to bankruptcy. On 1 April that year, under pressure from declining sales, the company ceased making shoes in the UK, and moved all production to China and Thailand. Five factories and two shops were closed in the UK, and more than 1,000 of the firm's employees lost their jobs. Following the closures, the R. Griggs company employed only 20 people in the UK, all in the firm's head office. Five million pairs of Dr. Martens were sold during 2003, half the 1990s level of sales.

In 2004, a new range of Dr. Martens was launched in an attempt to appeal to a wider market, especially young people. The shoes and boots were intended to be more comfortable, and easier to break in, and included some new design elements. Dr. Martens also began producing footwear again at the Cobbs Lane Factory in Wollaston, England in 2004 as part of the "Vintage" line, which the company advertises as being made to the original specifications. Sales of these shoes are low in comparison to those made in Asia, however; in 2010, the factory was producing about 50 pairs per day. In 2005, under turnaround CEO David Suddens the R. Griggs company was given an award by the "Institute for Turnaround" for implementing a successful restructure.

In 2006, the 1460 Dr. Martens AirWair boot was named in the list of British design icons, alongside the Mini.

Worldwide sales of Dr. Martens shoes grew strongly in the early 2010s, and in 2012 it was the eighth-fastest-growing British company. Over 100 million pairs of Dr. Martens shoes were sold from 1960 to 2010, and in 2010 the company offered 250 different models of footwear. The R. Griggs company opened fourteen new Dr. Martens retail stores in the United Kingdom, United States and Hong Kong between 2009 and 2011, and also launched a line of clothing during 2011.

In 2011, the brand introduced a line of vegan boots, made from synthetic polyurethane plastic. Analysts and the company attributed an increase in sales directly to this line. As of 2019, 4% of all shoes sold by the company were vegan.

=== Private equity investment ===
The private equity company Permira acquired R. Griggs Group Limited, the owner of the Dr. Martens brand, for £300 million in October 2013. For a time Dr. Martens footwear was sold under a "for life" scheme, under which it would repair or replace worn-out DM shoes forever for a price somewhat more than twice the normal price for a pair. This offer was available in 2016, but was withdrawn for new sales from May 2018. After Permira purchased Dr. Martens the former brand president of Vans was hired as CEO.

=== Production issues ===
In 2018, ten million pairs of Dr. Martens shoes were produced, only one percent in the UK. Annual revenue in 2019 was £454 million, six times more than in 2013. The most popular model remained the 1460 boots. In 2019 Dr. Martens announced plans to double the production of shoes and boots in the UK, to 165,000 pairs annually in 2020. Dr Martens' design studio is in Camden Town, London.

In 2019, The Guardian reported concerns that the quality of Dr. Martens shoes had declined since either production was moved to Asia or Permira acquired the brand. Many of the newspaper's readers reported that recently produced Dr. Martens products did not last as long as older production. The company responded that there had been no change in the materials used or production processes since manufacturing was moved to Asia, and only 0.5% of its footwear was defective.

In January 2022, the Dr. Martens factory in Wollaston, Northamptonshire featured on the BBC programme Inside the Factory; Series 6, Leather boots.

=== Listing on the London Stock Exchange ===
Dr. Martens was listed on the London Stock Exchange at a value of £3.7 billion in January 2021.

== Subcultural significance ==
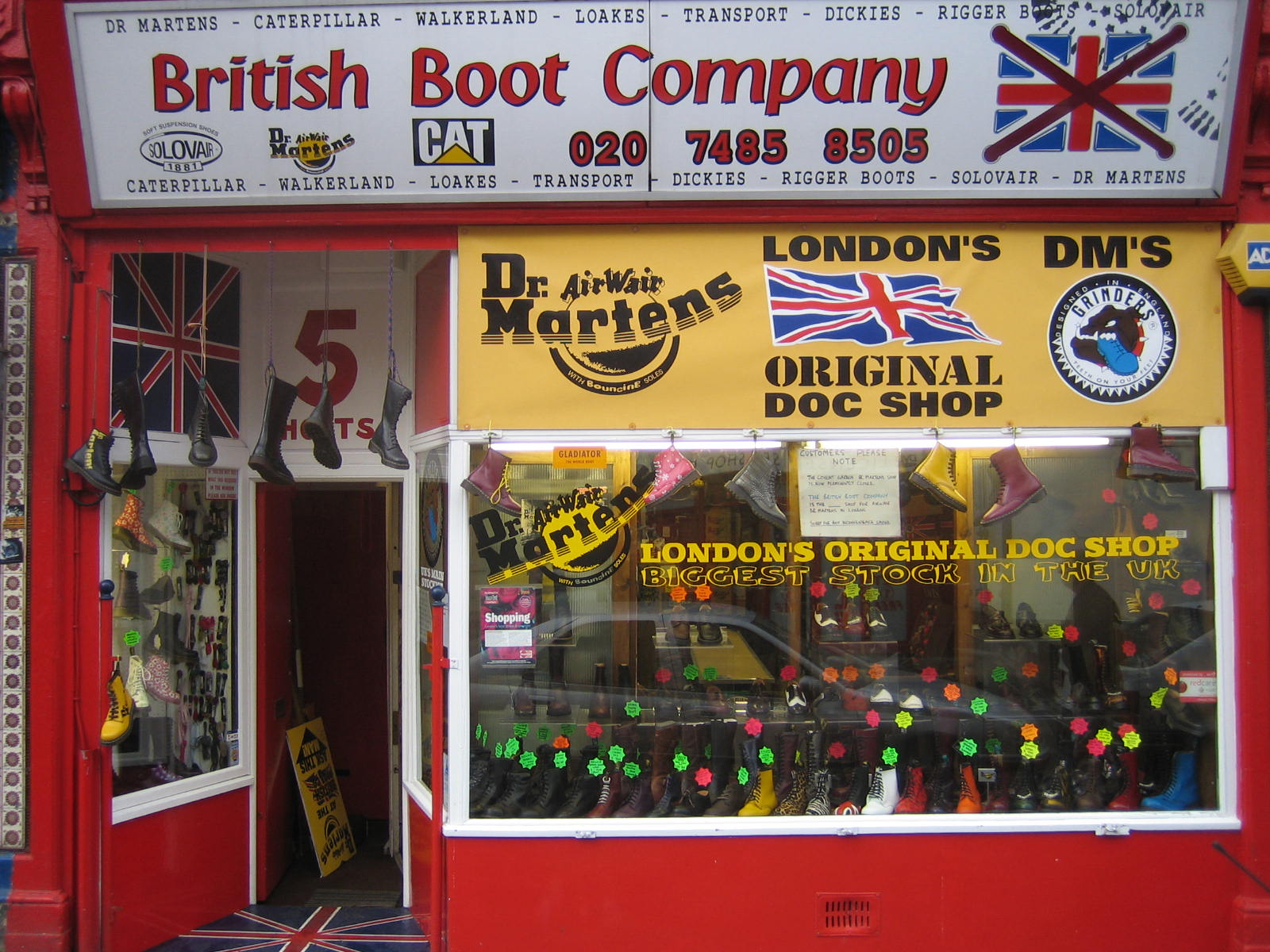
British Boot Company shopfront, advertised as "London's original Doc shop", which Time Out states became a favourite haunt for punk bands like the Sex Pistols in the 1970s

Described by Lauren Cochrane of The Guardian as "fashion's subversive smash hit", Dr. Martens have garnered significant following and ownership within various subcultures since the brand was established in England in 1960, including skinhead, punk, goth, Gen X, LGBT, grunge, Britpop, nu-metal and early emo. Holts shoe shop in Camden Town was the first retailer of DMs in the UK, and on its impact beginning in the 1970s Madness lead singer Suggs writes: "Holts became a mecca for alternative types from around the world. It's still there, as the British Boot Company, serving each new generation of Airware devotees".

According to the BBC, Pete Townshend of the Who "became the first high-profile person to wear [Dr. Martens], as a symbol of his own working-class pride and rebellious attitude". Other notable customers of the brand have included the Sex Pistols, the Clash, the Cure, Madness, Pope John Paul II, Miley Cyrus, Rihanna, Madonna, Spice Girls, Avril Lavigne, Gwen Stefani and the 14th Dalai Lama. Under John Paul II, the Swiss Guard were provided with Dr. Martens boots. In the 1975 British rock musical fantasy film Tommy, Elton John wore 4 ft 6 in (137 cm) DMs. On 30 September 2020, British heavy-metal pioneers Black Sabbath announced a Dr. Martens shoe collection to mark the 50th anniversaries of the band's Black Sabbath (1970) and Paranoid (1970) albums, with the boots depicting artwork from the band's eponymous debut album.

== Gallery ==
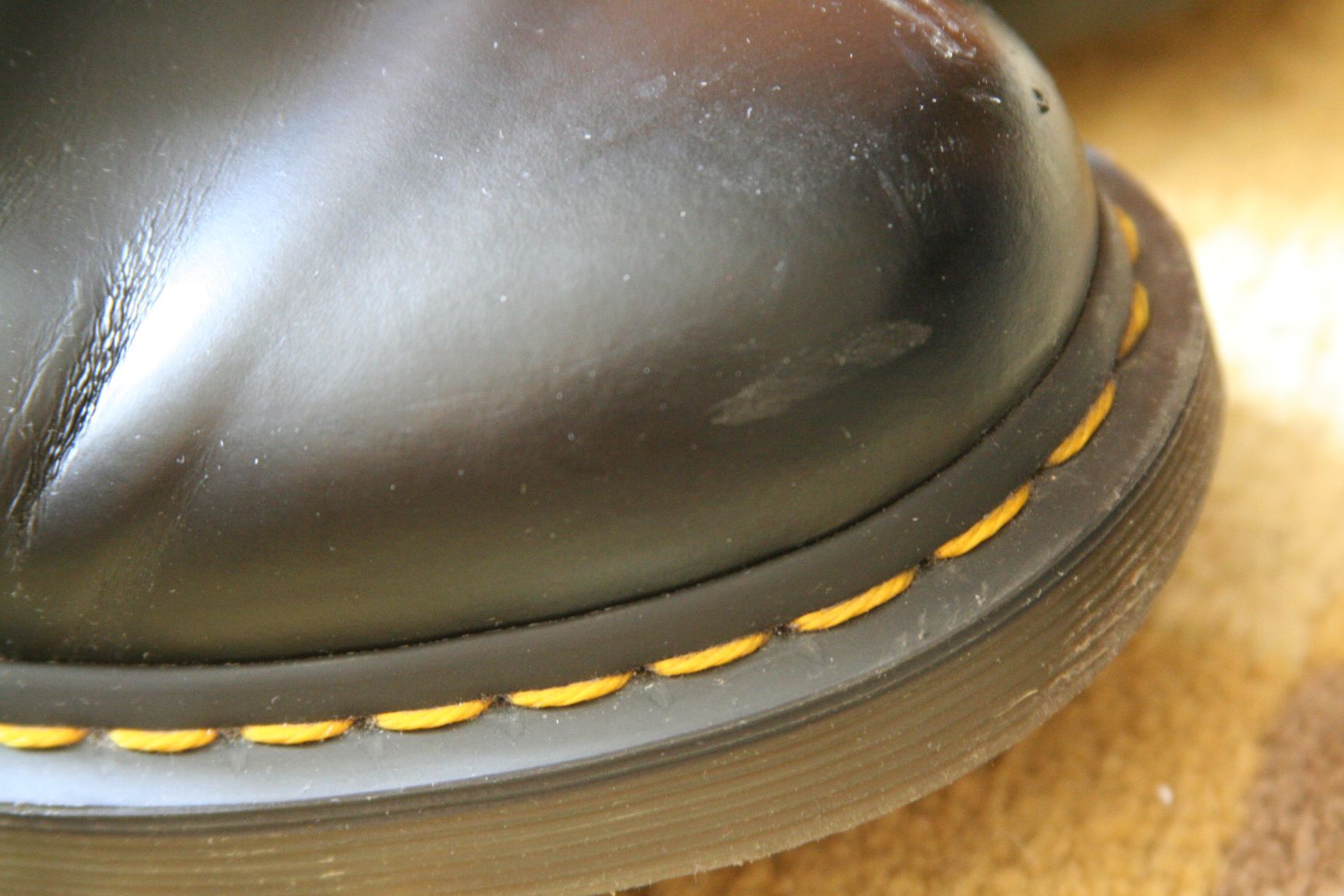
Distinctive yellow stitching on Dr. Martens shoe

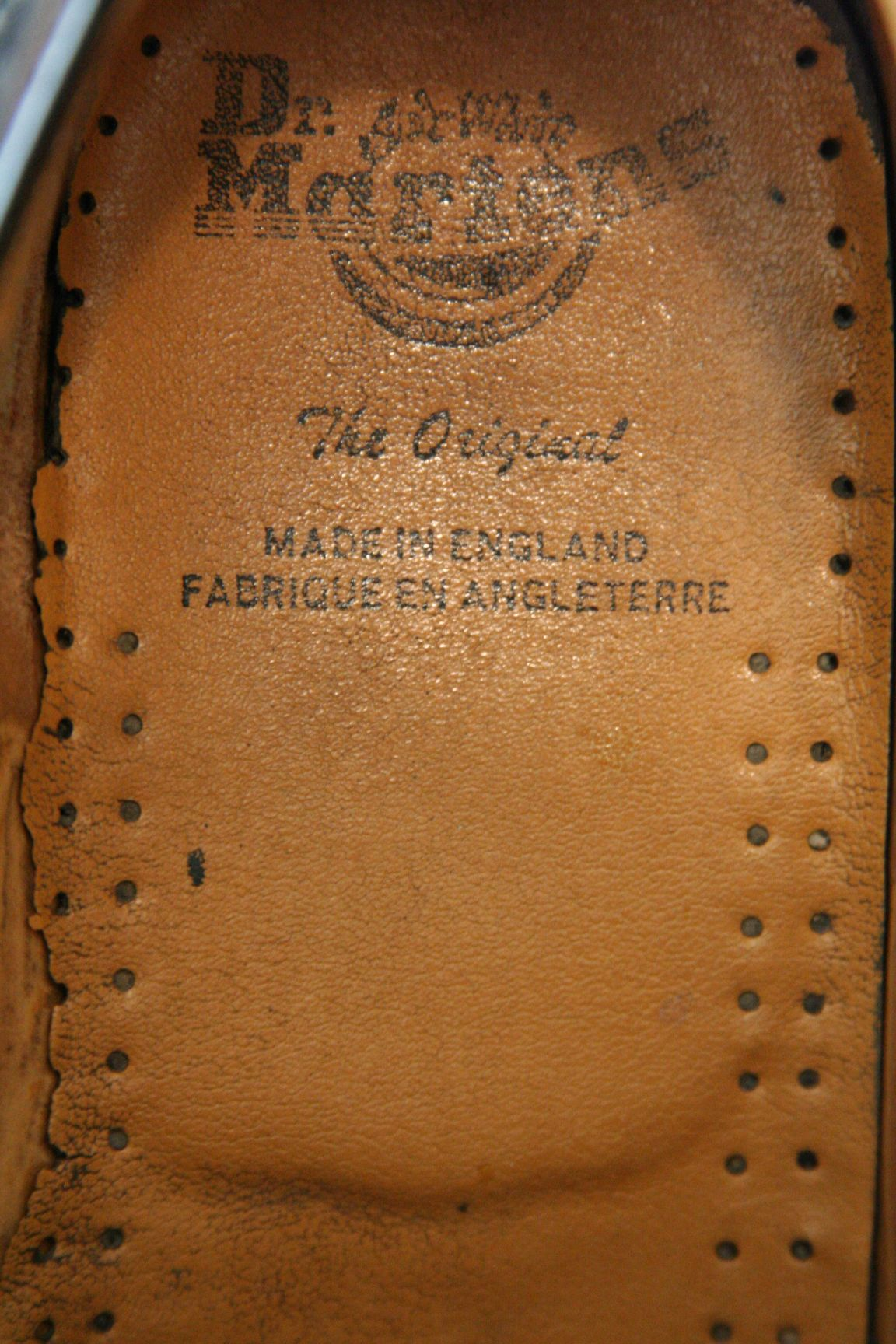
Inside of pre-2003 Dr. Martens made in England

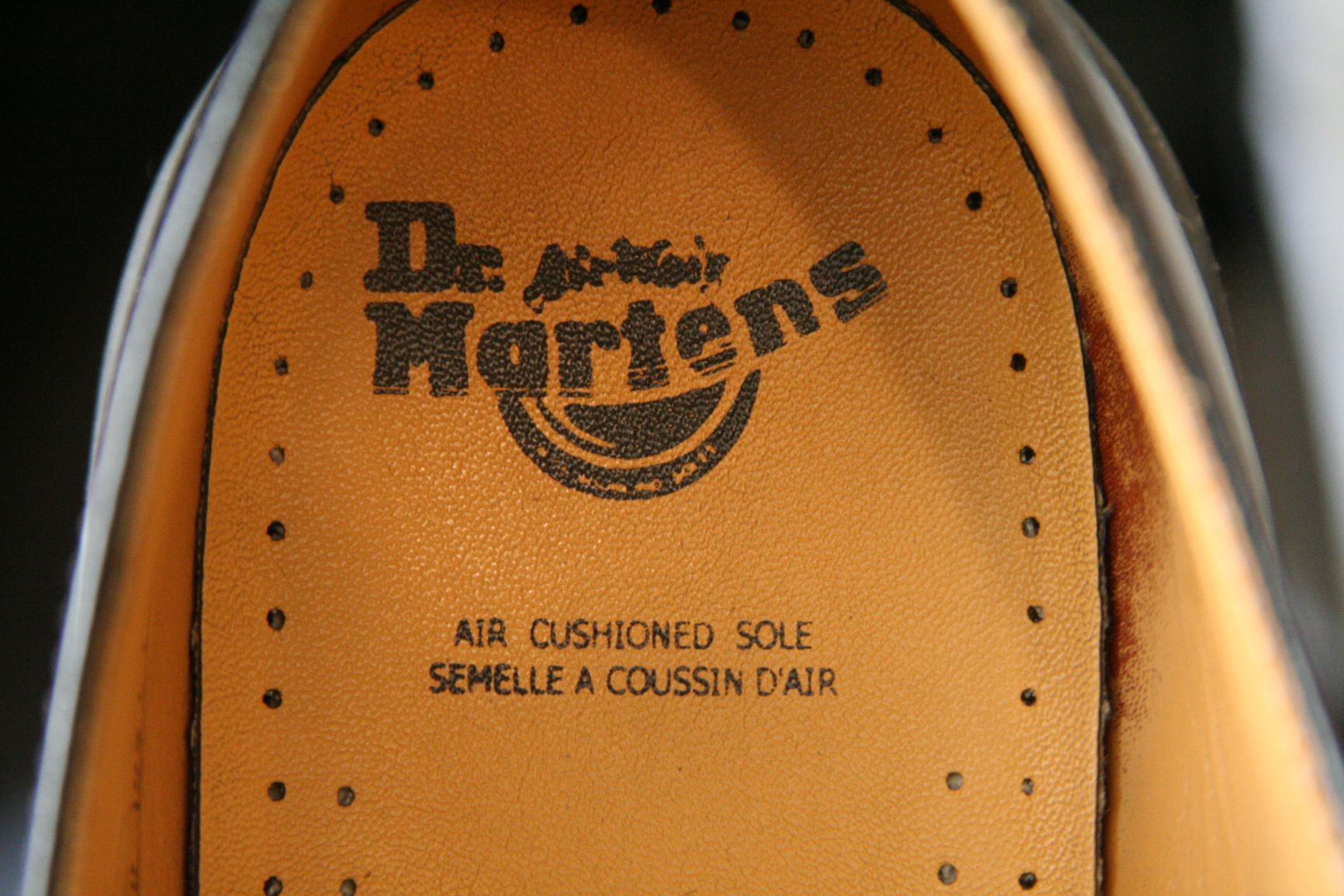
Inside of post-2003 Dr. Martens made in Thailand

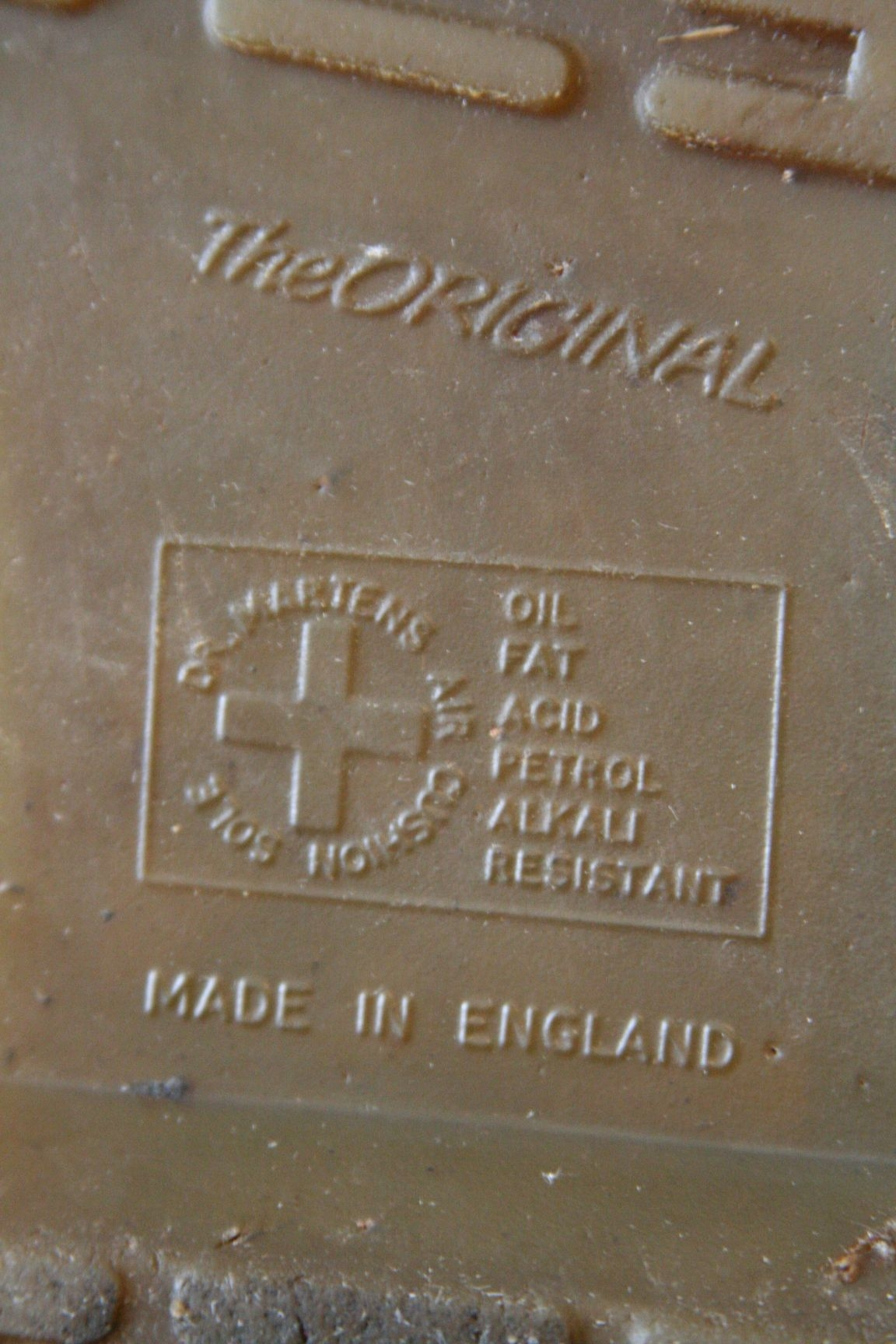
Sole of pre-2003 Dr. Martens made in England

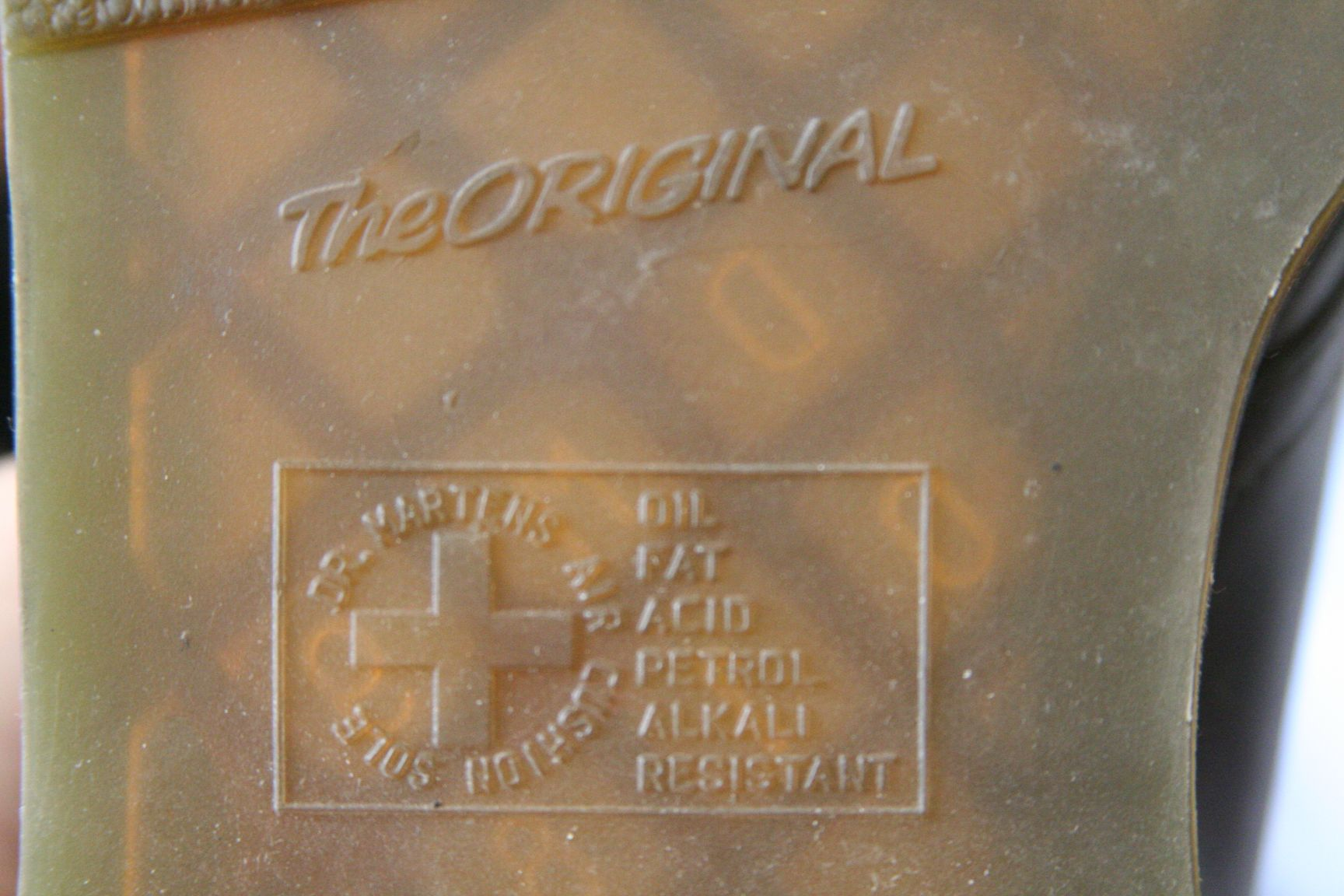
Sole of post-2003 Dr. Martens made in Thailand

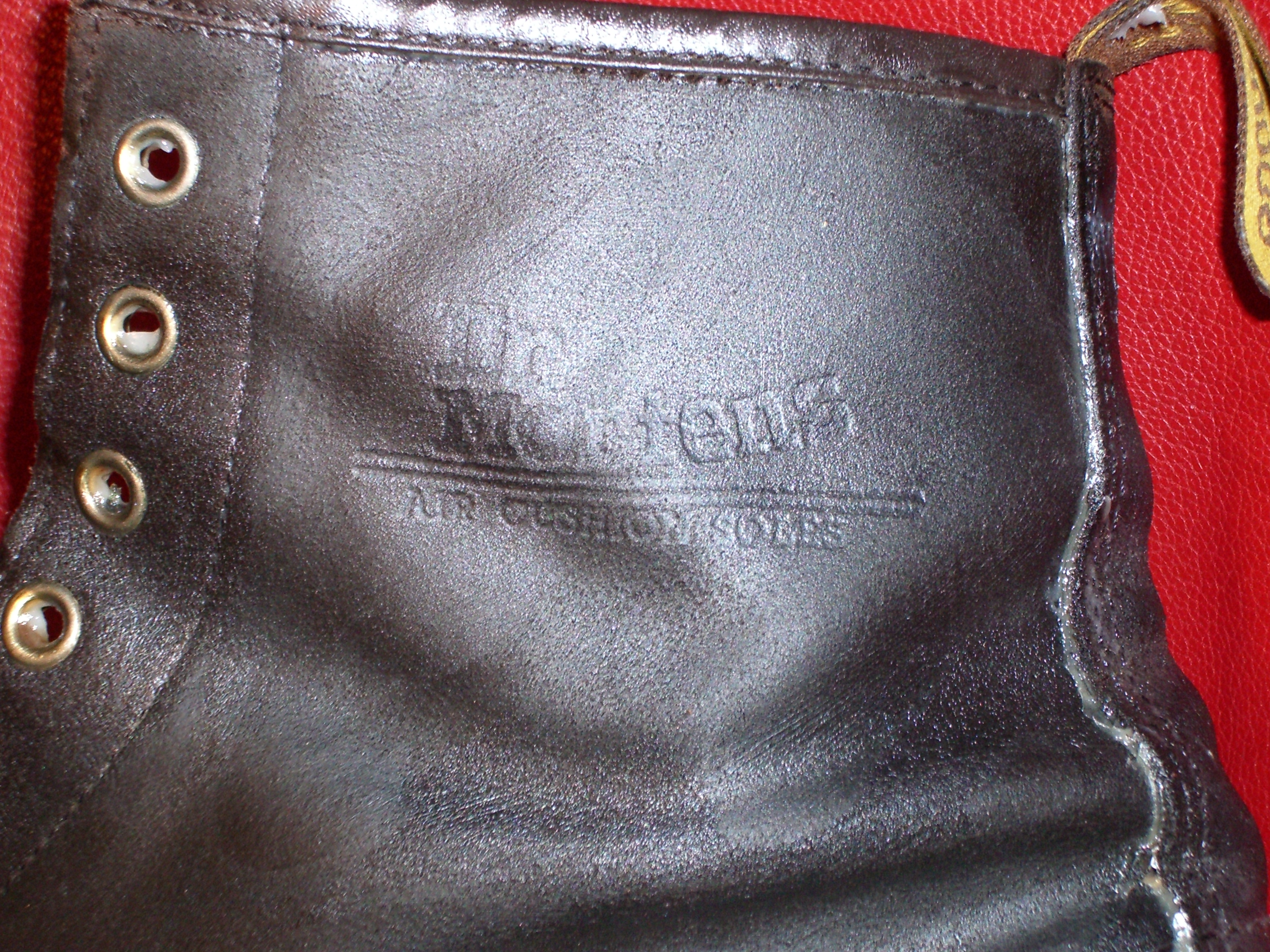
Dr. Martens logo stamped on the outer side of a boot

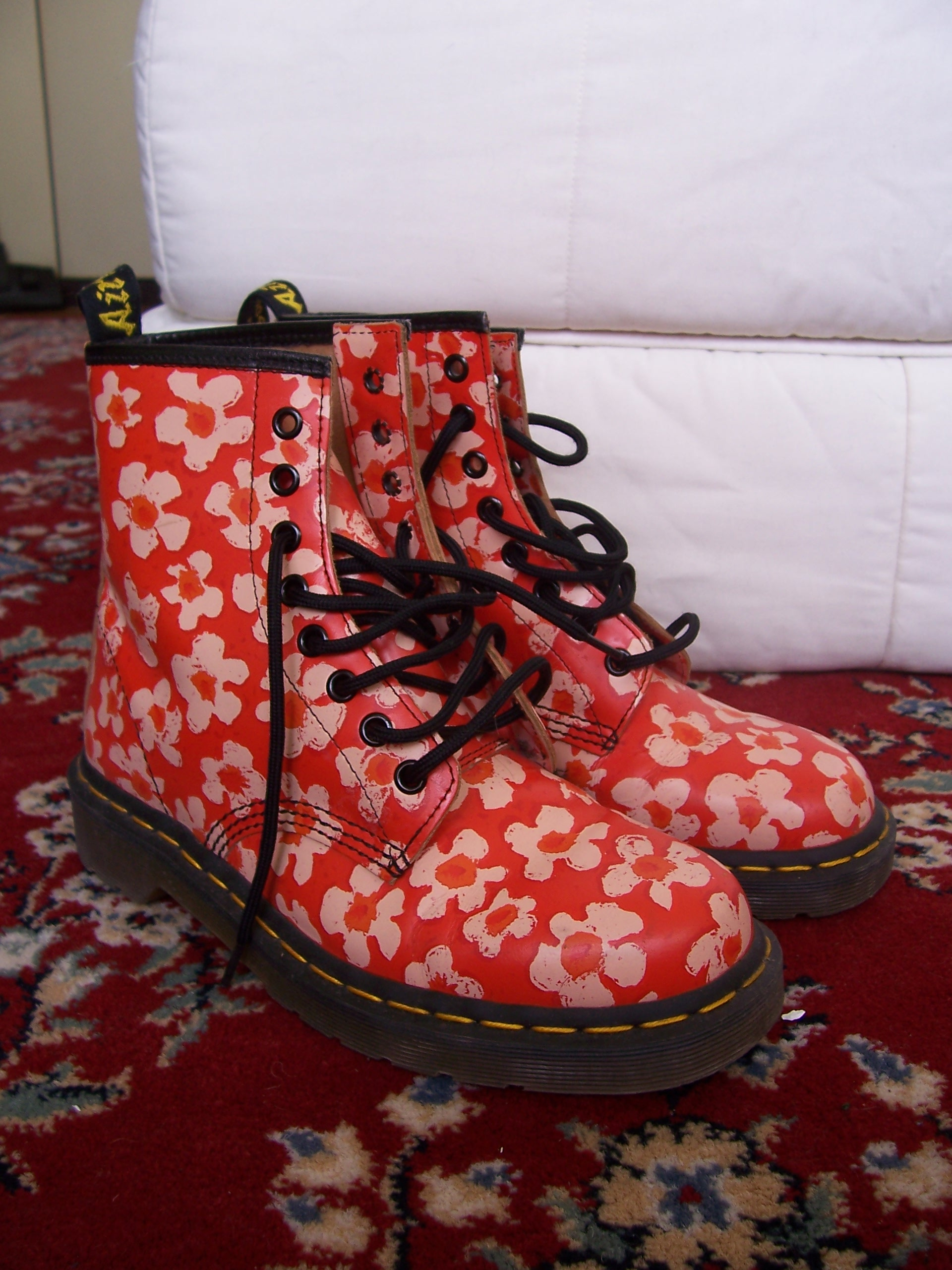
Floral-patterned Dr. Martens boots

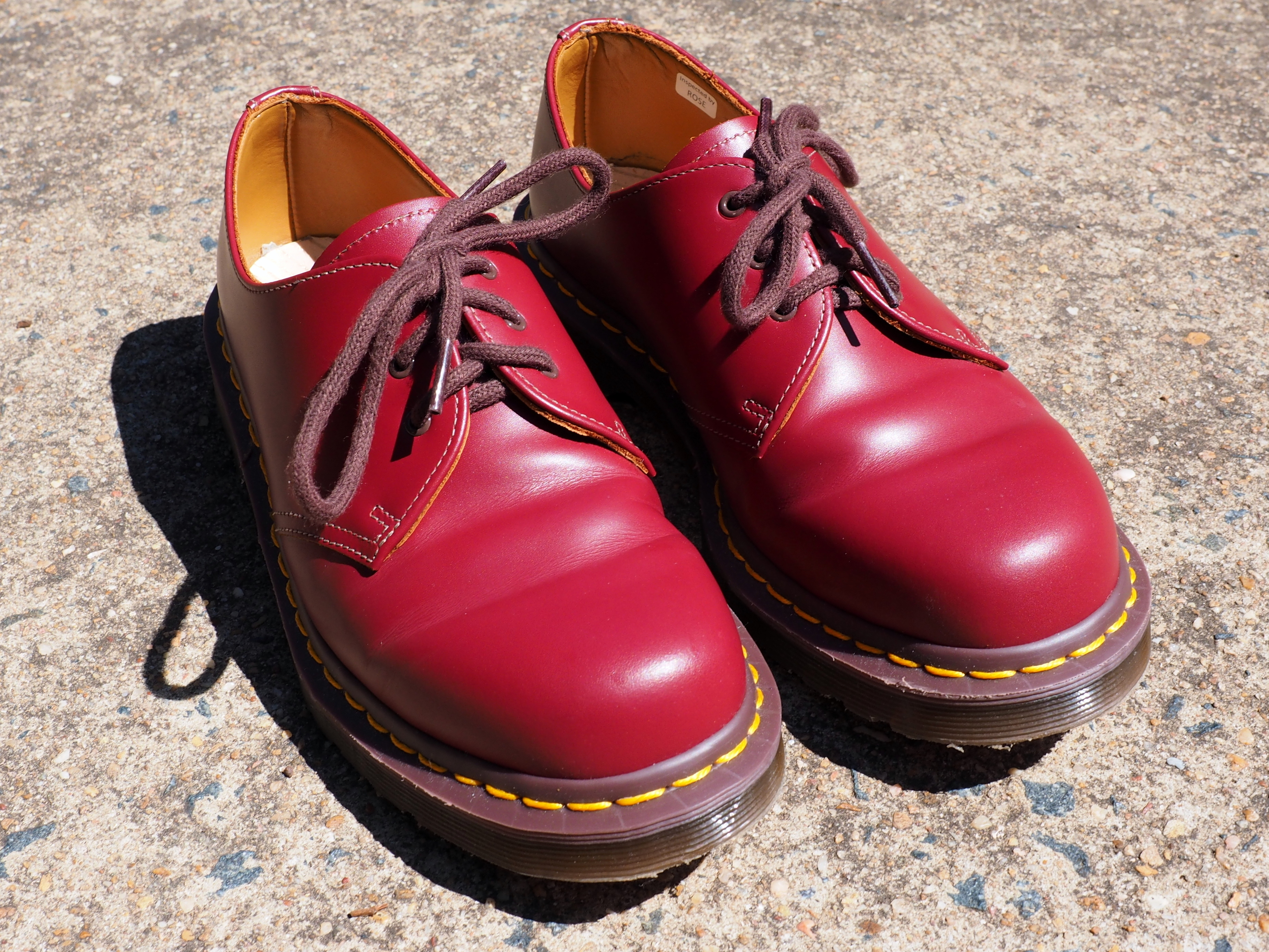
Cherry-red-colour Dr. Martens 1461 shoes

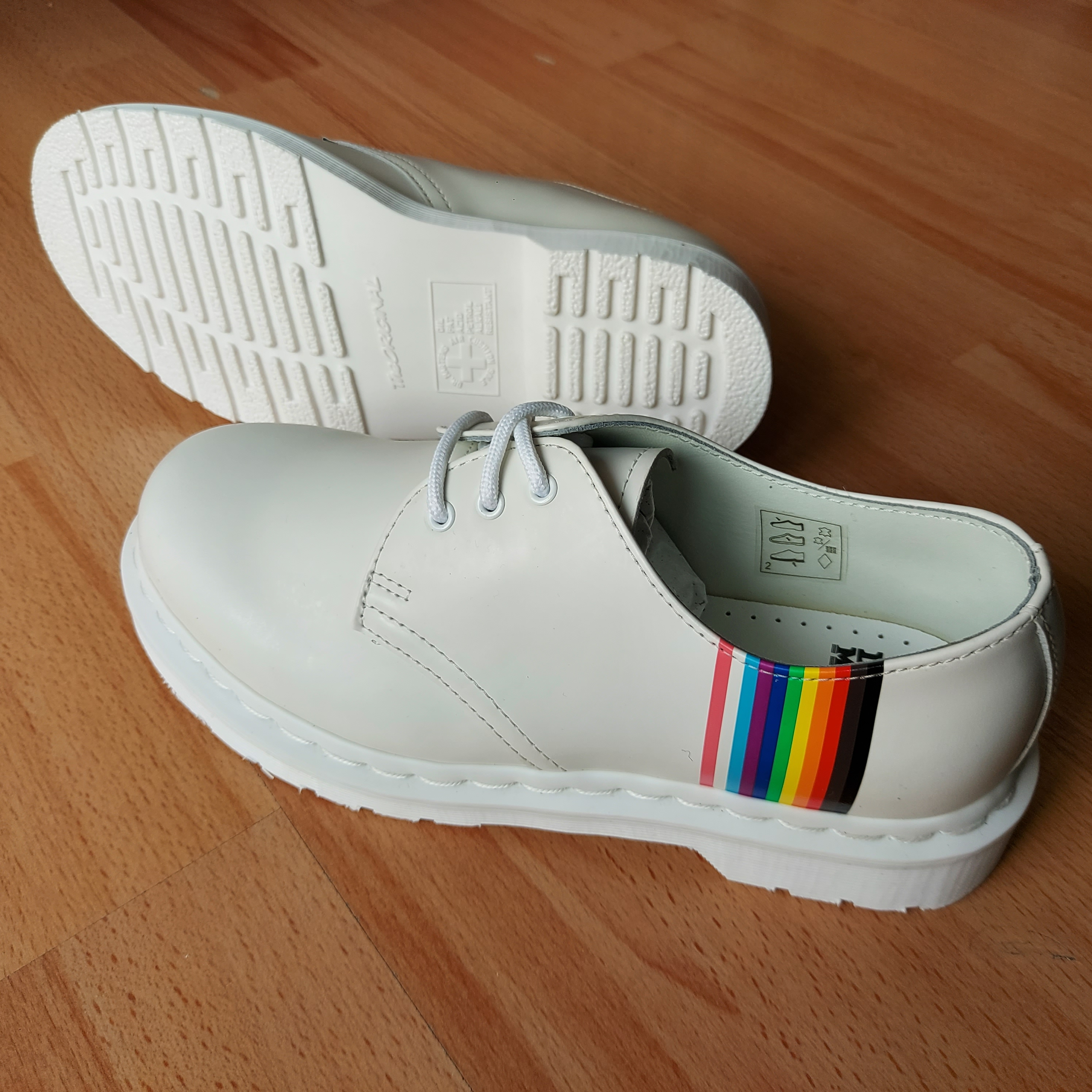
2020 special edition with LGBT pride flag

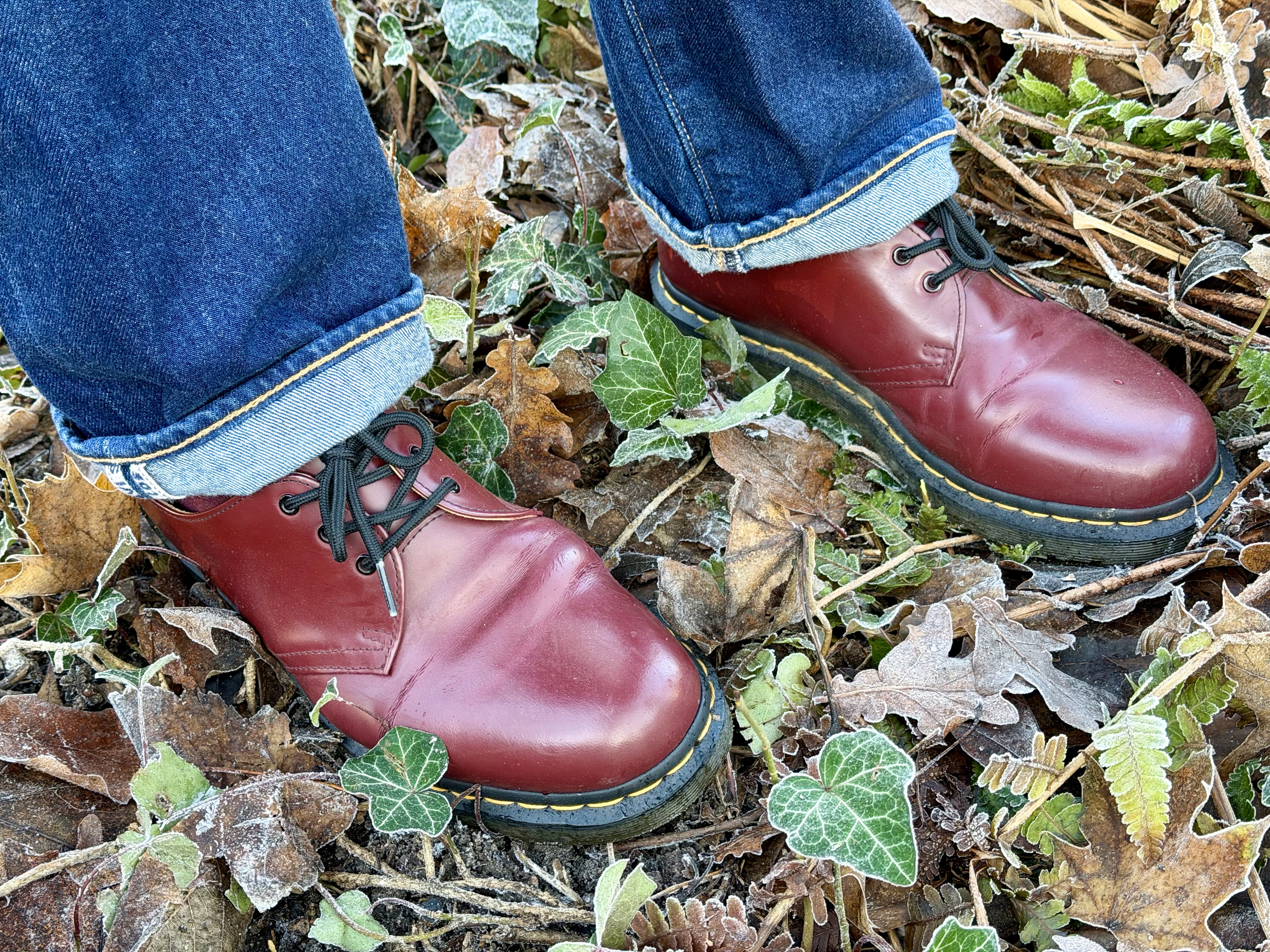
Dr. Martens 1461 oxblood & Levi's 501

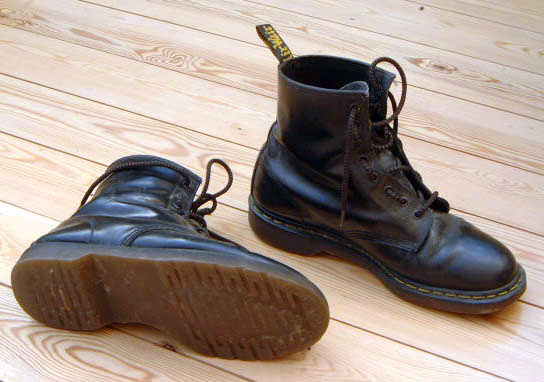
A pair of classic black leather Griggs' Dr. Martens boots, with distinctive yellow stitching around the sole

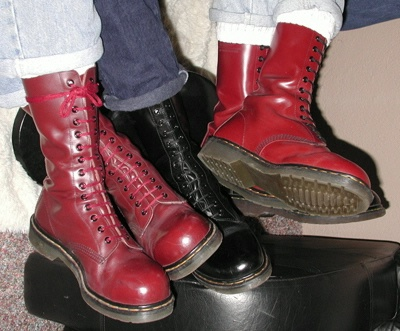
Cherry Red and Black 14-hole Dr. Martens boots

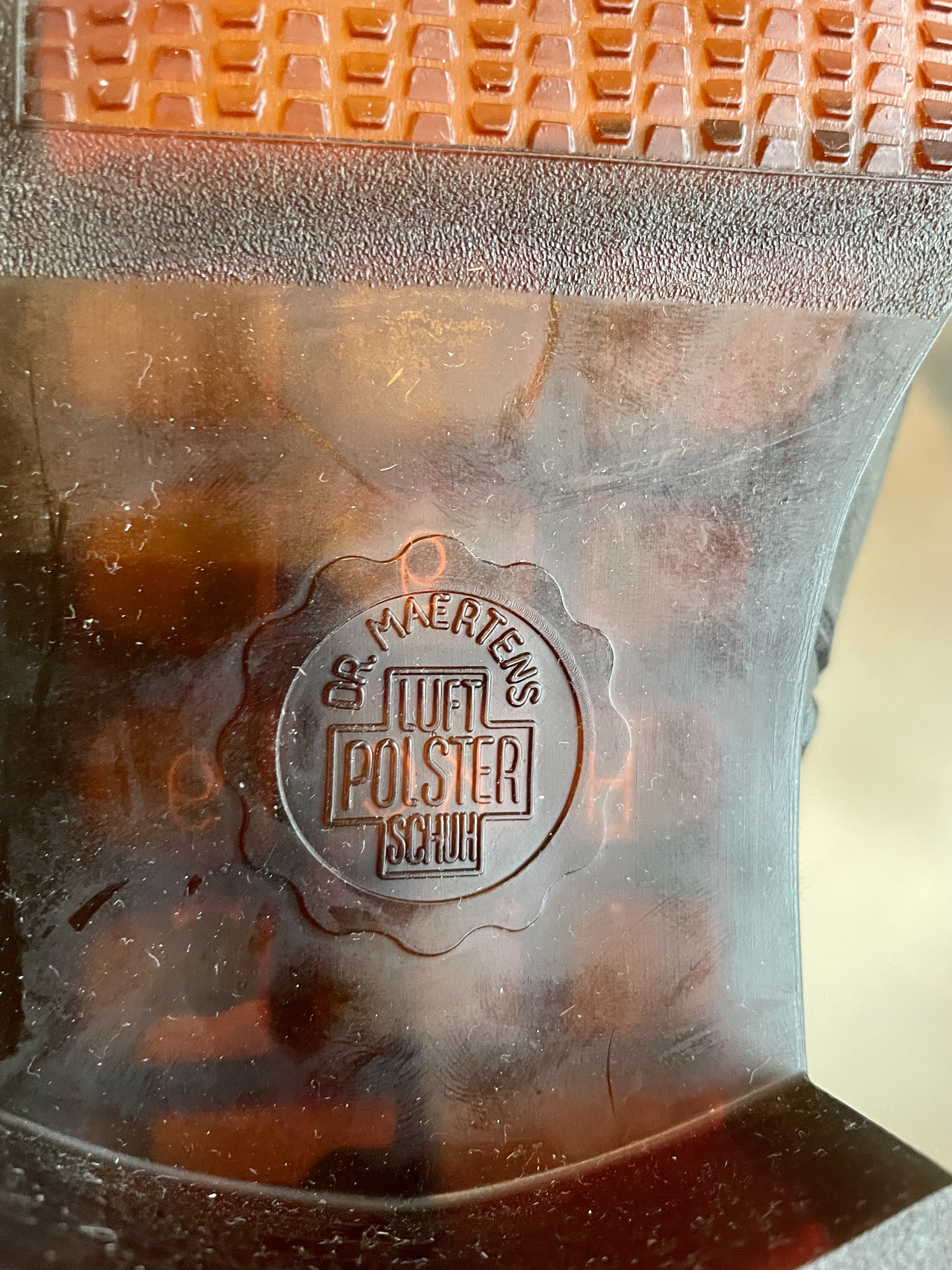
Dr. Maertens logo on a shoe sole from the 1960s, Germany

== See also ==
- Solovair
- Totectors
