= Strixton =

Village in Northamptonshire, England

Coordinates: 52.2442°N 0.6736°W

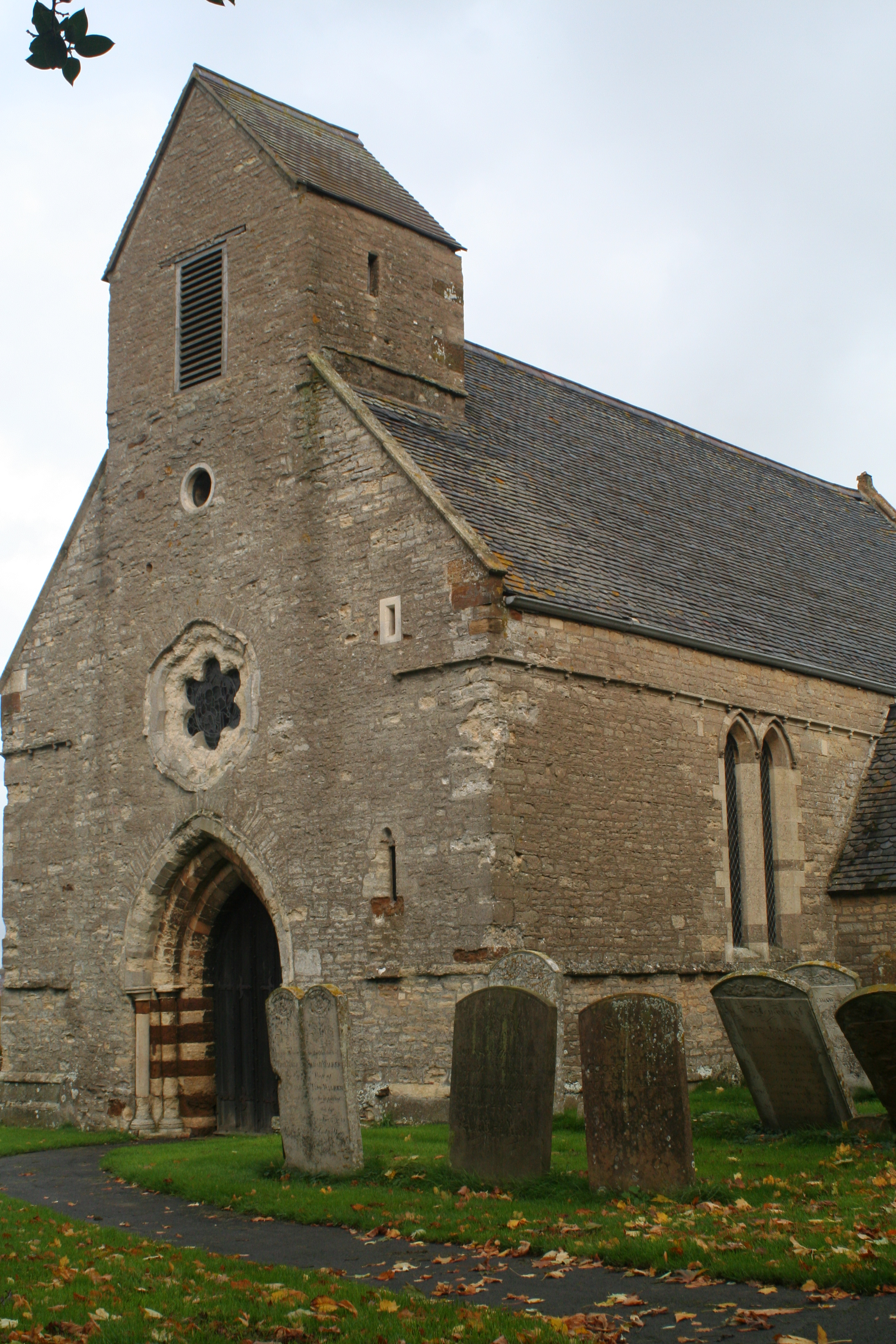
- St Rumwold's Church, Strixton

- Location within Northamptonshire
- Population: 21 (2001)
- OS grid reference: SP905615
- Unitary authority: North Northamptonshire
- Ceremonial county: Northamptonshire
- Region: East Midlands
- Country: England
- Sovereign state: United Kingdom
- Post town: WELLINGBOROUGH
- Postcode district: NN29
- Dialling code: 01933
- Police: Northamptonshire
- Fire: Northamptonshire
- Ambulance: East Midlands
- UK Parliament: Wellingborough

Strixton is a small village in eastern Northamptonshire that borders the main A509 road between Wellingborough and Milton Keynes. The population of the village remained less than 100 at the 2011 Census and is included in the civil Parish of Wollaston.

The village's name means 'Strikr's farm/settlement'. This name might be indistinguishable from the 'Stric' recorded in the Domesday Book as holding land in the adjoining Bozeat and Wollaston parishes during the reign of Edward the Confessor.

The village borders Grendon and Wollaston. The limited amenities include:

- The Church (St Rumwolds).
- A business centre - utilising converted farm buildings.

== The Church ==
St Rumwold was a little-known Saxon Saint who is said to have preached the Gospel after his baptism as an infant; his resting place is recorded as being in Buckingham, but it is thought that there may also be some connection with Romaldkirk in Northern England, which is not properly recorded.

In the 19th century attempts were made to rededicate the church to "John the Baptist" - but this never happened. The church is thirteenth-century and remains now largely as it was built. Inside the church there is a 15th-century screen which is the only late Gothic feature of the church and Nikolaus Pevsner reports that it is "...simple with one light division". The church also owns a Jacobean chalice and paten dating to 1628, which is currently on display at the Victoria and Albert Museum.

According to Pevsner, the church was rebuilt in 1873 with old materials except for the western wall, which has a triple-chamfered doorway and a sexfoil window that has over it a wavy frame. There is a small cusped lancet to the right. In the church the windows are said to be mostly pairs of lancet windows. The communion rail is detailed as being with heavily twisted balusters.
