= Totectors =

British brand of safety footwear and other workwear

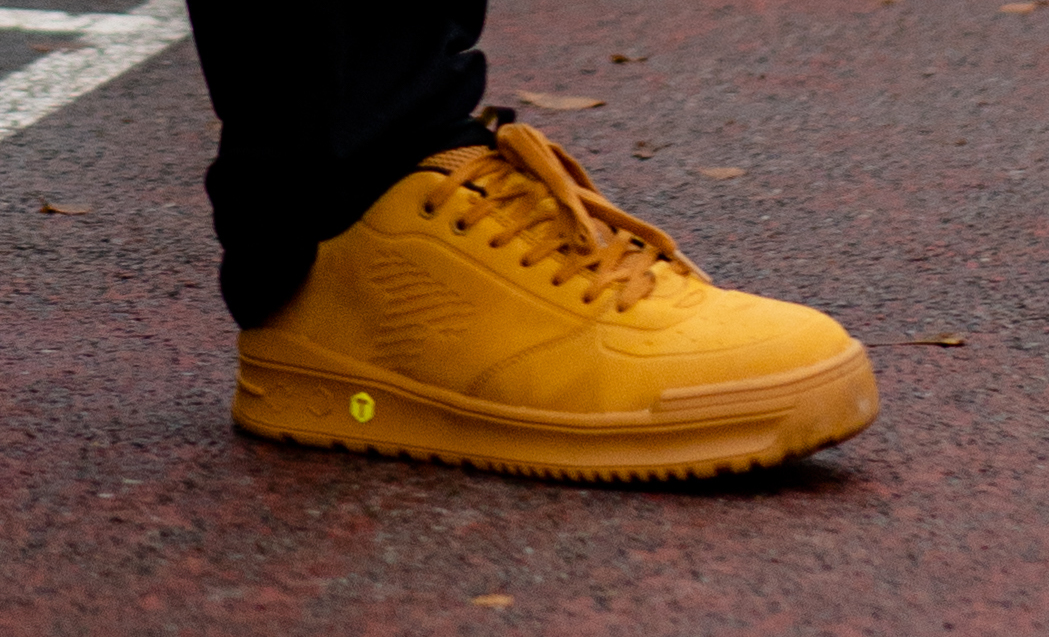

Totectors are a British brand of safety footwear, and, formerly, other workwear, notably steel toe-capped boots and shoes. The name was synonymous with steel capped boots in the late twentieth and early twenty-first centuries, being referred to in that context, for example in Offshore Operations Post Piper Alpha.

== History ==
B. Denton and Son, the original manufacturer, was founded in the nineteenth century, but the steel toecaps were the result of war-work. In World War II, many new recruits to the coal industry were suffering foot injuries. George Denton travelled to the United states in 1944 to secure the rights to the patented steel toecap from Arthur Williams.

By the late twentieth century Totectors were in an "advance state of automation."

In 2005 Totectors became UK distributors of Puma Safety Footwear, with twelve TotectorsPuma styles, six boots and six shoes. All of them had steel toe caps, and ten styles had steel midsoles, anti-static properties and water resistance.

In 2022 Travis Perkins signed a distribution deal with Totectors/IBG.

Totectors are now a brand of International Brands Group, who also own Hi-Tec.
