= Goodyear welt =

Shoe component

The components of a Goodyear welted shoe

A Goodyear welt is a strip of leather, rubber, or plastic that runs along the perimeter of a shoe outsole. The basic principle behind the Goodyear welt machine was invented in 1862 by Auguste Destouy, who designed a machine with a curved needle to stitch turned shoes. The machine was then improved in 1869 and later by Destouy and, more importantly, Daniel Mills, an English mechanic, both employed by Charles Goodyear Jr., the son of Charles Goodyear. It has been noted by historians that Goodyear was a frequent visitor to the shoe factory of William J. Dudley, founder of Johnston & Murphy, where early work on sole stitching equipment was performed.

== Construction ==
"Goodyear construction" involves stitching a welt to the upper and insole of a shoe. The welt is connected to both the upper and insole with thread by means of a raised ridge around the bottom outside edge of the insole, usually reinforced with a canvas-like "rib" (known as "gemming") which is cemented to the back of the ridge. The space enclosed by the welt is then filled with cork or some other filler material such as foam (usually either porous or perforated) or strips of leather, and the outsole is then stitched to the welt.

== Process ==
The Goodyear welt process is a machine-based alternative to the traditional hand-welted method (c. 1500) for the manufacture of footwear, allowing them to be resoled repeatedly.

The upper part of the shoe is shaped over the last and fastened on by sewing a leather, linen or synthetic strip (also known as the "welt") to the inner and upper sole. As well as using a welt, stitching holds the material firmly together.

The welt forms a cavity which is then filled with a cork material. The final part of the shoe is the sole, which is attached to the welt by some combination of stitching and a high strength adhesive like contact cement or hide glue. The result is highly valued for being relatively waterproof by minimizing water penetration into the insole and the relative ease of resoling as long as the upper remains viable. Welted shoes are more expensive to manufacture than those mass-produced by automated machinery with molded soles.
