= Ilford (constituency) =

Parliamentary constituency in the United Kingdom, 1918–1945

- Former borough constituency for the House of Commons

1918–1945
- Seats: one
- Created from: Romford
- Replaced by: Ilford North and Ilford South

Ilford was a borough constituency in what is now the London Borough of Redbridge in eastern Greater London. It returned one Member of Parliament (MP) to the House of Commons of the Parliament of the United Kingdom. It was created for the 1918 general election, and abolished for the 1945 general election, when it was replaced by the new Ilford North and Ilford South constituencies.

== Boundaries ==
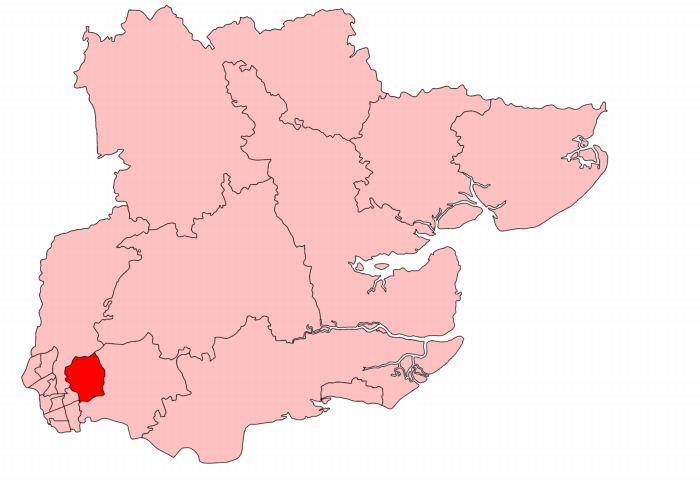
Ilford in Essex 1918-45

== Members of Parliament ==
Year	Member	Party
1918	Peter Griggs	Unionist
1920	Fredric Wise	Unionist
1928	George Hamilton	Unionist
1937	Geoffrey Hutchinson	Conservative
1945	constituency abolished	

== Election results ==
=== Elections in the 1910s ===
General election 1918: Ilford
Party		Candidate	Votes	%	±%
C	Unionist	Peter Griggs	15,870	66.8	
	Labour	Herbert Dunnico	4,621	19.5	
	Liberal	Thomas Hamilton Garside	3,261	13.7	
Majority			11,249	47.3	
Turnout			23,752	58.3	
	Unionist win (new seat)				
C indicates candidate endorsed by the coalition government.

=== Elections in the 1920s ===
1920 Ilford by-election
Party	Candidate	Votes	%	±%
Coalition Unionist	Fredric Wise	15,612	54.4	−12.4
Labour	Joseph King	6,577	22.9	+3.4
Liberal	John Thompson	6,515	22.7	+9.0
Majority		9,035	31.5	−15.8
Turnout		28,704	66.2	+7.9
Coalition Unionist hold		Swing	+4.0	

- endorsed by Coalition Government

General election 1922: Ilford
Party	Candidate	Votes	%	±%
Unionist	Fredric Wise	14,071	44.4	−22.4
Liberal	John Thompson	7,625	24.0	+10.3
Labour	Augustus West	5,414	17.1	−2.4
Ind. Unionist	Frederick C. Bramston	4,610	14.5	New
Majority		6,446	20.4	−26.9
Turnout		31,720	70.5	+12.2
Unionist hold		Swing	-5.6	

General election 1923: Ilford
Party	Candidate	Votes	%	±%
Unionist	Fredric Wise	14,136	44.4	0.0
Liberal	John Morris	11,965	37.5	+13.5
Labour	Dan Chater	5,775	18.1	+1.0
Majority		2,171	6.9	−13.5
Turnout		31,876	64.8	−5.7
Unionist hold		Swing	-6.8	

General election 1924: Ilford
Party	Candidate	Votes	%	±%
Unionist	Fredric Wise	22,825	58.4	+14.0
Labour	Dan Chater	8,460	21.7	+3.6
Liberal	John Morris	7,780	19.9	−17.6
Majority		14,365	36.7	+29.8
Turnout		39,065	74.8	+10.0
Unionist hold		Swing	+5.2	

Comyns Carr

1928 Ilford by-election
Party	Candidate	Votes	%	±%
Unionist	George Hamilton	18,269	44.8	−13.6
Liberal	Arthur Comyns Carr	13,621	33.4	+13.5
Labour	Charles Robin de Gruchy	8,922	21.9	+0.2
Majority		4,648	11.4	−25.3
Turnout		40,812	67.5	−7.3
Unionist hold		Swing	-13.6	

General election 1929: Ilford
Party	Candidate	Votes	%	±%
Unionist	George Hamilton	24,414	42.4	−16.0
Liberal	Arthur Comyns Carr	21,267	36.9	+17.0
Labour	Charles Robin de Gruchy	11,952	20.7	+0.8
Majority		3,147	5.5	−31.2
Turnout		57,633	73.6	−1.2
Unionist hold		Swing	-3.1	

=== Elections in the 1930s ===
General election 1931: Ilford
Party	Candidate	Votes	%	±%
Conservative	George Hamilton	43,737	67.2	+34.8
Labour	Percy Astins	12,173	18.7	−2.0
Liberal	Russell Thomas	9,179	14.1	−22.8
Majority		31,564	48.5	+43.0
Turnout		65,089	71.9	−1.7
Conservative hold		Swing	+18.4	

General election 1935: Ilford
Party	Candidate	Votes	%	±%
Conservative	George Hamilton	43,208	63.1	−4.1
Labour	Percy Astins	25,241	36.9	+18.2
Majority		17,967	26.2	−22.3
Turnout		68,449	64.0	−7.9
Conservative hold		Swing	-11.1	

1937 Ilford by-election
Party	Candidate	Votes	%	±%
Conservative	Geoffrey Hutchinson	25,533	61.2	−1.9
Labour	James Ranger	16,214	38.8	+1.9
Majority		9,319	22.4	−3.8
Turnout		41,747	37.3	−26.7
Conservative hold		Swing	-1.9	

General Election 1939–40

Another General Election was required to take place before the end of 1940. The political parties had been making preparations for an election to take place and by the Autumn of 1939, the following candidates had been selected;

- Conservative: Geoffrey Hutchinson
- Labour: James Ranger
- British Union: Louise Ann King

== In popular culture ==
In Series 3, Episode 6 of the popular BBC mockumentary programme The Thick of It, Senior Advisor to Secretary of State Nicola Murray, Glenn Cullen, tells his co-worker Oliver Reader that he is awaiting the verdict on whether he makes the longlist for potential Labour Party candidates for the fictional Ilford East parliamentary constituency.
