= Ilford South =

Parliamentary constituency in the United Kingdom, 1945 onwards

Coordinates: 51.564°N 0.086°E

- Borough constituency for the House of Commons
- Interactive map of boundaries from 2024
- Location within Greater London
- County: Greater London
- Electorate: 74,065 (March 2020)
- Major settlements: Ilford

Current constituency
- Created: 1945
- Member of Parliament: Jas Athwal (Labour)
- Seats: One
- Created from: Ilford

Ilford South is a constituency (Note: A borough constituency (for the purposes of election expenses and type of returning officer)) created in 1945, and represented in the House of Commons of the UK Parliament since 2024 by Jas Athwal of the Labour Party. (Note: As with all constituencies, the constituency elects one Member of Parliament (MP) by the first past the post system of election at least every five years.)

== Constituency profile ==
Ilford South is a mostly suburban constituency in Greater London, located around 10 miles (16 km) north-east of the centre of London. It covers the southern part of the town of Ilford, including the town centre and the neighbourhoods of Seven Kings, Newbury Park, Little Heath, Marks Gate and parts of Chadwell Heath. The area was traditionally rural but developed rapidly along with much of suburban London during the early 20th century. Today the constituency is suburban in character, interspersed with parks, and is connected to central London by the Elizabeth and Central lines. The constituency has high levels of deprivation, especially in the centre of Ilford. House prices are higher than the national average but considerably lower than the rest of London.

As of the 2021 census, a majority (58%) of Ilford South residents were ethnically Asian, split between large Indian, Pakistani and Bangladeshi communities. White people made up 22% of residents, just under half of whom are of non-British origin; the constituency has a large Romanian population. Black people made up 11% of residents. The constituency is religiously diverse, with considerably higher proportions of Muslims, Hindus and Sikhs than the rest of the country.

Residents of Ilford South are young and have low levels of education and income compared to the rest of London. Few residents work in scientific and professional occupations, and a high proportion work in healthcare and retail. At the local borough council, all seats within the constituency are represented by Labour Party councillors. An estimated 52% of voters in Ilford South supported remaining in the European Union in the 2016 referendum, higher than the nationwide figure of 48% but lower than the rest of London.

== Political history ==
This constituency was created in 1945. The previous MP since 1992, Mike Gapes, who before defecting to Change UK, was the fourth Labour Party MP, each of whose tenures was interspersed or preceded by one of a Conservative MP serving the area. Regarded as a key marginal seat for decades, under Gapes's tenure Ilford South became a very safe seat for the Labour Party; in every election since 1997 it has been won by a majority of over 20% by Labour, and in 2017 they secured over 75% of the vote in the constituency.

The 2015 result made the seat the 38th safest of Labour's 232 seats by percentage of majority. The narrowest result since 1997 (inclusive) was in 2005 at a majority of 21.6%; the 2017 majority is the greatest ever achieved in the seat, at 54.9%.

== Boundaries ==
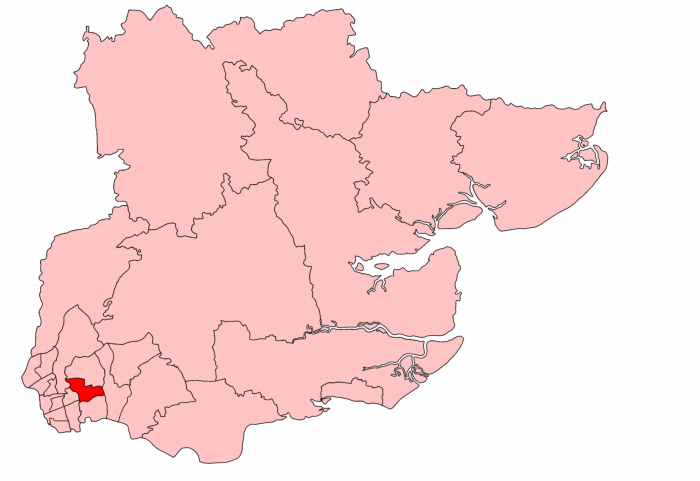
Ilford South in Essex, showing boundaries used from 1945 to 1950

Map of boundaries 2010–2024

=== Historic ===
1945–1950: The Borough of Ilford wards of Clementswood, Cranbrook, Goodmayes, Loxford, and Park.

1950–1974: The Borough of Ilford wards of Clementswood, Cranbrook, Goodmayes, Loxford, Mayfield, and Park.

1974–1983: The London Borough of Redbridge wards of Clementswood, Cranbrook, Goodmayes, Ilford, Mayfield, and Park.

1983–1997: As above substituting Ilford and Park with reshaped wards Loxford, Newbury, and Valentines.

1997–2017: As above plus Chadwell and Seven Kings wards.

2017–2024: Following a review of ward boundaries which did not effect the parliamentary boundaries, from May 2017 the constituency comprised the following wards:

- Chadwell, Clementswood, Cranbrook, Goodmayes, Ilford Town, Loxford, Mayfield, Newbury, Seven Kings, Valentines, and a small part of Wanstead Park ward.

=== Current ===
Further to the 2023 review of Westminster constituencies, which came into effect for the 2024 general election, the constituency is composed of:

- The London Borough of Barking and Dagenham ward of Chadwell Heath; and
- The London Borough of Redbridge wards of Chadwell, Clementswood, Goodmayes, Ilford Town, Loxford, Mayfield, Newbury, and Seven Kings.

The Cranbrook and Valentines wards were transferred to Ilford North, with the small part of Wanstead Park ward going to Leyton and Wanstead. To partly compensate, the Chadwell Heath ward was transferred from Dagenham and Rainham.

== Members of Parliament ==
Election	Member	Party
1945	Jim Ranger	Labour
1950	Albert Cooper	Conservative
1966	Arnold Shaw	Labour
1970	Albert Cooper	Conservative
February 1974	Arnold Shaw	Labour
1979	Neil Thorne	Conservative
1992	Mike Gapes	Labour
February 2019	Mike Gapes	The Independent Group for Change
2019	Sam Tarry	Labour
2024	Jas Athwal	Labour

== Election results ==
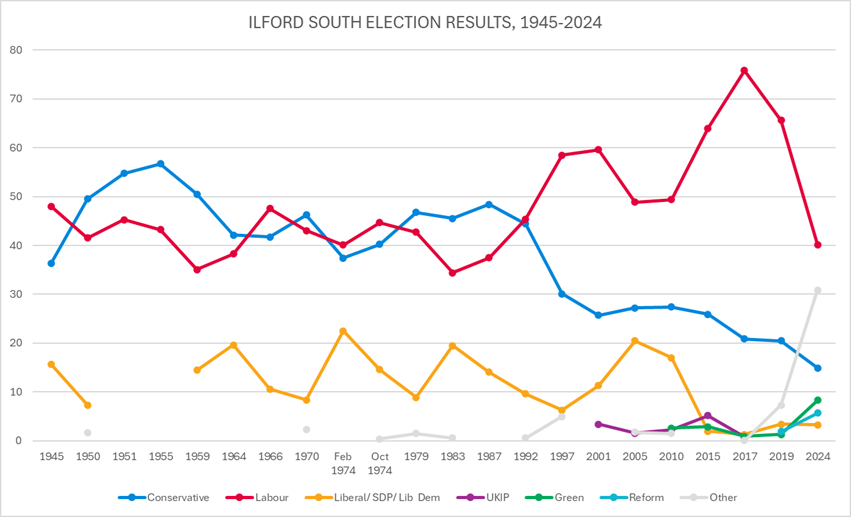
Election results 1945-2024

=== Elections in the 2020s ===
General election 2024: Ilford South
Party	Candidate	Votes	%	±%
Labour	Jas Athwal	16,537	40.2	–25.4
Independent	Noor Begum	9,643	23.4	N/A
Conservative	Sayeed Syduzzaman	6,142	14.9	–5.6
Green	Syed Siddiqi	3,437	8.3	+7.0
Reform	Raj Forhad	2,329	5.7	+3.8
Workers Party	Golam Tipu	1,366	3.3	N/A
Liberal Democrats	Richard Clare	1,340	3.3	–0.1
TUSC	Andy Walker	376	0.9	N/A
Majority		6,896	16.8	–27.2
Turnout		41,170	50.8	–11.8
Registered electors		80,993		
Labour hold				

=== Elections in the 2010s ===
2019 notional result
Party	Vote	%
Labour	30,246	65.2
Conservative	9,837	21.2
Others	3,082	6.6
Liberal Democrats	1,546	3.3
Brexit Party	1,034	2.2
Green	623	1.3
Turnout	46,368	62.6
Electorate	74,065	

General election 2019: Ilford South
Party	Candidate	Votes	%	±%
Labour	Sam Tarry	35,085	65.6	–10.2
Conservative	Ali Azeem	10,984	20.5	–0.4
The Independent Group for Change	Mike Gapes	3,891	7.3	N/A
Liberal Democrats	Ashburn Holder	1,795	3.4	+2.1
Brexit Party	Munish Sharma	1,008	1.9	N/A
Green	Rosemary Warrington	714	1.3	+0.4
Majority		24,101	45.1	–9.8
Turnout		53,477	62.9	–7.0
Labour hold		Swing	–4.9	

General election 2017: Ilford South
Party	Candidate	Votes	%	±%
Labour Co-op	Mike Gapes	43,724	75.8	+11.8
Conservative	Christopher Chapman	12,077	20.9	–5.0
Liberal Democrats	Farid Ahmed	772	1.3	–0.7
Green	Rosemary Warrington	542	0.9	–2.0
UKIP	Tariq Saeed	477	0.8	–4.4
Friends Party	Kane Khan	65	0.1	N/A
Majority		31,647	54.9	+16.8
Turnout		57,657	69.9	+13.5
Registered electors		82,487		
Labour Co-op hold		Swing	+8.4	

General election 2015: Ilford South
Party	Candidate	Votes	%	±%
Labour Co-op	Mike Gapes	33,232	64.0	+14.6
Conservative	Christopher Chapman	13,455	25.9	−1.5
UKIP	Amjad Khan	2,705	5.2	+3.0
Green	Rosemary Warrington	1,506	2.9	+0.3
Liberal Democrats	Ashburn Holder	1,014	2.0	−15.0
Majority		19,777	38.1	+16.1
Turnout		51,912	56.4	−1.6
Registered electors		91,987		
Labour Co-op hold		Swing	+8.1	

General election 2010: Ilford South
Party	Candidate	Votes	%	±%
Labour Co-op	Mike Gapes	25,311	49.4	+0.5
Conservative	Toby Boutle	14,014	27.4	+0.2
Liberal Democrats	Anood Al-Samerai	8,679	17.0	−3.5
Green	Wilson Chowdhry	1,319	2.6	N/A
UKIP	Terry Murray	1,132	2.2	+0.6
Save King George Hospital	John Jestico	746	1.5	N/A
Majority		11,297	22.0	+0.3
Turnout		51,201	58.0	+4.4
Registered electors		86,220		
Labour Co-op hold		Swing	+0.2	

=== Elections in the 2000s ===
General election 2005: Ilford South
Party	Candidate	Votes	%	±%
Labour Co-op	Mike Gapes	20,856	48.9	−10.7
Conservative	Stephen Metcalfe	11,628	27.2	+1.5
Liberal Democrats	Matthew E. Lake	8,761	20.5	+9.2
British Public Party	Kashif Rana	763	1.8	N/A
UKIP	Colin H. Taylor	685	1.6	−1.8
Majority		9,228	21.7	−12.2
Turnout		42,693	53.6	−0.7
Registered electors		79,646		
Labour Co-op hold		Swing	−6.1	

General election 2001: Ilford South
Party	Candidate	Votes	%	±%
Labour Co-op	Mike Gapes	24,619	59.6	+1.1
Conservative	Suresh Kumar	10,622	25.7	−4.4
Liberal Democrats	Ralph Scott	4,647	11.3	+5.0
UKIP	Harun Khan	1,407	3.4	N/A
Majority		13,997	33.9	+5.5
Turnout		41,295	54.3	−15.9
Registered electors		76,025		
Labour Co-op hold		Swing	+2.7	

=== Elections in the 1990s ===
General election 1997: Ilford South
Party	Candidate	Votes	%	±%
Labour Co-op	Mike Gapes	29,273	58.5	+13.5
Conservative	Neil Thorne	15,073	30.1	−14.3
Liberal Democrats	Aina Khan	3,152	6.3	−3.3
Referendum	David Hodges	1,073	2.1	N/A
Socialist Labour	Bruce G. Ramsey	868	1.7	N/A
BNP	Aron Owens	580	1.2	N/A
Majority		14,200	28.4	+27.4
Turnout		50,019	70.2	−6.5
Registered electors		71,202		
Labour Co-op hold		Swing	+16.6	

General election 1992: Ilford South
Party	Candidate	Votes	%	±%
Labour Co-op	Mike Gapes	19,418	45.4	+7.9
Conservative	Neil Thorne	19,016	44.4	−4.0
Liberal Democrats	George G. Hogarth	4,126	9.6	−4.5
Natural Law	Nandkishore Bramachari	269	0.6	N/A
Majority		402	1.0	N/A
Turnout		42,829	76.7	+4.9
Registered electors		55,741		
Labour Co-op gain from Conservative		Swing	+6.0	

=== Elections in the 1980s ===
General election 1987: Ilford South
Party	Candidate	Votes	%	±%
Conservative	Neil Thorne	20,351	48.4	+2.9
Labour	Kenneth Jones	15,779	37.5	+3.1
Liberal	Ralph Scott	5,928	14.1	−5.4
Majority		4,572	10.9	−0.2
Turnout		42,058	71.8	+1.2
Registered electors		58,572		
Conservative hold		Swing		

General election 1983: Ilford South
Party	Candidate	Votes	%	±%
Conservative	Neil Thorne	18,672	45.5	−1.3
Labour	John Hogben	14,106	34.4	−8.3
Liberal	Ralph Scott	7,999	19.5	+10.6
BNP	R.A. Martin	235	0.6	−0.9
Majority		4,566	11.1	+7.0
Turnout		41,012	70.6	−5.3
Registered electors		58,208		
Conservative hold		Swing		

=== Elections in the 1970s ===
General election 1979: Ilford South
Party	Candidate	Votes	%	±%
Conservative	Neil Thorne	19,290	46.8	+6.6
Labour	Arnold Shaw	17,602	42.7	−2.0
Liberal	Ralph Scott	3,664	8.9	−5.72
National Front	Terence Fitzgerald	636	1.5	N/A
Majority		1,688	4.1	N/A
Turnout		39,230	75.9	+6.17
Registered electors		54,295		
Conservative gain from Labour		Swing		

General election October 1974: Ilford South
Party	Candidate	Votes	%	±%
Labour	Arnold Shaw	17,538	44.71	+4.64
Conservative	Neil Thorne	15,789	40.25	+2.84
Liberal	E. Yates	5,734	14.62	−7.90
More Prosperous Britain	Tom Keen	169	0.43	N/A
Majority		1,749	4.46	+1.80
Turnout		39,230	69.73	−7.20
Registered electors		56,257		
Labour hold		Swing		

General election February 1974: Ilford South
Party	Candidate	Votes	%	±%
Labour	Arnold Shaw	17,201	40.07	−2.96
Conservative	Albert Cooper	16,058	37.41	−8.84
Liberal	Gareth Wilson	9,666	22.52	+14.11
Majority		1,143	2.66	N/A
Turnout		42,925	76.93	+8.8
Registered electors		55,799		
Labour gain from Conservative		Swing		

General election 1970: Ilford South
Party	Candidate	Votes	%	±%
Conservative	Albert Cooper	18,369	46.25	+4.48
Labour	Arnold Shaw	17,087	43.03	−4.56
Liberal	Gerald Leslie Wilson	3,341	8.41	−2.22
National Front	Malcolm Eric Leslie Skeggs	727	1.83	N/A
Independent	Michael Joseph Marks	190	0.48	N/A
Majority		1,282	3.22	N/A
Turnout		39,714	68.13	−8.80
Registered electors		58,292		
Conservative gain from Labour		Swing		

=== Elections in the 1960s ===
General election 1966: Ilford South
Party	Candidate	Votes	%	±%
Labour	Arnold Shaw	20,613	47.59	+9.52
Conservative	Albert Cooper	18,093	41.77	−0.36
Liberal	Irene Watson	4,606	10.63	−8.99
Majority		2,520	5.82	N/A
Turnout		43,312	76.93	+1.92
Registered electors		56,302		
Labour gain from Conservative		Swing		

General election 1964: Ilford South
Party	Candidate	Votes	%	±%
Conservative	Albert Cooper	18,352	42.13	−8.37
Labour	Arnold Shaw	16,659	38.25	+3.20
Liberal	Peter McGregor	8,547	19.62	+5.17
Majority		1,693	3.88	−11.57
Turnout		43,558	75.01	−2.90
Registered electors		58,066		
Conservative hold		Swing		

=== Elections in the 1950s ===
General election 1959: Ilford South
Party	Candidate	Votes	%	±%
Conservative	Albert Cooper	23,876	50.50	−6.23
Labour	Gordon Borrie	16,569	35.05	−8.22
Liberal	Raymond V Netherclift	6,832	14.45	N/A
Majority		7,307	15.45	+1.99
Turnout		47,277	77.91	+2.59
Registered electors		60,678		
Conservative hold		Swing		

General election 1955: Ilford South
Party	Candidate	Votes	%	±%
Conservative	Albert Cooper	27,292	56.73	+1.98
Labour	James Ranger	20,814	43.27	−1.98
Majority		6,478	13.46	+3.96
Turnout		48,106	75.32	−7.34
Registered electors		63,866		
Conservative hold		Swing		

General election 1951: Ilford South
Party	Candidate	Votes	%	±%
Conservative	Albert Cooper	30,177	54.75	+5.24
Labour	James Ranger	24,938	45.25	+3.72
Majority		5,239	9.50	+1.52
Turnout		54,115	82.66	−2.71
Registered electors		66,678		
Conservative hold		Swing		

General election 1950: Ilford South
Party	Candidate	Votes	%	±%
Conservative	Albert Cooper	28,087	49.51	+13.21
Labour	James Ranger	23,558	41.53	−6.47
Liberal	Ronald Acott Hall	4,170	7.35	−8.35
Communist	Dave Kelly	913	1.61	N/A
Majority		4,529	7.98	N/A
Turnout		56,728	85.37	+14.27
Registered electors		66,720		
Conservative gain from Labour		Swing		

=== Elections in the 1940s ===
General election 1945: Ilford South
Party	Candidate	Votes	%	±%
Labour	James Ranger	19,339	48.0	
Conservative	Edward Boulton	14,633	36.3	
Liberal	Eric Arthur Holloway	6,322	15.7	
Majority		4,706	11.7	
Turnout		40,294	71.1	
Registered electors		56,669		
Labour win (new seat)				

== See also ==
- Parliamentary constituencies in London
