= Iremonger =

Iremonger is an English surname, relating to an ironmonger, that may refer to:

- Albert Iremonger (1884–1958), brother of James, county-class cricketer and goalkeeper for Nottinghamshire
- Edmund Iremonger, British politician
- Harold Iremonger (1882–1937), Royal Marine officer and acting Governor of Saint Helena
- James Iremonger (1876–1956), Nottinghamshire cricketer and England soccer international
- Thomas Iremonger (1916–1998), British Conservative Party politician
- Valentin Iremonger (1918–1991), Irish diplomat and poet
- William Iremonger (1776–1852), nineteenth-century English colonel who erected Dead Man's Plack
- Very Rev Frederic Iremonger, DD (1878–1952), eminent Anglican priest
