= 1928 Ilford by-election =

UK parliamentary by-election

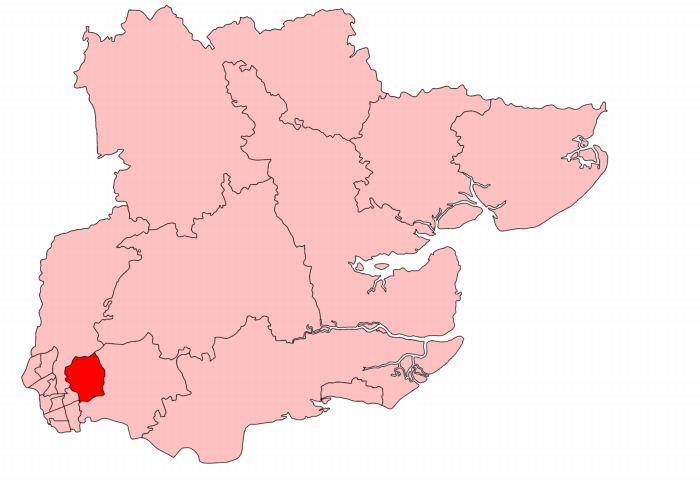
Ilford in Essex, showing boundaries used 1918-45

The 1928 Ilford by-election was a parliamentary by-election for the British House of Commons constituency of Ilford, London on 23 February 1928.

== Vacancy ==
The by-election was caused by the death of the sitting Unionist MP, Sir Fredric Wise at the age of 57 on 27 January 1928 following a sudden heart attack. He had been MP here since winning the 1920 Ilford by-election.

== Election history ==
The constituency was created for the 1918 general election and had been won by Unionists at every election. The Unionists did not come close to losing the seat as the progressive vote had remained evenly split between Liberal and Labour. The result at the last General Election was

1924 general election: Ilford Electorate 52,243
Party	Candidate	Votes	%	±%
Unionist	Fredric Wise	22,825	58.4	+14.0
Labour	Dan Chater	8,460	21.7	+3.6
Liberal	John Morris	7,780	19.9	−17.6
Majority		14,365	36.7	+29.8
Turnout		39,065	74.8	+10.0
Unionist hold		Swing	+5.2	

== Candidates ==
Arthur Comyns Carr

- On 3 February 1928, the Ilford Unionist Association chose 50-year-old Sir George Hamilton as their candidate to defend the seat. He had won the 1913 Altrincham by-election, holding the seat and sat as Unionist Member of Parliament (MP) for Altrincham. He served as Parliamentary Private Secretary to the Minister of Pensions from 1919 to 1920. He held the seat until 1923 when he was defeated by the Liberal candidate. He was then defeated at Lincoln at the 1924 general election. He was the son of a prominent Church of England cleric, the Venerable George Hans Hamilton, Archdeacon of Lindisfarne then Northumberland, Canon of Durham and his wife Lady Louisa Hamilton.
- In February 1927, the Ilford Constituency Labour Party had selected C R de Gruchy as their candidate to challenge for the seat. He was a graduate of Oxford University, where he had been Chairman of the University's Labour Club.
- Since John Morris stood down in November 1925, the local Liberals had been without a prospective candidate. On 3 February 1928, the Ilford Liberal Association adopted 45-year-old Arthur Comyns Carr as their candidate to challenge for the seat. He was the prospective candidate for neighbouring Romford. He first stood for election in 1918 in St Pancras South West against a Conservative opponent who had received the Coalition Coupon and fought the same seat again in 1922. At the 1923 general election he won Islington East turning a Unionist majority of nearly 4,000 into a Liberal majority of 1,632 but he lost the seat at the general election of 1924. He was the son of J. Comyns Carr, a dramatist and art critic. His mother, Alice Laura Strettell (1850–1927) was a novelist.
- There were rumours of a fourth candidate, E.A. Hailwood. He had fought the 1927 Southend by-election, the 1928 Faversham by-election and the 1928 Northampton by-election as an Independent Unionist in quick succession. Hailwood had been critical of Stanley Baldwin the Prime Minister. However, at his last outing, he had been threatened with violence by Unionist Party members which may have influenced his non-participation here. When nominations closed on 15 February, it was to reveal a three-cornered contest between the three main parties.

== Campaign ==
Polling Day was set for 23 February 1928, just 27 days after the death of the former Member of Parliament, allowing for a short campaign. This would have assisted the Labour candidate de Gruchy, as unlike the other two candidates who had only just been selected, he had been in place for 12 months.

On 7 February, the King's Speech was read out in parliament, which provided a focus for the issues of the campaign. All three party leaders, Baldwin, Ramsay MacDonald and David Lloyd George sent public letters of support to their own candidates. On 15 February, the former Prime Minister and Liberal Leader H. H. Asquith died.

== Result ==
The Unionists held the seat, but there was a massive 13.6% swing to the Liberals. The Labour vote share remained the same but the party fell to third place.

Ilford by-election, 1928 Electorate
Party	Candidate	Votes	%	±%
Unionist	George Hamilton	18,269	44.8	−13.6
Liberal	Arthur Comyns Carr	13,621	33.4	+13.5
Labour	C R de Gruchy	8,922	21.9	+0.2
Majority		4,648	11.4	−25.3
Turnout		40,812	67.5	−7.3
Unionist hold		Swing	-13.6	

== Aftermath ==
Hamilton held the seat, defeating Comyns Carr again at the following General Election. The Liberal further reduced the Unionist majority by half;

1929 general election: Ilford Electorate 78,330
Party	Candidate	Votes	%	±%
Unionist	George Hamilton	24,414	42.4	−2.4
Liberal	Arthur Comyns Carr	21,267	36.9	+3.5
Labour	C R de Gruchy	11,952	20.7	−1.2
Majority		3,147	5.5	−5.9
Turnout		57,633	73.6	+6.1
Unionist hold		Swing		

== See also ==
- List of United Kingdom by-elections
- United Kingdom by-election records
