= Ronald Acott Hall =

British diplomat, writer, and politician (1892–1966)

Ronald Acott Hall CBE (24 May 1892 – 21 March 1966) was a British diplomat, writer and politician.

== Background ==
Hall was born in Burton Joyce, Nottinghamshire, the son of J.E. Hall.

== Professional career ==
Hall joined the Foreign Office as a student interpreter in 1914, but served in the Royal Garrison Artillery during World War I. He was appointed to be a vice-consul in China in 1931 and consul (second grade) in 1935. He was Consul-General at Canton (now Guangzhou) 1945–48 and was appointed CBE in the 1946 New Year Honours. Later he was a member of the British section of the European League for Economic Cooperation.

Hall was the author of several books on historic periods in Europe and on China, including the following publications:

- Frederick The Great And His Seven Years' War (1915)
- Studies in Napoleonic Strategy (1918)
- Eminent Authorities on China (1931)
- The Official Pocket Guide to China
- Lame Ducks (a play)
- The 3000 Commonest Chinese Terms (with Neville Whymant, 1948)

== Political career ==
Hall was Liberal candidate for the Ilford South division of London at the 1950 General Election. It was an unpromising seat where the Liberal had come third at the previous election. The 1950 elections were tougher for the Liberals and he finished a poor third.

General Election 1950: Ilford South
Party	Candidate	Votes	%	±%
Conservative	A.E. Cooper	28,087	49.5	+13.2
Labour	J. Ranger	23,558	41.5	−6.5
Liberal	R. A. Hall	4,170	7.4	−8.3
Communist	D. Kelly	913	1.6	n/a
Majority		4,529	8.0	19.7
Turnout			85.37	
Conservative gain from Labour		Swing	+9.8	

He did not stand for parliament again.
