= 1954 Ilford North by-election =

UK parliamentary by-election

The 1954 Ilford North by-election of 3 February 1954 was held after the resignation of Conservative MP Geoffrey Hutchinson, who gave up his seat to become chairman of the National Assistance Board. He subsequently became Baron Ilford. The seat was retained for the Conservatives by Tom Iremonger, who held the seat at the General Election the following year, and who remained the constituency's MP until defeated at the October 1974 election.

== Result ==
Ilford North by-election, 1954
Party	Candidate	Votes	%	±%
Conservative	Thomas Iremonger	18,354	59.76	+4.25
Labour	Thomas W Richardson	9,927	32.32	−5.72
Liberal	George E Thornton	2,430	7.91	+1.46
Majority		8,427	27.44	+9.97
Turnout		30,711	45.40	−39.38
Registered electors		67,689		
Conservative hold		Swing	+5.00	

== Previous result ==
General election 1951: Ilford North
Party	Candidate	Votes	%	±%
Conservative	Geoffrey Hutchinson	31,905	55.51	+3.28
Labour Co-op	Mabel Ridealgh	21,865	38.04	+0.75
Liberal	Henry Eric Pollard	3,709	6.45	−4.03
Majority		10,040	17.47	+2.53
Turnout		57,479	84.78	−1.17
Registered electors		67,796		
Conservative hold		Swing		

== See also ==
- 1978 Ilford North by-election
- 1920 Ilford by-election
