= Vivian Bendall =

British politician

Vivian Walter Hough Bendall (born 14 December 1938) is a British Conservative politician and estate agent. After gaining Ilford North at the 1978 by-election he served as the constituency's Member of Parliament until his defeat in 1997. Bendall is on the right of the party, holding Eurosceptic and hardline views.

== Business life ==
Born in Croydon, Bendall's father and grandfather were both estate agents. After attending Coombe Hill House Preparatory School and Broad Green College in Croydon, he entered the same profession himself in 1956. In 1962 he became a partner of Bendall, Featherby and Co., estate agents of Croydon, and in the next year he became Principal. He remained in charge of the business until 1986. He also worked as a surveyor and valuer.

== Politics ==
After joining the Young Conservatives in 1955, Bendall was Vice-Chairman of Croydon South Young Conservatives in 1965 and Chairman of Greater London Young Conservatives in 1967. He was elected to Croydon Borough Council when it was created as a London Borough in 1964, serving until 1974, and also represented Croydon on the Greater London Council from 1970 to 1973. At the February 1974 general election, he stood for the Conservative Party in Hertford and Stevenage, losing to Labour's Shirley Williams by 8,176 votes; a second try in October 1974 saw defeat by 9,046.

== By-election ==
On 25 November 1975, Bendall was adopted as Conservative candidate for Ilford North, which the Conservatives had narrowly lost to Labour's Millie Miller. At the 1976 Conservative Party conference, he denounced the ruling Labour government as having "strangled the nation" and demanded an immediate general election. At the end of October 1977, Millie Miller died, precipitating a by-election in the seat for which Bendall had been selected. A rival candidate was Tom Iremonger, who had been Conservative MP for the seat for twenty years up to the October 1974 election and stood as a Conservative Independent Democrat. The National Front organised a march through the constituency to support their candidate. Bendall's call for the march to be banned was not supported by Margaret Thatcher who considered it a decision for the police.

By polling day, Bendall was a clear favourite, with some local activists predicting a 5,000 majority. This proved accurate as his majority was 5,497 more than the votes gained by the Labour candidate, Tessa Jowell, later a Cabinet Minister.

== Parliament ==
In Parliament, he was Vice-Chairman of the Backbench Transport Committee, Vice Chairman of the Backbench Foreign Affairs Committee and was Secretary of the conservative 92 Group. He is a Eurosceptic, a supporter of the death penalty and favours the restoration of corporal punishment in schools. He employed future Romford MP Andrew Rosindell as a researcher.

In 1993, Bendall voted against the Third Reading of the Maastricht Treaty in 1993.

== Later life ==
At the 1997 general election Bendall was defeated in Ilford North by Labour candidate Linda Perham. He attempted to win the seat back at the 2001 general election, arranging for his picture to be taken with former Prime Minister Margaret Thatcher. Bendall told reporters that "I have always been an admirer of Lady Thatcher. I intend to use the picture in a press release during the campaign. Other candidates are planning to use them in their addresses. She still plays well on the doorstep." However, Perham was re-elected with a majority reduced to 2,115. In August 2001, during the Conservative leadership election, Bendall's name headed a letter from seven former Conservative MPs expressing "our concern for the unity and electability of the Conservative Party" if Kenneth Clarke were to win, and endorsed Iain Duncan Smith.

Bendall is a Chartered Surveyor and is sole principal of the family practice which was established in Croydon in 1924. The practice is still in being with him as the sole principal, specialising in property management both commercial and residential and commercial rent reviews.

Parliament of the United Kingdom
Preceded by Millie Miller	Member of Parliament for Ilford North; 1978–1997	Succeeded by Linda Perham
