= Fredric Wise =

British politician

Member of Parliament for Ilford, Essex
- In office 25 September 1920 – 26 January 1928
- Preceded by: Peter Griggs
- Succeeded by: George Hamilton

Personal details
- Born: 1871 United Kingdom
- Died: 26 January 1928 (aged 56–57) United Kingdom
- Party: Conservative

Sir Fredric Wise JP DL (1871 – 26 January 1928) was a British politician who served as the Conservative and Unionist Member of Parliament for Ilford in Essex after winning the 1920 Ilford by-election. Wise served until his death in 1928, when he was succeeded in another by-election by George Hamilton.

== Political career ==
Wise ran for parliament in 1920 in a by-election, which was triggered after the death of the Coalition Unionist Member of Parliament Sir William Peter Griggs. He was elected with a majority of the votes cast.

Wise was re-elected in the general elections of 1922, 1923 and 1924.

Wise died in 1928.

== Electoral history ==
=== 1920 by-election ===
1920 Ilford by-election
Party		Candidate	Votes	%	±%
C	Unionist	Fredric Wise	15,612	54.38	−12.4
	Labour	Joseph King	6,577	22.91	+3.4
	Liberal	John Thompson	6,515	22.69	+8.9
Turnout			28,704		
	Unionist hold		Swing		
C indicates candidate endorsed by the coalition government.

=== 1922 general election ===
General election 1922: Ilford
Party	Candidate	Votes	%	±%
Unionist	Fredric Wise	14,071	44.4	−10.0
Liberal	John Thompson	7,625	24.0	+1.3
Labour	Augustus West	5,414	17.1	−5.8
Ind. Unionist	Frederick C. Bramston	4,610	14.5	n/a
Majority		6,446	20.4	−11.1
Turnout			70.5	+4.3
Unionist hold		Swing	-5.6	

=== 1923 general election ===
General election 1923: Ilford
Party	Candidate	Votes	%	±%
Unionist	Fredric Wise	14,136	44.4	0.0
Liberal	John Morris	11,965	37.5	+13.5
Labour	Dan Chater	5,775	18.1	+1.0
Majority		2,171	6.9	−13.5
Turnout			64.8	−5.7
Unionist hold		Swing	-6.8	

=== 1924 general election ===
General election 1924: Ilford
Party	Candidate	Votes	%	±%
Unionist	Fredric Wise	22,825	58.4	+14.0
Labour	Dan Chater	8,460	21.7	+3.6
Liberal	John Morris	7,780	19.9	−17.6
Majority		14,365	36.7	+29.8
Turnout			74.8	+10.0
Unionist hold		Swing	+5.2	
