= Ilford North =

Parliamentary constituency in the United Kingdom, 1945 onwards

Coordinates: 51.594°N 0.085°E

Ilford North (constituency)
- Borough constituency for the House of Commons
- Interactive map of boundaries from 2024
- Location within Greater London
- County: Greater London
- Electorate: 74,684 (March 2020)
- Major settlements: Woodford Bridge, Barkingside, Fairlop, Hainault

Current constituency
- Created: 1945
- Member of Parliament: Wes Streeting (Labour)
- Seats: One
- Created from: Ilford

Ilford North is a constituency (Note: A borough constituency (for the purposes of election expenses and type of returning officer)) in Greater London that was created in 1945. The seat has been represented in the House of Commons of the Parliament of the United Kingdom by Wes Streeting of the Labour Party since 2015. (Note: As with all constituencies, the constituency elects one Member of Parliament (MP) by the first past the post system of election at least every five years.)

== Constituency profile ==
Ilford North is a suburban constituency located in Greater London. It is situated around 11 miles (18 km) north-east of the centre of London and covers the northern parts of the town of Ilford, including the neighbourhoods of Hainault, Fairlop, Barkingside, Clayhall, Gants Hill and Redbridge. The area was traditionally rural but developed rapidly along with much of suburban London during the early 20th century. Today the constituency is suburban in character, interspersed with parks and nature reserves, and is connected to central London by the Central line of the London Underground. The constituency has average levels of wealth; there is some deprivation close to Ilford town centre whilst Clayhall is generally affluent. House prices in the constituency are above the national average but lower than the rest of London.

Ilford North is ethnically and religiously diverse. As of the 2021 census, Asians were the largest ethnic group, making up half of the population and consisting of large Indian, Pakistani and Bangladeshi communities. White people were 33% of the population, around one-third of whom were of non-British origin, including a significant Romanian population. Religiously, the constituency has high proportions of Muslims, Hindus, Sikhs and Jews compared to the rest of the country.

In general, residents of Ilford North are young, and levels of education and income are similar to the rest of London. They are more likely to be homeowners and married compared to other London residents. A high proportion of Ilford North residents work in healthcare and business administration. Most of the constituency is represented by the Labour Party at the local borough council, although some Conservative councillors were elected in Fairlop. An estimated 51% of voters in Ilford North supported remaining in the European Union in the 2016 referendum, marginally higher than the nationwide figure of 48% but lower than the rest of London.

== History ==
The seat was created for the 1945 general election, from the northern part of the former Ilford seat.

== Political history ==
The seat has fluctuated since 1945 between Labour and Conservative representation in the House of Commons. The 2015 result made the seat the 8th narrowest win of Labour's 232 seats by percentage of majority, and in first past the post a 1.2% majority would be considered marginal. The 2017 election saw an 8.5% swing to Labour, increasing their margin in the seat to 9,639 votes (18.2%), the largest majority for a Labour MP in the seat's history. Labour's majority was almost halved during the 2019 general election.

In 2024, Ilford North became the focus of press attention as independent candidate Leanne Mohamad sought to oust incumbent Wes Streeting. One of several independents running primarily on the issue of the Gaza genocide, Whilst Mohamad ended up not winning the seat, she reduced Streeting's majority from 5,198 (10.4%) to 528 (1.2%), making it one of the country's most marginal constituencies.

== Boundaries ==
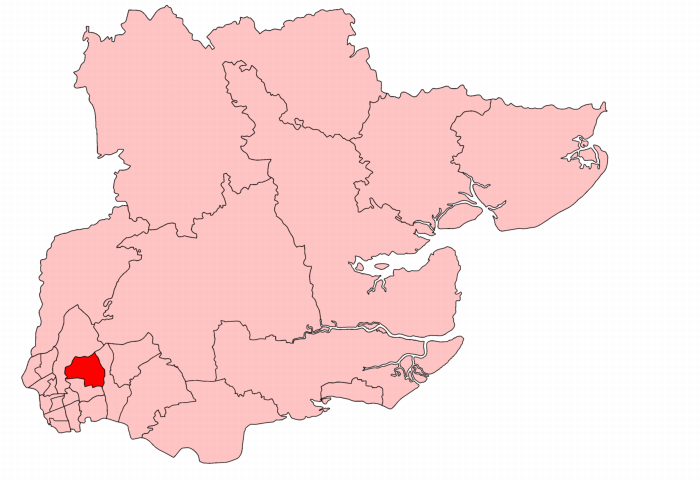
Ilford North in Essex, 1945–50

Map of boundaries 1997–2024

=== Historic ===
1945–1950: The Municipal Borough of Ilford wards of Barkingside, North Hainault, Seven Kings, and South Hainault.

1950–1974: The Municipal Borough of Ilford wards of Barkingside, Clayhall, Fairlop, North Hainault, Seven Kings, and South Hainault.

1974–1983: The London Borough of Redbridge wards of Aldborough, Barkingside, Chadwell, Fairlop, Hainault, and Seven Kings.

1983–1997: As above plus Fullwell

1997–2017: The London Borough of Redbridge wards of Aldborough, Barkingside, Bridge, Clayhall, Fairlop, Fullwell, Hainault, and Roding.

2017–2024: Following a review of ward boundaries which did not effect the parliamentary boundaries, from May 2017 the constituency comprised the following wards:

- Aldborough, Barkingside, Bridge, Clayhall, Fairlop, Fullwell, Hainault, and parts of the Churchfields and South Woodford wards.

=== Current ===
Further to the 2023 review of Westminster constituencies, which came into effect for the 2024 general election, the constituency is composed of:

- The London Borough of Redbridge wards of Aldborough, Barkingside, Clayhall, Cranbrook, Fairlop, Fullwell, Hainault, and Valentines.

The Bridge ward and the part of Churchfields ward were transferred to Chingford and Woodford Green, with the part of South Woodford ward going to Leyton and Wanstead. To compensate, the Cranbrook and Valentines wards were transferred from Ilford South.

== Members of Parliament ==
Election	Member	Party
1945	Mabel Ridealgh	Labour Co-operative
1950	Geoffrey Hutchinson	Conservative
1954 by-election	Tom Iremonger	Conservative
October 1974	Millie Miller	Labour
1978 by-election	Vivian Bendall	Conservative
1997	Linda Perham	Labour
2005	Lee Scott	Conservative
2015	Wes Streeting	Labour

== Election results ==
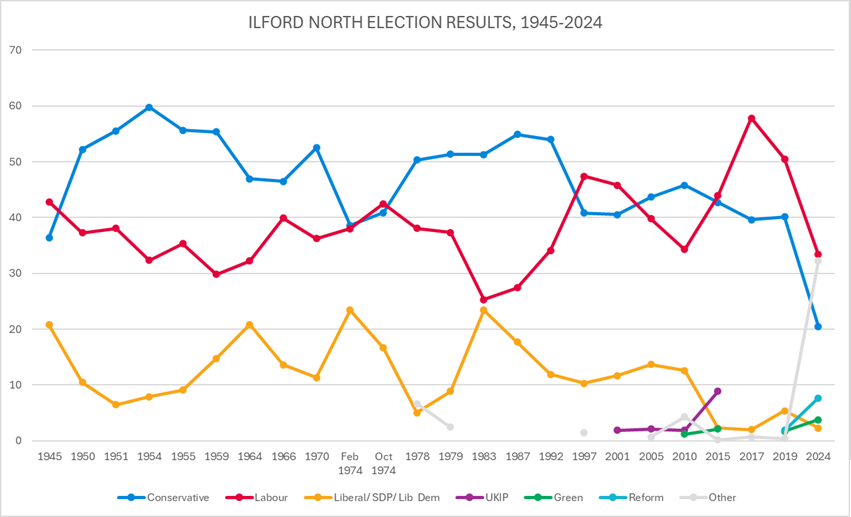
Election results 1945–2024

=== Elections in the 2020s ===
General election 2024: Ilford North
Party	Candidate	Votes	%	±%
Labour	Wes Streeting	15,647	33.4	−20.7
Independent	Leanne Mohamad	15,119	32.2	N/A
Conservative	Kaz Rizvi	9,619	20.5	−16.2
Reform	Alex Wilson	3,621	7.7	+5.8
Green	Rachel Collinson	1,794	3.8	+2.4
Liberal Democrats	Fraser Coppin	1,088	2.3	−1.7
Majority		528	1.2	−16.2
Turnout		46,888	60.2	−9.1
Registered electors		77,835		
Labour hold		Swing		

=== Elections in the 2010s ===
2019 notional result
Party	Vote	%
Labour	28,024	54.1
Conservative	18,994	36.7
Liberal Democrats	2,056	4.0
Others	1,010	2.0
Brexit Party	968	1.9
Green	709	1.4
Turnout	51,761	69.3
Electorate	74,684	

General election 2019: Ilford North
Party	Candidate	Votes	%	±%
Labour	Wes Streeting	25,323	50.5	−7.3
Conservative	Howard Berlin	20,105	40.1	+0.5
Liberal Democrats	Mark Johnson	2,680	5.4	+3.5
Brexit Party	Neil Anderson	960	1.9	N/A
Green	David Reynolds	845	1.7	N/A
CPA	Donald Akhigbe	201	0.4	N/A
Majority		5,198	10.4	−7.8
Turnout		50,134	68.7	−6.1
Registered electors		72,963		
Labour hold		Swing	−3.9	

General election 2017: Ilford North
Party	Candidate	Votes	%	±%
Labour	Wes Streeting	30,589	57.8	+13.9
Conservative	Lee Scott	20,950	39.6	−3.1
Liberal Democrats	Richard Clare	1,034	2.0	−0.4
Independent	Doris Osen	368	0.7	+0.5
Majority		9,639	18.2	+17.0
Turnout		52,941	74.8	+9.8
Registered electors		70,791		
Labour hold		Swing	+8.5	

General election 2015: Ilford North
Party	Candidate	Votes	%	±%
Labour	Wes Streeting	21,463	43.9	+9.6
Conservative	Lee Scott	20,874	42.7	−3.1
UKIP	Philip Hyde	4,355	8.9	+7.0
Liberal Democrats	Richard Clare	1,130	2.3	−10.4
Green	David Reynolds	1,023	2.1	+0.9
Independent	Doris Osen	87	0.2	N/A
Majority		589	1.2	N/A
Turnout		48,932	65.0	−0.2
Registered electors		75,294		
Labour gain from Conservative		Swing	+6.4	

General election 2010: Ilford North
Party	Candidate	Votes	%	±%
Conservative	Lee Scott	21,506	45.8	+2.0
Labour	Sonia Klein	16,102	34.3	−5.4
Liberal Democrats	Alex Berhanu	5,924	12.6	−1.2
BNP	Danny Warville	1,545	3.3	N/A
UKIP	Henri van der Stighelen	871	1.9	−0.3
Green	Caroline Allen	572	1.2	N/A
CPA	Robert Hampson	456	1.0	N/A
Majority		5,404	11.5	+7.7
Turnout		46,976	65.2	+4.1
Registered electors		72,372		
Conservative hold		Swing	+3.7	

=== Elections in the 2000s ===
General election 2005: Ilford North
Party	Candidate	Votes	%	±%
Conservative	Lee Scott	18,781	43.7	+3.2
Labour	Linda Perham	17,128	39.8	−6.0
Liberal Democrats	Mark Gayler	5,896	13.7	+2.0
UKIP	Andrew Cross	902	2.1	+0.2
Independent	Martin Levin	293	0.7	N/A
Majority		1,653	3.8	N/A
Turnout		43,000	60.8	+2.4
Registered electors		70,721		
Conservative gain from Labour		Swing	+4.6	

General election 2001: Ilford North
Party	Candidate	Votes	%	±%
Labour	Linda Perham	18,428	45.8	−1.6
Conservative	Vivian Bendall	16,313	40.5	−0.2
Liberal Democrats	Gavin Stollar	4,717	11.7	+1.4
UKIP	Martin Levin	776	1.9	N/A
Majority		2,115	5.3	−1.3
Turnout		40,234	58.4	−14.3
Registered electors		68,893		
Labour hold		Swing	−0.7	

=== Elections in the 1990s ===
General election 1997: Ilford North
Party	Candidate	Votes	%	±%
Labour	Linda Perham	23,135	47.4	+13.3
Conservative	Vivian Bendall	19,911	40.8	−13.2
Liberal Democrats	Alan Dean	5,049	10.3	−1.6
BNP	Paul Wilson	755	1.5	N/A
Majority		3,224	6.6	N/A
Turnout		48,850	72.7	−5.2
Registered electors		67,151		
Labour gain from Conservative		Swing	+17.3	

General election 1992: Ilford North
Party	Candidate	Votes	%	±%
Conservative	Vivian Bendall	24,678	54.0	−0.9
Labour	Lesley Hilton	15,627	34.1	+6.7
Liberal Democrats	Ralph Scott	5,430	11.9	−5.8
Majority		9,051	19.9	−7.6
Turnout		45,735	77.9	+5.3
Registered electors		58,670		
Conservative hold		Swing		

=== Elections in the 1980s ===
General election 1987: Ilford North
Party	Candidate	Votes	%	±%
Conservative	Vivian Bendall	24,110	54.9	+3.6
Labour	Paul Jeater	12,020	27.4	+2.1
SDP	Graham Tobbell	7,757	17.7	−5.7
Majority		12,090	27.5	+1.5
Turnout		43,887	72.6	+1.3
Registered electors		60,433		
Conservative hold		Swing		

General election 1983: Ilford North
Party	Candidate	Votes	%	±%
Conservative	Vivian Bendall	22,042	51.3	±0.0
Labour	Mike Gapes	10,841	25.3	−10.0
SDP	Ian Roxburgh	10,052	23.4	+14.3
Majority		11,201	26.0	+12.0
Turnout		42,935	71.3	−7.7
Registered electors		60,248		
Conservative hold		Swing		

=== Elections in the 1970s ===
General election 1979: Ilford North
Party	Candidate	Votes	%	±%
Conservative	Vivian Bendall	26,381	51.33	+10.45
Labour	Tessa Jowell	19,186	37.33	−5.15
Liberal	John Freeman	4,568	8.89	−7.75
National Front	John Hughes	804	1.56	N/A
Ind. Conservative	Tom Iremonger	452	0.88	N/A
Majority		7,195	14.0	N/A
Turnout		51,391	79.0	−4.54
Registered electors		65,052		
Conservative hold		Swing		

1978 Ilford North by-election
Party	Candidate	Votes	%	±%
Conservative	Vivian Bendall	22,548	50.31	+9.43
Labour	Tessa Jowell	17,051	38.04	−4.44
Liberal	John Freeman	2,248	5.02	−11.62
National Front	John Hughes	2,126	4.74	N/A
Conservative Independent Democrat	Tom Iremonger	671	1.50	N/A
East London People's Front	Carole Rowe	89	0.20	N/A
New Britain	Alfred Burr	48	0.11	N/A
Democratic Monarchist, Public Safety, White Resident	Bill Boaks	38	0.08	N/A
Majority		5,497	12.27	N/A
Turnout		44,819	69.10	−5.36
Registered electors				
Conservative gain from Labour		Swing		

General election October 1974: Ilford North
Party	Candidate	Votes	%	±%
Labour	Millie Miller	20,621	42.48	+4.48
Conservative	Tom Iremonger	19,843	40.88	+2.32
Liberal	Gareth Wilson	8,080	16.64	−6.80
Majority		778	1.60	N/A
Turnout		48,544	74.46	−5.15
Registered electors		65,195		
Labour gain from Conservative		Swing		

General election February 1974: Ilford North
Party	Candidate	Votes	%	±%
Conservative	Tom Iremonger	19,843	38.56	−13.91
Labour	Millie Miller	19,558	38.00	+1.79
Liberal	Gareth Wilson	12,063	23.44	+12.12
Majority		285	0.56	−15.71
Turnout		51,464	79.61	+11.01
Registered electors		64,649		
Conservative hold		Swing		

General election 1970: Ilford North
Party	Candidate	Votes	%	±%
Conservative	Tom Iremonger	25,142	52.47	+6.0
Labour Co-op	Christopher Sewell	17,352	36.21	−3.71
Liberal	Gareth Wilson	5,425	11.32	−2.29
Majority		7,790	16.26	+9.71
Turnout		47,919	68.60	−8.13
Registered electors		69,852		
Conservative hold		Swing		

=== Elections in the 1960s ===
General election 1966: Ilford North
Party	Candidate	Votes	%	±%
Conservative	Tom Iremonger	23,736	46.47	−0.45
Labour	John Punshon	20,392	39.92	+7.67
Liberal	Jack A. Harris	6,953	13.61	−7.21
Majority		3,344	6.55	−8.12
Turnout		51,081	76.73	−0.18
Registered electors		66,569		
Conservative hold		Swing		

General election 1964: Ilford North
Party	Candidate	Votes	%	±%
Conservative	Tom Iremonger	24,096	46.92	−8.44
Labour	John Anthony Punshon	16,563	32.25	+2.41
Liberal	David Kincaid Mills	10,692	20.82	+6.02
Majority		7,533	14.67	−10.85
Turnout		51,351	76.91	−2.67
Registered electors		66,769		
Conservative hold		Swing		

=== Elections in the 1950s ===
General election 1959: Ilford North
Party	Candidate	Votes	%	±%
Conservative	Tom Iremonger	29,609	55.36	−0.25
Labour	C.F.H. Green	15,962	29.84	−5.46
Liberal	David Kincaid Mills	7,915	14.80	+5.71
Majority		13,647	25.52	+5.21
Turnout		53,486	79.58	+2.98
Registered electors		67,208		
Conservative hold		Swing		

General election 1955: Ilford North
Party	Candidate	Votes	%	±%
Conservative	Tom Iremonger	28,749	55.61	+0.10
Labour	Reginald Groves	18,248	35.30	−2.74
Liberal	Paul Rose	4,702	9.09	+2.64
Majority		10,501	20.31	+2.84
Turnout		51,699	76.60	−8.18
Registered electors		67,496		
Conservative hold		Swing		

1954 Ilford North by-election
Party	Candidate	Votes	%	±%
Conservative	Tom Iremonger	18,354	59.76	+4.25
Labour	Thomas W Richardson	9,927	32.32	−5.72
Liberal	George E Thornton	2,430	7.91	+1.46
Majority		8,427	27.44	+9.97
Turnout		30,711	45.40	−39.38
Registered electors		67,689		
Conservative hold		Swing	+5.00	

General election 1951: Ilford North
Party	Candidate	Votes	%	±%
Conservative	Geoffrey Hutchinson	31,905	55.51	+3.28
Labour Co-op	Mabel Ridealgh	21,865	38.04	+0.75
Liberal	Henry Eric Pollard	3,709	6.45	−4.03
Majority		10,040	17.47	+2.53
Turnout		57,479	84.78	−1.17
Registered electors		67,796		
Conservative hold		Swing		

General election 1950: Ilford North
Party	Candidate	Votes	%	±%
Conservative	Geoffrey Hutchinson	29,950	52.23	+15.82
Labour Co-op	Mabel Ridealgh	21,385	37.29	−5.54
Liberal	S. W. Alexander	6,009	10.48	−10.28
Majority		8,565	14.94	N/A
Turnout		57,334	85.95	+14.43
Registered electors		66,720		
Conservative gain from Labour Co-op		Swing		

=== Elections in the 1940s ===
General election 1945: Ilford North
Party	Candidate	Votes	%	±%
Labour Co-op	Mabel Ridealgh	18,833	42.83	
Conservative	Geoffrey Hutchinson	16,013	36.41	
Liberal	Juliet Rhys-Williams	9,128	20.76	
Majority		2,820	6.42	
Turnout		43,974	71.52	
Registered electors		61,486		
Labour Co-op win (new seat)				

== See also ==
- Ilford South
- Parliamentary constituencies in London
