= Armed Forces Parliamentary Scheme =

UK military experience scheme for politicians, 1983 onwards

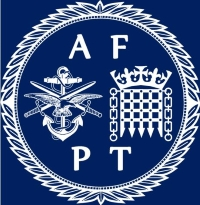
- Founded: 1989
- Founder: Sir Neil Thorne
- Region served: United Kingdom
- Key people: James Gray MP
- Website: afpt-uk.org

The Armed Forces Parliamentary Scheme (AFPS) offers Members of Parliament and Peers experience of the United Kingdom's armed forces. The Scheme runs annually and gives an insight into military life for all three Armed Services, Royal Navy, Army and Royal Air Force. The minimum commitment is 15 days over a 12-month course. Its aim is to improve the quality of debate on military issues by exposing its members to first-hand experience of the service.

The AFPS is administered from within Parliament under the chairmanship of James Gray and one full-time employee. The Scheme is endorsed by the Ministry of Defence with a staff officer from each of the three single Services.

It was founded in 1989 by Sir Neil Thorne, a former Conservative MP, for the benefit of members of both houses of Parliament. It was sponsored by three defence companies - BAE Systems, Rolls-Royce and AgustaWestland.

Since 2013, the Armed Forces Parliamentary Trust is the overarching body that provides governance in the form of a board of trustees and financial support is provided from industry. The trust is registered with The Charities Commission. It is chaired by James Gray MP and trustees include John Gardner, Baroness Hodgson of Abinger CBE, Sir Bill Jeffrey KCB, Air Vice-Marshal Honourable David Murray CVO OBE, The Lord Rogan, The Right Honourable Colonel Robert Stewart DSO MP, William Thomas Tew and Sir Neil Thorne OBE TD DL.

The Armed Forces Parliamentary Trust operates from industry sponsorship. The current sponsors are Airbus Operations UK, Babcock International Group, BAE Systems, Boeing Defence UK, DXC Technology, Elbit Systems UK, General Dynamics UK, Leonardo UK, Lockheed Martin UK, QinetiQ, Raytheon UK and Rolls-Royce.
