= 1937 Ilford by-election =

UK Parliamentary by-election

The 1937 Ilford by-election was held on 29 June 1937. The by-election was held due to the resignation of the incumbent Conservative MP, George Hamilton. It was won by the Conservative candidate Geoffrey Hutchinson.

Ilford by-election, 1937
Party	Candidate	Votes	%	±%
Conservative	Geoffrey Hutchinson	25,533	61.2	−1.9
Labour	James Ranger	16,214	38.8	+1.9
Majority		9,319	22.4	−3.8
Turnout		41,747	37.3	−26.7
Conservative hold		Swing	-1.9	
