= Ernest Jardine =

British politician & businessman (1859-1947)

- Born: Nottingham
- Died: 25 April 1947 (aged 87–88); Nottingham
- Education: Tudor House School, Nottingham; Lycée Impérial, Saint-Omer
- Occupations: Industrialist, politician
- Political party: Liberal Unionist (until 1912); Conservative (from 1912)
- Spouse: Ada Fletcher (d. 1925)
- Children: John
- Parent: John Jardine

Sir Ernest Jardine, 1st Baronet (1859 – 26 April 1947) was a Nottingham, England, industrialist and businessman. He was a Liberal Unionist and later a Conservative Member of Parliament for East Somerset from 1910 to 1918.

== Business interests ==
Jardine took over father's lace machinery business, John Jardine. He had four factories in Nottingham and others in Draycott and Newark, employing some 2,500-3,000 workers in 1907. Another of his factories in Shepton Mallet, Somerset, provides the reason for his adoption as a parliamentary candidate in that county. His company exported lace-making machinery to the United States, France and Germany.

In 1924, he became the owner of the Barlock Tyewriter Company, set up in Basford. The company later became the Byron Typewriter Company and was taken over by the British Oliver Typewriter Company, under licence from the US Oliver Typewriter Company, in 1948.

He was chairman of the Trent Navigation Company until his death.

== Glastonbury Abbey ==
In 1907, Jardine was associated with the purchase of Glastonbury Abbey on behalf of the Ecclesiastical authorities. The Abbey was offered for sale by auction amid considerable disquiet that it could be purchased by "an American plutocrat". Jardine's bid of £30,000 was successful. Jardine announced that he had no intention of living there, but that he would sell the Abbey to the Church of England for what he had paid.

== Politics ==
In the January 1910 general election, Jardine contested the East Somerset constituency as a Liberal Unionist. He defeated the sitting MP, the Liberal John William Howard Thompson, by 4,997 votes to 3,970.

At the following general election, in December 1910, he again defeated Thompson, by 4,748 votes to 3,875. The Liberal Unionist and Conservative parties merged in 1912.

The constituency was abolished at the 1918 general election which Jardine did not contest. He was made a baronet in 1919 and was High Sheriff of Nottinghamshire in 1928–9.

== Personal life ==
Jardine was educated at Tudor House School in Nottingham and at the Lycée Impérial in Saint-Omer, France. He married Ada née Fletcher She died in 1925. They had one son, John, and a daughter, Iris.

Jardine died on 26 April 1947, aged 87. His estate was valued at £502,340 gross (£480,076 net).

Parliament of the United Kingdom
Preceded by John Thompson	Member of Parliament for East Somerset; Jan. 1910–1918	constituency abolished
Baronetage of the United Kingdom
New creation	Baronet (of Nottingham); 1919–1947	Succeeded by John Jardine
