= Millie Miller =

British politician

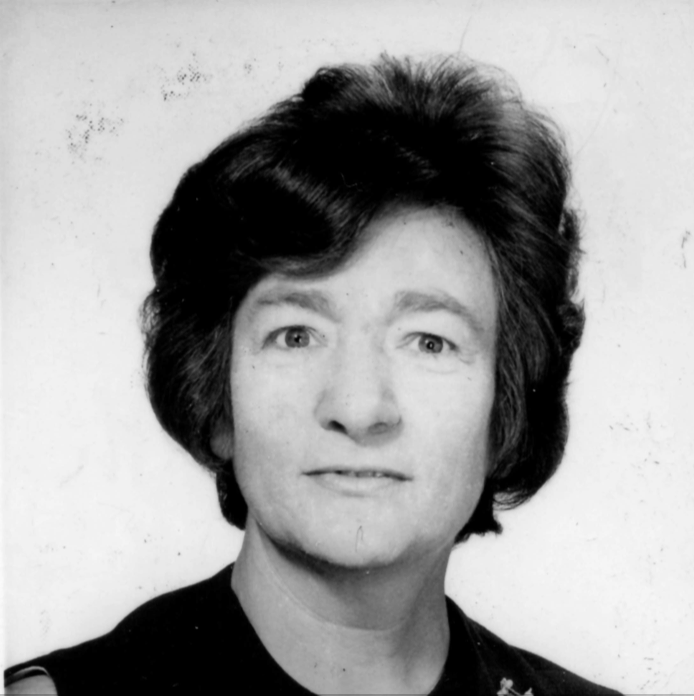
- Miller in 1974

Member of Parliament for Ilford North
- In office 10 October 1974 – 29 October 1977
- Preceded by: Tom Iremonger
- Succeeded by: Vivian Bendall

Personal details
- Born: Millie Haring; 8 April 1922 London, England
- Died: 29 October 1977 (aged 55) Newport Pagnell, England
- Party: Labour
- Spouse: Montague Miller (m. 1940)
- Children: 2

Millie Miller (née Haring; 8 April 1922 – 29 October 1977) was a British Labour Party politician. She was a member of the Stoke Newington and Camden borough councils, and was elected the MP for Ilford North in 1974, holding the office until her death.

== Background ==
Millie Haring was born in Hoxton, London, on 8 April 1922, and grew up in Stoke Newington. She was Jewish, and had older siblings in the Netherlands who were killed in the Holocaust. She was educated at Dame Alice Owen's School and the University of London. In 1940, she married Montague Miller, and they had two children.

== Political career ==
Miller was elected a councillor in Stoke Newington in 1945. She was Mayor of Stoke Newington for the 1957/58 municipal year. When the London Borough of Camden was created in 1965 she was elected to represent the Euston ward. She became the first woman mayor of Camden in the 1967/68 municipal year. In 1971 she was elected to represent the Grafton ward. She became the first woman to lead a London borough council when she became leader of Camden Council in 1971, remaining in the post until 1973.

After coming second to the Conservative incumbent Thomas Iremonger in her first bid to become Member of Parliament for Ilford North in the February 1974 general election, Miller won the seat the following October.

== Death ==
On 29 October 1977, Miller died at a clinic in Newport Pagnell from Hodgkin lymphoma, which she had first been diagnosed with in her twenties. Her successor in the subsequent by-election was the Conservative Vivian Bendall.

Parliament of the United Kingdom
Preceded by Tom Iremonger	Member of Parliament for Ilford North; October 1974 – 1977	Succeeded by Vivian Bendall
