= Cecily Cook =

English left-wing political activist

Cecily Mary Cook OBE née Graves (1889/90–1962) was an English left-wing political activist. She worked for the Independent Labour Party (ILP) and the Co-operative Women's Guild.

== Career ==
Little is known of Cecily Graves' early life, since she came from a poor background in London. Before World War I, she was involved with the suffragette movement. In 1920, she joined the Co-operative Women's Guild's Earlsfield branch in London. She worked for the Independent Labour Party (ILP), compiling political notes for speakers and MPs. She also supported Clement Attlee as chief woman worker when he stood for Parliament in 1922 and 1923, later standing herself as a council of London member in Wandsworth in 1925, representing the Co-operative Women's Guild. After the ILP split away from the Labour Party in 1932, Cook left the party.

Between 1933 and 1938 she worked at the Co-operative Women's Guild's head office. She later held the post of General Secretary from 1940 until she retired in 1953 and she became President of the International Women's Guild. She attended the International Council of Women in London in 1952. In 1948, Cook received the Order of the British Empire.

== Personal life ==
Cook married Herbert G. N. Cook in 1909. They had a son together, who died at the age of 19. After her husband died, Cook cohabited with Arthur Thomas Hagg, an artist. She died at the Whittington Hospital in north London on 28 June 1962 and was cremated at Golders Green crematorium on 3 July 1962.

Non-profit organization positions
Preceded by Rose Simpson	General Secretary of the Women's Co-operative Guild; 1940–1953	Succeeded by Mabel Ridealgh
