= Lee Scott (politician) =

British Conservative Party politician

Cllr Lee Scott
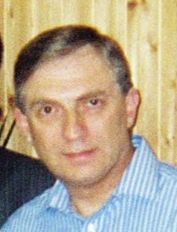

Member of the Essex County Council for Chigwell & Buckhurst Hill East Chigwell and Loughton Broadway (2021–2026)
- Incumbent
- Assumed office 6 May 2021
- Preceded by: Gagan Mohindra
- Majority: 17 (0.3%)

Member of Parliament for Ilford North
- In office 5 May 2005 – 30 March 2015
- Preceded by: Linda Perham
- Succeeded by: Wes Streeting

Personal details
- Born: 6 April 1956 (age 70) West Ham, Essex, England
- Party: Conservative
- Spouse: Estelle Dombey
- Children: 5
- Website: www.lee-scott.org.uk

Lee Scott (born 6 April 1956) is a British Conservative Party politician. He was the Member of Parliament (MP) for Ilford North from 2005 until his defeat at the 2015 general election. Scott is an officer of the Conservative Friends of Israel. In the 2021 Essex County Council election he was elected to the ward of Chigwell & Loughton Broadway, and was narrowly re-elected to the successor seat of Chigwell & Buckhurst Hill East in 2026, surviving the Reform UK wave that toppled the 26-year Conservative administration.

== Early life and career ==
Scott was born in the East End of London to a British Jewish family. He was educated at Clarks College in Ilford and the London College of Distributive Trades.

From 1972 to 1982, Scott was a Director of Scott & Fishell. He was a sales executive for Toshiba from 1982 to 1984, for ITT from 1984 to 1986, and for NKR from 1986 to 1988. From 1988 to 1998, he was Campaign Director for the United Jewish Israel Appeal.

He became a professional fundraiser for several charities, and has also volunteered with Victim Support. He was selected as the Conservative candidate for Waveney in the 2001 general election but failed to win the seat from Labour.

== Member of Parliament ==
In the 2005 general election, Scott gained the Ilford North seat, a key Conservative target that election, defeating the sitting Labour MP Linda Perham. He has a special interest in autism and presented a private member's bill to Parliament dealing with the care of autistic children once they reached adulthood. He was a member of the select committee on transport and was on the select committee on health.

Scott, Patron of the UK Autism Foundation, was nominated by the charity for his work supporting parents, carers, children and adults with autism spectrum disorders across the United Kingdom. He met Prime Minister Tony Blair and autism campaigner Ivan Corea after he raised the issue of autism at Prime Minister's Questions. On 9 December 2010, he abstained from voting on the Higher Tuition Fees Bill, which meant he had to resign his position as an aide to the Transport Secretary, Philip Hammond.

During a Parliamentary debate on antisemitism in 2014, he stated that he had received several death threats because of his espousal of Judaism, including five in the last year. From May 2018 to June 2019, Scott was Special Adviser to the Secretary of State for Housing, Communities and Local Government, James Brokenshire.

At the 2015 general election, despite his party gaining an overall majority, Scott lost his seat to Labour's Wes Streeting; Scott said it was like a "bereavement", commenting that he "didn't anticipate losing". Speaking to The Guardian, he added "It was so close, but right up until 30 minutes before, I was being told that I'd done it – that I'd just scraped home". He stood again at the 2017 snap election called by Theresa May, but was unsuccessful, with the seat seeing an 8.5% swing from the Conservatives to Labour. He had previously said he would not stand again, but chose to do so after receiving "200 calls" from supporters who urged him to do so. In 2018, Scott said that he would not be standing again because "I wouldn't put my family through what we went through in the last three of those four elections", referring to what investigative journalist John Ware called "an antisemitic campaign aimed at ousting him from Parliament" linked to Mend (Muslim Engagement and Development).

== Personal life ==
Scott married Estelle Dombey in 1987; he has three daughters and two sons. He supports Leyton Orient F.C.

Parliament of the United Kingdom
| Preceded by Linda Perham | Member of Parliament for Ilford North; 2005–2015 | Succeeded by Wes Streeting |
