= Geoffrey Hutchinson, Baron Ilford =

British politician

Major The Right Honourable The Lord Ilford QC MC TD

Member of Parliament for Ilford North
- In office 23 February 1950 – 1954
- Preceded by: Mabel Ridealgh
- Succeeded by: Thomas Iremonger

Member of Parliament for Ilford
- In office 29 June 1937 – 5 July 1945
- Preceded by: George Hamilton
- Succeeded by: Constituency abolished

Personal details
- Born: Geoffrey Clegg Hutchinson; 14 August 1893 Prestwich, Bury, Lancashire
- Died: 21 August 1974 (aged 81) Cannes, France
- Party: Conservative
- Spouse: Janet Bidlake (m. 1919)
- Education: Cheltenham College; Clare College, Cambridge

Geoffrey Clegg Hutchinson, Baron Ilford QC, MC, TD (14 October 1893 – 21 August 1974) was a British soldier, a barrister and Conservative Party politician.

== Background and military career ==
Born in Prestwich, he was the youngest son of the cotton manufacturer Henry Omerod Hutchinson and his wife Elizabeth Clegg. He was educated at Cheltenham College and went then to Clare College, Cambridge, graduating with a Master of Arts in 1919. In 1920 Hutchinson was called to the bar by the Inner Temple and went to the Northern Circuit. He was nominated a Queen's Counsel in 1939 and was selected a bencher in 1946.

With the outbreak of the First World War in 1914, Hutchinson joined the Lancashire Fusiliers. He was attached to the British Expeditionary Force until the end of the war and during this time was wounded. In 1916 he was decorated with the Military Cross and in 1933 obtained a captaincy. He was promoted to major in 1937 and was awarded the Territorial Decoration in the next year.

After the begin of the Second World War he was reactivated in 1940 and sent with the then Expeditionary Force to the Franco-Belgian border. Hutchinson was allocated to the War Office in the following year, where he served as deputy assistant to the Military Secretary. He retired in 1945 having reached the age limit and was appointed honorary colonel of the 5th battalion of his former regiment in 1948.

== Political career ==
In 1931 Hutchinson joined Hampstead Borough Council, on which he sat for six years. Subsequently, he served as president of the Non-County Boroughs Association until 1944 and chaired then the finance committee of the London County Council until 1949. Hutchinson continued to represent Hampstead in the County Council until 1952. He was chosen vice-president of the Association of Municipal Corporations in 1944.

After unsuccessfully running for Gower in 1935, Hutchinson entered the House of Commons in 1937, retaining Ilford for the Conservatives at a by-election. He represented that constituency until it was abolished in 1945, That year he ran for the new seat of Ilford North and lost, but won it in 1950 and 1951. In Parliament, Hutchinson became a member of the Select Committee on National Expenditure in 1942 and of the Speaker's Committee in 1944. He sat in the Joint Committee on Consolidation, &c., Bills in 1951 and again two years later.

Hutchinson was almoner and governor of Christ's Hospital. In 1947 he became director of the Colne Valley Water and three years later was president of the British Waterworks Association. He worked in the same function for the Water Companies Association from 1951 and chaired the East Surrey Water Company from the subsequent year. He resigned from Parliament in 1954, when he became chairman of the National Assistance Board, a position he held until 1964. He received a knighthood in 1952 and he became a life peer with the title Baron Ilford, of Bury, in the County Palatine of Lancaster on 14 May 1962.

== Family ==
Hutchinson married Janet Bidlake, youngest daughter of Henry Frederick Keep in 1919. He died in Cannes in France in 1974.

== Arms ==
Coat of arms of Geoffrey Hutchinson, Baron Ilford
Crest A Saracen's head couped at the shoulders Proper wreathed about the temples Argent and Azure charged on the breast with a cross patée Sable between a branch of laurel on the dexter and a branch of oak fructed on the sinister also Proper. Escutcheon Quarterly Azure and Gules a lion rampant Erminois within four cross crosslets fitchy Argent and four bezants alternately in orle. Supporters Dexter a pegasus, sinister a lion, Proper each gorged with an ancient crown Or. Motto Perseverando (By Persevering)

== Notes ==
Parliament of the United Kingdom
Preceded by Sir Collingwood Hamilton, Bt	Member of Parliament for Ilford; 1937 – 1945	Constituency abolished
Preceded by Mabel Ridealgh	Member of Parliament for Ilford North; 1950 – 1954	Succeeded by Tom Iremonger
Military offices
Preceded by The Earl of Derby	Honorary Colonel of the 5th Battalion, Lancashire Fusiliers; 1948–1954	Succeeded by ?
