= Arnold Shaw (politician) =

British politician (1909–1984)

Arnold John Shaw (12 July 1909 – 27 June 1984) was a British Labour Party politician.

Shaw was educated at the Trafalgar Square primary school, Stepney, Coopers' Company School and University College, Southampton. He was a councillor on Stepney Borough Council 1934–38, Ilford Borough Council 1952-65 and the London Borough of Redbridge from 1965.

Shaw contested the constituency of Ilford South six times between 1964 and 1979, twice serving as its Member of Parliament from 1966 to 1970 and from February 1974 to 1979, when he lost the seat to the Conservative Neil Thorne.

Parliament of the United Kingdom
| Preceded by Albert Cooper | Member of Parliament for Ilford South; February 1974–1979 | Succeeded by Neil Thorne |
| Preceded by Albert Cooper | Member of Parliament for Ilford South; 1966–1970 | Succeeded by Albert Cooper |
