= Peter Griggs =

British politician

Sir William Peter Griggs MP

Member of Parliament for Ilford
- In office 14 December 1918 – 11 August 1920
- Succeeded by: Fredric Wise

Personal details
- Born: 1 November 1849 Bethnal Green, London, England
- Died: 11 August 1920 (aged 70) Ilford, London, England
- Party: Coalition Conservative
- Spouse: Georgina
- Occupation: Lighterman then builder and developer

Sir William Peter Griggs (1 November 1849 – 11 August 1920) was an English Member of Parliament for Ilford in north-east London.

== Early life ==
Born at 123 Brick Lane in Bethnal Green, London, Griggs was 7 when his father died. He saved enough money to buy a barge which he operated along the Thames. Griggs was later involved in real estate development in Ilford and Upminster.

== Politics ==
Griggs entered local politics in 1899 when he was elected to Ilford District Council, becoming the chairman in 1910. Since 1901, he had also been an Alderman of Essex County Council. Griggs stood for Parliament in 1910 in the Romford constituency but failed to win the seat. Griggs was successful at his next attempt during the 1918 General Election for the newly formed Ilford constituency with a majority of 11,249. He was knighted in 1916.

In 1920, he died at his home in Ilford after a long illness. This created a by-election which was won by fellow Coalition Conservative Fredric Wise. There is a memorial window dedicated by his widow, Lady Georgina (née Spriggs) at Trinity United Reformed Church, Upminster.

Parliament of the United Kingdom
Preceded by None	Member of Parliament for Ilford; 1918–1920	Succeeded by Fredric Wise
