= 1978 Ilford North by-election =

UK parliamentary by-election

- 2 March 1978

Constituency of Ilford North
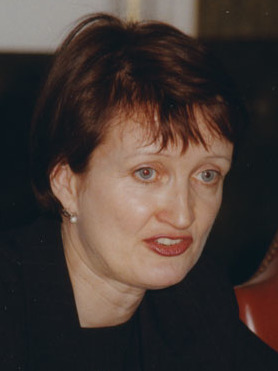
	First party	Second party	Third party
	Con		Lib
Candidate	Vivian Bendall	Tessa Jowell	John Freeman
Party	Conservative	Labour	Liberal
Popular vote	22,548	17,051	2,248
Percentage	50.31%	38.04%	5.02%
Swing	▲9.43%	▼4.44%	▼11.62%
MP before election
Millie Miller
Labour
Elected MP
Vivian Bendall
Conservative

The 1978 Ilford North by-election of 2 March 1978 was held following the death of Labour Member of Parliament (MP) Millie Miller on 29 October 1977. The seat was gained by the Conservatives in a defeat for James Callaghan's government.

== Result ==
1978 Ilford North by-election
Party	Candidate	Votes	%	±%
Conservative	Vivian Bendall	22,548	50.31	+9.43
Labour	Tessa Jowell	17,051	38.04	–4.44
Liberal	John Freeman	2,248	5.02	–11.62
National Front	John Hughes	2,126	4.74	New
Conservative Independent Democrat	Tom Iremonger	671	1.50	New
East London People's Front	Carole Rowe	89	0.20	New
New Britain	Alfred Burr	48	0.11	New
Democratic Monarchist, Public Safety, White Resident	Bill Boaks	38	0.08	New
Majority		5,497	12.27	N/A
Turnout		44,819	69.10	−5.36
Registered electors				
Conservative gain from Labour		Swing		

- Alfred Burr was exposed as a convicted child abuser after nominations closed, resulting in the withdrawal of his endorsement by the New Britain Party and his withdrawal from election six days before the date of the by-election.

== Previous result ==
General election October 1974: Ilford North
Party	Candidate	Votes	%	±%
Labour	Millie Miller	20,621	42.48	+4.48
Conservative	Tom Iremonger	19,843	40.88	+2.32
Liberal	Gareth Wilson	8,080	16.64	−6.80
Majority		778	1.60	N/A
Turnout		48,544	74.46	−5.15
Registered electors		65,195		
Labour gain from Conservative		Swing		

== See also ==
- 1954 Ilford North by-election
- 1920 Ilford by-election
