= Euston (ward) =

- Former electoral ward for the Camden London Borough Council
- Borough: Camden
- County: Greater London
- Population: 5,700 (1966)
- Electorate: 4,852 (1964); 4,341 (1968)
- Area: 176.8 acres (71.5 ha)

Former electoral ward
- Created: 1965
- Abolished: 1971
- Councillors: 2

Euston was an electoral ward in the London Borough of Camden from 1965 to 1971. It was first used at the 1964 elections and last used at the 1968 elections. It returned two councillors to Camden London Borough Council.

== List of councillors ==
Term	Councillor	Party
1964–1968	Millie Miller	Labour
1964–1968	Peter Best	Labour
1968–1971	Nigel Burton	Conservative
1968–1971	Horace Shooter	Conservative

== Camden council elections ==
External image
- Euston ward boundaries from 1965 to 1971

=== 1968 election ===
The election took place on 9 May 1968.

1968 Camden London Borough Council election: Euston (2)
Party	Candidate	Votes	%	±%
Conservative	Nigel Burton	660	51.6	
Conservative	Horace Shooter	638		
Labour	Christopher Kiddy	539	42.5	
Labour	Richard Madeley	530		
Liberal	Roger Brooke	147	5.8	
Turnout			30.2	
Conservative gain from Labour		Swing		
Conservative gain from Labour		Swing		

=== 1964 election ===
The election took place on 7 May 1964.

1964 Camden London Borough Council election: Euston (2)
Party	Candidate	Votes	%	±%
Labour	Millie Miller	738		
Labour	Peter Best	730		
Conservative	Edward Bowman	677		
Conservative	Horace Shooter	649		
Turnout		1,433	29.5	
Labour win (new seat)				
Labour win (new seat)				
