= Neil Thorne =

British politician

Colonel Sir Neil Thorne OBE, TD, DL

Member of Parliament for Ilford South
- In office 3 May 1979 – 16 March 1992
- Preceded by: Arnold Shaw
- Succeeded by: Mike Gapes

Personal details
- Born: Neil Gordon Thorne; 8 August 1932 (age 94)
- Party: Conservative

Colonel Sir Neil Gordon Thorne, OBE TD DL (born 8 August 1932) is a British Conservative Party politician. He contested the constituency of Ilford South six times from October 1974 to 1997, and was the member of parliament for the seat from 1979 to 1992, when he lost by 402 votes to Labour's Mike Gapes.

== Biography ==
Thorne was educated at the City of London School as a youth.

Thorne served in the Territorial Army Royal Artillery, reaching the rank of lieutenant colonel. In 1989, he founded the Armed Forces Parliamentary Scheme, which aims to improve the quality of debate on military issues, and does this by exposing Members of Parliament to first-hand experience of the armed forces.

Thorne is a member of the Steering Group Committee for the British Chinese Armed Forces Heritage project which started in 2015. This is a joint project in collaboration between the Ming-Ai (London) Institute and Regent's University London. Thorne is a freemason, and was Provincial Grand Master of Essex Freemasons for ten years from 1995 to 2005.

In 2018, Thorne attracted media criticism for his application for planning permission to relocate a statue of Emmeline Pankhurst. Suffragettes raised funds and twice negotiated the site of the statue in 1930 and 1956, when the government also attempted to remove the statue. The proposed site in Regent's University London has no link to Pankhurst or suffragette history.

== Honours ==

Ribbon	Description	Notes
	Order of the British Empire (OBE)	Officer; Military Division; 1980 Queen's Birthday Honours List
	Order of St John (K.StJ)	Knight of Justice; 22 August 1995
	Knight Bachelor (Kt)	6 June 1992
	Queen Elizabeth II Silver Jubilee Medal	1977; UK Version of this Medal
	Queen Elizabeth II Golden Jubilee Medal	2002; UK Version of this Medal
	Queen Elizabeth II Diamond Jubilee Medal	2012; UK Version of this Medal
	Efficiency Decoration (TD)	With 1 Clasp.
	Special Constabulary Long Service Medal	
	Service Medal of the Order of St John	

- Sir Neil Thorne also serves as a deputy lieutenant for the London Borough of Brent, allowing him the Post Nominal Letters "DL" for Life.

- He was appointed as the Honorary Colonel of the University of Leeds Officers' Training Corps on 8 August 1999.

== Footnotes ==
Parliament of the United Kingdom
Preceded by Arnold Shaw	Member of Parliament for Ilford South; 1979–1992	Succeeded by Mike Gapes
