= Mike Gapes =

British politician (born 1952)

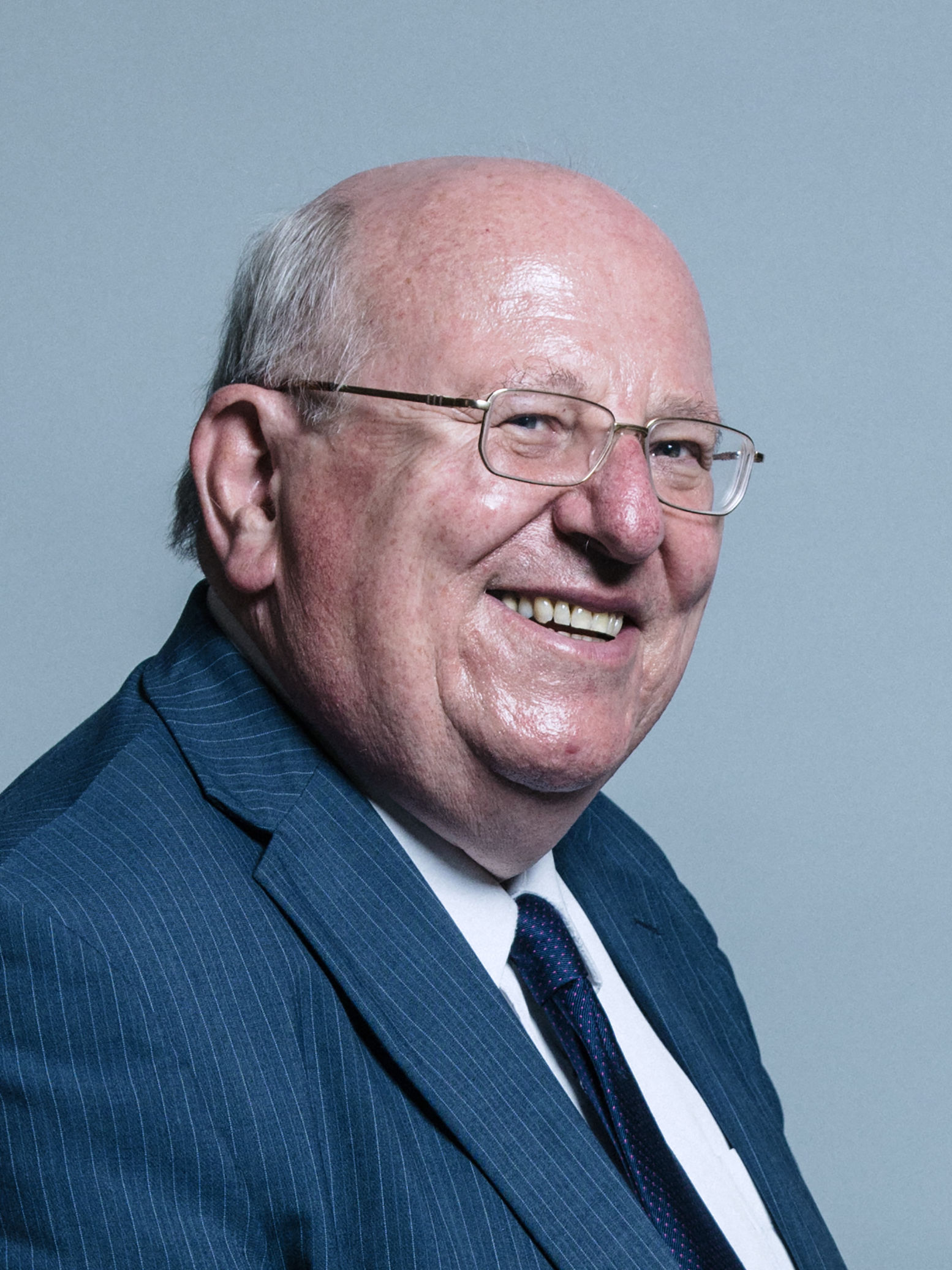
- Official portrait, 2017

Chair of the Foreign Affairs Select Committee
- In office 19 July 2005 – 17 May 2010
- Preceded by: Donald Anderson
- Succeeded by: Richard Ottaway

Member of Parliament for Ilford South
- In office 9 April 1992 – 6 November 2019
- Preceded by: Neil Thorne
- Succeeded by: Sam Tarry

Personal details
- Born: Michael John Gapes; 4 September 1952 (age 74) Wanstead, Essex, England
- Party: Labour and Co-operative (1968–2019; 2023–present)
- Other political affiliations: Change UK (2019)
- Spouse: Frances Smith (m. 1992; div. 2004)
- Children: 3
- Education: Fitzwilliam College, Cambridge (MA)
- Website: www.mikegapes.org
- Other offices: March–June 2019: Change UK Spokesperson for Foreign Affairs and Defence

Michael John Gapes (born 4 September 1952) is a British former politician who served as Member of Parliament (MP) for Ilford South from 1992 to 2019.

Born in Wanstead Hospital, Gapes attended Buckhurst Hill County High School. He studied economics at Fitzwilliam College, Cambridge, where he was Secretary of the Cambridge University Students' Union, and later studied industrial relations at Middlesex Polytechnic. He then served as chair of the National Organisation of Labour Students.

Following an unsuccessful 1983 bid for Parliament, Gapes was elected as a Labour and Co-operative MP in 1992. He served as chair of the Foreign Affairs Select Committee from 2005 to 2010. In February 2019, Gapes left Labour in protest at Jeremy Corbyn's leadership to form The Independent Group, later Change UK, along with six other Labour MPs. In the December 2019 election, Gapes was defeated by Labour's Sam Tarry. He rejoined the Labour Party in March 2023.

== Early life and career ==
Michael John Gapes was born on 4 September 1952, the son of Frank William Gapes, a postman, and Emily Florence Gapes, née Jackson. He was educated at Staples Road Infants' School in Loughton before attending Manford County Primary School and Buckhurst Hill County High School in Chigwell. He worked as a Voluntary Service Overseas teacher in Swaziland in a gap year before attending university in 1972.

Gapes studied economics at Fitzwilliam College, Cambridge, where he was awarded a Bachelor of Arts degree in 1975, which was upgraded by convention to a Master of Arts degree in 1979. He served as Secretary of the Cambridge Students Union in 1973. He completed his education at Middlesex Polytechnic in Enfield where he earned a diploma in industrial relations in 1976, after which he served as chair of the National Organisation of Labour Students before serving for three years as the student organiser for the Labour Party.

== Political career ==
=== Labour Party ===
Gapes was a founder, member, and convenor of the Clause Four Group in 1974, and the sixth Chair of the National Organisation of Labour Students from 1976 to 1977, taking over following the defeat of the Militant tendency. In 1977, he was appointed as the first National Student Organiser of the Labour Party.

Gapes worked at Labour Party Headquarters for 15 years from 1977 until 1992, including serving from 1988 to 1992 as International Secretary of the party. In 1981, he was a member of the anti-nuclear Labour Party Defence Study Group. He told The Guardian that working with Neil Kinnock "to bring the Labour Party back from the abyss of 1983" was most influential in his political thinking.

In his role as international secretary, in 1990 he (along with other MEPs associated with the Fabian Society) urged Kinnock and the Labour Party to be more pro-European, including full economic and monetary union, a common industrial policy, replacing the Common Agricultural Policy with a "good food policy" promoting healthier diets with fewer additives, pesticides, and diversified crops, as well as a European Security Organisation based on NATO and Warsaw Pact co-operation.

Gapes unsuccessfully contested Ilford North at the 1983 general election. He unsuccessfully stood for election to Wandsworth Borough Council in the 1986 election for West Hill ward in Putney, losing by only 50 votes.

=== Member of Parliament for Ilford South ===
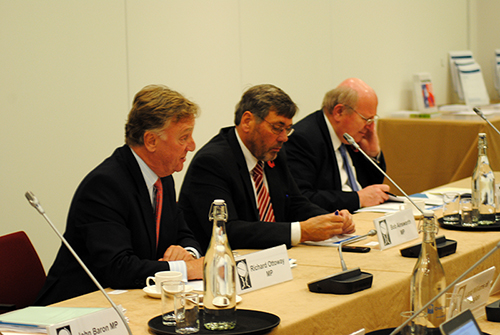
MPs Richard Ottaway, Bob Ainsworth and Mike Gapes (left to right) at a Foreign Affairs Select Committee briefing

He was elected to the House of Commons in the 1992 general election for Ilford South when he defeated the sitting Conservative MP Neil Thorne by just 402 votes. He made his maiden speech on 8 May 1992.

In Parliament he joined the Foreign Affairs Select Committee in 1992 and, after the 1997 general election, he was appointed as the Parliamentary Private Secretary (PPS) to the Minister of State at the Northern Ireland Office Paul Murphy; he also worked for the other Minister of State Adam Ingram until 1999 when he joined the Defence Select Committee. Following the 2001 general election, he was again appointed a PPS to the Minister of State at the Home Office Jeff Rooker for a year. He rejoined the Defence Select Committee in 2003. Following the 2005 general election he served as the chairman of the Foreign Affairs Select Committee until 2010.

Gapes was an officer of many All-party Parliamentary Groups (APPG), including Chair of the All-Party Crossrail Group, Chair of the All-Party Global Security and non Proliferation Group and Chair of the All-Party United Nations Group. He was part of the Northern Ireland team which negotiated the Good Friday Agreement in Belfast in 1998.

During the 2001 and 2005 general election campaigns, he was the target of Muslim groups, including (according to the Ilford Recorder) the Association of Ilford Muslims, and Islamic Society of Britain (Ilford Branch), as well as (according to The Jewish Chronicle) the Muslim Public Affairs Committee UK, who he says sought to unseat him because of his pro-Israel views. Gapes is a member of Labour Friends of Israel (LFI).

In 2007, the Foreign Affairs Select Committee reported that it was "unlikely" any abuse was continuing at the Guantanamo Bay detention camp since 2004, calling the facilities "broadly comparable" to HM Prison Belmarsh. Gapes said: "I thought that we would see detainees in orange overalls kept in cages, but they are now in modern blocks. The images from 2002 were of Camp X-Ray and that is now shut", adding that an immediate shutdown of Guantanamo Bay would lead to a release of individuals back into society who were "dangerous". Andrew Tyrie, chair of the all-party group on extraordinary rendition said the report was a "deep disappointment" and did not acknowledge the moral responsibility to British residents in Guantanamo; Clive Stafford Smith, who represented prisoners at the base, said the report was "full of factual errors" and based on a "show tour" and Kate Allen, director of Amnesty International, called the report "a missed opportunity".

Also in 2007, Gapes was criticised for claiming £22,110 for a second home despite his constituency being only 39 minutes away from Westminster. Gapes responded to the criticism saying "It's perfectly allowed". In 2008, as chair of the Foreign Affairs Committee, Gapes met with the Dalai Lama and asked his opinion on human rights in Tibet. As head of the committee, he was heavily critical of the nuclear program of Iran, arguing that there was a "strong possibility" Iran would develop a nuclear bomb by 2015. Gapes was Chair of the committee until 2010 and continued to be a member of the committee until 2019.

=== Change UK ===
In the summer of 2018, The Independent noted that there was speculation that Gapes might resign over allegations of antisemitism in the party, which he eventually did in 2019. On 18 February 2019, Gapes and six other MPs—Chuka Umunna, Chris Leslie, Angela Smith, Luciana Berger, Gavin Shuker, and Ann Coffey—quit Labour in protest at Jeremy Corbyn's leadership to form Change UK. It cited disagreements over the handling of Brexit and mishandling of anti-Semitism within the Labour Party as key reasons for leaving. For Gapes, foreign policy differences were the major factor, accusing Corbyn in his resignation letter of taking the "wrong side on so many international issues from Russia, to Syria, to Venezuela."

Gapes and his new party came under fire after he described those who criticised them as Islamophobic based on those selected to fight for the party in the European Elections 2019, including the Muslim Council of Britain and anti-racism charity Tell MAMA, as "far left trot trolls" and "cultists." In September 2019, Gapes was ridiculed and accused of 'mansplaining' after he incorrectly corrected the grammar of a tweet by Diane Abbott while making a grammar mistake of his own.

During the 2019 general election campaign, Gapes contacted the Metropolitan Police and electoral authorities after he was targeted by a Twitter troll known as 'Mr Richard Miller', who posed as Gapes' campaign manager and said he was fired for losing Mike Gapes' shoes. Gapes was also threatened with a cease and desist letter from lawyers representing Labour after his campaign leaflets featured the party's red and yellow colours and a slogan reading: "Real Labour Values, Independent Mind". On election night, he lost his seat to Labour's Sam Tarry, ending his 27-year career in the UK Parliament.

== After parliament ==
Gapes rejoined the Labour Party on 7 March 2023. Keir Starmer welcomed his return, stating that it was "a tribute to the hard work already done to change our party." His re-entry came after Luciana Berger rejoined the party in February 2023.

== Political views ==
Gapes has defended the legacies of the former British prime minister Tony Blair and the former American president Bill Clinton. He is a supporter of humanitarian intervention and voted for the invasion of Iraq in 2003 and opposed the Chilcot Inquiry into the causes of the Iraq War. In August 2014 he called for a recall of Parliament to authorise military support for Iraq and intended to vote for Britain becoming involved with the bombing of IS in Syria on 2 December 2015, but was in hospital after suffering chest pains at the time of the vote.

In 2018 Gapes supported a call by the Foreign Affairs Select Committee for an independent inquiry into "the consequences of non-intervention" by Britain in the Syrian civil war. Gapes later criticised Labour Party leader Jeremy Corbyn for apologising for the Iraq War, and argued that the Middle East is better off following the British and American interventions. However, the Foreign Affairs Committee under his chairmanship argued for a re-evaluation of the "special relationship" between Britain and America and criticised Blair's closeness to the American president George W. Bush after the September 11 attacks as damaging to British interests.

Gapes is staunchly pro-European, once declaring that he would prefer closer ties with the European Union, rather than Britain becoming an amusement park for American and Japanese tourists. He introduced 36 amendments to the EU Referendum Bill of 2013. The bill's proposer, James Wharton, alleged that the amendments were an attempt to filibuster. In December 2017, Gapes delivered a speech to the House of Commons in which he warned that Brexit would put the production of Baileys Irish Cream, the milky whiskey liqueur, in jeopardy. The speech, in which he explained how Baileys is produced, was described by Patrick Maguire in the New Statesman as "infinitely memeable" and as giving Gapes "a bizarre online infamy".

During the Labour Party leadership elections in 2010, 2015 and 2016, he supported David Miliband, Liz Kendall and Owen Smith, respectively.

Gapes is a long-time critic of former Labour leader Jeremy Corbyn, and has called him "the racist antisemite". He also criticised Corbyn's supporters, including the prominent group Momentum. Gapes opposed Corbyn's political views on issues such as foreign policy and Brexit. In December 2015, he criticised the Labour Party on Twitter for a U-turn on whether to run a budget surplus in 'normal' economic conditions. This led to him being trolled by supporters of Corbyn online – many of whom told him to leave the party. He also called for the resignation of Corbyn's director of communications, Seumas Milne, following comments Milne made doubting Russian state involvement in the poisoning of Sergei and Yulia Skripal.

== Personal life ==
Gapes married Frances Smith in 1992 and they divorced in 2004. Their daughter Rebecca Gapes died of sudden arrhythmic death syndrome in 2012, at the age of 19. He has two adult stepdaughters. He is a keen supporter of West Ham United.

== Publications ==
- Clarke, Charles; Griffiths, David; Gapes, Mike (1982). Labour and Mass Politics: Rethinking our Strategy. Labour Co-ordinating Committee.
- Gapes, Mike (1988). "Labour's Defence and Security Policy." Rethinking the Nuclear Weapons Dilemma in Europe. Palgrave Macmillan, London. pp. 341–355. ISBN 978-1-349-09181-2
- Gapes, Mike (1988). "The Evolution of Labour's Defence and Security Policy" in Burt, Gordon. Alternative Defence Policy, Routledge, pp. 82–105.
- Gapes, Mike (1990). After the Cold War. Fabian Society. ISBN 978-0-7163-0540-8.
- McNab, Peter (ed.) (2021). Change – The Independent Group, Grosvenor House Publishing. ISBN 978-1-83975-465-4

Parliament of the United Kingdom
Preceded by Neil Thorne	Member of Parliament for Ilford South; 1992–2019	Succeeded by Sam Tarry
