= Linda Perham =

British politician

Member of Parliament for Ilford North
- In office 1 May 1997 – 11 April 2005
- Preceded by: Vivian Bendall
- Succeeded by: Lee Scott

Personal details
- Born: 29 June 1947 (age 79)
- Party: Labour
- Education: University of Leicester

Linda Perham (born 29 June 1947) is a British former politician who served in the House of Commons for nearly eight years as a Labour MP.

== Early life and education ==
Linda Perham was born in King’s College Hospital, Camberwell, South–east London, the daughter of George and Edith (née Overton) Conroy. She attended the Mary Datchelor Girls’ School, and the University of Leicester, where she gained a BA (Special Honours) degree in Classics, and Ealing Technical College where she studied for a postgraduate diploma in librarianship.

== Career ==
Perham was a chartered librarian working at the Greater London Council Research Library, the (then) City of London Polytechnic (later the London Metropolitan University), the Fawcett Library for Women’s Studies, and Epping Forest College. In 2003, she was elected as an Honorary Fellow of the Chartered Institute of Library and Information Professionals.

Having moved to the London Borough of Redbridge in 1973, Perham was elected as a councillor for Hainault Ward in 1989, and was mayor of the borough from 1994-95. She was appointed as a Justice of the Peace in 1990. She has been a long-time active participant in support of the local voluntary and charity sector including serving as a school and college governor, as a member of the Community Health Council, and as a postnatal co-ordinator for the National Childbirth Trust. She co-founded Redbridge Under Fives to campaign for improved children’s services. She was also a Patron of Haven House Children’s Hospice, Anxiety Care Ilford, and President of the Hainault Forest Community Association.

She was elected as the Labour Member of Parliament for Ilford North in 1997 when she defeated her Conservative predecessor, Vivian Bendall. During her time in Parliament, she served on the Select Committees for Accommodation and Works (1997-2001) and Trade and Industry (1998-2005). Perham was the founding chair of the first All Party Parliamentary Group on Libraries, and the All Party Parliamentary Group on Crossrail (now the Elizabeth Line). She introduced a Private Member’s Bill on Age Discrimination in Advertisements leading to the institution of a Code of Practice on Age Diversity in Employment (1999) and continued to campaign on ageism and other issues. In 2002, she presented a Corporate Responsibility bill.

After losing her seat to the Conservative Lee Scott in the 2005 United Kingdom general election, Perham held a number of non-executive and trustee positions including with the Consumer Council for Water, the East Thames Group, TrustMark, the London Voluntary Services Council, Headway West London, Friends of the Women’s Library and the European Care Group. She chaired the Thames Water Trust Fund for 15 years until 2023 and was a member of the court of the University of Leicester from 2010-14. She was most recently Vice Chair of Community Action Redbridge and has been a director/trustee of Vision Redbridge Culture and Leisure since 2011.

== Personal life ==
In 1972, she married Raymond Perham whom she met at the University of Leicester. They have two daughters and four grandchildren.

Parliament of the United Kingdom
Preceded by Vivian Bendall	Member of Parliament for Ilford North; 1997–2005	Succeeded by Lee Scott
