= Joseph King (politician) =

British politician (1860–1943)

Joseph King

Joseph King (31 March 1860 – 25 August 1943), was a British Liberal Party politician who later joined the Labour Party.

== Background ==
He was the eldest son of Joseph King of Liverpool and his wife Phoebe (née Powell). He was educated at Uppingham School, Trinity College, Oxford, (where he was awarded a BA in 1883 and an MA in 1886) Airedale College, Bradford, University of Giessen and University, Berlin. He married, in 1887, Maude Egerton. They had one daughter. He was called to the bar at the Inner Temple in 1889. Maude died in 1927. He married for a second time in 1928, to Helena G. Martins.

== Political career ==
King was Liberal candidate for the New Forest Division of Hampshire at the 1892 General Election, coming second.

General election January 1892 Electorate 10,126
Party	Candidate	Votes	%	±%
Conservative	Hon. John Walter Edward Douglas-Scott-Montagu	4,481	54.6	n/a
Liberal	Joseph King	3,726	45.4	n/a
Turnout		8,207	81.0	n/a
Majority		755	9.2	n/a
Conservative hold		Swing	n/a	

He did not contest the 1895 and 1900 General Elections. In 1904 he contested the 1904 Isle of Thanet by-election as a Liberal Party candidate, coming second. At the 1906 General Election he was Liberal candidate again at Thanet, coming second.

At the January 1910 General Election, King was elected Liberal MP for North Somerset, holding a seat for the party that was gained from the Conservatives in 1906. He was re-elected in December 1910.

Following the outbreak of World War I, King joined the Union of Democratic Control, a group of Liberal and Labour politicians who were critical of the secret diplomacy that they blamed for the conflict. He argued that Britain was obliged to protest at the German invasion of Belgium but not to go to Belgium's aid. He was a pacifist and opposed military conscription. His constituency was abolished as part of the 1918 boundary changes.

=== Support for the Soviet Union ===
He was sympathetic to the Bolsheviks, raising the matter of Trotsky's 1917 detention in a debate in 1918:

"Mr. KING asked the Secretary of State for Foreign Affairs whether he is aware that after the Russian revolution Mr. Trotsky was arrested by British authorities and placed in a camp with German prisoners at Halifax; that he was charged with being a German agent; and whether, in order to remove any ground for suspicion or he will now instruct our Ambassador or Chargé d'Affaires in Petrograd to convey to Mr. Trotsky the British Government's regret for this incident?

"Mr. BALFOUR: Mr. Trotsky was detained at Halifax on suspicion of being a German agent. The answer to the last part of the question is in the negative."

In 1919 he published a pamphlet called Three Bloody Men, in which he blamed the Whites for starting the violence and condemned the British government for encouraging them. Denounced the Whites for having removed the lawful Provisional Government and alienated many anti-Bolsheviks.

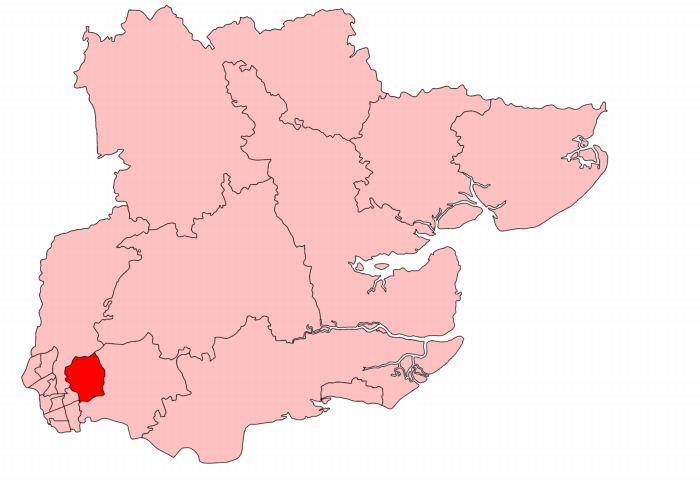
Ilford in Essex, showing boundaries used from 1918 to 1945.

In 1920 he contested the 1920 Ilford by-election as a Labour Party candidate.

1920 Ilford by-election Electorate
Party	Candidate	Votes	%	±%
Coalition Conservative	Fredric Wise	15,612	54.4	−12.4
Labour	Joseph King	6,577	22.9	+3.4
Liberal	John William Howard Thompson	6,515	22.7	+8.9
Majority		9,035	31.5	
Turnout		28,704		
Coalition Conservative hold		Swing		

At the 1923 General Election King was Labour candidate at York, coming second.

In 1933 he published The German revolution, its meaning and menace, warning about Hitler.

== Arts ==
King played a key role in the Peasant Arts movement in Haslemere, Surrey. A number of the items produced are in the Victoria and Albert Museum.

== Bibliography ==
- The School Manager (1903)
- Electoral Reform: An Inquiry into our System of Parliamentary Representation, T. Fisher Unwin (1908)
- Chapter 1. Houses, The Management of Private Affairs, King, Bigham, Gwyer, Cannan, Bridge & Latter, Clarendon Press (1908)
- Filius Nullius (Nobody's Child) (1913), Pamphlet
- The Russian Revolution: The First Year, Union of Democratic Control (1918), Pamphlet
- Soviets and Soviet Government, How it Arose in Russia, How it Works There, How it has been Imitated Elsewhere, and the Chances of Success for Soviets in Other Countries (1919), Pamphlet
- Three bloody men: Mannerheim, "the Butcher" Denikin, the K.C.B., Koltchak, "the Bloody One" (1919)
- Russia and her allies: An account of British policy towards Russia, and of the military intervention of the allies, against the Soviet government, with…now ranged against it (1919), Pamphlet
- The collapse of Germany (1923)
- Peasant Arts (1927)
- The German revolution, its meaning and menace, Williams and Norgate (1933)
- Invasion today, London: Watts & Co. (1941)

== Sources ==
- MacDonald, George (1932). Reminiscenes of a Specialist. Allen & Unwin.
- Swanton, E. W. (1947). "10". A Country Museum. Haslemere: Educational Museum Haslemere.
- Trotter (2003). The Hilltop Writers. The Book Guild.
- Watercolours by Henry George Hine and other artists of the Hine family. London: Christie’s. 1988.
