= Harold Iremonger =

British Royal Marine officer

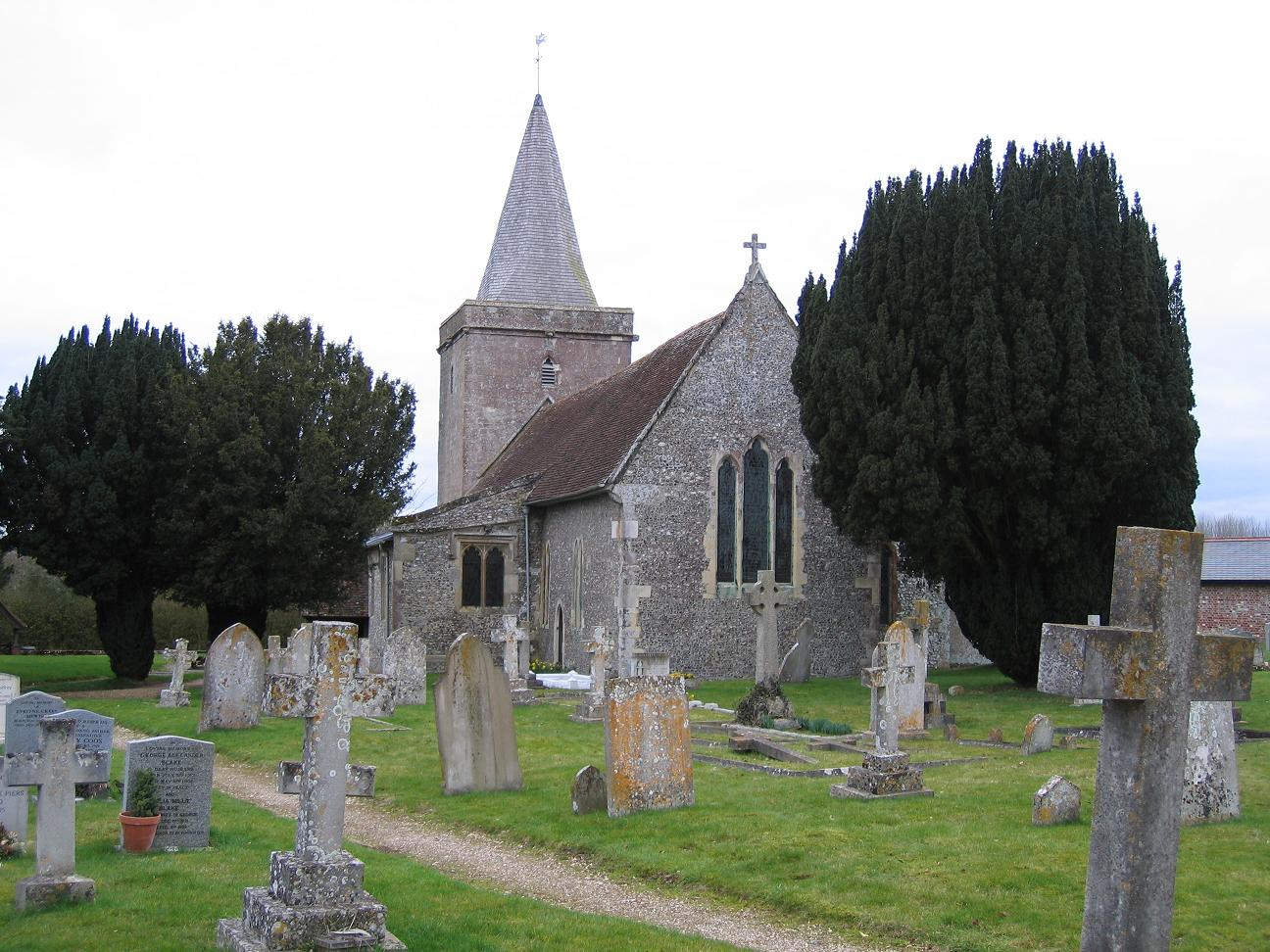
St Peter's, Goodworth Clatford

Lieutenant-Colonel Harold Edward William Iremonger, DSO (20 September 1882 – 9 November 1937) was an officer in the Royal Marine Artillery who later served as acting Governor of Saint Helena.

== Early life ==
Harold Iremonger, eldest son of the Rev. E R Iremonger, vicar of Goodworth Clatford, Andover, was educated at Blundell's School in Tiverton. He was commissioned into the Royal Marine Artillery as a second lieutenant on 1 January 1900, and promoted to lieutenant on 1 January 1901. He obtained his captaincy in 1911.

== World War I ==
After the outbreak of the War Iremonger was with the Grand Fleet and at the Battle of Jutland, on 31 May 1916, being the senior Marine officer in HMS Valiant of the 5th Battle Squadron.

Early in 1917 Iremonger joined the RMA Heavy Siege Train operating in the Belgian coastal sector. In June 1917 he was promoted to major and in the following March became a 'group' commander and his guns fired in support of the Zeebrugge Raid.

Iremonger was mentioned in despatches, received the DSO in 1919, together with the brevet of Lieutenant-Colonel. He also received the Légion d'honneur and the Belgian Croix de Guerre.

== Post war ==
From 1923 to 1927 Iremonger commanded the troops at Saint Helena, and was Acting Governor of Saint Helena for a short period in 1925.

He died at his home at Fareham Hampshire 9 November 1937 aged 55. Colonel Iremonger, a keen motorist and student of archaeology, married Julia Quarry and they had a son, Tom Iremonger, and two daughters.

== Sources ==
- Obituary of Lieut-Colonel Iremonger, The Times, 12 November 1937, p. 18
