= Mabel Ridealgh =

British politician (1898–1989)

Member of Parliament for Ilford North
- In office 5 July 1945 – 22 February 1950
- Prime Minister: Clement Attlee
- Preceded by: New constituency
- Succeeded by: Geoffrey Hutchinson

Personal details
- Born: 11 August 1898
- Died: 20 June 1989 (aged 90)
- Party: Labour

Mabel Ridealgh née Jewitt (11 August 1898 – 20 June 1989) was an English Labour and Co-operative politician. She was member of parliament for the Ilford North constituency between 1945 and 1950, before becoming General Secretary of the Women's Co-operative Guild.

== Career ==
Mabel Jewitt was born on 11 August 1898 to Mark Jewitt and Lucy née Burton in Wallsend-on-Tyne, Northumberland. She began her career working in the civil service. She joined the Women's Co-operative Guild (WCG) in 1920 and the Labour Party the following year. During World War II she worked for the Board of Trade.

Ridealgh was elected as a Labour and Co-operative member of parliament for the newly created seat of Ilford North constituency in the 1945 general election. She campaigned on issues such as National Insurance, housing and nursery schools. She lost the seat in 1950, when it was gained by the Conservatives. She then became General Secretary of the Women's Co-operative Guild from 1953 until 1963.

== Personal life ==
Jewitt married Leonard Ridealgh in 1919 and the couple moved to Enfield in north London. She had a daughter and a son, before her husband died in 1956. She died on 20 June 1989 and was then cremated at the City of London crematorium.

Parliament of the United Kingdom
New constituency	Member of Parliament for Ilford North; 1945 – 1950	Succeeded by Geoffrey Hutchinson
Non-profit organization positions
Preceded by Cecily Cook	General Secretary of the Women's Co-operative Guild; 1953–1963	Succeeded by Kathleen Kempton
