= Clementswood =

Electoral ward in Redbridge, London

- Electoral ward for the Redbridge London Borough Council
- Clementswood ward boundaries since 2018
- Borough: Redbridge
- County: Greater London
- Population: 13,505 (2021)
- Electorate: 8,927 (2022)
- Major settlements: Ilford
- Area: 0.8693 square kilometres (0.3356 sq mi)

Current electoral ward
- Created: 1965
- Number of members: 3
- Councillors: Helen Coomb; Muhammed Javed; Zulfiqar Hussain
- GSS code: E05000501 (2002–2018); E05011240 (since 2018)

Clementswood is an electoral ward in the London Borough of Redbridge. The ward has existed since the creation of the borough on 1 April 1965 and was first used in the 1964 elections. It returns three councillors to Redbridge London Borough Council.

== Redbridge council elections since 2018 ==
There was a revision of ward boundaries in Redbridge in 2018.

=== 2022 election ===
The election took place on 5 May 2022.

2022 Redbridge London Borough Council election: Clementswood
Party	Candidate	Votes	%	±%
Labour	Helen Coomb	1,986	80.4	▲0.8
Labour	Muhammed Javed	1,926	78.0	▲1.8
Labour	Zulfiqar Hussain	1,911	77.4	▲2.1
Conservative	Matthew Cole	401	16.2	▼0.4
Conservative	George Dunkley	351	14.2	▼0.6
Conservative	Bradley Langer	341	13.8	▼4.3
Turnout		2,469	27.7	▼5.6
Labour hold				
Labour hold		Swing		
Labour hold		Swing		

=== 2018 election ===
The election took place on 3 May 2018.

2018 Redbridge London Borough Council election: Clementswood
Party	Candidate	Votes	%	±%
Labour	Helen Coomb	2,378	79.59	N/A
Labour	Muhammed Javed	2,278	76.24	N/A
Labour	Zulfiqar Hussain	2,245	75.13	N/A
Conservative	Matthew Cole	471	15.76	N/A
Conservative	Christopher Cummins	443	14.83	N/A
Conservative	Christopher Holmes	427	14.29	N/A
Turnout		2,988	33.28	
Labour win (new boundaries)				
Labour win (new boundaries)				
Labour win (new boundaries)				

== 2002–2018 Redbridge council elections ==
There was a revision of ward boundaries in Redbridge in 2002.

=== 2010 election ===
The election on 6 May 2010 took place on the same day as the United Kingdom general election.

=== 2006 by-election ===
The by-election took place on 9 November 2006, following the death of Simon Green.

2006 Clementswood by-election
Party	Candidate	Votes	%	±%
Liberal Democrats	Irfan Mustafa	904	41.9	+30.3
Labour	Mark Santos	715	33.1	−20.6
Conservative	Dennis Aylen	377	17.5	−0.5
Independent	Ben Brown	65	3.0	+3.0
Green	Timothy Randall	49	2.2	
British Public Party	Kashif Rana	48	2.2	−9.7
Majority		189		
Turnout			25.1	
Liberal Democrats gain from Labour		Swing		

== 1978–2002 Redbridge council elections ==
=== 1998 election ===
The election took place on 7 May 1998.

=== 1994 election ===
The election took place on 5 May 1994.

=== 1990 election ===
The election took place on 3 May 1990.

=== 1986 election ===
The election took place on 8 May 1986.

=== 1982 election ===
The election took place on 6 May 1982.

=== 1978 election ===
The election took place on 4 May 1978.

== 1964–1978 Redbridge council elections ==
=== 1968 election ===
The election took place on 9 May 1968.

1968 Redbridge London Borough Council election: Clementswood (3)
Party	Candidate	Votes	%	±%
Conservative	J. Owen	1,788		
Conservative	D. Lowther	1,783		
Conservative	H. Jackson	1,747		
Labour	G. Watson	950		
Labour	E. Roberts	910		
Labour	D. Catling	843		
Liberal	W. Jarrold	454		
Liberal	T. Smith	431		
Liberal	B. Harrison	423		
Turnout				
Conservative gain from Labour		Swing		
Conservative gain from Labour		Swing		
Conservative gain from Labour		Swing		

=== 1964 election ===
The election took place on 7 May 1964.

1964 Redbridge London Borough Council election: Clementswood (3)
Party	Candidate	Votes	%	±%
Labour	A. Shaw	1,643		
Labour	G. Watson	1,641		
Labour	G. Tovey	1,611		
Conservative	J. Doyle	1,142		
Conservative	P. Parrish	1,057		
Conservative	G. Brindley	1,012		
Liberal	J. Vincent	864		
Liberal	H. Gerrard	743		
Liberal	W. Harrold	729		
Turnout		3,549	40.5	
Labour win (new seat)				
Labour win (new seat)				
Labour win (new seat)				
