= Albert Cooper (British politician) =

British politician

Member of Parliament for Ilford South
- In office 18 June 1970 – 8 February 1974
- Preceded by: Arnold Shaw
- Succeeded by: Arnold Shaw
- In office 23 February 1950 – 10 March 1966
- Preceded by: James Ranger
- Succeeded by: Arnold Shaw

Personal details
- Born: Albert Edward Cooper; 23 September 1910
- Died: 12 May 1986 (aged 75)
- Party: Conservative

Albert Edward Cooper (23 September 1910 – 12 May 1986) was a Conservative Party politician in the United Kingdom.

He was twice Member of Parliament for Ilford South, from 1950 to 1966, and again from 1970 to 1974. At the end of both terms he lost to Labour candidate Arnold Shaw.

== Bibliography ==
- Leigh Rayment's Historical List of MPs
- Times Guide to the House of Commons February 1974
- Speeches in Parliament and other information from They Work For You
