= John Morris, Baron Morris of Borth-y-Gest =

The Right Honourable The Lord Morris of Borth-y-Gest CH CBE MC PC
- Morris in 1952 by Walter Stoneman

Lord of Appeal in Ordinary
- In office 7 January 1960 – 10 January 1975
- Preceded by: The Lord Somervell of Harrow

Lord Justice of Appeal
- In office 1951–1960
- Preceded by: Sir Cyril Asquith

Judge of the High Court
- In office 1945–1951

Personal details
- Born: John William Morris

John William Morris, Baron Morris of Borth-y-Gest, CH, CBE, MC, PC (11 September 1896 – 9 June 1979) was a judge in England and Wales. He was a Lord of Appeal in Ordinary from 1960 to 1975.

== Early life ==
Morris was born in Liverpool, where his father was a bank manager. He was educated at the Liverpool Institute, but left school on the outbreak of the First World War in 1914 to join the Royal Welsh Fusiliers. He was granted a commission as a temporary second lieutenant (on probation) on 8 January 1916. He served in the British Army until 1918, reaching the rank of captain, and was awarded a Military Cross in January 1919.

T./Capt. John William Morris, 17th Bn., R Welsh Fus. (115th Bde., Intelligence Officer)
For conspicuous gallantry and devotion to duty. After heavy fighting had been carried on among the ruins and outskirts of a village all the afternoon and evening, the situation was very obscure. This officer went out that night, under machine-gun, rifle and shell fire, and, moving along the whole length of the line, obtained accurate information. He was slightly wounded in three places, but remained out until he had collected all available information.

— Military Cross citation

After he was demobilised, he studied law at Trinity Hall, Cambridge, where he was President of the Cambridge Union Society in 1919. He graduated with an LLB in 1920, and won a Joseph Hodges Choate fellowship to study for one year at Harvard.

== Legal career ==
Morris was called to the Bar at Inner Temple in 1921, and joined the Northern Circuit, where he became successful due to his skilful oratory. He was the Liberal Party candidate for Ilford at the 1923 and 1924 general elections, but failed to be elected, coming second and then third behind the incumbent Conservative MP Sir Fredric Wise.

He became a King's Counsel in 1935, and moved to London. He was also Judge of Appeal in the Isle of Man from 1938 to 1947 – the youngest ever to hold such position. He was the chairman of the quarter sessions in Caernarvonshire for 25 years. He became a bencher at Inner Temple in 1943, and served as treasurer in 1967. He became an honorary fellow at Trinity Hall in 1951.

Morris became a High Court judge in 1945, joining the King's Bench Division and receiving the customary knighthood. He was also appointed a Commander of the Order of the British Empire. He became Lord Justice of Appeal in 1951, and also joined the Privy Council. On 7 January 1960, he was appointed Lord of Appeal in Ordinary and was made additionally a life peer with the title Baron Morris of Borth-y-Gest, of Borth-y-Gest in the county of Caernarvonshire. When he retired as Lord of Appeal in 1975, he became a member of the Order of the Companions of Honour.

Although he was born in Liverpool, he was proud of his Welsh descent, and was Pro-Chancellor of the University of Wales from 1956 to 1974. He was not fluent in the Welsh language, but he was a member of the Gorsedd of Bards, and served as vice-president of the Honourable Society of Cymmrodorion. After his retirement from judicial office, he spoke in favour of Welsh devolution in debates on the Wales Act 1978.

He died in Porthmadog, close to Borth-y-Gest where he owned a house. It had been his wish to marry Lady Megan Lloyd George but it was not to be.

=== Selected judgments ===
In Shaw v DPP (1961) UKHL 1, handed down on 4 May 1961, the appellant's conviction for the common law offence of conspiracy to corrupt public morals was upheld by the House of Lords. In his opinion, Morris said:

I join, however, with those of your Lordships who affirm that the law is not impotent to convict those who conspire to corrupt public morals. The declaration of Lord Mansfield (see Jones v. Randall, 1774, Lofft. 383) that "whatever is contrary, bonos mores est decorum [good manners are proper], the principles of our law prohibit, and the King's Court, as the general censor and guardian of the public manners, is bound to restrain and punish", is echoed and finds modern expression in Kenny's Outlines of Criminal Law (17th Edn.) in the statement that agreements by two or more persons may be criminal if they are agreements to do acts which are outrageously immoral or else are in some way extremely injurious to the public. There are certain manifestations of conduct which are an affront to and an attack upon recognised public standards of morals and decency and which all well-disposed persons would stigmatise and condemn as deserving of punishment. The cases afford examples of the conduct of individuals which has been punished because it outraged public decency or because its tendency was to corrupt the public morals.

It is said that there is a measure of vagueness in a charge of conspiracy to corrupt public morals and also that there might be peril of the launching of prosecutions in order to suppress unpopular or unorthodox views. My Lords, I entertain no anxiety on those lines. Even if accepted public standards may to some extent vary from generation to generation, current standards are in the keeping of juries who can be trusted to maintain the corporate good sense of the community and to discern attacks upon values that must be preserved. If there were prosecutions which were not genuinely and fairly warranted juries would be quick to perceive this. There could be no conviction unless twelve jurors were unanimous in thinking that the accused person or persons had combined to do acts which were calculated to corrupt public morals. My Lords, as time proceeds our criminal law is more and more being codified. Though it may be that the occasions for presenting a charge such as that in Count 1 will be infrequent, I concur in the view that such a charge is contained within the armour of the law and that the jury were in the present case fully entitled to decide the case as they did.
