= 1920 Ilford by-election =

UK parliamentary by-election

- 25 September 1920

Candidate	Wise	King	Thompson
Party	Unionist	Labour	Liberal
Popular vote	15,612	6,577	6,515
Percentage	54.38%	22.91%	22.69%
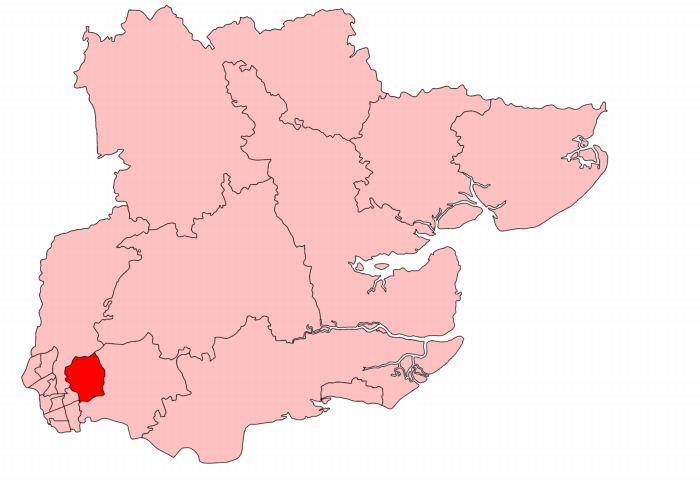
MP before election
Griggs
Unionist
Subsequent MP
Wise
Unionist

The 1920 Ilford by-election of 25 September 1920 was held after the death of the Coalition Unionist Member of Parliament Sir William Peter Griggs. The Coalition retained the seat in the by-election.

== Candidates ==
- Fredric Wise, a stockbroker, was the Coalition Unionist candidate.
- Joseph King was the Labour candidate. He was a former Liberal MP for North Somerset.
- Major John William Howard Thompson was the Liberal candidate. He was a former MP for East Somerset.

British Pathe has newsreel footage of the three candidates standing outside their election count. http://www.britishpathe.com/video/election-at-ilford/query/election

== Result ==
Ilford by-election, 1920
Party		Candidate	Votes	%	±%
C	Unionist	Fredric Wise	15,612	54.38	−12.4
	Labour	Joseph King	6,577	22.91	+3.4
	Liberal	John Thompson	6,515	22.69	+8.9
Majority			9,035	31.47	−15.0
Turnout			28,704	66.2	+7.9
	Unionist hold		Swing	+4.0	
C indicates candidate endorsed by the coalition government.

== Aftermath ==
Wise was re-elected at the following General Election when Thompson again stood, but this time, beat the Labour candidate into third place.

1922 general election: Ilford
Party	Candidate	Votes	%	±%
Unionist	Fredric Wise	14,071	44.4	−10.0
Liberal	John Thompson	7,625	24.0	+1.3
Labour	Augustus West	5,414	17.1	−5.8
Ind. Unionist	Frederick C. Bramston	4,610	14.5	New
Majority		6,446	20.4	−11.1
Turnout		31,720	70.5	+4.3
Unionist hold		Swing	-5.6	

== See also ==
- List of United Kingdom by-elections (1918–1931)
- 1954 Ilford North by-election
- 1978 Ilford North by-election
