= Newbury (ward) =

- Electoral ward for the Redbridge London Borough Council
- Newbury ward boundaries since 2018
- Borough: Redbridge
- County: Greater London
- Population: 14,459 (2021)
- Electorate: 9,735 (2022)
- Area: 1.758 square kilometres (0.679 sq mi)

Current electoral ward
- Created: 1978
- Number of members: 3
- Councillors: Thavathuray Jeyaranjan; Sunny Brar; Niki Chahal
- ONS code: 00BCGP (2002–2018)
- GSS code: E05000510 (2002–2018); E05011250 (2018–present)

Newbury is an electoral ward in the London Borough of Redbridge. The ward was first used in the 1978 elections. It returns councillors to Redbridge London Borough Council. The ward was subject to boundary revisions in 2002 and 2018.

== Redbridge council elections since 2018 ==
There was a revision of ward boundaries in Redbridge in 2018.

=== 2022 election ===
The election took place on 5 May 2022.

2022 Redbridge London Borough Council election: Newbury
Party	Candidate	Votes	%	±%
Labour	Sunny Brar	1,957	64.5	▲7.5
Labour	Thavathuray Jeyaranjan	1,916	63.1	▲5.2
Labour	Niki Chahal	1,907	62.8	▲6.3
Conservative	Krishna Bandaru	781	25.7	▼5.7
Conservative	Maureen Ashley	762	25.1	▼0.4
Conservative	Swapna Kalsi	745	24.5	▼2.0
Liberal Democrats	Andrew Eracleous	293	9.7	New
Turnout		3,035	31.2	▼9.8
Labour hold		Swing		
Labour hold		Swing		
Labour hold		Swing		

=== 2018 election ===
The election took place on 3 May 2018.

2018 Redbridge London Borough Council election: Newbury
Party	Candidate	Votes	%	±%
Labour	Thavathuray Jeyaranjan	2,280	57.90	N/A
Labour	Dev Sharma	2,246	57.03	N/A
Labour	Elaine Norman	2,230	56.63	N/A
Conservative	Afsor Hussain	1,235	31.36	N/A
Conservative	Greta Rene	973	24.71	N/A
Conservative	Baldev Bains	887	22.52	N/A
Independent	David Stephens	484	12.29	N/A
Independent	Amritpal Gill	254	6.45	N/A
Turnout		3,938	41.03	
Labour win (new boundaries)				
Labour win (new boundaries)				
Labour win (new boundaries)				

== 2002–2018 Redbridge council elections ==
There was a revision of ward boundaries in Redbridge in 2002.

=== 2002 by-election ===
The by-election took place on 11 July 2002, following the disqualification of Dev Sharma.

2002 Newbury by-election
Party	Candidate	Votes	%	±%
Labour	Dev Sharma	1,356	47.2	−5.9
Conservative	Surenda Patel	1,313	45.7	+12.1
CPA	Juliet Hawkins	206	7.2	+7.2
Majority		43	1.5	
Turnout		2,875	30.0	
Labour hold		Swing		

== 1978–2002 Redbridge council elections ==
=== 1998 election ===
The election took place on 7 May 1998.

=== 1996 by-election ===
The by-election took place on 25 July 1996, following the death of Brian Myers.

1996 Newbury by-election
Party	Candidate	Votes	%	±%
Labour	Greer Nicholson	1,673	55.1	
Conservative	Harold Moth	1,174	38.7	
Liberal Democrats	Susanne Newman	188	6.2	
Majority		499	16.4	
Turnout		3,035	36.0	
Labour hold		Swing		

=== 1986 election ===
The election took place on 8 May 1986.

=== 1983 by-election ===
The by-election took place on 28 April 1983, following the death of Arthur Barker.

1983 Newbury by-election
Party	Candidate	Votes	%	±%
Conservative	Howard Palmcr	1,777		
Labour	Royston Emmett	967		
Alliance	Dennis Carradice	494		
Turnout				
Conservative hold		Swing		
