= John Thompson (politician, born 1861) =

British Liberal Party politician, solicitor and soldier

John Thompson

John William Howard Thompson (1861-17 October 1959) was a British Liberal Party politician, solicitor and soldier.

== Background ==
He was educated at Carshalton and Whitgift School, Croydon. He married Antoinette Ebden Keene of Crewkerne, Somerset. They had two daughters. His wife died in 1940. His daughter Antoinette Winifred Thompson married the 6th Marquess Conyngham.

== Career ==
He worked as a solicitor. He was Liberal MP for Somerset East from 1906 to 1910. He gained the seat at the 1906 General Election from the Liberal Unionists.

General election 1906 Electorate 9,717
Party	Candidate	Votes	%	±%
Liberal	John Thompson	4,553	53.9	
Liberal Unionist	Bertram Falle	3,890	46.1	
Majority		663	7.8	
Turnout				
Liberal gain from Liberal Unionist		Swing		

He served just one parliamentary term before losing his seat back to the Liberal Unionists at the General Election in January 1910.

General election January 1910 Electorate 9,791
Party	Candidate	Votes	%	±%
Liberal Unionist	Ernest Jardine	4,997	55.7	9.6
Liberal	John Thompson	3,970	44.3	−9.6
Majority		1,027	11.4	
Turnout				
Liberal Unionist gain from Liberal		Swing	+9.6	

He stood again at the General Election of December 1910 but was unable to regain his seat.

General election December 1910 Electorate 9,791
Party	Candidate	Votes	%	±%
Liberal Unionist	Ernest Jardine	4,748	55.1	−0.6
Liberal	John Thompson	3,875	44.9	+0.6
Majority		873	10.2	−1.2
Turnout				
Liberal Unionist hold		Swing	-0.6	

He was a captain in the Devonshire 11th Service battalion in 1915 and a major in the 24th (County of London) Battalion (The Queen's) in 1916. He did not contest the 1918 General election. He did however contested the 1920 Ilford by-election, where he finished third;

Ilford by-election, 1920
Party	Candidate	Votes	%	±%
Coalition Conservative	Fredric Wise	15,612	54.38	−12.4
Labour	Joseph King	6,577	22.91	+3.4
Liberal	John Thompson	6,515	22.69	+8.9
Turnout		28,704		
Coalition Conservative hold		Swing		

He remained at Ilford to contest the seat at the 1922 General Election, when he came second, pushing Labour into third place.

1922 General Election Electorate 45,013
Party	Candidate	Votes	%	±%
Unionist	Fredric Wise	14,071	44.4	−10.0
Liberal	John Thompson	7,625	24.0	+1.3
Labour	A West	5,414	17.1	−5.8
Ind. Unionist	FC Bramston	4,610	14.5	n/a
Majority		6,446	20.4	−11.1
Turnout			70.5	
Unionist hold		Swing	-5.6	

He did not contest the following three General Elections but remained a supporter of the Liberal Party. His return to the electoral fight came at the 1931 General Election, when he returned to Somerset and fought the Conservative seat of Wells. Much of the Wells constituency was part of the Somerset East constituency that he had represented before the First World War. He came second with a credible vote share;

General election 1931: Wells
Party	Candidate	Votes	%	±%
Conservative	Anthony Muirhead	17,711	58.7	
Liberal	John Thompson	12,440	41.3	
Majority		5,271	17.5	
Turnout			17.5	
Conservative hold		Swing		

He did not stand for parliament again.

== Sources ==
- Who Was Who
- British parliamentary election results 1885–1918, Craig, F. W. S.

Parliament of the United Kingdom
Preceded by Henry Hobhouse	Member of Parliament for Somerset Eastern; 1906–January 1910	Succeeded by Ernest Jardine
