= James Ranger =

British politician

James Ranger (1889 – 26 April 1975) was a British politician. He was the Labour Member of Parliament (MP) for Ilford South from 1945 to 1950, having unsuccessfully fought the pre-war Ilford constituency in a 1937 by-election and being selected to fight the general election for that seat in 1939 or 1940; which was postponed due to the Second World War.

Parliament of the United Kingdom
New constituency	Member of Parliament for Ilford South; 1945 – 1950	Succeeded by Albert Cooper
