= Tom Iremonger =

British politician

Thomas Lascelles Isa Shandon Valiant Iremonger (14 March 1916 – 13 May 1998) was a British Conservative Party politician.

The son of Colonel Harold Iremonger and his wife Julia Quarry, he was educated at King's School, Canterbury and Oriel College, Oxford, where he gained a sailing blue. Iremonger then worked as a District Officer in the Colonial Administrative Service in the Western Pacific. During World War II, he served with the Royal Naval Volunteer Reserve (RNVR), and joined the New Zealand Navy in 1942, being commissioned the following year. He was an editor, author, journalist and Lloyd's of London underwriter, and worked as a public relations officer and for Conservative Central Office. A barrister, he was called to the Bar by Inner Temple. He served as a councillor on Chelsea Borough Council 1953.

Iremonger contested Birmingham Northfield in 1950. He was elected Member of Parliament for Ilford North at the 1954 by-election, and served until 1974 when he was defeated by Labour's Millie Miller in the October election of that year. In 1978 he stood in the by-election, after Miller had died, as 'Conservative Independent Democrat', coming fifth.

He gained 19,843 votes in both the February and October 1974 general elections, winning the former and losing the latter.

He married Lucille D'Oyen Parks, who later became a successful writer and broadcaster, in 1939. She died in 1989. They had one daughter. Iremonger was a cousin of Anthony Eden.

Parliament of the United Kingdom
Preceded by Geoffrey Hutchinson	Member of Parliament for Ilford North; 1954–October 1974	Succeeded by Millie Miller
