= 1933 Altrincham by-election =

UK parliamentary by-election

The 1933 Altrincham by-election was a parliamentary by-election held on 14 June 1933 for the British House of Commons constituency of Altrincham in Cheshire.

== Vacancy ==
The seat had become vacant when the constituency's Conservative Member of Parliament (MP), Cyril Atkinson, had resigned from the House of Commons on being appointed a High Court judge. He had held the seat since the 1924 general election, when he had defeated the one-term Liberal MP Robert Alstead.

== Electoral history ==
Atkinson had been returned unopposed at the 1931 general election, when the local Liberals decided not to field a candidate as both parties were supporting the National Government. Prior to that, Altrincham had regularly changed hands between the Conservatives and the Liberals. The contests were close apart from those occasions when a Labour candidate stood, resulting in the Conservatives winning easily, such as at the last contested election in 1929;

General election 1929: Altrincham Electorate 69,607
Party	Candidate	Votes	%	±%
Unionist	Cyril Atkinson	28,512	50.7	−10.3
Liberal	Robert Alstead	18,475	32.9	−6.1
Labour	Alfred Dobbs	9,242	16.4	New
Majority		10,037	17.8	−4.2
Turnout		56,229	80.8	−4.0
Unionist hold		Swing	-2.1	

Altrincham was a constituency with an electorate that was growing quickly; between 1929 and 1931, over 6,000 additional people had been added to the register and in the two years since 1931 a further 2,000 had been added.

== Candidates ==
- The Conservative Party fielded Sir Edward Grigg, the former Liberal MP for Oldham. After distinguished service in the Great War, he had been private secretary to Liberal Prime Minister David Lloyd George from 1920 to 1922, and had later been Governor of Kenya from 1925 to 1930.
- The Liberals did not choose 60-year-old former MP and four time candidate Robert Alstead. Instead the Liberal Party imported the radical Manchester Liberal, Philip Oliver, who had been MP for Manchester Blackley from 1923 to 1924 and from 1929 to 1931.
- The Labour Party also imported a candidate, as was usually the case, fielding James Hudson, who had been MP for Huddersfield from 1923 to 1931.

This meant that all three candidates were former MPs seeking re-election.

== Campaign ==
An issue to feature in the campaign was the National Government's decision in April to order a British Trade Embargo on the Soviet Union. When the Soviet government placed a number of British engineers on trial for sabotage, the British government protested the arrests and retaliated with an embargo on trade between the two countries. (The engineers were subsequently found guilty, but the Soviet government permitted them to return to Britain.) At the same time the National Government signed a new trade agreement with Nazi Germany. The Soviet embargo had interfered with the business of some Altrincham engineering firms who had contracts with the Soviet Government. This issue was uncomfortably handled by the Conservative candidate Sir Edward Grigg who was accused by the Liberal campaign of shifting his ground on the issue in an attempt to avoid losing votes. This issue helped to re-inforce the difference between the Liberal Party and the Conservative dominated National Government. The Liberal Party supported Free trade and their leaders had resigned from the government at the end of 1932 over the government's decision to introduce trade tariffs. However, the party remained on the government benches. This made it difficult for the Liberal campaign in Altrincham to take full advantage of public discontent with the government.

== Result ==
Grigg held the seat for the Conservatives with a comfortable majority of 9,500 votes over Oliver.

Philip Oliver

Altrincham by-election, 14 June 1933 Electorate 78,244
Party	Candidate	Votes	%	±%
Conservative	Edward Grigg	25,392	51.2	+0.5
Liberal	Philip Oliver	15,892	32.0	−0.9
Labour	James Hudson	8,333	16.8	+0.4
Majority		9,500	19.2	+1.4
Turnout		49,617	63.4	−17.4
Conservative hold		Swing	+0.7	

- Percentage change and swing are calculated from 1929.

== Aftermath ==
Grigg held the seat until its abolition for the 1945 general election, when he was ennobled as Baron Altrincham.

General election, 1935: Altrincham Electorate 100,341
Party	Candidate	Votes	%	±%
Conservative	Edward Grigg	50,719	70.2	+19.0
Labour	Abraham Moss	21,493	29.8	+13.0
Majority		29,226	40.4	+21.2
Turnout		72,212	72.0	+8.6
Conservative hold		Swing	+3.0	

In 1935 Oliver returned to contest Manchester Blackley without success. Hudson was defeated again at Stockport in 1935, but returned to the House of Commons in 1945 as MP for Ealing West. The National Government ended the Soviet Trade embargo on 1 July 1933.

== See also ==
- Altrincham constituency
- 1913 Altrincham by-election
- Altrincham
- Lists of United Kingdom by-elections
- United Kingdom by-election records
