= St Paul's Church, Hooton =

Coordinates: 53.2906°N 2.9509°W

St Paul's Church, Childer Thorton
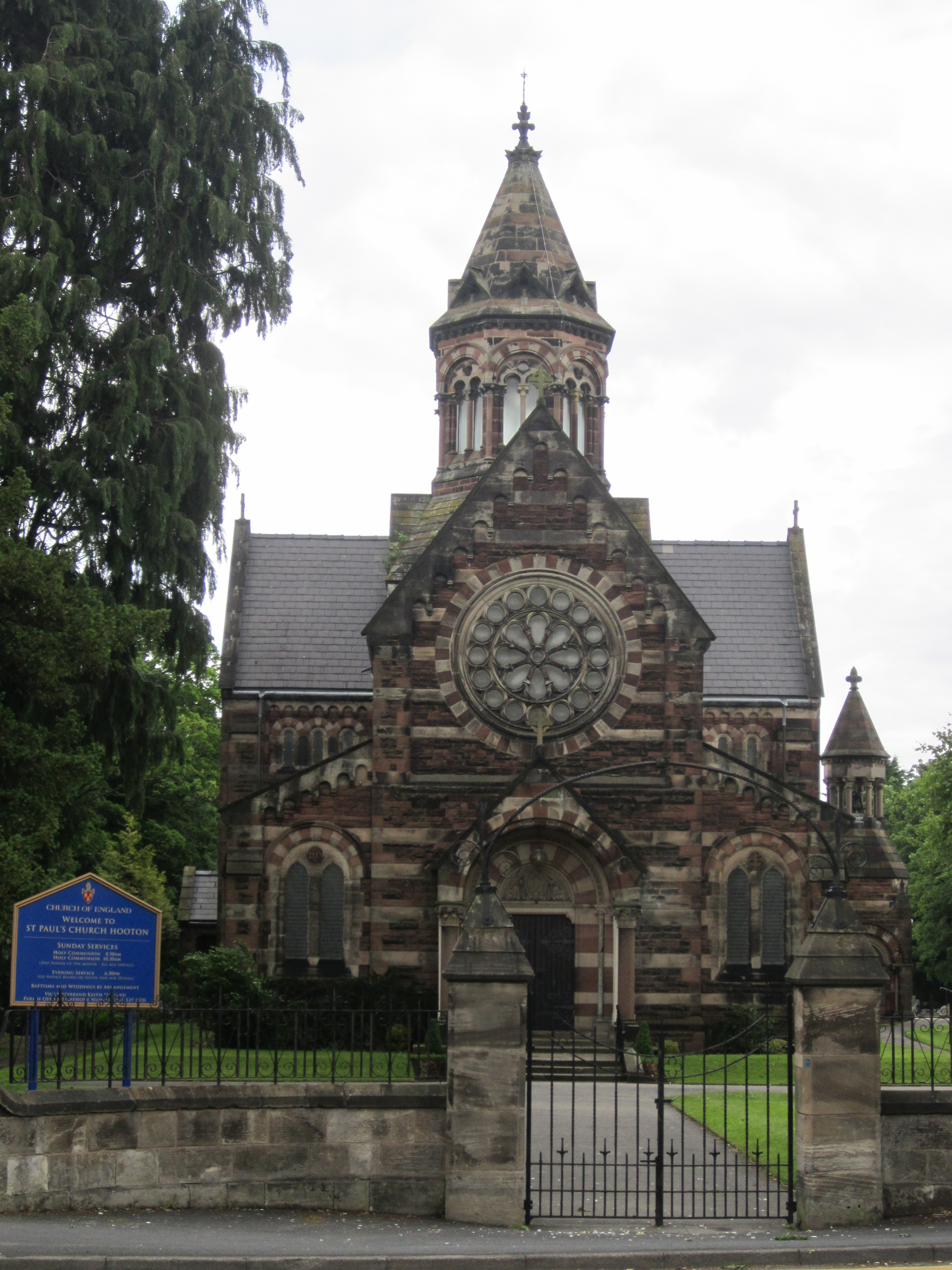
- West face of St Paul's Church, Hooton.jpg

- Location in Cheshire
- OS grid reference: SJ 367 775
- Location: Hooton, Cheshire
- Country: England
- Denomination: Anglican
- Website: St Paul, Hooton

Architecture
- Heritage designation: Grade II
- Designated: 17 May 1985
- Architect: James K. Colling
- Architectural type: Church
- Style: Romanesque Revival, Gothic Revival
- Groundbreaking: 1858
- Completed: 1862
- Construction cost: £5,000

Specifications
- Materials: Red and white stone Slate roofs

Administration
- Province: York
- Diocese: Chester
- Archdeaconry: Chester
- Deanery: Wirral South
- Parish: St Paul, Hooton

Clergy
- Vicar: Rev Mark Turner

St Paul's Church is in the village of Hooton, Cheshire, England. It is an active Anglican parish church in the deanery of Wirral South, the archdeaconry of Chester, and the diocese of Chester. The church is recorded in the National Heritage List for England as a designated Grade II* listed building. The authors of the Buildings of England series describe it as "unquestionably one of the most spectacular churches of Cheshire".

== History ==
The church was built between 1858 and 1862 to a design by James K. Colling for the Liverpool banker R. C. Naylor at a cost of £5,000 (equivalent to £530,000 in 2025).

== Architecture ==
=== Exterior ===
St Paul's is constructed in a mixture of red and white ashlar stone and red rock-faced stone. The roofs are slated. The plan of the church is cruciform. It consists of a three-bay nave, north and south aisles, north and south transepts, a chancel with north and south aisles continuing as an ambulatory, a west porch and a south porch. Above the crossing is the base of a dome rising from pendentives surmounted by a lantern with a short spire. Above the south porch is a detached belfry spire. The west porch is Romanesque in style, and above it is a rose window. Some of the other windows in the church are Romanesque, while others have pointed arches with plate tracery.

=== Interior ===
Inside the church the arcades are carried on Peterhead granite, with capitals in French Early Gothic style. The font is made from dark green serpentine. It dates from 1851, and gained a medal at the Great Exhibition that year. The stained glass includes windows by Heaton, Butler and Bayne, Clayton and Bell, and Kempe. The two-manual organ was built by Rushworth and Dreaper.

== External features ==
The churchyard contains the war graves of five World War II airmen, four British and one Australian.

== See also ==
- Grade II* listed buildings in Cheshire West and Chester
- Listed buildings in Hooton, Cheshire
