= Coningsby Disraeli =

British politician

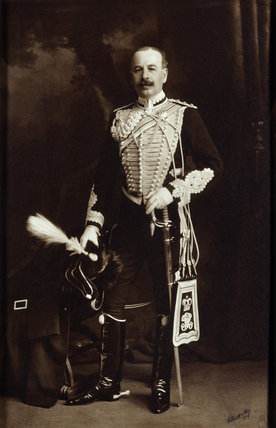

Member of Parliament for Altrincham
- In office 4 July 1892 – 12 January 1906
- Preceded by: William Cunliffe Brooks
- Succeeded by: William Crossley

Personal details
- Born: 25 February 1867 Kensington, London
- Died: 30 September 1936 (aged 69) Hove, East Sussex
- Party: Conservative
- Education: Charterhouse School, New College, Oxford
- Military career
- Allegiance: United Kingdom
- Branch: British Army
- Service years: 1900–1921
- Rank: Major
- Conflicts: First World War

Coningsby Ralph Disraeli (25 February 1867 – 30 September 1936), was a British Conservative politician, and MP for Altrincham.

== Early life and education ==
Disraeli was born in Kensington, London, in February 1867, to Ralph Disraeli (1809–1898) and Katherine (née Trevor) (1837–1930), His father was the third son of the writer Isaac D'Israeli, and his paternal uncle was future Prime Minister, Benjamin Disraeli, whose 1844 novel, Coningsby, he was named after. Benjamin was noted to have been close to Coningsby, and named him as the heir to his estate, including Hughenden Manor, in 1875, reportedly remarking "That boy will come to the front. I will, when the time comes, give him a start". Benjamin consequently oversaw and directed his education, with Coningsby studying first at Charterhouse School and later New College, Oxford, before moving to Charsley's Hall, owing to a dispute with examiners.

Following his uncle's death in April 1881, Coningsby, then 14, became the subject of intense press coverage, with many noting his attendance at Disraeli's funeral, where he reportedly wept at the head of the coffin for some time. The following month he was presented to Queen Victoria by Lord Rowton at Windsor Castle. Due to his age, Coningsby was unable to legally inherit his uncle's estate until his 21st birthday, so trustees managed the inheritance until 1888.

== Early career ==
In the years after the death of his uncle, Disraeli gradually became more publicly involved in politics. He regularly attended Conservative gatherings and events, and he was a member of the short-lived Beaconsfield Club and The Primrose League. Through his family connections, he was acquainted with a number of notable political figures, including Sir George Elliot, through whom he was presented to the Prince of Wales in Newcastle in 1884.

Disraeli was also involved in amateur singing and dramatics. In 1884 he performed at a charity event in Whitby, and while at Oxford he was a member of the university's Dramatic Society, regularly performing on stage, including at the opening of the second New Theatre in 1886.

Following his 21st birthday, Disraeli made his debut as a politician, delivering a speech at a Conservative event in April 1888. He supported Henry Robert Graham during the 1890 by-election for St Pancras North, but Graham was defeated by the Liberal candidate, Thomas Henry-Bolton. Shortly afterwards Coningsby himself began expressing interest in standing for election, with seats in Sheffield and Buckinghamshire considered for his contention before it was announced in May that year that he had accepted an invitation to stand for the constituency of Altrincham in the 1892 general election, in place of the retiring William Cunliffe Brooks. Disraeli spent the next two years making a number of public appearances in the area in preparation for the election, and was elected in July 1892.

=== Parliamentary career ===
During his 13-year stint as MP, Disraeli was heavily involved in agricultural affairs as well as the Licensing Bill in 1902 and 1905. He continued to make regular appearances across his constituency and regularly hosted meetings of the local Conservative Association. He was re-elected twice, in 1895 and 1900, but was defeated in the 1906 general election by the Liberal candidate William Crossley. He later stood unsuccessfully for re-election twice in Rushcliffe, first in January 1910, and again in December, during which time his motor-car was attacked and pelted with stones and mud by a crowd of youths while Disraeli was driving to a meeting.

=== Military career ===
Disraeli was an officer in the Buckinghamshire Yeomanry, where he was commissioned a second lieutenant on 18 April 1900, before being promoted to Lieutenant on 11 June 1902. He worked with the R.A.F. during the First World War, and had reached the rank of Major at the time of his retirement in 1921.

== Personal life and death ==
Disraeli was engaged to Marion Grace Silva OBE, in 1896, and the couple were married at St. Margaret's, Westminster, on 2 March 1897.

Disraeli was High Sheriff of Buckinghamshire in 1931.

Disraeli underwent a serious operation in July 1936, and died without issue in a nursing home in Hove, East Sussex, in September that year, aged 69, after developing pneumonia. Hughenden was sold, and eventually acquired by the National Trust in 1949. Marion died in 1963, aged 87.

Parliament of the United Kingdom
Preceded by William Cunliffe Brooks	Member of Parliament for Altrincham; 1892–1906	Succeeded by William Crossley
