= Voluntary hospital =

Non-profit private hospital

A voluntary hospital is a non-profit private hospital. They can be distinguished from for-profit private hospitals, and municipal or public hospitals, which are publicly owned. Created from the eighteenth century onwards in England, hospitals using this model were established later in the United States, Ireland, and Australia. They were initially financed by public subscription, philanthropy and fundraising, but in some cases voluntary hospitals now accept varying degrees of state funding for their activities. A voluntary hospital may also be a charitable hospital.

== United Kingdom ==
By the middle of the 18th century, there were six in London: St Barts, Guy's, St Thomas', Westminster, St George's, and St Mary's (the last to be founded in England, in 1851). They provided free medical care to those who could not afford it. They were "amongst the chief sources of the advancement of medical science". They were the earliest teaching hospitals.

The 1851 census recorded 7,619 patients in hospital in England and Wales. At that time, those who could afford it were generally cared for in their own homes. In 1901, there were 39,184 hospital patients. Standards of care, and of nursing in particular, had improved as formal training was established and staffing ratios improved. Nursing was almost entirely by women. Even in 1937, there were less than 100 male nurses employed in the voluntary hospitals. In 1900, there were about 11,000 nurses working in voluntary hospitals, some of whom were sent out to do domiciliary nursing. In 1937, there were more than 33,000, mostly actually in the hospitals. They worked longer hours for less pay than nurses in the municipal hospitals.

After the First World War, the hospitals began to admit private paying patients, and by 1921, 171 of the provincial hospitals had pay beds.

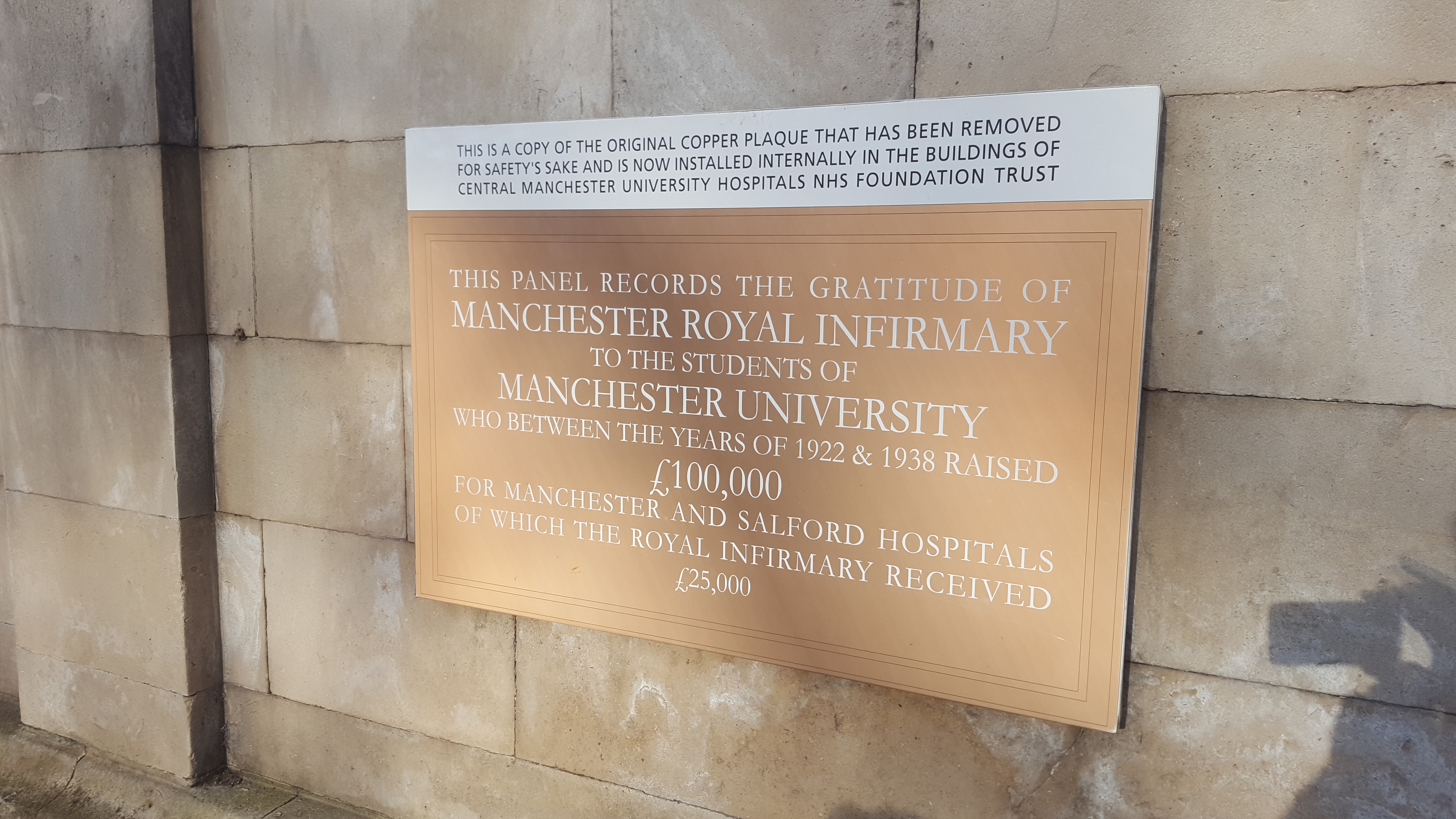
Plaque on the wall of Manchester Royal Infirmary

Public collections, Hospital Saturday Funds and flag days to support the hospitals continued in the UK until the 1930s.

The voluntary hospitals of Manchester in 1929 were the Royal Infirmary, St Mary's Hospital, the Royal Eye Hospital, the Royal Children's Hospital, Ancoats Hospital, the Northern Hospital for Women and Children, the Ear Hospital, St John's Ear Hospital, the Hospital for Consumption, the Hospital for Diseases of the Skin, the Christie Cancer Pavilion, the Radium Institute, the Jewish Hospital, the Babies' Hospital and the Dental Hospital; the Salford voluntary hospitals were Salford Royal Hospital and Greengate Hospital.

The King's Fund supported the voluntary hospitals in London.

Ten of the largest and most influential former voluntary hospitals in England established the Shelford Group in 2011 to protect their common interests.

== Australia ==
A similar business model applied to all general hospitals in New South Wales up to the 1950s. Despite the charitable structure, much of the capital and half of the operating losses were being funded by state government by 1913.

== Ireland ==
In Ireland the model is still in use.
