= Hooton, Cheshire =

Village in Cheshire, England

Coordinates: 53.299°N 2.955°W

Hooton
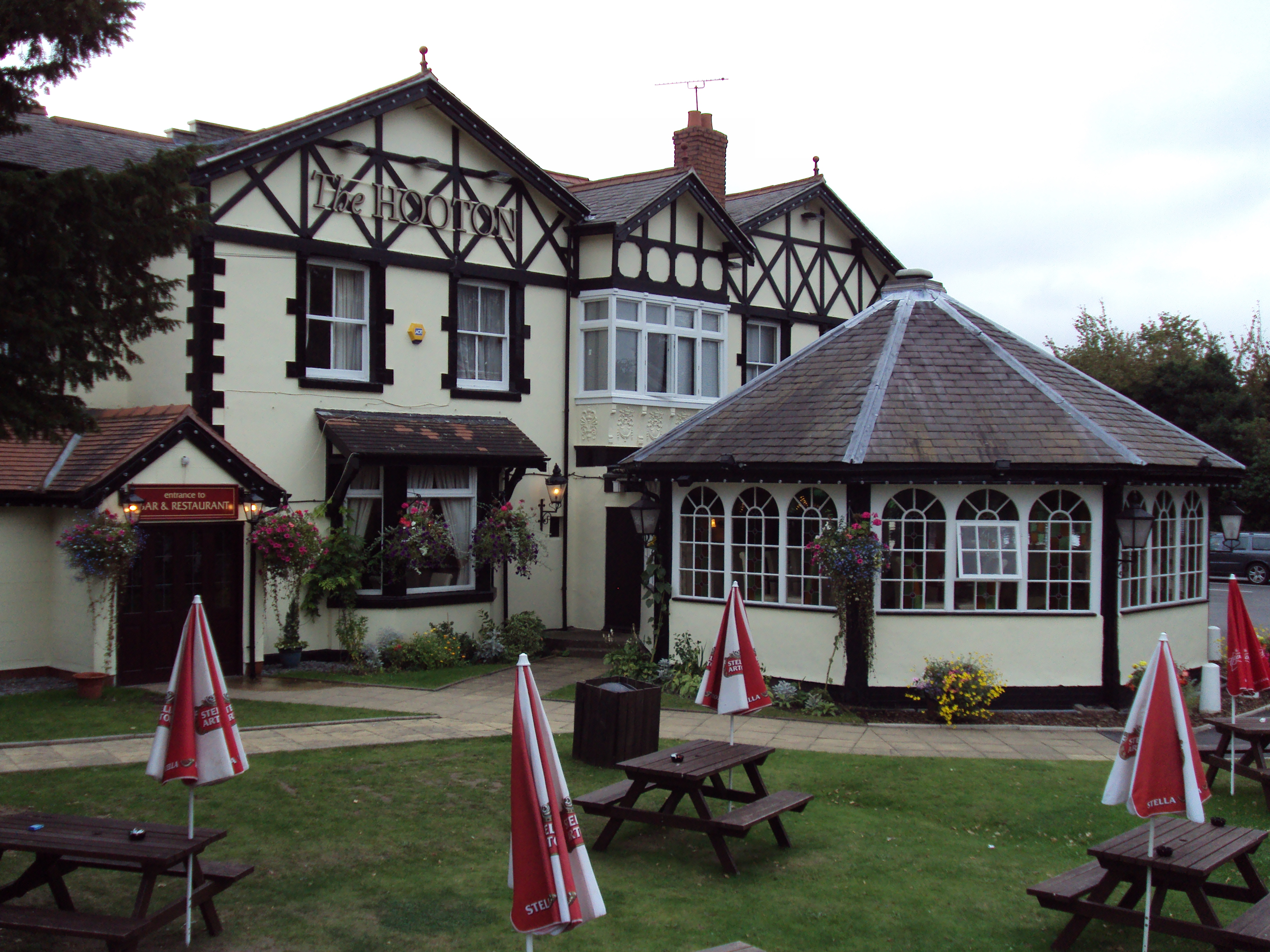
- 'The Hooton' public house - 2020 closed and boarded up.

- Location within Cheshire
- Population: 385 (2011 census)
- OS grid reference: SJ363784
- Unitary authority: Cheshire West and Chester
- Ceremonial county: Cheshire
- Region: North West
- Country: England
- Sovereign state: United Kingdom
- Post town: ELLESMERE PORT
- Postcode district: CH66
- Dialling code: 0151
- Police: Cheshire
- Fire: Cheshire
- Ambulance: North West
- UK Parliament: Chester North and Neston

Hooton is a suburban village and former civil parish on the Wirral Peninsula, within the unitary authority of Cheshire West and Chester and the ceremonial county of Cheshire, England. It was once a separate village but was incorporated into Ellesmere Port as the town expanded outwards during the twentieth century.

The 2011 census recorded the population of the Hooton built-up area as 385.

== History ==
The name Hooton means "hill-spur farm/settlement" and likely derives from the Old English words hōh (s sharply projecting tract of land) and tūn (a farmstead or settlement).

In 1070 William the Conqueror granted the lands of Hooton to Adam de Aldithly. The village is mentioned in the Domesday Book as Hotone in the hundred of Wilaveston (later called the Wirral Hundred) under the ownership of Richard de Vernon and consisting of nine households (one villager, four smallholders and four 'riders'). Eventually the lands passed to the Stanley family through a series of marriages. After the Battle of Bosworth, Hooton had a new hall and the first Lord Derby in Lancashire.

Sir William Stanley obtained a licence to crenellate in 1487 but built a half timbered manor house in 1488 which survived until 1788 when it was demolished. The old house was replaced by a mansion called Hooton Hall, built from local stone from the quarries at Storeton. It was designed by the architect James Wyatt in the Italian Palladian style for the fifth Baronet, Sir William Stanley. The family sold the estate in the nineteenth century after Sir Massey Stanley had gone bankrupt due to his high living. The construction of the Manchester Ship Canal nearby contributed to the last private owner, Richard Naylor, abandoning it as a place of residence. The empty hall was requisitioned at the outbreak of the First World War and used as a military hospital and officer's mess, with barracks erected in the grounds. Hooton Hall was demolished due to neglect in 1932. Part of the building's façade was reconstructed as 'The Gloriette' at the tourist village of Portmeirion in North Wales.

In 1917 RAF Hooton Park airfield was built with three double Belfast Hangars to train pilots for World War I from Canada and the United States. The Second World War saw the airfield utilised as a military base, and three RAF auxiliary squadrons were based there until disbandment in 1957. Much of the airfield (including the site of the Hall) was transformed in 1962 into a factory for Vauxhall Motors which as of 2026 is home to the Vauxhall Astra range of cars. In 1990 the former RAF base was leased by Vauxhall to a charity called The Griffin Trust which managed the site until 2000 when The Hooton Park Trust was formed and tasked with restoring the Grade II* listed hangars and now operates an aviation museum on the site, Hooton Park Hangars.

Hooton was once a township and chapelry in the parish of Eastham in the Wirral Hundred, becoming a separate civil parish in 1866. It was administered as part of Wirral Rural District until 1933 when it was transferred to Ellesmere Port Urban District. The civil parish was abolished on 1 April 1950 and the area subsumed into Ellesmere Port. The population was 91 in 1801, 110 in 1851 and stood at 200 by 1901. In 1931 the parish had a population of 246.

== Geography ==
Hooton is in the southern part of the Wirral Peninsula, lying within a green belt area bordering Merseyside and Cheshire. It is near to the town of Ellesmere Port and is a short distance away from the villages of Eastham and Willaston.

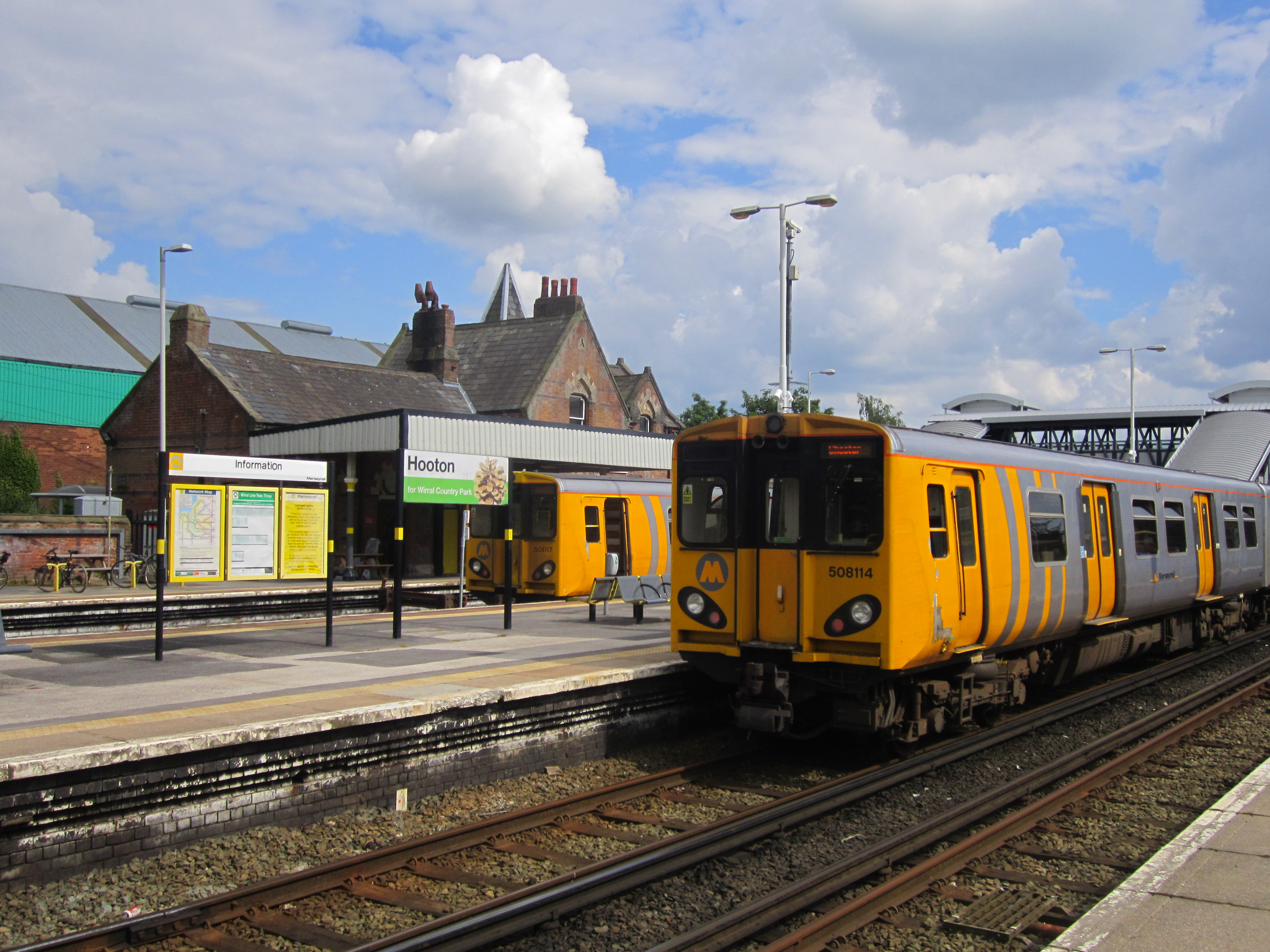
Hooton railway station

== Transport ==
Hooton railway station lies on the Wirral line of the Merseyrail network, with frequent trains to Liverpool, Chester and Ellesmere Port. The station provides an extensive park and ride facility. Immediately south of the station is the junction of the lines to Chester and Ellesmere Port. The trackbed of the former GWR/LM&SR Joint branch line from Hooton to West Kirby now forms the Wirral Country Park.

Hooton is to the south of junction 5 of the M53 motorway. The A41 trunk road between Birkenhead and Chester passes through the area, with the A550 road diverging from it towards North Wales.

== Notable people ==
- John Owen (1827 in Marchington – 1901 in Twickenham) an English vicar and strong amateur chess master. He was vicar of Hooton, from 1862 to his retirement in 1900. He played chess in British tournaments into the 1890s and performed strongly in several matches against top British players, who were essentially chess professionals.
- John Kebty-Fletcher (1869–1918) a British Conservative politician. MP for Altrincham 1910–1913, when he resigned causing a by-election. In 1912 his address was given as "The Paddock", Hooton, Cheshire.
- Sir Herbert Williams, 1st Baronet (1884 in Hooton – 1954) a British politician and Conservative MP for Croydon South 1932–1945; grandfather of Fiona Mactaggart Labour MP for Slough 1997–2017.
- Sir Doug Ellis OBE (1924 in Hooton - 2018) an entrepreneur who pioneered package holidays to Spain and former chairman of Aston Villa F.C.

== See also ==
- Listed buildings in Hooton, Cheshire
