= Church of St Mary of the Angels, Hooton =

Coordinates: 53.2972°N 2.9573°W

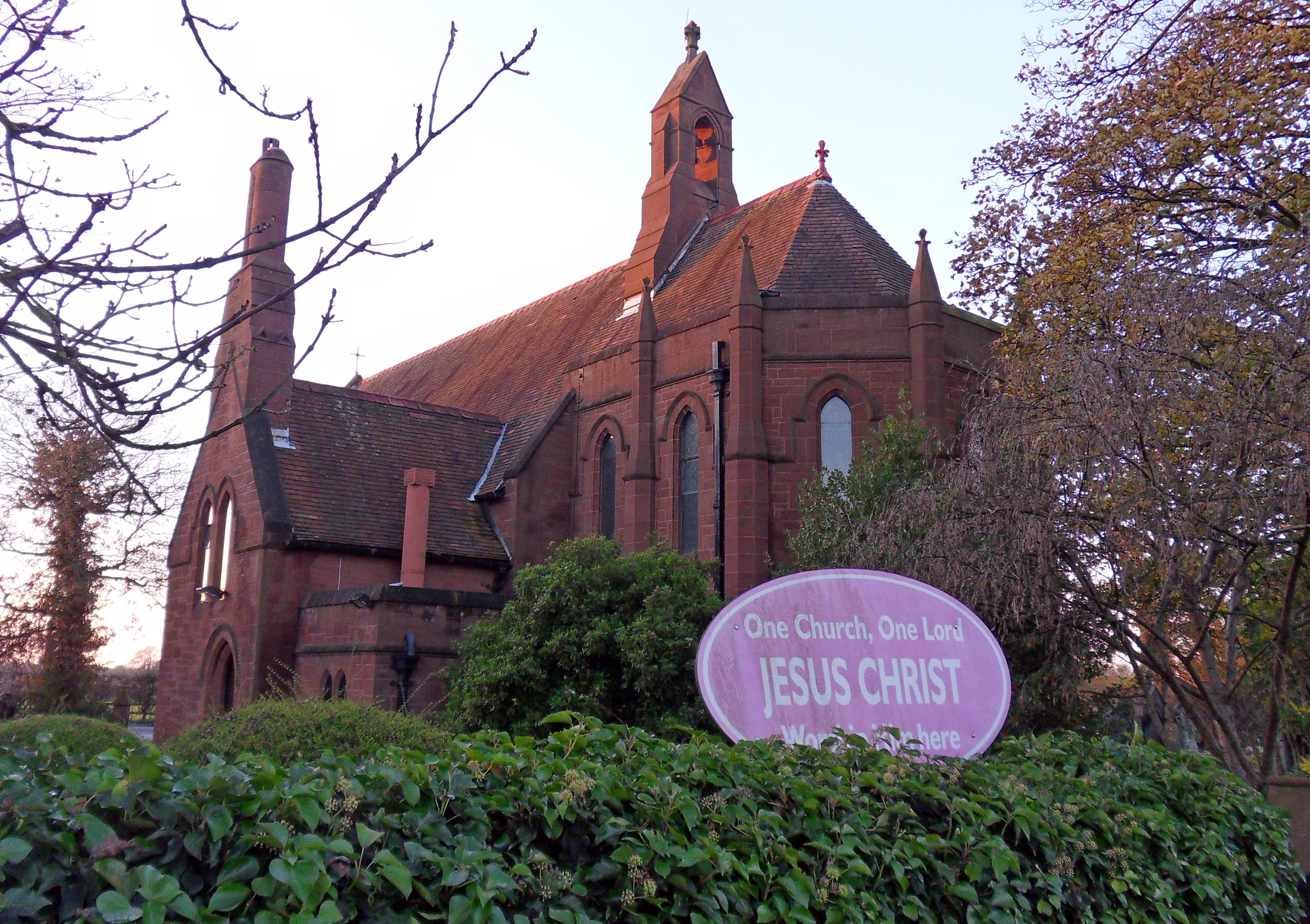
- Church of St Mary of the Angels, Hooton, from the southeast

- Location in Cheshire
- OS grid reference: SJ 363 782
- Location: Welsh Road, Hooton, Cheshire
- Country: England
- Denomination: Roman Catholic
- Website: St Mary's, Hooton

History
- Status: Parish church

Architecture
- Functional status: active
- Heritage designation: Grade II
- Designated: 17 May 1985
- Architect: E. J. Torver
- Architectural type: Church
- Groundbreaking: 1878
- Completed: 1879

Specifications
- Materials: Sandstone

Administration
- Diocese: Roman Catholic Diocese of Shrewsbury

Clergy
- Priest: Peter Phillips

The Church of St Mary of the Angels is in Welsh Road, Hooton, Cheshire, England. It is an active Roman Catholic parish church in the diocese of Shrewsbury. The church is recorded in the National Heritage List for England as a designated Grade II listed building. The authors of the Buildings of England series state that it is "an individual design".

== History ==
The foundation stone of the church was laid on 24 March 1878, and the church was formally opened on 22 August 1879 by Edmund Knight, Roman Catholic Bishop of Shrewsbury. Its architect was E. J. Torver. It was consecrated on 10 June 1883 by Arthur Riddell, Bishop of Northampton, due to the indisposition of Knight.

== Architecture ==
The church is constructed in red sandstone. Its plan consists of a nave, a west porch, a chancel with a polygonal apse, a north chapel, also with an apse, and a vestry acting as a sacristy. On the ridge of the church is a bellcote. The porch contains panels depicting the symbols of the Evangelists. At the west end of the church is a rose window. Windows contain stained glass by Mayer of Munich.

== External features ==
The churchyard contains the war grave of a Royal Air Force officer of World War I.

== See also ==
- Listed buildings in Hooton, Cheshire
