= William Cunliffe Brooks =

British politician (1819–1900)

Sir William Cunliffe Brooks Bt DL JP
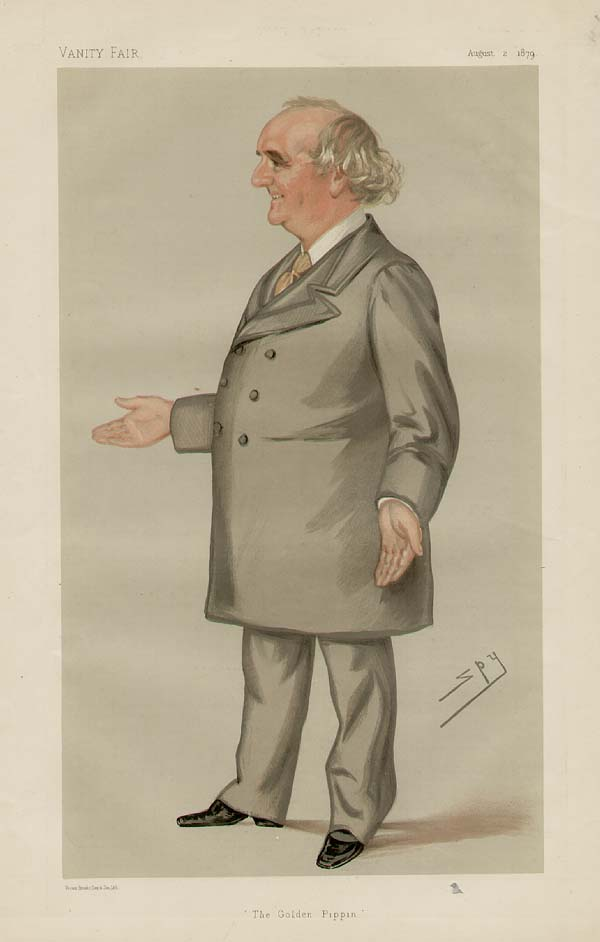
- "The Golden Pippen". Caricature by Spy published in Vanity Fair in 1879.
- Born: 30 September 1819
- Died: 9 June 1900 (aged 80); Glen Tanar, Aboyne, Aberdeenshire
- Education: Rugby; St John's College, Cambridge; Inner Temple
- Occupations: Barrister; Banker; Politician
- Spouse: Jane Elizabeth Orrell

Sir William Cunliffe Brooks, 1st Baronet, DL JP (30 September 1819 – 9 June 1900) was an English barrister, banker and Conservative politician who sat in the House of Commons between 1869 and 1892.

== Life ==
Brooks was the son of Samuel Brooks, a banker of Manchester and his wife Margaret Hall daughter of Thomas Hall. After his education at Rugby and St John's College, Cambridge he was called to the Bar at Inner Temple in 1847. He went on the Northern Circuit until the death of his father in 1864 when he became sole partner of Cunliffe Brooks and Co, Manchester. He opened Brooks and Co., 81 Lombard Street, London. He was a J.P. for Lancashire, Cheshire and Manchester, and deputy lieutenant for Lancashire and Aberdeen. His main residence for most of that time was the historic Barlow Hall, Chorlton-cum-Hardy.

In 1869 Brooks was elected at a by-election as a Conservative Member of Parliament (MP) for East Cheshire. He held the seat until it was divided under the Redistribution of Seats Act 1885, and at the 1885 general election he unsuccessfully contested the new Macclesfield division. The baronetcy was conferred on him on 4 March 1886. At the 1886 election he was elected as MP for Altrincham, holding the seat until he stood down at the 1892 general election.

Escutcheon of the Brooks baronets of Manchester

Brooks was a notable benefactor to Sale, Cheshire; Hale, Greater Manchester; and Chorlton-cum-Hardy. He was elected to membership of the Manchester Literary and Philosophical Society on 23 January 1844,

He had a major influence on the estate of Glen Tanar, near Aboyne in Aberdeenshire. At first he leased the estate from Charles Gordon, 11th Marquess of Huntly, who married his elder daughter. He then bought the estate in 1890. Brooks lavished money on Glen Tanar, building a large house, cottages for estate workers, a school, stables and kennels. He also installed numerous carved stones and memorials in the surrounding countryside, many of which make playful references to his name or celebrate the virtues of drinking water rather than alcohol.

Brooks died at Glen Tana (as he preferred to spell the name) at the age of 80.

== Family ==
Brooks married Jane Elizabeth Orrell, daughter of Ralph Orrell in 1842. They had no sons but two daughters (other children died in infancy). Their elder daughter, Amy, married Charles Gordon, 11th Marquess of Huntly. Their second daughter, Edith, married Lord Francis Horace Pierrepont Cecil, second son of William Cecil, 3rd Marquess of Exeter. They have many descendants in both England and America, including Sir James Cockburn, Lady Ethel Cecil, Diana Lewis and Isabella Overington.

After the death of his wife, in 1879 Brooks married secondly Jane Davidson (1852-1946), daughter of Lieutenant Colonel David Davidson KCB of Haddington, East Lothian.

Parliament of the United Kingdom
Preceded by Edward Egerton; William Legh	Member of Parliament for East Cheshire; 1869–1885; With: William Legh	Constituency abolished
Preceded by John Brooks	Member of Parliament for Altrincham; 1886–1892	Succeeded by Coningsby Disraeli
Baronetage of the United Kingdom
New creation	Baronet (of Manchester); 1886–1900	Extinct
Preceded by Stephen baronets	Brooks baronets of Manchester; 4 March 1886	Succeeded by Green baronets
Professional and academic associations
Preceded by The Earl of Crawford	President of the Lancashire and Cheshire Antiquarian Society; 1889–92	Succeeded by The Duke of Devonshire
