= William Brooks of Blackburn =

William Brooks (1762–1846) was a supplier of cotton to spinners around Whalley and Blackburn.

He was the son of John Brooks of Waddington, Lancashire.

He went into partnership with Roger Cunliffe, of the Cunliffe family of Great Harwood, who had been mercers since Elizabethan times. At first cotton manufacturing was the main activity, but in 1792 they founded Cunliffe Brooks Bank at Blackburn. On Brooks' death in 1846 the bank moved its head office to Manchester.

He had married Sarah Greenall, the daughter of Richard Greenall They had three sons, including John and Samuel and a daughter, Nancy. They lived near Whalley, Lancashire.

== Sources ==
- Sayers, R S: Lloyds Bank in the History of English Banking, OUP 1957, page 331.
- Brackenbury, Allan: The Road from Brooklands Station, Journal of the Railway and Canal History Society, Vol 31, Pt 4, No. 156, pp 170–174 (Nov 1993)
