= Junior Naval and Military Club =

Gentlemen's club in London, England (1870–1940)

Coordinates: 51°30′31.43″N 0°8′33.31″W

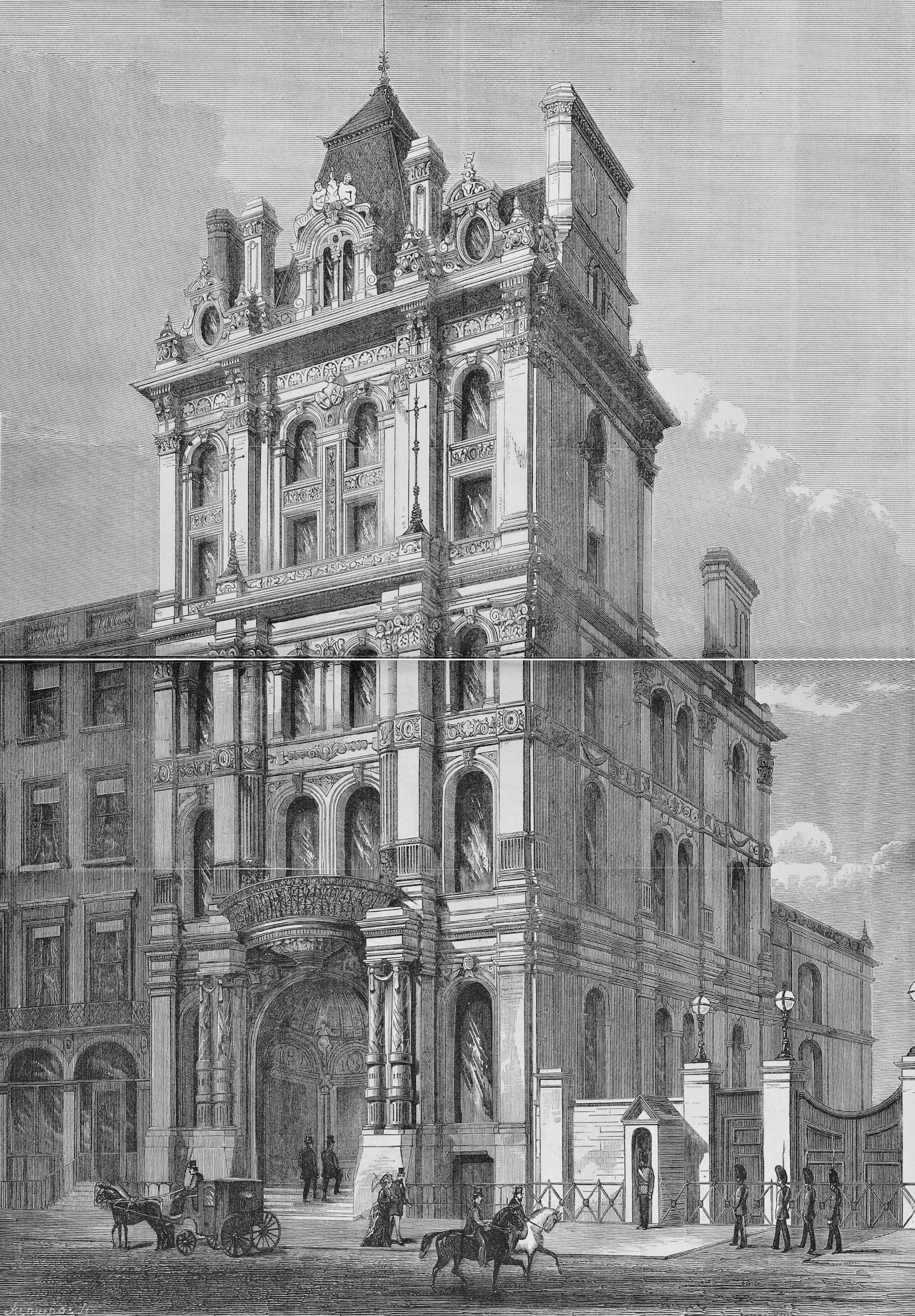
The 1875 clubhouse at 66-68 Pall Mall, designed by Thomas Dudley

The Junior Naval and Military Club was a gentlemen's club in London, England that existed from 1870 and 1879, and then was revived and existed again from 1899 to 1940. In 1940, it merged into the Naval and Military Club.

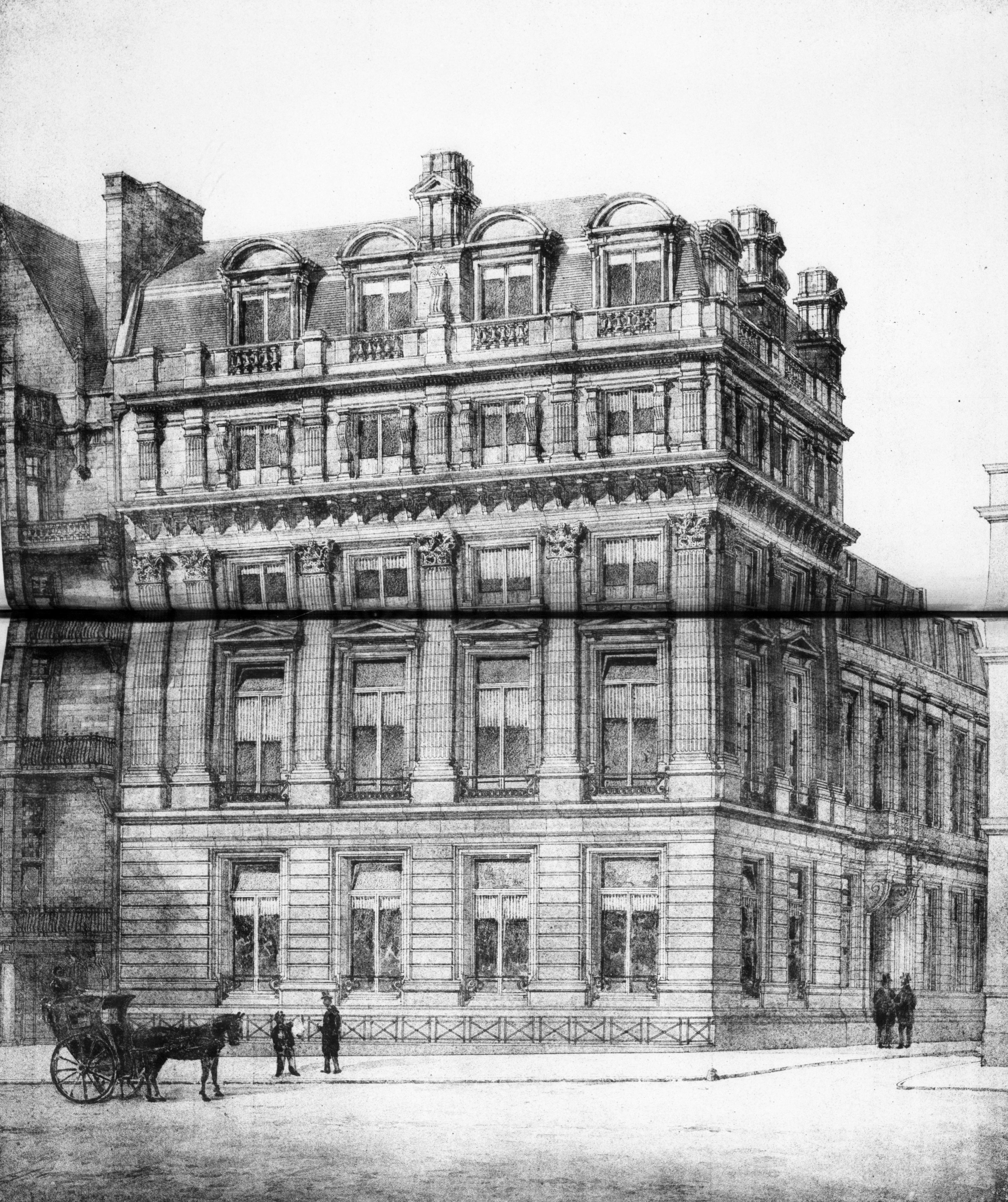
From 1899 to 1940 the club used the former New Travellers Club at 96-97 Piccadilly, designed in 1892 by Thomas Verity and Frank Verity

It was a proprietary club founded by one Captain John Elliott, in response to the heavy over-subscription of existing clubs for servicemen, such as the Naval and Military Club and the Army and Navy Club. The club opened its doors in August 1870, in temporary premises at 19 Dover Street, and by June of the following year, it already had some 270 members, and its patrons and honorary members included the Prince of Wales, Prince Alfred, Duke of Edinburgh, the French Emperor Napoleon III, and the latter's son Louis Napoléon, Prince Imperial.

Meanwhile, a sumptuous clubhouse was erected at 66-68 Pall Mall during 1874–5, being ready by the end of 1875. However, the lavish scale of the construction appears to have ruined the club's owner, with bankruptcy proceedings pending in June 1878. By the following year, the club had closed.

Subsequent occupants of the Pall Mall building seem to have been dogged by misfortune - the tenure of both the Beaconsfield Club (1880–1887) and the Unionist Club (1888–1892) were to be short-lived.

== See also ==
- List of London's gentlemen's clubs
