= Listed buildings in Hooton, Cheshire =

Hooton is a village in Cheshire West and Chester, England. It contains twelve listed buildings that are recorded in the National Heritage List for England. Of these, five are listed at Grade II*, the middle of the three grades, and the others are at Grade II, the lowest grade. Near to the village is the former RAF Hooton Park, and six of the listed buildings are part of this. The other listed buildings are houses, two churches, a war memorial, and the entrance lodge to a former country house.

== Key ==
Grade	Criteria
II*	Particularly important buildings of more than special interest
II	Buildings of national importance and special interest

== Buildings ==
Name and location	Photograph	Date	Notes	Grade
Hooton Lodge, screen wall and gates 53.29010°N 2.95092°W		c.1788	A pair of lodges with walls and gates at the entrance to Hooton Hall (now demolished), almost certainly designed by Samuel Wyatt. The stone lodges are mirror-images, with a single storey and containing one room. Each has a lead-covered dome, and above the windows and blank recesses are ornamental panels. Between the lodges are curving Ionic screen walls. The gates are in wrought iron.	II*
1 and 2 Hooton Green; 53.30036°N 2.95518°W	—	Early 19th century	A pair of houses in brick with slate roofs. There are two storeys, a double depth plan, and a front of two bays. No. 1 has a rear outshut, and No. 2 has a wing. On the front there are two Gothic-style windows in each floor, with cast iron casements containing interlace tracery.	II
3 and 4 Hooton Green; 53.30042°N 2.95478°W	—	Early 19th century	A pair of houses in brick with slate roofs. There are two storeys, a double depth plan, a front of two bays, and rear outshuts. On the front there are two Gothic-style windows in each floor, with cast iron casements containing interlace tracery.	II
St Paul's Church; 53.29059°N 2.95093°W		1858–62	A Church of England church designed by James K. Colling, it is in red and white sandstone with slate roofs. The church consists of a nave with a clerestory, aisles, transepts, a tower at the crossing, and an apsidal chancel with aisles continuing as an ambulatory. To the north of the chancel is a vestry and to the south is a former private entrance with a truncated pyramidal roof. The tower is octagonal, it has a dentilled cornice, and is surmounted by a short polygonal spire. At the west end is a gabled porch above which is a large wheel window. At the entrance to the churchyard are low sandstone walls with flat-topped pyramidal copings, and wrought iron gates with piers with chamfered corners stepped pyramidal caps and iron finials.	II*
Church of St Mary of the Angels; 53.29729°N 2.95734°W		1879	A Roman Catholic church designed by E. J. Tarver. It is in sandstone, and consists of a narthex, a nave, a chancel with a polygonal apse, a chapel, also with an apse, and a vestry and sacristy. On the ridge is an open bellcote, and at the west end is a rose window.	II
Southern General Service Hangar (Hangar 1), RAF Hooton Park; 53.30230°N 2.94207°W	—	1917	The hangar was built for the Royal Flying Corps. It is in red brick with a bitumen-felted roof. The hangar is in a single storey and has a twin range of 16 bays, with workshops at the side. Inside, the bays are divided by a wooden-latticed Belfast trusses, and there is a central arcade of twin brick piers with segmental arches.	II*
Central General Service Hangar (Hangar 2), RAF Hooton Park; 53.30292°N 2.94273°W		1917	The hangar was built for the Royal Flying Corps. It is in red brick with a bitumen-felted roof. The hangar is in a single storey and has a twin range of 16 bays, with workshops at the side. Inside, the bays are divided by a wooden-latticed Belfast trusses, and there is a central arcade of twin brick piers with segmental arches.	II*
Northern General Service Hangar (Hangar 3), RAF Hooton Park; 53.30362°N 2.94337°W	—	1917	The hangar was built for the Royal Flying Corps. It is in red brick with a bitumen-felted roof. The hangar is in a single storey and has a twin range of 16 bays, with workshops at the side. Inside, the bays are divided by a wooden-latticed Belfast trusses, and there is a central arcade of twin brick piers with segmental arches. In 2011 the roof collapsed and was lost due to the weight of snow on it.	II*
Building 27, RAF Hooton Park; 53.30272°N 2.94336°W	—	1917	A workshop built for the Royal Flying Corps, it is in rendered brick with a corrugated iron roof. The workshop has a rectangular plan and an aisle at the south end, and contains steel windows and timber doors. On the ridge are ventilators and glazing, and inside are Belfast trusses.	II
Building 42, RAF Hooton Park; 53.30249°N 2.94358°W	—	1917	A workshop built for the Royal Flying Corps, it is in rendered brick with a resin and fibre-glass coated timber plank roof. The workshop has a rectangular plan and five bays divided by brick piers. Inside are wooden-latticed Belfast trusses.	II
Motor Transport Sheds, RAF Hooton Park; 53.30189°N 2.94303°W	—	1917	A pair of sheds built for the Royal Flying Corps in rendered brick with metal sheet roofs. Each has a rectangular plan with 13 bays, and with workshops in an outshut. The bays are divided by brick piers.	II
War memorial 53.29004°N 2.95109°W		1920	The war memorial is in Portland stone, its design based on the Cross of Sacrifice by Reginald Blomfield. It consists of a Latin cross with an octagonal shaft on an octagonal plinth with a base of two octagonal steps. A reversed sword is carved in relief on the front of the cross. The plinth has a carved inscription and the names of those lost in both World Wars and later conflicts.	II

== See also ==
- Listed buildings in Ellesmere Port
- Listed buildings in Ledsham
- Listed buildings in Willaston
