= 1869 East Cheshire by-election =

UK parliamentary by-election

The 1869 East Cheshire by-election was fought on 6 October 1869. The by-election was fought due to the death of the incumbent MP of the Conservative Party, Edward Christopher Egerton. It was won by the Conservative candidate William Cunliffe Brooks.
