= Sir George Hamilton, 1st Baronet, of Ilford =

English electrical engineer and Conservative politician (1877–1947)

Sir George Hamilton Bt
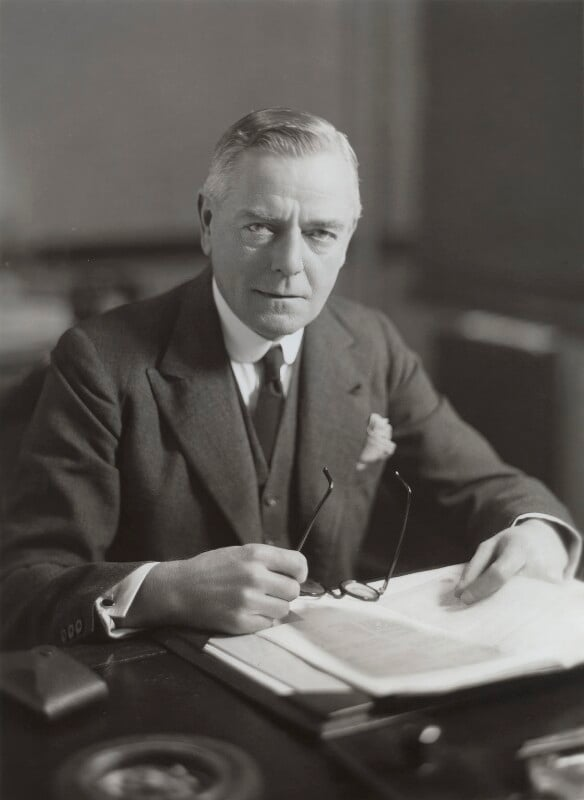
- Hamilton in 1936

Member of Parliament for Altrincham
- In office 1913–1923
- Preceded by: John Kebty-Fletcher
- Succeeded by: Robert Alstead

Member of Parliament for Ilford
- In office 1928–1937
- Preceded by: Fredric Wise
- Succeeded by: Geoffrey Clegg Hutchinson

Personal details
- Born: Northumberland, England
- Party: Conservative, Unionist

Sir Collingwood George Clements Hamilton, 1st Baronet (1 November 1877 – 12 January 1947) was an English electrical engineer and Conservative Party politician.

Born in Northumberland, he was the son of a prominent Church of England cleric, the Venerable George Hans Hamilton, Archdeacon of Lindisfarne then Northumberland, Canon of Durham and his wife Lady Louisa Hamilton.

== Early career and family ==
Following education at Aysgarth School and Charterhouse School, he was apprenticed to the firm of Scott & Mountain Ltd, a Newcastle-based electrical and general engineering company. He represented the company in various countries including India, Bulgaria, Greece, Russia and Egypt. He subsequently became the managing director of the Manchester branch of Drake & Gorham, electrical engineers.

He married Eleanor Simon of Didsbury in 1906, and they had one son and one daughter.

== War service ==
During World War I he was commissioned as an officer in the Queen's Westminster Rifles, the 16th Battalion of the London Regiment, rising to the rank of major. In October 1916 he was transferred to the General List. He was appointed Director of Enrolment National Service in 1917 and Controller of Contract Claims at the Ministry of Munitions in 1918.

== Political career ==
From 1910 to 1913 he was a councillor on the Knutsford Urban District Council.

In 1913 he won a by-election and was elected to the Commons as Conservative Member of Parliament (MP) for Altrincham. He served as Parliamentary Private Secretary to the Minister of Pensions from 1919 to 1920. He held the seat until 1923. He returned to parliament at another by-election at Ilford in 1928. He resigned from the House of Commons in 1937.

He was knighted in 1922 Birthday Honours, and made a baronet in the 1937 Coronation Honours "for political and public services".

== Later life ==
Hamilton moved to Cransford Hall, near Saxmundham in Suffolk. He became a member of East Suffolk County Council, and was chairman of two companies: the Expanded Metal Company and the National Group of Fixed Trusts.

He died at Cransford in January 1947, aged 69.

Parliament of the United Kingdom
Preceded by John Kebty-Fletcher	Member of Parliament for Altrincham; 1913–1923	Succeeded by Robert Alstead
Preceded by Sir Fredric Wise	Member of Parliament for Ilford; 1928–1937	Succeeded by Geoffrey Hutchinson
Baronetage of the United Kingdom
New creation	Baronet of Ilford, Essex; 1937–1947	Succeeded by Patrick George Hamilton
