= Robert Alstead =

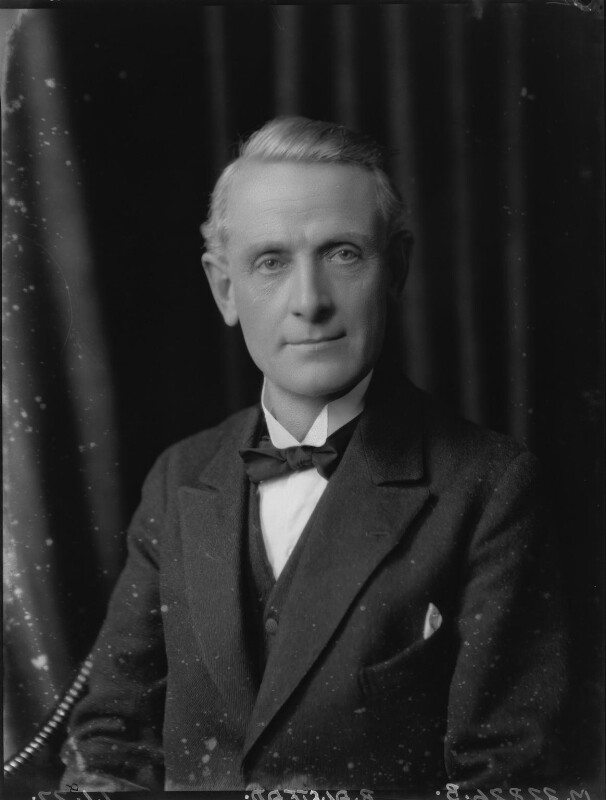
Robert Alstead

Robert Alstead OBE JP (23 October 1873 – 9 September 1946) was a self-made businessman in the clothing trade and a Liberal Party politician in the United Kingdom.

== Family and education ==
Alstead was born in Upholland, Lancashire, the son of a joiner and carpenter. He was educated at Wigan Elementary School and Wigan Mining Technical College. In 1896, he married Sarah Ann Deakin of Wigan. He and his wife had 7 children, 6 boys and a girl.

== Career ==
Alstead started life as a newsboy on a railway book stall at the age of 10. He became a self-made businessman. He was a sauce and pickle manufacturer in the 1890s, then moved into the clothing trade, eventually owning a chain of shops tailoring for men in the Wigan area and founding Robert Alstead, Ltd, woollen manufacturers and clothing manufacturers.

== Politics ==
=== Local politics ===
Alstead was an elected member of Wigan Town Council from 1913 to 1929 and was Mayor of Wigan in 1926–27. He was a governor of Wigan Grammar School and a governor of the Wigan Mining Technical College between 1913 and 1932. He also served as a Justice of the Peace.

=== Parliament ===
Alstead unsuccessfully contested the Wigan parliamentary constituency at the 1918 general election.

He next contested Altrincham in Cheshire at the 1922 general election. The Liberals had not contested Altrincham at the previous election in 1918 when a Labour candidate challenged the sitting Unionist. Despite this disadvantage, Alstead was easily able to push the Labour candidate into third place;

General election 1922 Electorate 45,085
Party	Candidate	Votes	%	±%
Unionist	Sir Collingwood George Clements Hamilton	19,361	53.8	−18.9
Liberal	Robert Alstead	11,692	32.5	n/a
Labour	George Benson	4,930	13.7	−13.6
Majority		7,669	21.3	n/a
Turnout		35,983	79.8	+11.3
Unionist hold		Swing	n/a	

Another General Election took place a year later, fought on the issue of Free trade v Protectionism. Across the country there was a swing away from the Unionists and in Altrincham this helped Alstead, as the only challenger, to take the seat. He was the first Liberal to win Altrincham since January 1910.

General election 1923 Electorate 45,871
Party	Candidate	Votes	%	±%
Liberal	Robert Alstead	19,046	54.2	+21.7
Unionist	Sir Collingwood George Clements Hamilton	16,081	45.8	−8.0
Majority		2,965	8.4	29.7
Turnout		35,127	76.6	−3.2
Liberal gain from Unionist		Swing	+14.9	

With only a Labour minority government in office, another General Election was called a year later. With the Unionists regaining ground across the country, Alstead was defeated at Altrincham.

General election 1924 Electorate 47,253
Party	Candidate	Votes	%	±%
Unionist	Cyril Atkinson	24,439	61.0	+15.2
Liberal	Robert Alstead	15,654	39.0	−15.2
Majority		8,785	22.0	30.4
Turnout		40,093	84.8	+8.2
Unionist gain from Liberal		Swing	+15.2	

After 4 years of Unionist majority government which included a General Strike, the Liberal Party, now led by David Lloyd George, were challenging strongly again and Alstead had hopes of regaining Altrincham. However, this time, Alstead faced a Labour candidate as well as a Unionist, making winning the seat too difficult.

General election 1929 Electorate 69,607
Party	Candidate	Votes	%	±%
Unionist	Cyril Atkinson	28,512	50.7	−10.3
Liberal	Robert Alstead	18,475	32.9	−6.1
Labour	Alfred James Dobbs	9,242	16.4	n/a
Majority		10,037	17.8	−4.2
Turnout		56,229	80.8	−4.0
Unionist hold		Swing	-2.1	

He did not contest the 1931 general election, when Atkinson was returned unopposed as a supporter of the National Government. Alstead did not stand for Parliament again, although he was prospective Liberal candidate for Preston in 1934–1935, but pulled out the month before the 1935 election.

== Honours ==
He received the Order of the British Empire in the 1939 New Year's Honours List.

== Death ==
Alstead died at Gathurst, near Wigan, on 9 September 1946, aged 72 years.

Parliament of the United Kingdom
Preceded by Sir George Clements Hamilton	Member of Parliament for Altrincham; 1923 – 1924	Succeeded by Cyril Atkinson
