= W8 Wellingborough–Bozeat =

Bus service in England

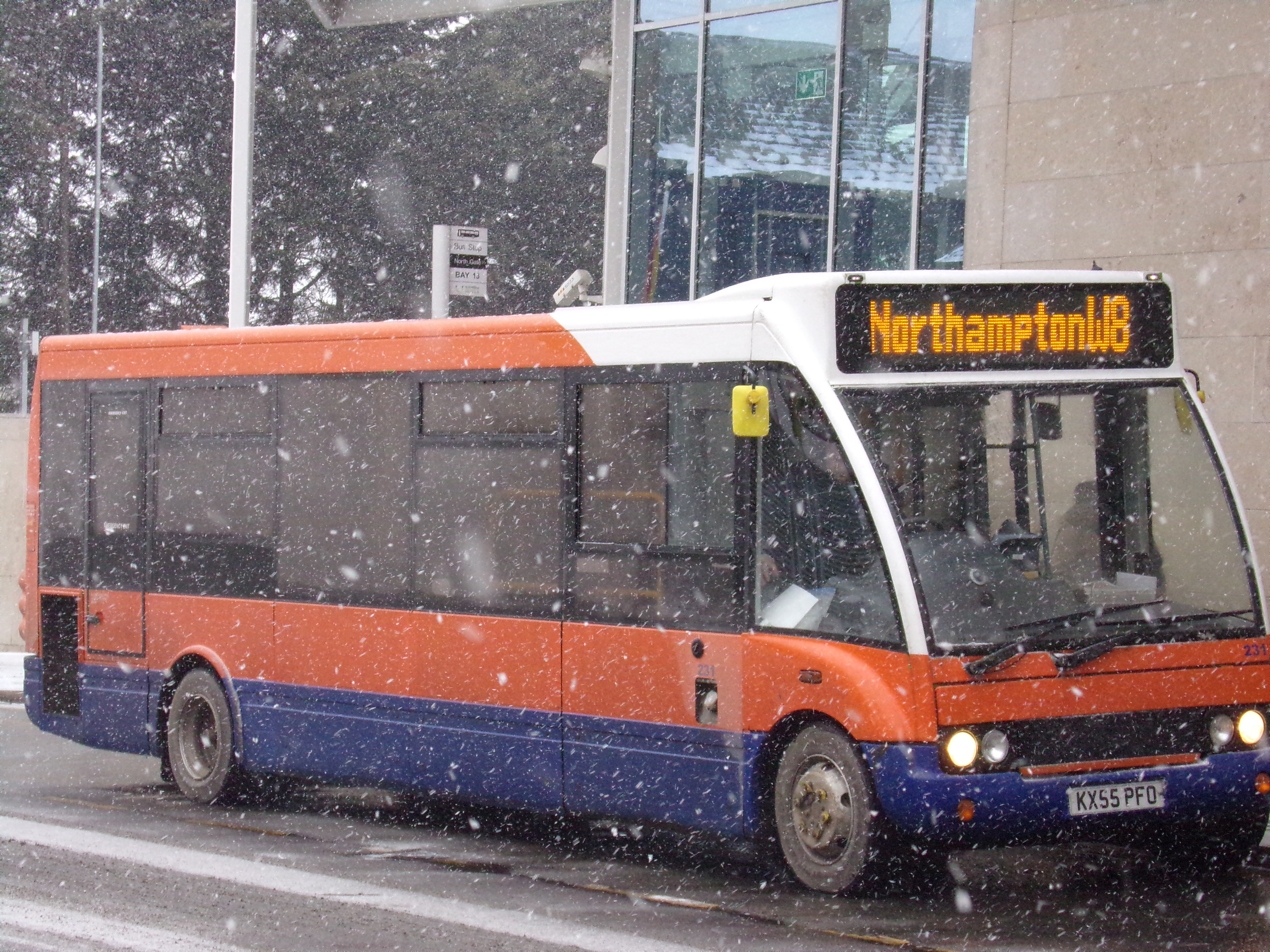
A bus operating the route in 2018

Service W8 is a bus service which operates between Wellingborough and Bozeat via Wollaston.

== History ==
The bus route was operated by Stagecoach in the past prior to being taken over by Centrebus. Following a decision by Northamptonshire County Council to cancel all bus route subsidies, then-operator Centrebus stated that the W8 route would be cut as a result. In November 2019, the service transferred from Centrebus to Grant Palmer. The company had informed the council that the route was no longer viable due to financial pressure and a driver shortage. The council subsequently decided to spend £14,000 on subsidising the route until April 2022. On 8 November 2021, the service transferred from Grant Palmer to Stagecoach East Midlands.

== Usage ==
In 2018 it was estimated that around 30 people used the route. It currently runs at an hourly frequency.
