= Cyril Atkinson =

English barrister and politician (1874–1967)

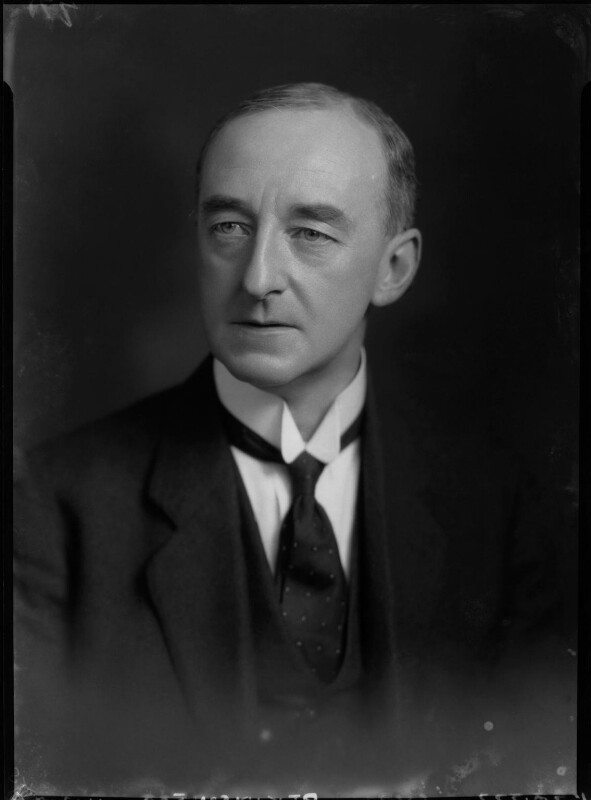
- Atkinson in 1926

Member of Parliament for Altrincham
- In office 1924 – 1933
- Monarch: George V
- Prime Minister: Stanley Baldwin; Ramsay MacDonald
- Preceded by: Robert Alstead
- Succeeded by: Edward Grigg
- Majority: 24,439 (61%)

Personal details
- Born: 9 May 1874
- Died: 29 January 1967 (aged 92)
- Party: Conservative
- Spouses: Kathleen O'Neill Longridge (m. 1900; died 1947) Florence Morton Henderson (m. 1948)
- Children: Fenton Atkinson (son)
- Occupation: Barrister, politician

Sir Cyril Atkinson (9 May 1874 – 29 January 1967) was an English barrister, Conservative Party politician, and judge. He served as Member of Parliament (MP) for Altrincham in Cheshire from 1924 to 1933, when he resigned to become a High Court judge.

== Private life ==
Atkinson was the son of Leonard William Atkinson, from Cheshire. He married Kathleen O'Neill Longridge in 1900. Their son Fenton Atkinson was born in 1906; he was later a judge in the High Court and then the Court of Appeal.

After his first wife's death in 1947, Atkinson married Florence Morton Henderson in 1948; she was the widow of Colonel Michael Henderson.

== Career ==
Atkinson was called to the Bar in 1897 and was appointed King's Counsel in 1913.

In 1924, Atkinson was chosen by Altrincham Unionists to be their parliamentary candidate for the seat they had lost to the Liberals in 1923. He did not have long to wait before the 1924 general election, and he won the seat on a swing of 15%.

At the 1929 general election, he again faced Robert Alstead, the Liberal he had unseated in 1924. The Labour party chose to field a candidate for the first time since 1922, which made Atkinson's job of holding the seat easier, giving him a majority of 18%.

He was returned unopposed in 1931, and in 1933 he resigned from the House of Commons on being appointed a High Court judge, serving in the King's Bench Division until he retired in 1948. He was Treasurer of Lincoln's Inn in 1942.

He served as a member of the Church Assembly (the forerunner to the General Synod) from 1950 to 1955.

== Trial of Udham Singh ==
In June 1940, Atkinson presided over the Central Criminal Court trial of Indian revolutionary Udham Singh, who was charged with the assassination of Michael O'Dwyer.

During the pre-sentencing phase, when Singh began reading a prepared speech condemning British imperialism, Atkinson interrupted the statement, declaring he would not listen to a "political speech." Following an explicit reminder from the Crown prosecution regarding wartime powers, Atkinson invoked the Emergency Powers (Defence) Act 1939 to enforce an in-camera publication ban, verbally ordering the press gallery: "I give a direction to the Press not to report any of the statement made by the accused in the dock." As a result of this judicial order, the full transcript of Singh's final address was legally suppressed from public view for 56 years until the Home Office files were declassified in 1996.

== Arms ==
Coat of arms of Cyril Atkinson
Motto Nil Sine Laborare

Parliament of the United Kingdom
Preceded by Robert Alstead	Member of Parliament for Altrincham; 1924–1933	Succeeded by Edward Grigg
