= Samuel Brooks (cotton manufacturer) =

British banker

Samuel Brooks (12 August 1793 – 7 June 1864) was an English cotton manufacturer and banker.

== Life ==
He was born at Great Harwood, near Whalley, Lancashire, England, the second son of William Brooks. In 1815 he became a partner in his father’s Blackburn-based business, Cunliffe Brooks & Co. This business supplied cotton and/or textile equipment, and also ran a bank as a sideline. Around 1819 his father set up Samuel and his two brothers as junior partners in three separate firms of calico printers in Manchester. Samuel opened a small branch of his father's bank in a corner of his warehouse. Gradually, banking became his principal activity, and in 1826 the bank moved to its own premises. It soon became established as one of Manchester’s leading banks. In 1900 it was absorbed by Lloyd's Bank to provide them with a presence in the Manchester area. Like several other Manchester bankers he was elected to membership of the Manchester Literary and Philosophical Society, in his case on 24 January 1823

Subsequently Brooks established the first housing developments in Whalley Range (which he named) and Brooklands (which acquired its name from common usage).

Brooks died in 1864. He had married Margaret Hall, daughter of Thomas Hall, and had a son William, who became an MP and was made a baronet.

== Manchester and Leeds Railway ==
In 1830, Brooks chaired the first meeting of the promoters of the Manchester and Leeds Railway (M&LR). Subsequently, he became its first deputy chairman.

Initially the M&LR placed its Manchester terminus at Oldham Road but they had a firm plan to establish a station more centrally. Samuel Brooks had purchased land at Hunt's Bank and in August 1838 he informed the board that "...if you require any portion of that land, you shall have it on reasonable terms". He went on to pledge that the company would not be prejudiced by his holding the land, and that he had offers in hand but would not sell until he knew the board's intentions. The board gratefully accepted this offer, and thus the company were able to build Manchester Victoria station a few years later.

== Whalley Range ==
In 1836 he bought Jackson’s Moss, a swampy area south of the city centre. He drained it and built villas for wealthy businessmen such as himself. The house he built for himself was named Whalley House and the area acquired the name Whalley Range, probably after his boyhood home. Tollbars guarded this exclusive area and the site of one of them is still called "Brooks’s Bar" though simplified in local pronunciation to Brooks' Bar (with long "oo").

== Brooklands ==
In 1856, Samuel bought a large area of land in North Cheshire from the Earl of Stamford and made further purchases later. He enhanced its value by draining, scrub clearance and tree planting. The area was crossed by the Manchester, South Junction and Altrincham Railway, opened in 1849. His son William continued to purchase and develop the area until the estate stretched from Davenport Green to Warburton Green and included much of Hale Barns and of what soon became known as Brooklands.

=== Railway station ===
A road crossed this railway between Sale and Timperley stations, and in 1855, 45 residents petitioned for a station there. The company took no action but in 1859, Brooks negotiated terms for a station. He offered an acre of land for £200, and guaranteed to pay the company £300 if annual receipts had not reached £100 after five years. The unofficial name "Brooks’s land" soon became Brooklands, and the station so named opened there on 1 December 1859. Annual receipts reached £100 after two years.

=== Private road (Brooklands Road etc.) ===
As at Whalley Range, so at Brooklands he built a private road in 1862 with land available for superior residences. This road was four miles long and led to the station. It was wide and tree lined, with a sound stone foundation. From Brooklands station it led straight in a south-easterly direction for 2 ½ miles; this part is called Brooklands Road on the 1872 six-inch map. It crossed the Stockport-Altrincham turnpike (now the A560) and two minor roads: Dobbinetts Lane and Whitecarr lane. This was called Hale Road. It then used Roaring Gate Lane to Davenport Green before providing a further new road (Ashley Road) to the Altrincham-Wilmslow road (now the A538) in the village of Hale. The name Brooks's road gradually became accepted for Hale Road and Ashley Road. Samuel did not live to see this road completed but it was completed by his son William.

Beyond the immediate vicinity of Brooklands, most of this road was not used for development. It may have been made for Samuel’s own convenience in travelling around his estate. Since World War II, development has been restricted by planning laws and some of the road still passes through greenbelt agricultural land.

== Sources ==
- Brackenbury, Allan (1993) "The Road from Brooklands Station", in: Journal of the Railway and Canal History Society; Vol 31, Pt 4, No. 156, pp. 170–74 (Nov 1993)

=== Some sources quoted by Brackenbury ===
- Grindon, Leo (1877) Manchester Banks and Bankers. Manchester: Palmer & Howe
- Dixon, Frank (1973) The Manchester South Junction and Altrincham Railway. Lingfield: Oakwood Press ISBN 0-85361-116-5
