= John Brooks (English politician) =

English lawyer and politician

John Baguley Brooks (7 April 1856 – 8 March 1886) was an English lawyer and Conservative politician who sat in the House of Commons from 1885 to 1886.

Brooks was the only son of the Rev. John Brooks, rector of Walton-le-Dale, Lancashire and his wife, Anne Jones, daughter of John Jones of Shackerley Hall, Shropshire.

Brooks was educated at Harrow School and Merton College, Oxford, where he won the Newdigate Prize in 1877. He graduated with honours from the School of History and Political Economy. In 1881, he was called to the Bar at Inner Temple and was a J.P. for Cheshire and Berkshire.

In the 1885 general election, Brooks was elected MP for the newly created constituency of Altrincham.

However he fell ill at his home in Eaton Place on the evening of 3 March 1886, on his return from the House of Commons and died of "congestion of the lungs" five days later.

He was succeeded in the Altrincham seat by his uncle, William Cunliffe Brooks.

Parliament of the United Kingdom
| New constituency | Member of Parliament for Altrincham; 1885–1886 | Succeeded by Sir William Cunliffe Brooks, Bt |
