= Fenton Atkinson =

British judge

Atkinson in 1969.

Sir Fenton Atkinson (6 January 1906 – 28 March 1980) was a British High Court judge. He was the judge who oversaw the trial of the Moors murderers, Ian Brady and Myra Hindley, at Chester Assizes in 1966.

== Early and private life ==
Atkinson was the son of High Court judge and Conservative Party politician Sir Cyril Atkinson. He was educated at Winchester College and New College, Oxford. He married Margaret Mary Roy in 1929. They had a son and two daughters.

== Career ==
Atkinson was called to the bar at Lincoln's Inn in 1928. Like his father, he practised on the Northern Circuit.

He served in the Royal Norfolk Regiment in the Second World War, receiving an emergency commission, and achieving the substantive rank of Major and acting Brigadier by September 1943. He served as an Assistant Adjutant general in India. He also served with the British Military Government in occupied Germany after the War, and participated in the Nuremberg trials.

He was appointed as a Queen's Counsel in 1953, and became a judge in Salford Hundred Court of Record the same year. He became a deputy chairman of the Hertfordshire Quarter session in 1958. He was appointed as a High Court judge in 1960, serving in the Queen's Bench Division, and received the customary knighthood.

He oversaw the Moors Murders trial at Chester Assizes in the spring of 1966, at which Ian Brady was found guilty of three murders, and Myra Hindley of two murders and of being an accessory in the third murder. He sentenced both of them to life imprisonment.

He was a member of the Beeching Commission in 1966–67 that recommended reforms to the court system of Assizes and Quarter Sessions, leading to the Crown Courts system from 1971.

Atkinson was promoted to the Court of Appeal in 1968, serving as a Lord Justice of Appeal until he resigned on medical grounds in 1971. He sat on the Court of Appeal panels that heard the appeal of James Hanratty in 1962, the appeals of the Great Train Robbers in 1964, and the appeal in 1971 in Knuller, Knuller v DPP, a case of conspiracy to corrupt public morals in relation to gay contact advertisements published in IT magazine.

He died in March 1980, aged 74.

== Arms ==
Coat of arms of Fenton Atkinson
Motto Nil Sine Labore

== Notes ==
- "ATKINSON, Rt Hon. Sir Fenton", Who Was Who, A & C Black, 1920–2008; online edn, Oxford University Press, Dec 2007 accessed 18 Aug 2012
- "Sir Fenton Atkinson". The Times (London, England), Saturday, 29 March 1980; pg. 14; Issue 60588. (276 words)
- Atkinson, Sir Fenton, generals.dk
- Sir Fenton Atkinson, National Portrait Gallery
