= Unionist Club =

Former Gentleman's Club

The Unionist Club was a short-lived London gentlemen's club, now dissolved, which was established in 1886, and had wound up by 1892. For the last four years of its existence, it had a clubhouse at 66-68 Pall Mall.

The club was formed shortly after the mass defection of scores of Liberal MPs and Peers over the First Home Rule Bill, to create the new Liberal Unionist party. The new party went into an immediate alliance with the Conservatives, but remained a separate body until 1912. Because of this, many Liberal Unionist politicians found they were not wholly welcome in established Conservative clubs like the Carlton, but were equally shunned in traditionally Liberal clubs like the Reform.

Consequently, the club was set up for Liberal Unionists, and moved to its Pall Mall clubhouse in 1888. The Clubhouse had originally been built for the short-lived Junior Naval and Military Club in 1875, which accumulated so much debt over the building that it went bankrupt in 1879. The premises were then taken over by a Conservative club, the Beaconsfield between 1880 and 1887.

The Unionist Club always suffered from limited membership, as a great many Liberal Unionists stayed on in their old Liberal clubs, seeing themselves as 'true' Liberals - this is illustrated by an incident in 1912 when Winston Churchill tried to belittle Sir Edward Carson's integrity by saying "The right hon. Gentleman forces me to remind him that he was a member of the National Liberal Club", only to be told by Carson "I was elected as a Unionist."

Heavily in debt, the Unionist Club closed its doors in 1892. The building was eventually taken over by the New Oxford and Cambridge Club, which operated there from 1894 to 1920.

== See also ==
- List of London's gentlemen's clubs
