= East Cheshire (constituency) =

Parliamentary constituency in the United Kingdom, 1868–1885

- Former county constituency for the House of Commons
- County: Cheshire

1868–1885
- Seats: Two
- Created from: North Cheshire
- Replaced by: Macclesfield

East Cheshire was a parliamentary constituency which returned two Members of Parliament (MPs) to the House of Commons of the Parliament of the United Kingdom. Elections were held using the bloc vote system.

== History ==
Under the Reform Act 1867, the Parliamentary County of Cheshire was divided into three 2-member constituencies. This was achieved by the creation of Mid Cheshire which comprised the Hundred of Bucklow from North Cheshire and the Hundred of Northwich from South Cheshire. Under the Boundary Act 1868, North Cheshire and South Cheshire were renamed East Cheshire and West Cheshire respectively.

Under the Redistribution of Seats Act 1885, the three 2-member seats were abolished and re-divided into eight single-member constituencies: Altrincham, Crewe, Eddisbury, Hyde, Knutsford, Macclesfield, Northwich and Wirral.

== Boundaries ==
1868–1885: The Hundred of Macclesfield.

== Members of Parliament ==
Election	First member	First party	Second member	Second Party
1868	Edward Egerton	Conservative	William Legh	Conservative
1869 by-election	William Cunliffe Brooks	Conservative	William Legh	Conservative
1885	constituency abolished			

== Elections ==
=== Elections in the 1860s ===
General election 1868: East Cheshire
Party	Candidate	Votes	%	±%
Conservative	Edward Egerton	Unopposed		
Conservative	William Legh	Unopposed		
Registered electors		6,276		
Conservative win (new seat)				
Conservative win (new seat)				

Egerton's death caused a by-election.

By-election, 6 Oct 1869: East Cheshire
Party	Candidate	Votes	%	±%
Conservative	William Cunliffe Brooks	2,908	61.6	N/A
Liberal	Edward Watkin	1,815	38.4	New
Majority		1,093	23.2	N/A
Turnout		4,723	75.3	N/A
Registered electors		6,276		
Conservative hold				

=== Elections in the 1870s ===
General election 1874: East Cheshire
Party	Candidate	Votes	%	±%
Conservative	William Cunliffe Brooks	Unopposed		
Conservative	William Legh	Unopposed		
Registered electors		6,492		
Conservative hold				
Conservative hold				

=== Elections in the 1880s ===
10713

General election 1880: East Cheshire
Party	Candidate	Votes	%	±%
Conservative	William Cunliffe Brooks	3,424	32.0	N/A
Conservative	William Legh	3,310	30.9	N/A
Liberal	Gibbon Bayley-Worthington	2,032	19.0	New
Liberal	Thomas Albert Bazley	1,947	18.2	New
Majority		1,278	11.9	N/A
Turnout		5,357 (est)	78.2 (est)	N/A
Registered electors		6,849		
Conservative hold		Swing	N/A	
Conservative hold		Swing	N/A	

== See also ==
- List of former United Kingdom Parliament constituencies
- History of parliamentary constituencies and boundaries in Cheshire
