= 1886 Altrincham by-election =

UK Parliamentary by-election

The 1886 Altrincham by-election was held on 26 March 1886 after the incumbent Conservative MP, John Baguley Brooks died. The seat was retained and won by the Conservative candidate, Sir William Cunliffe Brooks.

Altrincham by-election, 1886
Party	Candidate	Votes	%	±%
Conservative	Sir William Cunliffe Brooks	5,056	54.3	
Liberal	I S Leadam	4,258	45.7	
Majority		798	8.6	
Turnout		9,314		
Conservative hold		Swing		
