= Bozeat =

Village in Northamptonshire, England

Coordinates: 52.2173°N 0.6621°W

Bozeat, Wellingborough
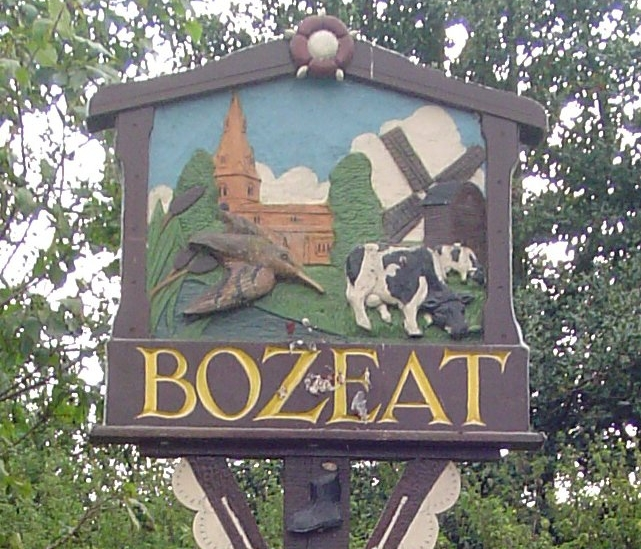
- Village sign

- Location within Northamptonshire
- Population: 2,051 (2011 census)
- OS grid reference: SP9158
  - London: 65 miles (105 km)
- Unitary authority: North Northamptonshire
- Ceremonial county: Northamptonshire
- Region: East Midlands
- Country: England
- Sovereign state: United Kingdom
- Post town: Wellingborough
- Postcode district: NN29
- Dialling code: 01933
- Police: Northamptonshire
- Fire: Northamptonshire
- Ambulance: East Midlands
- UK Parliament: Wellingborough

Bozeat locally /ˈboʊʒət/ is a village and civil parish in the postal district of Wellingborough, North Northamptonshire, England, about 6 miles (10 km) south of Wellingborough on the A509 road, near Wollaston. At the time of the 2011 census, Bozeat's population (including Easton Maudit) was 2,052.

== Origin of the name ==
Rev. Joseph Horace Marlow gives two possible origins of Bozeat's name:

- Bozeat probably existed in Saxon times – Saxon coins have been found – and an early spelling of Bozeat was Bosgate, suggesting Bozeat may have meant Bosa(s) gate. Bosa was a common Saxon name and a Saxon Earl Bosa held land near here. In a similar way Strixton is named after the Saxon thane Strix. In Old English geat/gaet, and in Middle English yatt and zett are all recognised as meaning gate, opening or entrance to woods or land. All the various spellings of Bozeat over the years show some link to both Bosa and gate.

One possible French influence is shown in the Domesday Book (1086) spelling Bosiete and it is possible that the Normans slightly altered the name to make it more French. There may even be a link with the French Bosquet (small wood) or Latin Boscus (wood). With all the vagaries of spelling and spoken English over the centuries it is unlikely that Bozeat is still pronounced in the same way it was originally.

- A second explanation of the name Bozeat meaning beautiful spring, from the French Beau-jet, assumes that the pronunciation of Bozeat was the same centuries ago as it is now. So although this theory is very appealing it does not have the same historical credibility as the first – Bosa's Gate.

The Oxford Dictionary of English Place-names says that Bozeat is derived from the "Gate or gap of a man called Bosa."

== History ==
A little north-west of Bozeat a 48 ft circular Roman building was excavated in 1964–65. Two Roman kilns and five other buildings were also found during work on a housing estate.

Before the Norman Conquest, the Saxon thane, Strix (of Strixton) held some of the land here under Earl Waltheof, a powerful Saxon Earl of Northumbria. At the Norman Conquest, William I gave most of the land locally to his niece Judith, who became the first Countess of Northampton. Judith married Earl Waltheof, so the Saxon Earl and the Norman Lady became joint owners.

The Norman parish church dedicated to St Mary, built about 1130, is older than both Easton Maudit and Wollaston churches, and survived the Great Fire of Bozeat in 1729. It was rebuilt in 1880–83.

In the 15th century there was a thriving weaving industry within the farming community, but by the beginning of the 20th century the population had risen to 1,200 and boasted a cottage lace-making industry, a shoe industry and a windmill, with many independent tradesmen, making a very self-reliant village. At this time Bozeat had at least 20 shops, a school, five pubs and four churches.

There are many wells in the village, one of the most important being the communal 'Town Well', which came from a jet of water coming out of the side of a bank in Dychurch Lane. A charity was registered to pay for its upkeep.

=== World War II ===
German intelligence officer Hans Reysen had parachuted in early October 1940, into Easton Maudit. He stayed in buildings on Grendon Road at Yardley Hastings, but was caught on October 4 1940, and taken to Percy Keggin, and briskly walked with the head of the Easton Maudit Home Guard, 41-year-old Walter Reginald Penn, to the police officer in Bozeat, John William Forth around 7.30pm. Reysen's clothes looked unusual for rural Northamptonshire. Mr Forth telephoned Wellingborough police, and Inspector Sharman drove to Bozeat at 8pm. Reysen was searched, and a gun and intelligence documents were found. When questioned in London, he narrowly escaped execution, and for the duration of the war, he lived at Camp 020R.

Largely all German parachuted agents were caught within days, as many had inaccurate documents, with occasional errors, and local people would soon notice the strange out-of-context clothing that many agents were supplied with. And, after 1941, any unusual individual aircraft flying over the English Channel, would be shot down by Mosquito nightfighter aircraft, which at around 400mph typical speed, could soon reach such suspicious aircraft.

=== Industry ===
Bozeat's shoe trade dates back to the middle of the 17th century but until the middle of the 18th century, it was considered a cottage industry. Men made and mended shoes in small buildings near their homes which were called 'shops', but although some remain today, they now serve a different purpose. The population grew rapidly when large shoe factories were built, providing much-needed employment for both men and women, and these remained Bozeat's main trade until 1982 when the last shoe factory closed.

The sports brand Gola was based in the village and was then known as the Bozeat Boot Company.

== Transport ==
In January 1989 a by-pass was built west of the village to take the increasing traffic to Milton Keynes. In spring 2001, with more traffic passing the village and a number of accidents, a new roundabout was constructed to replace the junction of the A509 Wollaston Road. It made access into and out of the village safer. The village is connected by the W8 Wellingborough–Bozeat bus route.

== Amenities ==
As of July 2017 the village had a primary school, a NISA supermarket, NHS doctors surgery and an Indian Take away. Most trades are represented within the village. There is the Red Lion pub, bus services to Wellingborough and Northampton as well as local taxis. There are many specialist home-based businesses inline with the digital age. The Bozeat playing fields are marked for two football pitches and host outdoor exercise equipment, a table tennis table, a tennis court, children's play park, skate park and a pavilion building which contains a recycling shop on a Saturday morning. There is also a Scout Group, which includes Beavers and Cubs, and a Women's Institute.

== Services ==
The 20th century brought the utilities to Bozeat. Mains electricity was installed in 1925, mains water in 1949, sewerage in 1950, and gas in 1990. Three private housing estates were built during the 1960s and 1970s. 1999 saw the demolition of the Gola factory and 30+ more families settled into village life.

The village sign was erected in the millennium year after some months of dedicated fundraising. It depicts St Mary's Church, Bozeat and a windmill, representing aspects of village life that have continued over the years.
