= Beaconsfield Club =

Former London gentlemen's club

Coordinates: 51.5054°N 0.1369°W

The Beaconsfield Club was a London gentlemen's club, now dissolved, which was established in 1880 and was disbanded circa 1887–8. For most of its existence, between 1880 and 1887, it occupied 66-68 Pall Mall, London.

The club was formally linked to the Conservative party, with members having to pledge allegiance to join. It was named in honour of Benjamin Disraeli, 1st Earl of Beaconsfield. It purchased its clubhouse from a Captain John Elliott, who had built it for the short-lived Junior Naval and Military Club, but went bankrupt as a direct result of constructing the building.

However, the Beaconsfield Club was not as successful as had been hoped, and was forced to leave the premises by 1887, closing within a year. The building in turn was then passed on to the equally short-lived Unionist Club, before being demolished in 1930.

Correspondence relating to the Beaconsfield Club is held by the University of Glasgow.

== See also ==
- List of London's gentlemen's clubs
