= Alfred Dobbs =

British politician

Alfred Dobbs MP

Member of Parliament for Smethwick
- In office 26 July 1945 – 27 July 1945
- Preceded by: Roy Wise
- Succeeded by: Patrick Gordon Walker

Personal details
- Born: Alfred James Dobbs; 18 June 1882 Bozeat, Northamptonshire, England
- Died: 27 July 1945 (aged 63) Doncaster, West Riding of Yorkshire, England
- Party: Labour

Alfred James Dobbs (18 June 1882 – 27 July 1945) was a British Labour Party politician and trade unionist. He died in a car accident the day after he had been elected as a member of parliament (MP) for Smethwick. His one day as an MP remains the shortest term in the era after the Second World War.

== Local politics and union career ==
Dobbs was born in Bozeat, Northamptonshire. He served as a Rushden Urban District Councillor between 1906 and 1910, although he moved to Leeds in 1909. There, he immediately took an interest in the Leeds branch of the National Union of Boot and Shoe Operatives, becoming president of the branch in 1917. In March 1919, he was elected to the executive committee of the Union.

In local politics, Dobbs was elected as a Leeds City Councillor from 1923 to 1929, then as Alderman in Leeds 1929–1936 and was chairman the Housing Committee. Dobbs was Leader of Labour Group on Leeds City Council between 1931 and 1936 as well as a magistrate.

After his time at the Leeds City Council, Dobbs worked as National Organiser for the Shoe Union 1936–1945. He was well known at senior levels of the Labour Party, a member of the National Executive Committee 1936–1945 and Chair of the Labour Party 1942–1943.

Dobbs stood for Parliament on several occasions, in Altrincham at the 1929 general election and in Leeds North East at the 1931 and 1935 general elections.

== Election and death ==
He was elected as MP for Smethwick in the Labour landslide of 1945, succeeding the Conservative incumbent, Roy Wise, who stood in the Epping constituency. However, having been elected on 26 July 1945, Dobbs was killed in a car accident the next day, 27 July 1945. Attempting to avoid a child, Dobbs' car was in collision with a military vehicle in Doncaster, and he was killed instantly. His passenger, Mrs. Elsie Marshall, was seriously injured and was taken to the Doncaster Royal Infirmary. She died later in hospital. Although there have been occasions when MPs were elected posthumously, Dobbs' term was the shortest actually served since World War II.

He was succeeded as MP for Smethwick by Labour's Patrick Gordon Walker, who held the seat for the next 19 years.

== See also ==
- List of United Kingdom MPs with the shortest service

Parliament of the United Kingdom
Preceded by Roy Wise	Member of Parliament for Smethwick; 26 July 1945 – 27 July 1945	Succeeded by Patrick Gordon Walker
Party political offices
Preceded by Walter Green	Chair of the Labour Party; 1942–1943	Succeeded by George Ridley
