= 1913 Altrincham by-election =

UK parliamentary by-election

The 1913 Altrincham by-election was a Parliamentary by-election held on 28 May 1913. The constituency returned one Member of Parliament (MP) to the House of Commons of the United Kingdom, elected by the first past the post voting system.

== Vacancy ==
The vacancy occurred following the resignation of John Kebty-Fletcher, the sitting Unionist Member of Parliament for Altrincham.

== Electoral history ==
Kebty-Fletcher had won the seat from the Liberal Party at the previous general election in December 1910 with a slim majority of 119 votes.

General election December 1910 Electorate 18,921
Party	Candidate	Votes	%	±%
Conservative	John Kebty-Fletcher	8,002	50.4	+3.1
Liberal	William Crossley	7,883	49.6	−3.1
Majority		119	0.8	N/A
Turnout		15,885	84.0	
Conservative hold		Swing		

== Candidates ==
On 2 May, the candidates for the by-election were selected. The Altrincham Unionist Association chose George Hamilton of Knutsford, while the Liberals nominated Lawrence Kay-Shuttleworth, eldest son of Lord Shuttleworth, Lord-Lieutenant of Lancashire.

== Campaign ==
The writ for the by-election was moved on 8 May, and the date for the election was set as 28 May. The delay was due to allow for the week-long Whitsun holiday enjoyed by Manchester workers.

The Liberals had formed a minority government with the support of Irish Nationalists. As the price of Nationalist support the government was attempting to introduce Home Rule for Ireland.

One of the main issues in the contest was Home Rule The Irish Nationalist leaders John Redmond and T P O'Connor urged Irish voters to support Kay-Shuttleworth. Hamilton spoke out in support of the Ulster Unionists who were threatening armed insurrection to resist devolution. This led to the Manchester Guardian launching an attack on the Conservative candidate as a "revolutionist". The apparent lack of support for Hamilton by Kebty-Fletcher, and his treatment by the local Unionist Party caused some controversy, although he eventually issued a letter discounting the story.

The government majority had been reduced from 126 to 106 following the loss of a string of by-elections since December 1910. The Liberals hoped to reverse this trend by regaining the Altrincham seat.

The Liberal Government was planning on passing a Plural Voting Bill that sought to prevent electors who appeared on the electoral register twice from voting twice. Liberal and Unionist HQs were in agreement over 25 seats that were won by Unionists in December 1910 because of plural voting, and this was one of those constituencies.

The Altrincham Trades Council called on workers to vote against Hamilton, who as a major employer refused to pay union rates.

== Result ==
The Unionists easily held the seat with a greatly increased majority. This was however partly explained by an increase in the electorate of 1,939 voters since 1910. Nevertheless, the result was deeply disappointing for the government. In contrast, Unionists were delighted, and Lord Londonderry, President of the Ulster Unionist Council sent a message of congratulation to Hamilton.

Altrincham by-election, 1913
Party	Candidate	Votes	%	±%
Unionist	George Hamilton	9,409	53.6	+3.2
Liberal	Lawrence Kay-Shuttleworth	8,147	46.4	−3.2
Majority		1,262	6.8	+6.0
Turnout		17,556		
Unionist hold		Swing	+3.2	

== Aftermath ==
Hamilton held the seat for ten years, losing to a Liberal candidate at the 1923 general election.
