= Cunliffe, Brooks =

English bank

Cunliffe, Brooks and Co. was a bank founded in Blackburn, Lancashire, England in 1792.

The bank founded by cotton entrepreneur William Brooks (1762–1846) and Roger Cunliffe. In 1819, Samuel Brooks, son of one of the founders, opened a branch of the bank in Manchester. In the 1820s, a second generation Cunliffe opened a London house, at 29 Lombard Street. In 1844, the Manchester bank was listed in an Act of Parliament as one of ten provincial banks working under an arrangement with the Bank of England. The London house merged with Alexanders, a discount house, in 1864, but a new London house, Brooks and Co., was opened at 81 Lombard Street by the sole partner in the Blackburn bank.

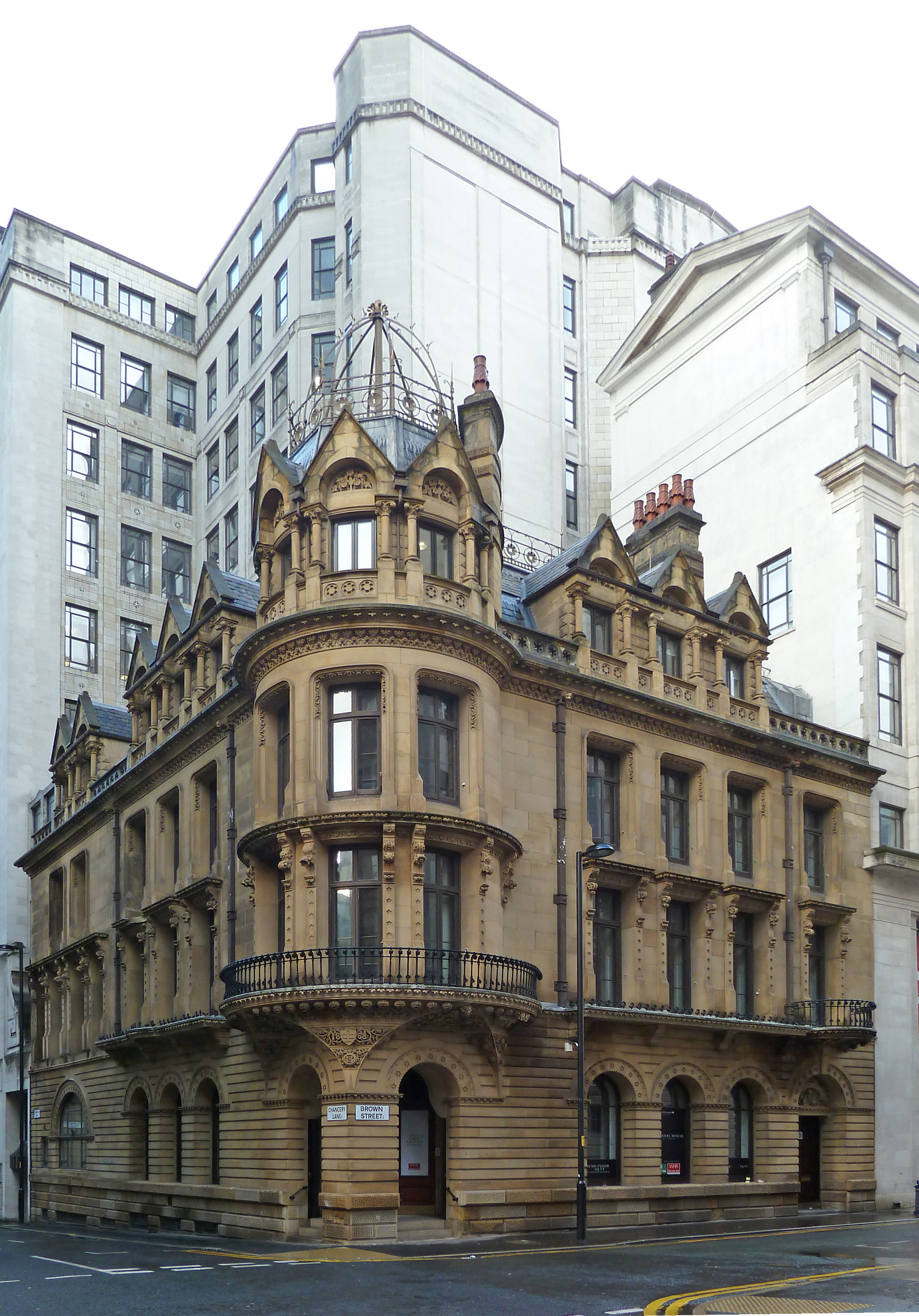
Brooks's Bank, Brown Street

A new bank building in Manchester was opened in 1868 at nos. 46-48 Brown Street; the architect was George Truefitt. At the corner where Brown Street meets Chancery Lane is a three-storey oriel with crisp carved ornament and on top an iron crown. In 1900, the bank merged with Lloyds Bank.
