= Manchester Hospital for Consumption and Diseases of the Throat and Chest =

The Manchester Hospital for Consumption and Diseases of the Throat and Chest was an English hospital founded in 1875. It initially occupied a house at 18 St John Street, Manchester, with space for 8 inpatients. It moved to Bowdon then in Cheshire in 1885, where it was known as St. Anne's Hospital. There were 15 beds. A clinic was still run in Hardman Street, Manchester. By 1900 there were 50 beds in Bowdon. The hospital dealt with more than 11,000 cases in 1902, mostly as outpatients in the city centre. Sir William Crossley was chairman of the hospital, and he paid £70,000 to build the Manchester Sanatorium at Delamere Forest with 90 beds designed for open-air treatment. Of these, 36 beds were for patients who paid two or three guineas a week. The other 54 were paid for by Manchester Corporation. The Hardman Street clinic joined the National Health Service as the Manchester Ear, Nose and Throat Hospital in 1948 and closed in 1951.

== See also ==
- University Hospital of South Manchester NHS Foundation Trust.
