= Sir William Crossley, 1st Baronet =

Northern Irish politician & businessman (1844-1911)

Sir William John Crossley 1st Baronet
- Sir William Crossley

Member of Parliament for Altrincham
- In office 1906–1910
- Preceded by: Coningsby Disraeli
- Succeeded by: John Robert Kebty-Fletcher

Personal details
- Born: 22 April 1844 Lisburn, County Antrim
- Died: 12 October 1911 (aged 67) Manchester, England
- Party: Liberal
- Spouse: Mabel Gordon Anderson (m. 1876)
- Relatives: Anthony Crossley (grandson)

Sir William John Crossley, 1st Baronet (22 April 1844 – 12 October 1911) was a British engineer and Liberal politician.

W J Crossley was born at Glenburn, near Lisburn, County Antrim. His ancestors had come to Ireland from Lancashire at the time of the Williamite War. He was educated at the Royal School Dungannon and in Bonn.

He was first employed at the machine works of W G Armstrong, Elswick, before joining his brother, Francis to found the Crossley Brothers engineering firm in Manchester in 1867. In 1876 the company began the production of gas engines, and the firm went on to be major employers. There are engines on display at Science and Industry Museum Manchester

- Diesel
- Oil
- Gas

In 1906 he was asked to stand as Liberal candidate for the parliamentary constituency of Altrincham, and defeated the sitting Conservative MP, Coningsby Disraeli. He was created a baronet in 1909. He lost his parliamentary seat at the December 1910 election by 119 votes.

He was elected to the membership of Manchester Literary and Philosophical Society on 12 November 1895. Crossley was involved in philanthropic works. He was Chairman of the Manchester Hospital for Consumption and Diseases of the Throat and Chest and built a sanitorium at Delamere Forest for patients from Lancashire towns at his own expense. In 1903 he was given the freedom of the City of Manchester for his philanthropic work and donations. He was president of Manchester YMCA, and one of the original promoters of the Manchester Ship Canal. He was a teetotaler and treasurer of the United Kingdom Alliance, a temperance organisation.

In 1876 he married Mabel Gordon Anderson. Sir William and Lady Crossley had five children:

- Kenneth Irwin Crossley (1877–1957), who succeeded as 2nd Baronet, and was High Sheriff of Cheshire in 1919.
- Eric Crossley (1878–1949)
- Brian Crossley (b. 1886)
- Lettice Crossley (b. 1879) and Cicely Crossley (b. 1880). Both Lettice and Cicely died as infants.

He died aged 67 in 1911, following complications from an operation.

Parliament of the United Kingdom
Preceded by Coningsby Disraeli	Member of Parliament for Altrincham; 1906 – December 1910	Succeeded by John Robert Kebty-Fletcher
Baronetage of the United Kingdom
New creation	Baronet (of Glenfield); 1909–1911	Succeeded by Kenneth Crossley
