= Altrincham (constituency) =

Parliamentary constituency in the United Kingdom, 1885–1945

- Former county constituency for the House of Commons

1885–1945
- Seats: one
- Created from: Mid Cheshire, East Cheshire
- Replaced by: Altrincham and Sale, Bucklow and Knutsford

Altrincham was a county constituency of the House of Commons of the Parliament of the United Kingdom from 1885 to 1945. It elected one Member of Parliament (MP) by the first past the post system of election.

== History and boundaries ==
Altrincham was created under the Redistribution of Seats Act 1885 from the much larger two-member constituencies of Mid Cheshire and East Cheshire, as one of eight new single-member divisions of the county of Cheshire.

Under the Representation of the People Act 1918, it was redefined to cover the urban districts of Altrincham, Ashton upon Mersey, Bowdon, Cheadle and Gatley, Hale, Handforth, Lymm and Sale, and part of the rural district of Bucklow, all in Cheshire. The boundaries were broadly similar, with Bramhall (then part of Hazel Grove and Bramhall UD) being transferred to Knutsford.

Subsequent reorganisations of local authority areas resulted in Ashton upon Mersey being absorbed into Sale, which later became a municipal borough; Altrincham being expanded to include the parish of Timperley, also becoming a municipal borough; and Handforth being absorbed into the urban district of Wilmslow.

The House of Commons (Redistribution of Seats) Act 1944 set up Boundary Commissions to carry out periodic reviews of the distribution of parliamentary constituencies. It also authorised an initial review to subdivide abnormally large constituencies (those exceeding an electorate of 100,000) in time for the 1945 election. This was implemented by the Redistribution of Seats Order 1945 under which Cheshire was allocated one additional seat, by splitting the Altrincham Division into two seats:

- Altrincham and Sale Parliamentary Borough, comprising the two respective municipal boroughs; and
- Bucklow County Division, comprising the urban districts of Bowdon, Cheadle and Gatley, Hale and Lymm and the part of the rural district of Bucklow. It also included the former parishes of Baguley, Northenden and Northen Etchells which had been absorbed into the county borough of Manchester.

The part comprising the former urban district of Handforth was transferred to Knutsford.

== Members of Parliament ==
- Constituency created (1885)

Election	Member	Party
1885	John Brooks	Conservative
1886 by-election	Sir William Cunliffe Brooks	Conservative
1892	Coningsby Disraeli	Conservative
1906	William Crossley	Liberal
1910, December	John Kebty-Fletcher	Conservative
1913 by-election	George Hamilton	Conservative
1922	Sir George Hamilton	Conservative
1923	Robert Alstead	Liberal
1924	Cyril Atkinson	Conservative
1933 by-election	Sir Edward Grigg	Conservative
1945	constituency abolished	

== Election results ==
=== Elections in the 1880s ===
General election 1885: Altrincham
Party	Candidate	Votes	%	±%
Conservative	John Brooks	4,798	54.3	
Liberal	Isaac Saunders Leadam	4,046	45.7	
Majority		752	8.6	
Turnout		8,844	84.3	
Registered electors		10,497		
Conservative win (new seat)				

Brooks' death caused a by-election.

By-election, 26 Mar 1886: Altrincham
Party	Candidate	Votes	%	±%
Conservative	William Cunliffe Brooks	4,508	53.5	−0.8
Liberal	Isaac Saunders Leadam	3,925	46.5	+0.8
Majority		583	7.0	−1.6
Turnout		8,433	80.3	−4.0
Registered electors		10,497		
Conservative hold		Swing	−0.8	

General election 1886: Altrincham
Party	Candidate	Votes	%	±%
Conservative	William Cunliffe Brooks	Unopposed		
Conservative hold				

=== Elections in the 1890s ===
General election 1892: Altrincham
Party	Candidate	Votes	%	±%
Conservative	Coningsby Disraeli	5,056	54.3	N/A
Liberal	Isaac Saunders Leadam	4,258	45.7	New
Majority		798	8.6	N/A
Turnout		9,314	84.3	N/A
Registered electors		11,048		
Conservative hold		Swing	N/A	

General election 1895: Altrincham
Party	Candidate	Votes	%	±%
Conservative	Coningsby Disraeli	5,264	57.5	+3.2
Liberal	Alexander Mere Latham	3,889	42.5	−3.2
Majority		1,375	15.0	+6.4
Turnout		9,153	79.3	−5.0
Registered electors		11,547		
Conservative hold		Swing	+3.2	

=== Elections in the 1900s ===
C.R. Disraeli

General election 1900: Altrincham
Party	Candidate	Votes	%	±%
Conservative	Coningsby Disraeli	5,685	57.6	+0.1
Liberal	E F Alford	4,177	42.4	−0.1
Majority		1,508	15.2	+0.2
Turnout		9,862	75.5	−3.8
Registered electors		13,061		
Conservative hold		Swing	+0.1	

William Crossley

General election 1906: Altrincham
Party	Candidate	Votes	%	±%
Liberal	William Crossley	8,321	59.5	+17.1
Conservative	Coningsby Disraeli	5,672	40.5	−17.1
Majority		2,649	19.0	N/A
Turnout		14,025	84.8	+9.3
Registered electors		16,492		
Liberal gain from Conservative		Swing	+17.1	

=== Elections in the 1910s ===
General election January 1910: Altrincham
Party	Candidate	Votes	%	±%
Liberal	William Crossley	8,709	52.7	−6.8
Conservative	Walter Keppel	7,808	47.3	+6.8
Majority		901	5.4	−13.6
Turnout		16,517		
Liberal hold		Swing	−6.9	

General election December 1910: Altrincham
Party	Candidate	Votes	%	±%
Conservative	John Kebty-Fletcher	8,002	50.4	+3.1
Liberal	William Crossley	7,883	49.6	−3.1
Majority		119	0.8	N/A
Turnout		15,885	84.0	
Conservative gain from Liberal		Swing		

1913 Altrincham by-election
Party	Candidate	Votes	%	±%
Unionist	George Hamilton	9,409	53.6	+3.2
Liberal	Lawrence Ughtred Kay-Shuttleworth	8,147	46.4	−3.2
Majority		1,262	6.8	+6.0
Turnout		17,556		
Unionist hold		Swing	+3.2	

General Election 1914–15:

Another General Election was required to take place before the end of 1915. The political parties had been making preparations for an election to take place and by July 1914, the following candidates had been selected;

- Unionist: Collingwood George Clements Hamilton
- Liberal: Edward Powell

General election, 1918: Altrincham
Party		Candidate	Votes	%	±%
C	Unionist	George Hamilton	20,421	72.7	+22.3
	Labour	George Middleton	7,685	27.3	New
Majority			12,736	45.4	+44.6
Turnout			28,106	68.5	−15.5
	Unionist hold		Swing		
C indicates candidate endorsed by the coalition government.

=== Elections in the 1920s ===
General election 1922: Altrincham
Party	Candidate	Votes	%	±%
Unionist	George Hamilton	19,361	53.8	−18.9
Liberal	Robert Alstead	11,692	32.5	New
Labour	George Benson	4,930	13.7	−13.6
Majority		7,669	21.3	−24.1
Turnout		35,983	79.8	+11.3
Unionist hold		Swing	N/A	

General election 1923: Altrincham
Party	Candidate	Votes	%	±%
Liberal	Robert Alstead	19,046	54.2	+21.7
Unionist	George Hamilton	16,081	45.8	−8.0
Majority		2,965	8.4	N/A
Turnout		35,127	76.6	−3.2
Liberal gain from Unionist		Swing	+14.9	

General election 1924: Altrincham
Party	Candidate	Votes	%	±%
Unionist	Cyril Atkinson	24,439	61.0	+15.2
Liberal	Robert Alstead	15,654	39.0	−15.2
Majority		8,785	22.0	N/A
Turnout		40,093	84.8	+8.2
Unionist gain from Liberal		Swing	+15.2	

General election 1929: Altrincham
Party	Candidate	Votes	%	±%
Unionist	Cyril Atkinson	28,512	50.7	−10.3
Liberal	Robert Alstead	18,475	32.9	−6.1
Labour	Alfred Dobbs	9,242	16.4	New
Majority		10,037	17.8	−4.2
Turnout		56,229	80.8	−4.0
Unionist hold		Swing	−2.1	

=== Elections in the 1930s ===
General election, 1931: Altrincham
Party	Candidate	Votes	%	±%
Conservative	Cyril Atkinson	Unopposed	N/A	N/A
Conservative hold				

Philip Oliver

Altrincham by-election, 14 June 1933
Party	Candidate	Votes	%	±%
Conservative	Edward Grigg	25,392	51.2	+0.5
Liberal	Philip Oliver	15,892	32.0	−0.9
Labour	James Hudson	8,333	16.8	+0.4
Majority		9,500	19.2	+1.4
Turnout		49,617	63.4	−17.4
Conservative hold		Swing	+0.7	

- Percentage change and swing are calculated from 1929.

Sir Edward Grigg

General election, 1935: Altrincham
Party	Candidate	Votes	%	±%
Conservative	Edward Grigg	50,719	70.2	+19.0
Labour	Abraham Moss	21,493	29.8	+13.0
Majority		29,226	40.4	+21.2
Turnout		72,212	72.0	+8.6
Conservative hold		Swing	+3.0	

=== Elections in the 1940s ===
A General Election was due to take place before the end of 1940, but was postponed due to the Second World War. By 1939, the following candidates had been selected to contest this constituency;

- Conservative: Edward Grigg
- Labour: C F C Donnelly

== See also ==
- History of parliamentary constituencies and boundaries in Cheshire
- 1913 Altrincham by-election
- 1933 Altrincham by-election
