= John Kebty-Fletcher =

British politician (1869–1918)

John Robert Kebty-Fletcher (1869 – 12 July 1918) was a British Conservative politician.

Born in Liverpool, Kebty-Fletcher was educated at Liverpool College and on the continent of Europe, and was a linguist, speaking five languages. During the Second Anglo-Boer War he worked as a correspondent for the Liverpool Post. By 1910 he was the chief partner in the firm of Messrs George Fletcher, provision merchants, and a former president of the Liverpool Produce Exchange and a trustee of the Mersey Quay and Railway Carters' Union. In 1912 his address was given as "The Paddock", Hooton, Cheshire.

== Political career ==
Active in Unionist politics, by 1900 Kebty-Fletcher was a member of Liverpool City Council. He stood at the 1906 General Election as Conservative candidate for Rossendale but lost to the Liberal, Lewis Harcourt. He was elected Member of Parliament for Altrincham at the December 1910 general election, gaining the seat from the Liberals. As the Liberals were able to form a minority government with support from the Irish Parliamentary Party, Kebty-Fletcher found himself on the opposition benches. In May 1913 Kebty-Fletcher announced his immediate resignation from parliament by appointment as Crown Steward and Bailiff of the Manor of Northstead, causing a by-election.

== Controversy ==
In his short parliamentary career he was involved in two controversies. Firstly, in 1911, he made an attack on the Chancellor of the Exchequer, David Lloyd George accusing him of appointing a partner in his law firm to a government post. In 1913 he attacked the government over the Marconi scandal.

Parliament of the United Kingdom
Preceded by Sir William John Crossley	Member of Parliament for Altrincham; December 1910 – 1913	Succeeded by Sir George Hamilton, 1st Baronet
